= Mesopotamia (EP) =

EP by the B-52's
- Released: January 27, 1982
- Recorded: September 1981
- Studio: Blank Tape (New York City)
- Genres: New wave; art pop
- Length: 26:16 (US release); 32:56 (UK release)
- Labels: Warner Bros.; Island
- Producer: David Byrne

The B-52's chronology
Party Mix! (1981)	Mesopotamia (1982)	Whammy! (1983)

Singles from Mesopotamia
- 1. "Deep Sleep" / "Nip It in the Bud" Released: 1982; 2. "Mesopotamia" / "Throw That Beat in the Garbage Can" Released: 1982; 3. "Cake" / "Loveland" Released: 1982 (Spain and France)

Mesopotamia is an EP by the American new wave band the B-52's, released on January 27, 1982. It was produced by David Byrne of Talking Heads and was originally planned to be the band's third studio album. Due to conflicts with Byrne and record label pressure, recording sessions were aborted prematurely and only six of ten songs to be completed were released. The record was distributed as a 12-inch EP by Warner Bros. in the U.S. and by Island Records on vinyl and cassette in the UK and other non-U.S. markets.

Mesopotamia is considered a departure in style for the B-52's, with Byrne and the band adding additional instruments, vocal overdubs, horns, synthesizers and layered percussion. A larger emphasis was placed on production after the raw sound of their 1979 eponymous debut studio album and the slightly more produced sound of their second studio album, Wild Planet (1980).

In 2026, a deluxe edition box set of the EP titled Ancient Culture: Mesopotamia Revisited was released, containing session outtakes, alternate mixes and a live concert.

== Background ==
The B-52's' first two albums were largely made up of songs they had been performing live for a number of years, but Mesopotamia required new compositions. Drummer Keith Strickland later stated that living together in a house in upstate New York did not aid the writing process at this time: "The honeymoon was over. The fascination with being in a band, being successful – we'd already done it by that time. And at a level far beyond what we expected. We'd bought a house in Mahopac and were all living there together – and that created a strain on us, all living in one house together."

Additionally, guitarist Ricky Wilson stated in 1980 that the band felt constrained by outside expectations at this point in their career. Wilson observed that the band's manager, Gary Kurfirst, "was talking about our next album, and I mentioned that it might not be a dance record, and he was so shocked by that idea. It's shocking to me that people really do expect that of us now." Strickland later recalled that it was Kurfirst who was adamant that the band should change their sound, and that the decision was not arrived at "organically" by the band.

Kurfirst suggested that David Byrne of Talking Heads would be a good choice for the album's producer, due to his previous musical experience and history of touring with the B-52's. Despite time constraints with recording the soundtrack to The Catherine Wheel (1981), Byrne nevertheless agreed to produce Mesopotamia, producing the former during the day and the latter at night, with little sleep in between.

== Production ==
Mesopotamia was a departure in style for the B-52's. For the EP, Byrne incorporated several elements from his work with Talking Heads, including horn sections, synthesizers and worldbeat influences. Mesopotamia was also unique for the band because many of the tracks did not feature the vocal interplay for which they were known.

Originally, Mesopotamia was conceived as a full album. Singer/instrumentalist Kate Pierson later stated that, while the band desired to write more songs for the project, manager Kurfirst demanded the band quickly put out more material and then suggested releasing a shorter EP as a compromise. Pierson stated that "'Cake' wasn't finished. 'Deep Sleep,' I just kind of stuck that lyric on in the studio in one take. It was just not finished. We sometimes think, 'Wow, if only we could go back and finish Mesopotamia'." When the sessions initially broke down, Kurfirst arranged the release of a remix EP of old material, Party Mix!, while the band continued to work on the new sessions.

Pierson further stated that Island Records' owner Chris Blackwell did not want "Mesopotamia" included on the EP, despite the fact that it was the titular track and a completed piece: "I still think it's one of our best songs. And despite what Chris said, we never hesitated about putting it on there. We never thought, 'We're not putting this out.' We were always, like, 'Oh, yeah, we're putting 'Mesopotamia' on Mesopotamia'."

Several tracks from the sessions were abandoned, and three were re-recorded for the following album, Whammy! (1983). "Queen of Las Vegas", recorded for the intended full-length Mesopotamia album, was later released on the 2002 compilation album Nude on the Moon: The B-52's Anthology and features vocal performances from Pierson and Wilson, with Yogi Horton on drums. The song was modified and re-recorded in 1983 for the Whammy! album. The outtakes "Big Bird" and "Butterbean" were also re-recorded for Whammy!, while another, "Adios Desconocida", was not released at the time.

== Release ==
Mesopotamia was released on January 27, 1982. On the international release three songs—"Loveland, "Cake" and "Throw That Beat in the Garbage Can"—mistakenly appeared on the EP as rough extended remixes derived from demo tapes. When the band learned of this, the error was quickly rectified and the original mixes were reinstated.

The EP was remixed by Tom Durack at Skyline Studios in July and August 1990 and was packaged with Party Mix! as a single CD release in 1991.

In July 2026, a deluxe edition box set of the EP, titled Ancient Culture: Mesopotamia Revisited, was announced. For this release, Mesopotamia was recreated as a full album on both an LP and CD, with the inclusion of the previously unreleased session outtakes "Big Bird" and "Adios Desconocida" and the original version of "Queen of Las Vegas" (first released on Nude on the Moon: The B-52's Anthology). A second CD features the original international alternate mixes and 1991 remix of the EP, and a third disc presents an unreleased live concert recorded April 19, 1982, at the Roseland Ballroom.

== Reception ==
Professional ratings
Review scores
Source	Rating
AllMusic	3/5 stars
Christgau's Record Guide	A−
Select	2/5
Sounds	4.5/5 stars

The EP charted in the Billboard 200 in the U.S. and the Top 20 in the UK Albums Chart. The title track garnered the band a following in the Detroit area, after an African-American radio station began playing the song. Vocalist Fred Schneider later credited Detroit DJ the Electrifying Mojo for making the song a crossover hit, but recalled that the B-52's were being actively discouraged from appealing to an African-American audience by Kurfirst, despite the band's love of soul music. Pierson later recalled getting into a verbal altercation with Kurfirst after he dissuaded them from accepting an invitation to appear on New York African-American radio station WBLS to promote the album, on the grounds that it would be "confusing" for their audience.

Robert Christgau of The Village Voice praised the EP, calling it "a 'party' record that never invokes that pooped word," and deeming Byrne "the secret ingredient". Betty Page opined in Sounds that Byrne "sensibly avoided any maverick moves to dominate the essence of B-52-ism. Instead he's kept to strictly studio-style experiments". Conversely, Trouser Press felt the EP was where the band got "serious, with dire results", and while some tracks traded "élan for slickness", others appeared to be "selfconscious parodies of the old, carefree B-52's."

In a retrospective review for AllMusic, William Ruhlmann felt the EP was a "lackluster set", calling it "the sound of a band that once sounded like it was on a steady path, now losing its footing."

== Tour ==
In 1982, the B-52's returned to touring for their "Meso-America" tour. Live versions of the songs were performed by: Cindy Wilson on guitar, bongos and vocals; Fred Schneider on vocals; Kate Pierson on keyboards, bass guitar and vocals; Ricky Wilson on guitars; and Keith Strickland on drums. Saxophones on tour were played by Ralph Carney and trumpet and duck calls were performed by David Buck. Opening for over thirty dates on the tour were the Bongos, who were supporting their debut album.

== Track listing ==
Track times sourced via original Warner Bros. US vinyl release and 2026 reissue.

Side one
No.	Title	Writer(s)	Length
1.	"Loveland"	Keith Strickland, Ricky Wilson, Fred Schneider, Cindy Wilson	5:00
2.	"Deep Sleep"	Strickland, Kate Pierson, Robert Waldrop	3:29
3.	"Mesopotamia"	Strickland, R. Wilson, Pierson, Schneider	3:49

Side two
No.	Title	Writer(s)	Length
1.	"Cake"	Pierson, C. Wilson, Strickland, R. Wilson	5:48
2.	"Throw That Beat in the Garbage Can"	Strickland, R. Wilson, Schneider	4:30
3.	"Nip It in the Bud"	R. Wilson, Strickland, C. Wilson	3:32

=== Ancient Culture: Mesopotamia Revisited ===
Disc 1 - Full-Length Version
No.	Title	Writer(s)	Length
1.	"Mesopotamia"	Strickland, R. Wilson, Pierson, Schneider	3:58
2.	"Deep Sleep"	Strickland, Pierson, Robert Waldrop	3:31
3.	"Adios Desconocida"	Strickland, R. Wilson, Pierson, Schneider, C. Wilson	4:18
4.	"Queen of Las Vegas"	Strickland, R. Wilson, Pierson, Schneider, C. Wilson	5:39
5.	"Nip It in the Bud"	R. Wilson, Strickland, C. Wilson	3:33
6.	"Loveland"	Strickland, R. Wilson, Schneider, C. Wilson	5:02
7.	"Cake"	Pierson, C. Wilson, Strickland, R. Wilson	5:50
8.	"Throw That Beat in the Garbage Can"	Strickland, R. Wilson, Schneider	4:31
9.	"Big Bird"	Strickland, R. Wilson, Pierson, Schneider, C. Wilson	4:21

Disc 2 - Mixes
No.	Title	Writer(s)	Length
1.	"Loveland" (International Mix)	Strickland, R. Wilson, Schneider, C. Wilson	8:35
2.	"Cake" (International Mix)	Pierson, C. Wilson, Strickland, R. Wilson	7:44
3.	"Throw That Beat in the Garbage Can" (International Mix)	Strickland, R. Wilson, Schneider	5:48
4.	"Loveland" (Tom Durack Remix)	Strickland, R. Wilson, Schneider, C. Wilson	5:06
5.	"Deep Sleep" (Tom Durack Remix)	Strickland, Pierson, Waldrop	3:30
6.	"Mesopotamia" (Tom Durack Remix)	Strickland, R. Wilson, Pierson, Schneider	3:51
7.	"Cake" (Tom Durack Remix)	Pierson, C. Wilson, Strickland, R. Wilson	5:36
8.	"Throw That Beat in the Garbage Can" (Tom Durack Remix)	Strickland, R. Wilson, Schneider	4:10
9.	"Nip It in the Bud" (Tom Durack Remix)	R. Wilson, Strickland, C. Wilson	3:32

Disc 3 - Meso-America: Live at the Roseland Ballroom, New York, NY, April 19, 1982
No.	Title	Length
1.	"Party Out of Bounds"	5:09
2.	"Give Me Back My Man"	5:59
3.	"Big Bird"	4:17
4.	"Cake"	5:43
5.	"Lava"	4:07
6.	"Loveland"	4:27
7.	"Mesopotamia"	3:48
8.	"Planet Claire"	4:43
9.	"606-0842"	2:59
10.	"Throw That Beat in the Garbage Can"	4:10
11.	"Dance This Mess Around"	4:43
12.	"52 Girls"	2:42
13.	"Nip It in the Bud"	3:18
14.	"Rock Lobster"	5:18
15.	"Private Idaho"	3:44

== Personnel ==
The B-52's

- Ricky Wilson – guitar, keyboard, bass, organ
- Cindy Wilson – vocals
- Keith Strickland – keyboard, bass, drums, organ, piano, marimba, guitar
- Fred Schneider – vocals
- Kate Pierson – vocals, keyboard, bass, organ, bird calls

Additional musicians

- David Byrne – fretless bass, synthesizer, guitar, percussion
- Steve Scales – percussion
- Yogi Horton – drums
- Charles Rocket – accordion
- Ralph Carney – saxophone
- David Buck – trumpet
- Roberto Arron – saxophone

Technical

- David Byrne – producer
- Butch Jones – engineer
- Greg Calbi – mastering
- Simon Levy – art direction, design
- Desiree Rohr – illustration

== Chart performance ==
Chart (1982)	Peak position
U.S. Billboard 200	35
UK Albums Chart	18
