= The Warner and Reprise Years =

Box set by the B-52s
- Released: June 20, 2025
- Genre: New wave
- Label: Rhino
- Producer: Various

The B-52s chronology
Live! 8-24-1979 (2015)	The Warner and Reprise Years (2025)

The Warner and Reprise Years is a 2025 box set by American new wave band the B-52s, released on June 20, 2025 by Rhino Entertainment.

== Contents and packaging ==
The box set contains the band's studio albums released between 1979 and 1992 along with Party Mix! and Mesopotamia EP in their original forms without any bonus tracks. Each release is present on individual LP and CD except Good Stuff which is a double LP.

The only studio album absent from the set is 2008's Funplex, as Funplex was not released on either Warner Records or Reprise Records, and was instead released on Astralwerks Records.

== Release and critical reception ==
Professional ratings
Review scores
Source	Rating
PopMatters	9/10
Spectrum Culture	70%
Uncut	4.5/5 stars
Under the Radar	8/10 stars

The album was released in celebration of Pride Month.

Writing for Under the Radar, critic Frank Valish wrote the band "been a staple of quirky, exuberant, hyper-melodic, forward thinking indie rock for nearly 50 years", noting the band's catalog is an "exciting proposition." He concludes that "their best albums only bracketed that decade, with much wayward soul-searching in between. Still, kudos to Rhino for allowing such a comprehensive look back at a band that was, and still can be, so exciting".

In an Uncut magazine review, Tom Pinnock concluded that as the box set rises on the charts, the band continues to be "one of those rare groups who can genuinely claim to have launched the counterculture gloriously into the mainstream". In a review for Spectrum Culture, Will Pinfold called it "naturally, die-hard [for] B-52’s fans, but it’s kind of a (very attractive) washout from that point of view", noting it "simply brings together standard, non-expanded editions of readily available albums and EPs with no bonus material." He concludes that it shows "just what a delicate balance, and a symbiosis, their music is at its best".

In his review for Flood Magazine, A.D. Amorosi concludes it "only makes me want to live through their original release dates all over again, if for no other reason than to imagine the first-time awe of seeing and hearing The B-52’s." In a contemporary review for PopMatters, Evan Sawdey concludes that it "does more than highlight a group essential to the queer canon: it preserves some of the finest, silliest, and most enduring pop music ever made".

== Track listing ==
- The B-52's (1979) - LP 1 / CD 1
- Wild Planet (1980) - LP 2 / CD 2
- Party Mix! (1981) - LP 3 / CD 3
- Mesopotamia (1982) - LP 4 / CD 4
- Whammy! (1983) - LP 5 / CD 5
- Bouncing Off the Satellites (1986) - LP 6 / CD 6
- Cosmic Thing (1989) - LP 7 / CD 7
- Good Stuff (1992) - LP 8 & 9 / CD 8
