= Live! 8-24-1979 =

Live album by the B-52's
- Released: April 21, 2015
- Recorded: August 24, 1979
- Venues: Berklee Performance Center (Boston, Massachusetts)
- Genres: New wave; pop rock
- Label: Rhino

The B-52's chronology
With the Wild Crowd! Live in Athens, GA (2011)	Live! 8-24-1979 (2015)	The Warner and Reprise Years (2025)

Live! 8-24-1979 is the second official live album by American new wave band the B-52s. The concert was recorded on August 24, 1979 at the Berklee Performance Center in Boston, Massachusetts, before the release of their second album. The gig was part of their B-52's Tour.

Record label Rhino released the album in 2015 as a high-resolution download, as well as MP3 and mastered for iTunes.

== Track listing ==
1. "52 Girls (With Intro)" – 3:57
2. "6060-842" – 2:38
3. "Lava" – 5:03
4. "Private Idaho" – 3:52
5. "Devil in My Car" – 5:34
6. "Dance This Mess Around" – 4:49
7. "Runnin' Around" – 3:20
8. "Rock Lobster (With Encore Outro)" – 5:46
9. "Strobe Light" – 4:35

== Personnel ==
The B-52's

- Fred Schneider – vocals, percussion
- Kate Pierson – vocals, keyboards
- Cindy Wilson – vocals, percussion
- Keith Strickland – drums
- Ricky Wilson – guitar
