= Legal Tender (song) =

Single by the B-52's

from the album Whammy!
- B-side: "Moon 83"
- Released: 1983
- Recorded: 1982
- Studio: Compass Point (Nassau, Bahamas)
- Genre: New wave; synth-pop
- Length: 3:40
- Label: Island; Warner Bros.
- Composers: Kate Pierson; Fred Schneider; Keith Strickland; Cindy Wilson; Ricky Wilson
- Lyricist: Robert Waldrop
- Producer: Steven Stanley

The B-52's singles chronology
"Give Me Back My Man" (1980)	"Legal Tender" (1983)	"Whammy Kiss" (1983)

Music video
- "Legal Tender" on YouTube

"Legal Tender" is the first single released by American new wave band the B-52's from their third studio album Whammy! (1983).

== Description ==
The lyrics of "Legal Tender" tell a story about printing counterfeit American currency, in which the protagonist outfits a basement with "jelly jars" and "heavy equipment", and learns to print money due to inflation and rising prices. A companion music video was produced featuring Cindy Wilson and Kate Pierson, in wigs of many shapes and colors.

"Legal Tender" is an upbeat, synthesizer-based track with a drum machine and hand-clap rhythm. The lead vocals are shared by Pierson and Wilson. The song appears as the opening track on the band's third studio album, Whammy! (1983), signifying that the band had altered their sound quite significantly for the record.

"Legal Tender" was performed live during the Whammy! tour, with Keith Strickland on synthesizer, and horn parts added. The band has also performed the song on various occasions throughout the years.

== Chart performance ==
The single was the band's third Billboard Hot 100 chart entry, peaking at No. 81. The song also reached No. 9 on the U.S. Hot Dance Club Play chart, along with album tracks "Whammy Kiss" and "Song for a Future Generation."

The song was a 1984 airplay and club hit in Brazil, and was included in the band's performance at the 1985 Rock in Rio festival. When the band toured Brazil in 2009, omitting the song from the live set, fans chanted for them to play it. Because of the song's popularity in Brazil, it appeared on the Brazilian version of their greatest hits album Time Capsule: Songs for a Future Generation (1998), on which it replaced "52 Girls". It is also featured on the band's two-CD compilation Nude on the Moon (2002).

== Chart positions ==
Chart (1983)	Peak position
U.S. Billboard Hot 100	81
U.S. Cashbox Top 100	81
U.S. Billboard Hot Dance Club Play	9
