= Party Mix! =

Remix album by the B-52's
- Released: July 1981
- Recorded: 1979–1980
- Studios: Compass Point (Nassau, Bahamas)
- Genres: New wave; post-punk
- Length: 28:29
- Labels: Island; Warner Bros.
- Producers: Rhett Davies; the B-52's; Chris Blackwell

The B-52's chronology
Wild Planet (1980)	Party Mix! (1981)	Mesopotamia (1982)

Singles from Party Mix!
- 1. "Give Me Back My Man (Party Mix)" Released: 1981

Party Mix! is a remix album by American new wave band the B-52's, released in 1981 by Warner Bros. (US) and Island Records (Europe, Japan). It features three songs from their first studio album, The B-52's (1979), and three songs from their second LP, Wild Planet (1980). It has received generally good reviews. Commercially, the album peaked at number 55 in the US and number 36 in the UK.

== Background ==
The album was released between the band's second album, Wild Planet (1980), and their Mesopotamia EP (1982). It was devised as a stop-gap release by the band's manager, Gary Kurfirst, while the band was working on the Mesopotamia sessions.

On the original vinyl, the six-song collection featured songs from their first two albums remixed and sequenced to form two long tracks, one on each side. On the CD version, however, the six songs were their own individual tracks.

In 1991, Party Mix! and a 1990 remix version of Mesopotamia were combined and released as one CD in the US. In Europe, both albums were made available on separate CDs, with Mesopotamia retaining the original U.S. mix.

== Reception ==
=== Commercial ===
Party Mix! spent 11 weeks on the Billboard 200, peaking at No. 55.

=== Critical ===
Professional ratings
Review scores
Source	Rating
AllMusic	3/5 stars
Christgau's Record Guide	A−
The Encyclopedia of Popular Music	3/5 stars
The New Rolling Stone Album Guide	4/5 stars
Select	3/5

Robert Christgau of The Village Voice observed that the album's "implicit equation of party and disco offends old new-wavers, but at EP list for half an hour's music the extravagance is recommended." Trouser Press opined that the album was "functional for discos but antithetical to the B-52's' minimalist precepts."

In a retrospective review for AllMusic, William Ruhlmann stated, "Since the group's bouncy songs are already dance-ready, this makes for alternatives rather than real improvements, even from a dancefloor perspective." In 2022, Treble magazine named Party Mix! one of the ten essential remix albums, and wrote: "Party Mix! is such a part of the canon that DJ Shadow and Soulwax would reference it in a mashup 21 years later".

== Track listing ==
Side one

1. "Party Out of Bounds" (Fred Schneider, Keith Strickland, Ricky Wilson, Cindy Wilson, Kate Pierson) – 5:12
2. "Private Idaho" (Schneider, Strickland, R. Wilson, C. Wilson, Pierson) – 4:04
3. "Give Me Back My Man" (Schneider, Strickland, R. Wilson, C. Wilson) – 7:02

Side two

1. "Lava" (The B-52's) – 6:08
2. "Dance This Mess Around" (The B-52's) – 2:59
3. "52 Girls" (Jeremy Ayers, R. Wilson) – 2:58
- Side one: original versions from Wild Planet (1980)
- Side two: original versions from The B-52's (1979)

== Personnel ==
Credits adapted from Party Mix / Mesopotamia CD liner notes.

- Rhett Davies – producer (1–3)
- The B-52's – producers (1–3)
- Daniel Coulombe – remixing
- Steven Stanley – remixing
- Paul Wexler – remixing
- Chris Blackwell – producer (4–6)
- Robert Ash – associate producer (4–6)
- Tony Wright – cover
- Lynn Goldsmith – photograph

== Charts ==
Chart (1981)	Peak position
Australian Albums (Kent Music Report)	80
Swedish Albums (Sverigetopplistan)	23
UK Albums (Official Charts)	36
US Billboard 200	55
