= Funplex (disambiguation) =

Funplex may refer to:

- Funplex, an album by the B-52's
  - "Funplex" (song), the title track of this album
- Fun-Plex, an amusement park in Omaha, Nebraska
- The Funplex, an amusement park/center with two locations in Mount Laurel and East Hanover, New Jersey, United States
