= Realm (disambiguation) =

A realm is the dominion of a king or queen; a kingdom. Realm may also more broadly refer to everything which falls within a certain set of parameters.

Realm or Realms may also refer to:

== Maths and science ==
- Biogeographic realm, the largest scale bio-geographic division of the Earth's surface
- A hyperplane in geometry
- Domain (biology), the highest taxonomic rank of life, also called realm
- Realm (virology), the highest taxonomic rank of viruses

== Religion ==
- Realm, an English translation for two terms in Buddhist cosmology:
  - Trailokya, or three realms
  - Six realms (gati)
- Plane (esotericism)

== Information technology ==
- Realm (database), an object database and platform created primarily for mobile devices maintained by Realm Inc.
- A URL pattern in OpenID protocol, for which the OpenID authentication is valid
- An ID for an instance of a server software- HTTP transmits Realm when answering to a Basic access authentication request to distinguish different areas on server
- A scope of operation in networking or in security — as in Active Directory realms
- The Realm, an Australian hacker collective suspected of involvement in the 1989 WANK computer worm

== Arts and media ==
- Realms (album), by Cindy Wilson, 2023
- Realm (magazine), a British coffee-table magazine
- Realm Media, formerly Serial Box, an American audio entertainment company
- "Realms", a song by Hawkwind from Space Bandits
- Realms (EP), a 2020 EP by Wande Coal
- The Realm (comics), a publication of Image Comics
- The Realm (film), a 2018 Spanish thriller film

=== Games ===
- Realm (World of Warcraft), a server cluster for playing World of Warcraft
- Realm (video game), a 1996 platform shooter
- Realmz, a 1994 fantasy adventure
- Realms (video game), a 1991 real-time strategy game by Graftgold
- The Realm Online, one of the first massively multiplayer online role-playing games
- Minecraft Realms, an official subscription-based Minecraft server hosting service

== Other uses ==
- Commonwealth realm, one of the states of the Commonwealth of Nations that recognize King Charles III as monarch
- German Reich, or German Realm, the nation state of the German people
- The Realm Town, a canceled fantasy theme park in Pleasant Grove, Utah

== See also ==
- Relm (disambiguation)
