= Song for a Future Generation =

- U.S. vinyl single

Single by the B-52's

from the album Whammy!
- B-side: "Planet Claire"
- Released: 1983
- Recorded: 1983
- Genre: New wave
- Length: 4:00
- Label: Warner Bros.; Island
- Songwriter: The B-52's
- Producer: Steven Stanley

The B-52's singles chronology
"Whammy Kiss" (1983)	"Song for a Future Generation" (1983)	"Summer of Love" (1986)

"Song for a Future Generation" is a song by American new wave band the B-52's. The song was released as the third single from their third studio album Whammy! (1983), peaking at No. 63 on the UK singles chart. It is the first of two songs by the B-52's to feature more than three band members singing lead vocals, the second being "Theme for a Nude Beach" from their follow-up studio album Bouncing off the Satellites (1986).

== Concept and lyrics ==
The song's lyrical content made implicit references to "familiar media images of glamorous people, [like] 'The Empress of Fashion' and 'The Captain of the Enterprise'" and describes "a goofy series of mythic couples meeting to populate the future."

== Music video ==
A music video was filmed to accompany "Song for a Future Generation" for promotion on television. It features the band members performing the song on podiums and swings and in a Brady Bunch style split screen. The video also features the female members of the band wearing outlandish wigs, including one made of golden tinsel, one with a chicken wire frame (nicknamed "the bird cage") and one bouffant atop which sat a giant bow made from wig-hair.

== Live performances ==
In a 1983 music concert at the Forest Hills Tennis Stadium, the band sang live vocals with a prerecorded backing track. The band later stopped playing the song live after the death of guitarist Ricky Wilson on October 12, 1985. Wilson had a spoken word section in the song, and the band felt it wasn't right to perform it without him.

== Reception ==
=== Critical reception ===
The song garnered positive reviews from music critics, who praised of the song's concept and praised its lyrics. Rolling Stone described the song as "mock-utopian" but felt that the song was "self-conscious." Stephen Holden from The New York Times described the song as "an amusing evocation of the current [sic] baby boom" and fun but serious. Music critic Robert Christgau commented that the song "is a completely affectionate, completely undeluded look at the doomed, hopeful, cheerfully insincere dreams and schemes of the kids who dance to B-52's songs."

The song continues to be highly regarded retrospectively. Stephen Thomas Erlewine, writing for AllMusic, noted "Song for a Future Generation" as one of the best songs off of Whammy!, going on to state that the song is one of the "B-52's classics."

=== Commercial Reception ===
The song reached number 63 on the UK singles chart, peaking in its second week and spending a total of three weeks on the tally. It was the group's highest-peaking single in nearly three years, their last single to crack the Top 75 of the UK Singles Chart being "Give Me Back My Man," from "Wild Planet" (which reached number 61).

== Cover versions ==
Electronica band Chicks on Speed remade the song for their 2000 albums, The Unreleases and Re-Releases of the Un-Releases as well as their 2000 EP Chix 52, which is an EP full of the B52s covers.

== Track listing ==
UK vinyl 12" single

Side A

1. "Song for a Future Generation"
2. "Song for a Future Generation" (Instrumental)

Side B

1. "Planet Claire"

UK 2 x vinyl 7" single

1. "Song for a Future Generation"
2. "Song for a Future Future Generation" (Instrumental)
3. "Planet Claire"
4. "There's a Moon in the Sky (Called the Moon)"

== Charts ==
Chart (1983)	Peak position
UK Singles (OCC)	63
