= Whammy Kiss =

Single by the B-52's

from the album Whammy!
- B-side: "Song for a Future Generation"
- Released: 1983
- Recorded: 1982
- Studio: Compass Point (Nassau, the Bahamas)
- Genre: New wave; synth-pop
- Length: 5:20
- Label: Island; Warner Bros.
- Songwriters: Kate Pierson; Fred Schneider; Keith Strickland; Ricky Wilson; Cindy Wilson
- Producer: Steven Stanley

The B-52's singles chronology
"Legal Tender" (1983)	"Whammy Kiss" (1983)	"Song for a Future Generation" (1983)

Official audio
- "Whammy Kiss" on YouTube

"Whammy Kiss" is the second single released by American band the B-52's from their third studio album Whammy! (1983).

The song reached number nine on the U.S. Hot Dance Club Play chart, along with the album tracks "Legal Tender" and "Song for a Future Generation."

== Track listing ==
1. "Whammy Kiss" – 5:20
2. "Song for a Future Generation" – 7:54

== Chart positions ==
Charts	Peak position
U.S. Billboard Hot Dance Club Play	9
