= Juliet of the Spirits (song) =

Single by the B-52s

from the album Funplex
- Released: September 9, 2008
- Recorded: 2007
- Genre: Techno; electropop
- Length: 4:22
- Label: Astralwerks
- Songwriters: Kate Pierson; Fred Schneider; Keith Strickland; Cindy Wilson
- Producer: Steve Osborne

The B-52s singles chronology
"Funplex" (2008)	"Juliet of the Spirits" (2008)

"Juliet of the Spirits" is a song recorded by American rock band the B-52s. It is the second single from the band's eighth full-length studio album, Funplex. A digital single and remix were released on September 9, 2008.

The song was inspired by the film Juliet of the Spirits (Italian: Giulietta degli spiriti), a 1965 drama about an Italian housewife directed by Federico Fellini. The song's lyrics project themes of sexual liberation and awakening.

== Track listing ==
1. "Juliet Of The Spirits" (Zoned Out Mix) – 4:54
2. "Juliet Of The Spirits" (Dan McKie Vocal Mix) – 8:17
3. "Juliet Of The Spirits" (Glenn Morrison & Bruce Aisher Mix) – 8:01
4. "Juliet Of The Spirits" (Morgan Page Mix) – 6:57

== Charts ==
Chart (2008)	Peak position
U.S. Billboard Hot Dance Club Play	8
