= Funplex =

Album by the B-52s

Studio album by the B-52s
- Released: March 25, 2008
- Recorded: September 2006 – November 2007
- Genres: Rock; pop rock; dance-pop; electropop; new wave
- Length: 48:17
- Label: Astralwerks
- Producer: Steve Osborne

The B-52s chronology
Nude on the Moon: The B-52's Anthology (2002)	Funplex (2008)	With the Wild Crowd! Live in Athens, GA (2011)

Singles from Funplex
- 1. "Funplex" Released: January 29, 2008; 2. "Juliet of the Spirits" Released: September 9, 2008

Professional ratings
Aggregate scores
Source	Rating
Metacritic	64/100
Review scores
Source	Rating
AllMusic	3/5 stars
BBC Music	(favorable)
Billboard	(favorable)
Blender	3/5 stars
Entertainment Weekly	B+
Pitchfork	6.6/10
PopMatters	7/10 stars
Robert Christgau	A−
Slant	3/5 stars
Spin	3.5/5 stars

Funplex is the seventh studio album by American rock band the B-52s, recorded during 2006 and 2007. The album was released on March 25, 2008, by Astralwerks Records. It was the first album of new material the group had released since Good Stuff in 1992, although the band did record two new songs for their 1998 compilation album Time Capsule: Songs for a Future Generation.

== Single releases ==
The first single from the album was released on January 29, 2008, and is the title track, "Funplex". A music video was filmed in West Hollywood on March 1, 2008, and featured a cameo appearance by RuPaul, who had previously appeared in the video for "Love Shack".

Funplex debuted at number 11 on the U.S. Billboard 200 chart, selling about 30,000 copies in its first week.

The second single from the album was "Juliet of the Spirits".

== Alternate versions ==
The CD, packed in the Digipak format, was released in three, front cover color variants of the lettering in the album title and the band's shadows: the original (shown above) in gray, multi-colored, and hot pink. In the colored versions, the coloring covers the band's instruments while the band members themselves, along with the band's logotype, retain their original rendering throughout all versions.

Exclusive, limited-edition autographed copies were offered by Newbury Comics and FYE, as well during the Funplex 2008 tour, and a special limited-edition double-disc set of Funplex was available only at Target stores in the US. The bonus disc features five live tracks recorded at the band's November 16, 2007, concert at the Roxy in Los Angeles. Two additional live tracks from that same concert were available exclusively on iTunes.

== Track listing ==
All songs written and arranged by the B-52s, music by Keith Strickland and lyrics and vocal melodies by Kate Pierson, Fred Schneider and Cindy Wilson.

1. "Pump" – 4:53
2. "Hot Corner" – 3:24
3. "Ultraviolet" – 4:25
4. "Juliet of the Spirits" – 4:22
5. "Funplex" – 4:07
6. "Eyes Wide Open" – 5:35
7. "Love in the Year 3000" – 4:14
8. "Deviant Ingredient" – 4:50
9. "Too Much to Think About" – 3:47
10. "Dancing Now" – 4:02
11. "Keep This Party Going" – 4:31

Japanese edition bonus track

12. "Funplex" (CSS Remix) – 4:25

iTunes-exclusive deluxe version bonus tracks

12. "Private Idaho" (Live at the Roxy) – 4:00
13. "Planet Claire" (Live at the Roxy) – 5:28

Target-exclusive bonus CD: Live at the Roxy in L.A.

1. "Party Out of Bounds" – 3:45
2. "Channel Z" – 5:26
3. "Roam" – 5:13
4. "Strobe Light" – 4:38
5. "Rock Lobster" – 5:33

== Personnel ==
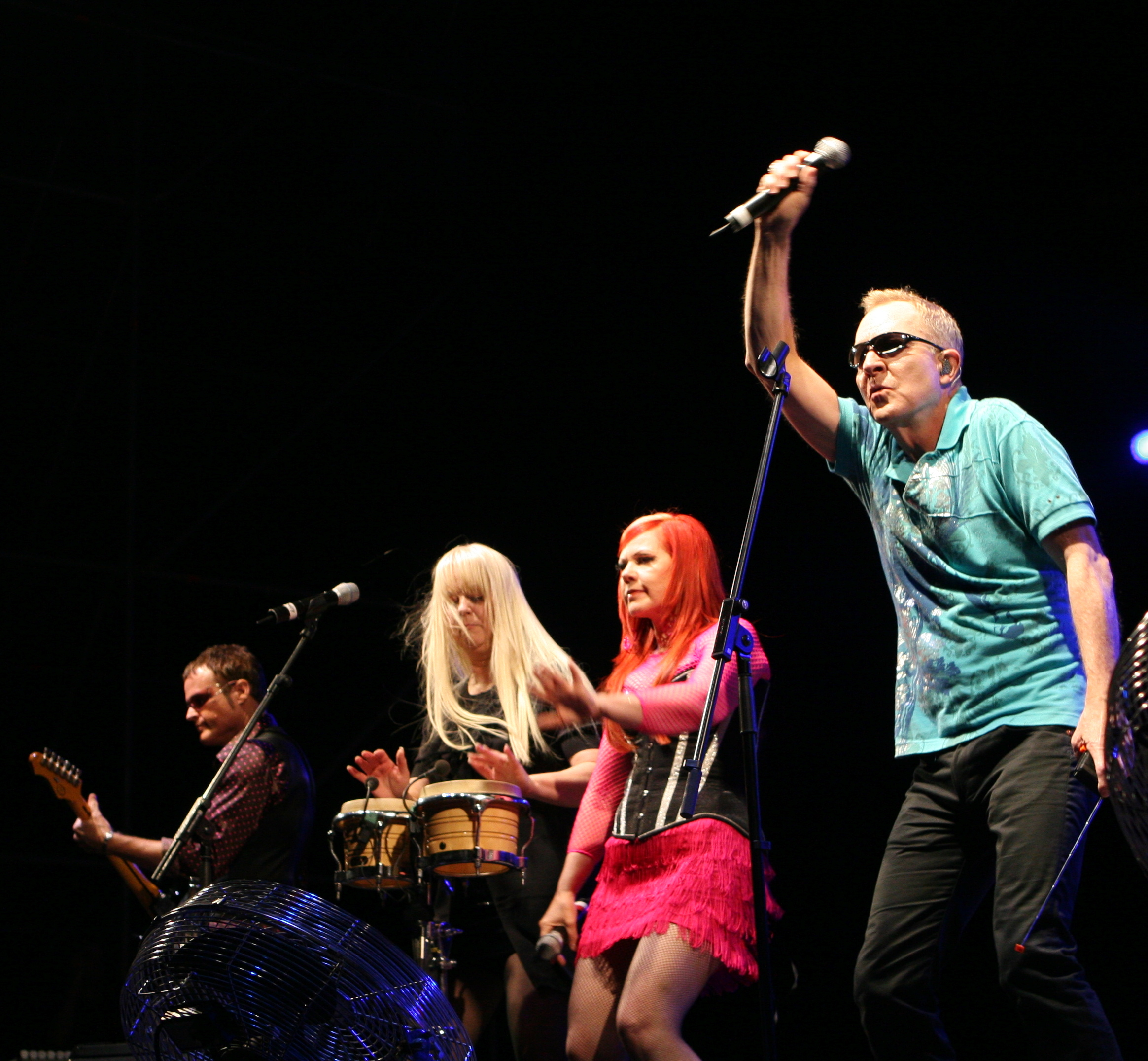
The B-52s onstage in 2008

The B-52s

- Fred Schneider – vocals, cowbell (track 6)
- Kate Pierson – vocals
- Cindy Wilson – vocals
- Keith Strickland – guitars, keyboards, programming, bass (tracks 1–2 & 11)

Additional musicians

- Tracy Wormworth – bass (tracks 1, 3, 8 & 11)
- Zachary Alford – drums (tracks 1, 3, 5, & 8–9)
- Sterling Campbell – drums (tracks 2, 6–7 & 10–11)
- Steve Osbourne – organ (tracks 1 & 3), bass & timpani (track 9)
- Pete Davis – keyboards, synth programming (tracks 2, 4, 6–8 & 10–11) drum programming (tracks 4 & 7)
- Dave McCracken – programming (tracks 5 & 9)
- Damian Taylor – effects programming (tracks 1, 3, 5, & 8–9)
- Sharon Adl-Doost – intro vocal (track 1)

Production

- Producer: Steve Osborne
- Engineers: Dan Austin, Rick Morris, Pete Davis, Keith Strickland, Kris Sampson
- Mixing: Steve Osborne
- Mastering: Bob Ludwig

Artwork

- Art direction and design: Jeri Heiden & John Heiden
- Photography: Joseph Cultice
- Music: Gerard Kelly, Kristofer Buckle
- Stylist: Robert Molnar

== Charts ==
Chart (2008)	Peak position
Australian Albums (ARIA)	93
Belgian Albums (Ultratop Flanders)	67
French Albums (SNEP)	104
German Albums (Offizielle Top 100)	38
Scottish Albums (Official Charts)	77
Swiss Albums (Schweizer Hitparade)	71
UK Albums (Official Charts)	73
US Billboard 200	11
