= Butterbean =

Butterbean may refer to:

- Lima bean Phaseolus lunatus, an edible legume
- Runner bean Phaseolus coccineus, grown both as an edible bean and as an ornamental plant
- Lablab known as butter bean in the Caribbean

== People ==
- Brenden Queen, American professional stock car racing driver
- Butterbean Love or Bob Love (1942–2024), retired American professional basketball player
- Eric Esch (born 1966), American boxer and mixed martial artist, better known by his nickname Butterbean

== Other uses ==
- "Butterbean", a song from The B-52's 1983 album Whammy!
- Eleanor Butterbean, a character in The Grim Adventures of Billy & Mandy
