= Hot corner =

Hot corner may refer to:

- Baseball's third base position
- A screen hotspot for a computer mouse pointer
- "Hot Corner", a song from the 2008 album Funplex by the rock band The B-52s.
