= Batbaby =

- cover artwork by George Doutsiopoulos

EP by The Superions
- Released: September 13, 2011 digital download
- Recorded: 2010, Winter Park, Florida
- Genres: Comedy, electropop, synthpop
- Length: 26:56
- Producer: The Superions

The Superions chronology
Destination... Christmas! (2010)	Batbaby (2011)	The Vertical Mind (2017)

Singles from Batbaby
- 1. "Batbaby" Released: September 13, 2011

"Batbaby" is the sixth single by comedy band the Superions, a side project of Fred Schneider of the B-52s. The single was released on September 13, 2011, as a digital download on the Batbaby EP.

The Batbaby EP also features remixes by DJ Beekeeni, DJ Butterface, Phylr and Umpff. In an interview with Atlanta magazine, Schneider attempted to explain his lyrical inspiration: "Oh, I don't know. Some songwriters come up with incredibly smart commercial things and I come up with 'Batbaby'."

== Track listing ==
1. "Batbaby" 3:22
2. "Batbaby (DJ Beekeeni Remix)"* 3:07
3. "Batbaby (DJ Butterface Remix)"** 3:55
4. "Batbaby (DJ Butterface Downtempo Remix)"** 4:11
5. "Batbaby (DJ Butterface vs. Phylr Remix)"*** 4:45
6. "Batbaby (Umpff Remix)"**** 3:41
7. "Batbaby (Umpff Dub Remix)"**** 3:56

== Personnel ==
Band

- Fred Schneider – lyrics and vocals
- Noah Brodie – keyboards and electronic drums
- Dan Marshall – programming

Additional musicians

- Amy Luther – backing vocals
- Rachel McCabe – backing vocals
- DJ Beekeeni – *additional remix and production
- DJ Butterface (Michael J. Bazini) – **additional remix and production
- DJ Butterface and Phylr – ***additional remix and production
- Umpff – ****additional remix and production (original master by Tim Harris/Headway Productions)

Production

- The Superions – producer, audio engineer, mixing
- Bob Katz – mastering at Digital Domain
- George Doutsiopoulos - artwork

== Music video ==
A music video was filmed in Winter Park and Orlando, Florida on October 10, 2011 (Ed Wood's birthday). The mini-movie video is sort of an homage to the beatnik/horror mashup genre of the ’60s. It is a 10-minute music video that merges film-making with music, similar to Michael Jackson's Thriller. The video debuted on YouTube on October 19, 2011, and the following day on the WOW Report James St. James declared Batbaby "an instant Halloween classic."
