= Just Fred =

Studio album by Fred Schneider
- Released: April 23, 1996
- Genre: Alternative rock; pop-punk
- Label: Reprise
- Producer: Steve Albini

Fred Schneider chronology
Fred Schneider and the Shake Society (1984/1991)	Just Fred (1996)	The Superions (2010)

So he enlisted my help in finding musicians. So many of my generation of underground musicians just absolutely worshipped Fred Schneider. Everybody just leapt at the opportunity. There was a long list of prospective names for the backing band, and Deadly Cupcake was not unanimous, but the near-unanimous choice. And that was Russell Simins from the Blues Explosion, Rick Didjit from the Didjits, and Tom Zaluckyj from the band Tar. Everybody that I approached about doing it immediately said yes, and then they also really fucking delivered. They really committed to the project. I thought it was great. I really enjoyed it.

—Engineer Steve Albini in 2024 on recording Just Fred

Just Fred is the second solo album by the American musician Fred Schneider, released in 1996. Its first single was "Bulldozer". Schneider promoted the album by playing shows with his band, the Slobs.

== Production ==
Produced by Steve Albini, the album was recorded in two weeks. Schneider was backed by Shadowy Men on a Shadowy Planet, Deadly Cupcake, and Six Finger Satellite. Consisting of members of the Jon Spencer Blues Explosion, the Didjits, and Tar, Deadly Cupcake was formed by Albini. Most of Schneider's vocals are in the same style that he uses with the B-52's, although electronic effects are added to "Secret Sharer", and "Helicopter" utilizes a conversational voice."

"Coconut" is a cover of the Harry Nilsson song; it first appeared on a Nilsson tribute album.

== Critical reception ==
Professional ratings
Review scores
Source	Rating
AllMusic	4.5/5 stars
Robert Christgau	(dud)
The Encyclopedia of Popular Music	3/5 stars
Fort Worth Star-Telegram	3/5 stars
The Huntsville Times	3/5
Knoxville News Sentinel	4/5 stars
Orange County Register	1/5 stars
Toronto Sun	4/5 stars

The Knoxville News Sentinel stated: "Schneider still uses his distinctive style—an emphatic shout/sing delivery with an ironic tone—but now it's accompanied by heavy angst as he sings about endangered freedon ('Helicopter'), betrayal ('Lick', 'Secret Sharer') and destruction ('Bulldozer')." Rolling Stone concluded that "Albini manages to make all these guitars sound authentic and contemporary, but Just Fred is as much a nod to the late-70s underground scene that spawned the B-52's, when the punk rock of the Ramones seemed just fine alongside the quirky pop of bands like Blondie and Talking Heads." The Huntsville Times declared that Just Fred "borders on inanity at times, but it's just as enjoyable as 'Love Shack' or 'Roam', and no one could argue that those tracks contributed to the salvation of mankind."

The Telegram & Gazette deemed the album "a bomb" and "an annoying drag of a record." The New York Times concluded that "with punk in the middle of a revival that takes itself seriously, Mr. Schneider has latched on to the pop flippancy amid punk's burly guitars ... Schneider treats punk rock as another kitschy source." The Atlanta Journal-Constitution determined that "a few tracks illuminate surprising similarities between Schneider's arch yelp and Johnny Rotten's—'Secret Sharer' could be a Never Mind the Bollocks outtake."

AllMusic called the album "a surprisingly enjoyable fusion of Schneider's bizarre charm and lean, loud alternative rock that proudly illustrates his punk roots."

== Track listing ==
All lyrics by Fred Schneider, music written as noted, except "Coconut" which is written by Harry Nilsson

1. "Whip" (Tim Mosher)
2. "Helicopter" (Richard Barone)
3. "Sugar in My Hog" † (Shadowy Men on a Shadowy Planet)
4. "Bulldozer" (Mosher)
5. "Coconut" (Arranged by Richard Barone)
6. "Center of the Universe" (John Coté)
7. "Radioactive Lady Eyeball" (Mosher)
8. "Lick" † (Shadowy Men on a Shadowy Planet)
9. "Bad Dream" †† (Richard Barone, Gary Lucas)
10. "Secret Sharer" † (Mosher)
11. "Stroke of Genius" †† (Mosher)

† = performed by Shadowy Men on a Shadowy Planet
†† = performed by Six Finger Satellite
All others performed by Deadly Cupcake

== Personnel ==
- Fred Schneider – piano; keyboards; vocals for all tracks
- Richard Barone – co-writer, "Helicopter", "Bad Dream"; arranger, "Coconut"
- Shadowy Men on a Shadowy Planet
  - Reid Diamond – bass
  - Don Pyle – drums
  - Brian Connelly – guitars
- Six Finger Satellite
  - Jay Ryan – TFA couplet maximizer
  - Richard Pelletier – drums
  - John MacLean – guitar, synth
  - James Apt – bass
- Deadly Cupcake
  - Rick Sims – guitar
  - Russell Simins – drums
  - Tom Zaluckyj – bass
