= Rough Night in Jericho =

Rough Night in Jericho may refer to:

- Rough Night in Jericho (album), a 1988 album by Dreams So Real
- Rough Night in Jericho (film), a 1967 western film starring Dean Martin
