= Party Out of Bounds =

Single by the B-52's

from the album Wild Planet
- Released: 1980
- Genre: New wave
- Length: 3:21
- Label: Warner Bros.
- Songwriters: Fred Schneider; Keith Strickland; Ricky Wilson; Cindy Wilson; Kate Pierson
- Producer: Rhett Davies

The B-52's singles chronology
"Private Idaho" (1980)	"Party Out of Bounds" (1980)	"Give Me Back My Man" (1980)

"Party Out of Bounds" is a song by American new wave band the B-52's, from their second album, Wild Planet (1980). Featured with the other dancefloor-bound tracks from the album, the song peaked at number five on the US Billboard Hot Dance Club Play chart in 1980 as an album cut and has long been a staple of alternative/new wave dance club playlists. Lyrically, the song is a guide on how to better plan house parties in order to prevent potential disasters. An instrumental dub mix was included on the B-side of the vinyl 45 rpm single "Private Idaho".

The following year, another mix of "Party Out of Bounds" appeared on the B-52's' Party Mix! EP, remixed by Daniel Coulombe and Steven Stanley to feature elements of the dub mix, embellished with echoes and additional keyboard effects. Two years later, Stanley produced and engineered the B-52's' 1983 album Whammy!.
