= The Superions =

American musical group

- Origin: Orlando, Florida, US
- Genres: Comedy, electropop, synthpop
- Years active: 2006–present
- Labels: Fanatic, Happy Happy Birthday to Me
- Spinoff of: The B-52s
- Members: Fred Schneider; Noah Brodie; Dan Marshall
- Website: facebook.com/thesuperions

The Superions are an American comedy synthpop band formed in Orlando, Florida, in 2006 as a side project of the B-52s frontman Fred Schneider with Noah Brodie and Dan Marshall.

== History ==
The band, originally named the Del Morons, was founded in 2006 by Fred Schneider and friends Noah Brodie and Dan Marshall. Schneider first met Brodie and Marshall, vinyl nuts like him, in 2002 through a mutual friend who has a record store in Orlando, Florida. Eventually, whenever in Orlando, Schneider began staying with Brodie and Marshall at their home and turned them on to lounge and tiki music.

During a stay in December 2006, Brodie and Marshall played Schneider a track they had composed using Pro Tools and asked Schneider if he would put words to it. Schneider came up with the lyrics for "Totally Nude Island" off the top of his head and, because of Brodie and Marshall's noisy pet azure lovebird, Mr. Bird, recorded the vocals in the bathroom in two takes. It started out as Schneider, Brodie and Marshall just having a good time, but friends who heard the song suggested they put it out.

The trio changed their name to the Superions and self-released "Totally Nude Island" as a digital single on October 31, 2008. The Superions then asked Ursula 1000 to do a remix of "Totally Nude Island" and released "Totally Nude Island (Ursula 1000 Remix)" as a digital single on December 18, 2008.

The reaction was such that Schneider spoke to Mike Turner, founder of the Athens, Georgia, independent label Happy Happy Birthday To Me Records, about putting out a limited edition vinyl single. A deal was hatched and it was decided to do a full EP release with the addition of two reworked songs from the Del Morons period, "Those Sexy Saucer Gals" and "Who Threw That Ham at Me", and remixes by the Lolligags, Casper & the Cookies and Marshmallow Coast. "Who Threw That Ham at Me" was released as a digital single on November 24, 2009, and The Superions EP was released as a digital download on January 19, 2010. The Superions EP was released on CD and limited edition 12-inch single on HHBTM Records in the US on February 23, 2010. In April 2010, Brodie and Marshall completed work on a remix of rapper Shunda K's single, "I'm Da Best". From April until June 2010, the Superions held a remix contest for their song "Those Sexy Saucer Gals", the Swedish band WeHaveLove was chosen as the winner and "Those Sexy Saucer Gals (WeHaveLove Remix)" was released as a digital single on August 24, 2010, and the video by Tom Yaz was released on YouTube on August 27, 2010. The remix was later released on the digital bonus track version of The Superions EP.

The Superions began recording new material for a full-length album in January 2010, but during a nine-day session in May, they switched gears to focus on a full-length Christmas album, Destination... Christmas! They put the finishing touches on Destination... Christmas! during another recording session in June and completed mixing in July. The Superions signed with New York-based record label Fanatic Records distributed by EMI/Caroline Distribution for the release of Destination... Christmas! Schneider says the 11 original tracks "cover all the Christmas themes: yetis, avalanches, fruitcake. It's not traditional." The digital single "Fruitcake" was released on September 21, 2010, followed by the release of Destination... Christmas! on October 25, 2010, on CD, LP and as a digital download. Destination... Christmas! debuted at No. 13 on the Billboard Comedy Albums chart on December 18, 2010. "Fruitcake (Yacht Remix)" was released on December 20, 2010, as a free download on Yacht's website. In February 2011 the Superions continued working on songs for a proper full-length album during a week-long recording session, they then resumed recording in May 2011.

"Batbaby", a song which was recorded in May 2010, was planned as the group's next single for Halloween. The Batbaby EP, released September 13, 2011, also features remixes by DJ Beekeeni, DJ Butterface, Phylr and Umpff. In an interview with Atlanta magazine, Schneider attempted to explain his lyrical inspiration: "Oh, I don't know. Some songwriters come up with incredibly smart commercial things and I come up with 'Batbaby'." The music video for "Batbaby" pays homage to B-movies, and was filmed on the birthday of Ed Wood.

"Konnichiwa" was released as a digital download on May 12, 2014, the first single from The Vertical Mind which was released June 23, 2017, on Happy Happy Birthday to Me Records.

"Head On A Leg" was released as a limited edition 7" vinyl on November 23, 2018 for Record Store Day with the B-sides "The Love That Knew No Shame" and "Granny's Patchwork Quilt". "Batbaby" was re-released for Halloween on October 11, 2019 as a limited edition 7" vinyl with the B-side "Real Scary Halloween Story". Destination... Christmas! was reissued for Christmas on CD and vinyl with new artwork on November 23, 2023.

"Fruitcake (Dave Audé Remix)" was released November 12, 2026 on Audacious Records. The Dave Audé remix united Fred Schneider & The Superions with Lisa & Dawn in a celebration of music, friendship and holiday fun. Grammy-winning producer Audé had collaborated with Lisa & Dawn for three years, earning three Top 10 hits on the UK’s Music Week charts. His longstanding relationship with The Superions’ Noah Brodie helped bring this holiday collaboration together. During work on Lisa & Dawn’s Christmas album, a conversation among Fred, Noah and Dave led to an invitation for the duo to contribute to the remix. Longtime fans of Fred’s work with The B-52s, Lisa & Dawn welcomed the opportunity as an early holiday gift.

== Members ==
- Fred Schneider – vocals
- Noah Brodie – keyboards, electronic drums and guitar
- Dan Marshall – programming and keyboards

== Discography ==
=== Albums ===
- Destination... Christmas! (2010)
- The Vertical Mind (2017)

=== EPs ===
- The Superions (2010)
- Batbaby (2011)

=== Singles ===
- "Totally Nude Island" (2008)
- "Totally Nude Island (Ursula 1000 Remix)" (2008)
- "Who Threw That Ham at Me" (2009)
- "Those Sexy Saucer Gals (WeHaveLove Remix)" (2010)
- "Fruitcake" (2010)
- "Batbaby" (2011)
- "Konnichiwa" (2014)
- "Head On A Leg" (2018)
- "Fruitcake (Dave Audé Remix)" (2026)

=== Remixes ===
- Shunda K "I'm Da Best (The Superions Remix)" (2010)

=== Videos ===
- "Totally Nude Island (Ursula 1000 Remix)" (2008)
- "Who Threw That Ham at Me" (2009)
- "Those Sexy Saucer Gals (WeHaveLove Remix)" (2010)
- "Fruitcake" (2010)
- "Santa's Disco" (2010)
- "Crummy Christmas Tree" (2010)
- "Santa Je T'aime" (2010)
- "Batbaby" (2011)
- "Glitter Gulch" (2018)
- "Chillin' At Christmas" (Previously Unreleased) (2018)
- "Laughter At Christmas" (Previously Unreleased) (2018)
- "Fruitcake (Dave Audé Remix)" (2026)
