= Change (Cindy Wilson album) =

Studio album by Cindy Wilson
- Released: December 1, 2017
- Studios: The Space Station, Athens, GA
- Genres: Synth-pop; dance-pop; electronica; psychedelic pop
- Length: 38:08
- Label: Kill Rock Stars
- Producer: Suny Lyons

Cindy Wilson chronology
Supernatural (2017)	Change (2017)	Realms (2023)

Change is the debut solo album by Cindy Wilson of the B-52's. Crowdfunded by PledgeMusic, it’s her third solo effort after the release of two EPs: Sunrise (released in September 2016) and Supernatural (released in February 2017).

Wilson has stated that she had been working on the album for several years with her solo band, first as a collaboration for gigs and then a more consistent project. Change features ten tracks, consisting of eight original compositions and two covers (New Colony Six’s “Things I’d Like to Say” and Oh-OK’s “Brother”). Although it did not chart on any major charts, critics praised the low-tempo synth electronica direction that Wilson took on this release and the album achieved a 74% positive score on Metacritic. An official video was released for "Brother".

== Track listing ==
All tracks are written by Cindy Wilson, Ryan Monahan and Suny Lyons, except where noted.

Change track listing
No.	Title	Writer(s)	Length
1.	"People Are Asking"		3:33
2.	"Stand Back Time"		4:23
3.	"No One Can Tell You"		3:40
4.	"Change"		3:12
5.	"Mystic"		3:42
6.	"Things I'd Like To Say"	Ronald Rice	5:00
7.	"Sunrise"		3:27
8.	"On The Inside"		4:31
9.	"Brother"	Carol Levy, Mark Rizzo	2:53
10.	"Memory"		3:43

== Singles ==
1. Mystic (2017). Promo single, digital and physical CDs sent to radio.
2. No One Can Tell You (2017). Promo single, digital and physical CDs sent to radio.
3. Brother (2017). Promo single, digital and physical CDs sent to radio. It featured an official music video.
4. On The Inside (2017). Promo single, digital and physical CDs sent to radio.
5. No One Can Tell You/Ballistic (Live From PressureDrop.tv) (2018). Limited 7" (300 copies). Video recordings of both tracks are available on YouTube.
