= Destination... Christmas! =

Destination… Christmas!

Studio album by The Superions
- Released: October 25, 2010
- Recorded: January–July 2010, Winter Park, Florida
- Genres: Christmas, comedy, electropop, synthpop
- Length: 40:02
- Labels: Fanatic, Happy Happy Birthday to Me
- Producer: The Superions

The Superions chronology
The Superions (2010)	Destination… Christmas! (2010)	Batbaby (2011)

Singles from Destination... Christmas!
- 1. "Fruitcake" Released: September 21, 2010

Professional ratings
Review scores
Source	Rating
AllMusic	4/5 stars
PopMatters	3/10

Destination... Christmas! is the first full-length studio album by comedy synthpop band the Superions, a side project of Fred Schneider of the B-52s. The album was released October 25, 2010, on New York-based record label Fanatic Records distributed by EMI/Caroline Distribution on CD, LP and as a digital download. The single "Fruitcake" was released on iTunes ahead of the album on September 21, 2010.

Fred Schneider said about the album that the 11 original tracks "cover all the Christmas themes: yetis, avalanches, fruitcake. It's not traditional."

The album was reissued on November 23, 2023, with the band’s name changed to Fred Schneider & the Superions. The new artwork was created by Happy Happy Birthday to Me Records for both CD and vinyl editions.

== Track listing ==
1. "Santa's Disco" 3:54
2. "Fruitcake" 3:36
3. "Chillin' at Christmas" 4:18
4. "Teddy and Betty Yeti" 4:29
5. "Christmas Conga (Jungle Bells)" 3:48
6. "Jingle Those Bells" 2:48
7. "Under the Tree" 3:42
8. "Crummy Christmas Tree" 2:33
9. "Laughter at Christmas" 2:19
10. "Christmas Tears" 4:15
11. "Santa Je T'aime" 4:21

== Personnel ==
Band

- Fred Schneider – lyrics, vocals, sleigh bells and drum sticks
- Noah Brodie – keyboards, electronic drums, vocals, backing vocals, sleigh bells and drum sticks
- Dan Marshall – programming, vocals and backing vocals

Additional musicians

- Backing vocals on "Santa's Disco": Amy Luther and Rachel McCabe
- The Crummy Christmas Carolers: Lashunda Flowers, Tedra Hawthorne, Bill Ludicke, Amy Luther, Rachel McCabe, Deb Ofsowitz, Kimber Parrish, Chris Shelton, Karyn Shelton

Production

- All songs written and arranged by the Superions
- Lyrics by Fred Schneider
- Music by Noah Brodie and Dan Marshall
- Produced by the Superions
- Recorded and Mixed by The Superions in Winter Park, Florida January–July 2010
- Mastered by Bob Katz at Digital Domain, Longwood, Florida
- Additional Mix by Jarrett Pritchard
- Illustrations: Brian Fraley
- Photography: Caitlin Sullivan

== Charts ==
Destination... Christmas! debuted at No. 13 on the Billboard Comedy Albums Chart on December 18, 2010.
