= Give Me Back My Man =

Single by the B-52's

from the album Wild Planet
- Released: July 1980
- Recorded: April 1980
- Studio: Compass Point (Nassau, Bahamas)
- Genre: New wave; post-punk
- Length: 3:52
- Label: Island; Warner Bros.
- Songwriters: Fred Schneider; Ricky Wilson; Keith Strickland; Cindy Wilson
- Producers: Rhett Davies; the B-52's

The B-52's singles chronology
"Party Out of Bounds" (1980)	"Give Me Back My Man" (1980)	"Legal Tender" (1983)

Official audio
- "Give Me Back My Man" on YouTube

"Give Me Back My Man" is a song by the American rock band the B-52's. It was first released as a single in the UK and other countries in July 1980, and featured as the fourth track of their second studio album, Wild Planet, released in August 1980. The song is one of many solo vocal performances from Cindy Wilson in the band's earlier years.

== Critical reception ==
In a 1980 review, Record Mirror described "Give Me Back My Man" as "A web of musical intrigue ... Emotional vocals with a backdrop of instrumentation continually varying in texture. Quite good really." Trouser Press highlighted "Cindy Wilson's Patsy Cline-influenced singing." AllMusic said that the song "allows Cindy Wilson a unique opportunity to croon a broad, expressive melodic line." Mike Mills, bassist of R.E.M., named "Give Me Back My Man" when asked about his favourite music in 1991.

In the 2023 book The Story of the B-52s, Scott Creney and Brigette Herron wrote: "A processed swooshing guitar swells up at the beginning of each verse, and the mix is littered with electronic popping sounds. The unnatural compression on Keith's drums and the layers of Cindy's voice over the outro conspire to create an otherworldly ambience." They claimed that "'Give Me Back My Man' hits even harder than 'Dance This Mess Around', its 'heartbroken Cindy' counterpart from the previous album."

== Releases ==
"Give Me Back My Man" was released as the second single from the album Wild Planet in 1980. A remixed version was released as a single from Party Mix! in 1981.

== Live performances ==
"Give Me Back My Man" was a staple in the B-52's' concerts in the 1980s and was usually one of the first few songs played. Early on, it was played mostly as it was on the record, with Schneider adding glockenspiel. After the release of the Party Mix! album in 1981, the band performed "Give Me Back My Man" and others in the extended style in which they were presented on that album. The song was re-integrated into the set of the B-52's' 2008 Funplex tour.

== Track listing ==
Original release

1. "Give Me Back My Man" – 3:52
2. "Give Me Back My Man" – 3:42 (instrumental)

Remix

1. "Give Me Back My Man"
2. "Party Out Of Bounds (Instrumental Version)"

== Chart performance ==
The song charted on the U.S. Hot Dance Club Play chart along with album track "Party Out of Bounds" and prior single "Private Idaho", reaching number five (chart rules at the time allowed multiple album tracks to occupy the same position together). Released as a single in the UK, it hit number sixty-one on the UK Singles Chart.

== "Weird Al" Yankovic version ==
The main melody of "Give Me Back My Man" was incorporated into the "Weird Al" Yankovic song "Mr. Popeil" from the studio album "Weird Al" Yankovic in 3-D (1984), along with female backing vocals that imitate some of the mannerisms of Kate Pierson and Cindy Wilson.
