= Fred Schneider and the Shake Society =

Studio album by Fred Schneider
- Released: 1984, re-released 1991
- Studio: Blank Tape Studios (New York City)
- Genre: Pop rock; dance-rock; synth-rock
- Label: Warner Bros.
- Producer: Fred Schneider; Bernie Worrell

Fred Schneider chronology
Fred Schneider and the Shake Society (1984)	Just Fred (1996)

Singles from Fred Schneider and the Shake Society
- 1. "Monster" Released: 1984

Professional ratings
Review scores
Source	Rating
AllMusic	2.5/5 stars

Fred Schneider and the Shake Society is the debut solo studio album by American new wave musician Fred Schneider, released in 1984 by Warner Bros. Records. It was re-released in 1991 as Fred Schneider.

Musicians and backing vocalists varied from track to track. Notable names included co-producer Bernie Worrell on keyboards, synthesizers and/or backing vocals on several tracks, as well as Schneider's B-52's bandmate Kate Pierson on backing vocals on four tracks, including "Monster" (in addition to appearing in its music video).

The song "Monster" peaked at No. 85 on the Billboard Hot 100 in July 1991, and its music video was included that year on the VHS video compilation The B-52's: 1979–1989.

In November 2020, Schneider released a new music video for the song "This Planet's a Mess".

== Track listing ==
Lyrics by Fred Schneider, music by John Coté, except as noted.

Track times on original release and 1991 re-release—which sometimes differ greatly—are both listed.

Side one

1. "Monster" – 3:30 / 3:56 *
2. "Cut the Concrete" – 4:02 / 4:01 *
3. "Summer in Hell" – 4:19 / 4:21 *
4. "Orbit" (Schneider, Ronald Ardito, Richard Beau) – 4:24 / 4:29
5. "I'm Gonna Haunt You" – 4:00 / 3:55

Side two

1. "It's Time to Kiss" (duet with Patti LaBelle) – 5:30 / 5:50 *
2. "This Planet's a Mess" – 4:07 / 4:12
3. "Wave" – 4:30 / 4:31
4. "Boonga (The New Jersey Caveman)" – 4:45 / 4:28

* Remixed by Michael Vail Blum for 1991 re-release.

== Personnel ==
Credits are adapted from the Fred Schneider and the Shake Society liner notes.

Musicians

- Fred Schneider – piano, keyboards, vocals
- Kate Pierson – backing vocals (side 1, tracks 1, 3, 5; side 2, track 4)
- John Coté – guitars, memorymoog, Mega synthesizer bass, drum programming, background vocals
- Lamar Mitchell – vocoder
- Ronnie Ardito – drum programming
- Hellions – background vocals
- Leslie Ming – drums
- Bernie Worrell – synthesizer, clavinet, vocoder
- Tom Beckerman – guitar (side 1, tracks 1–3; side 2, tracks 2, 4)
- Trevor Gayle – kettle drums
- Steve Scales – cabassa
- Shailah Edmonds – background vocals
- Billy Amendola – drums
- Eluriel "Tinker" Barfield – drum fills
- Ronald Drayton – guitar
- Ronnie Ardito – guitar, keyboards, background vocals
- Chris Schneider – background vocals
- B.J. Nelson – background vocals
- Richard Beau – percussion
- Robert Molnar – drum programming, background vocals
- Lisa Lubitz – background vocals
- Patti LaBelle – vocals (side 2, track 1)
- Geoffrey Armes – percussion

Technical

- Fred Schneider – producer, arranger, art direction, design
- Bernie Worrell – producer, additional arrangements
- John Coté – arranger
- Butch Jones – engineer, additional arrangements
- Rob Casoria – assistant engineer
- Mark Kamins – mixing (side 1, track 2; side 2, track 4)
- Phil Brown – mastering
- George DeBose – design, photography
- Robert Molnar – fashion
- Jane Pittman – makeup

== Charts ==
Singles

Year	Single	Chart	Position
1991	"Monster"	Billboard	85
