= Father's House =

Studio album by Dreams So Real
- Released: 1986
- Genre: Rock
- Label: Coyote
- Producer: Peter Buck

Dreams So Real chronology
Father's House (1986)	Rough Night in Jericho (1988)

Father's House is the debut album by the Athens, Georgia, rock band Dreams So Real. It was released by Coyote Records in 1986, and was produced by R.E.M. guitarist Peter Buck. It was distributed by Twin/Tone Records.

== Critical reception ==
Professional ratings
Review scores
Source	Rating
AllMusic	2/5 stars
Los Angeles Daily News	C
The Philadelphia Inquirer	1/4 stars

The Philadelphia Inquirer determined that "there are a few good, dreamy melodies here, but for the most part, this Southern rock band trades too heavily on its musical resemblance to R.E.M." The Washington Post wrote that, "if guitarist Barry Marler's Byrdsisms are too familiar ... the trio's consistent writing and playing make Father's House one of the more serviceable byproducts of the burgeoning folk-rock revival." The Los Angeles Daily News opined that, "taken in large doses, Dream So Real's hypnotic flower-power sounds are just too lethargic."

== Track listing ==
1. "History"
2. "Heaven"
3. "Drifting Away"
4. "The Tower"
5. "Father's House"
6. "Maybe I'll Go Today"
7. "Capitol Mall"
8. "Up to Fate"
9. "Birds of a Feather"
10. "Canadian Girl"
