= Gloryline =

Studio album by Dreams So Real
- Released: 1990
- Genre: Rock
- Length: 44:28
- Label: Arista
- Producer: Joe Hardy

Dreams So Real chronology
Rough Night in Jericho (1988)	Gloryline (1990)	Nocturnal Omissions (1992)

Gloryline is the third album by the Athens, Georgia, rock band Dreams So Real, released in 1990. The band supported the album by touring with Melissa Etheridge.

== Production ==
The album was produced by Joe Hardy. "Day After Day" is a cover of the Badfinger song. The title track is about recognizing one's racial biases. Cindy Wilson sang on a track.

== Critical reception ==
Professional ratings
Review scores
Source	Rating
AllMusic	3/5 stars
Dayton Daily News	3/4 stars

The Dayton Daily News wrote that "lead singer Barry Marler provides strong vocals... His style and the general sound of Dreams So Real are similar to that of the Alarm." The Tampa Tribune dismissed the album as "straight-ahead, mid-tempo, generic rock with a touch of twang."

The State determined that "it rocks harder than previous Dreams So Real discs, capturing the full force of the band's live shows." Trouser Press concluded that "Dreams So Real are still caught between two conflicting impulses—big-league rock power and carefully detailed grassroots richness."

== Track listing ==
All songs written by Barry Marler except as indicated.

1. "Gloryline"
2. "Stand Tall"
3. "We Have Danced the Night Away"
4. "The Knife Edge" (Trent Allen / Barry Marler)
5. "Overton Park/Faith"
6. "Here Comes the Train"
7. "Day After Day" (Pete Ham)
8. "Here to Speak My Mind"
9. "World Gone Mad"
10. "Long Road"
11. "The Fine Line"
