= The Superions (EP) =

- US CD cover

EP by the Superions
- Released: January 19, 2010
- Recorded: 2006–2009, Orlando, Florida
- Genres: Comedy, electropop, synthpop
- Length: 25:19
- Label: Happy Happy Birthday to Me
- Producer: The Superions

The Superions chronology
The Superions (2010)	Destination... Christmas! (2010)

Limited Edition 12-inch cover

Digital "Bonus Track Version" cover

Singles from The Superions
- 1. "Totally Nude Island" Released: October 31, 2008; 2. "Totally Nude Island (Ursula 1000 Remix)" Released: December 18, 2008; 3. "Who Threw That Ham at Me" Released: November 24, 2009

The Superions is the first EP by comedy synthpop band the Superions, a side project of Fred Schneider of the B-52s. The EP was released on January 19, 2010, as a digital download in the United States. On February 23, 2010, the EP was released on CD and limited edition 12-inch single in the US by Happy Happy Birthday to Me Records.

The EP includes remastered versions of the group's first two digital singles, "Totally Nude Island" and "Totally Nude Island (Ursula 1000 Remix)" and two new remixes of "Totally Nude Island" by the Lolligags and Marshmallow Coast (featuring Andy Gonzales, former member of Of Montreal). It also includes the single "Who Threw That Ham at Me" and "Who Threw That Ham at Me (Casper & the Cookies Remix)" (featuring Jason NeSmith, also a former member of Of Montreal). A digital bonus track version was released on March 1, 2011, and included the track "Those Sexy Saucer Gals (WeHaveLove Remix)".

Professional ratings
Review scores
Source	Rating
Cleveland Scene	(Positive)
Goldmine	4/5 stars
San Diego Reader	(Positive)

== Track listing ==
No.	Title	Length
1.	"Those Sexy Saucer Gals"	2:34
2.	"Who Threw That Ham at Me"	3:46
3.	"Totally Nude Island" (The Lolligags remix)	3:20
4.	"Who Threw That Ham at Me" (Casper & The Cookies remix)	3:03
5.	"Totally Nude Island" (Ursula 1000 remix - new remastered version)	4:04
6.	"Totally Nude Island" (Marshmallow Coast remix)	4:26
7.	"Totally Nude Island" (new remastered version)	4:05
8.	"Those Sexy Saucer Gals" (WeHaveLove remix - digital only bonus track)	3:56

=== Formats ===
- CD US Edition - containing the seven-track EP
- 12-inch US limited edition - containing the seven-track EP, first pressing of 300 on clear/smoke vinyl, 200 black vinyl, silkscreened sleeve with mp3 download code
- Digitalbonus track version - containing the seven-track EP plus the bonus track "Those Sexy Saucer Gals (WeHaveLove Remix)"

== Personnel ==
Band

- Fred Schneider - vocals
- Noah Brodie - keyboards
- Dan Marshall - programming

Additional musicians

- Ryan Breegle - *additional remix and production
- Leslie Dallion - *additional vocals
- Jason NeSmith - **additional remix and production
- Ursula 1000 - ***additional remix and production
- Andy from Denver with Trimmer-Tronic - ****additional remix and production

Production

- Producer: The Superions
- Mastering: Bob Katz at Digital Domain
- Additional Mixing: Wally Walton at Greg Rike Productions
- Additional Mixing: +Robin Reumers at Digital Domain
- Management: Dave Brodie
- Artwork: Mike Turner (credited as Sleeve McQueen on the CD)
