= Relm =

Relm may refer to:

- Mike Relm (born 1978), also known as DJ Relm, a turntablist
- Relm Foundation, a charitable organization formerly part of the William Volker Fund

Fictional characters:

- Relm Arrowny, a character in the Final Fantasy VI video game
- Jake Relm, a character played by Nicholas Brendon in the Scifi Channel film Fire Serpent

== See also ==
- Realm (disambiguation)
