= Realms (album) =

Studio album by Cindy Wilson
- Released: August 25, 2023
- Genre: Electronic; pop
- Length: 31:42
- Language: English
- Label: Kill Rock Stars
- Producer: Suny Lyons; Cindy Wilson

Cindy Wilson chronology
Change (2017)	Realms (2023)

“It’s [like] a slow baking cake, which sometimes is better. And because you were so tense during COVID times, it was definitely a relief to be able to be creative. It’s a psychological thing. I like working—I feel like it’s an important thing to do because I enjoy it, and it’s healthy for me to do it.”

—Cindy Wilson on recording Realms

Realms is the second full-length studio album by American pop singer Cindy Wilson, released by Kill Rock Stars in 2023. The album is a mix of disco, electronic, and new wave music, and has received positive reviews from critics.

== Reception ==
Editors at AllMusic rated this album 4 out of 5 stars. Critic Heather Phares wrote that it pairs the strengths of The B-52's with a stronger vocal delivery than on Wilson's 2017 album Change, describing the work as "a graceful portrait of a turning point in Wilson’s life and an impressive addition to her work as a solo artist". Katherine Yeske Taylor of American Songwriter considers this music "playful and unpredictable" with its mix of genres. Michael Gallucci of Ultimate Classic Rock wrote that the album "expands that palette a bit more but never travels out of the familiar havens of her or electronic music's pasts" and is "firmly tied to what Wilson does best" and considers Wilson's solo work inferior to The B-52's.

== Track listing ==
All songs written by Suny Lyons and Cindy Wilson

1. "Midnight" – 2:49
2. "Overboard" – 3:01
3. "Daydreamer" – 2:38
4. "Wait" – 3:16
5. "Hold On" – 3:30
6. "Within" – 3:14
7. "Delirious" – 3:33
8. "Blossom" – 3:08
9. "Find Me" – 3:21
10. "Not Goodbye" – 3:13

== Personnel ==
- Cindy Wilson – vocals, instrumentation, production
- Sterling Campbell – drums
- Maria Kindt – strings
- Suny Lyons – artwork, production

== See also ==
- List of 2023 albums
