= Rough Night in Jericho (album) =

Studio album by Dreams So Real
- Released: 1988
- Genre: Rock
- Label: Arista
- Producer: Bill Drescher

Dreams So Real chronology
Father's House (1986)	Rough Night in Jericho (1988)	Gloryline (1990)

Rough Night in Jericho is the second album by Athens, Georgia, rock band Dreams So Real. Their first album for Arista Records, it was released in 1988. The band supported the album with a North American tour.

The album reached No. 150 on the Billboard album charts, and the title track reached No. 28 on the Billboard Mainstream Rock chart.

== Critical reception ==
The Philadelphia Inquirer wrote that "songs like 'Bearing Witness' and 'City of Love' operate like mini-suites, complete with ecstatic peaks and tension-building valleys and lots of momentum (but no excess, as dictated by power-trio tradition) in between." The St. Petersburg Times praised the "roaring and jangling guitars, uplifting choruses and a relentless tenacity that can't be tamed by the sterile confines of the recording studio." The Atlanta Journal-Constitution deemed the album "a blend of ringing 1960s folk rock and hard rock tinged with today's pop sensibilities."

== Track listing ==
All songs written by Barry Marler, except where noted.

1. "Rough Night in Jericho"
2. "Heart of Stone"
3. "Bearing Witness"
4. "Victim" (Marler, Trent Allen)
5. "California" (Marler, Allen)
6. "City of Love" (Marler, Allen, Drew Worsham)
7. "Open Your Eyes"
8. "Distance"
9. "Melanie"
10. "Love Fall Down"

== Personnel ==
- Barry Marler – lead vocals and guitar
- Trent Allen – bass and backing vocals
- Drew Worsham – drums
