= Dreams So Real =

American alternative rock band

- L - R: Worsham, Allen, Marler

Background information
- Origin: Athens, Georgia, United States
- Genres: Rock, alternative
- Years active: 1983–1993 (reunions: 2009, 2012, 2019)
- Labels: Arista Records
- Website: Dreams So Real Official Website; Dreams So Real on Facebook @DreamsSoReal on Twitter

Dreams So Real was an American alternative rock band from Athens, Georgia, who gained national exposure in the late 1980s and early 1990s. They recorded three albums, including two releases on Arista Records.

== History ==
The trio was led by songwriter Barry Marler on lead vocals and guitar, with Trent Allen on bass and backing vocals and Drew Worsham on drums. Sheryl Crow guitarist Peter Stroud was a member during the band's later years. Formed in 1983 when its members met in an Athens record store, their debut single, "Everywhere Girl" produced by Peter Buck of R.E.M., was released in 1985 and was very successful on college radio. Buck also produced their first album, 1986's Father's House. The band gained a bit more exposure by performing their song "Golden" (called "Steps" in the movie's end notes) in Athens, GA: Inside/Out, a rock documentary on their hometown music scene.

Dreams So Real signed to Arista Records and released Rough Night in Jericho in 1988. The title track earned some success, reaching No. 28 on the Billboard Mainstream Rock Chart and receiving heavy MTV airplay. A follow-up single, "Bearing Witness" also cracked Billboard's Rock Chart. The album would reach the Billboard Hot 200, peaking at No. 150.

The 1990 follow-up album, Gloryline, met with less success both critically and commercially. Soon after, Arista dropped the band and Dreams So Real soon drifted apart. As a kind of parting gift, the band released a collection of outtakes, rarities and B-sides titled Nocturnal Omissions, made available through their fan-club mailing list, and while on tour.

== After the breakup ==
Marler and Allen briefly reformed with the band Ether in the late 1990s, but have since appeared to have mostly left music behind. Marler is a bioinformatics analyst at the University of Georgia, while Allen became a graphic artist and entrepreneur as founder of Baseline SportsMedia, a company specializing in graphic design and fan photography.

In 2003 drummer Drew Worsham was shot in the face during a home invasion by a man who was reported to be Worsham's girlfriend's ex-boyfriend. Reports said the man subsequently kidnapped and fatally shot the girlfriend before putting a bullet through his own head. Worsham miraculously survived as the bullet lodged in his cheek bone and never reached his brain, and has recovered to return to his post-Dreams So Real music projects as well as his work as a computer systems analyst.

The band received mention in a number of R.E.M. biographies detailing their success and importance to the scene, including Marcus Gray's It Crawled from the South and David Buckley's R.E.M.: Fiction. Dreams So Real also appears in the "Athens, GA - Inside Out" movie, which is available on DVD.

The band reunited in 2009 for Athfest and again in 2012 for two shows in Atlanta and their hometown of Athens. Around that time, they re-established a web presence at dreamssoreal.com, which has been fairly dormant since 2012. Marler has also performed some shows as part of a new combo called Sticks & Bones.

== Discography ==
- "Everywhere Girl b/w Whirl" - 45 rpm single - 1985
- Father's House - Coyote Records - 1986
- Rough Night in Jericho - Arista Records - 1988
- Gloryline - Arista Records - 1990
- Nocturnal Omissions - Self-released - 1992
