= Funplex (song) =

Single by the B-52s

from the album Funplex
- A-side: "Funplex"
- Released: January 29, 2008
- Recorded: 2007
- Genre: Pop rock; new wave; dance-pop
- Length: 4:07 (album version); 3:16 (radio edit)
- Label: Astralwerks
- Songwriter: The B-52s
- Producer: Steve Osborne

The B-52s singles chronology
"Love Shack '99" (1999)	"Funplex" (2008)	"Juliet of the Spirits" (2008)

"Funplex" is a song recorded by the B-52s. It is the title track and first single from the band's eighth full-length studio album Funplex. The single was released to iTunes Store's internationally as a digital download on January 29, 2008.

== Remixes ==
Remixes of the track by Peaches, Cansei de Ser Sexy and Scissor Sisters were released digitally on March 5, 2008.

== Music video ==
A music video was filmed in West Hollywood on March 1, 2008, and featured a cameo appearance at the end by RuPaul, who had appeared in the video for "Love Shack". The video features the band performing in a CGI shopping mall and premiered on MySpace on March 26, 2008.

== References to mall culture ==
Lyrics in the song, "Private property–hippie be quiet / Your peace sign T-shirt / Could cause a riot" refer to the 2003 Crossgates Mall T-shirt censorship controversy.

The 'Cansei de Ser Sexy' remix of "Funplex" is featured on Just Dance (2009). It was also featured on Just Dance 3 (2011) as a downloadable track for the Xbox 360, but became unavailable for purchase following the removal of most DLCs from the Xbox 360 Marketplace on August 20, 2023.

== Track listing ==
1. "Funplex" (CSS Remix) – 4:25
2. "Funplex" (CSS Extended Remix) – 5:04
3. "Funplex" (CSS Instrumental) – 5:00
4. "Funplex" (CSS Edit) – 3:20
5. "Funplex" (Peaches Pleasure Seeker Remix) – 4:42
6. "Funplex" (Peaches Pleasure Seeker Instrumental) – 4:42
7. "Funplex" (Peaches Pleasure Seeker Edit) – 2:58
8. "Funplex" (Scissor Sisters Witches At The Wet Seal Remix) – 8:32
9. "Funplex" (Scissor Sisters Witches At The Wet Seal Instrumental) – 8:32
10. "Funplex" (Scissor Sisters Witches At The Wet Seal Edit) – 4:10

== Chart performance ==
Chart (2008)	Peak position
US Dance Club Songs (Billboard)	14
