= Realm (magazine) =

Realm is a picture magazine available in the United Kingdom. It focuses on sites and topics of interest to tourists from North America, and carries frequent coverage of the British royal family and British government. The magazine was renamed Discover Britain in 2011. Discover Britain is published by the Chelsea Magazine Company.
