= Nocturnal Omissions =

Compilation album by Dreams So Real
- Released: 1992
- Genre: Rock
- Label: self-released

Dreams So Real chronology
Gloryline (1990)	Nocturnal Omissions (1992)

Nocturnal Omissions was the final release by the American band Dreams So Real. It was self-released in 1992. it was a collection of rare tracks.

== Track listing ==
1. "(Maybe I'll Go) Today"
2. "Heaven"
3. "Window"
4. "History"
5. "Up To Fate"
6. "Golden"
7. "Everywhere Girl"
8. "Whirl"
9. "And So We Love"
10. "Open Your Eyes"
11. "Entwined"
12. "A Shipwrecked Sailor"
13. "Appalachee Shoals"
14. "Please Don't Cry"
15. "In The Garden"
16. "Egypt"
17. "There's A Fire"
18. "Red Lights (Merry Christmas)"
19. "Just For Christmas Day"
