= Whammy! =

Studio album by the B-52's
- Released: April 27, 1983
- Recorded: December 1982
- Studios: Compass Point (Nassau, the Bahamas)
- Genres: New wave; synth-pop
- Length: 37:17 (first pressing); 37:29 (second pressing)
- Labels: Warner Bros.; Island
- Producer: Steven Stanley

The B-52's chronology
Mesopotamia (1982)	Whammy! (1983)	Bouncing Off the Satellites (1986)

Singles from Whammy!
- 1. "Legal Tender / Moon 83" Released: 1983; 2. "Whammy Kiss" Released: 1983 (Germany); 3. "Song for a Future Generation / Trism" Released: 1983

Whammy! is the third studio album by American new wave band the B-52's, released on April 27, 1983, by Warner Bros. (US) and Island Records (Europe, Japan). It was recorded at Compass Point Studios in Nassau, the Bahamas, in December 1982 and produced by Steven Stanley. The album spawned three singles: "Legal Tender", "Whammy Kiss", and "Song for a Future Generation".

The album entered the Billboard 200 twice in 1983, reaching both number 29 and 171 throughout the year, while "Legal Tender" reached the Billboard Hot 100 chart, as well as the Billboard Hot Dance Club Play Singles chart alongside its two respective singles.

The band's goal with Whammy! was to update their signature sound with drum machines and synthesizers. The album was also the first to feature vocal performances by all five members of the band, as exemplified in "Song for a Future Generation". This was the final album the B-52s released before guitarist and founding member Ricky Wilson died of AIDS in 1985, although he appears posthumously on their next studio album, Bouncing Off the Satellites (1986).

== Recording ==
The B-52's initially conceived Whammy! in early 1982, during a visit to Compass Point Studios, where the band commenced re-recordings of three unreleased songs: "Butterbean", "Big Bird", and "Queen of Las Vegas". All three tracks were originally intended to be included on their previous release, Mesopotamia (1982), but none were completed, due to pressure and time constraints from Warner Bros. and their manager Gary Kurfirst. The album's remaining six songs ("Legal Tender", "Whammy Kiss", "Song for a Future Generation", "Trism", "Don't Worry", and "Work That Skirt") were recorded in December 1982, again at Compass Point Studios.

Unlike their previous studio albums, all instruments on Whammy! were played exclusively by Keith Strickland and Ricky Wilson. Both played the guitar and keyboards, while Strickland played the drums and Wilson played the bass. Remarking on the band's new focus on electronic instrumentation, singer/instrumentalist Kate Pierson later called the recording "a transitional album." Additionally, Pierson stated that drummer Strickland "didn't want to play drums anymore, so Whammy! featured drum machines and some synthesizers. It was kind of a big change in sound, which I wasn't really for very much. I didn't really like the drum machine. It was a different sound, but Whammy! was very much based around that". However, she added that, during the subsequent concert tour, the band would alternate between using drum machines and live drums played by Strickland.

Producer Steven Stanley supported Wilson and Strickland's initial concept of mixing the album into one continuous track, in a manner similar to the band's remix album, Party Mix! (1981). However, both Kurfirst and Warner Brothers vetoed this decision in favor of a more traditional method of track sequencing.

== Release ==
The album was released on April 27, 1983. On initial pressings of the LP, the seventh track was "Don't Worry", a cover version of the Yoko Ono song "Don't Worry, Kyoko (Mummy's Only Looking for Her Hand in the Snow)". However, the song was removed on later pressings due to legal issues and replaced with "Moon 83". The song is a remake of their earlier track "There's a Moon in the Sky (Called the Moon)" from the band's 1979 eponymous debut studio album, released as the B-side of the "Legal Tender" single.

== Reception ==
=== Commercial ===
Whammy! was a commercial success, spawning the hit singles "Legal Tender", "Whammy Kiss", and "Song for a Future Generation". The album entered the Billboard 200 twice in 1983, reaching both number 29 and 171 throughout the year, while "Legal Tender" reached the Billboard Hot 100 chart, as well as the Billboard Hot Dance Club Play Singles chart alongside "Whammy Kiss" and "Song for a Future Generation".

=== Critical ===
Professional ratings
Review scores
Source	Rating
AllMusic	3.5/5 stars
PopMatters	8/10
Rolling Stone	3/5 stars
The Rolling Stone Album Guide	2/5 stars
Select	3/5
Spin Alternative Record Guide	7/10
The Village Voice	A−

Critical reception for Whammy! was positive at the time of its release. Most critics regarded the album as a return to form after the band's previous release, Mesopotamia, which they felt strayed too far from the band's signature sound. Praise was given to the drum machines and synthesizers, which created upbeat and highly danceable songs, as well as the tight lyrics and over the top vocals.

Rolling Stone's Christopher Connelly, while referring to Mesopotamia as "underrated", was pleased with the band's return to their trademark style, and felt that even with the addition of Devo-style keyboards, producer Steven Stanley had "kept the band's basic strengths intact: breakneck tempos, deliciously uninhibited singing and an earnest enthusiasm for some of the universe's less-celebrated pleasures". He particularly praised Pierson, Cindy Wilson, and Fred Schneider's vocals. While remarking that the entirety of side two is "a waste", he concluded, "What is important is that this band is having fun again - and in this age of dopey novelty songs and cheesy dance tracks, nobody does it better." Robert Christgau of The Village Voice continued his support, making it a "Pick Hit" and stating that while the band "still pick up some great ideas at interplanetary garage sales, their celebration of the pop mess-around is getting earthier."

Stephen Thomas Erlewine of AllMusic later said the album was "certainly entertaining, even with its faults," praising the songs "Legal Tender", "Whammy Kiss", "Butterbean", and "Song for a Future Generation", and overall regarding the album as a strong follow-up to Mesopotamia, though he criticized the album's overuse of drum machines and synthesizers. Ben Wener of The Spectator commented favorably on Whammy!, describing it as an "overlooked gem".

== Track listing ==
All tracks are written by the B-52's, except where noted.

Side one
No.	Title	Length
1.	"Legal Tender" (Lyrics: Robert Waldrop)	3:40
2.	"Whammy Kiss"	5:20
3.	"Song for a Future Generation"	4:00
4.	"Butterbean"	4:14

Side two
No.	Title	Length
1.	"Trism"	3:23
2.	"Queen of Las Vegas"	4:40
3.	"Don't Worry" (Yoko Ono)	3:50
4.	"Big Bird"	4:14
5.	"Work That Skirt"	3:48
Total length:		37:17

Alternative track on side two on later pressings and editions of the album
No.	Title	Length
3.	"Moon 83"	3:58

== Personnel ==
The B-52's

- Cindy Wilson – vocals
- Kate Pierson – vocals
- Fred Schneider – vocals
- Ricky Wilson – keyboards, guitars, bass, vocals on "Song for a Future Generation"
- Keith Strickland – keyboards, guitars, drums, vocals on "Song for a Future Generation"

Additional musicians

- Ralph Carney – saxophone on "Big Bird"
- David Buck – trumpet on "Big Bird"

Technical

- Steven Stanley – producer, engineer
- Benjamin Armbrister – assistant engineer
- Dennis Halliburton – assistant engineer
- Ted Jensen – mastering
- Gene Greif – art direction
- Phyllis of Tiffany Wigs – "wig-do's"
- Vikki Warren – dresses
- William Wegman – cover photography

== Charts ==
Chart (1983)	Peak position
Australian Albums (Kent Music Report)	97
German Albums (Offizielle Top 100)	40
New Zealand Albums (RMNZ)	42
Swedish Albums (Sverigetopplistan)	29
UK Albums (Official Charts)	33
US Billboard 200	29

== Certifications ==
Region	Certification	Certified units/sales
United States (RIAA)	Gold	500,000^{^}
^{^} Shipments figures based on certification alone.
