= Rock Lobster =

1978 single by the B-52's

- Warner Bros. vinyl rerelease

Single by the B-52's

from the album The B-52's
- B-side: "52 Girls" (DB); "6060-842" (Warner Bros.); "Private Idaho" (Warner Bros.); "Runnin' Around" (Island); "Planet Claire" (Island)
- Released: April 1978; July 1979 (re-release)
- Recorded: February 1978
- Studio: Stone Mountain Studios, Atlanta, Georgia, US; Compass Point, Nassau, Bahamas (re-release)
- Genre: New wave; dance-rock; surf rock; punk rock; psychedelic rock
- Length: 3:57 (radio edit); 4:52 (single version); 6:49 (album version)
- Label: DB; Warner Bros.; Island
- Songwriters: Fred Schneider; Ricky Wilson
- Producers: Kevin Dunn (single); Chris Blackwell (album)

The B-52's singles chronology
| "Rock Lobster" (1978) | "Planet Claire" (1979) |

Music video
- "Rock Lobster" on YouTube

"Rock Lobster" is a song by American band the B-52's, written by their singer Fred Schneider and guitarist Ricky Wilson. It was recorded and released as a single twice, first by DB Records as their debut release in April 1978, and re-recorded the following year for the band's self-titled debut album on Warner Bros. (US) and Island Records (Europe, Japan).

The song launched the band's career and became one of their signature tunes. "Rock Lobster" was well received by critics, and went on to place at No. 147 on Rolling Stone's 500 Greatest Songs of All Time list in December 2004. John Lennon said that he decided to record again in 1980, following a five-year hiatus, after hearing "Rock Lobster". The song also inspired the name of Athens, Georgia's professional ice hockey team, the Rock Lobsters.

== Composition and themes ==
The original DB Records single version has a duration of 4:37, and is faster in tempo and more "raw" than the 1979 single version, basically due to lower sound quality and the absence of a bassline. It has the same lyrics as the re-recorded version, but with more lines during the sequence that lists marine animals. The 1979 single version is edited down from the album version, which lasts about seven minutes and contains an additional verse.

According to a Behind the Vinyl video with B-52's singer Fred Schneider for CHBM-FM, the song was mostly inspired by the 2001 Club in Atlanta, where instead of having a light show, the club projected a slide show with pictures of puppies, babies, and lobsters on a grill.

The song's lyrics describe a beach party while mentioning both real and imagined marine animals ("There goes a dogfish, chased by a catfish, in flew a sea robin, watch out for that piranha, there goes a narwhal, here comes a bikini whale!"), with absurd noises accompanying each, provided by Kate Pierson on the higher-pitched sounds and Cindy Wilson the lower-pitched ones. The chorus features Pierson and Wilson singing a long "ahhh" at an ascending pitch, followed by Schneider exclaiming "rock lobster!"

"Rock Lobster" is written in the key of C minor (with the chorus in F minor) and is in common time. Instruments used in the music include a baritone-tuned surf-style Mosrite electric guitar, a Farfisa combo organ, and drums. Pierson played the song's bassline on a Korg SB-100 synthesizer in the 1979 version. Wilson's guitar is uniquely tuned to C-F-x-x-F-F, with the two center strings absent.

== Critical reception ==
New Musical Express ranked "Rock Lobster" number 13 on their critics' list of the best tracks of 1979. Robert Christgau placed it at number 8 on his "Dean's list" of that year's best singles. In 1980, Record World said that "The dance-oriented-rock band from Georgia has already charmed critics and cults. This quirky, intriguing cut from their self-titled LP should do the same for AOR-pop fans." Cash Box called the song a "silly yet utterly enjoyable affair."

British music writer Garry Mulholland included "Rock Lobster" in his 2002 book This is Uncool: The 500 Greatest Singles Since Punk and Disco, describing the song as "enormously complex in form". He highlighted its "incredible dance-rock rhythm section" and the "immediately unique and pleasurable" sound that the band had created, and concluded: "Sadly, I've only just worked out that, when Schneider hollers, 'That's satanic butter!' near the end, he's actually saying 'Pass the tanning butter.' No matter. I still believe that satanic butter exists and is the crucial ingredient in the preparation of a Rock Lobster."

Rolling Stone ranked "Rock Lobster" number 147 on its list of the 500 Greatest Songs of All Time, published in 2004. It was voted number 81 by the staff and contributors of Pitchfork on their 2016 list of the best songs of the 1970s.

Stephen Thomas Erlewine of AllMusic called the song "incredibly infectious" and "memorable". Pitchfork said: "It's constructed like prog rock, sounds like the avant-garde, has surreal lyrics and one of pop's most memorable guitar riffs." In their book The Story of the B-52s, Scott Creney and Brigette Herron wrote:

The "Rock Lobster" single managed to sound original by virtue of pulling from so many disparate touch points in the history of rock music. Musically, it combines elements of surf music, girl groups, and the avant-garde, powered by a series of riffs that classic rockers like Jimmy Page might have killed for. The song is so catchy that it's easy to miss how complicated it is. After the final verse (Motion in the ocean), the song starts changing sections so quickly it's hard to keep up. The structure is closer to prog-rock, or Brian Wilson's 'pocket symphony' "Good Vibrations", than anything typically found in new wave.

== Chart performance ==
The version of "Rock Lobster" released by Warner Bros. was the band's first single to appear on the Billboard Hot 100, where it reached No. 56. In Canada, the single went to No. 1 in the RPM national chart. "Rock Lobster" reached No. 37 on the UK Singles Chart in August 1979; when reissued as a double A-side with "Planet Claire" in 1986, it peaked at No. 12. In Australia, it peaked at No. 3 in 1980.

=== Weekly charts ===
| Chart (1979–1980) | Peak position |
|---|---|
| Australia (Kent Music Report) | 3 |
| Canada Top Singles (RPM) | 1 |
| New Zealand (Recorded Music NZ) | 38 |
| UK Singles (Official Charts) | 37 |
| US Billboard Hot 100 | 56 |
| US Billboard Hot Dance Club Play | 24 |
| US Cash Box | 74 |
| US Record World Singles Chart | 67 |

| Chart (1986) | Peak position |
|---|---|
| Ireland (IRMA) | 20 |
| UK Singles (Official Charts) | 12 |

=== Year-end charts ===
| Chart (1980) | Rank |
|---|---|
| Australia (Kent Music Report) | 34 |
| Canada Top Singles (RPM) | 20 |

== In popular culture ==
On January 26, 1980, the band appeared on Saturday Night Live, where they performed "Dance This Mess Around" and "Rock Lobster". Kurt Cobain and Dave Grohl mentioned seeing the B-52's in this TV episode as a memorable moment in their preteen lives.

In the spring of 1980, John Lennon, whose post-Beatles music career had been on hiatus for nearly five years while focusing on raising his son Sean, was prompted to record again after hearing "Rock Lobster". According to Lennon, "it sounds just like Ono's music, so I said to meself, 'it's time to get out the old axe and wake the wife up!'" His return to the studio led to the release of 1980's Double Fantasy, which would be his final album. At a 2002 B-52's concert in New York, Ono joined the band on stage for the performance of this song.

In the Pierce Brosnan episode of Muppets Tonight, the song is performed by a group of gun-toting lobsters that take control of the Muppet TV studio. The song appears in the Family Guy episodes "The Cleveland–Loretta Quagmire" (in which Peter plays it on guitar), and "Screams of Silence: The Story of Brenda Q" (as "Iraq Lobster"). In the 2007 movie Knocked Up, the song plays as the two main characters lead into their one-night stand. It also appears in the 2008 movie The Pirates Who Don't Do Anything: A VeggieTales Movie (as "Rock Monster").

Early Commodore Amiga 500 units had "B52/ROCK LOBSTER" etched on the main circuit board. The song is playable in the video games Donkey Konga, Rock Band 3, and Just Dance 4. The song's guitar riff was sampled by Panic! at the Disco for their song "Don't Threaten Me with a Good Time" from their fifth studio album Death of a Bachelor (2016).

On May 15, 2024, it was announced that the city of Athens, Georgia, where the B-52's were formed, would name their Federal Prospects Hockey League team the Rock Lobsters, honoring the song and the band. The decision came after an online poll that began in April 2024 closed with two options for a team name: The Rock Lobsters or the Classic City Panic. The former was the winner of a runoff poll, where it won over the latter by 565 votes. A large internet following also helped promote voting for the Rock Lobster option. A design contest was also held for the team's mascot.

== See also ==
- List of number-one singles of 1980 (Canada)
