= Planet Claire =

Single by the B-52's

from the album The B-52's
- B-side: "There's a Moon in the Sky (Called the Moon)"; "Downtown"
- Released: July 6, 1979
- Recorded: 1978–1979
- Genre: New wave; dance-rock
- Length: 4:35
- Label: Island; Warner Bros.
- Songwriters: Henry Mancini; Fred Schneider; Keith Strickland
- Producer: Chris Blackwell

The B-52's singles chronology
"Rock Lobster" (1979)	"Planet Claire" (1979)	"Dance This Mess Around" (1979)

Audio
- "Planet Claire" on YouTube

"Planet Claire" is a song the B-52's released in July 1979 as the second single from their debut studio album The B-52's. Based on Duane Eddy's version of Henry Mancini's "Peter Gunn" theme, the single reached number 43 on the Australian Kent Music Report chart and number 24 on the Billboard dance chart in the US.

Cash Box said that "bongos, Ventures-influenced guitar work and Morse code blips are calling all pop, AOR audiences to dance to this humorous follow up to 'Rock Lobster'." Record World said that "Planet Claire" had "an undeniable rhythm track" and "more unique synthesizer lines" compared to "Rock Lobster".

The Morse code message at the beginning of the song reads, "NAWS DE CFH - ZKR F1 3394.....", which is from a "call tape" recording transmitted by Canadian Forces Station Mill Cove in Hubbards, Nova Scotia.

In 2011, band member Kate Pierson expressed her dissatisfaction with the way engineer Robert Ash mixed her vocals with the Farfisa organ on the studio version, using effects to make her vocals "sound like a synthesizer", and stated that she prefers the sound of live performances of the song.

== Track listing ==
A-side
No.	Title	Writer(s)	Lead vocals	Length
1.	"Planet Claire"	Fred Schneider; Keith Strickland; Henry Mancini	Kate Pierson; Fred Schneider	4:35

B-side
No.	Title	Writer(s)	Lead vocals	Length
1.	"Downtown"	Tony Hatch, arranged by Cindy Wilson and Kate Pierson	Kate Pierson; Cindy Wilson	2:57
Total length:				7:30

== Personnel ==
- Fred Schneider – lead vocals, walkie-talkie
- Kate Pierson – Farfisa organ, keyboard bass, backing vocals
- Cindy Wilson – bongos
- Ricky Wilson – guitar
- Keith Strickland – drums, "Claire sounds"

== Chart positions ==
Chart (1980)	Peak position
Australia (Kent Music Report)	43
New Zealand (Recorded Music NZ)	35
US Billboard Hot Dance Club Play	24

Chart (1986)	Peak position
UK Singles (Official Charts) with "Rock Lobster"	12

== Cover version ==
While the original version appears during the end credits of the Annie Award winning 2009 DreamWorks Animation sci-fi comedy motion picture Monsters vs. Aliens, an instrumental cover version of the song performed by the Les Deux Love Orchestra is featured during Stephen Colbert's character President Hathaway's solo encounter with the alien robot.
