= Dance This Mess Around =

1979 single by the B-52's

- Original 1979 Japanese single cover

Single by the B-52's

from the album The B-52's
- B-side: "Lava" (Japan); "Rock Lobster" (Colombia)
- Released: 1979
- Recorded: March–April 1979
- Studio: Compass Point, Nassau, Bahamas
- Genre: New wave; dance-rock
- Length: 4:36
- Label: Island; Warner Bros.
- Songwriter: The B-52's
- Producers: Chris Blackwell; Robert Ash (co-producer)

The B-52's singles chronology
"Planet Claire" (1979)	"Dance This Mess Around" (1979)	"Private Idaho" (1980)

"Dance This Mess Around" is a song by American new wave band the B-52's. It was released in 1979 as the third and final single from their eponymous debut studio album. The song features Cindy Wilson on lead vocals, as well as Fred Schneider and Kate Pierson, and has become a live favorite, even 40 years after its release.

== Critical reception ==
Stephen Thomas Erlewine of AllMusic stated in his review of the band's debut album that, along with "Planet Claire" and "Rock Lobster", "It's all great fun, but [the album] wouldn't have resonated throughout the years if the group hadn't written such incredibly infectious, memorable tunes as ... 'Dance This Mess Around'." In his review of the track, Evan Sawdey of PopMatters mentions that "fans have known this track for years as not only one of the finest tunes the group has ever composed, but also one of the absolute best tracks of the era," and that "This, along with '52 Girls', are the kind of songs that gave the band's debut its distinct personality."

In their book The Story of the B-52s, Scott Creney and Brigette Herron wrote:

Dance This Mess Around's power is rooted in its slow buildup, the way Cindy takes her time before she explodes. When she appends the think it over line with her own roll it over in your mind, it's the first line in the song that doesn't sound borrowed from an old 60s song ... The third time she sings Why don't you dance with me? Cindy breaks the melody into something simultaneously more raw and melodic. It's an audacious choice, and Fred and Kate appear to suddenly turn the heartbreak into a party. They don't even have time to do all 16 dances before Cindy starts to feel better.

== In other media ==
The B-52's played the song on the TV show Saturday Night Live in January 1980, together with "Rock Lobster". Kurt Cobain and Dave Grohl mentioned seeing the B-52's on this TV episode as a memorable moment in their preteen lives.

"Dance This Mess Around" appears in the film Alex Strangelove.

== Personnel ==
- Cindy Wilson - vocals, tambourine
- Fred Schneider - vocals, toy piano
- Kate Pierson - synth bass, organ, vocals
- Ricky Wilson - guitar
- Keith Strickland - drums, percussion

== Chart positions ==
Chart (1980)	Peak Position
US Billboard Hot Dance Club Play	24
Australia (Kent Music Report)	43
New Zealand (Recorded Music NZ)	35

== Bibliography ==
- Creney, Scott; Herron, Brigette A. (2023). The Story of the B-52s: Neon Side of Town. Palgrave Macmillan. ISBN 978-3-031-22569-7.
