= Wild Planet =

Studio album by the B-52's
- Released: August 27, 1980
- Recorded: April 1980
- Studios: Compass Point (Nassau, Bahamas)
- Genres: New wave; disco-punk; surf rock
- Length: 34:44
- Labels: Warner Bros.; Island
- Producers: Rhett Davies; the B-52's

The B-52's chronology
The B-52's (1979)	Wild Planet (1980)	Party Mix! (1981)

Singles from Wild Planet
- 1. "Private Idaho" Released: October 1980; 2. "Give Me Back My Man" Released: 1980; 3. "Party Out of Bounds" Released: 1980

Wild Planet is the second studio album by American new wave band the B-52's, released in August 1980 by Warner Bros. (US) and Island Records (Europe, Japan).

As with their first album, the B-52's traveled to Compass Point Studios in the Bahamas to record Wild Planet. Several of the songs from the album had been concert staples since 1978. The band did not record them for their first album, as they had more songs than could fit in a quality LP record.

== Reception ==
=== Critical ===
Professional ratings
Review scores
Source	Rating
AllMusic	4.5/5 stars
Christgau's Record Guide	B+
The Encyclopedia of Popular Music	3/5 stars
MusicHound Rock	3.5/5 stars
PopMatters	8/10
(The New) Rolling Stone Album Guide	5/5 stars
Select	3/5
Smash Hits	8/10
Spin Alternative Record Guide	7/10

Billboard gave Wild Planet a positive review, calling it an improvement over the band's debut album and "a cinch for hot rotation in rock-oriented discos". Robert Christgau of The Village Voice observed, "'Party Out of Bounds' and 'Quiche Lorraine' are expert entertainments at best and the wacko parochialism of 'Private Idaho' is a positive annoyance. Only on 'Devil in My Car' and 'Give Me Back My Man' do they exploit the potential for meaning—cosmic and emotional, respectively—that accrues to the world's greatest new-wave kiddie-novelty disco-punk band."

Frank Rose of Rolling Stone felt that it "plainly lacks the relentless exuberance of the group's debut disc", which he considered "partly a result of the production: flatter and duller sounding than its predecessor". Conversely, New York Rocker wrote that Wild Planet "does a better job [than the first LP] of capturing Ricky Wilson's strangely-tuned riffing and the snap of Keith Strickland's drums." While Trouser Press thought the album had its "inspired moments", it concluded that "too much of the album, with its short length and recycled ideas, comes across as a pale imitation of its predecessor."

In a retrospective review for AllMusic, David Cleary thought the songs were "faster, tighter, and punchier than previously, though production values are not as wonderfully quirky and detailed", and highlighted the "cunning mix of girl group, garage band, surf, and television theme song influences, all propelled along by an itchy dance beat." In 2018, Pitchfork ranked Wild Planet number 183 on its critics' list of the 200 greatest albums of the 1980s.

=== Commercial ===
Wild Planet charted for 27 weeks on the Billboard 200, peaking at No. 18. Wild Planet was certified Gold by the RIAA.

== Track listing ==
Side one
No.	Title	Writer(s)	Length
1.	"Party Out of Bounds"	Fred Schneider; Keith Strickland; Ricky Wilson; Cindy Wilson; Kate Pierson	3:21
2.	"Dirty Back Road"	R. Wilson; Robert Waldrop	3:21
3.	"Runnin' Around"	Schneider; Strickland; R. Wilson; C. Wilson; Pierson	3:09
4.	"Give Me Back My Man"	Schneider; Strickland; R. Wilson; C. Wilson	4:00
5.	"Private Idaho"	Schneider; Strickland; R. Wilson; C. Wilson; Pierson	3:35

Side two
No.	Title	Writer(s)	Length
1.	"Devil in My Car"	Schneider; R. Wilson; C. Wilson; Pierson	4:28
2.	"Quiche Lorraine"	Schneider; Strickland; R. Wilson	3:58
3.	"Strobe Light"	Schneider; Strickland; R. Wilson	3:59
4.	"53 Miles West of Venus"	Strickland; R. Wilson; C. Wilson; Pierson	4:53
Total length:			34:44

== Personnel ==
The B-52's

- Kate Pierson
- Fred Schneider
- Keith Strickland
- Cindy Wilson
- Ricky Wilson

Technical

- Rhett Davies – producer, engineer
- The B-52's – producers
- Chris Blackwell – executive producer
- Benjamin Armbrister – assistant engineer
- Robert Waldrop – art direction
- Lynn Goldsmith – cover photography
- La Verne & Phyllis – hairdos
- Paul Bricker – makeup

== Charts ==
=== Weekly charts ===
Chart (1980–81)	Peak position
Australian Albums (Kent Music Report)	12
Canada Top Albums/CDs (RPM)	32
New Zealand Albums (RMNZ)	3
UK Albums (Official Charts)	18
US Billboard 200	18

=== Year-end charts ===
Chart (1980)	Position
New Zealand Albums (RMNZ)	50

== Certifications ==
Region	Certification	Certified units/sales
United States (RIAA)	Gold	500,000^{^}
^{^} Shipments figures based on certification alone.

== In popular culture ==
Film director Gus Van Sant referred to the song "Private Idaho" in the title of his 1991 film My Own Private Idaho and thanked the band in the film's credits, although he did not seek approval from the band to use it.

On Season 18 of the reality show RuPaul’s Drag Race, contestant Jane Don't paid homage to the album and Kate Pierson, in the runway category "80s Ladies", on episode 8 "Snatch Game of Love: Island Edition".

Don't received praise for her challenge and runway presentation from the judges panel and from the band, especially Pierson.
