= Private Idaho =

Single by the B-52's

from the album Wild Planet
- B-side: "Party Out of Bounds"
- Released: October 1980
- Studio: Compass Point (Nassau, Bahamas)
- Genre: Dance-rock; new wave
- Length: 3:35
- Label: Warner Bros.; Island
- Songwriters: Fred Schneider; Keith Strickland; Ricky Wilson; Cindy Wilson; Kate Pierson
- Producers: Rhett Davies; the B-52's

The B-52's singles chronology
"Dance This Mess Around" (1979)	"Private Idaho" (1980)	"Party Out of Bounds" (1980)

"Private Idaho" is a single released by American band the B-52's from their second studio album Wild Planet (1980).

== Composition ==
The B-52's are from Athens, Georgia, and never played a concert in Idaho until September 13, 2011, when they played at Eagle River Pavilion in Eagle, Idaho. In preparation of the event, the Idaho Statesman interviewed Fred Schneider about the song's meaning. "Idaho is pretty mysterious to all of us," he said. "I know it's a beautiful state, but then I know there's also a lot of crazy right-wingers and all that stuff. ...The song's about all different things. It's not like a parody of Idaho or anything."

== Reception ==
Cash Box called it "a contagious rock dancer" with a "rumbling big beat and surf guitar, with alien vocals." Record World called it a "catchy dance-rocker."

== Chart history ==
The single was their second Billboard Hot 100 chart entry, at #74. The single also peaked at #5 on the US Hot Dance Club Play, along with previous single "Give Me Back My Man" and "Party out of Bounds", both from Wild Planet. "Private Idaho" reached number 11 in Australia. It was the 83rd-biggest Australian hit of 1980.

=== Weekly charts ===
Chart (1980)	Peak position
Australia (Kent Music Report)	11
U.S. Billboard Hot 100	74
U.S. Cash Box Top 100	78
US Record World Singles Chart	79
U.S. Billboard Hot Dance Club Play	5

=== Year-end charts ===
Chart (1980)	Position
Australia (Kent Music Report)	83

== Popular culture ==
- Gus Van Sant heard the song while visiting Idaho in the early 1980s, and later used the song title for his 1991 movie, My Own Private Idaho.
- The song was featured in a scene in A Minecraft Movie, the live action sequences of which were set in Idaho.
