= Cindy Wilson =

American musician (born 1957)

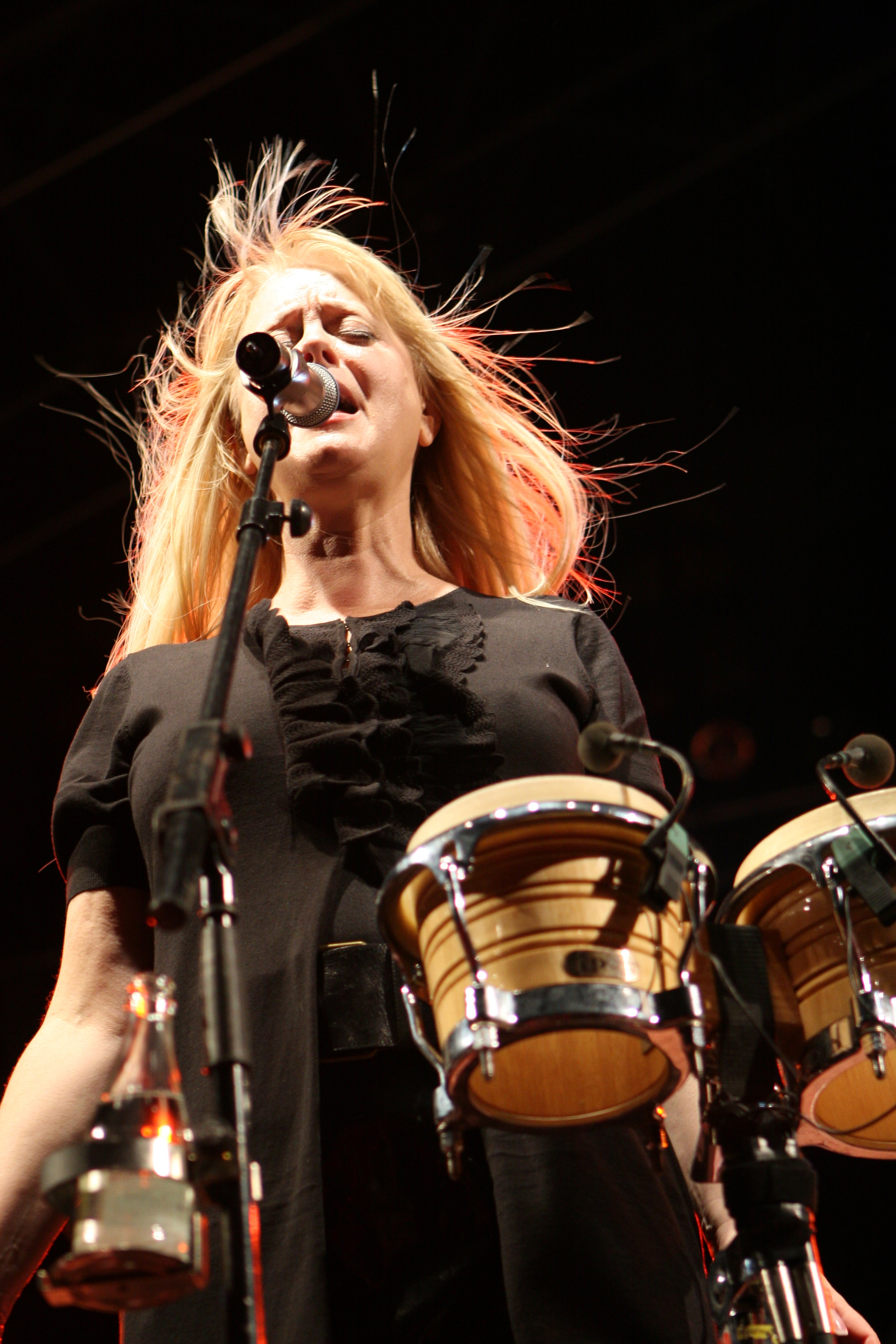
- Wilson performing with The B-52's in Barcelona, 2008

Background information
- Born: Cynthia Leigh Wilson; February 28, 1957 (age 69); Athens, Georgia, U.S.
- Genres: New wave; alternative rock
- Occupations: Singer; musician; songwriter
- Instruments: Vocals; percussion; guitar
- Years active: 1976–present
- Labels: Warner Bros.; Reprise; Astralwerks; Kill Rock Stars
- Member of: The B-52's

Cynthia Leigh Wilson (born February 28, 1957) is an American musician and one of the vocalists, songwriters, and founding members of new wave rock band the B-52s. She is noted for her distinctive contralto voice and also plays percussion during live shows. She is the younger sister of the late guitarist Ricky Wilson (1953–1985), who was also a founding member of the band.

In addition to her work with the B-52's, Wilson has released three solo EPs, Sunrise (2016), Supernatural (2017), and Second Sight (2025) In late 2017, she released her debut solo album, Change, via the independent label Kill Rock Stars. Wilson released her second solo album, Realms, in August 2023.

== Biography ==
=== 1957–1975: Early life ===
Wilson was born February 28, 1957 in Athens, Georgia. She had one elder brother, Ricky. When Ricky was 13 years old, he began learning to play guitar, and invited the younger Cindy to harmonize along with his instrumentation.

=== 1976–1984: Career beginnings and The B-52s ===
The B-52s were formed when Wilson, her brother Ricky, keyboardist and backing vocalist Kate Pierson, drummer and percussionist Keith Strickland, and lead vocalist Fred Schneider played an impromptu musical jam session after sharing a tropical Flaming Volcano drink at a local Chinese restaurant. Pierson, Ricky Wilson and Strickland had considered forming a band after taking a post-college vacation of Europe. The band played their first concert in 1977 at a Valentine's Day party for their friends in Athens. Wilson, then 19 years old, was the youngest member of the band.

The group recorded and released their debut album The B-52's in 1979, released through Warner Bros. Records, which yielded the charting singles "Rock Lobster" and "Planet Claire" and launched the band into stardom. The album peaked at number 7 on the U.S. Billboard 200, and was also especially popular in Australia. "The record companies were looking for new wave punk, and we fit the bill because they thought we were very original," Wilson recalled. "We got some money to support us, and then we could concentrate on growing our shows a little more and writing more music." From their inception, the band drew attention for their flamboyant stage attire, which included Wilson and Pierson donning beehive hairdos and go-go boots.

The band released their second album, Wild Planet, in 1980, during which time they pooled their income together to purchase a house in upstate New York, where they all lived together and recorded material. Their third studio album, Whammy!, was released in 1983, also through Warner Bros. Records.

=== 1985–1993: Mainstream success and hiatus ===
On April 21, 1985, Wilson married Keith Bennett, a successful advertiser who was a longtime friend of the band and Ricky's guitar tech on tour. Her brother, Ricky, died later that year of an AIDS-related illness, leaving her devastated. She recalled of his illness and death:

Ricky didn't tell me what was going on. I can't tell you what was in his mind. I was shocked and a lot of things I had to deal with because Ricky didn't confide in me. It kind of threw me for a loop when all of a sudden I got a phone call from the hospital saying 'your brother's dying'. And then I never did get to say goodbye to him. So it really screwed me up.

The band had recorded the bulk of their fourth release, Bouncing Off the Satellites (1986) prior to Ricky Wilson's death. The group subsequently took a hiatus, returning three years later with their fifth album, Cosmic Thing (1989), which featured drummer Keith Strickland assuming the role of lead guitarist in Ricky Wilson's absence. The album featured several highly successful singles, including "Roam" and "Love Shack", both of which went on to become two of the band's signature tracks.

Wilson took a sabbatical from the band in 1990 to concentrate on raising a family of two children, during which time the B-52's recorded and released the album Good Stuff as a trio of Pierson, Schneider and Strickland. During the live tour to promote Good Stuff in 1992 and 1993, Julee Cruise sang as a replacement for Wilson.

=== 1994–present: Return to the B-52's, solo work ===
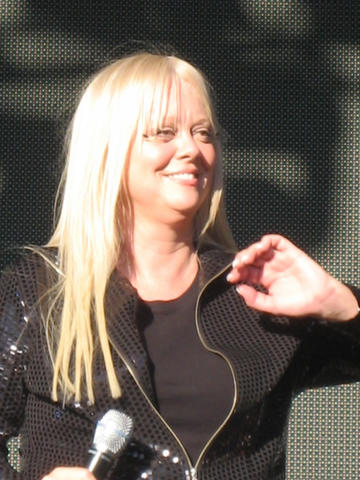
Wilson in 2007

Wilson rejoined the B-52's in 1994. In 1998, she took part in recordings for two new songs to be included with the band's hit singles on the album Time Capsule: Songs for a Future Generation. Wilson then took maternity leave in 1999 (being replaced on tour by Gail Ann Dorsey), later rejoining the band in 2001 for regular touring of their greatest hits.

The B-52's completed the album Funplex in 2007, and it was released in March 2008. Wilson co-wrote every song on the album with the three other band members. In all, she has co-written much of the band's catalog, including "Dance This Mess Around", "Private Idaho" and all of the Cosmic Thing album, including hit singles "Love Shack" and "Roam".

Wilson self-released an EP of new material, Sunrise, in September 2016. February 2017 saw the self-release of another EP of new material, Supernatural. Wilson released her debut solo record, Change, in December 2017 through the independent label Kill Rock Stars. On August 25, 2023, she released her second solo album, Realms. Its first single, "Midnight", was released in May 2023. And in 2025, Wilson released another solo EP, Second Sight.

== Artistry ==
Wilson's vocal efforts include the typical B-52's call-and-response vocals with Schneider and/or Pierson, as well as her harmonies with Pierson on the band's all-female songs such as "Roam", "52 Girls", "Cake", "Legal Tender", "Summer of Love" and "Juliet of the Spirits". One of the band's signature elements is the setup among the three vocalists. However, Wilson sings the greatest number of solo performances in the band, especially on their earlier albums. Examples of Cindy's solo vocal performances in the B-52's include "Hero Worship", "Loveland", "Nip It in the Bud", "Girl from Ipanema Goes to Greenland", "Ain't It a Shame", "She Brakes for Rainbows" and "Give Me Back My Man".

Wilson plays the bongos on live favorites like "Planet Claire", "Mesopotamia", "Pump" and "Party Out of Bounds" as well as other songs such as "6060-842" and "Big Bird". She also has played acoustic guitar in The Cindy Wilson Band, made electric guitar contributions (with her brother Ricky) on the songs "There's a Moon in the Sky (Called the Moon)" from The B-52's, and played the guitar solo for "Nip It In the Bud" during the band's 1982 Mesopotamia tour. She has stated that she was encouraged to play guitar by her brother, but experienced finger pain.

== Collaborations ==
- She sang with the Ramones in the early 1980s on the song "Chop Suey", along with Kate Pierson and Debbie Harry; the title is available as a bonus track on the Ramones' 2002 expanded edition CD re-release of Pleasant Dreams.
- Wilson, Pierson and Keith Strickland were part of the group Melon and recorded two songs ("I Will Call You" and "Honeydew") for a Japanese TV show titled Snakeman Show. The soundtrack LP from 1980 and CD from 1988 was released only in Japan.
- She sang with Martini Ranch, actor Bill Paxton's short-lived band, on several songs ("New Deal", World Without Walls", "Hot Dog") from the 1988 album Holy Cow.
- 1988 was also the year BadBob released his album Now Is Reaction. On several tracks "Bobbie Bennett" was adding her background vocals. Cindy Wilson used that name on this record as a pseudonym.
- She sang with Dreams So Real on the song "Appalachee Shoals", which is only available on the fan club-only released CD Nocturnal Omissions, as well as on the track "Stand Tall" from the 1990 album Gloryline.
- Kristen Hall on her 1992 album Fact & Fiction has Wilson singing vocals on the track "Too Long Running".
- The soundtrack for The Rugrats Movie, released in 1998, contains the track "The World Is Something New to Me" and features Pierson, Schneider, Wilson, and other artists.
- The Family Fantastic, a side project by Yazoo (Yaz)/Erasure mastermind Vince Clarke features a short sample of Wilson saying "Uh, gosh, I'm ready to dance" on the track "Doin' This Thing" from the 2000 album ...Nice!.
- She sang with Kate Pierson on their cover of the McFadden & Whitehead song "Ain't No Stoppin' Us Now", recorded for the soundtrack to the movie The Associate in 1996.
- In 1998, Wilson was involved in recording a children's music album entitled Not Dogs ... Too Simple (A Tale of Two Kitties), which was adapted from a children's book by Mark and Clay Harper.
- Wilson appears with Pierson on the Junior Senior song "Take My Time" (2005) on their album Hey Hey My My Yo Yo. In 2017 she recorded a solo version and plays it in her shows.

== Discography ==
EPs:

- Sunrise (2016)
- Supernatural (2017)
- Second Sight (2025)

Albums:

- Change (2017)
- Realms (2023)

== Filmography ==
- The Rugrats Movie (1998, voice only)
- Athens, GA: Inside Out (1987)
- One Trick Pony (1980)

== Sources ==
- Hale, Grace Elizabeth (2020). Cool Town: How Athens, Georgia, Launched Alternative Music and Changed American Culture. Chapel Hill, North Carolina: UNC Press Books. ISBN 978-1-469-65488-1.
