= The B-52's (album) =

Studio album by the B-52's
- Released: July 6, 1979
- Recorded: March–April 1979
- Studio: Compass Point (Nassau, Bahamas)
- Genres: New wave; post-punk; dance-rock; surf rock; college rock
- Length: 39:14
- Labels: Warner Bros. (US, Canada, Australia); Island (EU, Japan)
- Producer: Chris Blackwell

The B-52's chronology
The B-52's (1979)	Wild Planet (1980)

Singles from The B-52's
- 1. "Rock Lobster"/"52 Girls" Released: 1979; 2. "52 Girls"/"6060-842" Released: 1979 (Netherlands and Germany); 3. "6060-842"/"Hero Worship" Released: 1979 (U.K.); 4. "Planet Claire"/"There's a Moon in the Sky (Called the Moon)" Released: July 6, 1979; 5. "Dance This Mess Around"/"Lava" Released: 1979 (Japan and Colombia)

The B-52's is the debut studio album by American new wave band the B-52's, released on July 6, 1979. The album's kitschy lyrics and mood and hook-laden harmonies helped establish a fanbase for the band, who went on to release several chart-topping singles. The album cover was designed by Tony Wright (credited as "Sue Ab Surd").

The B-52's peaked at number 59 on the Billboard 200, and the single "Rock Lobster" reached number 56 on the Billboard Hot 100. In 2003, the television network VH1 named The B-52's the 99th greatest album of all time. In 2020, The B-52's was ranked number 198 on Rolling Stone magazine's list of the 500 greatest albums of all time.

== Critical reception ==
Original professional ratings
Review scores
Source	Rating
Smash Hits	5/10
Christgau's Record Guide	A

Retrospective professional ratings
Review scores
Source	Rating
AllMusic	5/5 stars
Pitchfork	9.0/10
PopMatters	10/10
Rolling Stone	5/5 stars
The Rolling Stone Album Guide	3.5/5 stars
Select	4/5
Slant Magazine	4/5 stars
Spin Alternative Record Guide	10/10
Stylus Magazine	8.8/10

The B-52's album has received critical acclaim, with music reviewers praising its infectious rhythms and guitar riffs, kitschy lyrics, and party atmosphere. In June 1979, British rock critic Paul Rambali of the New Musical Express wrote: "This is the best debut album of the year. No conditions, no exceptions. As innovative and invigorating as New Boots and Panties or Talking Heads '77, and as wayward yet accessible. That good." Similarly, two weeks later in Record Mirror, British journalist Tim Lott wrote that The B-52's album was the best record he had heard that year. In his "Consumer Guide" column for The Village Voice, music critic Robert Christgau remarked on his fondness "for the pop junk they recycle—with love and panache," while also noting that he was "more delighted with their rhythms, which show off their Georgia roots by adapting the innovations of early funk (a decade late, just like the Stones and Chicago blues) to an endlessly danceable forcebeat format."

In the 1979 Pazz & Jop year-end critics poll, The B-52's album was ranked number 7. New Musical Express ranked it number 12 on their critics' list of the best albums of 1979.

In a retrospective review, Stephen Thomas Erlewine of AllMusic wrote: "Unabashed kitsch mavens at a time when their peers were either vulgar or stylish, the Athens quintet celebrated all the silliest aspects of pre-Beatles pop culture – bad hairdos, sci-fi nightmares, dance crazes, pastels, and anything else that sprung into their minds – to a skewed fusion of pop, surf, avant-garde, amateurish punk, and white funk." Rolling Stone writer Pat Blashill concluded: "On The B-52's, the best little dance band from Athens proved that rock & roll still matters if it's about sex and hair and moving your body. Even if you have to shake-bake shake-bake it like a Shy Tuna." Slant Magazine's Sal Cinquemani stated that "like any over-the-top act, the B-52's wears thin, but the band successfully positioned themselves as pop-culture icons—not unlike the musical antiquities they emulated." MusicHound Rock highlighted the album's "stripped down, surf-twang retro" and called it "the indispensable new wave party record."

In 2003, Rolling Stone ranked The B-52's number 152 on its list of the 500 greatest albums of all time, maintaining the ranking in a 2012 update of the list and dropping it to number 198 in a 2020 update. In 2003, VH1 named it the 99th greatest album of all time. The B-52's was included in the 2005 book 1001 Albums You Must Hear Before You Die. In 2013, it was ranked number 452 on the New Musical Express critics' list of the 500 greatest albums of all time. Slant Magazine included it on their 2003 list of 50 Essential Vital Pop Albums.

In 1995, The B-52's was named number 42 on the top 100 alternative albums list of all time by the Spin Alternative Record Guide. Rolling Stone ranked the album number 28 on its 2013 list of 100 best debut albums of all time, dropping it to number 43 in a 2022 update. In 2023, Paste magazine's staff placed The B-52's at number 86 on their list of the 100 greatest debut albums of all time. PopMatters magazine named it number 40 on its 2024 list of the 50 best post-punk albums ever.

== Influence ==
In January 1980, the B-52's appeared on the TV show Saturday Night Live, where they performed the singles "Rock Lobster" and "Dance This Mess Around". Kurt Cobain and Dave Grohl of Nirvana later mentioned seeing this performance as a memorable moment in their preteen lives. Shortly before his death, John Lennon said that he enjoyed the album.

Stephen Malkmus, frontman of Pavement, recalled in 2018: "There's a time in your life, when you're 13/14, when you buy records just 'cos you're supposed to buy them. I had Get Happy!! by Elvis Costello & the Attractions, Give 'Em Enough Rope by The Clash and this one from the B-52's. Well. I listened to the B-52's a thousand times, Elvis Costello like 20 times, and Give 'Em Enough Rope maybe five times."

== Track listing ==
Side one
No.	Title	Writer(s)	Lead vocals	Length
1.	"Planet Claire"	Fred Schneider; Keith Strickland; Henry Mancini	Schneider; Pierson	4:35
2.	"52 Girls"	Ricky Wilson; Jeremy Ayers	Pierson; C. Wilson	3:34
3.	"Dance This Mess Around"	R. Wilson; Schneider; Strickland; Kate Pierson; Cindy Wilson	C. Wilson; Schneider	4:36
4.	"Rock Lobster"	R. Wilson; Schneider	Schneider; Pierson; C. Wilson	6:49

Side two
No.	Title	Writer(s)	Lead vocals	Length
5.	"Lava"	R. Wilson; Schneider; Strickland; Pierson; C. Wilson	Schneider; Pierson; C. Wilson	4:54
6.	"There's a Moon in the Sky (Called the Moon)"	R. Wilson; Schneider; Strickland; Pierson; C. Wilson	Schneider; Pierson; C. Wilson	4:54
7.	"Hero Worship"	R. Wilson; Robert Waldrop	C. Wilson	4:07
8.	"6060-842"	R. Wilson; Schneider; Strickland; Pierson	Schneider; Pierson	2:48
9.	"Downtown"	Tony Hatch	C. Wilson	2:57
Total length:				39:14

== Personnel ==
The B-52's

- Kate Pierson – vocals, organ, keyboard bass; additional guitar (2, 7)
- Fred Schneider – vocals, cowbell, walkie-talkie, toy piano; keyboard bass (7)
- Keith Strickland – drums, percussion, "Claire sounds"
- Cindy Wilson – vocals, bongos, tambourine; additional guitar (6)
- Ricky Wilson – guitars, smoke alarm

Additional personnel

- Chris Blackwell – producer
- Robert Ash – associate producer, engineer
- George DuBose – photography
- Cass Rigby – assistant engineering
- Sue Ab Surd – art direction
- La Verne – hairdos

== Charts ==
=== Weekly charts ===
Chart (1979-81)	Peak position
Australian Albums (Kent Music Report)	7
Canada Top Albums/CDs (RPM)	14
New Zealand Albums (RMNZ)	3
UK Albums (Official Charts)	22
US Billboard 200	59

Chart (1986)	Peak position
UK Albums (Official Charts)	54

=== Year-end charts ===
Chart (1980)	Peak position
Australian Albums (Kent Music Report)	13
New Zealand Albums (RMNZ)	8

== Certifications ==
Region	Certification	Certified units/sales
Australia (ARIA)	2× Platinum	140,000^{^}
Canada (Music Canada)	Gold	50,000^{^}
New Zealand (RMNZ)	Platinum	15,000^{^}
United States (RIAA)	Platinum	1,000,000^{^}
^{^} Shipments figures based on certification alone.
