= Fred Schneider =

American musician (born 1951)

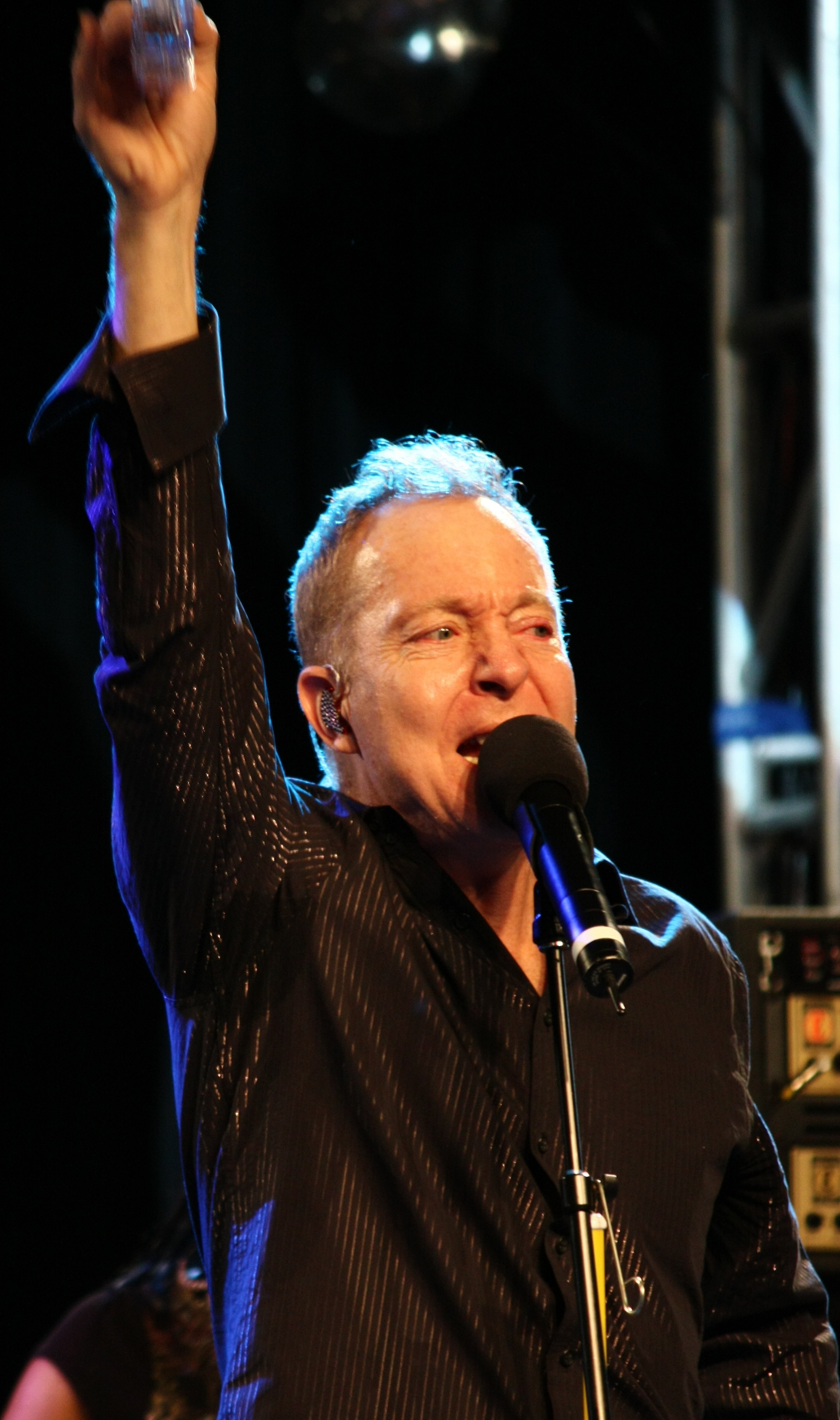
- Schneider performing in 2009

Background information
- Born: Frederick William Schneider III; July 1, 1951 (age 75); Newark, New Jersey, U.S.
- Genres: New wave; post-punk; pop rock; alternative rock
- Occupations: Singer; musician; songwriter; arranger
- Instruments: Vocals; percussion; keyboards
- Years active: 1975–present
- Label: Warner Bros.
- Member of: The B-52s; The Superions
- Website: theb52s.com

Frederick William Schneider III (born July 1, 1951) is an American singer-songwriter and frontman of the rock band the B-52s, of which he is a founding member. Schneider is well known for his sprechgesang, which he developed from reciting poetry over guitars.

== Early life ==
Frederick William Schneider III was born on July 1, 1951, in Newark, New Jersey, and lived in Long Branch, New Jersey, after moving there from Belleville, New Jersey. He has said that his musical influences included "Halloween songs and nutty Christmas songs", along with Motown. After graduating from Shore Regional High School, he attended the University of Georgia, where he wrote a book of poetry for a class project. After college, he was a janitor as well as a Meals on Wheels driver. At the time the B-52s formed, he had very little musical experience.

In the early 1970s, Schneider worked at Ort's Oldies, a record store in Athens, Georgia, run by William "Ort" Carlton.

== The B-52s ==
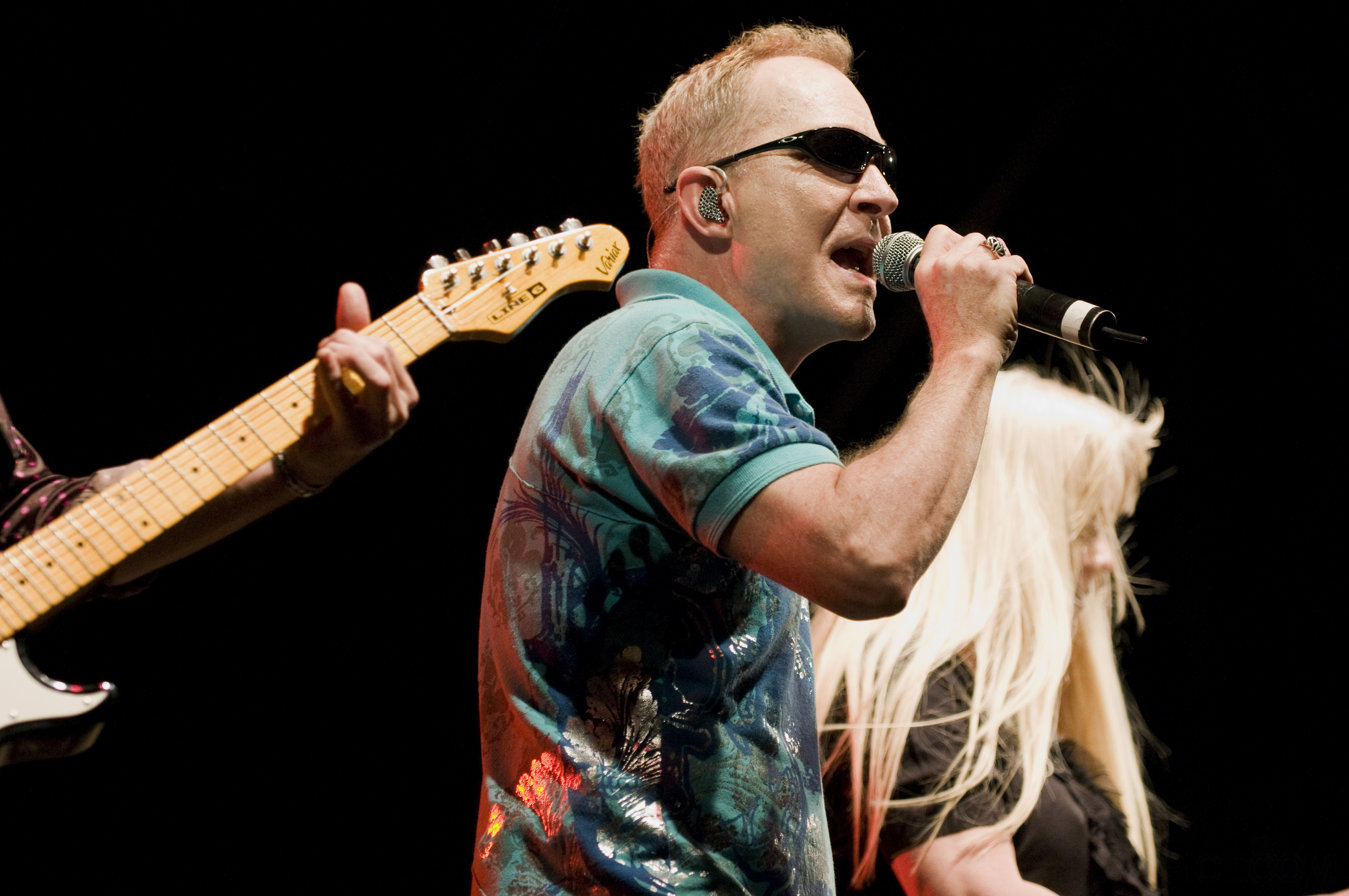
Schneider with The B-52s

The B-52s got their start in 1976 when founders Cindy Wilson, Ricky Wilson, Kate Pierson, Keith Strickland, and Schneider played an impromptu number after drinking at a Chinese restaurant in Athens, Georgia. The band played their first real gig in 1977 at a Valentine's Day party for their friends.

The band's first single was "Rock Lobster", which was recorded by DB Records in 1978. It was an underground success, and sold over 20,000 copies in total. In 1979, the B-52s signed a recording contract with Warner Bros. Records for South America, North America, Australia, and New Zealand. They also signed with Island Records for Europe and Asia. After the death of Ricky Wilson in 1985, the band went on hiatus. They reformed in 1989 and went on to mainstream success.

== Other music ventures ==
Schneider has released two solo albums: Fred Schneider and the Shake Society (1984, reissued in 1991 as Fred Schneider) and Just Fred (1996), the former of which spawned the single and video "Monster", which featured Pierson on backing vocals. He also worked on a side project called the Superions, who released a self-titled EP and the album Destination... Christmas! in 2010. In February 2011, the band announced they were working on a full-length album, which was eventually released in 2017 under the title The Vertical Mind.

== Radio ==
Until late 2008, Schneider hosted a show called Party Out of Bounds that aired on Friday nights, 9pm to 12 am (ET), on Sirius 33 First Wave. On the show, Schneider played a mix of new wave-era dance, remixes and rarities, interspersed with anecdotes and humor.

== Personal life ==
As of July 2012, Schneider was living on Long Island, New York.

On the February 22, 2010, broadcast of The Howard Stern Show, Schneider discussed his experience of coming out as gay to his mother. Schneider said that his mother always knew more about him than he knew about himself, and that he came out of the closet while she was vacuuming. His mother replied, "Oh I know, Freddie", and continued vacuuming. Schneider's reaction was, "It's like, well, OK. I guess I'll go back outside and smoke some pot."

Schneider is a lifelong vegetarian and in 2014 appeared in a PETA ad campaign discouraging people from eating lobsters.

In May 2023, Schneider received an honorary doctorate degree from Five Towns College in Dix Hills, New York, for his contributions to the music industry.

== Discography ==
=== Studio albums with the B-52's ===
- The B-52's (1979)
- Wild Planet (1980)
- Whammy! (1983)
- Bouncing Off the Satellites (1986)
- Cosmic Thing (1989)
- Good Stuff (1992)
- Funplex (2008)

=== Solo studio albums ===
- Fred Schneider and the Shake Society (aka Fred Schneider) (1984/1991)
- Just Fred (1996)

=== Studio albums with the Superions ===
- Destination... Christmas! (2010)
- The Vertical Mind (2017)

=== Collaborations ===
- Schneider is featured on the track "Mr. Used-to-Be", from Richard Barone's 1990 album, Primal Dream. Barone co-wrote and arranged songs on Just Fred and produced Schneider's version of Harry Nilsson's "Coconut" from the Nilsson tribute album For the Love of Harry. Schneider co-wrote and sang on Barone's "Don't Open 'Til Doomsday", from the 2004 album Collection: An Embarrassment of Richard.
- He was a guest vocalist on the song "The Power of Pussy" from Bongwater's 1990 album of the same name.
- He worked with Captain Planet on the "Eco Rap", an updated theme song used for The New Adventures of Captain Planet.
- He co-wrote and sang on "Stinky Dinky" from RuPaul's 1993 debut album Supermodel of the World.
- He appears on the 1994 track "Do the Funky Something" by Godchildren of Soul, found on their Anyone Can Join album and on the Rufus Thomas compilation Do the Funky Somethin.
- The 1994 compilation Elvira Presents Monster Hits features the track "Here Comes the Bride (The Bride of Frankenstein)", sung by Elvira. Schneider co-wrote the song and sang guest vocals.
- Possum Dixon's 1998 album New Sheets features the song "Firecracker", co-written by Schneider.
- The soundtrack for The Rugrats Movie, released in 1998, contains the track "The World is Something New to Me", featuring Schneider, Pierson, and Wilson, along with other artists.
- He was a guest vocalist on the track "National Anthem of Love" from Joe McIntyre's album Meet Joe Mac (2001).
- He provided the vocals for the Foo Fighters' cover of the B-52's' "Planet Claire", released as a B-side of the Foo Fighters single "Times Like These" (2003).
- The compilation album Wig in a Box: Songs From & Inspired by Hedwig and the Angry Inch, released in 2003, features a collaboration between Schneider and Sleater-Kinney, "Angry Inch".
- The 2004 soundtrack album for the film Trekkies 2 features Schneider's collaboration with B-52's part-time keyboardist Pat Irwin, "Beam Me Up".
- He worked with Sophie Ellis-Bextor on some songs for her 2007 album Trip the Light Fantastic. The song "Supersonic", which he co-wrote and provided backing vocals for, appeared as a bonus track on the UK and Australian versions of the album.
- Schneider is featured on the Tiny Masters of Today song "Disco Bomb", from their album Bang Bang Boom Cake (2007).
- Schneider provided guest vocals on Deni Bonet's 2010 single "Girl Party", later released on her 2013 album It's All Good. The album was produced by Richard Barone, an artist with which Schneider and Pierson had previously collaborated.
- Schneider appears on the Ursula 1000 songs "Hey You!" from the album Mondo Beyondo (2011) and "The Neptune Freeze" from the album "Esoterique" (2019). Schneider and Ursula later formed a one-off project called the Fangs, who released a song called "Vampire Vamp" for Halloween 2012.
- Schneider appears on "The Ladies in Drag" and "The Bacon Shake" from the Jinkx Monsoon album The Inevitable Album (2014). He later appeared on "She Evil" from Monsoon's album The Ginger Snapped (2018).
- Elvira released a 7-inch single, "2 Big Pumpkins / 13 Nights of Halloween", in the U.S. for Halloween 2014. Both tracks are co-written by Schneider.
- Schneider sang on Mini Mansions' "Cheap Leather", the B-side of their 2015 single "Vertigo".

== Other works ==
=== Film ===
- One Trick Pony (1980)
- Athens, GA: Inside/Out (1987)
- Funny (1989)
- A Matter of Degrees (1990)
- The Flintstones (1994)
- The Rugrats Movie (1998, voice only)
- Desert Blue (1998, voice only)
- Godass (2000)
- Each Time I Kill (2002)
- Trekkies 2 (2004)

=== Television ===
- He is credited alongside Kate Pierson for singing the theme song to the Nickelodeon cartoon Rocko's Modern Life (1992).
- He is credited for singing the new theme song to the final season of Captain Planet and the Planeteers (1996).
- He was a guest in an episode of Space Ghost Coast to Coast in 1997.
- He appeared in an episode of The L Word in 2006.
- He guest-starred in an episode of Lil' Bush in 2008.
- He appeared in an episode of The Daily Show on June 2, 2008.
- He briefly sang a line in an episode of The Cleveland Show in 2011 (voice only).
- He sang the closing credits song in Bob's Burgers S16 E3 "The Twinnening".

=== Books ===
- In 1975–76, Schneider hand-wrote approximately 100 copies of a short book of his poems entitled Bleb. The book included a poem called "There's a Moon in the Sky (Called the Moon)", which later appeared as a song on the B-52's 1979 debut album.
- In 1987, Schneider wrote a paperback book of mostly poetry entitled Fred Schneider and Other Unrelated Works, which was published by Arbor House, New York. The book is approximately 96 pages and out of print. The book was a compilation of new material and reprinted poems from his independent release Bleb, with illustrations by Kenny Scharf, who also designed the cover art for the B-52's' 1986 album Bouncing Off the Satellites. Approximately 6,000 copies were printed.
