= 40 Watt Club =

Music venue in Athens, Georgia, US

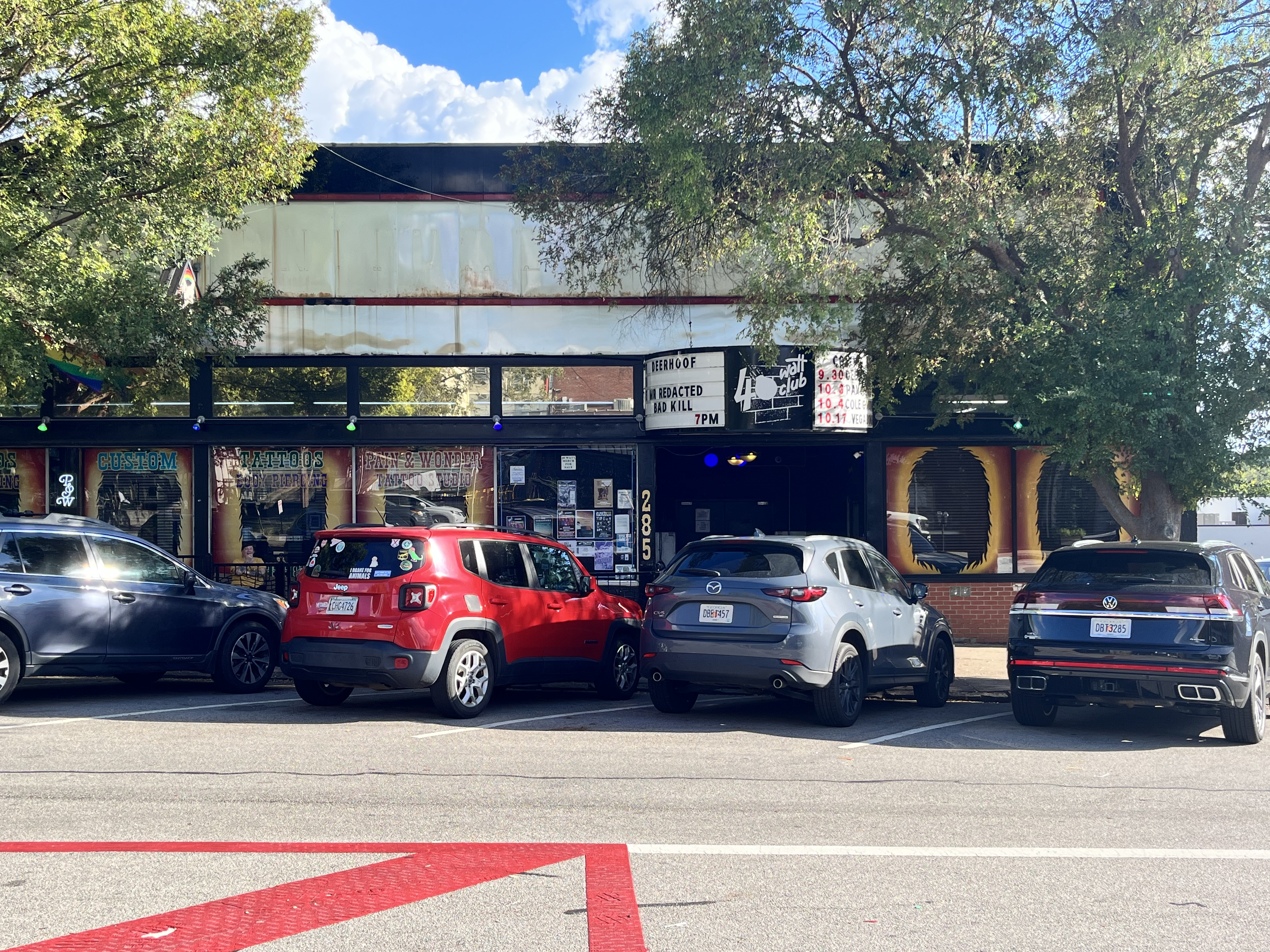
- The 40 Watt Club in 2025
- Interactive map of 40 Watt Club
- Address: 285 West Washington Street
- Location: Athens, Georgia
- Coordinates: 33.9583°N 83.3799°W
- Owner: Barrie Buck

Construction
- Opened: 1979

Website
- www.40watt.com

The 40 Watt Club is a music venue in Athens, Georgia. Along with CBGB, the Whisky a Go Go, and selected others, it was instrumental in launching American punk rock and new wave music.

The 40 Watt Club was the primary performance space for numerous "Athens bands", including Pylon, R.E.M., Love Tractor, Dreams So Real, Guadalcanal Diary, the Primates, Modern Skirts, and others. Its DIY ethos and informality were instrumental in the fostering of punk rock and a "scene" in Athens. In more recent years, the club has been the home-base for such nationally renowned local bands as of Montreal, Reptar, Drive-By Truckers, and the Whigs.

The club's owner since 1987 has been Barrie Buck.

== Background ==
The 40 Watt Club had its origins as Curtis Crowe's 171 College Avenue loft back in 1978. Bill Tabor and Crowe joked that it was a 40 Watt Club due to the single 40-watt bulb which hung from the ceiling. Crowe's first party in his space, on October 31, featured his band Strictly American, a group of friends from Marietta, Georgia, which included members of the future Guadalcanal Diary. Crowe and Tabor would hang out in his loft upstairs and listen to Michael Lachowski and Randy Bewley practice the same riff over and over again in the space directly below. Crowe eventually knocked on their practice space and asked if they could use a drummer and Pylon was born. During Pylon's subsequent tours of the Northeast, Crowe theorized that opening a real club on a shoestring budget was possible. He did so early the following year.

In May 1980, Crowe and his partner Paul Scales moved the "club" a few doors south to a space above a sandwich shop at 100 College Avenue and renamed the club the "40 Watt East". It opened with Crowe still making last-minute additions to the bar and stage. The Side Effects played that first night and Pylon on the second. It was an instant smash with the local youth of Athens. The floors had to be reinforced with removable beams due to the intense dancing that took place.

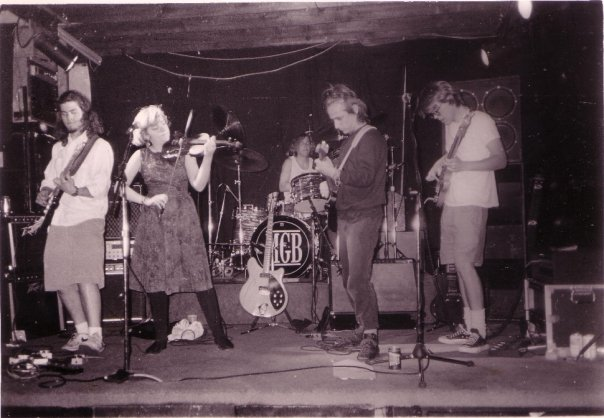
Long Low Rumble at the 40 Watt Club's West Clayton Street location (1988)

In April 1981, with new partner Steve Allen, Scales migrated the club to a larger space at 256 West Clayton Street. Amenities such as a stage and hot water were added, as was a second bathroom. True to the 40 Watt method it was assembled with found materials (including toilet and sink) and volunteer labor. Local artist and musician David Hannon Pierce created the first iteration of the club's famous logo, as well as all the updated variations still in use.

Doug Hoechst bought the club from Allen and Scales and, in 1983, moved it to 382 East Broad Street and renamed it "40 Watt Club Uptown". The 40 Watt Uptown was large and professional, and it was a major stop for underground independent music acts in the 1980s. In 1987, when rents increased on the space, new owners Jared Bailey and Barrie Buck (then-wife of R.E.M. guitarist Peter Buck), moved the club back to its West Clayton Street location.

In early 1990, the Uptown Lounge, which had served as a competitor to the 40 Watt for much of the 1980s, was closed at its original location at 140 E. Washington St. Shortly before closing the Uptown, its owners reopened the Georgia Theater as a music venue, which became the largest venue in town. With the Georgia Theater taking over as the high-capacity venue and with the closure of the smaller Uptown, there was again a market for a small club that would focus on local acts.

In 1991, the 40 Watt moved to its fifth and current location at 285 West Washington Street, the former Potter's House Thrift store building. The club has been home to the annual FLUKE Mini-Comics & Zine Festival since 2011.

== Locations ==
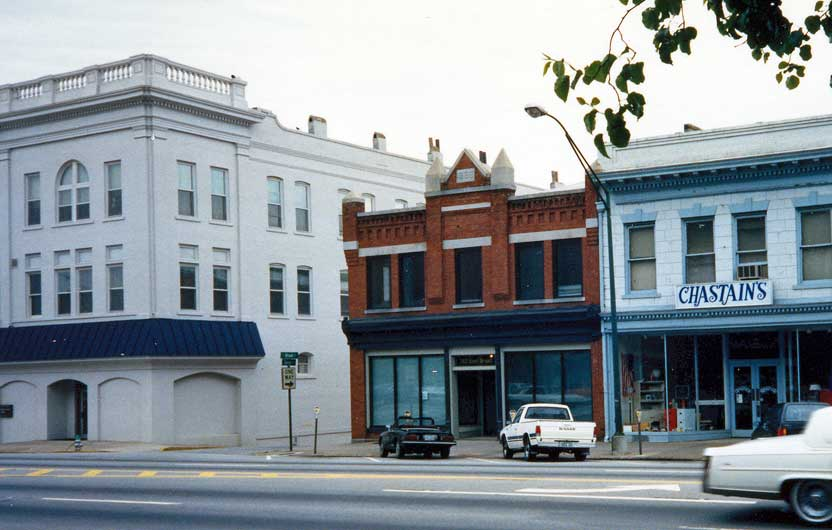
The 40 Watt Club at its location from 1983 to 1987.

- 171 College Avenue (1979–1980)
- 101 College Avenue, also known as "40 Watt East" (1980–1981)
- 256 West Clayton Street (1981–1983 and 1987–1991)
- 382 East Broad Street, also known as "40 Watt Uptown" (1983–1987)
- 285 West Washington Street (1991–present)

== Notable musical performances ==
Well-known acts that have performed there include:

- Belle and Sebastian
- Cat Power
- Built to Spill
- Drive-By Truckers
- Foo Fighters
- Fugazi
- Guided By Voices
- Iggy Pop
- Interpol
- John Mayer
- Jonathan Richman
- Morphine (band)
- My Morning Jacket
- Neutral Milk Hotel
- Nirvana
- Of Montreal
- Patti Smith
- Pavement
- R.E.M.
- Run-DMC
- Salt 'n' Pepa
- Snoop Dogg
- Sonic Youth
- The B-52s
- The Black Crowes
- The Cramps
- The Flaming Lips
- The Killers
- The Melvins
- Wilco
- Ween
- X
- Tegan and Sara

== Legacy ==
VH1 ranked the venue as the second most legendary rock club in the country. Rolling Stone also called the 40 Watt among the best clubs in the U.S. in 2013, with an uncredited columnist writing, "Years before Michael Stipe used to stage-dive into the crowd at this legendary Georgia nightclub, the future R.E.M. frontman would count pennies to get in as doormen stared him down." During his show at the 40 Watt in October 2018, former Smiths guitarist Johnny Marr said, "It's an interesting thing for me, as a British musician, and all those guys as British musicians, to come to this place and play for you guys."
