= Vanessa Briscoe Hay =

American singer and songwriter (born 1955)

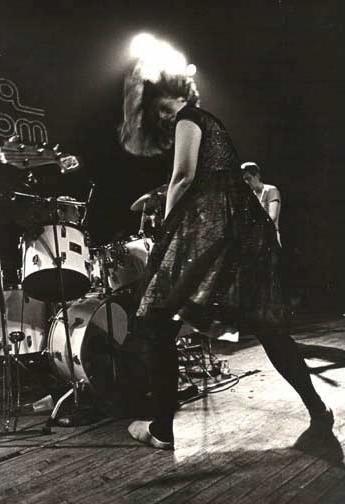
- Hay in 1981

Background information
- Also known as: Vanessa Ellison
- Born: Vanessa Briscoe; October 18, 1955 (age 71)
- Genres: New wave, post-punk, folk rock, experimental, rock
- Occupations: Musician, Songwriter, Producer
- Instruments: Keyboard; Vocals
- Years active: 1979–present
- Labels: Caution; DB Records; Sky Records; DFA; Cloud Recordings; Studio Mouse Productions; PRS for Chunklet Industries; New West Records; Strolling Bones Records

Vanessa Briscoe Hay (born October 18, 1955) is an American singer for the Athens, Georgia bands Pylon, Supercluster and Pylon Reenactment Society.

== Biography ==
Born to a textile worker and a housewife in Atlanta, Georgia, Hay attended elementary and high school in Dacula, Georgia, prior to moving to Athens to attend college. Hay graduated from the University of Georgia art school in 1978. She became the singer for Pylon after being auditioned by Michael Lachowski, Randy Bewley, and Curtis Crowe. A few months later Pylon were the opening band for the British group the Gang of Four in New York City, at the club Hurrah, after being brought to the club's attention by Kate Pierson and Fred Schneider of the B-52's.

Danny Beard from Atlanta helped Pylon to record their first single "Cool/Dub" in 1979 at Stone Mountain Studios in Atlanta, and Pylon began to tour the US. The album Gyrate followed and was released in late 1980. Early career highlights included a performance at Central Park opening for the B-52's, a tour of the UK, opening a few dates for U2 on their first major US tour and the release of the album Chomp.

Pylon decided to quit while they were still having fun. They broke up for the first time in 1983 after playing a "final" show, which was taped for The Athens Show. This was never formally released. In 1986, Hay was filmed for the movie Athens, GA: Inside Out and spoke about her experiences with Pylon. She and Bob Hay were married in 1986. In 1987 they had their first daughter.

In 1989, Pylon reformed. Career highlights the second time around included tours with both R.E.M. and the B-52's, performances at SXSW and CMJ. Hits, a compilation of their early material was reissued by DB Records in 1989. Pylon recorded their third album Chain for the Atlanta label Sky Records in 1991. Pylon broke up a second time in 1992.They played several more shows including the South by Southwest Festival in 1990 and 1991, but when guitarist Bewley decided to leave in 1991, the band broke up again.

Vanessa Hay became an RN in 1994. In 1993, she and Bob Hay had their second daughter.

Randy Bewley approached the other band members about reforming Pylon, just for fun, in 2004. In August, 2004 Pylon played an unannounced show at Little Kings in Athens, Georgia. In 2005, they played a series of dates in Athens and Atlanta, including Athfest and at the Atlanta Heroes awards by the invitation of the B-52's. Jason Gross, Perfect Sound Forever encouraged them to look into reissuing their first album, Gyrate, on CD. Jeff Calder (The Swimming Pool Q's) helped with the process of finding the tapes to restore at Southern Tracks Studios in Atlanta and Rodney Mills remastered them at Rodney Mills Masterhouse in Duluth, Georgia. DFA records in New York approached Pylon about reissuing this material, unaware that Pylon were already working toward this. James Murphy of LCD Soundsystem (band), had been including Pylon's song "Danger" in his DJ sets for several years and was interested in re—issuing Pylon's first album Gyrate on his label DFA. Gyrate Plus was reissued on October 16, 2007. A remastered Chomp More was reissued on October 20, 2009.

Hay was also a member of the recording project Supercluster (band) who recorded and sometimes performed in Athens, Georgia along with Jason NeSmith. Other members of this project included Hannah M. Jones, Kay Stanton, Bob Hay, Bill David, John Fernandes, Heather McIntosh, Bryan Poole and Randy Bewley (deceased). Waves, their full-length project, was released on October 6, 2009.

A 7-inch vinyl single "Gravity / Altitude" by Pylon was issued in April 2016 by Chunklet as a part of the Pylon Live project. A double vinyl album was issued on July 25, 2016. This music was recorded at the first final performance on December 1, 1983 at the Mad Hatter in Athens, GA. Vanessa performed with Pylon Reenactment Society at both release events along with Swimming Pool Q's and members of Love Tractor.

Since 2014, Hay has fronted the Pylon Reenactment Society, a Pylon tribute act who have featured members from more recent Athens bands like Supercluster (band), the Glands and Casper & the Cookies. In a 2016 Portland Mercury interview, Hay said, "It's been inspirational, if that's the right word, to be able to play this music again. I really don't want people to forget Pylon. These are different people and we are re-enacting this experience, so it's not exactly Pylon, but it's fresh and done in the same spirit". In October 2017, Pylon Reenactment Society self-released an EP initially recorded on December 11, 2016, for broadcast in Los Angeles, California, for DJ Michael Stock's KXLU show "Part Time Punks," called "Part Time Punks Session." In March 2018, Hay was named one of the “25 Best Frontwomen of All Time” by Paste Magazine

On February 9, 2024, Pylon Reenactment Society released their full-length album debut on Strolling Bones Records titled Magnet Factory. The album of eleven songs includes two tunes written by Pylon in 1979, but never formally recorded in the studio – “3 x 3” and “Heaven (In Your Eyes)” alongside nine original songs. One of the new tracks (“Fix It”) features vocals by Kate Pierson. The graphics for the package were designed by Michael Lachowski, original bassist for Pylon.

== Personal life ==
- Hay's first husband was Jimmy Ellison, bassist for Athens, GA band Side Effects.
- Hay’s second and current husband (since 1986) is Athens, GA musician Bob Hay. They are parents of two daughters.

== Discography ==
=== Pylon (band) ===
- Cool/Dub 7-inch single (Caution Records 1980)
- Gyrate LP (DB Records, Armageddon 1980)
- Pylon !! EP (DB Records, Armageddon 1980)
- Crazy/M-Train 7-inch single (DB Records 1982)
- Beep/Altitude 7-inch single (DB Records 1982)
- Four Minutes/Beep/Altitude EP (DB Records 1982)
- Chomp LP (DB Records 1983)
- Hits LP/CD (DB Records 1988)
- Chain LP/CD (Sky Records 1990)
- Gyrate Plus CD (DFA Records, 2007)
- Chomp More CD (DFA Records, October 20, 2009)
- Gravity/Weather Radio 7-inch single (Chunklet, 2016)
- Pylon Live Double LP (Chunklet, 2016)
- Pylon Box Boxset (New West Records, 2020)

=== Supercluster (band) ===
- Special 5 EP (self-issued, 2008)
- Waves CD (Cloud Recordings/Studio Mouse Productions) (October 6, 2009)
- I Got The Answer/Sunflower Clock 7-inch single (Cloud Recordings/Studio Mouse Productions) (October 6, 2009)
- Paris Effect/Neat in the Street 7-inch single (Cloud Recordings/Studio Mouse Productions) (March 29, 2011)
- Things We Used To Drink/Memory Of The Future 7-inch single (Studio Mouse Productions) (July 10, 2012)

=== Pylon Reenactment Society ===
- Part Time Punks Session Vinyl 6 song 12-inch EP (PRS, Chunklet Industries, October 20, 2017) PRS001
- Messenger / Cliff Notes Vinyl 2 song 7” single (PRS, Chunklet Industries, November 30, 2019) PRS002
- Compression digital single (Self Released, October 31, 2020) SB27
- 3 x 3 digital single (Strolling Bones Records, September 29, 2023) SB27
- Flowers Everywhere digital single (Strolling Bones Records, October 27, 2023) SB27
- Christmas Daze digital single (Strolling Bones Records, December 1, 2023) SB29
- ‘’Fix It (feat. Kate Pierson)’’ digital single (Strolling Bones Records, January 19, 2024) SB27
- Heaven (In Your Eyes) digital single (Strolling Bones Records, February 9, 2024) SB27
- Magnet Factory Vinyl LP, CD (Strolling Bones Records, February 9, 2024) SB27

=== Compilations ===
==== With Pylon (band) ====
- Declaration of Independents - 13 Tracks of U.S. Rock 1980, Vinyl LP, Various artists (1980, Ambition Records AMB1, Basement Records BASE 6005, Stiff Records Yank 2)
- Jericho Go, Vinyl LP, Various artists (1985, DB Recs / Stiff Records D BAT80) (DB Recs / Victor Musical Industries, Inc. VIL 28034)
- Athens, GA - Inside / Out, Vinyl LP, Various artists (1987, I.R.S. Records IRS6185)
- Hits, Cassette, CD (1989, DB Recs DB91)
- Squares Blot Out the Sun, Vinyl LP, CD, Cassette, Various artists (1990, DB Recs DB72)
- Totally Wired, CD, Various artists (1995, Razor & Tie RE 2076)
- KFJC 98.7 Fifty - Blowing Minds Since 1959, Vinyl double record LP, Various artists (2009, No label KJFC24)
- Keith Haring - The World of Keith Haring - Influences + Connections , Vinyl triple record LP boxset, Triple CD boxset, Various artists (2019, Soul Jazz, Ltd. SJR LP444)
- Blank Generation- A Story of US and Canadian Punk and It's Aftershocks 1975-1981, Five CD boxset, Various artists (2023, Cherry Red Records, (CRCDBOX147)

==== With Pylon Reenactment Society ====
- Let's Go Dancing: Said the Firefly to the Hurricane (A Kevn Kinney Tribute), Vinyl LP, digital, Various artists (November 24, 2023, Tasty Goody Records, (MCC1950)

==== With other artists ====
- Finest Worksongs:Athens Bands play the music of R.E.M. CD (2007, Iron Horse IHR002) (guest vocalist-The Observatory-"Pilgrimage")

=== Other ===
- Dead Letter Office (LP) LP (IRS Records 1985) (Cover of "Crazy" by R.E.M.)
- We Made A Record, What Did You Do?/Wuxtry Record Store Day Compilation (LP) LP (Wuxtry Records 2010) (Paris Effect by Supercluster)
- Cover + Remix 7-inch single (DFA Records, October 2011) (Cover of "Cool" by Deerhunter, Remix of Yo-Yo by Calvinist)
- Tunabunny - "Form A Line RSD" 12-inch ep (HHBTM Records, April 2013) ("Form A Line" by Tunabunny, Form A Line: Vanessa Vocal Version, Back It Up Dub Version, Album Version, Line Dance Version)
- Casper & the Cookies - "Modern Silence" album (HHBTM Records, 2013) (contributed vocals on “I am Gone” by Casper & the Cookies
- Dressy Bessy - "Lady Liberty" album (Yep Rock Records, February 2016) (Backing vocals on "Get Along (Diamond Ring)” by Dressy Bessy
- Peter Buck and Friends - "Revolutions Per Movie" 7-inch flexidisc giveaway to Patreon subscribers (Revolutions Per Movie, 2024) (Vocals on "Shape Of Things To Come” performed by Peter Buck and Friends
- Maximo Park - "Stream of Life" album (Lower Third Records, September 27, 2024) (Featured vocals on "Dormant ‘Til Explosion” by Maximo Park

== Filmography ==
- Athens, GA.: Inside/Out (1987), archive footage, interview
- Motherhood (2009), songtrack song "Stop It," Pylon mentioned as The Pylons by Eliza Uma Thurman, the main character who also dances with a bicycle messenger to this song.
- Red Turns Into Blue: Athens Inside-Out 2 (2021), performance footage with Pylon Reenactment Society, interview

== Video ==
- Beep (1990), Pylon (band), from CD: Hits, a compilation, DB Records.Reissued CD: Chomp More by DFA Records (2009). Directed and edited by Michael Lachowski
- Look Alive (1992), Pylon (band), from album Chain, Sky Records. Directed by Jim McKay / C-100.
- Too Many Eights (2007), Supercluster (band), from CDR EP: Special 5. Directed and edited by Vanessa Briscoe Hay
- I Got the Answer (2009), Supercluster (band), from: CD Waves, Studio Mouse Productions/Cloud Recordings. Directed by Paul Thomas and John Lee Matney.
- Neat In The Street (2011), Supercluster (band), from: single "Paris Effect"/"Neat In The Street", Studio Mouse Productions/Cloud Recordings. Written by The Side Effects (Butchart/Ellison/Swartz), 1980. Directed and edited by Hana Hay.
- Memory Of The Future (2012), Supercluster (band), from: single “Things We Used To Drink”/“Memory Of The Future”, Studio Mouse Productions. Directed by Hana Hay and Hannah Jones from artwork by Hannah Jones.
- Beep (2017), Pylon Reenactment Society, from Vinyl 12” Ep Part Time Punks Sessiom, PRS for Chunklet Industries, from unreleased documentary “Athens, GA...30 Years On” directed by Bill Cody, edited by Tony Brazier.
- Messenger (2019), Pylon Reenactment Society, from Vinyl 7” Single Messenger / Cliff Notes, PRS for Chunklet Industries, directed by Tony Brazier.
- 3 x 3 (2023), Pylon Reenactment Society, from: digital single, Strolling Bones Records. Written by Pylon (band)° (Bewley, Briscoe Hay, Crowe, Lachowski), 1979. directed by Bill Cody, edited by Tony Brazier.
- Flowers Everywhere (2023), Pylon Reenactment Society, from: digital single, Strolling Bones Records. Written by Pylon Reenactment Society° (Briscoe Hay, Denton, NeSmith, Rowe, Sanders, Stanton), 2023. directed by Dan Aguar.
- Fix It (feat. Kate Pierson) (2024), Pylon Reenactment Society from: digital single, Strolling Bones Records. Written by Pylon Reenactment Society directed by Dominic DeJoseph
- Heaven (In Your Eyes) (2024), Pylon Reenactment Society from: digital single, Strolling Bones Records. Written by Pylon Reenactment Society directed by Matthew Buzzell

== Sources ==
- Reynolds, Simon: Rip It Up and Start Again: Postpunk 1978-1984, Penguin Books, February 2006, p. 264.
- Strong, Martin C. (2003). The Great Indie Discography. Edinburgh: Canongate. p. 469. OL 22546927M.
- Christgau, Robert: Christgau's Consumer Guide-the 80's, Pantheon Books, 1990, pp. 329, 498, 506.
- Hale, Grace Elizabeth: “Cool Town How Athens, Georgia, Launched Alternative Music and Changed American Culture”, A Ferris and Ferris Book, February 13, 2020
