= Pylon Box =

Compilation album box set by Pylon
- Released: November 6, 2020
- Length: 160:18
- Language: English
- Label: New West

Pylon chronology
Pylon Live (2016)	Pylon Box (2020)

“The Pylon Box is such a thorough look at the band. There’s an amazing amount of photographs, a wonderful history of the band and the graphic design is really satisfying. It’s been a lot of work for quite a few people. It’s really fun and a little over-the-top.”

— Pylon bassist Michael Lachowski on his satisfaction with Pylon Box

Pylon Box is a 2020 box set compilation album of American alternative rock band Pylon, featuring their first two albums — 1980’s Gyrate and Chomp were remastered from the original tapes as well as over a dozen newly released tracks. It has received positive reviews from critics.

== Reception ==
According to the review aggregator Metacritic, Pylon Box received "universal acclaim" based on a weighted average score of 92 out of 100 from 7 critic scores. Editors at AllMusic rated this album 5 out of 5 stars, with critic Mark Deming writing that "Pylon's music [is] challenging but also welcoming, and fun to dance to" and this compilation "is a glorious celebration of the group's original 1978 to 1983 run" and while he bemoans that 1990's Chain is not featured on this set, "Pylon Box is an otherwise near-flawless summation of a great and unique band, and it's absolutely worth every penny of its purchase price". In Glide Magazine, John Moore praised both the band's unique blend of musical influences and the care that New West Records displayed in making the assembling this packaging. Editors at Pitchfork scored this release 8.5 out of 10 and critic Marc Masters praised the band's musicianship across the years of recordings on this box set, also noting the influence the band had on subsequent musicians. Jon Dolan of Rolling Stone gave Pylon Box 4.5 out of 5 stars and ended his review, "From the very first moment they started playing, this was a band that was eons ahead of its time. Pylon Box is exactly the deep dive their incredible legacy deserves." Jason Anderson of Uncut rated this compilation 4.5 out of 5 stars and wrote that Pylon's "insistently rhythmic, continually surprising post-punk racket... can sound as thrilling as it surely did 40 years ago".

== Track listing ==
All songs written by Randall Bewley, Curtis Crowe, Vanessa Briscoe Hay and Michael Lachowski.

Gyrate (1980)

1. "Volume" – 4:13
2. "Feast On My Heart" – 3:35
3. "Precaution" – 2:48
4. "Weather Radio" – 2:16
5. "The Human Body" – 3:11
6. "Read a Book" – 2:02
7. "Driving School" – 3:53
8. "Gravity" – 2:37
9. "Danger" – 5:38
10. "Working Is No Problem" – 3:29
11. "Stop It" – 3:06

Chomp (1983)

12. "K" – 4:14
13. "Yo-Yo" – 3:23
14. "Beep" – 2:01
15. "Italian Movie Theme" – 3:13
16. "Crazy" – 3:48
17. "M-Train" – 2:58
18. "Buzz" – 2:57
19. "No Clocks" – 3:56
20. "Reptiles" – 3:58
21. "Spider" – 4:06
22. "Gyrate" – 3:19
23. "Altitude" – 3:19

Razz Tape (previously unreleased)

24. "The Human Body" – 3:08
25. "Modern Day Fashion Woman" (Version 1) – 3:03
26. "Read a Book" (Instrumental) – 1:48
27. "Working Is No Problem" – 3:11
28. "Precaution" – 2:10
29. "Cool" – 3:02
30. "Functionality" – 4:31
31. "Efficiency" – 2:20
32. "Information" – 2:43
33. "Dub" – 4:41
34. "Modern Day Fashion Woman" (Version 2) – 3:51
35. "Danger" – 4:47
36. "Feast On My Heart" (Working Version) – 4:17

Extra unreleased tracks

37. "Untitled" – 2:21
38. "Cool" – 3:19
39. "Dub" – 4:42
40. "Recent Title" – 2:27
41. "Danger!!" (Danger Remix) – 5:37
42. "Crazy" (Single Mix) – 3:14
43. "Reptiles" (Channel One Version) – 3:32
44. "No Clocks" (Channel One Version) – 2:50
45. "Spider" (Alternate Mix) – 3:49
46. "3 X 3" (Live) – 2:19
47. "Danger III" (Live) – 4:30

== Personnel ==
Pylon

- Randall Bewley – guitar, co-production, design
- Curtis Crowe – drums, co-production
- Vanessa Briscoe Hay – vocals, co-production, graphics
- Michael Lachowski – bass guitar, co-production, creative direction, graphics, photography

Additional personnel

- Terry Allen – photography
- Bruce Baxter – recording, audio engineering, production (Gyrate tracks)
- Bill Berry – liner notes
- Carrie Brownstein – liner notes
- Sean Bourne – art direction, design
- Paul Butchart – recording
- Stephen Deusner – liner notes
- Kevin Dunn – production (Gyrate tracks)
- Mitch Easter – recording, audio engineering
- Gene Holder – production (Chomp tracks)
- Jon King – liner notes
- Jason Nesmith – restoration, audio mastering, co-production
- Henry Owings – co-production, creative direction, graphics
- Chris Rasmussen – recording
- Paul Scales – photography
- Lowell T. Seaich – photography
- Chris Stamey – production (Chomp tracks)
- Michael Stipe – liner notes
- Jason Thrasher – photography

== See also ==
- 2020 in American music
- 2020 in rock music
- List of 2020 albums
