= Michael Lachowski =

American musician

- Born: Michael Scott Lachowski; Norfolk, Virginia, U.S.
- Genres: New wave, post-punk
- Occupations: Musician, Songwriter, Graphical designer
- Instrument: Bass guitar
- Years active: 1978–present

Michael Scott Lachowski is a musician best known as the bass guitar player for Pylon, a band from Athens, Georgia. He was born in Norfolk, Virginia, and attended the University of Georgia art school. He and his roommate Randy Bewley formed Pylon, recruiting Curtis Crowe as a drummer, and Vanessa Briscoe Hay, a fellow student at the University of Georgia. They recorded the single "Cool/Dub", an album Gyrate, an EP, another album Chomp, and two singles. Pylon toured the United States, Canada and the United Kingdom before breaking up in 1983. They returned to tour again in 1988, and recorded another album, Chain, in 1990, before breaking up again in 1991. Pylon reformed in 2005 and occasionally performed until 2009, when Bewley died. Their first album, Gyrate Plus, was reissued on October 16, 2007, by DFA Records, New York City. In 2009, Chomp More was also reissued by DFA Records.

Lachowski has had a graphic design firm in Athens called Candy and a magazine called Young, Foxy and Free. He also works on occasion as a disc jockey and has been involved as a participant in the Bicycle Ride Across Georgia for years. He has worked in public relations at the Georgia Museum of Art since 2012.

During his time in Athens, Lachowski ran an answerphone service known as the Athens Party Telephone. Its acronym, A.P.T., was used in the R.E.M. song "Stumble", which appeared on the band's first American release, 1982's Chronic Town EP.

== Discography ==
Pylon

- Cool/Dub 7" single (Caution Records 1979)
- Gyrate LP (DB Records, Armageddon 1980)
- Pylon !! EP (DB Records, Armageddon 1980)
- Crazy/M-Train 7" single (DB Records 1981)
- Beep/Altitude 7" single (DB Records 1982)
- Four Minutes/Beep/Altitude EP (Db recs 1982)
- Chomp LP (DB Records 1983)
- Hits CD/cassette (DB Records 1988)
- Chain LP/CD (Sky Records 1990)
- Gyrate Plus CD (DFA Records 2007)
- Chomp More CD (DFA Records 2009)
- Gravity/Weather Radio 7" single (Chunklet 2016)
- Pylon Live Double LP (Chunklet 2016)
- Pylon Box (2020)

=== Compilations ===
==== With Pylon (band) ====
- Declaration of Independents - 13 Tracks of U.S. Rock 1980, Vinyl LP, Various artists (1980, Ambition Records AMB1, Basement Records BASE 6005, Stiff Records Yank 2)
- Jericho Go, Vinyl LP, Various artists (1985, DB Recs / Stiff Records D BAT80) (DB Recs / Victor Musical Industries, Inc. VIL 28034)
- Athens, GA - Inside / Out, Vinyl LP, Various artists (1987, I.R.S. Records IRS6185)
- Hits, Cassette, CD (1989, DB Recs DB91)
- Squares Blot Out the Sun, Vinyl LP, CD, Cassette, Various artists (1990, DB Recs DB72)
- Totally Wired, CD, Various artists (1995, Razor & Tie RE 2076)
- KFJC 98.7 Fifty - Blowing Minds Since 1959, Vinyl double record LP, Various artists (2009, No label KJFC24)
- Keith Haring - The World of Keith Haring - Influences + Connections , Vinyl triple record LP boxset, Triple CD boxset, Various artists (2019, Soul Jazz, Ltd. SJR LP444)
- Blank Generation- A Story of US and Canadian Punk and It's Aftershocks 1975-1981, Five CD boxset, Various artists (2023, Cherry Red Records, (CRCDBOX147)

Other

- Dead Letter Office (LP) LP (IRS Records 1985) (Cover of "Crazy" by R.E.M.)
- Cover + Remix 7" single (DFA Records, October 2011) (Cover of "Cool" by Deerhunter, Remix of Yo-Yo by Calvinist)
- Magnet Factory by Pylon Reenactment Society (Strolling Bones Records, 2024, songwriting, graphics)

== Filmography ==
- Athens, GA.: Inside/Out (1987), archive footage, interview

== Video ==
- Beep (1990), Pylon, from CD: Hits, a compilation, DB Records
- Look Alive (1992), Pylon, from album :Chain, Sky Records
