= Randall Bewley =

American guitarist (1955–2009)

- Also known as: Randy Bewley
- Born: Randall Bewley; July 25, 1955; Bradenton, Florida, US
- Died: February 25, 2009 (aged 53) Athens, Georgia, US
- Genres: New wave; post-punk
- Occupations: Musician; songwriter
- Instruments: Guitar; bass; drums
- Years active: 1978–2009
- Labels: Caution; DB; Sky; DFA
- Formerly of: Pylon; Supercluster; Soundhouses

Randall Eugene Bewley (July 25, 1955 – February 25, 2009) was the guitarist for the Athens, Georgia-based band Pylon.

== Life and career ==
Bewley was born in Bradenton, Florida. He lived in Sarasota, Florida, Washington, D.C., and near Atlanta, Georgia, while growing up. Bewley attended the University of Georgia's Lamar Dodd School of Art where he met Michael Lachowski, a fellow art student. They became roommates and decided to form a band. He and Lachowski, along with fellow art students Vanessa Briscoe Hay and Curtis Crowe, formed Pylon, having their first performance in 1979. On their first trip to New York City, they were reviewed in Interview Magazine.

Bewley was a very influential guitarist and used the guitar to create not just notes, but interesting sounds as well. Pylon recorded three albums, three singles and one EP. The band has opened for U2, R.E.M., the B-52's, Talking Heads and Gang of Four. Pylon broke up twice, but they reunited and had been playing occasional shows. Pylon's first album Gyrate was reissued in October 2007 by DFA records. Chomp was reissued in 2009.

Bewley was an art teacher for a while, but towards the end of his life, he devoted more time to his music and his own art. He also played with two other Athens projects: Sound Houses (formerly The New Sound of Numbers) and Supercluster.

== Death ==
On February 23, 2009, Bewley was driving on Barber Street in Athens when he suffered a heart attack. According to a statement by his band Pylon, his van drifted off the road and overturned. He was admitted to Athens Regional Medical Center and lapsed into a coma; he died two days later on February 25 when he was removed from life support. He was 53.

== Discography ==
Pylon

- Cool/Dub 7" single (Caution Records 1979)
- Gyrate LP (DB Records, Armageddon 1980)
- Pylon !! 10" EP (DB Records, Armageddon 1980)
- Crazy/M-Train 7" single (DB Records 1981)
- Beep/Altitude 7" single (DB Records 1982)
- Four Minutes/Beep/Altitude EP (DB Records 1982)
- Chomp LP (DB Records 1983)
- Hits LP/CD (DB Records 1988)
- Chain LP/CD (Sky Records 1990)
- Gyrate Plus CD (DFA Records 2007)
- Chomp MoreCD (DFA Records 2009)
- Gravity/Weather Radio 7" single (Chunklet 2016)
- Pylon Live Double LP (Chunklet 2016)
- Pylon Box (2020)

=== Compilations ===
==== With Pylon (band) ====
- Declaration of Independents - 13 Tracks of U.S. Rock 1980, Vinyl LP, Various artists (1980, Ambition Records AMB1, Basement Records BASE 6005, Stiff Records Yank 2)
- Jericho Go, Vinyl LP, Various artists (1985, DB Recs / Stiff Records D BAT80) (DB Recs / Victor Musical Industries, Inc. VIL 28034)
- Athens, GA - Inside / Out, Vinyl LP, Various artists (1987, I.R.S. Records IRS6185)
- Hits, Cassette, CD (1989, DB Recs DB91)
- Squares Blot Out the Sun, Vinyl LP, CD, Cassette, Various artists (1990, DB Recs DB72)
- Totally Wired, CD, Various artists (1995, Razor & Tie RE 2076)
- KFJC 98.7 Fifty - Blowing Minds Since 1959, Vinyl double record LP, Various artists (2009, No label KJFC24)
- Keith Haring - The World of Keith Haring - Influences + Connections , Vinyl triple record LP boxset, Triple CD boxset, Various artists (2019, Soul Jazz, Ltd. SJR LP444)
- Blank Generation- A Story of US and Canadian Punk and It's Aftershocks 1975-1981, Five CD boxset, Various artists (2023, Cherry Red Records, (CRCDBOX147)

Supercluster

- Special 5 EP CD-R (self-issued, 2008)
- Waves CD CD (Studio Mouse Productions for Cloud Recordings, 2009)
- I Got the Answer/Sunflower Clock 7" single (Cloud Recordings 2009)

Other

- Dead Letter Office (LP) LP (IRS Records 1985) (Cover of "Crazy" by R.E.M.)
- Cover + Remix 7" single (DFA Records, October 2011) (Cover of "Cool" by Deerhunter, Remix of Yo-Yo by Calvinist)

== Video ==
- Beep (1990), Pylon, from CD: Hits, a compilation, DB Records
- Look Alive (1992), Pylon, from album :Chain, Sky Records

== Filmography ==
- Athens, GA.: Inside/Out (1987), archive footage
