= The Hot Place =

American rock band

- Origin: Atlanta, Georgia, U.S.
- Genres: dark psychedelic, alternative rock, post-punk
- Instruments: Joe Maphis Mosrite Bass, played by Lisa King
- Years active: 2011-present
- Label: No Big Wheel Records
- Members: Lisa King, Jeff Calder, Mike Lynn, Robert Schmid
- Website: http://www.thehotplaceband.com/

The Hot Place is an American rock band formed in Atlanta, Georgia in 2011. They have released one full-length album, The Language of Birds on No Big Wheel Records, which was recorded at Southern Tracks Recording. They have released 2 Singles/EP's, Petals of Ruin and A Second to Live.

== History ==
The band was formed in 2011 by Lisa King (vocals, bass) and Jeff Calder (lead guitar). Jeff Calder is a founding member of the notable American new-wave band The Swimming Pool Q's. Lisa King previously played with 1990's Alt-Rock band Unminded, (guitar, vocals), and in the 2000s she played with celebrated Atlanta bands The Swimming Pool Q's (keyboards, percussion) and The Glenn Phillips Band (keyboards), featuring influential guitar soloist and composer Glenn Phillips. Mike Lynn, founding member of 1990's Atlanta college-rock band Betty's Not A Vitamin, joined the lineup in 2012 on rhythm guitar. Robert Schmid, the former drummer and current bassist for The Swimming Pool Q's rounded out the lineup on drums in 2013. Richard Lloyd of Television and David J Haskins of Bauhaus/Love and Rockets have been guest musicians on recent recordings by The Hot Place.

The Hot Place recorded their first album, The Language of Birds at Southern Tracks Recording, the now-retired historic Atlanta analog studio, whose prominent clients included Bruce Springsteen, Matthew Sweet, Stone Temple Pilots, and Bob Dylan. The record was produced by Jeff Calder of The Swimming Pool Q's. Guest guitarist Richard Lloyd, founding member of the 1970s proto-punk band Television, played the guitar solo on two tracks from the album, Saturn Moved and Petals of Ruin (reprise). The album was released digitally in 2014 and on 180-gram orange vinyl in 2015 on the independent Atlanta label, No Big Wheel Records, after a successful Kickstarter campaign.

The band's first single, Petals of Ruin was released digitally in 2013 in conjunction with World Goth Day, which is an annual yearly celebration every May 22, promoting tolerance of alternative subcultures. The band released a digital EP and video, featuring the single A Second to Live in 2013 on Halloween, also in conjunction with World Goth Day. Lisa King collaborated with DJ Gori in 2014, and released a digital EP and video covering Joy Division's Love Will Tear Us Apart as the industrial musical duo, The Von Vons. The single and video, on No Big Wheel Records, were promoted by DJ Cruel Britannia and Martin Oldgoth, the founders of World Goth Day, and all proceeds from the download went to support The Sophie Lancaster Foundation (S.O.P.H.I.E.).

The Hot Place made its live debut at The International Pop Overthrow festival in Atlanta, on September 12, 2014. Following this performance, the band played an album release event at Little Tree Studios on November 15, 2014, performing with Atlanta and Athens musician Kevin Dunn.

The band is currently working on a second album, with producer Jeff Calder and engineer Tim Delaney at Electron Gardens Studio in Atlanta, Georgia, in January 2017. The Hot Place hosted and opened a series of live living room shows, collaborating with David J Haskins, (founding member and bassist of British goth/post-punk bands Bauhaus & Love and Rockets) in February, June, and September 2016. The intimate shows were performed at Electron Gardens studio in Atlanta, and ATHICA: Athens Institute for Contemporary Art and The World Famous in Athens, Georgia. In June 2017, The Hot Place toured with David J to support his double LP release, Vagabond Songs. One stop of the tour was a Chapel in Historic Bonaventure Cemetery in Savannah, Ga. Lisa King, frontwoman of The Hot Place was interviewed by Savannah newspaper, Do Savannah, about her long association with David J. David J played harmonica at Electron Gardens Studio, while touring with The Hot Place, on a track entitled, Hell, Highwater, or Sunlight to be released in 2018.

The Hot Place's singer and bassist Lisa King has also conducted a series of surrealist, word association recorded interviews with David J, and other notable post-punk and new-wave musicians Johnny Marr, Marty Willson-Piper of The Church, Daniel Lanois, and Nikki Sudden, for online magazine, The Madcap Speaks. Her most recent interview was a public word-association performance with David J at Criminal Records, Atlanta on June 8, 2017.

== Musical style ==
The Hot Place has been described as post-punk with a slight dark psychedelic sound, influenced by 1960's bands such as Pink Floyd, The Doors, and The Byrds, and by 1980's bands The Church, Love and Rockets, The Cure, and Siouxsie and the Banshees. In 2014 Georgia Music Magazine described the band's music as “...reflective pop-rock, dreamy and seductive with dashes of measured volatility.” In Stomp & Stammer's 2014 18th Anniversary Edition, Jeff Clark explains that “The mood throughout The Language of Birds is largely wistful, the songwriting is top-notch and the sound, production, and musicianship are pristine, which is no surprise considering the veteran players enlisted.”

== Discography ==
=== Albums ===
The Language of Birds, (2015), No Big Wheel Records, [NBW007]

=== Singles, EPs ===
Petals of Ruin, (2013), No Big Wheel Records

A Second to Live, (2013), No Big Wheel Records

Love Will Tear Us Apart, with The Von Vons, (2014) No Big Wheel Records
