= Curtis Crowe =

American drummer

- Origin: Marietta, Georgia, US
- Genre: Rock
- Occupation: Drummer
- Instrument: Drums
- Years active: 1979-present
- Formerly of: Pylon

Curtis Hudgins Crowe is the drummer for the Athens, Georgia, rock band Pylon. He is a native of Marietta, Georgia, and is the middle child of five children. Crowe moved to Athens to attend the University of Georgia art school. His sister Rhett Crowe was later the bass player for the band Guadalcanal Diary, a fixture on the college music scene back in the 1980s and 1990s. He has also been involved in several other music projects such as Strictly American and Dodd Ferrelle and the Tinfoil Stars.

== Career ==
In early 1979, Crowe and his friend Bill Tabor sat and listened to Michael Lachowski and Randy Bewley play the same riff over and over in their practice space which was below his apartment in downtown Athens–the original 40 Watt Club, named for a single bulb on a wire that hung overhead. Crowe went downstairs and knocked on their door and offered his services as a drummer. He had played drums since he was a little boy and one of his dreams was to someday play in a band. The sound of the band came together after he joined and Vanessa Briscoe Hay came aboard as the vocalist. Pylon played several parties and caught the attention of the B-52's, who helped them obtain a booking in New York City which was the major goal of the band at the time. After opening for the Gang of Four on their first two United States tour dates, Pylon was able to keep returning to play dates in the northeastern United States and began to record for DB Records in Atlanta, Georgia. They opened for the B-52's in Central Park, toured England in late 1980 and released their first album Gyrate.

Crowe came up with the idea, after seeing some of the clubs that existed in the Northeast, that it was possible to open your own club without too much effort or money, so with the help of his friend Paul Scales, the 40 Watt Club opened in downtown Athens above Yudy's Subs in what had been something called the "Crow's nest". The club proved to be very popular and the floor had to be reinforced with portable beams for all the heavy dancing taking place overhead.

Pylon recorded another album and two singles and broke up in 1983 after touring with U2 for a few of the dates on their first American tour. Pylon was becoming too much like a business for some of the members' tastes, so it was agreed to break up and they did.

Crowe married and settled down and finished school. The documentary film Athens, GA inside/out was released and there seemed to be more interest in Pylon than ever. Pylon reformed, but this time with more business-like practices in place. They recorded another album and toured with R.E.M. and the B-52's. They had a manager. But Pylon broke up again.

Crowe and his wife went on to have two children and he began to work in the film/TV industry as a construction coordinator. He has worked on films like Blue Crush, where he was responsible for "the rock", Cool Runnings and more recently, the first season of Lost, We are Marshall and Californication. He is now divorced, but maintains an amiable relationship with his former wife and children.

Pylon reformed for fun from 2005 to 2009. DFA Records reissued Gyrate on CD, Pylon's first album with bonus tracks, and called it Gyrate Plus.

== Discography ==
With Pylon

- Cool/Dub 7" single (Caution Records 1979)
- Gyrate LP (DB records, Armageddon 1980)
- Pylon !! EP (DB records, Armageddon 1980)
- Crazy/M-Train 7" single (DD Records 1981)
- Beep/Altitude 7" single (DB Records 1982)
- Four Minutes/Beep/Altitude EP (DB Records 1982)
- Chomp LP (DB Records 1983)
- Hits LP/CD (DB Records 1988)
- Chain LP/CD (Sky Records 1990)
- Gyrate Plus CD (DFA Records 2007)
- Pylon Live (2016)
- Pylon Box (2020)

=== Compilations ===
==== With Pylon (band) ====
- Declaration of Independents - 13 Tracks of U.S. Rock 1980, Vinyl LP, Various artists (1980, Ambition Records AMB1, Basement Records BASE 6005, Stiff Records Yank 2)
- Jericho Go, Vinyl LP, Various artists (1985, DB Recs / Stiff Records D BAT80) (DB Recs / Victor Musical Industries, Inc. VIL 28034)
- Athens, GA - Inside / Out, Vinyl LP, Various artists (1987, I.R.S. Records IRS6185)
- Hits, Cassette, CD (1989, DB Recs DB91)
- Squares Blot Out the Sun, Vinyl LP, CD, Cassette, Various artists (1990, DB Recs DB72)
- Totally Wired, CD, Various artists (1995, Razor & Tie RE 2076)
- KFJC 98.7 Fifty - Blowing Minds Since 1959, Vinyl double record LP, Various artists (2009, No label KJFC24)
- Keith Haring - The World of Keith Haring - Influences + Connections , Vinyl triple record LP boxset, Triple CD boxset, Various artists (2019, Soul Jazz, Ltd. SJR LP444)
- Blank Generation- A Story of US and Canadian Punk and It's Aftershocks 1975-1981, Five CD boxset, Various artists (2023, Cherry Red Records, (CRCDBOX147)
