= No Great Lost: Songs, 1979–1985 =

Compilation album by Kevin Dunn
- Released: May 2010
- Recorded: 1979–1985
- Studio: Channel One, Atlanta, Georgia, US; Son Bruneville, Atlanta, Georgia, US; Songbird, Atlanta, Georgia, US
- Genre: New wave
- Label: DB; Press; Casa Nueva

Professional ratings
Review scores
Source	Rating
AllMusic	4.5/5 stars
Blurt	10/10 stars
The Boston Phoenix	3.5/4 stars
Critical Mob	4/5 stars
Pitchfork	7.5/10

No Great Lost: Songs, 1979–1985 is an anthology of songs recorded by Atlanta-based singer-songwriter Kevin Dunn between 1979 and 1985, including the entirety of his critically acclaimed 1981 album The Judgment of Paris, originally released on DB Records. In The Trouser Press Record Guide, critic Ira Robbins described The Judgment of Paris as "a striking modern-music pop album" that "mixes technical flash with semi-demented musical ideas."

This 21 track compilation also includes three songs from the 1983 EP C'est toujours la meme guitare (Press Records), four from the 1985 LP Tanzfeld (Press Records), both sides of a 1979 45-rpm single, and one song from Dunn's 1970s post-punk band the Fans, "Cars and Explosions". It was released on 18 May 2010 through Casa Nueva Records.

== Track listing ==
No.	Title	Length
1.	"911"	3:17
2.	"AG"	4:32
3.	"Tootsie 1"	2:34
4.	"Tootsie 2"	3:10
5.	"20,000 Years In Sing Sing"	2:57
6.	"Giovinezza"	3:56
7.	"Creep"	3:57
8.	"Saturn"	4:29
9.	"Private Sector"	4:59
10.	"Somewhere Over the Rainbow"	4:13
11.	"Fourth of July"	5:09
12.	"Sharks"	4:09
13.	"Timelife"	3:55
14.	"Mona"	4:03
15.	"Nam"	3:20
16.	"Clear Title"	3:22
17.	"9148"	2:50
18.	"Louie, Louie"	3:41
19.	"Nadine"	4:24
20.	"Oktyabrina"	3:44
21.	"Cars and Explosions"	3:07
