= Gyrate =

Gyrate may refer to:

- Gyrus, a ridge on the cerebral cortex
- Gyration, a type of rotation

== Music ==
- Gyrate (album), a 1980 album by Pylon
- "Gyrate", song by Pylon from Chomp (album)
- "Gyrate", song by WizKid from Made in Lagos
