= Magnet Factory =

Studio album by Pylon Reenactment Society
- Released: February 9, 2024
- Studio: Bel*Air Studio, Athens, Georgia, US; Chase Park Transduction Studios, Athens, Georgia, US; Orange Door Studio, Woodstock, New York, US; Subvon Studio, Winterville, Georgia, US
- Length: 37:54
- Language: English
- Label: Strolling Bones Records
- Producer: Vanessa Briscoe Hay; Jason NeSmith

Pylon Reenactment Society chronology
Part Time Punks Session (2017)	Magnet Factory (2024)

If Pylon, Patti Smith Group and the Feelies had a baby, it might be this song. It's a kinetic tribute to those who teach us how to fix it. Shero Kate Pierson joins me for a duet. I've been a fan of the B-52s since I first saw them at the Last Resort. About a year ago at the final date of their last tour in Athens, GA, I had the idea that Kate would be a perfect fit on "Fix It"—we had just finished laying down the tracks for our album and were due in the studio the following week to mix it. I got up the nerve to ask her if she would as we were saying goodbye. She said yes and recorded it the next week. Kate's timing is perfect—her vocal track was delivered five minutes after we had finished mixing the rest of the album. We were "over the moon" when we heard her vocals.

—Vocalist Vanessa Briscoe Hay on the track "Fix It", guest-starring fellow Athens, Georgia singer Kate Pierson

Magnet Factory is the debut full-length studio album by American rock band Pylon Reenactment Society. It has received positive reviews from critics and was promoted by live touring by the band and music videos for "3 x 3" and "Fix It". The album includes two tracks written by Pylon, a band that also included vocalist Vanessa Briscoe Hay, who formed this group in 2014.

== Reception ==
Writing for the Associated Press, Steven Wine wrote that vocalist Vanessa Briscoe Hay has not mellowed with age and this music "sounds as fresh as Pylon first did" and ended "from start to finish, the band is an irresistible blend of simplicity and synchronicity, the music both edgy and therapeutic". Lee Valentine Smith of The Atlanta Journal-Constitution wrote that these songs "deftly recall the kinetic New Wave energy of the original Pylon ethos, tempered by a decidedly pop mindset". Ryan Dillon of Glide Magazine praised Hay's vocals as "a welcomed trip down memory lane as she displays her magnificent range of honed arrangements" in an album that is inconsistent but this quality "lends to its charm and those stunning peaks it hits have quite the view, from up here you can see her lofty ideas become reality like the perfect sunrise". At PopMatters, Allison Ross rated this album an 8 out of 10 and also praised the vocals as "relatable" and also wrote that the music has "hearty hooks [and] magnetic melodies" with a mix of genres that includes "jangle pop, garage rock, dance punk, and new wave with equal skill and flair". Ross' colleague Jedd Beaudoin reviewed "Heaven (In Your Eyes)" on the day the album was released, stating that the track "reminds listeners of Pylon's forward-thinking sound, its alternate ability to report on the zeitgeist and predict what future generations would embrace", which "sounds like it could have emerged in 1978 or 2024 or at a moment in time we have not yet reached". In Uncut, Rob Hughes scored this album 4 out of 5 stars.

== Track listing ==
1. "Spiral" (Vanessa Briscoe Hay, Matthew Jason NeSmith, Gregory Rush Sanders, and Kay Suzanne Stanton) – 1:39
2. "Educate Me" (Damon Cordele Denton, Hay, NeSmith, Joseph Aloysius Rowe III, Sanders, and Stanton) – 3:55
3. "Flowers Everywhere" (Denton, Hay, NeSmith, Rowe, Sanders, and Stanton) – 3:10
4. "Messenger" (Denton, Hay, NeSmith, Rowe, Sanders, and Stanton) – 3:40
5. "3 x 3" (Randall Eugene Bewley, Curtis Hudgins Crowe, Hay, and Michael Scott Lachowski) – 2:03
6. "Fix It" (Hay, NeSmith, Rowe, Sanders, and Stanton) – 5:09
7. "Boom Boom" (Hay, NeSmith, Rowe, Sanders, and Stanton) – 3:06
8. "Heaven (In Your Eyes)" (Bewley, Crowe, Hay, and Lachowski) – 4:35
9. "No Worries" (Denton, Hay, NeSmith, Rowe, Sanders, and Stanton) – 2:05
10. "Compression" (Denton, Hay, NeSmith, Rowe, Sanders, and Stanton) – 4:53
11. "I'll Let You Know" (Denton, Hay, NeSmith, Rowe, Sanders, and Stanton) – 3:39

== Personnel ==
Pylon Reenactment Society

- Vanessa Briscoe Hay – vocals, production
- Jason NeSmith – guitar, recording (Bel*Air Studios), production, audio mastering
- Gregory Sanders – drums
- Kay Stanton – bass guitar, backing vocals

Additional personnel

- Tom Ashton – recording, audio engineering (Subvon)
- David Barbe – recording, audio engineering (Chase Park Transduction), mixing on all tracks except "I'll Let You Know"
- Christy Bush – photography
- Andy LeMaster – recording, mixing on "I'll Let You Know"
- Michael Lachowski – layout, graphics
- Kate Pierson – vocals on "Fix It"
- John Valesio – recording (Orange Door)

== See also ==
- 2024 in American music
- 2024 in rock music
- List of 2024 albums
