= The Human Body =

The Human Body may refer to:

- The human body, the entire structure of a human being

== Music ==
- The Human Body (EP), a 2005 EP by The Electric Soft Parade
- "The Human Body", song by Pylon from Gyrate (1980)
- "The Human Body", song by Prince from Emancipation (1996)

== Film and television ==
- The Human Body (1945 film)
- The Human Body (TV series), a 1998 BBC One television series, later made into a 2001 film
