= Themes from Venus =

Studio album by Love Tractor
- Released: 1988
- Label: DB
- Producers: Mitch Easter, Love Tractor

Love Tractor chronology
This Ain't No Outer Space Ship (1987)	Themes from Venus (1988)	The Sky at Night (2001)

Themes from Venus is an album by the American band Love Tractor. It was released in 1988, and marked a return to an independent label, after the bankruptcy of RCA-affiliated Big Time Records.

The band broke up after promoting the album, but reunited a few times over the course of the 1990s; while promoting the album, Love Tractor became the first rock band to play at Jamestown, Virginia. Love Tractor also promoted Themes from Venus by touring with Too Much Joy and by opening for the B-52s on their Cosmic Thing tour.

Themes from Venus was rereleased in remastered versions in 2022 on Propeller Sound Recordings. The CD and digital versions include six new mixes, including some by Brendan O'Brien.

== Production ==
The album was produced by Mitch Easter and Love Tractor. The band recorded the songs they had, without doing any preproduction work before entering the studio.

== Critical reception ==
Professional ratings
Review scores
Source	Rating
AllMusic	4.5/5 stars
Chicago Tribune	3/4 stars
The Encyclopedia of Popular Music	4/5 stars
MusicHound Rock: The Essential Album Guide	3.5/5 stars

The Globe and Mail considered the album to be the band's best to that point, calling it "full of quirky invention and strange, funny pop sounds." Spin deemed the songs "lusty and inebriating, an extended headrush without the hangover." The Chicago Tribune stated that, "wrapped in a deceptively easygoing aura, Love Tractor's full, rich-textured sound nonetheless hits a propulsive groove more than once, layering guitar lines that alternate between fat, echoey notes and icy little stabs over a solid rhythmic underpinning from bass and drums."

The St. Petersburg Times determined that "it's a cunning foray into densely textured, multilayered pop that belies their Athens roots and may be their best effort to date... Themes from Venus isn't an artistic statement so much as a sonic playground, a therapeutic avenue for Easter and Love Tractor to escape their respective pigeonholes." The Calgary Herald noted that the band is "still a quirky and delightful blend of discarded pop riffs, odd instrumentals and strange lyrics to tickle one's eccentric fancies."

AllMusic wrote that "the tunes on Themes from Venus are longer and less structured than those on Outerspace Ship, the grooves are at once loopier and more prominent, and while most of the songs have vocals, the words take a definite back seat to the music."

== Track listing ==
No.	Title	Length
1.	"I Broke My Saw"
2.	"Themes from Venus"
3.	"Crash"
4.	"Satan"
5.	"Crystal World"
6.	"Venice"
7.	"Hey Mess"
8.	"Nova Express"
9.	"Fantasy"
10.	"Here Comes the Cops"
11.	"Crash (Inst. Version)"
12.	"Satan (Inst. Version)"

Additional tracks on Propeller Sound Recordings remastered and expanded edition

- "Nighttime Time Zone" (Brendan O'Brien mix)
- "Hey Mess" (O'Brien mix)
- "Fantasy" (Instrumental Mitch Easter mix)
- "I Broke My Saw" (Long Version Easter mix)
- "Satan's New Wave Soul Losers" (Instrumental Easter mix)
- "Crash" (Instrumental Easter Mix)
