= The Side Effects (band) =

The Side Effects were an indie rock band, part of the music scene of Athens, Georgia. The Side Effects debuted in 1980, alongside other local performers like R.E.M.

== History ==
The band was started by Kit Swartz and Paul Butchart, who knew R.E.M. members Michael Stipe and Peter Buck. According to Buck, the two were supposed to play in a band with himself and Stipe, but never showed up to practice. The two bands, however, would cross paths again later that year when The Side Effects, along with Men In Trees, made their musical debut with R.E.M. at an Athens party. R.E.M., then named Twisted Kites, would headline, and the Side Effects, composed of Butchart, Swartz, and Jimmy Ellison made their debut as an opener.

The band would gain prominent local publicity, being in a scene that produced The B-52's, Love Tractor, and Pylon, all of which would receive varying degrees of success in the future. The band also opened a spinoff of the famous local Athens 40 Watt Club called the 40 Watt East in May 1980, which was opened across the street and later merged back to the original.

The band would disband in 1982. While R.E.M. would release their album Murmur to critical acclaim, other Athens-area bands would break up, including the Side Effects; Ellison was diagnosed with an inoperable brain tumor a year later.

Butchart still lives in the Athens area today, giving tours of the city as well as acting as a primary source in a variety of R.E.M. literature such as David Buckley's biography of R.E.M., R.E.M.: Fiction, and posting on the internet on various message boards, websites and Usenet news groups. Jimmy Ellison is laid to rest in Monroe, Ga. In the Monroe cemetery. His grave is on the West side of the Western road. The self-titled LP they created had 4 tracks: "Raining", "Pyramids", "French Forest", and "Through with you". The 1990 reunion show at the 40 Watt Club, W. Clayton, included Mike Mills of R.E.M. playing drums and Paul Butchart dancing. All of the members were self-taught musicians. Paul Butchart has lived more than 27 years in the same house at 653 N. Milledge ave. Kit Swartz is living in Thailand with his wife and family. Paul Butchart once ran for Mayor of Athens due to a simple moral principal: the incumbent was running unopposed. When asked what advice to give future musicians or artists, Paul Butchart stated "Anybody can do it; don't hesitate, just do it and see what happens"; Paul still performs with the band "Saint Eel", ("St. Eel"). The actual area that the "B-52's" played in for the first time at his house is a small room just inside of the front door.
