= Pylon Reenactment Society =

American rock band

- Origin: Athens, Georgia, United States
- Genres: New wave, post-punk, jangle pop, alternative rock, funk rock
- Years active: 2014-present
- Labels: PRS for Chunklet Industries; Strolling Bones Records
- Members: Vanessa Briscoe Hay; Jason NeSmith; Gregory Sanders; Kay Stanton
- Past members: Damon Denton; Joe Rowe
- Website: https://www.pylonreenactmentsociety.com

Pylon Reenactment Society is an American rock band from Athens, Georgia.

Since 2014, Vanessa Briscoe Hay, who was the singer of Pylon, has fronted the Pylon Reenactment Society, aka PRS, a band featuring members of more recent Athens bands like The Glands and Casper & the Cookies who perform the music of Pylon and now are writing and recording original material.

In a 2016 Portland Mercury interview, Hay said, "It's been inspirational, if that's the right word, to be able to play this music again. I really don't want people to forget Pylon. These are different people and we are re-enacting this experience, so it's not exactly Pylon, but it's fresh and done in the same spirit".

In October 2017, Pylon Reenactment Society self-released an EP that was initially recorded on December 11, 2016 for broadcast in Los Angeles, California for DJ Michael Stock's Part Time Punks KXLU show, titled Part Time Punks Session.

Hay was named one of the "25 Best Frontwomen of All Time" by Paste Magazine in March 2018.

Pylon Reenactment Society released a 7-inch single with two brand-new songs, "Messenger" backed with "Cliff Notes" in late November 2018. Critic Falling James noted the new release in his LA Times article for upcoming shows in the LA area: "The A-side is an intriguing track as Hay purrs enigmatically over a rubbery bass line and sliced-up guitar accents, emphasizing that the charismatic vocalist's worldview is just as (post)modern as ever."

On May 28, 2019, Pylon Reenactment Society performed at Primavera Sound 2019 in Barcelona, Spain upon a brand new stage sponsored by Heineken just for cult artists.

On September 29, 2023 Pylon Reenactment Society announced the release of their debut album, Magnet Factory, which came out February 9, 2024 on Strolling Bones Records. It was produced by Briscoe Hay and NeSmith and recorded by David Barbe (Drive-by Truckers) and Tom Ashton (March Violets). ‘Magnet Factory’ features nine originals and two unrecorded Pylon tunes from their earliest days. Met with critical acclaim, Uncut Magazine awarded the album an 8/10 rating in the March 2024 issue, saying "Magnet Factory finds the quartet in scintillating form, shifting smartly between angular noise-pop and nervy punk-funk, topped with Hay’s spiky vocals… a terrific debut from American post-punk veterans." The Associated Press said, "...Briscoe Hay remains a distinctive, boundary-defying songwriter… Amid the algorithm-driven din that now fills earbuds, Magnet Factory sounds as fresh as Pylon first did… from start to finish, the band is an irresistible blend of simplicity and synchronicity, the music both edgy and therapeutic."

"3 x 3," was the album Magnet Factory’s first digital single / video. "3 x 3" was originally written by Pylon (band) back in 1979," Vanessa tells us. "We had fun playing it live, but it didn’t make the cut for Gyrate and fell by the wayside. During subsequent reunions, it sometimes crept back into our set, but was never formally recorded. Pylon Reenactment Society rediscovered it, started playing it live, and have made this bouncy little earworm our own." October 27, 2023 found the debut of a digital single and video for “Flowers Everywhere in Magnet Magazine, an online magazine. "The 'Flowers Everywhere' video was directed by Dan Aguar, who worked on 'Can't Get There From Here' and 'The One I Love' as well as other '80s MTV classics." A non album holiday single "Christmas Daze" debuted December 1, 2023 in Under The Radar magazine. Their review reads “ “Christmas Daze” is a brisk and understated effort, one that meditates on the lonely side of the holiday but also brims with a welcoming energy. Briscoe Hay’s vocals are warm and lilting while the rhythm section brings the track along at a steady propulsive pace, carried by an ever-present bass riff and shimmering bursts of guitar. The lush washes of guitar and tambourine that accent the song feel like Christmas lights going on and off, punctuating the track’s lyrics with cozy swells of melody and gentle rays of hope.” On January 19, 2024 the video for the single “Fix It,” featuring vocals from Kate Pierson of The B-52’s, premiered in Paste Magazine. The video was directed by Dominic DeJoseph (R.E.M., Arthur Buck). “I’ve been a B-52’s fan since the first time I saw them, which was their third show ever,” Briscoe Hay says. “They were always supportive of Pylon. When I saw their final show in Athens, it struck me that Kate would be perfect for that particular song. It was such an honor to have one of my all time musical heroes sing on our song.” On February 9, 2024 in conjunction with the release of ‘Magnet Factory’, a video for “Heaven (In Your Eyes)” was released. The song was written by Pylon (band) in 1979, but never formally recorded in the studio. The video \ short was directed by Professor of Film at Augusta University, Matthew Buzzell. Buzzell is perhaps best known for his documentaries for indie band Luna and legendary jazz balladeer Jimmy Scott. Director Buzzell notes, “The opportunity to create something for Vanessa and the band is truly an honor. It has also afforded me the incredible opportunity to forge a small tie to Pylon, a band so very important and so very dear to me.”

== Discography ==
=== EPs & Singles ===
- Part Time Punks Session Vinyl 6 song 12" EP (PRS, October 20, 2017) PRS001 with Chunklet Industries.
- Messenger / Cliff Notes Vinyl 7” Single (PRS, November 30, 2018) PRS002 with Chunklet Industries.
- 3 x 3 Digital Single (September 29, 2023) SB27 with Strolling Bones Records.
- Flowers Everywhere Digital Single (October 27, 2023) SB27 with Strolling Bones Records.
- Christmas Daze Digital Single (December 1, 2023) SB29 with Strolling Bones Records.
- Fix It (feat.Kate Pierson) Digital Single (January 19, 2024) SB27 with Strolling Bones Records.
- Heaven (In Your Eyes) Digital Single (February 9, 2024) SB27 with Strolling Bones Records.

=== Albums ===
- Magnet Factory LP, CD, Digital (February 9, 2024) SB27 with Strolling Bones Records.

== Video ==
- Beep (2017), Pylon Reenactment Society, from Vinyl 12” Ep Part Time Punks Session, PRS for Chunklet Industries, from unreleased documentary “Athens, GA...30 Years On” directed by Bill Cody, edited by Tony Brazier.
- Messenger (2018), Pylon Reenactment Society, from Vinyl 7 inch Single Messenger / Cliff Notes, PRS for Chunklet Industries, directed by Tony Brazier.
- 3 x 3 (2023), Pylon Reenactment Society, from Digital Single 3 x 3, for Strolling Bones Records, directed by Bill Cody and Tony Brazier.
- Flowers Everywhere (2023), Pylon Reenactment Society, from Digital Single Flowers Everywhere, for Strolling Bones Records, directed by Dan Aguar.
- Fix It (2023), Pylon Reenactment Society, from Digital Single Fix It, for Strolling Bones Records, directed by Dominic J. DeJoseph.
- Heaven (In Your Eyes) (2023), Pylon Reenactment Society, from Digital Single Heaven (In Your Eyes), for Strolling Bones Records, directed by Matthew Buzzell
