= Blue Tomorrow (album) =

Studio album by the Swimming Pool Q's
- Released: 1986
- Studio: Studio One
- Genre: Rock, pop
- Label: A&M
- Producer: Mike Howlett

The Swimming Pool Q's chronology
The Swimming Pool Q's (1984)	Blue Tomorrow (1986)	World War Two Point Five (1989)

Blue Tomorrow is the third album by the American band the Swimming Pool Q's, released in 1986. "Pretty on the Inside" was the first single. The band supported the album with European and North American tours. They were dropped by A&M Records following the promotional cycle for Blue Tomorrow.

== Production ==
Recorded at Studio One, near Atlanta, the album was produced by Mike Howlett. The band spent a longer period of time in the studio, in part because they had bought a lot of new equipment prior to the recording sessions. Frontman Jeff Calder changed his lyrical approach, cutting down on clichéd imagery and songs about the past. "Big Fat Tractor" is a rerecording of a song from the band's debut. The title track is a duet between Anne Richmond Boston and Calder. "Laredo Radio" was written while the band was touring with Lou Reed.

== Critical reception ==
Professional ratings
Review scores
Source	Rating
All Music Guide to Rock	3/5 stars
The Baltimore Sun	4/5 stars
The Encyclopedia of Popular Music	3/5 stars
The Great Indie Discography	5/10
Houston Chronicle	4/5 stars
Omaha World-Herald	3/5 stars
The Philadelphia Inquirer	4/4 stars
Record-Journal	A−
The Rolling Stone Album Guide	3.5/5 stars
The Tampa Tribune	3/4 stars

The Philadelphia Inquirer said that the album "establishes this quintet as a highly original outfit with impressive range." The Sun Sentinel opined that "Boston has one of the most underrated voices in pop music." The Los Angeles Times advised, "If you've ever wondered what it would be like if Mary Travers fronted a rock 'n' roll band ... the answer might be close to the sound of ... Boston's pretty, pretty vocals atop the rocking, rocking music of Georgia's Swimming Pool Q's"; the paper later listed the album among the best of 1986.

The Baltimore Sun praised the "good, mainstream rock". The Grand Forks Herald stated that most of Boston's vocals "are layered over gross out-of-style gloss." The Houston Chronicle concluded that "as soon the Q's establish the framework of a song they nearly undermine it with an unexpected rhythmic twist." The Omaha World-Herald said that "the only constant is the precise guitar work of Bob Elsey and ... Calder."

== Track listing ==
No.	Title	Length
1.	"Now I'm Talking About Now"
2.	"She's Lookin' Real Good (When She's Lookin')"
3.	"Pretty on the Inside"
4.	"Laredo Radio"
5.	"Wreck Around"
6.	"More Than One Heaven"
7.	"Corruption"
8.	"Blue Tomorrow"
9.	"A Dream in Gray"
10.	"Big Fat Tractor"
