= Double Coda =

Studio album by the Glands
- Released: November 9, 2018
- Recorded: 1996–2003
- Length: 74:17
- Label: New West
- Producer: David Barbe

The Glands chronology
The Glands (2000)	Double Coda (2018)	I Can See My House from Here (2018)

Singles from Double Coda
- 1. "So High" / "Electricity" Released: October 9, 2018; 2. "Atmosphere" / "Every Time I Listen to a Stranger" Released: October 12, 2018

Double Coda is the third and final studio album by American indie rock band the Glands, released by New West Records on November 9, 2018. It was the first new material by the band in 18 years.

== Background ==
During the 18-year hiatus between The Glands and Double Coda, the band had written some new material. The band reunited for the final time in 2014, and front-man Ross Shapiro announced that the third studio album was nearing completion. Following Shapiro's Lung cancer death in 2016 at the age of 53, drummer Joe Rowe, producer David Barbe, Gland Derek Almstead, and New West Records compiled and completed 23 of these new tracks into one final studio album by request of Shapiro. It was released as a standalone double LP and as part of a box set of every recording by the band, I Can See My House From Here.

== Critical reception ==
Professional ratings
Review scores
Source	Rating
AllMusic	4.5/5 stars

Tim Sendra of AllMusic wrote that "it's clear that the Glands could have made at least one more brilliant record, and probably more, judging by the tracks here", calling them "a bracing mix of AOR-friendly rockers ('Have Your Cake' and 'Feelies'), bubbling electropop ('Electricity'), dreamy ballads ('Possibilities'), and piano pop that puts Ben Folds to shame ('Todd Work')."

== Track listing ==
Double Coda track listing
No.	Title	Length
1.	"So High"	2:53
2.	"Pleaser"	3:05
3.	"Electricity"	4:20
4.	"Possibilities"	3:31
5.	"Every Time I Listen to a Stranger"	3:19
6.	"Todd Work"	2:49
7.	"Sofa"	2:28
8.	"Clover"	4:34
9.	"Have Your Cake"	2:19
10.	"Piano Jazz"	2:18
11.	"Great Waves"	3:57
12.	"Pie"	2:53
13.	"Rose"	3:13
14.	"Atmosphere"	3:27
15.	"Rufino Tamayo"	2:07
16.	"A Boy Without a Head"	4:04
17.	"Tom Robertson"	2:37
18.	"Sadie Song"	3:36
19.	"Peter Acoustic"	3:19
20.	"Body and Soul"	2:45
21.	"(A Screwed Up Way of Saying) I Want You"	3:47
22.	"Feelies"	3:43
23.	"Save a Place For You"	3:02
Total length:		74:17
