= Kevin Dunn (musician) =

American musician

Kevin Dunn (also known as Kevin McFoy Dunn), born 10 October 1951 in Jacksonville, Florida, is an American guitarist, producer, singer, and songwriter who first came to public notice in the context of the fertile new wave scene that arose in Athens and Atlanta, Georgia, in the late 1970s.

== The Fans (1975–1979) ==
In 1975, Dunn and collaborator Alfredo Villar formed the Fans, one of the first Southeastern bands for whom the influence of blues or country music was not primary, their chief inspiration lying instead in the British art rock of the era (Brian Eno, Roxy Music, Robert Fripp, etc.). The band issued three singles — the second of which, "Cars and Explosions" (b/w "Dangerous Goodbyes"), was released on Dai Davies' Albion label. They disbanded in 1979.

== Solo career ==
=== From 1978 to 1985 ===
As the Fans wound down, Dunn was concurrently pursuing a solo career as both performer and producer. In 1978, he co-produced the B-52s' debut single "Rock Lobster" for the independent label DB Records, the success of which was instrumental in setting the stage for the Athens, Georgia, quintet's subsequent stardom. In the following year Dunn co-produced the first single by the Athens band Pylon, "Cool" (b/w "Dub"). In 1979, he released his first solo single, a version of Chuck Berry's "Nadine" (b/w "Oktyabrina"). In 1980, he co-produced Pylon's first LP, Gyrate.

Dunn's first solo album, The Judgement of Paris, received a joint release by DB and the UK label Armageddon in 1981. He followed that with the 1983 maxi-EP C'est Toujours La Même Guitarre; released on Peter Dyer's Press Records, it was widely reviewed; with positive notices by Robert Palmer of The New York Times, comparing the artist's distortion-and-modulation-heavy guitar sound to "angry animals and natural catastrophes", and Anthony DeCurtis of Rolling Stone, remarking that Dunn explores "how far harmony can be pushed before it disintegrates into noise". Released in 1985, Dunn's second LP, Tanzfeld (also on Press), earned a B+ from Robert Christgau in The Village Voice, and Ira Robins described it in Trouser Press as "simply brilliant, a collection of adroit pop tunes".

A review of his three solo albums published in The Rolling Stone Album Guide (1992) highlighted that "Dunn's songs ambitiously employ the harmonic structures of high classical music, with the wit and occasional pop catchiness of '70s British pop".

=== Since 1985 ===
From 1985 to 2010, Dunn restricted himself to local live performance — chiefly solo guitar, featuring ambient pieces and baroque repertory performed on a replica 17th-century instrument.

A comprehensive anthology titled No Great Lost: Songs, 1979–1985 was released on the Boston-based label Casa Nueva in May 2010. In September of that year, encouraged by the tenor of the retrospective's critical reception, Dunn mounted a mini-tour of the Northeast, with dates in Washington, D.C.; Manhattan and Brooklyn; Cambridge and Amherst, Massachusetts, and Durham, North Carolina. It was the first time in 30 years that he had played live outside the Atlanta metropolitan area.

The following December, plans were laid with Casa Nueva for the release of Dunn's first collection of new material since Tanzfeld, but though the audio component of the album, titled The Miraculous Miracle of the Imperial Empire, was completed in mid-2012, a series of reverses later in the year led to the effective dissolution of the label as a going concern, and the project stalled out. However, encouraged by his defunct label's management, Dunn issued the collection online in July 2013.

Resident in Athens since 2016, Dunn in 2017 began performing on guitar, mandolin and electric sitar with the local ensemble Cosmo Jr and appears on the albums Sisters in Arms (2018) and Athens Legends (2021).
