= The Glands (album) =

Studio album by the Glands
- Released: August 1, 2000
- Genre: Indie rock, pop
- Label: Capricorn

The Glands chronology
Double Thriller (1996)	The Glands (2000)	Double Coda (2018)

The Glands is an album by the American band the Glands, released on August 1, 2000. The band supported the album with a North American tour. Its commercial prospects were damaged by the closure of the band's label, Capricorn Records, months after the album's release. It was reissued in 2001 by Phil Walden's subsequent label, Velocette Records.

== Production ==
The majority of the album was produced by the band. Frontman Ross Shapiro was inspired primarily by pop music from the 1970s. He double tracked his vocals for the harmonies. Many of the songs are marked by the absence of the irony found in much of the indie rock of the 1990s and are about youth and young adulthood, with lyrics that take the form of internal monologues; other songs deal with the problems of adulthood. "I Can See My House from Here" originally contained a sample of the Four Seasons' "December, 1963 (Oh, What a Night)", but it was removed when the band was unable to obtain a copyright clearance.

== Critical reception ==
Professional ratings
Review scores
Source	Rating
AllMusic	4.5/5 stars
The Austin Chronicle	3/5 stars
Des Moines Register	4/5 stars
Pitchfork	8.7/10
The Press of Atlantic City	2/4 stars
Rolling Stone	3/5 stars
Spin	9/10
The Tampa Tribune	3/4 stars

Guitar Player stated that "the guitar sounds on The Glands are unconventional and unpredictable, with cool clean tones, snotty lead sounds, and beautifully trashy power chords." The Des Moines Register noted that "Shapiro's voice is the plaintive, high-pitched whine you'd expect from an indie rock band, but it's endearing in the vein of, say, Wayne Coyne from the Flaming Lips." Newsday said that "Shapiro emotes like a slacker, vintage 1992, while his mates bend and rip chords ('Livin' Was Easy'), tap keyboards ('Breathe Out') or lay on the Beach Boy harmonies ('When I Laugh')."

The Tampa Tribune praised the "lyrics of unvarnished longing and regret laced with humor and a mixture of various music styles". Rolling Stone said that "the Glands amble through [the songs] at the speed of hand-rolled cigarette smoke, pairing crackly guitar discord with gentle cellos and bell sounds for a sweet-and-sour effect." The Boston Globe called the album "memorable curveball pop." The Atlanta Journal-Constitution and the Orange County Register considered it one of the best albums of 2000. Spin called it "an indie-rock masterpiece of ... creepy beauty".

In 2018, Pitchfork labeled The Glands "a fractured pop dynamo, one sun-dappled aw-shucks anthem after another, strung together with yarn and masking tape."

== Track listing ==
No.	Title	Length
1.	"Livin' Was Easy"
2.	"When I Laugh"
3.	"Swim – Prelude"
4.	"Swim"
5.	"Mayflower"
6.	"Lovetown"
7.	"Straight Down"
8.	"I Can See My House from Here"
9.	"Fortress"
10.	"Work It Out"
11.	"Soul Inspiration"
12.	"Ground"
13.	"Favorite American"
14.	"Breathe Out"
