= Kit Swartz =

American television producer

Kit Swartz is a freelance photographer, former CNN American television producer, and early contributor to the Athens alternative rock scene.

He was a soundman at the Tiananmen Square protests of 1989 with Cynde Strand. He was a cameraman for "Europe on the Brink", which won a 1992 CINE Golden Eagle award.

He was a member of the bands Love Tractor and the Side Effects while a student at University of Georgia.

== Awards ==
- 2009 George Polk Award
- 2009 'International Television & Radio', Amnesty International UK Media Awards
