= Nadine (song) =

"Nadine (Is it You)?"

Single by Chuck Berry
- B-side: "O Rangutang"
- Released: February 1964
- Recorded: November 1963
- Studio: Chess (Chicago)
- Genre: Rock and roll; R&B
- Length: 2:34
- Label: Chess
- Songwriter: Chuck Berry
- Producers: Leonard Chess, Phil Chess

Chuck Berry singles chronology
"Come On" (1961)	"Nadine (Is it You)?" (1964)	"No Particular Place to Go" (1964)

"Nadine (Is It You?)" is a song written and recorded by Chuck Berry. It was released as a single in February 1964 and was the first song that Berry released after finishing a prison term in October 1963.

== Composition ==
After his December 1959 arrest under the Mann Act, Berry eventually served a one-and-a-half-year prison term, from February 1962 to October 1963, for transporting a girl, age 14, across state lines. He had not released a single since "Come On" in October 1961.

"Nadine" was recorded at a November 1963 session at the Chess studio in Chicago, his first after his release from prison. Another song from that session, "You Never Can Tell," would also be released as a single.

The composition resembles Berry's first hit, "Maybellene," similarly featuring lyrics about pursuing a girl, though in "Nadine" the pursuit is not by car but on foot and by taxi. As Berry told Melody Maker, "I took 'Maybellene' and from it got 'Nadine.'"

As William Ruhlmann of Allmusic writes, the lyrics are distinguished by an "unusual use of similes," such as: She moves around like a wayward summer breeze; Moving through the traffic like a mounted cavalier; and I was campaign shouting like a Southern diplomat.

== Chart performance ==
The song was released in February 1964 as a single on Chess (catalogue 1883), backed with "O Rangutang". It peaked at No. 23 on the Billboard Hot 100, No. 7 on the R&B chart, and No. 27 on the UK Singles Chart.

== Reception ==
According to Allmusic, the song had a "profound influence" on the songwriting of Bob Dylan: "One need only listen to 'Nadine (Is It You?)', released in February 1964, and then to the 1965 Dylan album Bringing It All Back Home, with its surreal story-songs, to hear the similarities."

Cash Box described it as "a hard-driving, rhythmic pop-blues tear-jerker essayed with authority and feeling."

In the 1987 documentary film Hail! Hail! Rock 'n' Roll (in which Berry performs "Nadine"), Bruce Springsteen praised the song's lyrics. Springsteen singled out the lines, I saw her from the corner when she turned and doubled back / Started walking toward a coffee-colored Cadillac. "I've never seen a coffee-colored Cadillac, but I know exactly what one looks like," Springsteen says in the film.

== Later versions ==
The song has been recorded by numerous artists including Steve Forbert, John Hammond Jr., Kevin Dunn, Waylon Jennings, Billy Boy Arnold, Dion, George Thorogood, New Riders of the Purple Sage, Juicy Lucy, Dire Straits, George Benson, Michael Nesmith, Motörhead, Dicky Lee, Stan Ridgway, and The Seldom Scene. A rendition of the song was also included near the end of the film The Corsican Brothers by comedians Cheech & Chong based on the novella of the same title by Alexandre Dumas.
