= Love Tractor =

Band from Athens, Georgia

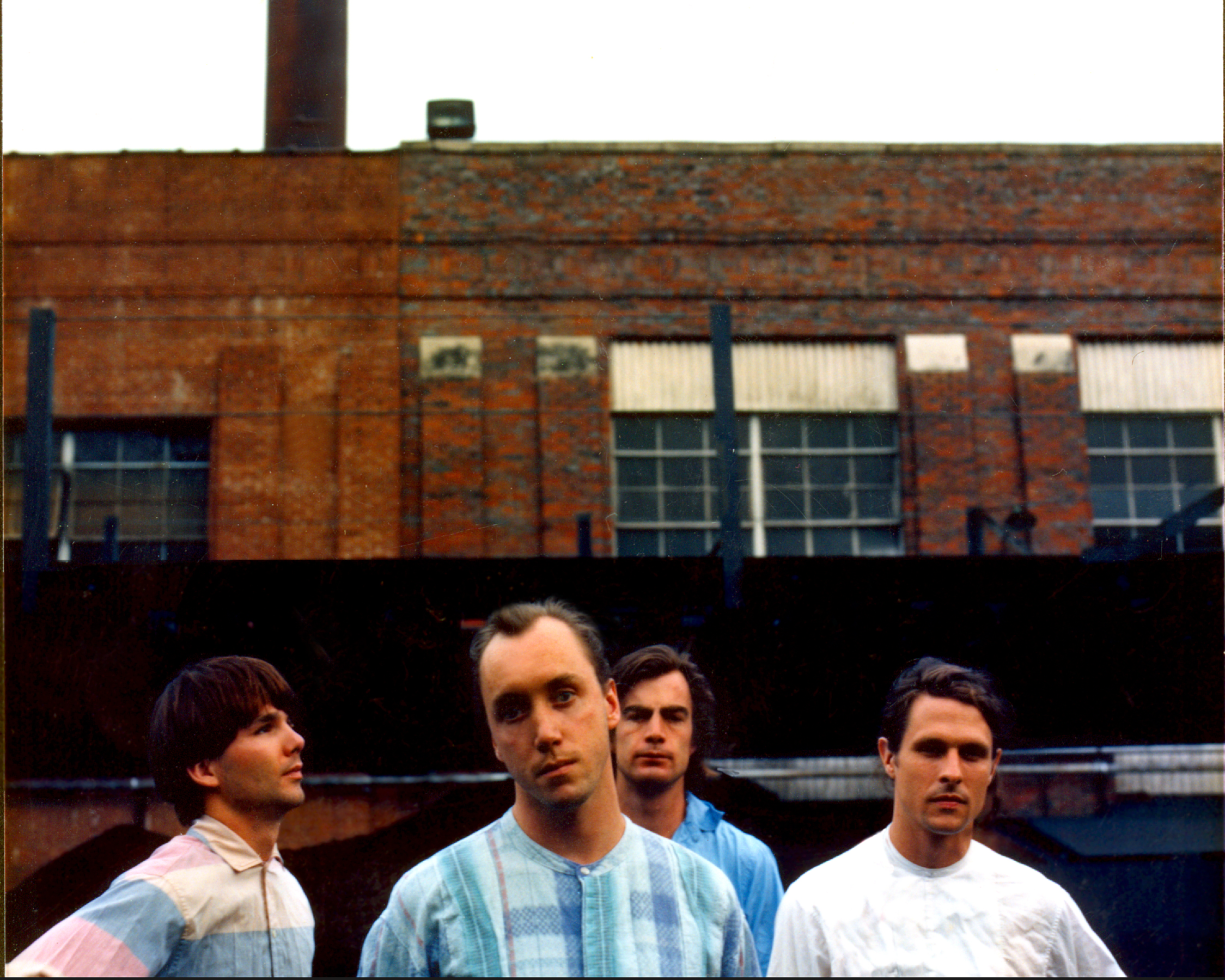
- Love Tractor in 1986

Background information
- Origin: Athens, Georgia, U.S.
- Genre: Alternative rock
- Years active: 1980–2002, 2016–present
- Labels: DB, Big Time, RCA, Razor & Tie
- Past members: Mike Richmond; Mark Cline; Armistead Wellford; Kit Swartz; Bill Berry; Andrew Carter; Tommy Daughtry; Doug Stanley; Tom King; John Poe; Billy Homes; Ben Holst; Tom Lewis; Darren Stanley

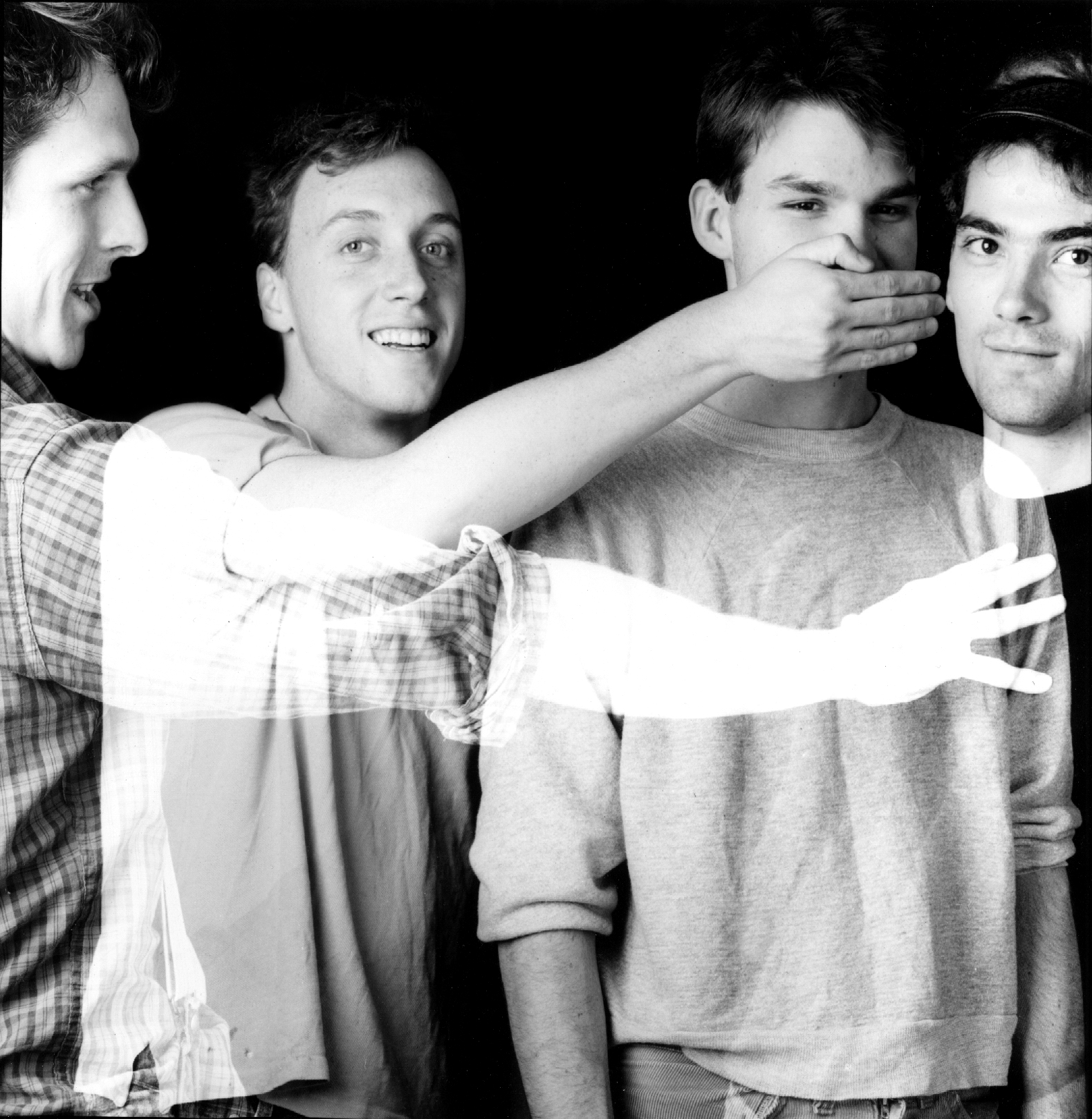
Love Tractor

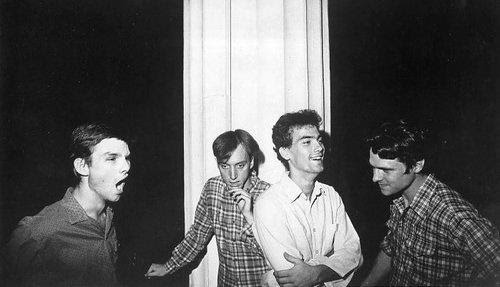
Love Tractor in 1980

Love Tractor is a band from Athens, Georgia, founded in spring 1980 by guitarists Mark Cline and Mike Richmond, and bassist Armistead Wellford, students at the University of Georgia. Like The B-52's, Pylon and R.E.M., Love Tractor has been lauded by critics and music historians as one of the founders of the Athens, Georgia, alternative rock scene. Love Tractor toured extensively and recorded six critically acclaimed albums, consistently topping the college and alternative charts. Love Tractor was particularly known for their instrumental rock.

After a return to the public eye in the late 1990s, Love Tractor released The Sky At Night in 2001. The group went back on hiatus in 2002. They reformed in the mid-2000s with a new line-up which recorded three albums.

In 2016 founding members Armistead Wellford and Mark Cline, along with Bill Berry and multi-instrumentalist Douglas Stanley (of The Glands, who had been a major contributor to the band's 2001 album The Sky at Night), released the instrumental single "A Trip To the Museum", heralding a return to the band's instrumental roots. On August 13, 2016, all original members of Love Tractor (Mark Cline, Mike Richmond, Armistead Wellford and Andrew Carter) reformed to perform at the Athens Popfest at the Georgia Theatre in Athens, Georgia. The band was accompanied on stage by guitarists Bryan Poole (Elf Power, Casper & the Cookies) and Jay Gonzalez (Drive-By Truckers), drummer Joe Rowe (The Glands, Casper & the Cookies, Pylon Reenactment Society), and synthesist Kevin Dunn (The Fans, Regiment of Women). This enhanced version of Love Tractor (including all three original members) continues to perform live and will be re-releasing the Love Tractor catalog on vinyl as well as previously unreleased songs and new material.

== History ==
The band was formed in April 1980 by guitarists Mark Cline, Mike Richmond and bassist Armistead Wellford art students at the University of Georgia. The band played their first few gigs (including their debut on July 9 on Barber Street in Athens also known as Pylon Park) with only a drum machine, but drummers Kit Swartz (formerly of The Side Effects) and Bill Berry (future R.E.M. drummer) soon took over rotating duties as drummer. In 1983 Andrew Carter would take over as full-time drummer; after Carter's departure, John Poe of Guadalcanal Diary rounded out the lineup. Producer and studio keyboard player Alfredo Villar (of The Fans) contributed to the first two albums. Love Tractor originally performed only instrumental material, but minimal vocals from Richmond were added starting with their second album, Around the Bend.

In 1981 the band signed to DB Records. Their first release was a self-titled album, produced by Bruce Baxter (Pylon) and Alfredo Villar. 1983 saw a second album, Around the Bend. While on a tour promoting that album's release, Jon Pareles of The New York Times saw them at Danceteria; in his September 1983 review, he said:

Most of Love Tractor's material moved at the steady pace of 1960's folk-rock, using winsome guitar leads above a cushion of rhythm guitar and a reassuring bass. Like instrumentals by the Ventures or the Raybeats, Love Tractor's tunes use two or three recurring segments and little improvisation. But they don't repeat – they develop. Where song lyrics might have told a story, Love Tractor let the texture of the music thicken. The drumming would get busier, or the bass line pushier, or the lead guitar line more intricate; the clear, catchy melodies grew more urgent with each reprise. When a vocal would float in for a few moments, it was just one more unassuming, thoroughly melodic piece of a song.

After two albums, and a college-chart-topping cover of Kraftwerk's "Neon Lights" (from 1984's "Till The Cows Come Home" EP), the band signed to Big Time (America)/RCA, releasing This Ain't No Outerspace Ship in 1987. After 1989's Themes from Venus, produced by Mitch Easter, the band went on semi-hiatus. Wellford later joined Gutterball. The band stopped touring completely in 1992, but Cline, Richmond, and Wellford continued in Athens to write songs. Later, the original lineup recorded for RCA and Razor and Tie Records. The band re-formed in 1996 as a performing entity eventually recording 2001's 'The Sky at Night' for Razor and Tie..

In 2005 the band released the album Black Hole via Fundamental Records, albeit with a substantially changed line up with only Mike Richmond remaining from the original members, and a new progressive rock-influenced sound, with King Crimson, Yes and Uriah Heep cited as reference points. The following year they released Green Winter and Before and After Christmas, a Christmas album that featured a cover of Pink Floyd's "See Emily Play" and artwork parodying the Brian Eno album Before and After Science, through Fundamental Records.

As of August 2026, Love Tractor is rereleasing their back catalog, to include a 40th anniversary remastering of their album Around The Bend.

== Discography ==
- Love Tractor (1982) DB Records
- Around the Bend (1983) DB Records - US CMJ #32
- Till the Cows Come Home (1984) DB Records - US CMJ #11
- Wheel of Pleasure (1984) DB/Press London
- This Ain't No Outer Space Ship (1987) Big Time RCA Records
- "Party Train" single (1989) Big Time RCA Records
- "Athens Georgia Inside/Out" Soundtrack (1988) IRS Records
- Themes from Venus (1988) DB Records - US CMJ #26
- The Sky at Night (2001) Razor & Tie - US CMJ #144
- Black Hole (2005) Fundamental Records
- Green Winter (2006) Fundamental Records
- Before and After Christmas (2006) Fundamental Records
- A Trip to the Museum (2016) Cosmic Media Single
- "Love Tractor 1880 to 1920 + 200" Single HHBTM Records (2020)
