= The Primates =

American rock band

- Origin: Athens, Ellijay and Gilmer County, Georgia, U.S.
- Genres: Post-punk, Southern rock, alternative rock, college rock, indie rock
- Years active: 1983–1990
- Labels: PS, DRG, Repo
- Members: Eric Sales; Greg Reece; L.H. Sales
- Past members: Mike Whigham (musician); Joe Feeny (musician)

The Primates were one of the original post-punk / rock bands to come out of Athens, Georgia, in the mid-1980s. Their loud, fast in-your-face hedonistic style was reminiscent of West Coast bands X and the Minutemen, but peppered with a definite influence of traditional country music. The Primates consisted of Eric Sales – bass and vocals, Greg Reece – guitar and vocals, and LH Sales Jr. – drums and vocals. Before going three-piece, early in the first years the Primates had a second rockabilly-style guitarist, Mike Whigham. They at one point served as GG Allin's backing band.
