= Athens, GA: Inside/Out =

1987 film by Tony Gayton

- Directed by: Tony Gayton
- Written by: Tony Gayton
- Produced by: Bill Cody
- Cinematography: James Herbert
- Edited by: Adam Wolfe
- Distributed by: ASA Communications
- Release date: November 1986
- Country: United States
- Language: English

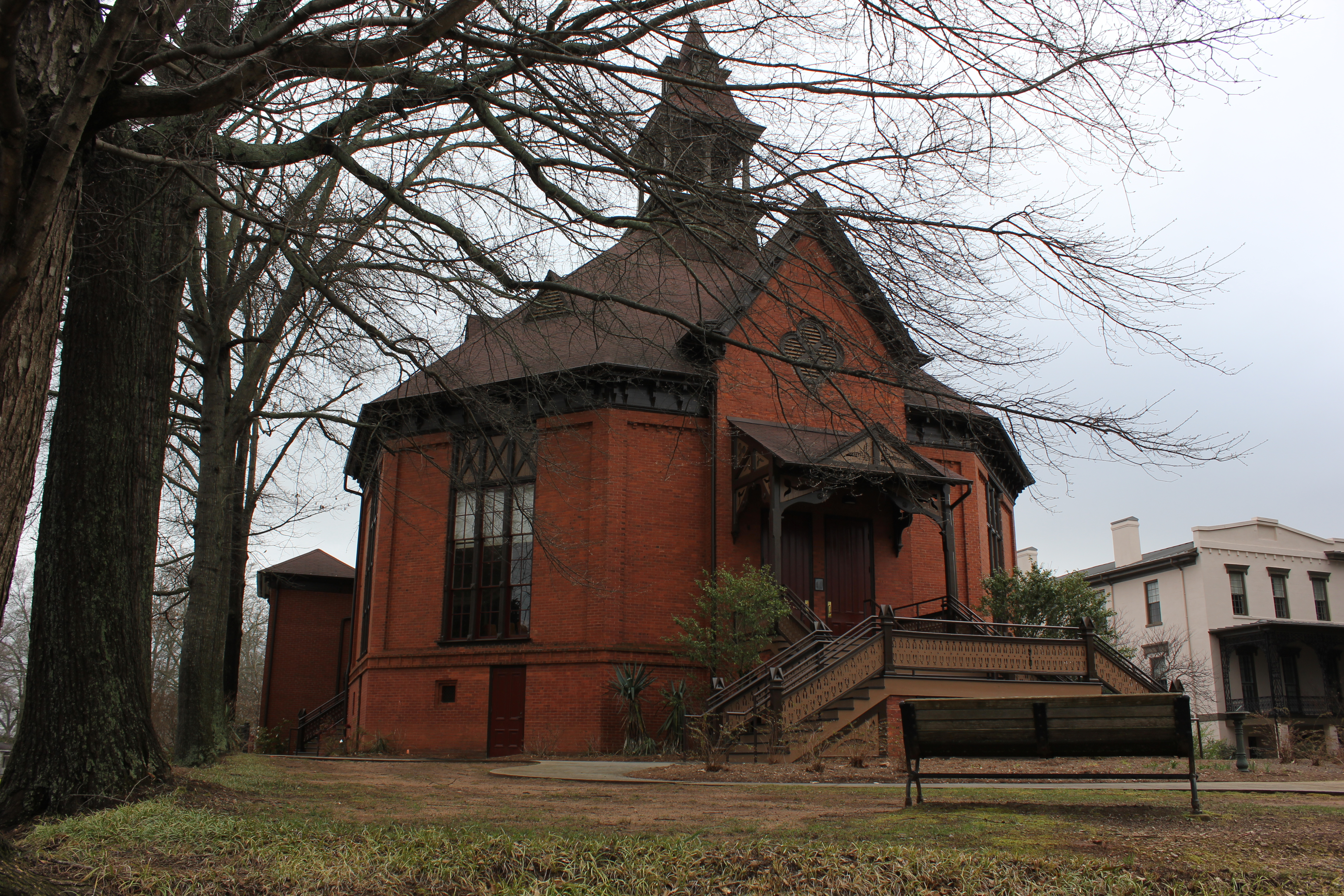
The Seney–Stovall Chapel in Athens, Georgia, was where R.E.M. recorded two songs for the film.

Athens, GA: Inside/Out is a 1986 documentary film about the mid-1980s music scene in Athens, Georgia, United States. The film has been described as "the definitive portrait of the city's world-renowned music scene."

== Synopsis ==
Athens, GA: Inside/Out was the creation of Tony Gayton, a first-time director who recently graduated from the University of Southern California. He was director, writer, and shot the documentary on the film. The film was produced by Bill Cody.

The film features interviews and concert footage of bands who were a part of the Athens music scene at the time, including R.E.M., Pylon, and The B-52s. Other featured bands are the Bar–B–Q Killers, Dreams So Real, Flat Duo Jets, Kilkenny Cats, Limbo District, Love Tractor, The Squalls, and Time Toy.

The documentary also features interviews with folk artists Howard Finster and Rev. John D. Ruth, whose wife plays the pump organ. Athens poet John Seawright reads his work "I Broke My Saw" in the film. William "Ort" Carlton is featured as one of the film's narrators. Another local personality in the film is Walter Rittenberry, owner of Walter's BBQ.

== Production ==
University of Georgia art professor James Herbert, the film's cinematographer, says he selected the film's locations with director Gayton. Herbert says "I pushed for the most interesting visually. Some were appropriate as factual locations the bands played in."

R.E.M. was filmed performing "Swan Song H" and Boudleaux Bryant's "All I Have to Do Is Dream" (mis-titled "Dream (All I Have to Do)" by R.E.M.) at the Seney–Stovall Chapel in Athens. R.E.M. were also filmed performing in the Morton Building at 195 West Washington Street in Athens. The Bar–B–Q Killers, Kilkenny Cats, and Time Toy were filmed performing at the Uptown Lounge on February 4, 1986. Flat Duo Jets were filmed playing on the porch on a fraternity house at the University of Georgia.

Mike Mills of R.E.M. and Mark Cline of Love Tractor were interviewed at Lay Park in Athens. The Bar–B–Q Killers and Walter Rittenberry were interviewed at Walter's BBQ on 1660 West Broad Street in Athens. Ort was filmed at his former house at 274 Trilby Street in Athens.

== Release ==
Athens, GA: Inside/Out premiered at Buckhead Cinema and Drafthouse in Atlanta on November 30, 1986. This was an invitation-only showing for the participants in the film. MTV's The Cutting Edge showed the documentary the same night. It had a limited theatrical run in 1987, mostly playing in major cities.

== Reception and legacy ==
The New York Times called Athens, GA: Inside/Out a "bright, scrappy new documentary" that had "a refreshingly homemade feeling; it's as likably odd and unpretentious as Athens itself." The Washington Post wrote "Gayton's film reflects the energy and the self-made spirit of Athens," and also noted that, "Interviews and performances are skillfully interwoven."

Athens, GA: Inside/Out was named pick of the week video by People magazine in 1988. It was named one of the Top Ten Films about Georgia by the New Georgia Encyclopedia.

Rolling Stone wrote "Athens, GA: Inside/Out…helped bring the town’s music scene to national attention." James Herbert, the film's cinematographer, went on to direct 14 music videos for R.E.M., as well as videos for other Athens bands, including The B-52s.

The film was featured on the first six episodes of MTV's 120 Minutes, which held a contest "Win a Weekend in Athens, GA."

Athens, GA. Inside/Out: Original Soundtrack was released by I.R.S. Records on vinyl and cassette. A single from the soundtrack—The Squalls' "Na Na Na Na" and Flat Duo Jets' "Crazy, Hazy Kisses"—reached number two on the college radio charts. The soundtrack was re-released in 2012. A 21st-century critic noted "The soundtrack to Athens, GA: Inside/Out is a testament to how much of an impact bands from a certain era can have on a particular scene."

On June 18, 2008, AthFest kicked off with a showing of Athens, GA: Inside/Out at Ciné, followed by a panel discussion and question and answer session with ORT, Vanessa Briscoe-Hay and Michael Lachowski of Pylon, Bob Hay of The Squalls, and other cast members. Dexter Romweber of Flat Duo Jets performed a solo set following the session.

In November 2021, the sequel Athens, GA Inside/Out 2: Red Turns Blue, produced by Bill Cody and Tony Brazier was released to streaming.

== See also ==
- Music of Athens, Georgia
- College rock
