= Chomp (album) =

Studio album by Pylon
- Released: 1983
- Genre: New wave; post-punk; jangle pop; alternative rock
- Label: DB
- Producer: Chris Stamey; Gene Holder

Pylon chronology
Gyrate (1980)	Chomp (1983)	Chain (1990)

Chomp is the second studio album by Athens, Georgia band Pylon, released in 1983. It was re-released in 2009 via DFA Records.

== Critical reception ==
Professional ratings
Review scores
Source	Rating
AllMusic	4.5/5 stars
Robert Christgau	A−
The Encyclopedia of Popular Music	4/5 stars
Pitchfork	7.7/10
PopMatters	8/10
The Rolling Stone Album Guide	3.5/5 stars

Trouser Press called the album "more ambitious in scope" than the debut, writing that it "incorporates a psychedelic drone in spots" and that the band "sometimes sounds less anxious and strident than before." The Stranger deemed Chomp an "essential [record] of angsty new wave and piquant post-punk."

== Track listing ==
Side one
No.	Title	Length
1.	"K"	4:33
2.	"Yo-Yo"	4:14
3.	"Beep"	3:24
4.	"Italian Movie Theme"	2:00
5.	"Crazy"	3:13
6.	"M-Train"	3:46

Side two
No.	Title	Length
7.	"Buzz"	2:59
8.	"No Clocks"	2:58
9.	"Reptiles"	3:56
10.	"Spider"	3:54
11.	"Gyrate"	4:06
12.	"Altitude"	3:19

=== Chomp More (2009 reissue – DFA – DFA2220CD) ===
No.	Title	Length
13.	"Crazy" (Original)"	3:12
14.	"Yo-Yo" (Pylon Mix)"	5:53
15.	"Gyrate" (Pylon Mix)"	4:57
16.	"Four Minutes"	6:04

Track 16 is the B-side of "Beep"/"Altitude" single.

== Personnel ==
- Michael Lachowski – bass
- Curtis Crowe – drums
- Randall Bewley – guitar
- Vanessa Briscoe Hay – vocals
