= The Swimming Pool Q's =

American new wave/jangle pop band

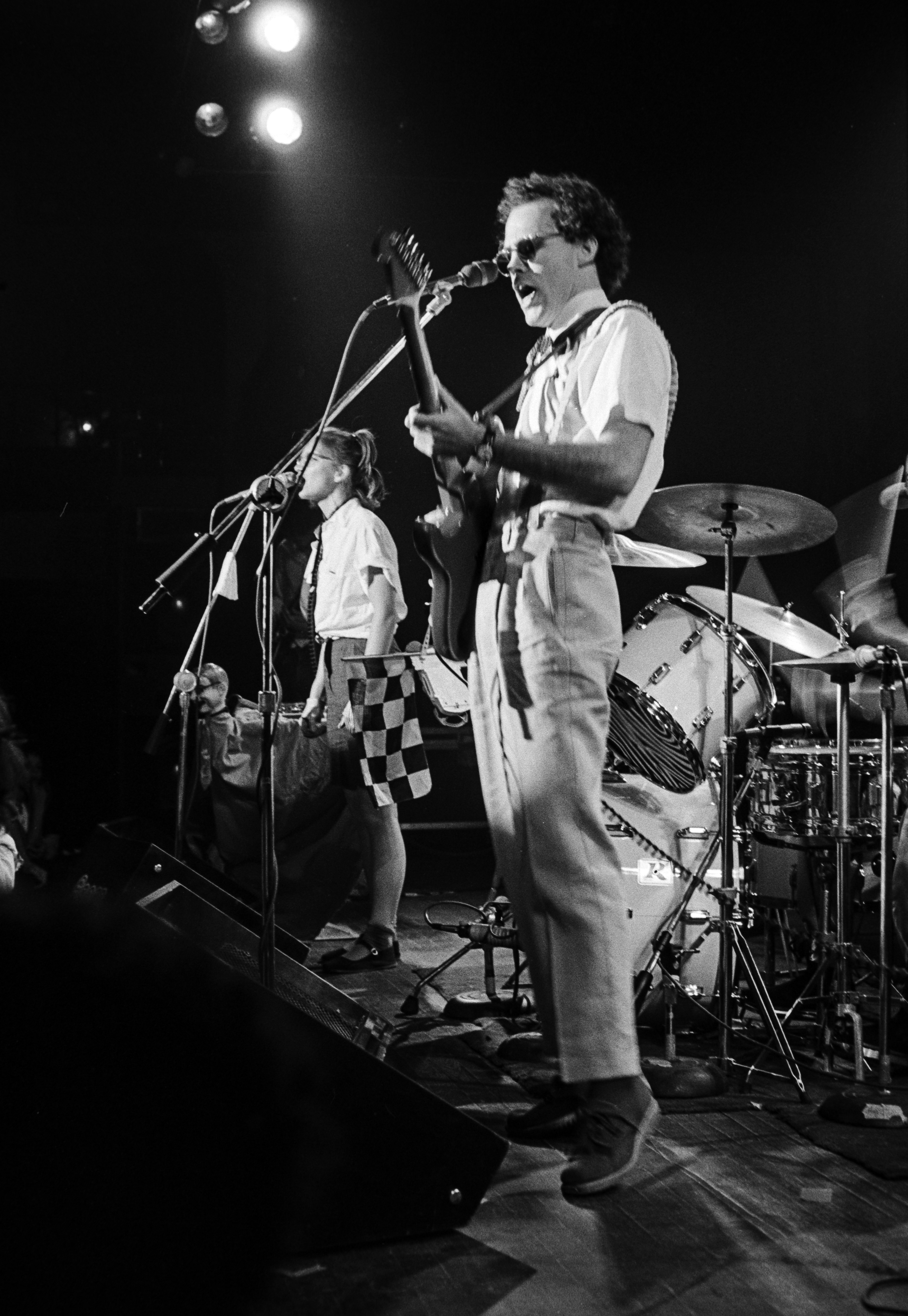
- Jeff Calder and Anne Richmond Boston of the Swimming Pool Q's in 1979

Background information
- Origin: Atlanta, Georgia, United States
- Genres: New wave; jangle pop
- Years active: 1978–1992, 1998-present
- Labels: DB; A&M; Capitol; Bar/None
- Members: Jeff Calder; Bob Elsey; Anne Richmond Boston; Billy Burton; Robert Schmid
- Past members: Billy Jones; Peter Jarkunas; J.E. Garnett; Neill Calabro
- Website: swimmingpoolqs.com

The Swimming Pool Q's are an American new wave and jangle-pop band formed in Atlanta, Georgia in 1978. They released five albums: The Deep End, The Swimming Pool Q's, Blue Tomorrow, World War Two Point Five, and Royal Academy of Reality.

== Formation ==
The band was formed in 1978 by Jeff Calder (vocals, guitar, saxophone, theremin) and Bob Elsey (guitar), who recruited Billy Jones (bass guitar), and Robert Schmid (drums). Vocalist/keyboard player Anne Richmond Boston joined prior to the first single, "Rat Bait", released in 1979 on their own Clorinated label. The single brought them critical praise and they secured support slots with Devo and The Police. Jones left, and was replaced by Peter Jarkunas. They signed to Danny Beard's DB Records and released debut album The Deep End in June 1981, which went on to sell around 20,000 copies. A single for DB, "Little Misfit", was released in 1982.

After two years without a further release, and with Jarkunas and Schmid replaced by J.E. Garnett and Billy Burton, the band returned in 1984 with the single "The Bells Ring" and album The Swimming Pool Q's, now signed to A&M Records. They toured with Lou Reed as support act on his New Sensations tour. A second album for A&M, Blue Tomorrow (1986), failed to meet the label's expectations and the band was dropped.

The Q's then signed to Capitol Records, and released the album World War Two Point Five in 1989. Boston left by this point, but she designed the album sleeve. The band split up in 1992.

Anne Richmond Boston released the album The Big House of Time in 1990, with her then-husband Rob Gal (of The Coolies).

Calder and Elsey continued to play and write together, and Calder played in the band Supreme Court, including on the 1993 album Goes Electric.

== Reunion ==
The band reformed in 1998. That year, Calder contributed to the children's musical audiobook Not Dogs...Too Simple (A Tale of Two Kitties). An expanded version of The Deep End was released in 2001 with thirteen bonus tracks.

In 2003, an ambitious new album titled Royal Academy of Reality was released. A review by Allmusic said:

Anyone who remembers the intelligent, intricate, and idiosyncratic pop of the band's previous work is in for a very big surprise with this album; spreading 20 songs over 70 minutes and recorded with a lush, wide-screen grandeur that puts the group's major-label catalog to shame, much of The Royal Academy of Reality suggests a blend of psychedelia, prog rock, and new age soundscapes as interpreted by a handful of college-educated eccentrics from the deep South.

A Kickstarter project was set up to fund the reissue of the band's two A&M albums, which reached its $15,000 target in September 2012. In June 2013, their two A&M albums were re-released on compact disc in a two-disc edition and three-disc, one DVD deluxe edition under the Bar None Records label.

== Musical style ==
While often categorized as new wave or jangle pop, the band was described as "folk pop gone country" in 1984. An early inspiration was the Hampton Grease Band, and the band were described in 1981 as "Beefheart-influenced". A 1986 review of Blue Tomorrow described the band's sound as "a masterful synthesis of styles".

== Discography ==
=== Albums ===
- The Deep End (1981), DB
- The Swimming Pool Q's (1984), A&M
- Blue Tomorrow (1986), A&M
- World War Two Point Five (1989), Capitol
- Royal Academy of Reality (2003), Bar/None

=== Singles, EPs ===
- "Rat Bait" (1979), Clorinated
- "Little Misfit" (1982), DB
- "The Bells Ring" (1984), A&M
- "Pretty on the Inside" (1986), A&M
- "Now I'm Talking About Now" (1986), A&M
- The Firing Squad for God EP (1987), DB
- "The Common Years" (1989), Capitol - promo only
