= Gyrate (album) =

Studio album by Pylon
- Released: 1980
- Studios: Stone Mountain, Atlanta, Georgia, US
- Genres: New wave; post-punk
- Label: DB
- Producers: Bruce Baxter; Kevin Dunn; Pylon

Pylon chronology
| Gyrate (1980) | Chomp (1983) |

Gyrate is the debut studio album by American rock band Pylon, released in 1980 by record label DB. It has been lauded by music critics both in contemporary and retrospective reviews.

== Critical reception ==
Professional ratings
Review scores
| Source | Rating |
|---|---|
| AllMusic | 4.5/5 stars |
| Pitchfork | 8.8/10 |
| Record Mirror | 4/5 stars |
| Rolling Stone | 4/5 stars |
| Tiny Mix Tapes | 4/5 marks |

In a 1980 review in Record Mirror, Alan Entwistle wrote, "The sound is full of raw, soulful spirit," and added, "Creative drumming and pulsing bass lending themselves perfectly to melodic guitar bursts, and providing an intense, glowing backdrop to singer Vanessa Ellison's often lurid vocals." In a 1981 Trouser Press review, Jon Young noted the album had "forceful rhythms and a kooky aura...jagged broken-glass textures and earnestly overbearing lyrics." He said the band has a "nervous, paranoid vibe," similar to the early Talking Heads. Young concludes, "Pylon prods and prods and prods."

== Track listing ==
- All songs written and arranged by Pylon, except where noted (Current Copyright: Pylon Music Two / Administered by BMG Bumblebee (BMI)

Side A

1. "Volume" – 4:10
2. "Feast on My Heart" – 3:28 (Pylon, with additional lyrics by Craig Woodall)
3. "Precaution" – 2:45
4. "Weather Radio" – 2:08
5. "The Human Body" – 3:00
6. "Read a Book" – 1:55

Side B

1. "Driving School" – 3:47†
2. "Gravity" – 2:31
3. "Danger" – 5:32
4. "Working Is No Problem" – 3:24
5. "Stop It" – 2:59

† The original DB Records pressing of the LP in 1980 opened with the tune "Driving School" on Side B; The 1988 DB Records reissue removed the song, replacing it with "Recent Title". Later reissue versions, such as the CD below, featured both tunes.

Gyrate Plus – 2007 reissue

1. "Cool" – 3:21
2. "Dub" – 4:42
3. "Volume" – 4:17
4. "Feast on My Heart" – 3:34
5. "Precaution" – 2:52
6. "Weather Radio" – 2:15
7. "Human Body" – 3:07
8. "Read a Book" – 2:00
9. "Driving School" – 3:54
10. "Recent Title" – 2:27
11. "Gravity" – 2:39
12. "Danger" – 5:39
13. "Working Is No Problem" – 3:32
14. "Stop It" – 3:05
15. "Danger!!" – 5:40
16. "Functionality" – 4:29
- Tracks 1 and 2 are from the "Cool"/"Dub" single released in 1979; tracks 3 to 14 from Gyrate; track 15 from 10-inch 45 RPM released in UK and as a 12-inch EP in the US and Italy in 1980; track 16 is a studio demo previously unreleased.

Gyrate (Remastered) – 2020 reissue
Side A

1. ”Volume” – 4:10
2. ”Feast” – On My Heart 3:28
3. ”Precaution” – 2:45
4. ”Weather Radio” – 2:08
5. ”The Human Body” – 3:00
6. ”Read A Book” – 1:55

Side B

1. ”Driving School” – 3:47
2. ”Gravity” – 2:31
3. ”Danger” – 5:32
4. ”Working Is No Problem” – 3:24
5. ”Stop It” – 2:59
- Remastered from the original tapes and reissued by New West Records in 2020 on vinyl, CD and digital. Also, part of ‘Box’— a definitive Boxset of Pylon’s early output.

== Personnel ==
- Vanessa Ellison – vocals
- Randy Bewley – guitar
- Michael Lachowski – bass
- Curtis Crowe – drums
