= The Glands =

American indie rock band

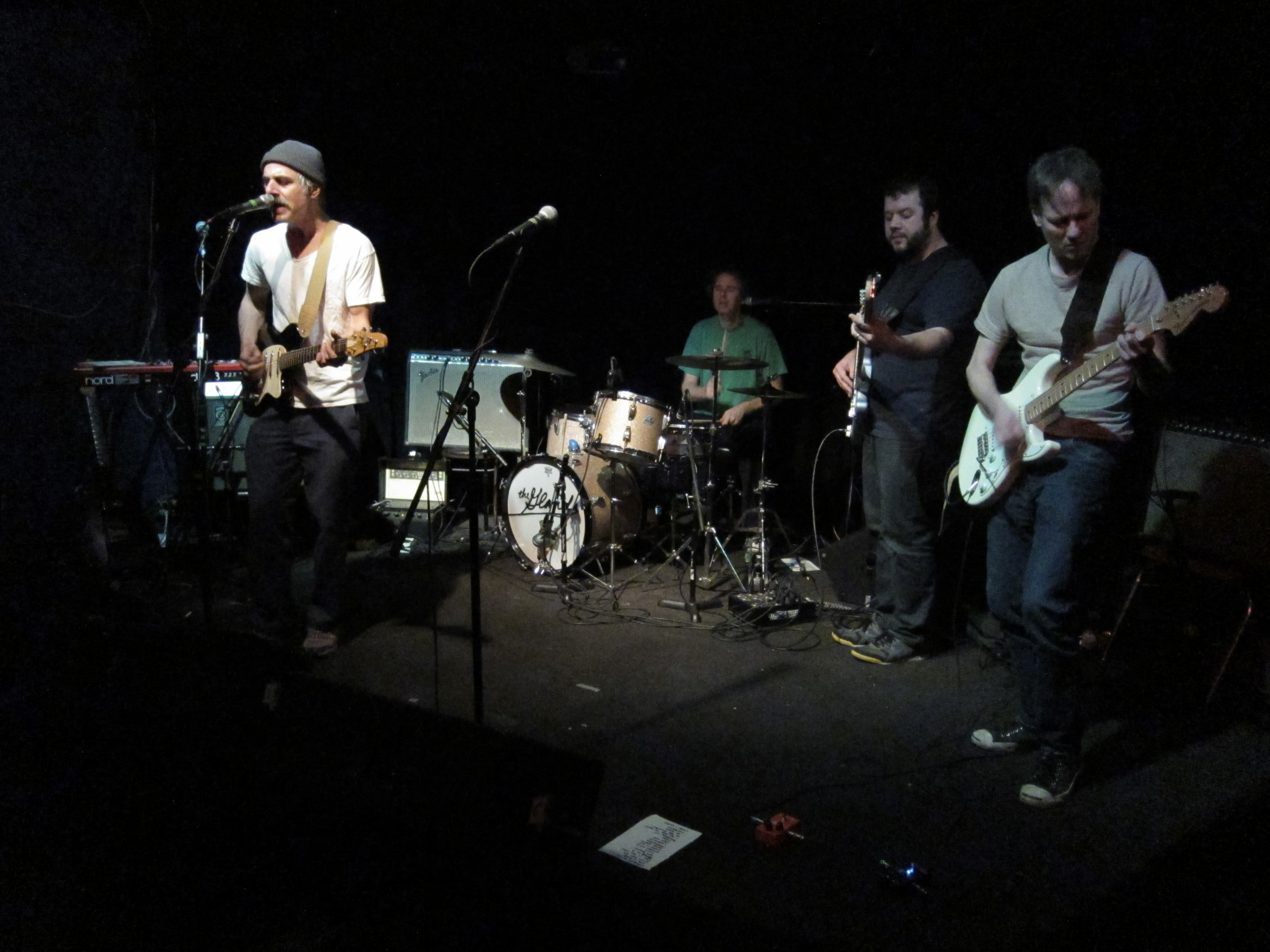
- The Glands at performing at Black Cat in Washington, D.C., US in 2011

Background information
- Origin: Athens, Georgia, United States
- Genres: Indie rock
- Labels: Bar/None Records, Capricorn Records, Velocette Records, New West Records
- Past members: Ross Shapiro; Doug Stanley; Joe Rowe; Craig McQuiston; Derek Almstead

The Glands were an American indie rock band from Athens, Georgia, United States. Their first CD, Double Thriller, was self-released in 1996 and reissued on Bar/None Records in 1998. Their self-titled album was first released in August 2000 on Capricorn Records and reissued on Velocette Records in August 2001. Their third and final studio album Double Coda was released on New West Records in November 2018.

== Overview ==
The Glands' unique sounds recalled a variety of influences, including the Kinks, the Who, and The Rolling Stones. The song "Livin' Was Easy" was featured in the DVD Let America Laugh by comedian David Cross. The band reunited for a brief east coast tour in late 2011, playing several dates with Yo La Tengo.

Ross Shapiro, singer, guitarist, and founding member of The Glands, died in March 2016 aged 53 of lung cancer.

== Discography ==
- Double Thriller, Self-released (1996) / Bar/None Records (1998)
- The Glands, Capricorn Records (2000) / Velocette Records (2001)
- Double Coda, New West Records (2018)
