= Chain (Pylon album) =

Studio album by Pylon
- Released: 1990
- Recorded: Tracks 1–3 and 5–13 recorded July 1990; "Sugarpop" recorded February 1990
- Studio: Reflection; John Keane
- Genre: Dance-punk, jangle rock
- Label: Sky 7-2020-1
- Producer: Gary Smith, Scott Litt

Pylon chronology
Chomp (1983)	Chain (1990)	Pylon Live (2016)

Chain is the third studio album by the American rock band Pylon, released in 1990. It was released after a seven-year hiatus. R.E.M. had lobbied the band to record again, suggesting that Pylon could use R.E.M.'s practice space.

== Critical reception ==
Professional ratings
Review scores
Source	Rating
AllMusic	3/5 stars
Robert Christgau	A−
The Encyclopedia of Popular Music	3/5 stars
The Rolling Stone Album Guide	2.5/5 stars

Robert Christgau thought that Pylon's "low registers, deliberate silences, and inexorably unmechanical beat all feed a muscular musical solidity with no real parallels—10 years after, the only band that sounds remotely similar is the Gang of Four." Trouser Press wrote: "While retaining the band's traditional bite, Chain gets more melody and texture from [Vanessa] Briscoe-Hay's singing and Randy Bewley's sharp guitar jabs." Newsday noted the "monomaniacal infatuation with thick bass notes and a steady, pneumatic beat." The Washington Post determined that "there's still plenty of bounce in the band's sleek, steel-springed sound."

== Track listing ==
- All songs written and arranged by Pylon.
1. "Look Alive" – 4:19
2. "Catch" – 3:37
3. "B-Complex" – 2:25
4. "Sugarpop" – 3:25
5. "There It Is" – 3:32
6. "Springtime" – 3:38
7. "This / That" – 3:02
8. "Go" – 3:57
9. "Crunch" – 3:39
10. "Very Right" – 3:49
11. "Metal" – 2:50
12. "Outside" – 2:47
13. "Sloganistic" – 2:36

== Personnel ==
- Vanessa Ellison – vocals
- Randy Bewley – guitars
- Michael Lachowski – bass
- Curtis Crowe – drums
