= DB Records =

US record label

DB Records (stylized as DB RECS) was a record label owned by Danny Beard, active from 1978 to 1997. The label was operated out of the Wax'n'Facts record store in the Atlanta, Georgia neighborhood of Little Five Points. Through the 1980s, the label became known as a source of southern regional music.

== History ==
In 1978, Beard helped some friends in The B-52's by recording and releasing their first single, "Rock Lobster", produced by Kevin Dunn. The record sold nearly 20,000 copies.

"It was a great record and a great group," Beard told reporter Jim McConnell, "and it fooled me into thinking that having a record label was easy."

Beard also recorded and helped other local and regional musicians. DB's roster went on to include The Coolies, Fetchin Bones, Guadalcanal Diary, The Jody Grind, Love Tractor, Oh-OK, Pylon, Chris Stamey, The Swimming Pool Q's, Uncle Green, and Zeitgeist (later known as The Reivers), among others. Beard also financed and recorded Pylon's groundbreaking first single, "Cool"/"Dub", which was released on the Athens-based Caution Records label in 1979.

Many of the bands on the label also performed live at Atlanta's 688 Club, a popular venue for alternative bands.

== See also ==
- List of record labels
