= The B-52s discography =

This is the discography and videography of American rock band the B-52s. (Note: Originally presented as The B-52's, with a plural apostrophe, until 2008.)

== Albums ==
=== Studio albums ===
Title	Details	Peak chart positions										Certifications
Title	Details	US	AUS	BEL	CAN	GER	NED	NZ	SWE	SWI	UK	Certifications
The B-52's	Released: July 6, 1979; Label: Warner Bros.	59	7	—	14	—	—	3	—	—	22	RIAA: Platinum; ARIA: 2× Platinum; MC: Gold; RMNZ: Platinum
Wild Planet	Released: August 27, 1980; Label: Warner Bros.	18	12	—	32	—	—	3	—	—	18	RIAA: Gold
Whammy!	Released: April 27, 1983; Label: Warner Bros.	29	97	—	—	40	—	42	29	—	33	RIAA: Gold
Bouncing Off the Satellites	Released: September 8, 1986; Label: Warner Bros.	85	73	—	—	—	—	50	—	—	74	
Cosmic Thing	Released: June 27, 1989; Label: Reprise	4	1	152	8	25	70	1	38	—	8	RIAA: 4× Platinum; ARIA: 2× Platinum; BPI: Platinum; MC: Platinum; RMNZ: Platinum
Good Stuff	Released: June 23, 1992; Label: Reprise	16	36	—	21	22	45	14	36	26	8	RIAA: Gold; BPI: Silver
Funplex	Released: March 25, 2008; Label: Astralwerks	11	93	67	—	38	—	—	—	71	73	
"—" denotes items that did not chart or were not released in that territory.

=== Compilation albums ===
Title	Details	Peak chart positions					Certifications
Title	Details	US	AUS	NZ	SWE	UK	Certifications
Party Mix!	Released: July 1981; Label: Warner Bros.	55	80	—	23	36	
The Best of the B-52's – Dance This Mess Around	Released: July 1990; Label: Island	—	—	—	—	36	BPI: Silver
Party Mix! – Mesopotamia	Released: February 1991; Label: Reprise	184	—	—	—	—	
Planet Claire	Release: 1995; Label: Spectrum Music	—	—	—	—	—	
Time Capsule: Songs for a Future Generation	Released: May 26, 1998; Label: Reprise	93	40	15	—	—	ARIA: Platinum; BPI: Silver; RMNZ: Gold
Nude on the Moon: The B-52's Anthology	Released: January 15, 2002; Label: Rhino	136	—	—	—	—	
"—" denotes items that did not chart or were not released in that territory.

=== Live albums ===
Title	Details
With the Wild Crowd! Live in Athens, GA	Released: October 10, 2011; Label: Eagle
Live! 8-24-1979	Released: April 21, 2015; Label: Rhino
Live! Rock 'N Rockets 1998	Released: April 21, 2018; Label: Mountain Man Music

== Box sets ==
Title	Details
The Warner and Reprise Years	Released: June 20, 2025; Label: Rhino; 8×CD, 9×LP

== Extended plays ==
Title	Details	Peak chart positions					
Title	Details	US	AUS	CAN	NED	SWE	UK
Mesopotamia	Released: January 27, 1982; Label: Warner Bros.	35	79	38	29	21	18

== Singles ==
Year	Title	Peak chart positions										Certifications	Album
Year	Title	US	AUS	BEL	CAN	FRA	GER	IRE	NED	NZ	UK	Certifications	Album
1978	"Rock Lobster"	56	3	—	1	—	—	—	—	38	37		The B-52's
1979	"Planet Claire"	—	43	—	—	—	—	—	—	35	—		The B-52's
1979	"Dance This Mess Around"	—	—	—	—	—	—	—	—	—	—		The B-52's
1980	"Private Idaho"	74	11	—	—	—	—	—	—	—	—		Wild Planet
1980	"Give Me Back My Man"	—	—	—	—	59	—	—	—	—	61		Wild Planet
1980	"Party Out of Bounds"	—	—	—	—	—	—	—	—	—	—		Wild Planet
1981	"Give Me Back My Man" (Remix)	—	—	—	—	—	—	—	—	—	—		Party Mix!
1982	"Deep Sleep"	—	—	—	—	—	—	—	—	—	—		Mesopotamia
1982	"Mesopotamia"	—	—	—	—	—	—	—	—	—	—		Mesopotamia
1983	"Legal Tender"	81	—	—	—	—	—	—	—	—	—		Whammy!
1983	"Whammy Kiss"	—	—	—	—	—	—	—	—	—	—		Whammy!
1983	"Song for a Future Generation"	—	—	—	—	—	—	—	—	—	63		Whammy!
1986	"Rock Lobster/Planet Claire" (European re-release)	—	—	—	—	—	—	20	—	—	12		The B-52's
1986	"Summer of Love"	—	90	—	—	—	—	—	—	35	—		Bouncing off the Satellites
1986	"Girl from Ipanema Goes to Greenland"	—	—	—	—	—	—	—	—	—	—		Bouncing off the Satellites
1987	"Wig"	—	—	—	—	—	—	—	—	—	79		Bouncing off the Satellites
1989	"Channel Z"	—	145	43	—	—	—	—	—	—	—		Cosmic Thing
1989	"Love Shack"	3	1	12	5	42	—	1	15	1	2	RIAA: 3× Platinum; ARIA: 2× Platinum; BPI: Platinum	Cosmic Thing
1990	"Roam"	3	11	—	4	—	40	9	—	2	17	RIAA: Gold; ARIA: Gold	Cosmic Thing
1990	"Deadbeat Club"	30	73	—	35	—	—	—	—	21	—		Cosmic Thing
1990	"Channel Z" (re-release)	—	—	—	—	—	—	—	—	—	61		Cosmic Thing
1992	"Good Stuff"	28	56	25	24	—	37	26	28	23	21		Good Stuff
1992	"Is That You Mo-Dean?"	—	—	—	—	—	—	—	—	—	78		Good Stuff
1992	"Tell It Like It T-I-Is"	—	120	—	—	—	—	—	—	—	61		Good Stuff
1993	"Revolution Earth"	—	146	—	—	—	—	—	—	—	—		Good Stuff
1993	"Hot Pants Explosion"	—	—	—	—	—	—	—	—	—	78		Good Stuff
1994	"(Meet) The Flintstones"	33	54	2	19	—	9	5	5	15	3	BPI: Silver; RMNZ: Gold	The Flintstones: Music From Bedrock
1998	"Debbie"	—	—	—	—	—	—	—	—	—	—		Time Capsule: Songs for a Future Generation
1999	"Love Shack" (The B-52's vs. DJ Tonka)	—	112	—	—	—	—	—	—	—	66		Non-album single
2008	"Funplex"	—	—	—	—	—	—	—	—	—	—		Funplex
2008	"Juliet of the Spirits"	—	—	—	—	—	—	—	—	—	—		Funplex
"—" denotes items that did not chart or were not released in that territory.

=== Promo singles ===
Year	Title	Peak chart positions	Album
Year	Title	US Mod	Album
1982	"Loveland"	—	Mesopotamia
1982	"Cake"	—	Mesopotamia
1989	"(Shake That) Cosmic Thing"	7	Cosmic Thing

== Other appearances ==
List of non-single songs by the B-52's from non-B-52's releases, showing year released and album name
Title	Year	Album
"Quiche Lorraine" (Live)	1991	Tame Yourself
"The Bedrock Twitch" (as The BC-52's)	1994	The Flintstones: Music From Bedrock
"The Chosen One"	2000	Pokémon 2000: The Power Of One (Music From And Inspired By The Motion Picture)
"Glove Slap"	2007	The Simpsons: Testify
"Music City Queen" (with Miranda Lambert)	2022	Palomino

== Video ==
=== Music videos ===
Year	Song	Director
1979	"Rock Lobster" (studio performance video)	Charles Libin & Paul Cameron
1980	"Private Idaho"	
1980	"Give Me Back My Man"	
1983	"Legal Tender"	Mick Haggerty & C.D. Taylor
1983	"Song for a Future Generation"	
1984	"Monster"	
1986	"Rock Lobster" (conceptual video)	
1986	"Girl from Ipanema Goes to Greenland"	Paul Tassie
1986	"Planet Claire"	
1989	"Channel Z"	Drew Carolan
1989	"Love Shack"	Adam Bernstein
1990	"Roam"	Adam Bernstein
1990	"Deadbeat Club"	Jeff Preiss
1990	"(Shake That) Cosmic Thing" (Live 1990)	
1992	"Good Stuff"	Marcus Nispel
1992	"Is That You Mo-Dean?"	
1992	"Tell It Like It T-I-Is"	
1993	"Revolution Earth"	James Herbert
1993	"Hot Pants Explosion"	
1994	"(Meet) The Flintstones"	
1998	"Debbie"	Ramaa Mosley
2008	"Funplex"	Robert Schober
2008	"Juliet of the Spirits"	

=== Video albums ===
- The B-52's 1979–1989 (1989) VHS. (Certified Platinum by the RIAA)
- The B-52's Time Capsule: Videos for a Future Generation 1979–1998 (1998) VHS & LaserDisc. Also released on DVD as part of the Australian ‘Special CD+DVD’ edition of Time Capsule: Songs For A Future Generation released in 2009
- With the Wild Crowd! Live in Athens, GA (2012) DVD & Blu-ray.
