= Nude on the Moon: The B-52's Anthology =

Compilation album by the B-52's
- Released: January 15, 2002
- Genre: New wave; dance-rock
- Length: 2:36:49
- Label: Warner Brothers, Rhino
- Producer: Chris Blackwell, Rhett Davies, the B-52's, David Byrne, Steven Stanley, Tony Mansfield, Shep Pettibone, Nile Rodgers, Don Was, Moby, Tom Durack

The B-52's chronology
Time Capsule: Songs for a Future Generation (1998)	Nude on the Moon: The B-52's Anthology (2002)	Funplex (2008)

Professional ratings
Review scores
Source	Rating
AllMusic	3/5 stars

Nude on the Moon: The B-52's Anthology is a two-CD compilation by the American new wave band the B-52's, released in 2002 by Rhino Records. The compilation includes songs recorded between the years 1979 and 1998 and includes live recordings of "Quiche Lorraine" and "Whammy Kiss" and a previously unreleased outtake version of "Queen of Las Vegas". The title is a reference to the 1961 film Nude on the Moon.

== Track listing ==
All tracks are written by Kate Pierson, Fred Schneider, Keith Strickland, Cindy Wilson, Ricky Wilson, except where noted.

Disc one
No.	Title	Writer(s)	Original release	Length
1.	"52 Girls"	Jeremy Ayers, R. Wilson	The B-52's (1979)	3:34
2.	"Dance This Mess Around"		The B-52's	4:36
3.	"Rock Lobster"	Schneider, R. Wilson	The B-52's	6:49
4.	"Lava"		The B-52's	4:54
5.	"Hero Worship"	Robert Waldrop, R. Wilson	The B-52's	4:07
6.	"Planet Claire"	Schneider, Strickland, Henry Mancini	The B-52's	4:35
7.	"Give Me Back My Man"	Schneider, Strickland, C. Wilson, R. Wilson	Wild Planet (1980)	4:00
8.	"Private Idaho"		Wild Planet	3:35
9.	"Devil in My Car"	Pierson, Schneider, C. Wilson, R. Wilson	Wild Planet	4:28
10.	"Party Out of Bounds"		Wild Planet	3:21
11.	"Strobe Light"	The B-52's	Wild Planet	3:59
12.	"Quiche Lorraine" (Live, 1990)	Schneider, Strickland, R. Wilson	Tame Yourself (1991) various artists compilation; original version from Wild Planet	3:58
13.	"Mesopotamia" (1990 Remix)	Pierson, Strickland, Schneider, R. Wilson	Party Mix!/Mesopotamia (1990); original mix from Mesopotamia	3:51
14.	"Queen of Las Vegas" (Mesopotamia Outtake Version)		Previously unreleased; rerecorded for Whammy! (1983)	5:40
15.	"Legal Tender"	Pierson, Schneider, Strickland, C. Wilson, R. Wilson, Waldrop	Whammy!	3:40
16.	"Song for a Future Generation"		Whammy!	4:00
17.	"Trism"		Whammy!	3:23
18.	"Whammy Kiss" (Live, 1989)		Roam UK single (1990); original version from Whammy!	3:59

All tracks are written by Pierson, Schneider, Strickland, C. Wilson, except where noted.

Disc two
No.	Title	Writer(s)	Original release	Length
1.	"Summer of Love"	Pierson, Strickland, C. Wilson, R. Wilson	Bouncing Off the Satellites (1986)	4:02
2.	"Ain't It a Shame" (New Edit)	Strickland, C. Wilson, R. Wilson	Bouncing Off the Satellites	4:33
3.	"Theme for a Nude Beach" (New Edit)	Pierson, Schneider, Strickland, C. Wilson, R. Wilson	Bouncing Off the Satellites	4:24
4.	"Girl from Ipanema Goes to Greenland"	Strickland, C. Wilson, R. Wilson	Bouncing Off the Satellites	4:22
5.	"Wig"	Pierson, Schneider, Strickland, C. Wilson, R. Wilson	Bouncing Off the Satellites	4:22
6.	"She Brakes for Rainbows"	Strickland, R. Wilson	Bouncing Off the Satellites	4:41
7.	"Cosmic Thing"		Cosmic Thing (1989)	3:50
8.	"Deadbeat Club"		Cosmic Thing	4:45
9.	"Love Shack"		Cosmic Thing	5:21
10.	"Roam"	Pierson, Schneider, Strickland, C. Wilson, Waldrop	Cosmic Thing	4:54
11.	"Channel Z"		Cosmic Thing	4:49
12.	"Junebug"		Cosmic Thing	5:04
13.	"Follow Your Bliss"	Strickland	Cosmic Thing	4:08
14.	"Good Stuff"	Pierson, Schneider, Strickland	Good Stuff (1992)	5:58
15.	"Revolution Earth"	Pierson, Strickland, Waldrop	Good Stuff	5:50
16.	"Is That You Mo-Dean?" (Interdimension Mix, New Edit)	Pierson, Schneider, Strickland	"Revolution Earth"/"Is That You Mo-Dean?" US single (1992); original mix from Good Stuff	4:38
17.	"Debbie"		Time Capsule: Songs for a Future Generation (1998)	3:32

== Personnel ==
Credits adapted from CD liner notes.

The B-52's

- Kate Pierson – vocals, keyboards, keyboard bass, guitar, bird calls
- Fred Schneider – vocals, keyboard bass, toy piano, percussion, walkie talkie
- Keith Strickland – vocals, guitars, keyboards, keyboard bass, bass, sitar, harmonica, marimba, drums, percussion, programming, Claire sounds
- Cindy Wilson – vocals, bongos, tambourine, guitar
- Ricky Wilson – vocals, guitar, keyboards, keyboard bass, bass, smoke alarm

Additional musicians

- Pat Irwin – guitar, keyboards (disc 1, tracks 12, 18; disc 2, tracks 14, 17)
- Tracy Wormworth – bass (disc 1, track 12; disc 2, track 15)
- Zachary Alford – drums (disc 1, tracks 12, 18; disc 2, track 14)
- David Byrne – guitar (disc 1, track 13)
- Steve Scales – percussion (disc 1, tracks 13, 14)
- Yogi Horton – drums (disc 1, track 14)
- Sara Lee – bass, keyboards, backing vocals (disc 1, track 18; disc 2, tracks 7–14, 17)
- Richard Hilton – keyboards (disc 2, tracks 7, 8, 10, 13, 15), programming (disc 2, tracks 7, 8, 10, 13)
- Tommy Mandel – keyboards (disc 2, tracks 7, 8, 10, 13)
- Philippe Saisse – keyboards (disc 2, tracks 7, 8, 10, 13)
- Leroy Clouden – drums (disc 2, tracks 7, 8, 10, 13)
- Sonny Emory – drums (disc 2, tracks 7, 8, 10, 13)
- Steve Ferrone – drums (disc 2, tracks 7, 8, 10, 13)
- Jamie Muhoberac – keyboards (disc 2, track 14)
- Charley Drayton – drums (disc 2, tracks 9, 11, 12, 17)
- Uptown Horns – horns (disc 2, tracks 9, 11, 12)
- Lenny Castro – percussion (disc 2, track 14)
- David McMurray – sax (disc 2, track 14)
- Sterling Campbell – drums (disc 2, track 15)

Technical

- Chris Blackwell – producer (disc 1, tracks 1–6)
- Robert Ash – engineer (disc 1, tracks 1–6)
- Rhett Davies – co-producer (disc 1, tracks 7–11), engineer (disc 1, tracks 7–11)
- Tom Durack – engineer (disc 1, track 12; disc 2, tracks 7, 8, 10, 13, 18), mixer (disc 1, track 13; disc 2, tracks 7–13, 16, 18), co-producer (disc 2, track 17)
- David Byrne – producer (disc 1, tracks 13–14)
- Butch Jones – engineer (disc 1, tracks 13–14)
- Steven Stanley – producer, engineer (disc 1, tracks 15–17)
- The B-52's – producer (disc 1, track 18), co-producer (disc 2, track 17)
- Tony Mansfield – producer (disc 2, tracks 1–6)
- Tony Phillips – engineer (disc 2, tracks 1–6)
- Steve Peck – engineer (disc 2, tracks 1–6)
- Michael Hutchinson – engineer (disc 2, tracks 1–6)
- Shep Pettibone – additional production (disc 2, tracks 1, 4), remixing (disc 2, track 1)
- Nile Rodgers – producer (disc 2, tracks 7, 8, 10, 13), mixing (disc 2, tracks 7, 8, 10, 13)
- Don Was – producer (disc 2, tracks 9, 11, 12, 16)
- Dave Cook – engineer (disc 2, tracks 9, 11, 12)
- Ed Cherney – mixing (disc 2, track 16)
- Moby – remixing, additional production (disc 2, track 16)
- Patrick Dillett – engineer, mixing (disc 2, track 18)
- Bradford Cobb – compilation producer
- Gary Stewart – compilation producer
- Bill Inglot – sound producer, remastering
- Dan Hersch – remastering
- Reggie Collins – discographical annotation
- Shawn Amos – liner notes
- Leigh Hall – liner notes
- Julie Vlasak – art direction/design
- Hugh Brown – art direction/design
- Lynn Goldsmith – cover photos
