= Time Capsule: Songs for a Future Generation =

Greatest hits album by the B-52's
- Released: May 26, 1998
- Recorded: 1979–1998
- Genre: New wave; post-punk; synth-pop; pop rock
- Length: 79:22
- Label: Reprise
- Producer: The B-52's; Chris Blackwell; Rhett Davies; David Byrne; Steven Stanley; Tony Mansfield; Don Was; Nile Rodgers

The B-52's chronology
Good Stuff (1992)	Time Capsule: Songs for a Future Generation (1998)	Nude on the Moon: The B-52's Anthology (2002)

Singles from Time Capsule
- 1. "Debbie" Released: 1998

Professional ratings
Review scores
Source	Rating
AllMusic	4.5/5 stars
Robert Christgau	A

Time Capsule: Songs for a Future Generation is a greatest hits album by American new wave band the B-52's, released in 1998. The album presents sixteen of their single releases and fan-favorite album tracks in chronological order, with the addition of two new songs recorded exclusively for this collection.

== Background ==
The album includes sixteen previously released as well as two new songs, "Hallucinating Pluto" and "Debbie". The latter is a tribute to Debbie Harry of Blondie. Also exclusive to this release is the "Original Unreleased Mix" of their 1986 song "Summer of Love".

The album cover features the five founding band members standing in front of the Unisphere steel structure in Queens, New York.

Singer Cindy Wilson, who had been absent for several years, made her return to recording with the group on this album, and shared songwriting credits on the two new tracks. As noted in the book The B-52's Universe, the band intended this to be a larger box set consisting of singles, demos, outtakes, and new tracks, but Warner made the band condense the tracklist to a single disc.

== Release ==
The US release was encoded as an HDCD.

Editions released in Europe, Japan and Brazil had a different track listing to the US release. In Europe and Japan the album was shortened to 15 tracks, "Quiche Lorraine" being substituted with a live version, which previously appeared on the charity record Tame Yourself, and adding "(Meet) The Flintstones". The Brazilian edition was based on the European one: it omitted track two "52 Girls" and added "Legal Tender" as track eight instead.

"Debbie" was released as a single, and several remix-focused discs were put out as well: Time Capsule: The Remixes in Japan, and "Summer of Love '98" and "Hallucinating Pluto" in the US branded as Time Capsule: The Mixes discs.

A video compilation consisting of twelve of the band's music videos, titled Time Capsule: Videos for a Future Generation 1979–1998, was also released on VHS.

In 2009 the album was reissued in Australia based on the international edition CD, but with new changes, and packed with a DVD reissue of Time Capsule: Videos for a Future Generation 1979–1998. The CD replaced "Debbie" with "Give Me Back My Man".

== Reception ==
The album spent 11 weeks on the U.S. Billboard album charts and reached its peak position of number 93 in June 1998.

== Track listing ==
North American edition
No.	Title	Writer(s)	Origin	Length
1.	"Planet Claire"	Henry Mancini; Fred Schneider; Keith Strickland	The B-52's, 1979	4:36
2.	"52 Girls"	Jeremy Ayers; Ricky Wilson	The B-52's	3:35
3.	"Rock Lobster" (single edit)	Schneider; R. Wilson	The B-52's	4:54
4.	"Party Out of Bounds"	Kate Pierson; Schneider; Strickland; Cindy Wilson; R. Wilson	Wild Planet, 1980	3:21
5.	"Strobe Light"	Schneider; Strickland; R. Wilson	Wild Planet	4:00
6.	"Private Idaho"	Pierson; Schneider; Strickland; C. Wilson; R. Wilson	Wild Planet	3:34
7.	"Quiche Lorraine"	Schneider; Strickland; R. Wilson	Wild Planet	3:58
8.	"Mesopotamia" (1990 remix)	Pierson; Schneider; Strickland; R. Wilson	Mesopotamia, 1982	3:50
9.	"Song for a Future Generation"	Pierson; Schneider; Strickland; C. Wilson; R. Wilson	Whammy!, 1983	3:59
10.	"Summer of Love" (original unreleased mix)	Pierson; Strickland; R. Wilson; C. Wilson	Bouncing Off the Satellites, 1986	4:35
11.	"Channel Z"	Pierson; Schneider; Strickland; C. Wilson	Cosmic Thing, 1989	4:50
12.	"Deadbeat Club"	Pierson; Schneider; Strickland; C. Wilson	Cosmic Thing	4:54
13.	"Love Shack"	Pierson; Schneider; Strickland; C. Wilson	Cosmic Thing	5:22
14.	"Roam"	Pierson; Schneider; Strickland; Robert Waldrop; C. Wilson	Cosmic Thing	4:52
15.	"Good Stuff"	Pierson; Schneider; Strickland	Good Stuff, 1992	5:55
16.	"Is That You Mo-Dean?" (edit)	Pierson; Schneider; Strickland	Good Stuff	5:07
17.	"Debbie"	Pierson; Schneider; Strickland; C. Wilson	Previously unreleased, 1998	3:34
18.	"Hallucinating Pluto"	Pierson; Schneider; Strickland; C. Wilson	Previously unreleased, 1998	4:19

Brazilian edition
No.	Title	Writer(s)	Origin	Length
1.	"Planet Claire"	Mancini; Schneider; Strickland	The B-52's	4:36
2.	"Rock Lobster" (single edit)	Schneider; R. Wilson	The B-52's	4:54
3.	"Party Out of Bounds"	Pierson; Schneider; Strickland; C. Wilson; R. Wilson	Wild Planet	3:21
4.	"Strobe Light"	Schneider; Strickland; R. Wilson	Wild Planet	4:00
5.	"Private Idaho"	Pierson; Schneider; Strickland; C. Wilson; R. Wilson	Wild Planet	3:34
6.	"Quiche Lorraine"	Schneider; Strickland; R. Wilson	Wild Planet	3:58
7.	"Mesopotamia" (1990 remix)	Pierson; Schneider; Strickland; R. Wilson	Mesopotamia	3:50
8.	"Legal Tender"	Pierson; Schneider; Strickland; Waldrop; C. Wilson; R. Wilson	Whammy!	3:41
9.	"Song for a Future Generation"	Pierson; Schneider; Strickland; C. Wilson; R. Wilson	Whammy!	3:59
10.	"Summer of Love" (original unreleased mix)	Pierson; Strickland; R. Wilson; C. Wilson	Bouncing Off the Satellites	4:35
11.	"Channel Z"	Pierson; Schneider; Strickland; C. Wilson	Cosmic Thing	4:50
12.	"Deadbeat Club"	Pierson; Schneider; Strickland; C. Wilson	Cosmic Thing	4:54
13.	"Love Shack"	Pierson; Schneider; Strickland; C. Wilson	Cosmic Thing	5:22
14.	"Roam"	Pierson; Schneider; Strickland; Waldrop; C. Wilson	Cosmic Thing	4:52
15.	"Good Stuff"	Pierson; Schneider; Strickland	Good Stuff	5:55
16.	"Is That You Mo-Dean?" (edit)	Pierson; Schneider; Strickland	Good Stuff	5:07
17.	"Debbie"	Pierson; Schneider; Strickland; C. Wilson	Previously unreleased	3:34
18.	"Hallucinating Pluto"	Pierson; Schneider; Strickland; C. Wilson	Previously unreleased	4:19

International edition
No.	Title	Writer(s)	Origin	Length
1.	"Planet Claire"	Mancini; Schneider; Strickland	The B-52's	4:36
2.	"Rock Lobster" (single edit)	Schneider; R. Wilson	The B-52's	4:54
3.	"Private Idaho"	Pierson; Schneider; Strickland; C. Wilson; R. Wilson	Wild Planet	3:34
4.	"Quiche Lorraine" (live in Mountain View, California, August 1990)	Schneider; Strickland; R. Wilson	Wild Planet	4:29
5.	"Mesopotamia" (1990 remix)	Pierson; Schneider; Strickland; R. Wilson	Mesopotamia	3:50
6.	"Summer of Love" (original unreleased mix)	Pierson; Strickland; R. Wilson; C. Wilson	Bouncing Off the Satellites	4:35
7.	"Channel Z"	Pierson; Schneider; Strickland; C. Wilson	Cosmic Thing	4:50
8.	"Deadbeat Club"	Pierson; Schneider; Strickland; C. Wilson	Cosmic Thing	4:54
9.	"Love Shack"	Pierson; Schneider; Strickland; C. Wilson	Cosmic Thing	5:22
10.	"Roam"	Pierson; Schneider; Strickland; Waldrop; C. Wilson	Cosmic Thing	4:52
11.	"Good Stuff"	Pierson; Schneider; Strickland	Good Stuff	5:55
12.	"Is That You Mo-Dean?" (edit)	Pierson; Schneider; Strickland	Good Stuff	5:07
13.	"(Meet) The Flintstones"	Joseph Barbera; Hoyt Curtin; William Hanna	The Flintstones: Music from Bedrock, 1994	2:24
14.	"Debbie"	Pierson; Schneider; Strickland; C. Wilson	Previously unreleased	3:34
15.	"Hallucinating Pluto"	Pierson; Schneider; Strickland; C. Wilson	Previously unreleased	4:19

2009 Australian reissue
No.	Title	Writer(s)	Origin	Length
1.	"Planet Claire"	Mancini; Schneider; Strickland	The B-52's	4:36
2.	"Rock Lobster" (single edit)	Schneider; R. Wilson	The B-52's	4:54
3.	"Private Idaho"	Pierson; Schneider; Strickland; C. Wilson; R. Wilson	Wild Planet	3:34
4.	"Quiche Lorraine" (live in Mountain View, California, August 1990)	Schneider; Strickland; R. Wilson	Wild Planet	4:29
5.	"Mesopotamia" (1990 remix)	Pierson; Schneider; Strickland; R. Wilson	Mesopotamia	3:50
6.	"Summer of Love" (original unreleased mix)	Pierson; Strickland; R. Wilson; C. Wilson	Bouncing Off the Satellites	4:35
7.	"Channel Z"	Pierson; Schneider; Strickland; C. Wilson	Cosmic Thing	4:50
8.	"Deadbeat Club"	Pierson; Schneider; Strickland; C. Wilson	Cosmic Thing	4:54
9.	"Love Shack"	Pierson; Schneider; Strickland; C. Wilson	Cosmic Thing	5:22
10.	"Roam"	Pierson; Schneider; Strickland; Waldrop; C. Wilson	Cosmic Thing	4:52
11.	"Good Stuff"	Pierson; Schneider; Strickland	Good Stuff	5:55
12.	"Is That You Mo-Dean?" (edit)	Pierson; Schneider; Strickland	Good Stuff	5:07
13.	"(Meet) The Flintstones"	Joseph Barbera; Hoyt Curtin; William Hanna	The Flintstones: Music from Bedrock	2:24
14.	"Give Me Back My Man"	Schneider; Strickland; C. Wilson; R. Wilson	Wild Planet	4:00
15.	"Hallucinating Pluto"	Pierson; Schneider; Strickland; C. Wilson	Previously unreleased	4:19

=== Time Capsule: Videos for a Future Generation 1979–1998 ===
No.	Title	Writer(s)	Origin	Length
1.	"Rock Lobster" (live in New York City, March 1979)	Schneider; R. Wilson	The B-52's	7:07
2.	"Legal Tender"	Pierson; Schneider; Strickland; Waldrop; C. Wilson; R. Wilson	Whammy!	3:41
3.	"Song for a Future Generation"	Pierson; Schneider; Strickland; C. Wilson; R. Wilson	Whammy!	3:59
4.	"Girl from Ipanema Goes to Greenland" (single edit)	Strickland; R. Wilson; C. Wilson	Bouncing Off the Satellites	3:54
5.	"Channel Z"	Pierson; Schneider; Strickland; C. Wilson	Cosmic Thing	4:50
6.	"Love Shack" (single edit)	Pierson; Schneider; Strickland; C. Wilson	Cosmic Thing	4:19
7.	"Roam" (single edit)	Pierson; Schneider; Strickland; Waldrop; C. Wilson	Cosmic Thing	4:05
8.	"Deadbeat Club"	Pierson; Schneider; Strickland; C. Wilson	Cosmic Thing	4:54
9.	"(Shake That) Cosmic Thing" (live in Mountain View, California, August 1990)	Pierson; Schneider; Strickland; C. Wilson	Cosmic Thing	3:51
10.	"Good Stuff" (single edit)	Pierson; Schneider; Strickland	Good Stuff	4:25
11.	"Is That You Mo-Dean?" (single edit)	Pierson; Schneider; Strickland	Good Stuff	4:25
12.	"Debbie"	Pierson; Schneider; Strickland; C. Wilson	Previously unreleased	3:34

Time Capsule—The Remixes (Japan)

1. "Summer of Love" (single edit) - 3:59
2. "Summer of Love" (Summer Party Mix) - 6:03
3. "Love Shack" (DJ Tonka Remix) - 6:28
4. "Roam" (Miami Phunky Break Mix) - 7:26
5. "Roam" (Indamix Tekno Mix) - 10:13
6. "Hallucinating Pluto" (Jason's "Ride On" Remix) - 8:10
7. "Hallucinating Pluto" (The "Ride On" Beats) - 4:51 (erroneously identified on case as François K. Remix)
8. "Planet Claire" (François K. Remix) - 9:08
9. "Good Stuff" (Schottische Mix) - 3:38

Summer of Love '98 (Time Capsule—The Mixes) maxi-single

1. "Summer of Love" (David Kahne Remix) - 3:40
2. "Planet Claire" (François Kevorkian Remix) - 9:10
3. "Roam" (Miami Phunky Break Mix) - 7:26 (erroneously labeled as 7:35)
4. "Roam" (Indamix Tekno Mix) - 10:10
5. "Summer of Love" (Summer Party Mix) - 6:04

Hallucinating Pluto (Time Capsule—The Mixes) maxi-single

1. "Hallucinating Pluto" (album version) - 4:19
2. "Hallucinating Pluto" (Jason's "Ride On" Remix) - 8:10
3. "Good Stuff" (Schottische Mix) - 3:41
4. "Love Shack" (DJ Tonka Remix) - 6:28
5. "Debbie" (Edge Factor Club Mix) - 7:55
6. "Hallucinating Pluto" (The "Ride On" Beats) - 4:50
7. "Love Shack" (12" Mix) - 7:58

== Charts ==
Chart (1998)	Peak position
Australian Albums (ARIA)	40
New Zealand Albums (RMNZ)	15
US Billboard 200	93

== Certifications ==
Region	Certification	Certified units/sales
Australia (ARIA)	Platinum	70,000^{^}
United Kingdom (BPI) 2005 release	Silver	60,000^{‡}
^{^} Shipments figures based on certification alone.
