= With the Wild Crowd! Live in Athens, GA =

Video by the B-52s
- Released: October 10, 2011 (album release); March 20, 2012 (video release)
- Recorded: February 18, 2011
- Venue: The Classic Center (Athens, Georgia)
- Genres: New wave; pop rock; post-punk
- Length: 76:15
- Labels: Eagle; Eagle Rock

The B-52s chronology
Funplex (2008)	With the Wild Crowd! Live in Athens, GA (2011)	Live! 8-24-1979 (2015)

Professional ratings
Review scores
Source	Rating
AllMusic	3.5/5 stars
Blogcritics	CD (positive); DVD (positive)
Robert Christgau	A-

With the Wild Crowd! Live in Athens, GA is the first official live album and DVD release by American new wave band the B-52s. The concert was recorded on February 18, 2011, at The Classic Center in the band's hometown of Athens, Georgia, commemorating the 34th anniversary of their first performance as a group on February 14, 1977.

The audio recording was released on October 10, 2011, on CD and iTunes by Eagle Records, while a DVD and Blu-ray release followed on March 20, 2012, by Eagle Records' parent company, Eagle Rock Entertainment.

== Track listing ==
CD edition
No.	Title	Writer(s)	Origin	Length
1.	"Pump"	Kate Pierson; Fred Schneider; Keith Strickland; Cindy Wilson	Funplex, 2008	4:45
2.	"Private Idaho"	Pierson; Schneider; Strickland; C. Wilson; Ricky Wilson	Wild Planet, 1980	3:45
3.	"Mesopotamia"	Pierson; Schneider; Strickland; R. Wilson	Mesopotamia, 1982	4:50
4.	"Ultraviolet"	Pierson; Schneider; Strickland; C. Wilson	Funplex	4:21
5.	"Give Me Back My Man"	Schneider; Strickland; C. Wilson; R. Wilson	Wild Planet	5:38
6.	"Funplex"	Pierson; Schneider; Strickland; C. Wilson	Funplex	4:04
7.	"Whammy Kiss"	Pierson; Schneider; Strickland; C. Wilson; R. Wilson	Whammy!, 1983	3:50
8.	"Roam"	Pierson; Schneider; Strickland; Robert Waldrop; C. Wilson	Cosmic Thing, 1989	5:03
9.	"52 Girls"	Jeremy Ayers; R. Wilson	The B-52's, 1979	3:46
10.	"Party Out of Bounds"	Pierson; Schneider; Strickland; C. Wilson; R. Wilson	Wild Planet	3:53
11.	"Love in the Year 3000"	Pierson; Schneider; Strickland; C. Wilson	Funplex	4:15
12.	"(Shake That) Cosmic Thing"	Pierson; Schneider; Strickland; C. Wilson	Cosmic Thing	3:58
13.	"Hot Corner"	Pierson; Schneider; Strickland; C. Wilson	Funplex	3:27
14.	"Band Intros"			0:42
15.	"Love Shack"	Pierson; Schneider; Strickland; C. Wilson	Cosmic Thing	5:44
16.	"Wig"	Pierson; Schneider; Strickland; C. Wilson; R. Wilson	Bouncing Off the Satellites, 1986	4:00
17.	"Planet Claire"	Henry Mancini; Schneider; Strickland	The B-52's	4:51
18.	"Rock Lobster"	Schneider; R. Wilson	The B-52s	5:23

DVD/Blu-ray edition
No.	Title	Writer(s)	Origin	Length
1.	"Pump"	Pierson; Schneider; Strickland; Wilson	Funplex
2.	"Private Idaho"	Pierson; Schneider; Strickland; C. Wilson; R. Wilson	Wild Planet
3.	"Mesopotamia"	Pierson; Schneider; Strickland; R. Wilson	Mesopotamia
4.	"Ultraviolet"	Pierson; Schneider; Strickland; C. Wilson	Funplex
5.	"Dancing Now"	Pierson; Schneider; Strickland; C. Wilson	Funplex
6.	"Give Me Back My Man"	Schneider; Strickland; C. Wilson; R. Wilson	Wild Planet
7.	"Funplex"	Pierson; Schneider; Strickland; C. Wilson	Funplex
8.	"Whammy Kiss"	Pierson; Schneider; Strickland; C. Wilson; R. Wilson	Whammy!
9.	"Deadbeat Club"	Pierson; Schneider; Strickland; C. Wilson	Cosmic Thing
10.	"Roam"	Pierson; Schneider; Strickland; Waldrop; C. Wilson	Cosmic Thing
11.	"52 Girls"	Jeremy Ayers; R. Wilson	The B-52's
12.	"Party Out of Bounds"	Pierson; Schneider; Strickland; C. Wilson; R. Wilson	Wild Planet
13.	"Love in the Year 3000"	Pierson; Schneider; Strickland; C. Wilson	Funplex
14.	"(Shake That) Cosmic Thing"	Pierson; Schneider; Strickland; C. Wilson	Cosmic Thing
15.	"Hot Corner"	Pierson; Schneider; Strickland; C. Wilson	Funplex
16.	"Love Shack"	Pierson; Schneider; Strickland; C. Wilson	Cosmic Thing
17.	"Wig"	Pierson; Schneider; Strickland; C. Wilson; R. Wilson	Bouncing Off the Satellites
18.	"Strobe Light"	Schneider; Strickland; R. Wilson	Wild Planet
19.	"Planet Claire"	Mancini; Schneider; Strickland	The B-52's
20.	"Rock Lobster"	Schneider; R. Wilson	The B-52s

== Personnel ==
The B-52's

- Fred Schneider – vocals, glockenspiel, kaossilator, slide whistle, tambourine
- Kate Pierson – vocals, keyboards, maracas, tambourine
- Cindy Wilson – vocals, bongos, tambourine
- Keith Strickland – guitar

Additional musicians

- Tracy Wormworth – bass
- Sterling Campbell – drums
- Paul Gordon – keyboards, guitar
