= Good Stuff (disambiguation) =

Good Stuff is a 1992 album by The B-52's.

Good Stuff may also refer to:

- "Good Stuff" (The B-52's song), the title track from the 1992 album of the same name
- "Good Stuff" (Kelis song), 2000
- "The Good Stuff", a 2002 song by Kenny Chesney
- "Good Stuff", a 2005 song by Clor
- "Good Stuff" (Shakira song), a song by Shakira from the 2009 album She Wolf
- The Good Stuff (Peter Mulvey album), 2012
- The Good Stuff (from 2013), a video playlist webseries created by Craig Benzine
- "Good Stuff", a 2020 song by Griff
