= Tell It Like It T-I-Is =

1992 single by the B-52's

Single by The B-52's

from the album Good Stuff
- B-side: "The World's Green Laughter"
- Released: August 31, 1992
- Recorded: Bearsville (Woodstock, New York)
- Length: 5:13
- Label: Reprise
- Songwriters: Kate Pierson; Fred Schneider; Keith Strickland
- Producer: Nile Rodgers

The B-52's singles chronology
"Is That You Mo-Dean?" (1992)	"Tell It Like It T-I-Is" (1992)	"Revolution Earth" (1993)

"Tell It Like It T-I-Is" is a song by American new wave band The B-52's, released as the third single from their sixth studio album, Good Stuff (1992). Issued on August 31, 1992 by Reprise Records, the single reached number 61 on the UK Singles Chart and number 13 on the US Billboard Modern Rock Tracks chart. It is written by Kate Pierson, Fred Schneider and Keith Strickland, and produced by Nile Rodgers.

== Track listing ==
- 7" single
1. "Tell It Like It T-I-Is" (Edit) – 4:19
2. "The World's Green Laughter" (LP version) – 4:04
- 12" single
1. "Tell It Like It T-I-Is" (Edit) – 4:19
2. "Tell It Like It T-I-Is" (MK Respect Mix) – 5:47
3. "Tell It Like It T-I-Is" (MK Mix) – 7:42
4. "Tell It Like It T-I-Is" (MK Dub) – 6:19
5. "Tell It Like It T-I-Is" (MK Underground Mix) – 7:27

== Charts ==
Chart (1992)	Peak position
Australia (ARIA)	120
UK Singles (OCC)	61
UK Airplay (Music Week)	32
US Modern Rock Tracks (Billboard)	13
