= Is That You Mo-Dean? =

Single by The B-52s

from the album Good Stuff
- B-side: "Tell It Like It T-I-Is"
- Released: August 1992
- Genre: Pop
- Length: 5:32 (album version); 4:18 (single edit)
- Label: Reprise
- Songwriters: Kate Pierson; Fred Schneider; Keith Strickland
- Producers: Shep Pettibone; Don Was

The B-52s singles chronology
"Good Stuff" (1992)	"Is That You Mo-Dean?" (1992)	"Tell It Like It T-I-Is" (1992)

"Is That You Mo-Dean?" is a song by American band the B-52s, released in August 1992 by Reprise Records as the second single from their sixth album, Good Stuff (1992). It is written by Kate Pierson, Fred Schneider and Keith Strickland, and produced by Shep Pettibone and Don Was. The song peaked at number 78 on the UK singles chart and number 45 on the UK Airplay Chart.

== Origins ==
The song originated from a stage chant the band would play in their early days to fill time on the frequent occasions when guitarist Ricky Wilson would break a guitar string. Lead singer Fred Schneider would call and respond "Is that you, Mo-Dean?" with the audience (a name derived from Maureen "Mo" Dean, wife of Watergate scandal lawyer John Dean, but here used as the name of an imaginary alien prankster). He would alternate between this and asking the audience if there were any questions — but unable to make out the responses, he would instead just invent questions on his own and respond to them. Fred would continue until Ricky had fixed his strings, and the show would resume.

== Release and reception ==
Despite the success of the previous single "Good Stuff", the song failed to chart in most of the territories. It nevertheless became one of the most popular tracks from Good Stuff and a live favorite for many years.

The CD and 12" singles for the song have various remixes of "Is That You Mo-Dean?" by Moby.

The new edit of the song was included on the band's greatest hits compilation Time Capsule: Songs for a Future Generation. The music video for the song was featured on The B-52s' music video collection The B-52's Time Capsule: Videos for a Future Generation 1979-1998.

== Track listing ==
- 7"
1. "Is That You Mo-Dean?" (Edit) – 4:18
2. "Good Stuff" (LP Version) – 5:59
- 12"
1. "Is That You Mo-Dean?" (Interdimension Mix) – 6:32
2. "Is That You Mo-Dean?" (Liquid Sky Dub) – 6:13
3. "Tell It Like It T-I-Is" (MK Dub) – 6:19
4. "Is That You Mo-Dean?" (Harpapella) – 3:07

Note1: Tracks 1, 2 and 4 remixed by Moby.
Note2: Track 3 remixed by MK.

== Charts ==
Chart performance for "Is That You Mo-Dean?"
Chart (1992)	Peak position
UK Singles (OCC)	78
UK Airplay (Music Week)	45
