= Meet the Flintstones =

Theme from animated television series The Flintstones

The theme song played on a piano

"Meet the Flintstones", also worded as "(Meet) The Flintstones", is the theme song of the American 1960s animated television series The Flintstones. Composed in 1961 by Hoyt Curtin, Joseph Barbera and William Hanna, it is one of the most popular and best known of all theme songs, with its catchy lyrics "Flintstones, meet the Flintstones, they're the modern Stone Age family".

== Background ==
The opening and closing credits theme during the first two seasons was called "Rise and Shine", a lively instrumental underscore accompanying Fred on his drive home from work. The tune resembled "The Bugs Bunny Overture (This Is It!)", the theme song of The Bugs Bunny Show, also airing on ABC at the time, which may have been why it was changed in the third season.

Before being adopted as the TV theme, "Meet the Flintstones" was released on the Golden Records 78 rpm children's record release Songs of the Flintstones (Golden R680, 1961), as the A-side to a version of "Rise and Shine" with lyrics. It includes verses related to Barney and Betty Rubble and to Dino that are not heard in the later TV version. The melody of "Meet the Flintstones" can also be heard as incidental music in some episodes of the first two seasons.

Starting in Season 3, Episode 3 ("Barney the Invisible"), "Meet the Flintstones" became the opening and closing credits theme. This version was recorded by a 22-piece big band conducted by Curtin and performed by the Randy Van Horne Singers. The melody is believed to have been inspired from part of the B section of the second movement of Beethoven's Piano Sonata No. 17 (The "Tempest"). The "Meet the Flintstones" opening was later added to the first two seasons for syndication, with "Rise and Shine" restored when the series was rereleased to syndication and, later, home video in the 1990s. The musical underscores were also credited to Curtin for the show's first five seasons; Ted Nichols took over in 1965 for the final season. During the show's final season, "Open Up Your Heart (And Let the Sunshine In)", performed by Pebbles and Bamm-Bamm in a clip from that season's first episode, was used as alternate close music.

== Popularity ==
In 2010, a PRS for Music survey of 2,000 adults in the UK found that the "Meet the Flintstones" theme tune was the most recognised children's TV theme, ahead of those for Top Cat and Postman Pat.

== Use in jazz ==
Recorded in E-flat major, "Meet the Flintstones" is a contrafact of the jazz standard “I Got Rhythm”, as it conforms to the structure known as rhythm changes, a well-known and popular chord structure in jazz composition. “Meet the Flinstones” may be played as a stand-alone jazz piece, or its melody may be used briefly as a jazz quote over the many other more traditional jazz standards that are also contrafacts using rhythm changes. The song or quote may be played to amuse audiences, in what is known as "jazz humor". The International Association of Jazz Record Collectors calls it "campy" and "cheek by jowl". Rhythm changes and its contrafacts are often performed at an exhilarating pace, which is technically challenging for some. The song has been recorded by Barry Harris on his album Live at Maybeck Recital Hall, Volume Twelve included in a medley with "It Never Entered My Mind" and "I Love Lucy". In 2015, The Brian Setzer Orchestra recorded a version with Christmas-themed lyrics, "Yabba-Dabba-Yuletide", on its Christmas album Rockin’ Rudolph.

The song was featured in the sitcom Full House and its successor Fuller House.

== The BC-52's cover ==
"(Meet) The Flintstones"

Single by the B.C. 52's

from the album The Flintstones: Music from Bedrock
- Released: May 14, 1994
- Genre: Pop; house (remix)
- Length: 2:24
- Label: MCA
- Songwriters: Hoyt Curtin; Joseph Barbera; William Hanna
- Producers: Kate Pierson; Fred Schneider; Keith Strickland

The B-52's singles chronology
"Hot Pants Explosion" (1993)	"(Meet) The Flintstones" (1994)	"Debbie" (1998)

"(Meet) The Flintstones" was covered by American new wave band the B-52's as "the B.C. 52's", a fictional band from the comedy film The Flintstones (1994), with an additional verse added. The song was released by MCA Records as a single from the movie's soundtrack, peaking at number 33 on the US Billboard Hot 100. It was the band's joint highest entry on the Billboard Hot Dance Club Play chart at number three, tying with "Summer of Love" from 1986. The song was also the band's second-highest-charting single on the UK singles chart (the highest being "Love Shack" at number two), also peaking at number three. Its accompanying music video, directed by Brian Levant, received heavy rotation on music television channels such as MTV Europe and Germany's VIVA.

=== Critical reception ===
Larry Flick wrote in Billboard magazine, "That's actually enduring kitsch rock act The B-52's having a field day with the theme from the classic animated series. Lifted and revamped from the soundtrack to the upcoming movie, the track pushes an insistent tribal beat, topped with snatches of cartoon music and vocal loops. Props to remixer Junior Vasquez for a valiant effort. He handles the task of turning a novelty tune into hip jam with agility. Still, the whole thing is so weird that punters may stand and listen before they begin to twirl." Dave Sholin from the Gavin Report concluded, "Only someone who's been hiding in a cave or living under bedrock for the past year wouldn't know about this cartoon come-to-life. Who better than this fun-loving trio to put a '90s spin on this well-known theme."

Pan-European magazine Music & Media commented, "Yabba Dabba Doo! Temporarily renamed BC-52's, Fred Schneider and Kate Pierson make a credible Fred and Wilma on this 'remake of the cartoon's classic theme song." Alan Jones of Music Week wrote, "The Flintstones movie spins off its first single, a quirky remake of the familiar theme tune by the barely incognito B52's. Great fun, in both its succinct pop edit and a stomping house remix." David Quantick from NME named it "a fine single". He added, "It gets off to a corking start and then hangs around waiting from some kind of melodic bus. This turns up and then things get going again. Next there is a spectacularly stupid bit and it ends. [...] But for now "Meet the Flintstones" is a classic of leopardskin good nature-style poperama." Emma Cochrane from Smash Hits gave it a score of three out of five, saying, "This lacks anything resembling tastefulness yet it's so happy you can't help liking it."

=== Music video ===
The music video for "Meet the Flintstones" was directed by American filmmaker Brian Levant, and produced by Bruce Cohen and Tom Lowe. Levant also directed The Flintstones film. The video received heavy rotation on MTV Europe and was A-listed on Germany's VIVA in August 1994.

=== Track listings ===
- 7-inch single
1. (Meet) The Flintstones (original LP version) (Fred's edit) – 2:24
2. (Meet) The Flintstones (Barney's edit) – 2:28
- 12-inch maxi
1. (Meet) The Flintstones (Space Cowboy mix 1) – 6:55
2. (Meet) The Flintstones (Space Cowboy mix 2) – 6:55
3. (Meet) The Flintstones (instrumental) – 6:55

=== Charts ===
==== Weekly charts ====
Chart (1994)	Peak position
Australia (ARIA)	54
Austria (Ö3 Austria Top 40)	11
Belgium (Ultratop 50 Flanders)	2
Canada Top Singles (RPM)	19
Denmark (IFPI)	9
Europe (Eurochart Hot 100)	5
Europe (European AC Radio)	7
Europe (European Hit Radio)	6
Germany (GfK)	9
Iceland (Íslenski Listinn Topp 40)	5
Ireland (IRMA)	5
Israel (Israeli Singles Chart)	23
Italy (Musica e dischi)	10
Netherlands (Dutch Top 40)	4
Netherlands (Single Top 100)	5
New Zealand (Recorded Music NZ)	15
Norway (VG-lista)	8
Peru (UPI)	2
Scottish Singles Sales (Official Charts)	2
Spain (AFYVE)	7
Sweden (Sverigetopplistan)	18
Switzerland (Schweizer Hitparade)	12
UK Singles (Official Charts)	3
UK Airplay (Music Week)	7
UK Club Chart (Music Week)	16
Uruguay (UPI)	1
US Billboard Hot 100	33
US Dance Club Songs (Billboard)	3
US Pop Airplay (Billboard)	19
US Cash Box Top 100	34

==== Year-end charts ====
Chart (1994)	Position
Belgium (Ultratop)	36
Brazil (Crowley)	87
Europe (Eurochart Hot 100)	66
Europe (European Hit Radio)	28
Germany (Media Control)	82
Iceland (Íslenski Listinn Topp 40)	82
Netherlands (Dutch Top 40)	58
Netherlands (Single Top 100)	74
Sweden (Topplistan)	98
UK Singles (OCC)	21
UK Airplay (Music Week)	44

=== Certifications ===
Region	Certification	Certified units/sales
New Zealand (RMNZ)	Gold	5,000^{*}
United Kingdom (BPI)	Silver	200,000^{^}
^{*} Sales figures based on certification alone.^{^} Shipments figures based on certification alone.

=== Release history ===
Region	Date	Format(s)	Label(s)	Ref.
United States	May 14, 1994	7-inch vinyl; cassette	MCA	
Australia	June 13, 1994	CD; cassette	MCA	
Japan	June 22, 1994	Mini-CD	MCA	
United Kingdom	June 27, 1994	7-inch vinyl; CD; cassette	MCA	

== Jacob Collier and other covers ==
On May 1, 2016, Jacob Collier released a multitrack vocal jazz version of the song as the second single from his debut album In My Room. He won the Grammy Award for Best Arrangement, Instrumental and Vocals for the cover at the 59th Annual Grammy Awards. The song is also a running gag on the musical parody YouTube channel SiIvaGunner, where it is frequently incorporated into bait-and-switch videos claiming to be "high quality rips" of video game music produced by the group.
