= Debbie (song) =

1998 single by the B-52's

Single by the B-52's

from the album Time Capsule: Songs for a Future Generation
- B-side: "The World's Green Laughter"; "Cosmic Thing" (live)
- Released: April 28, 1998
- Length: 3:33
- Label: Reprise
- Songwriters: Fred Schneider; Kate Pierson; Keith Strickland; Cindy Wilson
- Producer: The B-52's

The B-52's singles chronology
"(Meet) The Flintstones" (1994)	"Debbie" (1998)	"Love Shack '99" (1999)

"Debbie" is the lead single from the compilation album Time Capsule: Songs for a Future Generation by American rock band the B-52's. The song was inspired by Debbie Harry of the band Blondie. The single's music video was directed by Ramaa Mosley.

== Track listing ==
CD

1. "Debbie" (album version) – 3:33
2. "The World's Green Laughter" – 4:04
3. "Cosmic Thing" (live) – 3:50
  - recorded at the Shoreline Amphitheatre Mountainview on the 17 August 1990

== Charts ==
Chart (1998)	Peak position
US Alternative Airplay (Billboard)	35
US Dance Club Songs (Billboard)	32
