= Wig (song) =

Single by the B-52's

from the album Bouncing off the Satellites
- B-side: "Summer of Love" (Remix); "Song for a Future Generation"
- Released: 1987
- Recorded: 1985
- Genre: New wave
- Length: 4:22
- Label: Warner Bros. / Island
- Songwriter: The B-52's
- Producer: Tony Mansfield

The B-52's singles chronology
"Girl from Ipanema Goes to Greenland" (1986)	"Wig" (1987)	"Channel Z" (1989)

"Wig" is a song by American new wave band the B-52's, the third and final single from their fourth studio album Bouncing Off the Satellites (1986).

== Release and promotion ==
The single was released to coincide with the delayed release of Bouncing Off the Satellites in the UK in 1987, a year after it had been released in the U.S.; thus "Wig" was released in the UK only and was the first single from the album there.

While the band didn't tour in support of Bouncing Off the Satellites upon its original release, due to guitarist Ricky Wilson's then-recent death, they traveled to the UK to make promotional appearances, miming to "Wig" on TV and being interviewed in magazines. The single peaked at No. 79 in the UK.

Many years later, in 2010, the band started playing "Wig" live, and a live version was included on their With The Wild Crowd! live album.

== Track listing ==
=== UK 12" single: Island Records ===
1. "Wig" - 4:22
2. "Summer of Love" - 3:58
3. "Song for a Future Generation" - 4:00

=== UK 7" single: Island Records ===
1. "Wig" - 4:22
2. "Summer of Love" (Remix by Shep Pettibone) - 3:58
