= Girl from Ipanema Goes to Greenland =

Single by the B-52's

from the album Bouncing Off the Satellites
- Released: 1986
- Studio: Sigma Sound (New York City)
- Genre: New wave; synth-pop
- Length: 4:22
- Label: Warner Bros.
- Songwriters: Keith Strickland; Cindy Wilson; Ricky Wilson
- Producers: Tony Mansfield; Shep Pettibone

The B-52's singles chronology
"Summer of Love" (1986)	"Girl from Ipanema Goes to Greenland" (1986)	"Wig" (1987)

"Girl from Ipanema Goes to Greenland" is the second single from the fourth studio album Bouncing Off the Satellites by American new wave band the B-52's. The single peaked at No. 10 on the Billboard Hot Dance Club Play, their fourth Top 10 entry on that chart. It was one of the last songs that guitarist and founding member Ricky Wilson recorded with the band before his death. A music video was made around 1986 in memory of Wilson, in particular, the band uses an overlay of his face as the rising moon in the video. The song title refers to Antônio Carlos Jobim's 1963 hit song "The Girl from Ipanema".

== Track listing ==
1. "Girl from Ipanema Goes to Greenland" (Extended Mix) – 8:56
2. "Girl from Ipanema Goes to Greenland" (Single edit) – 3:58
3. "Girl from Ipanema Goes to Greenland" (12" Mix) – 7:05
4. "Girl from Ipanema Goes to Greenland" (Dub) – 7:02
- Track 1 remixed by Shep Pettibone.
- Tracks 3 and 4 remixed by the Latin Rascals.

== Charts ==
Chart	Peak position
U.S. Billboard Hot Dance Club Play	10
