= Summer of Love (The B-52's song) =

- U.S. 7-inch vinyl single picture sleeve

Single by the B-52's

from the album Bouncing Off the Satellites
- B-side: "Housework"
- Released: 1986
- Recorded: 1985
- Genre: New wave; synth-pop
- Length: 4:02
- Label: Warner Bros.
- Songwriters: Kate Pierson; Keith Strickland; Cindy Wilson; Ricky Wilson
- Producers: Tony Mansfield; Shep Pettibone

The B-52's singles chronology
"Song for a Future Generation" (1983)	"Summer of Love" (1986)	"Girl from Ipanema Goes to Greenland" (1986)

Official audio
- "Summer of Love" on YouTube

"Summer of Love" is a song by American new wave band the B-52's, released as the first single from their fourth studio album, Bouncing Off the Satellites (1986).

The single peaked at No. 3 on the U.S. Billboard Hot Dance Club Play chart, making it their highest entry up to that point (although 1994's "(Meet) The Flintstones" would reach the same position on the chart).

The original 1985 demo version was released on the band's compilation album Time Capsule: Songs for a Future Generation (1998).

The single was reissued in 2017 as a limited edition 12" red vinyl.

== Track listing ==
7" single

1. "Summer of Love" – 4:02
2. "Housework" – 4:04

12" single

1. "Summer of Love" (Summer Party Mix) – 6:04
2. "Summer of Love" (Love Dub) – 7:47
3. "Summer of Love" (Single Edit) – 3:58

== Charts ==
Chart	Peak position
Australian ARIA Singles Chart	90
U.S. Billboard Hot Dance Club Play	3
