= Revolution Earth =

Single by The B-52's

from the album Good Stuff
- B-side: "Revolution Earth (CO2 Edit)"
- Released: February 1993
- Recorded: 1991
- Genre: Rock
- Length: 5:48
- Label: Reprise
- Songwriters: Kate Pierson; Fred Schneider; Robert Waldrop
- Producer: Nile Rodgers

The B-52's singles chronology
"Tell It Like It T-I-Is" (1992)	"Revolution Earth" (1993)	"Hot Pants Explosion" (1993)

"Revolution Earth" is a song by American new wave band the B-52's, released in February 1993, by Reprise Records, as the fourth single from their sixth album, Good Stuff (1992). The song is written by band members Kate Pierson and Fred Schneider with Robert Waldrop and produced by Nile Rodgers. The accompanying music video was directed by American painter and filmmaker James Herbert. The single contains remixes of the song by Moby.

== Composition and recording ==
The song is an upbeat, folk influenced song, a radical stylistic departure for the B-52's. It is one of many songs with lyrics co-written with Robert Waldrop, a friend of the band.

Featuring Kate Pierson on lead vocals, "Revolution Earth" remains a fan favourite despite the fact that it is from an album featuring only three of the original five members of the band. With founding member Cindy Wilson absent from the recording, Pierson sings in harmony with herself - multi-tracking different vocal lines. Fred Schneider sings a brief backing vocal. As with many of the tracks from the Good Stuff album, "Revolution Earth" has a long and resounding intro and outro, as opposed to the band's earlier songs which always had a definite beginning and ending.

== Live performances ==
"Revolution Earth" was regularly featured in the B-52's live shows from 1992 up until about 2002, and then again from 2015. Julee Cruise sang harmony during live performances until 1996 when Cindy Wilson rejoined the band. Live performances of the song from 2000 until 2002 were based on the CO_{2} Mix, one of several remixes created by Moby, couched in a faster rhythm and featured Sara Lee (then bass player for the band) on backing vocals, along with Wilson.

== Tracklisting ==
- CD
1. Revolution Earth (Edit) – 4:08
2. Revolution Earth (CO2 Mix) – 8:33
3. Revolution Earth (Vibe Tribe Mix) – 4:53
4. Revolution Earth (PMM Dub) – 6:52

== Charts ==
Chart (1993)	Peak position
Australia (ARIA)	146

== Cover versions ==
The song was covered on the Whirligig album Spin and featured Terre Roche.
