= Good Stuff (The B-52's song) =

1992 single by the B-52's

Single by the B-52's

from the album Good Stuff
- B-side: "Bad Influence"; "Return to Dreamland"
- Released: June 8, 1992
- Studio: Bearsville (Woodstock, New York)
- Length: 5:58
- Label: Reprise
- Songwriters: Kate Pierson; Fred Schneider; Keith Strickland
- Producer: Don Was

The B-52's singles chronology
"Deadbeat Club" (1990)	"Good Stuff" (1992)	"Is That You Mo-Dean?" (1992)

"Good Stuff" is a song by American new wave band the B-52's, released in June 1992 by Reprise Records as the first single from their sixth studio album, also titled Good Stuff (1992).

== Releases and reception ==
"Good Stuff" reached number 28 on the US Billboard Hot 100 on August 1, 1992, and number one on the Billboard Modern Rock Tracks chart for four weeks in July 1992. It also peaked at number two in Portugal, number 21 in the United Kingdom, number 23 in New Zealand, and number 24 in Canada.

The single was released in two editions, one of which featured B-sides including instrumental non-album track "Return to Dreamland", while the other edition featured remixes.

A music video for "Good Stuff" was also released and includes a cameo appearance by RuPaul, who previously appeared in the video for "Love Shack".

The song is featured in the movie D2: The Mighty Ducks.

== Track listings ==
- CD
1. "Good Stuff" (edit) – 4:08
2. "Bad Influence" (album version) – 5:43
3. "Return to Dreamland" – 4:53
- Remix CD
1. "Good Stuff" (album edit) – 4:05
2. "Good Stuff" (12-inch remix) – 7:51
3. "Good Stuff" (Schottische mix) – 3:40
4. "Bad Influence" (album version) – 5:43
5. "Good Stuff" (remix edit) – 3:54
- Remix 12"
1. "Good Stuff" (12-inch remix) – 7:51
2. "Good Stuff" (remix edit) – 3:54
3. "Good Stuff" (Schottische mix) – 3:40
4. "Bad Influence" (album version) – 5:43

== Charts ==
=== Weekly charts ===
Chart (1992)	Peak position
Australia (ARIA)	56
Belgium (Ultratop 50 Flanders)	25
Canada Top Singles (RPM)	24
Europe (Eurochart Hot 100)	31
Finland (Suomen virallinen lista)	16
Germany (GfK)	37
Netherlands (Dutch Top 40)	27
Netherlands (Single Top 100)	28
New Zealand (Recorded Music NZ)	23
Portugal (AFP)	2
UK Singles (Official Charts)	21
UK Airplay (Music Week)	4
US Billboard Hot 100	28
US Alternative Airplay (Billboard)	1
US Dance Singles Sales (Billboard)	21
US Cash Box Top 100	19

=== Year-end charts ===
Chart (1992)	Position
UK Airplay (Music Week)	57

== See also ==
- Number one modern rock hits of 1992
