= Tame Yourself =

Compilation album by Various artists
- Released: April 30, 1991
- Label: RNA/Rhino

Tame Yourself is an album released by Rhino Records on April 30, 1991, to benefit PETA. The album debuted at #184 on the Billboard 200 and peaked at #165 during its 3rd week on the chart.

== Track listing ==
1. "Don't Be Part of It" - Howard Jones
2. "Tame Yourself" - Raw Youth
3. "I'll Give You My Skin" - Indigo Girls and Michael Stipe
4. "Damned Old Dog" - k.d. lang
5. "Quiche Lorraine" (Live) - The B-52's
6. "Slaves" - Fetchin' Bones
7. "Born for a Purpose" - The Pretenders
8. "Don't Kill The Animals" ('91 Mix) - Nina Hagen and Lene Lovich
9. "Fur" - Jane Wiedlin
10. "Asleep Too Long" - The Goosebumps
11. "Rage" - Erasure and Lene Lovich
12. "Bless the Beasts and the Children" - Belinda Carlisle
13. "Across the Way" - Aleka's Attic
14. "Do What I Have to Do" - Exene Cervenka

== Single track listing ==
A limited edition remix collection entitled "Housebroken Dance Mixes" was released by Rhino in 1991, available only on 12" vinyl.

1. "Don't Be Part of It" (Moo Mix)
2. "Don't Be Part of It" (Dub)
3. "Fur" (Faux Version)
4. "Rage" (Vitamitavegemix)
5. "Rage" (Dub)
6. "Don't Kill the Animals" (Rescue Remix)

== Charts ==
Chart performance for Tame Yourself
Chart (1991)	Peak position
US Billboard 200	165
