= Cosmic Thing =

Studio album by the B-52's
- Released: June 27, 1989
- Recorded: 1988–1989
- Studios: Skyline (New York City); Electric Lady (New York City); Dreamland (Hurley, New York); Bearsville (Bearsville, New York)
- Genre: Pop rock
- Length: 47:03
- Label: Reprise
- Producers: Nile Rodgers (tracks 1–3, 6, 9–10); Don Was (tracks 4–5, 7–8)

The B-52's chronology
| Bouncing Off the Satellites (1986) | Cosmic Thing (1989) | Good Stuff (1992) |

Singles from Cosmic Thing
- 1. "Channel Z" Released: 1989; 2. "Love Shack" Released: June 20, 1989; 3. "Roam" Released: 1989; 4. "Cosmic Thing" Released: 1989 (Spain, Philippines, and Mexico); 5. "Deadbeat Club" Released: 1990

Cosmic Thing is the fifth studio album by American new wave band the B-52's, released in 1989 by Reprise Records. It contains the hit singles "Love Shack", "Roam" and "Deadbeat Club". The music video for "Love Shack" won the award for Best Group Video at the 1990 MTV Video Music Awards. Six of the album's songs were produced by Nile Rodgers in New York City, and the remaining four by Don Was in upstate New York.

Cosmic Thing was the ninth best-selling album of 1990 in the US, peaking at No. 4 on the Billboard 200, and was an international success as well, charting in the Top 10 in the UK, and reaching No. 1 in Australia and New Zealand. The album eventually achieved 4× Platinum status in the US and Platinum status in the UK. Its success served as a comeback for the band, following the death of guitarist, songwriter and founding member Ricky Wilson in 1985. The band also embarked on the worldwide Cosmic Tour to promote the album.

== Background ==
I wanted to keep some connection with what Ricky had done... He was a very key ingredient in our sound, and I just didn't want that to disappear. I knew that once we started playing live, there'd be older material to play, and if we got somebody else, I'd have to be there giving them a lot of hints, like the tunings and everything. So I figured I'd just do it myself. I knew enough that I thought I could do it. Well, I was hoping I could do it.

— Keith Strickland; Rolling Stone magazine, 1990

Following guitarist Ricky Wilson's death and the band's short promotional campaign for their 1986 album Bouncing Off the Satellites, the band was uncertain about their future together. The album had been the band's most expensive to produce, and their foregoing of a tour to promote it resulted in the band seeing little revenue, which led to them experiencing great financial difficulties.

In 1988, prompted by drummer/guitarist Keith Strickland, the band began to convene and write new songs. Singer Kate Pierson described this as a healing process for herself and the band after Wilson's death three years prior. Much of the album was written in Woodstock and surrounding areas in upstate New York, a place to which Strickland and Pierson had both relocated during the group's hiatus, and all four members felt a proximity to nature in these places that was not found in their previous home of New York City. The band spent approximately a year writing the songs. Strickland stated, "We spent a lot of time just talking, and we needed that. We were our own support group after Ricky's passing, which was a very traumatic thing for all of us and, in particular, for Cindy [Wilson]."

The band rented a rehearsal space in the Wall Street area of Manhattan, in which they worked four days a week. At this time, the band also left their longtime manager, Gary Kurfirst, and left longtime label Warner Bros. for Reprise.

== Composition ==
In the wake of Wilson's death, Strickland took over both guitar duties and the bulk of the music composition responsibilities. For the new songs, Strickland recorded instrumental demos and singers Pierson, Cindy Wilson and Fred Schneider would then improvise melodies and lyrics over the recordings, with all four band members devising the final song arrangements together. The first piece of music Strickland composed for the album would eventually become "Deadbeat Club", whose autobiographical lyrics about the band's early life in Athens, Georgia would serve as a blueprint for the album. "Junebug" was the first song to be fully completed during the band's compositional jam sessions, which gave them confidence to persevere. Pierson described these songs as being "cinematic" and "nostalgic", and felt that the album in general had developed a "rural, kind of southern, dusty feeling to it". Wilson added, "It was all about nostalgia. It was looking back at the good times we used to have in Athens, so it was a wonderful, healing record."

Our 'agenda' wasn't at first necessarily related to 'queerness,' but more universal—putting lyrics in that referenced political ideas. But later, after Ricky’s death, we became much more activist, becoming involved with PETA, environmental causes, LGBTQA rights, and especially AIDS activism. During this time, many other friends were dying of AIDS; it was terrifying and sad, and we joined in to do what we could and speak out.

— Kate Pierson; grammy.com, 2019

Pierson stated that some songs on Cosmic Thing were more "pointed" about their concerns—such as environmentalism—than on previous albums, adding, "we definitely still have a light tone, but I think we've all evolved and grown and matured". Discussing "Channel Z", Schneider later recalled, "We were really pretty political as a band. Rather than clothes and wigs and stuff, I'd rather talk about politics, and I know the others do too, because it's more important, what's going on in the world."

== Recording and production ==
Recording of the album was focused in two locations: Skyline Studios in New York City, and Dreamland Recording Studios in West Hurley, New York. The initial sessions in New York City were produced by Nile Rodgers, while the West Hurley sessions were helmed by Don Was. The band had previously worked with Rodgers when he recorded their song "(Shake That) Cosmic Thing" for the soundtrack to the 1988 film Earth Girls Are Easy.

The album's biggest hit, "Love Shack", was the last song recorded for the album and was developed from a 15-minute unfinished piece the band had created. Strickland had initially felt the song was not ready to be released, but Pierson and Schneider felt it would be successful. After the band finished their sessions with Was a day ahead of schedule, he asked if they had any more material and the song was brought in to refine and embellish upon.

Music journalist Michael Azerrad noted that Strickland devised the album's final track sequence as if it were a film, moving from rural themes to more abstract concepts, culminating with an instrumental coda akin to a closing credits sequence. Strickland later elaborated: "We sequenced it in a way that we felt told a story. I don't know if anybody's ever noticed it, but one song leads into the other in a nice way. It tells a story from beginning to end."

== Promotion and commercial performance ==
"Channel Z" was selected as the album's first single and was released in March 1989. While the single was not commercially successful in the mainstream at first, it generated substantial amounts of airplay on American college radio, helping re-establish the group's youth popularity. The single eventually peaked at number one on the Billboard Modern Rock Tracks chart, and reached number 61 on the UK singles chart.

Following the release of promotional single "Cosmic Thing", June 1989 saw the release of the band's largest global hit, "Love Shack". Pierson recalled that radio programmers initially "weren't really enthusiastic" about the song and that Schneider was instrumental in promoting it to indie radio stations, which eventually led to its embrace by college radio. The track helped propel the success of the album globally, while reaching number 3 on the US Billboard Hot 100, and number one on Billboard's Modern Rock Tracks chart. The song also reached number 2 in the UK, and spent 8 weeks at number one in Australia in 1990. Following this, the album reached the top 10 in the US and UK album charts, and number one in Australia and New Zealand. The song's music video won the award for Best Group Video at the 1990 MTV Video Music Awards.

Aided by the further success of singles such as the transatlantic top 20 hit "Roam" and the US top 30 hit "Deadbeat Club", the album continued to sell strongly, particularly in the US, where it spent 22 weeks inside the Billboard 200 top 10 in 1990, becoming the country's 9th best-selling album of the year.

By 2000, Cosmic Thing had achieved platinum status in the UK, and 4× platinum status in the US, denoting sales of over four million copies there. As of 2019, the album had sold over five million copies worldwide.

== Critical reception ==
Professional ratings
Review scores
| Source | Rating |
|---|---|
| AllMusic | 4/5 stars |
| Chicago Tribune | 3/4 stars |
| Los Angeles Times | 3/5 stars |
| NME | 7/10 |
| PopMatters | 9/10 |
| Rolling Stone | 3/5 stars |
| The Rolling Stone Album Guide | 3/5 stars |
| Spin Alternative Record Guide | 8/10 |
| The Village Voice | B |

Robert Christgau of The Village Voice opined that the album was "an almost touchingly brave attempt to dance away from the edge of ecocatastrophe" and found the band "trying to be seriously silly", but concluded that, "between Ricky Wilson's guitar and the permanent defeat his loss doesn't merely signify, they can't quite bring it off." Jim Farber of Rolling Stone thought the album found the B-52's "on summer vacation, hanging out in the heat, fashioning insouciant odes to sloth", and that the band still mixed seriousness with "an impassioned commitment to goofiness." He continued that the best songs "proudly declare silliness as a central part of identity" and that their most exciting material had always been "ballads with a backbeat", citing "Roam" and "Dry County" as examples. Kristine McKenna of Los Angeles Times felt the album sounded "remarkably fresh", despite adhering to a classic formula, and observed that "the slower pace of life associated with the South colors the entire album", noting that Wilson and Pierson "give soul to this irresistible LP, which may shape up to be the record you hear at every party this summer."

In retrospective reviews, Stephen Thomas Erlewine of AllMusic found the album to be "a first-class return to form" that "updated their sound with shiny new surfaces and deep, funky grooves", containing "their best set of songs since at least Wild Planet, possibly since their debut." J.D. Considine in The New Rolling Stone Album Guide observed that the songs "reprise the band's early sound without any edge or ambiguity", and saw the band "tumble into self-caricature." Rich Wilhelm of PopMatters noted that while Cosmic Thing "fully brought the band's sound to the mainstream", it also "proved to have depth" and was "a fun, beautiful, and life-affirming record that was also a big hit."

== Tour ==
In addition to the album's successful singles, the band embarked upon the extensive "Cosmic Tour" to promote the album worldwide, their first tour since Ricky Wilson's death. Drummer Strickland switched to guitar for the tour with Zack Alford serving as the touring drummer. Sara Lee played bass guitar and Pat Irwin was keyboardist and extra guitarist. This was also the first tour in which the group hired a backing band, meaning the group's members, especially Pierson, had more opportunity to move around on stage and gave their songs more accuracy to the studio versions in concert. Due to the band's growth in popularity at this time, the tour venues grew from theaters to large arenas and stadiums.

The band's first comeback performance was at a benefit for PETA and they arranged for various organizations, including PETA, Greenpeace and Amnesty International, to advertise at each concert's venue.

== Track listing ==
All tracks are written by the B-52's, except "Roam", with lyrics by Robert Waldrop.

Side one
| No. | Title | Vocals | Length |
|---|---|---|---|
| 1. | "Cosmic Thing" | Schneider; Pierson; Wilson | 3:50 |
| 2. | "Dry County" | Schneider; Strickland; Pierson; Wilson | 4:54 |
| 3. | "Deadbeat Club" | Wilson; Pierson; Schneider; Strickland | 4:45 |
| 4. | "Love Shack" | Schneider; Pierson; Wilson | 5:21 |
| 5. | "Junebug" | Schneider; Pierson; Wilson | 5:04 |

Side two
| No. | Title | Vocals | Length |
|---|---|---|---|
| 1. | "Roam" | Pierson; Wilson | 4:54 |
| 2. | "Bushfire" | Wilson; Pierson; Schneider | 4:58 |
| 3. | "Channel Z" | Pierson; Wilson; Schneider | 4:49 |
| 4. | "Topaz" | Pierson; Wilson; Schneider; Strickland | 4:20 |
| 5. | "Follow Your Bliss" | Pierson; Sara Lee | 4:08 |
| Total length: | | | 47:03 |

30th Anniversary Expanded Edition, disc 1: Assorted B-Sides & Remixes, Remastered
| No. | Title | Origin | Length |
|---|---|---|---|
| 11. | "B-52's Megamix" | "Deadbeat Club" 12-inch single | 6:36 |
| 12. | "Love Shack" (Edit) | "Love Shack" 7-inch single | 4:23 |
| 13. | "Channel Z" (Rock Mix) | "Channel Z" 12-inch single | 6:22 |
| 14. | "Roam" (Extended Remix) | "Roam" 12-inch single | 5:28 |
| 15. | "Roam" (12-inch Remix) | "Roam" 12-inch single | 8:17 |

30th Anniversary Expanded Edition, disc 2: Cosmic Tour, Live, 1990
| No. | Title | Length |
|---|---|---|
| 1. | "Cosmic Thing" (Live) | 4:05 |
| 2. | "Bushfire" (Live) | 5:12 |
| 3. | "Quiche Lorraine" (Live) | 4:09 |
| 4. | "Dance This Mess Around" (Live) | 5:37 |
| 5. | "Dry County" (Live) | 4:54 |
| 6. | "Private Idaho" (Live) | 3:42 |
| 7. | "Give Me Back My Man" (Live) | 4:17 |
| 8. | "Deadbeat Club" (Live) | 5:15 |
| 9. | "Mesopotamia" (Live) | 5:35 |
| 10. | "Strobe Light" (Live) | 4:00 |
| 11. | "Roam" (Live) | 6:17 |
| 12. | "52 Girls" (Live) | 3:33 |
| 13. | "Love Shack" (Live) | 7:34 |
| 14. | "Rock Lobster" (Live) | 4:59 |
| 15. | "Whammy Kiss" (Live) | 4:06 |
| 16. | "Channel Z" (Live) | 6:24 |

=== Notes ===
- With the exception of track 15, all tracks on disc 2 of the "30th Anniversary Expanded Edition" were recorded live on August 4, 1990, at the Cynthia Woods Mitchell Pavilion in the Woodlands, Texas, near Houston. Track 15 was recorded live on August 3, 1990, at the Starplex Amphitheatre in Dallas.

== Personnel ==
Credits adapted from CD liner notes.

The B-52's

- Kate Pierson – vocals (1–9), keyboards (4, 5, 8), backing vocals (10)
- Fred Schneider – vocals (1, 2, 4, 5, 7–9), percussion (5, 7), backing vocals (3)
- Keith Strickland – guitars, keyboards (2, 5, 7–10), backing vocals (2, 3, 9)
- Cindy Wilson – vocals (1–9)

Additional musicians

- Tommy Mandel – keyboards (1)
- Steve Ferrone – drums (1)
- Sara Lee – bass guitar (2–7, 9, 10), keyboards (10), backing vocals (10)
- Philippe Saisse – keyboards (2, 3)
- Sonny Emory – drums (2, 3)
- Charlie Drayton – drums (4, 5, 7, 8)
- The Uptown Horns (4):
  - Chris Cioe
  - Paul Litteral
  - Arno Hecht
  - Bob Funk
  - Carl Beatty
- LeRoy Clouden – drums (6, 9, 10)
- Richard Hilton – keyboard (6, 10), programming (1–3, 6, 9, 10)
- Nile Rodgers – guitar (9)

Technical

- Nile Rodgers – producer (1–3, 6, 9, 10), mixing (1–3, 6, 9, 10)
- Don Was – producer (4, 5, 7, 8)
- Tom Durack – engineer (1–3, 6, 9, 10), mixing
- Ed Brooks – second engineer (1–3, 6, 9, 10)
- Keith Freedman – second engineer (1–3, 6, 9, 10)
- Paul Angelli – second engineer (1–3, 6, 9, 10)
- Patrick Dillett – second engineer (1–3, 6, 9, 10)
- Budd Tunick – production manager (1–3, 6, 9, 10)
- Dave Cook – engineer (4, 5, 7, 8)
- Martin Kunitz – assistant engineer (4, 5, 7, 8)
- Bob Ludwig – mastering
- The B-52's – cover concept
- Manhattan Design – cover concept, design
- Virginia Liberatore – photography
- Christoph Lanzenberg – cinematographer
- Tokyo – hair
- Kachin – styling
- Chris Isles – dresses
- Alpana Bawa – dresses
- Arthur Koby – earrings

== Charts ==
=== Weekly charts ===
| Chart (1989-90) | Peak position |
|---|---|
| Australian Albums (ARIA) | 1 |
| Canada Top Albums/CDs (RPM) | 8 |
| Dutch Albums (Album Top 100) | 70 |
| German Albums (Offizielle Top 100) | 25 |
| New Zealand Albums (RMNZ) | 1 |
| Swedish Albums (Sverigetopplistan) | 38 |
| UK Albums (Official Charts) | 8 |
| US Billboard 200 | 4 |

| Chart (2019) | Peak position |
|---|---|
| Belgian Albums (Ultratop Flanders) | 152 |
| Hungarian Albums (MAHASZ) | 32 |
| Scottish Albums (Official Charts) | 79 |

=== Year-end charts ===
| Chart (1990) | Peak position |
|---|---|
| Australian Albums (ARIA) | 25 |
| US Billboard 200 | 9 |

== Certifications ==
| Region | Certification | Certified units/sales |
|---|---|---|
| Australia (ARIA) | 2× Platinum | 140,000^{^} |
| Canada (Music Canada) | Platinum | 100,000^{^} |
| New Zealand (RMNZ) | Platinum | 15,000^{^} |
| United Kingdom (BPI) | Platinum | 300,000^{^} |
| United States (RIAA) | 4× Platinum | 4,000,000^{^} |
^{^} Shipments figures based on certification alone.
