= (Shake That) Cosmic Thing =

Promotional single by the B-52's

from the album Earth Girls Are Easy (soundtrack) and Cosmic Thing
- Released: May 1989
- Recorded: 1988
- Genre: Rock
- Length: 3:50
- Label: Warner Bros.
- Songwriters: Kate Pierson; Fred Schneider; Keith Strickland; Cindy Wilson
- Producer: Nile Rodgers

The B-52's singles chronology
"Wig" (1987)	"(Shake That) Cosmic Thing" (1989)	"Channel Z" (1989)

"(Shake That) Cosmic Thing" (also known only as "Cosmic Thing") is a song by American rock band the B-52's, released as a promotional single from the soundtrack to the film Earth Girls Are Easy and the band's fifth studio album Cosmic Thing.

The music video for the song consists of live footage from an August 17, 1990 concert live from the Shoreline Amphitheatre, in Mountain View, California.

== Charts ==
Chart (1989)	Peak position
US Alternative Airplay (Billboard)	7
