= Good Stuff =

Studio album by the B-52's
- Released: June 23, 1992
- Recorded: November 1991 – March 1992
- Studios: Power Station (New York City); Skyline (New York City); Right Track (New York City); Bearsville (Woodstock); Ocean Way (Hollywood)
- Genres: Pop rock; alternative rock
- Length: 56:01
- Label: Reprise
- Producers: Nile Rodgers (tracks 1, 4, 5, 7, 8); Don Was (tracks 2, 3, 6, 9, 10)

The B-52's chronology
| Cosmic Thing (1989) | Good Stuff (1992) | Time Capsule: Songs for a Future Generation (1998) |

Singles from Good Stuff
- 1. "Good Stuff" Released: June 1992; 2. "Is That You Mo-Dean?" Released: August 1992; 3. "Tell It Like It T-I-Is" Released: November 1992; 4. "Revolution Earth" Released: February 1993; 5. "Hot Pants Explosion" Released: May 1993 (Germany and UK)

Good Stuff is the sixth studio album by American new wave band the B-52's, released in 1992 by Reprise Records. It was conceived after the band's manager urged them to quickly issue a follow-up to their highly successful album Cosmic Thing (1989); it was created without founding member Cindy Wilson, who was on a temporary hiatus. The album peaked at No. 16 on the Billboard 200 and its title track peaked at No. 28 on the Billboard Hot 100. Good Stuff was nominated for Best Alternative Music Album at the 35th Annual Grammy Awards.

== Background ==
Good Stuff was created in the wake of the departure of B-52's singer and founding member Cindy Wilson, who left the band after an Earth Day performance in Central Park in 1990. The band were just finishing up 18 months of touring, following the massive success of their 1989 album, Cosmic Thing. Wilson would ultimately be absent from the band from 1990 to 1994, taking a hiatus to raise children, and later stated, "My clock was ticking, so I chose to take some time off." Wilson said that another reason for her departure was that she still missed her brother Ricky Wilson, the band's former guitarist who died in 1985; she also "needed to step back and chill." Fred Schneider recalled, "All of a sudden she just decided she was quitting ... so it was real stressful. It was a real shock." However, the band continued with Wilson's blessing and eventually hired Julee Cruise to tour as a vocalist with the band.

Guitarist Keith Strickland later stated that Good Stuff came about when the band's management pushed them to record a quick follow-up to capitalize on the success of Cosmic Thing, despite them being "burnt out" and "exhausted" from touring. Like Cosmic Thing, Good Stuff was produced jointly by Nile Rodgers and Don Was.

== Commercial performance ==
The title track, "Good Stuff", was issued as the lead single and peaked at No. 28 on the Billboard Hot 100, charting for 13 weeks. The album charted for 15 weeks, peaking at No. 16 on the Billboard 200, and went on to be nominated for the Grammy Award for Best Alternative Music Album at the 35th Annual Grammy Awards, losing to Tom Waits's Bone Machine.

== Critical reception ==
Professional ratings
Review scores
| Source | Rating |
|---|---|
| AllMusic | 2/5 stars |
| Calgary Herald | B− |
| Robert Christgau | (choice cut) |
| Entertainment Weekly | C |
| Orlando Sentinel | 1/3 stars |
| Rolling Stone | 3/5 stars |
| Spin Alternative Record Guide | 6/10 |

David Browne of Entertainment Weekly felt the album "reduces their sound to a dull formula", and that "their attempts to keep the party going ... sound more forced than ever", although he cited "Revolution Earth" as the highlight. Elysa Gardner of Rolling Stone found the work of the two producers "impressively seamless", citing "Dreamland" and "Bad Influence" as highlights, and added that "[Kate] Pierson's richly textured vocals hold up just fine on their own" in light of the absence of Cindy Wilson.

In a retrospective review for AllMusic, Stephen Thomas Erlewine thought the title track "was a transparent attempt to recapture the good vibes of 'Love Shack'" that "didn't succeed" but "did have the distinction of being the best single pulled from Good Stuff."

== Track listing ==
All tracks written by the B-52's, except where noted.

1. "Tell It Like It T-I-Is" – 5:13
2. "Hot Pants Explosion" – 4:55
3. "Good Stuff" – 5:58
4. "Revolution Earth" (Kate Pierson, Keith Strickland, Robert Waldrop) – 5:48
5. "Dreamland" – 7:35
6. "Is That You Mo-Dean?" – 5:32
7. "The World's Green Laughter" (Strickland) – 4:04
8. "Vision of a Kiss" – 5:57
9. "Breezin'" – 5:21
10. "Bad Influence" – 5:41

== Personnel ==
The B-52's

- Kate Pierson – vocals
- Fred Schneider – vocals (1–6, 8–10)
- Keith Strickland – guitars (1–6, 8–10), vocals (3, 8), keyboards (4–10), drum programming (7)

Additional musicians

- Richard Hilton – acoustic piano (1), keyboards (1, 4–5, 7–8), Synclavier programming (7)
- Pat Irwin – acoustic piano (2), Hammond B3 organ (2), keyboards (3, 6, 10), guitars (10)
- Jamie Muhoberac – keyboards (2–3, 6, 9–10)
- Tracy Wormworth – bass (1, 4–5, 8)
- Nile Rodgers – guitars (8)
- Don Was – guitars (10)
- James "Hutch" Hutchinson – bass (2, 10)
- Sara Lee – bass (3, 6)
- Nicky Brown – bass (9)
- Sterling Campbell – drums (1, 4–5, 8)
- Jeff Porcaro – drums (2, 9–10)
- Zachary Alford – drums (3, 6)
- Lenny Castro – percussion (2–3, 6, 9–10)
- Stephen "Doc" Kupka – baritone saxophone (2, 6)
- Dave McMurray – saxophone (2, 6), flute (9)
- Lee Thornburg – trumpet (2)
- Amy Shulman – harp (6)
- Tawatha Agee – backing vocals (1)
- Michelle Cobbs – backing vocals (1)
- Curtis King – backing vocals (1)
- Fonzi Thornton – backing vocals (1)
- Brenda White-King – backing vocals (1)
- Mo-Dean Intergalactic Choir – choir (6)

Technical

- Nile Rodgers – producer (1, 4–5, 7–8)
- Don Was – producer (2–3, 6, 9–10)
- Tom Durack – mixing, engineer (1, 4–5, 7–8), recording (2–3, 6, 9–10)
- Ed Cherney – recording (2–3, 6, 9–10)
- Jon Goldberger – additional engineer (1, 4–5, 7–8)
- Pat Dillett – additional engineer (2–3, 6, 9–10)
- Rik Pekkonen – additional engineer (2–3, 6, 9–10)
- Victor Deyglio – assistant engineer (1, 4–5, 7–8)
- Hiro Ishihara – assistant engineer (1, 4–5, 7–8)
- Justin Luchter – assistant engineer (1, 4–5, 7–8)
- Dan Bosworth – assistant engineer (2–3, 6, 9–10)
- Brian Pollack – assistant engineer (2–3, 6, 9–10)
- Mike Reither – assistant engineer (2–3, 6, 9–10)
- Scott Hull – digital editing at Masterdisk (New York City, New York)
- Doug Redler – technical coordinator
- Artie Smith – drum technician
- Bob Ludwig – mastering at Masterdisk (New York City, New York)
- Budd Tunick – production manager (1, 4–5, 7–8)
- Marsha Burns – production coordinator (2–3, 6, 9–10)
- Renoda Campbell-Monza – project coordinator
- The B-52's – art direction, cover concept
- Tom Recchion – art direction, design, cover concept
- Janet Perr – design
- Cecil Juanarena – computer imaging
- Robert Waldrop – handlettering
- Josef Astor – photography, booklet photography
- Jay Gullixson – additional photography
- Charlie Welch – additional photography
- Laura Levine – booklet photography
- Robert Molnar – booklet photography
- Chip Simons – booklet photography
- Doug Perrine – manatee photo
- Lady Bunny – PETA photo
- Joe McDevittt – make-up
- Koko – make-up
- Patti Wilson – stylist
- Roland Beauchamp – hair stylist
- Alpina Bowa – clothing designer
- Angel Zimick – clothing designer
- Ted Meuhling – jewelry

== Charts ==
Chart performance for Good Stuff
| Chart (1992) | Peak position |
|---|---|
| Australian Albums (ARIA) | 36 |
| Canada Top Albums/CDs (RPM) | 21 |
| Dutch Albums (Album Top 100) | 45 |
| Finnish Albums (The Official Finnish Charts) | 13 |
| German Albums (Offizielle Top 100) | 22 |
| New Zealand Albums (RMNZ) | 14 |
| Swedish Albums (Sverigetopplistan) | 36 |
| Swiss Albums (Schweizer Hitparade) | 26 |
| UK Albums (Official Charts) | 8 |
| US Billboard 200 | 16 |

== Certifications ==
| Region | Certification | Certified units/sales |
|---|---|---|
| United Kingdom (BPI) | Silver | 60,000^{^} |
| United States (RIAA) | Gold | 500,000^{^} |
^{^} Shipments figures based on certification alone.
