= Bouncing Off the Satellites =

Studio album by the B-52's
- Released: September 8, 1986
- Recorded: July 1985
- Studios: Sigma Sound, New York City
- Genres: New wave; synth-pop
- Length: 45:55
- Labels: Island; Warner Bros.
- Producer: Tony Mansfield

The B-52's chronology
Whammy! (1983)	Bouncing Off the Satellites (1986)	Cosmic Thing (1989)

Singles from Bouncing Off the Satellites
- 1. "Summer of Love" Released: 1986; 2. "Girl from Ipanema Goes to Greenland" Released: 1986 (US and Australia); 3. "Wig" Released: 1987 (UK and Philippines)

Bouncing Off the Satellites is the fourth studio album by American new wave band the B-52's, released on September 8, 1986, by Warner Bros. (US) and Island Records (Europe, Japan). It was recorded in July 1985 and was produced by Tony Mansfield. It is the band's first release since the death of guitarist Ricky Wilson, who died of AIDS after most of the work on the album was completed, but a year prior to its release. The band had gone on hiatus by the time Bouncing Off the Satellites was released, and it took three years for the band to recover from Wilson's death and release their next studio album, Cosmic Thing. It is the band's final album to be recorded as a five-piece, as the band chose not to officially replace Wilson. Keith Strickland changed from drums to guitar and the band continued as a four-piece. Since then, the band has relied on various session/touring musicians to handle drumming duties.

== Recording ==
Bouncing Off the Satellites was recorded in July 1985.

According to Kate Pierson, "Wig" was written and recorded after the band's label, Warner Bros., asked them to write a hit song for the album. The band had the title in mind for years and devised the song via a jam session.

A backwards message was deliberately inserted into the song "Detour Thru Your Mind": in the last 30 seconds of the track, Fred Schneider says, "I buried my parakeet in the backyard. Oh no, you're playing the record backwards. Watch out, you might ruin your needle."

=== Death of Ricky Wilson ===
During the recording, guitarist Ricky Wilson was suffering from AIDS. Keith Strickland was the only bandmate who was informed of Wilson's illness. Strickland later stated that Wilson "was very protective, particularly of Cindy and his family", due to the public's misconceptions about AIDS.

On October 12, 1985, Wilson succumbed to the illness, at the age of 32. Pierson has stated that Wilson worked on the album in its entirety prior to his death, and that it was completed. Strickland later recalled, "After Ricky Wilson died, we felt that the band was finished. We couldn't imagine continuing without him. So, we each went our separate ways." The band took a hiatus from their musical careers until they reformed in 1988 for the recording of their next studio album, Cosmic Thing.

== Release and promotion ==
The album was released on September 8, 1986. Devastated at Wilson's death, the band did not tour and were involved in minimal promotion for the album. However, the band did produce a music video for "Girl from Ipanema Goes to Greenland", which Schneider has stated was both "bittersweet" and the best video they ever made.

Pierson later stated, "Warner Bros. figured since we weren't touring after Ricky died that they would just not promote the record. We all went through so many changes—especially without touring, and the record just dropped like a stone—and we all dealt with our grief." Pierson also theorized that the label did not promote the album because the band stated they had no intention of hiring a new guitar player to replace Wilson, thus the label assumed the band would not continue on without him. However, on August 5, 1987, the band appeared on the British ITV show Hold Tight!, miming to the song "Wig", with Strickland now on guitar and Ralph Carney credited on-screen for drums. Carney had previously played saxophone on the B-52's' Mesopotamia (1982) and Whammy! (1983) releases, and had subsequently toured with the band.

== Reception ==
=== Commercial ===
Despite the relative lack of promotion, "Summer of Love" was released as the lead single and initially received a considerable amount of airplay from some radio stations, managing to peak at No. 3 on the Billboard Dance Club Songs chart. Pierson later recalled that Warner Bros. employee Steve Baker had tried to get the label to promote the album in light of the single's success, to no avail. Subsequently, the album only reached No. 85 on the Billboard 200 chart.

=== Critical ===
Professional ratings
Review scores
Source	Rating
AllMusic	2/5 stars
PopMatters	6/10
The Rolling Stone Album Guide	2/5 stars
Select	3/5
Sounds	2/5 stars
Spin Alternative Record Guide	7/10
The Village Voice	B+

Robert Christgau of The Village Voice felt Pierson's and Cindy Wilson's contributions to the album were "watercolors posing as Kenny Scharfs—not only don't 'Summer of Love' and 'She Brakes for Rainbows' redeem anybody's '60s retro, they don't even take off on it", adding that "Fred's abrasive camp saves the day". Trouser Press opined, "The first side is entirely delightful, filled with such classic B-52 silliness as 'Wig,' 'Detour Thru Your Mind' and 'Girl from Ipanema Goes to Greenland,' but the flip is overly smooth, limp and uninspired."

In a retrospective review for AllMusic, Stephen Thomas Erlewine stated, "Considering their loss, it's not surprising that the B-52's don't sound entirely focused throughout the record", adding that "There are so many musicians on the record that it winds up sounding too carefully considered -- the polar opposite of the loose, inspired fun of their early work." Similarly, in The New Rolling Stone Album Guide (2004), J.D. Considine felt the album "flops miserably" and sounds "hollow and contrived", due to the addition of session players. Rich Wilhelm of PopMatters called the album "wistful" and "subdued", concluding that it is "the most subtle of the B-52s' albums, with the loss of Ricky Wilson adding to the album's poignancy." The Spectator felt the album is darker and more melancholy than the band's previous work. Brian Cullman in Spin described the album as "clean, well-manicured, and dull".

== Track listing ==
All tracks are written by the B-52's, except where noted.

Side one
No.	Title	Writer(s)	Vocal	Length
1.	"Summer of Love"	Kate Pierson; Keith Strickland; Cindy Wilson; Ricky Wilson	Pierson; C. Wilson	4:02
2.	"Girl from Ipanema Goes to Greenland"	Strickland; C. Wilson; R. Wilson	C. Wilson	4:22
3.	"Housework"	Pierson; Tim Rollins	Pierson	4:04
4.	"Detour Thru Your Mind"		Pierson; Schneider	5:06
5.	"Wig"		Pierson; Schneider; C. Wilson	4:22

Side two
No.	Title	Writer(s)	Vocal	Length
1.	"Theme for a Nude Beach"		Pierson; Schneider; Strickland; C. Wilson; R. Wilson	4:50
2.	"Ain't It a Shame"	Strickland; C. Wilson; R. Wilson	C. Wilson	5:30
3.	"Juicy Jungle"	Fred Schneider (lyrics); John Coté (music)	Schneider	4:50
4.	"Communicate"		Pierson; Schneider; C. Wilson	4:08
5.	"She Brakes for Rainbows"	Strickland; R. Wilson	C. Wilson	4:41
Total length:				45:55

== Personnel ==
The B-52's

- Cindy Wilson – vocals (1–2, 4–7, 9–10)
- Kate Pierson – vocals (1, 3–6, 9), organ (3)
- Fred Schneider – vocals (4–6, 8–9)
- Ricky Wilson – guitars (1–2, 7, 9), bass (4–6), vocals (6), backing vocals (7)
- Keith Strickland – bass (1, 2, 9, 10), keyboards (2, 4, 6–7, 9–10), guitars (3–7), percussion (3), sitar (5), vocals (6), harmonica (7), backing vocals (7, 10)

Additional musicians

- Tony Mansfield – Fairlight CMI (all tracks)
- Mark Mazur – guitars (3), bass (3)
- Tim Rollins – guitars (3)
- John Coté – all other instruments (8), backing vocals (8)
- Tom Beckerman – lead guitar (8)

Technical

- Tony Mansfield – producer
- Shep Pettibone – additional production (1, 2), remixing (1)
- Michael Hutchinson – engineer (1)
- Steve Peck – engineer (2)
- Tony Phillips – engineer (3–10)
- Fernando Kral – assistant engineer
- Don Peterkofsky – assistant engineer
- Phil Brown – mastering
- Andrea Starr – coordinator
- Matthew Murphy – coordinator
- Pat Sabatino – coordinator
- Keith Strickland – back cover photography
- Kenny Scharf – front cover painting
- Keith Bennett/Kav Deluxe – art direction

== Charts ==
Chart (1986-87)	Peak position
Australian Albums (Kent Music Report)	73
New Zealand Albums (RMNZ)	50
UK Albums (Official Charts)	74
US Billboard 200	85
