= Roam =

1989 single by the B-52's

Single by the B-52's

from the album Cosmic Thing
- B-side: "Bushfire"
- Released: 1989
- Studio: Skyline (New York City)
- Genre: Pop
- Length: 4:54 (album version); 4:05 (single edit)
- Label: Reprise
- Composer: The B-52's
- Lyricist: Robert Waldrop
- Producer: Nile Rodgers

The B-52's singles chronology
"Love Shack" (1989)	"Roam" (1989)	"Deadbeat Club" (1990)

Music video
- "Roam" on YouTube

"Roam" is a song by American new wave band the B-52's released as the third single from their fifth studio album, Cosmic Thing (1989). The vocals are sung by Kate Pierson and Cindy Wilson. The B-52's worked with a co-writer, Robert Waldrop, who penned the lyrics. Released as a single in 1989, "Roam" peaked at number three on the US Billboard Hot 100 and entered the top 10 in Canada, Ireland, and New Zealand.

== Release ==
The "Roam" single was released with a variety of remixes as well as live tracks recorded at Cleveland Music Hall.

== Reception ==
"Roam" became the band's second and final US top-10 hit, peaking at number three on the Billboard Hot 100 in March 1990 and spending 20 weeks on the chart. It was certified gold by the Recording Industry Association of America (RIAA) in April 1990. Worldwide, the song became a top-10 success in Canada, Ireland, and New Zealand, peaking at numbers four, nine, and two, respectively. In February 1991, the B-52's were nominated for a Grammy Award for Best Pop Vocal Performance by a Duo or Group for "Roam".

== Music video ==
The music video for "Roam" was directed by Adam Bernstein and produced by Jonna Mattingly, with Zack Winestine serving as the director of photography. Filmed in New York City, the video contains plentiful animations and stock footage.

== Track listings ==
US maxi-CD single

1. "Roam" (7-inch remix) – 5:11
2. "Roam" (radio mix) – 4:13
3. "Roam" (12-inch remix) – 8:17
4. "Bushfire" (LP version) – 4:56
5. "Roam" (extended remix) – 5:25
6. "Roam" (instrumental) – 5:27

US and Australian 12-inch single

A1. "Roam" (extended remix) – 5:27
A2. "Roam" (instrumental) – 5:25
B1. "Roam" (12-inch remix) – 8:17
B2. "Bushfire" (LP version) – 4:56

US 7-inch and cassette single

A. "Roam" (edit) – 4:05
B. "Bushfire" (LP version) – 4:56

UK 7-inch, CD, and cassette single

1. "Roam" (edit)
2. "Whammy Kiss" (live)
3. "Dance This Mess Around" (live)

UK 12-inch single

A1. "Roam" (radio mix) – 4:13
A2. "Roam" (12-inch remix) – 8:17
B1. "Roam" (12-inch extended mix) – 5:25

== Credits and personnel ==
Credits are lifted from the Cosmic Thing album booklet.

Studios

- Recorded digitally and mixed analog at Skyline Studios (New York City)
- Mastered at Masterdisk (New York City)

Personnel

- The B-52's – music
  - Fred Schneider
  - Cindy Wilson – vocals
  - Kate Pierson – vocals
  - Keith Strickland – guitar
- Robert Waldrop – lyrics
- Sara Lee – bass guitar
- Richard Hilton – keyboard, programming
- Leroy Clouden – drums
- Nile Rodgers – production, mixing
- Budd Tunick – production management
- Tom Durack – mixing, engineering
- Ed Brooks – second engineering
- Keith Freedman – second engineering
- Paul Angelli – second engineering
- Patrick Dillett – second engineering
- Bob Ludwig – mastering

== Charts ==
=== Weekly charts ===
Chart (1989–1990)	Peak position
Australia (ARIA)	11
Canada Top Singles (RPM)	4
Canada Dance/Urban (RPM)	13
Europe (Eurochart Hot 100)	40
Germany (GfK)	40
Ireland (IRMA)	9
Luxembourg (Radio Luxembourg)	12
New Zealand (Recorded Music NZ)	2
UK Singles (Official Charts)	17
US Billboard Hot 100	3
US Alternative Airplay (Billboard)	6
US Dance Club Songs (Billboard)	10
US Dance Singles Sales (Billboard)	10
US Cash Box Top 100	3

=== Year-end charts ===
Chart (1990)	Position
Australia (ARIA)	68
Canada Top Singles (RPM)	45
New Zealand (RIANZ)	45
US Billboard Hot 100	40
US Modern Rock Tracks (Billboard)	25
US Cash Box Top 100	36

== Certifications ==
Region	Certification	Certified units/sales
Australia (ARIA)	Gold	35,000^{^}
United States (RIAA)	Gold	500,000^{^}
^{^} Shipments figures based on certification alone.

== Release history ==
Region	Date	Format(s)	Label(s)	Ref.
United States	1989	7-inch vinyl; 12-inch vinyl; CD; cassette	Reprise	
Australia	February 5, 1990	7-inch vinyl; 12-inch vinyl; cassette	Reprise	
Australia	March 26, 1990	CD	Reprise	
Japan	April 25, 1990	Mini-album (with "Love Shack")	Reprise	

== Cover versions ==
In 2023 the Bonvoy loyalty program for Marriott International released a series of ads featuring re-recorded and remixed versions of the song as part of their "Roam Around the World" campaign. The songs were produced by W Hotels Global music director Leah Chisholm (aka LP Giobbi) and featured vocals by Amelia Rae.
