= Deadbeat Club =

1990 single by the B-52's

Single by the B-52's

from the album Cosmic Thing
- Released: January 1990
- Length: 4:45
- Label: Reprise
- Songwriter: The B-52's
- Producer: Nile Rodgers

The B-52's singles chronology
"Roam" (1989)	"Deadbeat Club" (1990)	"Good Stuff" (1992)

"Deadbeat Club" is a song written and performed by American new wave band the B-52's. The song was released as the fifth and final single from their fifth studio album, Cosmic Thing (1989). The song peaked at No. 30 on the US Billboard Hot 100, No. 21 on the New Zealand Singles Chart, No. 35 on the Canadian RPM 100 Singles chart, and No. 73 on the Australian Singles Chart in 1990.

== Background ==
The song is about the band's early days in Athens when they would hang around in cafes drinking coffee. Because they did not work or do anything, their parents nicknamed them "Deadbeats". Allen's, mentioned in the nostalgic song, was a real-life place in Athens, Georgia. Normaltown is a neighborhood of Athens. The music video features R.E.M. frontman Michael Stipe.

== Track listing ==
CD and 12-inch single

1. "Deadbeat Club" – 4:48
2. "Love Shack" – 5:20
3. "B-52's Megamix" – 6:32

== Charts ==
Chart (1990)	Peak position
Argentina (CAPIF)	5
Australia (ARIA)	73
Canada Top Singles (RPM)	35
New Zealand (Recorded Music NZ)	21
US Billboard Hot 100	30
US Cash Box Top 100	27
