= The B-52s =

American rock band

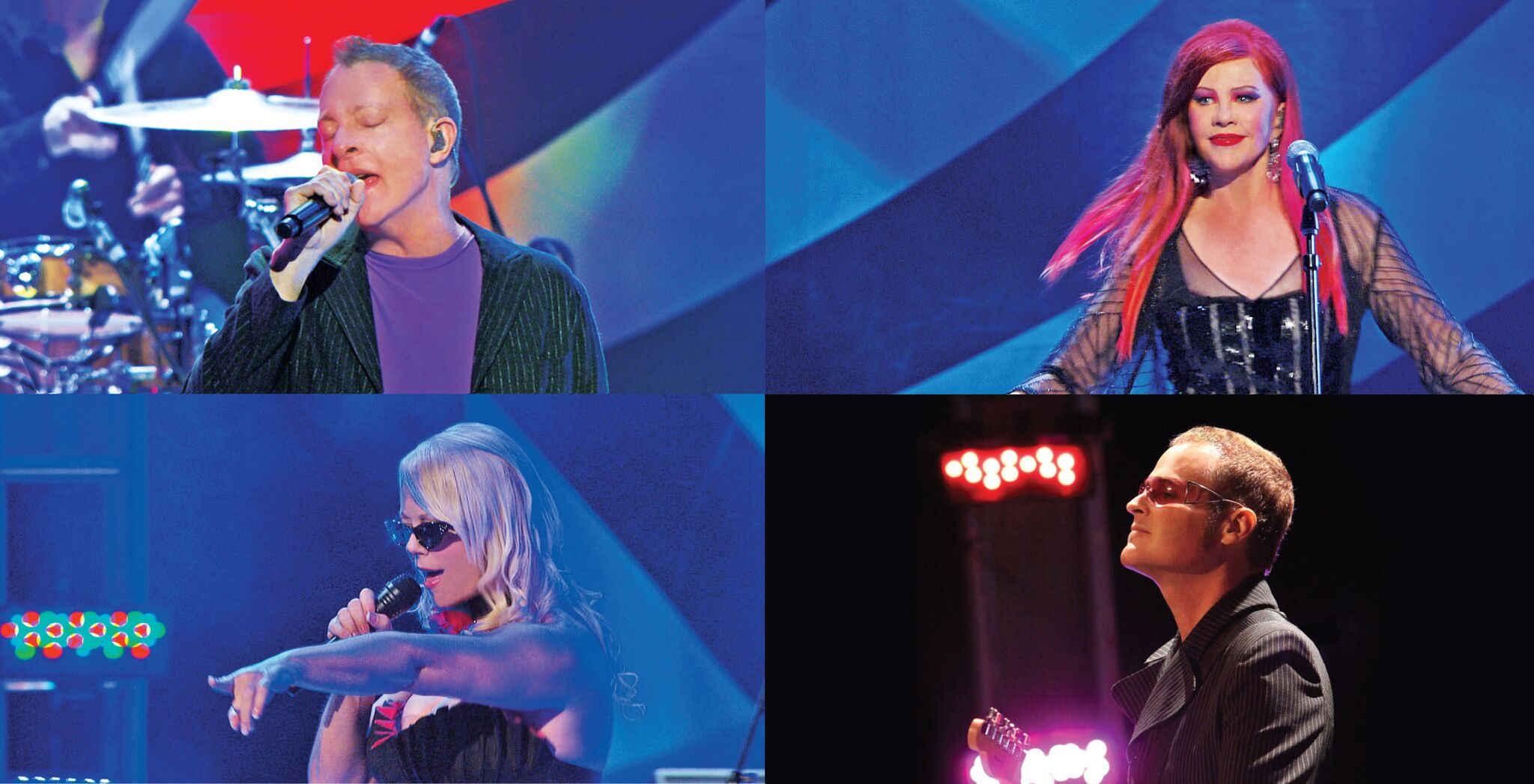
- The B-52s performing live in 2011. Left to right, top to bottom: Fred Schneider, Kate Pierson, Cindy Wilson, Keith Strickland.

Background information
- Origin: Athens, Georgia, U.S.
- Genres: New wave; dance-rock; art pop; post-punk (early)
- Works: Discography
- Years active: 1976–present
- Labels: Island; Warner Bros.; Reprise; Go!; Astralwerks
- Members: Kate Pierson; Fred Schneider; Keith Strickland; Cindy Wilson
- Past members: Ricky Wilson
- Website: theb52s.com

The B-52s (Note: Originally presented as The B-52's, with a superfluous apostrophe, until 2008.) are an American rock band formed in Athens, Georgia, in 1976. The original lineup consisted of Fred Schneider (vocals, percussion), Kate Pierson (vocals, keyboards, synthesizer bass), Cindy Wilson (vocals, percussion), Ricky Wilson (guitar, vocals), and Keith Strickland (drums, guitar, keyboards, vocals). Ricky Wilson died of AIDS-related illness in 1985, and Strickland permanently switched from drums to lead guitar. The band has also added various auxiliary members for albums and live performances.

The B-52s have had many hits, including "Rock Lobster", "Planet Claire", "Party Out of Bounds", "Private Idaho", "Whammy Kiss", "Summer of Love", "Wig", "Love Shack", "Roam", "Funplex", and "(Meet) The Flintstones". They have been nominated for three Grammy Awards, twice for Best Pop Performance by a Duo or Group in 1990 and 1991, and for Best Alternative Music Album in 1992. A 2023 Las Vegas residency was announced in November 2022.

The group evoked a "thrift-shop aesthetic", in Bernard Gendron's words, by drawing from 1950s and 1960s pop music, rock-and-roll, and camp/kitsch culture. Schneider, Pierson, and Wilson sometimes use call-and-response-style vocals (Schneider's often humorous and camp Sprechgesang contrasting with Wilson and Pierson's melodic harmonies), and their guitar- and keyboard-driven instrumentation is their trademark sound, which was also set apart from their contemporaries by the unusual guitar tunings Ricky Wilson used on their earlier albums.

== History ==
=== 1976–1979: Formation and early years ===
The group formed in 1976 when Cindy Wilson, Ricky Wilson (her elder brother), Pierson, Strickland, and Schneider held an impromptu jam session after sharing a flaming volcano drink at a Chinese restaurant in Athens, Georgia. When they first jammed, Strickland played guitar and Ricky Wilson played congas. They later played their first concert (with Wilson on guitar) in 1977, on North Milledge Avenue in Athens, at a Valentine's Day party for their friends. The venue later became a private residence.

The name "B-52s" comes from a particular beehive hairdo resembling the nose cone of the aircraft, which Pierson and Cindy Wilson wore in performances during the band's first decade. Other names the band considered were the Tina-Trons and Fellini's Children. Strickland suggested the name after a dream he had of a band performing in a hotel lounge. In the dream, he heard someone whisper in his ear that the band's name was "the B-52s".

The band's quirky take on the new-wave sound of its era was a combination of dance and surf music set apart from their contemporaries by thrift-store chic and the unusual guitar tunings Ricky Wilson used.

The band's first single, "Rock Lobster", recorded for DB Records in 1978, was an underground success, selling over 2,000 copies, which led to gigs at CBGB and Max's Kansas City in New York City. Both this version of "Rock Lobster" and its B-side, "52 Girls", are different recordings from those that appear on the band's 1979 debut album and the early version of "52 Girls" is in a different key.

The re-recorded version of "Rock Lobster" was also released as a single, and in the UK and Germany, it was backed with an instrumental version of "Running Around", a non-album track at the time. (A vocal re-recording of this appears on the band's second album, 1980's Wild Planet.) The buzz the record created in the UK meant their first show in London at the Electric Ballroom was packed and attended by UK pop stars, including Sandie Shaw, Green Gartside from Scritti Politti, and Joe Jackson. In Canada, released on the Warner Bros. label, the single went from cult hit to number one on the RPM-compiled national chart on May 24, 1980. John Lennon credited the song with inspiring his return to writing music.

=== 1979–1982: The B-52s, Wild Planet, and Mesopotamia ===
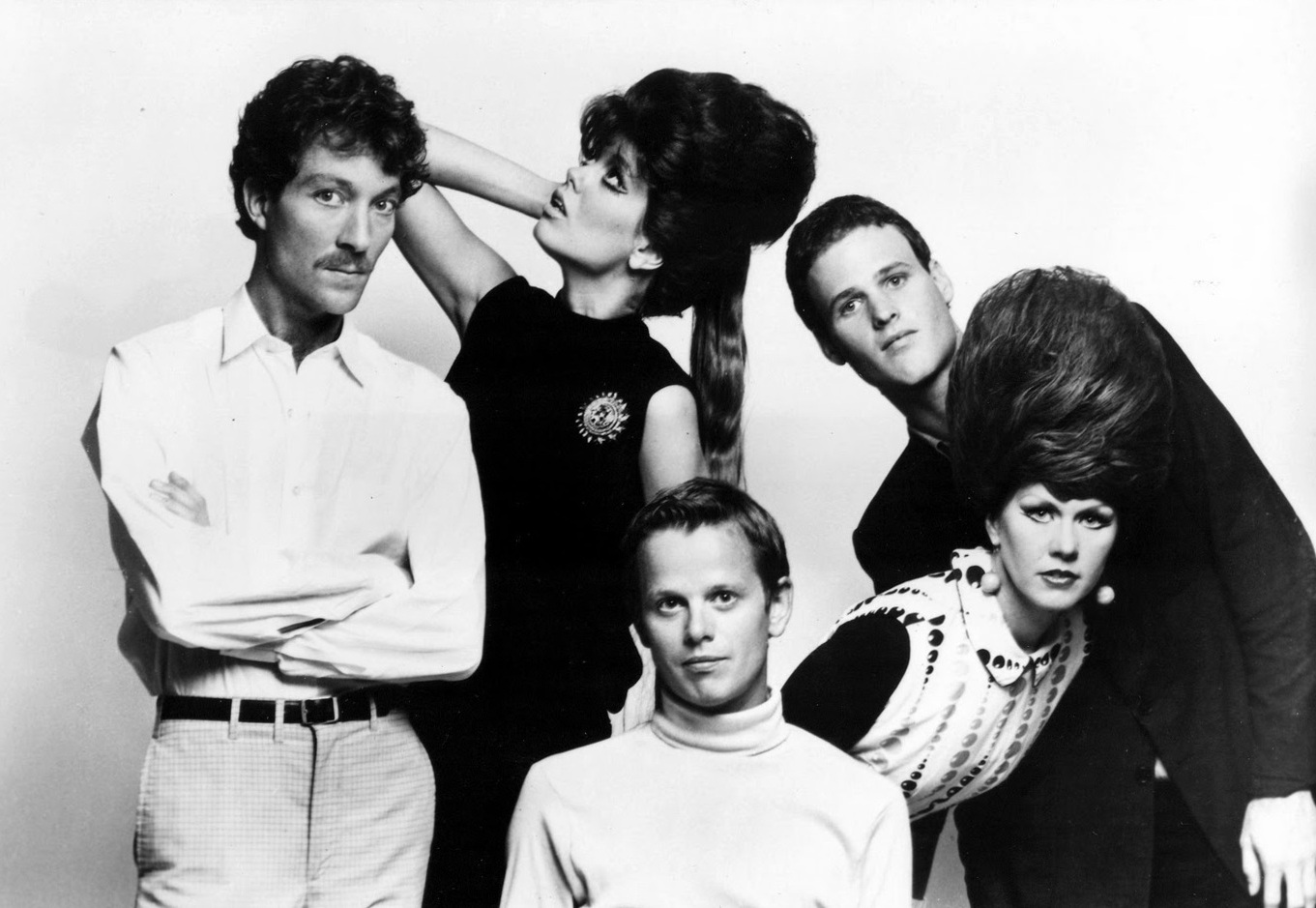
The B-52s in a 1980 publicity shot

In 1979, the B-52s signed contracts as they flew over to Compass Point Studios in Nassau, Bahamas, to record their debut studio album, with Island Records founder Chris Blackwell producing. The band was surprised by Blackwell's recording methods; he wanted to keep the sound as close as possible to its live sound, so he used almost no overdubs or additional effects.

Released on July 6, 1979, The B-52's (Note: In many European countries this album is also known as "Play Loud".) contained re-recorded versions of "Rock Lobster" and "52 Girls", six originals recorded solely for the album, and a cover of the Petula Clark hit "Downtown". The album was a major success, especially in Australia, where it reached number three on the charts alongside its three singles: "Planet Claire", "Rock Lobster", and "Dance This Mess Around". In the U.S., the single "Rock Lobster" reached the Billboard Hot 100 chart, while the album was certified platinum by the RIAA. In 1980, John Lennon called the B-52s his favorite band and specifically cited "Rock Lobster" as an inspiration for his album Double Fantasy (1980).

In April 1980, the B-52s returned to Compass Point Studios to record their next album. Several of the songs on the new album had been concert staples since 1978; the band did not record them for their first album, as they had more songs than could fit in a quality LP record. Rhett Davies co-produced the album, which had a more polished production sound than the debut.

Released on August 27, 1980, Wild Planet was well received by critics. It reached number 18 on the Billboard 200 chart in 1980 and was certified gold; "Private Idaho" became the band's second Hot 100 entry. The B-52s performed on Saturday Night Live on January 26, 1980, and at the Heatwave festival (promoted as the "New Wave Woodstock") near Toronto, Canada, in August 1980. The band also appeared in the Paul Simon film One-Trick Pony. In July 1981, Party Mix! was released, a six-song collection containing songs from the first two albums remixed and sequenced to form two long tracks, one on each side.

In 1981, the band collaborated with Talking Heads' David Byrne to produce a third full-length studio album. Reportedly due to differences with Byrne over the album's musical direction, recording sessions for the album were aborted, prompting the band to release Mesopotamia in 1982 as an EP. (In 1991, Party Mix! and Mesopotamia, the latter of which had been remixed, were combined and released together on a single compact disc.) Also in 1982, the band appeared at the inaugural US Festival, performing on the first day.

=== 1982–1987: Whammy!, Bouncing off the Satellites, and death of Ricky Wilson ===
In December 1982, the band began recording their third album, Whammy! According to Pierson, Strickland no longer wanted to play the drums, so the band switched to drum machines for this album, with Strickland and Ricky Wilson playing all the music on the album, and the rest of the band providing vocals only. Having originally played guitars, organ, bass guitar, and synthesizers, Pierson switched to a mainly vocal role in the studio, but remained behind the keyboards on tour. The band also began experimenting heavily with synthesizers during this period.

Released on April 27, 1983, Whammy! reached number 29 on the Billboard 200 chart. "Legal Tender" reached the Billboard Hot 100 chart, as well as the Billboard Hot Dance Club Play Singles chart alongside "Whammy Kiss" and "Song for a Future Generation". For the Whammy! tour, some tracks featured Strickland on the drums, while others used a backing track so Strickland could come forward and play other parts. This also freed up the vocalists (now sometimes not playing instruments) to perform some simple choreography. Copyright issues with Yoko Ono led to the cover song "Don't Worry" being removed from the album and replaced by "Moon 83"—a rearranged version of "There's a Moon in the Sky (Called the Moon)" from their debut album—on future pressings of Whammy!

Before the work on the next album, the band took a one-year break during which Fred Schneider released his debut solo album Fred Schneider and the Shake Society.

In January 1985, the B-52s performed in Brazil at Rock in Rio for their largest crowd ever. Later in the year, the band struggled to write new material for their next album. The band members all lived together in the same house and felt that collaboration was not working, so they decided to try to write songs separately and began recording in July 1985, again using drum machines and synthesizers extensively. During the recording, guitarist Wilson had been suffering from AIDS, though none of the other band members were aware of his illness except for Strickland, as Wilson "did not want anyone to worry about him or fuss about him." Wilson died from his illness on October 12, 1985, at the age of 32.

When the band returned to the studio, Strickland had learned how to play the guitar in Wilson's style and switched permanently to the new instrument, leaving session players to complete the rhythm section. The results were released on September 8, 1986, as Bouncing off the Satellites, a mixture of solo and group efforts. Because of Wilson's death, the band did not tour to promote the album. A music video was made for "Girl from Ipanema Goes to Greenland" and the band appeared on some UK television programs, but then took a two-year hiatus. Keith Strickland moved to Woodstock, New York, while Pierson and Schneider stayed in New York City. In 1987, the band released a public service announcement in the style of the Beatles' Sgt. Pepper's Lonely Hearts Club Band album cover on behalf of amfAR, The Foundation for AIDS Research.

=== 1988–1992: Comeback, Cosmic Thing, and Good Stuff ===
Strickland had been composing in 1988. After he played some of his new music for the other band members, they all agreed to try writing together again, with Pierson, Wilson, and Schneider contributing lyrics and melodies. In 1989, the band released Cosmic Thing, their mainstream breakthrough, on Reprise Records worldwide. The single "Channel Z" from the new album became an alternative and college radio hit, hitting number one on the U.S. Hot Modern Rock Tracks chart, receiving significant airplay on MTV's modern rock show 120 Minutes. They then embarked on the Cosmic Tour.

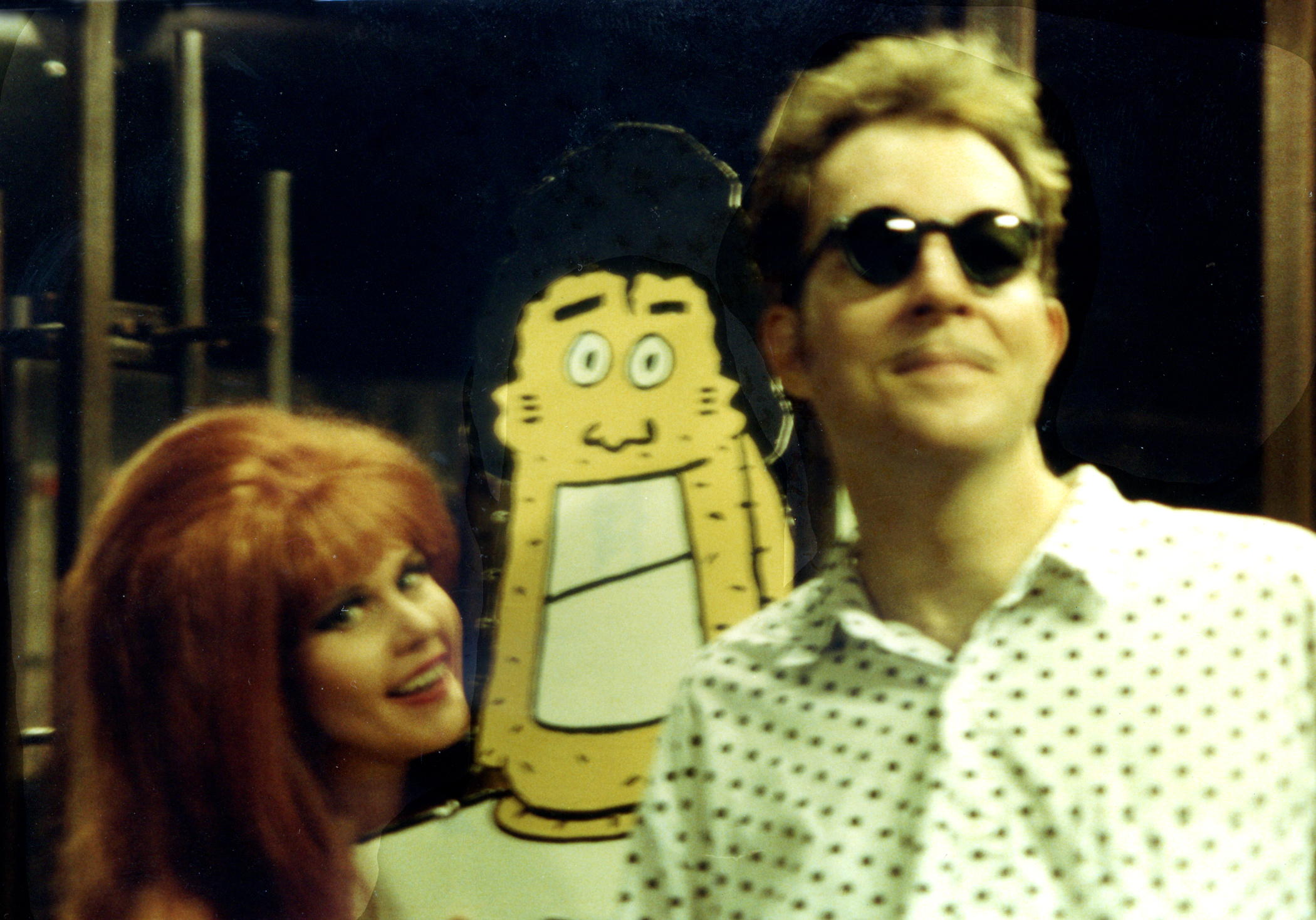
Pierson and Schneider in Boston during the Cosmic Thing tour, 1989

Their next single, "Love Shack", with its party vibe and colorful music video, became their first top 40 hit on the Billboard Hot 100, ultimately reaching number three in November 1989. That peak was matched in March 1990, when their follow-up single, "Roam", also reached number three. In Australia, the country that had most embraced the band a decade earlier, "Love Shack" remained at number one for eight weeks.

A fourth single, "Deadbeat Club", which reminisced about the band's early days in Athens and whose video was shot on location and featured a cameo by fellow Athens artist R.E.M.'s Michael Stipe, reached number 30. Cosmic Thing climbed into the U.S. top five and earned multiplatinum certification. The album also had international success, reaching number one in both Australia and New Zealand and number eight in the UK. The group had a successful world tour to support the record and appeared on the cover of Rolling Stone in March 1990. In 1990, the B-52s were nominated for four MTV Video Music Awards, including Video of the Year. They won two awards: Best Group Video and Best Art Direction.

Pierson sang on Iggy Pop's song "Candy", which gave him his first and only top-40 hit. In 1991, Schneider's 1984 solo record, Fred Schneider and the Shake Society, was repackaged and re-released, resulting in his first Hot 100 single when "Monster" climbed to number 85. Also that year, Pierson again guest-starred on a popular track, R.E.M.'s "Shiny Happy People", which reached number 10 in September. Pierson also appeared on two other songs from R.E.M.'s chart-topping album Out of Time: "Near Wild Heaven" and "Me in Honey", as well as the outtake "Fretless".

In late 1990, Cindy Wilson took time off from the band, with Julee Cruise filling in for her on tour. The B-52s released Good Stuff in 1992 as a trio—the only album release on which Cindy Wilson was not present—and the title track reached number 28 that August. The album made it to number 16 in the U.S. It is also the group's most overtly political album, though they had been activists and fundraisers for environmental, AIDS, and animal-rights causes for many years.

=== 1993–2007: Soundtrack appearances, 25th anniversary, and touring ===
The band had their next chart entry in 1994 when, as the BC-52's, they appeared in The Flintstones live-action movie and sang the title song. When released as a single, it reached number 33 in the U.S. and number three in the UK. In 1994, Pierson and Schneider also sang on the theme song for the Nickelodeon series Rocko's Modern Life from the second season onward. In the 1990s, former Duran Duran drummer Sterling Campbell joined the band, but left in 2000 to tour with David Bowie and was replaced that year by Zack Alford, who had recorded and toured with the band during the Cosmic Thing era. Pierson and Cindy Wilson recorded a cover of the McFadden & Whitehead song "Ain't No Stoppin' Us Now" for the 1996 film The Associate, starring Whoopi Goldberg. Wilson rejoined the B-52s the same year.

A career retrospective, Time Capsule: Songs for a Future Generation, appeared in 1998, along with two remixed maxisingles: "Summer of Love '98" and "Hallucinating Pluto". A major tour (with co-headliners the Pretenders) to promote the collection took place. "Debbie", another single from the album (a tribute to Blondie's Debbie Harry), placed number 35 on Billboard's Hot Modern Rock Tracks. In 1999, they recorded a parody of "Love Shack" called "Glove Slap" for an episode of The Simpsons. In 2000, they co-headlined another major tour with the Go-Go's and recorded the song "The Chosen One" for the movie Pokémon: The Movie 2000.

In 2002, a more extensive anthology, Nude on the Moon: The B-52's Anthology, was released, and in February of that year, the band held a series of concerts celebrating their 25th anniversary. The Irving Plaza show in New York City featured Yoko Ono, as well as Tina Weymouth and Chris Frantz of Talking Heads, as guests, with Chicks on Speed as the opener. Coinciding with the band's 25th anniversary was the publication of The B-52's Universe: The Essential Guide to the World's Greatest Party Band, the first and only officially authorized biography of the band. The book was nominated for a Lambda Lit Award and was a Minnesota Book Awards finalist. The B-52s recorded the song "Orange You Glad It's Summer" for a Target commercial that aired in spring/summer 2002. Target also used the Cosmic Thing song "Junebug" in a TV spot five years later. In late 2002, the pilot episode for the cartoon The Groovenians featured a theme song performed by the band.

In late 2004, the band opened for Cher on a few dates of her Farewell Tour. In March 2006, they opened for the Rolling Stones at a benefit for the Robin Hood Foundation. They had three remix EPs released by the Planet Clique record label: Whammy! in 2005, Mesopotamia in 2006, and Wild Planet in 2007. During this time, they appeared on many television shows, including The L Word, V.I.P., The Rosie O'Donnell Show, The Tonight Show with Jay Leno, the Late Show with David Letterman, The Arsenio Hall Show, Saturday Night Live, Live with Regis and Kelly, The Today Show, and Good Morning America, as well as numerous times on VH1.

=== 2008–2021: Funplex and continued touring ===
Prior to 2008, the band used an apostrophe in their name, rendering it as "the B-52's". In 2008, the band dropped the apostrophe to become "the B-52s". Asked about the change, Pierson said, "It was not grammatically correct. It's not like a possessive. It just seemed superfluous."

Funplex, the band's first original album in 16 years (since 1992's Good Stuff), was released on March 25, 2008, by Astralwerks. Talking about the record's sound, Strickland noted, "It's loud, sexy rock and roll with the beat turned up to hot pink." The album was produced by Steve Osborne, who was asked to work on the album based on his work with New Order on the album Get Ready (2001).

The album debuted at number 11 on the Billboard charts in the U.S., immediately making it the second-highest-charting B-52s album ever. The band toured in support of the album and made appearances on talk shows, including The Tonight Show and The Ellen DeGeneres Show, and performed on The Today Show on Memorial Day 2008. They also participated in the True Colors Tour 2008 with Cyndi Lauper and embarked on a European tour in July.

The first single from the album was "Funplex", which was released digitally on January 29, 2008, to the iTunes Store in the U.S. The second single lifted from the album was "Juliet of the Spirits". Schneider said in an interview that the album just broke even and could be the B-52s' last new studio album, though he later retracted that statement. The B-52s performed their hit track "Love Shack" with Sugarland at the 2009 CMT Music Awards.

On February 18, 2011, the B-52s played a show at the Classic Center in their hometown of Athens, Georgia, four days after the 34th anniversary of their first-ever show on February 14, 1977. The concert was filmed and recorded for With the Wild Crowd! Live in Athens, GA, released in October 2011.

The group continued to perform live, with a touring band that featured musicians Sterling Campbell (drums), Paul Gordon (keyboards, guitar), and Tracy Wormworth (bass), and performances included the closing show for the 2011 edition of the Montreal Jazz Festival, as well as being the house band during the 2012 TV Land Awards. At the end of 2012, Strickland announced he would no longer tour with the B-52s, though he would continue as a member of the band. Without Strickland, the B-52s continued to tour across the world with groups including the Go-Go's, Tears for Fears, the English Beat, the Psychedelic Furs, Simple Minds, Culture Club, and Tom Bailey. Aside from touring, the group covered the Squidbillies theme song during season 10 of the Adult Swim series and appeared as guests in the sketch comedy show Portlandia.

In 2019, the group announced a tour to begin in May in the United States, which took them to Europe and back to the U.S. On September 30, 2019, the band was reported to be featured in the upcoming Archie Comics' comic book Archie Meets the B-52s, released in February 2020.

=== 2022–present: Tour and Las Vegas residency ===
In April 2022, the group announced that they would embark on a final farewell tour, with KC and the Sunshine Band and DJ Cummerbund, lasting from August 22 to November 11, 2022. The final dates of the concert were postponed until January 2023, due to illness. The B-52s performed the final concert on their tour at the Classic Center in their hometown on January 10, 2023.

Following the end of the farewell tour, the B-52s embarked on residencies at The Venetian Las Vegas in Paradise, Nevada, with DJ Cummerbund again joining as an opener. The first residency concerts took place in May, August, and September 2023, with further dates scheduled for April 2024.

On May 15, 2024, the City of Athens, Georgia, announced that their Federal Prospects Hockey League team would be named the Rock Lobsters, honoring the band and their song. The decision came after an online poll, which the Rock Lobsters won by a wide margin. The band responded on social media, stating, "[W]e are truly honored to have our hometown hockey team named the Rock Lobsters. As the song declares, 'Let's rock!'"

The B-52s performed "Love Shack" at SNL50: The Homecoming Concert (2025) celebrating the 50th anniversary of the Saturday Night Live television show. They were joined on stage by Bowen Yang and Sarah Sherman and featured Fred Armisen on drums.

The B-52s toured with Devo on their North American Cosmic De-Evolution tour in 2025, with Lene Lovich as the opening act. The tour reached London and Manchester in June 2026 with guests Lovich and the Rezillos.

In July 2026, Kate Pierson and Fred Schneider were inducted onto the Count Basie Center for the Arts Walk of Fame.

The B-52s were honored with the 2,861st star on the Hollywood Walk of Fame on October 29, 2026, at 6212 Hollywood Boulevard in front of Amoeba Music. The B-52s received their star in the category of Recording.

== Awards and nominations ==
Award	Year	Nominee(s)	Category	Result	Ref.
CMT Music Awards	2010	"Love Shack" (with Sugarland)	Collaborative Video of the Year	Nominated	
CMT Music Awards	2010	"Love Shack" (with Sugarland)	CMT Performance of the Year	Nominated	

== Members ==
Current members

- Fred Schneider – vocals, percussion (1976–present), keyboards (1979)
- Kate Pierson – vocals, keyboards, percussion (1976–present), bass (1976–1989), guitars (1979)
- Keith Strickland – guitars, keyboards, programming, bass, backing vocals (1976–present; not touring since 2013), drums (1976–1985)
- Cindy Wilson – vocals, percussion (1976–1990, 1996–present), guitars (1979)

Former members

- Ricky Wilson – guitars, bass, keyboards, vocals (1976–1985; his death)

Current touring members

- Tracy Wormworth – bass (1992–present)
- Sterling Campbell – drums (1992–2002, 2007–present)
- Ken Maiuri – keyboards, guitars (2016–present)
- John Andrews – guitars (2023–present)

Former touring members

- Pat Irwin – keyboards, guitars (1989–2007)
- Zack Alford – drums (1989–1992, 2000–2007)
- Sara Lee – bass (1989–1992, 1998–2002)
- Julee Cruise – vocals, percussion (1992–1994; died 2022)
- Paul Gordon – keyboards, guitars (2007–2016; his death)
- Greg Suran – guitars (2013–2022)

== Discography ==
Studio albums

- The B-52's (1979)
- Wild Planet (1980)
- Whammy! (1983)
- Bouncing Off the Satellites (1986)
- Cosmic Thing (1989)
- Good Stuff (1992)
- Funplex (2008)

== See also ==
- Music of Athens, Georgia
