= Ricky Wilson (guitarist) =

American guitarist (1953–1985)

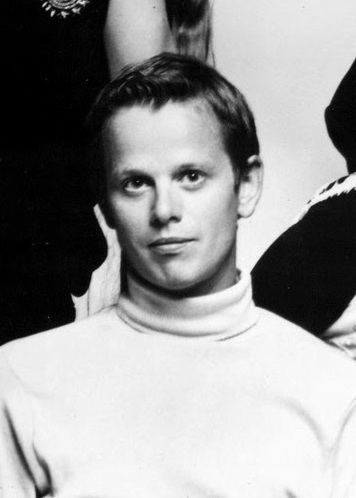
- Wilson in 1980

Background information
- Born: Ricky Helton Wilson; March 19, 1953; Athens, Georgia, U.S.
- Died: October 12, 1985 (aged 32) New York City, U.S.
- Genres: New wave; post-punk
- Occupation: Musician
- Instruments: Guitar; bass guitar; keyboards; vocals
- Years active: 1973–1985
- Formerly of: The B-52s; Black Narcissus; Loon
- Website: theb52s.com

Ricky Helton Wilson (March 19, 1953 – October 12, 1985) was an American musician best known as the original guitarist and founding member of rock band the B-52s. Born in Athens, Georgia, Wilson was the brother of fellow member Cindy Wilson. The B-52s were founded in 1976, when Ricky, Cindy, Kate Pierson, Keith Strickland and Fred Schneider shared a tropical flaming volcano drink at a Chinese restaurant and, after an impromptu music session at the home of their friend Owen Scott III, played for the first time at a Valentine's Day party for friends. Wilson's unusual guitar tunings were a large contribution to the band's quirky sound.

On October 12, 1985, at the age of 32, Wilson died from complications related to AIDS following the recording of the band's fourth studio album Bouncing Off the Satellites. According to Strickland, the album had been completed and mixed before Wilson's death, with only the cover art not yet designed (an illustration by Kenny Scharf was ultimately decided upon). Devastated, the band went into seclusion and did not tour to promote the album, though they did several photo shoots and TV appearances and filmed a video for "Girl from Ipanema Goes to Greenland".

In addition to his work with the B-52s, Wilson played the guitar on the song "Breakin' in My Heart" on Tom Verlaine's self-titled debut album in 1979. This was his only non-B-52s appearance on record. He also appeared in various films, notably One Trick Pony. Posthumously, he also appeared in Athens, GA: Inside/Out, The B-52s 1979–1989, and Time Capsule: Videos for a Future Generation through archival footage.

Rolling Stone named Wilson the 247th greatest guitarist of all time in 2023.

== Early life ==
Wilson was born on March 19, 1953, to Bobby Jack Wilson, a firefighter and a veteran of the United States Army, and Linda J. Wilson (née Mairholtz), in Athens, Georgia. He was the elder brother of Cindy Wilson. At an early age, Wilson developed an interest in music and learned how to play folk guitar from the PBS series Learning Folk Guitar. Upon entering Clarke Central High School, Wilson had upgraded to a Silvertone guitar and, to tape his music, purchased a two-track tape recorder with money earned from a summer job at the local landfill.

In mid-1969, Wilson met former Comer resident Keith Strickland at the local head shop The Looking Glass. The two shared common interests in music and Eastern mysticist culture and quickly became friends.

== Career ==
=== 1970–1976: Black Narcissus ===
During mid-1969, both Wilson and Strickland collaborated in writing and performing music, loosely calling themselves Loon, and aspired to perform live.

From 1969 to 1971, Wilson and Strickland collaborated with high school friends Pete Love of Louisville and Athens native Owen Scott III in performing together as the four-member band Black Narcissus.

Upon graduation from the University of Georgia in 1976, Wilson kept in touch with Strickland and they toured Europe, eventually returning and taking jobs at the Southeastern Stages bus station in Athens, where Strickland's father was the manager.

=== 1976–1985: The B-52s ===
In late 1976, Strickland and Wilson returned to Athens in search of further employment. The two joined the B-52s when they, Wilson's sister Cindy, Kate Pierson, and Fred Schneider of local protest band the Sun-Donuts, formed the group in an impromptu musical practice session after sharing a tropical flaming volcano drink at a Chinese restaurant. They played their first concert in 1977 at a Valentine's Day party for friends. The band's quirky take on the new wave sound of their era was a combination of dance and surf music set apart by the unusual guitar tunings used by Wilson.

Wilson cited various children's records, the Mamas & the Papas, and Esquerita and the Voola as sources of inspiration in his musical career. Wilson also played the guitar on the song "Breakin' In My Heart" on Tom Verlaine's self-titled debut album.

== Illness and death ==
In 1982, during recording sessions for the band's third studio album Whammy!, Wilson discovered he had contracted HIV. He confided his illness to Keith Strickland. In 1985, during recording for their album Bouncing Off the Satellites, Wilson's illness became more severe; both Strickland and Pierson have stated that despite this, he kept his illness secret from the other members of the band. In an interview, Pierson stated that Wilson did so because he "did not want anyone to worry about him or fuss about him".

On October 12, 1985, in the Memorial Sloan–Kettering Cancer Center, Wilson died of AIDS, at the age of 32. He was buried in Oconee Hill Cemetery in Athens. His cause of death was initially reported to have been cancer. The band did little promotional work and did not tour to promote the album. Upon reforming in 1988, the band continued as a four-piece, with Strickland replicating Wilson's riffs from their earlier material in live performances.
