= Keith Strickland =

American musician (b. 1953)

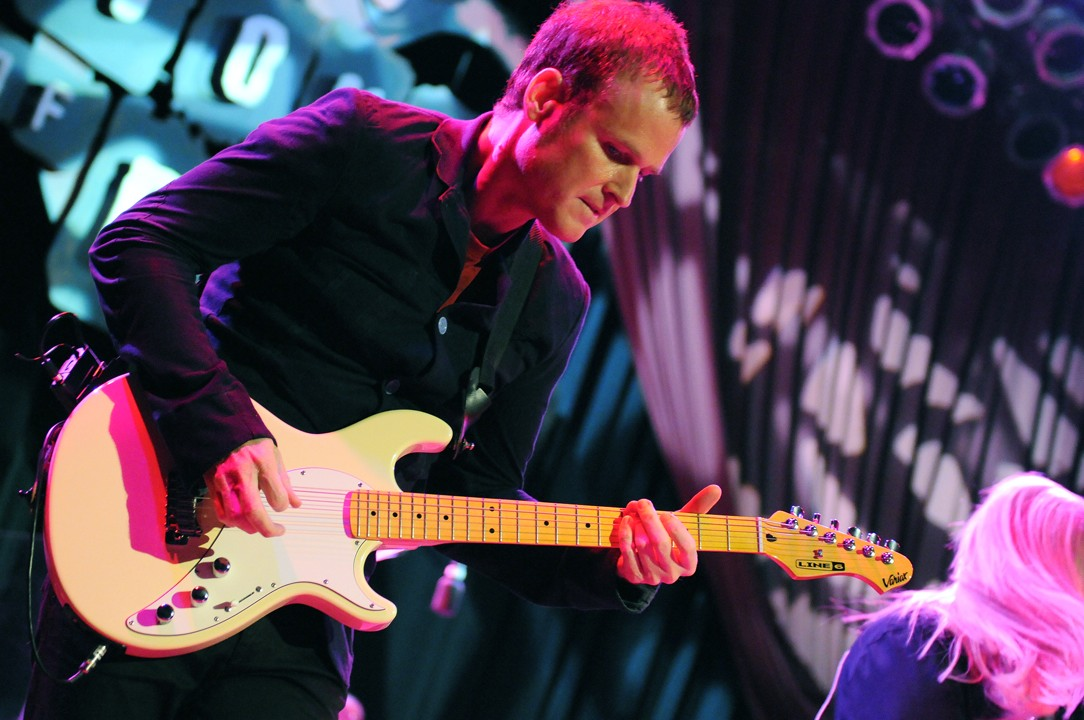
- Strickland performing with the B-52s in 2008

Background information
- Born: Julian Keith Strickland; October 26, 1953 (age 72); Athens, Georgia, U.S.
- Genres: New wave; rock and roll; alternative rock; punk rock; pop rock
- Occupations: Singer-songwriter; composer; musician; multi-instrumentalist
- Instruments: Vocals; guitar; keyboards; bass guitar; drums; percussion
- Years active: 1976–present
- Member of: The B-52s

Julian Keith Strickland (born October 26, 1953) is an American singer-songwriter, composer, musician, multi-instrumentalist, and one of the founding members of the B-52s. He was born in Athens, Georgia.

Originally the band's drummer, Strickland switched to guitar after the death of guitarist Ricky Wilson in 1985. Strickland also plays keyboards and bass guitar on many of the B-52s recordings, and has occasionally provided backing vocals. Strickland composes the music for the B-52s. He said of the process: "Ricky and I used to write the music together, but now I write the individual instrument parts and arrange the instrumental compositions myself. I'm trying to convey a feeling when I compose. I think of my instrumentals as soundscapes – the chord progressions, rhythms, harmonics and musical direction are used to evoke various sonic atmospheres or moods."

In 1992, Strickland came out publicly as gay, and in 1996 he married Mark Hayda.

On December 13, 2012, Strickland retired from touring with the B-52s; Fred Schneider said of Strickland's announcement, "We had known about Keith’s decision for a while but we just didn’t want to think about it. Keith will probably still be available for special shows but he wanted to get off the road. Keith will always be able to work with us whenever he wants. He's a best friend." Greg Suran is his current live stand-in.

Strickland continues composing instrumental electronic music.

== Filmography ==
- One Trick Pony (1980)
- Athens, GA: Inside Out (1987)
- The Flintstones (1994)
- A Life in the Death of Joe Meek (2000)
