= Music of Athens, Georgia =

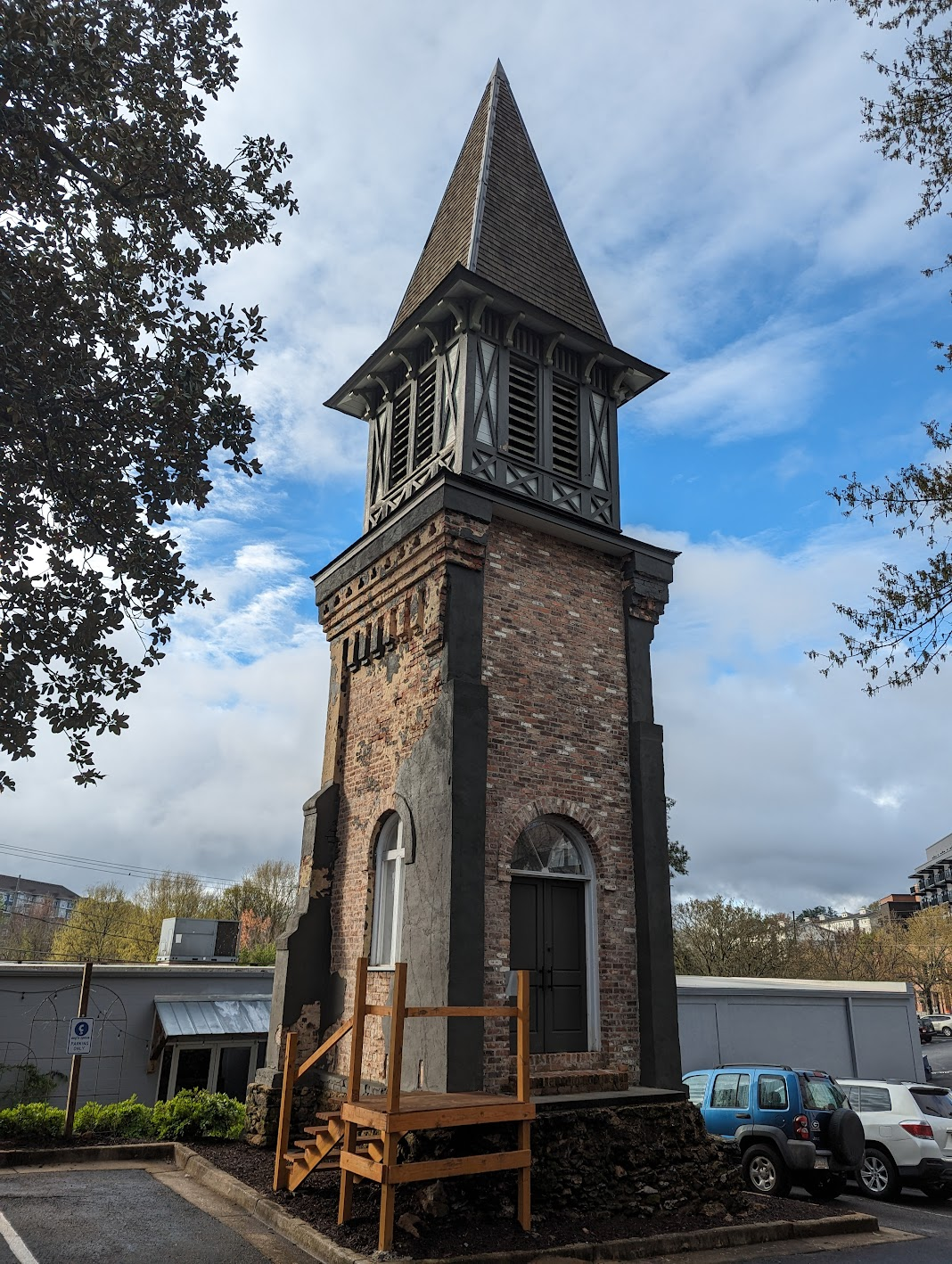
The steeple of St. Mary's Episcopal Church on Oconee Street in Athens. This is all that remains of where members of R.E.M. lived briefly and performed their first concert on April 5, 1980

The music of Athens, Georgia, includes a wide variety of popular music and was an important part of the early evolution of alternative rock and new wave. The city is well known as the home of bands such as R.E.M., Widespread Panic, The B-52's and several long-time indie rock groups. The city is the home of the Athens Symphony Orchestra and WUOG, the radio station of the University of Georgia (UGA). Much of the modern Athens music scene relies on students from UGA. UGA sponsors Western classical performances and groups specializing in other styles.

Athens became a center for music in the region during the Civil War, and gained further fame in the early twentieth century with the founding of the Morton Theatre, which was a major touring destination for African American performers. The city's local rock-music scene can be traced to the 1950s, with live music at Allen's, a hamburger restaurant in Normaltown. International attention came in the 1970s, when The B-52's began releasing the first of several best-selling recordings. Athens-based rock bands have performed in a wide array of styles, and the city has never had a characteristic style of rock; most of the bands have been united only in their quirky and iconoclastic image.

Music author Richie Unterberger describes the town as an unlikely center for musical development, as a "sleepy [place where] it's difficult to imagine anyone working up a sweat, let alone playing rock music." The contributions of Athens to rock, country music and bluegrass have earned it the nickname "the Liverpool of the South", and the city is known as one of the American birthplaces for both modern alternative rock and new-wave music. Athens was home to the first and most famous college music scene in the country, beginning in the 1970s.

== Music venues and institutions ==
Athens's local music is based primarily in the small downtown area of the northern part of the city.

=== College Avenue ===
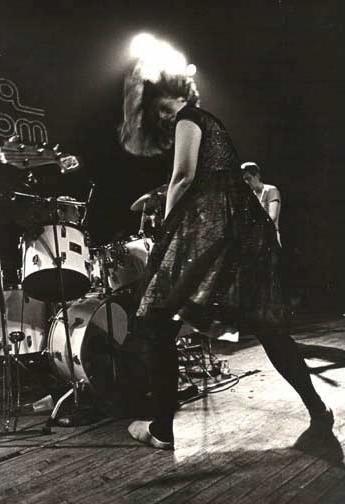
Pylon's Vanessa Briscoe Hay onstage in 1981

The 40 Watt Club is among the most famous indie rock venues on the East Coast; the club unofficially opened at 171 College Avenue on Halloween 1978 with a band called Strictly American, featuring Curtis Crowe, the club's founder and future drummer for the band Pylon.

A second location of Downtown Records opened at 114 College Avenue, a former bank building dating to the 1920s, in the late 1980s. It was there in 1995 that local musician Monte Koster opened Lunch Paper, a bar and music venue, before moving to Washington Street in 2004.

At 128 College Avenue stood Ruthless Records during the making of Athens, GA: Inside/Out. It became the original location of Downtown Records and, later, Big Shot Records. Big Shot later moved to 264 East Clayton Street before closing.

170 College Avenue was the home of R.E.M.'s offices between 1995 and 2011, having moved from West Clayton Street (where their rehearsal studio remained).

=== Oconee Street ===
Stitchcraft, a former sewing factory, was located at 393 Oconee Street. It hosted performances by The Replacements, Pylon and R.E.M. It became the i&i Club in 1982, then the short-lived Buckhead Beach. Lunch Paper began at the location in 1984, owned by Chris DeBarr and Paul Thomas. Also on Oconee Street, at number 286, the B&L Warehouse hosted rock bands throughout the 1970s.

=== Hancock Avenue ===
The Rockfish Palace nightclub opened in 1987 at 433 East Hancock Avenue, owned by Brian Cook and later taken over by J. R. Green. It became several other ventures, including Boneshakers, which closed in 2005.

On West Hancock Avenue, Joey Tatum opened the Manhattan Cafe, a bar popular with musicians, in 2004. A reformed Pylon played there that August. It later moved to 337 North Hull Street and was still in business as of 2024.

=== Broad Street ===
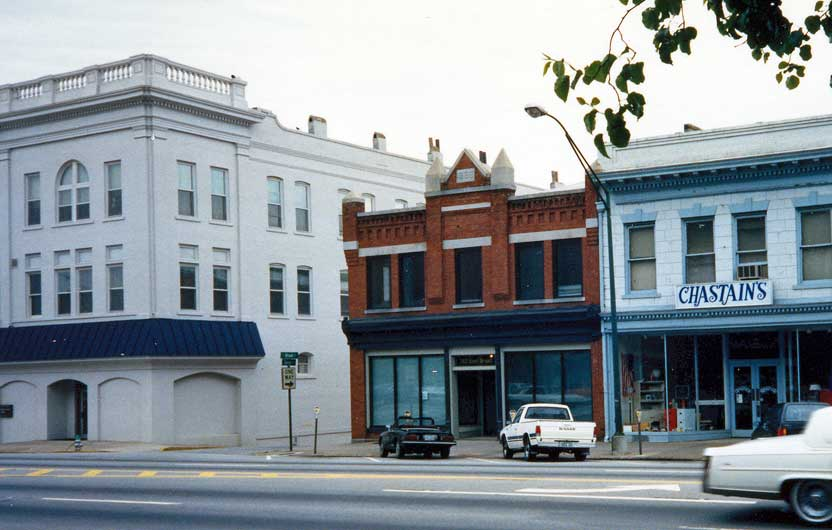
The 40 Watt Club at its fourth location, on Broad Street

The three-storey Frigidaire Building, at 312 East Broad Street, was originally the Athens Opera House in the 1880s. After being the home of Athens Refrigeration for 54 years, it became Tasty World in 1997. The Whigs and Modern Skirts got their start there.

At 229 East Broad Street was the Foreign Legion record store. Its upstairs storage room was used a performance space. The Cramps played there in 1979. The venue later became Chapter 3 Records, owned by Chris Rasmussen. Pylon made its debut above the store on March 9, 1979. It was in the store, while a party (possibly a fraternity party featuring Pylon) was in progress above him, that R.E.M. bassist Mike Mills wrote the guitar line for the band's debut single, 1981's "Radio Free Europe", on an unplugged electric guitar. The chorus and bridge were later added by guitarist Peter Buck.

Tyrone's Old Chameleon stood at the corner of East Broad Street and Foundry Street between 1978 and 1982, when it burned down.

=== Clayton Street ===
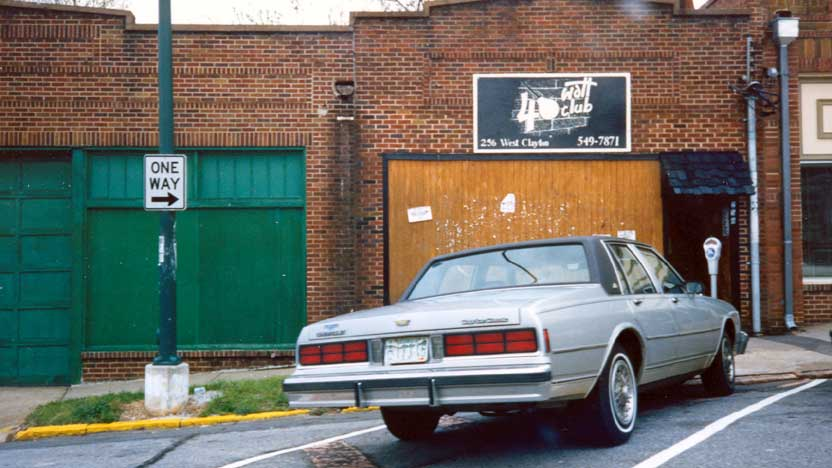
The third and fifth location of the 40 Watt Club was on West Clayton Street

Wuxtry Records, founded by Dan Wall, opened its doors at 197 East Clayton Street in 1975. Peter Buck worked there in its early days.

The Downstairs, a cafe and live music venue, opened at 140 East Clayton Street in 1988. It became DT's Down Under in 1995.

At 184 West Clayton Street, The Last Resort music club was in existence between 1966 and the late 1980s. The Last Resort Grill opened there in 1992.

Prior to becoming the third iteration of the 40 Watt Club, 256 West Clayton Street was the home of the Koffee Klub 11:11. It was closed down during an R.E.M. show in 1980 for not having a proper license.

The Georgia Bar was in business at 159 West Clayton Street between 1986 and 2018. Beck played a show-after-a-show there in 2006. It formed a "Barmuda Triangle" of bars at the corner of Lumpkin Street with The Globe and The Roadhouse, which opened in the early 1990s.

=== Washington Street ===
The Uptown Lounge at 140 East Washington Street hosted live music nightly at this location from 1984 through early 1990

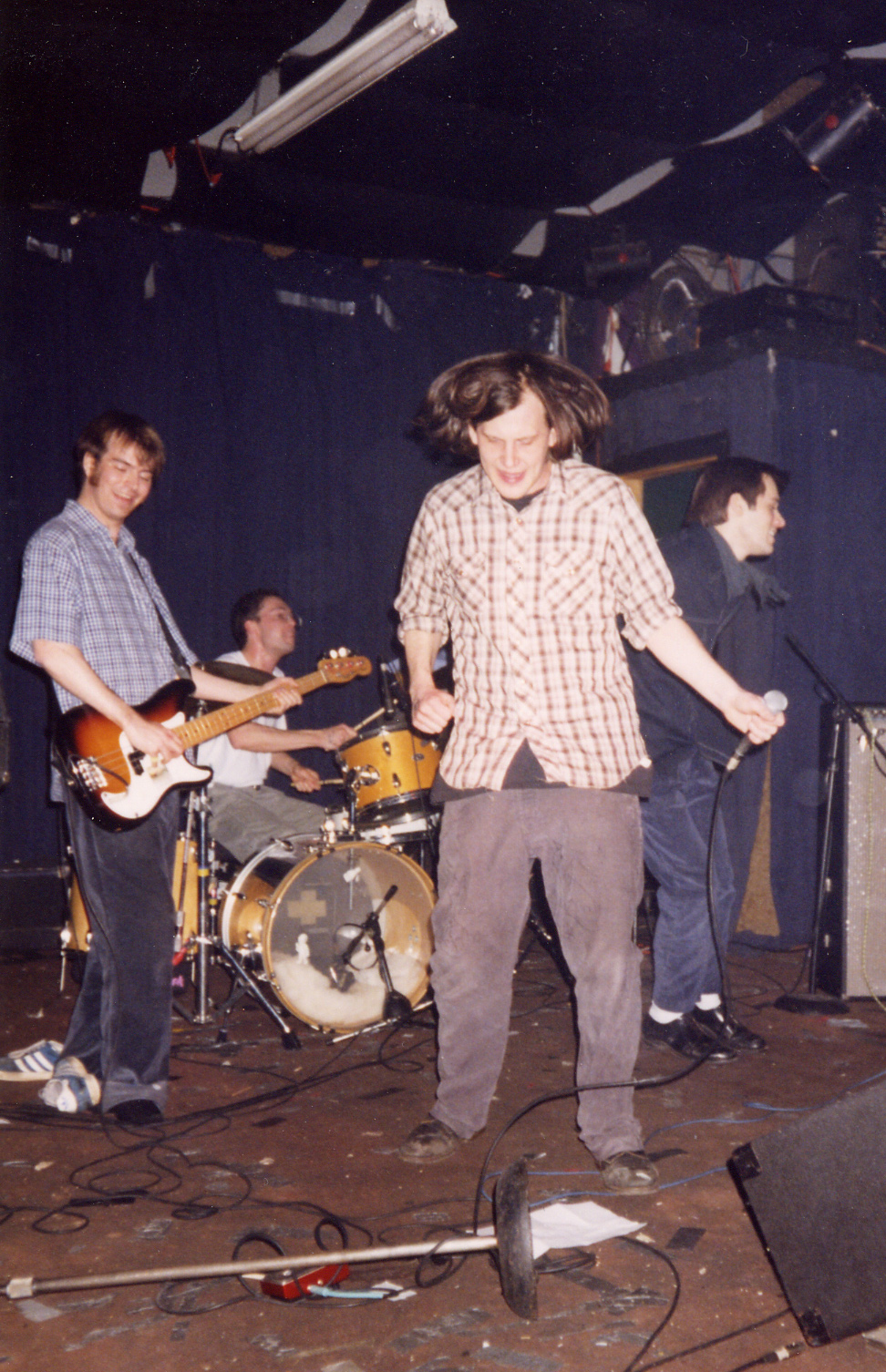
Elf Power with Jeff Mangum and Kevin Barnes at the Atomic Music Hall

The Uptown Lounge opened in 1984. Located at 140 East Washington Street, it later became The Chameleon Club (or "Ham Leon", after two letters fell off its sign), The Shoe Box and Atomic Music Hall (from 1990 to 1997).

The Engine Room music venue operated out of 243 West Washington Street during the early years of the 21st century.

=== Hoyt Street ===
TK Hardy's Saloon occupied 137 Hoyt Street, in an old train depot complex, between 1971 and 1975, when it became Locomotion, a short-lived coffee house. The original Grit restaurant was located there until the building burned down in 1996. The Grit moved to 199 Prince Avenue, formerly the home of the Coffee Club, which musicians and artists frequented in the 1970s and 1980s.

=== Lumpkin Street ===
199 North Lumpkin Street, where The Globe operated from 1990, became Athens Yacht Club, which hosted blues and cover bands in the late 1980s.

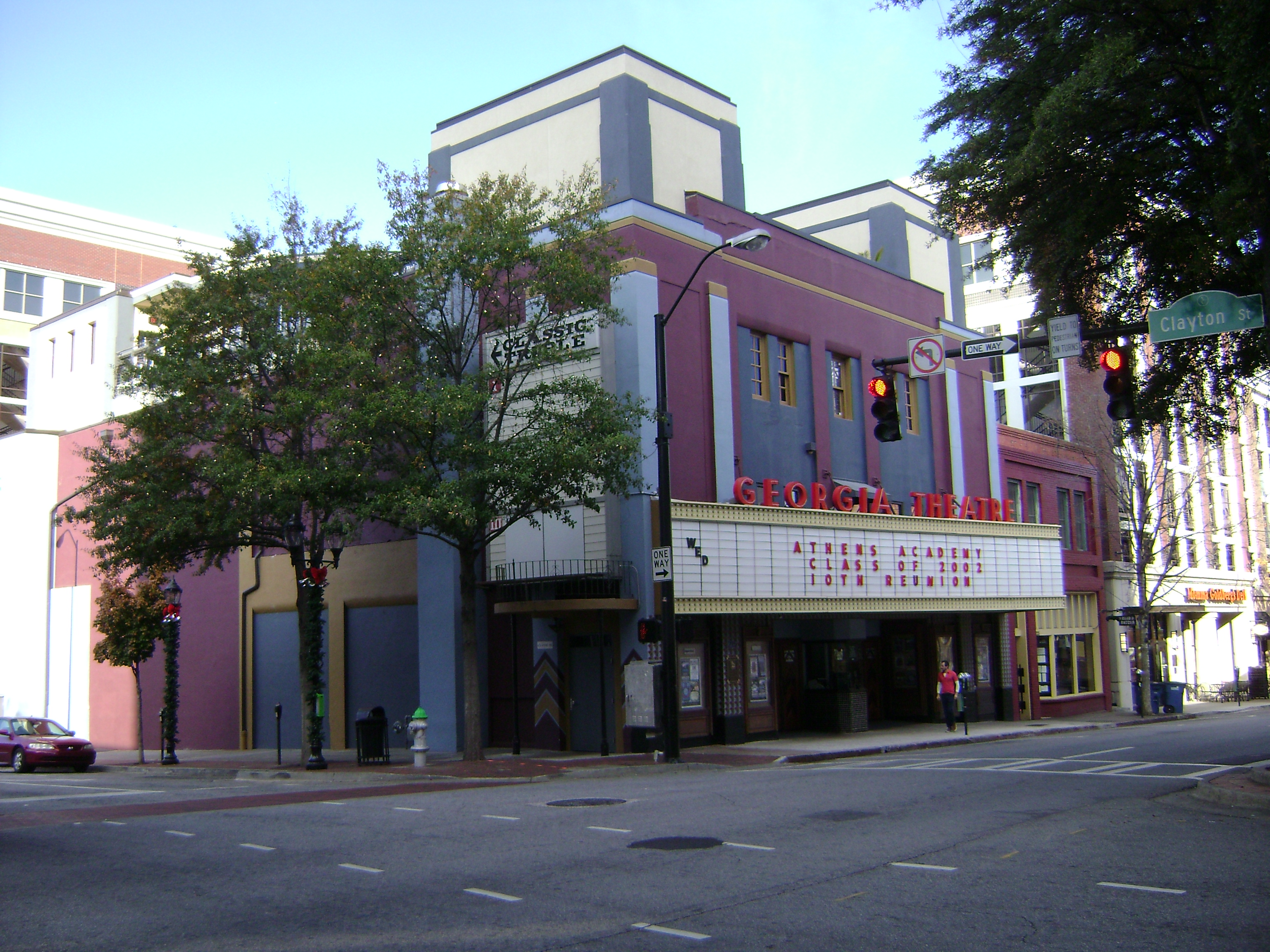
Georgia Theatre (2012)

Other major music venues in the city include the Georgia Theatre, a converted cinema at 215 North Lumpkin Street which hosted both local and touring performers. The theater burned down in 2009, but was remodeled and reopened two years later. Other venues include the Caledonia Lounge, the historic Foundry Music Venue (which was originally built in 1850 as an iron foundry), and the UGA Performing Arts Center, home to the Ramsey Concert Hall and the Hugh Hodgson Concert Hall. Monroe Morton's Morton Theatre, at 195 West Washington Street, became a major part of the city's African American community in the early twentieth century; it claims to be the only theater from that era remaining in operation.

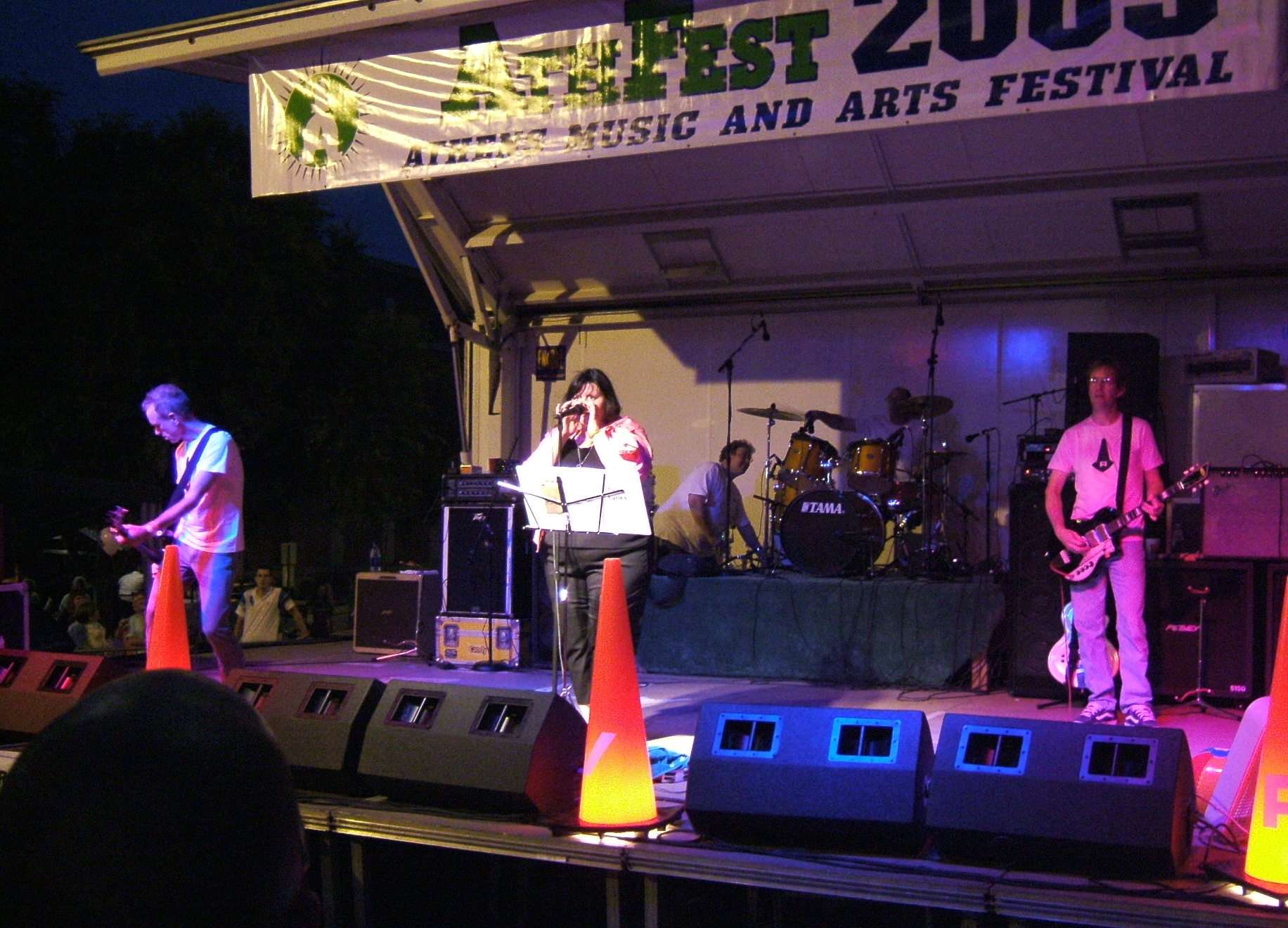
Pylon performing at AthFest in 2005

Athens is home to the summer music festival Athfest, Athens Popfest and the late-spring Athens Human Rights Festival and North Georgia Folk Festival. The college radio station WUOG (90.5 FM), the low-power (100.7) FM WPPP-LP and the free weekly Flagpole are the city's most prominent modern music media. Athens has never produced a major local label like many similar indie-rock towns; the most important label of the 1970s and 1980s was DB Records, based out of Atlanta, though jangle-pop pioneers Kindercore Records were also Athens-based. Athens is home to long-running indie label Happy Happy Birthday To Me Records, which has been operating consistently since 1999.

Local music institutions include the Athens Symphony Orchestra, Athens Choral Society (founded in 1971), Athens Youth Symphony and the Athens Folk Music and Dance Society. The Athens Symphony Orchestra was founded in 1978 as a firmly non-profit, strictly volunteer organization, conducted by Albert Ligotti of the University of Georgia. The first performance came in 1979; the orchestra now has two regular performances, one in the summer and one in the winter, and has also done shows for young people, pops concerts and Christmas concerts. In 1996, the Athens Symphony moved into its modern home, the Classic Center Theatre at 300 North Thomas Street in downtown Athens. This location was Sparky's, a seafood restaurant which hosted local bands and musicians, in the early 1980s. In the building's loading bay, on Hancock Avenue, was the Mad Hatter. R.E.M., the Blasters and Jerry Lee Lewis played there.

UGA's campus has long been an important part of local music. Country Music Hall of Fame songwriter and performer "Whispering" Bill Anderson attended the college and used to play guitar around campus. The faculty of the Hugh Hodgson School of Music operate the Georgia Brass Quintet and Georgia Woodwind Quintet. Student institutions include the ARCO Chamber Orchestra, Men's and Women's Glee Clubs, several concert choirs, jazz bands and brass and woodwind ensembles, the Redcoat Marching Band, the University Philharmonia and a Symphony Orchestra. UGA also has multiple a cappella groups, including With Someone Else's Money, Noteworthy and the Accidentals, who are regionally known. The Georgia Bulldogs baseball team, who play at Foley Field, feature organist Matthew Kaminski.

=== Barber Street ===
In the summer of 1980, Love Tractor made their debut on Barber Street. The band was composed of Michael Richmond (guitar), Armistead Wellford (multi-instrumentalist), Mark Cline (guitar) and Kit Swartz (drums).

It was July 9, 1980, and Love Tractor played their six songs over and over again while the party went on and spread through the house, out the back porch to the packed-dirt parking lot and the thick hedges, old oaks and bamboo. The party had kegs of beer and everyone was there. When the kegs were emptied, Sam Seawright, who had roadied with Cline for The Tone Tones, brought out a tub of green homemade beer and the party kept on. Before the night was out, Method Actors drummer David Gamble wrestled Pylon singer Vanessa Briscoe to the ground. To apologize, he drank some of Sam’s homemade beer out of Vanessa’s sweaty, gritty jelly shoe. When that didn’t quench his thirst, he lifted the trash tub and drained the dregs.

— Rodger Lyle Brown, Party Out of Bounds: The B-52's, R.E.M., and the Kids Who Rocked Athens, Georgia (1991)

Many bands lived on Barber Street, which runs north from Prince Avenue to northwest of downtown. "Mike Mills and Bill Berry lived next door to me," said Cline. "I lived with Michael [Lachowski] and Curtis [Crowe] from Pylon and Kit [Swartz] from the Side Effects, who also was in Love Tractor. It was at the house they called Pylon Park. Peter [Buck] lived four houses down. Michael Stipe lived next door to that house. On the eastern side of Barber Street, when they repaved the sidewalks, Linda Hopper, Maureen McLaughlin and Leslie Michel—these women helped support the scene—went out and wrote all the bands' names in the [cement], and they're still there. I’ve told the city they need to lift that up and preserve it."

While Pylon was playing their first show, across town R.E.M. played a benefit for Bertis Downs's lawyer friend John Kupris at the 40 Watt East at 100 College Avenue.

Michael Lachowski had a phone number called the Party Line. Locals would call Lachowski and tell him where the party was that night, and Lachowski would relay the information to the Party Line.

== History ==
The earliest music in North Georgia, including what is now Athens, was that of the Native Americans of the area, principally the Creek and the Cherokee. Athens was officially chartered in 1806, and began growing rapidly near the middle of the nineteenth century.

By the time of the American Civil War in the 1860s, the city was an important part of musical life in Georgia. The war accelerated the development of the city's musical importance, as Athens was largely spared widespread destruction while the larger city of Atlanta took a long time to recover. Major touring acts like the Dixie Family and The Slomans visited Athens during the war; the Dixie Family, a prominent touring group, performed disastrously, according to local newspapers, who said that the highlight of the performance came from four local African American musicians, and the Dixie Family had absconded with the concert's proceeds, which had been promised to the local Ladies Aid Society.

In the 1870s, the city was almost half African American, and local black-owned industry flourished; among the residents was Bob Cole, born in 1868 to a musically active family. Cole later became a pioneer in African American theater, known for works like the 1898 musical A Trip to Coontown and the song "La Hoola Boola".

African American industry, churches and other institutions grew rapidly in prominence through the end of the nineteenth century. The city's African American community was well established by the beginning of the twentieth century, when the corner of Lumpkin and Washington Streets became a major center for the city's black culture. This area was known as Hot Corner, and was owned by a number of black professional businesses, as well as many performance spaces and a renowned opera house in the Morton Building which hosted such national figures as Louis Armstrong and Duke Ellington. The Morton Theater was one of the preeminent venues in the city in the early twentieth century, and is the only such theater to survive to the present, though it was not in operation for many years, until re-opening in 1993.

=== Origins of the modern scene ===
In the 1950s, the city's musical life consisted primarily of dances at local venues like the American Legion Hall and the YMCA, where popular bandleaders included most famously Jimmy Dorsey. The Canteen was a spot in Memorial Park in Athens which became an important performance space after local musician Terry "Mad Dog" Melton and his group began playing there in 1958. The Canteen later hosted local Motown/beach legends The Jesters, who have continued to perform from 1964 to the present.

Later in the 1960s and into the 1970s, locally prominent bands gradually changed from primarily cover bands to more well rounded groups, while the city's musical opportunities grew with the foundation of venues and institutions. This period has been called the Normaltown River of Music, and included long-time local performers like Mad Dog Melton as well as Brian Burke, Davis Causey and Randall Bramblett, many of whom later worked with Gregg Allman, Sea Level and the Nitty Gritty Dirt Band.

The most influential local bands to emerge from this period included the Normaltown Flyers, and Dixie Grease. Allen's Hamburgers, where the Normaltown Flyers were the house band for many years, opened in 1955 at 1294 Prince Avenue and closed there in 2004. Bars like The Last Resort (currently the Last Resort Grille restaurant) opened in the 1960s, beginning the local club scene just as some bands were beginning to gain some regional fame for Athens.

=== Rock ===
Many members of Athens's most prominent later bands became locally renowned starting in the 1970s, including The B-52's. In the late 1970s, the 40 Watt Club became a well-known regional attraction for music fans. The early 1980s saw a host of new bands and venues appear, including the Uptown Lounge, at 140 East Washington Street, in 1984, while the city's musical subculture became more diversified. LSD, a hallucinogenic drug, was widely used in the college music scene in this era. With the local industry's growth in the 1980s, the 40 Watt Club moved to a larger space, and in 1989 the landmark Georgia Theatre was reopened as a music venue.

Studio 1093, was established in the Boulevard neighborhood by recording engineer, Jim Hawkins who had designed the studio for Capricorn Records in Macon, Georgia. Studio 1093 was rented to R.E.M. and remained an Athens staple until 2018 playing host to both established musicians and those just starting out.

Ort's Oldies, a used record store on Jackson Street, and its proprietor, William Orten Carlton, commonly known as "Ort", were among the institutional figures that made the Athens music scene possible. Ort had an excellent memory for rock trivia, which served him well in running the store. Perhaps more importantly, his off-the-wall sense of humor and warmly iconoclastic personality (and his thrift-sale wardrobe) were regularly on display at parties, gigs and musical venues around town. Carlton died in 2023, aged 73.

A final element in creating and sustaining the Athens musical culture was UGA's Lamar Dodd School of Art. The great majority of Athens' musicians and their fan base were associated with the college's liberal arts curriculum, and the School of Art, rather than the music department, was the area where the creative and musical alliances that later defined the scene began forming in the 1970s. Michael Stipe of R.E.M. was an art major (although he did not graduate), and the Art School incubated other major figures such as all four of the members of Pylon were art students there including Curtis Crowe, founding member and drummer for Pylon. The cinematographer for the documentary film Athens GA: Inside/Out was James Herbert, a professor at the School of Art. Herbert went on to direct music videos for various Athens bands, including fourteen for R.E.M. Rock photographer Jason Thrasher has documented many Athens musicians in his 2017 book, Athens Potluck.

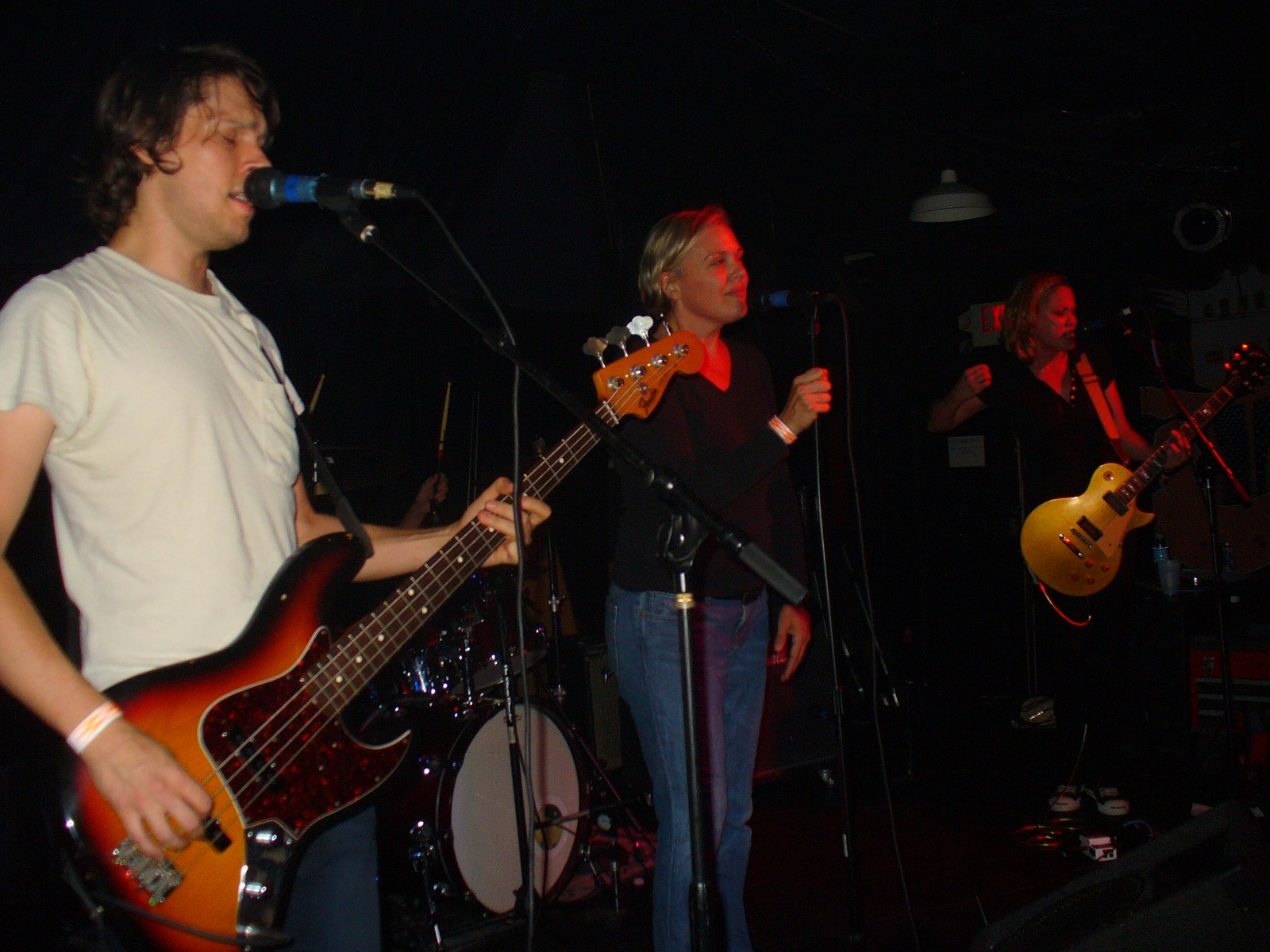
Oh-OK performing in 2007. From left to right: bassist Scott Rowe, drummer Chad Williams (obscured except for his hands), singer Linda Hopper, and guitarist and backing vocalist Ruthie Morris

The B-52's and R.E.M. became by far the most famous musical products of Athens in the 1980s, when both bands released a string of hits. The B-52's formed after a St. Valentine's Day party in 1977. The members had little musical knowledge, but performed new-wave music with a cheeky and humorous image and sound. They were known for their campy thrift-store fashion, and their unusual and eye-catching music videos for hits like "Rock Lobster" and "Love Shack". Though the B–52's were the first Athens band to achieve national prominence, their popularity was soon eclipsed by R.E.M.

The future members of R.E.M. moved to Athens to work and/or attend UGA, including bassist Mike Mills and drummer Bill Berry. The group began performing as R.E.M. in 1980. They became locally prominent, and released a single, "Radio Free Europe", which was a major college-rock hit. Their popularity grew with a series of singles, EPs and albums that made R.E.M. the top underground band in the country, finally breaking into the mainstream with 1987's "The One I Love" and "It's the End of the World as We Know It (And I Feel Fine)."

By 1991's Out of Time album, which featured vocals by Kate Pierson of The B-52's —and its acclaimed follow–up Automatic for the People (named after the motto of Weaver D's, a local Athens soul-food eatery), R.E.M. had become one of the world's biggest rock bands. The band's style went through many evolutions but originally had a jangle pop sound and harmonies often compared to folk–rock band The Byrds; singer and songwriter Michael Stipe is known for obscure, allusive lyrics delivered in a monotonous drone. The success of R.E.M. and The B-52's brought attention from major labels and music media to Athens, and many local bands received a career boost.

Pylon was founded in 1979. The band's danceable sound, a blend of new wave, post-punk, jangle pop, alternative rock and funk rock, influenced the Athens music scene and the 1980s American pop underground. AllMusic wrote that Pylon's "role as elder statesmen of the alternative rock explosion is unassailable". They released three albums, three singles and an EP during their on-and-off-again career. Much of their early material along with rarities was reissued by New West Records as part of a boxset titled Box. The boxset also includes a 200-page hardcover book with new interviews with the surviving members of the band and testimonies from members of R.E.M., The B-52's, Gang of Four, The Bongos, Mission of Burma, Sleater-Kinney, Beat Happening and Sonic Youth among others.

Other 1980s local bands with nationwide alternative followings included Love Tractor, Oh-OK, with Michael Stipe's sister Lynda Stipe, vocalist Linda Hopper (later of Magnapop) and future solo performer Matthew Sweet. The members of R.E.M. have remained fixtures in Athens as they have also become international stars, helping out local performers like Vic Chesnutt, the Chickasaw Mudd Puppies and Jack Logan.

The Elephant 6 Collective, a group of like-minded indie bands, gained limited nationwide exposure starting in the mid-1990s with the rise of Neutral Milk Hotel, Elf Power and Olivia Tremor Control. The same period saw the Kindercore Records roster find critical acclaim, including the bands Sunshine Fix, Masters of the Hemisphere, Japancakes, Love Tractor, Gresham Disco and Of Montreal. Candy, a DJ store owned by Michael Lachowski of Pylon, opened in 1998; the store became an important part of the burgeoning dance music scene that produced Danger Mouse, Phungus and DJ 43. Lachowski also co-managed the record store Wax Jr. Facts at 260 North Jackson Street between 1982 and 1984. It was a "junior store" for Wax 'n' Facts in Atlanta. 142 North Jackson Street was a popular practice space for bands through the 1980s and into the 1990s.

=== Other styles ===
Athens is near the Blue Ridge Mountains area of North Georgia, an important region in the development of several varieties of folk music, including the Appalachian bluegrass style and the Piedmont blues. North Georgia's bluegrass heritage can be traced back to the nineteenth century, when bluegrass was a nascent style throughout Appalachia and North Georgia was home to major fiddling contests, beginning in the 1880s. A 1983 recording expedition by Art and Margo Rosenbaum documented the continued existence of many forms of folk music, including work songs, string bands, African American hymns and spirituals, banjo tunes and unaccompanied ballads; the collection includes a chapter devoted to Doc and Lucy Barnes of Athens. Athens's modern contributions to the field of bluegrass include the Packway Handle Band and BlueBilly Grit.

Athens's local country scene has never been as significant as the profusion of indie rock bands; however, modern Athens rock takes many elements from the folk, bluegrass and country traditions, including such bands as the Normaltown Flyers. The band Drive-By Truckers, Power Play and the Holman Autry Band, have done much in recent years to make country rock a major part of Athens's musical identity. Later bands, such as The Broken String Band, have emerged influenced by the folk-rock genre. The rapper Bubba Sparxxx, originally from South Georgia, has also helped diversify Athens's country heritage by adding a rural image and elements of country music to his Dirty South style of hip hop music.

Folk artists and singer-songwriters have always flourished in the Athens atmosphere, albeit, as mentioned, not as significantly as pop and rock. Some of Athens's most notable solo singer-songwriter performers are Vic Chesnutt, Corey Smith, T. Graham Brown, John Berry, Patterson Hood, along with younger, emerging musicians like Thayer Sarrano and T. Hardy Morris. Athens also has an Irish band community, including several Irish folk bands, such as The Green Flag Band.

Athens also was the launching point for some nationally recognized contemporary Christian music artists, including Mark Heard, who started playing while a student at UGA, and the Vigilantes of Love.

A Latin music scene has emerged since 2019 with a diverse array of different musical styles that include bossa nova, samba, salsa music and tango. According to Flagpole Magazine, Latin music was once relegated to the fringes of Athens music, but has become a much larger part of the music scene. Latin events hosted in Athens include the LatinxFest, Argentina Food, Wine and Culture Festival, Milonga Tropical, and regular Latin Night events presented by Athens Latin, hosted by rotating venues. Notable performers include Beto Cacao, Grogus, Incatepec, Laura Camacho, Athens Tango Project, Quiabo De Chapeu, and Bichos Vivos.

Musicians have also presented Latin music through stage play performances such as Lupita's Revenge, a silhouette puppet show in conjunction with a five-person band that plays a variety of Latin American musical styles in a multicultural theme. Local Athens musicians have been supportive of Latin music and there have been collaborative efforts between prominent Athens musicians and Latin music artists. Art Rosenbaum helped to produce Beto Cacao's album, Undocorridos. There have also been collaborative efforts between Will Cullen Hart, from The Elephant 6 Recording Company, Pylon's Vanessa Briscoe Hay and Athens Tango Project.

=== Post-2000 ===
Athens has been home to several notable acts, including Kishi Bashi, Dead Confederate, Futurebirds, Reptar, The Whigs, New Madrid, of Montreal, Perpetual Groove, Phosphorescent and Lera Lynn. In 2017, Kindercore Records revamped as Kindercore Vinyl, which is one of the few vinyl pressing plants in the United States. Kindercore has pressed for artists such as Sufjan Stevens, Cindy Wilson and Willie Nelson.

There have been a few documentaries released about this era. The 2018 documentary Athens Rising: The Sicyon Project: Volume One, presents stories about the arts in Athens and features several acts from this era, including Athens Tango Project, Dimmen, Potted Plant, Half Acid, Linqua Franqa, Scooterbabe, Cinemechanica, Waitress, Blue Bodies, A. Mack, Joe Shadowy Peeples, The YOD, Follow Forever, KXNG BLANCO, Caulfield, WesdaRuler, Murk Daddy Flex, Jay Gonzalez (Drive-By Truckers) and Calico Vision.

The 2020 documentary Athens, Georgia: Over/Under is an inside look at the DIY scene of the town, featuring concerts and footage from 2010 to 2019. It was originally started as a project for WUOG. It is a semi-update of the 1987 film Athens, GA: Inside/Out and features interviews and performances by Reptar, New Madrid, Nana Grizol, John Fernandes, of Elephant 6 Collective, David Barbe, Gordon Lamb of Flagpole Magazine, Nate Mitchell of Wuxtry Records and many more. It serves as a counterpoint to the idealism of Athens, GA: Inside/Out and shows the progress of the town from the viewpoint of director Thomas Bauer and The Rodney Kings, showing the rise of bands like Reptar and New Madrid in the 2010 scene, to later disintegration of bands, and ends with the closing of Go Bar on New Year's 2019. Andrew N. Shearer, of Gonzoriffic, cited it as a great follow up to the film in his podcast, and Flagpole similarly noted it as being of significance, saying "It provides a pretty realistic impression of a particular time and place, without attempting to glamorize or mythologize itself." In August 2020, it was included in Athens-Clarke County Library's archive of works of importance.

== Video game ==
Athens was the home of Robert Prince, a long time Athens musician, when he wrote the music and created the sound effects for early computer and video games, including the Commander Keen series, Wolfenstein 3D and Doom. Athens is also the home of the rock band Bit Brigade, who play shows in which they recreate the soundtracks to the video games Castlevania, Contra, Mega Man 2, Metroid, Ninja Gaiden and The Legend of Zelda, while a speedrun of the featured game is played live.

== See also ==
- Howard Finster
