= Athens, Georgia: Over/Under =

2020 film by Thomas Bauer

Athens, GA: Over/Under
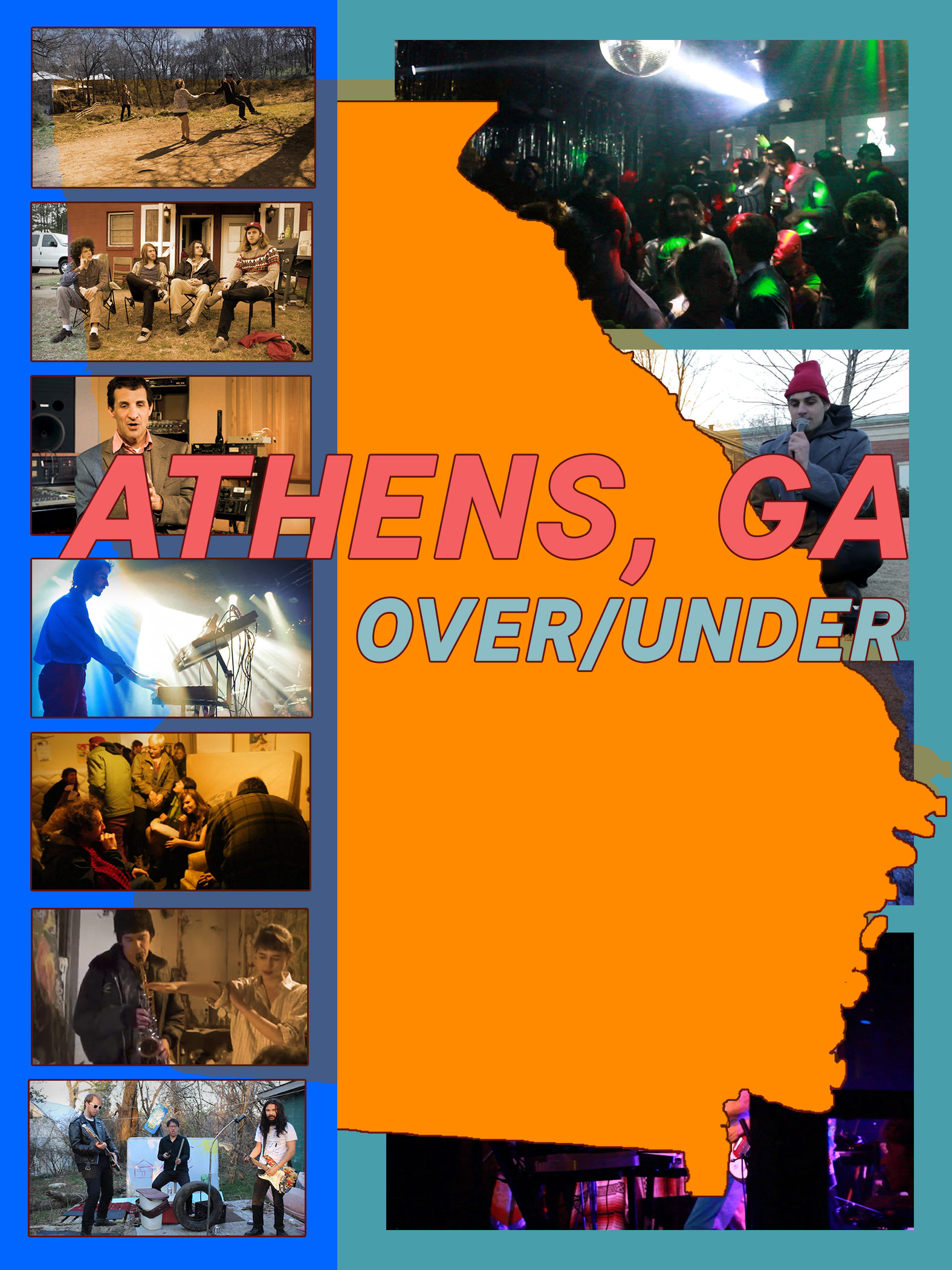
- Poster for Athens, GA: Over/Under
- Directed by: Thomas Bauer
- Cinematography: Thomas Bauer, Ella Grace Downs, Kelsey Lowrey
- Edited by: Thomas Bauer
- Music by: Rebecca Jones, Pretty Bird, The Dream Scene, Velocirapture, Jofidelity
- Distributed by: Tubi
- Release date: July 2020
- Running time: 1 hour, 36 minutes
- Country: United States
- Language: English
- Budget: $500

Athens, GA: Over/Under is a 2020 film about the DIY scene of the town of Athens, Georgia in the United States, and a portrait of several bands in the town. It also describes how the town itself changed from a small college town into a larger city bought out by multiple vendors and chain stores as rents rose and attitudes changed, and features concerts and footage from 2010 to 2019. It was originally started as a project for WUOG It is a semi-update of the 1980s film Athens, GA: Inside/Out and features interviews and performances by Reptar, New Madrid, Nana Grizol, John Fernandes of Elephant 6 Collective, David Barbe, Gordon Lamb of Flagpole Magazine, Nate Mitchell of Wuxtry Records, Muuy Biien and many more. It serves as a counterpoint to the idealism of Athens, GA: Inside/Out and shows the progress of the town from the view point of director Thomas Bauer and The Rodney Kings, showing the rise of bands like Reptar and New Madrid in the 2010 scene to later disintegration of bands, and ends with the closing of Go Bar on New Year's 2019. Andrew N. Shearer of Gonzoriffic cited it as a great follow up to the film in his podcast, and Flagpole similarly noted it as being of significance saying " It provides a pretty realistic impression of a particular time and place, without attempting to glamorize or mythologize itself.". In August 2020 it was included in Athens-Clarke County Library's archive of works of importance. In early 2024, the film was released on several streaming services, including Tubi.

== Plot ==
Athens, GA: Over/Under is broken into 4 parts, labeled "Little Steps", "Taking Forever", "Going Home" and "The Big Picture", each 20–25 minutes and displaying a different period of time between 2010 and 2019. The first part takes place between 2010 and 2013 and includes interviews with multiple bands who are just starting up, including Muuy Biien, Bubbly Mommy Gun, Werewolves, kids, Timmy and the Tumblers, and The Rodney Kings as well as more prominent bands like Reptar, who had just recorded their debut EP Oblangle Fizz, Y'all with Ben Allen and New Madrid right before they recorded their debut LP Sunswimmer with David Barbe at Chase Park Transduction. It mostly focuses on DIY bands and discusses the process of recording, moving to town, and the struggles to pay rent. David Barbe gives insight into what it was like for him to move to Athens in the 1980s and how the town has changed. A lot of the film focuses on The Rodney Kings, a punk band from the time on the verge of breaking out. It ends with a performance by John Fernandes in his house. The second part catches up with these same bands 2 years later between 2014 and 2015. It focuses on the troubles of recording and staying together through touring years and facing criticism from publications and critics. The film ends with a series of time-lapse shots of kids, Muuy Biien, Sad Dads and The Rodney Kings playing their first shows, shows during their prime, and their final shows and then a performance by Ricky and his Digits in Addieville in 2010.

The third part starts in 2018 as director Thomas Bauer discusses what has happened between parts 2 and 3, and what caused the delay in production. He is in New York at film school at The New School, and packing up his belongings including a series of mementos from his time in Athens, GA as he moves out of town and travels to Athens to premiere the first two parts of the documentary at the Classic City Fringe Festival. The film catches up with members of the Rodney Kings, Reptar, and kids as they have moved on from their time as musicians to start careers in different cities. This section ends with footage of Reptar playing their 10-year anniversary show as Thomas attempts to premiere his film, which fails as the projector goes out. This part ends with a performance by Salsa Chest in 2013 at Thomas's house. Part 4 takes place on New Year's Eve of 2019. It focuses on all the businesses that have closed since the film started, and how the town has changed. The majority of it takes place at Go Bar on its closing night, and features short interviews with almost all people featured in the film and what they will miss most about the town and Go Bar. It ends at the stroke of midnight, followed by a performance by New Madrid from 2014 at their barn.

== See also ==
- Music of Athens, Georgia
