= FLUKE Mini-Comics & Zine Festival =

Comic festival in Athens, Georgia

FLUKE
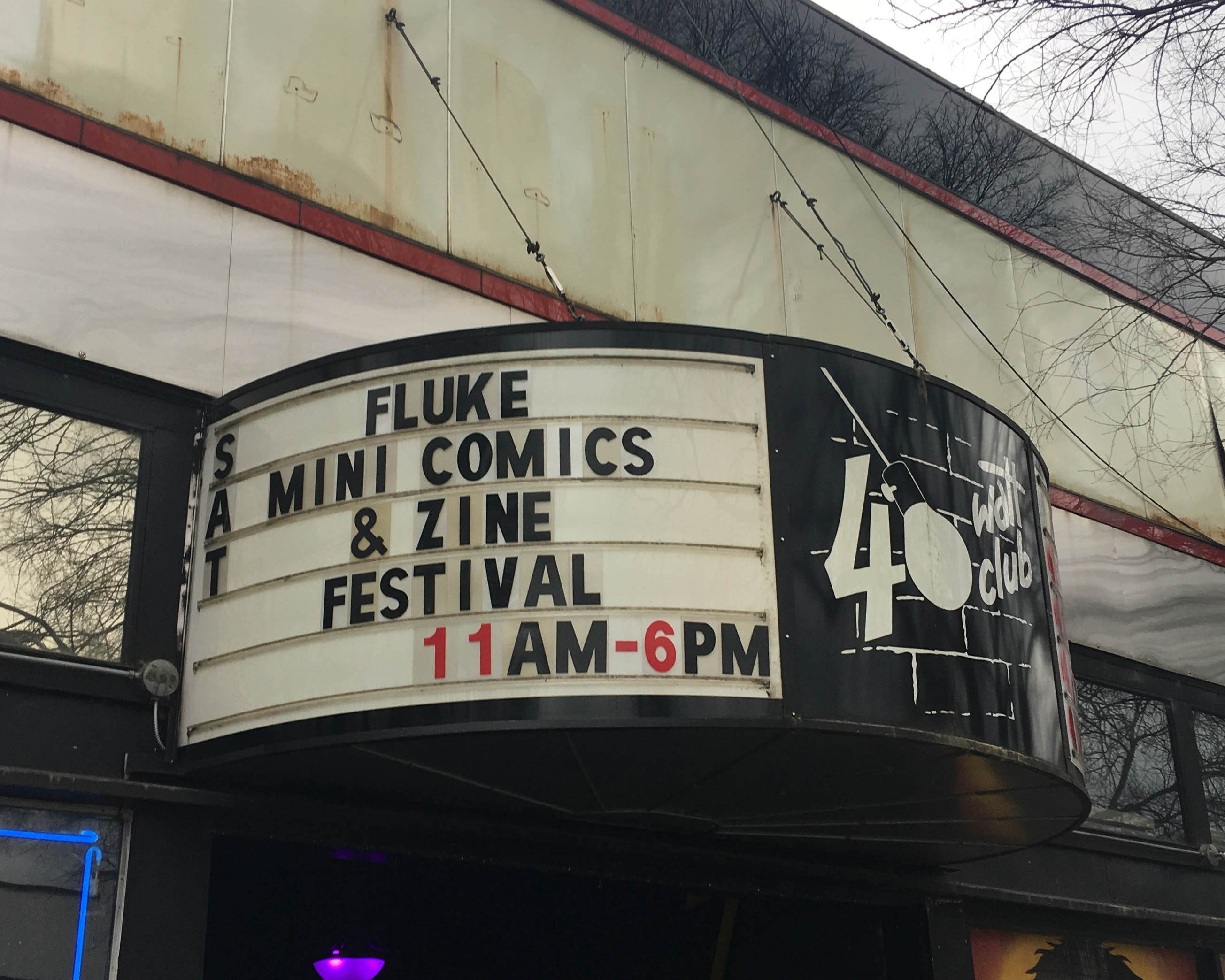
- The marquee outside the 40 Watt Club for the festival's 2018 installment
- Status: Active
- Genre: Alternative comics
- Venue: 40 Watt Club
- Locations: Athens, Georgia
- Country: United States
- Inaugurated: 2002
- Founders: T. Edward Bak
- Organizer: Robert Newsome; Patrick Dean
- Website: flukeisawesome.blogspot.com

FLUKE Mini-Comics & Zine Festival is an annual comic festival in Athens, Georgia, United States, focusing on alternative comics, minicomics, zines, underground comics, and graphic arts. Initially held in January, the event has been set in March or April since 2006. FLUKE aims to maintain a smaller environment than other, larger comic conventions. Initially held at the now-defunct bar Tasty World, the festival has taken place at Athens' 40 Watt Club since 2011. The 2026 FLUKE will be held at Live Wire, also located in downtown Athens. It has been considered a premier destination for alternative comics in the Southeastern United States.

== History ==
Fluke was established in January 2002 by cartoonist T. Edward Bak. He founded the festival after the previous year's Small Press Expo was cancelled in the wake of the September 11 attacks. The name of the festival comes from the fact that its genesis was by chance, or a fluke, and is not related to the long-running fanzine of the same name. For its second year, Bak asked for help organizing the event from cartoonist Patrick Dean and 'zine publisher Robert Newsome, who ended up absorbing the festival from him and serving as its organizers in the years since. The mission statement for the festival states:

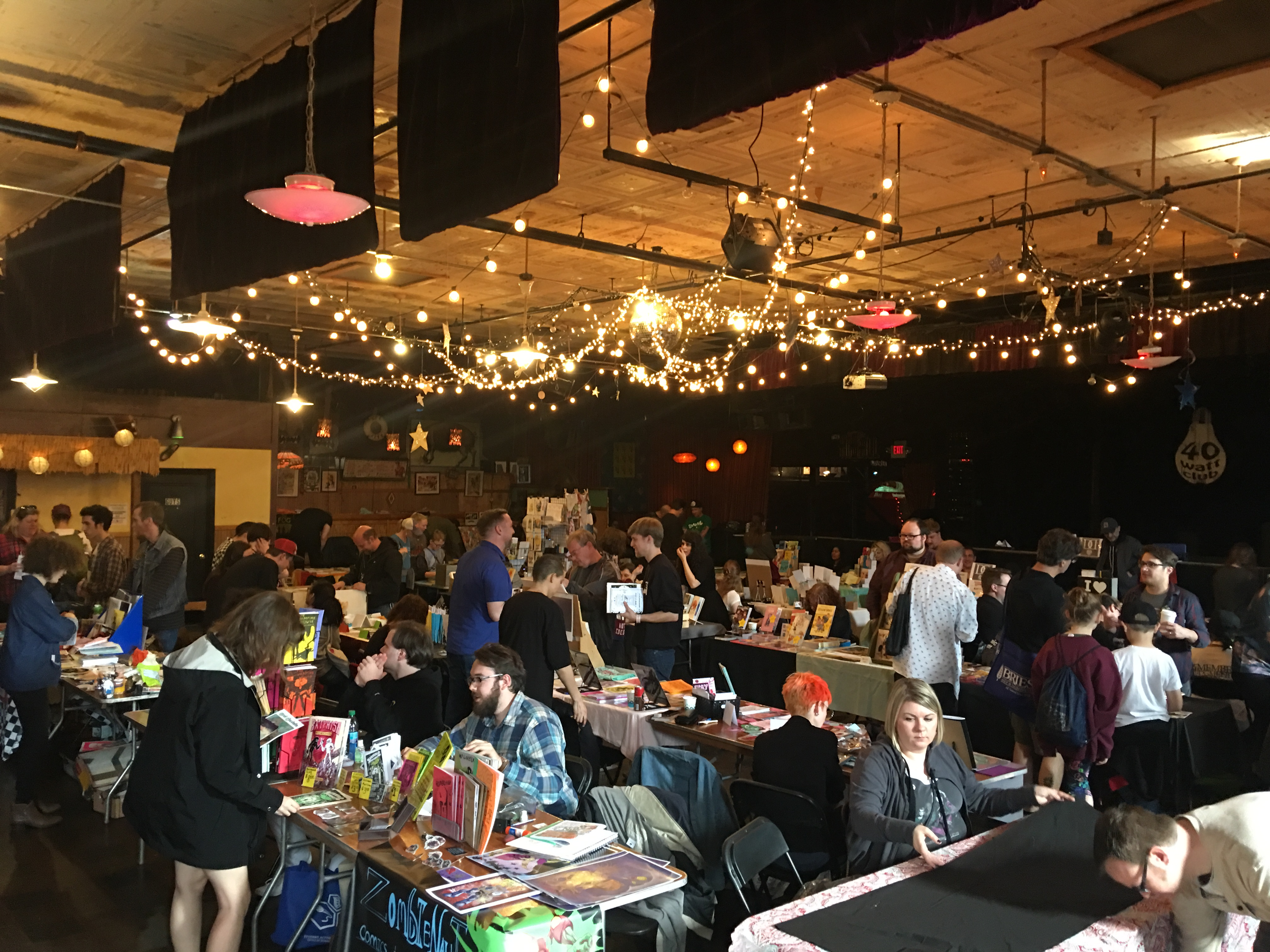
The 2018 FLUKE fest

Conceived as a venue for the discussion and exchange of timely ideas related to mini-comics, zines, and other independent publications, FLUKE is not a large comic convention or merchandising-saturated extravaganza. [...] We have kept the organization of the event as simple as possible to ensure that it remains focused on work and ideas rather than merchandising.

Co-organizer Newsome has described Fluke as a "glorified zine swap". For much of its first decade, FLUKE was held upstairs in Tasty World, a local bar and music venue. Since 2011, it has been held at the 40 Watt Club. In March 2026, the event was moved to downtown Athens venue Live Wire. It took place in January each year initially until an ice storm struck the day of the show, after which it was moved to March–April. Since 2018, the date of the event has been the final Saturday of March. The 40 Watt keeps an open bar during the event, and some years have featured complimentary cake for exhibitors. In addition to up-and-coming creators, FLUKE often features appearances from local established artists such as Joey Weiser, Eleanor Davis, and Drew Weing.

In recent years, the show has been sponsored by Bizarro-Wuxtry, Flagpole Magazine, Inch High Button Guy, Top Shelf Productions and the Sequential Artists Workshop.

The 2020 event, originally scheduled for March 28, was later rescheduled to September 5, and then cancelled altogether due to the COVID-19 pandemic.

== Event dates and locations ==
- January 19, 2002: Tasty World
- January 11, 2003: Tasty World
- January 31, 2004: Tasty World
- January 29, 2005: Tasty World
- April 1, 2006: Tasty World
- April 7, 2007: Tasty World
- April 12, 2008: Tasty World
- April 4, 2009: Tasty World
- April 17, 2010: Ciné
- April 23, 2011: 40 Watt
- April 21, 2012: 40 Watt
- April 6, 2013: 40 Watt
- April 19, 2014: 40 Watt
- April 11, 2015: 40 Watt
- April 23, 2016: 40 Watt
- April 29, 2017: 40 Watt
- March 24, 2018: 40 Watt
- March 30, 2019: 40 Watt
- March 28, 2020: 40 Watt — rescheduled and then cancelled due to COVID-19 pandemic
- March 26, 2022: 40 Watt
- March 25, 2023: 40 Watt
- March 30, 2024: 40 Watt
- March 29, 2025: 40 Watt
- March 28, 2026: Live Wire Athens
- March 27, 2027: 40 Watt

== See also ==
- STAPLE!
