= William Carlton (journalist) =

American music journalist and businessman

- Carlton around 2020
- Born: July 26, 1949; Athens, Georgia, U.S.
- Died: January 21, 2023 (aged 73); Athens, Georgia, U.S.

William Orten Carlton (July 26, 1949 – January 21, 2023) was an American music journalist and businessman. Nicknamed "Ort", he was known for his photographic memory, for his radio show and for his columns on music and local beers in the Athens Observer and Flagpole newspapers.

== Early life ==
Carlton was born in Athens, Georgia, in 1949 to William Sr. and Betty. He was given the same middle name as his grandfather, who was also known as "Ort."

He was raised in the city's Homewood Hills subdivision and remained there all of his life, except for a brief relocation to Nashville, Tennessee, in 1986. After his father's death, his mother married Buddy.

== Career ==
Carlton wrote beer and music columns for weekly Athens newspaper Flagpole. He also wrote for the Athens Observer and Tasty World magazine.

In the early 1970s, Carlton opened a record store, Ort's Oldies, on College Avenue in Athens. One of his employees was Fred Schneider, who went on to become a member of local band the B-52s. Vanessa Briscoe Hay, of Pylon, met Carlton for the first time in his shop. Between 1972 and 2022, Carlton presented Ort's Oldies, a show on WUOG, the radio station of the University of Georgia.

In January 1978, Carlton was the first person future R.E.M. guitarist Peter Buck met upon his move to Athens. "I met Ort at my first day working in the phone-booth-sized Wuxtry at College and Clayton," explained Buck. "We talked about music, and he went on his way. But he basically made a stop on his rounds pretty much every day. I got to know him really well, and liked him too. He might even have been the first person to tell me about Pylon."

When the 40 Watt Club opened its doors in 1979, Carlton worked as its doorman.

Carlton narrated the 1987 documentary Athens, GA: Inside/Out, which made him a name outside of Athens.

== Personal life ==
Carlton never married but was in a relationship with Melissa Williams, who predeceased him.

Carlton attended R.E.M.'s first show (as Twisted Kites), at St. Mary's Episcopal Church in Athens, on April 5, 1980. He named fellow Athens band Pylon as the most original band the city ever produced.

In 2015, Carlton spent the night in Athens prison after being found guilty of keeping his home, on Sharon Circle, unkempt. The community rallied and cleaned up his yard.

His favorite band was Government Cheese. He discovered them having driven from Nashville to their home of Bowling Green, Kentucky, on a whim.

== Death ==
Carlton died in 2023, aged 73. Having fallen ill, he was living with Piotr Misztal, owner of the former Copper Creek Brewing Company in Athens. A celebration of his life was held at the 40 Watt Club.

His collection of flyers and posters from Athens area music, art, theater and festivals was donated to the University of Georgia's Special Collections Libraries archive.

A petition on change.org was started by Bryan Cook to rename the Athens Post Office in Carlton's honor.

== See also ==
- Music of Athens, Georgia
