= St. Mary's Episcopal Church (Athens, Georgia) =

- The front of the church in the mid-20th century
- St. Mary's Episcopal Church
- 33°57′19″N 83°22′09″W
- Location: 394 Oconee Street; Athens, Georgia, U.S.
- Country: United States
- Denomination: Episcopal

History
- Status: Demolished (except for steeple)

Architecture
- Architect: Robert Lee Bloomfield
- Completed: 1869
- Demolished: March 1, 1990 (36 years ago)

St. Mary's Episcopal Church was an Episcopal church in Athens, Georgia, United States. Completed in 1869, it came to prominence after the musical group R.E.M., then without a name, played its first concert there in 1980.

The church was built for workers at the nearby Athens Manufacturing Company, owned by Robert Lee Bloomfield; the factory closed in 1892.

== History ==
Built in 1869, and located at the foot of Carr's Hill, the church was not named, as is commonly the case, for Mary, mother of Jesus, but for Mary Baxter, a shareholder in the factory who was recently deceased.

The first service was held at the church on April 9, 1871, by Robert Lee Bloomfield, who also designed the church. He based the design on his childhood church in his native Bound Brook, New Jersey.

Regular services were held for the next 21 years, but had stopped by 1899. Bloomfield's business closed in 1892, resulting in a marked downturn in parishioners.

The building became the headquarters of the local Red Cross in 1945, and during the 1960s it was the home of Athens-Clarke County Museum. It subsequently became apartments for University of Georgia (UGA) students.

=== R.E.M. ===
In the spring of 1979, Dan Wall, owner of Wuxtry Records, visited the property. He discovered that between the wall of the inner shell, created by the construction of the apartments, and the back wall of the original building was a large space containing the remnants of the altar. Although it had a hole in the roof and an unsound floor, under which there were two graves, Wall recognized the potential of the church as a rehearsal space and cleared it out. He lived there briefly too.

Michael Stipe during the then-unnamed band's concert at the church, April 5, 1980

Later that year, Wall moved to Atlanta to manage its branch of Wuxtry. Peter Buck, who worked for Wall at the Athens branch, expressed an interest in taking over the church that his boss was renting out. Wall sub-let the apartment to Buck, his brother Ken, Kathleen O'Brien (a bartender at Athens' Tyrone's OC and a morning-show disc jockey on WUOG) and another girl named Robyn Bragg, although it is rumored that up to 15 other people lived there as well, all contributing to the monthly rent of $350. "There were pews and a stage and 40 ft (12 m) ceilings and the old preachers were buried under the floor," explained Buck. "It was like something out of weird Tennessee Williams, this big, pink, decrepit church. It wasn’t so legendary as rumored. It was a real zoo. It was a dumpy little shithole where only college kids could be convinced to live. It was really wretched: slate falling off the walls. We lived with some girl who dealt drugs, and all of these sickos who would come over at four in the morning with 'the urge.'"

"Our first jam was in February [1980]," recalled Mike Mills, who was one of the four members of the band. "It was cold; we didn’t have any heat. It was in the back of the church. I was trying to play with gloves on and steam was coming out of our mouths. I really enjoyed what Michael and Peter were doing with the songs Bill [Berry] and I brought, and it was clearly working."

At the end of February, to celebrate her 20th birthday in just over a month's time, Kathleen O'Brien said she intended to throw a party at the church. At five weeks' notice, after a performance by John Cale at the Georgia Theatre, she asked the quartet to help provide the entertainment. They had only been practicing together for a few weeks and were less than enthusiastic with the idea. "She begged us to play," explained Berry, now also resident at the church. Mills slept on the church couch while rehearsals took place.

On April 5, 1980, Berry, Buck, Mills and Stipe played the arranged birthday concert, in support of the Side Effects, at the church, then home to Buck and his new friend Michael Stipe. The band became known as R.E.M. shortly thereafter.

=== Church demolition ===
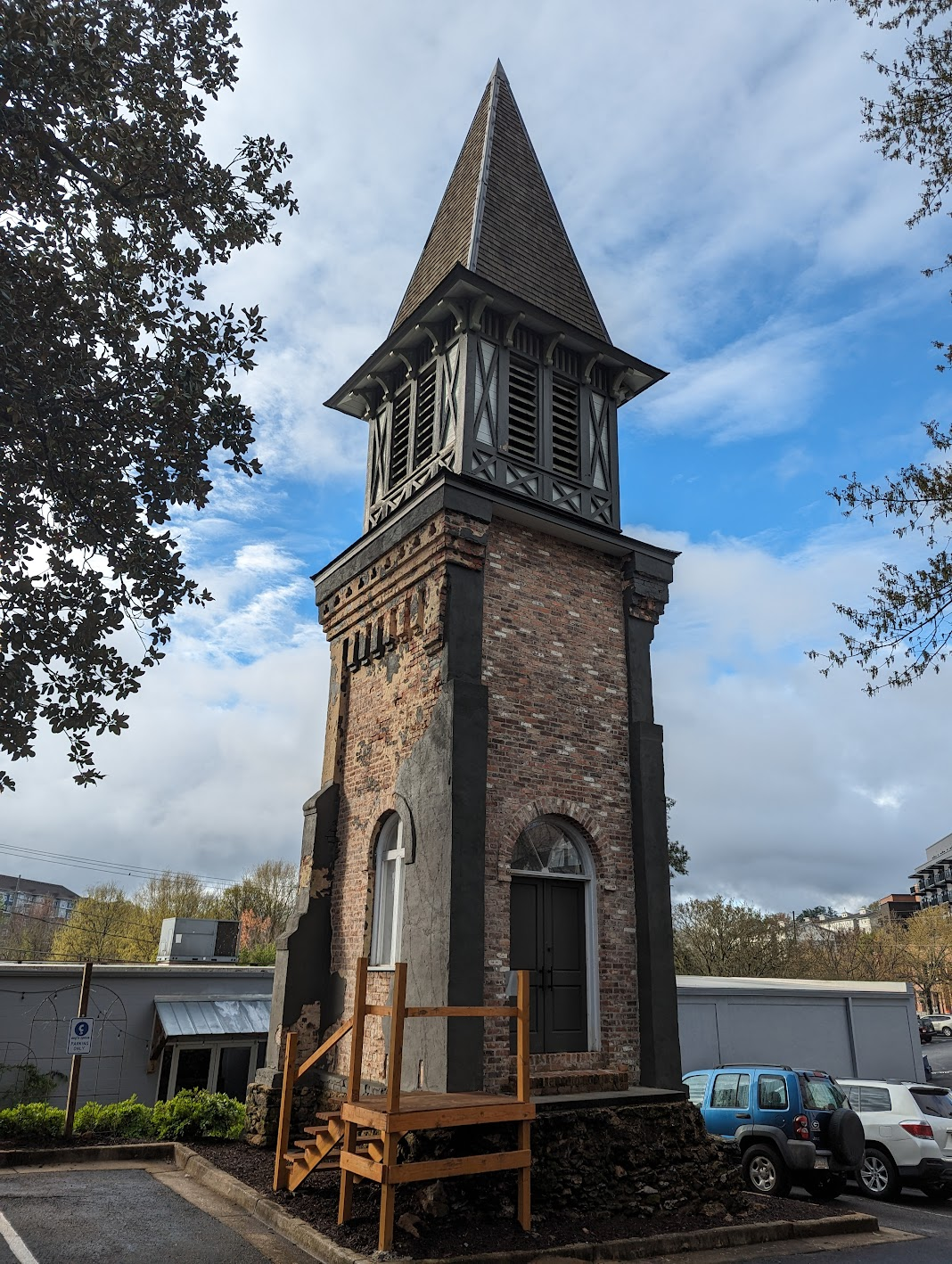
The steeple in 2024, looking south

The church was torn down on March 1, 1990, and replaced by 16 Steeplechase Condominiums. Only the steeple was spared. An out-of-state developer had purchased the church property and hired local landscape architecture firm Robinson Fisher Associates (RFA) to prepare the site-plan application and landscape plans. The developer's intention was to demolish the entire building in place of parking spaces. Brian Kent, landscape architect at RFA, convinced the developer, pending a structural evaluation, to spare the steeple, considering its significant cultural value. As a University of Georgia student in the early 1980s, Kent had attended parties there and was well aware of its R.E.M. significance. The steeple was constructed as a monolithic masonry structure and completely self-supporting; the remnant, now known as the "R.E.M. steeple", was maintained by a homeowner association until 2004.

In November 2010, a fire occurred at Rick Hawkins' print shop in front of the church at 376 Oconee Street. The shop was established in the 1970s, and the Athens magazine Flagpole was founded there in 1987. After the fire, county inspectors told the Steeplechase Condominium Association that they either needed to repair the steeple or have it torn down. Although they voted for the latter, they did not arrange its demolition.

In 2013, Nuçi's Space became the owner of the steeple. Initially, the association was only willing to sell the tower itself, not the land on which it stands. Bob Sleppy, executive director of Nuçi's Space, launched a fundraising campaign to facilitate its upkeep and build an adjacent meditation garden. Sleppy brought in Whitsel Construction, specialists in historic preservation, who removed a wall that had been part of the church but was not attached to the steeple. The project was completed in early 2020.
