= James Conklin =

James or Jim Conklin may refer to:

- James Conklin (politician) (1831–1899), mayor of Madison, Wisconsin, 1881–1883
- James Wesley "Patty" Conklin (1892–?), founder of Conklin Shows, a traveling amusement corporation in North America
- James Dean Conklin, animator of Migraine Boy
- James Conklin, actor in Teenagers from Outer Space
- Private Jim Conklin, a character in The Red Badge of Courage
