= By Any Other Name (disambiguation) =

The phrase is from a line spoken by Juliet in William Shakespeare's play Romeo and Juliet: "that which we call a rose / By any other name would smell as sweet".

"By Any Other Name" is a second-season episode of Star Trek: The Original Series.

By Any Other Name may also refer to:

- By Any Other Name, a short story collection by Spider Robinson
  - A novella by the same author, expanded into the novel Telempath
- "By Any Other Name", a short story by Santha Rama Rau
- "By Any Other Name", an episode of the British television series Holby City (series 5)
- By Any Other Name (album), a Future Sound of London compilation release
- "By Any Other Name", a song by Holman Autry Band
- By Any Other Name (Jodi Picoult novel), a 2024 novel by Jodi Picoult

== See also ==
- Bi Any Other Name, a 1991 anthology of works by bisexual authors
- "Any Other Name", a song by Thomas Newman, used in the movie American Beauty
