= Nuçi's Space =

Nuçi's Space is a resource center based in Athens, Georgia, United States, which provides rehearsal and performance space for local musicians, as well as services to support the well-being of the music community. In 2013, the company purchased the steeple of the former St. Mary's Episcopal Church. Prior to its demolition, the church was noted as being the venue for the 1980 debut performance of the band that became R.E.M.

== History ==
After her son, 22-year-old musician and University of Georgia student Nuçi Phillips, died by suicide in 1996 following a long battle with clinical depression, Linda Phillips bought and renovated an old warehouse on the edge of Athens, Georgia, into four practice rooms, a stage area, a coffee bar/lounge and a library.

Since opening its doors in 2000, Nuçi's Space has become a popular practice space for many of the 450 Athens bands, hosting benefit concerts, music workshops and a variety of other artistic endeavors. Since the mission of Nuçi's Space is to assist in the emotional, physical and professional well-being of musicians, services such as a volunteer physician twice a month to see walk in uninsured musicians, low-cost eye exams and glasses and low-cost professional ear plugs are provided, in addition to low-cost professional counseling. Nuçi's Space has been instrumental in helping local bands obtain free legal advice for contract issues, copyright law and publishing rights. A "survivors of suicide" support group meets monthly, drawing people from surrounding counties. A summer day camp gives kids the chance to develop their musical skills.

The center is funded by the Lyndhurst Foundation, Herman Goldman Foundation, Chatham Valley Foundation, Schultz Family Foundation, Kinko's, New West Records, Drive-By Truckers LLC, WNNX-FM 99X, Brian Ritchey Fund, Yamaha, the Randall Bramblett Band, among others.

== Impact ==
Nuçi's Space has repeatedly received the annual Athens Flagpole Award for being the "Biggest Supporter of the Music Community". Its reputation has spread beyond the borders of Athens, Georgia. Linda Phillips and Executive Director Bob Sleppy have been panelists at the South By Southwest Music Conference in Austin, Texas, the Future of Music Coalition in Washington, DC and Athfest. In 2003, Phillips was presented the Welcome Back Community Service Award by Eli Lilly for her work associated with depression.

As of 2009, Nuçi's Space has helped over 600 musicians receive direct financial aid for professional counseling as well as personalized follow up for each person. In 2005, over $63,000 was spent on therapy and medication assistance. In addition to Athens musicians, Nuçi's Space has helped musicians and artists in Atlanta, San Francisco, Sacramento, New York City, Nashville, Montana, Austin, and Boston.

== See also ==
- Suicide prevention
- Music industry
