= Patrick Dean (cartoonist) =

American cartoonist (1976–2021)

- Born: April 5, 1976; Rome, Georgia, U.S.
- Died: May 12, 2021 (aged 45); Athens, Georgia, U.S.
- Occupations: Cartoonist; artist; illustrator
- Spouse: Erin Josey
- Children: 2

Patrick Dean (April 5, 1976 – May 12, 2021) was an American cartoonist and illustrator from Rome, Georgia.

== Biography ==
=== Life and career ===
Dean was born in Rome, Georgia on April 5, 1976. He developed an interest in drawing as a child, and both he and his brother Alan were fond of comics. When his brother left for college in the late 1980s, attending the nearby University of Georgia in Athens, he sent Dean copies of Flagpole Magazine, a local free alt-weekly showcasing the comics of artists like Larry Tenner, Jack Logan, and Jim Stacy.

Dean later followed his brother to Athens, graduating from the University of Georgia in 1998 with a Bachelor of Fine Arts in graphic design with a focus on illustration. During these years, Dean focused on painting and drawing classes, but submitted his comics to Flagpole, where they began appearing weekly. Dean's comics appeared in the publication for over a decade; his longtime friend Robert Newsome described these comics as depicting an unusual version of Athens, "one populated with singing pies, hillbilly yetis, anxious wizards, and so very many ghosts." Much of his body of work that ran in Flagpole is available online in the Georgia Historic Newspapers database.

Dean's style was primarily influenced by Hugo Pratt, Tomi Ungerer, Jim Flora, and Jack Davis, as well as early Mad magazine. He lived and worked in Watkinsville, a town near Athens. His comics appeared in Legal Action Comics, Vice, and The Oxford American Magazine. Dean was the co-organizer, with Newsome, of FLUKE Mini-Comics & Zine Festival, a premier destination for alternative comics in the Southeastern United States. Dean was a frequent self-publisher, and published a long-running collection titled Big Deal Comics and Stories.

Dean's first and only graphic novel, Eddie's Week, was released in 2020 through Birdcage Bottom Books. Publishers Weekly reviewed the story as "a winningly comedic scenario. The result runs like Kafka as interpreted by the Three Stooges." Dean had developed the Eddie character during his time at Flagpole, and built the story for the novel over many years. In his other endeavors, Dean curated an exhibition of Jack Davis' career for the Georgia Museum of Art titled "Beyond the Bulldog: Jack Davis"; the exhibit ran between November 2012 and January 2013. He also developed a series of one-page comics summarizing HP Lovecraft stories that were posted online in 2014. The Georgia Museum of Art organized an exhibition of Dean's work, "The Monsters Are Due on Broad Street: Patrick Dean," which ran December 21, 2019, to March 29, 2020, and included an online version.

=== Illness and death ===
As he entered middle age, Dean began having unusual symptoms, including slurred speech. In 2018, he was diagnosed with amyotrophic lateral sclerosis (ALS), a fatal neurodegenerative disease that affects one's motor neurons and impacts physical function. Dean rapidly lost his speech, and began to use a wheelchair. He continued to draw on pen and paper until December 2020, after which he continued to create illustrations utilizing eye-tracking technology. Dean's final illustrations were more fiercely political, with pieces centering on racial inequality and police violence. A GoFundMe page was set up to financially support his family when Dean transitioned to hospice care in April 2021; he later died on May 12.

Dean was memorialized by many in the comics community, including Eleanor Davis and Tucker Stone. Andrea Swindall, a writer for Inside Edition, memorialized the "beloved" Dean as a "pillar of the creative community in Athens, Georgia." Dean was survived by his wife, the writer and poet Erin Josey, and his two children, Eloise and Julian.

In an interview the year before his death, Dean was asked about what drew him to comics. He replied:

Comics are such a fantastic way to tell a story for its accessibility. I've admired how it can tell its message even without words – in a world divided by tongues a pantomime comic can be understood by practically everybody around the globe. Comics appear in newspapers that can be enjoyed and tossed away or collected in seventy dollar hardbacks. But I prefer its non-precious disposable qualities. It's an artform that is rugged and can take a beating [...] and if you want to join the legion of comic makers you don't have to go broke on art supplies; scrap paper and a cheap ballpoint pen will suffice.

== Bibliography ==
- Eddie's Week (2020, ISBN 978-1-73315-092-7)
