= Robert Lee Bloomfield =

American businessman (1827–1916)

- Born: December 1827; Rahway, New Jersey, U.S.
- Died: 1916 (aged 88 or 89); Athens, Georgia, U.S.
- Resting place: Oconee Hill Cemetery, Athens, Georgia, U.S.
- Occupation: Businessman
- Years active: 1848-1892
- Board member of: North Eastern Railroad
- Spouse: Ann Warren Rodgers (1851–1896; her death)

Robert Lee Bloomfield (December 1827 – 1916) was an American businessman and church-founder.

== Early life ==
Bloomfield was born in Rahway, New Jersey, in 1827. His father, Richard, died when Robert was nine.

== Career ==
In 1849, Bloomfield moved south to Athens, Georgia, where he opened a men's clothing store on the city's Broad Street.

He was appointed the first assistant engineer of Athens' first volunteer fire department, the Independent Hook and Ladder Company, in May 1857.

With W. F. Herring, Bloomfield purchased controlling interest in Athens Manufacturing Company. Bloomfield became its manager. By 1868, the factory had 75 looms, 3,000 spindles and 175 operators, who produced 10,000 yards of cotton cloth and 7,500 pounds of cotton yarn.

Bloomfield purchased the Cook and Brother Armory Building in 1870, as well as 63 acres of land and housing. He built several cottages for his operatives.

In 1872, he became the first board president of the North Eastern Railroad. Later, he was amongst those who established the Athens and Western Railroad, of which he also served as its president for a period.

Thirteen years later, Bloomfield had established a pottery that produced sewer and drain pipes, as well as "jugware of all kinds". The clay was sourced on Sandy Creek and shipped down the river.

A flood during the overnight of January 24 and January 25, 1892, caused significant damage to the lower factory of Athens Manufacturing, causing it to close.

Bloomfield established the Barnett Shoals Factory on the Oconee River in 1890. His son, Dr. James Bloomfield, opened the sluice gates. Its success was short-lived, however, for it was bankrupted by 1897.

== Personal life ==
Bloomfield married Ann Warren Rodgers on September 17, 1851, in Bound Brook. Their first child, daughter Caroline, died at the age of eight weeks.

The couple were living on Clayton Street in Athens by 1854; their son, Robert Kearny Bloomfield, was born on January 9 that year.

Seven years later, in 1861, they built a home on Waddell Street, where their next child, another daughter, Elizabeth, was born on December 7.

Despite his hailing from the north, Bloomfield was a supporter of the South's Confederate States Army during the American Civil War. He served as a private.

After the war, in 1867, Bloomfield paid for the rebuilding of a block of Athens' downtown when it was destroyed in a fire.

In the late 1860s, he had built St. Mary's Episcopal Church on Oconee Street in Athens, naming it for deceased shareholder Mary Baxter. It was completed in 1869, and consecrated on Easter Day 1871. Bloomfield delivered the first sermon. Its design was copied from a church that Bloomfield attended as a child in Bound Brook, New Jersey. After a financial depression hit Athens, resulting in a large fall in parishioners, the church closed in 1899.

=== Death ===
Bloomfield died in 1916, aged 88 or 89. He is buried with his wife, who preceded him in death by ten years, at Oconee Hill Cemetery in Athens.

In 1931, the tower of Athens' Emmanuel Episcopal Church, for which Bloomfield "labored from the beginning", was erected in his honor.
