= Athens-Clarke County Library =

Library in Georgia, U.S.

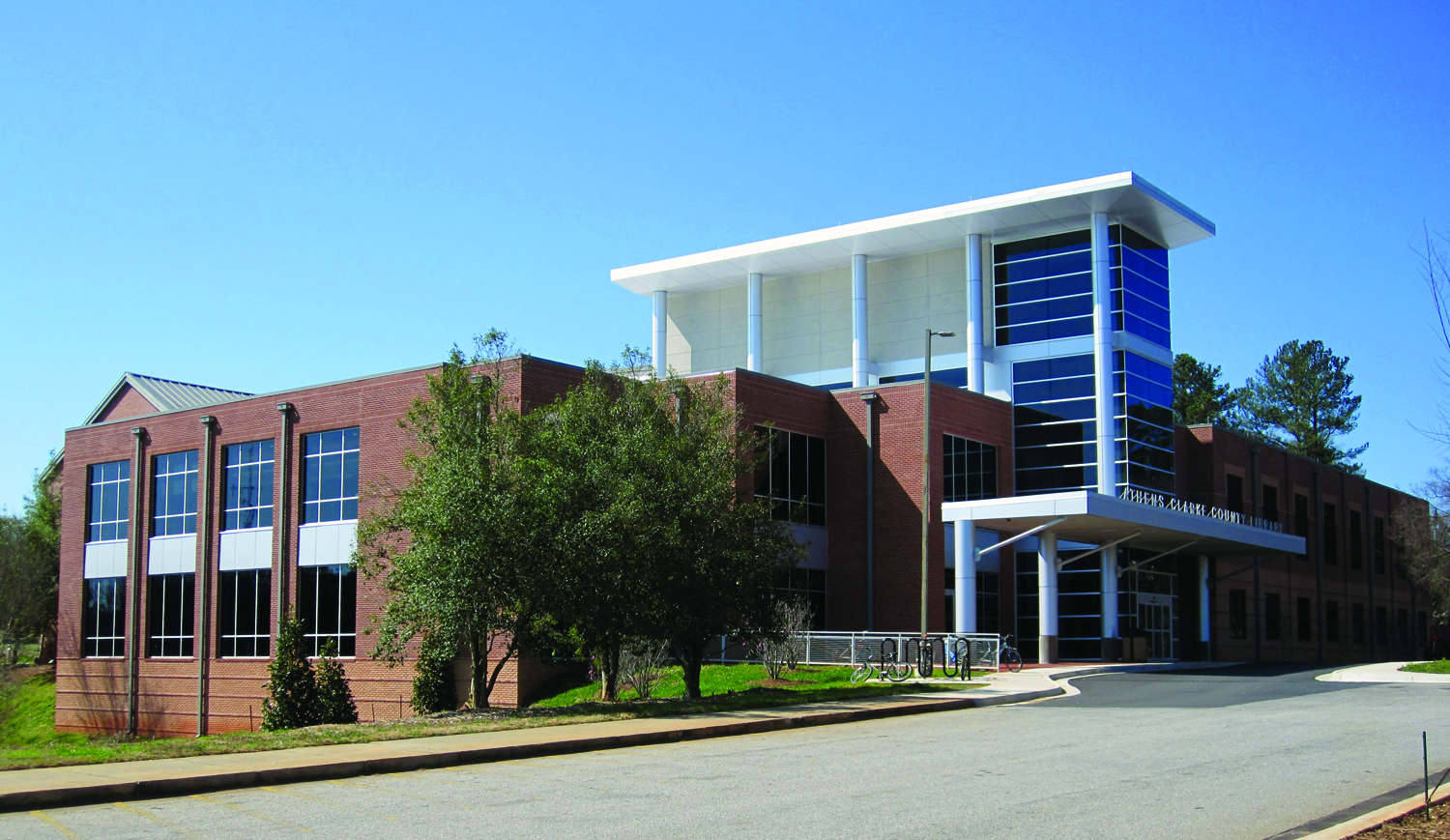
- Library viewed from parking lot entrance
- Location: 2025 Baxter Street Athens, Georgia 30606, United States
- Type: Public Library
- Established: 1936
- Branch of: Athens Regional Library System

Other information
- Website: www.athenslibrary.org/athens

The Athens-Clarke County Library is the headquarters and main branch of the Athens Regional Library System. It is located in Athens-Clarke County, Georgia . The structure contains two stories that are open to the public. It contains a YA Department, Children's Department, and Heritage Room, which maintains a local archival collection about Clarke and surrounding counties.

== Branch history ==
In March 1936, the Athens Woman's Club expanded and renamed the library the Athens Public Library. The Library Board of Trustees worked with the Library Commission, WPA, city officials and community leaders. The new location was in a building adjacent to the National Bank of Athens on East Broad Street. The grand opening was held on April 7; the new library contained over 1,000 books. Patrons could borrow one volume of fiction and one volume of non-fiction for two weeks. The library provided services to six schools. During the first year of operation, 13,901 books were circulated and 1,977 patrons were registered. The library held Saturday story hours for children. The following year, circulation had quadrupled and new programs were added, including a weekly radio program. After much deliberation over an alternate space over 1937, the library moved in October 1937 to the YMCA building at the corner of Lumpkin and Broad Streets.

With WPA assistance, the Athens Regional Library was formed in 1940, making it the first regional library in the state. Upon expansion, the Library Board included representatives from Clarke, Oconee, and Oglethorpe counties. Part of this assistance was the addition of a truck to serve as a Bookmobile and the addition of a paid librarian to staff it for the first eighteen months, after which the librarian would be paid by the county. These resources served Clarke County plus 13 schools and 14 communities in Oglethorpe County, and seven schools and 15 communities in nearby Oconee County.

In 1942 and throughout World War Two the Athens Library was designated by the American Library Association as a war information center. After the war, in 1947, the library Board raised $50,000 to purchase the Stern House and a vacant lot at the corner of Hancock and College Avenue, next to the First Presbyterian Church. The house, built in 1830, was remodeled and furniture and equipment were donated, and on March 13, 1949, the new library was dedicated.

The Athens-Clarke Branch moved again in 1970 to Dougherty Street. In this location, the Athens-Clarke County Library gained a Talking Books Center in 1975. Talking Books was a part of the Books for the Blind program and is also referred to as the Georgia Libraries for Accessible Statewide Services (GLASS). GLASS or Talking Books remained a part of the Athens-Clarke Branch until 2019.

In 1989 the library Board of Directors settled on a lot for a new library building on Baxter Street. In 1991, because of the city-county unification, the library was officially named the Athens-Clarke County Library. The new building opened on Baxter Street on April 27, 1992, featuring a Young Adult section, Talking Book Center, and Heritage Room. Beginning in 1994, the library offered internet access, one of the first libraries in the state to do so, with six internet computers.

The Baxter Street building was remodeled in April 2013 to add 19,000 square feet to the library, adding space to the Heritage Room and to public meeting spaces. The project was funded through SPLOST 2005 funds.

Since 1997, the Library began an Endowment fund using money from a National Endowment for the Humanities Challenge Grant. The endowment is still active as of 2021. The endowment has assisted in building additions like the Appleton Auditorium, as supported by a matching grant in February 2012.

=== Dunbar branch ===
The Dunbar Library Branch opened in 1942 as part of the Athens Regional Library System. The branch was named after Black writer Paul Laurence Dunbar. At opening, the library was located in the Knox Building at the corner of Pope and Reese streets. In September 1965, the Dunbar Branch was relocated to 1127 W. Hancock Street, occupying the second floor of the building. From the time of its opening to its closure and merger with the Athens-Clarke Library in 1970, the Dunbar Branch was one of 13 public libraries that served Black residents of Georgia. Librarians at the Dunbar Branch also extended services to Black schools in Athens.

== Awards and grants ==
The Athens-Clarke County Library received the Public Library Association's Library Innovation Award in 2007. The award recognizes public library's innovative and creative service programs for their community.

The Library received a two-year grant in 2008 from the Financial Industry Regulatory Authority Investor Education Foundation (FINRA) and the American Library Association (ALA) called "Smart Investing @ Your Library" to support financial literacy in the community. The Library hosted a program called "Money Matters" to assist low income workers with low educational attainment with investment classes, integrate financial literacy education into GED preparation programs at five community sites, and expand partnerships with local organizations like Clarke County schools and the University of Georgia College of Family and Consumer Sciences. One such class, "Personal Finance and Using Credit," was conducted along with the Public Interest Project at the University of Georgia School of Law in March 2009. UGA law students presented a program on personal finance and using credit cards, and an attorney was present to answer audience questions.

ACCL was awarded an EBSCO grant in 2017 to pay for the installation of a solar array, a “Sunshine Garden” solar garden, on its campus. The two structures are a Solar Spotlight Curve solar power tree and a Smartflower solar flower. The library has hosted a variety of sustainability-related events in the past, such as the annual “Green Life Expo,” which seeks to educate local businesses and families about how to reduce their carbon footprint. As part of the grant, the library partnered with local schools to create a STEM solar lab to demonstrate solar energy to children, and hosted a seminar for adults on retrofitting homes with solar panels in conjunction with the library's “Reflecting, Sharing, Learning” programming. The solar array has also been used to provide teaching resources on sustainability to the local Athens community. The solar array has been featured in local news, and may be upgraded during Fall 2021 to include a rooftop solar array if approved by Clarke County Commissioners. If approved, it will supply 16% of the energy used by the library.

ACCL has received four grants and awards from the Institute of Museum and Library Services (IMLS). In 2004, the library received a National Leadership Grants for Libraries to build upon an existing partnership with the Lyndon House Arts center to better serve the local Mexican-American community via educational and cultural programs. The grant provided funds for the library to establish a Community Library Center in conjunction with GPLS and conduct literacy and language, English language, and vocational classes. This grant led to the creation of the Pinewoods Spanish Language Branch, Biblioteca y Centro Educativo de la Comunidad Pinewoods, the following year in 2009. The library was awarded a second National Leadership Grant in 2010, again partnering with Lyndon House Arts Center. This grant funded the outreach program "The Boomers: Reflecting, Sharing, Learning" which targeted the aging Baby Boomer population. It included local advisers who guided the project to meet the needs of the Boomer population. Its aim was to provide lifelong learning opportunities for and by older, active adults, and expanding museum and library services through creative use of new technology employing live webcasts and a video archive of these programs.

In 2018, the library received a Library Community Catalyst Grant from IMLS, to partner with the University of Georgia School of Social Work to become a trauma-informed library through a project called Trauma Informed Library Transformation (TILT). The library and university established a program to place social work student interns at the library to identify specific needs of at-risk community members, and to share information about social services while advocating for those who have difficulties accessing services. After social work students were embedded in the library, the library staff was trained, and then library environment and policies were inspected to ensure they were trauma-informed. TILT interns began in October 2018 and received specialized trauma training and education. Staff began training in January 2019. The project included a year-long after school program to teach leadership skills to young girls and established a peer-mentoring program at the library. The grant-funded partnership enabled the Athens-Clarke County Library to become the first specialized trauma-informed library in the state and one of a few in the nation. The program received additional funding from IMLS in 2019.

The library has also received three American Dream grants (2012, 2018), a partnership between the American Library Association and Dollar General Store, to support family literacy. The grant received in 2018 helped set up Culinary Classes in conjunction with English lessons to boost confidence in cooking and English.
