= Migraine Boy =

American comic strip by Greg Fiering

A typical scene in Migraine Boy comics

Migraine Boy is a weekly comic strip created by cartoonist Greg Fiering, which has been published in several mainstream printed media and TV.

Usually presented in black and white six-panel strips, the comic is set in a typical American suburban neighbourhood backyard, and deals with a bad-tempered boy suffering from chronic migraines, and his interaction with his neighbor who constantly approaches him trying to befriend him.

The stories have a grim, sometimes absurd or surreal sense of humor, and often end up with Migraine Boy reacting violently to the irritation produced by his neighbor.

== History ==
The comic strip made its first appearance in 1992 in the Seattle-based Hype magazine.

Over the course of the years, it was also published in other printed media, such as the Spy magazine, Flagpole Magazine, the Village Voice, UTNE Reader, The Baffler, Rolling Stone, and Entertainment Weekly.

In 1994, the US rock band R.E.M. chose Fiering to create the album cover for their ninth studio album Monster, after lead singer Michael Stipe saw Migraine Boy in the Flagpole magazine. This ultimately resulted in Flagpole introducing Stipe and Fiering to each other, and Migraine Boy being featured in the album's inside booklet.

A year later, in 1995 a 64-page book, called Migraine Boy's Fairweather Friends (ISBN 9780312143695), was published in the US by St. Martin's Griffin, featuring an introductory text written by Stipe.

In 1996, animation studio GreenHead Media produced a series of twelve thirty-second short clips for MTV, animated by James Dean Conklin, which were aired as fillers over the duration of that year.

Later, in year 2000, a second book, titled I Don't Love You!: The Best of Migraine Boy (ISBN 9780943151915) was published by Slave Labor Graphics.

In 2001, Fiering and Conklin independently produced an animated short film called Migraine Boy: The Bet, technically superior to those aired on MTV, which featured colored 3D graphics.

Since June 2010, Fiering has been posting new Migraine Boy comics on the official "Migraine Boy and Pals" website; the most recent Migraine Boy content was published in 2014.

== Awards ==
The Migraine Boy website was nominated for the 1997 Webby Awards, in the "Art and Design" category.

== Characters ==
Migraine Boy
Bearing gritted teeth and a permanent frown, Migraine Boy is the main character of the strip, and the one that gives it its name. Although his real name is never clearly stated, it is suggested to be "Joey" in the episode named "Blossom". He appears as a bad-tempered young boy with his migraine symbolized in the comic strips as wiggly lines around his head. In MTV's animated version, the migraine is also accompanied by a pulsating low sound, and the appearance of the wiggly lines and the intensity of the sound apparently respond to Migraine Boy's level of irritation.
Migraine Boy's neighbor
Appearing in mostly all of the strips, Migraine Boy's overly joyful neighbor is the most recurring character besides Migraine Boy himself. Despite his name never being mentioned, he has unofficially come to be known as Aspirin Boy. His interventions in the comic strips often consist of him trying to cheer up Migraine Boy, most frequently by trying to play games with him (usually dress-up ones), or trying to find ways to relieve him from his headache. He is also shown to frequently have the necessity to love and be loved by Migraine Boy. In numerous episodes, suggestions are even made that his feelings for Migraine Boy go beyond those of friendship and sometimes tend towards homosexual love, which disgusts Migraine Boy even more than usual.

Because there is seldom continuity or consistency in Migraine Boy, the strip can have him kill his neighbor in the last panel.

Tylenol
Named after the popular painkiller often used to treat migraines, Tylenol is Migraine Boy's Shih Tzu pet dog. Although he is rarely seen, he has been shown to be able to perform human-like tasks such as talking or weightlifting.
