= Athens Symphony Orchestra =

American symphony orchestra in Athens, Georgia

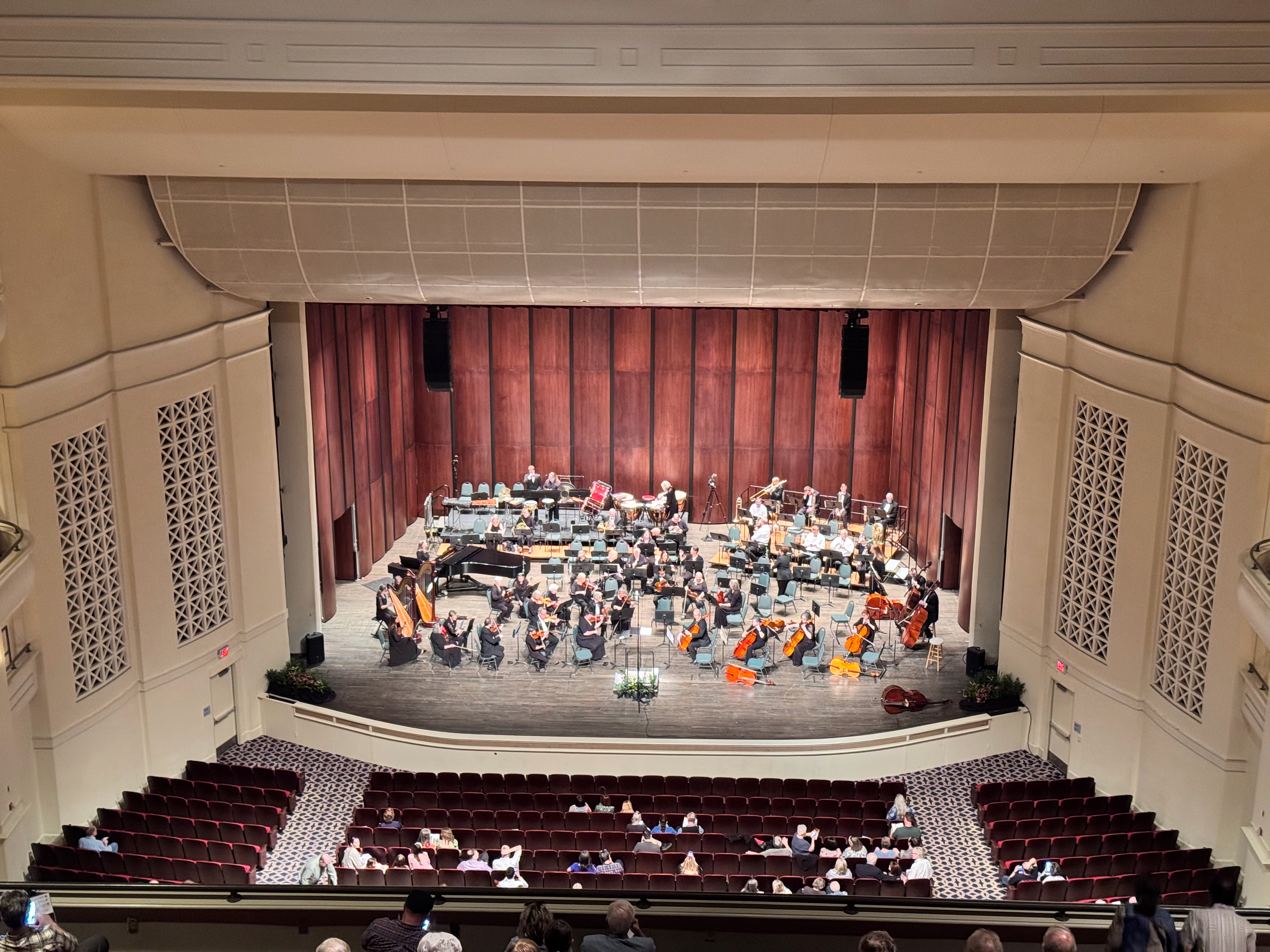
The Athens Symphony Orchestra prepares to perform at the Classic Center

The Athens Symphony Orchestra is an orchestra based in Athens, Georgia, United States. The orchestra was formed in 1978.

== History ==
The first conductor was Albert Ligotti and performances began on April 28, 1979, at Clarke Central High School's Mell Auditorium. Its current home is the Classic Center, where rehearsals are in the Ligotti Room. The orchestra's offerings include a fall, spring, Christmas and pops concerts. The current conductor is Brad Maffett. Susan Dinwiddie served first as assistant and then associate conductor from May, 1997, to September, 2012. She then was conductor from 2012 to 2022.

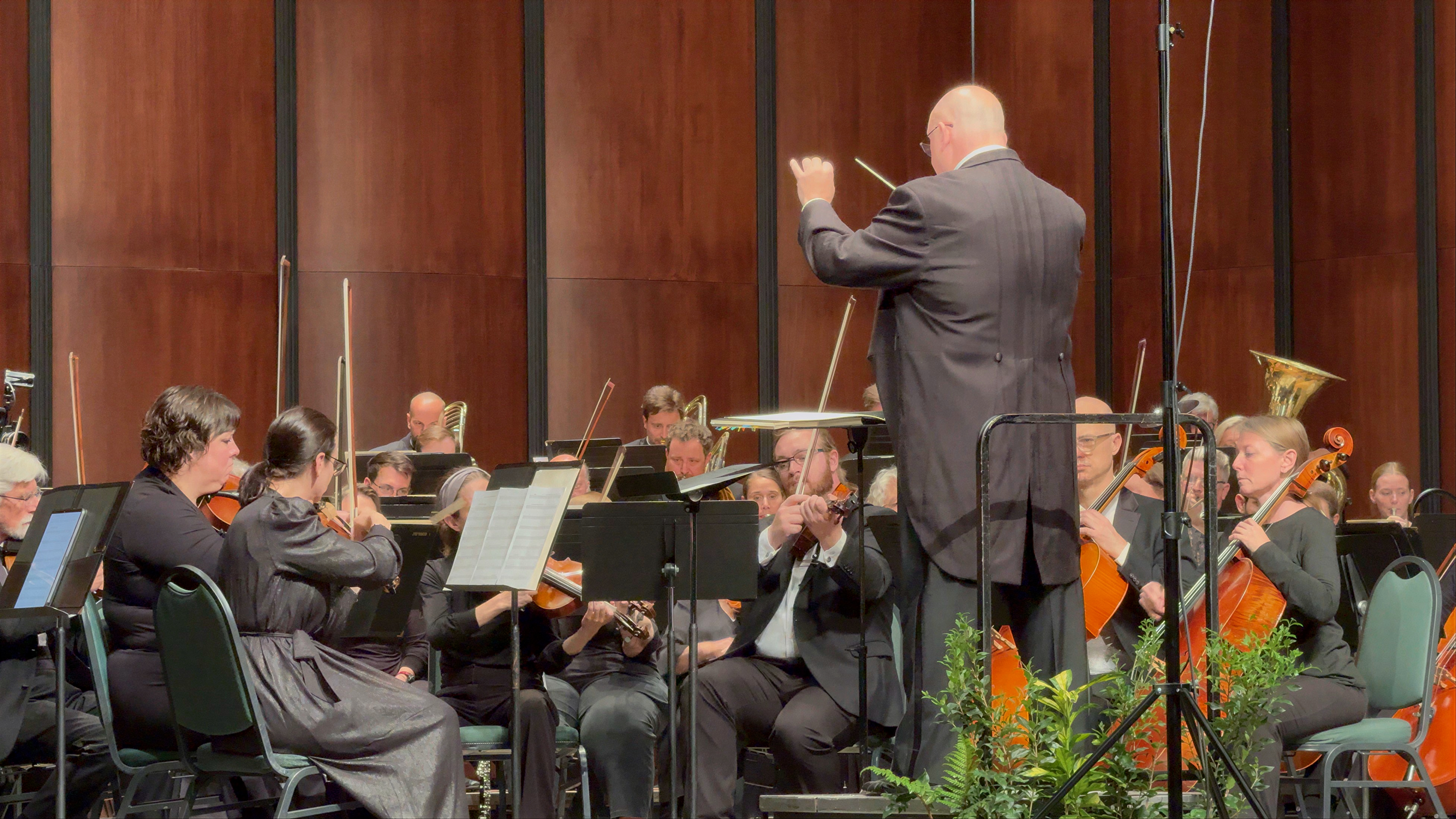
Brad Maffett conducts the orchestra

The Athens Symphony has a governing board consisting of 17 business and community leaders, who serve as elected directors and officers. The governing board ensures the symphony operates sustainably and soundly (on financial terms). as a financially sound, regarding the symphony as a volunteer community asset.
