= 170 College Avenue =

Historic building in Athens, Georgia

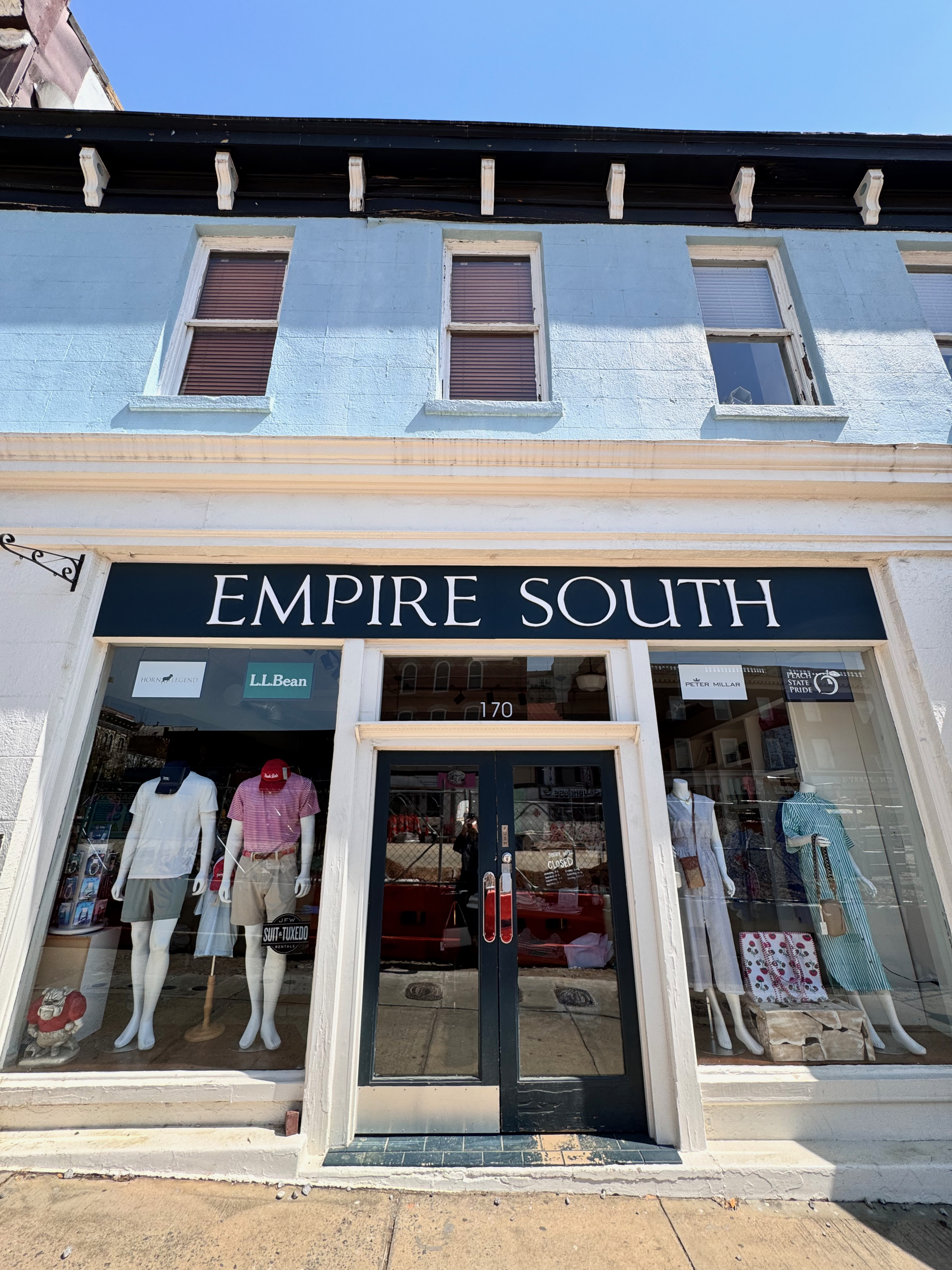
- 170 College Avenue as a clothing retailer in 2026
- Interactive map of the 170 College Avenue area

General information
- Location: Athens, Georgia, U.S., 170 College Avenue
- Coordinates: 33.958326°N 83.37519°W

170 College Avenue is a historic building in Athens, Georgia, United States. It became notable as the office of the band R.E.M. between 1995 and 2011, having moved from West Clayton Street (where their rehearsal studio remained).

In 1909, the property was the home of Rosa A. Von der Lieth's art embroidery materials and fancy goods. The following year, The Citizens Bank and Trust Company moved there from 197 East Clayton Street. Immediately prior to becoming the home of R.E.M./Athens LLC, it was the office of attorneys Winburn, Lewis & Barrow.
