= Andrew N. Shearer =

Public Figure

- Born: 1977 (age 48–49); Atlanta, Georgia, United States
- Occupations: Director, producer, screenwriter, photographer, musician, journalist, actor
- Years active: 1989–present

Andrew N. Shearer (born 1977) is an underground filmmaker, journalist and punk rock musician living and working in the region of Athens, Georgia. He is the co-founder with actress and filmmaker Monica Puller of Gonzoriffic Films, a DIY arts collective which has produced dozens of short and feature-length microcinema films since its founding in 2001. Shearer has served as the sole owner and operator of Gonzoriffic since 2012.

== Early years ==
Shearer directed, shot and edited an educational video on teen pregnancy for Dekalb County School System at the age of 13. In 1990, he co-founded the local improvisational comedy project ADTV with his brother David and friend Matt Comegys, producing several short films for which he earned extra credit in junior high classes. Shearer and Comegys formed their first punk band in 1992, playing together in various combinations throughout their teens. In 1996, Shearer founded B-Movie fanzine Gonzoriffic while working as a video store manager, and brought it to the Internet in 1998.

== Gonzoriffic Films ==
Shearer met actress Monica Puller in 1999 and co-founded Gonzoriffic Films with her in 2001. Composed of local actors, musicians and visual artists, Gonzoriffic made its public debut in the summer of 2004 after the 1st Annual Sprockets Music Video Competition at the 40 Watt Club in Athens, Georgia, with a midnight screening of their no-budget horror comedy PsychoVixens. Gonzoriffic went on to play dozens of festivals both regionally and worldwide, producing over 80 films, including the 2017 compilation Space Boobs in Space. Shearer cites cult filmmakers John Waters, Russ Meyer and Ed Wood among his influences.

Gonzoriffic's films are produced completely outside of the standard movie industry. The stated mission of the collective is "to provide quality alternative entertainment with a strong focus on innovative, positive roles for women in film.".

The feminist themes, campy humor and progressive work ethic of the Gonzoriffic team have attracted many collaborators and supporters, such as Priscilla Lee Presson. In 2004, Shearer met fellow independent filmmaker Henrique Couto at a convention and returned home with a number of his films. The result of this meeting was the collaborative Faces of Schlock series of DVD releases, including many short films in which Shearer participated as a writer or director. Author and video game developer Arinn Dembo is a supporter of Shearer's work, and performed a cameo role in the 2006 re-make of the Gonzoriffic classic Cannibal Sisters. Shearer served as cinematographer, editor and co-producer of Monica Puller's directorial debut Fox Holes in 2009. In 2010, he co-produced and distributed Rachael Deacon's A Fever and a River.

In 2008, Shearer began hosting yearly midnight Gonzoriffic screenings at Athens Ciné theater in downtown Athens, Georgia. These shows consist of the films Shearer and his crew produce throughout the previous months and also feature photography and art exhibits.

British newspaper The Guardian described Gonzoriffic as "new film-makers who have torn up the rule book."

Technology news site The Next Web called Gonzoriffic's 2017 anthology Space Boobs in Space "the Citizen Kane of our time."

== Music ==
Shearer played in several Atlanta punk bands as a teen, including the Fetal Pigs (lead vocals, 1991–1992), Evergreen (lead vocals, 1992–1994), and Thumper (guitar, 1994–1995). He also played bass guitar for Athens hip-hop artist Curtison "Son 1" Jones and contributed guitar, bass and drums to albums by Henrique Couto.

From 2003 to 2009, he played in a band called Female Trouble with Gonzoriffic co-founder Monica Puller. The band was formed in fall of 2003 to participate in a benefit concert for the RAINN charity. Shearer played guitar for Female Trouble, as well as supplying background vocals. Monica Puller performed as the lead vocalist and played keyboards and guitar. Actress and Gonzoriffic alumnus Mitsu Bitchi played bass guitar and provided backing vocals. Justin Freeborn and independent filmmaker Daniel Heisel, writer and director of Jesus H. Zombie, both played drums. Influences on the band include PJ Harvey, Bikini Kill, The Gits, Patti Smith and Joan Jett. As a live act, Female Trouble performed for special events and benefit shows only, specifically causes that supported women in some way. Female Trouble also composed and performed original music for the Gonzoriffic short films Scab (2005), Two in the Pink (2006) and Blood Witch (2008).

Shearer and Mitsu Bitchi wrote and recorded two new tracks for the 2010 Gonzoriffic film Dollface, which also featured Bitchi in an on-screen performance.

Matt Comegys, who grew up with Shearer and appeared alongside him in all his earliest films and bands, currently composes and performs the bulk of the original music for Gonzoriffic.

== Feminism ==
Shearer is a feminist known for his stance on many women's issues, in particular the representation of women in film. He has publicly stated that his goal is "offer a progressive, audacious image of women" intended to serve as an alternative to standard Hollywood depictions. He is also active in feminist political and social causes. He has worked as a volunteer at a rape crisis center, and traveled to different schools and youth clubs in the Athens, Georgia, area conducting prevention programs.

In February 2010, Shearer directed the Women in Horror Film Festival, presenting a two-hour theatrical program of horror films directed by women. The event drew the attention of Viscera Film Festival founder Shannon Lark, who collaborated with Shearer to bring the Viscera World Tour to Athens, Georgia, in February 2011.

Shearer served as a judge for the 2011 Viscera Film Festival along with Allison Anders, Shersy Benson, Joe Bob Briggs, Drew Daywalt, Mick Garris, Stacy Hammon, Frank Henenlotter, Heidi Honeycutt, Jamie Jenkins, Mary Lambert, Shannon Lark, Lucky McKee, Hannah Neurotica, Katt Shea, Annette Slomka and Elizabeth Stanley.

In 2012, Shearer entered into a creative partnership with Athens, Georgia-based burlesque troupe Effie's Club Follies. Members of the troupe have since appeared in numerous Gonzoriffic productions.

== Filmography ==
- Pop Goes the Evil (2001)
- Cannibal Sisters (2002)
- Kill the Movie (2003)
- Hero Cookie (2003)
- Psychovixens (2004)
- Around Midnight (segment "Wake Up!") (2004)
- Faces of Schlock (segment "Buttonhead") (2005)
- Scab (2005)
- Socks and Violence (2006)
- Cannibal Sisters (remake)(2006)
- Two in the Pink (2006)
- Fit Me (2007)
- Fake Blood (VOD title: "Fangs For Nothing") (2007)
- I'm in the Basement (2008)
- Blood Witch (2008)
- Erotic Couch (2009)
- DollFace (VOD title: "Goodbye Dolly") (2010)
- Dr. Humpinstein's Erotik Castle (2011)
- One Nine Hundred (2011)
- Mae of the Dead (2012)
- Pajama Nightmare (2012)
- Powerless (2013)
- Bikini Gorilla (2013)
- The Gash (2013)
- Barbara (2013)
- The Underground Sinema (2015)
- Late Night Cable (2016)
- Space Boobs in Space (2017)
- Bad Girl Dracula (2019)
- Arreola Jones and the Home Video Vixens (2020)
- Jugsaw (2022)
- Zombikini (2024)
