= Holman Autry Band =

- Origin: Danielsville, Georgia, US
- Genres: Southern rock, Country rock, Instrumental rock
- Years active: 2006–present
- Members: Brodye Brooks; Casey King; Joshua Walker; Brandon Myers

Holman Autry Band is an American Southern rock band which consists of four Madison County, Georgia natives: Brodye Brooks, Casey King, Josh Walke, and Brandon Myers.

Influences include Lynyrd Skynyrd, The Allman Brothers Band, Gov’t Mule, Stevie Ray Vaughan, Ronnie Milsap, Eagles, Eric Clapton, Metallica, Hank Williams, Sr., and many other musicians with expressive talent.

== History ==
Holman Autry Band, after only being together for just over 14 years, has won the "Athens, GA Battle of the Bands" and sold out the Georgia Theatre in Athens, Georgia many times. The band played venues all over the States of Georgia, South Carolina, Tennessee, North Carolina, and Florida. The band consists of four self-taught musicians. Brodye Brooks (lead guitar and vocals), Casey King (vocals and bass guitar), Josh Walker (vocals and rhythm guitar), plus Brandon Myers (drums).

== Sounds ==
Holman Autry Band has a distinct sound. This makes categorization into a particular genre difficult. Holman Autry Band would most often fall into the Southern rock to Country rock category. However, Holman Autry Band and their fans prefer to consider their genre a new type of country music entitled 'Black Label Country'. Some of their songs depict the "I'm not taking it anymore" attitude with songs such as "Calling You Out" and "By Any Other Name". Holman Autry Band will also show you their musical talent with "Fruition", along with their love for music with "Glory Days". They will also display fun-loving songs such as "Whiskey Wagon" and "Dark Haired Woman". With songs such as "Wildest Dreams", "Summer Day" and "This One's for You", they will show their sensitive side.

Holman Autry Band is known for the way they do cover songs. Exceptional cover songs include the Allman Brothers' "Midnight Rider" and "Come and Go Blues" and David Allan Coe's "The Ride".

== Discography ==
- Holman Autry Band

Tracks
1. "Whiskey Wagon"
2. "Glory Days"
3. "Good at Lovin' You"
4. "Press On"
5. "By Any Other Name"
6. "St. Andrews Cross"
7. "Fruition"
8. "Dark Haired Woman"
9. "Wildest Dreams"
10. "Callin' You Out"
11. "Summer Day"
12. "A Night or Two"
13. "This One's For You"

- Sweet Southern Wind

Tracks
1. "Sweet Southern Wind"
2. "Hear Me Callin'"
3. "The Next Time"
4. "Still Loud, Still Proud"
5. "In A Little While"
6. "Gypsy"
7. "Long Nights"
8. "New Breed"
9. "Watch You Go"
10. "I Ain't Bitter"
11. "State of Peace"

- Nashville Sessions

Tracks
1. "Fruition"
2. "St. Andrew's Cross"
3. "Dark Haired Woman"
4. "Press On"
5. "Fruition 2"

== See also ==
- Southern rock
- Country rock
- Instrumental rock
