= WUOG =

Radio station at the University of Georgia

- Athens, Georgia; United States
- Broadcast area: University of Georgia
- Frequency: 90.5 MHz

Programming
- Format: College radio

Ownership
- Owner: University of Georgia

History
- First air date: October 16, 1972
- Call sign meaning: "University of Georgia"

Technical information
- Licensing authority: FCC
- Facility ID: 66624
- Class: C2
- ERP: 26,000 watts
- HAAT: 55 meters (180 ft)
- Transmitter coordinates: 33°56′59.4″N 83°22′57.5″W

Links
- Public license information: Public file; LMS
- Webcast: Listen live
- Website: Official website

WUOG (90.5 FM) is a student-run college radio station licensed in Athens, Georgia. The station serves the Athens area and is owned by the University of Georgia.

== History ==
The station first broadcast on October 16, 1972, with a 3,200 watt signal. In 1977, WUOG's wattage was increased to 10,000 watts, and in 1994 the station reached its current 26,000 watts, making it one of the most powerful college stations in the country. The transmitter sits atop § Brumby Community on the UGA campus, broadcasting at an effective radius of 60 miles or 100 km.

With the exception of a period of time in 1981 and 2005 when the station was shut down for non-compliance of Federal Communications Commission (FCC) rules, WUOG has operated for 18 to 24 hours each day. The station is maintained and run entirely by a 200-student staff of volunteers. 17 executive members (as of April 2026) oversee the staff and the day-to-day operation of the station.

WUOG offers regular rotation programming as well as specialty shows. "Rotation" consists of new and old music of any genre that falls within the bounds of WUOG's music philosophy. Once stated as the axiom "If they don't need us, we don't need them", the music philosophy strives to include artists whose music is rarely heard elsewhere. WUOG also carries specialty show programming ranging from Vocaloid to new wave, oldies to local artists. News shows, talk shows and sports shows air throughout the week. The program "Live in the Lobby," broadcast on Tuesday and Thursday each week, features live on air in-studio sessions from local Georgia musical artists.

It was on WUOG that R.E.M. were first broadcast; a live recording of "Hippy, Hippy Shake" was played in the summer of 1980. Drummer Bill Berry was also in a short-lived combo of radio personalities from the station, known as the WUOGerz.

In late June 2006, it was discovered that the station was causing electromagnetic interference to a nuclear chemistry laboratory on campus. To alleviate this, the station temporarily went off-air on weekdays from 7 a.m. to 4 p.m. while the lab work was done. Electronic filters eliminated the problem on July 13, allowing WUOG to return to a normal schedule.

On February 21, 2009, the lobby of the new WUOG station inside of the Tate Student Center was named in honor of Wilbur Herrington. The Wilbur Herrington Lobby memorializes Wilbur's service as station engineer since the station's first broadcast in 1972. Herrington had received help in the early stages of applying for an FCC license from broadcast engineers at Athens commercial station WRFC(AM) (960 kHz), chiefly Larry Melear (a graduate of the UGA School of Broadcasting) and Everett Langford.

== See also ==
- William "Ort" Carlton
- Athens, GA: Inside/Out
- List of college radio stations in the United States
- Music of Athens, Georgia
