= Flagpole Magazine =

Weekly newspaper in Athens, Georgia, U.S.

- The September 27, 2006 front page of Flagpole Magazine
- Type: Alternative weekly
- Format: Tabloid
- Owner(s): Flagpole, Inc.
- Publisher: Alicia Nickles
- Founded: 1987 (39 years ago)
- Headquarters: 220 Prince Avenue; Athens, Georgia 30603; United States
- Circulation: 13,383
- OCLC number: 30323514
- Website: flagpole.com

Flagpole Magazine, often abbreviated to simply Flagpole, is an American alternative newsweekly that focuses on the cultural and political scene of Athens, Georgia, home to the University of Georgia, and its surrounding communities. It was founded by Jared Bailey and Dennis Greenia in 1987; it is currently published by Alicia Nickles and co-owned by Nickles and Pete McCommons. Publishing under the banner "Colorbearer of Athens, Georgia," Flagpole covers local events like the Wild Rumpus Halloween Parade, AthFest Music Fest, and the Athens Twilight Criterium. The publication covers politics, art, theater, movies, books, food, local comics, and advice columns in Athens and surrounding areas.

Flagpole is an independent and locally owned newspaper and distributed weekly and free of charge. It is suggested by the Athens Welcome Center to be one of three print news sources in Athens, alongside the Athens Banner-Herald and The Red & Black, the independent student weekly. Flagpole and The Red & Black are the two news sources that provide free print news to the community.

== Coverage ==
=== Music ===
Flagpole remains critically important for its coverage of the Athens music scene, particularly of the 1990s until today. Bands like Pylon, the B-52s, and R.E.M. began in Athens in the late 1970s and into the 1980s, hosted at clubs like the 40 Watt Club and Georgia Theater. Flagpole began to cover these acts during their rise to national prominence, beginning in 1987, through interviews, record reviews, and concert listings. This coverage continued as Athens acts like Widespread Panic, Vic Chesnutt and Elephant 6 Collective bands like Of Montreal and Neutral Milk Hotel became known in the 1990s. Flagpole continues to cover local bands that have Athens connections like Dead Confederate, the Whigs, and alt-country bands such as the Drive-By Truckers.

Flagpole is a supporter of music events around town like AthFest and Athens PopFest. The publication partners with AthFest to award the Flagpole Local Music Awards to pioneering Athens artists. Past winners have included of Montreal, Elf Power, Vic Chesnutt, Widespread Panic, R.E.M., and Olivia Tremor Control. More recent winners include indie band Family and Friends and rapper Linqua Franca (also known as Mariah Parker).

Capitalizing on its music coverage, Flagpole created Christmas CDs for several years in a row that featured many Athens local bands performing various holiday songs including one CD of spoken-word material. The Flagpole Christmas Album featured Drive-By Truckers performing "Rudolph the Red-Nosed Reindeer".

=== Political and social coverage ===
Flagpole covers political topics in Athens and the surrounding areas as well as responses to social issues occurring in the city and county. In 2020 and 2021, Flagpole published comprehensive coverage of Black Lives Matter protests held in the city. Flagpole coverage of Proud Boys and Alt-right activity in the area was cited in a 2020 work examining Alt-Right activity over the 2010s.

Ongoing coverage by Health reporter Jessica Luton over 2020 and 2021 detailed and collated all information about COVID-19 testing, case numbers, deaths, and vaccinations from Athens and the surrounding Northeast Georgia Health District.

=== Community involvement ===
In addition to its weekly issues, Flagpole, Inc. also publishes the annual Flagpole Guide to Athens, a listing of bars, restaurants, and entertainment options in Athens.

Flagpole is also known for running the Flagpole Favorites section yearly, in which Athenians vote on their favorite local businesses in a variety of categories.

=== Comics ===
Migraine Boy was one of the comic strips within the magazine.

The current comics rotate among Missy Kulik (Tofu Baby), David Mack (A Round Town), Klon Waldrip, and Joey Weiser. The paper also publishes the syndicated comic This Modern World by Tom Tomorrow.

One of the prominent cartoonists who published in Flagpole was Patrick Dean, who drew a weekly strip for Flagpole from 1997 to 2006. He also drew covers for the publication from 1998 to 2003. His work was given an exhibit in the Georgia Museum of Art in 2019.

== See also ==
- William "Ort" Carlton, writer for Flagpole
