= Wuxtry Records =

American record store

- Company type: Music retailer
- Industry: Record store
- Founded: March 1976, Athens, Georgia, United States
- Headquarters: Georgia, United States
- Area served: Worldwide (ships to US and international destinations)
- Services: New and used music sales
- Owners: Dan Wall and Mark Methe
- Website: wuxtryrecords.com

Wuxtry Records is an independent record store in Athens, Georgia, that has operated since 1976. Its flagship shop is located at the corner of College Avenue and Clayton Street in downtown Athens, and is the oldest continuously operating record store in the state. The company was founded by Dan Wall and Mark Methe, and has operated several locations over the course of its history. Methe operates a shop under the Wuxtry name in Decatur, Georgia, which opened in 1978. The name also extends to Bizarro-Wuxtry, a comic shop that operates on the top floor of the Athens location, that focuses on rare comics, unusual toys and other novelties.

Wuxtry has played a large role in the culture of Athens and its eclectic music scene for over four decades. Many notable musicians and artists have worked at the shop, including Peter Buck of R.E.M., Kate Pierson of the B-52's, and Danger Mouse. Wuxtry has been routinely named as one of the best and most influential record stores in the U.S. by Rolling Stone and USA Today, among others.

== Background ==
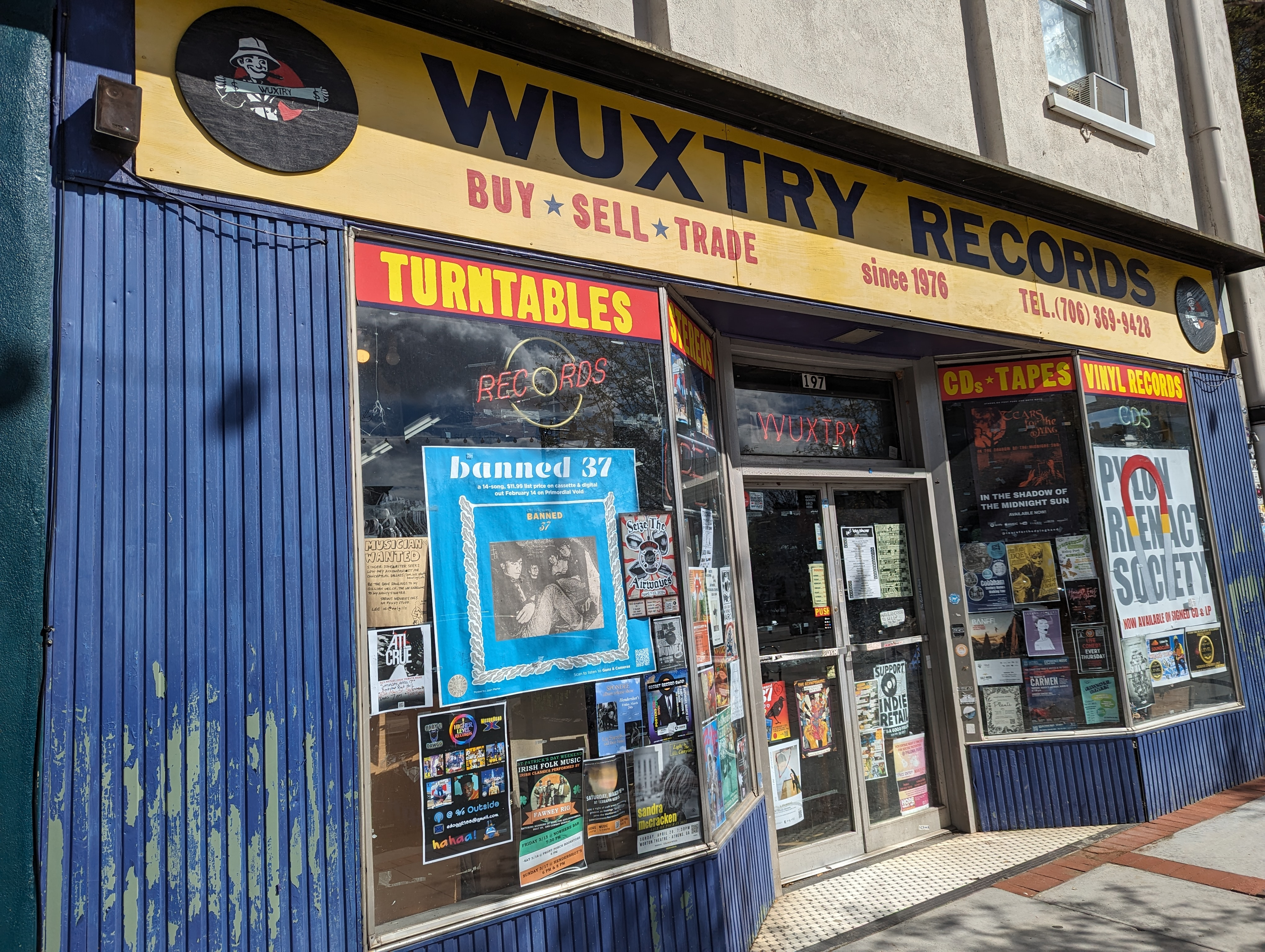
Wuxtry's flagship shop in Athens, Georgia.

Wuxtry Records was founded by Dan Wall and his business partner Mark Methe, both of whom moved from Chicago with the intent of opening a record store in a college town. The duo had little training in running a business, but were fans of music and records. They first nearly settled on Morgantown, West Virginia, home to West Virginia University, but on the recommendation of a friend they passed through Athens, Georgia, and decided to stay. The name of the store originates from the comic Boy Commandos by Joe Simon and Jack Kirby, which featured paperboys fighting Nazis—their Brooklyn accents turned "extra" into "wuxtry".

The first iteration of Wuxtry opened on Foundry Street in Athens on March 1, 1976. It sold new LPs and cassettes, as well as buying and selling used records, books and comics. The store moved to its current spot on Clayton Street three months later, where it has remained since. Methe opened a location in Decatur, Georgia, east of Atlanta, in 1978, and also continues to operate it to this day. The company also opened a third location on Baxter Street in Athens that year which has since closed. Wuxtry moved into a larger adjacent storefront in 1989, and began stocking posters and T-shirts in addition to records and CDs. In 1992, it spun off its books-and-comics operation into Bizarro-Wuxtry—named for Bizarro World from DC Comics—which opened upstairs. The very small original corner location now operates at Sidecar, which exclusively sells discounted vinyl and opened in 2013.

Wuxtry is notable for having employed numerous famed musicians over the course of its history. Guitarist Peter Buck started at the Decatur location and transferred to the Athens shop, where he met vocalist Michael Stipe. The two bonded over their taste in punk rock music, and founded the band R.E.M. in 1980, which became one of the best-selling rock bands in history. Kate Pierson was one of the company's first employees, and garnered acclaim in the 1980s as part of the B-52's. Brian Burton—later known as the Grammy Award-winning musician and DJ Danger Mouse—worked at the store in the mid to late 1990s. John Fernandes, of many Athens groups, including the Olivia Tremor Control, worked at Wuxtry for over two decades. Other artists who have at times worked for Wuxtry include Mike Richmond of Love Tractor, Mike Green of The Fans, and Dana Downs of Go Van Gogh.

The shop has been named one of the best record stores in the U.S. by Rolling Stone, Vinyl Me, Please, Business Insider, and USA Today.
