= The Apples in Stereo discography =

- Studio albums: 7
- Extended plays: 4
- Live albums: 1
- Compilation albums: 4
- Singles: 9
- Miscellaneous: 11

This article is a detailed listing of releases by the indie pop band The Apples in Stereo.

== Discography ==
=== Studio albums ===
Title	Released	Sources
Fun Trick Noisemaker	May 2, 1995	
Tone Soul Evolution	September 30, 1997	
Her Wallpaper Reverie	June 8, 1999	
The Discovery of a World Inside the Moone	April 18, 2000	
Velocity of Sound	October 8, 2002	
New Magnetic Wonder	February 6, 2007	
Travellers in Space and Time	April 20, 2010	

=== EPs ===
Title	Released	Sources
Tidal Wave 7"	June 1993	
Hypnotic Suggestion EP	1994	
Look Away + 4	February 22, 2000	
Let's Go!	July 17, 2001	

=== Live albums ===
- Live in Chicago (2001)

=== Compilation albums ===
- Science Faire (1996)
- Sound Effects (September 4, 2001)
- Electronic Projects for Musicians (April 1, 2008)
- #1 Hits Explosion (September 1, 2009)

=== Singles ===
- "Time for Bed/I Know You'll Do Well" (1994) 7" split single with The Olivia Tremor Control
- "Onto Something" (1996) 7" split single with Sportsguitar
- "Man You Gotta Get Up" (1998) 7" single
- "Everybody Let Up" (2000) 7" single
- "The Bird That You Can't See" (2000) 7"/Promo CD single
- "Please" (2002) CD single
- "That's Something I Do" (2002) Promo CD single
- "On Your Own" (2002) Promo CD single
- "Holiday Mood" (2006) Digital download (MP3)
- "Colors" (2007) 7" Split single with Patience Please
- "Dance Floor" (2010) CD single

=== Miscellaneous releases ===
- "Too Much Now", The Horizon Center, (1993)
- "Avril En Mai", Pop Romantique (1999)
- "Signal in the Sky (Let's Go)", The Powerpuff Girls: Heroes and Villains (2000); also featured in the series' fourth-season episode "Superfriends"
- "The Oasis", Kindercore Fifty: We Thank You (2002)
- "Liza Jane", Dimension Mix (2005)
- "The Apples in Stereo Theme", website release (2006)
- "Stephen, Stephen", MySpace site download (2006)
- "Helium", YepRoc exclusive download (2006)
- "Mirror", YepRoc exclusive download (2006)
- "No One Can See Me Like You Do", Yes, I'm a Witch (2007)
- "Atom Bomb", YepRoc exclusive download (2007)
- "B.B.W. (Remix)", Miki Furukawa - BONDAGE HEART REMIXES (2008)
- "That's My Family", Yo Gabba Gabba! Hey! (2017); also featured in the series' second-season episode "Family"
