= Number 1 Hits Explosion =

#1 Hits Explosion

Greatest hits album by The Apples in Stereo
- Released: September 1, 2009
- Recorded: 1995–2007
- Genre: Indie pop
- Length: 49:58
- Labels: Yep Roc Records; Elephant 6
- Producer: Robert Schneider

The Apples in Stereo chronology
| Electronic Projects for Musicians (2008) | #1 Hits Explosion (2009) | Travellers in Space and Time (2010) |

Professional ratings
Review scores
| Source | Rating |
|---|---|
| Allmusic | 4.5/5 stars |
| Classic Rock | 7/10 stars |
| Pitchfork Media | (7.5/10) |
| Popmatters | (8/10) |

#1 Hits Explosion is a greatest hits compilation album by The Apples in Stereo. It was released on September 1, 2009, by Yep Roc Records. The album culls songs from various LPs and EPs released by the band between 1995 and 2007.

An accompanying booklet for the album features liner notes by Jeff Kuykendall of the Elephant 6-related website Optical Atlas.

A six-song EP titled #2 Hits Explosion is available exclusively to those who order the album via the band's official website.

== Track listing ==
All tracks composed by Robert Schneider except "Tidal Wave", composed by Schneider and Chris Parfitt; "20 Cases Suggestive of..." and "Winter Must Be Cold", composed by Hilarie Sidney; and "Can You Feel It?" composed by Schneider and Bill Doss.

| # | Song title | Time | Year | Original release |
|---|---|---|---|---|
| 1. | "Energy" | 3:32 | 2007 | New Magnetic Wonder |
| 2. | "Go!" | 3:14 | 2000 | The Discovery of a World Inside the Moone |
| 3. | "Strawberryfire" | 4:21 | 1999 | Her Wallpaper Reverie |
| 4. | "Tidal Wave [Radio Remix]" | 3:25 | 1995 | Fun Trick Noisemaker |
| 5. | "Please" | 2:27 | 2002 | Velocity of Sound |
| 6. | "The Rainbow" | 2:40 | 2000 | The Discovery of a World Inside the Moone |
| 7. | "Seems So" | 3:19 | 1997 | Tone Soul Evolution |
| 8. | "Same Old Drag" | 3:23 | 2007 | New Magnetic Wonder |
| 9. | "The Bird That You Can't See" | 3:55 | 2000 | The Discovery of a World Inside the Moone |
| 10. | "Shine a Light" | 3:21 | 1997 | Tone Soul Evolution |
| 11. | "20 Cases Suggestive of..." | 2:52 | 2000 | The Discovery of a World Inside the Moone |
| 12. | "Ruby" | 3:06 | 1999 | Her Wallpaper Reverie |
| 13. | "Signal in the Sky (Let's Go)" | 2:58 | 2001 | Let's Go! |
| 14. | "Can You Feel It?" | 4:10 | 2007 | New Magnetic Wonder |
| 15. | "Winter Must Be Cold" | 3:16 | 1995 | Fun Trick Noisemaker |
| 16. | "Sun is Out" | 2:29 | 2007 | New Magnetic Wonder |

=== #2 Hits Explosion track listing ===
All tracks composed by Robert Schneider except "Touch the Water", composed by Jim McIntyre; and "Yore Days", composed by Eric Allen.

| # | Song title | Time | Year | Original release |
|---|---|---|---|---|
| 1. | "What's the #?" | 3:32 | 1997 | Tone Soul Evolution |
| 2. | "Stream Running Over" | 3:14 | 2000 | The Discovery of a World Inside the Moone |
| 3. | "Tin Pan Alley" | 4:21 | 1997 | Tone Soul Evolution |
| 4. | "Touch the Water" | 3:25 | 1994 | Hypnotic Suggestion |
| 5. | "Yore Days" | 2:27 | 2002 | Velocity of Sound |
| 6. | "She's Just Like Me/Taking Time" | 2:40 | 1995 | Fun Trick Noisemaker |
