= Electronic Projects for Musicians =

Compilation album by The Apples in Stereo
- Released: April 1, 2008
- Recorded: 1995–2007
- Genre: Indie pop, indie rock, garage rock
- Length: 31:16
- Label: Simian Records; Yep Roc Records; Elephant 6
- Producer: Robert Schneider

The Apples in Stereo chronology
New Magnetic Wonder (2007)	Electronic Projects for Musicians (2008)	#1 Hits Explosion (2009)

Electronic Projects for Musicians is a b-sides and rarities compilation album by the indie rock band The Apples in Stereo. It was released April 1, 2008 under the Simian Records, Yep Roc Records, and Elephant 6 labels. It can be seen as a companion to Science Faire, a 1996 compilation that collects recordings from the band released prior to their first album.

Announced by frontman Robert Schneider in May 2007, Schneider described Electronic Projects for Musicians as having "all of our non-LP material since Fun Trick Noisemaker came out" — a time period that spans 12 years. Electronic Projects for Musicians does include most of the band's non-LP material released while the band was signed to spinART Records, excluding songs found on the Look Away + 4 and Let's Go! EPs, due to licensing issues.

The song "Dreams", an unfinished recording intended for release on the band's 1997 LP Tone Soul Evolution, is included on Electronic Projects for Musicians with newly recorded instrumentals.

In late 2007, fans were invited to remix the song "Can You Feel It?" from the most recent Apples LP, New Magnetic Wonder. Over 20 master tracks from the song's production were made available for download. The grand prize winning song (dubbed the "Mild Davis remix") was available for download with purchase of Electronic Projects for Musicians.

The title of the compilation comes from the book of the same name by Craig Anderton.

== Track listing ==
All tracks composed by Robert Schneider except "Avril en Mai" (Schneider, Chris McDuffie)

#	Song title	Time	Year	Original release	Label
1.	"Shine (in Your Mind)"	3:36	1995	Fun Trick Noisemaker (Japanese release)	Trattoria / Polystar records
2.	"Thank You Very Much"	1:03	1995	Fun Trick Noisemaker (Japanese release)	Trattoria / Polystar records
3.	"Onto Something"	2:14	1996	7" split single with Sportsguitar	100 Guitar Mania Records
4.	"Man You Gotta Get Up"	3:01	1998	Tone Soul Evolution bonus 7"	spinART Records
5.	"The Golden Flower"	3:05	1998	Tone Soul Evolution bonus 7"	spinART Records
6.	"Avril en Mai"	2:10	1999	Pop Romantique compilation	Emperor Norton Records
7.	"Hold on to This Day"	3:21	2000	The Discovery of a World Inside the Moone bonus flexi-disc	spinART Records
8.	"The Oasis"	2:09	2000	The Discovery of a World Inside the Moone (Japanese release)	Trattoria / Polystar Records
9.	"On Your Own"	1:55	2001	Untitled CD-R promo compilation	spinART Records
10.	"Other"	2:19	2002	Velocity of Sound (Japanese release)	Trattoria / Polystar Records
11.	"So Far Away"	4:25	2002	"Please" UK single b-side	Cooking Vinyl Records
12.	"The Apples Theme Song"	1:18	2006	Introductory song for official website, previously unreleased	–
13.	"Stephen Stephen"	1:50	2006	Previously unreleased, appeared on The Colbert Report	–
14.	"Dreams"	3:43	2008	Previously unreleased outtake from Tone Soul Evolution	–

== Personnel ==
=== The Apples in Stereo ===
- Robert Schneider - guitar, lead and backing vocals, keyboard, additional instrumentation.
- John Hill - guitar, backing vocals, percussion.
- Hilarie Sidney - drums, lead and backing vocals, percussion.
- Eric Allen - bass, backing vocals, percussion.
- Chris McDuffie - keyboard, backing vocals, additional instrumentation.

=== Production ===
Electronic Projects for Musicians was produced by Robert Schneider. It was engineered by The Apples in Stereo and Jim McIntyre, with assistant engineering by Ron Marschall. Songs were recorded on four-track, eight-track and sixteen track tape machines and/or utilized the Mainframe Computer at Pet Sounds Recording Studio in Denver, Colorado (1993–2002) and Lexington, Kentucky (2002–2006). The album was mastered from vinyl, flexi-disc, tape and digital sources by Fred Kevorkian in New York City.

Artwork for the album is by Steve Keene. Art photography by Joshua Kessler. Design by Dave Laney.

Professional ratings
Aggregate scores
Source	Rating
Metacritic	68/100 link
Review scores
Source	Rating
Allmusic	link
Robert Christgau	link
Crawdaddy!	(favorable) link
Pitchfork Media	link
Tiny Mix Tapes	link
