= Sound Effects: 1992–2000 =

Sound Effects

Compilation album by the Apples in Stereo
- Released: September 4, 2001
- Genre: Indie pop

The Apples in Stereo chronology
| Let's Go! (2001) | Sound Effects (2001) | Velocity of Sound (2002) |

Professional ratings
Review scores
| Source | Rating |
|---|---|
| AllMusic | link |

Sound Effects is a 2001 compilation album by indie pop Elephant Six group The Apples in Stereo. The album was originally released in the United Kingdom and Japan as an introduction to the band that spans music from 1992 to 2000. It features remastered songs from other albums as well as exclusive radio mixes and acoustic outtakes.

== Track listing ==
All tracks are written by Robert Schneider except where noted.

1. "Motorcar"
2. "Touch the Water" (J. McIntyre)
3. "Time for Bed/I Know You'll Do Well"
4. "Tidal Wave [Radio Mix]" (R. Schneider/C. Parfitt)
5. "Lucky Charm [Radio Mix]"
6. "Winter Must Be Cold" (H. Sidney)
7. "Seems So"
8. "Tin Pan Alley"
9. "Ruby"
10. "Strawberryfire"
11. "20 Cases Suggestive of..." (H. Sidney)
12. "The Bird That You Can't See"
13. "Not the Same [Acoustic]" (R. Schneider/C. Parfitt)
14. "She's Just Like Me [Acoustic]"
- Track 1 was originally released on the self-titled Apples EP in 1993.
- Track 2 was originally released on the Hypnotic Suggestion EP in 1994.
- Track 3 was originally released on a 7" split EP with The Olivia Tremor Control in 1994.
- Tracks 4 and 5 are exclusive radio mixes of songs from the 1995 album Fun Trick Noisemaker.
- Track 6 was originally released on Fun Trick Noisemaker.
- Tracks 7 and 8 were originally released on Tone Soul Evolution in 1997.
- Tracks 9 and 10 were originally released on Her Wallpaper Reverie in 1999.
- Tracks 11 and 12 were originally released on The Discovery of a World Inside the Moone in 2000.
- Tracks 13 and 14 are exclusive acoustic tracks.
