= Travellers in Space and Time =

Studio album by the Apples in Stereo
- Released: April 20, 2010
- Genre: Indie pop, neo-psychedelia
- Length: 51:09
- Label: Simian; Elephant 6; Yep Roc
- Producer: Robert Schneider, Bryce Goggin

The Apples in Stereo chronology
#1 Hits Explosion (2009)	Travellers in Space and Time (2010)

Singles from Travellers in Space and Time
- 1. "Dance Floor" Released: October 29, 2010

Professional ratings
Aggregate scores
Source	Rating
Metacritic	72/100
Review scores
Source	Rating
AllMusic	4/5 stars
Llama's Pajamas	8.5/10
Pitchfork	7.3/10
Slant Magazine	2/5 stars
Tiny Mix Tapes	4/5 stars

Travellers in Space and Time is the seventh studio album by the Apples in Stereo released in 2010. It was the first album by the band to feature new drummer John Dufilho, as well as the first to cite Bill Doss and John Ferguson as permanent band members. It is heavily influenced by the Electric Light Orchestra, especially their science-fiction concept album Time.

== Background ==
"Dance Floor" was the first single released for the album. The video for the song features actor Elijah Wood, who signed the Apples in Stereo to his label Simian Records, and previously directed the video for their song "Energy". "Dance Floor" along with a few other tunes were popular among shoppers as they were featured on playlists for such stores as Forever 21, Hollister Co., and Old Navy.

== Track listing ==
All tracks are written by Robert Schneider, except where noted.

No.	Title	Length
1.	"The Code"	0:23
2.	"Dream About the Future"	4:16
3.	"Hey Elevator"	3:46
4.	"Strange Solar System"	0:59
5.	"Dance Floor"	4:03
6.	"C.P.U."	3:40
7.	"No One in the World"	4:17
8.	"Dignified Dignitary" (Robert Schneider, Bill Doss, John Hill)	3:22
9.	"No Vacation" (Robert Schneider, John Ferguson)	3:56
10.	"Told You Once"	3:58
11.	"It's All Right"	3:38
12.	"Next Year at About the Same Time" (Eric Allen)	3:09
13.	"Floating in Space" (John Dufilho)	2:34
14.	"Nobody But You"	4:21
15.	"Wings Away" (Bill Doss, John Ferguson)	2:48
16.	"Time Pilot"	2:30
Total length:		51:09

Japanese edition
No.	Title	Length
1.	"The Code"	0:23
2.	"Dream About the Future"	4:16
3.	"Hey Elevator"	3:46
4.	"Strange Solar System"	0:59
5.	"Dance Floor"	4:03
6.	"C.P.U."	3:40
7.	"No One in the World"	4:17
8.	"Dignified Dignitary" (Robert Schneider, Bill Doss, John Hill)	3:22
9.	"No Vacation" (Robert Schneider, John Ferguson)	3:56
10.	"Told You Once"	3:58
11.	"It's All Right"	3:38
12.	"Next Year at About the Same Time" (Eric Allen)	3:09
13.	"I Opened My Eyes"	0:44
14.	"Floating in Space" (John Dufilho)	2:34
15.	"Non-Pythagorean Composition No.5"	1:37
16.	"Nobody But You"	4:21
17.	"Wings Away" (Bill Doss, John Ferguson)	2:48
18.	"Time Pilot"	2:30
Total length:		53:54

== Personnel ==
Adapted from liner notes.

The Apples in Stereo

- Robert Schneider - acoustic guitar, electric guitar, Mellotron, piano, electric piano, synthesizer, lead and background vocals, Vocoder, additional instrumentation
- John Hill - acoustic guitar, electric guitar, handclaps, backing vocals
- John Dufilho - drums, electric guitar, bass, handclaps, percussion, sound effects, synthesizer, lead and background vocals
- Bill Doss - acoustic guitar, handclaps, Mellotron, melodica, electric piano, synthesizer, cowbell, lead and background vocals
- Eric Allen - bass guitar, electric guitar, handclaps, background vocals
- John Ferguson - electric guitar, handclaps, Mellotron, piano, electric piano, synthesizer, lead and background vocals, Vocoder

Additional

- Rick Benjamin - trombone
- Merisa Bissinger - flute, piccolo
- Rob Christiansen - trombone
- Russ Farnsworth - spoken word on track 1
- Dave Ferris - tabla
- Roger Ferguson - background vocals
- Christin Helmuth - background vocals
- Otto Helmuth - background vocals
- Heather McIntosh - cello
- Craig Morris - drums on track 6, acoustic guitar
- David Schneider - acoustic guitar
- Dan Sjogren - baritone sax

Production

- The Apples in Stereo - engineer
- Kevin Brown - engineer
- John Dufilho - producer on track 13
- Dan Efram - executive producer, management
- Roger Ferguson - engineer
- Bryce Goggin - electronic effects, engineer, mixing, producer
- Otto Helmuth - assistant engineer
- Merritt Jacob - assistant engineer
- Fred Kevorkian - mastering
- Jimi Mitchell - album artwork
- Craig Morris - assistant engineer, mixing, producer on track 6
- Robert Schneider - producer
- Adam Sachs - engineer
- Paul Stec - design, layout
- Carolyn Suzuki - design, layout
- Rebecca Turbow - illustration
