= Pet Sounds Studio =

Recording studio in Denver

Coordinates: 39°44.01′N 104°59.6′W

The Pet Sounds Recording Studio (usually referred to as simply Pet Sounds Studio or Pet Sounds, after the Beach Boys' album of the same name, often credited as the Elephant 6 Recording Company) was a recording studio located in Denver, Colorado (subsequently in Lexington, Kentucky), founded by Robert Schneider of the Apples in Stereo and Jim McIntyre of Von Hemmling. Many Elephant 6 albums were recorded in the studio, including the critically acclaimed In the Aeroplane Over the Sea by Neutral Milk Hotel. It was demolished in 1999; a high-rise condominium was subsequently erected on the site.

== History ==
Robert Schneider, one of the founders of The Elephant 6 Recording Co., began producing music for various Elephant 6 bands (including his own) in the mid-1990s. A number of these earlier recording sessions occurred at Schneider's friend Kyle Jones's house in Denver, Colorado. Jones referred to the studio as the "Sleeping Brotherhood" while Schneider called it "Pet Sounds". It is also referred to as The Elephant 6 Recording Co. in the liner notes for albums such as the Apples in Stereo's Hypnotic Suggestion EP. (The Elephant 6 Recording Company would also briefly exist as a functional record label before simply referring to the collective of like-minded musicians.)

The first official incarnation of Pet Sounds Studio was created around 1997 after Schneider moved his recording equipment from Jones's residence to friend and ex-Apples member Jim McIntyre's residence at 1170 Elati Street. The studio in the house was decorated with detailed murals painted by Steve Keene, originally for the Apples music video for "Tidal Wave". Recordings made in this studio include sessions for Neutral Milk Hotel's In the Aeroplane Over the Sea, Olivia Tremor Control's Dusk at Cubist Castle and Black Foliage, the Minders' Hooray for Tuesday, the Apples in stereo's Tone Soul Evolution, Her Wallpaper Reverie, The Discovery of a World Inside the Moone and Velocity of Sound, as well as early singles for McIntyre's solo project Von Hemmling and many other albums from the Elephant 6 collective and the 1990s indie scene.

== Other Pet Sounds Studio ==
Another Pet Sounds Studio existed in south London during the 1980s.
