= Midget and Hairs =

- Origin: Ruston, Louisiana. U.S.
- Genres: Experimental pop
- Years active: 1996--Present
- Labels: Royal Rhino Flying Records
- Members: Robert Schneider, Hilarie Sidney, Nivek Holtman, Amber Willey, Will Cullen Hart, Laura H., Jeff Mangum, Andy Gonzales, Joel R.
- Website: Midget and Hairs on MySpace

Midget and Hairs is an American experimental pop recording project of Paige Dearman, a musician associated with the Elephant Six Collective.

Dearman was born in Monroe, Louisiana, and later was introduced to members of the Elephant Six Collective in Ruston, Louisiana. Dearman first began recording under the Midget and Hairs moniker in 1996, with the release of a 7-inch titled “Cactus Screwballs.” The release featured Jeff Mangum, Hilarie Sidney, and Robert Schneider, who produced it. Dearman would continue to work with Mangum on recordings, and later collaborated with Andy Gonzales of the Marshmallow Coast on a 7-inch titled “I’m a Big Kid Now” after the two moved to Seattle. Various live performances saw the project open up for artists including The Apples in Stereo, The Softies and Elliott Smith.

Dearman moved to Austin, Texas, where she began working as a psychiatric nurse’s assistant. In 2007, the label Royal Rhino Flying Records released a compendium of new and previously released material, titled Midget and Hairs. It was Dearman’s first full-length release. She is also a painter.

== Discography ==
=== Singles ===
- "Cactus Screwballs" 7-inch on Den Mother Records (1996)
- "I’m a Big Kid Now" 7-inch on Fuzzy Aloof Records (1996)

=== Compilation appearances ===
- Songs for a Crimson Eggtree (Earworm Records)
- A Stupid Tiny Compilation (Stupid Records)

=== Albums ===
Midget and Hairs (2007)
