= Science Faire =

Compilation album by The Apples in Stereo
- Released: 1996
- Genre: Indie pop
- Length: 38:45
- Label: spinART Records (spart 48), Elephant 6 (E6 007)

The Apples in Stereo chronology
Fun Trick Noisemaker (1995)	Science Faire (1996)	Tone Soul Evolution (1997)

Professional ratings
Review scores
Source	Rating
Allmusic	link
Pitchfork Media	7.7/10 link

Science Faire is a compilation album by indie pop Elephant 6 group The Apples in Stereo. The album consists of two EPs and various singles that were released from 1993 to 1995, leading up to the production of Fun Trick Noisemaker. All of the selections were recorded the summers of 1993 and 1994 and appear on the compilation in the order they were recorded.

Robert Schneider, front man of The Apples in Stereo, has said that the song "Too Much Now" will be included on a future re-release of Science Faire. The song was the first by the band ever to be released, included on the 1993 cassette compilation The Horizon Center. Chris Parfitt, who wrote the song, sings lead vocals on the track. It was omitted from the original Science Faire pressing because of issues the band had with its production quality.

== Track listing ==
All tracks written by Robert Schneider except where noted.

1. "Tidal Wave" (R. Schneider/Chris Parfitt) – 2:57
2. "Motorcar" – 3:39
3. "Turncoat Indian" – 2:26
4. "Haley" – 3:50
5. "Not the Same" (R. Schneider/C. Parfitt) – 2:54
6. "Stop Along the Way" (Jim McIntyre/R. Schneider) – 2:46
7. "Running in Circles" – 2:29
8. "Hypnotic Suggestion" – 2:09
9. "Touch the Water" (J. McIntyre) – 2:10
10. "Glowworm" – 2:42
11. "To Love the Vibration of the Bulb" (J. McIntyre) – 2:20
12. "Time for Bed/I Know You'll Do Well" – 5:14
13. "Rocket Pad" – 3:09
- "Side One" (tracks 1–6) were originally released in 1993 on the Tidal Wave 7".
- Tracks 7–10 on "Side Two" were originally released as the Hypnotic Suggestion EP in 1994.
- Track 11 on "Side Two" was previously unreleased.
- Track 12 on "Side Two" was originally released on a 7" split EP with The Olivia Tremor Control in 1994.
- Track 13 on "Side Two" was originally released on a flexi-disc split with the Heartworms.
- The songs "Tidal Wave" and "Glowworm" would appear on the band's 1995 debut LP, Fun Trick Noisemaker.
- The opening guitar riff of "Running in Circles" is the same opening riff for "High Tide" (which appears as the third track on Fun Trick Noisemaker).

== Personnel ==
- Hilarie Sidney – drums, vocals, acoustic guitar
- Robert Schneider – electric and acoustic guitars, vocals, Casio keyboards
- Jim McIntyre – bass guitar, vocals
- Chris Parfitt – electric guitars on "Side One"
- John Hill – guitar on tracks 11–13.
- William Cullen Hart – Artwork for the compilation.
