= Tidal Wave (EP) =

Tidal Wave 7"

EP by The Apples
- Released: June 1993
- Recorded: February–April 1993
- Genre: Garage rock
- Length: 18:32
- Label: Elephant 6 (E6 001)
- Producer: Robert Schneider

The Apples chronology
Tidal Wave 7" (1993)	Hypnotic Suggestion EP (1994)

Side Two of Tidal Wave on green vinyl.

Tidal Wave 7" is the debut release by the Apples (later known as the Apples in Stereo). The EP, released in 1993, was the first official release under the Elephant 6 Recording Co. label.

The EP's six tracks were later re-released on 1996 compilation album Science Faire, after the release of the band's debut full-length LP Fun Trick Noisemaker.

800 copies of the album were pressed; 500 on green vinyl, 300 on black. 50 of the green vinyl copies were released with full color xerox covers.

The band's earliest material, it is also the most roughly recorded, produced on four-track cassette by Apples band-leader Robert Schneider. The first Elephant 6 Recording Co. catalog (Summer 1993) lists the EP as, "Dense, chiming classic pop. Layered with guitars and soaked in fuzz...." Guitarist Chris Parfitt would later describe it as "quirky lo-fi pop... with big fuzz/noise guitar atop."

== Track listing ==
All tracks written by Robert Schneider except where noted.

Side One

No.	Title	Writer(s)	Length
1.	"Tidal Wave"	Robert Schneider, Chris Parfitt	2:32
2.	"Motorcar"		3:37
3.	"Turncoat Indian"		2:22

Side Two

No.	Title	Writer(s)	Length
1.	"Haley"		3:47
2.	"Not The Same"	Schneider, Parfitt	2:52
3.	"Stop Along The Way"	Schneider, Jim McIntyre	2:40
Total length:			18:32

== Personnel ==
=== Performance ===
- Chris Parfitt – lead and rhythm guitar, backing vocals
- Jim McIntyre – bass guitar
- Hilarie Sidney – drums
- Robert Schneider – electric and acoustic guitars, vocals, keyboards, melodica
- W. Cullen Hart – backing vocals

=== Production ===
Tidal Wave 7" was produced by Robert Schneider, recorded from December 1992 to April 1993 on a 4-track. "Haley" was culled from boombox practice tapes and overdubs. Art for the album's 12-page booklet, stickers and poster was created by Will Cullen Hart. The album was mastered at Aardvark Records in Denver, Colorado with the aid of Paul Brekus.
