= John Ferguson (musician) =

American musician

- Born: John Roger Ferguson; October 20, 1978 (age 47)

John Roger Ferguson (born October 20, 1978) is an American musician. He is currently a member of The Apples in Stereo, and he was a founding member of the band Big Fresh. His father, Roger Ferguson, was an associate of underground DIY figure R. Stevie Moore, and John appeared on Moore's recordings and radio shows by age three. During his freshman year of college in Lexington, Kentucky, Ferguson teamed up with Ben Fulton and Bryan Gore to form Big Fresh in 1998. The band – with various lineup changes – recorded three albums. Throughout college, Ferguson also wrote and recorded a few solo albums at home. In 2002, Ferguson met Robert Schneider of The Apples in Stereo, and they formed Ulysses. Their first release, 010, appeared in 2004 on the Eenie Meenie Records label, and received positive reviews. In 2006, Schneider invited him to become a member of The Apples In Stereo, and Ferguson performed on the band's 2007 album, New Magnetic Wonder. Ferguson is also a member of the synth-folk band Deek hoi, and he continues to collaborate with R. Stevie Moore and perform with Big Fresh. In 2015, he and Robert Schneider created a new band called Spaceflyte which is an experimental pop band.

== Discography ==
=== With Big Fresh ===
- We Come From Outer Space (Big Fresh Music, 1998)
- Who Are the Believers? (Aquapop, 1999)
- Yes, Nice, Please, Thanks (Aquapop, 2000)
- BFF (Big Fresh Forever) (Garden Gate Records, 2008)

=== With Ulysses ===
- 010 (Eenie Meenie Records 26 October 2004)

=== With The Apples in Stereo ===
- New Magnetic Wonder (Simian Records/Elephant 6/Yep Roc 6 February 2007)
- Travellers in Space and Time (Simian Records/Elephant 6/Yep Roc 20 April 2010)

=== Solo releases ===
- The Best is Yet to Be (Big Fresh Music, 1998)
- All Mistakes, No Apologies (Big Fresh Music, 1999)
- Weekends (Big Fresh Music, 1999)
- Droppin' Outta College (Aquapop, 2000)
- My R. Stevie EP

=== Spaceflyte ===
- Visions of Pluto
