= Secret Square (album) =

Studio album by Secret Square
- Released: 1995
- Genre: Indie pop
- Length: 32:06
- Label: The Elephant 6 Recording Co.
- Producer: Hilarie Sidney

Alternative cover

Professional ratings
Review scores
Source	Rating
Allmusic	1.5/5 stars

Secret Square is an album by Secret Square. A lo-fi album with songs written by Hilarie Sidney and Lisa Janssen, it consists of seven original songs and four demos. The release went largely unnoticed. Sidney herself states "not a lot of people have" heard it. The album and the previously released single remain cult collector's items among Elephant 6 fans. Jim McIntyre of Von Hemmling provides bass for "Light of the Sun".

== Track listing ==
1. "I Love J.S." (L. Janssen) – 2:13
2. "I've Been Watching" (H. Sidney) – 2:57
3. "Plunky" (L. Janssen, H. Sidney) – 4:26
4. "We Know" (L. Janssen) – 2:33
5. "Sparkly Green Couch" (H. Sidney) – 2:31
6. "Sad Endings" (L. Janssen) – 2:27
7. "Means of Escape" (L. Janssen) – 3:53
8. "Candy Says" (L. Reed) – 3:33
9. "Relative" (L. Janssen) – 2:57
10. "Light of the Sun" (H. Sidney) – 1:34
11. "Aerodynamic (glendora mix)" (H. Sidney) – 3:02
