= Man You Gotta Get Up =

Single by The Apples in Stereo
- Released: 1998
- Genre: Indie pop
- Label: Elephant 6 spinART; Sire Records (PRO 74716-7)
- Songwriter(s): Robert Schneider
- Producer(s): Robert Schneider

The Apples in Stereo singles chronology
"The Olivia Tremor Control/The Apples in Stereo" (1994)	"Man You Gotta Get Up" (1998)	"Everybody Let Up" (2000)

Back cover

"Man You Gotta Get Up" is a 1998 single by The Apples in Stereo. Released as a 7" included with the vinyl edition of the band's 1997 album Tone Soul Evolution, the two sides of the record are labelled "side three" and "side four", suggesting that Tone Soul Evolution contains sides one and two.

Both songs from the single were later released on the 2008 b-sides and rarities compilation Electronic Projects for Musicians.

== Track listing ==
Side Three

1. "Man You Gotta Get Up" – 2:57

Side Four

1. "The Golden Flower" – 3:11
