= Stephen, Stephen =

Song by The Apples in Stereo
- Released: 2006
- Genre: Pop
- Length: 1:50
- Label: Elephant 6
- Songwriter: Robert Schneider
- Producer: Robert Schneider

"Stephen, Stephen" is a song by American rock band, The Apples in Stereo. The song made its debut on December 20, 2006 on the Comedy Central program The Colbert Report where it was performed by Apples frontman, Robert Schneider during Episode number 193.

The song glorifies the host of The Colbert Report, Stephen Colbert. In the opening lyrics of the song, Schneider sings "who's the television host/understands what matters most" to which the answer is constantly the "handsome" and "dashing" Stephen. Schneider also makes reference to Colbert's grudge against The Decemberists (whose guitarist, Chris Funk, appeared in the same episode of the show) with the lines "he's calling out the bears in their evil lairs/he's calling out the press in their fancy dress/he's calling out The Decemberists and their Green Screen Contest".

Soon after the show aired, a studio version of the song was made available for download on the band's MySpace page.

It was included on the B-sides and rarities collection Electronic Projects for Musicians in 2008.

The song was also covered by R. Stevie Moore.
