= Live in Chicago =

Live in Chicago may refer to:

== Albums ==
- Live in Chicago (The Apples in Stereo album)
- Live! in Chicago, an album by Kenny Wayne Shepherd
- Live in Chicago (King Crimson album)
- Live in Chicago (Kurt Elling album)
- Live in Chicago (Luther Allison album)
- ...Live in Chicago, an album by Panic at the Disco
- Live in Chicago (Ween album), a live album by Ween
- Live in Chicago 12.19.98, a live album by the Dave Matthews Band
- Live in Chicago, 1999, an album by Joan of Arc
- Just Jug, a 1961 Gene Ammons album later released as Live in Chicago
- Live in Chicago '23, a 2023 live album by King Gizzard & the Lizard Wizard

== EPs ==
- Live in Chicago (EP), a live EP by Trey Anastasio

== Videos ==
- Live in Chicago (Jeff Buckley video), a live DVD by Jeff Buckley
- Live in Chicago (Stevie Nicks video), a live DVD by Stevie Nicks
