= New Magnetic Wonder =

Studio album by the Apples in Stereo
- Released: February 6, 2007
- Recorded: Trout Studios, Brooklyn, New York; Lexington, Kentucky; Denver, Colorado; Benton, Kentucky
- Genres: Indie pop, neo-psychedelia
- Length: 52:24
- Labels: Simian; Elephant 6; Yep Roc (YEP 2132)
- Producers: Bryce Goggin, Robert Schneider

The Apples in Stereo chronology
Velocity of Sound (2002)	New Magnetic Wonder (2007)	Electronic Projects for Musicians (2007)

New Magnetic Wonder is the sixth studio album from the Apples in Stereo. The album was produced by Robert Schneider with additional production and mixing by Bryce Goggin (Pavement, Evan Dando, Sean Lennon) and was recorded in four separate states (New York, Colorado, Kentucky and Georgia). The album was released on February 6, 2007 via a co-venture between the actor Elijah Wood's Simian Records, Yep Roc Records and Elephant 6.

In an interview, Robert Schneider has described New Magnetic Wonder as an album with sensibilities between the Apples in Stereo albums Fun Trick Noisemaker and The Discovery of a World Inside the Moone, as well as a heavy influence from 1970s bands such as Electric Light Orchestra and Queen. Schneider has also admitted Smile by Brian Wilson as an early influence on the album.

== Background ==
=== Tour ===
In early 2005, Schneider performed "Skyway" during his Marbles tour. The Apples in Stereo also performed new songs such as "Open Eyes", "Play Tough", "Can You Feel It?" and "Energy" while on the New Magnetic Wonder 2006 pre-release tour.

Initially, the tour lineup featured lead singer and guitarist Robert Schneider, bassist Eric Allen, guitarist John Hill and drummer Hilarie Sidney as well as the addition of Elephant 6 co-founder Bill Doss on keyboards. On August 12, 2006, during Athens Popfest, it was announced that longtime drummer Hilarie Sidney was leaving the band. On October 30, 2006, John Dufilho was announced as the band's new drummer. John Ferguson also joined the tour lineup to perform additional keyboards and vocals.

=== New label ===
It was announced on September 19, 2006 that the Apples in Stereo have been signed to Simian Records, a new record label formed by Elijah Wood. Wood, a dedicated Apples fan, met Robert Schneider at SXSW music festival in Austin, Texas during 2003. New Magnetic Wonder was the first release on the newly formed label, co-released, marketed and distributed through Yep Roc Records, Elephant 6 and Redeye Distribution, as well as the first album by the Apples in Stereo not released through spinART Records

== Reception ==
Professional ratings
Aggregate scores
Source	Rating
Metacritic	78/100
Review scores
Source	Rating
AllMusic	4/5 stars
The A.V. Club	B+
Pitchfork Media	6.9/10
PopMatters	8/10 stars
Robert Christgau	A
Rolling Stone	4/5 stars

New Magnetic Wonder has received positive reviews, and has been described in the press as a "masterpiece". On review aggregate site Metacritic, the album has a 78 out of 100, indicating "Generally favorable reviews".

This album was #28 on Rolling Stone's list of the Top 50 Albums of 2007.

== Track listing ==
New Magnetic Wonder consists of 14 songs and 10 musical segues ("link tracks").

All tracks written by Robert Schneider except where noted.

Disc 1: NB-39

1. "Can You Feel It?" (co-written by Bill Doss) – 4:10
2. "Skyway" – 2:40
3. "Mellotron 1" – 0:33
4. "Energy" – 3:30
5. "Same Old Drag" – 3:25
6. "Joanie Don't U Worry" – 0:46
7. "Sunndal Song" (Hilarie Sidney) – 3:31
8. "Droplet" – 0:13
9. "Play Tough" – 3:27
10. "Sun is Out" – 2:29
11. "Non-Pythagorean Composition 1" – 0:30
12. "Hello Lola" – 0:15
13. "7 Stars" – 3:46
14. "Mellotron 2" – 0:41

Disc 2: DT-13

1. "Sunday Sounds" (Sidney) – 2:59
2. "Open Eyes" – 5:12
3. "Crimson" – 0:17
4. "Pre-Crimson" (Eric Allen) – 1:24
5. "Vocoder Ba Ba" – 0:14
6. "Radiation" – 3:14
7. "Beautiful Machine Parts 1–2" – 2:36
8. "Beautiful Machine Parts 3–4" – 4:58
9. "My Pretend" – 0:42
10. "Non-Pythagorean Composition 3" – 0:49

The song "Atom Bomb" (2:37) is featured as track 7 on disc one in the vinyl release.

== Non-Pythagorean scale ==
New Magnetic Wonder touts Schneider's invention of a new musical scale: the "Non-Pythagorean scale". The enhanced CD version of the album features descriptions of the scale as well as digital files for MIDI usage.

Two songs composed using this scale have been included on the album, with a third ("Non-Pythagorean Composition 2") as a bonus track on the enhanced CD.

== Enhanced CD content ==
The enhanced CD version of the album features the following supplemental content:

- The bonus mp3 "Non-Pythagorean Composition 2" (also known as "Alien Pop").
- Three pop collages by Andrew McLaughlin, from which the album art was derived. All three images are .jpg files.
  - "Acid Eden" (front cover artwork)
  - "Bob Dylan's Enlightenment" (gatefold artwork)
  - "Sightseeing" (liner notes artwork)
- Two short films, both .mov files.
  - Dr. Robert featuring the song "Droplet"
  - A brief demonstration of the Non-Pythagorean scale by Robert Schneider
- Lyrics and liner notes (.txt files).
- Various descriptions and explanations of the Non-Pythagorean scale, including .wav files, a SoundFont file and instructions for tuning a keyboard to the Non-Pythagorean scale.

== Personnel ==
The Apples in Stereo

- Robert Schneider – lead and backing vocals, lead and rhythm guitar, acoustic and electric piano, organ, synthesizer, Mellotron, vocoder, electronic effects, percussion, handclaps, bass guitar, non-Pythagorean music scale
- Hilarie Sidney – lead and backing vocals, drums, percussion, handclaps, rhythm guitar
- Eric Allen – bass guitar, backing vocals, echoplex, space guitar, handclaps
- John Hill – rhythm guitar, phase shift, backing vocals, handclaps

Other performers

- Anonymous studio musicians – Mellotron tape banks.
- Per Ole Bratset – lead guitar, sound effects.
- Bill Doss – backing vocals, vocal arrangement, Piano Fun, acoustic guitar, handclaps.
- John Ferguson – backing vocals.
- John Fernandes – bass clarinet, violins.
- Pete Fitzpatrick – euphonium.
- Bryce Goggin – electronic effects.
- Matthew Goodman – backing vocals.
- Will Cullen Hart – drums, backing vocals, electronic effects, handclaps, backwards poetry, plastic whistle.
- Otto Helmuth – mandolin, backing vocals, handclaps.
- Jeff Holland – lap steel, echoplex.
- London audience – anger due to Apples' overly-loud guitars.
- Jeff Mangum – drums (on "Sunndal Song" and "Sunday Sounds"), cow object, backing vocals, handclaps.
- Tony Miller – backing vocals.
- Craig Morris – lead and backwards guitar, Mellotron, fuzz bass.
- Adam Sachs – cowbell, tambourine.
- Zack Shaw – alto sax, weird toys, echoplex.

Production

New Magnetic Wonder was produced by Robert Schneider. The album was co-produced and engineered by Bryce Goggin at Trout Recording, Brooklyn, New York. Schneider and Goggin also mixed the album. It was mastered by Fred Kevorkian (Kevorkian Mastering, New York, New York). Original recording, mixing and mastering was conducted September 2005 to September 2006 in multiple studios, utilizing analog tape machines and digital computers.

Additional engineering is by:

- The Apples in Stereo (Lexington, Kentucky and Denver, Colorado)
- Adam Sachs (Brooklyn, New York)
- Craig Morris (Benton, Kentucky)
- Otto Helmuth (Lexington, Kentucky)
- Bill Doss (Athens, Georgia)
- Pete Fitzpatrick (Brooklyn, New York)
- Jas Osborne (Lexington, Kentucky)
- Jeff Holland (Boulder, Colorado)

Assistant engineering is by Ryan Shono, Alec Fellman, and Jack Schlinkert (Brooklyn, New York).

Album art collages are by Andrew McLaughlin with graphic design by Mary Gunn.
