= Live in Chicago (The Apples in Stereo album) =

Live album by The Apples in Stereo
- Released: 2001 (Emusic only)
- Recorded: April 26, 2000
- Genre: Indie pop
- Label: SpinART
- Producer: Robert Schneider

Professional ratings
Review scores
Source	Rating
Allmusic	link
Pitchfork Media	7.6/10 link

Live in Chicago is a live album by The Apples in Stereo that was released exclusively as an online MP3 download from Emusic in 2001. The album was recorded at Schubas Tavern, Chicago, Illinois on April 26, 2000.

Though the album is no longer available, the cover song "Heroes and Villains" can be found on the 2001 EP Let's Go!

== Track listing ==
All tracks are written by Robert Schneider except where noted.

1. "I Can't Believe"
2. "Ruby"
3. "Go!"
4. "Seems So"
5. "What's the #"
6. "Heroes and Villains" (Brian Wilson, Van Dyke Parks)
7. "Get There Fine"
8. "Show the World"
9. "Dots 1, 2, 3" (J. McIntyre, R. Schneider)
