= Hypnotic Suggestion =

Hypnotic Suggestion EP

EP by The Apples in Stereo
- Released: 1994
- Recorded: December 1993–February 1994
- Genre: Indie rock
- Length: 9:30
- Label: Elephant 6 Bus Stop (BUS 044)
- Producer: Robert Schneider

The Apples in Stereo chronology
Tidal Wave 7" (1993)	Hypnotic Suggestion EP (1994)	Fun Trick Noisemaker (1995)

Hypnotic Suggestion EP is the second EP by The Apples in Stereo. The record was released in 1994.

The EP's four tracks were later re-released on 1996 compilation album Science Faire, after the release of the band's debut full-length LP Fun Trick Noisemaker.

== Track listing ==
All tracks written by Robert Schneider except where noted.

Side One

No.	Title	Length
1.	"Running In Circles"	2:29
2.	"Hypnotic Suggestion"	2:09

Side Two

No.	Title	Writer(s)	Length
1.	"Touch The Water"	Jim McIntyre	2:10
2.	"Glowworm"		2:42
Total length:			9:30

== Personnel ==
=== The Apples in Stereo ===
- Hilarie Sidney – drums, acoustic guitar, backing vocals
- Jim McIntyre – electric bass, lead vocals on "Touch the Water"
- Robert Schneider – lead vocals, acoustic and electric guitars, keyboards

=== Additional performers ===
- John Hill – chorus member

=== Production ===
Hypnotic Suggestion was produced by Robert Schneider and recorded from December 1993 to February 1994 on four-track tape machines at The Elephant 6 Recording Co. The album was mastered by Paul Brekus, Aardvark Records, Denver, Colorado. All art for the album was created by Will Cullen Hart.
