= Secret Square =

- Years active: 1995
- Label: Elephant 6
- Spinoff of: The Apples in Stereo
- Past members: Hilarie Sidney; Lisa Janssen

Secret Square was an early, now-defunct side project of The Apples in Stereo drummer and vocalist Hilarie Sidney and Lisa Janssen, who played bass on the Neutral Milk Hotel album On Avery Island. They had two 1995 releases, both self-titled, under the Elephant Six banner.

== Discography ==
- Secret Square (7" vinyl single) (1995)
- Secret Square (LP) (1995)
