= The Olivia Tremor Control/The Apples in Stereo =

The Olivia Tremor Control/ The Apples in Stereo

EP by the Olivia Tremor Control and the Apples in Stereo
- Released: 1994
- Genre: Indie rock, indie pop
- Length: 11:04
- Label: Small Fi (small-fi 4), No Life

The Olivia Tremor Control singles chronology
California Demise (1994)	The Olivia Tremor Control/ The Apples in Stereo (1994)	The Giant Day (1996)

The Apples in Stereo singles chronology
The Olivia Tremor Control/The Apples in Stereo (1994)	Man You Gotta Get Up (1998)

The Olivia Tremor Control/The Apples in Stereo is a 1994 split single by the two Elephant 6 bands.

The two tracks by the Apples in Stereo would appear on the Science Faire compilation in 1996 while the two tracks by the Olivia Tremor Control were later collected and placed on the Singles and Beyond compilation in 2000.

== Track listing ==
The Olivia Tremor Control Side
No.	Title	Length
1.	"Gypsum Oil Field Fire"	3:40
2.	"King of the Claws"	2:10
Total length:		5:50

The Apples in Stereo Side
No.	Title	Length
1.	"Time for Bed"	3:38
2.	"I Know You'll Do Well"	1:36
Total length:		5:14
