= Let's Go! (EP) =

Let's Go

EP by The Apples in Stereo
- Released: July 17, 2001
- Genre: Indie rock, indie pop, garage rock
- Length: 14:26
- Label: SpinART Records (spart 95); Elephant 6
- Producer: Robert Schneider

The Apples in Stereo chronology
| The Discovery of a World Inside the Moone (2000) | Let's Go (2001) | Sound Effects (2001) |

Professional ratings
Review scores
| Source | Rating |
|---|---|
| Allmusic | 3/5 stars |
| Pitchfork Media | 3.8/10 |
| Robert Christgau | (1-star Honorable Mention) |

Let's Go! is a 2001 EP by The Apples in Stereo. It contains five songs.

The artwork for the cover of the EP was illustrated by Craig McCracken, creator of The Powerpuff Girls.

== Track listing ==
All tracks are written by Robert Schneider except for track 3, written by Brian Wilson and Van Dyke Parks.

1. "Signal in the Sky (Let's Go)" – 2:58 - This song is from the album Heroes & Villains, a soundtrack to the animated television series The Powerpuff Girls. It is featured in a Season 4 episode of the series, "Superfriends".
2. "If You Want to Wear a Hat" – 2:11 - This is the only original song to be found on the album, as the other four songs are originally found on other albums or are demo versions, etc.
3. "Heroes & Villains" – 3:44 - This track is a cover song of "Heroes and Villains" by The Beach Boys. The song was recorded live at Schubas Tavern in Chicago, Illinois, on March 26, 2000.
4. "Stream Running Over" – 2:25 - This track is an acoustic version of the song of the same name originally found on the Apples in Stereo album The Discovery of a World Inside the Moone. It is recorded with only vocals and acoustic guitar.
5. "Signal in the Sky (Let's Go)" – 3:08 - This track is the original demo version of the first track.

== Personnel ==
- Robert Schneider - guitar, lead vocals
- Eric Allen - bass
- John Hill - guitar
- Chris McDuffie - keyboards
- Hilarie Sidney - drums
