= Heloise and the Savoir Faire =

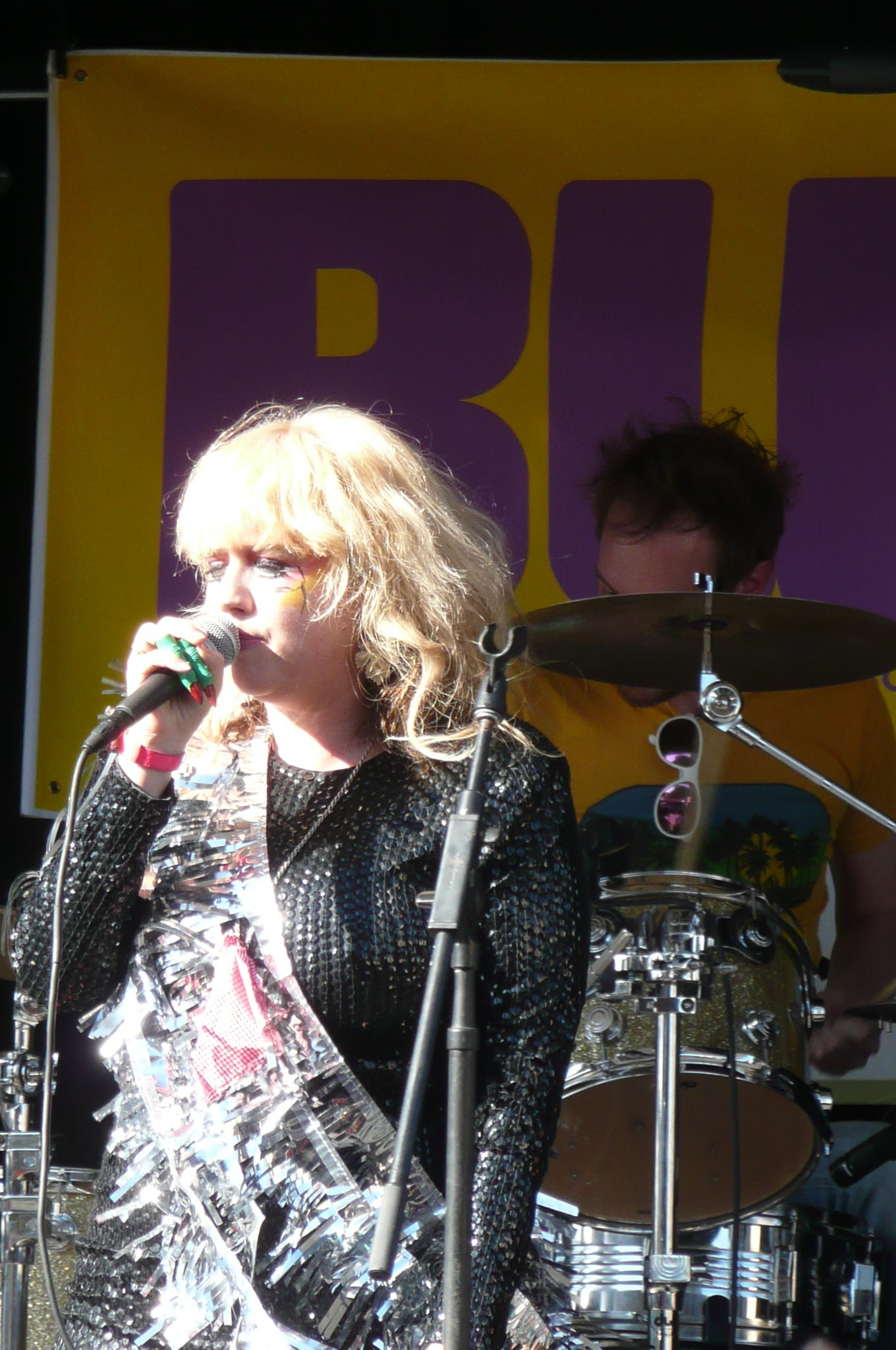

Background information
- Origin: Brooklyn, New York, United States
- Genres: Indie pop, piano rock, pop, electropop
- Years active: 2004-present
- Labels: Yep Roc
- Members: Heloise Williams; James Bellizia; Rob O'Dea; Luke Hughett; Joe Shepard
- Past members: Jason Cooley; Sara Sweet Rabidoux; Jason Diamond
- Website: HeloiseMusic.com

Heloise and the Savoir Faire are an American punk outfit based in Brooklyn, New York, United States. Fronted by Heloise Williams (ex-viperHouse songwriter, and lead vocalist), the band's live lineup was originally composed of Williams singing over a pre-recorded track and was accompanied by the dance stylings of Joe "Juge" Shepard and Sara Sweet Rabidoux. In the summer of 2004, Heloise began experimenting with a backup band on a few songs. The original three band members were James Bellizia (stunt guitar, member of Pooloop and Sweet Ass Pussy), Jason Cooley (bass, member of Burlington-based Led Loco and James Kochalka Superstar) and Luke Hughett (drums, x Qatsi and the Shipwreckers). The current lineup features Rob O'Dea on bass and electronics. Guest performers have included Pamela Jintana Racine of Gogol Bordello and Tracy Murphy of Opti-Grab

== Collaborations ==
Heloise has collaborated with members of the Art Ensemble of Chicago and Phish. She was also electro-starlet Peaches' bodyguard/driver on her tour of the US with rockers Queens of the Stone Age. Deborah Harry also provides vocals on some of the tracks featured on their album.

== Record label signing ==
The band have signed with Elijah Wood's Simian Records, an imprint of Yep Roc Records.

== Debut album ==
Their first LP Trash, Rats & Microphones was released in the U.S. on April 29, 2008 and in the U.K. in June 2008. The band performed on The Friday Night Project on 11 April 2008 when Elijah Wood was guest-hosting.

== Discography ==
=== Albums ===
- Trash, Rats and Microphones, 2008
- Diamond Dust, 2013
