= Tone Soul Evolution =

Studio album by The Apples in Stereo
- Released: September 30, 1997
- Recorded: February – June 1997 @ Studio.45, Hartford, Connecticut, and Pet Sounds Studio, Denver, Colorado
- Genre: Indie pop, indie rock, psychedelic pop, power pop
- Length: 39:42
- Label: Sire (31013); spinART; Elephant 6
- Producer: Robert Schneider

The Apples in Stereo chronology
Science Faire (1996)	Tone Soul Evolution (1997)	Her Wallpaper Reverie (1999)

Professional ratings
Review scores
Source	Rating
AllMusic	4/5 stars
The A.V. Club	(favorable)
Robert Christgau	A−
Rolling Stone	3/5 stars
Uncut	5/5 stars

Tone Soul Evolution is the second album from The Apples in Stereo. It was recorded from February to June and released in September 1997.

The vinyl edition of the album was released with a bonus 7" that included the songs "Man You Gotta Get Up" and "The Golden Flower".

== Track listing ==
All tracks written by Robert Schneider except where noted.

1. "Seems So" – 3:20
2. "What's the #?" – 2:58
3. "About Your Fame" – 2:16
4. "Shine a Light" – 3:23
5. "Silver Chain" (H. Sidney) – 4:01
6. "Get There Fine" – 3:15
7. "The Silvery Light of a Dream" – 2:00
8. "The Silvery Light of a Dream (Part II)" – 3:09
9. "We'll Come to Be" – 3:29
10. "Tin Pan Alley" – 2:19
11. "You Said That Last Night" – 2:33
12. "Try to Remember" – 3:11
13. "Find Our Way" – 2:27
14. "Coda" – 1:13

=== Bonus track listing ===
1. "Man You Gotta Get Up" – 3:07
2. "The Golden Flower" – 3:10

== "Dreams" ==
Several tracks were recorded during the Tone Soul Evolution sessions, though some were left unfinished and were ultimately dropped from the album. In particular, a 24-track mix of "Dreams" was nearly finished for the album, save for some synthesizer elements and a guitar solo. Lead guitarist Robert Schneider had various attempts at recording the solo, later describing it as "the best guitar solo I've ever played in my life—I swear to God." However, he was having difficulty finding the right "soaring" tone for the solo and the band was running short on studio time. The song, a favorite of the band's at the time, was set aside with the intention of including it on a subsequent album, though it never materialized.

In 2005, during the production of Schneider's Marbles album, Expo, Mark Linett transferred the song to Pro Tools and Schneider remixed it, adding synth tracks. It was finally released for the first time in 2008 on the b-sides and rarities compilation, Electronic Projects for Musicians.

== Personnel ==
=== The Apples in Stereo ===
- John Hill - rhythm and acoustic guitars, backing vocals, handclaps
- Eric Allen - electric bass, backing vocals, handclaps
- Hilarie Sidney - drums, lead and backing vocals, maraca, sleigh bells, handclaps, tambourine
- Robert Schneider - lead, rhythm and acoustic guitars, lead and backing vocals, pianos, organs, melodica, ukulele, additional percussion, sound collage art

=== Additional players ===
- Rick Benjamin - first trombone, horn section conductor
- Merisa Bissinger - alto saxophone, trumpet, piccolo
- Jon Hegel - tenor saxophone
- Kyle Jones - acoustic piano
- Michael Deming - backing vocals, tambourine, handclaps
- Dane Terry - personal liberation
- Zoe Blythe - handclaps
- Thom Monaham - backing vocals, handclaps, lending of his eight-track recorder

=== Production ===
Tone Soul Evolution was produced by Robert Schneider. It was engineered by Michael Deming, Jim McIntyre and The Apples in Stereo. The album was mixed by Robert Schneider and Michael Deming. Twenty-four-track analog recording, eight-track transfers and mixing engineered by Michael Deming at Studio.45 (Hartford, Connecticut), with assistance from David Shuman, and The Apples in Stereo. Eight-channel recording and superimposition engineered by Robert Schneider and Jim McIntyre at Pet Sounds Recording Studio (Denver, Colorado).

Album art was done by Steve Keene (one piece inspired by Jasper Francis Cropsey and the other by Piet Mondrian). Starling Keene is responsible for the lettering.
