= Live in Chicago (Stevie Nicks video) =

Video by Stevie Nicks
- Released: March 31, 2009
- Recorded: Grainger Studios (September 2007)
- Genre: Rock, pop
- Length: 120:00
- Label: Reprise
- Director: Joe Thomas
- Producer: Joe Thomas, PBS

Stevie Nicks chronology
Crystal Visions – The Very Best of Stevie Nicks: Disc Two (DVD) (2007)	Live in Chicago (2009)

Live in Chicago is a DVD by the American singer-songwriter and Fleetwood Mac vocalist Stevie Nicks. It was filmed for PBS's Soundstage, on September 25, 2007 at Grainger Studios in Chicago, Illinois and the episode aired on television in July 2008. Its release is also accompanied with the live album, The Soundstage Sessions. The DVD is available in standard and Blu-ray editions. The DVD is certified gold in Australia.

== Track listing ==
1. "Stand Back"
2. "Enchanted"
3. "If Anyone Falls"
4. "Rhiannon"
5. "Crash into Me" (Dave Matthews Band cover)
6. "Dreams"
7. "Sorcerer"
8. "The One" (duet with Vanessa Carlton)
9. "Gold Dust Woman"
10. "I Need to Know" (Tom Petty and the Heartbreakers cover)
11. "Circle Dance" (duet with Vanessa Carlton)
12. "Landslide"
13. "Sara"
14. "Fall from Grace"
15. "How Still My Love"
16. "Edge of Seventeen"
17. "Rock and Roll" (Led Zeppelin cover)
18. "Landslide" (Orchestral Version) (bonus track)

== Personnel ==
Main Performers

- Stevie Nicks – vocals, producer
- Vanessa Carlton – guest performer
- Sharon Celani – backup vocals
- Lori Nicks – backup vocals
- Jana Anderson – backup vocals

Production

- Joe Thomas – producer
- Waddy Wachtel – producer
- Frank Pappalardo – engineering
- Michael Czaszwicz – Recording engineering
- Patrick DeWitte – assistant engineering
- Mixed at HD Ready, St. Charles

Musicians

- Waddy Wachtel – musical director/guitar
- Lenny Castro – percussion
- Al Ortiz – bass
- Jimmy Paxson – drums
- Ricky Peterson – keyboards
- Carlos Rios – guitar
- Darrell Smith – keyboards

Orchestra

- Eric Roth – conductor
- Janice MacDonald – flute
- Deb Stevenson – oboe
- Greg Flint – horn
- Christine Worthing – horn
- Guillaume Combet – violin
- Jennifer Cappelli – violin
- Carmen Llop-Kassinger – violin
- Christine Keiko Abe – violin
- Carol Cook – viola
- Jocelyn Davis-Beck – cello
- Eddie Bayers – drums
- Michael Rhodes – bass
- Joe Thomas – keyboards

== Charts ==
Chart (2009)	Peak position
U.S. Billboard Top Music Video	1
Australia ARIA Charts Top 40 Music DVDs	16

== Certifications ==
Region	Certification	Certified units/sales
Australia (ARIA)	Gold	7,500^{^}
^{^} Shipments figures based on certification alone.
