= Air-Sea Dolphin =

Indie band by the creators of The Apples in Stereo and Homestar Runner

- Origin: Athens, Georgia
- Genres: Indie pop, lo-fi
- Years active: 2016–present
- Labels: Chunklet Industries; Third Uncle Records
- Members: Robert Schneider; Matt Chapman; Mike Chapman; Jamey Huggins; Ryan Steritt

Air-Sea Dolphin is a musical project by Robert Schneider of The Apples in Stereo, James Husband (James Huggins from of Montreal and Elf Power), Ryan Sterritt and The Brothers Chaps. The group was started after Robert Schneider joined the Homestar Runner live band in 2016 as a new songwriting vehicle for his song ideas with the creative input of the Brothers Chaps & Co. to form a new group focused on 90s lo-fi 4-track recording with the addition of 8-bit style retro "video games" designed to accompany their music.

They have released a 7" split single with label-mate Honey Radar and a split EP with sloshy, a parody band which lampoons indie rock tropes. Their EP, simply titled "Air-Sea Dolphin / Sloshy Split", was released alongside a video game programmed in Scratch, with the assistance of Schneider's son Max.

== Discography ==
=== Singles ===
- "Exploding / Spillman Was a Motorhead" (2017) 7" split single with Honey Radar
- "Air-Sea Dolphin / Sloshy Split" (2018) 7" split EP with sloshy
