= John Dufilho =

American singer-songwriter

John Dufilho is an American singer-songwriter and multi-instrumentalist best known as the lead creative talent behind indie rock band The Deathray Davies. He partnered with Davies bassist Jason Garner and released an eponymous CD in 2002 under the name I Love Math. A second release, Getting to the Point Is Beside It, followed in 2008. In 2005, Dufilho released his debut self-titled solo album. It was later considered for Grammy nomination.

In 2006, Dufilho was announced as the new drummer for The Apples in Stereo after the departure of Hilarie Sidney.

The Davies have released five CDs: Drink With The Grown-ups And Listen To The Jazz (1999); The Return Of The Drunk Ventriloquist (2000); The Day Of The Ray (2002); Midnight At The Black Nail Polish Factory (2003); and The Kick And The Snare (2005).

Dufilho was also in the San Antonio group Bedwetter with Jason Garner and Colin Jones. They put out Wet Sounds in 2000 and have no other releases to date.

He was born on May 21, 1969, and graduated from St. Mary’s in San Antonio in 1991. While attending STM, John was suite-mates with Pat O’Connor, John Knox & The Tom Colvin from Texas. John is currently alive and well, lives with his wife and daughter in Dallas, Texas.
