= Her Wallpaper Reverie =

Studio album by The Apples in Stereo
- Released: June 8, 1999
- Genre: Indie pop, indie rock, psychedelic pop
- Length: 27:08
- Label: SpinART Records (spart 72), Elephant 6 (E6-020)
- Producer: Robert Schneider

The Apples in Stereo chronology
Tone Soul Evolution (1997)	Her Wallpaper Reverie (1999)	Look Away + 4 (2000)

Alternative cover
- Australian release.

Professional ratings
Review scores
Source	Rating
AllMusic	4.5/5 stars
NME	6/10
Pitchfork	6.3/10
PopMatters	7.3/10
Spin	8/10

Her Wallpaper Reverie is the third album from The Apples in Stereo.

The fifteen tracks listed for the album give the impression that it is about the same length as the band's previous two albums, but only seven of the tracks are "actual" songs. The other eight tracks play a variation of the same melody. These eight tracks are treated as musical interludes and are marked with Roman numerals. Most of these interludes range from ten seconds to a minute in length (with the exception of "vi. Drifting Patterns" which is over two and a half minutes long). The result length is 27 minutes.

Critical response to the album was varied. A common criticism was that the album contained too many interludes. (In fact, there are more musical interludes on the album than there are songs.) Pitchfork Media, for instance, stated that many of these interludes were "annoying" .

The psychedelic production of the album led critics to make comparisons to popular albums by The Beatles and The Beach Boys.

== Track listing ==
All tracks written by Robert Schneider except where noted.

1. "i. Her Room is a Rainy Garden (Wallpaper Reverie Theme)" – 0:11
2. "ii. Morning Breaks (and Roosters Complain)" – 0:21
3. "The Shiney Sea" – 3:40
4. "iii. The Significance of a Floral Print" – 0:37
5. "Strawberryfire" – 4:27
6. "iv. From Outside, in Floats a Music Box" – 1:00
7. "Ruby" – 3:08
8. "v. She Looks Through Empty Windows" – 0:14
9. "Questions and Answers" (Hilarie Sidney) – 2:53
10. "vi. Drifting Patterns" – 2:44
11. "Y2K" – 2:23
12. "vii. Les Amants" – 0:33
13. "Benefits of Lying (with Your Friend)" – 3:35
14. "Ruby, Tell Me" – 1:00
15. "viii. Together They Dream Into the Evening" – 0:14

=== Alternate release bonus tracks ===
The Australian and Japanese versions of Her Wallpaper Reverie contain five bonus tracks. The first four were later released on the Look Away + 4 EP.

- "Behind the Waterfall"
- "Everybody Let Up"
- "Her Pretty Face"
- "The Friar's Lament"
- "Extended Introduction"

In addition, both the Australian and Japanese editions have different color schemes for the album artwork, Japan's being blue and yellow, Australia's being orange and red. There is also an alternate UK cover that is pink and green.

== Personnel ==
=== "The Orchestra" ===
- John Hill - electric and acoustic guitars, backing vocals, handclaps, tape manipulation
- Hilarie Sidney - drums, lead and backing vocals, electric guitar, percussion
- Eric Allen - electric bass, backing vocals, tape loops, handclaps
- Chris McDuffie - organ, upright piano, synthesizer, backing vocals, percussion, clipclops, clavinet
- Robert Schneider - electric and acoustic guitars, lead and backing vocals, upright and toy pianos, synthesizer, percussion

=== "Supporting Players" ===
- Rick Benjamin - trombone
- Merisa Bissinger - saxophone
- Scott Spillane - flugelhorn
- Josh Johnson - backing vocals, handclaps
- Tammy Ealom - backing vocals, handclaps
- Jim McIntyre - backing vocals, handclaps

=== Production ===
Her Wallpaper Reverie was produced and mixed by Robert Schneider and engineered by the Apples in Stereo. Jim McIntyre acted as executive producer. The album was recorded and mixed at Pet Sounds Recording Studio, Denver, Colorado from January to March, 1999 (with the exception of "Morning Breaks" and "Benefits of Lying", which were recorded during 1997).

Artwork for the album was created by William Cullen Hart, with layout by Joel Marowitz.
