= Pop Romantique: French Pop Classics =

Pop Romantique

Compilation album
- Released: February 23, 1999
- Genre: French pop, indie pop
- Label: March Records, Emperor Norton Records

Professional ratings
Review scores
Source	Rating
Allmusic	4/5 stars

Pop Romantique: French Pop Classics is a compilation album featuring French pop songs performed by indie pop bands. Though some of the songs on the album are indeed "classic" French pop songs, many songs were written specifically for the album or songs translated into French from English. Jack "Skippy" McFadden curated the collection. It was released on February 23, 1999, on March Records, Emperor Norton.

== Track listing ==
1. "Pardon" by The Hang Ups – 3:04
2. "L'anamour" by Ivy – 2:39
3. "La Poupee Qui Fait Non" by Luna – 2:56
4. "Jeanne" by Air ft. Françoise Hardy – 4:25
5. "Avril En Mai" by The Apples in Stereo – 2:12
6. "Si Tu Dois Partir" by Lloyd Cole & His Negatives – 2:43
7. "Nous Ne Somme Pas De Anges" by Heavenly – 2:49
8. "Contact" by Godzuki – 3:57
9. "Je Suis Venu Te Dire Que Je M'en Vais" by John Wesley Harding – 5:18
10. "Zoooom!" by Sukia – 3:23
11. "Le Tourbillon" by The Magnetic Fields – 2:17
12. "Puis-Je?" by The Ladybug Transistor ft. Kevin Ayers – 3:20
