= Simian Records =

- Founded: 2005
- Founder: Elijah Wood
- Defunct: August 12, 2015
- Genre: Various
- Country of origin: U.S.

Simian Records was an American independent record label founded by actor Elijah Wood in 2005 and incorporated in the state of California on May 10, 2007. The label's first album, New Magnetic Wonder by The Apples in Stereo, was released in 2007. It was co-released and distributed through Yep Roc Records, Elephant 6 and Redeye Distribution. The corporation was dissolved on August 12, 2015. The corporation identifier was C2998232, Simian Records.

In addition to The Apples in Stereo, Simian Records also signed the band Heloise and the Savoir Faire.

== Roster ==
- The Apples in Stereo
- Heloise and the Savoir Faire
- Bryan Scary and the Shredding Tears

== See also ==
- List of record labels
