= Velocity of Sound =

Studio album by the Apples in Stereo
- Released: October 8, 2002
- Recorded: January 2–June 6, 2002 @ Pet Sounds Recording Studio, Denver, Colorado
- Genres: Noise pop; garage rock; psychedelia
- Length: 26:59
- Labels: SpinART Records (SPART100), Elephant 6
- Producer: Robert Schneider

The Apples in Stereo chronology
Sound Effects (2001)	Velocity of Sound (2002)	New Magnetic Wonder (2007)

Professional ratings
Aggregate scores
Source	Rating
Metacritic	64/100
Review scores
Source	Rating
AllMusic	3/5 stars
Blender	4/5 stars
Pitchfork	6.4/10
PopMatters	(favorable)
Robert Christgau	A−
Rolling Stone	3/5 stars

Velocity of Sound is the fifth studio album by the Apples in Stereo, released in October 2002. The United States release has an orange album cover, while the European version is green and the Japanese version is blue. The bonus track is also different for each version.

The album is somewhat louder and more aggressive than the band's four previous studio albums with more emphasis on electric instruments (such as the distorted sounds of an electric guitar) than acoustic. The album was recorded between January 2 - June 6, 2002 at Pet Sounds Recording Studio in Denver, Colorado on 8-track and 16-track tape machines as well as an electronic computer.

== Track listing ==
All tracks written by Robert Schneider except where noted.

1. "Please" – 2:29
2. "Rainfall" (lyrics by Robert Schneider, music by Hilarie Sidney) – 2:44
3. "That's Something I Do" – 2:28
4. "Do You Understand?" – 3:22
5. "Where We Meet" – 2:52
6. "Yore Days" (Eric Allen) – 2:03
7. "Better Days" – 2:29
8. "I Want" (Hilarie Sidney) – 2:03
9. "Mystery" – 3:10
10. "Baroque" – 3:21

=== Bonus tracks ===
American release

11. "She's Telling Lies (Bryce's Mix)" – 1:51

European release

11. "She's Telling Lies (Robert's Mix)" – 1:42

Japanese release

11. "Other" – 2:19

== Personnel ==
The Apples in Stereo

- Eric Allen - bass guitar, backing vocals, lead vocals on track 6
- John Hill - rhythm guitar, backing vocals
- Robert Schneider - lead and backing vocals, lead guitar, synthesizer, percussion
- Hilarie Sidney - drums, percussion, backing vocals, lead vocals on tracks 2 and 8

Additional

- Chris McDuffie - organ, backing vocals
- Dan Efram - percussion, repercussion
- Bryce Goggin - percussion

Production

- Robert Schneider - production, mixing (tracks 5, 6, 7 and 9)
- The Apples in Stereo, Jim McIntyre - engineering
- Bryce Goggin - mixing (tracks 1, 2, 3, 4, 8, 10 and 11)
- Emily Lazar - mastering
- Dan Efram - package concept and design
