= The Discovery of a World Inside the Moone =

Studio album by The Apples in Stereo
- Released: April 18, 2000
- Recorded: May 1999 – February 2000
- Studio: Pet Sounds Recording Studio
- Genre: Indie pop, indie rock
- Length: 41:04
- Label: SpinART Records (spart 83), Elephant 6
- Producer: Robert Schneider

The Apples in Stereo chronology
Look Away + 4 (2000)	The Discovery of a World Inside the Moone (2000)	Let's Go! (2001)

Professional ratings
Aggregate scores
Source	Rating
Metacritic	82/100
Review scores
Source	Rating
AllMusic	3.5/5 stars
Alternative Press	4/5 stars
Entertainment Weekly	B+
Mojo	4/5 stars
NME	7/10
Pitchfork	6.5/10
Q	4/5 stars
Tom Hull – on the Web	A−
The Village Voice	A−

The Discovery of a World Inside the Moone (2000) is the fourth album from The Apples in Stereo. It received generally good reviews as a showcase for the band's experimental/psychedelic pop.

The album is the band's first major change in production style compared to earlier albums. Up until The Discovery of a World Inside the Moone, producer and band leader Robert Schneider would usually implement a Wall of Sound style of production on his records whereas on this album he chose to pursue a rawer sound. This was to portray a sound more similar to how the band sounded during live performances versus a typically more orchestrated quality of sound. In an interview flexi disc, included on the vinyl-LP version of the album, Schneider remarks: "That was a lesson I learned from Led Zeppelin and from the Beatles—is that one guitar can go a long way. I used to take a Phil Spector approach which was that a lot of guitars can go a long way. Now I’m kind of going more for the feeling of the way we sound."

In addition to change in production style, the style of genre itself is also something of a departure from the usual 1960s psychedelic pop sound trademarked by earlier Apples in Stereo records. In songwriting, Schneider took more of an influence from R&B artists such as Sly & the Family Stone and early artists featured on the Motown label. Schneider also wanted the songs to sound more disconnected and unique to themselves than on previous albums. He stated, "I wanted every song to be self contained...on our other records we always had our songs run together. On this record we left big spaces between all the songs so you have a place to put your needle down on the record." This was influenced by records such as The White Album by the Beatles.

The title is from a book written in 1638 by English clergyman John Wilkins.

== Track listing ==
All tracks written by Robert Schneider except where noted.

=== Side one ===
1. "Go" - 3:14
2. "The Rainbow" - 2:39
3. "Stream Running Over" - 3:44
4. "20 Cases Suggestive Of..." (Hilarie Sidney) - 2:53
5. "Look Away" - 3:25
6. "What Happened Then" - 2:10

=== Side two ===
7. "I Can’t Believe" - 4:23
8. "Submarine Dream" - 4:30
9. "Allright/Not Quite" - 2:54
10. "The Bird That You Can’t See" - 3:56
11. "Stay Gold" (Hilarie Sidney) - 4:04
12. "The Afternoon" - 3:12

=== Bonus track listing ===
Bonus 7" The vinyl edition of The Discovery of a World Inside the Moone comes with a bonus 7" flexidisc with the following tracks:

- "Interview"
- "Hold on to This Day"

Japanese version The Japanese version of the album contains the following bonus tracks:

- "Hold on to This Day"
- "The Oasis"

== Personnel ==
=== The Apples in Stereo ===
- Hilarie Sidney - drums, percussion, lead and backing vocals, electric guitar
- Chris McDuffie - synthesizers, piano, organ, backing vocals, mellotron, percussion
- Eric Allen - Fender bass guitar, backing vocals
- John Hill - electric and acoustic guitars, backing vocals
- Robert Schneider - electric and acoustic guitar, piano, organ, mellotron, synthesizers, percussion, lead and backing vocals

=== Additional players ===
- Rick Benjamin - trombone
- Merisa Bissinger - flute, piccolo, alto saxophone
- Jon Hegel - tenor saxophone
- Rob Greene - cello
- Dane Terry - bongos
- Ron Marschall - handclaps, backing vocals

=== Production ===
The Discovery of a World Inside the Moone was produced and mixed by Robert Schneider. The album was engineered by The Apples in Stereo with Ron Marschall, Robert Christiansen and Jim McIntyre. The album was recorded between May 1999 and February 2000 at Pet Sounds Recording Studio (Denver, Colorado) using a 16-track tape machine and the Elephant 6 Mainframe Computer. Jim McIntyre acted as executive producer for The Elephant 6 Recording Company.

Album art for the album was created by Star Keene (architectural drawings), Steve Keene (interior paintings) and Richard Peterson (photographs). Layout by Joel Marrowitz.
