= Fun Trick Noisemaker =

Album by The Apples in Stereo

Studio album by the Apples in Stereo
- Released: May 2, 1995
- Recorded: October 1994 – February 1995
- Genres: Psychedelic pop, indie rock, power pop
- Length: 39:54; 44:35 (Japanese release)
- Labels: SpinART (spart 42), Elephant 6
- Producer: Robert Schneider

The Apples in Stereo chronology
Hypnotic Suggestion EP (1994)	Fun Trick Noisemaker (1995)	Science Faire (1996)

Professional ratings
Review scores
Source	Rating
AllMusic	4.5/5 stars
Robert Christgau	(dud)

Fun Trick Noisemaker is the debut studio album by the Apples in Stereo. It was recorded in a house in Los Angeles, in Robert Schneider's (at the time) portable Pet Sounds Studio. It was released in 1995 via SpinART.

The album is perhaps the most raw example of the Apples, with the rather lo-fi recording values being eclipsed somewhat by their later efforts. It is one of the band's most critically lauded albums.

Though the album is an early effort in production by Schneider, he had previously had experience producing with the Apples in Stereo and his own solo project, Marbles. Learning to be a record producer since he was fifteen years old, his influence from producers such as Phil Spector and Brian Wilson led him to use the popular "Wall of Sound" production technique on Fun Trick Noisemaker. Several tracks (notably the opening song "Tidal Wave") have as many as ten guitars playing at any one time (usually eight rhythm guitars and two guitars used for solos).

The Japanese version of Fun Trick Noisemaker contains the extra tracks "Shine (In Your Mind)" and "Thank You Very Much". These tracks can be found in mp3 format on the Elephant 6 website. They were later included on the 2008 b-sides and rarities compilation, Electronic Projects for Musicians.

== Production ==
Fun Trick Noisemaker was produced by Robert Schneider and engineered by the Apples in Stereo, with technical assistance from Kurt Heasley. The album was recorded on an 8-track analog from October 1994 to February 1995 at Brandt Larson's house (Glendora, CA) and Kyle Jones' house (Denver, CO). The LP was mastered by Paul Brekus, Aardvark Records. The CD was mastered by Park Peters, Audio Park.

The first track entitled "The Narrator" is an old 1960s recording describing the Relay 2 communications satellite. As described by Robert Schneider:

...It's from an old record that my friend Jeff [Mangum] found in a used record store one day. He was just listening to a bunch of old demonstration records and stuff, found that, and said 'Robert - you've gotta listen to this!' I listened to it, and said, 'Oh my god, that's the beginning of our album!' I cut it up a bit, the dialog - it's not exactly like it was, but pretty close. The record was printed for some convention in the '60s trying to determine what wavelength to use for satellite broadcasts, which was best suited for stereo music programs. It wasn't really released, it was just for this conference. We were only able to track down one person who was involved. He's some executive now, and he just said 'yeah, go ahead, use it.'

— Robert Schneider

The cover art for Fun Trick Noisemaker is from prolific artist Steve Keene. Robert Schneider, familiar with Keene's work on a Silver Jews record, contacted Keene about doing the cover. Keene sent him several paintings (about thirty six), and the band picked eight for final production. The original CD packaging liner notes were printed in a manner that they could be unfolded and re-folded to show a different cover. The back cover art was done by William Cullen Hart.

== Track listing ==
All lyrics are written by Robert Schneider except where noted.

No.	Title	Length
1.	"The Narrator"	0:35
2.	"Tidal Wave" (R. Schneider/Chris Parfitt)	3:26
3.	"High Tide"	2:33
4.	"Green Machine"	2:50
5.	"Winter Must Be Cold" (Hilarie Sidney)	3:16
6.	"She's Just Like Me / Taking Time"	4:36
7.	"Glowworm"	3:02
8.	"Dots 1-2-3" (Jim McIntyre/R. Schneider)	2:31
9.	"Lucky Charm"	3:26
10.	"Innerspace" (R. Schneider/John Hill)	2:36
11.	"Show the World"	2:29
12.	"Love You Alice / D"	4:27
13.	"Pine Away"	4:07
Total length:		39:54

Japanese edition bonus tracks
No.	Title	Length
14.	"Shine (In Your Mind)"	3:36
15.	"Thank You Very Much"	1:05
Total length:		44:35

== Personnel ==
The Apples in Stereo

As they appear on the sound recording:

- Hilarie Sidney - drums, vocals, guitar, maraca, bells
- Robert Schneider - vocals, guitars, piano, melodica, Jupiter and Moog keyboards, bass
- John Hill - guitars, vocals, bass

Other performers

- Jim McIntyre - bass on tracks 2, 4, 8 and 12
- Kurt Heasley - guitar on track 3, vocals, tambourine
- Joel Evans - bass on track 10
- Jeff Mangum - bass on track 7
- Kyle Jones - vocals
