= Chris Parfitt =

American guitarist

Chris Parfitt is an American guitarist who was one of the founding members of the Elephant 6 indie pop band The Apples in Stereo. Before his 1993 departure, he co-wrote the songs "Tidal Wave" and "Not the Same" with Robert Schneider and his performances appear on the band's original self-titled EP Apples.

Parfitt met Robert Schneider in 1992 through a classified ad looking for a bass player. They hit it off over a mutual love of Pavement and The Beach Boys. Before long he was introduced to Jim McIntyre and Hilarie Sidney, and the four started the Apples.

Since leaving The Apples, Parfitt has been recording sporadically with the band Vince Mole and His Calcium Orchestra, where bandmates include Kingsauce members Richie Chodes and Kevin Swope.

On September 21, 2007, Parfitt made a brief appearance at Maxwell's in Hoboken, NJ, a reunion of sorts during which he joined the band playing guitar on some of The Apples' early songs.
