= John Hill (musician) =

American guitarist

- Born: 1960's Washington, D.C.
- Genres: Indie pop, indie rock
- Occupations: Guitarist, recording engineer, producer
- Instrument: Guitar
- Years active: 1993–present

John Hill is an American guitarist best recognized as a member of The Apples in Stereo and Dressy Bessy.

Hill, a college friend of drummer Hilarie Sidney and bassist Jim McIntyre, joined The Apples in January, 1994 after the departure of lead guitarist Chris Parfitt. At the time, The Apples needed a lead guitarist, but it was evident to the band members that Hill's jangly style was better suited to rhythm guitar. Frontman Robert Schneider thus became the band's lead guitarist. Hill has been a full-time recording and touring member of the band ever since.

In 1997 Hill joined the band Dressy Bessy as the lead guitarist with girlfriend Tammy Ealom. He continues to perform with both bands.

Hill was also briefly a member of Von Hemmling with Hilarie Sidney and Jim McIntyre before joining The Apples in Stereo.
