= Hilarie Sidney =

American drummer

- Genres: Indie pop, indie rock
- Occupation(s): Drummer, singer-songwriter, guitarist
- Instrument(s): Drums, vocals, guitar

Hilarie Sidney is an American musician best known as the longtime drummer for The Apples in Stereo. She was previously married to Robert Schneider, the band's frontman and Elephant 6 co-founder. Their divorce was announced in 2004. She was half of the now-defunct Elephant 6 duo Secret Square and, with her now-husband Per Ole Bratset, she is a major creative talent behind The High Water Marks.

Her departure as drummer and vocalist for The Apples in Stereo was announced on August 12, 2006, during the band's closing live performance at Athens Popfest 2006, in Athens, Georgia. On September 1, 2006, Sidney said that her main reasons for leaving were to focus on her family and The High Water Marks.

Sidney has also played drums for Von Hemmling with Jim McIntyre and John Hill.

== Discography ==
=== The Apples in Stereo ===
For a complete list, see The Apples in Stereo discography.

- Fun Trick Noisemaker (1995)
- Tone Soul Evolution (1997)
- Her Wallpaper Reverie (1999)
- The Discovery of a World Inside the Moone (2000)
- Velocity of Sound (2002)
- New Magnetic Wonder (2007)

=== Secret Square ===
- "Secret Square" (7" vinyl single) (1995)
- Secret Square (LP) (1995)

=== The High Water Marks ===
- Songs About the Ocean (2004)
- Polar (2007)
- Ecstasy Rhymes (2020)
- Proclaimer of Things (2022)
- Your Next Wolf (2023)
- Consult The Oracle (2025)
