= The Apples in Stereo =

American pop/rock band

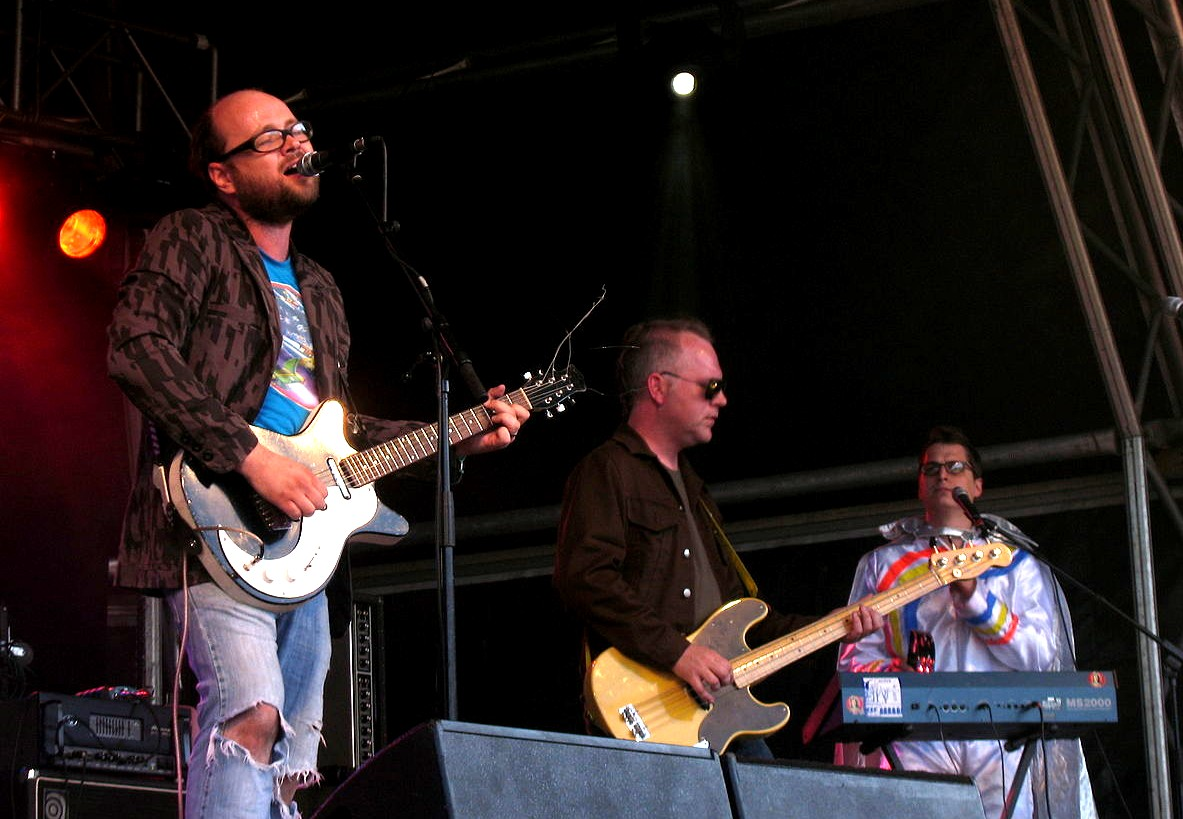
- The Apples in Stereo performing at the Primavera Festival in Barcelona in June 2007

Background information
- Origin: Denver, Colorado, U.S.
- Genres: Indie pop; indie rock; psychedelic pop; power pop; neo-psychedelia
- Years active: 1991–present
- Labels: Elephant 6; SpinART; Simian; Yep Roc
- Members: Robert Schneider; John Hill; Eric Allen; John Dufilho; John Ferguson; Ben Phelan
- Past members: Hilarie Sidney; Jim McIntyre; Jeff Mangum; Chris Parfitt; Chris McDuffie; Bill Doss
- Website: applesinstereo.com

The Apples in Stereo are an American indie rock band associated with Elephant 6 Collective. The band is largely the project of lead vocalist/guitarist/producer Robert Schneider, who writes the majority of the band's music and lyrics. Currently, the Apples in Stereo also includes longstanding members John Hill (rhythm guitar) and Eric Allen (bass), as well as more recent members John Dufilho (drums), John Ferguson (keyboards), and Ben Phelan (keyboards/guitar/trumpet).

The band's sound draws comparisons to the psychedelic rock of the Beatles and the Beach Boys during the 1960s, as well as to bands such as Electric Light Orchestra and Pavement, and also draws from lo-fi, garage rock, new wave, R&B, bubblegum pop, power pop, punk, electro-pop and experimental music.

The band is also well known for their appearance in a Powerpuff Girls music video performing the song "Signal in the Sky (Let's Go)". It aired immediately after the show's seventh episode of season 4, "Superfriends", which was based on the song's lyrics. The band has appeared widely in television and film, including performances on The Colbert Report, Late Night with Conan O'Brien and Last Call with Carson Daly, guest hosting on MTV, song placements in numerous television shows, commercials and motion pictures, the performance of the single "Energy" by the contestants on American Idol, and a song recorded for children's show Yo Gabba Gabba.

== Band history ==
=== 1991–1993: The Apples ===
In late 1991, Robert Schneider met Jim McIntyre on a commuter bus in Denver, Colorado. Schneider had recently moved to Colorado from Ruston, Louisiana, and often initiated conversations with McIntyre. When Schneider asked McIntyre what his music interests were, McIntyre named his two favorite bands: the Beatles and the Beach Boys—two bands which Schneider was particularly fond of. Realizing that they shared many musical interests, McIntyre introduced Schneider to Hilarie Sidney. McIntyre already had a band called Von Hemmling in which McIntyre played bass and Sidney played drums. With Schneider, they discussed the idea of starting a band and perhaps a recording label. Schneider later met Chris Parfitt, who at the time was also already in a band (which Schneider unsuccessfully auditioned for on bass). Schneider and Parfitt also became friends, however, and toyed with the idea of having a rock band similar to the Velvet Underground or Black Sabbath, with production qualities similar to that of the Beatles and the Beach Boys.

Schneider then spent two weeks in Athens, Georgia recording music and spending time with his childhood friends Will Cullen Hart, Bill Doss and Jeff Mangum. He discussed the idea of starting a record label with them (which soon became The Elephant 6 Recording Company). It was also at this time that the name The Apples came about, inspired by the Pink Floyd song "Apples and Oranges".

The earliest incarnation of the band began to form in 1992 upon Schneider's return to Denver, first between Schneider and Parfitt, both of whom played guitar. The two recruited McIntyre and Sidney during the autumn of that year, practicing material through the winter. Their first few live shows took place the following January, many of which were with the band Felt Pilotes. Their first performance with a "real" drum set was as the opening act for Little Fyodor. From February to April 1993, the band recorded their debut 7-inch EP, Tidal Wave, and released it in June as the first record ever to bear the Elephant 6 logo.

=== 1994–1995: Hypnotic Suggestion and Fun Trick Noisemaker ===
Several conflicts would lead Parfitt to leave the band in early 1994. John Hill, a former bandmate of McIntyre's, would join the band as a rhythm guitarist while Schneider began to grow more comfortable playing lead guitar. It was also at this time that Schneider began to take stronger creative control of the band, shifting its sound from its stronger rock qualities to a spacier pop sound. The band started work on a debut album, but it instead became Hypnotic Suggestion, a second EP. However, after SpinART Records offered to buy the band an 8-track in return for an album, new plans for an LP arose.

In mid-1994, after Hypnotic Suggestion, McIntyre would be the second to leave the band, due to a number of personal distresses as well as stylistic changes that arose with Parfitt's departure. Having great difficulty finding a new permanent bassist, the band would rotate a number of frequent bass contributors, including Jeff Mangum of Neutral Milk Hotel, Kurt Heasley of The Lilys, Kyle Jones, Joel Richardson, and Joel Evans. Jim McIntyre would also occasionally guest on bass. This continued to be the makeup of the band as they toured the country in late 1994, recording the first half of their new album in Glendora, California. In early 1995, the band finished the album, Fun Trick Noisemaker, at Kyle Jones's house (the birthplace of Schneider's Pet Sounds Studio).

Now with an LP to support, the band began touring again. Eric Allen, whom the band had previously auditioned as a guitarist after the departure of Chris Parfitt, joined the band as a much welcomed permanent bassist. Late 1995, Schneider relocated Pet Sounds Studio to Jim McIntyre's house. McIntyre continued to be involved in the recording and engineering of the band's albums until the mid-2000s.

A significantly different band from the original 1992 four-piece, the official name of the band gradually became "the Apples in Stereo", with the "in stereo" usually somewhat under-emphasized, whether in lower-case or in parentheses. Schneider described this in an interview: "It's very clearcut, actually: we're The Apples, the music's in stereo. It's not actually the band name – it's a step back from it, a band name once removed. We're The Apples, in stereo. Kind of like a TV show, 'in stereo!' That always seemed to be a really big deal, that it was in stereo." McIntyre later remarked, "It's cool the name changed cause the Apples and the Apples in Stereo were really two different entities."

=== 1996–2005: Tone Soul Evolution to Velocity of Sound ===
The band continued touring through 1996, playing in Japan for the first time. Several early recording sessions were held at Pet Sounds for the band's second album, Tone Soul Evolution, but the members were dissatisfied with the quality of the recordings. The majority of the album's songs were re-recorded at Studio .45 in Hartford, Connecticut before the album's release. In 1998, Chris McDuffie joined the band, playing various instruments including organs, synthesizers and assorted percussion. He would leave the band before Velocity of Sound was released in 2002.

Several more albums were released by the band through the years, including the psychedelic "concept EP", Her Wallpaper Reverie, The Discovery of a World Inside the Moone and Velocity of Sound; both of the latter of which were progressively aimed at capturing the live sound of the band, which continued to tighten as they continued to perform hundreds of live shows (about 100 a year). In particular, the 2002 album Velocity of Sound rejects most of the psych-pop production sensibilities that would come to be associated with the band, instead featuring stripped-down production and sparse, rock instrumentation.

The band members would also continue to pursue careers in side bands and solo projects, with Schneider producing several albums for Elephant 6 artists. Schneider and drummer Hilarie Sidney were married for a time, with a son Max born in 2000. They have since been divorced.

The band went on a brief hiatus during 2004 as Schneider released the debut album from a new band called Ulysses and Sidney released the debut album from her new band The High Water Marks; both were released on Eenie Meenie Records. In 2005, the Apples in Stereo contributed "Liza Jane" to the Eenie Meenie compilation, Dimension Mix. It was also around this time that news began to circulate among various websites concerning the band's next studio album.

=== 2006–2008: New Magnetic Wonder and evolving lineup ===
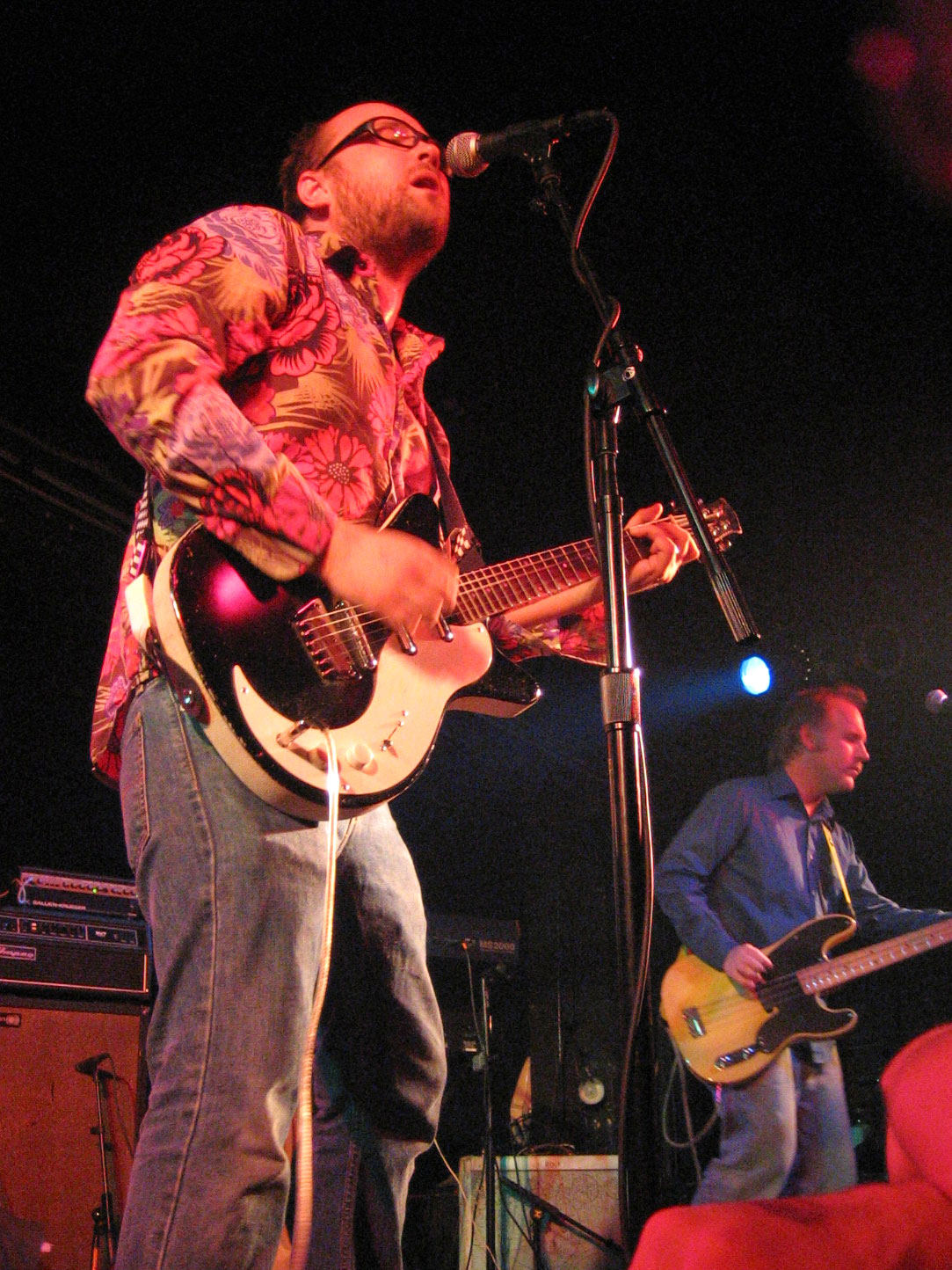
The group performing in Washington, D.C. in October 2006

In August 2006, longtime drummer Hilarie Sidney officially announced her departure from the band during the band's closing set at the Athens Popfest music festival in Athens, Georgia. Her replacement, John Dufilho, lead singer and principal songwriter of The Deathray Davies, was announced in October 2006. 2006 touring member Bill Doss of the Olivia Tremor Control also quietly joined the band "officially" as its new keyboardist. John Ferguson of Big Fresh and Ulysses joined the Apples in 2007, also playing keyboards, and wearing a Doctor Who-esque space suit on stage.

In December 2006, Robert Schneider appeared on the popular television show The Colbert Report singing the song "Stephen Stephen" recorded by the Apples in Stereo to glorify the show's host Stephen Colbert, to kick off a guitar solo contest between Colbert and Chris Funk of The Decemberists.

On February 6, 2007, the Apples in Stereo released their sixth studio LP, New Magnetic Wonder. Finishing a ten-year deal with spinART Records, New Magnetic Wonder was the premiere release on Simian Records, a newly formed record label founded by Elijah Wood. This was followed by a long-awaited b-sides and rarities compilation titled Electronic Projects for Musicians, released on April 1.

In 2008, spinART Records went out of business. Rights for all major releases by the Apples in Stereo on the label were subsequently acquired by One Little Indian Records, and have since reverted to the band. In a recent interview, Schneider noted that the band's EPs have yet to have been re-released, but will likely be collected for another compilation. Such a compilation would probably include the re-releases of Look Away + 4, Let's Go! and a number of non-album songs released alongside New Magnetic Wonder.

On August 4, 2008, the band appeared again on The Colbert Report. They performed their song Can You Feel It? to promote the release of the Japanese picture disc.

In early 2008, their song "Same Old Drag" won in The 7th Annual Independent Music Awards for Best Pop/Rock Song. The same year Apples in Stereo were nominated for Independent Music Awards Pop/Rock Album of the Year. The band members also joined the 9th annual Independent Music Awards judging panel to assist independent musicians' careers.

=== 2009–2011: #1 Hits Explosion and Travellers in Space and Time ===
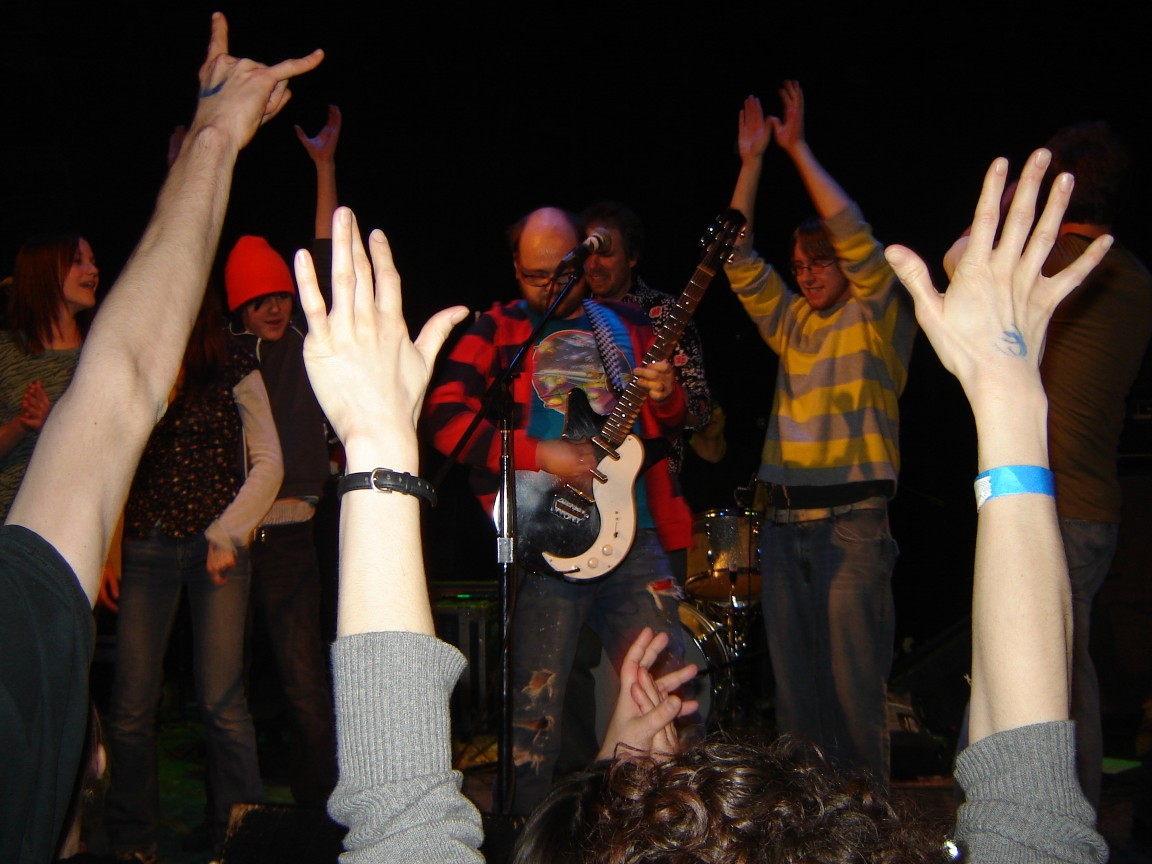
The group performing at the Blue Note in March 2007.

Yep Roc released #1 Hits Explosion, an Apples in Stereo best-of album, on September 1, 2009.

In late 2008, PepsiCo released an advertisement with their song "Energy" off of their album New Magnetic Wonder.

In early 2009, Robert appeared on ABC News's segment called "amplified" and gave some short performances of songs from New Magnetic Wonder and a song from his project "Robert Bobbert and the bubble machine" and he described the album as sounding like early 1970s R&B as it would sound played by aliens and emanating from an alien spaceship.He also confirmed that the band was recording their new album at Trout Recording in Brooklyn, New York. In interviews in Billboard magazine and other press outlets,

In April 2009, the single "Energy" from New Magnetic Wonder was performed by the contestants on the television show American Idol and also appears in the AGL Energy commercial in Australia.

The result was the band's seventh album Travellers in Space and Time, released on April 20, 2010, on Simian Records. Described by Schneider as a "retro-futuristic" concept album intended as a time capsule for listeners of the future, Travellers has drawn comparisons to the style of Electric Light Orchestra. The record is the first Apples in Stereo album without Hilarie Sidney, making Schneider the last founding member remaining in the group, although John Hill joined before "in stereo" was added to the name. The band was invited by Jeff Mangum of Neutral Milk Hotel to perform at the All Tomorrow's Parties festival that he curated in March 2012 in Minehead, England.

Schneider announced in May 2012 that the Apples in Stereo had begun work on a new album, described as being "a very, very different sort of album."

In recent years, Schneider has explored a number of experimental music projects, such as the Teletron mind-controlled synthesizer and Non-Pythagorean scale of his own invention.

=== 2012–present: Death of Bill Doss, hiatus and future ===
The death of Bill Doss, the band's keyboardist as well as the co-founder of fellow Elephant 6 band the Olivia Tremor Control, was announced on July 31, 2012. The cause of death was an aneurysm. Schneider released a statement saying, "I am heartbroken by the loss of my life-long friend, collaborator and band-mate. My world will never be the same without the wonderful, funny, supremely creative Bill Doss."

The band went into hiatus in the fall of 2012, after Doss' death and Schneider's acceptance into the PhD program in Mathematics at Emory University. In 2013, Phish started covering the Apples in Stereo song "Energy."

In early 2017, Schneider hinted at a new album called The Bicycle Day. He stated on Facebook that "Apples are working on a concept record called The Bicycle Day but it is too deep of a task to finish while I'm in graduate school... it isn't a pop record though ... (Air-Sea Dolphin and my band Spaceflyte with John Ferguson are the new pop projects though)". On August 10, 2017, the Apples played their first show since 2012 as a headlining act at the Athens Popfest music festival in Athens, Georgia with Marshmallow Coast, Antlered Auntlord, and Waxahatchee as prior performers.

In 2018, Schneider received a PhD in mathematics from Emory. In 2021, Schneider became a mathematics lecturer at University of Georgia. As of 2022, Schneider is Assistant Professor, Mathematical Sciences at Michigan Technological University.

== Band members ==
Current members

- Robert Schneider – guitar, lead vocals, French horn (1992–present)
- John Hill – guitar, xylophone (1994–present)
- Eric Allen – bass, harmonica (1995–present)
- John Dufilho – drums, harp (2006–present)
- John Ferguson – keyboards, vocals, panflute (2007–present)

Former members

- Hilarie Sidney – drums, vocals (1992–2006)
- Jeff Mangum – bass, backing vocals (1994–1995)
- Jim McIntyre – bass (1992–1994)
- Chris Parfitt – guitar (1992–1994)
- Chris McDuffie – keyboards (1998–2002)
- Bill Doss – keyboards, vocals, ukulele, acoustic guitar (2006–2012; died 2012)

Timeline

== Selected discography ==
- Fun Trick Noisemaker (1995)
- Science Faire (1996)
- Tone Soul Evolution (1997)
- Her Wallpaper Reverie (1999)
- The Discovery of a World Inside the Moone (2000)
- Velocity of Sound (2002)
- New Magnetic Wonder (2007)
- Electronic Projects for Musicians (2008)
- Travellers in Space and Time (2010)
