= Robert Schneider =

American musician

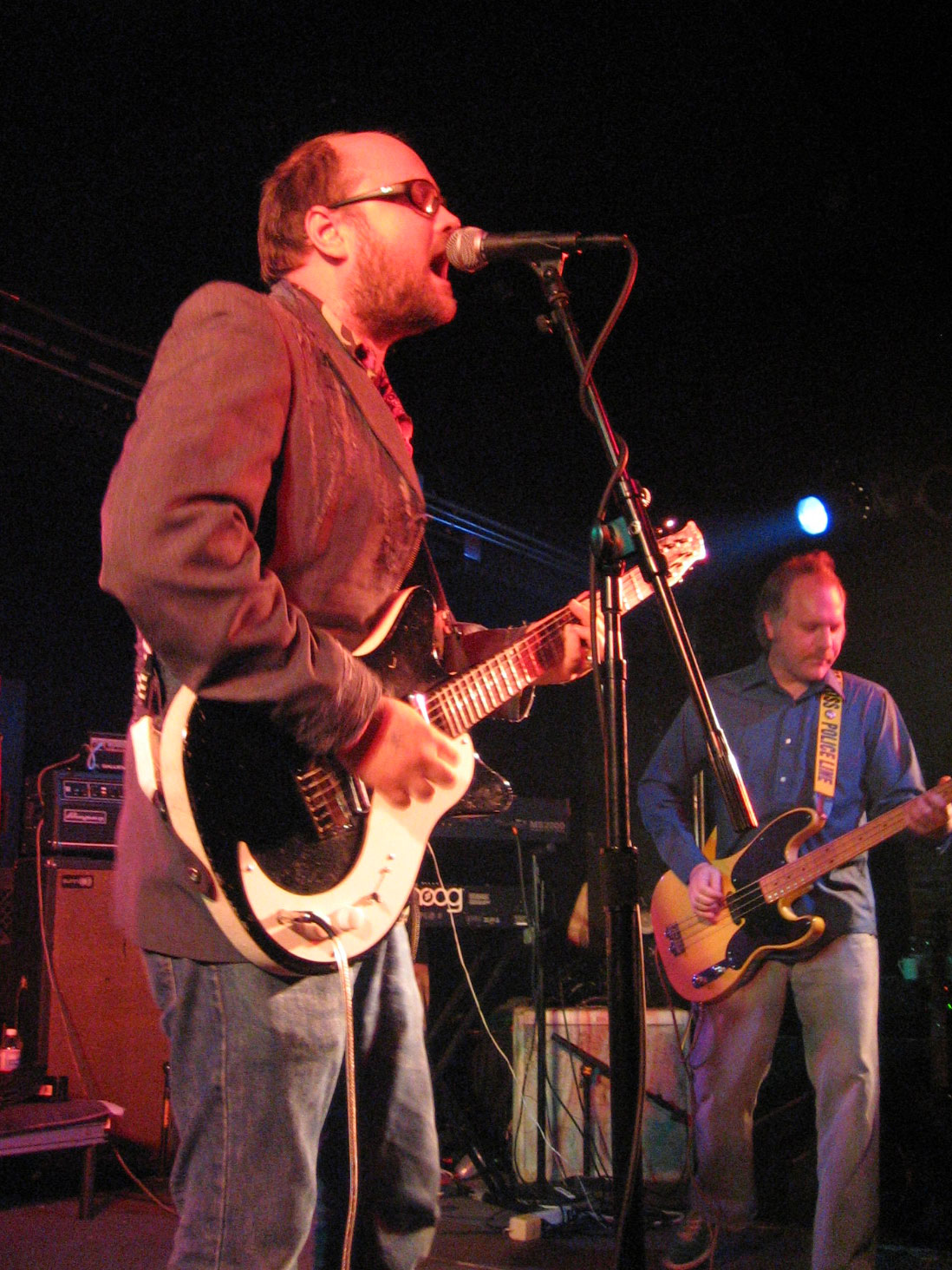
- Schneider performing at The Black Cat nightclub in 2006

Background information
- Born: Robert Peter Schneider; March 9, 1971 (age 55); Cape Town, South Africa
- Origin: Ruston, Louisiana, US
- Genres: Psychedelic pop, indie pop, indie rock, experimental music
- Occupations: Musician, mathematician, singer, songwriter, composer, producer, engineer
- Instruments: Vocals, guitar, keyboards, bass
- Years active: 1987–present
- Labels: The Elephant 6 Recording Co., spinART, Eenie Meenie, Yep Roc/Simian, Garden Gate, Fire, Chunklet Industries, Cloud Recordings

Robert Peter Schneider (born March 9, 1971) is an American musician and mathematician. He is the lead singer, songwriter, guitarist and producer of rock/pop band the Apples in Stereo and has produced and performed on albums by Neutral Milk Hotel, the Olivia Tremor Control, the Minders and a number of other psychedelic and indie rock bands, as well as by Yoko Ono and Cornelius. Schneider co-founded the Elephant 6 Recording Company in 1992. He received a PhD in mathematics from Emory University in 2018 (doctoral advisor Ken Ono). As of September 2022, he is an assistant professor of mathematical sciences at Michigan Technological University specializing in number theory and combinatorics, particularly the theory of integer partitions and analytic number theory.

== Life and career ==
=== Early life ===
After spending the first six years of his life in Cape Town, South Africa, Robert Schneider's family moved to Ruston, Louisiana, where his father had taken a job teaching architecture at Louisiana Tech University. There, Schneider befriended Bill Doss, Will Cullen Hart and Jeff Mangum, and began discovering and playing music with them. After graduating from Ruston High School, where he was Junior and Senior class president, and spending two years at Centenary College in Shreveport, Louisiana, Schneider moved to Denver, Colorado to attend the University of Colorado. Although he subsequently left school to pursue his musical ambitions, his academic interests remained strong as an avid student of analytic number theory.

=== The Apples in Stereo and Elephant 6 ===
Soon after moving to Denver, Colorado in 1991 Schneider met Hilarie Sidney, Jim McIntyre and Chris Parfitt, who formed the indie pop band the Apples (the name was subsequently changed to the Apples in Stereo). The group made their first release in 1993 with the Tidal Wave EP that became the inaugural release on the Elephant 6 record label.

Schneider's prowess in harnessing the sounds of Elephant 6 bands became apparent with his distinct production style. In addition to producing all of the albums for the Apples in Stereo, he's produced work for the Olivia Tremor Control, the Minders and a number of other artists, but is best known as a producer for his work on Neutral Milk Hotel’s critically lauded In the Aeroplane Over the Sea. The Wall of Sound production style implemented by his heroes Phil Spector and Brian Wilson was used on these records and cemented Schneider's reputation as the producer-engineer behind the sound of many bands of the Elephant 6 label, which grew through the 1990s into a sprawling collective of psychedelic pop and experimental groups.

=== Solo work and other bands ===
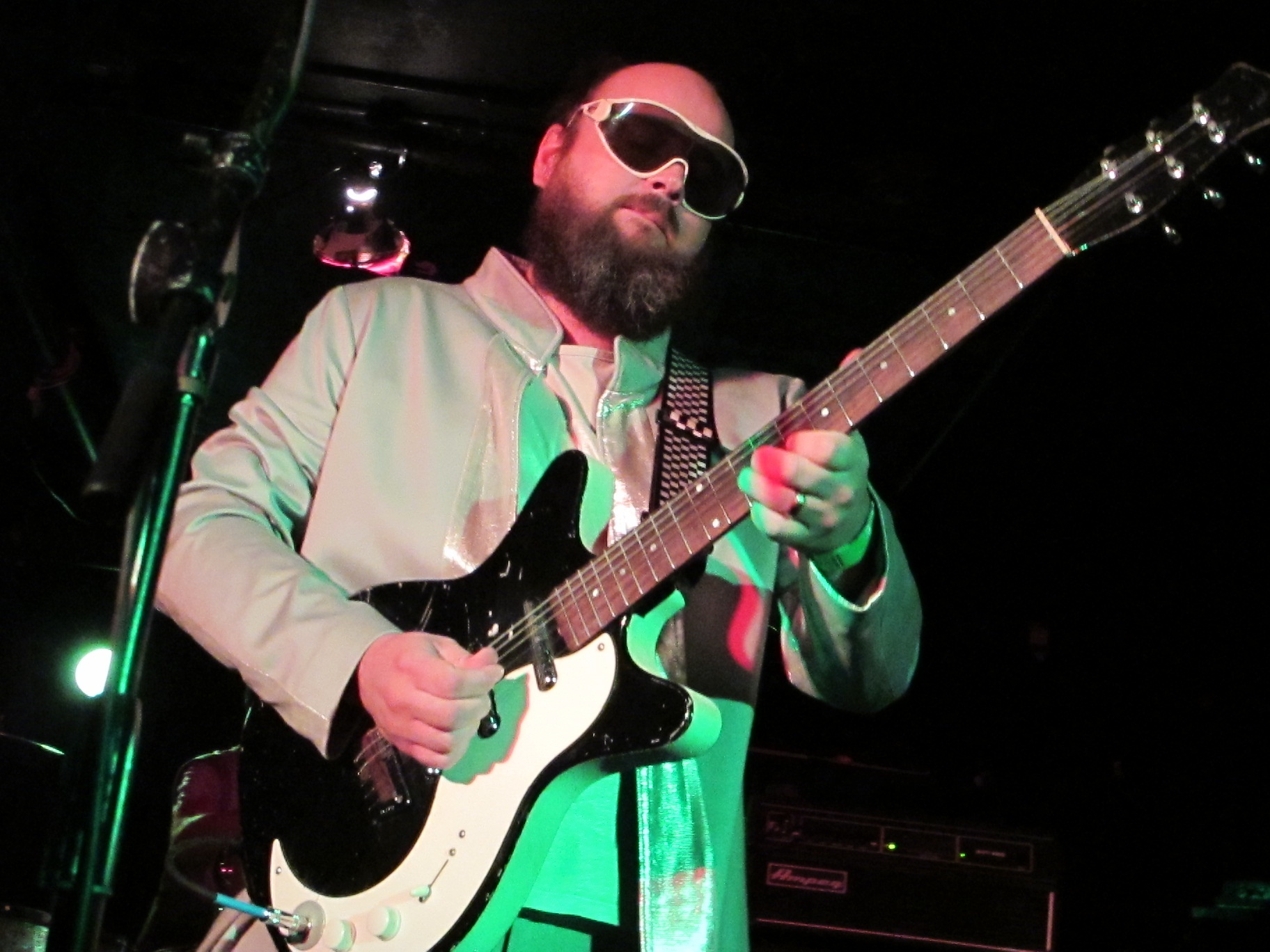
Schneider in 2010

Schneider has a number of solo projects. One, a project called Marbles, began with lo-fi Beach Boys-esque recordings done with Will Cullen Hart, and is the name most of Schneider's solo work appears under, beginning with the 1996 debut album "Pyramid Landing" and Other Favorites on spinART Records. Another project, Orchestre Fantastique, is an instrumental venture which recorded a soundtrack for the as-yet unreleased film Dean Quixote. Schneider also collaborated with Andy Partridge of XTC in the early 2000s, with the pair reportedly writing over thirty songs together by telephone; the project, however, produced no recorded results. Schneider also composed a number of jingles for television commercials during the 2000s, including a string of pop songs for the Kohl's department store chain.

Schneider formed a comparatively dark band in 2004 called Ulysses in Lexington, Kentucky, which released the 2005 album 010 on Eenie Meenie Records recorded live with a single microphone, and released a second Marbles album Expo in 2005 influenced by Electric Light Orchestra, as well as Gary Numan, Michael Jackson, New Order and the Cars.

During 2006, it was announced that Schneider was playing in a Kentucky-based psychedelic garage band with his brother-in-law, Craig Morris, called Thee American Revolution. Thee American Revolution released the lo-fi psych-pop album Buddha Electrostorm in 2009 on Garden Gate Records; the album was reissued worldwide on December 5, 2011, on the UK label Fire Records.

Since 2007, Schneider occasionally records and performs children's music as Robbert Bobbert and released an album Robbert Bobbert and the Bubble Machine; as well as having composed the score for the animated anthology short series Shorty McShorts' Shorts' final episode, Flip-Flopped, under that name.

In 2017, Schneider formed the Atlanta-based band Air-sea Dolphin with guitarist Matt Chapman and bassist Mike Chapman (better known as The Brothers Chaps, creators of Homestar Runner), guitarist Ryan Sterritt and drummer James Huggins III (Of Montreal, Elf Power, Great Lakes, James Husband).

=== Mathematics and experimental music ===
Schneider has engaged in a number of experimental music projects taking inspiration from mathematical concepts. He has written several compositions using a non-Pythagorean scale based on logarithms. He has also incorporated prime numbers and the sieve of Eratosthenes in both a composition to be performed by a bell tower, and in the score for a play by mathematician Andrew Granville and playwright Jennifer Granville that debuted at the Institute for Advanced Study on December 12, 2009, and he has written a plan for an electronic composition based on prime numbers lasting millions of years.

Since September 2010, Schneider has performed using a mind-controlled analog synthesizer. The mind-controlled synthesizer uses a voltage generator made from a circuit-bent Mattel MindFlex electronic toy, scored for one "conductor" wearing an EEG sensor. Schneider, along with experimental musician and visual artist Robert Beatty, use the voltage generator to control the filters of Moog synthesizers. Pieces performed with mind control include Schneider's "Composition for Two Hemispheres" and a score by Jeff Mangum of Neutral Milk Hotel. Other experimental musicians have subsequently built similar units from an instructional video Schneider released online.

In 2012, Schneider completed his bachelor's degree (BS) in mathematics from the University of Kentucky. That same year, he announced he was stopping touring; whether this hiatus is temporary or permanent is unclear. In 2018, Schneider completed a PhD in mathematics from Emory University, where he studied number theory under Ken Ono. From 2018-2022, Schneider was a lecturer in mathematics at the University of Georgia. As of September 2022 he is an assistant professor of mathematical sciences at Michigan Technological University.

==== Non-Pythagorean scale ====
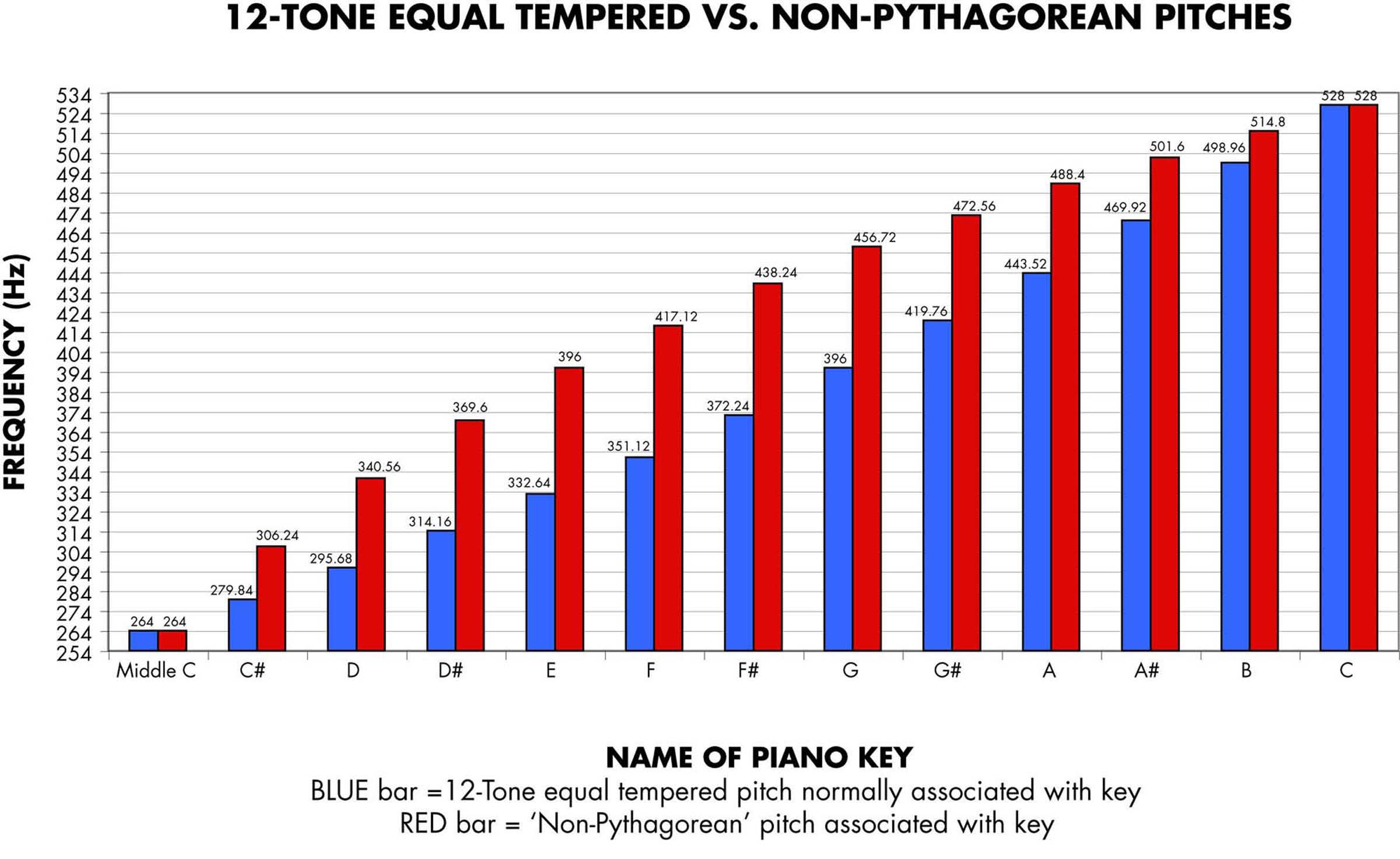
Approximate comparison of Non-Pythagorean pitches (red) to 12-tone equal tempered pitches (blue). Note that, while the equal tempered pitches increase exponentially, the pitches found lower on the Non-Pythagorean scale have frequencies that are farther apart while pitches found higher on the scale are closer together.

Schneider conceived and developed a new non-Pythagorean scale with frequencies corresponding to the natural logarithms of successive whole numbers.

The scale was introduced in 2007 with the release of New Magnetic Wonder, the sixth studio album by the Apples in Stereo. The album featured two brief compositions using the scale. Enhanced CD versions of the album included a third composition as well as a variety of information from Schneider concerning the scale including audio files and instructions to enable the listener to prepare a MIDI keyboard to play in the non-Pythagorean scale.

== Performing discography ==
Below is a list of selected works crediting Schneider as performer (incomplete list).

=== The Apples in Stereo ===
- Fun Trick Noisemaker (1995)
- Science Faire (1996)
- Tone Soul Evolution (1997)
- Her Wallpaper Reverie (1999)
- The Discovery of a World Inside the Moone (2000)
- Velocity of Sound (2002)
- New Magnetic Wonder (2007)
- Electronic Projects for Musicians (2008)
- Travellers in Space and Time (2010)

=== Marbles ===
- Inverse Gazebo (Cassette Only) (1993)
- Warm Milk and Chocolate (Cassette Only) (1993)
- I ♥ the Animals (Cassette Only) (1993)
- Pyramid Landing (And Other Favorites) (1997)
- I Love the Summer Days b/w Our Song (For Eirene) (Seven-inch single) (1998)
- Christmas With Marbles (Seven-inch single) (2004)
- Expo (2005)
- Dracula (Split seven-inch single with Casper and the Cookies) (2007)
- New Emotion (feat. Max Schneider) b/w Free From Grief (Digital single) (2024)

=== Neutral Milk Hotel ===
- On Avery Island (1996)
- In the Aeroplane Over the Sea (1998)

=== The Olivia Tremor Control ===
- Music from the Unrealized Film Script, Dusk at Cubist Castle (1996)
- Black Foliage: Animation Music Volume One (1999)

=== The Minders ===
- Come On & Hear (7") (1996)
- Hooray for Tuesday (1998)

=== Cornelius ===
- Fantasma (Cornelius album) (1997)

=== Major Organ and the Adding Machine ===
- Major Organ and the Adding Machine (2001) (suspected)

=== Orchestre Fantastique ===
- Dean Quixote Soundtrack (2001)

=== Ulysses ===
- 010 (2004)

=== Yoko Ono ===
- Yes, I'm a Witch (2007)

=== Thee American Revolution ===
- Buddha Electrostorm (2008)

=== Robbert Bobbert & the Bubble Machine ===
- Robbert Bobbert & The Bubble Machine (2009)

=== Sound of Ceres ===
- Nostalgia For Infinity (2016)

=== Air-Sea Dolphin ===
- "Exploding" / "Spillman Was a Motorhead" (2017) 7" split single with Honey Radar
- "Bells (Song for Geoff W) + ASD Theme" / "B-est of B-sides + American Football Championship" (2018) 7" split single with Sloshy

=== Big Fresh ===
- Fall Preview (EP) (2017)

=== The Patient ===
- "Extension 9" / "Colony of Taste" (2017) 7" split single with Breathers

=== Teletron Ensemble ===
- Composition for Two Hemispheres (12" EP) (2021)

=== Obligatory Refractions ===
- Sloan Brothers / Obligatory Refractions (2022) 7" split EP with Sloan Brothers
- "Black Hole" (Download) (2023) featured on An Otherworldly Light 1 compilation

=== Robert Schneider (solo) ===
- Songs for Other Worlds (Cassette and download) (2022)
- Man and the Computer (Download) (2024)
- 1983 [Dedicated to Paul Schreiber] (Download) (2025)

== Producing discography ==
In addition to producing all of the albums for the Apples in Stereo, Schneider has produced, engineered and mixed numerous albums for fellow Elephant 6 bands and other artists, including the following.

- Neutral Milk Hotel: On Avery Island (1996) (producer, engineer, mixing)
- Neutral Milk Hotel: In the Aeroplane Over the Sea (1998) (producer, engineer, mixing)
- Neutral Milk Hotel: Ferris Wheel on Fire (2011) (producer, engineer, mixing)
- The Olivia Tremor Control: Music from the Unrealized Film Script, Dusk at Cubist Castle (1996) (co-producer, engineer, mixing)
- The Olivia Tremor Control: Black Foliage: Animation Music Volume One (1999) (engineer)
- The Minders: Hooray for Tuesday (1998) (producer, engineer, mixing)
- Dressy Bessy: Pink Hearts Yellow Moons (1999) (engineer, mixing)
- Beulah: When Your Heartstrings Break (1999) (mixing)
- Great Lakes: Great Lakes (2000) (mixing)
- The High Water Marks: Songs About the Ocean (2004) (mixing)
