= Jim McIntyre (musician) =

Jim McIntyre is a musician best known as the man behind the Elephant 6 band Von Hemmling. He was also the original bassist for The Apples in Stereo before leaving in 1993. He has written or co-written many early songs for the band, including "Stop Along the Way", "Touch The Water", "To Love The Vibration Of The Bulb" and "Dots 1-2-3". He also plays bass on several tracks that appear on the debut album Fun Trick Noisemaker, as well as engineering and performing on other Apples in Stereo albums. An incarnation of Robert Schneider's Pet Sounds Studio was located at McIntyre's residence, where influential albums such as In the Aeroplane Over the Sea by Neutral Milk Hotel were recorded.
