= Elephant 6 =

American musical collective

The official Elephant 6 logo, which was commonly affixed to recordings from bands associated with the collective

The Elephant 6 Recording Company is a loosely defined indie rock musical collective from the United States. Notable bands associated with the collective include the Apples in Stereo, Beulah, Circulatory System, Elf Power, the Minders, Neutral Milk Hotel, of Montreal, and The Olivia Tremor Control. In total the collective contains 56 different bands, despite overlap between members. Although bands in Elephant 6 explore many different genres, they have a shared interest in psychedelic pop of the 1960s, with particular influence from bands such as the Beach Boys, the Beatles, and the Zombies. Their music sometimes features intentionally low fidelity production and experimental recording techniques.

The collective started in Ruston, Louisiana in the late 1980s. The name was occasionally used to denote the home recordings made by four high school friends: Bill Doss, Will Cullen Hart, Jeff Mangum, and Robert Schneider. After high school, Schneider formed the Apples in Stereo; Doss, Hart, and Mangum formed the Olivia Tremor Control; and Mangum independently formed Neutral Milk Hotel. These three bands would serve as the basis for Elephant 6, and soon, many other bands joined. Athens, Georgia, and Denver, Colorado, became major hub cities, and the mid-to-late 1990s represented the peak years of activity for the collective.

Due to the confluence of new bands and the dissolution of Neutral Milk Hotel and the Olivia Tremor Control, the collective stagnated in activity in the early 2000s. A brief resurgence in the late 2000s ended with the death of Doss, and in recent years the collective has remained relatively dormant. Journalists have described Elephant 6 as an important underground music movement, and a key contributor to the emergence of alternative rock and indie rock in the 1990s.

== History ==
=== Background and formation ===
Noel Murray and Marcus Gilmer of The A.V. Club note the difficulty in defining the exact parameters of the collective due to the multitude of associated acts. Each act has their own unique sound, and musicians are often members of multiple bands. This problem is compounded by the fact that members will sometimes obfuscate the truth, such as misleading a Rolling Stone reporter into believing they lived in a communal compound in Athens. In 2012, the official Elephant 6 website read: "A collective, a label ... a cult? Elephant 6 may be all of these things or none of these depending on your point of view. And we're certainly not going to try to define what it is now!"

Elephant 6 originated in Ruston, Louisiana, in the late 1980s. The name was occasionally used to denote home recordings made by four high school friends: Bill Doss, Will Cullen Hart, Jeff Mangum, and Robert Schneider. These recordings were circulated between the four of them, and they did not seek approval from record labels or fanzines. Musician Laura Carter said: "They were just 13-year-old boys yelling, 'Fuck your mama,' and bashing on the drums as hard as they can. It was just kids having fun, and they would fill up a whole cassette tape with this." When the group decided to create an imaginary label for their music, Hart came up with the name Elephant 6.

When the four friends graduated high school, they dispersed to different cities in the United States, but continued to mail tapes to each other. Schneider moved to Denver, Colorado and formed a band called the Apples in 1992 with Jim McIntyre, Hilarie Sidney and Chris Parfitt. Doss, Hart, and Mangum moved to Athens, Georgia. The three were drawn to the city's burgeoning music scene, and played in a band called the Synthetic Flying Machine. While in Athens, the group began collaborating with New York musician Julian Koster. In 1993, the Synthetic Flying Machine evolved into a band called the Olivia Tremor Control, and the band gained local attention for their psychedelic sound, which was in contrast to the prevalent grunge sound of the 1990s.

In the 1990s, bands joined Elephant 6 through invitation. Inspired by the Surrealist Manifestos, members of the collective issued their own manifesto in small hand-drawn catalogs, found within early releases. According to Schneider: "We wanted [to find] these little pockets of people in different cities who listened to Pavement and the Beach Boys and were recording on 4-tracks." Schneider notes that another way a band may join is by simply having a similar sound. He uses Beulah as an example, and in reference to the band's sound, he said: "This is a kindred spirit. This is Elephant 6."

Schneider created a record label called the Elephant 6 Recording Company as a vehicle for the Apples' music, and in 1993, the first recording released on the label was an extended play titled Tidal Wave. Around this time, Mangum left the Olivia Tremor Control, and became a vagabond. While living in Seattle, Mangum released the song "Everything Is" on Cher Doll Records in 1994, and was the first member of the collective to have their music released on a mainstream label, although the release was not directly affiliated with the Elephant 6 collective and did not feature the Elephant 6 logo. Mangum released the song under the name Neutral Milk Hotel. The Apples were later known as the Apples in Stereo.

=== Peak years ===
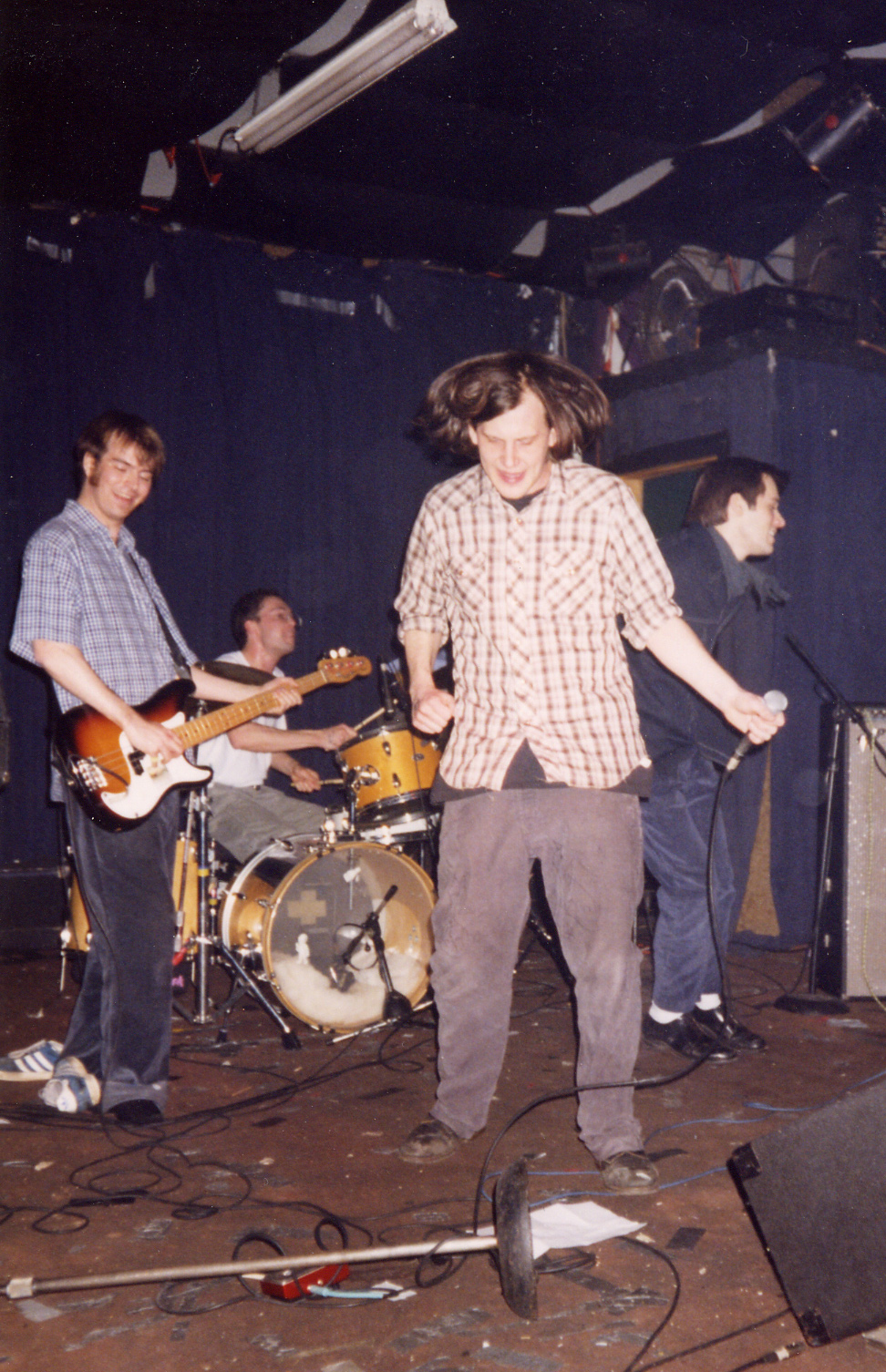
Jeff Mangum (front), Kevin Barnes (right) and the Late B.P. Helium (left) performing with Elf Power in 1997

The mid-to-late 1990s saw the greatest amount of activity for the collective. The three main bands associated with Elephant 6 at the time—the Apples in Stereo, the Olivia Tremor Control, and Neutral Milk Hotel—grew in popularity, and each respectively released a notable album: Fun Trick Noisemaker, Music from the Unrealized Film Script: Dusk at Cubist Castle, and In the Aeroplane Over the Sea. The A.V. Club wrote highly of In the Aeroplane Over the Sea, saying it "is the culmination of everything the [Elephant 6] collective was about in the mid-'90s: distinctive, ragged, catchy records ripped straight from their makers' veins."

Many bands associated with the collective were formed during this period, and Athens became a major hub city. Elf Power, of Montreal, and Doss' solo project the Sunshine Fix were among the more notable Athens based groups. of Montreal frontperson Kevin Barnes said: "The heyday, most of the late 1990s, everyone was involved in each others lives, and we would collaborate more, have dinners where everyone would make something." Schneider compares this period to the Summer of Love, and said the driving force for many of the bands was "out-weirding [their] neighbor" with their music. Elephant 6 bands would tour with each other, the larger bands allowing the smaller bands to open for them.

Denver was the smaller of the two hub cities. In addition to the Apples in Stereo, the major bands from Denver were the Minders, Dressy Bessy, and McIntyre's solo project Von Hemmling. The main draw for Elephant 6 bands in Denver was Pet Sounds Studio, a recording studio Schneider built in McIntyre's house. Many Elephant 6 albums were recorded at Pet Sounds, and were produced by Schneider. In addition to the two main hub cities, Elephant 6 bands began forming in various cities in the United States, such as the Essex Green and the Ladybug Transistor in Brooklyn, and Beulah in San Francisco.

=== Inactivity ===
In the early 2000s, Elephant 6 stagnated in activity. Neutral Milk Hotel member and the Gerbils frontman Scott Spillane identifies the sudden uptick of bands across the country as an important factor to this period. "At the time the Elephant 6 thing was getting out of hand, and we started seeing all of these bands that had little Elephant 6 logos on them all over the place" said Spillane. Bands began to tour more often, and the members had less time to interact with each other. Additionally, Neutral Milk Hotel and the Olivia Tremor Control went on hiatus. Mangum became reclusive as he struggled to cope with his newfound stardom, while the members of the Olivia Tremor Control wanted to record their own solo music.

Beulah member Pat Noel said many bands were dismayed at how journalists would "pigeonhole" them to the collective. "We kind of made a conscious decision to distance ourselves a little bit from the whole thing." Schneider took a break from producing albums and the collective slowly dissipated, although bands like the Apples in Stereo, Elf Power, and of Montreal continued making music throughout the 2000s.

=== Brief reemergence ===
The collective was relatively dormant until the Olivia Tremor Control reunited in 2005 to play the UK music festival All Tomorrow's Parties, curated by Vincent Gallo. The release of the album New Magnetic Wonder by the Apples in Stereo came in 2007. New Magnetic Wonder featured all four of the collective's originating members. While recording the album, they discussed new ideas, which in turn facilitated a need to make more music. The following year, the collective organized the "Elephant 6 Holiday Surprise Tour," a short concert tour that featured fifteen artists and ten Elephant 6 bands. Koster said "Elephant 6 is back," and added: "Somehow, everything's happening for us now. I don't know why we were ever interrupted, and why all this is happening now. But we're all just so happy." Jeff Mangum returned to the public eye with solo concerts over the next few years.

On July 30, 2012, Doss died from a reported aneurysm. His death came as a shock to the collective, and stalled nearly all recordings at the time. Schneider said: "I can't say what it means for the Elephant 6 or the Apples ... On a musical level it's too soon to say. I mean, I don't want to say definitively that I don't want to make music again, but on a musical level there's no way to come to terms with the loss." In 2017 Schneider confirmed he was producing unfinished recordings with the remaining members of the Olivia Tremor Control. Today, the Elephant 6 collective still exists, albeit on a much smaller scale. Bands like Elf Power and of Montreal continue to record music, and many bands have moved onto Elephant 6 offshoot labels such as Orange Twin Records and Cloud Recordings.

== Influences and style ==
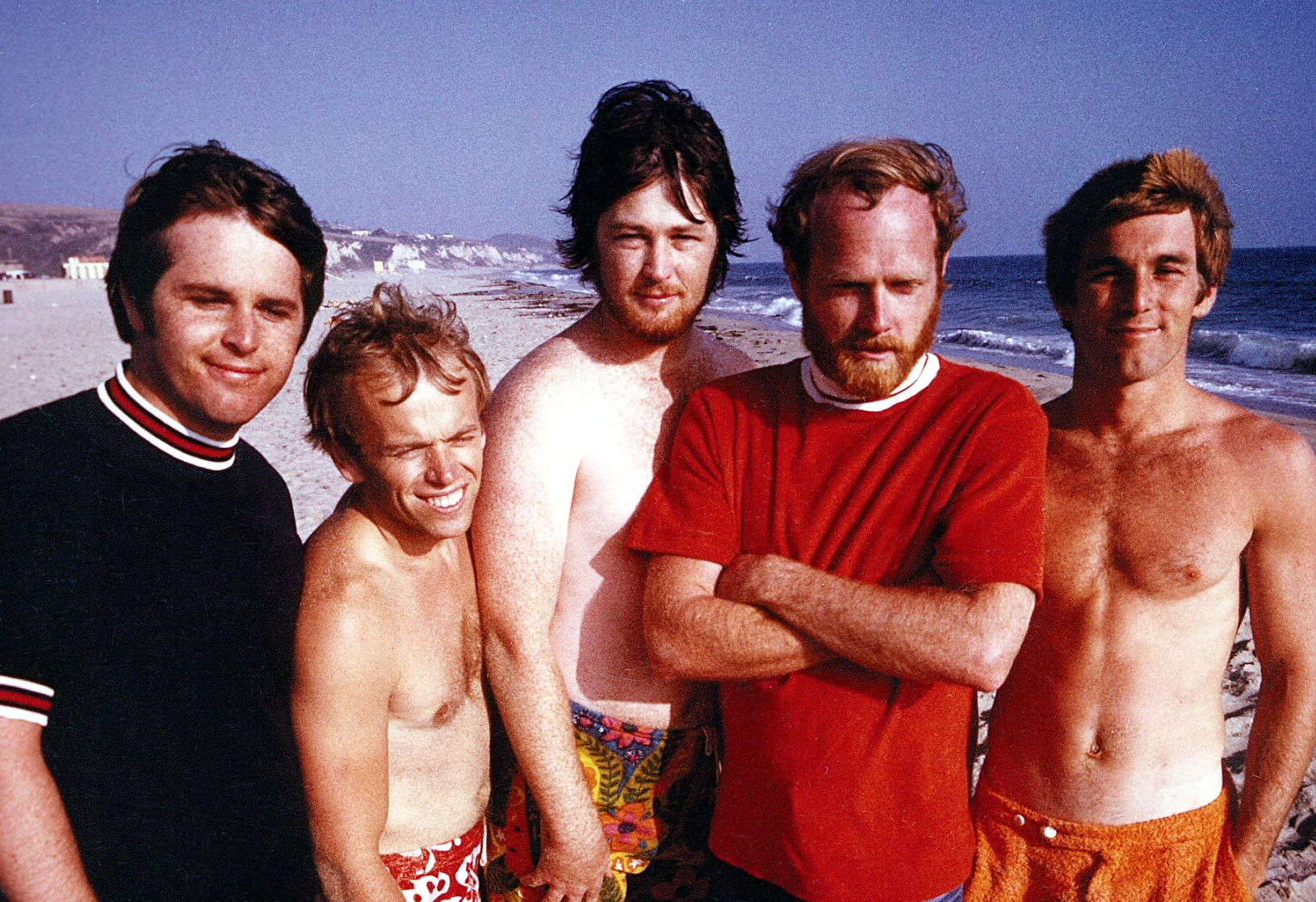
Many Elephant 6 bands were inspired by 1960s psychedelic pop bands, in particular, the Beach Boys (pictured 1967)

Elephant 6 bands explore a variety of music genres, including indie rock, synth-pop, and twee pop. A common interest for nearly every associated band, however, is psychedelic pop of the 1960s. Bands such as the Beach Boys, the Beatles, and the Zombies are important influences for Elephant 6 groups like the Apples in Stereo, Beulah, and the Olivia Tremor Control. Elephant 6's de facto leader Robert Schneider notes the particular influence of the Beach Boys' unfinished album Smile, calling it the "Holy Grail" for many members of the collective. He notes how he and other members were obsessed with Beach Boys albums, and attempted to create the type of music they felt would have been included in Smile.

Most Elephant 6 members are anti-consumerism and possess a DIY ethic. Their music sometimes features intentionally low quality production, and bands may experiment with unique recording methods; for example, Music from the Unrealized Film Script: Dusk at Cubist Castle features recording techniques such as tape manipulation and sound collages. Schneider notes his hatred of both indie music and modern pop music, and said that his vision for Elephant 6 is a "perfect pop world," untarnished by commercial interests.

== Impact ==
Several journalists regard Elephant 6 as an important underground music movement, and a key contributor to the alternative rock and indie rock explosion in the 1990s. Lee M. Shook Jr. of Paste wrote: "The Elephant 6 Recording Company would raise the bar for wide-scale countercultural activity and underground pop art—both musical, visual and otherwise—well into the 21st century." Tom Murphy of Westword expanded on this statement, by writing: "It became a movement of sorts because the music was so accessible and inclusive of a wide range of musical expression, allowing for immediate and enduring growth, however loose the association."

The collective has influenced many indie rock bands, including Arcade Fire, Franz Ferdinand, and Tame Impala. Chris Chu of the Canadian band the Morning Benders said: "Elephant 6 was the gateway for me. They seemed to be bridging that tradition from the 60s to a more modern, more indie approach. It was exactly what I was looking for, a new take on that stuff."

== Documentary ==
In 2022, a documentary about the collective titled The Elephant 6 Recording Co. was released. It was directed by C.B. Stockfleth and produced by Lance Bangs. The film currently has a 100% positive review rate on Rotten Tomatoes.

== Associated acts ==
The official Elephant 6 website lists fifty-two acts associated with the collective.

- Always Red Society
- Thee American Revolution
- Air-Sea Dolphin
- The Apples in Stereo
- Bablicon
- Beulah
- Black Swan Network
- The Cellar Lantern Hymns
- Chocolate USA
- Circulatory System
- Clay Bears
- Dixie Blood Mustache
- Dressy Bessy
- Elf Power
- The Essex Green
- Fablefactory
- The Gerbils
- Giant Day
- Great Lakes
- A Hawk and a Hacksaw
- The High Water Marks
- The Instruments
- Kingsauce
- The Ladybug Transistor
- The Late B.P. Helium
- Little Fyodor
- Major Organ and the Adding Machine
- Marbles
- Marshmallow Coast
- Marta Tennae
- Midget and Hairs
- The Minders
- The Music Tapes
- Nesey Gallons
- Neutral Milk Hotel
- of Montreal
- The Olivia Tremor Control
- Orbiting Human Circus
- Orchestre Fantastique
- The Patient
- Pipes You See, Pipes You Don't
- The Rishis
- Scott Spillane EXP
- Secret Square
- The Sunshine Fix
- Synthetic Flying Machine
- Ulysses
- Thimble Circus
- Vince Mole & his Calcium Orchestra
- Visitations
- Von Hemmling

== Sources ==
- Anon. (n.d.). "Artists". Elephant 6.
- Anon. (April 7, 2009). "Lost Classics: The Elephant 6 Collective". Magnet.
- Anon. (September 21, 2016). "Elephant 6 & Friends Reflect On The Legacy Of The Olivia Tremor Control's Dusk At Cubist Castle". Stereogum.
- Aston, Martin; Beaumont, Mark (March 10, 2011). "From Elephant 6 to Deerhunter: The US's new psychedelia". The Guardian.
- Ballance, Laura; Cook, John; McCaughan, Mac (2009). Our Noise: The Story of Merge Records, the Indie Label That Got Big and Stayed Small. Algonquin Books. ISBN 978-1-5651-2968-9.
- Bloom, Madison (August 19, 2019). "Elephant 6 Documentary Is Out Now ... On VHS". Pitchfork.
- Cannon, Sean (August 19, 2019). "Inside the VHS-Only Documentary About the Most Mysterious Music Collective Ever". The Outline.
- Claymore, Gabriela Tully (June 22, 2017). "The Apples In Stereo's Robert Schneider Working On Unfinished Olivia Tremor Control Recordings". Stereogum.
- Cooper, Kim (2005). In the Aeroplane Over the Sea. 33⅓. Continuum International Publishing Group. ISBN 0-8264-1690-X.
- Dillon, Mark (2012). Fifty Sides of the Beach Boys: The Songs That Tell Their Story. ECW Press. ISBN 978-1-77041-071-8.
- Gilmer, Marcus; Murray, Noel (February 16, 2012). "Elephant 6". The A.V. Club.
- Heater, Brian (June 22, 2006). "I Have Been Floated: An Oral History of the Elephant 6 Collective". PopMatters.
- Heater, Brian (July 31, 2012). "Elephant 6 Recording Company: Crash Course". Spin.
- Hilton, Robin (October 27, 2008). "The Elephant 6 Orchestra In Concert". NPR.
- Murphy, Tom (July 28, 2015). "Elephant 6's Importance to '90s Indie Pop, the Denver Scene and Beyond". Westword.
- Peisner, David (February 22, 2018). "Apples in Stereo's Robert Schneider gave up a flourishing music career to chase his true passion: Math". Atlanta.
- Shook, Lee M. Jr. (October 11, 2013). "Interstellar Pop Underground: A History of the Elephant 6 Collective". Paste.
- Thiessen, Brock (May 22, 2009). "Olivia Tremor Control Back Together and Recording". Exclaim!.
