= Neutral Milk Hotel discography =

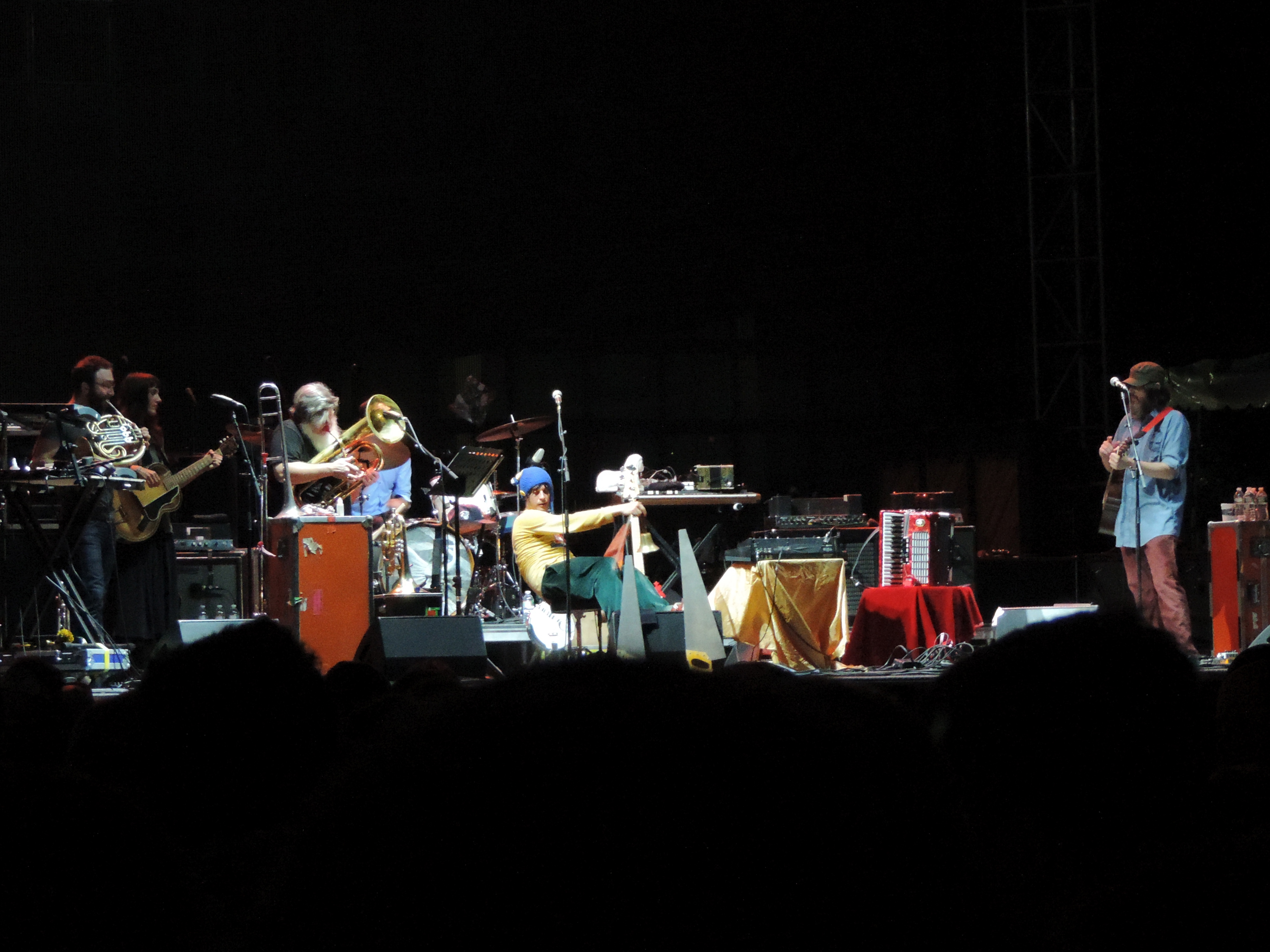
- Neutral Milk Hotel performing in 2014
- Studio albums: 2
- Extended plays: 2
- Singles: 3
- Compilation album: 2

The discography of Neutral Milk Hotel, a Ruston, Louisiana-based indie rock group, consists of two studio albums, two singles, two extended plays, two compilation albums, and three demos.

Neutral Milk Hotel formed in 1989 as an offshoot of Milk, a high school musical project of singer-songwriter Jeff Mangum, and the band was largely a Mangum solo project in the group's earlier days. The group was a part of The Elephant 6 Recording Company, a collective of musicians that includes, among others, notable indie rock bands The Apples in Stereo, The Olivia Tremor Control, and Of Montreal. The 1993 single "Everything Is" was the band's first release, and it would later be reissued as an EP with additional tracks. The band's first studio album, On Avery Island, was released on the independent label Merge, and has sold a relatively high 5,000 copies. Afterwards, the band began to tour for the first time, and grew to include horns player Scott Spillane, multi-instrumentalist Julian Koster, and drummer Jeremy Barnes. In 1998 the band released In the Aeroplane Over the Sea on Merge, an album which has since become one of the most popular and acclaimed indie rock albums of the 1990s. Up until 2011's Ferris Wheel on Fire EP, the band had no new releases since In the Aeroplane Over the Sea, though Mangum has said "I don't know what's going to happen, but I certainly want to make music a bigger part of my life in the future than it has been for the last couple of years."

== Albums ==
=== Studio albums ===
List of albums, with selected chart positions
Title	Album details	Peak chart positions	Sales	Certifications
Title	Album details	US Vinyl	Sales	Certifications
On Avery Island	Released: March 26, 1996 (US); September 30, 1996 (UK); Label: Merge (MRG #103), Fire (Fire #53); Formats: CD, vinyl	—	US: 5,000 +	
In the Aeroplane Over the Sea	Released: February 10, 1998 (US); May 18, 1998 (UK); Label: Merge (MRG #136), Blue Rose (BRRC #10192), Domino (Domino #21); Formats: CD, vinyl	12	US: 393,000	BPI: Silver
"—" denotes a recording that did not chart

=== Compilation albums ===
Title	Album information
Walking Wall of Words	Released: December 12, 2011; Label: Neutral Milk Hotel Records; Formats: vinyl
The Collected Works of Neutral Milk Hotel	Released: February 24, 2023; Label: Merge Records; Formats: vinyl

== Extended plays ==
Title	Album details
Everything Is	Released: 1993; Label: Cher Doll (Cher #002), Fire (Blaze #079), Orange Twin (OTR #005), Neutral Milk Hotel (NMH #001); Formats: 7", 10", CD, digital download
Ferris Wheel on Fire	Released: December 12, 2011; Label: Neutral Milk Hotel Records; Formats: 10", digital download

== Singles ==
Title	Year	Album
"Holland, 1945"	1998	In the Aeroplane Over the Sea
"You've Passed"/"Where You'll Find Me Now"	2011	Walking Wall of Words
"Little Birds"	2011	Walking Wall of Words

== Demos ==
Year	Information	Formats
1990	Beauty (Milk demo): Label: self released	CS
1991	Invent Yourself a Shortcake: Label: The Elephant 6 Recording Company	CS
1992	Beauty: Label: Elephant 6	CS
1993	Hype City Soundtrack: Label: Elephant 6	CS
1993	Unreleased Demo #1	CS
1994	Shannon's Monroe House Demo	CS
1994	Unreleased Demo #2	CS

== Miscellaneous ==
Year	Song	Album	Comments
1993	"Ruby Bulbs"	Those Pre-phylloxera Years	The title is sometimes spelled "Rubby Bulbs" because of someone misspelling it.
1994	"Up and Over"	Amazing Phantom Third Channel	The original version of the song "The King of Carrot Flowers Pt. Three" from In the Aeroplane over the Sea.
1994	"Bucket"	Periscope: Another Yoyo Compilation	Taken from the band's July 1994 Yoyo A Gogo Festival performance.
1995	"Invent Yourself a Shortcake"	Champagne Dancing Party	Taken from an improvisational collaboration with members of Olivia Tremor Control.
1995	"Everything Is"	Appetite For Swag	Originally appeared on "Everything Is"
1996	"Love Me on a Tuesday"	Yo-Yo a Go-Go	The same song as "Tuesday Moon", which appeared on Everything Is, Hype City Soundtrack, and Invent Yourself A Shortcake.
1996	"(Untitled)"	Ptolemaic Terrascope	This track is a different song than the untitled tenth track from In the Aeroplane Over the Sea.
1997	"Glue"	The Basement Tapes, Volume Two: Live Underground	A cover of a song by The Gerbils.
1997	"Naomi"	Audio CD-29	Originally appeared on On Avery Island.
1998	"Everything Is"	I Wouldn't Piss On It If It Was On Fire	Originally appeared on "Everything Is".
1998	"Oh Comely (live)"	More Than You Can Ask Or Imagine	Live version of "Oh Comely" from In the Aeroplane over the Sea recorded at the 1997 Terrastock festival.
1998	"Oh Comely"	9 O'Clock in the Morning	Originally appeared on In the Aeroplane over the Sea.
1999	"Engine"	Oh, Merge: Merge Records 10 Year Anniversary Compilation	Originally appeared on "Holland, 1945".
2000	"In the Aeroplane over the Sea"	Songs for Summer	Originally appeared on In the Aeroplane over the Sea
2002	"Everything Is"	Orange Twin Records Sampler	The compilation also contains two Mangum solo tracks.
2004	"Song Against Sex"	Old Enough to Know Better	Originally appeared on On Avery Island

== Unreleased songs ==
There are several songs which have been written and performed by Neutral Milk Hotel but have not officially released. These include songs that have only been performed live and songs that have appeared on unreleased demo tapes. Mangum stated that he has written songs possibly intended for a future Neutral Milk Hotel release, although these songs went unnamed; the only known song written after In the Aeroplane over the Sea is "Little Birds". The following are titled unreleased songs by Neutral Milk Hotel.

- "Sweet Marie"^{[I]}
- "Love You More Than Life"^{[I]}
- "Candy Coated Dream"^{[I]}
- "Through My Tears"^{[I]}
- "I Hear You Breathe"^{[I]}
- "Random Noise II"^{[I]}
- "Random Noise III"^{[I]}
- "Jennifer"^{[II]}
- "All the Colors of the Rainbow"
- "She Did A Lot of Acid/Beautiful Baby"
- "Worms In The Wind"
- "Goldaline"^{[III]}
- "Now There is Nothing"

- I From the first untitled demo tape. "Candy Coated Dream" has since been released as "Unborn" on the 2011 re-release of "Everything Is".
- II From the second untitled demo tape.
- III Although never released in full, the last verse of "Oh Comely" is taken from "Goldaline".

== See also ==
- The Apples in Stereo discography
- Live at Jittery Joe's
- Orange Twin Field Works: Volume I
