= In the Aeroplane Over the Sea (song) =

Song by Neutral Milk Hotel

from the album In the Aeroplane Over the Sea
- Released: February 10, 1998
- Recorded: July–September 1997
- Studio: Pet Sounds, Denver, Colorado
- Genre: Indie rock; lo-fi; psychedelic folk; noise pop
- Length: 3:22
- Label: Merge
- Songwriter: Jeff Mangum
- Producer: Robert Schneider

"In the Aeroplane Over the Sea" is a song by American indie rock group Neutral Milk Hotel, from their second and final studio album of the same name (1998), released through Merge Records. The track was recorded from July to September, 1997, at Pet Sounds Studio, based in Denver, Colorado. The song was written by lead singer Jeff Mangum, and was produced by fellow Elephant 6 member Robert Schneider. Musically, the song is a psychedelic folk song with elements of indie rock, lo-fi, and noise pop. Ever since its release, the song has been positively received by music critics, some of which praising the song as one of the best songs of all time.

== Background and composition ==
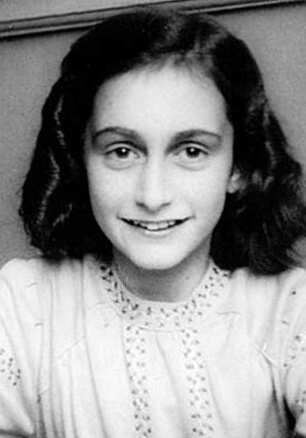
The song, and by extension the album it's from, both references and is inspired by the story of Anne Frank (pictured). Lead singer Jeff Mangum had read her diary before the album's recording.

Bandleader Jeff Mangum wrote the song almost instantaneously while staying in Athens, Georgia with fellow Elephant 6 musicians. The song was written soon after Mangum became romantically involved with Laura Carter. While sitting in the yard of their Athens home, Mangum suddenly announced, "I got a song in my head!" and ran inside the house to play the song for the first time.

The song makes a brief reference to Anne Frank, who is alluded to throughout the album. It is about a young man who realizes that one day he is going to die, and accepts the idea. "In the Aeroplane Over the Sea" is one of the more uplifting songs on the album despite having death as the subject material. Stewart Mason of AllMusic writes, "'In the Aeroplane Over the Sea' is almost giddy at the thought of eternal rest: 'When we meet on a cloud, I'll be laughing out loud' probably isn't the average train of thought of kid barely in his mid-20s, but it certainly beats one of Kurt Cobain's howls of existential despair."

The song opens with double-tracked acoustic guitars, whose "chords are full and serene in contrast to the percussive, bare triads" of King of Carrot Flowers, according to Medium's Joel Settlemoir. Mangum's vocals are accompanied by acoustic guitars, "fuzz" bass work, a singing saw played by Julian Koster, Scott Spillane's flugelhorn, and minimal percussion. The song is in the key of G major, and for the most part follows a simple I–vi–IV–V chord progression. It is in the 6/8 time signature and has an A–A–B1–A–B2–A form.

== Release and reception ==
The song was released as the third track to the band's second and final studio album of the same name on the 10th of February, 1998. In 2000, the song was re-released on the compilation album Songs for Summer. The song was critically praised upon its release. Consequence of Sound ranked it the 28th best song of all time in 2012. Reviewer Dan Caffrey writes, "For me, 'Aeroplane' glides along with an odd sense of ease. It's about how a brief moment of contentment can sometimes outshine a crippling tragedy in one's life." SportsAlcohol.com ranked the song the 89th best of the 1990s. WOXY listed it at No. 359 in its Top 500 Songs of All-Time in 2005. German magazine Musikexpress ranked "In the Aeroplane Over the Sea" as the 141st greatest song in its top 700 list.
