= Lucky Girl =

Lucky Girl may refer to:

== Fictional characters ==
- Gwen Tennyson, also known as Lucky Girl, a character in the Ben 10 franchise
- Lucky Girl, a character in the 2006 Philippine film D' Lucky Ones

== Film and television ==
- "Lucky Girl" (Ben 10), an episode of Ben 10
- Lucky Girl (1932 film), a film starring Gene Gerrard
- Lucky Girl (1989 film), a film nominated for the AACTA Award for Best Short Animation
- Lucky Girl (2001 film), a Canadian film starring Elisha Cuthbert
- Lucky Girl (2015 film), an American television film featuring Gary Anthony Sturgis

== Music ==
=== Albums ===
- Lucky Girl (album), a 2005 album by Katreeya English
- Lucky Girl, a 2000 album by Anne Cochran
- Lucky Girl, a 2006 album by Janelle Jamer

=== Songs ===
- "Lucky Girl", a song by Bettina Bush
- "Lucky Girl", a song by Buddha Sounds
- "Lucky Girl", a song by Camilla and Rebecca Rosso from the soundtrack of the film Legally Blondes
- "Lucky Girl", a song by Catherine Britt
- "Lucky Girl", a song by The Gerbils from The Battle of Electricity
- "Lucky Girl", a song by Gloria Estefan from gloria!
- "Lucky Girl", a song by Jazzanova from Of All the Things
- "Lucky Girl", a song by Joni Mitchell from Dog Eat Dog
- "Lucky Girl", a song by Jonneine Zapata, covered by Stefy on The Orange Album
- "Lucky Girl", a song by Maggie Thrett
- "Lucky Girl", a song by Michelle Williams from Unexpected
- "Lucky Girl", a song by Patti Scialfa from Rumble Doll
- "Lucky Girl", a song by Rival Sons from Before the Fire
- "Lucky Girl", a song by Marianne Faithfull from Faithfull Forever

== Other uses ==
- Lucky Girl, a Finnish sailboat, winner of the bronze medal in the 8 metre class at the 1912 Summer Olympics
- Lucky Girl, a mine in the Bremner Historic Mining District, Alaska, U.S.
- Lucky Girls, a 2003 novel by Nell Freudenberger
