= In the Aeroplane Over the Sea =

Studio album by Neutral Milk Hotel
- Released: February 10, 1998
- Recorded: July–September 1997
- Studios: Pet Sounds, (Note: Listed in the liner notes as Elephant 6 Recording Company) Denver, Colorado
- Genres: Indie rock; psychedelic folk; lo-fi
- Length: 39:55
- Label: Merge
- Producer: Robert Schneider

Neutral Milk Hotel chronology
| On Avery Island (1996) | In the Aeroplane Over the Sea (1998) | Ferris Wheel on Fire (2011) |

Singles from In the Aeroplane Over the Sea
- 1. "Holland, 1945" Released: October 13, 1998

In the Aeroplane Over the Sea is the second and final studio album by the American band Neutral Milk Hotel, released on February 10, 1998, by Merge Records. The album is predominantly indie rock and psychedelic folk and is characterized by extensive use of audio distortion and other lo-fi musical elements. Traditional indie rock instruments like the guitar and drums are paired with less conventional instruments like the singing saw and uilleann pipes. The lyrics are surrealistic and opaque, exploring themes that range from nostalgia to love. An important influence for the album was The Diary of a Young Girl, a book of writings from the diary of Anne Frank.

In the Aeroplane Over the Sea was recorded at Pet Sounds Studio from July to September 1997. Producer Robert Schneider worked with bandleader Jeff Mangum to improve upon the low-quality sound of Neutral Milk Hotel's debut album, On Avery Island. Instead of using standard studio equipment like guitar pedals or effects units to induce distortion, Schneider developed a recording technique that involved heavy compression. To promote the album, Neutral Milk Hotel undertook a tour of North America and Europe, and developed a reputation for chaotic and physically demanding performances.

Contemporary reviews were moderately positive; over time, however, the album developed a cult following. The band became more well known and started touring more, which negatively affected Mangum, whose mental health began to deteriorate. He eventually withdrew from touring, and Neutral Milk Hotel went on hiatus shortly after. In the years since its release, In the Aeroplane Over the Sea has been described by music journalists as both a landmark album for indie rock and as one of the best albums of the 1990s and its critical standing has risen considerably.

== Background ==
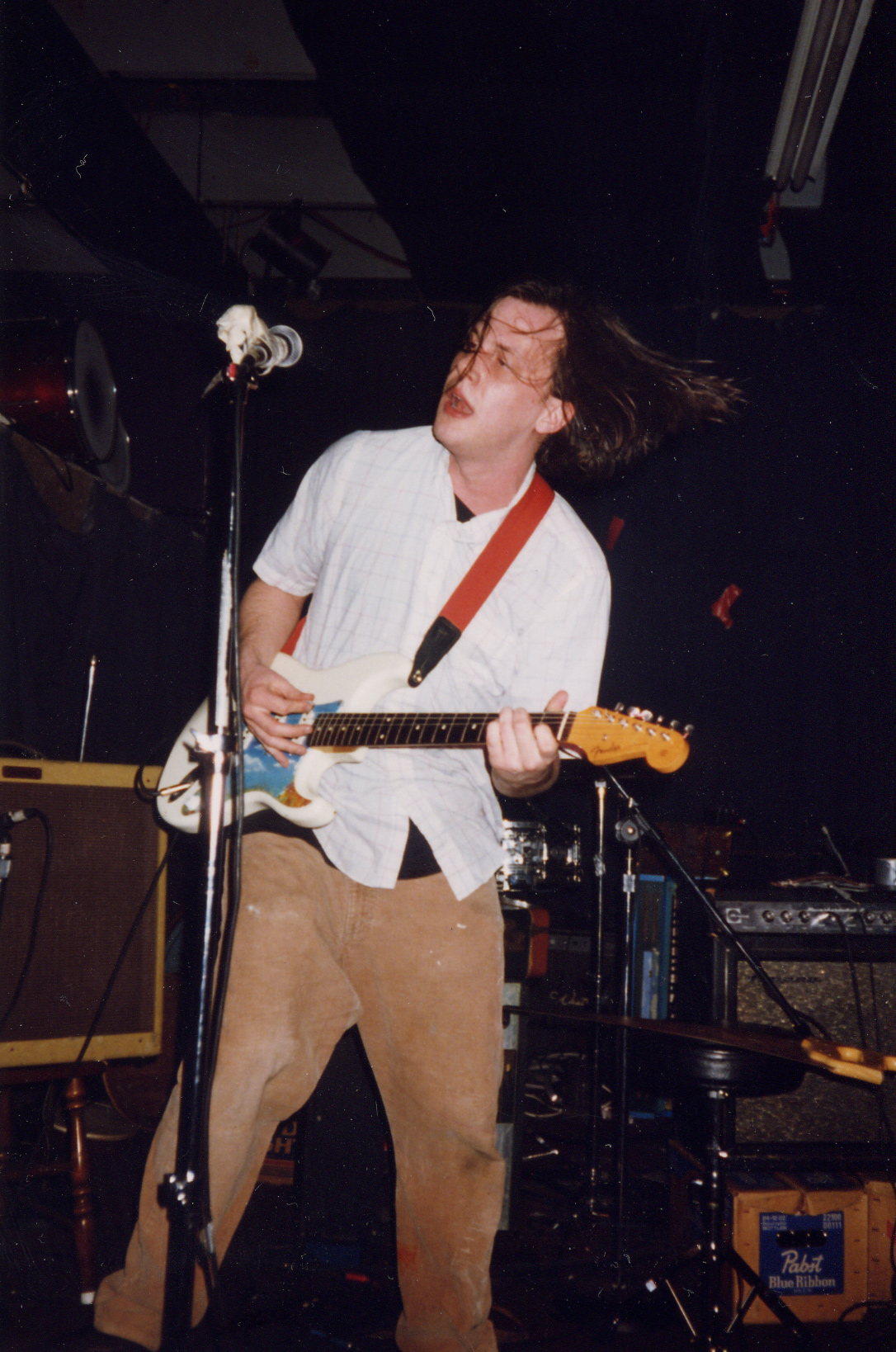
Jeff Mangum performing with Neutral Milk Hotel in 1996

Neutral Milk Hotel originated in Ruston, Louisiana, in the late 1980s, as a home-recording project of high school student Jeff Mangum. Initially called Milk, Mangum shared the recordings he created with his friends and fellow musicians Robert Schneider, Bill Doss, and Will Cullen Hart, and the four began producing music together. The group started branding their respective homemade cassette tapes with "The Elephant 6 Recording Co.", a then-imaginary record label which later grew into a loose musical collective. After graduating from high school, Mangum released the single "Everything Is" on Cher Doll Records under the alias Neutral Milk Hotel. The single's exposure convinced Mangum to record more music under this name. He moved to Denver and worked with Schneider to record the 1996 album On Avery Island. Although Schneider was interested in what he described as "high-art Beatlesque production," he aligned with Mangum's preference for a low-quality sound called lo-fi, admitting that "at first it was frustrating, but I came to enjoy it. That's how I learned to produce, doing that record, because I totally had to let go of what I thought it should be like."

After the release of On Avery Island, Mangum recruited three musicians to tour with: Julian Koster, Jeremy Barnes, and Scott Spillane. The North American tour in support of On Avery Island generated enough money to enable the quartet to move to Athens, Georgia, which was considered a hub for alternative rock and new wave musicians. By mid-1997, Mangum had written and demoed nearly every song for In the Aeroplane Over the Sea. He shared the demos with his bandmates before they moved back to Denver, where Schneider's studio was located, to record the album.

== Recording ==
In the Aeroplane Over the Sea was produced by Robert Schneider, and was recorded from July to September 1997. It was recorded at Pet Sounds Studio in Denver, the home of Schneider's friend Jim McIntyre. Schneider paid half the rent for access to every room in the house except McIntyre's bedroom. The recording sessions for In the Aeroplane Over the Sea coincided with several other sessions. Schneider was already producing the Minders' album Hooray for Tuesday when Neutral Milk Hotel members began to arrive, and decided to halt production until In the Aeroplane Over the Sea was finished. McIntyre was recording the Von Hemmling song "My Country 'Tis of Thee" in his bedroom while the band members played, and whenever Koster was not needed, he would work on songs for his experimental pop music and performance art project the Music Tapes, such as "Television Tells Us" and "Aliens".

Schneider separated the band members into different rooms, but always kept Mangum close to the control room in case he wanted to plug Mangum's acoustic guitar into a four-track cartridge. Schneider occasionally tried using an electric guitar, however he wiped these recordings as he felt that they did not have Mangum's distinctive sound. As the sessions progressed, Schneider wanted to find a way to record the acoustic sound into a microphone instead of into the cartridge. He decided to record the sound through Neumann U 87 microphones. According to Scheider: "[Mangum] liked an acoustic plugged in because he kinda found it fuzzy and raw, like an electric guitar, but it had a strummy quality to it, too ... I had developed an acoustic guitar sound on my own that he was really happy with by the second record, and I think it's really good."

Neutral Milk Hotel biographer Kim Cooper believes In the Aeroplane Over the Sea is one of the most heavily distorted albums ever made, but also notes the lack of equipment such as Big Muffs or distortion pedals. Mangum liked having a layer of distortion over the music, but Schneider decided to not use standard effects equipment. Instead, Schneider used heavy compression and placed a Bellari RP-220 tube preamplifier close to his guitar. Schneider then ran the sound through a mixing console and maximised the sound on a cassette tape. This process was done for nearly every instrument used on In the Aeroplane Over the Sea. Schneider claimed that the nonlinearities of microphone distortion gave the album its unique "warm" quality.

The horn arrangements were primarily written by Schneider. He wrote these parts on a piano or organ, then conferred with trombonist Rick Benjamin to ensure the musical notation was correct. Spillane was the last band member to arrive, so Schneider showed him the arrangements he had already written. The trumpets were written in treble clef, but as Spillane could only read bass clef, he had to rewrite these arrangements before he could learn them. As he did while learning the songs for On Avery Island, Spillane spent hours every day practicing and writing more arrangements in the basement. Toward the end of the recording sessions, Schneider and Spillane worked together to combine their differing arrangements. Schneider's parts were more melancholic while Spillane wrote chaotic and boisterous parts.

== Composition ==
=== Music ===
"In the Aeroplane Over the Sea"
The third track on In the Aeroplane Over the Sea. Similar to many tracks, "In the Aeroplane Over the Sea" employs acoustic chord progressions, multitrack recording, and unique instruments. This track in particular features a singing saw.

In the Aeroplane Over the Sea is difficult to categorize into a specific genre. Critics generally describe it as indie rock and psychedelic folk with a lo-fi sound, but also note the wide range of influences, including Eastern European choral music, Canterbury Sound, circus music, musique concrète, drone music, free jazz, and Tropicália. Jason Ankeny of AllMusic compared the album to a "marching band on an acid trip", while Kim Cooper wrote: "the music is like nothing else in the 90s underground". Part of the musical variance comes from the instruments used on the album. Traditional indie rock instruments like the guitar and drums are paired with less conventional instruments like the shortwave radio, singing saw, and uilleann pipes.

Jeff Mangum's guitars are a key component for much of the album. Mangum often plays simple chord progressions, which Erik Himmelsbach of Spin compared to the '50s progression. Other important aspects to the music include the heavy amount of distortion, as well as the multitrack recording method Schneider used for the majority of the instruments. Ankeny described In the Aeroplane Over the Sea as having a greater emphasis on structure and texture; he further noted that, like On Avery Island, "the songs run continuously together". The overall sound of the album sometimes abruptly shifts from track to track. Rolling Stone noted the range of musical styles present, such as slow funeral marches and fast-paced punk rock. Critic Chris DeVille wrote: "On the musical axis, Neutral Milk Hotel veered from piercingly intimate psychedelic campfire sing-alongs to full-band segments that barreled ahead with haphazard grace."

=== Lyrics ===
Mangum wrote the lyrics for every track on In the Aeroplane Over the Sea. The lyrics are surreal and often reference seemingly unrelated subject matter. Cooper cites the opening track "King of Carrot Flowers, Pt. One" as an example of this style of songwriting. While the lyrics are about childhood fantasies, there are references to sexual awakenings, domestic violence, religious fanaticism, and tarot card readings. Fans and journalists have long argued over the exact meaning of the album. Some listeners believe there is a central message found throughout the lyrics, while other listeners believe the album is too abstract to derive meaning from. DeVille said: "[In the Aeroplane Over the Sea] collides the familiar and the disorienting in a way that renders meaning elusive even as it provokes intense emotional reckoning."

Common lyrical themes include childhood and nostalgia. Pitchfork's Mark Richardson wrote that the lyrics are written with childlike wonder, in which mundane interactions are illustrated as fantastical moments, stating, "It's like a children's book or a fairy tale, Where the Wild Things Are on wax." Mangum's lyrics have also been seen as a depiction of adolescence, and the need to develop one's own identity. Some critics have compared the album to a coming-of-age story. Mangum's descriptions of these experiences evoke a sense of nostalgia. According to Richardson: "it's an album of memories and associations, how skin feels against the grass and what passes through your mind the first time you realize your own powerlessness. It puts ultimate faith in raw feelings, the kind that consume you without logic or sense."

Neutral Milk Hotel, "Ghost"

And she was born in a bottle rocket, 1929
With wings that ringed around a socket
Right between her spine
All drenched in milk and holy water

— Jeff Mangum wrote "Ghost" as a surreal depiction of Anne Frank's life.

Love is another prominent lyrical theme, although this concept takes on different forms. P. J. Sauerteig of PopMatters believes In the Aeroplane Over the Sea's central message is Mangum's longing desire to be loved by the people he idolizes, whether that be a love interest or his peers. The lyrics sometimes seem to describe how Mangum wants to physically merge with the things he loves, which symbolizes a need for interconnectedness with loved ones. Sauerteig cites the track "Two-Headed Boy" as an example of this concept, and states the lyrics are a metaphor for two people who unsuccessfully merged into one body and, as a result, feel like they are trapped in an interdependent relationship.

Although there is little concrete information as to the genesis of some of the lyrics, Mangum has stated a major influence was Anne Frank, a teenage girl who died in a Nazi concentration camp. Before recording On Avery Island, Mangum read The Diary of a Young Girl, a book of writings from Frank's diary that she kept while in hiding during the Nazi occupation of the Netherlands. He was deeply affected by the book and spent, in his own words, "about three days crying", having dreams of traveling back in time and saving her. Tracks such as "Holland, 1945" and "Ghost" incorporate elements of Anne Frank's life into the lyrics. As a result, some listeners have labeled In the Aeroplane Over the Sea as a concept album. However, Frank's importance to the lyrics is a subject of debate. Some critics argue she is merely an inspiration for some of the tracks, as opposed to an important character within a narrative arc. Writing about the Anne Frank connection, Anwen Crawford of The Monthly said: "It would be overly literal ... to describe In the Aeroplane Over the Sea as an album about the Holocaust, for Frank is only one of many phantasms to populate a set of looping, interlinked narratives that proceed with the closed logic of a dream or a religious vision."

== Artwork ==
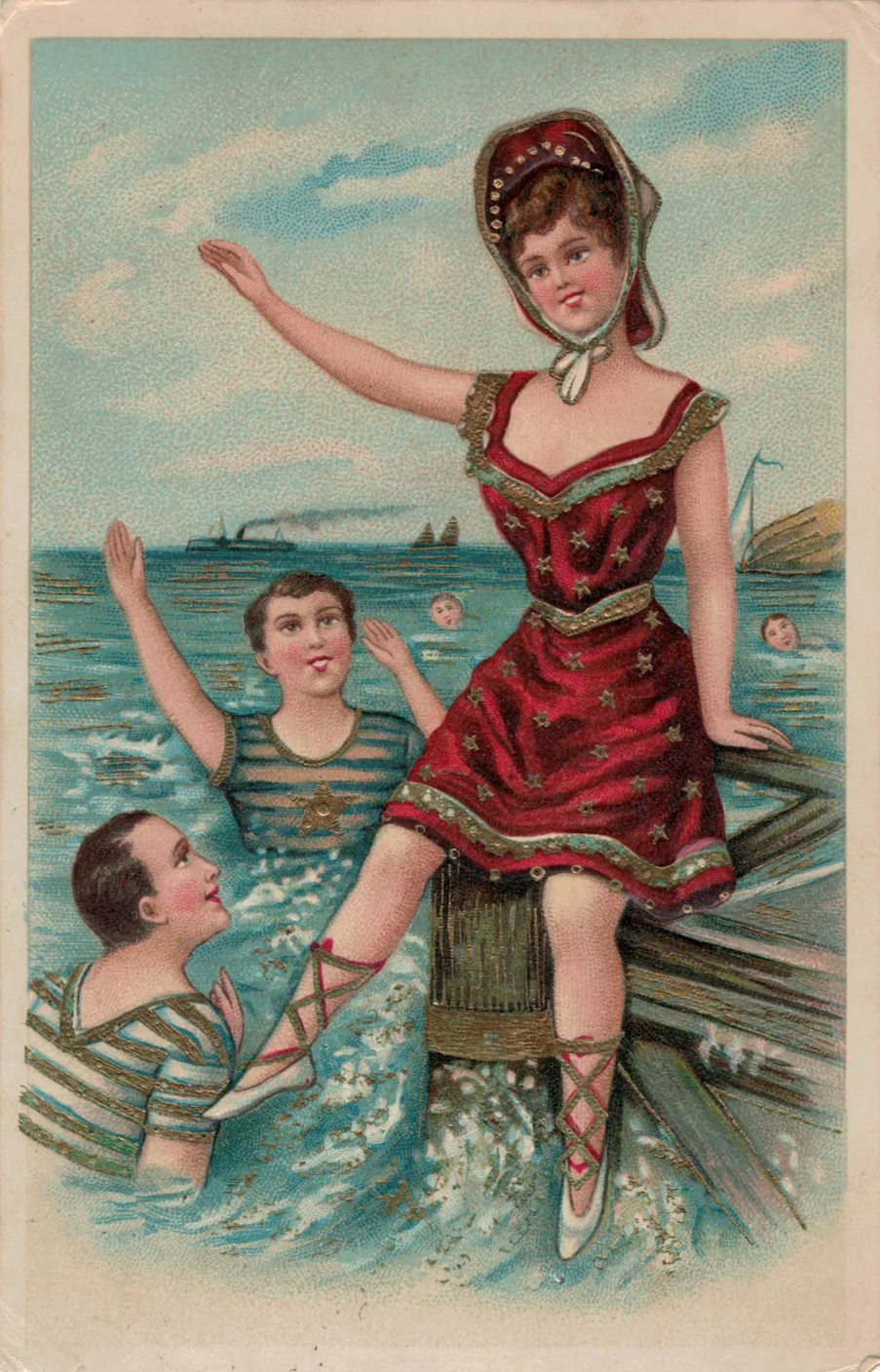
The original postcard Chris Bilheimer edited to create the album cover

The front cover contains a drawing of five bathers out at sea in what is presumed to be the early 1900s. Four are swimming in the water while one, who is wearing a red dress and has a drumhead (Note: The drumhead over the woman's face on the cover is somewhat visually ambiguous and has been commonly perceived as a potato.) instead of a face, sits atop a dock. The back cover shows a drawing of marching band members wearing stilts, led by a short bandmaster. Both illustrations were created by Chris Bilheimer, who at the time was designing artwork for the band R.E.M. Mangum met Bilheimer while living in Athens, and asked him to create the artwork for Neutral Milk Hotel's upcoming album. Mangum was interested in imagery associated with early 20th-century penny arcades, and would often buy postcards from thrift shops that featured this style. One postcard in particular featured bathers at sea, which Bilheimer cropped and slightly altered to form the album cover.

In addition to Bilheimer's drawings, New York multimedia artist Brian Dewan created the interior artwork found within physical copies of In the Aeroplane Over the Sea. Dewan's best-known piece for the album is a black-and-white sketch of a flying phonograph over an industrial plant. Dewan had previously been commissioned by Koster to make the artwork for the Music Tapes demos. When Mangum asked Dewan for artwork, he was provided with two sketches: a magic radio, and a flying phonograph, the latter of which was chosen. To give the disparate drawings a cohesive look, Bilheimer scanned the back of the postcard and overlaid the images over it, which made the drawings look the same age, with an effect of slow decay. Bilheimer then splashed dirt on the album cover just above the female character's outstretched arm.

== Release and tour ==
In the Aeroplane Over the Sea was released in the United States on February 10, 1998, by Merge Records, and in the United Kingdom in May 1998 by The Blue Rose Record Company. Merge pressed 5,500 CD and 1,600 vinyl copies, and expected sales to be similar to On Avery Island, which had sold around 5,000 copies. These initial projections were correct, as the album sold moderately well for the first few months. The song "Holland, 1945" was released as a 7" single on October 13, 1998.

To promote the album, Neutral Milk Hotel embarked on a tour of North America and Europe. Musicians John Fernandes and Will Westbrook were brought on as touring members, and were taught how to play the horn parts with Spillane. For the tour, Mangum wanted the band to learn how to play the Charlie Haden track "Song for Che", a difficult improvisational jazz piece. Although Mangum was expecting a lot out of the newly expanded band, many outsiders noted how caring and nurturing he was toward everyone involved. Filmmaker Lance Bangs said: "He wasn't any kind of a taskmaster—never turning and glaring at anybody—it was never like that. Clearly, there was a love of his circle of friends that made it important for him to build this community and bring them along with him."

While on tour, Neutral Milk Hotel gained a reputation for chaotic and physically demanding concerts. Great Lakes member Ben Crum recalled: "It was definitely dangerous. There often seemed to be a very real chance that someone, probably Julian, would get hurt. Jeff was always doing things like picking him up and throwing him into the drums." The audio technicians for most venues were confused and did not know what to expect. As a result, Laura Carter took on the unusual role of "mix-board translator". According to Carter: "It was more like talking them through what was about to happen, because so much was happening onstage that without someone helping, it was a wail or squeal and the soundman would look at twenty instruments onstage and not know what to dive for."

== Initial reception ==
Professional ratings
Contemporaneous reviews (in 1998)
Review scores
| Source | Rating |
|---|---|
| Chicago Tribune | 2.5/5 stars |
| Entertainment Weekly | B+ |
| NME | 6/10 |
| Pitchfork | 8.7/10 |
| Rolling Stone | 3/5 stars |
| Spin | 7/10 |

Initial critical responses to In the Aeroplane Over the Sea were moderately positive. In Spin, Erik Himmelsbach wrote that Neutral Milk Hotel's psychedelic, folk-infused music had set them apart from the indie-pop sound of fellow Elephant 6 bands the Olivia Tremor Control and the Apples in Stereo. Rob Brunner of Entertainment Weekly praised the "oddball" instrumentation and "bouncy pop melodies", but described some of the acoustic songs as "lifeless acoustic warblers". Pitchfork's M. Christian McDermott also commended the music, which he called a blend of "Sgt. Pepper with early 90s lo-fi" that he found "as catchy as it is frightening". Ben Ratliff of Rolling Stone was more critical of the music. He felt the rhythms and chord changes were boring, while the heavy layer of distortion masked the absence of decent melodies. Ratliff ultimately summarized his review by writing: "Aeroplane is thin-blooded, woolgathering stuff."

The lyrics drew critical attention. Dele Fadele of NME described the lyrics as "evocative" and "compelling". Both Himmelsbach and Ratliff noted the semireligious undertones. Himmelsbach described the lyrics as "darkly comedic and wonderfully wide-eyed", and commended the stream of consciousness style of songwriting. McDermott also discussed the dark lyrics, and wrote: "[Mangum] inherits a world of cannibalism, elastic sexuality and freaks of nature. We can only assume he likes it there."

CMJ New Music Monthly ranked In the Aeroplane Over the Sea as the number one album of 1998, and it placed 15th in the Village Voice's annual Pazz & Jop poll of American music critics. Despite the album's generally positive reception, it was dismissed by critics shortly after its release. In a year-end column accompanying the Pazz & Jop, Robert Christgau dismissed the album as "a funereal jape that gets my goat". In a 2016 article, journalist Luke Winkie said the initial reception was "the standard response to a confusing second album from a band without a preexisting pedigree: distant praise, hedged bets, avoiding the heart at all cost".

== Aftermath ==
=== Breakup and Mangum's reclusion ===
After the album's release, Neutral Milk Hotel's heightened profile had a negative effect on Mangum. In a 2002 interview, Mangum said that "a lot of the basic assumptions [he] held about reality started crumbling". He would sometimes shut himself inside his home for days on end, and hoarded rice in preparation for the possible Y2K problem. Some journalists have speculated he became tired of touring and constantly explaining his lyrics to fans; Elephant 6 biographer Adam Clair believes he may have been overwhelmed by the way fans viewed his music, and the high expectations placed upon any subsequent recordings. Regardless of the reason, Mangum decided that he could not continue performing, and preferred to disappear from the public eye. He did not inform the band, finding it impossible to justify a breakup immediately after their first genuine success, especially since some of them had quit their jobs to join Neutral Milk Hotel. Instead, he avoided the topic of new music altogether and increasingly isolated himself. The situation resulted in the unspoken, unannounced breakup of Neutral Milk Hotel shortly after the tour. The band members remained friends but moved on to other projects. Mangum occasionally worked on music over the next few years—he released Orange Twin Field Works: Volume I, reportedly contributed to the Major Organ and the Adding Machine project, and played as a touring member of Circulatory System in 2001—but kept to himself and released no new songs for Neutral Milk Hotel. He also briefly hosted a program for the freeform radio station WFMU in 2002.

=== Cult following ===
There was no public explanation for the band's sudden breakup. Slate alleged that some fans were angry or accused Mangum of being selfish, and others wrote hoax blog posts giving fake details of upcoming tours and other false information. The large response helped the album gain a cult following, and converted Mangum into a larger-than-life figure. In 2003, Creative Loafing writer Kevin Griffis dedicated a cover story to trying to track down Mangum for personal closure. The search ended when Mangum sent him an email that read: "I'm not an idea. I am a person, who obviously wants to be left alone." Journalist Mark Richardson attempted to explain the album's rise in popularity: "Because [Mangum] was inaccessible, there was no outlet for connection other than the record itself and other fans who shared a passion. By doing nothing, Neutral Milk Hotel developed a cult."

Some journalists have noted the release of In the Aeroplane Over the Sea coincided with the rise of the Internet. The album, and by extension Neutral Milk Hotel, became common fixtures on online message boards, and early music websites like Pitchfork gave the band an increased level of promotion. Winkie wrote: "Would Aeroplane occupy the same untouchable place in American indie-rock culture if it was released in 1992? Or 1987? It's hard to say. The internet has a one-of-a-kind relationship with Neutral Milk Hotel." Memes about In the Aeroplane Over the Sea proliferated on websites like 4chan, reflecting a wave of "hipster" listeners who first discovered the album online, long after the band had broken up.

=== Critical reevaluation and sales ===
Professional ratings
Retrospective reviews (after 1998)
Review scores
| Source | Rating |
|---|---|
| AllMusic | 5/5 stars |
| Christgau's Consumer Guide | (neither) |
| Encyclopedia of Popular Music | 5/5 stars |
| God Is in the TV | 5/5 |
| Pitchfork | 10/10 |
| The Rolling Stone Album Guide | (Note: The 2004 edition of The Rolling Stone Album Guide awarded In the Aeroplane Over the Sea four stars out of five. When the contents of the book were ported to Rolling Stone's website, the rating was changed to four and a half stars out of five, although the review remained the same.) |
| Tiny Mix Tapes | 5/5 |

In the Aeroplane Over the Sea's critical standing rose in the years after its release. Mark Richardson of Pitchfork awarded the 2005 reissue a perfect 10/10 score. Richardson said that although he initially found Mangum's infatuation with Anne Frank embarrassing, he grew an appreciation for the lyrics, and called them the album's defining characteristic. He highlighted the surrealistic imagery, and wrote: "It's a record of images, associations, and threads; no single word describes it so well as the beautiful and overused kaleidoscope." In the 2004 edition of The Rolling Stone Album Guide, critic Roni Sarig described the album as "timeless transcendentalist pop steeped in a century of American music, from funeral marches to punk rock. ... Aeroplane is a fragile, creaky, dignified, and ballsy record". Ankeny wrote that: "Neutral Milk Hotel's second album is another quixotic sonic parade; lo-fi yet lush, impenetrable yet wholly accessible". Ankeny also said the lyrics were too abstract to discern meaning. Marvin Lin of Tiny Mix Tapes found it challenging to concisely explain why the album is so great, and ultimately summarized his review with the statement: "As beautiful as it is disturbing, In the Aeroplane Over the Sea is a stunning piece of art that draws you deeper with each listen. Most great art takes time to appreciate, and this album is no exception."

Despite the generally positive critical reevaluation, the album had its detractors. According to Richardson, listeners who dislike the album have often found its lyrics to be awkward, infantile, or disconcerting, and he said Mangum could be perceived as a "privileged dude sharing naive stoner wisdom". Grantland writer Steven Hyden, once an admirer of the album, felt his appreciation diminish over time, which he ascribed in part to the gradual loss of its original mystique. Just as the album itself became a meme, the tendency to lavish it with hyperbolic praise also became an online in-joke, exemplified by a 2015 headline from the satirical website ClickHole: "Disgusting: ISIS Just Released a 2-Star Review of In the Aeroplane Over the Sea".

Despite modest sales projections and never charting on the Billboard 200, In the Aeroplane Over the Sea had sold over 393,000 copies by 2013, with reported sales of 25,000 copies a year as noted by Slate in 2008. In the Aeroplane Over the Sea was the sixth-best-selling vinyl record of 2008, and its sales helped contribute to a revitalization of vinyl in the late 2000s. The 33⅓ book about In the Aeroplane Over the Sea by author Kim Cooper similarly shares large sales numbers, as it is the second-best-selling entry in the series.

Several websites and magazines have ranked In the Aeroplane Over the Sea as one of the greatest indie rock albums of all time, including Blender and Entertainment Weekly. Some outlets have also ranked it as one of the best albums of the 1990s. Pitchfork initially ranked it at number eighty-five on its list of the best albums of the 1990s, but moved the album to number four in its 2003 revised list. Paste similarly ranked it highly, placing it at number two, behind Radiohead's OK Computer. Other websites that placed In the Aeroplane Over the Sea in their list of the best albums of the 1990s include Cleveland.com (number twenty) and Slant Magazine (number forty-three). Spin in 2005 and Q in 2010 placed In the Aeroplane Over the Sea on their lists of the best albums of the previous twenty-five and thirty years respectively, while Rolling Stone and NME ranked it at 376 and 98 on their lists of the 500 greatest albums of all time respectively.

In the Aeroplane Over the Sea has been highly influential. According to Pitchfork contributor Mike McGonigal, In the Aeroplane Over the Sea's disparate genres laid the groundwork for a musical template followed by bands such as Bright Eyes and Six Organs of Admittance. Mangum's vocals influenced singers such as Colin Meloy of the Decemberists and Zach Condon of Beirut. Arcade Fire frontman Win Butler said In the Aeroplane Over the Sea was a contributing factor to their signing with Merge Records. On the album's tenth anniversary, Pitchfork published an article in which indie musicians such as Dan Snaith, Tim Kasher, and fellow Elephant 6 member Kevin Barnes discussed its importance. Snaith said:

It's an album people want to keep for themselves—sharing it with only those closest to them. The way it has become a quintessential cult album—widely loved as well as widely unknown—makes it easy to believe there's something special between you and it—that it's yours alone no matter how many people love it.

== Track listing ==
All tracks are written by Jeff Mangum, except where noted; horn arrangements by Robert Schneider and Scott Spillane.

| No. | Title | Writer(s) | Length |
|---|---|---|---|
| 1. | "The King of Carrot Flowers, Pt. One" | | 2:00 |
| 2. | "The King of Carrot Flowers, Pts. Two & Three" | Jeremy Barnes, Julian Koster, Mangum, Spillane | 3:06 |
| 3. | "In the Aeroplane Over the Sea" | | 3:22 |
| 4. | "Two-Headed Boy" | | 4:26 |
| 5. | "The Fool" | Spillane | 1:53 |
| 6. | "Holland, 1945" | | 3:15 |
| 7. | "Communist Daughter" | | 1:57 |
| 8. | "Oh Comely" | | 8:18 |
| 9. | "Ghost" | | 4:08 |
| 10. | "[untitled]" | | 2:16 |
| 11. | "Two-Headed Boy, Pt. Two" | | 5:13 |
| Total length: | | | 39:55 |

== Personnel ==
Credits adapted from the liner notes of In the Aeroplane Over the Sea.

Neutral Milk Hotel

- Jeff Mangum – guitar, vocals, organ, floor tom, bowed fuzz bass, tapes, shortwave radio
- Jeremy Barnes – drums, organ
- Scott Spillane – trumpet, flugelhorn, trombone, euphonium
- Julian Koster – Wandering Genie organ, singing saw, bowed banjo, accordion, white noise

Additional musicians

- Robert Schneider – home organ, air organ, fuzz bass, harmony vocal, one-note piano
- Laura Carter – zanzithophone
- Rick Benjamin – trombone
- Marisa Bissinger – saxophone, flugelhorn
- Michelle Anderson – uilleann pipes

Artwork

- Chris Bilheimer – art direction
- Jeff Mangum – art direction
- Brian Dewan – "Flying Victrola" illustration

== Certifications ==
| Region | Certification | Certified units/sales |
|---|---|---|
| United Kingdom (BPI) | Silver | 60,000^{‡} |
^{‡} Sales+streaming figures based on certification alone.
