= Ferris Wheel on Fire =

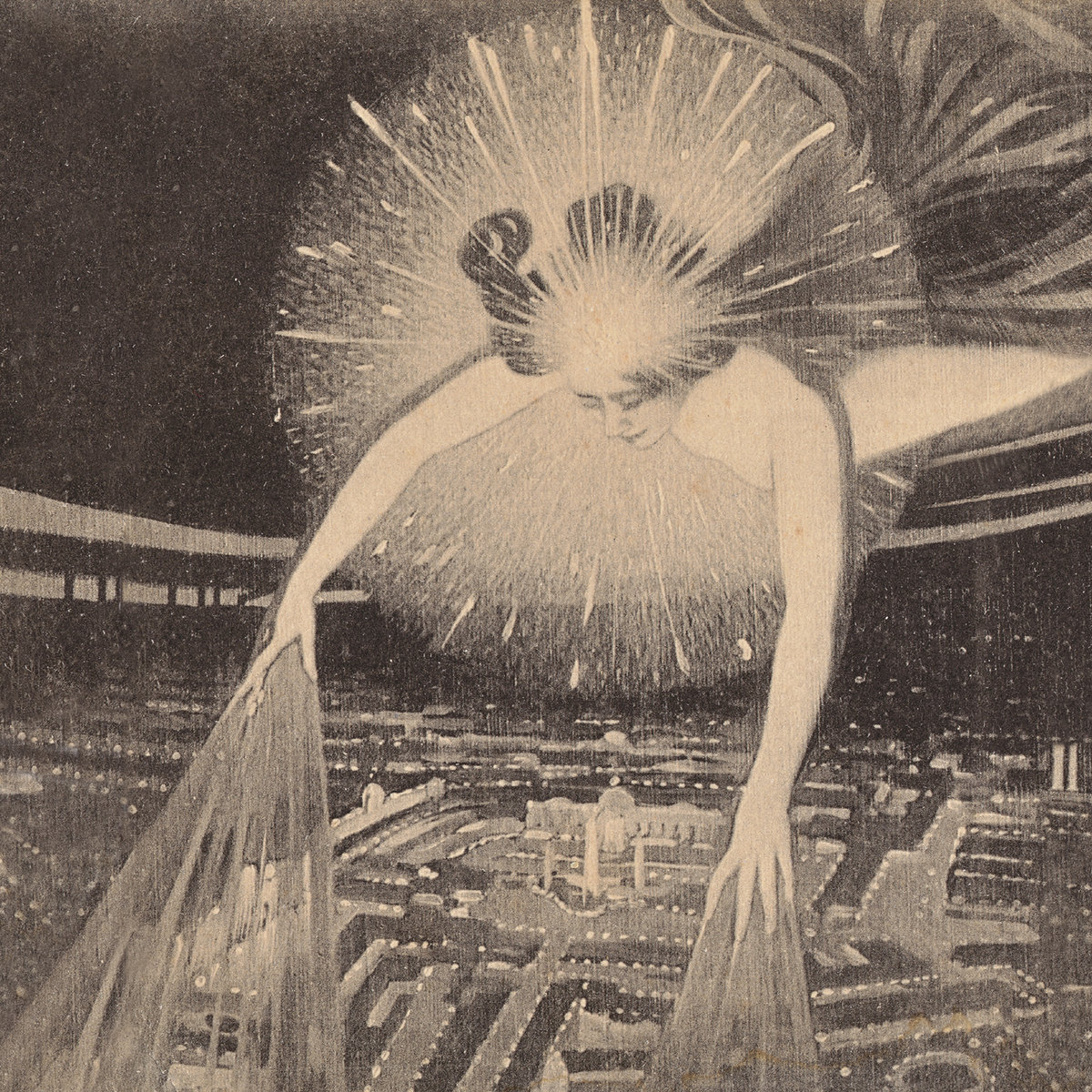

EP by Neutral Milk Hotel
- Released: December 12, 2011
- Recorded: 1996–2010
- Length: 23:46
- Label: Self-released
- Producer: Robert Schneider

Neutral Milk Hotel chronology
In the Aeroplane Over the Sea (1998)	Ferris Wheel on Fire (2011)

Ferris Wheel on Fire is the second EP by the American indie rock band Neutral Milk Hotel, released as part of their Walking Wall of Words vinyl box set. Though not released until December 12, 2011, all the songs were written between 1992 and 1995. Ferris Wheel on Fire includes five songs that up to that point had never been officially released ("Oh Sister", "Ferris Wheel on Fire", "Home", "I Will Bury You in Time", and "My Dream Girl Don't Exist"), two songs originally released on the band's official debut album On Avery Island that were reworked and re-recorded ("April 8th" and "A Baby for Pree / Glow into You"), and one alternative version of a song that was released as the B-side of the "Holland, 1945" single ("Engine"), an outtake from the In the Aeroplane Over the Sea sessions. The EP – together with the "You've Passed/Where You'll Find Me Now" and "Little Birds" singles – marked the first new Neutral Milk Hotel release since 1998. The EP was made available for sale as a digital download from the band's official website in 2019. On February 24, 2023, the EP was released on various streaming services.

== Track listing ==
All tracks are written by Jeff Mangum.

No.	Title	Length
1.	"Oh Sister (1995)"	3:36
2.	"Ferris Wheel on Fire (1993)"	3:46
3.	"Home (1992)"	2:04
4.	"April 8th (1992)"	2:32
5.	"I Will Bury You in Time (1994)"	2:12
6.	"Engine (1993)"	2:55
7.	"A Baby for Pree / Glow into You (1995)"	2:46
8.	"My Dream Girl Don't Exist (Live) (1992)"	3:51
Total length:		23:46

== Personnel ==
Credits adapted from the liner notes of Ferris Wheel on Fire.

Neutral Milk Hotel

- Jeff Mangum – guitar, vocals, album design, back cover collage
- Robert Schneider – melodica (track 3), producer
- Julian Koster – singing saw (track 6)

Technical personnel

- Craig Morris – engineer
- Veronica Trow – producer (exec.)
- Mark Ohe – album design, back cover collage
