= Demo 1 =

Demo 1 may refer to:

== Spaceflight ==
- Crew Dragon Demo-1, or SpaceX Demo-1 or Crew Demo-1, the first orbital test of Dragon 2
- SpaceX COTS Demo Flight 1, the first orbital spaceflight of Dragon
- SSC Demo-1, or Dream Chaser Demo-1, the planned first flight of Dream Chaser

== Music ==
=== Albums ===
- Demo 01, a 2017 EP by Pentagon
- The Demo Album 1, by Stephen Bishop, 2003
- Demo 1, a demo by Pentagram Chile, 1987
- Unreleased Demo #1, a cassette by Neutral Milk Hotel, 1993
- Demo 1, a demo by Inhume, 1995
- Demo 1: 2005, a demo by Diocletian, 2005
- Demo 1, a demo by The Shondes, 2006

=== Songs ===
- "Blacktro (Demo 1)" by Jerome Sydenham and Joe Claussell, on the soundtrack of Kvadrat
