= Everything Is =

Everything Is may refer to:

- Everything Is (album), a 2005 album by Nine Black Alps
- "Everything Is" (song), a 1994 song by Neutral Milk Hotel
