= Holland, 1945 =

Single by Neutral Milk Hotel

from the album In the Aeroplane Over the Sea
- B-side: "Engine"
- Released: October 13, 1998
- Recorded: July 1997
- Studio: Pet Sounds (Note: Listed in the liner notes as Elephant 6 Recording Company) (Denver, Colorado)
- Genre: Indie rock; noise pop
- Length: 6:29
- Label: Blue Rose; Orange Twin; Neutral Milk Hotel Records
- Songwriter: Jeff Mangum
- Producer: Robert Schneider

Neutral Milk Hotel singles chronology
"Everything Is" (1993)	"Holland, 1945" (1998)	"You've Passed/Where You'll Find Me Now" (2011)

"Holland, 1945" is a song by American indie rock band Neutral Milk Hotel. It was released as the only single from the band's second and final studio album In the Aeroplane Over the Sea (1998), through Merge Records. The song was written by lead singer Jeff Mangum and produced by fellow Elephant 6 member Robert Schneider. The track was recorded in July 1997 at Pet Sounds Studio, based in Denver, Colorado. It was released as the lead and sole single to In the Aeroplane Over the Sea on October 13, 1998, through Blue Rose, Orange Twin Records, and Neutral Milk Hotel Records. The song has been positively received by music critics.

== Composition and lyrics ==
"Holland, 1945" is one of the album's louder, more upbeat songs, featuring overdriven and distorted guitars. The song showcases fuzz noise on all of the instruments, a quality created by producer Robert Schneider. "Holland, 1945" was one of the last songs Neutral Milk Hotel frontman Jeff Mangum wrote for In the Aeroplane Over the Sea. It remained untitled until art director Chris Bilheimer asked Mangum what to title the song in the liner notes; when Mangum told him to use either "Holland" or "1945", Bilheimer suggested combining the two.

The song contains references to Anne Frank. In 1945, World War II ended and Anne and her sister Margot died of typhus. The lyric "all when I'd want to keep white roses in their eyes" could be seen as a reference to the White Rose resistance group that existed in Nazi Germany in the early 1940s, though songwriter Jeff Mangum says that he had never heard of the movement before In the Aeroplane Over the Sea was released.

Also referenced in the song is a "dark brother wrapped in white". In the liner notes for the song, Mangum initialed the letters "(h.p.)" after the words "your dark brother". A critic for The Boston Phoenix wrote in 1998 that this "dark brother" was someone who died by suicide, a family member of one of Mangum's close friends.

== Releases ==
The original version of the track was released as the sixth track to the band's second and final studio album, In the Aeroplane Over the Sea, on February 10, 1998. The single version of "Holland, 1945" was released in October 1998 on the Blue Rose Record Company label. It was the second single released by the band, and was the band's last release before a decade-long hiatus and their subsequent reunion in 2011. Orange Twin Records released some un-numbered versions through its website. A rare promo CD was released on October 19, 1998.

The single contains the B-side track "Engine", which was recorded live in Piccadilly Circus tube station. In 2011, the single was re-issued as a 7" picture disc with a fold-out poster and a different live version of "Engine".

== Legacy ==
In 2010, Pitchfork included the song at number 7 on their list of the Top 200 Tracks of the 1990s.

"Holland, 1945" is played during the closing credits of the final episode of The Colbert Report. Slate speculated the song was chosen to pay tribute to host Stephen Colbert's father James William Colbert Jr. and older brothers Peter and Paul, who were killed in the crash of Eastern Air Lines Flight 212, when he was 10 years old. Colbert's emotional connection to the song was noted in an article by Maureen Dowd in The New York Times in 2014.

== Track listing ==
No.	Title	Length
1.	"Holland, 1945"	3:14
2.	"Engine"	3:15
Total length:		6:29

== Personnel ==
Credits adapted from the single's liner notes.

=== Neutral Milk Hotel ===
- Jeff Mangum – vocals, guitar, bowed fuzz bass, cover design
- Jeremy Barnes – drums, organ
- Scott Spillane – trumpet, euphonium
- Julian Koster – singing saw

=== Additional musicians ===
- Rick Benjamin – trombone
- Marisa Bissinger – saxophone
- Michelle Anderson – Uilleann pipes

=== Technical personnel ===
- Robert Schneider – producer on "Holland, 1945"
- Laura Carter – cover design, producer on "Engine" (1998 release)
- Isaac McCalla – mastering on "Holland, 1945"
