= Christmas in Stereo =

Compilation album by Various Artists
- Released: 1997
- Genre: Christmas music, Christmas rock
- Length: 54:50
- Label: Kindercore

Christmas in Stereo is a 1997 Christmas album featuring various indie rock bands. Each band had only two weeks to write their song.

A follow-up compilation, Christmas Two, was released in 1999.

== Track listing ==
1. Autumn Teen Sound - Christmas Wish – 2:36
2. My First Keyboard - Christmas Is Only Good If You Are a Girl (Boy) – 2:02
3. The Catskills - Christmas (Baby Please Come Home) – 2:35
4. Glacier Park - Candy, Toys, And Snow – 1:55
5. Kincaid - White Christmas – 2:54
6. Of Montreal - My Favorite Christmas (In a Hundred Words or Less) – 2:55
7. Sky Mic- Pierced by a Stranger's Heart – 4:50
8. Mendoza Line - Mairie d'Ivry – 2:24
9. Aden - Silent Night – 1:59
10. Teacups - Heritage Heights – 4:23
11. Gritty Kitty - Why They Chose the North Pole – 3:22
12. Bunnygrunt - I Am Gonna Be Warm This Winter – 2:03
13. Masters of the Hemisphere - The First Noel – 2:25
14. The Star Room Boys - (That's How I Know) It's Christmas Time – 3:29
15. The Snowsuit Sound - Merry Christmas, Baby – 2:52
16. Summer Hymns - Santa Couldn't Fit You Under My Christmas Tree – 2:57
17. Major Organ and the Adding Machine - What a Wonderful World – 2:06
18. The Marble Index - The Calendar Year – 2:45
19. The Olivia Tremor Control - Christmas With William S. – 2:53
20. Kindercore Records - Merry Christmas In Stereo – 1:14
