= Live at Jittery Joe's =

Live album by Jeff Mangum
- Released: August 28, 2001
- Recorded: March 7, 1997
- Venues: Jittery Joe's, Athens, GA
- Genres: Indie rock, folk
- Length: 48:16
- Label: Orange Twin Records

Jeff Mangum chronology
Orange Twin Field Works: Volume I (2001)	Live at Jittery Joe's (2001)

Professional ratings
Review scores
Source	Rating
AllMusic	3/5 stars
Pitchfork Media	(7.9/10)

Live at Jittery Joe's is a live album released in 2001 by Jeff Mangum of Neutral Milk Hotel to combat the high prices of bootlegs on eBay. Filmmaker Lance Bangs recorded it at the Athens, GA venue Jittery Joe's on March 7, 1997, during a live solo performance; this location was the original Jittery Joe's at 243 W. Washington St., not one of the current locations. Jeff had not prepared a setlist, so some of the songs were chosen by the audience. A noisy child can be heard throughout the performance (most notably during "Oh Comely").

Most of the songs included on this album had studio versions on earlier Neutral Milk Hotel releases, except for a cover of Phil Spector's "I Love How You Love Me." This album contains a different, earlier version of "Two-Headed Boy, Pt. Two" than appears on In the Aeroplane Over the Sea. The performance is also noteworthy for being the public debut of "Oh Comely." The CD version has a QuickTime video of the performance on the enhanced section.

== Track listing ==
No.	Title	Length
1.	"Introduction"	0:26
2.	"A Baby for Pree/Glow into You"	3:50
3.	"Two-Headed Boy"	5:40
4.	"I Will Bury You in Time"	2:51
5.	"Gardenhead/Leave Me Alone"	3:44
6.	"Two-Headed Boy, Pt. Two"	5:37
7.	"I Love How You Love Me" (Phil Spector)	3:26
8.	"Engine"	5:13
9.	"Naomi"	5:19
10.	"Jesus Christ (Note: The tracks "Jesus Christ" and "Up and Over We Go" are both featured on In the Aeroplane Over the Sea from Neutral Milk Hotel, except having different names (they are sonically the same featured on the album). Both tracks are from the song "The King of Carrot Flowers, Pts. Two & Three" with the set list splitting the parts two and three into individual tracks.)"	1:25
11.	"Up and Over We Go"	2:52
12.	"Oh Comely"	7:56

== Personnel ==
- Jeff Mangum - vocals, acoustic guitar
