= Are You Sleepy? =

Studio album by The Gerbils
- Released: June 24, 1998
- Genre: Indie pop
- Length: 36:38
- Label: Hidden Agenda; AHA!006
- Producer: The Gerbils, Bill Doss

The Gerbils chronology
Are You Sleepy? (1998)	The Battle of Electricity (2001)

Professional ratings
Review scores
Source	Rating
Allmusic	4.0/5 stars
Pitchfork	8.1/10

Are You Sleepy? is the debut album of The Gerbils.

== Track listing ==
No.	Title	Length
1.	"Sunshine Soul"	2:38
2.	"Is She Fiona"	2:56
3.	"Crayon Box"	3:00
4.	"Penny Waits"	2:18
5.	"Fluid"	2:53
6.	"Wet Host"	5:29
7.	"Glue"	4:24
8.	"Ted Doesn't Mind"	2:24
9.	"Walnuts"	2:28
10.	"Lead"	4:50
11.	"Grin"	3:24
Total length:		36:38

== Personnel ==
- Scott Spillane - Vocals, Guitar, Bass
- Will Westbrook - Vocal, Guitars, Crystal Calibrator, Tape Manipulation, Bells
- Jeremy Barnes - Drums, Vocals
- John D'Azzo - Vocals, Guitar, Bass, Piano, Air Organ, Drums
