= You've Passed/Where You'll Find Me Now =

"You've Passed"/"Where You'll Find Me Now"

Single by Neutral Milk Hotel
- Released: December 12, 2011
- Recorded: December 1994 in Ruston, Louisiana
- Genre: Indie rock; lo-fi
- Length: 9:06
- Label: Neutral Milk Hotel Records
- Songwriter: Jeff Mangum
- Producer: Jeff Mangum

Neutral Milk Hotel singles chronology
"Holland, 1945" (1998)	"You've Passed" / "Where You'll Find Me Now" (2011)	"Little Birds" (2011)

You've Passed/Where You'll Find Me Now is the third single by American psychedelic folk band Neutral Milk Hotel, released as part of their Walking Wall of Words vinyl box set on December 12, 2011. The single contains alternative versions of the songs "You've Passed" and "Where You'll Find Me Now", from the band's 1996 album On Avery Island. Both songs were written and performed solely by Jeff Mangum. He recorded both tracks at his father's house in Ruston, Louisiana in December 1994 on cassette tape using a portable four-track recorder. Both tracks, in comparison to their On Avery Island counterparts, are longer and more distorted. The record was engineered by Craig Morris, mixing and mastering was done by friend and long-time collaborator Robert Schneider. The single was made available for sale as a digital download from the band's official website in 2019.

== Track listing ==
All tracks are written by Jeff Mangum.

No.	Title	Length
1.	"You've Passed"	4:26
2.	"Where You'll Find Me Now"	4:39
Total length:		9:05

== Personnel ==
Credits adapted from the single's liner notes.

Neutral Milk Hotel

- Jeff Mangum – voice, guitar, drums, air organ, producer

Technical personnel

- Craig Morris – engineer
- Robert Schneider – mixing, mastering
