= On Avery Island =

- Original vinyl cover; releases on streaming services are cropped, only showing the photograph.

Studio album by Neutral Milk Hotel
- Released: March 26, 1996 (US); September 30, 1996 (UK)
- Recorded: February–May 1995
- Studios: Pet Sounds (Denver, Colorado); Dane Terry and Marisa Bissinger's home
- Genres: Indie rock; psychedelic folk; indie folk; lo-fi; slacker rock
- Length: 47:58
- Labels: Merge (US); Fire (UK)
- Producer: Robert Schneider

Neutral Milk Hotel chronology
Everything Is (1994)	On Avery Island (1996)	In the Aeroplane Over the Sea (1998)

Alternative cover
- 1996 Fire Records (UK) release

On Avery Island is the debut studio album by American rock band Neutral Milk Hotel. It was released in the United States on March 26, 1996, by Merge Records, and in the United Kingdom on September 30, 1996, by Fire Records. At the time, Neutral Milk Hotel was a solo project of American musician Jeff Mangum, who recorded the album with producer Robert Schneider from February to May 1995. On Avery Island is an indie rock and psychedelic folk album, with a lo-fi sound.

== Background and recording ==
Neutral Milk Hotel was formed in Ruston, Louisiana, in the late 1980s, as one of the many home recording projects of musician Jeff Mangum. The simple home recordings Mangum made with his friends Robert Schneider, Bill Doss, and Will Cullen Hart led to the formation of the Elephant 6 musical collective. After graduating from high school, Mangum moved to Seattle, and released the single "Everything Is" on Cher Doll Records, under the alias Neutral Milk Hotel. The single's exposure convinced Mangum to record more music under this name. He moved to Denver, and began working with Schneider to record his first album On Avery Island.

On Avery Island was recorded from February to May 1995, and was produced and engineered by Schneider. According to the album's liner notes, among a number of instrumental credits, Mangum played guitar, drums and vocals, and Schneider played bass, organ, and composed horn arrangements; the horn parts were played by trombonist Rick Benjamin. It was recorded at two different locations: about half of the album was recorded at the house of musicians Dane Terry and Marisa Bissinger, and the other half was recorded at Pet Sounds Studio. The album was recorded on a four-track reel-to-reel.

== Composition ==
On Avery Island is an indie rock and psychedelic folk album with a lo-fi sound. The Rolling Stone Album Guide likened the album's music to other 1990s lo-fi indie rock acts like Smog and Guided by Voices. On Avery Island's most experimental song is the thirteen-minute closing track "Pree-Sisters Swallowing a Donkey's Eye," which is a drone song influenced by gamelan and noise music.

"Naomi" is about Naomi Yang of Galaxie 500 and Damon and Naomi.

== Artwork ==
The cover art for the 1996 release of On Avery Island was designed by Jeff Mangum and Lisa Janssen which is a photo of the Nottingham Goose Fair The United Kingdom release had different cover art, designed by Jill Carnes.

In 2023, the album was rereleased with new cover art.

== Release and reception ==
=== Initial release ===
On Avery Island was released in the United States on March 26, 1996, by Merge Records, and in the United Kingdom on September 30, 1996, by Fire Records. It sold around 5,000 copies, which Merge considered a success. On Avery Island received positive reviews from critics. Kurt Wolff of the Houston Chronicle gave the album four out of five stars, and wrote: "Neutral Milk Hotel's debut is a trippy experience, at times downright crowded with noise. But at the core of every song is a solid, tangible melody, the kind that rings through your brain all day long." Mike Goldsmith of NME gave it an 8/10, and said: "Neutral Milk Hotel can convert miserable-as-sin introspection into folky mantras that bore into your skull like a well-aimed power drill." On Avery Island was ranked at number thirty-five on The Village Voice's Pazz & Jop poll for 1996.

After the release of On Avery Island, Mangum recruited three musicians to tour with: Julian Koster, Jeremy Barnes, and Scott Spillane. On April 28, 1997, Neutral Milk Hotel began a national tour, during which the band members learned to play as a unit. The On Avery Island tour generated enough money for the band members to afford to move to Athens, Georgia, where a large group of Elephant 6 musicians were living. By the spring of 1997, Mangum had written and demoed nearly every song for a second album. He shared the demos with his bandmates before they moved to Denver to record the album In the Aeroplane Over the Sea.

=== Retrospective commentary ===
Professional ratings
Retrospective reviews (after 1996)
Review scores
Source	Rating
AllMusic	4/5 stars
The Guardian	3/5 stars
The Independent	4/5 stars
Pitchfork	8.8/10
The Rolling Stone Album Guide	3.5/5 stars
The Skinny	4/5 stars
Uncut	4/5 stars

Since its release, On Avery Island continued to receive positive reviews. Jason Ankeny of AllMusic described On Avery Island as "a fuzzy masterpiece of experimental lo-fi recording." The Rolling Stone Album Guide noted that despite the production limitations and underdeveloped lyrics, the album succeeds in blending multiple genres into a unique sound. Sasha Geffen of Pitchfork highlighted the songs "You've Passed" and "Gardenhead / Leave Me Alone" as some of the best songs in Neutral Milk Hotel's discography, and wrote: "The abrupt transitions between perfect pop melodies and gaseous balls of noise lend the album a certain wildfire charm."

Retrospective reviews often compare On Avery Island to Neutral Milk Hotel's second album In the Aeroplane Over the Sea. The Guardian's Michael Hann felt On Avery Island was the weaker of the two albums, and wrote: "You can hear Mangum groping towards the realisation of his vision on the likes of 'Song Against Sex' or 'A Baby for Pree,' but never quite finding it." Chris Morgan of Uproxx echoed this remark, and noted that On Avery Island is quieter and less ambitious than its successor. Some critics believe On Avery Island's cacophonous sound and abstract lyrics served as a blueprint for In the Aeroplane Over the Sea. Geffen wrote: "[On Avery Island] offers a glimpse of a pivotal songwriter in transition, moving from making shoddy cassettes for his friends to making art rock that spoke to untold thousands of lonely teens listening to pilfered mp3s late into the night."

In 1998, Neutral Milk Hotel disbanded, and Mangum disappeared from the public eye. Fans were not told why the band disbanded, and the subsequent speculation from online discussions significantly raised their profile. Neutral Milk Hotel and, in particular, In the Aeroplane Over the Sea gained a cult following and converted Mangum into a larger-than-life figure. Some journalists have commented that due to the popularity of In the Aeroplane Over the Sea, other recordings from Neutral Milk Hotel, such as On Avery Island, are often overlooked. Morgan highlighted the discrepancy between the two albums by comparing their Wikipedia articles from 2016. Morgan noted that In the Aeroplane Over the Sea's article was deemed important enough to include a section titled "Legacy", whereas the entire On Avery Island article merely consisted of a few sentences.

== Influence ==
"Marching Theme" influenced Dan Deacon's "When I Was Done Dying", which plays at the end of The Dark Wizard, the HBO docuseries that chronicles the life and death of Dean Potter, an extreme athlete known for free-solo rock climbing, highlining, BASE jumping, and wingsuit flying.

== Track listing ==
All tracks are written by Jeff Mangum, except where noted. Horn arrangements composed by Robert Schneider.

No.	Title	Length
1.	"Song Against Sex"	3:40
2.	"You've Passed"	2:54
3.	"Someone Is Waiting"	2:31
4.	"A Baby for Pree"	1:21
5.	"Marching Theme"	2:58
6.	"Where You'll Find Me Now"	4:04
7.	"Avery Island / April 1st" (Jeff Mangum, Robert Schneider)	1:48
8.	"Gardenhead / Leave Me Alone"	3:14
9.	"Three Peaches"	4:01
10.	"Naomi"	4:53
11.	"April 8th"	2:47
12.	"Pree-Sisters Swallowing a Donkey's Eye"	13:49
Total length:		47:58

On Avery Island – UK edition
No.	Title	Length
13.	" Everything Is..."	3:39
14.	"Snow Song, Pt.1"	3:49

== Personnel ==
Credits adapted from the liner notes of On Avery Island.

- Jeff Mangum – guitar, drums, vocals, bells, xylophone, air organ, keyboards, tapes, cover design
- Robert Schneider – air organs, home organs, fuzz bass, xylophone, horn arrangements
- Lisa Janssen – fuzz bass on tracks 2 and 8, cover design
- Rick Benjamin – trombone on tracks 1, 7, 8

Track 12 features Marisa Bissinger, Hilarie Sidney, Zachary DeMichele, Dane Terry, Lisa Janssen, Aaron Reedy, and Jeff Mangum performing various Indonesian instruments.

== See also ==
- Avery Island (Louisiana)
