= Buddha Sounds =

- Origin: Buenos Aires, Argentina
- Genres: Trip hop, electronic
- Years active: 2002–present
- Label: Music Brokers - PMB
- Members: Alex Seoan; Maia Krasnaia; J. Fernández; Anubis Rha; Kantik; Shankari; Laura Peralta; Yana

Buddha Sounds are an Argentine electronic music group created by producer Alex Seoan in 2002. The band consists of Alex Seoan (guitar, keyboards, samplers and voice); Maia Krasnaia (voice and violin); Jay Fernández (drums); Anubis Rha (bass), Kantik (dancer and vocals), Shankari (dancer and vocals) and Yana (vocals).

Up until now, the band has five studio albums released by the Music Brokers label in Argentina, and by Warner Music in Spain.

Some of Buddha Sounds' screen have made an appearance on the big screen. In 2010, the song 'Odna', from Buddha Sounds' fourth album 'Inner', was included in the movie 'Sex and the City 2', the last film based on the HBO TV show. The same year, 'Xanadu', from 'Buddha Sounds II', appeared in the American/Israeli co-production 'After the Cup: Sons of Sakhnin United'.

Buddha Sounds has performed in Ecuador, Peru, Venezuela, and Argentina.

== Discography ==
- Buddha Sounds I (2002)
1. The Search Is Over [Original Edit] - Eli Kazah
2. Aldalá [Andaluz Mix] - Amira Alaf
3. You Are the Sunshine [Vocal Mix] - Lazy Action
4. Juice [Alex's Remix] - Deep B.
5. Tibet's Sun [Buddha Edit] - Biyaba
6. Return Home [Tee2 Remix] - Eli Kazah
7. Myati [Deep Sounds Edit] - Orleya
8. Mope Okerh [Soviet Remix] - Zoia Vitkovskaia
9. Into the Universe [Eternal Dub Mix] - Freedom Dub feat. Caroline Chrem
10. Kashmir Ju-Ju [Kevin's Abstract Mix] - First Street
11. Sanctis [Paul's Remix] - Le Griser
12. Ishtar [Original Mix] - São Vicente
13. Deep Stuff, Pt. 2 - Mariscal Foch
14. Miracle City [Overground Mix] - Love Reprise
- Buddha Sounds II "The Arabic Dream" (2003)
1. Sinsym Flight [Amanjena Mix] - Meloscience Corp.
2. Please Say Goodbye - Dew
3. Under the Sun [Original Mix] - Orleya
4. All My Dreams - Miss Hansen
5. The Love Supreme - Lila Liu feat. Djamal
6. Xanadu [Mamouinia Edit] - Desert Blend
7. Let Me Go - Eli Kazah
8. Nair - Dew
9. I'm Missing You [Still Missing Remix] - Uschi
10. Flash - Freedom Dub
11. A Special Gift [Mystic Mix] - Love Reprise
12. Why - Seoan
13. On Ledianói - Maia Krasnaia
14. Snow Desert - Speechless Project
15. Far from Paradise [Heaven Voices Mix] - Seoan
16. Out of My Life - Uschi
- Buddha Sounds III "Chill In Tibet" (2003)
1. Beyond This Time [Landscape Mix] - feat. Ahy'o
2. In My World - feat. Dew (Oriental vocals by: Shankari Lasya)
3. If I Love You - feat. Uschi
4. Khandhalha [Alidi Remix] - feat. Amira Alaf
5. If We Are to Survive - feat. Lila Liu
6. All the Same [Tribe Beat Mix] - feat. Ahy'o
7. What Is Right? [Downtempo Remix] - feat. Kantik
8. To Shto Moio - feat. Maia Krasnaia
9. Thinking of You [Vocal Mix] - feat. Lila Liu
10. Eyes Closed - feat. Ahy'o
11. Some Days [Pangean Mix] - feat. Lila Liu
12. Shine One [Original Edit] - feat. Ahy'o
13. I Will Try - feat. Urselle
14. All I Need [Lovin' Mix] - feat. Lila Liu
- Buddha Sounds IV "Inner" (2007)
1. Inner [Rajesh Mix]
2. Don't Blow Away - feat. Ahy'o
3. 14 KMS [Original Mix]
4. The Signs - feat. Uschi
5. Lucecita [Kenko Edit]
6. Mystery Of God - feat. Seoan
7. A Little More Light [Spice Dub] - feat. Ahy'o
8. Dakhenha - feat. Kantik & Shankari Lasya
9. Infralow [Sitartronix] - feat. Ahy'o
10. Research [Andalusi Mix] - feat. Ahy'o
11. Odna - feat. Maia Krasnaia
12. Nag Mandala [Introspective Tàlam]
- Buddha Sounds V "New Mantrams" (2009)
1. Ganesha Sunset - feat. Kantik
2. You Know - feat. Ahy'o
3. Everything You Need [Drum & Dub]
4. Kiss You [Hindi Breaks] - feat. Ahy'o
5. Konark (Melapalayam & Rajesh Mix)
6. Open Your Eyes - feat. Maia Krasnaia
7. Time (Surise Mix) - feat. Ahy'o
8. Vinoba Road (Mantrams Beats)
9. Lucky Girl - feat. Ahy'o
10. Davay - feat. Maia Krasnaia
11. Bhubaneshwar (Rajesh Mix)
12. Ganesha Sunset (Minimal Sound)
- Buddha Sounds VI "Guest in the Universe" (2011)
1. Nederdsza - feat. Mitali Chinara
2. Superficial - feat. Yana
3. Cuando Te Vas - feat. Laura Peralta
4. Don't Forget Me
5. Listen To Me - feat. Seoan & Yana
6. Tonight
7. Funny Lover - feat. Yana & Seoan
8. I See You - feat. Yana
9. My Life - feat. Seoan
10. Wish
11. The Last Meditation
12. Submeditation

== Awards ==
- Buddha Sounds II has won the Gardel Awards on the Best Electronic Music Album category.
- New Mantrams has been nominated for Gardel Awards 2010 on the Best Electronic Music Album category.
