= The Battle of Electricity =

Studio album by The Gerbils
- Released: October 19, 2001
- Recorded: Radium Recording, Athens, GA
- Genre: Indie pop
- Length: 44:24
- Label: Orange Twin; OTR006
- Producer: The Gerbils, Chris Bishop

The Gerbils chronology
Are You Sleepy? (1998)	The Battle of Electricity (2001)

Professional ratings
Review scores
Source	Rating
Allmusic	2.5/5 stars

The Battle of Electricity is the second and final album by Athens-based Elephant 6 band The Gerbils.

== Track listing ==
All tracks by John D'Azzo/Scott Spillane except where noted.

1. "Are You Underwater" (John D'Azzo/J. Kirk Pleasant) – 4:29
2. "(i)" – :48
3. "The Air we Share" – 3:57
4. "Lucky Girl" – 5:21
5. "(ii)" – 1:14
6. "Fail to Mention" – 3:31
7. "(iii)" – :27
8. "Meteoroid From the Sun Strikes a Dead Weirdo" – 2:30
9. "(iv)" – :47
10. "A Song of Love" – 2:52
11. "(v)" – 1:49
12. "The White Sky" – 2:57
13. "(vi)" – :24
14. "(vii)" – 1:48
15. "Snorkel" – 3:10
16. "The Battle of Electricity" – 3:13
17. "Share Again" – 3:46
18. "(viii)" – 1:32

== Personnel ==
- Scott Spillane - Vocals, Guitar, Horns
- Will Westbrook - Guitar, Bass, Vocals
- John D'Azzo - Drums, Vocals
- Jeremy Barnes - Drums
- Kevin Barnes - Vocals
- Bill Doss - Guitar, Vocals
- Peter Erchick - Electric Piano, Accordion
- Eric Harris - Drums
- Christina Hogan - Piano, Oboe, Bassoon
- Heather McIntosh - Cello
- Beth Sale - Vocals
