= Major Organ and the Adding Machine =

US musical group

- Origin: Athens, GA, United States
- Genres: Indie rock, experimental rock, indie pop, experimental pop
- Years active: 1997–present
- Labels: Elephant 6, Orange Twin
- Members: Major Organ; Kevin Barnes; Jeff Mangum; Robert Schneider; Julian Koster

Major Organ and the Adding Machine is an Elephant 6 supergroup led by the elusive and possibly fictional Major Organ. The liner notes of the band's debut album, Major Organ and the Adding Machine, leave it a mystery as to who is officially featured. When performing live on the Holiday Surprise Tour, the members of the band wore paper masks to maintain their anonymity. It is believed that the main contributors are Jeff Mangum, Julian Koster, Robert Schneider, and Kevin Barnes, whose vocals are most obviously present on the album, but a number of other Elephant 6 musicians are believed to have contributed too, including members of The Olivia Tremor Control, Elf Power, and of Montreal.

In 1997, when thought to be a side project of Jeff Mangum and Julian Koster, Major Organ and the Adding Machine contributed a cover of Louis Armstrong's "What a Wonderful World" to a Kindercore Records Christmas compilation. Over the next few years, they recorded a self-titled album and released it on Orange Twin Records in 2001.

A trailer for a Major Organ and the Adding Machine film was shown at the 40 Watt Club on May 5, 2007 and August 11, 2007. The film was premiered on October 7, 2008 and shown at every show on the Holiday Surprise Tour in the following weeks. The film contains no dialogue and is accompanied by alternate arrangements of songs from the Major Organ and the Adding Machine album. An expanded version of the album, including a DVD of the film, was released on September 14, 2010, although some consumers received their copies before the announced release date. The film's credits, as well as the commentary, seemingly confirm the suspected roster of Elephant 6 musicians.

== Discography ==
- Major Organ and the Adding Machine (CD) - Orange Twin - 2001
- Major Organ and the Adding Machine (DVD) - Orange Twin - 2010

The band also submitted a version of "What a Wonderful World" to the Kindercore Records compilation album Christmas in Stereo, released in 1997
