= Orange Twin Field Works: Volume I =

Live album by Jeff Mangum
- Released: June 18, 2001
- Recorded: August 11–13, 2000
- Venue: Koprivshtitsa Festival, Koprivshtitsa, Bulgaria
- Genre: Bulgarian folk; sound collage; world; field recording
- Length: 33:45
- Label: Orange Twin Records

Jeff Mangum chronology
Orange Twin Field Works: Volume I (2001)	Live at Jittery Joe's (2001)

Professional ratings
Review scores
Source	Rating
Pitchfork Media	8.5/10 7/10/2002

Orange Twin Field Works: Volume I or Bulgarian Field Recordings Vol. 1 is a collection of field recordings of Bulgarian folk music released by Jeff Mangum, of Neutral Milk Hotel. The album contains one track, a little over a half-hour of different segments from a single instance of the Koprivshtitsa festival.

== Track listing ==
1. "Field Works" – 33:46
