= The Gerbils =

American indie band

- Origin: Athens, Georgia, U.S.
- Genres: Indie pop
- Years active: 1995–1999, 2001, 2004–2006
- Labels: Hidden Agenda; Orange Twin
- Past members: Scott Spillane; John D'Azzo; Will Westbrook; Jeremy Barnes

The Gerbils were an American indie rock band that formed in Athens, Georgia, United States, in 1998. Part of the Elephant Six Collective, the band released two albums and toured nationwide during their tenure.

== History ==
The band consisted of Scott Spillane, John D'Azzo and Will Westbrook, who were college roommates in Ruston, LA, along with cellist Penny Burbank. They released a couple singles on different independent record labels between 1996 and 1998 before recording Are You Sleepy, (which included the four previously released songs) in 1998 on Hidden Agenda Records.

Spillane's Neutral Milk Hotel bandmate Jeremy Barnes eventually joined as drummer. However, the members of the band soon decided to call it quits unofficially with a farewell show in 1999 in Athens. While D'Azzo pursued interests in California, Spillane and Westbrook (with the help of members of Of Montreal and Elf Power) finished mixing the album that was completed with Chris Bishop prior to their separation. After the album, The Battle of Electricity, was completed, the Gerbils did a national tour with Elf Power before again separating. The band eventually reformed in 2004, playing regularly and becoming fully active.

Guitarist Will Westbrook died on Monday, December 11, 2006, due to an undisclosed illness. After his death, The Gerbils disbanded, with Spillane and D'Azzo occasionally performing Gerbils' songs together afterwards.

== Releases ==
Along with various contributions to compilation albums, the Gerbils have released two albums and three singles on a variety of labels.

=== Albums ===
- Are You Sleepy? (CD/LP) - Hidden Agenda - 1998
- The Battle of Electricity (CD/LP) - Orange Twin - 2001

=== Singles ===
- "Grin"/"Crayon Box" (7") - Spare Me Records - 1996
- "Glue"/"Is She Fiona" (7") - Hidden Agenda - 1997
- "Lucky Girl"/"Big White Limo" - Earworm - 1997
