= Jeff Mangum =

American musician (born 1970)

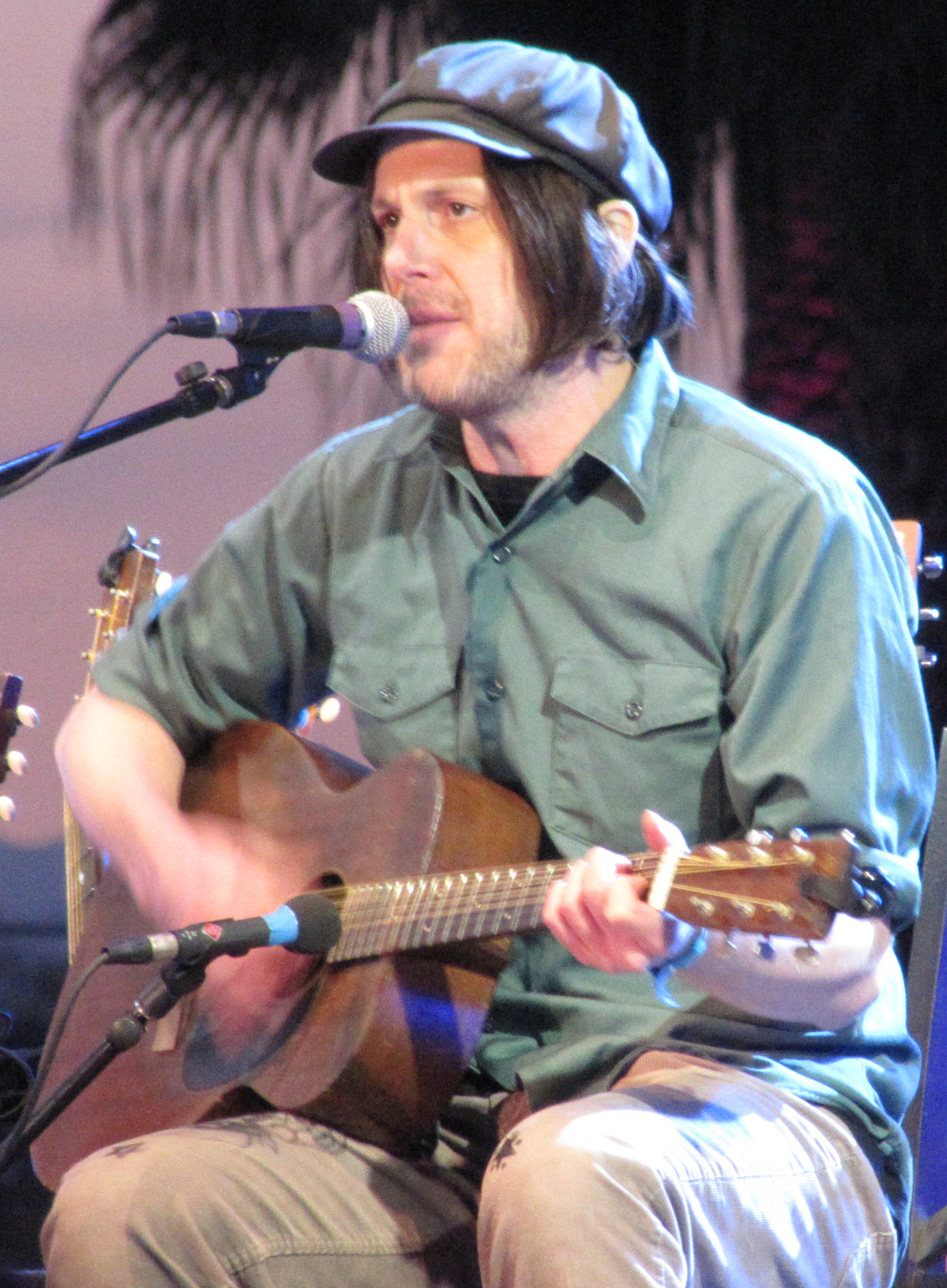
- Mangum performing in 2012

Background information
- Born: Jeffrey Nye Mangum; October 24, 1970 (age 55); Ruston, Louisiana, U.S.
- Genres: Indie rock; psychedelic folk; lo-fi; sound collage; psychedelic pop
- Instruments: Vocals; guitar; drums; bass; keyboards; organ; accordion
- Years active: 1987–1998; 2001–2002; 2006; 2008–2015
- Labels: Merge; Orange Twin
- Formerly of: Neutral Milk Hotel; Circulatory System; The Olivia Tremor Control; The Apples in Stereo; Major Organ and the Adding Machine
- Spouse: Astra Taylor (m. 2005)
- Website: walkingwallofwords.com

Jeffrey Nye Mangum (born October 24, 1970) is an American singer, songwriter, and musician. He gained prominence as the founder, songwriter, vocalist, and guitarist of Neutral Milk Hotel and as a co-founder of The Elephant 6 Recording Company. Mangum is noted for his complex, lyrically dense songwriting, particularly on the album In the Aeroplane Over the Sea.

He is also known for his public image as a recluse, often taking extended breaks from music and maintaining minimal press interaction. A 2008 article in Slate described Mangum as the "Salinger of Indie Rock."

In 2023, Mangum received a Grammy Award nomination for "Best Boxed Or Special Limited Edition Package."

== Recording career ==
=== Early life ===
Mangum was born in Ruston, Louisiana, where he met the other co-founding members of Elephant 6, Robert Schneider, Will Cullen Hart, and Bill Doss. Mangum's father, James Mangum, was a professor of economics at Louisiana Tech University. As teenagers, the boys shared a passion for home recording, influenced by the likes of the Minutemen, John Cage, and 1960s psychedelia. Mangum's earliest musical projects included Maggot (a punk group with Will Hart), Cranberry Lifecycle (an experimental pop project, also with Hart) and Synthetic Flying Machine (which featured Bill Doss). In the early 1990s Mangum, Hart and Doss moved from Ruston to Athens, Georgia and Synthetic Flying Machine evolved into Olivia Tremor Control, led primarily by Hart and Doss. Mangum has contributed vocals, drums and sound effects to many of the Olivia's subsequent recordings, including their debut EP California Demise, released in 1994 on the Elephant 6 Recording Co. imprint.

=== Neutral Milk Hotel ===
Mangum left Athens and travelled around the United States, working on solo four-track tape recordings under the name Milk, which would soon become Neutral Milk Hotel. The earliest Neutral Milk Hotel releases included the Elephant 6 cassette Hype City Soundtrack, and Everything Is, a 7" released by Cher Doll Records. Mangum recorded his debut LP On Avery Island at Robert Schneider's Pet Sounds Studio in Denver, Colorado between 1994 and 1995. The album was released in 1996 on Merge Records in North America and Fire Records in the UK. Following the album's release, Mangum expanded Neutral Milk Hotel to include his friends Scott Spillane, Julian Koster and Jeremy Barnes. The group returned to Denver in 1997 to record In the Aeroplane Over the Sea, which was released the following year and would become one of the most highly acclaimed indie rock albums of all time.

=== After Neutral Milk Hotel ===
Mangum disbanded Neutral Milk Hotel following an extensive tour of North America and Europe, culminating in a solo set on New Year's Eve 1998 at the 40 Watt Club in Athens. Allegedly suffering from poor health, Mangum made few public appearances until February 2001, when he performed a one-off show in New Zealand at the request of Chris Knox. Performing as World of Wild Beards with Knox & then-girlfriend Laura Carter, he reportedly told the audience he hadn't played onstage for three years following a "complete nervous breakdown", and that the visit to New Zealand - in which he serenaded Knox on a camping trip to the Coromandel - was intended to help him put it behind him.

That summer, Mangum released a compilation of field recordings of Bulgarian folk music on Carter's Orange Twin label titled Orange Twin Field Works: Volume I. This was followed by a live solo album Live at Jittery Joe's, recorded by filmmaker Lance Bangs in 1997. In the fall of 2001 he joined Circulatory System and The Instruments on an East Coast tour, providing drums and vocals. While working with the people involved in the Major Organ and the Adding Machine act, a short film by the same name was curated. Mangum contributed to the soundtrack (which is a modified version of the album by the same name) as well as playing several very minor roles in the film.

In February 2002, Mangum was interviewed by Pitchfork where he discussed his emotional response to In The Aeroplane Over The Sea, his recent interest in Buddhism and Eastern thought, travelling across Europe, and working on new field recordings and sound collage pieces (under the name Korena Pang). He also expressed doubt that he would record another Neutral Milk Hotel album, "I just feel like these windows open up for something to be honest, and they don't stay open for very long. I guess my path feels sort of different now".

In the summer and fall of 2002, Mangum hosted several shows on the free-form New Jersey radio station WFMU. His playlists included excerpts from music therapy classes, musique concrète pieces, European folk music, and environmental recordings by Chris Watson. He also played a two-hour drone piece by Tony Conrad, and the entirety of Live at the Village Vanguard Again! by John Coltrane and Rock Bottom by Robert Wyatt. Mangum also debuted a lengthy new sound collage work, entitled "To Animate the Body with the Cocoon of the Her Unconscious Christ the Mother Removes Her Death Body of 1910 Only To Be Reborn in the Same Spirit as a School of Blow Fish Believing in the Coming of the Milk Christ", and credited to The Long Warm Wall of Alfred Snouts.

Mangum regularly contributed vocals, drums and sound effects to a number of Elephant 6-related albums throughout the 2000s. These included Curse Of The Seven Jackals (with Laura Carter, Eric Harris, Chris Jolly & Heather McIntosh), Major Organ and the Adding Machine (with Julian Koster, Kevin Barnes and Will Hart, amongst others), Circulatory System's self-titled debut, Signal Morning and Mosaics Within Mosaics, the Apples in Stereo's New Magnetic Wonder, the Music Tapes' Mary's Voice and Jeremy Barnes' A Hawk and a Hacksaw.

=== Return to live performances ===
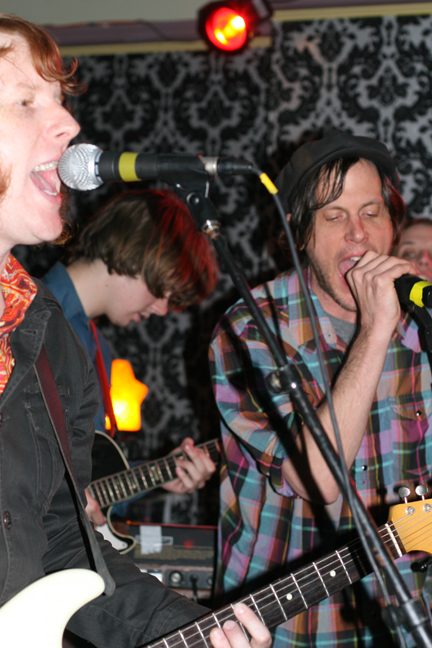
Mangum (right), alongside E6 cohorts Bill Doss (left) and Nesey Gallons (center), performing on the Holiday Surprise Tour, Pittsburgh, 2008

In August 2005, Mangum appeared onstage with the Olivia Tremor Control at New York City's Bowery Ballroom to sing "I Have Been Floated". He made no further public appearances until October 2008, when he took part in the Elephant 6 Holiday Surprise reunion tour, performing the Neutral Milk Hotel song "Engine" at several shows accompanied by Julian Koster on singing saw.

In December 2009, Mangum contributed a cover of "Sign the Dotted Line" to a Chris Knox tribute album titled Stroke: Songs for Chris Knox. This was followed by an appearance at a Knox benefit show on May 6, 2010, at Le Poisson Rouge, where Mangum performed a number of acoustic Neutral Milk Hotel songs. On December 4, 2010, Mangum played an unannounced set at a loft in Bushwick, Brooklyn.

On April 20, 2011, Robert Schneider debuted a score composed by Mangum for the Teletron, a mind-controlled electronic instrument invented by Schneider. In August 2011, Mangum launched the website Walking Wall of Words, through which he self-released a vinyl box set of Neutral Milk Hotel recordings and previously unreleased material. He also curated a series of downloadable 'radio broadcasts' and sold one-of-a-kind drawings, with a portion of proceeds donated to charities including Children of the Blue Sky.

Also in August, Mangum commenced a tour of the East Coast, performing mainly Neutral Milk Hotel songs. On September 30, he played a full set at the All Tomorrow's Parties festival in Asbury Park, NJ. On October 4, he made an appearance at Zuccotti Park in New York City and played several songs to those participating in the Occupy Wall Street protests. In March 2012, he curated the ATP festival in Minehead, England, inviting a number of Elephant 6 groups including The Apples In Stereo, The Music Tapes, Olivia Tremor Control and A Hawk and a Hacksaw. Influential artists such as The Fall, Thurston Moore, Roscoe Mitchell and the Sun Ra Arkestra also performed at the three-day event.

Mangum's solo tour continued throughout 2012 and into 2013, including high-profile appearances at Coachella, Primavera Sound, and the Calgary Folk Music Festival. He was often accompanied by friends and former Neutral Milk Hotel bandmates Koster, Spillane and Barnes onstage. On October 11, 2013, Neutral Milk Hotel performed their first full show in fifteen years at a former Methodist church in Baltimore, MD. An extensive reunion tour was announced for late 2013 through 2014, including shows in Taiwan, Japan, Australia, New Zealand, and throughout North America and Europe. The band's final show of 2014 took place at Fun Fun Fun Fest in Austin, TX, on November 9.

In April 2015, Neutral Milk Hotel embarked upon their "last tour for the foreseeable future" including dates with Dot Wiggin and Circulatory System. Their final show took place at the Phoenix Theater, Petaluma, CA on June 11.

=== As Korena Pang ===
Korena Pang was a name used by Jeff Mangum for his sound collage work, which he debuted during his 2002 show on New Jersey radio station WFMU. The name first appeared in the liner notes to the 1996 Neutral Milk Hotel album On Avery Island, and has been used interchangeably with another pseudonym, Alfred Snouts. Mangum described the process of constructing sound collage pieces during a rare interview with Pitchfork the same year:

"I made a record of montage sounds in '99 under the name Korena Pang, but it was never put out because it didn't do it for me [...] That record was more just a collection of twenty different home recordings, whereas the montage work I'm doing now is like a thousand sounds in one minute. Now I'm able to go out into the world with my field recorder, record sounds, and bring them home to collage on the computer. The raw sounds can really move and come alive that way. I love the idea of a record containing an entire universe; where the sounds span decades of recording from all over the world and all sorts of different sources."

== Personal life ==
On June 9, 2005, Mangum married filmmaker and activist Astra Taylor. Taylor joined Mangum onstage for a number of shows in 2013 and 2014, playing guitar and accordion.

Mangum is vegan, and on October 27, 2011, performed a benefit show at the Woodstock Farm Animal Sanctuary, raising over $16,500.

In September 2019, Mangum and Taylor attended the New York City Climate Strike.

In March 2020, ahead of the US presidential election, Mangum endorsed the presidential campaign of US Senator Bernie Sanders in a message to "his friends" (fans of the band), subsequently shared publicly and co-signed by Taylor.

== Discography ==
=== As Jeff Mangum ===
- Orange Twin Field Works: Volume I (Orange Twin; CD; 2001)
- Live at Jittery Joe's (Orange Twin; CD; 2001)
- Stroke: Songs for Chris Knox compilation, song: "Sign the Dotted Line" (Merge; CD; 2009)

=== As Korena Pang ===
- AUX, Vol. 1 compilation, song: "excerpt from Dogbirthed Brother in Eggsack Delicious" (Ideas for Creative Exploration; CD; 2005)

=== With Neutral Milk Hotel ===
- Hype City Soundtrack (1991)
- Everything Is (1994)
- On Avery Island (1996)
- In the Aeroplane Over the Sea (1998)
- Ferris Wheel on Fire (2011)

=== Major Organ and the Adding Machine ===
- Major Organ and the Adding Machine (2001) (suspected)
