= Neutral Milk Hotel =

American indie rock band

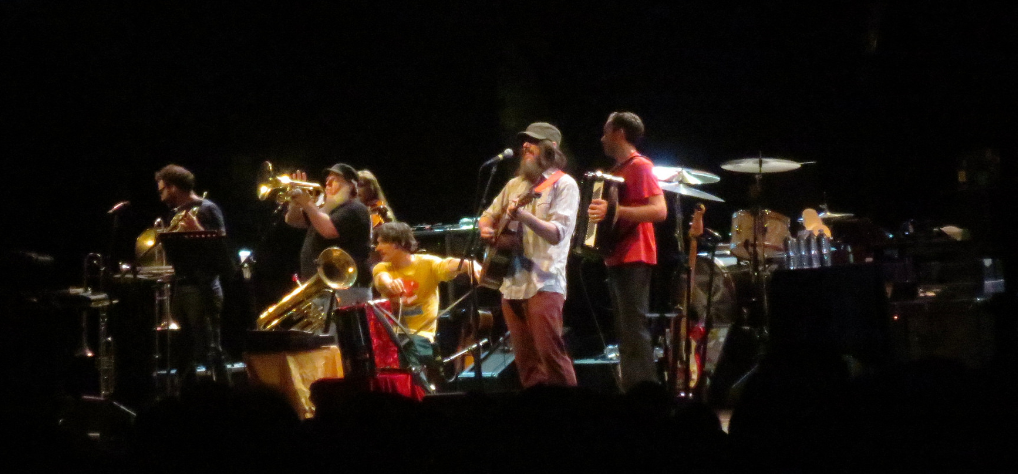
- Neutral Milk Hotel performing in 2014

Background information
- Origin: Ruston, Louisiana, U.S.
- Genres: Indie rock; psychedelic folk; lo-fi
- Works: Discography
- Years active: 1989–1998; 2013–2015
- Labels: Merge; Cher Doll; Domino; Fire
- Past members: Jeff Mangum; Scott Spillane; Jeremy Barnes; Julian Koster
- Website: walkingwallofwords.com

Neutral Milk Hotel was an American band formed by Jeff Mangum in Ruston, Louisiana, in the late 1980s. They were active until 1998, and then from 2013 to 2015. The band's music featured a deliberately low-quality sound, influenced by indie rock and psychedelic folk. Mangum wrote surreal and opaque lyrics that covered a wide range of topics, including love, spirituality, nostalgia, sex, and loneliness. The band's recordings featured a variety of instruments, including non-traditional instruments like the singing saw and uilleann pipes.

Neutral Milk Hotel began as one of Mangum's home recording projects. After graduating high school, Mangum lived as a vagabond and sporadically released music. In 1996, he worked with childhood friend Robert Schneider to record the album On Avery Island, which received positive reviews and sold around 5,000 copies. Mangum recruited musicians Julian Koster, Jeremy Barnes, and Scott Spillane for the band's second album, In the Aeroplane Over the Sea. Its 1998 release received mostly positive, but not laudatory reviews.

While on tour, the band's popularity grew through Internet exposure. This negatively affected Mangum, whose mental health began to deteriorate; he did not want to continue touring, and Neutral Milk Hotel went on hiatus shortly after. During their hiatus, Neutral Milk Hotel gained a cult following, and the critical standing of In the Aeroplane Over the Sea rose tremendously. Several music outlets such as Pitchfork and Blender called In the Aeroplane Over the Sea a landmark album for indie rock and one of the greatest albums of the 1990s. Many indie rock groups such as Arcade Fire and the Decemberists were influenced by Neutral Milk Hotel's eclectic music and earnest lyrics. Neutral Milk Hotel reunited in 2013 and undertook a reunion tour before another hiatus in 2015.

== History ==
=== Early years ===
Neutral Milk Hotel originated in Ruston, Louisiana, in the late 1980s as a home recording project of musician Jeff Mangum. (Note: Mangum believes that 1989 might be the official starting year for Neutral Milk Hotel. In an interview with Ptolemaic Terrascope, he stated, "I guess we were sort of Neutral Milk Hotel as far back as 1989, a little noise/fuzz group, kind of a ramshackle attempt at being a band".) Initially using the name Milk, Mangum made the recordings while in high school. Early Milk recordings, such as Invent Yourself a Shortcake and Beauty, were shared between Mangum and his friends Robert Schneider, Bill Doss, and Will Cullen Hart. The four friends branded these homemade cassette tapes with an imaginary record label, Elephant 6, which eventually grew into a loose musical collective. When Mangum learned of another band called Milk, he changed the name of the project to Neutral Milk Hotel, based on a name Hart suggested. According to Doss, the name is a non sequitur influenced by the Dada movement, and it does not have meaning.

After graduating from high school, Mangum attended Louisiana Tech University, but dropped out. He moved to Athens, Georgia, and played in a band called Synthetic Flying Machine with Doss and Hart, but left shortly after the band was formed. (Note: Doss and Hart would change the name of the band from Synthetic Flying Machine to the Olivia Tremor Control after Mangum left.) He then became a vagabond, and lived in cities such as Denver, Los Angeles, and Seattle. Mangum occasionally recorded music during this period, including a 1993 demo album titled Hype City Soundtrack. Schneider says Hype City Soundtrack was a reaction to what Mangum believed was the rampant commercialization of music within large cities. While living in Seattle, Mangum overcame his apprehensiveness about the music industry and released the song "Everything Is" on Cher Doll Records. The song's exposure convinced Mangum to record more music under the name Neutral Milk Hotel. According to Mangum: "The single was a godsend because I was pretty much at the end of my rope with just about everything in my life at that point ... I ended up sending a tape to [Nancy Ostrander] at Cher Doll Records and she saved me merely by saying she wanted to do a single."

At the time, Mangum was also a bass guitarist for the Apples in Stereo, a band that Schneider formed while living in Denver. The members of the Apples in Stereo wanted to sign with SpinART Records, and met with their legal representative, Brian McPherson, in Los Angeles. McPherson was drawn to Mangum, who was wearing a Shrimper Records T-shirt. After learning that Mangum wrote "Everything Is," a song that McPherson had previously listened to and enjoyed, the two worked out an agreement for McPherson to become Neutral Milk Hotel's representative. McPherson sent copies of "Everything Is" and another song, "Ruby Bulbs," to Merge Records founders Laura Ballance and Mac McCaughan. The two liked the music and added Neutral Milk Hotel to their roster. (Note: Neutral Milk Hotel did not sign a recording contract with Merge, as the label operated on a "handshake basis." When a band was added to Merge's roster, the two parties would split profits in exchange for promotion from the label.)

=== On Avery Island and expansion to a quartet ===
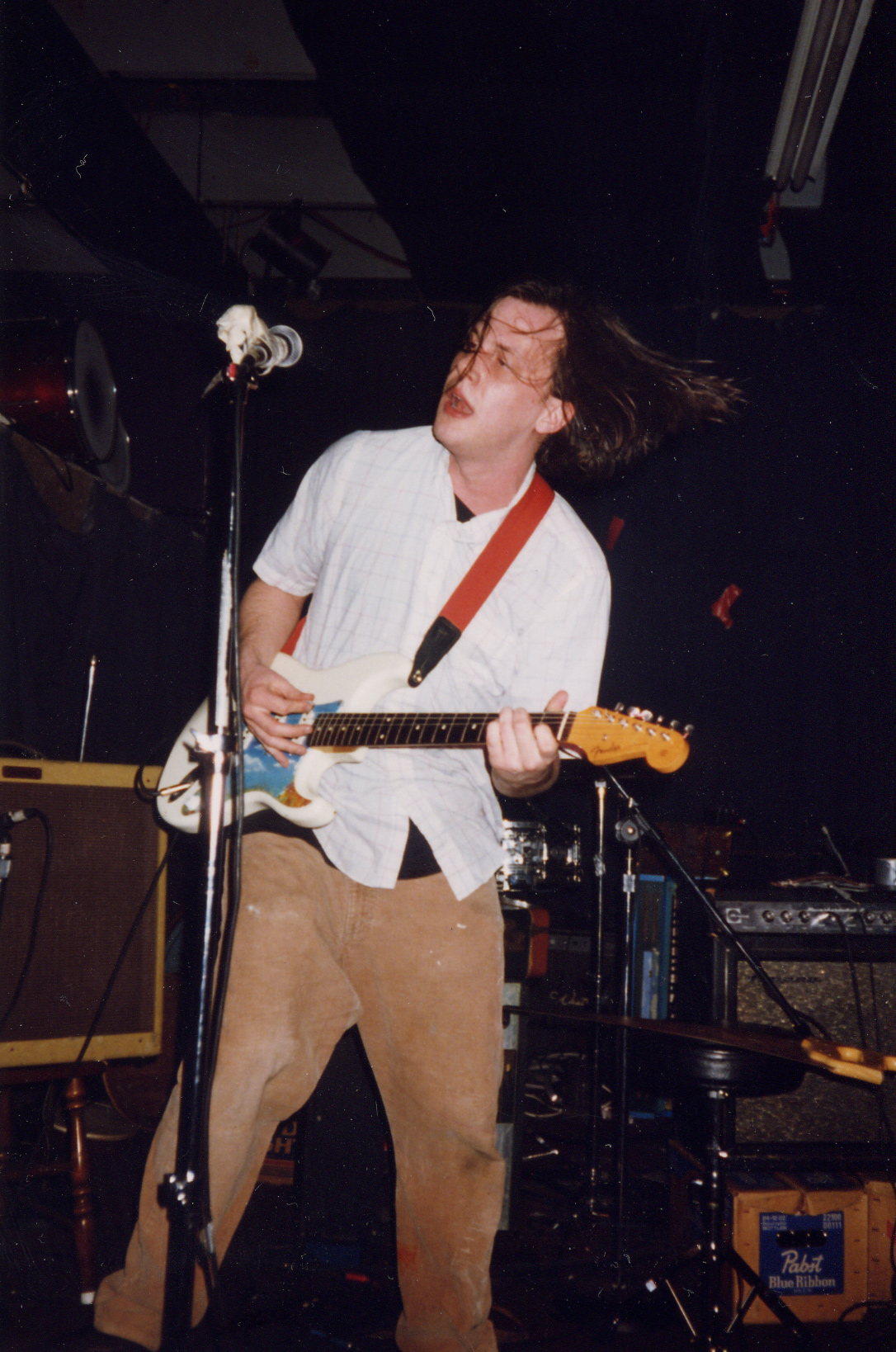
Jeff Mangum performing with Neutral Milk Hotel in 1997

Mangum moved to Denver to record the first Neutral Milk Hotel album, On Avery Island. Schneider served as the producer, and the recording sessions lasted from February to May 1995. (Note: The liner notes for On Avery Island specify that the song "Marching Theme" was recorded in June 1994.) Although Schneider was interested in an expansive Beatlesque production, he aligned with Mangum's preference for a lo-fi sound, admitting that "at first it was frustrating, but I came to enjoy it. That's how I learned to produce, doing that record, because I totally had to let go of what I thought it should be like." On Avery Island was released in the United States on March 26, 1996, by Merge Records, and in the United Kingdom on September 30, 1996, by Fire Records. It sold around 5,000 copies and received positive reviews from critics, who characterized the music as lo-fi pop. Kurt Wolff of the Houston Chronicle described listening to the music as "a trippy experience," and ultimately called the album "a fresh, exciting standout". The British publication NME wrote: "Neutral Milk Hotel can convert miserable-as-sin introspection into folky mantras that bore into your skull like a well-aimed power drill." On Avery Island was ranked at number thirty-five on The Village Voice's Pazz & Jop poll for 1996.

After the release of On Avery Island, Mangum sought other musicians to tour with. While living in Ruston, Mangum befriended New York musician Julian Koster. They exchanged demo tapes, and Koster joined Neutral Milk Hotel as the bassist. Around this period, Koster received a letter from Chicago drummer Jeremy Barnes, who wrote how he was not meeting the expectations he had set for himself. According to Koster: "Jeremy had written me this really wonderful letter, basically saying he was being led into a far different life than I think Jeremy Barnes was supposed to live ... I think he was sensing that his destiny lay elsewhere." The letter resonated with Koster and Mangum, and they traveled to Chicago to meet him. After a short audition, the two persuaded Barnes to drop out of DePaul University and join the band. The final band member came when Mangum was traveling to New York City to live with Koster. On a stop in Austin, Texas, Mangum met former Rustonian musician Scott Spillane, who was working at a pizza shop. Mangum helped make pizzas during the late-night "drunk rush", after which he convinced Spillane to join the band.

The band members moved to New York City and lived and rehearsed in a house owned by Koster's grandmother. Koster encouraged the band members to play instruments outside their comfort zones. For example, drummer Barnes learned to play the accordion, and Spillane learned how to play the horn parts from On Avery Island, practicing on a two-valve horn for hours every day. On April 28, 1997, Neutral Milk Hotel began a national tour, during which the band members learned to play as a unit. The On Avery Island tour generated enough money for the band members to afford to move to Athens, where a large group of Elephant 6 musicians were living. By the spring of 1997, Mangum had written and demoed nearly every song for a second album. He shared the demos with his bandmates before they moved to Denver to record the album.

=== In the Aeroplane Over the Sea ===
Neutral Milk Hotel's second album, In the Aeroplane Over the Sea, was produced by Schneider, and was recorded from July to September 1997. Schneider used new recording techniques to capture Mangum's lo-fi preferences. Mangum liked having a layer of distortion over the music, but Schneider did not use standard effects equipment such as Big Muffs or distortion pedals. Instead, Schneider used heavy compression and placed a Bellari RP-220 tube mic pre-amp close to Mangum's guitar. Schneider then ran the sound through a mixing console, and maxed out the sound on a cassette tape. This process was done for nearly every instrument used on In the Aeroplane Over the Sea. Schneider claimed that the nonlinearities of microphone distortion gave the album its unique "warm" quality.

In the Aeroplane Over the Sea was released on February 10, 1998. Merge pressed 5,500 CD and 1,600 vinyl copies, and expected sales to be similar to On Avery Island. These initial projections were correct, as the album sold moderately well for the first few months. Critical responses to In the Aeroplane Over the Sea were mostly positive, but not laudatory. Rob Brunner of Entertainment Weekly praised the unique instrumentation and "bouncy pop melodies", but described some of the songs as "lifeless acoustic warblers." Pitchfork's M. Christian McDermott also commended the music, which he called a blend of "Sgt. Pepper with early 90s lo-fi" that he found "as catchy as it is frightening." A more tepid review came from Ben Ratliff of Rolling Stone, who felt the rhythms and chord changes were boring, and the heavy layer of distortion sometimes masked the absence of decent melodies. CMJ New Music Monthly ranked In the Aeroplane Over the Sea as the number one album of 1998, and it placed fifteenth in the Pazz & Jop poll for 1998.

To promote the album, Neutral Milk Hotel embarked on a tour of North America and Europe. Musicians John Fernandes and Will Westbrook were brought on as touring members, and were taught how to play the horn parts with Spillane. While on tour, Neutral Milk Hotel gained a reputation for chaotic and physically demanding concerts. Great Lakes member Ben Crum recalled: "It was definitely dangerous. There often seemed to be a very real chance that someone, probably Julian, would get hurt. Jeff was always doing things like picking him up and throwing him into the drums." The band members often could not afford lodgings, and sometimes asked people in the audience if they could spend the night at their house, not realizing the homeowner was, in fact, terrified of them.

=== Hiatus and cult following ===
According to journalist Luke Winkie, the release of In the Aeroplane Over the Sea inadvertently coincided with the rise of the Internet. In the late 1990s, music journalism websites like Pitchfork became more prevalent, and online message boards increased in popularity. Winkie believes this period was important to exposing Neutral Milk Hotel to a wider audience, and wrote, "The internet has a one-of-a-kind relationship with Neutral Milk Hotel". Their newfound high profile had a negative effect on Mangum, and his mental health began to deteriorate. He constantly told his bandmates he wanted to quit, but never explained why. Some journalists have speculated he became tired of touring and constantly explaining his lyrics to fans; Elephant 6 biographer Adam Clair believes he may have been overwhelmed by the way fans viewed his music, and the high expectations placed upon any subsequent recordings. Regardless of the reason, Mangum came to the conclusion that he could not continue performing, and instead wanted to disappear from the public eye. Instead of telling the other band members of his decision, he simply avoided the topic of new music altogether. This led to the unofficial breakup of Neutral Milk Hotel shortly after the tour. The final Neutral Milk Hotel live performance occurred on October 13, 1998, in London.

During the hiatus, Mangum occasionally worked on some projects, but nothing was widely publicized. When asked about a third Neutral Milk Hotel album in a 2002 interview, Mangum said: "I don't know. It would be nice, but sometimes I kind of doubt it." Although Neutral Milk Hotel did not officially break up, the other band members worked on music with other Elephant 6 bands such as Bablicon, the Gerbils, A Hawk and a Hacksaw, and the Music Tapes. Koster notes how he and the other band members initially thought the hiatus would be a short break to focus on their other musical projects. Koster recounted: "The fact that Neutral Milk wasn't doing something just felt natural, because so much else was happening, and we had just done so much. It didn’t feel unusual at all. I suspected nothing."

Fans of Neutral Milk Hotel were not told why the band went on hiatus. Some were angry and accused Mangum of being selfish, and others wrote hoax blog posts giving fake details of upcoming tours and other false information. The speculation and online discussions raised the profile of the band, to the point that Neutral Milk Hotel and, in particular, In the Aeroplane Over the Sea gained a cult following and converted Mangum into a larger-than-life figure. In 2003, Creative Loafing writer Kevin Griffis dedicated an entire cover story to trying to track down Mangum for personal closure. The search ended when Mangum sent him an email that read: "I'm not an idea. I am a person, who obviously wants to be left alone." Journalist Mark Richardson attempted to explain In the Aeroplane Over the Sea's rise in popularity: "Because [Mangum] was inaccessible, there was no outlet for connection other than the record itself and other fans who shared a passion. By doing nothing, Neutral Milk Hotel developed a cult."

In the Aeroplane Over the Sea's critical standing rose tremendously in the years after its release, which Winkie attributes to the cult following. Domino Recording Company released a reissue in 2005, which was awarded a perfect 10/10 score by Mark Richardson of Pitchfork. Richardson wrote: "It's a record of images, associations, and threads; no single word describes it so well as the beautiful and overused kaleidoscope." Other music outlets such as AllMusic and the Encyclopedia of Popular Music also gave the album perfect scores. In the Aeroplane Over the Sea's sales figures increased during the 2000s, with an estimated 140,000 copies sold by 2005. Polygon writer Garrett Martin noted how fans of the album were "incredibly passionate", recording covers for YouTube, writing poetry, and forming tribute bands. Martin said: "The fanbase might be relatively small, but it's fervent."

=== Reunion and second hiatus ===
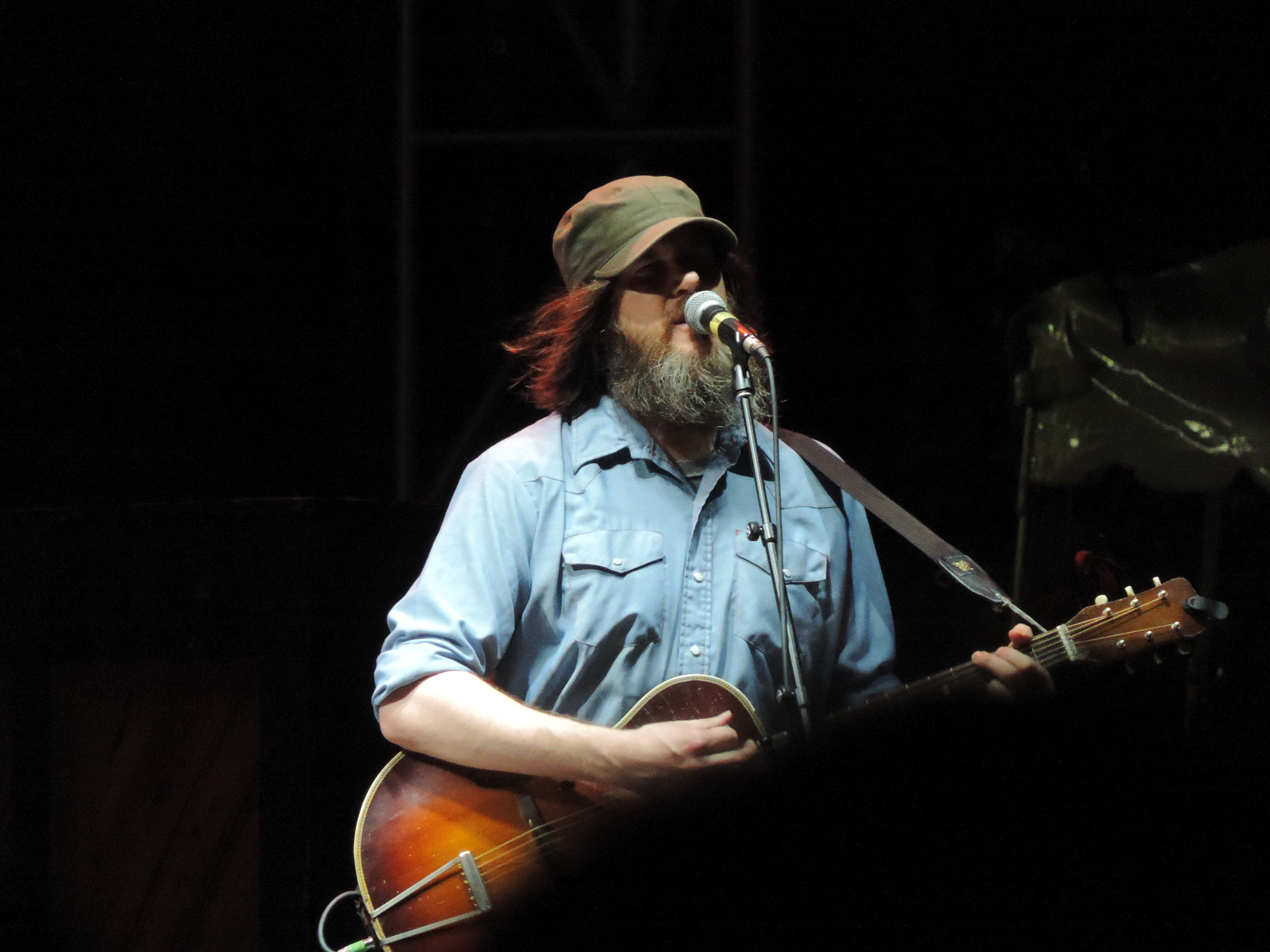
Jeff Mangum performing on the Neutral Milk Hotel reunion tour in 2014

Mangum resurfaced in 2008 with a few solo shows before embarking on full solo tours in 2011 and 2012. During this time, Mangum curated a box set of Neutral Milk Hotel material, which included an extended play of unreleased songs titled Ferris Wheel on Fire. As Mangum was active again within the music industry, rumors began spreading among fans and music outlets of a potential Neutral Milk Hotel reunion.

On April 29, 2013, Neutral Milk Hotel officially announced a reunion tour with all four members of the band. In an interview with Orlando Weekly, Schneider said: "[The hiatus] certainly wasn't purposeful, and I'm not sure [Mangum] even realized he was being a recluse until it was overwhelmingly the case that everyone was talking about it. I've known for seven years that he was going to start touring. I didn't know if he was going to actually start doing it, but I knew in my heart that he was working toward it." Neutral Milk Hotel toured from 2013 to 2015. In a 2014 post on the Neutral Milk Hotel website, the band members wrote how their 2015 tour would be their last tour for the "foreseeable future", and that they were going to take an extended hiatus. The post stated: "Dear friends we love you but it's time to say goodbye for the never ending now."

In 2023, Neutral Milk Hotel released another box set, titled The Collected Works of Neutral Milk Hotel. The box set includes every recording by the band, including Live at Jittery Joe's, a live album Mangum released independently in 2001. The Collected Works of Neutral Milk Hotel was nominated for the Grammy Award for Best Boxed or Special Limited Edition Package at the 66th Annual Grammy Awards.

== Artistry ==
=== Music ===
"In the Aeroplane Over the Sea"
A 10 second audio sample of the song "In the Aeroplane Over the Sea". Similar to many Neutral Milk Hotel songs, it employs acoustic chord progressions and unique instruments. This song in particular features a singing saw.

Neutral Milk Hotel is known for its experimental sound, which has been described as a mixture of indie rock and psychedelic folk, with lo-fi production. Critics have noted many other musical influences, including Eastern European choral music, Canterbury Sound, circus music, marching band music, musique concrète, drone music, free jazz, and Tropicália. Neutral Milk Hotel songs typically involved simple chord progressions that Mangum would strum on an acoustic guitar. Often as the song progressed, more instruments would be introduced. The band's recordings feature a wide range of instruments; on In the Aeroplane Over the Sea for example, conventional instruments like drums and distorted guitars were paired with unique instruments like the singing saw and uilleann pipes.

Neutral Milk Hotel's early recordings, before On Avery Island, featured much distortion and are considered rough. Mark Richardson of Pitchfork believes Mangum's songwriting was undeveloped, and described the 1994 song "Ruby Bulbs" as "raw and noisy and shouty and reflects Mangum's interest in aggro punk, an influence that didn't otherwise surface on his records." On Avery Island represented a move toward greater musical cohesion, and more experimentation. Critic Sasha Geffen said: "The album veers wildly between the accessible and the inscrutable ... the abrupt transitions between perfect pop melodies and gaseous balls of noise lend the album a certain wildfire charm." The most experimental song on the album is the final track "Pree-Sisters Swallowing a Donkey's Eye," a thirteen-minute drone track influenced by gamelan and noise music.

Many critics believe In the Aeroplane Over the Sea is Neutral Milk Hotel's best and most fully developed release. By this point, Neutral Milk Hotel had four members as opposed to just Mangum, which allowed for a more complex and organic sound. Jason Ankeny of AllMusic notes In the Aeroplane Over the Sea emphasizes structure and texture, and that tracks seamlessly segue into one another. The overall sound of the album sometimes abruptly shifts from track to track. Rolling Stone notes the range of musical styles present on the album, such as funeral marches and punk rock. Critic Chris DeVille offers similar commentary, writing: "On the musical axis, Neutral Milk Hotel veered from piercingly intimate psychedelic campfire sing-alongs to full-band segments that barreled ahead with haphazard grace."

=== Lyrics ===
Mangum served as the lyricist for Neutral Milk Hotel. Critic Jim DeRogatis describes Mangum's lyrics as surreal and opaque, and notes that they feature a stream of consciousness style of songwriting. The lyrics would often include references to seemingly unrelated subject matter. Biographer Kim Cooper cites the song "King of Carrot Flowers, Pt.1" as an example of this style of songwriting; although the lyrics are about childhood fantasies, there are references to sexual awakenings, domestic violence, religious fanaticism, and tarot card readings. DeRogatis likened Mangum's lyricism to "Dr. Seuss illustrating William S. Burroughs, or perhaps Sigmund Freud collaborating on lyrics with Syd Barrett."

According to Mangum, many of his lyrics stem from his subconscious, saying: "Some of it I don't understand, I don't know what it is, but it sounds real nice." Another source of inspiration were the visions, lucid dreams, and night terrors Mangum would have. Mangum would sometimes have full conversations between himself and Schneider while sleepwalking. After coming up with an idea for a song, Mangum would start writing "word bridges," which are small connecting ideas that would bridge the seemingly unrelated lyrics. Mangum cites the song "Two-Headed Boy" as an example, as each verse was written separately from the others over a long period of time, and he used the "word bridges" to connect the verses.

Neutral Milk Hotel songs explore many lyrical themes, including love, spirituality, nostalgia, sex, and loneliness. DeRogatis describes Mangum's lyrics as a depiction of id, a personality component related to intrinsic desires. Mangum's lyrics can also be seen as a reaction to events that have happened in his life. For example, "Song Against Sex" was written as a reaction to the use of sex as a source of power in a relationship. A central lyrical topic in In the Aeroplane Over the Sea is the life of Anne Frank, a teenage girl who died in a Nazi concentration camp. Tracks such as "Holland, 1945" and "Ghost" incorporate elements of Frank's life into the lyrics. As a result, some listeners have described In the Aeroplane Over the Sea as a concept album. Anwen Crawford of The Monthly disagrees with this assertion, writing: "It would be overly literal, though, to describe In the Aeroplane Over the Sea as an album about the Holocaust, for Frank is only one of many phantasms to populate a set of looping, interlinked narratives that proceed with the closed logic of a dream or a religious vision."

=== Live performances ===
That band was never, in any way, what you would call tight or polished. They were like, if you took a carnival, and you played it on an AM radio, and then you stuck it in a bucket with a microphone and recorded it, and then took that recording and played it on a Victrola, and then rolled it down the stairs, and there's someone there to catch it – that's a Neutral Milk Hotel show.

— Robert Schneider

Neutral Milk Hotel's live performances often featured the four main band members and several other musicians. For example, the reunion tour featured backing musicians Laura Carter, Jeremy Thal, and Mangum's wife Astra Taylor. Almost every musician on stage would play multiple instruments, and switch instruments between songs. Neutral Milk Hotel shows typically lasted between forty-five and ninety minutes. The equipment used onstage was cheap and of poor quality, although for the reunion tour more expensive equipment was used.

Early Neutral Milk Hotel shows were chaotic and disorganized. Butterglory toured with Neutral Milk Hotel in 1996, and member Matt Suggs recalled: "Mangum & Co were confused and disorganized and lovable." In these early performances, band members would wrestle and tickle each other on stage. During the In the Aeroplane Over the Sea tour, the audio technicians for most venues were confused and did not know what to expect. As a result, Carter took on the unusual role of "mix-board translator". According to Carter: "It was more like talking them through what was about to happen, because so much was happening onstage that without someone helping, it was a wail or squeal and the soundman would look at twenty instruments onstage and not know what to dive for."

== Legacy ==
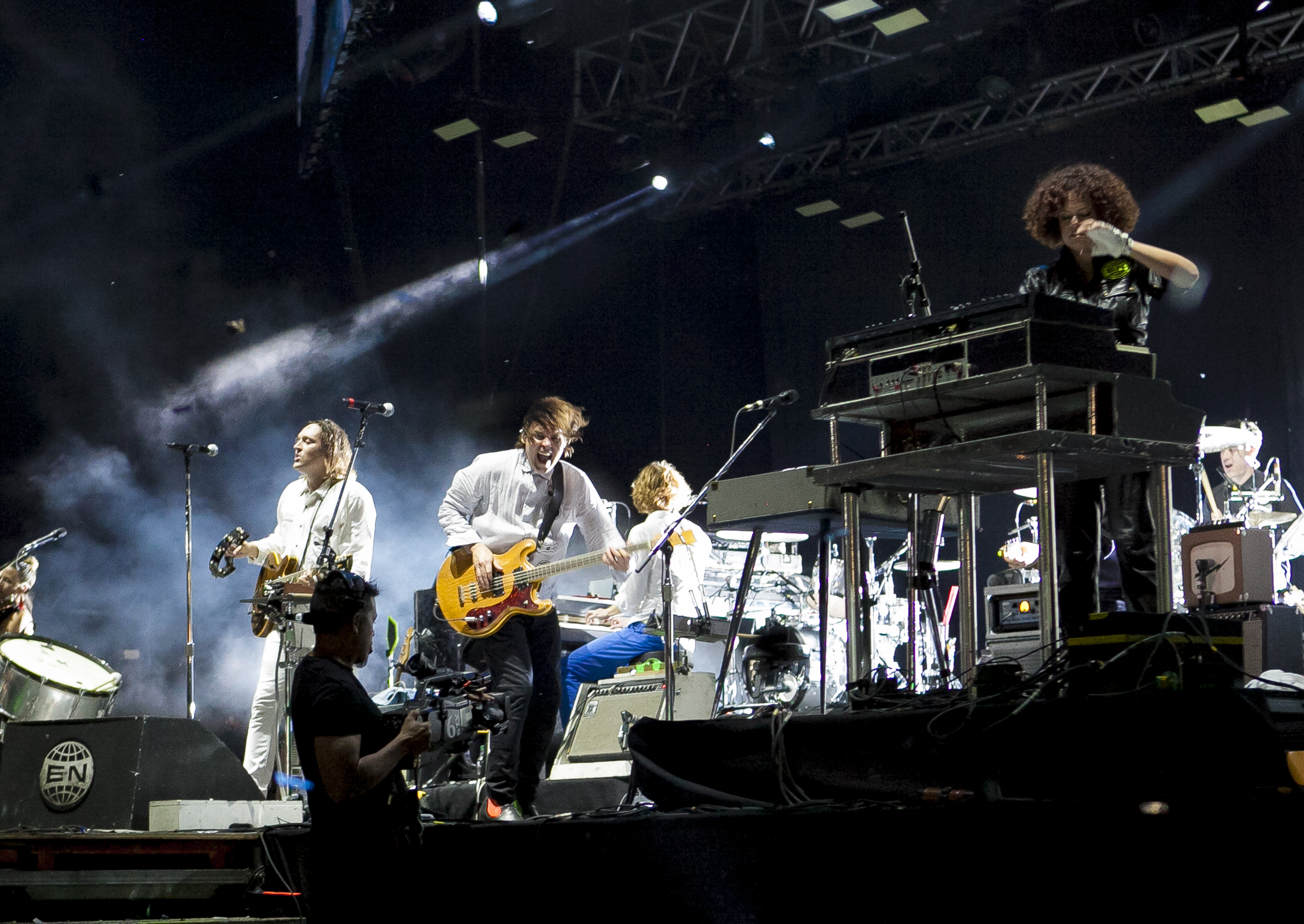
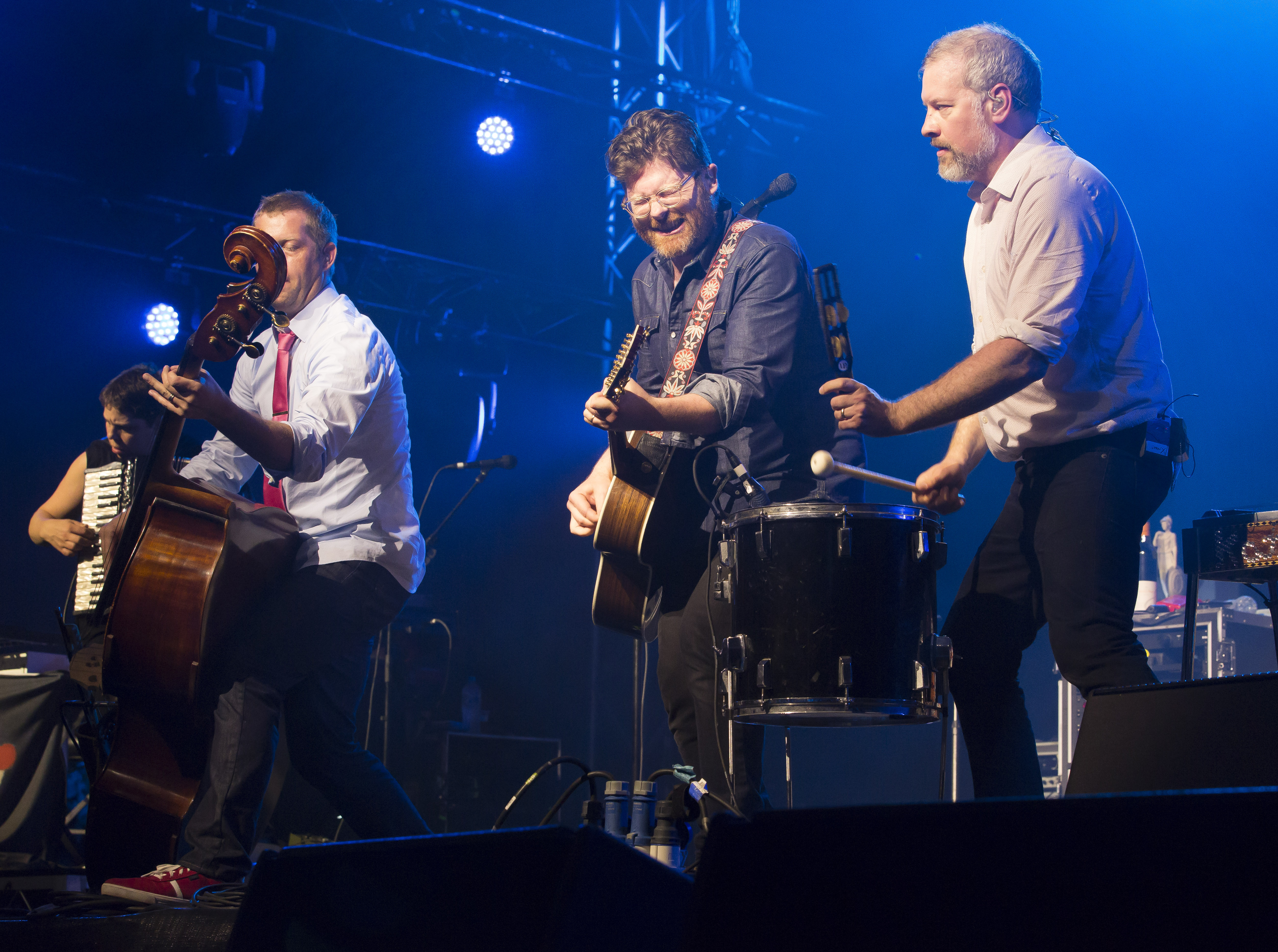
Neutral Milk Hotel has influenced many indie rock bands, including Arcade Fire (top) and the Decemberists (bottom).

When Neutral Milk Hotel disbanded in 1998, the subsequent cult following propelled them to a new level of stardom, and many fans and journalists now regard Neutral Milk Hotel as a seminal indie rock band. Much of Neutral Milk Hotel's legacy is derived from In the Aeroplane Over the Sea, which reached sales of roughly 400,000 by 2013. Music outlets such as Pitchfork and Blender have ranked it as one of the greatest indie rock albums of all time, as well as one of the best albums of the 1990s. Richardson noted that In the Aeroplane Over the Sea has become ingrained in the indie rock canon, and consistently attracts new listeners. Chris Morgan of Uproxx wrote: "In short, people share a very deep passion for Neutral Milk Hotel's highly lauded sophomore album ... Lots of albums are loved, but few seem to impact people so much, and so singularly." Some critics have discussed how other recordings of the band, such as On Avery Island, are often overlooked by fans due to the popularity of In the Aeroplane Over the Sea.

Part of Neutral Milk Hotel's legacy is also drawn from the general mystique surrounding Mangum. Elephant 6 biographer Adam Clair notes that Mangum's unexplained absence made him more notable than when he was an active member of the music industry. He actively avoided giving interviews, and as a result, music publications wrote clickbait-esque articles in which they attempted to explain his disappearance with little to no substantive evidence. Even after Mangum resurfaced in 2008, music publications continued publishing detailed reports on his life. Neutral Milk Hotel's legal representative Brian McPherson said: "When the guy sneezes it's on the front page of Pitchfork."

Neutral Milk Hotel has influenced many indie rock bands. According to Miles Raymer of Esquire, the band's cacophonous sound and earnest lyrics were in direct contrast to the underground music scene in the 1990s. While many groups focused on the theme of detached irony, Neutral Milk Hotel's abrasive and overtly emotional lyrics struck a chord with social outcasts. Groups influenced by Neutral Milk Hotel include Arcade Fire and the Decemberists, both of whom create psychedelic-folk inspired music with non-traditional instruments. Arcade Fire frontman Win Butler said that Neutral Milk Hotel's association with Merge Records was a contributing factor to their signing with Merge Records. Neutral Milk Hotel also influenced bands like AJJ, Beirut, Bright Eyes, the Lumineers, Okkervil River, and Pwr Bttm, as well as artists like Melanie Martinez, Kesha, and Amanda Palmer.

== Members ==
- Jeff Mangum – guitars, lead vocals, keyboards, drums (early) (1989–1998, 2013–2015)
- Julian Koster – bass guitar, accordion, musical saw, bowed banjo, keyboards, organ (1996–1998, 2013–2015)
- Scott Spillane – trumpet, guitar, flugelhorn, trombone, euphonium, horn arrangements (1996–1998, 2013–2015)
- Jeremy Barnes – drums, piano, organ (1996–1998, 2013–2015)

=== Touring members ===
- Laura Carter – zanzithophone, trumpet, clarinet, uilleann pipes (1996–1998, 2013–2015)
- Astra Taylor – guitar, accordion, keyboards (2013–2015)
- Jeremy Thal – bass guitar, trombone, flugelhorn, French horn, uilleann pipes (2013–2015)

== Discography ==
- On Avery Island (1996)
- In the Aeroplane Over the Sea (1998)
