= Everything Is (song) =

Single by Neutral Milk Hotel
- B-side: "Snow Song Pt. One"
- Released: 1994 (single); 1995 (EP) (Fire reissue); 2001 (EP) (Orange Twin reissue); 2011 (EP) (NMH reissue); 2023 (EP) (Merge reissue)
- Recorded: 1991–1993
- Studio: Jeff Mangum's home, Garden Gate Studio
- Genre: Indie rock; lo-fi
- Label: Cher Doll (7"); Fire (7", CD); Orange Twin (CD); NMH (10"); Merge (streaming)
- Songwriter: Jeff Mangum
- Producer: Jeff Mangum

Neutral Milk Hotel singles chronology
"Everything Is" (1994)	"Holland, 1945" (1998)

Alternative cover
- The original Everything Is 7"

Professional ratings
Review scores
Source	Rating
AllMusic	3/5 stars
Pitchfork Media	(6.0/10)

"Everything Is" was the first recording mass-released by Neutral Milk Hotel. The recording was originally the second release on the fledgling Seattle label Cher Doll Records in 1994, in the form of a 7", with "Everything Is" as the A side, and "Snow Song Pt. 1" as the B side. The first 50 7"s pressed also featured different artwork, with each sleeve being personally xeroxed by Mangum.

The British label Fire Records re-released the record in 1995, on CD and 7", with the 7" retaining the same A and B sides, and the CD version featuring an extra track, "Aunt Eggma Blowtorch", a five-minute sound collage by Mangum. Both the CD and 7" featured different artwork. The Fire version is also out of print, though not as collectible as the Cher Doll version.

In 2001, the recently founded Orange Twin Records (owned by members of Elephant 6 band Elf Power) re-released the single, this time on CD only, adding the extra track "Tuesday Moon". The artwork remained the same as was previously seen on the Fire release. This version is no longer in print.

The songs featured on the EP are distinctly representative of the early, 'embryonic' Neutral Milk Hotel, and indeed, all but "Snow Song Pt. 1" feature in identical versions on earlier tapes which are in circulation. "Everything Is" appears on the second unnamed demo, which is assumed to have been produced in 1993. "Aunt Eggma Blowtorch" also features on this demo, and a slightly longer version appears on 1992's Beauty as "Hypnotic Sounds", allegedly one of the first Neutral Milk Hotel recordings. "Tuesday Moon" can also be found on Invent Yourself a Shortcake, listed as "Love You on a Tuesday", although the version that appears on the Orange Twin re-release is culled from 1993's Hype City Soundtrack.

The UK release of On Avery Island (on Fire Records) featured the original two tracks from the "Everything Is" single as bonus tracks, though without the band's permission.

In December 2011, the EP was re-released as part of the "Walking Wall of Words" box set self-released by Neutral Milk Hotel records. This 10" version of the album featured three new songs and new artwork.

The EP was made available for sale as a digital download – in the expanded 7 track edition – from the band's official website in 2019. The 10" EP was added to streaming services in February 2023, after the announcement of a vinyl box set of the Neutral Milk Hotel back catalogue on Merge Records.

== Recording and sound ==
The EP Everything Is was recorded between 1991 and 1993 on Jeff Mangum's four-track recorder, still using the name to branch out with his musical projects instead of forming an actual band. Throughout the recording of the EP, Jeff featured many friends and fellow musicians on the recordings on several songs, while Robert Schneider proceeded to master the album from the original cassette recordings.

The sound of the EP Everything Is differs from his work from On Avery Island onwards, as it was still a projection of his experimentation and lo-fi outlet. The bulk of the EP includes lo-fi, fuzzy, and psychedelic-influenced songs that range from being closely related to his acoustic-based work to punk-like rhythms and psychedelic tones. Before "Everything Is", Jeff experimented with noise and tape loops, and after the EP he began working with acoustic melodies and horn sections. This is often seen as the bridging point between his two styles.

== Track listing and formats ==
All tracks are written by Jeff Mangum.

7" Single (CHER 002)
No.	Title	Length
1.	"Everything Is"	3:42
2.	"Snow Song Pt. One"	3:51
Total length:		7:33

CD EP (BLAZE 79CD)
No.	Title	Length
1.	"Everything Is"	3:42
2.	"Snow Song Pt. One"	3:51
3.	"Aunt Eggma Blowtorch"	5:00
Total length:		12:33

CD EP (OTR 005)
No.	Title	Length
1.	"Everything Is"	3:42
2.	"Snow Song Pt. One"	3:51
3.	"Aunt Eggma Blowtorch"	5:00
4.	"Tuesday Moon"	2:16
Total length:		14:50

10" EP (NMH 001) and Streaming Platforms
No.	Title	Length
1.	"Everything Is"	3:33
2.	"Here We Are (For W. Cullen Hart)"	2:33
3.	"Unborn"	3:43
4.	"Tuesday Moon"	2:16
5.	"Ruby Bulbs"	1:39
6.	"Snow Song"	3:42
7.	"Aunt Eggma Blowtorch (Summer 1989)"	5:00
Total length:		22:26

== Personnel ==
Credits adapted from the liner notes of Everything Is.

Neutral Milk Hotel

- Jeff Mangum – guitar, drums, voice, accordion, tapes, label collages, album design, producer

Additional musicians

- Shannon Willis – voice on "Ruby Bulbs"
- Bill Doss – drums on "Ruby Bulbs"
- Yvonne Grzenkowicz – dream tape on "Tuesday Moon"
- Colby Katz – voice

Technical personnel

- Robert Schneider – mixing
- Will Cullen Hart – front cover
- Mark Ohe – album design
