= Scott Spillane =

American musician (born 1965)

- Born: September 26, 1965 (age 60)
- Genres: Rock; Psychedelic folk; Lo-fi
- Occupations: Musician; composer
- Instruments: Trumpet; trombone; vocals; guitar
- Member of: The Scott Spillane Experience
- Formerly of: Neutral Milk Hotel, the Gerbils

Scott Edward Spillane (born September 26, 1965) is an American musician. He was part of the Gerbils and was one of the original members of the band Neutral Milk Hotel, for which he also served as a composer. He also has appeared on albums and in live shows by Elephant 6 artists such as the Olivia Tremor Control, of Montreal and Elf Power. As of the 2020s, he has begun performing as the Scott Spillane Experience in his local Athens.
