= Ursa Minor (Nana Grizol album) =

2017 studio album

Studio album by Nana Grizol
- Released: March 31, 2017
- Recorded: 2016–2017
- Genre: Indie rock
- Length: 34:54
- Label: Orange Twin

Nana Grizol chronology
Ruth (2010)	Ursa Minor (2017)	South Somewhere Else (2020)

Ursa Minor is the third studio album by American indie folk group Nana Grizol. It was released by Orange Twin on March 31, 2017.

== Track listing ==
All music is composed by Nana Grizol.

No.	Title	Length
1.	"Nightlights I"	3:30
2.	"Bright Cloud"	2:49
3.	"Mississippi Swells"	4:20
4.	"Almost Know Your Name"	2:52
5.	"Photos From When We Were Young"	3:25
6.	"Ursa Minor I"	1:04
7.	"Nightlights II"	2:18
8.	"Explained Away"	2:46
9.	"T.V. Song"	3:11
10.	"Tacoma Center 1600"	3:53
11.	"Ursa Minor II"	0:59
12.	"Window"	3:47
Total length:		34:54

== Personnel ==
Nana Grizol

- Theodore Hilton
- Laura Carter
- Matte Cathcart
- Robbie Cucchiaro
- Jared Gandy

Production

- Jason NeSmith – mastering
- Andy LeMaster – co-producer, recorded by

Artwork

- Kev Connell – bear
- Christy Gressman – handwriting
- Robbie Cucchiaro – moon anchor, handwriting
- Patrick Sprague – paintings
