= Nana Grizol =

American indie rock band

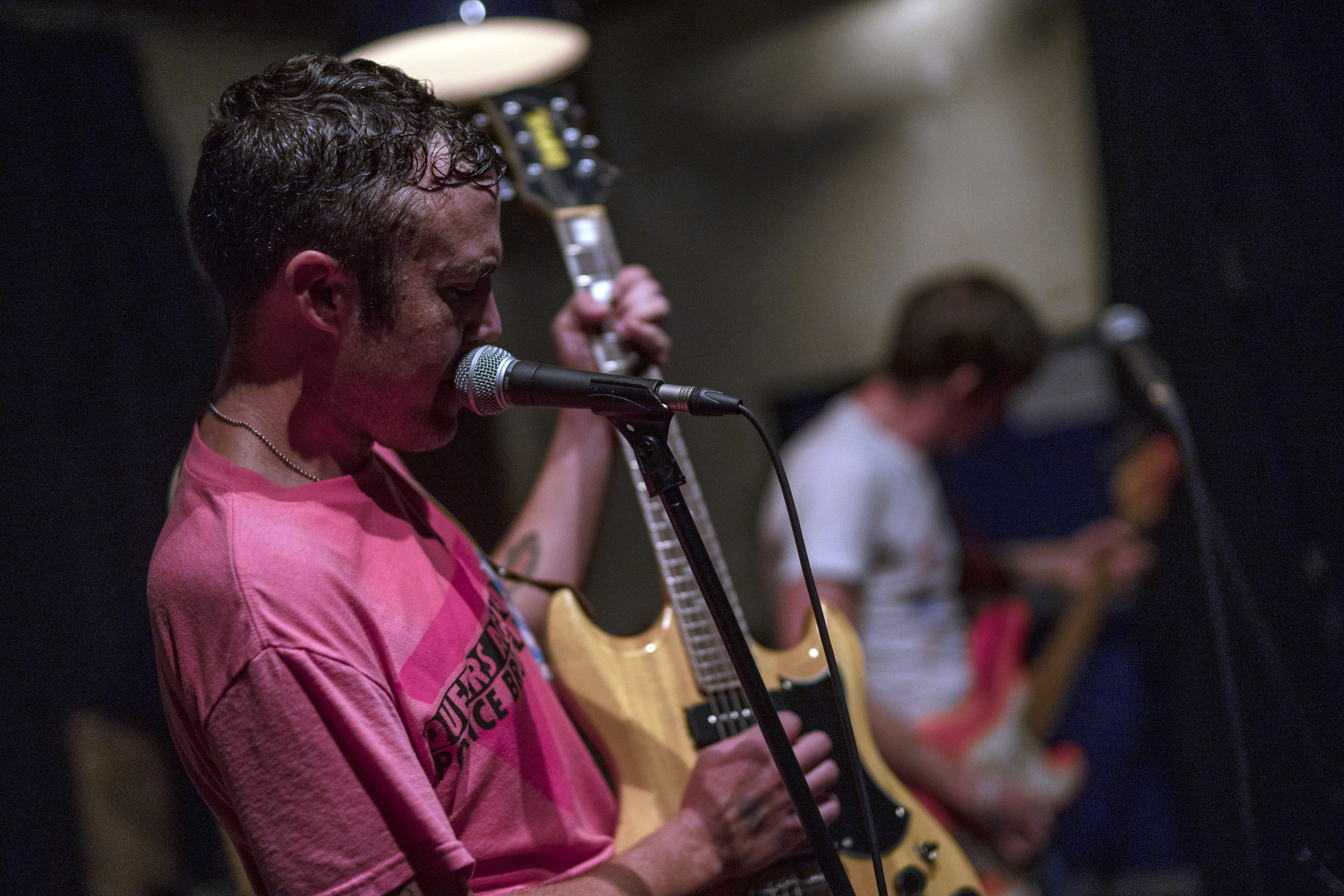
- Nana Grizol in Washington D.C. in 2019

Background information
- Origin: Athens, Georgia
- Genres: Indie folk, indie rock, lo-fi, folk punk
- Years active: 2003–present
- Labels: Orange Twin, Don Giovanni, Cruisin'
- Members: Theo Hilton; Madeline Adams; Laura Carter; Jared Gandy; Patrick Jennings; Robbie Cucchiaro
- Past members: Michael Schneeweis; Lacey Jon; Kate Mitchell; Ian Rickert; Margaret Child; Emily Simpson

Nana Grizol is an American indie folk band based in Athens, Georgia, signed to Orange Twin Records. In addition to frontman Theo Hilton (Defiance, Ohio), Nana Grizol features Laura Carter (Elf Power, Neutral Milk Hotel), Robbie Cucchiaro (The Music Tapes, Neutral Milk Hotel), Jared Gandy (Witches), drummer Matte Cathcart and Kate Mitchell, Ian Rickert, Patrick Jennings and Michael Schneeweis (Michael Jordan Touchdown Pass). Solo artist Madeline Adams also appears on Love It Love It.

Nana Grizol released their debut album, Love It Love It on May 13, 2008. Their second album, Ruth, was released on January 10, 2010. Their third album, Ursa Minor, was released in 2017. A compilation of early recordings was released in 2019, titled Theo Zumm. Their fifth album, South Somewhere Else, which was released on June 26, 2020, was announced with the release of the single Future Version. They released their second EP, Dancing Dogs, on December 23, 2022.

== Members ==
Current

- Theo Hilton – vocals, electric guitar, acoustic guitar (2003–present)
- Madeline Adams – vocals, bass (2007–present)
- Laura Carter – drums, trumpet, clarinet (2007–present)
- Matte Cathcart – drums (2007–present)
- Jared Gandy – bass, guitar (2007–present)
- Patrick Jennings – piano, rhodes (2007–present)
- Robbie Cucchiaro – trumpet, euphonium, guitar, bari sax (2009–present)

Former

- Kate Mitchell – trumpet (2007–2009)
- Ian Rickert – clarinet, harmonica (2007–2009)
- Margaret Child – glockenspiel, tambourine (2007–2009)
- Michael Schneeweis – writing (Ruth)
- Emily Simpson – vocals (Nightlights I-III+Tacoma Center 1600)
- Lacey Jon – percussion

== Discography ==
Albums
Release date	Title	Label	Format
May 13, 2008	Love It Love It	Orange Twin Record Company	CD, LP
January 10, 2010	Ruth	Orange Twin Record Company	CD, LP
March 31, 2017	Ursa Minor	Orange Twin Record Company	CD, LP
June 26, 2020	South Somewhere Else	Don Giovanni Records / Arrowhawk Records	CD, LP
December 23, 2022	Dancing Dogs	Cruisin Records	LP, Digital

Compilations
Release date	Title	Label	Format
October 19, 2018	Theo Zumm	CRUISIN' RECORDS	CD, LP

EPs
Release date	Title	Label	Format
2014	Nightlights I-III + Tacoma Center 1600	Self Released	MP3
2026	FRANCES I+II	Self Released	MP3
