= When the Red King Comes =

Studio album by Elf Power
- Released: 1997
- Recorded: 1996–1997
- Genre: Indie pop, indie rock
- Length: 39:47
- Label: Arena Rock Recording Co.

Elf Power chronology
Vainly Clutching at Phantom Limbs (1995)	When the Red King Comes (1997)	A Dream in Sound (1999)

Professional ratings
Review scores
Source	Rating
AllMusic	3.5/5 stars
Chicago Tribune	4/4 stars

When the Red King Comes is the second album by the Elephant 6 band Elf Power. It is a concept album about the Red King's kingdom. The cover art is taken from a section of an imaginary map called “The Land of Make Believe”, drawn in 1930 by Jaro Hess. A more complete version of the map can be seen in The Writer's Map: An Atlas of Imaginary Lands.

"Needles in the Camel's Eyes" is a cover of the Brian Eno song.

== Critical reception ==
Trouser Press wrote that "though still noisy, the improved sound coincides with a sharper focus in the songwriting (that's good) and the first hint of impending mythological obsessions (not so good)." The Chicago Tribune thought that "in Elf Power's hands, psychedelia is a means of transforming personal trauma into a twisted kind of triumph."

AllMusic wrote that "the fuzzy, lo-fi production is an Elephant 6 hallmark, but the unique instrumentation (electric horns, pump organs, even Nepalese percussion) and cryptic, stream-of-consciousness wordplay suggest something altogether different."

== Track listing ==
All tracks are written by Andrew Rieger unless otherwise noted.

No.	Title	Writer(s)	Length
1.	"Step Through the Portal"		1:57
2.	"Into the Everlasting Time"		1:59
3.	"The Frightened Singers"		0:46
4.	"The Secret Ocean"		3:00
5.	"The Arrow Flies Close"		2:38
6.	"Icy Hands Will Never Melt Away"		3:27
7.	"When the Red King Comes"		3:29
8.	"Separating Fault"		3:33
9.	"Spectators"		2:20
10.	"Introducing Cosmic Space"	Andrew Rieger, Bryan Helium	3:29
11.	"The Bengal Parade"		3:00
12.	"Needles in the Camels Eyes"	Brian Eno, Phil Manzanera	3:01
13.	"The Silver Lake"	Laura Carter	3:39
14.	"It's Been a Million Years"		3:28
Total length:			39:47

== Personnel ==
- Andrew Rieger - guitars, vocals, flute, zanzitophone, keyboards, bass, percussion
- Laura Carter - keyboards, vocals, Moog synthesizer, zanzithophone, loops
- Bryan Helium - bass, vocals, guitar, sitar, keyboards
- Aaron Wegelin - drums, vocals, percussion
