= Shut Up, Little Man! =

Bootleg "audio vérité" illicit recordings

Shut Up, Little Man! is the title of bootleg "audio vérité" illicit recordings of two argumentative and violent alcoholics, Peter J. Haskett (1928–1996) and Raymond L. Huffman (1931–1992) in San Francisco. The recordings were initially distributed on cassette tape; Bananafish magazine arranged for a small commercial release in 1992. From 1994 through 1996 there were multiple failed attempts to obtain the rights to the recordings from Haskett. Beginning in 1999, the original recorders began pressing their own CD copies and selling them online.

The recordings were made by "Eddie Lee Sausage" and "Mitchell D.", who lived in a bright pink apartment building at 237 Steiner Street (dubbed the "Pepto Bismol Palace") in San Francisco's Lower Haight district. Eddie Lee and Mitchell moved into the apartment in 1987, and discovered that their neighbors, Haskett and Huffman, argued nearly constantly, with Peter often shouting "shut up, little man!" at Ray. Eddie and Mitchell began tape recording the arguments, and distributing copies among their friends. Eddie Lee and Mitchell sometimes goaded Ray and Peter with prank telephone calls.

== Recording subjects ==
Peter Haskett was a former advertising executive. He studied advertising at Northwestern University and worked on accounts for Alka-Seltzer, Carling Black Label beer, and Old Gold. Haskett became unable to work in 1972 due to major depressive disorder and moved in with Huffman, an unemployed alcoholic about whom little is known. The two enabled each others' drinking.

In February 1992, Huffman died of a heart attack brought on by colon cancer, pancreatitis, and alcoholism. In November 1992, Haskett was severely physically abused by another roommate, Tony Newton, and made to leave his home; "Sausage" and "D" obtained a police interview with Haskett and posted it to their website. Haskett died in 1996 of liver problems due to alcoholism.

== Reception ==
The first Shut Up, Little Man! compact disc was released in early 1993. A number of other volumes were issued later. The recordings quickly gained a cult following, and were adapted into comic books, zines, a theatrical production and the 2001 independent film Shut Yer Dirty Little Mouth!, starring Gill Gayle and Glenn Shadix as Ray and Peter, respectively.

The recordings found fame far beyond San Francisco. Lee reports that:

I went to see (New York City-based) John Zorn, one of my favorite jazz composers, performing with his experimental game-playing ensemble, Cobra. The keyboard player had sampled Shut Up Little Man, and thus, throughout the evening—amidst the saxophone squawks and grinding guitar breaks—there would be sampled little blasts of: “Shut your fuckin' mouth!” or “I want to kill!”

== Documentary film ==
Poster for the 2010 documentary Shut Up Little Man! – An Audio Misadventure

In 2011 a feature documentary called Shut Up Little Man! – An Audio Misadventure was selected for the 2011 Sundance Film Festival as part of the World Documentary section, where it had its world premiere. It was written and directed by Matthew Bate and produced by Sophie Hyde. The film details "Sausage" and "D"'s attempts to contact Huffman in the 1990s as well as Tony Newton, a fellow alcoholic and on-and-off roommate of Haskett and Huffman. "Sausage" and "D" offered Haskett $200 as a gift following the success of the recordings, but Haskett refused the money. Another person eager for the recording rights plied Haskett with alcohol until he was coerced into signing a contract; this was soon recognized to be legally invalid. For the documentary, "Sausage" and "D" offered Newton $100 and a pack of beer to be interviewed, and Newton reluctantly accepted while trying to refuse the beer. According to Newton, despite the near-constant vitriol and occasional physical violence, Haskett and Huffman were extremely close friends. They cooked for one another, took care of each other while they were sick, and one would often visit the other during hospital stays. The film ends with a fictionalized sequence depicting Haskett and Huffman as gay lovers.

== Popular culture ==
- This American Life (then known as Your Radio Playhouse) featured the recordings in a 1995 program titled "Quitting".
- The band Devo's side project the Wipeouters sampled the recordings in their track "Shut Up, Little Man".
- San Francisco indie rock band the Thinking Fellers Union Local 282 sampled Peter and Raymond on their 1991 album "Lovelyville" and their song "Raymond H" appeared on their following album, Mother of All Saints.
- Boston indie rock band Swirlies excerpted a snippet of Peter and Raymond's dialogue on their 1993 album Blonder Tongue Audio Baton.
- Judy Hopps' noisy neighbors in the film Zootopia are inspired by Peter and Raymond.
- An episode of SpongeBob SquarePants, "Banned in Bikini Bottom", features the phrases "you are a nuisance to my community", "…said this ninety times", and "cops, I need you!" In another episode, "Porous Pockets", SpongeBob says, "and I said, go ahead, let’s do it right now! I got too much hair, anyways." referring to what Raymond claims he told the police. In "The Algae's Always Greener", Mr. Krabs says to Plankton "you're just a dirty little man". In episode 17 of Season 5, Spongehenge Patrick says "I wanna watch something decent, like..." which may be a reference to the recording in which Raymond and Peter are arguing about what to watch on TV and Raymond says that exact line.
- Songwriter Red Label Catharsis featured samples of Ray and Peter in the song "Black Label The Old Crow", which relates the dregs of alcoholism, from the 2006 release Chrystie.
- On a commentary track for the animated series Mission Hill, creators Josh Weinstein and Bill Oakley claim that the characters Gus and Wally were based on Ray and Peter.
