= Ruth (album) =

Studio album by Nana Grizol
- Released: January 10, 2010
- Recorded: 2009
- Genre: Indie pop
- Length: 33:06
- Label: Orange Twin

Nana Grizol chronology
Love It Love It (2008)	Ruth (2010)	Tacoma Center 1600 + Nightlights I-III (2014)

Professional ratings
Review scores
Source	Rating
PinPointMusic	3.7/5.0
PopMatters	7/10 stars

Ruth is the second studio album by American indie folk group Nana Grizol. It was released by Orange Twin on January 10, 2010.

== Track listing ==
All music is composed by Nana Grizol.

No.	Title	Length
1.	"Cynicism"	2:28
2.	"Galaxies"	2:55
3.	"Blackbox"	3:47
4.	"Atoms"	2:44
5.	"Gave On"	1:26
6.	"Grady And Dubose"	1:56
7.	"From Here"	3:01
8.	"Alice And Gertrude"	3:28
9.	"Arthur Hall"	2:19
10.	"For Things That Haven't Come Yet"	4:11
11.	"Sands"	4:51
Total length:		33:06

== Personnel ==
Music

- Theodore Hilton – vocals, electric guitar, acoustic guitar
- Laura Carter – drums, trumpet, clarinet
- Matte Cathcart – drums
- Robbie Cucchiaro – trumpet, euphonium, guitar, bari sax
- Jared Gandy – bass, guitar
- Patrick Jennings – piano, rhodes
- Madeline Adams – vocals, bass
- Laurel Hill – help
- Scott Spillane – help

Production

- Derek Almstead – engineer, mastering, producer
- Nana Grizol – producer

Writing Help

- James Baldwin
- Allen Ginsberg
- Michael Schneeweis
- Ryan Woods
