= Love It Love It =

Studio album by Nana Grizol
- Released: May 13, 2008
- Recorded: July 2007
- Genre: Indie pop
- Length: 29:03
- Label: Orange Twin

Nana Grizol chronology
Love It Love It (2008)	Ruth (2010)

Professional ratings
Review scores
Source	Rating
AllMusic	3.5/5 stars

Love It Love It is the debut studio album by American indie folk group Nana Grizol. It was released by Orange Twin on May 13, 2008.

== Reception ==
The group was profiled on NPR Music on August 19, 2008, where host Robin Hilton described the album's 11 tracks as:

"...wistful observations on heartache, transient friendships, and the need to bring a little bit more love into the world. It may be a bit too precious for some listeners, but it's uplifting and inspired overall."

== Track listing ==
All songs written by Theo Hilton, except where noted.

No.	Title	Length
1.	"Circles 'Round the Moon"	1:48
2.	"Tambourine-N-Thyme"	2:29
3.	"Less Than the Air" (Dave Dondero)	3:37
4.	"Motion in the Ocean"	2:59
5.	"Voices Echo Down Thee Halls"	2:30
6.	"Stop and Smell Thee Roses"	2:11
7.	"Tiny Rainbows"	2:09
8.	"Everything You Ever Hoped or Worked For"	2:58
9.	"Broken Cityscapes"	2:55
10.	"The Ideas That Everything Could Possibly Be Said"	4:35
11.	"Untitled"	0:52
Total length:		29.03

== Credits ==
Performers

- Theo Hilton – vocals, electric guitar, acoustic guitar
- Madeline Adams – vocals, bass
- Matte Cathcart – drums
- Laura Carter – trumpet, clarinet
- Patrick Jennings – piano, rhodes
- Margaret Child – glockenspiel, tambourine
- Kate Grace Mitchell – trumpet
- Ian Rickert – clarinet, harmonica
- Jared Gandy – Performer

Production

- Jeff Capurso – mastering
- Asa Leffer – engineer
- Sam Phillips – artwork
