= Twitching in Time =

Studio album by Elf Power
- Released: May 12, 2017
- Genre: Indie pop, indie rock, alternative rock
- Length: 44:42
- Label: Orange Twin

Elf Power chronology
Sunlight on the Moon (2013)	Twitching in Time (2017)	Artificial Countrysides (2022)

Professional ratings
Review scores
Source	Rating
AllMusic	4/5 stars
The Spill Magazine	4/5 stars

Twitching in Time is the thirteenth album by the American indie rock band Elf Power. It was released in 2017 on Orange Twin.

== Track listing ==
All tracks are written by Andrew Rieger except where noted.

No.	Title	Writer(s)	Length
1.	"Halloween Out Walking"		2:47
2.	"Ten Dollars on the Ground"		3:32
3.	"Watery Shreds"	Laura Carter	2:56
4.	"The Cat Trapped in the Wall"		3:14
5.	"Sniper in the Balcony"		3:22
6.	"All Things Combined"		3:00
7.	"In a Room"		2:50
8.	"Too Many Things in My Hands"		3:06
9.	"Cycling Aimlessly"		2:42
10.	"Cold Vines"		3:28
11.	"Twitching in Time"		3:28
12.	"Melted Down"		2:49
13.	"Withered Husk"		3:28
14.	"Gorging on the Feast"		4:11
Total length:			44:42

== Personnel ==
- Andrew Rieger – guitars, vocals, flute, zanzithophone, keyboards, bass, percussion
- Laura Carter – keyboards, vocals, Moog synthesizer, zanzithophone, loops
- Matthew Garrison – bass, vocals
- Peter Alvanos – drums, vocals, percussion
- Davey Wrathgabar – guitars, vocals
