= Theo Hilton =

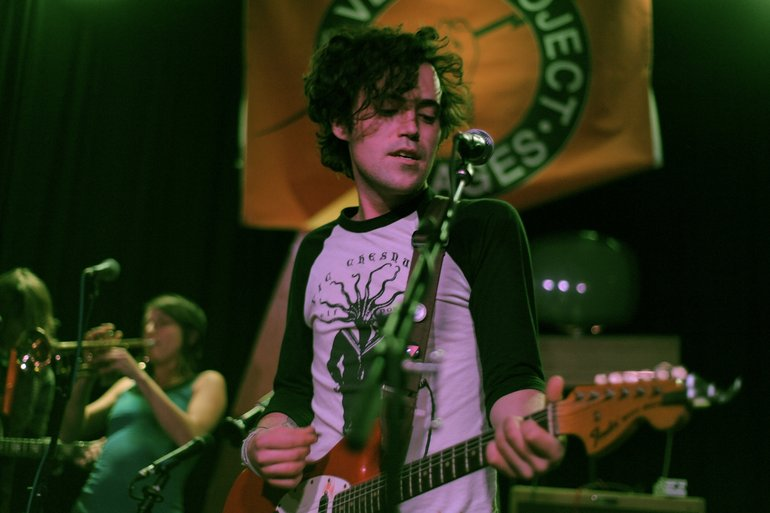

Background information
- Also known as: Theo Grizol
- Born
- Origin: Athens, Georgia
- Genres: Indie folk; folk punk; indie rock; lo-fi
- Occupations: Singer-songwriter; musician
- Instruments: Drums; guitar; vocals
- Years active: 2003–present
- Member of: Nana Grizol
- Formerly of: Defiance, Ohio; Shark Shark; Zumm Zumm

Theo Hilton is an American musician and singer-songwriter. He is best known for his work as drummer and vocalist for the folk punk band Defiance, Ohio, singer-songwriter of indie folk band Nana Grizol, and co-founder of all-queer DIY record label Cruisin' Records. Born and raised in Athens, Georgia, Hilton's music is largely shaped by his experiences growing up queer in small town America.

== Career ==
=== Defiance, Ohio ===
Hilton joined the band in 2005, filling in on drums. He would later both play guitar and sing for the band.

=== Nana Grizol ===
Officially formed in 2007 by Hilton, Nana Grizol features Neutral Milk Hotel-alumni Laura Carter and Robbie Cucchiaro on horns, and a plethora of other musicians from the Athens, GA area.

=== Cruisin' Records ===
In partnership with long-time friend and fellow musician Clyde Peterson, Hilton launched Cruisin' Records in 2018, with the intention of supporting and promoting queer artists. Every band signed to Cruisin' Records consists of queer musicians or actively supports LGBT causes.

== Personal life ==
Hilton is openly queer. He currently resides in New Orleans, where he is a PhD student in cultural anthropology at Tulane University.

== Discography ==
=== With Defiance, Ohio ===
Albums
Release date	Title	Label	Format
April 13, 2006	The Great Depression	No Idea Records	CD, LP
December 4, 2007	The Fear, the Fear, the Fear	No Idea Records	CD, LP
July 6, 2010	Midwestern Minutes	No Idea Records	CD, LP

Demos & EPs
Release date	Title	Label	Format
2009	Songs for the Icarus Project	Self-released	MP3
2012	The Calling	No Idea Records	MP3

=== With Shark Shark ===
EPs
Release date	Title	Label	Format
June 19, 2014	shark shark	Self-released	MP3

=== With Nana Grizol ===
Albums
Release date	Title	Label	Format
May 13, 2008	Love It Love It	Orange Twin Record Company	CD, LP
January 10, 2010	Ruth	Orange Twin Record Company	CD, LP
March 31, 2017	Ursa Minor	Orange Twin Record Company	CD, LP
June 26, 2020	South Somewhere Else	Don Giovanni Records / Arrowhawk Records	CD, LP
December 23, 2022	Dancing Dogs	Cruisin' Records	LP, MP3

Compilations
Release date	Title	Label	Format
October 19, 2018	Theo Zumm	Cruisin' Records	CD, LP

EPs
Release date	Title	Label	Format
2014	Nightlights I-III + Tacoma Center 1600	Self-released	MP3

== See also ==
- Elephant 6
