= Madeline (musician) =

American singer/songwriter (born 1985)

- Born: Madeline Elizabeth Adams; April 9, 1985 (age 41); Athens, Georgia
- Genre: Folk
- Occupation: Singer-songwriter
- Years active: 2000–present
- Labels: Orange Twin; Plan-It-X
- Member of: Nana Grizol

Madeline Elizabeth Adams, known mononymously as Madeline, is a folk singer-songwriter from Athens, Georgia.

She has been backed on tour by the White Flag Band, composed of Jacob Morris and Caleb Darnell on bass, banjo and guitar, Theo Hilton on keys, Laura Carter on trumpet and clarinet, Robbie Cucciaro on baritone horn and trumpet, Jim Wilson on drums, and Jason Trahan on guitar.

== Overview ==
Madeline began performing her songs in 2000 in Athens, Georgia, having grown up there. For a brief time in 2001, she fronted the locally popular dance-pop band Sugar Shakers with Tim Schreiber (now known as Timmy Tumble). She self-released her first album, Kissing and Dancing, in 2002, which was later re-released by Plan-It-X Records. In 2006, she recorded The Slow Bang with Matthew Houck, also known as Phosphorescent, at his house in Athens for local label Orange Twin Records. On March 10, 2009, her third full-length album White Flag was released, having been recorded over a three-year period. Madeline described the recording of White Flag to Paste as "totally different" compared to her previous albums:

For my past recordings, I usually sit down with a producer, and I play my song, and then the producer and I accompany them on various instruments. But this time, I recorded it mostly with a full band, so the recording process was completely different.

As of April 1, 2009, she handled the booking of her own shows and bartended on the side. As of 2017, she lives in Atlanta and works in advertising, copywriting and social media, and fronts the band Flamingo Shadow.

== Musical style ==
Madeline's writing has been described as "lyrics to be pored over", her voice as "haunting".

Madeline has also been likened to the Softies, Kimya Dawson, and the Carter Family, as well as 1970s superstars Joni Mitchell and Karen Carpenter.

== Discography ==
=== Albums ===
Year	Title	Label	Format	Other information
2001	Madeline	Self-released	CD-R	
2003	Kissing and Dancing	Plan-It-X Records	12" LP / CD	
2006	The Slow Bang	Orange Twin Records	CD	
2009	White Flag	Orange Twin Records	12" LP / CD	
2011	Black Velvet	This Will Be Our Summer.	12" LP / CD	
2012	B Sides	This Will Be Our Summer.	Download	Unreleased material recorded between 2000 and 2008.
2018	Earth Music	Irrelevant Music	Download, cassette	Debut album by Flamingo Shadow

=== EPs ===
Year	Title	Label	Format	Other information
2002	The Sugar Shakers	DcBaltimore	CD-R	Self-titled EP by The Sugar Shakers
2003	Madeline / The Dead Bird	Plan-It-X Records	CD	Split EP with The Dead Bird
2004	Madeline / Saw Wheel	Hill Billy Stew Records	7" vinyl	
2005	The Demise of Madame Butterfly	Self-released	CD-R	
2006	5 Songs Selected From a New Album	Self-released	CD-R	
2008	Tour EP	Whprwhil Records	CD-R	Split EP with Karl Blau and Your Heart Breaks
2015	Vibe Control	Self-released	Download	Debut EP by Flamingo Shadow
