= Come On (EP) =

EP by Elf Power
- Released: 1999
- Recorded: 1999
- Genre: Indie pop, indie rock
- Label: Orange Twin
- Producer: Chris Bishop

Come On is a seven-track EP by indie rock band Elf Power. It features six cover songs and a remix of the Elf Power song "Separating Fault". The EP was later included on the 2002 Elf Power album Nothing's Going to Happen.

== Track listing ==
1. "Upside Down" (Jesus and Mary Chain)
2. "Hot Love" (Marc Bolan/T.Rex)
3. "Cotton Crown" (Sonic Youth)
4. "You Make Me Die" (Billy Childish)
5. "Felt Good to Burn" (Flaming Lips)
6. "Listening to the Higsons" (Robyn Hitchcock)
7. "Separating Fault"
8. "Separating Fault (Live)"
