= Nothing's Going to Happen =

Studio album by Elf Power
- Released: October 1, 2002
- Genres: Indie pop, indie rock
- Length: 52:05
- Label: Orange Twin

Elf Power chronology
Creatures (2002)	Nothing's Going to Happen (2002)	Walking with the Beggar Boys (2004)

Professional ratings
Review scores
Source	Rating
Allmusic	3/5 stars
Pitchfork	(8.1/10)

Nothing's Going to Happen is the sixth full-length album released by indie rock band Elf Power. It is a combination of previously unrecorded cover songs from a variety of the band's favorite artists, from T. Rex to The Flaming Lips, as well as a reissue of their EP Come On.

== Track listing ==
No.	Title	Length
1.	"Nothing's Going to Happen" (featuring Tall Dwarfs)	5:39
2.	"Why Can't I Touch It" (featuring Buzzcocks)	3:43
3.	"Shadows in Vain" (featuring Tubeway Army)	3:01
4.	"Weird on the Avenue" (featuring The Frogs (band))	1:38
5.	"Pay to Cum" (featuring Bad Brains)	1:40
6.	"Hybrid Moments" (featuring Misfits)	1:36
7.	"Never Talking to You Again" (featuring Hüsker Dü)	1:51
8.	"I Walked With the Zombie" (featuring Roky Erickson)	2:48
9.	"Unforced Peace" (featuring Roky Erickson)	2:24
10.	"I Love the Living You" (featuring Roky Erickson)	2:37
11.	"Upside Down" (featuring Jesus and Mary Chain)	2:56
12.	"Hot Love" (featuring Marc Bolan, T. Rex)	4:36
13.	"Cotton Crown" (featuring Sonic Youth)	2:45
14.	"You Make Me Die" (featuring Billy Childish)	2:19
15.	"Felt Good to Burn" (featuring Flaming Lips)	2:21
16.	"Listening to the Higsons" (featuring Robyn Hitchcock)	10:11
Total length:		52:05
