= Colour Green =

Studio album by Sibylle Baier
- Released: 7 February 2006
- Recorded: 1970–1973, Germany
- Genre: Folk
- Length: 32:42
- Label: Orange Twin Records

Professional ratings
Review scores
Source	Rating
Allmusic	4.0/5 stars

Colour Green is the debut and only album by German actress and singer-songwriter Sibylle Baier. It was originally recorded between 1970 and 1973, but was not released until 2006.

== Background ==
Colour Green was recorded on a reel-to-reel audio tape recorder in Baier's home in Germany. Part of the album was inspired by a trip through Europe by Baier and her friend Claudine. This particular journey yielded the writing of the track "Remember the Day," reportedly the first that Baier wrote.

The instrumentation on most of the album is minimal, featuring only Baier's voice and nylon-string guitar. However, the last track on the album, "Give Me a Smile”, features an orchestrated string section and an electronic organ, and Baier plays a steel-string guitar instead of a nylon-strung one.

Some 30 years after these songs were recorded, Baier's son Robby compiled a CD from these recordings to give to family members as presents. He also gave a copy to Dinosaur Jr's J Mascis, who in turn passed it along to the Orange Twin record label. Orange Twin released the album in February 2006.

== Usage in popular media ==
The track "Forget About" was used in the final scene of the film The Drama.

== Track listing ==
1. "Tonight" – 2:26
2. "I Lost Something in the Hills" – 3:27
3. "The End" – 2:27
4. "Softly" – 2:54
5. "Remember the Day" – 1:43
6. "Forget About" – 2:31
7. "William" – 2:21
8. "Says Elliott" – 2:25
9. "Colour Green" – 2:25
10. "Driving" – 2:30
11. "Girl" – 1:43
12. "Wim" – 2:01
13. "Forgett" – 2:10
14. "Give Me a Smile" – 1:54

== Personnel ==
- Sibylle Baier – vocals, guitar
- Derek Almstead – mastering
- Uncredited – string section, electronic organ
