= Walking with the Beggar Boys =

Studio album by Elf Power
- Released: April 6, 2004
- Genres: Indie pop, indie rock
- Length: 32:00
- Label: Orange Twin

Elf Power chronology
Nothing's Going to Happen (2003)	Walking with the Beggar Boys (2004)	Back to the Web (2006)

Walking with the Beggar Boys is the 2004 release by indie rock band Elf Power.

It has a more Southern rock-influenced sound than its more psychedelic predecessors.

"Never Believe" was released as a single prior to the album's release, and a video was created as well.

Vic Chestnutt was featured on the title track, singing and playing guitar.

== Critical reception ==
Professional ratings
Aggregate scores
Source	Rating
Metacritic	69/100
Review scores
Source	Rating
Allmusic	4/5 stars
The A.V. Club	(positive)
Pitchfork	(5.7/10)
Stylus Magazine	(D)
Tiny Mix Tapes	3.5/5 stars

Walking with the Beggar Boys was met with "generally favorable" reviews from critics. At Metacritic, which assigns a weighted average rating out of 100 to reviews from mainstream publications, this release received an average score of 69, based on 14 reviews.

== Track listing ==
No.	Title	Writer(s)	Length
1.	"Never Believe"	Paul Barker; Al Jourgensen; Andrew Rieger	2:35
2.	"Walking with the Beggar Boys"	Rieger	2:50
3.	"Drawing Flies"	Matt Cameron; Rieger	2:29
4.	"The Stranger"	Rieger	2:14
5.	"Hole in My Shoe"	Rieger	3:28
6.	"The Cracks"	Rieger	2:59
7.	"Evil Eye"	Rieger	4:00
8.	"Don't Let It Be"	Rieger	2:41
9.	"Invisible Men"	Rieger	2:27
10.	"Empty Pictures"	Rieger	3:40
11.	"Big Thing"	Rieger	2:37
