= Jaro Hess =

Painter and landscape designer

- Born: Jaroslav Hes; March 22, 1889 near Prague
- Died: 1979 (aged 89–90); Grand Rapids, Michigan
- Occupations: painter, landscape architect
- Known for: The Land of Make Believe painting

Jaro Hess (born Jaroslav Hes; March 27, 1889 – 1979) was a painter and landscape designer who spent much of his career in Grand Rapids, Michigan. He is best known for his painting The Land of Make Believe, which features 60 images that reference different fairy tales and nursery rhymes. While Hess never achieved great fame for his painting during his life, prints of The Land of Make Believe remain popular to this day.

== Early life ==
Accounts typically state Hess was born in Prague. However, his WWI draft card lists his place of birth as Karlshütte, Bohemia, Austria. In 1910, at the age of 21, he emigrated to the United States.

Much of Hess's early life remains unknown. In an interview given in 1923, Hess claimed that he had received a degree in metallurgical engineering in Prague and then joined the French Foreign Legion in Algiers. He stated that his time in the French Foreign Legion "was the worst five days of [his] life." He further claimed that he ultimately stowed away to Marseilles and later completed his military service in the Austrian Army.

Hess states he traveled from New York to Pittsburgh and later the Midwest, working odd jobs. He ultimately settled in Grand Rapids in the 1920s, where he worked primarily as a landscape architect.

== Painting ==
Hess is best remembered for his painting The Land of Make Believe, which makes references to at least forty different fairy tales and nursery rhymes, such as "Goldilocks and the Three Bears" and "Jack the Giant Killer's House." According to a research team at Calvin College, Hess made the painting in 1933, although many sources list the date of origin as 1930.

In a 1972 interview, Hess claimed the picture was shown at Chicago's 1933 Century of World Progress children's literature area. However, the children's literature area, known as the "Story Cove" does not list him as a participant, nor is the map visible in available pictures of the space.

The Land of Make Believe was first licensed to The Child's Wonderland Company of Grand Rapids, Michigan. Currently, the Hagstrom Map Company holds the rights to the image, which they license to Rosen-Ducat, who prints a modified version of the image.

During the 1950s, the image was modified to change the figure of "The Wandering Jew" to simply "The Wanderer."

Hess tried to capitalize on the success of The Land of Make Believe with a similar The Land of the New Testament, to be sold to Sunday schools. An advertisement from the time from "Jaro Hess Studios" states "Jaro Hess, the originator of the internationally famous and well-known children's map, 'The Land of Make-Believe,' has created a new pictorial map ... Because of its wide appeal dealers are finding this color map 'The Land of the New Testament' one of the best-selling items." However, his other paintings never garnered the popularity of The Land of Make Believe.

After retirement in 1950, Hess devoted his time to painting. He produced several works during this time, the most notable of which was The Jungle II. The painting features a lush jungle landscape populated with strange and peculiar creatures.

While Hess never achieved major critical or commercial success during his lifetime, his work was shown during his lifetime in 1973 at the Grand Rapids Art Museum in an exhibition entitled "Three Self-Taught Painters." After his death in 1977, his work was displayed in 1981 and 1994 at the Grand Rapids Art Museum.

== Landscaping ==
Hess was best known during his life for his work as a landscape architect. He first worked at his father-in-law's plant nursery, Hardy Plant Farm. He later took over the business. In the 1920s, Hess was hired to do landscaping for Edmund Booth, the founding manager and editor of The Grand Rapids Press.

Hess claimed to have been elected an honorary fellow of the Royal Horticultural Society of London for his hybridization of delphiniums. However, this claim has not been verified.

== Personal life ==
On December 19, 1914, Hess married Hazel Irvine in Bay City, Michigan. They had two children: Vivien, born September 6, 1916, and Lorraine, born February 19, 1920. Hess and his wife were divorced on November 26, 1929. The cause of divorce was listed as "cruelty and non-support."

Hess was deeply interested in the paranormal, a theme which frequently reappears in his paintings. He wrote many letters to Dr. Joseph Banks Rhine, a professor at Duke University and leader in the study of Extrasensory Perception (ESP).

== The Land of Make Believe in Pop Culture ==
In an interview with Esquire in 2018, Simpsons creator Matt Groening cited The Land of Make Believe as a key inspiration behind his twisted fairy tale animated series Disenchantment. Groening is quoted as saying, "There was a very spooky poster from 1930 that hung in the den of my parents' house called The Land of Make Believe, by an artist named Jaro Hess. It scared the hell out of me, but I loved it. I actually tracked it down and hung it in my kitchen to scare my children. But it's always been an inspiration to me."

In 1997, the indie rock band Elf Power released their second album When the Red King Comes, a concept album about the Red King's kingdom. The cover art for the album featured a segment of The Land of Make Believe.

== See also ==
- Bernard Sleigh
