= Winter Is Coming (disambiguation) =

"Winter Is Coming" is the pilot episode and motto of House Stark, on the HBO television series Game of Thrones.

Winter is Coming may also refer to:

- Game of Thrones: Winter Is Coming, a video game based on the show
- Winter Is Coming: The Medieval World of Game of Thrones, a book written by Carolyne Larrington
- Winter Is Coming, a website founded on the works of George R. R. Martin, which grew to encompass the wider world of sci-fi and fantasy
- Winter Is Coming: Why Vladimir Putin and the Enemies of the Free World Must Be Stopped, a book written by Russian chess grandmaster Garry Kasparov
- "Winter Is Coming", a 2007 song by Radical Face
- AEW Winter Is Coming, an annual professional wrestling event by All Elite Wrestling (AEW)

== See also ==
- The Winter Is Coming, an album by Elf Power
- "Winter Is Coming Here Soon", a song from Jimmy Barnes' Och Aye the G'nu children's album
