= Circles Round The Moon =

Circles Round the Moon can refer to a song on the album:

- Love It Love It by American indie folk group Nana Grizol
- Scream if You Wanna Go Faster by British singer Geri Halliwell
