= Midwestern Minutes =

Studio album by Defiance, Ohio
- Released: July 6, 2010
- Recorded: March/April, 2010, 2009
- Genre: Folk punk
- Length: 27:42
- Label: No Idea Records
- Producer: Mike Bridavsky, Defiance, Ohio

Defiance, Ohio chronology
The Fear, the Fear, the Fear (2007)	Midwestern Minutes (2010)	The Calling (2012)

Professional ratings
Review scores
Source	Rating
Punknews.org	link
Sputnik Music	link

Midwestern Minutes is Defiance, Ohio's fourth full-length album. It is available for free on the band's website. The album has received considerable airplay in Australia, courtesy of Triple R's Bullying The Jukebox program, for which it topped their 'Best Of 2010' list.

== Recording ==
All of the songs recorded, mixed, and mastered in March and April 2010 at Russian Recording in Bloomington, IN, except "Diamonds Theme Song" and "Everyone Else on the Other Side" which were recorded in 2009 by the Defiance, Ohio.

== Critical reception ==
Midwestern Minutes was met to positive critical acclaim. Darren of punknews.org gave the album 4 out of 5 stars and remarked that the album was "arguably the band's best album to date". Reviewers noted that the album was a departure form the band's rawer punk roots, and that the band has matured into their own unique sound.

== Track listing ==
No.	Title	Length
1.	"Floodwaters"	2:01
2.	"The White Shore"	2:44
3.	"A Lot to Do"	2:24
4.	"Cigarettes"	0:53
5.	"Hairpool"	4:28
6.	"Dissimilarity Index"	3:04
7.	"The Reason"	2:50
8.	"Her Majesty's Midwestern Islands"	2:10
9.	"Diamonds Theme Song"	0:51
10.	"You Are Loved"	3:08
11.	"Everyone Else on the Other Side"	3:09
Total length:		27:42

== Credits ==
Music

- Theo Hilton – drums, guitar, piano, vocals
- Geoff Hing – guitar, vocals
- Sherri Miller – banjo, cello, vocals
- Will Staler – drums, guitar, mandolin, vocals
- Ryan Woods – bass, upright bass, vocals

Production

- Mike Bridavsky – engineer, mastering, mixing
- Defiance, Ohio – producer
- Keith McGraw – assistant engineer
