= A Dream in Sound =

Studio album by Elf Power
- Released: 1999
- Recorded: 1998
- Genre: Indie pop, indie rock
- Label: Arena Rock Recording Company/Elephant 6
- Producer: Dave Fridmann

Elf Power chronology
When the Red King Comes (1997)	A Dream in Sound (1999)	The Winter Is Coming (2000)

Professional ratings
Review scores
Source	Rating
AllMusic	4/5 stars
The Encyclopedia of Popular Music	4/5 stars
NME	3.5/5 stars
Spin	7/10

A Dream in Sound is an album by the indie rock band Elf Power. It was released in 1999 via Arena Rock Recording Company/Elephant 6.

"Jane" was released as a single on Shifty Disco.

== Production ==
The album was produced by Dave Fridmann. It was recorded in Fredonia, New York.

== Critical reception ==
Trouser Press wrote that "with the almost orchestral sweep of this now-richly textured music, A Dream in Sound is a huge step beyond Elf Power’s relatively thin earlier albums, but Fridmann’s fingerprints are all over it, making the album considerably less distinctive and original." The Chicago Tribune thought that "Andrew Rieger's sweetly plaintive voice gives the band's lilting melodies an air of hopeful melancholy, and if a few of the band's lyrical flights of fancy don't quite lift off, the songs on this disc rarely fail to charm."

== Track listing ==
1. "Will My Feet Still Carry Me Home?"
2. "High Atop the Silver Branches"
3. "Willowy Man"
4. "Olde Tyme Waves"
5. "Jane"
6. "All the Passengers"
7. "We Dream in Sound"
8. "Carnival"
9. "The Well"
10. "Noble Experiment" (Thinking Fellers Union Local 282)
11. "Simon (The Bird with the Candy Bar Head)"
12. "Rising and Falling in a Little World"
13. "O What a Beautiful Dream"
14. "Untitled Instrumental Track"
