= Admonishing the Bishops =

EP by Thinking Fellers Union Local 282
- Released: October 26, 1993
- Recorded: Coast Recorders, San Francisco, California
- Genres: Indie rock, experimental rock
- Length: 19:15
- Label: Matador
- Producer: Thinking Fellers Union Local 282, Bob Weston

Thinking Fellers Union Local 282 chronology
Where's Officer Tuba (1993)	Admonishing the Bishops (1993)	The Funeral Pudding (1994)

Professional ratings
Review scores
Source	Rating
Allmusic	3/5 stars

Admonishing the Bishops is an EP by the band Thinking Fellers Union Local 282, released as a CD and 10" vinyl record on October 26, 1993, through Matador Records. The EP's title refers to Alan and Rick Bishop of the Sun City Girls with whom the Thinking Fellers had toured with the previous year.

== Track listing ==
All tracks are written by Thinking Fellers Union Local 282.

No.	Title	Length
1.	"Hurricane"	6:14
2.	"Undertaker"	3:23
3.	"Million Dollars"	4:14
4.	"Father"	5:24
Total length:		19:15

== Personnel ==
Thinking Fellers Union Local 282

- Mark Davies – guitar, bass guitar, banjo, vocals
- Anne Eickelberg – bass guitar, vocals
- Brian Hageman – guitar, mandolin, vocals
- Jay Paget – drums
- Hugh Swarts – guitar, vocals

Production and additional personnel

- Gibbs Chapman – mixing, recording
- Thinking Fellers Union Local 282 – production, mixing, recording
- Lexa Walsh – illustrations
- Bob Weston – production, engineering
