= Shut Yer Dirty Little Mouth! =

2001 film by Robert Taicher

Shut Yer Dirty Little Mouth
- Directed by: Robert Taicher
- Screenplay by: Charles Schneider
- Based on: Shut Up Little Man by Gregg Gibbs
- Produced by: Jeff Maynard
- Starring: Glenn Shadix
- Cinematography: Chris Manley
- Edited by: J.A. Gold; Jenni Gold; Mary Plummer
- Music by: Joseph Duerr
- Production company: SLYDM Productions
- Release date: 2001
- Running time: 75 minutes
- Country: United States
- Language: English

Shut Yer Dirty Little Mouth! is a 2001 American comedy film starring Glenn Shadix. It is based on Gregg Gibbs' play Shut Up Little Man.

== Plot ==
A comical look into the lives of Raymond and Peter, two elderly alcoholics who do nothing, but rant, rave and argue with each other in an explosive, yet contained environment.

== Cast ==
- Gill Gayle as Raymond
- Glenn Shadix as Peter
- Robert Musgrave as Tony
- Pat Quinn
- Christopher Cameron as Policeman 2
- Rachel Niebur as Downstair Neighbor
