= Shoot Out =

1971 film by Henry Hathaway

- Theatrical poster
- Directed by: Henry Hathaway
- Screenplay by: Marguerite Roberts
- Based on: (based on the novel) ("The Lone Cowboy") by Will James
- Produced by: Hal B. Wallis
- Starring: Gregory Peck
- Cinematography: Earl Rath
- Edited by: Archie Marshek
- Music by: Dave Grusin
- Production company: Hal Wallis Productions
- Distributed by: Universal Pictures
- Release date: October 13, 1971
- Running time: 94 minutes
- Country: United States
- Language: English
- Budget: $1.19 million

Shoot Out is a 1971 American Western film directed by Henry Hathaway and starring Gregory Peck. The film is adapted from Will James's 1930 novel, The Lone Cowboy. The film was produced, directed, and written by the team that delivered the Oscar-winning film True Grit.

This was the penultimate of the 65 films directed by Hathaway.

== Plot ==
Clay Lomax is released from prison after serving seven years for robbing a bank. He goes looking for his former crime partner, Sam Foley, who shot Lomax in the back as they ran from the bank and left him to be arrested. Learning of his release, Foley hires a trio of young thugs—Pepe, Skeeter and Bobby Jay Jones— for the promise of $100 (5 double eagle gold pieces) to track Lomax's movements. Foley tells Bobby Jay they are not to kill Lomax; if they do, they will not be paid the $100. Lomax locates an old friend, Trooper, a former U.S. Army cavalry soldier now using a wheelchair, running a saloon/hotel in a town called Weed. Lomax offers Trooper money for information about his ex-partner. The thugs catch up to Lomax at Trooper's and force Alma, a prostitute/saloon girl working for the gruff but kindly old soldier, to spend the night with them. They wind up disturbing Lomax from his sleep with his old girlfriend Emma with the racket in the neighboring room, and have an altercation in the corridor.

Later Lomax meets a train at the whistle stop to meet a former lady companion who was bringing a large sum of money that she had held for him all these years. But surprisingly, the conductor, Mr. Frenatore, brings out a 7-year-old girl, Decky Ortega, who had accompanied the woman on her train journey. The woman had died a few days before in a distant town leaving the girl an orphan. Lomax finally pulls the child off the train. The conductor hands him a wad of cash saying that if he hadn't retrieved and taken custody of the kid, the money would have gone towards her support when the conductor turned her over to a sheriff in the next large town on the line. Lomax tries to find someone to take care of Decky, but is unsuccessful. Meanwhile, the thugs mistreat and leave bruises on Alma, then vandalize the hotel/saloon as the old handicapped owner demands restitution. Led by Bobby Jay, they fatally shoot Trooper and rob the saloon, taking Lomax's money and Alma with them, before continuing to follow Lomax. Lomax returns, learning of Trooper's death and that he mentioned the location "Gun Hill" with his dying breath.

During the journey to Gun Hill, Lomax and stubborn little Decky bond closer, especially after he throws her in a stream to wash and scrub her, then gently dries and warms her by the campfire. She asks him if he is her father which he denies, but he knew her mother well and the paternal implication is clear. One night, the gang of thugs watch Lomax in his camp, but he hears them and disarms them. When he finds out the purpose of their trailing mission, he tells them to go ahead to Foley in Gun Hill and tell him that he is coming for him. Later, a rainstorm forces Lomax and Decky to take shelter at the ranch house of a lonely widow named Juliana Farrell, who quickly becomes infatuated with Lomax and offers to watch over Decky. The thugs catch up to them later in the night and take everyone prisoner. Bobby Jay orders Pepe to go down the trail and watch for the return of Farrell's four ranch hands, who had gone into town. Bobby Jay then gets drunk, knocks out Lomax and terrorizes the young mother by saying he was going to shoot a target off her son's head. but uses Decky instead. Later, he kills saloon girl Alma. Lomax wakes up to see part of this and gets behind Skeeter whom Bobby Jay accidentally kills while shooting at Lomax.

Bobby Jay grabs Decky and flees the house on his horse. The horse goes lame as he approaches Pepe on the trail. When Pepe refuses to give up his horse Bobby Jay kills him. Decky takes advantage of his distraction to escape into the night. Her yells fail to alert Lomax as he rides past chasing Bobby Jay, but she is picked up and taken back to the ranch by Juliana and her son who are following behind Lomax. Now alone, Bobby Jay has ridden ahead to warn Foley and get his promised money, but gets greedy at seeing the amount of cash in Foley's safe. Foley tries to reach for a gun, and is shot dead. Bobby Jay is surprised by Lomax, who arrives while Bobby Jay is gathering his loot. Now enraged and seeking revenge for all that Bobby Jay has done, Lomax terrorizes Bobby Jay by shooting things off of his head while demanding Decky's whereabouts. When he confesses that she ran off into the night and he has no idea where she is, Lomax has the housekeeper place a cartridge on top of Bobby Jay's head and tells him that either the cartridge will explode and kill him, or Bobby Jay will not be fast enough to quick draw his gun to kill Lomax. Bobby Jay tries to outdraw Lomax but cannot and is shot dead by the far more experienced gunslinger. Lomax leaves the money with Foley and Bobby Jay's bodies, tells the housekeeper to go get the law, and then goes to find Decky back at Juliana's house.

== Cast ==
- Gregory Peck as Clay Lomax
- Pat Quinn as Juliana
- Robert F. Lyons as Bobby Jay
- Susan Tyrrell as Alma
- Jeff Corey as Trooper
- James Gregory as Sam Foley
- Rita Gam as Emma
- Dawn Lyn as Decky
- Pepe Serna as Pepe
- John Davis Chandler as Skeeter (as John Chandler)
- Paul Fix as Brakeman
- Arthur Hunnicutt as Homer Page
- Nicolas Beauvy as Dutch

== Production ==
Henry Hathaway had long wanted to make a version of The Champ in a Western setting and planned to do one with Gary Cooper before Cooper's death. He says Wallis arranged to make the film with Gregory Peck who Hathaway thought was too "cold" for the part. He was also unhappy Wallis cast 30 year olds as the villains when the director wanted actors around 15 and 16.

After filming I Walk the Line, Gregory Peck was looking for a successful film as a follow-up. Believing teaming with the director of True Grit, Henry Hathaway, along with the same producer (Hal B. Wallis) and screenwriter (Marguerite Roberts), would bring similar success, Peck started filming the project in 1970. As the film even followed a similar path - teaming a crusty gunfighter with a young girl for a companion - Peck deferred his usual salary for a percentage of the profits of the film. This allowed the production to come in on a tight budget of $1.19 million.

The film was shot on location in Santa Fe-Los Alamos area of New Mexico between October 12 and December 2, 1970. Production wrapped on December 16.

== Release ==
=== Box office ===
The film was released in Los Angeles on August 25, 1971. It was released in Sweden on August 16, 1971.

=== Critical reception ===
The film received negative reviews from a number of critics, especially in light of the blatant repetition of the formula seen in the earlier John Wayne film. Michael Kerbel from The Village Voice wrote that Shoot Out did have some semblance of True Grit, "'but the humor and charm are missing and what remains - a predictable revenge story - becomes tiresome.'" Roger Greenspun of The New York Times observed that the film was "no more than another variation of the eternal tale of the Westerner (Gregory Peck) released from prison who seeks revenge on the pal who betrayed him but is himself pursued by a hired gang of maniacal killers until a showdown in which everybody gets his except Peck, who unaccountably gets marriage and a family."

Others remarked about the slump in Gregory Peck's career: Charles Champlin of the Los Angeles Times wrote that the film "served 'mostly as a glum reminder of the inadequate use'" of the Hollywood star, while Paine Knickerbocker of the San Francisco Chronicle wrote "'Peck, m'boy, what the hell are you doing here?'" Gene Siskel of the Chicago Tribune gave the film zero stars out of four and counted five scenes in which an overhead microphone appeared in a shot, writing that there was "no excuse for such shoddy film making." He described the script as "nearly as unprofessional," being "almost a replay" of True Grit.

=== Home media release ===
The film was released on DVD on October 1, 2002.

== See also ==
- List of American films of 1971
