= Bob Dinners and Larry Noodles Present Tubby Turdner's Celebrity Avalanche =

Studio album by Thinking Fellers Union Local 282
- Released: 2001
- Studio: Lowdown, San Francisco, California
- Genre: Indie rock
- Length: 50:20
- Label: Communion
- Producer: Greg Freeman, Thinking Fellers Union Local 282

Thinking Fellers Union Local 282 chronology
| I Hope It Lands (1996) | Bob Dinners and Larry Noodles Present Tubby Turdner's Celebrity Avalanche (2001) |

Bob Dinners and Larry Noodles Present Tubby Turdner's Celebrity Avalanche is the final album by Thinking Fellers Union Local 282, released in 2001 through Communion Records.

== Production ==
Akin to past albums, the band recorded hours of rehearsals and then cut and pasted together musical passages to create songs.

== Critical reception ==
Professional ratings
Review scores
| Source | Rating |
|---|---|
| AllMusic | 4/5 stars |
| Alternative Press | 3.5/5 stars |
| The Boston Phoenix | 2.5/4 stars |
| Robert Christgau | (2-star Honorable Mention) |
| The Great Alternative & Indie Discography | 4/10 |
| Pitchfork Media | 8.6/10 |

SF Weekly called the album "the band's most layered recording yet, with no shortage of keyboards, overdubs, vocal harmonies, and perplexing noises." The East Bay Express wrote that "strange and ordinary instruments converge to make a blend of music that is at once identifiable but yet vastly different from anything you've ever heard before." Portland Mercury wrote: "Stooges riffs clash with mechanical clicks; quivering melodies frame John Bonham-style percussion blasts, then melt Velveeta-smooth into cracked-out vocal asides." CMJ New Music Monthly wrote that "an immense, haunting radiance erupts from [the band's] tortured instruments."

== Track listing ==
All tracks are written by Thinking Fellers Union Local 282.

| No. | Title | Length |
|---|---|---|
| 1. | "Another Clip" | 3:51 |
| 2. | "Sno Cone" | 5:14 |
| 3. | "You Will Be Eliminated" | 0:12 |
| 4. | "Holy Ghost" | 6:30 |
| 5. | "Everything's Impossible" | 4:06 |
| 6. | "Birth of a Rock Song" | 0:34 |
| 7. | "You in a Movie" | 5:01 |
| 8. | "Boob Feeler" | 1:02 |
| 9. | "In the Stars I Can Sizzle Like a Battery" | 3:11 |
| 10. | "El Cerrito" | 4:38 |
| 11. | "'91 Dodge Van" | 1:37 |
| 12. | "Reminder" | 0:41 |
| 13. | "The Barker" | 3:49 |
| 14. | "He Keeps Himself Fed" | 10:06 |

== Personnel ==
Thinking Fellers Union Local 282

- Mark Davies – instruments
- Anne Eickelberg – instruments
- Brian Hageman – instruments
- Jay Paget – instruments
- Hugh Swarts – instruments

Production and additional personnel

- Whitney Cowing – photography
- Saul Downs – design
- Greg Freeman – production, engineering
- John Golden – mastering
- Earl Kuck – design
- Thinking Fellers Union Local 282 – production
