= Creatures (Elf Power album) =

Studio album by Elf Power
- Released: May 7, 2002
- Genres: Indie pop, indie rock, experimental rock
- Label: spinART Records

Elf Power chronology
The Winter Is Coming (2000)	Creatures (2002)	Nothing's Going to Happen (2002)

Creatures is the fifth full-length album by indie rock group Elf Power. It was released in 2002 on spinART Records.

== Critical reception ==
Professional ratings
Aggregate scores
Source	Rating
Metacritic	77/100
Review scores
Source	Rating
AllMusic	4/5 stars
The A.V. Club	B-
Billboard	(positive)
Pitchfork	(5.5/10)
PopMatters	(6/10)

Creatures was met with "generally favourable" reviews from critics. At Metacritic, which assigns a weighted average rating out of 100 to reviews from mainstream publications, this release received an average score of 77, based on 9 reviews.

== Track listing ==
All tracks are written by Andrew Rieger.

No.	Title	Writer(s)	Length
1.	"Let the Serpent Sleep"		3:19
2.	"Everlasting Scream"		2:00
3.	"The Creature"		3:30
4.	"Palace of the Flames"		2:47
5.	"The Modern Mind"		3:27
6.	"Visions Of The Sea"		4:36
7.	"Things That Should Not Be"		2:46
8.	"Three Seeds"	Rieger; William Cullen Hart	2:45
9.	"The Haze"		4:31
10.	"Unseen Hand"		3:43
11.	"The Creature Part II"		2:16
