= Lovelyville =

Studio album by Thinking Fellers Union Local 282
- Released: December 12, 1991
- Recorded: Lowdown, San Francisco, California
- Genres: Noise rock, indie rock, experimental rock
- Length: 57:17 (CD), 46:24 (LP)
- Label: Matador
- Producers: Greg Freeman, Thinking Fellers Union Local 282

Thinking Fellers Union Local 282 chronology
Tangle (1989)	Lovelyville (1991)	Mother of All Saints (1992)

Professional ratings
Review scores
Source	Rating
AllMusic	4.5/5 stars
Robert Christgau	B−

Lovelyville is the third album by Thinking Fellers Union Local 282, released December 12, 1991, on LP and CD through Matador Records. The CD contains a set of bonus tracks titled "The Crowded Diaper".

== Recording ==
In between the studio recordings on Lovelyville are a great number of lo-fi snippets of what the band calls "Feller filler"—"murkier meanderings recorded in rehearsals on a four-track or boom box." A few bits of Feller filler are lo-fi version of the band's single "2×4s", and the song "Mother Uncle Delicious Tasty" is a sped-up voice speaking over a slowed-down recording of the song "Change Your Mind" from the band's previous album. Also present on the album are snippets of dialogue between Peter J. Haskett and Raymond Huffman from the Shut Up, Little Man! tapes that had been circulating in San Francisco.

Lovelyville also features a cover of "Green-Eyed Lady" by Sugarloaf.

== Track listing ==
Lovelyville

All tracks are written by Thinking Fellers Union Local 282, except "Green-Eyed Lady" by Jerry Corbetta and Dave Riordan.

No.	Title	Length
1.	"Four O'Clocker 2"	3:25
2.	"Not This World"	1:13
3.	"Nail in the Head"	6:04
4.	"Green-Eyed Lady"	3:44
5.	"Mother Uncle Delicious Tasty"	0:55
6.	"Street's Vibrated with the Traffic and Power Tools"	0:16
7.	"Mark My Words"	0:40
8.	"Push"	0:32
9.	"More Glee"	6:16
10.	"Big Hands"	2:45
11.	"The Marshall"	1:29
12.	"Sinking Boats"	4:48
13.	"Motorin' Flarey Jenkins"	2:34
14.	"2x4s"	4:25
15.	"Nothing Solid"	7:18
Total length:		46:24

The Crowded Diaper

No.	Title	Length
16.	"Maverick"	1:36
17.	"Wonderbread Display"	0:33
18.	"The Meat Display"	1:31
19.	"Strife Is Good"	2:08
20.	"The Marshall's Boonts"	0:32
21.	"The World Is Changing for Good"	0:53
22.	"The Demise of Craig"	3:40
Total length:		10:53 57:17

== Personnel ==
Thinking Fellers Union Local 282

- Paul Bergmann – drums
- Mark Davies – bass guitar, guitar, Casio synthesizer, drums, euphonium, vocals, trombone on "Nothing Solid"
- Anne Eickelberg – bass guitar, vocals
- Brian Hageman – guitar, viola, tape, vocals, mandolin, viola on "Nothing Solid"
- Jay Paget – drums
- Hugh Swarts – guitar, vocals

Additional musicians

- Jeff Ahrens, Alex Behr, John Frentress, Denise Funari, Brandan Kearney, Cathy Kidd, Mike Kidd, Tom Kidd, Sid Merritt, Chas Nielsen – voices on "More Glee"
- Paul Bergmann – accordion on "Nothing Solid"
- Chris Clougherty – clarinet on "Nothing Solid"
- Margaret Murray – oboe on "Nothing Solid"
- David Tholfsen – contrabass clarinet on "Nothing Solid"

Production

- Thinking Fellers Union Local 282 – production
- Greg Freeman – production, engineering
- Margaret Murray – front cover artwork
- John Frentress – back cover artwork
- Chas Nielsen – illustration
