= The Funeral Pudding =

EP by Thinking Fellers Union Local 282
- Released: February 1994
- Recorded: Turk Street Junkie Squat, San Francisco, California
- Genres: Indie rock, experimental rock
- Length: 30:21
- Label: Ajax
- Producers: Greg Freeman, Thinking Fellers Union Local 282

Thinking Fellers Union Local 282 chronology
Admonishing the Bishops (1993)	The Funeral Pudding (1994)	Strangers from the Universe (1994)

Professional ratings
Review scores
Source	Rating
Allmusic	3/5 stars

The Funeral Pudding is an EP by the band Thinking Fellers Union Local 282, released in February 1994 through Ajax Records.

== Track listing ==
All tracks are written by Thinking Fellers Union Local 282.

No.	Title	Length
1.	"Waited Too Long"	3:43
2.	"Flames Up"	3:12
3.	"Firing Squad"	1:18
4.	"***"	0:41
5.	"23 Kings Crossing"	4:26
6.	"Heavy Head"	5:02
7.	"Give Me Back My Golden Arm"	8:34
8.	"Sidewinder"	1:33
9.	"The Invitation"	1:52
Total length:		30:21

Track 4 is titled "Traffic Mule" on streaming services.

== Personnel ==
Thinking Fellers Union Local 282

- Mark Davies – instruments
- Anne Eickelberg – instruments
- Brian Hageman – instruments
- Jay Paget – instruments
- Hugh Swarts – instruments, answering machine message on "The Invitation"

Production and additional personnel

- Greg Freeman – production, engineering
- Matt Hall – painting
- Thinking Fellers Union Local 282 – production
