= In a Cave =

Studio album by Elf Power
- Released: March 25, 2008
- Genre: Indie pop, indie rock, alternative rock
- Length: 39:43
- Label: Rykodisc

Elf Power chronology
Treasures from the Trash Heap (2006)	In a Cave (2008)	Dark Developments (2008)

Professional ratings
Aggregate scores
Source	Rating
Metacritic	65/100
Review scores
Source	Rating
AllMusic	3.5/5 stars
Art Nouveau Magazine	(Positive)
Pitchfork	(5.9/10)

In a Cave is the tenth album by the American indie rock band Elf Power. It was released in 2008 on Rykodisc.

== Track listing ==
All tracks are written by Andrew Rieger, except where noted.

No.	Title	Writer(s)	Length
1.	"Owl Cut (White Flowers in the Sky"	Eric Harris, Andrew Rieger	2:24
2.	"Spiral Stairs"		3:40
3.	"A Tired Army"	Harris, Rieger	2:28
4.	"Paralyzed"		3:01
5.	"New Lord"		4:05
6.	"Softly Through the Void"		3:03
7.	"Window to Mars"	Harris, Rieger	1:21
8.	"The New Mythology"		3:51
9.	"Fried Out"		3:00
10.	"The Demon's Daughter"		3:56
11.	"Quiver and Quake"		3:10
12.	"Heads of Dust, Hearts of Lust"	Harris, Rieger	1:45
13.	"Midnight Crawls Out"		3:57
Total length:			39:43
