= Back to the Web =

Studio album by Elf Power
- Released: 2006
- Genre: Indie pop, indie rock
- Label: Rykodisc

Elf Power chronology
Walking with the Beggar Boys (2004)	Back to the Web (2006)	Treasures from the Trash Heap (2006)

Professional ratings
Aggregate scores
Source	Rating
Metacritic	67/100
Review scores
Source	Rating
AllMusic	3/5 stars
Pitchfork Media	6.4/10
PopMatters	7/10

Back to the Web is the eighth album by the indie rock band Elf Power. It was released on Rykodisc in April 2006.

== Track listing ==
1. "Come Lie Down With Me (And Sing My Song)" – 2:17
2. "An Old Familiar Scene" – 4:13
3. "Rolling Black Water" – 2:32
4. "King of Earth" – 3:03
5. "Peel Back the Moon, Beware!" – 3:34
6. "23rd Dream" – 2:08
7. "Somewhere Down the River" – 4:11
8. "The Spider and the Fly" – 3:17
9. "Forming" – 1:47
10. "All the World Is Waiting" – 3:04
11. "Under the Northern Sky" – 1:32
12. "Back to the Web" – 3:33
