= I Hope It Lands =

Studio album by Thinking Fellers Union Local 282
- Released: 1996
- Studio: Coast, San Francisco, California
- Genre: Indie rock
- Length: 40:10
- Label: Communion
- Producer: Gibbs Chapman, Thinking Fellers Union Local 282

Thinking Fellers Union Local 282 chronology
Strangers from the Universe (1994)	I Hope It Lands (1996)	Bob Dinners and Larry Noodles Present Tubby Turdner's Celebrity Avalanche (2001)

I Hope It Lands is an album by the American band Thinking Fellers Union Local 282. It was released in 1996 through Communion Records.

Music journalist Andrew Earles described the music as "experimental" and "insane", and said that it incorporates elements of "left-field pop".

== Critical reception ==
Professional ratings
Review scores
Source	Rating
AllMusic	4/5 stars
Orlando Sentinel	4/5 stars

The Orlando Sentinel called the album "another mad collection of brief sound collages, twisted pop tunes and fractured chunks of art-rock." The Santa Fe New Mexican concluded that "their songs are like singing telegrams from the distant cosmic spring that flows down to both Sonic Youth and Captain Beefheart." Trouser Press declared that "the band has the miraculous group-mind of a flock of birds, and the record flows like nothing they’ve ever done before—even the little noise-twiddles are part of the record’s grand mid-air arc."

Brian Way of AllMusic: "Although uneven in spots, I Hope It Lands ranks among the Thinking Fellers' finest. And if it didn't exactly make the band a household name, it surely pleased the band's core constituency of Bay Area and college-circuit geekrockers. And for those it didn't please, the band titled an agitated off-key instrumental just for them: 'The Rampaging Fuckers of Anything on the Crazy Shitting Planet of the Vomit Atmosphere.'" In the 2014 reference book Gimme Indie Rock, music journalist Andrew Earles wrote that the album was "one that was among the most rewarding options for indie and underground devotees looking to expand their listening pallettes."

== Track listing ==
All tracks are written by Thinking Fellers Union Local 282.

No.	Title	Length
1.	"The Poem"	1:04
2.	"A Lamb's Lullaby"	3:17
3.	"Empty Cup"	2:59
4.	"I Hope It Lands"	1:19
5.	"Lizard's Dream"	3:58
6.	"Cornad Adrift Toward Mars"	1:15
7.	"Elgin Miller"	4:27
8.	"Hudson Bottom Dance"	1:42
9.	"Jagged Ambush Bug"	0:17
10.	"Brains"	3:16
11.	"Rampaging Fuckers of Anything on the Crazy Shitting Planet of the Vomit Atmosphere"	1:16
12.	"Cuckoo at the World"	1:35
13.	"Inspector Fat Ass"	0:53
14.	"The Arbeiter"	3:04
15.	"Triple X"	5:48
16.	"Booth Delirium"	1:47
17.	"Hills"	2:13

== Personnel ==
Thinking Fellers Union Local 282

- Mark Davies – vocals, guitar, banjo
- Anne Eickelberg – vocals, bass guitar, piano
- Brian Hageman – vocals, guitar, mandolin, tape
- Jay Paget – drums, percussion, keyboards
- Hugh Swarts – vocals, guitar

Production and additional personnel

- Gibbs Chapman – production, recording
- Margaret Murray – design
- Thinking Fellers Union Local 282 – production, recording
