= Defiance, Ohio (band) =

American musical group

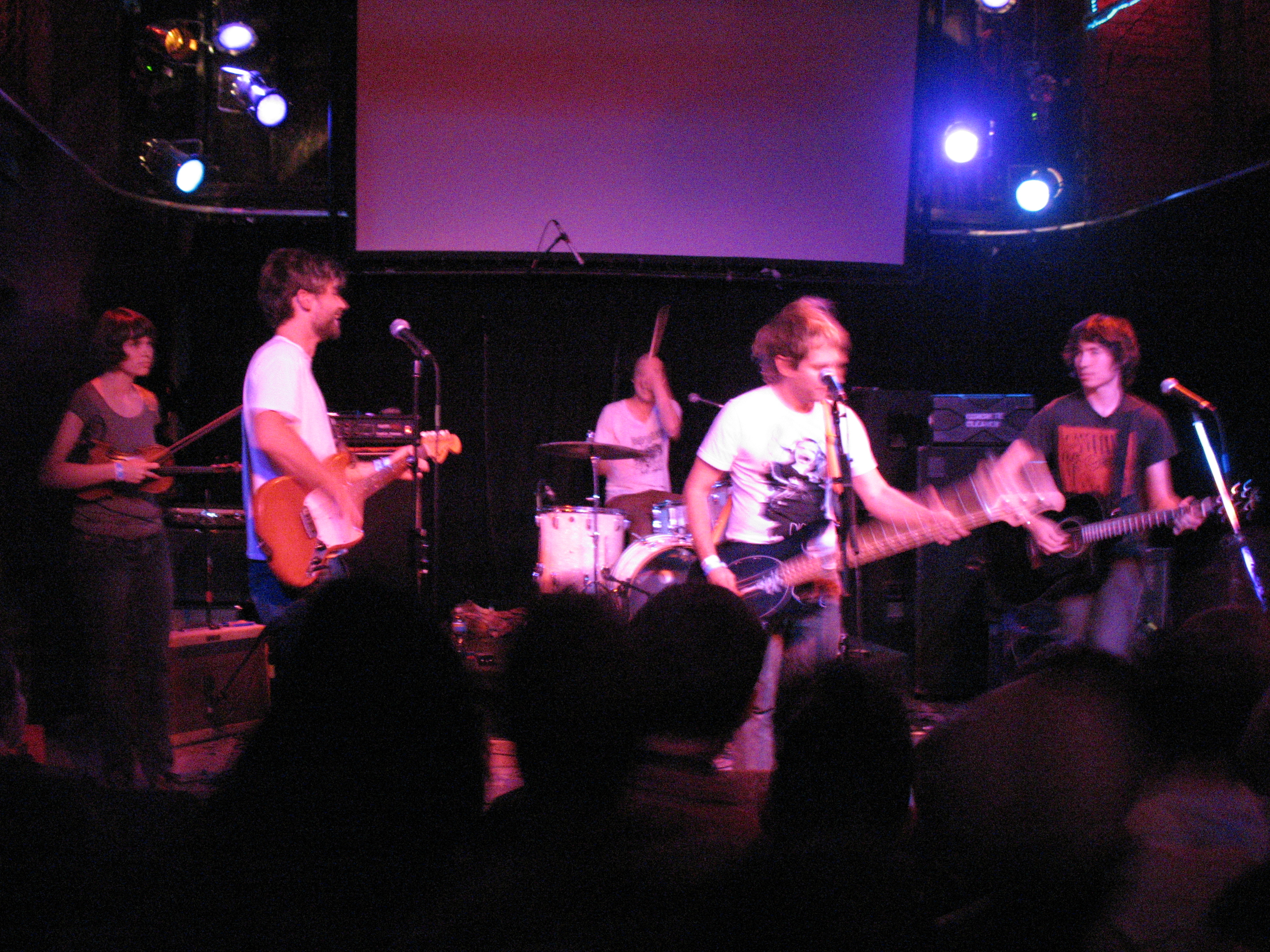
- Defiance, Ohio playing on 5/02/09

Background information
- Origin: Columbus, Ohio, United States
- Genres: Folk punk, punk rock
- Years active: 2002–2015
- Labels: Plan-It-X Records, No Idea, Anti-Creative Records, Friends and Relatives Records
- Members: Ryan Woods; Geoff Hing; Will Staler; Elizabeth "BZ" Gibbs; Sherri Miller; Theo Hilton

Defiance, Ohio was a folk punk band from Columbus, Ohio, named after the town of Defiance, Ohio, in far northwest Ohio, near Toledo. The band features a violin, cello, and double bass. They have released four full-length LPs, as well as a handful of split recordings. Their music has typically been released through smaller independent labels. They were known for their association with Plan-It-X Records, as well as anti-capitalist themes.

== History ==
Defiance, Ohio formed in 2002 as a three-piece in Columbus, Ohio with Geoff on guitar, Ryan on Bass, and Will on drums. By the time they recorded their first demo, BZ joined on violin and Sherri on cello. Their first album Share What Ya Got was self-released on CDr and on vinyl by Friends and Relatives. It was later reissued on vinyl by No Idea. The band moved to Bloomington, Indiana, released two split EPs with Ghost Mice, and One Reason and toured the US extensively, as well as Iceland. In 2004 Will moved to Eureka, California, and Theo Hilton filled in on drums. Will returned from California, and Theo stayed with the band, switching back and forth on drums and guitar.

The Great Depression was released in 2006 on No Idea. After making the decisions to work with No Idea, the band felt a need to explain their actions and maintain the sense of dialogue that they feel has been consistent in how they have conducted themselves as a band. They said that they would have preferred to release the album themselves, but that they did not have the capacity to do so while continuing to keep older releases in print.

In 2007 the band released a split EP with Environmental Youth Crunch, and a full-length The Fear, The Fear, The Fear on No Idea. Theo moved to Athens, Georgia, while the band continued to practice, tour and write together, and they toured Australia for the first time.

In 2009 the band released 4 songs as a benefit for the Icarus Project. These songs were later remastered and released as part of the full-length Midwestern Minutes in 2010. Geoff relocated to Chicago. Due to band members moving to different cities, and starting other musical projects, activity has slowed down in recent years compared to the consistent and extensive touring of earlier years. Their latest release is a 6-song EP, The Calling on No Idea. Their last tour was in 2015.

Most of the members of Defiance, Ohio also participated in other bands, such as Nana Grizol, Pretty Hot, Landlord, Pink Houses, Hymns, Disaster, High Dive, Memento Mori (now defunct), and other musical projects. Ryan Woods was also part-owner of the popular vegetarian restaurant The Owlery in Bloomington, Indiana. He has since sold off his ownership of the restaurant.

== Members ==
Current

- Ryan Woods – double bass, bass, vocals (2002–2015)
- Geoff Hing – guitar, vocals (2002–2015)
- Will Staler – drums, guitar, vocals (2002–2015)
- Elizabeth "BZ" Gibbs – violin (2002–2015)
- Sherri Miller – cello, banjo, vocals (2002–2015)
- Theo Hilton – drums, guitar, vocals (2005–2015)

== Discography ==
Albums

- Share What Ya Got (2003)
- The Great Depression (2006)
- The Fear, The Fear, The Fear (2007)
- Midwestern Minutes (2010)

Demos & EPs

- Demo (2003)
- 2003 Tour CDR (2003)
- Songs for the Icarus Project (2009) (a benefit for the Icarus Project)
- The Calling (2012)

Splits

- Ghost Mice/Defiance Ohio Split CD (2004)
- One Reason/Defiance, Ohio Split 7" (2004)
- Environmental Youth Crunch/Defiance, Ohio Split 7" (2007)
