= Bernard Sleigh =

English mural and stained-glass artist 1872–1954

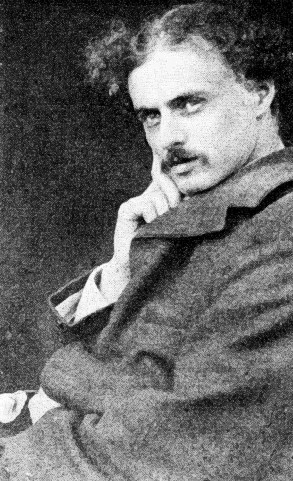

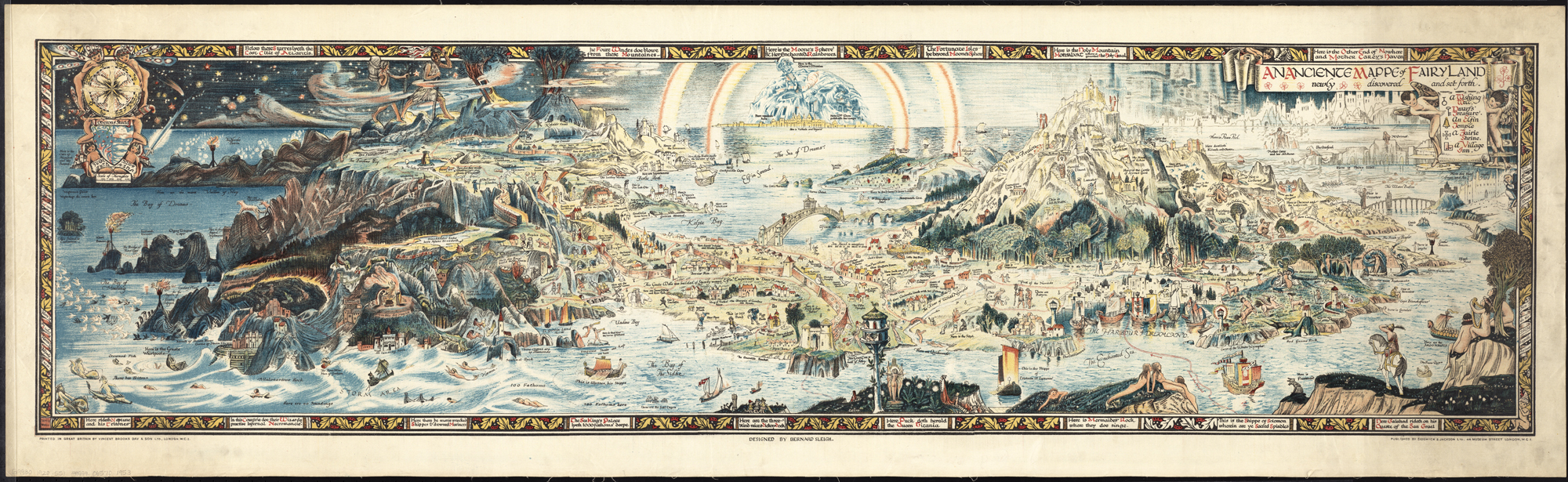
An Anciente Mappe of Fairyland, Newly Discovered and Set Forth (1917)

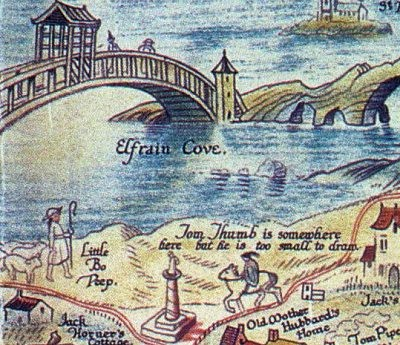
Detail from An Anciente Mappe of Fairyland, Newly Discovered and Set Forth, Library of Congress

Bernard Sleigh (1872 – 7 December 1954) was an English painter, stained-glass artist, illustrator and wood engraver, best known for his print An Anciente Mappe of Fairyland, Newly Discovered and Set Forth (1917), which depicts numerous characters from legends and fairytales. This was a large (475 x 1800mm.) map-style print published by Sidgwick & Jackson.

He was a member of the Royal Birmingham Society of Artists between 1923 and 1928. As a young man, Sleigh was greatly inspired by the work of George MacDonald and William Morris.

== Education and work ==
Born and raised in Kings Norton in the semi-rural south of the industrial city of Birmingham, Sleigh was apprenticed to a wood engraver at the age of 14. He attended the Birmingham School of Art in the city-centre and became a student of Arthur Gaskin (1862–1928), who had worked with Edward Burne-Jones. While at the School, he came under the influence of the Birmingham Group. He joined the Society of Mural Decorators and Painters in Tempera. After sending Henry Payne to Chelsea to study stained-glass technique, the Birmingham School of Art added stained-glass work to their curriculum in 1900. Bernard Sleigh was among the first to enrol for the course.

After his training he became a commercial fine artist. Being especially skilled in wood engraving, he soon caught the public eye through his engravings for books. From 1897 he had been a member of his local Bromsgrove Guild, and under them he received commissions for decorating churches such as Wallasey Memorial Unitarian Church in Cheshire, and designing other stained-glass windows. His advertising after 1918 says he could do wall paintings (i.e. large decorative murals), memorial windows (i.e. stained-glass windows) and inscriptions in metal. At exhibitions of the Royal Birmingham Society of Artists, he offered to create furniture inlays for clients.

Shortly after success with The Anciente Mappe, Sleigh undertook commercial cartography with a large series of black and white picture-maps of his home city of Birmingham. These were produced in pen and ink for the Birmingham Civic Society, appearing during the 1920s and 30s. They were highly attractive and were widely used to promote a new localist vision of what the city, and its many parks and open spaces, might become for its citizens in the near future.

Sleigh also wrote a series of stories about fairies, The Gates of Horn, published in 1927. Although Sleigh aimed the book at an adult audience, his publishers, J. M. Dent, instead marketed the book for children, and it was a commercial failure. Anderson describes the stories in The Gates of Horn as "engaging and well-told". The Gates of Horn was republished as an ebook edition in 2022.

== Marriage and retirement ==
Beatrice, 1899, watercolour

In 1900 he married Stella D. Phillp, producing a son, Brocas Linwood, in 1902 and in 1906 a daughter, Barbara Grace de Riemer, who became a children's writer. The marriage was dissolved in about 1914.

Sleigh retired to Chipping Campden in 1937, like his mentor Arthur Gaskin, moving into Old Forge Cottage in Cider Mill Lane. His imagery by then had turned from romantic medievalism to a world peopled by fairies and elves. He died on 7 December 1954, leaving an estate valued at £2,187, and probate was granted to Miss Ivy Ann Ellis. Ellis had been "his regular collaborator and constant companion right up until the time of death".

== Bibliography ==
- The Sea King's Daughter & other poems, Mark, Amy; G. Napier, Birmingham, 1895, illustrated and printed by Bernard Sleigh
- The Praise of Folie. Moriae Encomium A booke made in Latin by that great clerke Erasmus Roterodame. Englished by Sir Thomas Chaloner, Erasmus, Essex House Press, 1901, limited edition, 250 copies, woodcuts by Bernard Sleigh after William Strang
- English Book Illustration of To-day. Intro. by Alfred W. Pollard, Sketchley, R. E. D.;, Trench, Trubner and Co, Ltd., London, 1903, with various contributors including Bernard Sleigh
- An Anciente Mappe of Fairyland, Newly Discovered and Set Forth, in the Library of Congress. Illustration by Bernard Sleigh, c. 1920
- A Faery Pageant, Sleigh, Bernard, Birmingham, 1924, poem, limited edition, 475 copies, with illustrations by the author
- The Gates of Horn, Ed. Sleigh, Bernard, J. M. Dent & Sons Ltd., London, 1926
- Franz Schubert: A Sequence of Sonnets and a Prose Anthology, GREW, Eva Mary. The British Musicians Office, Birmingham, 1928, with page decorations by Bernard Sleigh
- A Handbook of Elementary Design, Sleigh, Bernard, R.B.S.A., Sir Isaac Pitman & Sons, Ltd, London, 1930
- Carols, Their Origin, Music and Connection with Mystery-Plays. William J Phillips, Routledge, not dated, with wood engravings by Bernard Sleigh
- Wood Engraving since Eighteen-Ninety, Sleigh, Bernard; Sir Isaac Pitman, London, 1932
- Witchcraft, Sleigh, Bernard. Oriole Press, New Jersey, 1934, illustrated by Bernard Sleigh
- The Song of Songs, Renan, Ernest.; City of Birmingham School of Printing, Birmingham, 1937, with decorations by Bernard Sleigh
- Kanga Creek, An Australian Idyll, Ellis, Havelock, Oriole Press, New Jersey, 1938, limited edition, 250 copies, illustrations by Bernard Sleigh and Ivy Anne Ellis
- The Immortal Hour, Fiona McLeod (Sharp William) City of Birmingham School of Printing, 1939, illustrated by Bernard Sleigh

== See also ==
- Jaro Hess
