= Bananafish Magazine =

Bananafish was a magazine begun in 1987 in San Francisco, California, published under the name Seymour Glass, focusing on various aspects of underground culture, particularly musical genres such as noise music. The magazine ceased publication in 2004.

== Style ==
The style of the magazine was a mix of interviews, articles, fiction, and music reviews, often written in Glass's absurdist, stream-of-consciousness writing style, which at times bordered on nonsense. The text was complemented by bizarre artwork and photographs, frequently unrelated to the articles they accompanied. One trademark of the magazine was its use of appropriated text and images from uncredited or unknown sources, taken from found objects picked up by Glass, other contributors, or readers. Another regular feature was the inclusion of a compilation 7" record or CD of music by artists profiled in the corresponding issue. Bananafish is often credited with giving many Americans their first exposure to Japanese noise musicians such as Merzbow and Solmania, as well as domestic noisemakers like Emil Beaulieau. It was not accepting submissions as of 2013, and had no web presence.

== Discography ==
- Shut Up, Little Man!

== See also ==
- "A Perfect Day for Bananafish", the short story the magazine was named after
