= Sibylle Baier =

German folk singer and actress

- Born: 25 February 1946 (age 80)
- Origin: Germany
- Genres: Folk
- Occupations: Actress; singer-songwriter
- Instruments: Vocals; guitar
- Years active: 1970–73, 2008
- Label: Orange Twin Records
- Website: sibyllebaier.com

Sibylle Baier (born 25 February 1946) is a German folk singer and actress, whose musical abilities achieved belated recognition with the 2006 release of the album Colour Green, compiled from songs she had recorded in the early 1970s.

Her music is known for its plainness, emotional sincerity, and reference to mundane life in a folk style that's been compared to the works of Leonard Cohen and Nick Drake.

== Background ==
Having played the guitar and piano as a young girl, she was moved to write her first song, "Remember The Day", after taking a road trip with a friend across the Alps to Genoa, via Strasbourg.

She appeared in Wim Wenders's 1973 film Alice in the Cities, and her music is also featured in Jochen Richter's Hugs and Other Things (1975), Wenders' Palermo Shooting (2008), and Kristoffer Borgli’s The Drama (2026). Baier opted not to pursue an acting or singing career, and eventually moved to the United States, where she concentrated on bringing up a family.

The songs that made up her album Colour Green were home reel-to-reel tape recordings Baier had made in Germany, when she was in her 20's, between 1970 and 1973. Some 30 years later, her son Robby compiled a CD from these recordings to give to family members as presents for her 60th birthday in 2006. He also gave a copy to Dinosaur Jr's J Mascis, who in turn passed it along to the Orange Twin label. Orange Twin released the album in February 2006.

Sibylle Baier is cited as a major influence for contemporary singer songwriters like Joustene Lorenz and Luluc. In April 2008, it was revealed through her official website that Baier was going into a recording studio and had written two new songs. The first of these, "Let Us Know", was released in September 2008 for the film Palermo Shooting.

== Discography ==
=== Studio album ===
List of studio albums, with selected details
Title	Details
Colour Green (Note: Album was recorded between November 1970 to January 1973.)	Released: 7 February 2006; Label: Orange Twin; Formats: LP, CD, digital download, streaming

== Filmography ==
=== Film ===
Year	Title	Role
1974	Alice in the Cities	Woman on Ferry
