= Wormed by Leonard =

Studio album by Thinking Fellers Union Local 282
- Released: August 1988
- Recorded: 1988
- Genres: Noise rock, indie rock, experimental rock
- Length: 56:51 (original) 72:15 (reissue)
- Label: Thwart
- Producers: Greg Freeman, Thinking Fellers Union Local 282

Thinking Fellers Union Local 282 chronology
Wormed by Leonard (1988)	Tangle (1989)

Wormed by Leonard is the debut studio-recorded cassette by the band Thinking Fellers Union Local 282. It was released in 1988 through Thwart Productions. It was reissued on LP and CD in 1995 with six live bonus tracks. The title derives from Roger Worm and Jerry Leonard, two high school classmates of Eickelberg and Davies from West Delaware Senior High School, in Manchester, Iowa.

== Critical reception ==
Professional ratings
Review scores
Source	Rating
AllMusic	2/5 stars
The Encyclopedia of Popular Music	2/5 stars
Spin Alternative Record Guide	6/10

Trouser Press called the album "the band’s most delicate recording, showing an early folky vein." The Spin Alternative Record Guide wrote that the album "contains potentially hazardous levels of low-fi noisemaking and free-association poetry." Reviewing the album's 1995 reissue, SF Weekly wrote that "all of the Thinking Fellers' trademark elements appear in nascent glory, from alternatively tuned string-tornado rave-ups and enigmatic home recordings to quirky pop distillations and jokey goofs."

== Track listing ==
All tracks are written by Thinking Fellers Union Local 282.

Side one
No.	Title	Length
1.	"It's Seven"	1:06
2.	"Hell Rules"	3:07
3.	"Leaky Bag"	3:54
4.	"I Don't Know"	2:23
5.	"Milva Spectre"	2:40
6.	"Nipper"	4:47
7.	"Oregon Trail"	2:11
8.	"Misfits Park"	2:55
9.	"Coming and Going"	1:26
10.	"Mr. Tuna's Big Old Place"	3:41
Total length:		28:10

Side two
No.	Title	Length
1.	"Narlus Spectre"	3:14
2.	"KLTX"	0:43
3.	"Truck Driving Man"	2:20
4.	"Out in the Kitchen"	6:29
5.	"A Serious Matter"	1:21
6.	"Mile Wide"	4:35
7.	"Motorin' Flarey Henderson"	1:49
8.	"Indigestion"	1:34
9.	"Get Off My House"	5:53
10.	"Scraping Skin Off My Shoulder"	0:43
Total length:		28:41 56:51

Reissue
No.	Title	Writer(s)	Length
21.	"Trevor"		2:13
22.	"Superstar"	Bonnie Bramlett, Leon Russell	5:00
23.	"If I Were in a Shoe"		1:55
24.	"Squidder Boy"		2:36
25.	"Fat Christmas"		1:35
26.	"Not in the Popply Dimension"		2:05
Total length:			15:24 72:15

== Personnel ==
Thinking Fellers Union Local 282

- Paul Bergmann – instruments
- Mark Davies – instruments
- Anne Eickelberg – instruments
- Brian Hageman – instruments
- Hugh Swarts – instruments

Production and additional personnel

- Greg Freeman – production, engineering
- Margaret Murray – illustrations
- Thinking Fellers Union Local 282 – production
- David Tholfsen – contrabass clarinet on "Get Off My House"
