= Tangle (album) =

Studio album by Thinking Fellers Union Local 282
- Released: October 1989
- Studios: Lowdown, San Francisco, California
- Genres: Noise rock, indie rock, experimental rock
- Length: 46:04
- Label: Thwart Productions
- Producers: Greg Freeman, Thinking Fellers Union Local 282

Thinking Fellers Union Local 282 chronology
Wormed by Leonard (1988)	Tangle (1989)	Lovelyville (1991)

Professional ratings
Review scores
Source	Rating
AllMusic	3/5 stars

Tangle is the second album by Thinking Fellers Union Local 282, released as an LP in 1989 through the band's own label, Thwart Productions.

== Track listing ==
All tracks are written by Thinking Fellers Union Local 282.

Side one
No.	Title	Length
1.	"Sister Hell"	3:22
2.	"Prelmnlrl"	5:18
3.	"It Wasn't Me"	3:22
4.	"[untitled]"	0:38
5.	"Keeps Repeating"	3:25
6.	"Sports Car"	5:18
7.	"Burning Up"	1:36
Total length:		22:59

Side two
No.	Title	Length
1.	"What Time Is It"	5:29
2.	"Change Your Mind"	5:11
3.	"[untitled]"	1:15
4.	"Cold Cold Cold Ground"	5:22
5.	"Choke"	5:48
Total length:		23:05 46:04

On streaming services, tracks 4 and 10 are titled "Of Toes, Yark" and "Mr. Whitey Tighty" respectively.

== Personnel ==
Thinking Fellers Union Local 282

- Paul Bergmann – drums, accordion, vocals
- Mark Davies – guitar, bass guitar, vocals
- Anne Eickelberg – bass guitar
- Brian Hageman – guitar, tape, vocals
- Hugh Swarts – guitar, vocals

Production and additional personnel

- Kevin Barnard – design
- Gib Curry – photography
- Greg Freeman – production, engineering
- Thinking Fellers Union Local 282 – production
