= Thinking Fellers Union Local 282 =

American experimental indie rock group

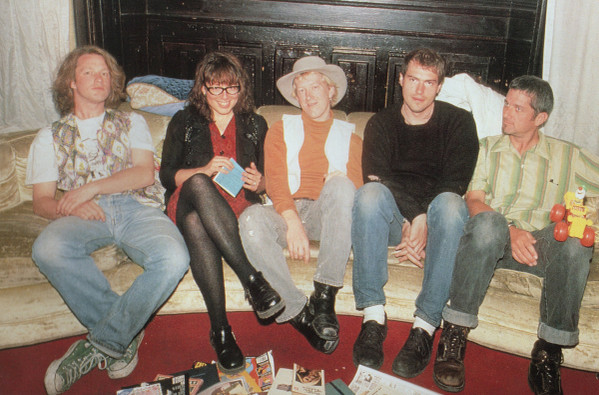

Background information
- Origin: San Francisco, California, United States
- Genres: Experimental rock; noise rock; indie rock; lo-fi
- Years active: 1986–2001; 2004; 2011; 2024; 2026
- Labels: Matador; Communion; Nuf Sed; Ajax; Scratch; Thwart Productions; Amarillo; Japan Overseas; Brinkman; Hemiola; Bulbous Monocle
- Members: Mark Davies; Anne Eickelberg; Brian Hageman; Hugh Swarts; Jay Paget; Paul Bergmann; Gino Robair; Darrell Bourque
- Website: tful282.com

Thinking Fellers Union Local 282 (often shorted to 'Thinking Fellers' or 'TFUL282') were an American indie rock band, which was formed in 1986 in San Francisco, California though half of its members are from Iowa. Their albums combine lo-fi noise rock and ambient sounds (referred to as "Feller filler") with tightly constructed rock and pop songs. There is a small but fiercely devoted cult following for the band.

For the majority of the band's career, Thinking Fellers consisted of multi-instrumentalists Brian Hageman, Mark Davies, Anne Eickelberg, Hugh Swarts, and Jay Paget.

== History ==
The band achieved their greatest critical and commercial success in the mid-1990s, when they signed with the indie rock label Matador Records. It was during this time that Thinking Fellers produced their most prominent albums, Lovelyville, and Strangers from the Universe. They toured the Netherlands, Germany, Switzerland and the UK in 1994 and made an appearance on the John Peel radio show on the BBC. In 1996, they toured briefly as an opening act for the alternative rock band Live, but were not received well by the Live fanbase. Thinking Fellers has been largely dormant since 1996, having toured sporadically and released only one full album, Bob Dinners and Larry Noodles Present Tubby Turdner's Celebrity Avalanche, since.

Elf Power's 1999 album A Dream In Sound featured a cover of Thinking Fellers Union Local 282's song "Noble Experiment."

In 2001, author Jonathan Franzen referenced the band in his novel The Corrections. The character Brian, a snobbish fan of "west coast underground bands," listens to the albums of Thinking Fellers while writing the music software that will make him a young millionaire.

On January 7, 2011, the All Tomorrow's Parties festival announced a Thinking Fellers Union Local 282 performance at the ATP festival weekend May 13–15, 2011 curated by Animal Collective.

In 2017, Beverly Williams's book Survival Kit's Apocalypse quoted the lines "If the sadness of life makes you tired/And the failures of man make you sigh/You can look to the time soon arriving/When this noble experiment winds down and calls it a day" from the Fellers' song "Noble Experiment" from Strangers from the Universe. In 2019, The National also interpolated the full lyrics into their song "Not in Kansas" on the album I Am Easy to Find.

On August 10 and 11, 2024, the band reunited for a couple of reunion shows at Turn! Turn! Turn! in Portland, Oregon. These shows sold out by word of mouth and featured four of the original members: Davies, Hageman, Swarts and Paget.

== Discography ==
=== Studio albums ===
- Wormed by Leonard Thwart Productions 1988 / 1995
- Tangle Thwart Productions 1989 / Scratch Records 1995
- Lovelyville Matador Records 1991 / Bulbous Monocle 2026
- Mother of All Saints Matador Records 1992
- Strangers from the Universe Matador Records 1994 / Bulbous Monocle 2022
- I Hope It Lands Communion 1996
- Bob Dinners and Larry Noodles Present Tubby Turdner's Celebrity Avalanche Communion 2001

=== Singles and EPs ===
- The Natural Finger 7" Ajax Records 1990
- 2×4's / Horrible Hour 7" Nuf Sed 1990
- Outhouse of the Pryeeeeeeee / Wheat Delusion 7" split w/ Sun City Girls Nuf Sed 1991
- Where's Officer Tuba 12" Hemiola Records 1993
- Admonishing the Bishops Matador Records 1993 / Bulbous Monocle 2022
- The Funeral Pudding Ajax Records/Brinkman Records 1994 / Bulbous Monocle 2024
- Everyday / Selections From A Fistful of Dollars 7" Amarillo Records / Runt 1995
- The Kids Are In the Mud / Broken Bones 7" Japan Overseas 1996

=== Compilations and Live albums ===
- TFUL282 Japan Overseas 1995
- Porcelain Entertainments Return to Sender 1995 / Fruit Tree 2000
- These Things Remain Unassigned (Singles, Compilation Tracks, Rarities & Unreleased Recordings) Bulbous Monocle 2023

=== Video ===
- Meet the Thinking Fellers (dir. Gibbs Chapman) Japan Overseas 1993
