= The Fear, the Fear, the Fear =

The Fear, The Fear, The Fear

Studio album by Defiance, Ohio
- Released: December 4, 2007
- Recorded: June – September 2007
- Genre: Folk punk
- Length: 24:33
- Label: No Idea Records
- Producer: Mike Bridavsky

Defiance, Ohio chronology
The Great Depression (2006)	The Fear, The Fear, The Fear (2007)	Midwestern Minutes (2010)

Professional ratings
Review scores
Source	Rating
Alternative Press	3.5/5 stars
Maximum Rocknroll	(mixed)
The New Scheme	(favorable)
PunkNews.org	3.5/5 stars

The Fear, The Fear, The Fear is Defiance, Ohio's third full-length album. The album was originally scheduled to be released on No Idea Records during the Fest in Gainesville, Florida, but was delayed until December 4. As with all of the band's recordings, the album is available free on the band's website. It was recorded at Russian Recordings in Nashville, Indiana.

As the name of the album (which is derived from a line in track five, "Eureka!") and many of the track titles indicate, the major lyrical theme of The Fear, The Fear, The Fear is fear. Other major themes include anxiety, worry, isolation, monotony, and acceptance.

This album marks a shift in sound for Defiance, Ohio, with Ryan Woods taking up an electric bass instead of his usual double bass.

== Track listing ==
No.	Title	Length
1.	"Can't Stop, Won't Stop"	1:47
2.	"The List"	3:25
3.	"The Things We Won't Let Settle But Let Set"	3:22
4.	"The Condition"	1:49
5.	"Eureka!"	1:19
6.	"Now, Now, Now"	2:41
7.	"Anxious and Worrying"	2:09
8.	"The Years, The Fears, The Sleep"	2:04
9.	"Oh, Cheri"	2:37
10.	"Expect The Worst"	3:10
Total length:		24:33

== Personnel ==
Music

- Geoff Hing – guitar, vocals
- Ryan Woods – bass, vocals
- Will Staler – drums, guitar, vocals
- BZ – violin, piano
- Sherri Miller – cello, banjo, vocals
- Theo Hilton – drums, guitar, piano, vocals

Production

- Mike Bridavsky - engineer, mastering, mixing
