= Strangers from the Universe =

Studio album by Thinking Fellers Union Local 282
- Released: September 6, 1994
- Studios: Lowdown, San Francisco, California
- Genres: Indie rock, experimental rock, noise rock
- Length: 46:38
- Label: Matador
- Producers: Greg Freeman, Thinking Fellers Union Local 282

Thinking Fellers Union Local 282 chronology
| The Funeral Pudding (1994) | Strangers from the Universe (1994) | I Hope It Lands (1996) |

Strangers from the Universe is an album by the American band Thinking Fellers Union Local 282, released on September 6, 1994, through Matador Records. The band supported the album by touring with Live. Strangers from the Universe was a moderate commercial success. Mark Davies used an Optigan keyboard on some of the tracks.

It was reissued in 2022.

== Critical reception ==
Professional ratings
Review scores
| Source | Rating |
|---|---|
| AllMusic | 4.5/5 stars |
| The Encyclopedia of Popular Music | 2/5 stars |
| The Great Alternative & Indie Discography | 4/10 |
| Pitchfork | 9.2/10 |
| Spin Alternative Record Guide | 8/10 |
| Sputnikmusic | 4.5/5 |

Trouser Press wrote: "Berserk rhythms are presented with deadpan simplicity, like the sickly funk riff of 'Socket' that keeps sticking a banana peel in its own path." Spin opined that "for once the Thinking Fellers have made an album that you can comfortably hear straight through, and its dark mood deepens along the way."

The Washington Post determined that the album "can be elusive, but much of it deserves the title the band bestowed on the closing track, 'Noble Experiment'." The Santa Fe New Mexican noted that "sometimes stringed instruments, such as banjo or mandolin, are used as rhythm instruments, or to create a throbbing drone ... It's usually unsettling, but sometimes beautiful."

== Track listing ==
All tracks are written by Thinking Fellers Union Local 282.

| No. | Title | Length |
|---|---|---|
| 1. | "My Pal the Tortoise" | 2:47 |
| 2. | "Socket" | 4:23 |
| 3. | "Bomber Pilot WWII" | 1:14 |
| 4. | "Hundreds of Years" | 4:29 |
| 5. | "Guillotine" | 5:13 |
| 6. | "Uranium" | 1:14 |
| 7. | "February" | 3:09 |
| 8. | "Pull My Pants Up Tight" | 0:59 |
| 9. | "Cup of Dreams" | 6:40 |
| 10. | "The Oxenmaster" | 1:49 |
| 11. | "The Operation" | 5:24 |
| 12. | "The Piston and the Shaft" | 5:11 |
| 13. | "Communication" | 0:24 |
| 14. | "Noble Experiment" | 3:11 |

== Personnel ==
Thinking Fellers Union Local 282

- Mark Davies – vocals, guitar, bass guitar, banjo, Optigan, brass instruments, percussion
- Anne Eickelberg – vocals, bass guitar, keyboards, percussion
- Brian Hageman – vocals, guitar, mandolin
- Jay Paget – vocals, drums, guitar, keyboards, sampler
- Hugh Swarts – vocals, guitar, percussion

Production and additional personnel

- Gail Butensky – photography
- Greg Freeman – production, engineering
- John Frentress – sculptures
- Margaret Murray – design
- Thinking Fellers Union Local 282 – production, recording
