= Share What Ya Got =

Studio album by Defiance, Ohio
- Released: 2003
- Recorded: December 2002; March 2003; June 12, 2003
- Genre: Folk punk
- Length: 32:56 (US), 37:25 (UK)
- Label: Self-released, No Idea Records, Friends and Relatives Records
- Producer: Defiance, Ohio

Defiance, Ohio chronology
Share What Ya Got (2003)	The Great Depression (2006)

Professional ratings
Review scores
Source	Rating
Punknews.org	3.5/5 stars

Share What Ya Got is the first full-length album by the folk punk band Defiance, Ohio. It was followed by The Great Depression in 2006.

Tracks 1, 3 and 11 were recorded at Steven's Gonna Die studios in Neenah, Wisconsin' in December 2002. Tracks 7 to 9 were recorded on June 12, 2003, and all other tracks were recorded in March 2003 at Danger Room Studios in Dayton, Ohio.

== Track listing ==
No.	Title	Length
1.	"Hey Kathleen, Are You Hungry?"	1:34
2.	"This Time, This Year"	3:11
3.	"I'm Just Going To Leave"	2:12
4.	"Chad's Favorite Song"	3:12
5.	"I Don't Want Solidarity If It Means Holding Hands With You"	2:28
6.	"Drinking Song"	3:35
7.	"Bikes + Bridges"	2:52
8.	"Sweet Dudes and Sweet Ladies"	2:32
9.	"Lullabies"	3:02
10.	"Old Dead Tree"	3:12
11.	"Road Signs Always Look Better Looking Over Your Shoulder"	2:40
12.	"Response to Griot"	2:26
Total length:		32:56

European release only
No.	Title	Length
13.	"Sometimes Motion"	2:07
14.	"A Song About Promises"	2:22
Total length:		37:25

Tracks 7–9 were not included on the first pressing.

== Personnel ==
Music

- BZ – violin
- Geoff Hing – guitar, vocals
- Ryan Woods – double bass, vocals
- Sherri Miller – cello, vocals
- Will Staler – drums, guitar, vocals

Production

- Pogo – mastering
- Chris Common – engineer (tracks 2, 4–10, 12)
- Joe Crane – engineer (tracks 1, 3, 11)
- Greg Blakemore – engineer (tracks 13, 14)
