= Palermo Shooting =

2008 film

- German DVD cover
- Directed by: Wim Wenders
- Written by: Wim Wenders; Norman Ohler; Bernd Lange
- Produced by: Gian-Piero Ringel; Wim Wenders
- Starring: Campino; Giovanna Mezzogiorno; Dennis Hopper
- Cinematography: Franz Lustig
- Edited by: Peter Przygodda; Oli Weiss
- Music by: Irmin Schmidt
- Production company: Neue Road Movies
- Distributed by: Senator Film
- Release dates: 24 May 2008 (Cannes); 20 November 2008 (Germany)
- Running time: 124 minutes
- Countries: Germany; France; Italy
- Languages: German; English; Italian

Palermo Shooting is a 2008 film written and directed by German director Wim Wenders, and starring Campino, Dennis Hopper, Giovanna Mezzogiorno, Lou Reed in his final feature film appearance, and an uncredited Milla Jovovich, also playing herself. It was screened at the 2008 Cannes Film Festival.

== Plot ==
A German photographer named Finn (Campino) comes to Palermo because he needs to make a clean break from his past. In the city, he meets a young woman named Flavia (Giovanna Mezzogiorno) and a completely different way of life.

== Cast ==
- Campino as Finn
- Inga Busch as Karla
- Axel Sichrovsky as Hans
- Gerhard Gutberlet as Gerhard
- Harry Blain as Harry
- Sebastian Blomberg as Julian
- Jana Pallaske as Student
- Olivia Asiedu-Poku as Fan
- Melika Foroutan as Anke
- Anna Orso as Mother
- Lou Reed as Himself
- Udo Samel as Banker
- Giuseppe Provinzano as Actor 1
- Giuseppe Massa as Actor 2
- Giovanna Mezzogiorno as Flavia
- Patrizia Schiavone as Market Woman
- Letizia Battaglia as Photographer
- Alessandro Dieli as Doctor
- Carmelo Billitteri as Doorman
- Dennis Hopper as Frank
- Milla Jovovich as Herself
- Anton Giulio Pandolfo as Contained

== Production ==
This is the first film directed by Wenders in his hometown, Düsseldorf. Filming also took place in the nearby cities of Essen and Neuss as well as in Palermo and other areas of Sicily.

=== Soundtrack ===
The film's original soundtrack includes songs from Beirut, Jason Collett, Portishead, Calexico, and Iron & Wine. It also features exclusive tracks from Grinderman, Bonnie Prince Billy, Matt Sweeney, and Sibylle Baier.

No.	Title	Artist(s)	Length
1.	"Dream (Song for Finn)"	Grinderman	4:06
2.	"Busy Hope"	Get Well Soon	3:11
3.	"The Rip"	Portishead	4:29
4.	"Bei Flavia I"	Irmin Schmidt	1:32
5.	"Freedom Hangs Like Heaven"	Iron & Wine	3:59
6.	"It's a Departure"	The Long Winters	3:04
7.	"The Black Light"	Calexico	3:21
8.	"Some Kinda Love"	The Velvet Underground	3:39
9.	"Beds in the East"	Thom	4:19
10.	"Fresko"	Irmin Schmidt	3:33
11.	"Postcards from Italy"	Beirut	4:16
12.	"Quello Che Non Ho"	Fabrizio De André	5:06
13.	"We All Lose One Another"	Jason Collett	4:20
14.	"Torn and Brayed"	Bonnie Prince Billy & Matt Sweeney	3:19
15.	"My Impropriety"	Monta	3:51
16.	"Let Us Know"	Sibylle Baier	3:02
17.	"Bei Flavia II"	Irmin Schmidt	1:39
18.	"Quannu Moru"	Rosa Balistreri	3:04
19.	"Song for Frank"	Grinderman	3:14
20.	"Mysteries"	Beth Gibbons & Rustin' Man	4:38
21.	"Good Friday"	Get Well Soon	4:45

== Release ==
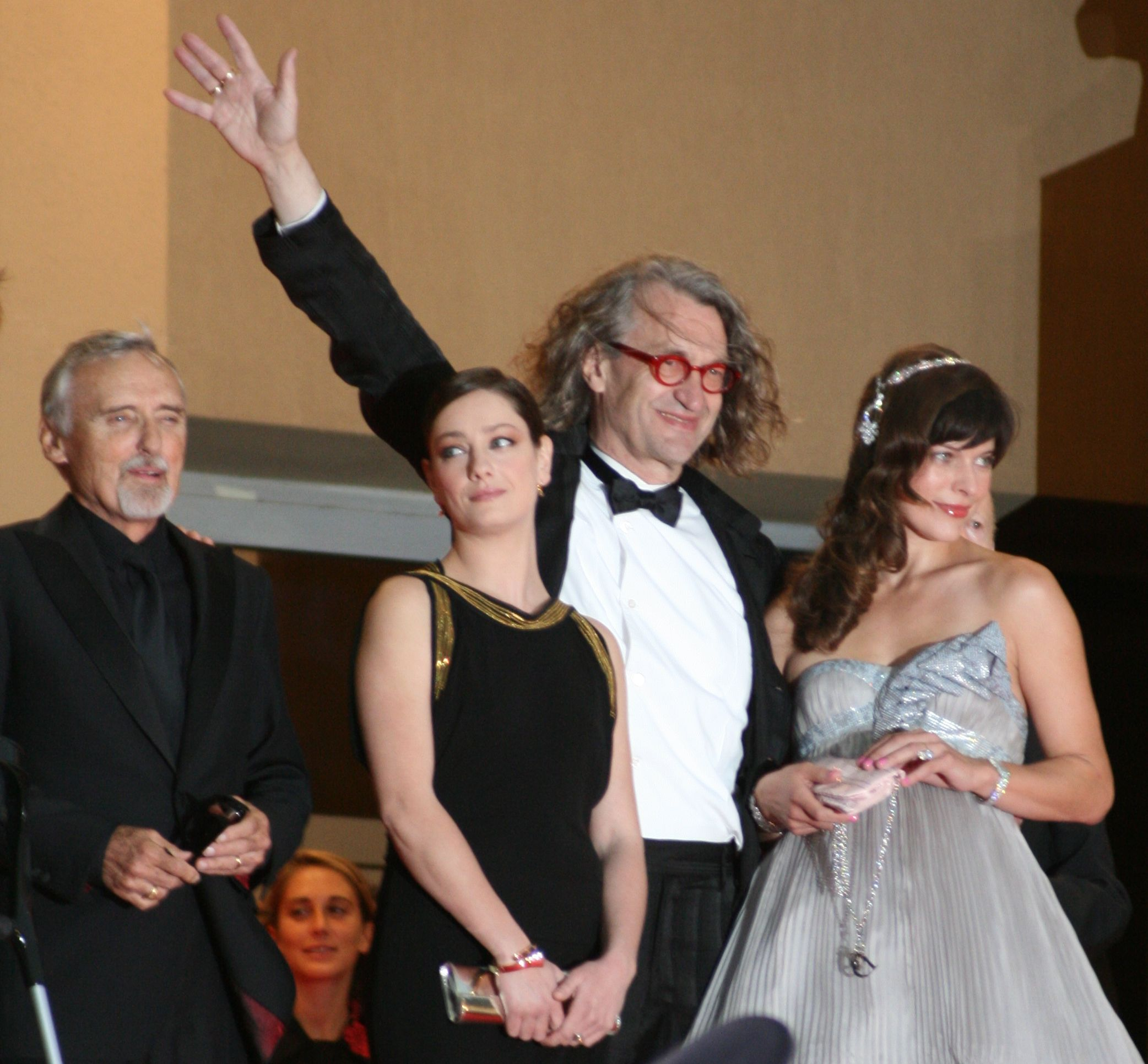
Hopper, Mezzogiorno, Wenders, and Jovovich at the 2008 Cannes Film Festival.

On 24 May 2008, the film was screened at the 2008 Cannes Film Festival.

The film was released in Germany on 20 November 2008. The film had its U.S. premiere on 20 January 2009 at the Berlin and Beyond film festival at the Castro Theatre in San Francisco.

The closing titles contain a dedication to two directors who died on the same day, July 30, 2007, Ingmar Bergman and Michelangelo Antonioni, while filming was ongoing.

== Reception ==
Peter Brunette of The Hollywood Reporter states, "Every time the film goes philosophical on us, the resulting dialogue is sententious and banal." Todd McCarthy of Variety said, "Although she can’t save the film from its own silliness, Mezzogiorno does provide a gravity and legitimacy of her own, as her mesmerizing eyes and her excellent delivery in English make a dramatic highlight out of a monologue about a personal tragedy, as well as showing up Campino for the non-actor he is."

At the 2009 Sofia International Film Festival, the film won the Bourgas Municipality prize.
