= Where's Officer Tuba =

EP by Thinking Fellers Union Local 282
- Released: 1993
- Genre: Indie rock
- Label: Hemiola

Thinking Fellers Union Local 282 chronology
Mother Of All Saints (1992)	Where's Officer Tuba (1993)	Admonishing The Bishops (1993)

Where's Officer Tuba is an EP by the band Thinking Fellers Union Local 282, released in 1993. The EP features three tracks taken from Mother of All Saints and a cover of Caroliner's Outhouse Of The Pryeeeee from the 1991 split single with Sun City Girls, plus four previously unreleased tracks.

== Track listing ==
Side One
No.	Title	Length
1.	"Wide Forehead"	4:04
2.	"A Gentleman's Lament"	2:45
3.	"Outhouse Of The Pryeeeee"	5:04
4.	"I Am Beautiful, I Am Good"	1:46
Total length:		13:39

Side Two
No.	Title	Length
1.	"Hive"	4:37
2.	"Heaven For Real Idiots"	1:20
3.	"Strolling Big Butter"	1:50
4.	"282 Years"	2:48
Total length:		10:35 24:14
