= The Great Depression (Defiance, Ohio album) =

Studio album by Defiance, Ohio
- Released: April 13, 2006
- Recorded: June–December 2005
- Genre: Folk punk
- Length: 29:47
- Label: No Idea Records
- Producer: Jacob Belser

Defiance, Ohio chronology
Share What Ya Got (2004)	The Great Depression (2006)	The Fear, the Fear, the Fear (2007)

Professional ratings
Review scores
Source	Rating
Punknews.org	link
Semtex Magazine	link

The Great Depression is an album by the folk punk band Defiance, Ohio. Despite being produced and distributed for profit by No Idea Records, the album is available under a creative commons license (CC BY-NC-SA). The cigarette smoking man on the cover is Steven Stothard.

== Track listing ==
No.	Title	Length
1.	"Petty Problems"	2:10
2.	"Enough"	3:05
3.	"Oh, Susquehanna!"	3:36
4.	"The New World Order"	1:39
5.	"Calling Old Friends"	2:09
6.	"Trip and Stumble"	2:32
7.	"This Feels Better"	1:19
8.	"This Year"	2:40
9.	"Grandma Song"	2:48
10.	"Letter Home"	1:32
11.	"The Temperature is Dropping"	1:34
12.	"Lambs at the Slaughter"	1:36
13.	"Condition 11:11"	3:07
Total length:		29:47

== Personnel ==
Music

- BZ - drums, violin
- Geoff Hing - guitar, vocals
- Ryan Woods - bass, vocals
- Sherri Miller - banjo, cello, guitar, vocals
- Theo Hilton - drums, guitar, vocals
- Will Staler - drums, guitar, harmonica, vocals

Production

- Jacob Belser - engineer, production, mastering, mixing
