= The Winter Is Coming =

Studio album by Elf Power
- Released: October 17, 2000
- Genre: Indie pop, indie rock
- Label: Sugar Free Records

Elf Power chronology
A Dream in Sound (1999)	The Winter Is Coming (2000)	Creatures (2002)

Professional ratings
Review scores
Source	Rating
AllMusic	3/5 stars
The Encyclopedia of Popular Music	3/5 stars
Pitchfork	6.9/10
Spin	7/10

The Winter Is Coming is an album by the indie rock band Elf Power, released in 2000.

== Critical reception ==
The A.V. Club wrote that "psychedelic pop doesn't come much better than the title track, 'The Naughty Villain', or the album-opening 'Embrace The Crimson Tide', but elsewhere Elf Power seems content upping the trippiness factor of its previous work." Trouser Press thought that "odd touches in the arrangements sound more organic, and the increased density gives songs like the droning, apocalyptic 'Embrace the Crimson Tide' an intriguing quality of foreboding." The Chicago Tribune opined: "No amount of shambling studio modesty can mask the band's seemingly effortless grasp of exuberant songcraft and shining chamber-pop."

== Track listing ==
1. "Embrace the Crimson Tide"
2. "Skeleton"
3. "The Great Society"
4. "The Winter Is Coming"
5. "Wings of Light"
6. "The Sun Is Forever"
7. "People Underneath"
8. "Green Sea Days"
9. "The Naughty Villain"
10. "Leopard's Teeth"
11. "Birds in the Backyard"
12. "100,000 Telescopes"
13. "The Albatross
