= Vainly Clutching at Phantom Limbs =

Studio album by Elf Power
- Released: 1995
- Genre: Indie pop, indie rock, experimental rock
- Label: Arena Rock

Elf Power chronology
Vainly Clutching at Phantom Limbs (1995)	The Winter Hawk EP (1996)

Professional ratings
Review scores
Source	Rating
AllMusic	2/5 stars
PopMatters	
Tiny Mix Tapes	
Under the Radar	7.5/10

Vainly Clutching at Phantom Limbs is the first full-length release by indie rock band Elf Power. Self-released in 1995, it received reissues on Drug Racer in 1996, and on Arena Rock Recording Company in 2000.

== Track listing ==
No.	Title	Length
1.	"Pioneer Mansion"	2:27
2.	"Temporary Arm"	2:20
3.	"All You Experiments"	2:56
4.	"Finally Free"	3:25
5.	"Drug Store"	1:40
6.	"Loverboy's Demise"	2:27
7.	"Slither Hither"	3:32
8.	"Circular Malevolence"	3:58
9.	"When The Serpents Approach"	2:28
10.	"Surgery"	2:10
11.	"Vainly Clutching at Phantom Limbs"	3:17
12.	"Arachnid Dungeon Attack"	3:50
13.	"Grand Intrusion Call"	3:21
14.	"Monster Surprise"	3:20
15.	"Heroes and Insects"	2:44
16.	"The Winter Hawk"	1:58
17.	"Exalted Exit Wound"	2:19

== Personnel ==
- Andrew Rieger - guitar, vocals, flute, organ, bass, drums
- Eric Ledford - cello (1)
- Raleigh Hatfield - guitar (1)
- Laura Carter - drums (2)
- Dave Rathgeber - vocals (10)
