= Mother of All Saints =

Studio album by Thinking Fellers Union Local 282
- Released: 1992
- Studios: Lowdown, San Francisco, California
- Genres: Noise rock, indie rock, experimental rock
- Length: 69:38
- Label: Matador
- Producers: Greg Freeman, Thinking Fellers Union Local 282

Thinking Fellers Union Local 282 chronology
Lovelyville (1991)	Mother of All Saints (1992)	Where's Officer Tuba (1993)

Mother of All Saints is an album by the American band Thinking Fellers Union Local 282. It was released in 1992 through Matador Records. The band supported the album by playing shows with Bailter Space.

== Critical reception ==
Professional ratings
Review scores
Source	Rating
AllMusic	3/5 stars
Chicago Tribune	3.5/4 stars
The Encyclopedia of Popular Music	3/5 stars
The Great Alternative & Indie Discography	6/10
Spin Alternative Record Guide	8/10

The Chicago Tribune deemed the album "a sprawling, 23-song, 70-minute heap of fragmented melodies, noise and roundabout backwoods ruralism." The Gainesville Sun praised the "staggering epic weirdness."

== Track listing ==
All tracks are written by Thinking Fellers Union Local 282.

No.	Title	Length
1.	"..."	0:08
2.	"Gentleman's Lament"	2:47
3.	"Catcher"	2:27
4.	"Hornet's Heart"	2:41
5.	"Star Trek"	3:59
6.	"Tell Me"	4:07
7.	"Heaven for Addled Imbeciles"	1:22
8.	"Hive"	4:41
9.	"Hummingbird in a Cube of Ice"	4:04
10.	"None Too Fancy"	2:47
11.	"Wide Forehead"	4:09
12.	"Infection"	5:18
13.	"Pleasure Circle"	1:26
14.	"Tight Little Thing"	1:43
15.	"Hosanna Loud Hosanna"	1:17
16.	"Tuning Notes"	4:08
17.	"Shuddering Big Butter"	2:52
18.	"1" Tall"	4:29
19.	"Raymond H."	5:52
20.	"..."	0:49
21.	"Cistern"	4:37
22.	"El Cerrito"	2:48
23.	"Fish Bowl"	1:07
Total length:		69:38

On streaming services, tracks 1 and 20 are titled "The Herald" and "The Toad Submerged" respectively.

== Personnel ==
Thinking Fellers Union Local 282

- Mark Davies – guitar, bass guitar, banjo, percussion, French horn, organ, vocals
- Anne Eickelberg – bass guitar, percussion, vocals
- Brian Hageman – guitar, erhu, viola, mandolin, tape, percussion, vocals
- Jay Paget – drums, vocals
- Hugh Swarts – guitar, piano, percussion, vocals

Production and additional personnel

- Paul Bergmann – drums on "Tight Little Thing"
- Gail Butensky – photography
- Kim Campisano – photography
- John Frentress – harmonica on "1" Tall"
- Greg Freeman – production, engineering
- Bren't Lewiis – tape on "Tell Me"
- Thinking Fellers Union Local 282 – production
