= Elf Power =

American indie rock band

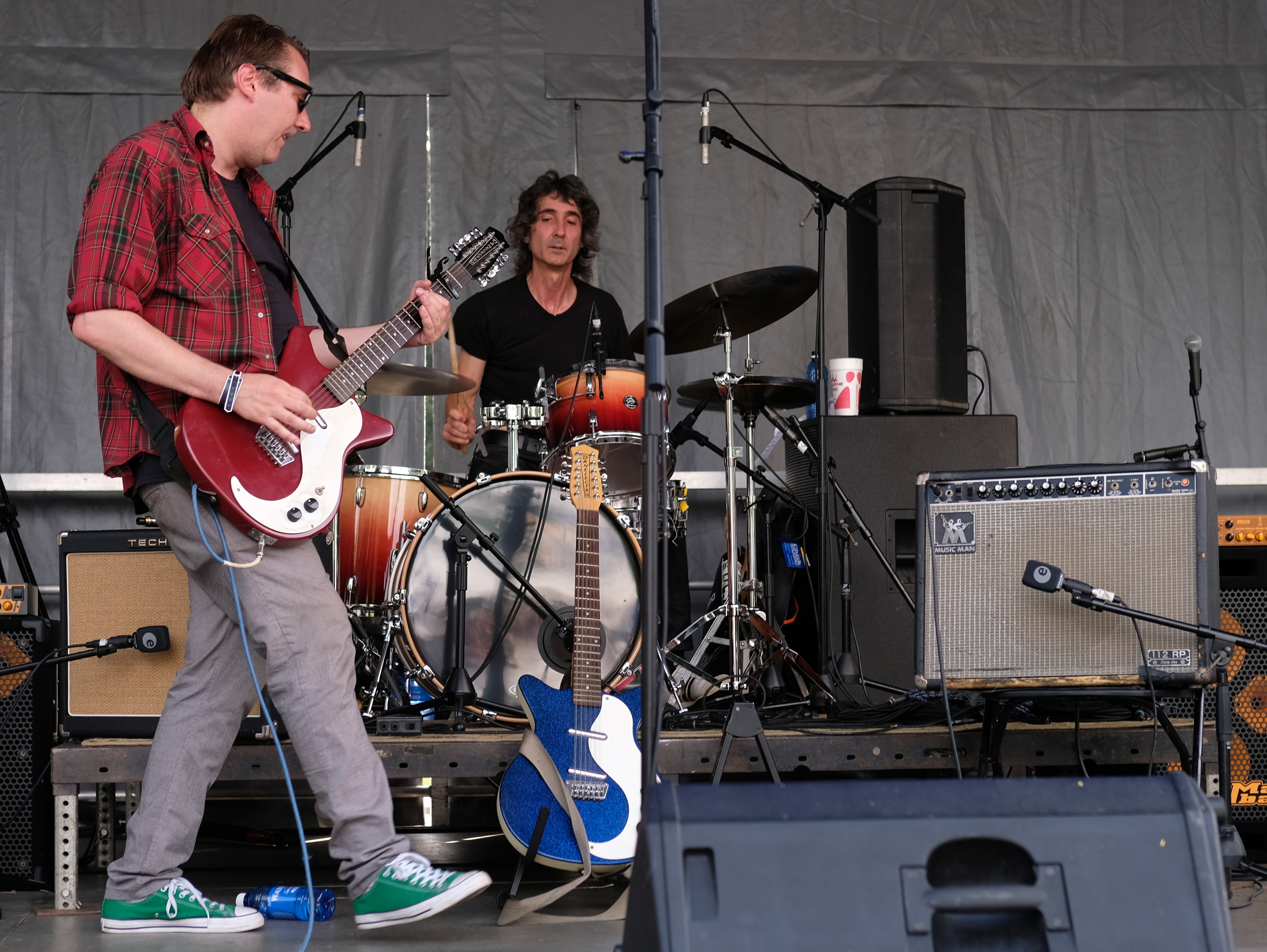
- Elf Power performing live at Athfest 2018

Background information
- Origin: Athens, Georgia, United States
- Genres: Indie rock; neo-psychedelia; psychedelic pop
- Years active: 1994–present
- Labels: Orange Twin; Rykodisc; Arena Rock; Elephant Six; spinArt; Low Transit Industries; Yep Roc
- Members: Andrew Rieger; Laura Carter; Bryan Poole; Dave Wrathgabar; Peter Alvanos
- Past members: Derek Almstead; John Fernandes; Adrian Finch; Matthew Garrison; Raleigh Hatfield; Eric Harris; James Huggins; Jimmy Hughes; Ballard Lesemann; Aaron Wegelin
- Website: elfpower.com

Elf Power is an American indie rock band that originated in Athens, Georgia, United States. The line-up consists of guitarist/vocalist Andrew Rieger, keyboardist Laura Carter, guitarist Dave Wrathgabar, bassist Bryan Poole, and drummer Peter Alvanos. They are part of the Elephant Six Collective.

== History ==
The band began as a four-track recording project of Rieger, Carter, Raleigh Hatfield and Dave Wrathgabar, later of Fablefactory. These recording sessions eventually resulted in the first incarnation of their debut album Vainly Clutching at Phantom Limbs. The band's line-up expanded when Rieger and Carter recruited Elephant Six musician Bryan Poole, also known as The Late B.P. Helium. While the band occasionally played live shows and continued to record, Poole chiefly stayed in Athens to continue work with Of Montreal while Rieger and Carter moved to New York City.

=== Mid–late 1990s ===
After residing in New York for some time, the band released The Winter Hawk EP in 1996. Eventually, Rieger and Carter were convinced to move back to Athens, where the band's second album When the Red King Comes was ultimately recorded and released as a joint venture between the Arena Rock Recording Co. and the Elephant Six label. The album featured contributions by members of The Olivia Tremor Control, Kevin Barnes of Of Montreal, and Jeff Mangum of Neutral Milk Hotel.

Shortly following the release of When the Red King Comes, Elf Power collaborated with Dave Fridmann, best known for his work with The Flaming Lips, to record the album A Dream in Sound. The album was again recorded with the help of Mangum and Barnes, as well as Scott Spillane of Neutral Milk Hotel and The Gerbils.

During the 1999 supporting tour for A Dream in Sound, Adrian Finch joined the band to play violin. Following the addition, the band recorded an EP focused chiefly on cover material entitled Come On. Around this time, Vainly Clutching at Phantom Limbs was reissued with material from early sessions.

=== Early–mid-2000s ===
The band regrouped in late 2000 to record The Winter Is Coming, again with help from members of other Elephant Six bands. Notably, the band spent this time as a supporting act for fellow Athens band R.E.M., as well as Wilco. Bryan Poole would exit the band for good following the European tour for the album to focus on solo work.

2002 saw the release of two albums from the band: Creatures, an effort released by spinART, and Nothing's Going to Happen, an album released on Orange Twin Records that contained various cover songs and the Come On EP. During this time, Finch left the lineup and Ballard Lesemann stepped in to play bass.

In 2004, Elf Power released their seventh studio album Walking with the Beggar Boys. The album was released to notable media and critical praise and featured contributions from Vic Chesnutt.

The band released Back to the Web on Rykodisc in April 2006, an album which featured bassist Derek Almstead. A tour of the United States and Europe followed. They were also chosen to play in the United Kingdom 2006 All Tomorrow's Parties music festival curated by The Shins.

=== 2008–present ===
The band's ninth album In a Cave was released in March 2008 on Rykodisc. Their MySpace page first described the project as "a lushly orchestrated mix of eclectic songwriting that is sure to conjure up memories of 1997's When the Red King Comes" and stressed its "more mature approach to arrangements, lyrics, and instrumentation."

Elf Power collaborated with Vic Chesnutt on Dark Developments, released on Orange Twin in 2008. It was supported by U.S. and European tours.

Aaron Wegelin, who drummed on the first five Elf Power albums, died on February 2, 2021.

In 2022, Elf Power released their twelfth album Artificial Countrysides on Yep Roc Records.

== Discography ==
=== Albums ===
- Vainly Clutching at Phantom Limbs — Self-released / Drug Racer / Arena Rock Recording Co. (1995/1996/2000)
- When the Red King Comes — Arena Rock Recording Co. / Elephant 6 (1997)
- A Dream in Sound — Arena Rock Recording Co. / Elephant 6 (1999)
- The Winter Is Coming — Sugar Free Records / Elephant 6 (2000)
- Creatures — spinART (2002)
- Nothing's Going to Happen — Orange Twin (2002)
- Walking with the Beggar Boys — Low Transit Industries / Orange Twin (2004)
- Back to the Web — Rykodisc (2006)
- Treasures from the Trash Heap — Self-released (2006)
- In a Cave — Rykodisc (2008)
- Dark Developments (With Vic Chesnutt and the Amorphous Strums) — Orange Twin (2008)
- Elf Power — Orange Twin (2010)
- Sunlight on the Moon — Orange Twin (2013)
- Twitching in Time — Orange Twin (2017)
- Artificial Countrysides — Yep Roc Records (2022)

=== EPs ===
- The Winter Hawk EP (Cassette/7") — Self-released / Kindercore Records (1996)
- Come On — Little Army (1999)

=== Singles ===
- Kindercore Singles Club: May split single with Great Lakes (7") — Kindercore Records (2000)
- "Jane/Needles in the Camel's Eyes" — Shifty Disco (2000)
- "High Atop the Silver Branches" — Shifty Disco (2001)
- "The Naughty Villain" (7") — Shifty Disco (2002)
- Split single with Velvet Monkeys "Honey" (Spacemen 3 cover) - Chunklet Industries (2018)
- Cara Records Singles Club: "Dim Mazes/A Coin in Mid Air" - Cara Records (2020)
