= Laura Carter (musician) =

- Origin: Athens, Georgia, United States
- Genres: Indie rock
- Occupation: Multi-instrumentalist
- Instruments: Clarinet, keyboard, percussion, drums, violin, guitar, trumpet, Casio Digital Horn

Laura Carter is an American multi-instrumentalist musician from Athens, Georgia. She is able to play the clarinet, keyboard, percussion, violin, guitar, drums, french horn, and Casio Digital Horn.

She is most notably in the indie rock band Elf Power, but has performed with a number of bands within the Elephant Six Collective, such as Nana Grizol, The Gerbils, Neutral Milk Hotel, and Dixie Blood Moustache. She was also a founder of the Orange Twin Conservation Community as well as Orange Twin Records. She also dated Jeff Mangum for several years in the late 1990s until their break up in 2000.
