= Orange Twin Records =

Independent record label

- Country of origin: United States
- Location: Athens, GA
- Official website: http://www.orangetwin.com

Orange Twin Records is an Athens, Georgia-based record label run by Laura Carter of the band Elf Power.

The label started in 1999 originally as a fundraiser for the Orange Twin Conservation Community and has released influential works by Jeff Mangum (Neutral Milk Hotel) and other bands from Athens, Georgia, including Lovers and several Elephant 6 related groups. Orange Twin has also re-released records by obscure folk artists Elyse and Sibylle Baier. The label is still a key sponsor for the Orange Twin Conservation Community, also located in Athens, Georgia.

== See also ==
- List of record labels
