= The Way-Out Record for Children =

Studio album by Bruce Haack
- Released: 1968
- Recorded: 1967
- Genres: Children's music; electronic; psychedelic; outsider music
- Length: 39:08
- Label: Dimension 5

Bruce Haack chronology
Dance, Sing, And Listen Again & Again! (1965)	The Way-Out Record for Children (1968)	The Electronic Record for Children (1969)

The Way-Out Record for Children is the fourth album of children's music by Canadian electronic musician Bruce Haack with his collaborator Esther Nelson. It was recorded in 1967 and released in 1968 by their record label Dimension 5, and was the fourth in a series of children's records they created together with Ted Pandel. The album, like its predecessors in the series, contains a set of songs, stories, dances and other activities for young children to engage with, in order to enrich their learning development, and features an array of disparate musical styles.

Whereas previous albums in the series featured Haack's innovative, homemade electronic instruments, the music on The Way-Out Record for Children emphasizes this approach greatly, with repetitious, rhythmic electronic backdrops. Upon its release, the record was commercially unsuccessful but received acclaim from newspaper journalists, and was recommended in several 1970s guides to children's education. After Haack's work received renewed interest in the decades after his 1988 death, the album received acclaim from critics who highlighted the album's electronic experimentation, unlikely psychedelic musical style and status as outsider music. The album has been re-released on several occasions.

== Background ==
After dropping out of the Juilliard School in 1955–56, Canadian outsider electronic musician Bruce Haack began a career writing classical, pop and musique concrete compositions, but this was a financially unsuccessful decision. He soon began working with dance instructor Esther Nelson as her accompanist, which led to the creation of the record label Dimension 5, founded by Haack, Nelson and Ted Pandel, Haacks' fellow former student at Juilliard and lifelong collaborator. Allegedly inspired by Haack's lonely childhood, he and Nelson had begun creating educational music for children, and this led to Dimension 5 launching a series of children's records in 1962, beginning with Dance, Sing & Listen, which was followed-up by two other records in 1963 and 1965. For these releases, Haack, despite lacking training in electronic music, began creating primitive electronic instruments with found objects such as "disembowelled radios." Such instruments included the Sono Vocal Chorus Electronique, the Horn Fuse Plateau and the Electric Wind Tunnel.

The albums were recorded at Pandel and Haack's apartment, and were characterised by mixing activity and story songs (not unlike other children's albums of the era) with an eclectic array of musical styles, such as medieval music, country, classical and pop, with instruments such as banjo, piano and synthesisers. Haack's homemade electronic instruments, which used modular synthesis, were capable of random composition and 12-voice polyphony, and were recorded using a pair of two-track reel-to-reel tapes, with tape echo added to the music for a moody vibe. The albums, with their naive, homedrawn cover artwork, were commercially unsuccessful, but – according to Nelson – engaged children due to Haack's "lack of self-consciousness," which was apparent in the music's "magpie-like imagination, jumping from one glittering fascination to another, combining instruments sounds and styles" according to author Mark Brend. The fourth instalment in Dimension 5's children's record series, The Way-Out Record for Children was recorded in 1967 by Haack and Nelson (credited as Miss Nelson) with Tony and Harry Spiridakis, Risa and Mara Sokolsky and Praxiteles Pandel, although the album is primarily credited to Haack. It was the first volume in the series for three years.

== Production and composition ==
"This wild and wonderful record offers another 'Way Out' for children from typical recordings. Our first three recordings prove that our simple philosophy of love and reverse-psychedelics works. We do fill the senses with an almost infinite range of concepts, abstracts, words, sounds, advice and a contract with order and form. But we know that kids compute—so we ask them to use our basics and stretch to the sky. They do—because kids are turned on."

— Bruce Haacks in the liner notes.

Although Haack's usage of electronic instrumentation had featured in the series since the first volume, he had turned his attention to creating wholly electronic music for children by the time of The Way-Out Record for Children, which was the first album to exemplify this. Brend writes: "Simple, repetitive and rhythmic, it was like kindergarten Kraftwerk, its innocence and playfulness at odds with to opaque theorizing of the adult rock album he was beginning to make at the same time." According to Heather Phares of AllMusic, the album coincided with the musical climate of the 1960s becoming more receptive to Haack's "kind of whimsical innovation." In this era, Haack won several awards for his music, and his business manager and collaborator Chris Kachulis found mainstream outlets for the musician, including writing music for television advertisements for brands including Kraft Cheese and Parker Brothers. The album led to Haack and Nelson demonstrating how to operate synthesizers on Mister Rogers' Neighborhood in 1968.

The album has been described as psychedelic in style, and edges towards the acid rock-influenced style that Haack and Nelson explored on subsequent releases like The Electric Lucifer (1970). Writer Joseph Morpurgo described the album as "a series of cross-genre digital experiments." Although the record is stylistically different than previous Dance, Sing & Listen releases, it remains similar in that Haack and Nelson provide songs, stories, dances and other activities for children to respond to, in order to encourage learning enrichment. Several games and dances require children to get up and move around, and movement songs on the record include "Medieval Dancing".

The album begins with "Introduction" where the record's creators introduce themselves, similarly to their previous albums. "School for Robots", an "ear-body coordination game," feature Haack's robotic-style vocals, achieved by speaking in monotone and tapping his Adam's apple. The musician's sense of humour is present on the track through puns like "Greetings, fellow robots. I hope oil goes well with you. Here is your robot music. Do not rust until you can dance to it." "Mudra" teaches children about India through recited "tripped out astral poetry" and sitar grooves laid atop synthesiser bleeps. Writer Mike Oxman wrote that the following song "Accent" veers abruptly "from a jaunty Schoolhouse Rock-type pop song to segments instructing children to clap poly-rhythmically over odd 5/4 and 7/4 time signatures. The jarring changes of melody, style and tone seemed directly inspired by Haack's study of modern composition." The instrumental "Rubberbands" features electronic experimentation, with its bouncy synthesiser melody and "elastic bowing" of a Jew's harp.

== Release and reception ==
Although recorded in 1967, Dimension 5 did not release The Way-Out Record for Children until 1968. Haack's manager Chris Kachulis, who contributes vocals to the record, designed its artwork. Author Nick DiFonzo included the album sleeve in his 2004 book of the worst album covers of all time. Author Richard Metzger interpreted the album title as a reference to Perrey and Kingsley's 1966 album The In Sound from Way Out!. The album sleeve quoted several of its pre-release reviews; The New Yorker praised the record for engaging children, while Eveleyn LeMone of Dance Magazine said the album was "fun to work to and just to sit and listen to–for anyone." She said it was "small wonder" that the series "have the recommendation of N.Y.C.'s Board of Education and numerous professionals." Meanwhile, George A. Woods of The New York Times said the album was "[i]ncredibly varied and gives off sounds that UFOs would make - if there were such things. And if there are they can drop in anytime as long as Bruce and Miss Nelson are aboard."

A writer for American Record Guide wrote that his three children, aged between 5-10, enjoyed the album, especially "Motorcycle Ride". He felt that the album showed that Haack and Nelson "are even more imaginative" than contemporaries like the Babysitters, citing the album's large usage of "electronic sound to excellent effect," in addition to its wide array of instruments. Although they felt the album, priced at $5, was unusually expensive for a "bargain-priced kiddy disc," they nonetheless conceded the record was "likely to be requested ten times more often than the collections of teddy-bear songs and sloppily dramatized stories which make up the great bulk of children's records." The review concluded that the album appeals "to the creative energies and they elicit active responses," and the vinyl is "likely to wear out long before your children's interest in hearing them."

In her 1974 manual School Before Six: A Diagnostic Approach Volume 2, Laurel Hodgden recommended the album to parents of young children to encourage their children's "spontaneous movement" and for "listening to in a variety of environments." In her 1975 book on dance in elementary education, Ruth Lovell Murray wrote that, compared to earlier volumes in Dimension 5's children's music series, The Way-Out Record for Children and The Electronic Record for Children both "offer particularly good possibilities for exploration and improvisation." She suggested "School for Robots," "Accents," "Rubber- bands," "The Saucer's Apprentice", "Four Seasons" and "Tools" for tutors. In her 1976 book Talkabout: An Early Childhood Language Development Resource, Volume 2, Judith Pasamanick included the album in a list of "unusually evocative records and books" for parents to use in musical activities with their preschool-age children. She called it "one groovy record" and highlighted "such gems" as ""A Motorcycle Ride," "School for Robots," "Rubberbands," and "The Saucers' Apprentice."

== Legacy ==
Following Haack's death in 1988, his work received renewed interest in the 1990s and 2000s. In a retrospective review of The Way-Out Record for Children for AllMusic, Heather Phares praised Haack's "robotic" vocals in "School for Robots," writing "this low-budget innovation is just another manifestation of his practical but innovative approach." A review for Gullbuy felt the album "does not show any wear for its years. Any modern musician would consider themselves blessed if they could create an LP like this." The reviewer's only criticism was Haack's lowly-mixed vocals, but conceded that "the voice problem is by design." The album was highlighted for its "electronic sound pioneering" in Vivian Vale's 1993 book Incredibly Strange Music: Volume 1. Richard Gehr of Spin said that The Way-Out Record for Children and Mort Garson's The Wozard of Iz were innovative examples of "state-of-the-art electronic music for kids all ages." Mike Oxman of the National Music Centre felt that Haack and Nelson's children's albums were examples of classic electronic outsider music, and further cited "Mundra" and "Accent" from The Way-Out Record for Children as examples of Haack's "boundless creativity" that displayed his "mad genius, infused with the ethos of the 60s."

In 2012, Fact Magazine included the album in a list of recommended "alternative children's music", with writer Joseph Morpurgo writing that the album's "trippy olio of looped vocals, wailing synths and vocodered bedtime stories operates in a zodiac of its own." While crediting with Haack as an electronic pioneer with a discography of treasured "oddities," he felt that "The Way Out Record For Children is probably the strangest of the bunch," and said: "In spirit, it’s very much in keeping with the lunatic surrealism of Ren and Stimpy or SpongeBob SquarePants. More than anything else, though, it shows how liberating the remit of composing for the young can be: Haack rarely sounded this unapologetically unhinged again." In another Fact Magazine list documenting great 1950s and 1960s electronic albums, Morpurgo said that the "frazzled album for nippers combines electronic experimentation and whimsy to great effect." A cassette version of the album entitled The Way-Out Cassette for Children was released by Dimension 5 in 1987. The Way-Out Record for Children was reissued by King Record Co. in 2004, and the record label Mississippi reissued both The Way-Out Record for Children and its follow-up The Electronic Record for Children in 2012.

== Track listing ==
All songs written by Bruce Haack.

=== Side one ===
1. "Introduction" – 0:34
2. "Motorcycle Ride" – 3:11
3. "Medieval Dancing" – 3:04
4. "School for Robots" – 2:21
5. "Mudra" – 6:12
6. "Accents" – 2:41
7. "Rubberbands" – 2:16

=== Side two ===
8. "The Saucer's Apprentice" – 6:24
9. "Encore"– 2:18
10. "Four Seasons" – 5:21
11. "Tools" – 3:51
12. "Nothing to Do" – 1:13

== Personnel ==
- Bruce Haack – writing, vocals, performer
- Miss Nelson – performer
- Harry Spiridakis – performer
- Mara Sokolsky – performer
- Praxitéles Pandel – performer
- Risa Sokolsky – performer
- Tony Spiridakis – performer
