= Polar (album) =

Studio album by The High Water Marks
- Released: September 2007
- Genres: Indie pop, indie rock
- Length: 40:48
- Label: Happy Happy Birthday To Me (HHBTM090)
- Producer: The High Water Marks

The High Water Marks chronology
Songs About the Ocean (2004)	Polar (2007)

Professional ratings
Review scores
Source	Rating
PopMatters	(7/10)

Polar is the second album by The High Water Marks. It was released in 2007 on Happy Happy Birthday To Me Records.

== Track listing ==
All tracks were written by Hilarie Sidney and Per Ole Bratset except for "Poison Remedy" and "Etter Sirkel", both written by Jim Lindsay.

1. "Polar" – 5:09
2. "The Leaves" – 4:08
3. "Early Fall" – 3:45
4. "Song For Emigrants" – 4:13
5. "Simple" – 2:44
6. "Galaxy Galaxy Galaxy" – 3:12
7. "Finding Clovers" – 2:23
8. "Dutch Tape" – 4:20
9. "Roadside Revival" – 3:43
10. "Poison Remedy" – 1:50
11. "For Sirkel" – 0:43
12. "Sirkel" – 3:13
13. "Etter Sirkel" – 1:27

== Personnel ==
=== The High Water Marks ===
- Jim Lindsay - drums, percussion, vocals, keyboards, piano
- Hilarie Sidney - guitar, vocals, keyboards, drums, xylophone
- Per Ole Bratset - guitars, vocals
- Mike Snowden - bass guitar

=== Production ===
Polar was recorded and mixed by Hilarie Sidney, produced by The High Water Marks, and mastered by Jason Nesmith. Artwork for the album is by Per Ole Bratset. Album layout by Eric Hernandez.
