= Pop Has Freed Us =

2003 compilation album by Papas Fritas

Compilation album by Papas Fritas
- Released: August 19, 2003
- Genres: Indie rock, pop music
- Length: 55:57
- Label: Minty Fresh
- Producers: Papas Fritas (individual tracks), Anthony Musiala (compilation)

Papas Fritas chronology
Buildings and Grounds (2000)	Pop Has Freed Us (2003)

Professional ratings
Review scores
Source	Rating
Allmusic	4/5 stars

Pop Has Freed Us, a compilation/career retrospective by Papas Fritas, contains eight songs from their studio albums and nine rarities, and comes with a DVD featuring three music videos ("Afterall," "Hey Hey You Say," and "Way You Walk"). It was released in the summer of 2003 on Minty Fresh after "Way You Walk," a track from the band's third LP, Buildings and Grounds, garnered mainstream exposure in a TV commercial for Dentyne Ice.

== Track listing ==
1. "Way You Walk" (Tony Goddess) – 3:48
2. "Smash This World" (Goddess) – 4:08
3. "Lame to Be" (Goddess, Shivika Asthana) – 3:24
4. "Flash Lightning" (Tom Verlaine) – 3:00
5. "High School, Maybe" (Goddess) – 1:31
6. "Passion Play" (Goddess) – 3:04
7. "TV Movies" (Asthana, Goddess) – 3:57
8. "Holiday" (Goddess) – 2:48
9. "Hey Hey You Say" (Asthana, Goddess, Keith Gendel) – 3:15
10. "Let's Go Down to the Town Oasis" (Goddess) – 3:06
11. "Do the Move" (Goddess) – 3:32
12. "Say Goodbye" (Asthana, Goddess) – 4:05
13. "Book of Love" (Lindsey Buckingham, Richard Dashut) – 3:17
14. "Vertical Lives" (Gendel) – 3:46
15. "People Tell Me Not to Worry" (Goddess) – 3:39
16. "Questions" (Goddess) – 3:18
17. "Love Just Don't Quit" (Goddess) – 2:19

1, 14, 16: from Buildings and Grounds; 2: from the Friday Night 7" single, 1994; 3: from the Passion Play 7" single, 1995; 4: previously unreleased (c. 1994); 5: bonus track from international releases of Papas Fritas; 6-8: from Papas Fritas; 9, 12: from Helioself; 10: from the Vertical Lives CD single (2000, Belgium) and Tape Op: A Compact Disc of Creative Music Recordings (2000, US); 11: from the Far From an Answer CD single (2000, Australia); 13: A-side of Kindercore Records Single of the Month, October 2000 (7"); 15: from The Men From O.R.G.A.N. (2002, Italy; originally titled "Solodisco" and credited to Tony Goddess); 17: from In Our Lifetime, Vol. 3: The Revenge of Boston (2002, US) and POPvolume#3 (2002, France)

== Personnel ==
- Shivika Asthana: drums, vocals
- Keith Gendel: bass, vocals
- Tony Goddess: guitar, piano, vocals
- Derek Brain: trumpet on "Let's Go Down to the Town Oasis"
- Bryan Hanna: toms and maracas on "Hey Hey You Say"
- Tom Swafford: string arrangement on "Passion Play" (Swafford and Kathleen Derbyshire, violins; Heather Morehouse, viola; Sarah Thompson, cello)
- Samantha Wood: background vocals on "Let's Go Down to the Town Oasis" and "Do the Move"

== Production notes ==
"Hey Hey You Say" and "Say Goodbye" coproduced by Bryan Hanna. Liner notes by Tony Goddess and Jay Ruttenberg. Photography by Keith Gendel and Courtney Banfield. Layout by Shannon Showers.
