= Far Away Places (disambiguation) =

Far Away Places or Faraway Places may refer to:

- Far Away Places, an American popular song
- Far Away Places (album), an album by 2nd Chapter of Acts
- Far Away Places (Mad Men), an episode of the TV series Mad Men
- Faraway Places, an American indie rock band
