= Cigar box guitar =

Musical instrument

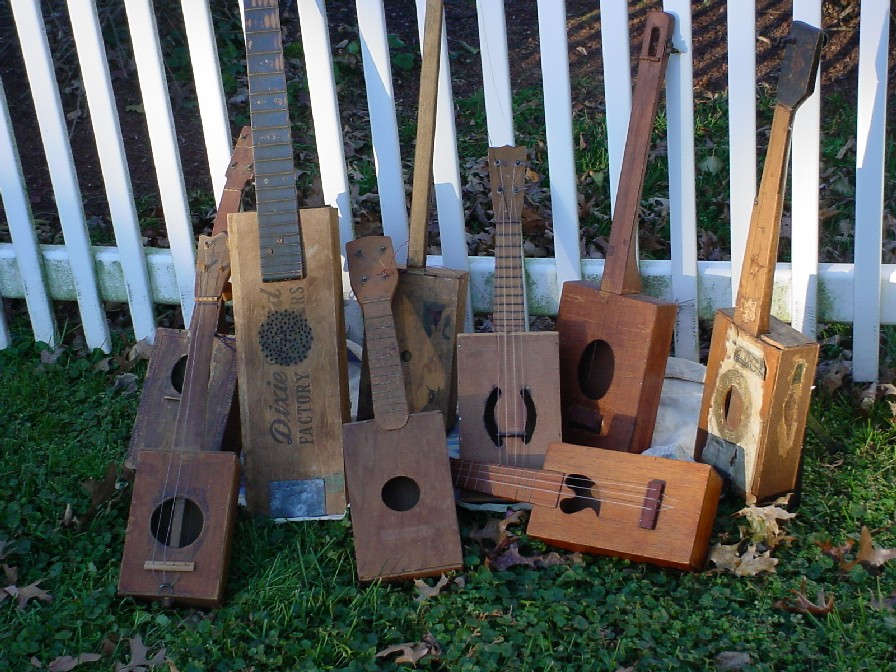
A collection of cigar box guitars

The cigar box guitar is a simple chordophone that uses an empty cigar box as a resonator. The earliest had one or two strings; modern models typically have three or more. Generally, the strings are connected to the end of a broomstick or a 1×2 inch wood slat and to the cigar box resonator.

== History ==
Cigars were packed in boxes, crates, and barrels as early as 1800, but the small boxes that are common today did not exist prior to around 1840. Until then, cigars were shipped in crates containing 100 or more per case. After 1840, cigar manufacturers started using smaller, more portable boxes with 20–50 cigars per box.

Trace evidence of cigar box instruments exists from 1840 to the 1860s. The earliest known illustration of a cigar box instrument is an etching copyrighted in 1876 of two American Civil War soldiers at a campsite, one of whom is playing a cigar box fiddle. The etching was created by illustrator and artist Edwin Forbes, who, under the banner of Frank Leslie's Illustrated Newspaper, worked for the Union Army. The etching was included in Forbes's work Life Studies of the Great Army. In the etching (Home, Sweet Home), the fiddle clearly shows the brand "Figaro" on the cigar box.

In addition to the etching, plans for a cigar box banjo were published by Daniel Carter Beard, co-founder of the Boy Scouts of America, in 1884 as part of Christmas Eve with Uncle Enos. The plans, retitled "How to Build an Uncle Enos Banjo", were included in the 1890 edition of Beard's American Boy's Handy Book as supplementary material at the back of the book. These plans omitted the story but still showed a step-by-step description of a playable five-string fretless banjo made from a cigar box.

It would seem that the earliest cigar box instruments would be crude and primitive, but this is not always the case. According to William Jehle, curator of The Cigar Box Guitar Museum and the author of One Man's Trash: A History of the Cigar Box Guitar, the museum acquired two cigar box fiddles built in 1886 and 1889 that seem very playable and well built. The 1886 fiddle was made for an 8-year-old boy and is certainly playable, but the 1889 fiddle has a well-carved neck and slotted violin headstock. The latter instrument was made for serious playing.

Cigar box guitars and fiddles were also important in the rise of jug bands and blues. As most of these performers were black Americans living in poverty, many could not afford a "real" instrument. Using these, along with the washtub bass (similar to the cigar box guitar), jug, washboard, and harmonica, black musicians performed blues at social events.

The Great Depression of the 1930s saw a resurgence of homemade musical instruments.

== Modern revival ==
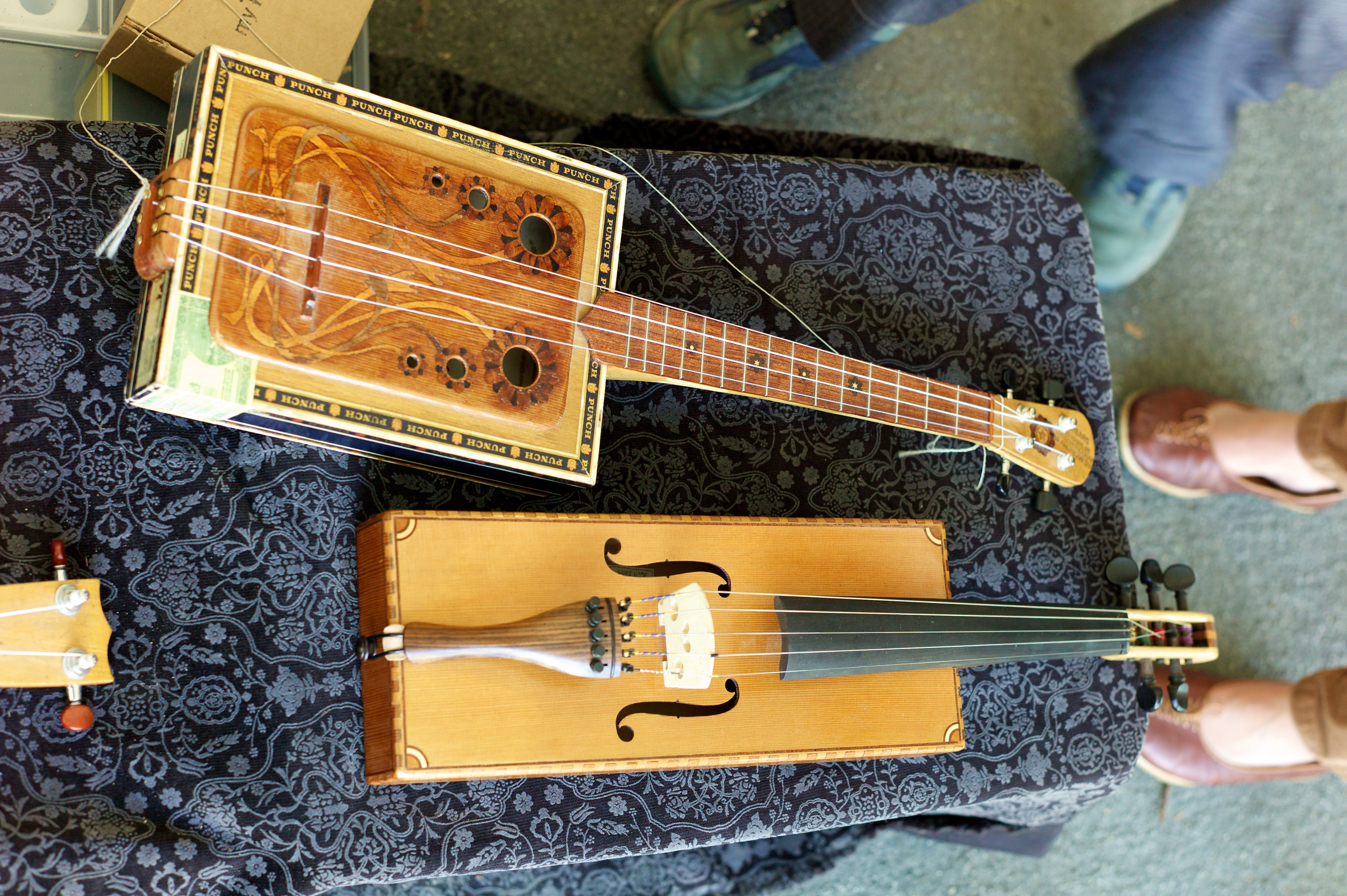
Cigar box guitars at Maker Faire 2011

A modern revival of these instruments has been gathering momentum with an increase in the number of cigar box guitar builders and performers. A loose-knit group of underground musicians tour the East Coast of the United States each summer under the banner "Masters of the Cigar Box Guitar Tour".. These musicians include Doctor Oakroot, Johnny Lowebow, Tomi-O and many others. A growing number of primitive luthiers are adding cigar box guitars to their items for sale. Some cigar box guitar builders of today include Mike Doyle Shane Speal, Mike Snowden, Del Puckett and Peter Lake of Heavy Fog Guitars.

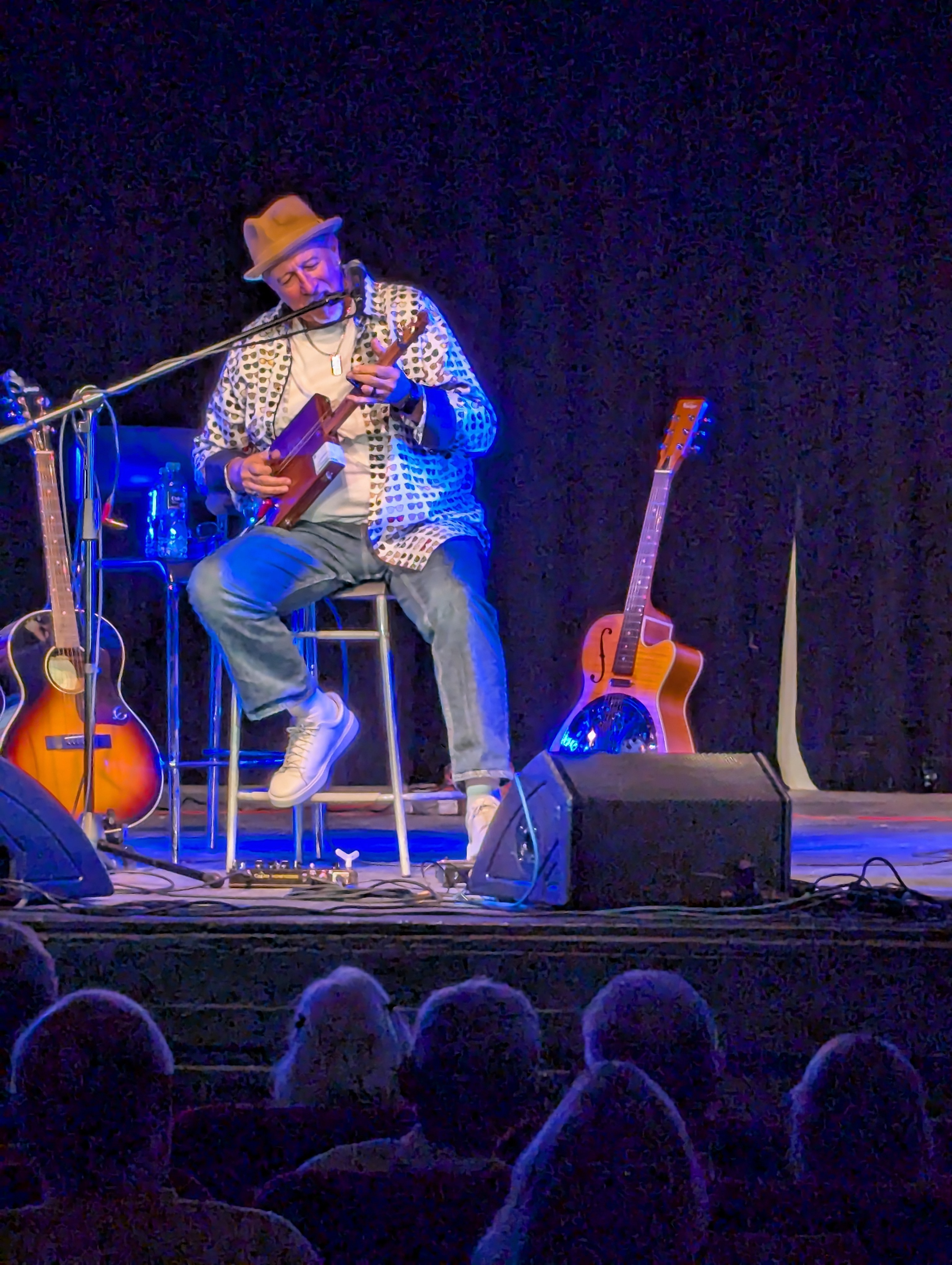
Stacey Mitchhart, a cigar box guitar Luthier, playing at the Bromley Blues club

The modern revival is partly due to interest in the DIY culture, as a cigar box is inexpensive in comparison with other factors, such as strings and construction time. Many modern cigar box guitar makers can be seen as practitioners of a type of lutherie and implement various personal touches, such as the addition of pickups and resonator cones. In the mid-to-late 1990’s, Jay Kirgis, a musician and sculptor in Oxford, Mississippi, created playable, sculptural cigarbox and biscuit tin instruments using pool cues as necks.

The modern revival of cigar box guitars is documented in the 2008 film Songs Inside the Box, which was shot primarily at the Cigar Box Guitar Extravaganza, an annual event held in Huntsville, Alabama, which has since been re-named the World's Longest-Running Cigar Box Guitar Festival. The 19th annual Cigar Box Guitar Festival was held in 2022.

While there are many cigar box guitar builders, selling their guitars online, at music festivals and outdoor markets, Huntsville, Alabama is also home to the only brick-and-mortar cigar box guitar store in the world, exclusively selling cigar box guitars and other cigar box instruments. Located at Lowe Mill Arts & Entertainment, the store was founded in 2010 by John Nickel and his father Pat Nickel, after John attended the Cigar Box Guitar Extravaganza and was inspired to build and play cigar box guitars. Luthier Jeff Mello and his wife Tara took over ownership of the store in February 2021. In November 2021, Mello and the store were featured on the WVTM Chronicle special, "Made in 'Bama," hosted by Lisa Crane.

The Cigar Box Guitar Museum, a free display dedicated to cigar box guitars, is located in Speal’s Tavern, a small blues club in New Alexandria, Pennsylvania. It is curated by cigar box guitarist Shane Speal and contains over 60 antique and modern cigar box guitars.

== Tuning ==
Many different tunings can be used for cigar box guitars. Common tunings are:

- Open tuning
  - three strings: for example A – e – a or G – d – g
  - four strings: for example A – e – a – c#' or G – d – g – b
- Classical tuning of a six-string guitar (E – A – d – g – b – e’)
  - three strings: for example A – d – g
  - four strings: for example d – g – b – e’
- Magic jazz tuning: A – e – g
- Hawaiian tuning: A – e – f#
- Four string banjo tuning: D – G – b – d

== Notable performers ==
- Bo Diddley played a cigar box–shaped guitar.
- Luther Dickinson, the guitarist of the North Mississippi Allstars, uses an electric cigar box guitar called the Lowebow.
- Billy Gibbons of ZZ Top performs with a cigar box guitar.
- Frank Turner plays a four-string cigar box guitar.
- Richard Johnston, the subject of the 2005 Max Shores documentary Richard Johnston: Hill Country Troubadour, performs with a Lowebow. Johnston helped design the instrument with its builder, John Lowe, who first learned of the cigarbox instruments from Jay Kirgis, a builder in Mississippi. Mr. Kirgis had brought one into John Lowe’s store looking for a pickup.
- Bonny B. plays with a cigar box with only two strings (octave chord).
- Tom Waits plays cigar box banjo on his album Real Gone.
- Jon Hembrey, lead guitarist of 2014 Juno nominees the Strumbellas, plays a three-string cigar box guitar.
- Seasick Steve plays several personalized and obscure instruments, including a cigar box guitar.
- Shane Speal, billed as "The King of the Cigar Box Guitar," performs exclusively with cigar box guitars in solo shows and with his group, Shane Speal's Snake Oil Band. He performs with self-built cigar box guitars and also with instruments by Daddy Mojo, Smokehouse Guitars, Tomi-O Hartwell, Johnny Lowebow, Kurt Schoen and Mike Orr.
- Ed King of Lynyrd Skynyrd played a cigar box guitar.
- Harry Manx, a Hindustani slide master, plays a Lowebow cigar box guitar.
- Chris Ballew, lead singer of the Presidents of the United States of America, has recorded with a one-string cigar box bass made by Shane Speal.
- Vic Ruggiero, lead singer of the Slackers, recorded tracks in Japan for his upcoming solo album. He plays a four-string cigar box guitar.
- Joe Buck, performing as a one-man band and also as a member of Hank Williams III's band Assjack.
- PJ Harvey plays a Baratto Cigfiddle.
- Charlie Brown, of the Peanuts comic strip, played a cigar box banjo a few times in his first years (in the early 1950s).
- Lightnin' Hopkins played a cigar box guitar at times and said this on the subject:

So I went ahead and made me a guitar. I got me a cigar box, I cut me a round hole in the middle of it, take me a little piece of plank, nailed it onto that cigar box, and I got me some screen wire and I made me a bridge back there and raised it up high enough that it would sound inside that little box, and got me a tune out of it. I kept my tune and I played from then on.

— Lightnin' Hopkins

- Alain Johannes plays a cigar box guitar throughout his first solo record, "Spark", and also on tour.
- Reverend Peyton of The Reverend Peyton's Big Damn Band plays a three-string cigar box guitar.
- Paul McCartney played a Baratto cigar box guitar on "Cut Me Some Slack", as heard in the documentary Sound City. He also used the guitar for the live debut of the song at the 12-12-12 Concert with grunge band Nirvana (Dave Grohl and Krist Novoselic) and for a subsequent performance on Saturday Night Live.
- Mark Stowe was included on the 2014 album Guitar Wizards Vol. 1 & 2, performing his guitar solo "Hemingway" on a homemade three-string cigar box guitar.
- Samantha Fish plays a four-string cigar box guitar.
- Matthew West plays a cigar box ukulele on his 2017 video for "Come On Christmas".

== See also ==
- Diddley Bow
- Lowebow
- Jug band
- Washtub bass
- Luthier
- Kabosy
- Ramkie
