= Speal =

Speal is a surname. Notable people with the surname include:

- George Nicholas Speal (1932–2008), Canadian lawyer and politician
- Shane Speal (born 1970), American musician
