= The High Water Marks =

American indie rock band

- Origin: Oslo, Norway; Lexington, Kentucky, United States
- Genres: Indie rock Indie pop
- Years active: 2003–present
- Labels: Happy Happy Birthday To Me; Eenie Meenie Records; Jigsaw Records; Minty Fresh Records; Wonderful & Strange Records
- Members: Per Ole Bratset; Hilarie Sidney; Logan R Miller; Øystein Megård
- Past members: Mike Snowden; Jim Lindsay

The High Water Marks is an indie rock band associated with the Elephant 6 collective. The band has two lead creative members, Hilarie Sidney and Per Ole Bratset, who co-write the band's music.

== Band history ==
Hilarie Sidney, drummer for The Apples in Stereo, and Per Ole Bratset of the band Palermo met during an Apples in Stereo performance in Oslo, Norway. The two became friends and began recording songs together through the mail before deciding to record together in the United States. These recordings, with Sidney and Bratset performing all of the instruments themselves, became the High Water Marks' debut album Songs About the Ocean.

Sidney and Bratset, now married, were joined by Jim Lindsay (former Oranger member and Preston School of Industry contributor) and Mike Snowden (known for his work in Von Hemmling and Real Numbers) to play drums and bass, respectively. With this four member lineup, The High Water Marks recorded the album Polar, which was released September 2007.

In 2019, Hilarie and Per Ole started working on a new album with Logan Miller at his home studio in Kentucky. The album was completed while in pandemic lockdown, with Øystein Megård also joining on drums and several other instruments. Logan Miller played bass, guitars and drums. The resulting album, Ecstasy Rhymes, was released worldwide through Minty Fresh Records on November 13, 2020, and in Norway on Wonderful & Strange Records.

== Band members ==
- Per Ole Bratset – guitar, bass, lead vocals
- Hilarie Sidney – guitar, drums, keyboards, lead vocals
- Logan R Miller – bass, guitar, drums, vocals
- Øystein Megård – drums, keyboards, guitar, vocals

== Discography ==
- Songs About the Ocean (2004), Eenie Meenie Records CD/LP (US) and Racing Junior (Europe)
- Polar (2007), Happy Happy Birthday To Me Records CD Wonderful & Strange Records LP (2019 Reissue)
- Arivar Sullimer (2009), The Fox Pop Recording co. Cassette
- Split 7" with Love Letter Band (2010), Happy Happy Birthday to me Records. 7"
- Pretending to be Loud (2012) Jigzaw Records CD
- Annual Rings EP (2013), Peoples King Recording Company, Digital Download
- Ecstasy Rhymes (2020) Minty Fresh Records LP (world) and Wonderful & Strange Records LP (Norway)
- Proclaimer of Things (2022) Minty Fresh Records LP
- Your Next Wolf (2023) Minty Fresh Records LP and 6612 Tapes (cassette)
- More Songs About The Ocean (2024) 6612 Tapes (cassette)
- Consult the Oracle (2025) Meritorio Records LP
