= Chris Campanaro =

American musician, songwriter, bassist

Chris "Cecil" Campanaro is an American musician, songwriter, bassist, best known for his work with Grammy Award-nominated record "American River" featuring Johnny Cash, Kris Kristofferson, Stephen Perkins (Jane's Addiction), along with several others. He is the bassist for several acts including TAXI, Terraplane Sun, The Matt Ellis Band, SOCCERMOM, Musket and has currently been playing with LP (singer).

== Composer/production ==
After leaving the east coast for California, "Cecil" studied under Christy Coobatis in the now rare field of analog recording. After just a short time creating new techniques, his first solo debut record, "Tonewerk…Free Audibles" instantly received acknowledgement by winning the 2001 Media Arts award. Shortly after, he was recruited to Elias Arts to begin a career in composing, writing, and recording music for television and film. He has been involved in literally hundreds of commercials including such clients as Nike, Infiniti, BMW,-- first in his role as chief session engineer and today as a composer of all styles of genres. He has received numerous accolades including a Grammy Award nomination. While at Elias he contributed to such albums as Robert Downey Jr.'s solo record "The Futurist", Tricky "Vulnerable", Lou Rawls "Christmas," and Jonathan Elias' "The Prayer Cycle" which included several artist such as Sting, Alanis Morissette, Perry Farrell, Salif Keita, Rahat Nusrat Fateh Ali Khan, Jonathan Davis of Korn and Jon Anderson. After departing from Elias Arts in 2008 to pursue his own avenues in the field, he started GOLD HEARTED MUSIC Inc. to solidify his place in the advertising world.

== Performer ==
First recognized as the bass player for the female-fronted new wave-punk band SOCCERMOM, Campanaro became a musical collaborator with several other musical artists. SOCCERMOM played alongside artists such as Mike Watt and the Secondmen, Suicidal Tendencies, Eagles of Death Metal, IMA Robot, Joan Jett, Hellride, Circus Diablo, Bad Brains, JFA and Dick Dale.

Recently, Campanaro has recorded bass for a diverse roster of acts including TAXI, Dizzy X, Terraplane Sun, & Ultaviolet Sound, Matt Ellis Band, and Musket.

The trio TAXI has toured with acts such as HELMET, Fireball Ministry, and Mondo Generator (featuring Nick Oliveri from Queens of the Stone Age).

== Recent ==
Campanaro has been serving as the chief composer/arranger/creative director and producer for the Amsterdam-based music house known as Massive Music.

Along with performing/singing and writing for the trio TAXI (2 basses/drums), Cecil has collaborated with fellow musician, Matt Ellis, to support his latest record "Births, Deaths & Marriages." which included a stellar cast of musicians including Greg Leisz (Joni Mitchell, Robert Plant and Alison Krauss, Emmylou Harris), Tim Young (Beck, Daniel Johnston) Calexico's Nick Luca and Jacob Valenzuela.

Chris "Cecil" is currently touring with the California-based band Terraplane Sun, which has recently finished their anticipated studio album (Universal/Trauma 2 Records). Terraplane Sun have been recently touring with acclaimed acts such as Imagine Dragons, The Neighbourhood, Phoenix, Alt-J, and The Alabama Shakes.

== LPs ==
- SOCCERMOM- self-titled
- Terraplane Sun "Coyote"

== EPs ==
- Ya Never Know (2013)
- Generation Blues (to be released in fall 2014)
