= Matt Ellis (Australian musician) =

Australian singer-songwriter (born 1973)

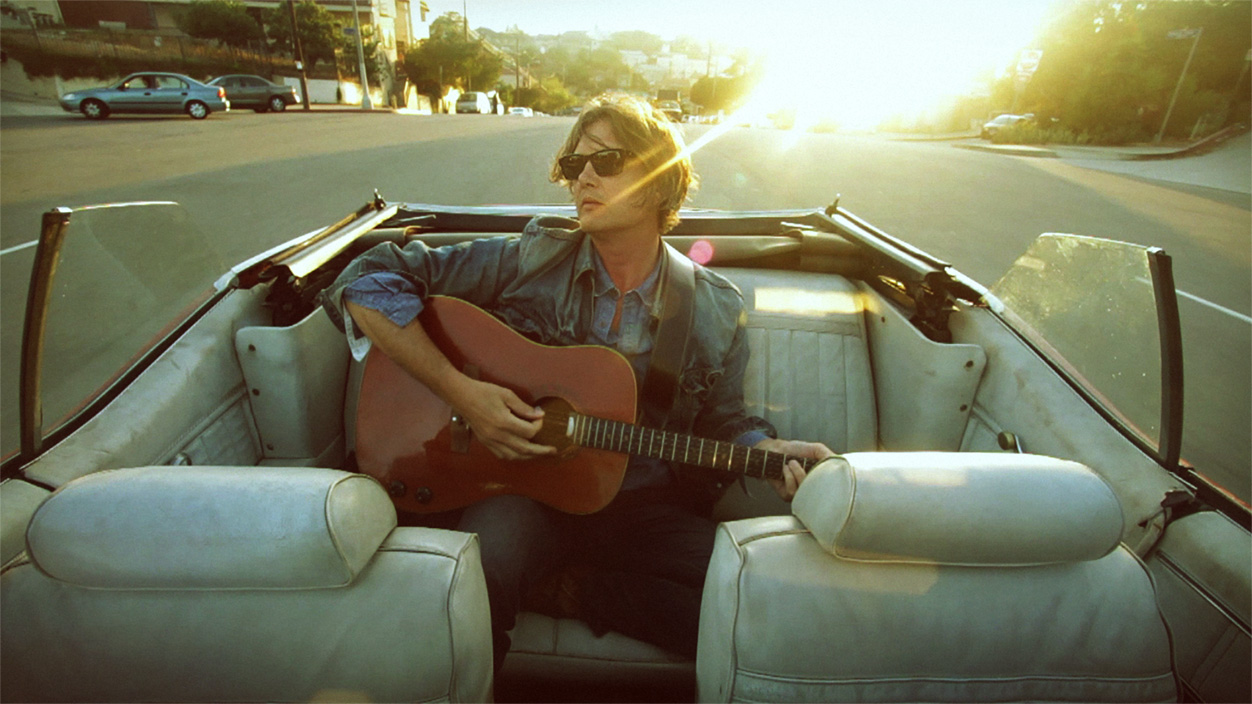
- Matt Ellis - The Greatest Escape

Background information
- Born: Matthew Ellis; 28 December 1973 (age 52)
- Origin: Sydney
- Genres: Americana singer/songwriter, folk/rock
- Years active: 1994 – present
- Label: Krow Pie
- Website: www.mattellis.com

Matt Ellis (born 28 December 1973) is an Americana genre singer-songwriter from Sydney, Australia. Based in the U.S. since 2005, Ellis just released a new single, "Watching You".

== Early years ==
Matt Ellis had an international upbringing, spending his childhood among Sydney's northern beaches, Melbourne, Brisbane, Australia and Wellington, New Zealand before his family's relocation to Hong Kong,– where he spent most of his teenage years attending Island School. Ellis returned to Sydney for his final year of High School, graduating from Davidson High School (New South Wales), before studying Art & Design at College.

Inspired by punk and rock bands of his high school era, Ellis formed heavy-rock band Sedgwick Pie in 1995. With him as their frontman, the group released two EPs, touring with such prominent 90s acts as Reef (UK), Grinspoon (AUS) and Tumbleweed (AUS), before launching his solo career in 2000 with his critically acclaimed debut, Peel.

The release quickly established Ellis on an international stage, with the album sitting in the top 10 on ninemsn for six weeks. The self-produced music video for the title track "Peel" gained airplay on Foxtel's Country Music Channel, MTV Australia, Rage and defunct late-night TV show on Network Ten, Ground Zero. The track was added to rotation in southeast Asia, but was eventually banned after outraged viewers called in to complain that the clip – which featured Ellis driving around Sydney blindfolded – promoted reckless driving. The banning sparked an invitation from Channel V Asia for Ellis to interview and perform live at the station in Hong Kong. This performance wrapped the Peel tour which saw Matt Ellis perform at respected rock music venues CBGBs (New York City) and the Knitting Factory (Los Angeles).

In July 2004, Ellis launched his second, self-titled solo effort at the Vanguard in Sydney. The production team on this album consisted of Ellis and longtime musical collaborator, Tamlin and ARIA Music Awards winner, Jonathan Burnside. As a preview to the forthcoming album, a double A-side single of "In This Life"/"Where It Starts" was launched in August 2003 at Sydney venue The Gaelic Club. Along with more critical acclaim the release also attracted a sponsorship from Cole Clark Guitars Australia. Tracks from the album received airplay on Triple J, Sydney's FBi Radio, Newcastle's New FM, 2NUR and many stations Australia-wide. The album also received airplay on college radio in Germany, Canada and the US.

In 2005, Ellis left Australia and embarked upon a tour across Canada and the US which included shows in and around Vancouver, Hornby and Denman Islands and at the North by Northeast (NxNE) Festival in Toronto. He stayed on the road through July and August playing a twenty-date acoustic tour through New York, Pennsylvania, Toronto, Vancouver, San Francisco and Los Angeles. While on the road he began writing his next release, Tell the People. Writing for the album was completed and a demo was recorded while in creative seclusion in a remote, coastal village in Mexico's Yucatán Peninsula.

== American years ==
Returning to Los Angeles in 2006, Ellis collaborated with fellow musician Branden Harper to produce his third solo album, Tell the People. Recorded at Veneto West Studios in Culver City, California and engineered by Ronan Chris Murphy, the album featured a stellar cast of musicians. The recording sessions included Nels Cline (Wilco) and Tim Young (David Sylvian, The Youngs) on guitar, Greg Leisz (k.d. lang, Beck, Joni Mitchell) on lap steel, pedal steel and mandolin, Tim Luntzel, (Bright Eyes, Norah Jones, Emmylou Harris) on bass, Dave Palmer (Fiona Apple, Air) on piano and Rhodes and Branden Harper on drums. Ellis' wife provided vocals on tracks 10 and 11.

In promotion for this album, Ellis performed across the US, with regular shows at such esteemed Los Angeles music venues as the Hotel Cafe and The Troubadour. He returned to his homeland twice off the back of the album, playing both Brisbane and Sydney, Australia.

Ellis took to the Little Radio stage at South by Southwest, playing multiple days in 2007, 2008, 2009 and 2010.

Ellis' fourth album, Births, Deaths & Marriages, was released in March 2010. Vocals and acoustic guitar were recorded in a Venice Beach loft with drummer Branden Harper once again. The laid-back recording environment suited the songs, and Ellis, perfectly, sometimes capturing and keeping a song played in full for the first time. Over several months, special guest musicians were brought in, adding layers to the songs note by note. Returning guest Greg Leisz (Joni Mitchell, Robert Plant and Alison Krauss, Emmylou Harris) added his haunting, signature pedal steel, lap steel and banjo to four tracks while Tim Young (Beck, Daniel Johnston) channeled the desert through his Telecaster on five of them. Calexico's Nick Luca added further electric guitars, piano and Fender Rhodes while his Calexico bandmate Jacob Valenzuela rounded out two songs with trumpet. This album is inspired by Ellis' travels across the south and his love for the Mississippi Delta region. There was a surprise performance by gospel great (who sang the duet "Gimme Shelter" with Mick Jagger on the Let it Bleed album), Merry Clayton. Ellis mixed the album with Craig Schumacher (Calexico, Devotchka, Iron & Wine, Neko Case, Richard Buckner) at his WaveLab studios in Tucson, Arizona.

The lead single, "Heart of Mine", was featured on Andrew Zimmern's Appetite For Life and received an Honorable Mention in the International Songwriting Competition in the Americana category. "Heart of Mine"'s music video, directed by Ellis, took home third place for Best Video in 2010. Tracks from Births, Deaths & Marriages have received wide AAA radio airplay across the US, including LA's KCSN, operating out of Northridge, California. "Heart of Mine" is featured in the James Franco produced film The Heyday of the Insensitive Bastards.

Ellis' next album, The Greatest Escape, includes 12 new songs produced by Ellis and mixed by Craig Schumacher. This fifth album, recorded and mixed at Wavelab in Tucson, Arizona, has a new, tougher sound that recalls the Australian singer/songwriter's early rock roots. It is available online.

In December 2013, Ellis and his band headed to Tucson and recorded 13 tracks over four days. Produced by Ellis, the live tracks were engineered by Chris Schultz and Craig Schumacher (Neko Case, Calexico, The Jayhawks). Ellis returned home to Los Angeles to complete recording, teaming up with Nick Luca (Calexico, Iron & Wine). The pair spent the following months setting up in multiple home studios adding vocals, Fender Rhodes, piano and additional guitars, before Ellis returned to Tucson to mix the album with Schumacher, the celebrated engineer behind his last two releases.

The result is a loose classic rock feel, steeped in Americana and folk. Ellis' trademark voice is in fine form and the songs have an extra level of detail, but the long list of guest musicians is gone. The band Ellis put together to promote his previous full length, Births, Deaths & Marriages (2010), is still with him, and he was inspired to build this album around them.

Throughout 2013, Ellis was presenting unfinished songs to Josh Norton (guitar), Fern Sanchez (drums), Grant Fitzpatrick (bass), Tim Walker (pedal steel) and his wife Vavine (vocals). The group jammed on songs over multiple sessions, letting arrangements and feel develop naturally, the same approach the band took to the recording sessions.

A double A-side single, "On The Horizon"/"Thank You Los Angeles", was released in late August 2014. The band promoted the new songs around L.A. with a launch at the Del Monte speakeasy, a slot on the Abbot Kinney Fest and the Desert Stars Festival at Pappy & Harriets. Matt Ellis launched his fifth album, The Greatest Escape, on Wednesday 22 October at Harvard & Stone, in Hollywood, California. It became the second most added album to Americana Radio the following month. Ellis promoted the release with performances at the L.A. Vegan Beer Festival at the Rose Bowl in Pasadena, the Americana Festival in Nashville and the Living Room in New York City.

Matt Ellis' latest release is a duet with fellow singer/songwriter Paul Chesne. "They Don't Make 'em Like They Used To" is out now digitally.

Ellis currently resides in Venice Beach, California, US with his wife, Vavine Tahapehi, who has contributed vocals on his past two albums and performs with him on stage. He is currently recording his sixth album.

== Producer ==
In recent years, Matt Ellis has started working with other artists in the role of producer.

Blue-Eyed Son's 2013 release Shadows on the Son was produced by Ellis and released on Eenie Meenie Records. Ellis co-wrote, arranged and performed on the EP.

Lacey Kay Cowden's EP was produced and arranged by Ellis and was to be released in early 2014.

== Discography ==
Artist	Title	Release	Year
Sedgwick Pie	Seed	EP	1996
Sedgwick Pie	Eight Golden Nuts	EP	1997
Matt Ellis	Peel	Album	2000
Matt Ellis	In This Life/Where It Starts	Single	2003
Matt Ellis	Matt Ellis	Album	2004
Matt Ellis	Tell The People	Album	2006
Matt Ellis	Births, Deaths & Marriages	Album	2010
Matt Ellis	Candy/Dangers of the Night	Single	2012
Matt Ellis	The Greatest Escape	Album	2014
Matt Ellis	Another L.A. Christmas	Single	2015
Matt Ellis & Paul Chesne	They Don't Make 'em Like They Used To	Single	2016
Matt Ellis	Some People	Single	2019
Matt Ellis	If I Had a Hammer	Single	2019
Matt Ellis	Rambler Pacifico	Album	2019
Matt Ellis	Desert Gold	Single	2021
Matt Ellis	Coming Back	Single	2023
Matt Ellis	Not Even Springsteen	Single	2025
Matt Ellis	Watching You	Single	2026
