= Spaceflyte =

American experimental pop band

- Origin: Athens, Georgia
- Genres: pop cover version
- Years active: 2015-present
- Label: The Elephant 6 Recording Company
- Members: Robert Schneider; John Ferguson

Spaceflyte is an experimental pop band from The Apples in Stereo's Robert Schneider and John Ferguson and published by The Elephant 6 Recording Company

They have opened for Neutral Milk Hotel in 2015 by playing a cover of "Mystery Juice" from the album Into the Sun by Sean Lennon and will be one of Robert Schneider's main side projects while he is completing Graduate school. They have released one song entitled "Visions of Pluto".

== Discography ==
=== Singles ===
- Visions of Pluto
