= Faraway Places =

American indie rock band

The Faraway Places is an American indie rock band. Originally formed in Boston, Massachusetts, United States, as the Solar Saturday, they changed their name after moving to Los Angeles, California.

== History ==
The group issued its first EP as a self-titled affair under the name Solar Saturday in 2001. Members Chris Colthart and Donna Coppola had previously accompanied Papas Fritas on a tour promoting their third album Buildings and Grounds (2000). Following a move to Los Angeles, the group reconvened with Colthart, Coppola, Chris Phillips, and Scott Barber, and changed its name to Faraway Places. In 2003, they released a full-length on Eenie Meenie Records, which received enough attention to warrant a European release through the Bella Union label. The record won the group comparisons to XTC and the Elephant 6 collective. A follow-up arrived in 2009.

== Members ==
- Chris Colthart - guitar, vocals
- Donna Coppola - keyboard, vocals
- Scott Barber - bass
- Eric Bartels - drums

Former

- Jeff Wright - bass
- Chris Phillips - drums

== Discography ==
Year	Title	Label
2001	Solar Saturday	Near By Music
2003	Unfocus on It	Eenie Meenie
2009	Out of the Rain, the Thunder, and the Lightning	Save It Records
