= 010 (Ulysses album) =

Studio album by ulysses
- Released: October 26, 2004
- Genre: Indie rock, indie pop
- Length: 30:35
- Label: Eenie Meenie Records
- Producer: Robert Schneider

Professional ratings
Review scores
Source	Rating
Allmusic	4/5 stars
Pitchfork Media	6.9/10

010 is the debut studio album by the rock band Ulysses. The album was recorded using one microphone and released in monaural audio (instead of the standard stereo sound that most modern albums take advantage of). This is because the songs on the album were originally intended to be demos, but the band were so satisfied with the performances that only a few overdubs were added for the album release.

== Track listing ==
All tracks are written by Robert Schneider.

No.	Title	Length
1.	"Push You Away"	3:08
2.	"Television"	4:05
3.	"Glacier"	2:44
4.	"The Falcon"	2:25
5.	"Change"	3:26
6.	"Burning You"	3:07
7.	"Frustrated"	2:15
8.	"Castles In Spain"	2:26
9.	"Evening Star"	3:09
10.	"Her Silver Veil"	3:50

== Personnel ==
- Robert Beatty – Synthesizer, Electronics
- John Ferguson – Drums, Vocals (background)
- Ben Fulton – Synthesizer, Bass
- Robert Schneider – Guitar, Vocals
- Steve Keene – Illustrations
- Ulysses – Engineer
- Charlie Watts – Mastering
