= Ulysses (American band) =

American indie rock band

Ulysses is an American indie rock band formed by Robert Schneider (lead vocalist of The Apples in Stereo) along with John Ferguson and Ben Fulton in early 2003. Robert Beatty (of Hair Police) joined later that year. They released their first album, 010, on October 26, 2004, through Eenie Meenie Records. PopMatters noted about it, "010 can be read as Schneider’s break-up record, as it’s lyrically more serious and self-loathing than anything in the Apples’ catalog." The album was released in mono.

== Band history ==
While touring Spain with The Apples in Stereo, Schneider was inspired to write "Push You Away", the first song written for 010. Schneider began writing other songs for the album as well.

Schneider's main influences for the band's songs were The Velvet Underground and My Bloody Valentine.

In Lexington, Kentucky, the band formed by impulse when Schneider invited Ferguson and Fulton to organize songs for Schneider's other side project, Marbles. Schneider asked them to first play his set of 10 songs, and Ulysses was born. The band recorded the album 010 live in Schneider's garage studio, in mono with the drums and amplifiers situated symmetrically around a single microphone. The album was released on Eenie Meenie Records.

In the process of writing and recording 010, Schneider's marriage with Apples in Stereo bandmate Hilarie Sidney ended.

== Discography ==
- 010
