= Richard Johnston (musician) =

American country blues musician

Richard Wayne Johnston is an American country blues musician. In 2001 he won the Blues Foundation's International Blues Challenge and its Albert King Award for most promising blues guitarist.

His work as a street musician on Beale Street in Memphis, Tennessee, was documented in the Alabama PBS film Richard Johnston: Hill Country Troubadour. The film, directed by Max Shores, featured Johnston singing and playing his Lowebow cigar box guitar. It won first place in the professional documentary film category at the 2007 George Lindsey/UNA Film Festival.

Johnston studied under blues artists including R.L. Burnside, Junior Kimbrough and Jessie Mae Hemphill. His first album, Foot Hill Stomp (2002), featured Hemphill on vocals and tambourine, with assistance from R.L. Burnside's grandson, Cedric Burnside, and others.

His second album, Official Bootleg #1 (2004), was assisted by Hemphill, Cedric Burnside, and other artists. Johnston also works under the name Boozer Ramirez in the Hawaiian islands.

== See also ==
- List of films based on blues music
- Memphis blues
