= Goldenboy =

American indie rock band

Goldenboy is an indie rock band from Los Angeles, California.

== Band name and roster ==
Shon Sullivan is Goldenboy, named by Elliott Smith while touring with him in 2000.

The first Goldenboy album, Blue Swan Orchestra, was released in October 2002 on B-Girl Records. Blue Swan Orchestra was recorded at Sullivan's studio in Diamond Bar, California and at singer Josie Cotton's studio in Malibu, California. The track "Summertime" features Elliott Smith on backing vocals.

Goldenboy's second album, "Underneath the Radio" was released in October 2006 on Eenie Meenie Records. Shon Sullivan and Bryan Bos (drums) collaborated with Weezer's former bassist, Matt Sharp on this record.

The album, "Sleepwalker", was released in 2011. "Sleepwalker" was recorded at Interstellar and Leaning Pine studios by Sullivan and Jon Crawford. It was mastered and sequenced by engineer Don Tyler, the mastering engineer behind Elliott Smith's albums.

The fourth album, "The New Familiar," was released on November 20, 2012. It was recorded and produced at the band's studio in the Silverlake neighborhood of Los Angeles, CA.

In 2012, Eenie Meenie Records reissued Blue Swan Orchestra on vinyl to commemorate the 10 year anniversary of Goldenboy's debut.

The band currently consists of Shon Sullivan (lead vocals/guitar/keyboards), Bryan Bos (drums), and Nicole Verhamme (bass guitar, vocals).

== Touring ==
In the summer of 2007, Goldenboy toured with The Rentals and Copeland across the US with Jon Crawford on drums and guitarist Daniel Conrad taking duties on bass.

== Discography ==
- Blue Swan Orchestra (B-Girl Records, 2002)
- Below the Radio (Compilation, Ultra Records, 2004)
- Underneath the Radio (Eenie Meenie Records, 2006)
- Sleepwalker (Eenie Meenie Records, 2011)
- The New Familiar (Eenie Meenie Records, 2012)
