= List of films about blues music =

Films dealing with blues history or prominently featuring blues music as a theme include:

- St. Louis Blues (1929): the only short movie with Bessie Smith
- Blues in the Night (1941)
- Two Girls and a Sailor (1944)
- A Face in the Crowd (1957)
- Sounder (1972)
- Lady Sings The Blues (1972): about Billie Holiday
- Leadbelly (1976): biographical film about Huddie William Ledbetter
- The Blues Brothers (1980)
- Streets of Fire (1984)
- Crossroads (1986): directed by Walter Hill, about a "deal with the devil", with a soundtrack by Ry Cooder and a guitar duel between Ralph Macchio and Steve Vai
- Mo' Better Blues (1990)
- The Search for Robert Johnson (1991): documentary aiming to discover facts and myths about the infamous blues guitarist
- Blues Brothers 2000 (1998)
- O Brother, Where Art Thou? (2000)
- Ghost World (2001)
- Deep Blues: A Musical Pilgrimage to the Crossroads (2003)
- Last of the Mississippi Jukes (2003)
- The Blues, a Musical Journey (2003): Martin Scorsese produced seven documentaries about the blues:
  - Feel Like Going Home (Martin Scorsese): about the African origins of the blues
  - The Soul of a Man (Wim Wenders): about Skip James, Blind Willie Johnson and J. B. Lenoir
  - The Road to Memphis (Richard Pearce) : focuses on B. B. King's contributions
  - Warming by the Devil's Fire (Charles Burnett): fiction on a blues-based theme
  - Godfathers and Sons (Marc Levin): about Chicago blues and hip-hop
  - Red, White & Blues (Mike Figgis): about British blues-influenced music (e.g., Tom Jones, Van Morrison)
  - Piano Blues (Clint Eastwood): focuses on blues pianists such as Ray Charles and Dr. John
- Ray (2004)
- Richard Johnston: Hill Country Troubadour (2005): Max Shores documentary about R. L. Burnside, Jessie Mae Hemphill, Junior Kimbrough, Richard Johnston, and other north Mississippi hill country blues musicians
- You See Me Laughin' (2005): directed by Mandy Stein, documentary that takes a look at the often untamed lifestyles of the last great North Mississippi bluesmen and the Oxford, Mississippi–based label (Fat Possum Records) that struggles to record them
- Black Snake Moan (2007)
- Honeydripper (2007)
- Cadillac Records (2008)
- Who Do You Love? (2008)
- Bessie (2015)
- Ma Rainey's Black Bottom (2020)
- Sinners (2025)
