= Wesseh Freeman =

Liberian musician

Wessay
- Born: Wesseh Freeman; 1976
- Origin: Monrovia, Liberia
- Died: 27 February 2018 (aged 41–42)
- Instruments: Guitar, vocals

Wesseh Freeman (or Weesay, 1976–2018) was a musician from Monrovia, Liberia.

== Biography ==
He became blind as a child and turned to playing the guitar to support himself and his family. He was self-taught, and built his guitars out of oil cans.

A video of him playing on the street went viral in 2016, and a Facebook page created for him garnered more than 7 million visitors. Freeman also demonstrated how he built his guitars, from an oil can, a neck shaped with a machete, and strings from bicycle cables. He said he made $4 a day playing his instrument. It brought him international attention (from people like Shane Speal) as well as funding to build him a home.

He died on 27 February 2018 in a road accident in Monrovia.
