= Bruce Haack =

Canadian musician and composer

- Also known as: Jackpine Savage, Jacques Trapp
- Born: Bruce Clinton Haack; May 4, 1931; Nordegg, Alberta, Canada
- Died: September 26, 1988 (aged 57) West Chester, Pennsylvania, United States
- Genres: Children's, electronic, space age pop
- Occupations: Musician, producer
- Instruments: Synthesizer, voice, vocoder
- Years active: 1955–1988
- Label: Dimension 5, Columbia
- Formerly of: Ted Pandel, Russell Simmons
- Website: www.brucehaack.com

Bruce Clinton Haack (May 4, 1931 – September 26, 1988) was a Canadian musician and composer in the field of electronic music.

== Biography ==
=== From Alberta to New York (1931–1963) ===
Bruce Haack played on his family's piano at the age of three, and was providing piano lessons for others by the time he was a teenager.

While attending college in Edmonton, Canada, at the University of Alberta, Haack began performing in local venues with a then-popular local band called The Swing Tones. While the band played primarily modern and old-time music, they also performed Ukrainian Folk music, which introduced Haack to Eastern musical motifs and themes. This exposure would prove to have a significant influence on Haack's work later in life. Prior to leaving Alberta to move to New York City, Haack assembled a large record collection of music from many parts of the world.

At this time, Bruce Haack is remembered as having the ability to hear music and play it back immediately from memory, and would improvise riffs.

Haack was also invited by Aboriginal peoples in Canada to participate in their pow-wows, experimenting with peyote, which influenced his music for years to come. His upbringing in the isolated town of Rocky Mountain House in Alberta, Canada, gave him plenty of time to develop his musical talents.

Seeking formal training to hone his ability, Haack applied to the University of Alberta's music program. Haack was rejected from the music program because of his poor notation skills, however at the University of Alberta he wrote and recorded music for campus theater productions, hosted a radio show, and played in a band. He received a degree in psychology from the university; this influence was felt later in songs that dealt with body language and the computer-like ways children absorb information.

New York City's Juilliard School offered Haack the opportunity to study with composer Vincent Persichetti; thanks to a scholarship from the Canadian government, he headed to New York upon graduating from Edmonton in 1954. At Juilliard, Haack met a like-minded student, Ted "Praxiteles" Pandel, with whom he developed a lifelong friendship. However, his studies proved less sympathetic, and he dropped out of Juilliard just eight months later, rejecting the school's restrictive approach.

Throughout the rest of his career, Haack rejected restrictions of any kind, often writing several different kinds of music at one time. He spent the rest of the 1950s scoring dance and theater productions, as well as writing pop songs for record labels like Dot Records and Coral Records. Haack's early scores, like 1955's Les Etapes, suggested the futuristic themes and experimental techniques Haack developed in his later works. Originally commissioned for a Belgian ballet, Les Etapes mixed tape samples, electronics, soprano, and violin; the following year, he finished a musique concrète piece called "Lullaby for a Cat".

As the 1960s began, the public's interest in electronic music and synthesizers increased, and so did Haack's notoriety. Along with songwriting and scoring, Haack appeared on TV shows like I've Got a Secret and The Tonight Show starring Johnny Carson, usually with Pandel in tow. The duo often played the Dermatron, a touch- and heat-sensitive synthesizer, on the foreheads of guests; 1966's appearance on I've Got a Secret featured them playing 12 "chromatically pitched" young women.

Meanwhile, Haack wrote serious compositions as well, such as 1962's "Mass for Solo Piano", which Pandel performed at Carnegie Hall, and a song for Rocky Mountain House's 50th anniversary. One of his most futuristic pieces, 1963's "Garden of Delights", mixed Gregorian chants and electronic music. This work was never broadcast or released in its complete form.

==== From children's music to Electric Lucifer (1963–1976) ====
Haack found another outlet for his creativity as an accompanist for children's dance teacher Esther Nelson. Perhaps inspired by his own lonely childhood, he and Nelson collaborated on educational, open-minded children's music. With Pandel, they started their own record label, Dimension 5 Records, on which they released 1962's Dance, Sing, and Listen. Two other records followed in the series, 1963's Dance, Sing, and Listen Again and 1965's Dance, Sing, and Listen Again & Again. The records included activity and story songs typical of those found on other children's records at the time. The music moves freely between country, medieval, classical, and pop, and mixes instruments like piano, synthesizers, and banjo. Lyrics deal with music history or provide instructions like, "When the music stops, be the sound you hear", which resulted in an often surreal collage of sounds and ideas.

The otherworldly quality of Haack's music was emphasized by the instruments and recording techniques he developed with the Dance, Sing, and Listen series. Though he had little formal training in electronics, he made synthesizers and modulators out of any gadgets and surplus parts he could find, including guitar effects pedals and battery-operated transistor radios. Eschewing diagrams and plans, Haack improvised, creating instruments capable of 12-voice polyphony and random composition. Using these modular synthesizer systems, he then recorded with two two-track reel-to-reel decks, adding a moody tape echo to his already distinctive pieces.

As the 1960s progressed and the musical climate became more receptive to his kind of whimsical innovation, Haack's friend, collaborator, and business manager Chris Kachulis found mainstream applications for his music. This included scoring commercials for clients like Parker Brothers Games, Goodyear Tires, Kraft Cheese, and Lincoln Life Insurance; in the process, Haack won two awards for his work. He also continued to promote electronic music on television, demonstrating his homemade device encased in a suitcase on Mister Rogers' Neighborhood in 1968, where he sampled a song by the Rolling Stones entitled "Citadel". He released The Way-Out Record for Children later that year.

Kachulis did another important favor for his friend by introducing Haack to psychedelic rock. Acid rock's expansive nature was a perfect match for Haack's style, and in 1969 he released his first rock-influenced work, The Electric Lucifer. A concept album about the earth being caught in the middle of a war between heaven and hell, The Electric Lucifer featured a heavy, driving sound complete with Moog synthesiser, Kachulis' singing, and Haack's homegrown electronics including a prototype vocoder and unique lyrics, which deal with "powerlove" — a force so strong and good that it will not only save mankind but Lucifer himself. Kachulis helped out once more by bringing Haack and Lucifer to the attention of Columbia Records, who released it as Haack's major-label debut.

As the 1970s started, Haack's musical horizons continued to expand. After the release of The Electric Lucifer, he continued on Lucifer's rock-influenced musical approach with 1971's Together, an electronic pop album that marked his return to Dimension 5. Perhaps in an attempt to differentiate this work from his children's music, he released it under the name Jackpine Savage, the only time he used this pseudonym.

Haack continued making children's albums as well, including 1972's Dance to the Music, 1974's Captain Entropy, and 1975's This Old Man, which featured science fiction versions of nursery rhymes and traditional songs. After relocating to West Chester, Pennsylvania, to spend more time with Pandel, Haack focused on children's music almost exclusively, writing music for Scholastic Corporation like "The Witches' Vacation" and "Clifford the Small Red Puppy." He also released Funky Doodle and Ebenezer Electric (an electronic version of Charles Dickens' A Christmas Carol) in 1976, but by the late 1970s, his prolific output slowed. Two works, 1978's Haackula and the following year's Electric Lucifer Book II, were never released.

=== From Party Machine to death (1977–1988) ===
Haackula, Haack's darkest album, struck out into dark, yet playful territory. It seems to have inspired Haack's final landmark work, 1981's Bite. The albums share several song titles and lyrics tone different from Haack's usually idealistic style. Though Bite is harsher than his other works, it features his innovative, educational touch: A thorough primer on electronics and synthesizers makes up a large portion of the liner notes, and Haack adds a new collaborator for this album, 13-year-old vocalist Ed Harvey.

Haack's failing health slowed Dimension 5's musical output in the early 1980s, but Nelson and Pandel kept the label alive by publishing songbooks, like Fun to Sing and The World's Best Funny Songs, and re-released selected older albums as cassettes which are still available today. In 1982, Haack recorded his swan song, a proto hip-hop collaboration with Def Jam's Russell Simmons, entitled "Party Machine". Haack died in 1988 from heart failure, but his label and commitment to making creative children's music survives. While Dimension 5's later musical releases — mostly singalong albums featuring Nelson — may lack the iconoclastic spark of the early records, Nelson and Pandel's continued work reveals the depth of their friendship with Haack, a distinctive and pioneering electronic musician.

== Musical inventions ==
- Mid 1950s: Peopleodian – an analog synthesizer ran on a 9 volt battery and used to play tones and pitches on people. Different versions of the device included 'M' and the Dermatron
- Mid 1960s: Mr C – an analog synthesizer in the form of a robot and programmed to play music for live audiences
- 1967: The Musical Computer – a home-built digital/analog synthesizer and digital sampler encased in a suitcase which used sensors and skin touch to trigger lights and sounds, named by Fred Rogers
- 1968: Farad – a motion-controlled vocoder, named after Michael Faraday

== Documentaries ==
Haack: The King of Techno is a documentary film about Bruce Haack by Philip Anagnos. It was released in 2004 at the Slamdance Film Festival, distributed by Koch Vision and televised on DOC: The Documentary Channel, Sky Italia, and Sveriges Television. It features interviews with some of Haack's associates and collaborators such as Ted "Praxiteles" Pandel, Esther Nelson and Chris Kachulis as well as contemporary artists including Eels, Mouse On Mars, Money Mark, and Peanut Butter Wolf. Additionally, the film includes archival footage of Haack's appearances on various talk shows and Mister Rogers' Neighborhood. In 2013, the documentary was re-released by Bleep.com, a division of Warp Records.

== Tribute albums ==
In 2005, a tribute album was released entitled Dimension Mix. A tribute to Dimension 5 Records featuring covers of Bruce Haack songs by Beck, Stereolab, and others, the project was produced by longtime friend and Beck collaborator, Ross Harris, whose autistic child, and godson to Beck, inspired the album.

== Discography ==
=== Albums ===
Year	Album	UK	US	Additional information
1963	Dance Sing and Listen	-	-	
1964	Dance Sing and Listen Again	-	-	
1965	Dance Sing and Listen Again and Again	-	-	
1968	The Way-Out Record for Children	-	-	Identified by Nick DiFonzo as having one of the worst album covers of all time.
1969	Electronic Record for Children	-	-	
1970	The Electric Lucifer	-	-	
1971	Together	-	-	as Jackpine Savage
1972	Dance to the Music	-	-	
1974	Captain Entropy	-	-	
1975	This Old Man	-	-	
1976	Funky Doodle	-	-	
1976	Ebenezer Electric	-	-	
1978	Haackula	-	-	Unreleased because of content
1979	Electric Lucifer Book II	-	-	Released in 2001
1981	Bite	-	-	Reversioning of Haackula
1981	Zoot Zoot Zoot Here Comes Santa In His New Space Suit	-	-	Commissioned work w/ Tiny Tim

=== Singles ===
- 1955: "Les Etapes"
- 1956: "Lullaby for a Cat"
- 1979: "Icarus"
- 1983: "Party Machine" – collaboration w/ Russell Simmons

=== Compilations ===
- 1998: Hush Little Robot – QDK Media
- 1999: Listen Compute Rock Home – Emperor Norton Records
- 2002: Electronic 01 – Mean Old Devil – Mute Records
- 2007: Badd Santa – I Like Christmas – Stones Throw Records
- 2010: Farad: The Electric Voice – Stones Throw Records
- 2011: Bruce Haack Remixed – Stones Throw Records
- 2018: Preservation Tapes EP – Telephone Explosion Records

=== Covers ===
- 2005: Dimension Mix: A Tribute to Dimension 5 Records - Eenie Meenie Records

=== Samples ===
- 1968: Bruce samples and loops the Rolling Stones' "Citadel" on a homemade instrument on Mister Rogers' Neighborhood
- 2006: J Dilla sampled Bruce Haack's "Mean Old Devil" on his critically acclaimed album Donuts
- 2006: Cut Chemist samples Bruce Haack's "School For Robots" on (My 1st) Big Break
- 2019: Kanye West samples Bruce Haack's "Blow Job" on "Water", a song off of his 2019 Christian hip-hop album Jesus Is King

=== Film and television ===
- 1958: I've Got a Secret
- 1965: The Mike Douglas Show
- 1965: The Tonight Show
- 1968: Mister Rogers' Neighborhood

=== Music videos ===
- 2005: "Funky Lil Song" – Beck, Dir. Joel Fox/Ross Harris, Eenie Meenie Records
- 2005: "Rain of Earth" – Stones Throw Singers, Dir. Joel Fox/Ross Harris, Eenie Meenie Records
- 2011: "Party Machine" – Prince Language Afterparty Edit, Dir. Philip Anagnos, Stones Throw Records

== See also ==
- Leon Theremin
- Raymond Scott
- Robert Moog
- Jim Copp
- Bebe and Louis Barron
