= Songs About the Ocean =

Songs About The Ocean

Studio album by The High Water Marks
- Released: September 14, 2004
- Recorded: January – August 2003 in Oslo, Norway and Lexington, Kentucky
- Genre: Indie rock
- Length: 37:50
- Label: Eenie Meenie Records (US), Racing Junior (UK)

The High Water Marks chronology
Songs About The Ocean (2004)	Polar (2007)

Professional ratings
Review scores
Source	Rating
Allmusic	3.5/5 stars
Pitchfork Media	6.8/10
PopMatters	positive

Songs About the Ocean is the 2004 debut album from The High Water Marks.

== Track listing ==
All tracks written by Hilarie Sidney and Per Ole Bratset.

1. "Good I Feel Bad" – 2:36
2. "Slowhand" – 2:48
3. "Have Another Dream" – 2:25
4. "Queen of Verlaine" – 3:27
5. "Suicide" – 2:47
6. "Sixth of July" – 3:36
7. "About The Ocean" – 2:52
8. "Five Thousand" – 2:53
9. "Second Time" – 2:54
10. "National Time" – 2:34
11. "Feel Everything" – 3:03
12. "Things To Do" – 2:26
13. "High Water Marks" – 3:36
14. "Little Mermaid"

== Personnel ==
All instruments and vocals on Songs About the Ocean were performed by Hilarie Sidney and Per Ole Bratset. The album was recorded between January and August 2003 through the mail in Oslo, Norway at the Gyldenlöve Hotel room 528, and Lexington, Kentucky at Pet Sounds Studio. Artwork for the album is by Per Ole Bratset. The album was mixed by Robert Schneider at Pet Sounds Studio, and mastered by Charlie Watts at Technovoice Mastering in Los Angeles, California. A&R by Josh Bloom.
