= Locksley (band) =

American pop rock band

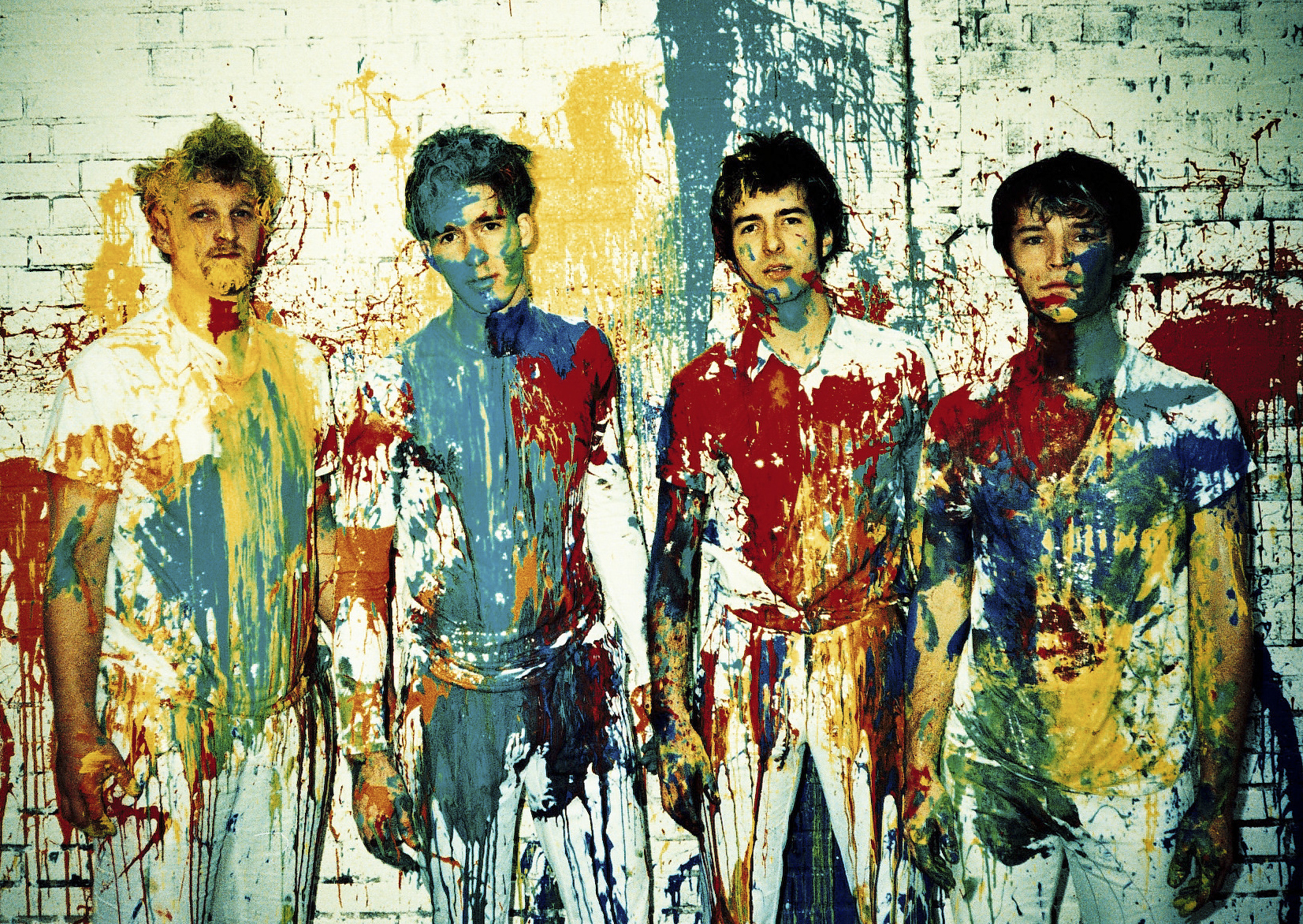
- from left to right: Sam Bair, Jordan Laz, Jesse Laz, Kai Kennedy

Background information
- Origin: Madison, Wisconsin, United States
- Genres: Power pop, indie rock, alternative rock, garage rock revival
- Years active: 2003–present
- Label: Feature
- Members: Jesse Laz (lead vocals, rhythm guitar); Kai Kennedy (lead guitar, vocals); Jordan Laz (bass, vocals); Sam Bair (drums)
- Past members: Aaron Collins (2003–2008)
- Website: http://www.locksley.com

Locksley is an indie four-piece pop rock/power pop band from Madison, Wisconsin. They are self-released on their own Feature Records label. Their songwriting is heavily influenced by early British Invasion bands with an instrumental style based more on early American punk bands and modern garage rock groups. The band describe their sound as doo-wop punk.

== Beginnings, Don't Make Me Wait (2003–2009) ==
Locksley was formed in Madison, Wisconsin in 2003 by Jesse Laz, Sam Bair, Kai Kennedy and Aaron Collins. They were students at Madison West High School. The band relocated to New York shortly after forming. Their first show was September 10, 2003, at the CBGB Gallery. They recorded a CD of demos in their apartment called Safely From the City, which they self-released in the fall of 2004. Only 1000 copies were ever printed.

In 2005 Locksley released a five-song, self-titled EP. Several tracks off Locksley were licensed for commercials, including "Don't Make Me Wait" and "She Does" to Payless Shoes and "Don't Make Me Wait" to the STARZ network. Locksley was featured in the STARZ ad campaign as well, in a music video shot by the network. The EP and the licensing exposure attracted some label interest, though ultimately they never signed a record contract, instead releasing "Don't Make Me Wait" (a collection that included a mix of originals, tracks from the Locksley EP and some rerecordings of songs off Safely From the City) on their own Feature Records label in January 2007. (It was later released in Japan on Fabtone Records in June 2007 and in France on Minimum Records in August 2008). This release would be their first studio album and first broad album release. The band cites "Don't Make Me Wait" as their first album.

On January 18, 2008, Locksley announced on their website that bassist Aaron Collins would be leaving the band. Jordan Laz, Jesse Laz's younger brother, played bass for the band during a performance at the Mercury Lounge in New York City on March 20, 2008. He was officially announced as the band's new bassist the following day. Shortly thereafter, Locksley left on tour as direct support for Rooney and spent the rest of the spring in between tours with Rooney and The Hives. "Don't Make Me Wait" was rereleased on September 9, 2008.

== Television, press and placements ==
Locksley performed "Don't Make Me Wait", "Let Me Know" and "She Does" on Jimmy Kimmel Live! March 2, 2007. They performed "Let Me Know" on Late Night with Conan O'Brien on August 13, 2007. MTV made Locksley their Featured Artist of the Week for two weeks straight from September 8 to 22, 2008.

After the release of Don't Make Me Wait, Locksley were featured in multiple magazine spreads, notably SPIN's "Breaking Out", Rolling Stone's "6 Breakout Bands to Watch", Alternative Press's "100 Bands You Need To Know" and in ELLE with an eight-page fashion spread in their March 2007 issue. They also performed the national anthem as well as "Oh! Wisconsin" during halftime at the 2011 Christmas game against the Chicago Bears. They are now the first and only band to perform at halftime at Lambeau Field.

Many of the songs off of Don't Make Me Wait were licensed for TV, commercials and movies, notably: "She Does" as the theme to HLN's Morning Express with Robin Meade, placement in the Friday the 13th remake, "Don't Make Me Wait" as the trailer music to the Paul Rudd and Eva Longoria movie Over Her Dead Body and "My Kind of Lover" in the J. J. Abrams-produced Cloverfield.

On August 24, 2008, "All Over Again," "Don't Make Me Wait," and "She Does" were made available as downloadable content for the popular Xbox 360 and PlayStation 3 game series Rock Band. The songs have been downloaded over 60,000 times to date. Locksley credits licenses with keeping the band going.

Locksley wrote the song "Slink (A Hymn)" for use as the theme song to FOX's TV show The Good Guys.

"On Fire" was featured on the soundtrack and end credits of the 2011 film Scream 4.

Owens Community College uses "The Whip" in a number of radio and TV commercials. "The Whip" is also used in an American Family Insurance commercial, and has been used by the Colorado Avalanche, Columbus Blue Jackets, Detroit Red Wings, Vancouver Canucks, Toronto Maple Leafs, Dallas Stars, and Florida Panthers as their goal song at some point since the 2011-12 NHL season. The ECHL hockey team Toledo Walleye, and AIHL ice hockey team the Melbourne Mustangs also use the song as their goal song. The Cincinnati Reds have also used the song when they hit a home run.

The season two premiere of The Detour (TV series) features "Black Ajax" in two scenes.

== Be in Love (2009–2010) ==
Locksley began recording their second studio album Be in Love at the beginning of January 2009. Locksley announces Be in Love to be released January 26 as well as an opening slot as direct support for Mae on their Afternoon Tour.

The band's first-ever single release, "Darling, It's True", was released September 22, 2009, digitally and as the A-side to a 7" released on Steven Van Zandt's Wicked Cool Records. B-sides were "There's a Love" (a William Bell cover) and "Talk to Me" (an original Locksley song by Kai Kennedy).

The Be in Love release was pushed back to February 23 for the album digitally and March 16 in stores.

The video for "The Whip" premiered to fans on June 13, 2010, via Locksley's website. Immediately following the debut the band joined fans for a live chat about the video and upcoming tour. No dates had been set.

The Whip has been used as the scoring song for some professional sports teams, which include Major League Baseball's Cincinnati Reds and the American Hockey League's Cleveland Monsters, who adopted it when affiliating with the National Hockey League's Columbus Blue Jackets, who also use it.

The Ontario Hockey League's Sudbury Wolves have also used "The Whip" as its goal song since the 2022-2023 season.

== Locksley album (2011) ==
Locksley released their third full-length album on July 12, 2011.

== Touring ==
Locksley's first national shows were a club tour with San Francisco's Scissors for Lefty in early 2007. They followed that as support on The Rapture's early 2007 Pieces of the People We Love tour. That summer Locksley performed at the MIDI festival in Beijing, China and the Summersonic Festival in Tokyo, Japan. In late 2007 they were direct support on Hanson's The Walk tour. In early/mid-2008 they were direct support on Rooney's U.S. tour and The Hives U.S./Canada tour. In late 2008 they headlined MTV's Choose or Lose Tour and in late 2008 they were direct support and the backing band for Ray Davies on his U.S. tour. In late 2009 they were direct support for Mae on their Afternoon Tour. In Dec. 2009 Locksley announced a spring Japan tour, as direct support for The Bawdies. In early and mid-2010, Locksley were the opening act for Butch Walker on his North American tour. As of 2013, the band has started a social networking campaign using the Twitter hashtag #whereislocksley accompanied by anonymous photos to play a number of secret shows in cities like Tucson, AZ and Uncasville, CT. In January 2015, Locksley was featured during the National Hockey League's All-Star Game in Columbus, Ohio.

== Discography ==
=== Albums ===
- Safely from the City
- Don't Make Me Wait (2007/2008, rerelease)
- Be in Love (2010)
- Locksley (2011)
- Forward (2018)

=== EPs ===
- Locksley (2005)
- Garage Sale (2008)
- Ghosts (2011)
- Forward | Summer (2016)
- Forward | Fall (2016)

=== Singles ===
- "Darling, It's True" (2009)
- "The Whip" (2010)
- "Black Ajax" (2012)
- "Hype" (2012)
- "Holiday" (2012)
- "Let It Ride" (2014)
- "Spooky" (2020)
