= Scissors for Lefty =

American indie rock band

Scissors For Lefty
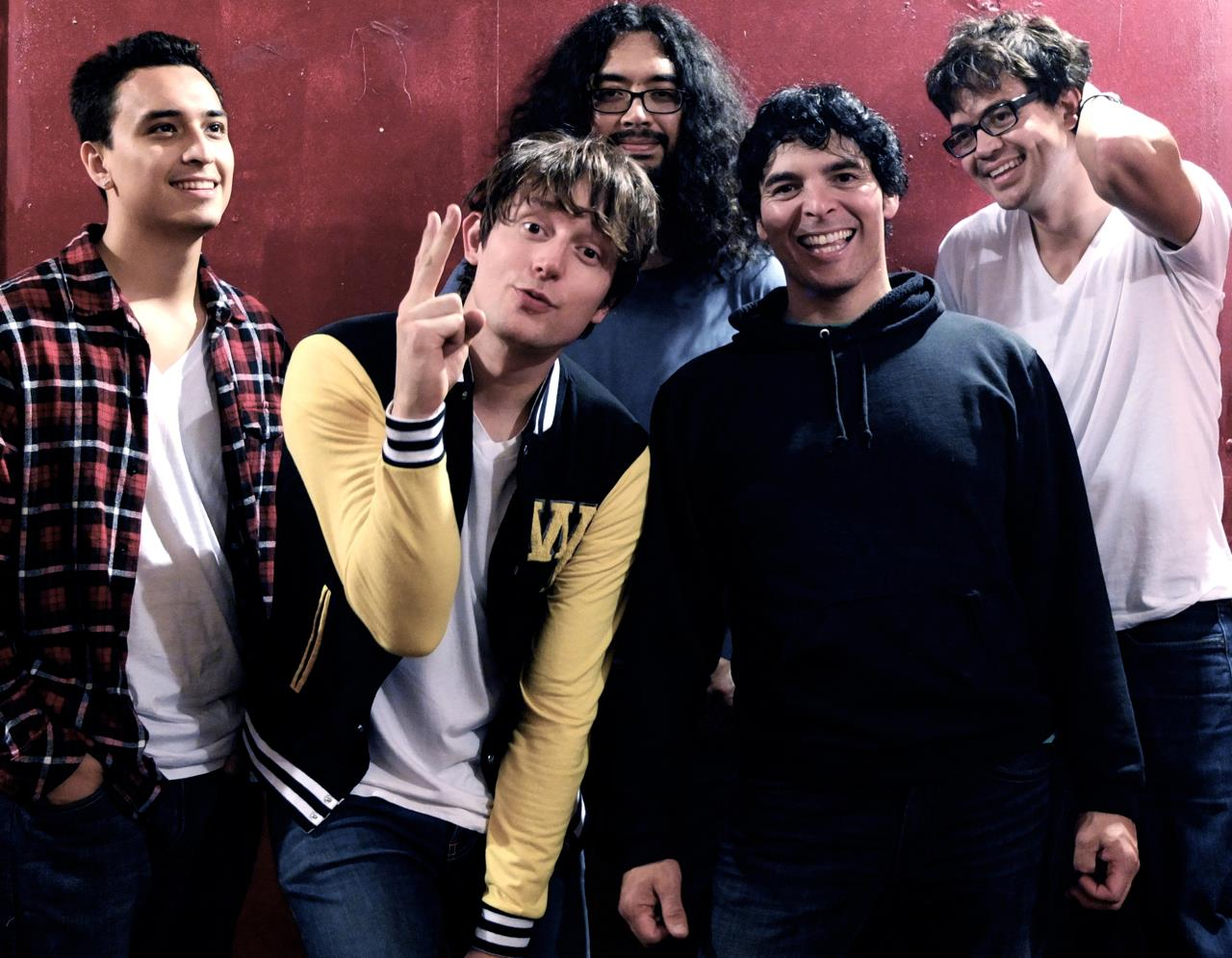
- Left to right: Eric Garza, Bryan Garza, James Krimmel, Robby Garza, Peter Krimmel

Background information
- Origin: San Luis Obispo, California, United States
- Genres: Indie rock
- Years active: 2000–present
- Labels: Eenie Meenie Records (US); Rough Trade Records (UK)
- Members: Bryan Garza (lead vocals, guitar); Peter Krimmel (keyboards, guitar); James Krimmel (drums); Robby Garza (bass guitar, guitar); Eric Garza (bass guitar)
- Website: Official website

Scissors For Lefty is an indie rock band based in San Francisco, California, USA. The band's first album, Bruno, was released in 2005 by Rough Trade Records (UK).

== Biography ==
Three of the band members, Bryan Garza, Peter Krimmel and James Krimmel, met in San Luis Obispo while attending college, and later moved to San Francisco. The band consists of two sets of families : Bryan, Robby, Steve and Eric Garza, with Peter and James Krimmel.

Scissors For Lefty has released three full-length albums. The first, Bruno in 2005, was self-produced and released by the band. Underhanded Romance was released by Eenie Meenie Records on June 12, 2007, and on the iTunes Store on May 29, 2007. A 5-song EP, Consumption Junction, was released on October 24, 2008. The third full-length album, Bangs & Lashes, was released on iTunes on October 29, 2014. The video for the title track was released on May 6, 2013.

A local radio station, Live 105, chose the band to play on the main stage of its BFD 2007 festival, along with Bloc Party, Social Distortion, Queens of the Stone Age, Interpol and Kaiser Chiefs. Each year, Live 105 chooses a local band it thinks has a good chance to be successful, and givesit a chance to play to a much bigger audience. BFD was held at the Shoreline Amphitheater on June 9, 2007.

Scissors For Lefty has toured with Arctic Monkeys, The Smashing Pumpkins, Erasure, Fiery Furnaces, Dirty Pretty Things, The Matches, The 1990s, The Hedrons, Juliette and the Licks, Locksley, French Kicks, Fiery Furnaces and Metric.

Scissors For Lefty personnel
(2000–2002)	Bryan Garza — vocals, guitar; Peter Krimmel — piano, guitar; James Krimmel — drums
(2002–2004)	Bryan Garza — vocals, guitar; Peter Krimmel — piano, guitar; James Krimmel — drums; Robby Garza — bass guitar, guitar; Chris Simmons - drums
(2005–2006)	Bryan Garza — vocals, guitar; Peter Krimmel — piano, guitar; James Krimmel — drums; Robby Garza — bass guitar, guitar
(2006–2011)	Bryan Garza — vocals, guitar; Peter Krimmel — piano, guitar; James Krimmel — drums; Robby Garza — guitar; Steven Garza — bass guitar
(2012–present)	Bryan Garza — vocals, guitar; Peter Krimmel — piano, guitar; James Krimmel — drums; Robby Garza — guitar; Eric Garza - bass guitar

== Discography ==
=== Albums ===
- Bruno (2005)
- Underhanded Romance (2007)
- Bangs & Lashes (2014)

=== EPs ===
- Scissors For Lefty EP (2006)
- Consumption Junction EP (2008)

=== Singles ===
- "Ghetto Ways" (2006)
- "Mama Your Boys Will Find A Home" b/w "Inevitable Thieves" (2006)
- "Not For Keeps" (2012)
