= Terraplane Sun =

American sunshine pop band

- Origin: Venice, Los Angeles, United States
- Genres: Alternative rock, indie rock, sunshine pop
- Years active: 2010-2017
- Label: Trauma2 Records
- Members: Ben Rothbard; Johnny Zambetti; Chris "Cecil" Campanaro; Gabe Feenberg; Lyle Riddle

Terraplane Sun is an American band from Venice, Los Angeles. It was formed by Ben Rothbard (lead vocals, guitar, harmonica), Johnny Zambetti (lead guitar, mandolin, vocals), Chris "Cecil" Campanaro (bass, vocals), Gabe Feenberg (lap steel guitar, accordion, trombone), and Lyle Riddle (drums). The band is best known for the Get Me Golden single.

On April 14, 2017, Terraplane Sun announced that the band would rebrand themselves as The Palms following a record label dispute.

== In Film and TV ==
Their music appeared in Hollywood films, including 21 Jump Street, Playing for Keeps, What To Expect When You're Expecting, as well as popular TV series like Teen Wolf, Suits, Franklin & Bash, Nurse Jackie, and the theme for A&E's show Relapse. Their most popular single Get Me Golden appeared in Saints Row IV, Royal Pains as well as in a commercial for Chili's restaurants, and briefly cracked the Top 50 on the MediaBase Alternative charts.

== EPs ==
- Ya Never Know (2013)
- Generation Blues (to be released in fall 2015)
