= Papas Fritas =

American indie rock band

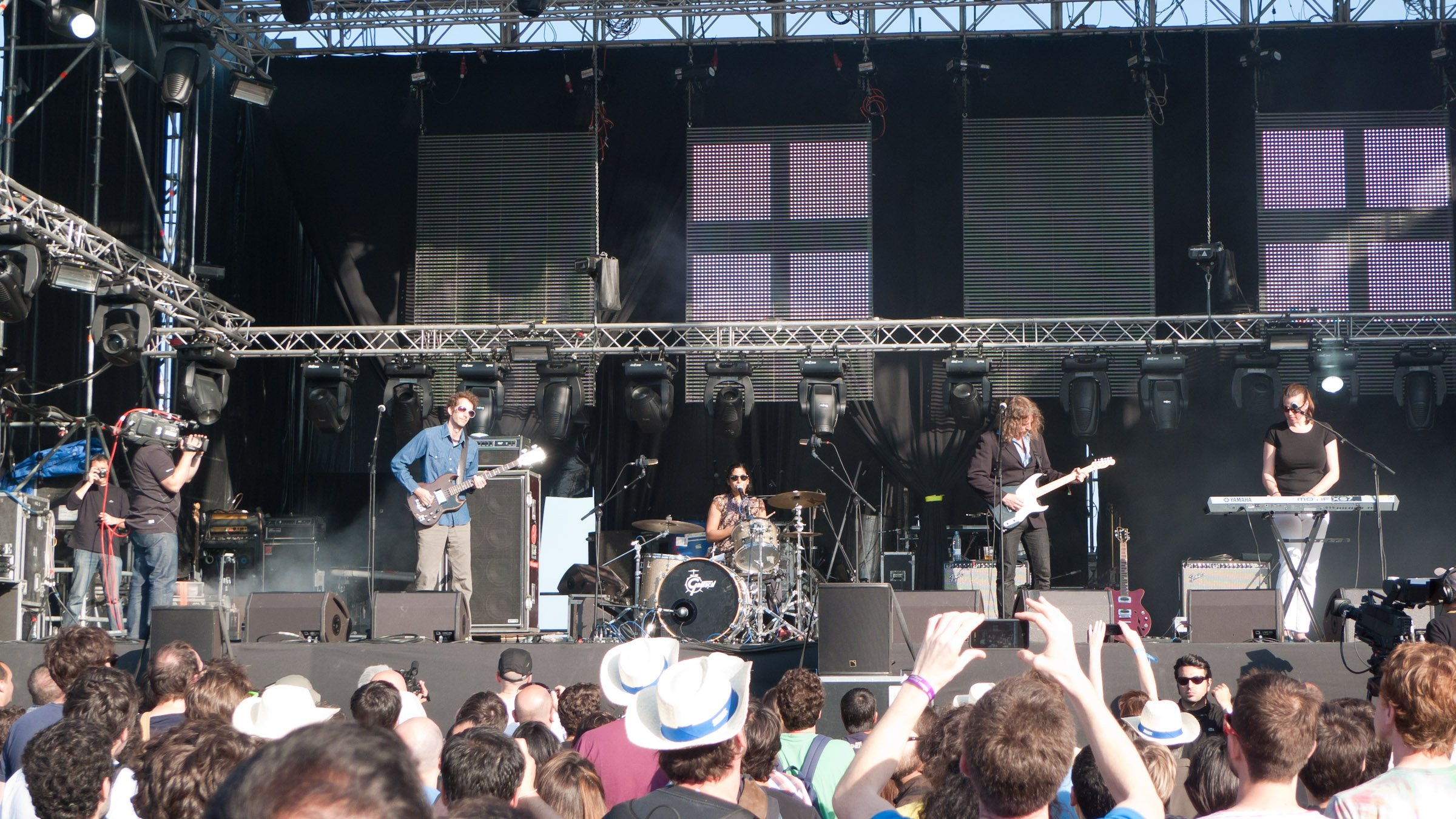
- Papas Fritas performing at the Primavera Sound festival in Barcelona, Spain, on May 28, 2011

Background information
- Origin: Somerville, Massachusetts, United States
- Genres: Indie rock
- Years active: 1992–2000
- Label: Minty Fresh
- Members: Shivika Asthana; Keith Gendel; Tony Goddess
- Website: papasfritas.com

Papas Fritas (typically stylized as pApAs fritAs) were an American indie rock band that formed in 1992 and released three studio albums before breaking up in 2000. The band's name is Spanish for "fried potatoes" (specifically "French fries" in American English) but is also a pun on the phrase "Pop has freed us," which they used as both the name of their music publishing company and their 2003 career retrospective. (In 2006 a German band also named Papas Fritas released a single called "Stehpisser," which is erroneously listed as part of the American band's discography in several online music stores.)

== History ==
Tony Goddess (guitar, vocals) and Shivika Asthana (drums, vocals) met in high school in Delaware before enrolling in Tufts University in Somerville, Massachusetts, where they met classmate Keith Gendel (bass, vocals). At first the band performed just for fun in and around the Tufts campus—their recording aspirations were limited to the self-distributed cassette-only releases "Careers for Culture Lovers" and "Retards/Cowboys" — but by 1994 they had recorded a proper seven-inch single for Sunday Driver Records (Friday Night) and agreed to promote it with a US tour. The song "Smash This World" received some radio play on college stations, prompting Chicago-based Minty Fresh to sign Papas Fritas, and in October 1995 they released their self-titled debut album.

The band spent the rest of the year and most of 1996 touring Europe and the United States with the Flaming Lips and the Cardigans, respectively. They released their second album, Helioself, in April 1997, kicking off another tour of home and abroad with the Cardigans once again, as well as Blur and Eels. (Matt O'Keefe, a roadie for Papas Fritas during their tours with the Cardigans and Blur in 1997, wrote a novel titled You Think You Hear, published in 2001, that is "LOOSELY based on our experiences on the road," according to the band's website. "If you decide to read it, remember that in reality, Papas Fritas are mentally stable and considerate individuals.") Donna Coppola (keyboards, percussion) and Chris Colthart (guitar) of the Solar Saturday (later the Faraway Places) joined Papas Fritas's touring lineup in the summer of 1999 and helped promote the band's third LP, Buildings and Grounds, which hit stores in March 2000.

After the tour ended, Asthana and Gendel went back to school, the former earning a master's degree in public health from Boston University in 2002, while the latter moved to Los Angeles to study at the Southern California Institute of Architecture. Goddess stuck with music, cowriting “Amsterdam” in 2003 for Guster, fellow alumni of Tufts University; working with Bleu on two tracks for the Boston power-pop singer's Electric Light Orchestra pastiche, Alpacas Orgling (2006); contributing a song to the Nickelodeon series Yo Gabba Gabba!; and producing and/or playing in the Rudds, the Silver Lining, Jenny Dee & the Deelinquents, and other Boston bands.

In May 2011 Asthana, Goddess, and Gendel reunited for festival appearances in Belgium, France, and Spain (with Samantha Wood Goddess, Tony's wife and Shivika's college roommate, on keyboards), plus two gigs in the Boston area. Four months later they taped a segment for Nick Jr.'s Yo Gabba Gabba!; the resulting episode aired on December 7, 2013, and featured the band performing a song called "Home."

== Discography ==
Albums

- Papas Fritas (1995)
- Helioself (1997)
- Buildings and Grounds (2000)
- Pop Has Freed Us (2003; compilation)

Singles

- "Friday Night" (1994; 7" format only)
- "Passion Play" (1995; released as both a 7" and an EP)
- "Wild Life" / "Afterall" (1995, Europe)
- "Hey Hey You Say" (1997)
- "Way You Walk" (2000, France)
- "Vertical Lives" (2000, Belgium)
- "Far From an Answer" (2000, Australia)

Self-distributed cassettes

- "Retards/Cowboys" (1993) includes the songs "Surgery"; "Through Her Arms"; "Here She Comes," officially released in 1995 by Double Agent Records on a four-band split seven-inch single; "Hey Sailor"; "Means," officially released in 1995 on Papas Fritas's Passion Play EP; and "Blueberries [a.k.a. Let's Have Sex]."
- "Careers for Culture Lovers" (1993) includes "Wild Life," rerecorded in 1995 for Papas Fritas; "Howl" and "Radio Days," officially released in 1995 on the Passion Play EP; "Mind Games"; "1989"; "Solid Gold"; and "I Hate My Friends."
- An untitled third cassette, also recorded in 1993, includes "Angel" and "Friday Night," officially released in 1994 on Papas Fritas's Friday Night single; "Smash This World," also featured on the Friday Night single and rerecorded in 1995 for Papas Fritas; "I'm Tired"; "She's a Member"; "Danger Bird"; "Hee-Haw"; and "Kanka."
