= Ruth Murray =

American dance teacher (1900–1991)

Ruth Lovell Murray (October 20, 1900 – September 5, 1991) was a pioneer in the field of dance education.

== Early life and education ==
Ruth L. Murray was born on October 20, 1900, in Detroit, Michigan. She attended Teachers College, Columbia University and graduated with a Bachelor of Science in 1925. She earned her master's degree from that university in 1933.

== Career ==
Murray served as a member of the faculty of Wayne State University for forty-six years. Her book, Dance in Elementary Education, was published in 1953 by Harper and Row. It is considered to be an important contribution to the field of dance education. Murray also served on numerous committees and received such awards as the Hetherington Award from the American Academy of Physical Education and the Arts Achievement Award from Wayne State and the Heritage Award (1969) from the National Dance Association. The Ruth Lovell Murray Endowed Scholarship in Dance was created in her name at Wayne State.
