= Shane Speal =

American musician

Shane Speal (born May 20, 1970) is an American musician, historian, and instrument builder who is best known for building and promoting cigar box guitars. He is the author of the D.I.Y. musical instrument book Making Poor Man's Guitars (2018, Fox Chapel Publishing) and is a writer for the magazine Guitar World.

Speal is the central figure in the Max Shores documentary, Songs Inside the Box, which spotlights the cigar box guitar resurgence.

== History ==
Speal built his first cigar box guitar on July 4, 1993. He used a cardboard Swisher Sweets cigar box and a plank of wood from his barn after reading an article about Carl Perkins' cigar box guitar in a 1976 issue of Guitar Player magazine. Speal said that his inspiration was to find an instrument that would give him music "deeper than the Delta blues".

In the next six years, Speal built over 200 more cigar box guitars under the brand Catfish Music Works, perfecting a crude poplar stick-thru-wood box design. He received endorsements from Warren Haynes and Allen Woody.

In addition to promoting the art of cigar box guitars online and supporting other players worldwide (such as Wesseh Freeman), Speal is a full-time musician who performs exclusively with cigar box guitars. He has released over 10 albums. Speal has been featured in Premier Guitar Magazine and Make Magazine.
