= Lowebow =

A lowebow is a variation of the cigar box guitar, created by John Lowe in the 1990s. It involves a cigar box with two wooden rods projecting from it. Each wooden rod typically holds one string: a bass string attached to one rod and a standard acoustic guitar string attached to the other. This allows the player to pluck a one-string bass and a one-string guitar at the same time. Each of the two strings has its own electric pickup that feeds into an amplifier. Some variations contain multiple strings on the treble neck, similar to standard cigar box guitars. There are many different models of Lowebow guitars available from John, but they are commonly now made with one bass string and three guitar strings. The lowebow was created with the one-man band in mind.

== Notable performers ==
- Johnny Lowebow
- Richard Johnston
- Reverend KM Williams
- Luther Dickinson, guitarist for the North Mississippi Allstars

== Similar instruments ==
- Diddley bow
- Cigar box guitar
- Slide guitar
- Washtub bass
