= Oranger =

American indie rock band

- Origin: San Francisco, California, California, U.S.
- Genres: Indie rock, psychedelic rock
- Years active: 1998–2006, 2020—present
- Labels: Poptones Records; Eenie Meenie Records; Amazing Grease Records; Pray for Mojo Records
- Members: Mike Drake; Patrick Main; Bob Reed
- Past members: Chad Dyer; Jim Lindsay; Matt Harris; John Hofer

Oranger was a San Francisco indie rock band.

== Band history ==
Mike Drake, Matt Harris, and Jim Lindsay knew each other from playing together in Overwhelming Colorfast and Stick Figures, previous bands. They formed Oranger in 1997 with Chad Dyer of American Sensei on bass, Mike Drake providing vocals and guitar, Jim Lindsay on drums, and Matt Harris playing lead guitar.

The four first performed at the Noise Pop Festival in San Francisco. Dyer soon left the band and Oranger established itself as a trio. After the success at the Noise Pop Festival, they recorded their first album Doorway to Norway. The album was recorded on a TASCAM 8-track cassette and released in 1998 on their own Pray for Mojo record label. In early 1999, Scott Kannberg of Pavement and Drake founded San Francisco indie label Amazing Grease Records and reissued Doorway to Norway as the label's first release.

In 1999, Patrick Main was added to the lineup and the band began recording their second album, The Quiet Vibrationland, taking its name from a lyric from The Who's rock opera Tommy". It was tracked on an Ampex MM1000 tape machine previously owned by The Beach Boys. Vibrationland was released in 2000. In 2003, Oranger released the double album Shutdown the Sun/From the Ashes of Electric Elves on San Francisco indie label Jackpine Social Club.

Lindsay left the group in 2004 and currently plays drums for The High Water Marks.

Oranger's last album, New Comes and Goes, was released in 2005 on Los Angeles indie Eenie Meenie Records. Also in 2005, the band's cover of the 1954 hit song "Mr. Sandman" was featured in the Xbox video game Stubbs the Zombie in "Rebel Without a Pulse" and in the television show "Vampire Diaries". In 2020, Oranger planned a reunion concert for April 12, 2020 at Bottom of the Hill in San Francisco. It was canceled due to the COVID-19 pandemic.

== Band members ==
=== Current members ===
- Mike Drake - vocals, guitar
- Bob Reed - guitar
- Patrick Main - keyboards

=== Former members ===
- Chad Dyer - bass
- Jim Lindsay - drums
- John Hofer - drums
- Matt Harris - bass, vocals (died 2021)

== Discography ==
- Doorway to Norway (1998)
- The Quiet Vibration Land (2000)
- Shutdown the Sun/From the Ashes of Electric Elves (2003)
- New Comes and Goes (2005)
- Please Leave Our Mind - Covers Under Lockdown (2021)
- Vege-tables (2021)
- Everyone Says You're Lots of Fun (2023)

=== Soundtracks ===
- Stubbs the Zombie: The Soundtrack (2005) song: "Mr. Sandman" (cover of The Chordettes)
