= Chris Kachulis =

- Born: 1937 (age 87–88); Brooklyn, New York, United States
- Genres: Electronic

Chris Kachulis (born 1937 in Brooklyn, New York), is a chanteur known for his participation in the early days of New York's Electronic music scene. He collaborated on Bruce Haack's 1970 album Electric Lucifer. Currently he performs alongside Frank Haines and Reuben Lorch-Miller in the cross-generational performance art trio Blanko & Noiry.
