= The Electric Lucifer =

Studio album by Bruce Haack
- Released: May 1970
- Recorded: 1968–1969
- Genres: Electronic, psychedelic rock
- Length: 38:15
- Label: Columbia
- Producer: Leroy Parkins

Bruce Haack chronology
The Electronic Record for Children (1969)	The Electric Lucifer (1970)	Together (1971)

Professional ratings
Review scores
Source	Rating
AllMusic	4.5/5 stars

The Electric Lucifer is an album by Bruce Haack combining acid rock and electronic sounds. AllMusic describes it as "a psychedelic, anti-war song cycle about the battle between heaven and hell." Haack used a Moog synthesizer and his own home-built electronics, including an early prototype vocoder. It was originally released on LP in 1970 and has been re-mastered and re-released on CD several times. The 2007 Omni Records CD release included a radio interview from 1970 and an alternate version of "Electric to Me Turn" as a bonus track. "Song of the Death Machine" and "Word Game" both feature vocals by Chris Kachulis. The lyrics mention concepts such as "powerlove" — a force so strong and good that it will not only save mankind but Lucifer himself.

== Track listing ==
All tracks composed by Bruce Haack

A Side
No.	Title	Length
1.	"Electric to Me Turn"	1:50
2.	"The Word (Narration)"	0:30
3.	"Cherubic Hymn"	2:20
4.	"Program Me"	4:39
5.	"War"	3:45
6.	"National Anthem to the Moon"	2:38
7.	"Chant of the Unborn"	1:22
Total length:		17:43

B Side
No.	Title	Length
1.	"Incantation"	3:15
2.	"Angel Child"	1:01
3.	"Word Game"	3:48
4.	"Song of the Death Machine"	3:00
5.	"Super Nova"	5:22
6.	"Requiem"	3:21
Total length:		20:32

== Personnel ==
- Bruce Haack - all instruments, vocals on ""Word Game", "Song of the Death Machine" and "Super Nova", narration on "The Word"
- Farad - vocals on "Electric to Me Turn", "Incantation" and "Word Game"
- Jon St. John - vocals on "Cherubic Hymn", "Program Me", "Song of the Death Machine" and "Requiem"
- Tony Taylor - vocals on Cherubic Hymn", "Program Me", "Angel Child", "Song of the Death Machine" and "Requiem"
- Chris Kachulis - vocals
- Gary Dersarkissian - child voice on "War"
- Arthur Kendy - stereo effects on "Super Nova"
- Andrew Kazdin - programming

Technical

- Arthur Kendy, Peter Granet, Ray Moore - engineer
- Isadore Seltzer - front cover artwork
