= Buildings and Grounds =

2000 studio album by Papas Fritas

Studio album by Papas Fritas
- Released: March 7, 2000
- Recorded: The Columnated Ruins, Gloucester, MA; The Backporch, Somerville, MA and The Krackhaus
- Genre: Indie rock, pop music
- Length: 48:20
- Label: Minty Fresh
- Producer: Papas Fritas

Papas Fritas chronology
| Helioself (1997) | Buildings and Grounds (2000) | Pop Has Freed Us (2003) |

Singles from Buildings and Grounds
- 1. "Way You Walk" Released: 2000; 2. "Vertical Lives" Released: 2000; 3. "Far From an Answer" Released: 2000

Professional ratings
Review scores
| Source | Rating |
|---|---|
| AllMusic | 4/5 stars |
| Robert Christgau | (dud) |
| The Encyclopedia of Popular Music | 3/5 stars |
| Spin | 5/10 |

Buildings and Grounds is the third and final studio album by Papas Fritas, released on Minty Fresh in 2000. In Australia it was distributed by local label Half a Cow, their first release of a non-Aussie album since Bettie Serveert's Palomine five years earlier.

== Critical reception ==
The Austin Chronicle wrote that "the arrangements are particularly grin-inducing, with their headphone-ready little tweaks and snippets of synthesized smarts and fleshy string flourishes." The Washington Post wrote that the band "doesn't overstate or over-embellish its material, relying on direct arrangements, bright tunes and the boy-girl vocal contrast between the band's two singers."

== Track listing ==
1. "Girl" (Tony Goddess) – 3:18
2. "People Say" (Goddess, Shivika Asthana) – 4:26
3. "Way You Walk" (Goddess) – 3:48
4. "Vertical Lives" (Keith Gendel) – 3:39
5. "What Am I Supposed to Do?" (Goddess) – 2:58
6. "Far From an Answer" (Asthana, Goddess) – 4:56
7. "I Believe in Fate" (Goddess) – 3:58
8. "It's Over Now" (Asthana, Goddess) – 4:15
9. "Questions" (Goddess) – 3:18
10. "Beside You" (Asthana, Goddess) – 3:23
11. "Another Day" (Goddess) – 3:03
12. "I'll Be Gone" (Asthana, Ed Buck) – 3:30
13. "Lost in a Dream" (Goddess) – 3:48

== Personnel ==
- Shivika Asthana: drums, vocals
- Keith Gendel: bass, vocals
- Tony Goddess: guitar, piano, vocals

== Production notes ==
Recorded at the Columnated Ruins (Gloucester, Mass.) and the Backporch and the Krackhaus (Somerville, Massachusetts). Engineered and mixed by Paul Sanni. Analog consultation by Paul Q. Kolderie. Mastered by Roger Siebel at SAE (Phoenix, Arizona).
