= Papas Fritas (album) =

1995 studio album by Papas Fritas

Studio album by Papas Fritas
- Released: October 10, 1995
- Genre: indie rock, pop music
- Length: 36:07
- Label: Minty Fresh
- Producer: Papas Fritas

Papas Fritas chronology
Papas Fritas (1995)	Helioself (1997)

Professional ratings
Review scores
Source	Rating
AllMusic	4/5 stars
Christgau's Consumer Guide	(neither)
CMJ	(favorable)
The Encyclopedia of Popular Music	3/5 stars
MusicHound Rock: The Essential Album Guide	3/5 stars

Papas Fritas is the debut album by Papas Fritas, released in 1995 on the Minty Fresh record label.

== Critical reception ==
Trouser Press editor Ira Robbins wrote that the group "...turns extraordinarily fetching pop concoctions like 'Lame to Be,' 'TV Movies,' 'Possibilities' and 'Smash This World' into disarmingly sophisticated and diverse small-scale charmers with abundant skill and no evidence of effort."

== Track listing ==
1. "Guys Don't Lie" (Shivika Asthana, Tony Goddess) – 2:39
2. "Holiday" (Goddess) – 2:49
3. "Wild Life" (Goddess) – 3:16
4. "Passion Play" (Goddess) – 3:04
5. "TV Movies" (Asthana, Goddess) – 3:58
6. "My Revolution" (Keith Gendel) – 2:45
7. "Kids Don't Mind" (Asthana, Gendel, Goddess) – 0:51
8. "Smash This World" (Goddess) – 2:49
9. "Lame to Be" (Asthana, Goddess) – 2:48
10. "Possibilities" (Asthana, Gendel, Goddess) – 2:21
11. "My Own Girlfriend" (Goddess) – 1:59
12. "Explain" (Goddess) – 3:41
13. "Afterall" (Goddess) – 3:07

== Personnel ==
- Shivika Asthana: drums, vocals
- Keith Gendel: bass, vocals
- Tony Goddess: guitar, piano, vocals

== Production notes ==
String arrangement on "Passion Play" by Tom Swafford (Swafford and Kathleen Derbyshire, violins; Heather Morehouse, viola; Sarah Thompson, cello). Engineered by Paul Sanni at Hi-Tech City (Somerville, Mass.). Mixed by Paul Q. Kolderie and Sean Slade at Fort Apache (Cambridge, Mass). Mastered by Roger Siebel at SAE (Phoenix, Ariz.). Photography by Anna Rappaport and Tim Leanse. Protection by Michael Hafitz. Thanks to Matt Hanks and Sunday Driver Records.
