= Eenie Meenie Records =

American independent record label

- Founded: 1999
- Founder: Reiko Kondo
- Location: United States

Eenie Meenie Records (stylized as eenie meenie records) is a Los Angeles–based independent record label.

== Information ==
Eenie Meenie Records was founded in 1999 by Reiko Kondo and specializes in signing indie pop, indie rock and electronica artists. Notably, the label has also released albums from side bands of The Apples in Stereo members; 010 by Ulysses (Robert Schneider) and Songs About the Ocean by The High Water Marks (Hilarie Sidney).

In 2005, a charity album entitled Dimension Mix was released as a tribute to electronic music pioneer Bruce Haack with the profits donated to Cure Autism Now.

== Artists ==
- Blue-Eyed Son
- Division Day
- DJ Me DJ You
- Faraway Places
- From Bubblegum to Sky
- Goldenboy
- Great Northern
- The High Water Marks
- Hockey Night
- Irving
- Old Monk
- Oranger
- Pine*AM
- Scissors for Lefty
- Seksu Roba
- Space Needle
- Troubled Hubble
- Ulysses
- Wallpaper

== See also ==
- List of record labels
