= Blue-Eyed Son =

American indie rock band

- Origin: Venice, California, United States
- Genres: Acoustic; Indie rock Surf rock
- Years active: 2004–present
- Labels: Eenie Meenie Records
- Members: Andrew Heilprin
- Website: blueeyedson.com

Blue-Eyed Son is an American indie rock band.

The title of their debut album West of Lincoln refers to the ocean west of Lincoln Boulevard, Santa Monica. "Blue-Eyed Son" may be a reference to a lyric in Bob Dylan's A Hard Rain's a-Gonna Fall, and the album features a cover of Dylan's "I Threw It All Away". The songs "When I Come Home" and "Step Away from the Cliff" have been featured on the medical drama Grey's Anatomy, and "Step Away from the Cliff" on the dark comedy Weeds. West of Lincoln has been described by Allmusic's Alex Henderson as a "softer, more acoustic guitar-friendly effort" than Heilprin's earlier work. Henderson goes on to say the album "has been greatly influenced by the Beatles' more psychedelic work of the late '60s."
