= Helioself =

1997 studio album by Papas Fritas

Studio album by Papas Fritas
- Released: April 22, 1997
- Genre: Indie rock
- Length: 35:01
- Label: Minty Fresh
- Producer: Papas Fritas

Papas Fritas chronology
Papas Fritas (1995)	Helioself (1997)	Buildings and Grounds (2000)

Professional ratings
Review scores
Source	Rating
AllMusic	4/5 stars
The Encyclopedia of Popular Music	3/5 stars
Entertainment Weekly	A−
MusicHound Rock: The Essential Album Guide	3.5/5 stars
NME	6/10
Uncut	4/5 stars

Helioself is the second album by Papas Fritas, released in 1997. According to the band's website, "Helioself is the name of the mythical Sun-Ra sessions that were so powerful ... they were sealed away in a lost vault by request of the Ra himself because the world was not ready for such harmonic energy."

Ivy covered Helioself's third track, "Say Goodbye," on their 2002 album Guestroom.

== Production ==
The album was recorded at frontman Tony Goddess's home studio, in Gloucester, Massachusetts.

== Critical reception ==
MusicHound Rock: The Essential Album Guide wrote that the album "catalogs a whole crateful of airy pop influences to create an organic, indie-pop masterpiece." Trouser Press wrote that "it flows like a well- programmed jukebox: unified by a rustic disposition, the album’s stylistic diversity feels comfortably natural, the songs instantly familiar without being selfconscious or specifically derivative." The Chicago Reader wrote that "the band's musical cataloging of its forebears can get annoying at times, but for the most part the sheer sunniness of the melodies diminishes these shortcomings."

== Track listing ==
All songs written by Papas Fritas (Shivika Asthana, Keith Gendel, and Tony Goddess).

1. "Hey Hey You Say" – 3:14
2. "We've Got All Night" – 3:04
3. "Say Goodbye" – 4:04
4. "Small Rooms" – 2:23
5. "Rolling in the Sand" – 1:48
6. "Live by the Water" – 2:45
7. "Words to Sing" – 2:48
8. "Sing About Me" – 2:28
9. "Just to See You" – 3:54
10. "Captain of the City" – 3:50
11. "Weight" – 1:49
12. "Starting to Be It" – 2:54

== Personnel ==
- Shivika Asthana: drums, vocals
- Keith Gendel: bass, vocals
- Tony Goddess: guitar, piano, vocals
- Shivika Asthana, Maria Le Rossow: tapping ("Weight")
- Bryan Hanna: additional percussion ("Hey Hey You Say," "Weight")

== Production notes ==
Engineered by Bryan Hanna at the Columnated Ruins (Gloucester, Mass.). Mixed by Paul Q. Kolderie and Sean Slade at Fort Apache (Cambridge, Mass). Mastered by Roger Siebel at SAE (Phoenix, Ariz.). Protection by Michael Hafitz. Direction by Peter Leak for the New York End Ltd. Special thanks to Jim Powers and Anthony Musiala.
