= Mike Snowden =

American musician and craftsman (born 1970)

- Born: January 1, 1970 (age 55)
- Occupations: Musician, craftsman
- Known for: Cigar box guitars
- Musical career
- Instruments: Guitar; bass; vocals
- Website: snowdenguitars.com

Mike Snowden (born January 1, 1970) is an American bassist, guitarist, singer-songwriter, and cigar box guitar craftsman. He is a leading figure in the resurgence of interest in cigar box guitars.

== Early life ==
Mike Snowden was born on January 1, 1970, in Lafayette, Louisiana and grew up in Natchitoches, Louisiana. He played bass in several bands as a teenager and was mentored by three older musicians—Donnie Hyams, Sammy Nix, and David Dollar—who expanded his musical horizons beyond heavy metal and recruited him to play bass with them when they performed in local bars. In 1989, shortly after graduating from high school, he moved to Atlanta, Georgia, to pursue a career in music.

== Band de Soleil ==
Following several false starts, Snowden was drafted to play bass in Band de Soleil with Michelle Malone (guitar, vocals) and Danny Begay (drums), and traveled with them extensively. He stayed with the group from 1992 until 1996, when they broke up.

== Cigar box guitars ==
After seeing a video on the internet of someone playing a cigar box guitar, Snowden was intrigued and built one for himself. In 2007, he began handcrafting three- and four-string cigar box guitars using exotic hardwoods and selling them at arts and crafts shows and from his website. In 2009, Snowden composed and recorded Summer in the Fields—Cigar Box Guitar Instrumentals, his first album of cigar box guitar music. He has since put out a number of additional records.

In the summer of 2012, Snowden was a headliner at the Boxstock Festival, an international meet of cigar box guitar players and enthusiasts in Manchester, England. He has also given children's workshops, where participants construct one-string guitars and learn to play them. He performs regularly in the greater Atlanta area.

Snowden has come to be known as a prominent figure in the cigar box guitar movement. His performance style blends elements of classic blues with rock, much of his music drawing on his Louisiana roots. In 2010, he has been a featured artist on the Cigar Box Guitars website and was profiled in Georgia Music: The Roots Issue. He has been featured on Georgia Public Broadcasting and FOX News in Atlanta, and was interviewed by television personality Brian McFayden on HLN and CNN. He was profiled by Charles Osgood on the CBS radio show The Osgood File and was the subject of an extensive article titled "The Cigar Box Guitar Maker" by award-winning writer and documentary film producer Nancy LeBrun, which appeared in the summer-2015 issue of the online magazine Craftsmanship. Snowden was also featured on the second episode ("Speed Demons") of the second season of A&E's Ozzy and Jack's World Detour, which first aired on November 15, 2017.

== Discography ==
Bass

- Redemption Dream (1995 – Band de Soleil)
- Mountain Stage Live 8 (1995 – Band de Soleil)
- Bird on Fire (1996 – Band de Soleil)
- Beneath the Devil Moon (1997)

Cigar box guitar

- Summer in the Fields—Cigar Box Guitar Instrumentals (2009)
- The Legend of Boondock Jones and His Faithful Cigar Box Guitar (2010)
- Cigar Box Guitar Stomp (2011)
- Cigar Box Guitar Evil (2012)
- One Man Cigar Box Guitar Band Live (2013)
- Mike Snowden Cigar Box Guitar Sampler (2014)
- Songs of the Architect Presents: A Very Sota Christmas, Vol. 1 (2014)
- This Is Our Town: A Collection of Natchitoches' Tri-Centennial Celebration Original Songs (2014)
- Southern Cigar Box Guitar Thunder (2017)
