= Athens, Georgia =

City in Georgia, United States

- Consolidated city–county
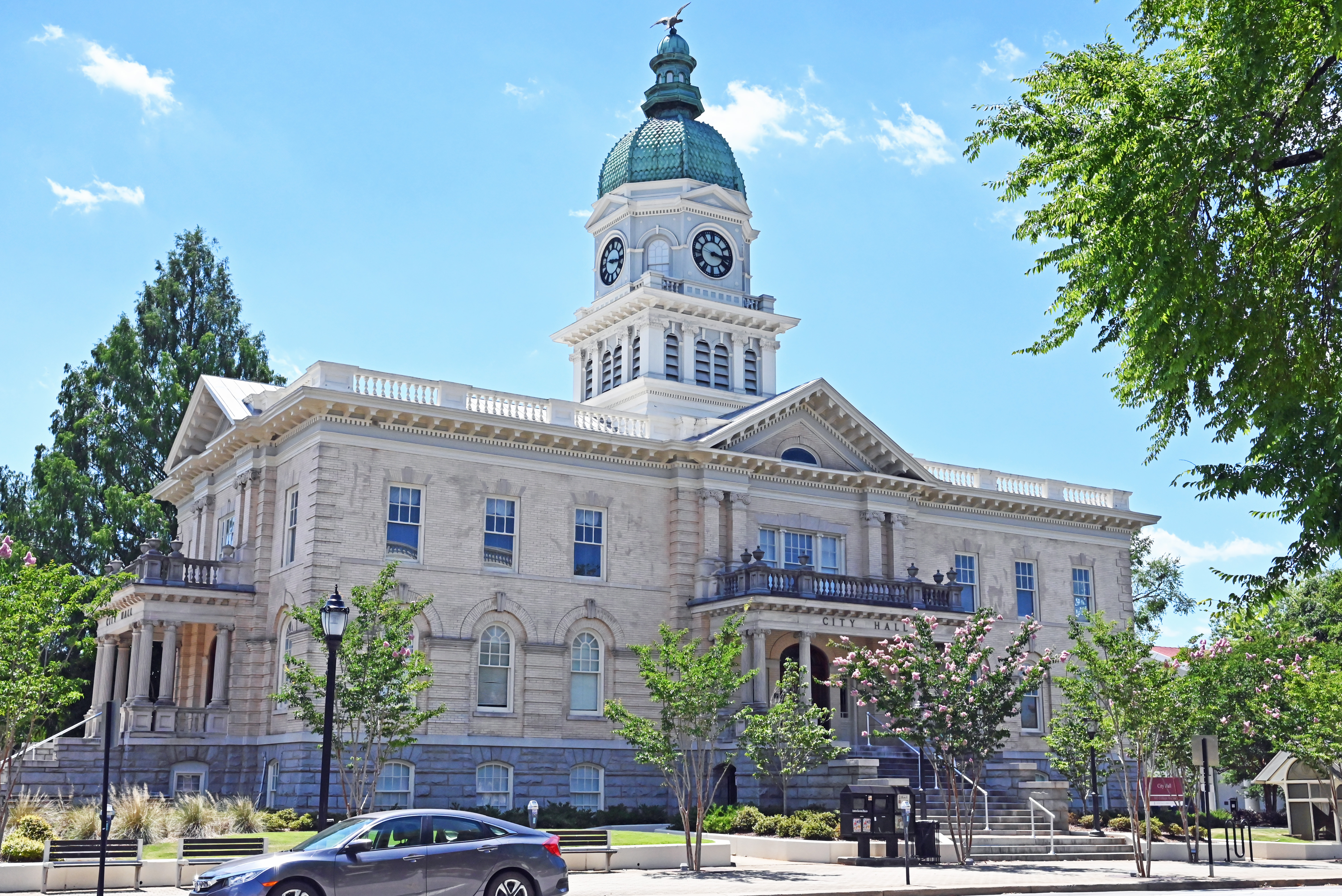
- Athens City Hall

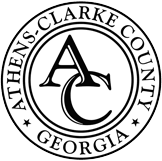
- Seal
- Nickname: "The Classic City"
- Location of Athens in Clarke County (left) and of Clarke County in Georgia (right)

- Location in Georgia Location in the United States
- Coordinates: 33°57′N 83°23′W
- Country: United States
- State: Georgia
- County: Clarke
- Settled: 1801
- As Town: December 1806
- As City: August 24, 1872
- Named for: Athens, Greece

Government
  - Mayor: Kelly Girtz

Area
  - Consolidated city–county: 118.10 sq mi (305.87 km^{2})
  - Land: 116.33 sq mi (301.29 km^{2})
  - Water: 1.77 sq mi (4.58 km^{2})
- Elevation: 636 ft (194 m)

Population (2020)
  - Consolidated city–county: 127,315
  - Rank: 218th in the United States; 6th in Georgia
  - Density: 1,094.5/sq mi (422.57/km^{2})
  - Metro: 215,415 (212th)
- Demonym: Athenian
- Time zone: UTC−5 (EST)
  - Summer (DST): UTC−4 (EDT)
- ZIP Codes: 30601–30609, 30612
- Area code: 706
- FIPS code: 13-03440
- Website: accgov.com

Athens is a consolidated city-county in the U.S. state of Georgia. Downtown Athens lies about 70 miles (110 km) northeast of downtown Atlanta. The University of Georgia, the state's flagship public university and an R1 research institution, is in Athens and contributed to its initial growth. In 1991, after a vote the preceding year, the original City of Athens abandoned its charter to form a unified government with Clarke County, referred to jointly as Athens–Clarke County, where it is the county seat.

As of 2021, the Athens-Clarke County's official website's population of the consolidated city-county (all of Clarke County except Winterville and a portion of Bogart) was 128,711. Athens is the sixth-most populous city in Georgia, and the principal city of the Athens metropolitan area, which had a 2020 population of 215,415, according to the U.S. Census Bureau. Metropolitan Athens is a component of the larger Atlanta–Athens–Clarke County–Sandy Springs Combined Statistical Area.

The city is a college town with a vibrant music scene centered in downtown Athens, next to the University of Georgia's North Campus. Major music acts associated with Athens include numerous alternative rock bands such as R.E.M., the B-52's, Widespread Panic, Drive-By Truckers, of Montreal, Neutral Milk Hotel, and Harvey Milk. The city is also known as a recording site for such groups as the Atlanta-based Indigo Girls. The 2020 book Cool Town: How Athens, Georgia, Launched Alternative Music and Changed American Culture describes Athens as the model of the indie culture of the 1980s. Athens has been named one of the best college towns in the US by Travel + Leisure, and one of the nation's most charming small towns by HGTV.

== History ==
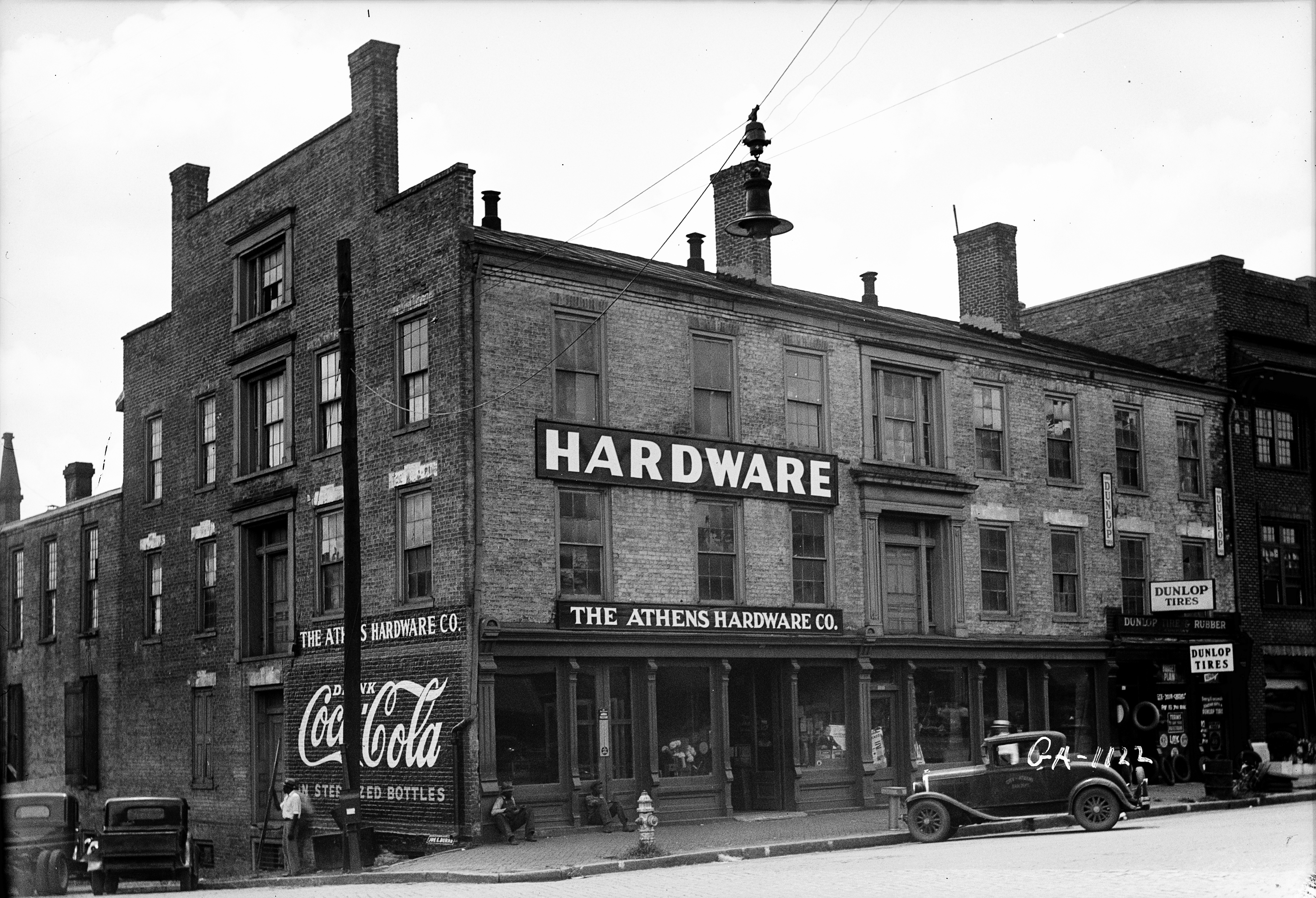
Historic American Buildings of Athens in 1936

In the late 18th century, a trading settlement on the banks of the Oconee River called Cedar Shoals stood where Athens is today. On January 27, 1785, the Georgia General Assembly granted a charter by Abraham Baldwin for the University of Georgia as the first state-supported university. Georgia's control of the area was established following the Oconee War. In 1801, a committee from the university's board of trustees selected a site for the university on a hill above Cedar Shoals, in what was then Jackson County. On July 25, 1801, John Milledge, one of the trustees and later governor of Georgia, bought 633 acres from Daniel Easley and donated it to the university. Milledge named the surrounding area Athens after the city that was home to the Platonic Academy of Plato and Aristotle in Classical Greece.

An aerial view of Athens, Georgia. Downtown Athens is at the bottom-right part of the photo. The University of Georgia is just beyond downtown. Athens–Ben Epps Airport is on the left seen between US 78 and the Athens Perimeter.

The first buildings on the University of Georgia campus were made from logs. The town grew as lots adjacent to the college were sold to raise money for the additional construction of the school. By the time the first class graduated from the university in 1804, Athens consisted of three homes, three stores, and a few other buildings facing Front Street, now known as Broad Street. Completed in 1806 and named in honor of Benjamin Franklin, Franklin College was the first permanent structure of the University of Georgia and the city of Athens. This brick building is now known as Old College.

Athens officially became a town in December 1806 with a government made up of a three-member commission. The university and town continued to grow with cotton mills fueling the industrial and commercial development. Athens became known as the "Manchester of the South" after the city in England known for its mills. In 1833, a group of Athens businessmen led by James Camak, tired of their wagons getting stuck in the mud, built one of Georgia's first railroads, the Georgia, connecting Athens to Augusta by 1841, and to Marthasville (now Atlanta) by 1845. In the 1830s and 1840s, transportation developments and the growing influence of the University of Georgia made Athens one of the state's most important cities as the Antebellum Period neared the height of its development. The university essentially created a chain reaction of growth in the community which developed on its doorstep.

During the American Civil War, Athens became a significant supply center when the New Orleans armory was relocated to what is now called the Chicopee building. Fortifications can still be found along parts of the North Oconee River between College Avenue and Oconee Street. In addition, Athens played a small part in the ill-fated "Stoneman Raid" when a skirmish was fought on a site overlooking the Middle Oconee River near what is now the old Macon Highway. A Confederate memorial that used to stand on Broad Street near the University of Georgia Arch was removed the week of August 10, 2020.

During Reconstruction, Athens continued to grow. The form of government changed to a mayor-council government with a new city charter on August 24, 1872, and Henry Beusse was elected as the first mayor of Athens. Beusse was instrumental in the city's rapid growth after the Civil War. After serving as mayor, he worked in the railroad industry and helped bring railroads to the region, creating growth in many of the surrounding communities. Freed slaves moved to the city, where many were attracted by the new centers for education such as the Freedmen's Bureau. This new population was served by three black newspapers: the Athens Blade, the Athens Clipper, and the Progressive Era.

In the 1880s, as Athens became more densely populated, city services and improvements were undertaken. The Athens Police Department was founded in 1881 and public schools opened in the fall of 1886. Telephone service was introduced in 1882 by the Bell Telephone Company. Transportation improvements were also introduced with a street paving program beginning in 1885 and streetcars, pulled by mules, in 1888.

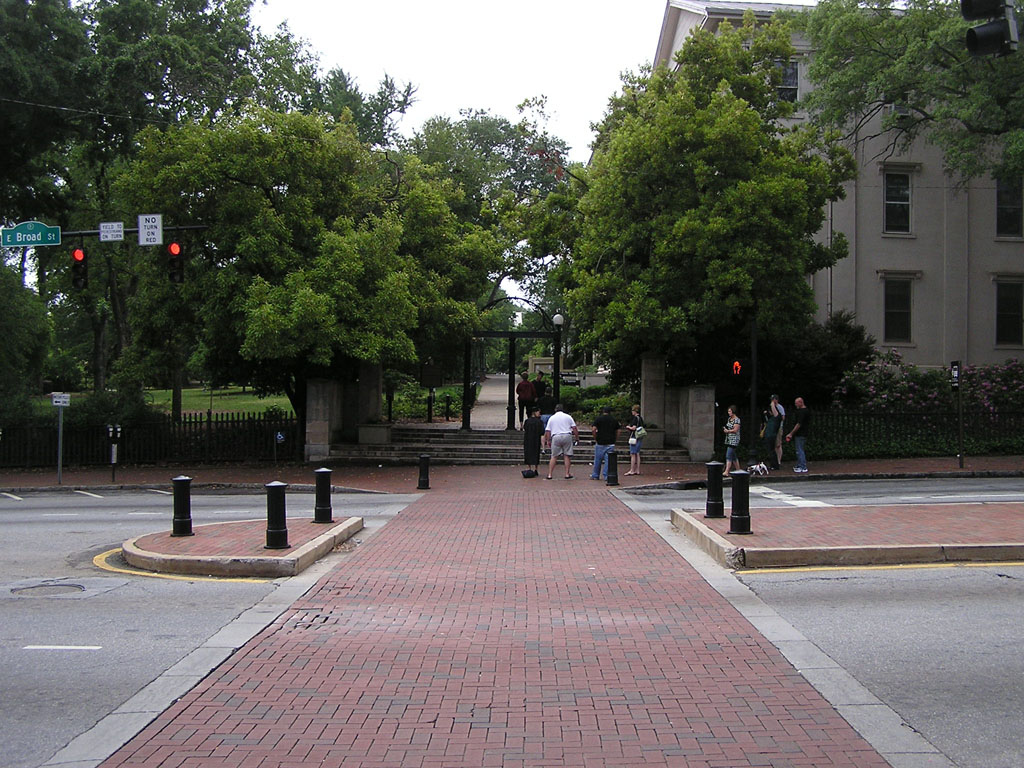
Broad Street in Downtown Athens at an entrance to North Campus of the University of Georgia

By the centennial in 1901, Athens had experienced a century of development and growth. A new city hall was completed in 1904. An African-American middle class and the professional class grew around the corner of Washington and Hull Streets, known as the "Hot Corner", where the Morton Building was constructed in 1910. The theater at the Morton Building hosted movies and performances by black musicians such as Louis Armstrong, Cab Calloway, and Duke Ellington. In 1907, aviation pioneer Ben T. Epps became Georgia's first pilot on a hill outside town that would become the Athens-Ben Epps Airport.

The last, and perhaps only, lynching in Athens occurred on February 16, 1921, when a mob of 3,000 people attacked the Athens courthouse and carried off John Lee Eberhart. Eberhart had been arrested for the murder of his employer, Ida D. Lee, with a shotgun in Oconee County. That night, he was driven back to the Lee farm where a mock trial was held. Though he refused to confess, he was tied to a stake and burned to death. The lynching received widespread attention.

During World War II, the U.S. Navy built new buildings and paved runways to serve as a training facility for naval pilots. In 1954, the U.S. Navy chose Athens as the site for the Navy Supply Corps school. The school was in Normaltown in the buildings of the old Normal School. It closed in 2011 under the Base Realignment and Closure process. The 56-acre site is now home to the Health Sciences Campus, which contains the University of Georgia/Medical College of Georgia Medical Partnership, the University of Georgia College of Public Health, and other health-related programs.

In 1961, Athens witnessed part of the civil rights movement when Charlayne Hunter and Hamilton Holmes became the first two black students to enter the University of Georgia. Despite the Brown vs. Board of Education Supreme Court ruling in 1954, the Athens–Clarke County school district remained segregated until 1964.

=== Timeline ===
Timeline of Athens, Georgia
- 1801
  - Franklin College opens.
  - Clarke County formed from part of Jackson County.
- 1806 – Town of Athens incorporated.
- 1808 – Georgia Express newspaper begins publication.
- 1810
  - Jackson Street Cemetery in use (approximate date).
  - Population: 273.
- 1832 – Southern Banner newspaper in publication.
- 1834 – Camak House and T. R. R. Cobb House built (approximate date).
- 1841 – Railroad begins operating.
- 1842 – Joseph Henry Lumpkin House built.
- 1850 – Population: 1,661.
- 1856
  - Oconee Hill Cemetery established.
  - Benjamin H. Hill House built.
- 1859 – Lumpkin Law School and Lucy Cobb Institute (girls school) established.
- 1870 – Population: 4,251.
- 1871 – Athens becomes seat of Clarke County.
- 1872
  - City of Athens incorporated.
  - State School of Agriculture and Mechanic Arts opens.
- 1882 – Gospel Pilgrim Cemetery established.
- 1883 – Synagogue built.
- 1891
  - Electric streetcar begins operating.
  - Ladies Garden Club organized.
- 1895 – State Normal School opens.
- 1896 – Electric lighting introduced.
- 1900 – Population: 10,245.
- 1903 – University of Georgia College of Pharmacy founded.
- 1904 – City Hall built.
- 1906 – School of Forestry founded.
- 1908 – Southern Mutual Insurance Company building constructed.
- 1910 – Morton Theatre in business.
- 1912 – School of Commerce founded.
- 1914
  - Reese Street School was founded.
  - Clarke County Courthouse built.
- 1917 – Athens Ben Epps Airport opens.
- 1921 – Lynching of John Lee Eberhart
- 1924 – Athens Country Club founded.
- 1928 – WTFI radio begins broadcasting.
- 1929 – University's Sanford Stadium opens.
- 1932 – University of Georgia begins administering previously separate colleges of agriculture, education, law, etc.
- 1938
  - WGAU radio begins broadcasting.
  - University of Georgia Press established.
- 1940 – Population: 20,650.
- 1948 – Georgia Museum of Art opens.
- 1949 – State Farmers Market established near Athens.
- 1954 – Prince Avenue Drive-In cinema in business.
- 1958 – Athens Area Vocational-Technical School founded.
- 1959 – Athens Historical Society organized.
- 1963 – Beechwood Shopping Center in business.
- 1965 – Daily News in publication.
- 1971 – Clarke Central High School opens.
- 1976
  - Athens Transit bus begins operating.
  - The B-52's musical group formed.
- 1977 – Georgia Theatre in business.
- 1979 – Pylon musical group begins performing.
- 1980
  - Georgia Square Mall in business.
  - R.E.M. musical group formed.
- 1987 – Athens-Clarke County Correctional Institution built.
- 1990 – Population: 45,734.
- 1991 – Governments of Athens and Clarke County consolidate.
- 1992 – Athens-Clarke County Library's Heritage Room (for local history) established.
- 1996 – Part of 1996 Summer Olympics takes place in Athens.
- 2000
  - City-county website online (approximate date).
  - Population: 100,266.
- 2001
  - Athens Institute for Contemporary Art founded.
  - Athens Banner-Herald newspaper in publication.
- 2007 – Paul Broun becomes U.S. representative for Georgia's 10th congressional district.
- 2010 – Population: 115,452.
- 2011 – Nancy Denson becomes mayor.
- 2015 – Jody Hice becomes U.S. representative for Georgia's 10th congressional district.
- 2019 – Kelly Girtz becomes mayor.

== Geography ==
According to the United States Census Bureau, the balance has a total area of 118.2 square miles (306.1 km^{2}), of which 117.8 square miles (305.1 km^{2}) is land and 0.5 square miles (1.3 km^{2}) (0.41%) is water.

Athens lies within the humid subtropical climate zone, with hot, humid summers and mild to moderately cold winters. Annual rainfall averages 49.7 inches (1,260 mm). Light to moderate sporadic snowfall occasionally can occur in winter. In the spring, sporadic thunderstorms can occasionally become severe, rarely producing tornadoes. The city sits on a series of hills, unique to the Piedmont region.

=== Climate ===
Athens has a humid subtropical climate. Its climatic regime is typical of that of the Southeastern United States, with hot summers transitioning into cool winters, with precipitation consistently high throughout the year. Normal monthly temperatures range from 43.5 °F (6.4 °C) in January to 80.6 °F (27.0 °C) in July; on average, maxima reach 90 °F (32 °C) or higher and stay below 40 °F (4 °C) on 58 and 5.8 days annually, and there are 48 days annually with a minimum at or below freezing.

Official record temperatures range from −4 °F (−20 °C) on January 21, 1985 to 109 °F (43 °C) on June 29, 2012; the record cold daily maximum is 18 °F (−8 °C) on January 30, 1966, while, conversely, the record warm daily minimum is 79 °F (26 °C) as recently as August 11, 2007. Temperatures rarely fall below 10 °F (−12 °C), having last occurred January 7, 2014. The average window for freezing temperatures is November 5 to March 24, allowing a growing season of 225 days.

Precipitation is relatively well spread (though the summer months are slightly wetter), and averages 46.3 inches (1,180 mm) annually, but has historically ranged from 28.61 in (727 mm) in 1954 to 71.39 in (1,813 mm) in 1964. Snowfall is sporadic, averaging 2.9 inches (7.4 cm) per winter, but has reached 13.6 inches (34.5 cm) in 2010–2011.

Climate data for Athens, Georgia (Ben Epps Airport), 1991–2020 normals, extremes 1893–present
| Month | Jan | Feb | Mar | Apr | May | Jun | Jul | Aug | Sep | Oct | Nov | Dec | Year |
|---|---|---|---|---|---|---|---|---|---|---|---|---|---|
| Record high °F (°C) | 80 (27) | 83 (28) | 89 (32) | 97 (36) | 100 (38) | 109 (43) | 108 (42) | 107 (42) | 108 (42) | 100 (38) | 86 (30) | 80 (27) | 109 (43) |
| Mean maximum °F (°C) | 71 (22) | 75 (24) | 82 (28) | 86 (30) | 92 (33) | 96 (36) | 98 (37) | 98 (37) | 93 (34) | 86 (30) | 79 (26) | 72 (22) | 100 (38) |
| Mean daily maximum °F (°C) | 54.7 (12.6) | 58.9 (14.9) | 66.8 (19.3) | 74.8 (23.8) | 82.3 (27.9) | 88.9 (31.6) | 92.0 (33.3) | 90.4 (32.4) | 84.6 (29.2) | 75.1 (23.9) | 64.9 (18.3) | 56.8 (13.8) | 74.2 (23.4) |
| Daily mean °F (°C) | 44.3 (6.8) | 47.9 (8.8) | 54.9 (12.7) | 62.3 (16.8) | 70.5 (21.4) | 77.7 (25.4) | 81.0 (27.2) | 79.8 (26.6) | 73.9 (23.3) | 63.5 (17.5) | 53.3 (11.8) | 46.5 (8.1) | 63.0 (17.2) |
| Mean daily minimum °F (°C) | 33.8 (1.0) | 36.9 (2.7) | 42.9 (6.1) | 49.8 (9.9) | 58.6 (14.8) | 66.5 (19.2) | 70.0 (21.1) | 69.2 (20.7) | 63.3 (17.4) | 51.9 (11.1) | 41.6 (5.3) | 36.3 (2.4) | 51.7 (10.9) |
| Mean minimum °F (°C) | 17 (−8) | 22 (−6) | 27 (−3) | 35 (2) | 45 (7) | 57 (14) | 63 (17) | 62 (17) | 51 (11) | 36 (2) | 27 (−3) | 22 (−6) | 15 (−9) |
| Record low °F (°C) | −4 (−20) | 3 (−16) | 11 (−12) | 26 (−3) | 37 (3) | 45 (7) | 55 (13) | 53 (12) | 30 (−1) | 24 (−4) | 7 (−14) | 2 (−17) | −4 (−20) |
| Average precipitation inches (mm) | 4.36 (111) | 4.36 (111) | 4.37 (111) | 3.52 (89) | 3.28 (83) | 4.88 (124) | 4.20 (107) | 4.55 (116) | 3.89 (99) | 3.34 (85) | 3.77 (96) | 4.43 (113) | 48.95 (1,243) |
| Average snowfall inches (cm) | 1.4 (3.6) | 0.6 (1.5) | 0.8 (2.0) | 0.0 (0.0) | 0.0 (0.0) | 0.0 (0.0) | 0.0 (0.0) | 0.0 (0.0) | 0.0 (0.0) | 0.0 (0.0) | 0.0 (0.0) | 0.1 (0.25) | 2.9 (7.4) |
| Average precipitation days (≥ 0.01 in) | 10.6 | 10.1 | 9.6 | 8.5 | 8.9 | 11.4 | 10.6 | 9.6 | 7.4 | 6.6 | 8.4 | 10.4 | 112.1 |
| Average snowy days (≥ 0.1 in) | 0.8 | 0.4 | 0.2 | 0.0 | 0.0 | 0.0 | 0.0 | 0.0 | 0.0 | 0.0 | 0.0 | 0.3 | 1.7 |
| Average relative humidity (%) | 69 | 65 | 64 | 63 | 69 | 72 | 74 | 76 | 75 | 73 | 71 | 70 | 70 |
| Percentage possible sunshine | 49 | 54 | 58 | 66 | 68 | 67 | 63 | 75 | 64 | 63 | 58 | 50 | 61 |
Source: NOAA (humidity and snow 1981–2010)

== Demographics ==
Historical population
| Census | Pop. | Note | %± |
|---|---|---|---|
| 1810 | 273 | | — |
| 1850 | 1,661 | | — |
| 1860 | 3,848 | | 131.7% |
| 1870 | 4,251 | | 10.5% |
| 1880 | 6,099 | | 43.5% |
| 1890 | 8,639 | | 41.6% |
| 1900 | 10,245 | | 18.6% |
| 1910 | 14,913 | | 45.6% |
| 1920 | 16,748 | | 12.3% |
| 1930 | 18,192 | | 8.6% |
| 1940 | 20,650 | | 13.5% |
| 1950 | 28,180 | | 36.5% |
| 1960 | 31,355 | | 11.3% |
| 1970 | 44,342 | | 41.4% |
| 1980 | 42,549 | | −4.0% |
| 1990 | 45,734 | | 7.5% |
| 2000 | 100,266 | | 119.2% |
| 2010 | 115,452 | | 15.1% |
| 2020 | 127,315 | | 10.3% |
| 2025 (est.) | 128,612 | ▲ | 1.0% |
U.S. Decennial Census; 1850-1870 1870-1880; 1890-1910 1920-1930; 1940 1950 1960; 1970 1980 1990; 2000 2010 2020; 2025

Athens-Clarke County unified government, Georgia – Racial and ethnic composition Note: the US Census treats Hispanic/Latino as an ethnic category. This table excludes Latinos from the racial categories and assigns them to a separate category. Hispanics/Latinos may be of any race.
| Race / Ethnicity (NH = Non-Hispanic) | Pop 2000 | Pop 2010 | Pop 2020 | % 2000 | % 2010 | % 2020 |
|---|---|---|---|---|---|---|
| White alone (NH) | 61,950 | 65,747 | 71,258 | 61.79% | 56.95% | 55.97% |
| Black or African American alone (NH) | 27,284 | 30,441 | 31,129 | 27.21% | 26.37% | 24.45% |
| Native American or Alaska Native alone (NH) | 160 | 138 | 297 | 0.16% | 0.12% | 0.23% |
| Asian alone (NH) | 3,147 | 4,807 | 4,894 | 3.14% | 4.16% | 3.84% |
| Pacific Islander alone (NH) | 41 | 48 | 65 | 0.04% | 0.04% | 0.05% |
| Some Other Race alone (NH) | 167 | 270 | 976 | 0.17% | 0.23% | 0.77% |
| Mixed Race or Multi-Racial (NH) | 1,115 | 1,872 | 4,452 | 1.11% | 1.62% | 3.50% |
| Hispanic or Latino (any race) | 6,402 | 12,129 | 14,244 | 6.39% | 10.51% | 11.19% |
| Total | 100,266 | 115,452 | 127,315 | 100.00% | 100.00% | 100.00% |

As of the 2020 United States census, there were 127,315 people, 51,640 households, and 23,615 families residing in the city. As of the census of 2010, there were 100,266 people, 39,239 households, and 19,344 families residing in the city. The population density was 851.5 inhabitants per square mile (328.8/km^{2}). There were 41,633 housing units at an average density of 353.6 units per square mile (136.5 units/km^{2}). The racial makeup of the city was 64.71% White, 27.37% Black or African American, 0.21% Native American, 3.15% Asian, 0.04% Pacific Islander, 3.11% from other races, and 1.41% from two or more races. Hispanic or Latino of any race were 6.39% of the population.

The large population increase from 1990 to 2000 reflects the city's expanded boundaries that came with the consolidation of Athens and Clarke County, and not merely an influx of new residents. Since that time the population has increased an average of 12.7% every ten years.

There were 39,239 households, of which 22.3% had children under 18 living with them, 32.3% were married couples living together, 13.3% had a female householder with no husband present, and 50.7% were non-families. 29.9% of all households were made up of individuals, and 5.8% had someone living alone who was 65 years of age or older. The average household size was 2.35 and the average family size was 2.95.

In the city, 17.8% of the population was under the age of 18, 31.6% was from 18 to 24, 27.3% from 25 to 44, 15.3% from 45 to 64, and 8.0% was 65 years of age or older. The median age was 25 years. For every 100 females, there were 95.4 males. For every 100 females age 18 and over, there were 93.4 males.

The median income for a household in the city was $28,118, and the median income for a family was $41,407. Males had a median income of $30,359 versus $23,039 for females. The per capita income for the balance was $17,103. About 15.0% of families and 28.6% of the population were below the poverty line, including 25.2% of those under age 18 and 13.5% of those age 65 or over.

== Government ==
In 1990, the City of Athens and Clarke County voters voted to unify their governments, becoming only the second unified government in Georgia and the 28th nationwide.

- Legislative: The government is headed by an elected mayor and 10 elected commissioners from 10 equally divided districts. Previously, they have been formed from 8 geographical districts and two super-districts covering districts 1–4 and 5–8
- Executive: The Unified Government of Athens-Clarke County's day-to-day operations is overseen by a manager appointed by the Mayor and Commission. There are 24 main departments, divisions, and offices under the managerial group.
- Judicial: Athens-Clarke County houses Magistrate, Juvenile, Municipal, Probate, State, and Superior Courts. Superior Court covers the Western Judicial Circuit, which also includes Oconee County.

== Law ==
Athens-Clarke County Police Department
- Abbreviation: ACCPD

Agency overview
- Formed: January 14, 1991

Jurisdictional structure
- General nature: Local civilian police

Operational structure
- Headquarters: 3035 Lexington Rd. Athens, Georgia 30605
- Sworns: 244 (~210 working strength)
- Civilians: 73
- Agency executive: Jerry Saulters, Chief of Police

Facilities
- Number of Stations: 5
- Holding Facilities: Clarke County Jail - Clarke County Sheriff's Office
- Vehicles: Chevrolet Impala, Ford Interceptor, Ford Explorer, Ford F-150, Ford Fusion, Toyota Prius

Website
- http://www.accpd.org

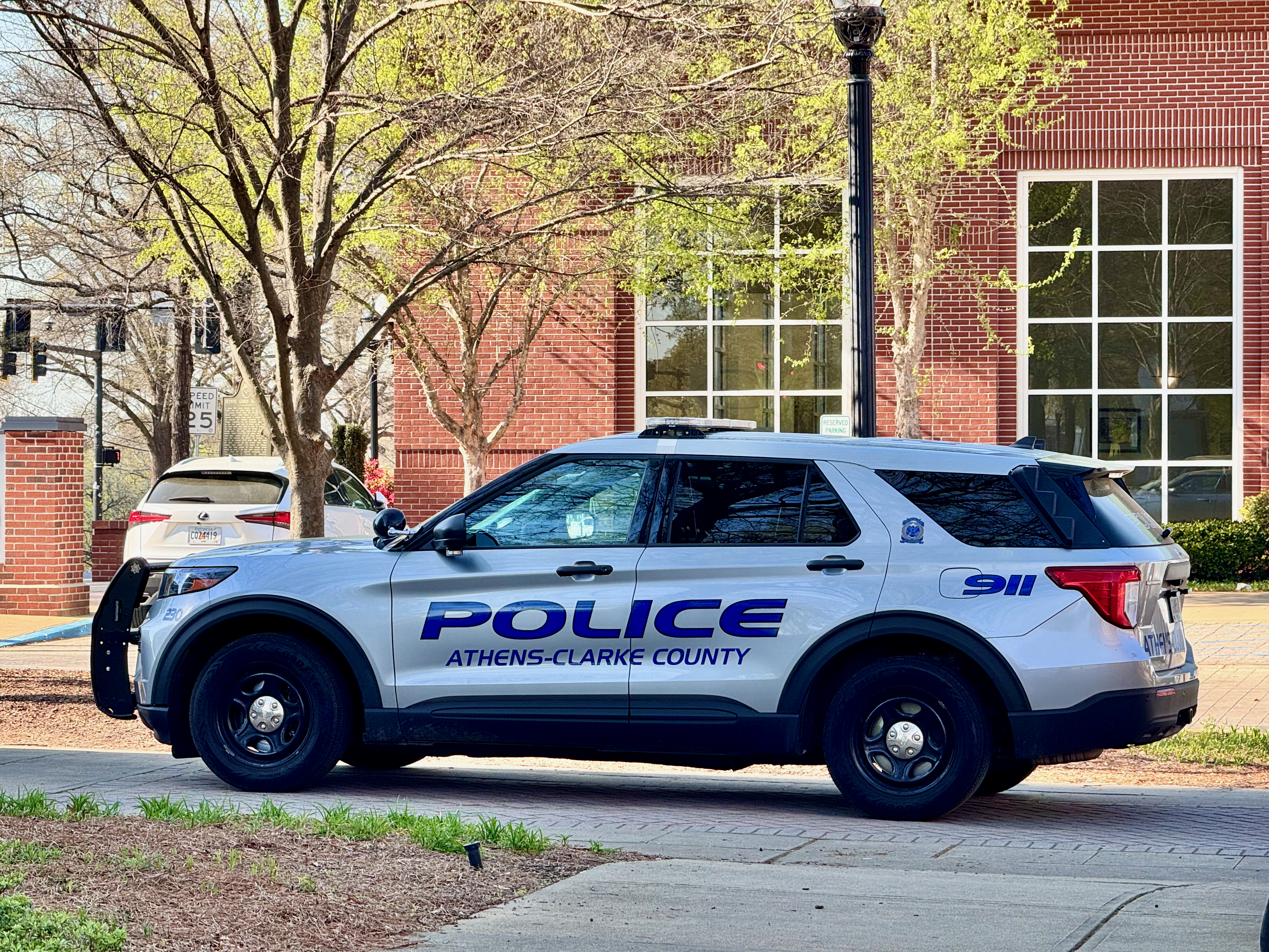
Athens-Clarke County police SUV

The Athens-Clarke County Police Department (ACCPD) was formed by the merger of the law enforcement agencies of the City of Athens and Clarke County. As of October 2022, Jerry Saulters was sworn in as the new Chief of Police. ACCPD is accredited by the Commission on Accreditation for Law Enforcement Agencies (CALEA) and was named a "Gold Standard Agency" in 2013. ACCPD's 911 Communications Center is also CALEA certified and has reached "Gold Standard" status. ACCPD is also the first law enforcement agency certified by the State of Georgia.

== Economy ==
=== Businesses ===
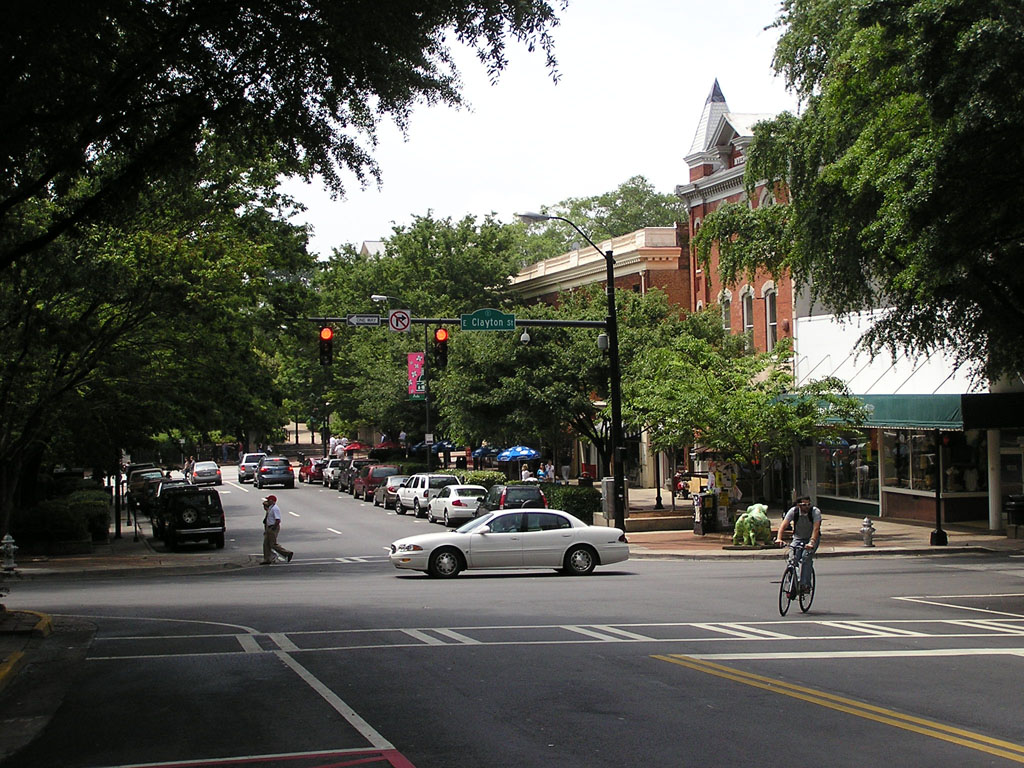
Downtown Athens at the intersection of Clayton Street and College Avenue

Athens is home to a growing number of young technology companies including Docebo, Roundsphere, and Cogent Education. The city is also home to more established technology companies such as Partner Software, Peachtree Medical Billing, and Digital Insight.

Athens is home to several pharmaceutical manufacturing and biotechnology companies such as Boehringer-Ingelheim and Janssen Pharmaceuticals, Inc. The University of Georgia also hosts its own biotechnology research centers mostly from the lower east side of town bordering Oconee county. In May 2020, RWDC Industries, a company that develops alternatives to single-use plastics, announced its plan to invest $260 million into the city and the surrounding area and acquire an existing 400,000-square-foot facility.

Independent publisher Hill Street Press is headquartered here. Authors with previous, or current, residence in the city include Pulitzer Prize winners Deborah Blum and Edward Larson, as well as Judith Ortiz Cofer, Reginald McKnight, Coleman Barks, and Jon Jefferson.

Athens' music industry has also continued to grow as Tweed Recording acquired an 11,000-square-foot facility in downtown Athens to house their new recording studio, academy, and community space.

=== Tourism ===
Each spring, there are bicycle races collectively known as the Twilight Series. One of these races is the Athens Twilight Criterium.

=== Competitiveness ===
In 2010, the average household rent in Athens was $962. The national average was $1,087. Of the Athens population 25 years of age or older, 39.3% have earned a bachelor's degree or higher.

== Arts and culture ==
The Georgia Museum of Art at the University of Georgia has been, since 1982, the official state art museum. Culture coexists with the university students in creating an art scene, music scene, and intellectual environment. The city has music venues, restaurants, bars, and coffee shops that cater to its creative climate.

=== Points of interest ===
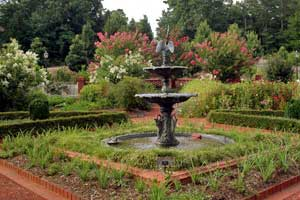
Formal garden at the State Botanical Garden of Georgia at the University of Georgia

- One of the remaining two double-barreled cannons produced during the American Civil War is located in Athens.
- The "Tree That Owns Itself", which is now an offspring of the original tree, is at the corner of South Finley and Dearing Streets; between 1820 and 1832 the property owner deeded to it the ownership of itself and its surrounding land.
- The Georgia Museum of Art, the official state museum of art, at the University of Georgia
- The State Botanical Garden of Georgia at the University of Georgia
- The University of Georgia Campus & Arboretum
- St. Mary's Church steeple, all that remains of the site of the first show by what became R.E.M.
- The Globe bar was voted by Esquire magazine as the bar ranked third highest in America in 2007
- Founded in 1955, Allen's was Athens' oldest bar and grill despite closing in 2004, re-opening in 2007, and closing again in November 2011
- Sandy Creek Park is a 782-acre park that surrounds 260-acre Lake Chapman and includes a beach and swimming area with over 28,000 square feet of sand, kayaks, canoes, hiking, boat ramp, fishing, picnic tables, grills, accessible playgrounds, dog park, and other amenities.
- Memorial Park

=== Music ===
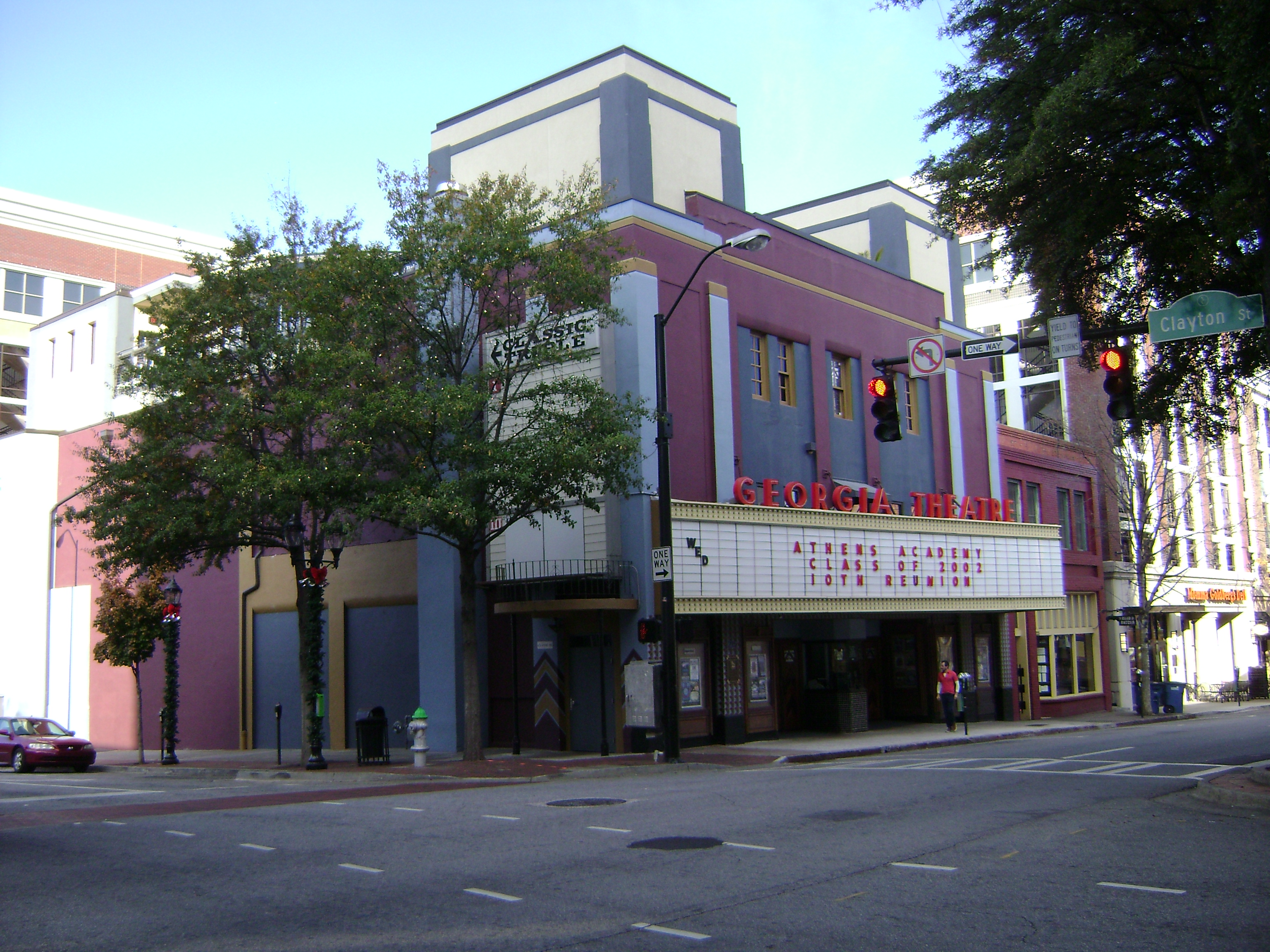
Georgia Theatre

The music of Athens, Georgia, includes a wide variety of popular music and was an important part of the early evolution of alternative rock and new wave. The city is well known as the home of chart-topping bands like R.E.M. and The B-52s, and several long-time indie rock hip-hop groups. The Athens music scene grew in the early 1970s and later during the 1980s with the Georgia Theatre and 40 Watt Club as the aforementioned bands scored breakout hits. Other notable bands were Widespread Panic, Dreams So Real, Indigo Girls, Vigilantes of Love, Matthew Sweet, The Method Actors, Love Tractor, Pylon, Flat Duo Jets, The Primates, Modern Skirts, The Whigs, Squalls, Drive-by Truckers, Futurebirds, Bloodkin, Randall Bramblett, Vic Chesnutt, Tishamingo, Bubba Sparxxx, Dead Confederate, Corey Smith, and Humble Plum. In his insider book, Party Out of Bounds: The B-52's, R.E.M., and the Kids Who Rocked Athens, Rodger Lyle Brown described the indie rock scene in Athens.

National acts that have come out of Athens include: The Whigs, Reptar, Danger Mouse, Dreams So Real, Nana Grizol, Jucifer, Servotron, Vic Chesnutt, Drive-By Truckers, Elf Power, Neutral Milk Hotel, Lera Lynn, The Sunshine Fix, Colt Ford, Brantley Gilbert, Harvey Milk, The Olivia Tremor Control, of Montreal, Widespread Panic, Perpetual Groove, Five Eight, Dead Confederate, Thayer Sarrano, Jet by Day, Mothers, and Humble Plum. R.E.M. members Michael Stipe, Mike Mills and Peter Buck still maintain residences in Athens. The photo book Athens Potluck, by Jason Thrasher, documents the town's musical legacy.

In September 2020, the city launched the Athens Music Walk of Fame. The public art walk spans a two-city blocks loop around West Washington and Clayton Streets connected by North Lumpkin Street. Guitar pick plaques were laid on the sidewalk in front of significant music venues like the Georgia Theatre, the 40 Watt Club, and the Morton Theatre. The first round of inductees included The B-52s, Danger Mouse, Drive-By Truckers, The Elephant 6 Recording Company, Hall Johnson, Neal Pattman, Pylon, R.E.M., Vic Chesnutt, and Widespread Panic.

=== Athfest ===
AthFest is a free annual music and arts festival, first held in 1997. The festival spans three days in the downtown area during the summer, and planning for the event begins in November. The first Athens Music Festival (Athfest) was organized by the Athens Convention and Visitors Bureau (ACVB) and the Athens Downtown Development Authority (ADDA). Jared Bailey was hired to manage the event. In 2009, AthFest became the 501(c)3 non-profit AthFest Educates, which seeks to advance high-quality music and arts education for local youth and the Athens community through direct support of school and community-based programs and events, including an annual music and arts festival. In 2010, AthFest Educates started the annual AthHalf Half Marathon as an additional fundraiser.

The 2020 event, the 24th year of the festival, had been deferred to 2021 due to the COVID-19 pandemic, making it the first time in 23 years that the festival was cancelled. However, in September 2021, the festival was cancelled again for the second year in a row due to continuing concerns of public health from the pandemic.

== Education ==
=== Clarke County School District ===
The Clarke County School District supports grades pre-school to grade twelve. The district consists of fourteen elementary schools, four middle schools, and three high schools (one non-traditional). The district has 791 full-time teachers and 11,457 students as of 2010.

=== Private schools ===
- Athens Academy (grades K-12)
- Athens Christian School (grades K-12)
- Athens Montessori School (grades K-8)
- Downtown Academy (grades K-3)
- Joy Village School (grades K-8)
- Saint Joseph Catholic School (grades Pre-K-6)
- Donovan Catholic High School (grades 7–12)
- Double Helix STEAM School (grades 5–8)
- Al Huda Islamic Center of Athens Sunday School (5 years and older)

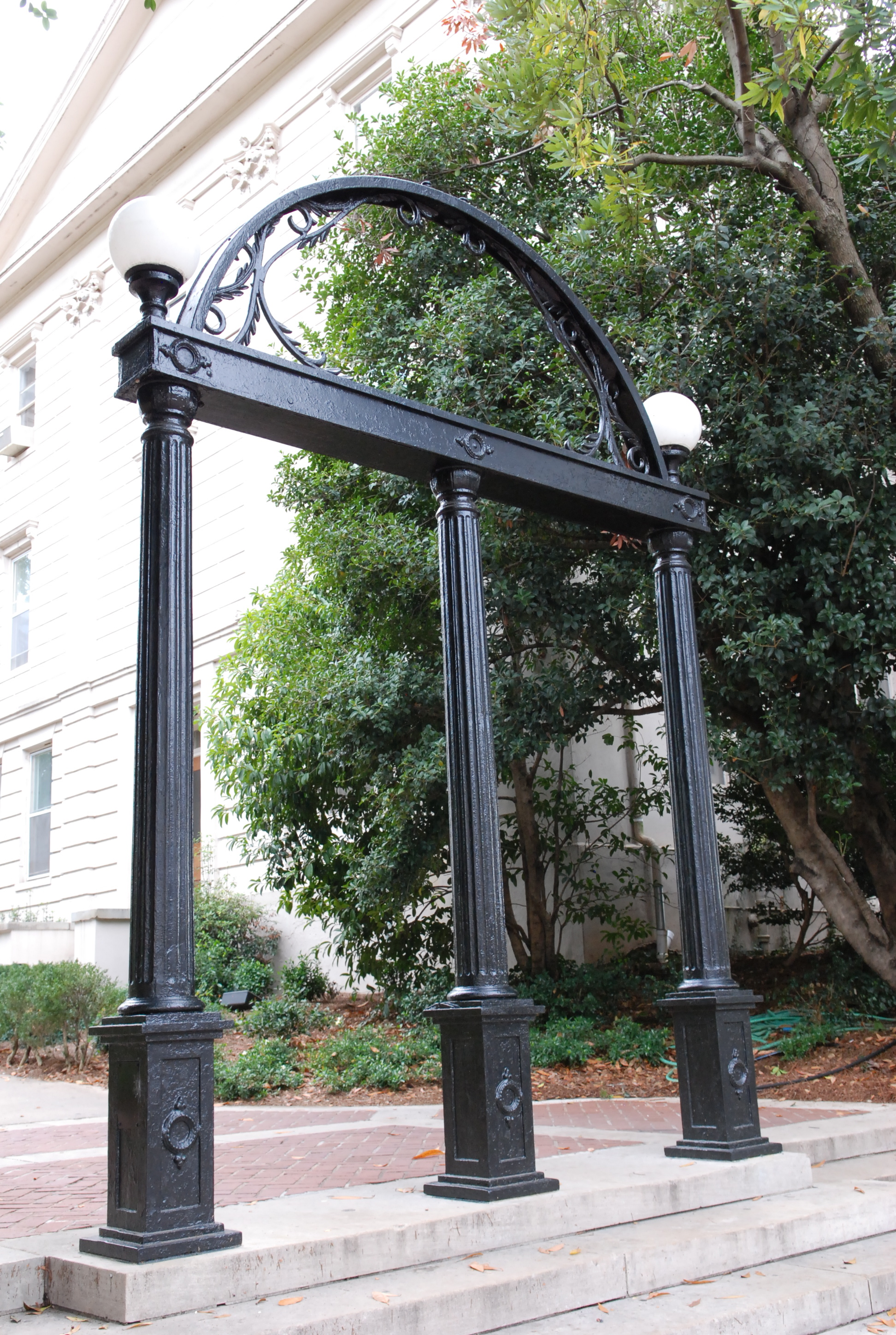
The Arch at an entrance to North Campus of the University of Georgia in Downtown Athens

=== Colleges and universities ===
- The University of Georgia (UGA), an R1 Doctoral University with very high research activity, is the state's flagship research university, the oldest institution of higher learning in Georgia and, founded in 1785, it is the first state-chartered university in the United States.
- Athens Technical College is a Technical College System of Georgia public college. It offers certificates, diplomas, and associate degrees in business, health, technical, and manufacturing-related fields.
- Augusta University (AU) through its Medical College of Georgia has a Medical Partnership with the University of Georgia housed at the University of Georgia Health Science Campus, and the AU College of Nursing has had a campus in Athens since 1974.
- Piedmont University, a private liberal arts institution, established a campus in Athens in 1995 that now is on Prince Avenue in the Normaltown neighborhood.
- College of Athens (CoA) is a private Christian college that was established in 2012. CoA currently offers certificates, undergraduate, and graduate degrees in nine various major areas.

== Media ==
=== Newspapers ===
The Athens Banner-Herald publishes daily. UGA has an independent weekly newspaper, The Red & Black. Flagpole Magazine is an alternative newspaper publishing weekly. Classic City News is a not-for-profit local news source.

=== Radio and television ===
Local radio stations include:

- WPLP-LP Bulldog 93.3 FM is Athens' locally owned and operated adult album alternative station
- WPUP 100.1 FM, Athens top 40 station featuring all of today's hits. Owned by Cox Radio
- WMSL 88.9 FM, a religious station featuring traditional Christian music and teaching
- WUOG 90.5 FM, UGA's student-run radio station
- WUGA 91.7 and 94.5 FM, an affiliate of Georgia Public Broadcasting and National Public Radio also broadcasting from the UGA campus
- WPPP-LP 100.7 FM (Hot 100), a low-power, non-commercial alternative/progressive rock station
- WRFC (AM) 960 AM, ESPN Radio (formerly Athens' local Top 40 music station during the 1960s and 1970s). Owned by Cox Radio.
- WGAU 1340 AM, news and talk. Owned by Cox Radio.
- WXAG 1470 AM, urban gospel music

Athens is part of the Atlanta television market. Two Atlanta-market television stations, WGTV (channel 8) and WUVG (channel 34), are licensed to Athens, though their transmitters are in the Atlanta metropolitan area. WGTV broadcasts from the top of Stone Mountain. From 2009 until 2015, UGA operated a television station, WUGA-TV (formerly WNEG-TV) from studios on the UGA campus, but maintained its transmitter near Toccoa, its city of license; what is now WGTA has since moved its studios back to Toccoa after being sold by UGA.

Amateur radio has a long history in Athens. The Athens Radio Club 2-meter repeater operates on 145.330 MHz with a (-) offset and a PL tone of 123.0/123.0. Its antenna is located at 390’ AGL on a tower in the northern part of the city. The Athens Radio Club is affiliated with the American Radio Relay League and sponsors four community events each year.

== In popular culture ==
The 1940 film The Green Hand was shot in Athens, using local townspeople and students and faculty from the University of Georgia as its cast. The film had its premiere in Athens in January 1940, at an event attended by Governor Eurith D. Rivers.

The 1980 TV series Breaking Away was filmed in Athens.

The movie Darius Goes West was shot in Athens.

In 2000, the fictional Ithaca University scenes in Road Trip were filmed on the North Campus of the University of Georgia.

In 2012, Trouble with the Curve was partially filmed at The Globe in downtown Athens. In the same year, The Spectacular Now was filmed entirely in Athens and the surrounding area.

== Infrastructure ==
=== Transportation ===
==== Highways ====
The city is the focus of U.S. Highways U.S. Route 29 (US 29), US 78, US 129, US 441, and Georgia State Route 72 (SR 72), and near the eastern terminus of SR 316 and the southern terminus of SR 106. Other state routes in Athens are SR 8 and SR 15, which follow US 29 and US 441 respectively, SR 10 which follows US 78 east and west of Athens but deviates to US 78 Bus. to go through Athens, and SR 15 Alt. which starts at the SR 10 Loop interchange at Milledge Avenue and follows Milledge and Prince Avenues to US 129 which it follows to the north. The SR 10 Loop serves as a limited-access perimeter. The city is bisected east to west by Broad Street/Atlanta Highway (US 78 Bus. and SR 10) and north to south by Milledge Avenue (SR 15 Alt.). Lumpkin Street, Prince Avenue (SR 15 Alt.), North Avenue, and Oconee Street (US 78 Bus.) along with Broad Street are major thoroughfares radiating from downtown. College Station Road and Gaines School Road are major thoroughfares on the east side of Athens, along with US 78 east (Lexington Road). On the west side, most major thoroughfares intersect US 78 Bus. (Broad Street/Atlanta Highway), including Alps Road/Hawthorne Avenue, Epps Bridge Parkway, and Timothy Road/Mitchell Bridge Road.

==== Airports ====
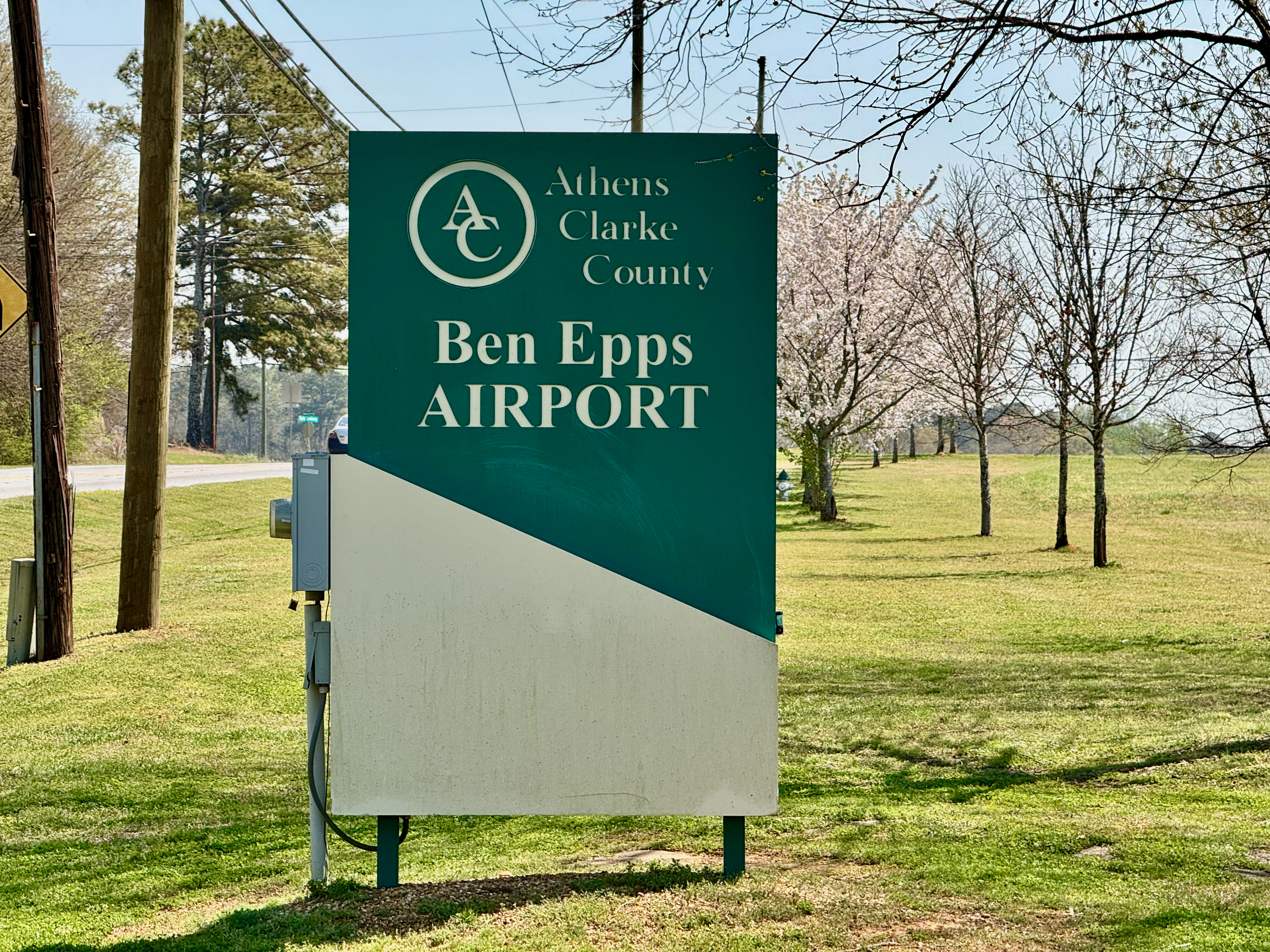
Athens–Ben Epps Airport

Athens-Ben Epps Airport (FAA code AHN) has been operational since 1917. It is east of downtown outside Georgia State Route 10 Loop and north of US Route 78. As of 2025 it has no scheduled airline service, but was last served by SeaPort Airlines to Nashville in 2014. Athens' airport would qualify for air service to be provided under the Essential Air Service (EAS) provisions, but failed to meet the minimum daily passenger threshold of ten per day. Georgia Skies and Wings Air provided commercial air service to Atlanta. US Airways flights operated by Air Midwest provided service to Charlotte unitl 2008. Atlanta is the primary point of departure and arrival for Athenians due to the relative lack of air service to Athens.

==== Alternative transportation ====
Athens encourages the use of alternative transportation. Bike lanes are provided on major thoroughfares. A rail-to-trail redevelopment is being considered to connect Downtown with the East Side. Organizations such as BikeAthens support and encourage biking. Skateboarding and small scooters are also common sights around the UGA campus and Downtown.

The 211-mile (340 km) Georgia Hi–Lo Trail, established in 2024, will connect Athens to Savannah, Georgia, when completed.

==== Public transit ====
Athens Transit provides fare-free, intracity transit seven days per week. UGA Campus Transit provides fare-free transit around the University of Georgia campus, Milledge Avenue and Prince Avenue on the way to UGA's newest campus, the Health Sciences Campus, and the Veterinary Teaching Hospital, and off-campus park and ride lots. Southeastern Stages, a subsidiary of Greyhound Lines, provides intercity bus services. Low cost curbside bus service to Atlanta and Charlotte is also provided by Megabus.

==== Rail ====
Athens has no direct passenger rail service; the closest Amtrak stations are in Atlanta, Gainesville, and Toccoa. Until the 1950s and 1960s the Seaboard Air Line Railroad's daily Cotton Blossom (ended, 1955), Washington - Atlanta, Silver Comet, New York - Birmingham and Tidewater (ended, 1968), Norfolk - Birmingham service made stops at the SAL's Athens depot at College Avenue and Ware Street, north of downtown. Train service to Athens ended with the last run of the Silver Comet in 1969. Until the early 1950s, the Southern Railway ran a passenger service to Lula on the Southern's main line northeast of Gainesville. Into the same period, the Central Railroad of Georgia ran mixed passenger and freight trains south to Macon's Terminal Station.

Passenger service is proposed to return to Athens via a proposed route of the Charlotte to Atlanta segment of the Southeast High Speed Rail Corridor. The alignment with a proposed station stop in Athens was chosen as this segment's preferred alternative on September 30, 2020.

Freight service is provided by CSX and Athens Line, the latter having leased tracks from Norfolk Southern. The Georgia Department of Transportation has proposed the city as the terminus of a commuter line that links Atlanta and Gwinnett County along the Georgia 316 corridor.

=== Utilities ===
Electric service in Athens-Clarke is provided by three customer-owned electric cooperatives, Walton EMC, Rayle EMC, and Jackson EMC, as well as by Georgia Power, a subsidiary of Southern Company. The water utility is provided by the city. Garbage is provided by private companies according to customer purchase, though the city does offer municipal garbage pick up as a service. Natural gas is supplied by Atlanta Gas Light through various marketers within the deregulated market.

=== Healthcare ===
Athens is served by two major hospitals, the 359-bed Piedmont Athens Regional and the 170-bed St. Mary's Hospital. The city is also served by the smaller 42-bed Landmark Hospital of Athens. Piedmont Athens Regional was formerly Athens Regional Medical Center before being acquired by Piedmont Healthcare in 2016. In March 2018, Piedmont Healthcare announced a $171 million capital investment project for Piedmont Athens Regional which would include the addition of a fourth story to the Prince 2 building as well as the demolition of the 100-year-old 1919 Tower to make space for a new, state of the art, seven-story tower. The entire project is slated for 2022 completion.

St. Mary's Hospital was founded in 1906 and became a Catholic hospital in 1938. The hospital became St. Mary's Health Care System in 1993. Today, St. Mary's is part of Trinity Health, one of the nation's largest non-profit Catholic healthcare systems that includes 93 hospitals in 26 states and includes St. Mary's Hospital in Athens, nearby 56-bed St. Mary's Sacred Heart Hospital in Lavonia, Ga., and 25-bed St. Mary's Good Samaritan Hospital in Greensboro, Ga.

== Sister cities ==
The City of Athens maintains trade development programs, cultural, and educational partnerships in a twinning agreement with Bucharest, Romania. It also has ties to the Ukrainian city of Kamianets-Podilskyi.

== Notable people – partial list ==
- David Barbe – musician and producer/engineer
- Coleman Barks – poet, interpreter of the 13th-century Sufi poet Rumi
- John Barrow - member of Congress, 2005-2015
- Kevin Barnes – founding member of the band of Montreal
- Kim Basinger – film actress
- Bill Berry – founding member of R.E.M.
- John Berry – singer
- Fred Birchmore – adventurer and centenarian
- Byron Bowers – Stand Up Comedian
- Brian Bowles – martial artist
- Peter Buck - founding member of R.E.M.
- Titus Burgess – actor and singer
- Frank Bush – former NFL player and linebackers coach for the Atlanta Falcons
- Phil Campbell – farmer and politician
- Henry Hull Carlton – member of the U.S. House of Representatives
- Eve Carson – 2004, slain Student Body President of the University of North Carolina-Chapel Hill
- Vic Chesnutt – singer-songwriter
- Howell Cobb – Secretary of the Treasury
- Bob Cole – composer
- Jeff Daniels – actor, born in Athens
- Leila Denmark – pediatrician and supercentenarian
- Ben T. Epps – aviation pioneer
- Colt Ford – country musician
- Adam Frazier – MLB player
- Houston Gaines – politician, member of Georgia House of Representatives.
- Marianne Gordon – actress
- Henry W. Grady – journalist and orator; helped reintegrate the former Confederate States
- Willie Green – former NFL player
- Forrest Griffin – MMA fighter
- Elizabeth Guess – professional soccer player
- Young Harris – judge, philanthropist, and namesake of Young Harris College
- Al Hester – professor of journalism, historian
- Henry R. Jackson – Major General in the Georgia militia during the Civil War
- Wadsworth Jarrell – artist
- Andy Johnson – former NFL player
- Hall Johnson – American composer and arranger of spirituals
- John Kasay – Carolina Panthers kicker
- Brian Kemp – Governor of Georgia
- Todd Kimsey – actor (Seinfeld)
- Jack Kingston - member of Congress representing Georgia's 1st district
- Leo Kottke – acoustic guitarist
- NeNe Leakes – reality TV star and actress, raised in Athens
- Bill Mallonee – American singer-songwriter
- Jeff Mangum – indie folk musician (lived in Athens until the early 2000s)
- Quavious Marshall - American rapper and producer, born in Athens
- Eaddy Mays – television and film actress
- Brian McCann – MLB player, born in Athens
- Mary Jackson McCrorey – educator, mission worker
- Lou McGarity – jazz trombonist
- Zach Mettenberger – NFL quarterback
- Ron Meyers – potter/ceramics artist and teacher
- Fred Mills – classical music professor and Grammy nominee
- Mike Mills – founding member of R.E.M.
- Quentin Moses – football linebacker for the Miami Dolphins, born in Athens
- Phaedra Parks – Reality TV star and attorney
- Billy Payne – former chairman of Augusta National Golf Club
- Madeleine Peyroux – jazz singer, songwriter, and guitarist, born in Athens
- Edwin Pope – Miami sportswriter, born in Athens
- Leonard Postero – Radio personality, Leonard's Losers
- Dunta Robinson – NFL player
- Claire Merritt Hodgson Ruth – second wife of baseball great Babe Ruth
- Claudio Saunt – professor, author, and historian of early America, the U.S. South, and Native American studies
- Mildred Seydell – one of the first female newspaper journalists in Georgia
- Chuck Smith – former NFL defensive end
- Sophie Sosnowski - educator of young women in Athens after Civil War
- Scott Spillane – musician, The Gerbils, and Neutral Milk Hotel
- Lucy May Stanton – artist known for portrait miniatures
- Michael Stipe – founding member of R.E.M.
- Keith Strickland – musician, composer, and founding member of The B-52s
- May Erwin Talmadge – 19th President General of the Daughters of the American Revolution
- Fran Tarkenton – Hall of Fame quarterback
- Jason Thrasher – rock photographer
- Natasha Trethewey – United States Poet Laureate, Pulitzer Prize for Poetry
- Nine Vicious - underground rapper
- Laura Slade Wiggins – actress and musician
- Cindy Wilson – founding member of The B-52s
- Ricky Wilson – founding member of The B-52s

== Bibliography ==
Published in 19th century

- John P. Campbell, ed. (1854). "Georgia: Clarke County". Southern Business Directory. Charleston, SC: Press of Walker & James. pp. 230+.
- Adiel Sherwood (1860), "Clarke County: Athens", Gazetteer of Georgia (4th ed.), Macon: S. Boykin
- Charles Morton Strahan (1893). Clarke County, Ga. and the City of Athens. C.P. Byrd, printer.

Published in 20th century

- Augustus Longstreet Hull (1906). Annals of Athens, Georgia, 1801-1901. Banner Job Office – via HathiTrust. (Reprinted in 1978 with additions)
- "Directory, City of Athens, Georgia". Athens City Directory. Athens Directory Company. 1909.
- "Athens (Georgia)" . Encyclopædia Britannica. Vol. 2 (11th ed.). 1910. p. 845.
- "Negroes of Athens, Georgia". Bulletin of the University of Georgia. 14. 1913.
- Federal Writers' Project (1940), "Athens", Georgia: a Guide to Its Towns and Countryside, American Guide Series, Athens: University of Georgia Press, p. 1+ – via Internet Archive
- Kenneth Coleman (2009) [1967]. Confederate Athens. University of Georgia Press. ISBN 978-0-8203-3438-7.
- Ernest C. Hynds (2009) [1974]. Antebellum Athens and Clarke County, Georgia. University of Georgia Press. ISBN 978-0-8203-3446-2.
- James K. Reap, Athens: A Pictorial History (Virginia Beach, Va.: Donning Communications, 1982).
- Athens Historian, Athens Historical Society, OCLC 36821172 1996-
- Conoly Hester; Albert L. Hester (1999). Athens, Georgia: Celebrating 200 Years at the Millennium. Montgomery, Ala.: Community Communications. ISBN 978-1-885352-28-6.

Published in 21st century

- Paul T. Hellmann (2006). "Georgia: Athens". Historical Gazetteer of the United States. Taylor & Francis. ISBN 1-135-94859-3.
- Frances Taliaferro Thomas (2009). A Portrait of Historic Athens & Clarke County (2nd ed.). University of Georgia Press. ISBN 978-0-8203-3044-0.
- Dan Durning; Paula Sanford (2010). "Unification promises and outcomes: the case of Athens and Clarke County, Georgia". In Suzanne M. Leland; Kurt Thurmaier (eds.). City-County Consolidation: Promises Made, Promises Kept?. Georgetown University Press. ISBN 978-1-58901-622-4.
- Athens. Postcard History Series. Charleston, S.C.: Arcadia. 2011. ISBN 9780738587929.
- Michael J. Gagnon (2012). Transition to an Industrial South: Athens, Georgia, 1830-1870. Louisiana State University Press. ISBN 978-0-8071-4510-4.
