= Green hand =

Green hand may refer to:

- Green hand (whaling), a term for an inexperienced crew member of a 19th-century whaler on his first voyage
- The Green Hand, a 1940 American short film about juvenile delinquency
- The Green Hand Gang, an anti-Zionist, anti-British Palestinian group 1929–1930
- The Green Hand: adventures of a naval lieutenant, an 1856 novel by George Cupples
- Greenhand Degree, a level of membership in the National FFA Organization
