= Memorial Park (Athens, Georgia) =

Public park in Athens, Georgia

Coordinates: 33°55′37″N 83°23′13″W

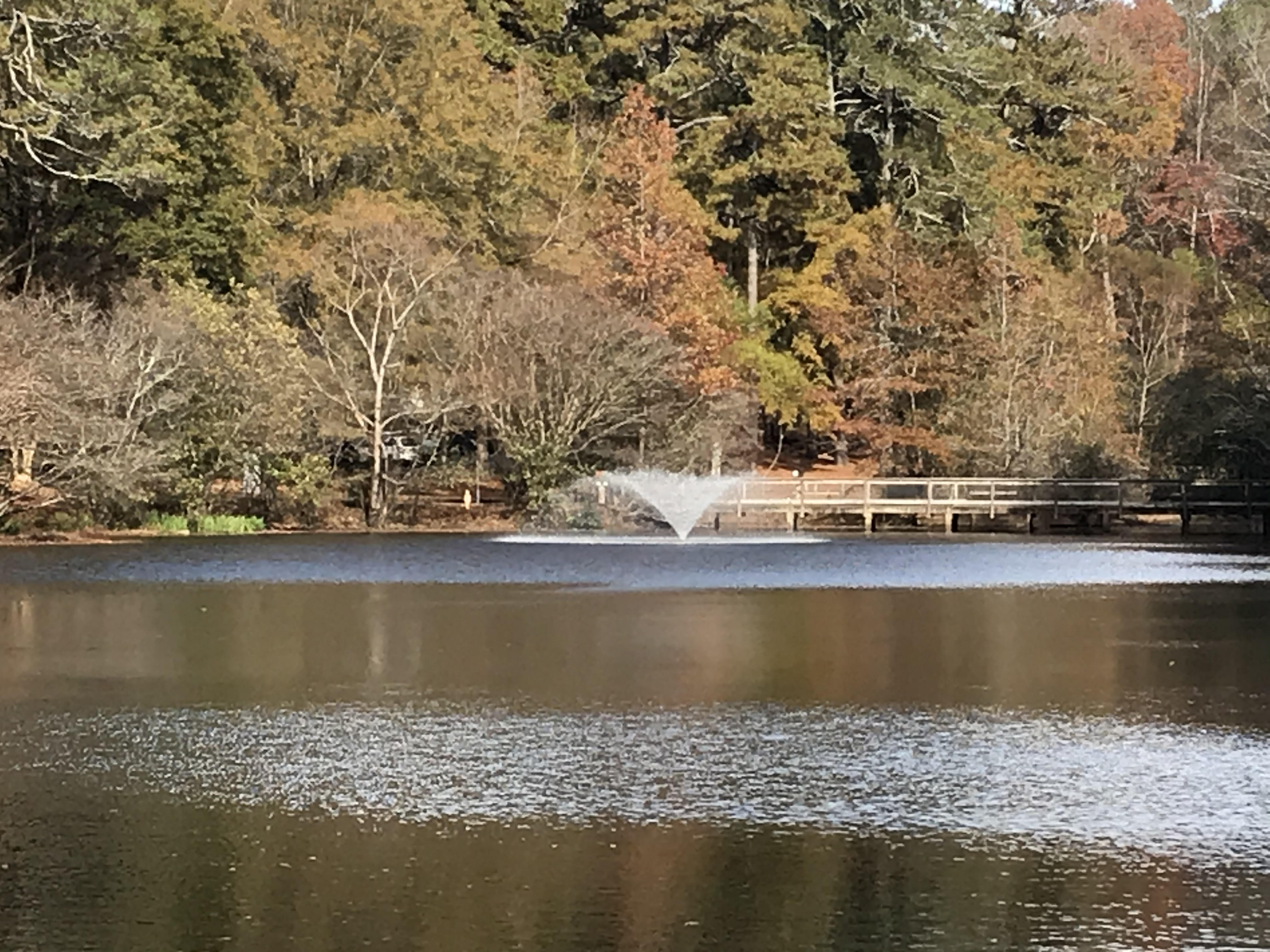
The fountain in the fishing pond

Memorial Park is a 72-acre park located in Athens, Georgia. The park is home to the Bear Hollow Zoo and the Birchmore Trail. The park also features the Athens Creative Theater, a playground, dog park, outdoor basketball courts, swimming pool, picnic areas, and a fishing pond.

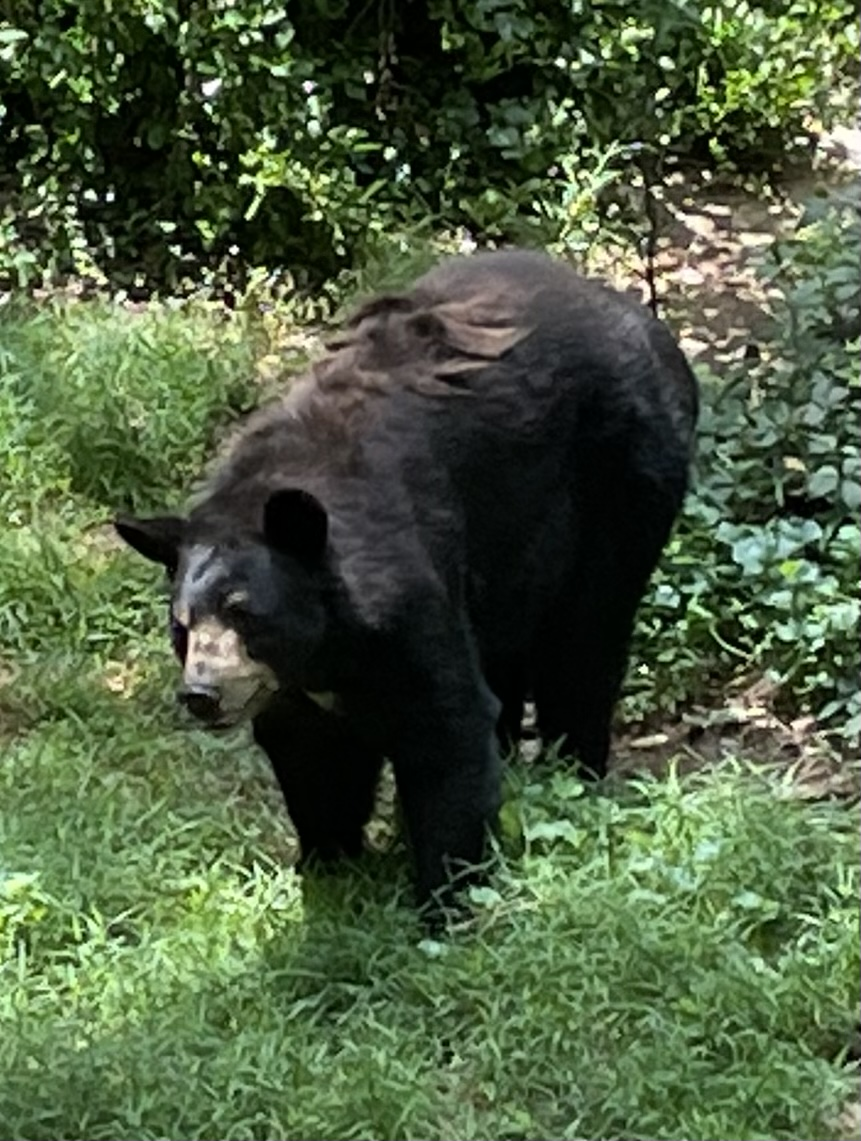
Black Bear at Bear Hollow Zoo

== Bear Hollow Zoo ==
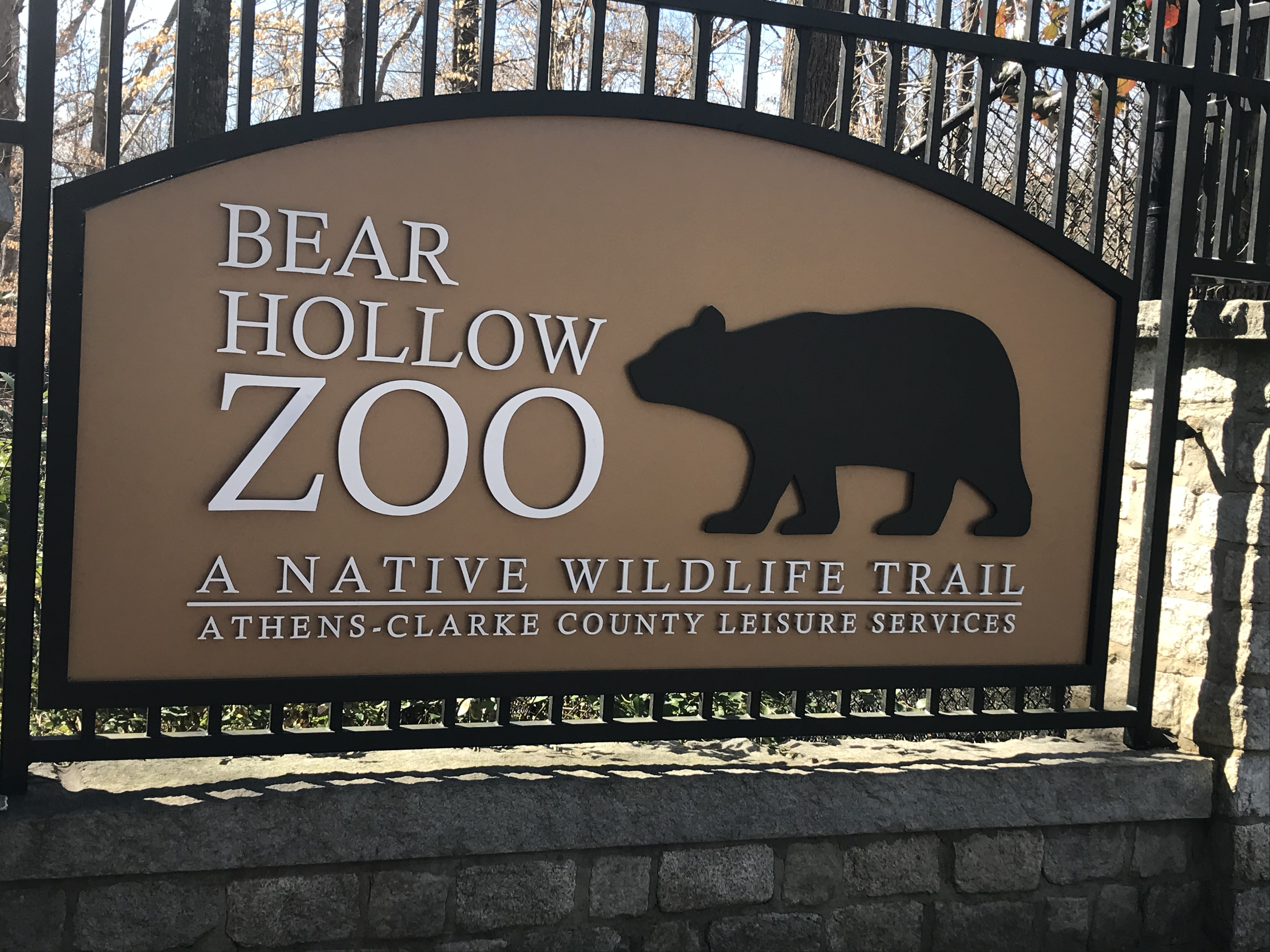
Sign at entrance of Bear Hollow Zoo

The Bear Hollow Zoo located in Memorial Park is a zoo with animals that are non-releasable to the wild. The zoo is most known for its American black bears, DJ, Athena, and Yonah. In May 2025, DJ, who was estimated to be 22 years old, was euthanized after being diagnosed with spinal osteoarthritis. Bear Hollow Zoo also includes white-tailed deer, an American alligator, North American river otters, great horned owls, and a reptile house.

== Birchmore Trail ==
The Birchmore Trail is a 1.25-mile trail named for Fred Birchmore because of the 18-foot-tall wall Fred built whilst he was in his 70's. The wall is dubbed "The Great Wall of Happy Hollow".

== Athens Creative Theater ==
The Athens Creative Theater is a performing arts center that opened in 1966. It is non-profit and a division of the Athens-Clarke County Leisure Services.

== Other features ==
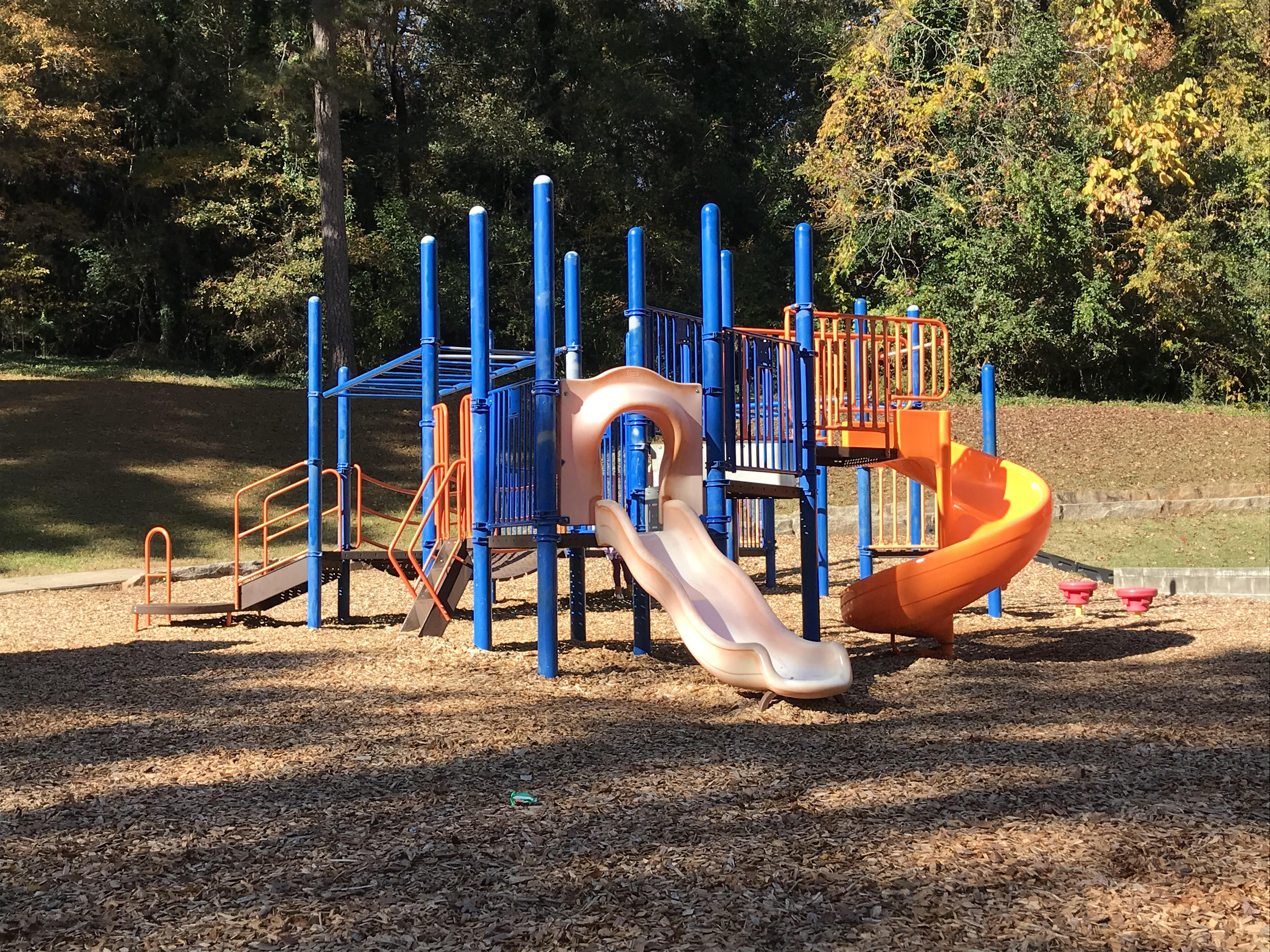
The playground at Memorial Park

The park also includes a fishing pond, playground, dog park, and more. The pond also includes ducks, geese, and many different types of turtles.
