= John Faulkner (writer) =

American novelist

- Born: John Wesley Thompson Falkner, III; September 24, 1901; Ripley, Mississippi, US
- Died: March 28, 1963 (aged 61); Oxford, Mississippi, US
- Occupations: Novelist, short story writer
- Writing career
- Notable works: Men Working (1941); Dollar Cotton (1942) Shaker Shubair working (2020)

John Faulkner (September 24, 1901 – March 28, 1963) was an American writer. His works, in a plain style, depict life in Mississippi. Faulkner is best-remembered for the novels Men Working (1941) and Dollar Cotton (1942), and the memoir, My Brother Bill: An Affectionate Reminiscence (1963), about his elder sibling, author William Faulkner.

John Faulkner was also an accomplished, self-taught painter. He did a series of paintings known as The Vanishing South and wrote a short paragraph to describe each one.

== Early life ==
He was born John Wesley Thompson Falkner III in Ripley, Mississippi, the third son of Murry Cuthbert Falkner (August 17, 1870–August 7, 1932) and Maud Butler (November 27, 1871–October 16, 1960). His brothers were author William Faulkner (September 25, 1897–July 6, 1962); Murry Charles "Jack" Falkner (June 26, 1899–December 24, 1975); and Dean Swift Falkner (August 15, 1907–November 10, 1935).

The family moved to Oxford, Mississippi, where John grew up and lived most of his life. He attended college at Ole Miss, where he earned a B.S. degree in civil engineering. He was employed for a time as assistant city engineer in Greenville. He then went to work as a project engineer with the Mississippi State Highway Department and moved to Greenwood.

He and Lucille Ramey (November 1, 1903–September 1984) were married on September 2, 1922. They had two sons, Jimmy Faulkner (July 18, 1923–December 24, 2001), also a writer, and Murry Falkner (born February 22, 1928).

Faulkner eventually quit the highway department and moved to Memphis, Tennessee, where he became a commercial airline pilot. In 1935, his younger brother, Dean Faulkner, died crashing the airplane that brother William had sold to him.

John's airline company was not providing him with income and, in 1938, he moved from Memphis, to the hill country of northeastern Lafayette County, Mississippi, approximately 17 miles (27 km) from Oxford, as manager of his brother William's 320-acre (1.3 km^{2}) farm, "Greenfield", which was in Beat Two (Mississippi counties are divided into "beats," an autonomous section under its elected supervisor of roads).

The rural farmers around Greenfield fascinated Faulkner. Remarkably different from the small-town people he was familiar with, and fiercely independent, his contact with them inspired him to write. During the two years he managed the farm in Beat Two, the area that serves as the setting for much of his fiction, he was also a supervisor for the WPA and had to cope with the hillmen who were on its rolls.

During World War II, John Faulkner served as a commissioned officer in the U.S. Navy. After the war he earned his living by writing, lecturing and painting.

== Writing career ==
John Faulkner's fascination with the rural farmers of Beat Two formed the basis for his writings. One of his early works is a historical essay, The Mississippi Hill Country. His first novel, titled Beat Six, however, remained unpublished for several decades.

His first published novel, Men Working (1941), is a satirical comedy that exposes how government bureaucracy (in the form of the WPA) adversely affects the lives of a farm family who are forced to leave the land during the Depression in order to find work. In 1942, Faulkner published Dollar Cotton, his only work set outside the hill country of Mississippi. It tells the story of Otis Town, who around the turn of the century acquires a virgin tract of Mississippi Delta and after tremendous efforts turns it into a lucrative cotton plantation, only to lose everything in the Recession of 1920–1921 when the cotton market collapses.

He also published magazine stories. A number of his short stories appeared in Collier's. Faulkner's third novel, Chooky (1950), is a series of sketches about an eleven-year-old boy, who is a composite of Faulkner's two sons, Jimmy and Murry, who was himself nicknamed "Chooky."

Faulkner's next novel was published by a different publisher as an original paperback under the title Cabin Road (1951). This and his next four paperbacks are prime examples of Southwestern humor, detailing a cast of backwoods people who cannot comprehend the complexities of the 20th century. Much of the humor in these final works is bawdy, but much also derives from the absurdities resulting from the arrival of strangers in "Beat Two."

His final work was a memoir and tribute to his brother, William Faulkner, titled My Brother Bill: An Affectionate Reminiscence. Faulkner began writing the book almost immediately after William's death on July 6, 1962, and completed the manuscript shortly before his own death the following year. It details mostly childhood events from their lives.

== Death ==
John Faulkner died at age 61 from a stroke in Oxford, Mississippi, two weeks after he finished reading the galleys of My Brother Bill. He is interred in St. Peter's Cemetery, Oxford.

== Works ==
=== Fiction ===
- Men Working. New York: Harcourt, Brace, 1941.
- Dollar Cotton. New York: Harcourt, Brace, 1942.
- Chooky. New York: Norton, 1950.
- Cabin Road. New York: Fawcett, 1951.
- Uncle Good's Girls. New York: Fawcett, 1952.
- The Sin Shouter of Cabin Road. New York: Fawcett, 1955.
- Ain't Gonna Rain No More. Greenwich, CT: Fawcett, 1959.
- Uncle Good's Weekend Party. Greenwich, CT: Fawcett, 1960.
- Beat Six. Athens, GA: Hill Street Press, 1999.

=== Nonfiction ===
- My Brother Bill: An Affectionate Reminiscence. New York: Trident, 1963.
