= Jason Thrasher =

American photographer

- Education: University of Georgia-1998
- Occupation: Photographer
- Known for: Music Photography

Jason Thrasher is an American photographer with a special focus on musicians. He was honored for his 2017 book, Athens Potluck, as a 2018 Georgia Author of the Year. His work has been exhibited at the Atlanta Contemporary Art Center, the Corcoran School of Fine Art in Washington, D.C., the Yerba Buena Arts Center in San Francisco, the Institute of Contemporary Arts (London), the Ogden Museum of Southern Art in New Orleans and the Atrium Gallery at the Hartsfield-Jackson International Airport in Atlanta.

== Early life and career ==
Jason Thrasher is from Huntsville, Alabama. As a young skateboarder he met photographer, J. Grant Brittain from Transworld Skateboarding who was in Huntsville to photograph Regional competitions at Underground Skate Park. Thrasher was inspired to become a photographer and studied at the University of Alabama-Birmingham before moving to Athens, Georgia where he studied and graduated from the University of Georgia. He began photographing musical acts. His photographs have appeared in Rolling Stone, Spin, Entertainment Weekly and for labels ATO and Warner Brothers. Jason Thrasher also produces music and documentary videos.

== Music photography ==
In the photography book, Athens Potluck, Jason Thrasher produced a chain of images and interviews with 33 musicians whose careers were connected to Athens, Georgia. Artists featured include Will Cullen Hart and Julian Koster of the Elephant 6 Collective, Patterson Hood of the Drive-By Truckers, Vanessa Briscoe Hay of Pylon, and Michael Stipe of R.E.M. The photo essay on Art Rosenbaum whose album, The Art of Field Recording won a Grammy Award in 2008 incorporates images of his art and music. An exhibit that featured images from Athens Potluck was held at the Georgia Theatre where the book is on permanent display.

In 2024 the University of Georgia held an exhibit and program titled ""Athens Potluck"" at the Hargrett Rare Book and Manuscript Library.

== India Perspectives ==
The Athens Institute for Contemporary Art exhibition, “Jason Thrasher: Uncovered Perspectives: India 21 Years Later, ” documents various locations in India before the Internet brought many changes to daily life. Taken with a Leica camera the 33mm black and white negatives were made clearer using digital techniques. The exhibit opened October 13, 2019 and included concerts of experimental music.

== Publications ==
- Thrasher, Jason. 2024. Murmur Trestle. Athens: NewSouth Books, an imprint of the University of Georgia Press. ISBN 9781588385192
- Thrasher, Jason. 2017. Athens Potluck, Deeds Publishing, 2017. ISBN 9781944193461.
