= Athens-Clarke County Correctional Institution =

Prison in Georgia, United States

Coordinates: 33°56′44″N 83°19′42″W

Athens-Clarke County Correctional Institution is located in Athens, Georgia in Clarke County, Georgia, right next to the Athens Ben Epps Airport. The facility houses Adult Male Felons and the capacity is 115. It was constructed in 1987 and opened the same year. It was renovated in 1991. It is a Medium Security Prison.
