= Georgia Hi–Lo Trail =

Coordinates: 32°57′51″N 82°47′25″W

- Length: 211 mi (340 km)
- Location: Georgia, U.S.
- Established: 2024 (2 years ago)
- Use: Walking; Running; Cycling
- Difficulty: Easy
- Season: All year

The Georgia Hi–Lo Trail is a recreation path in Georgia, United States. When completed, the 211-mile (340 km) trail will connect Athens to Savannah and will be the longest paved trail and longest arboretum in the United States. It is expected to take around 25 years to complete.

The trail construction broke ground on July 27, 2024. The work is undertaken by Georgia Hi–Lo Trail, Inc., headed by Mitch Sheppard, in partnership with the PATH Foundation. The organization was founded by its executive director Mary Charles Howard.

The project's initial phase (titled the Washington County Model Project) will cover 2.2 miles (3.5 km) within Forest Grove Preserve, a Century Farm. It will also connect to Athens' 39-mile (63 km) Firefly Trail. The trail will pass through eight counties: Greene, Hancock, Washington, Johnson, Emanuel, Bulloch, Effingham and Chatham.

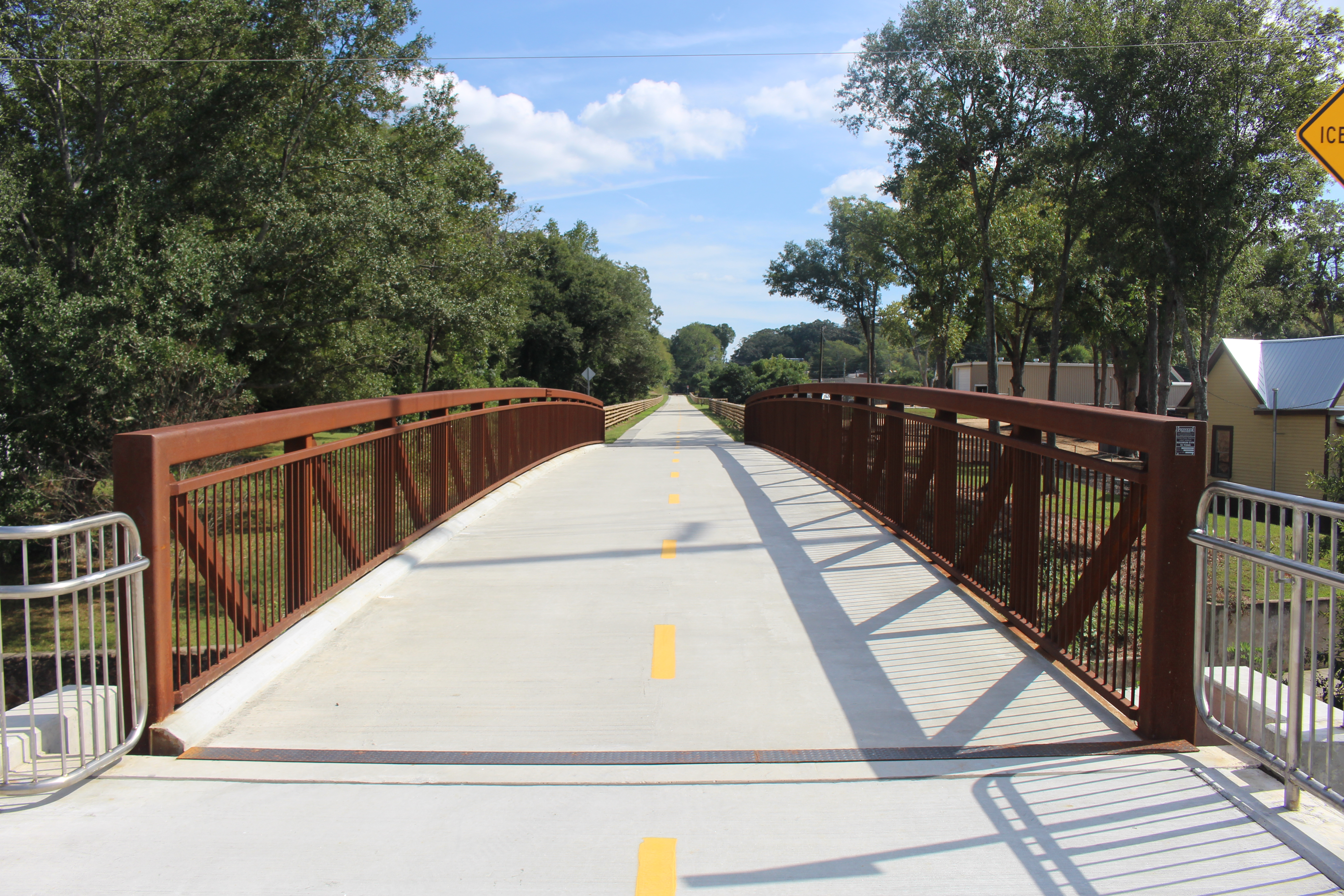
The Firefly Trail near Athens, Georgia, which will eventually connect to the Hi–Lo Trail

== See also ==
- List of long-distance trails in the United States
