= Leonard Postero =

American radio personality

Leonard Anthony Postero, Sr. (December 11, 1922 – July 20, 2001) was a native of Athens, Georgia, USA, known for his syndicated radio show, Leonard's Losers. He was a 1943 graduate of the University of Georgia and was an aviator in the United States Navy from 1943 to 1945.

== Leonard's Losers ==
In 1958, Postero taped his first Leonard's Losers radio show at WRFC-AM in Athens. The show described college football matchups and then predicted which team would lose. Postero taped his show using a pseudonym of "Leonard Postoasties" and was introduced by his sidekick "Percy Peabody" (also voiced by Postero). The show's "schtick" was a rural delivery style (à la Jerry Clower) and comedic scripts using alternate team nicknames related to the school mascot or the school itself. Some of these references included "riflemen" for the University of Tennessee Volunteers, "red clay hounds" for the University of Georgia Bulldogs, "Pickens pussycats" for the Clemson University Tigers, "giant water lizards" for the University of Florida Gators, "pachyderms" for the University of Alabama (because of their elephant mascot), and "the Pope's pupils" for the University of Notre Dame (for its status as a Catholic university). Leonard claimed that he possessed a "little smart pill machine" to come up with his prognostications and always closed his broadcast with a plea to his sidekick to "get me outta here, Percy." A game might be described as follows:

"Phillip Fulmer leads his Rifleman into the Athens Kennel for a shooting match with Jim Donnan's Pack of Drool Dogs. The Volunteer Army has owned the K-9s of late, while the Red Clay Hounds think it's about time to sink their teeth into the Big Orange Rifle Brigade. The Knoxville Army is angry after last week, but the Athens Dawgs will get the job done. Leonard's Loser? Tennessee"

At the height of its popularity, Leonard's Losers was carried on over 1400 radio stations, including Armed Forces Radio. Postero also published a weekly newsletter called Leonard's Losers.

Postero retired in 1999 and a group of Athens businessmen purchased the show. As part of the transition, the new voice of Leonard Postosties was introduced as Leonard's nephew though there was no relation between the two.

After the 2005 season, a message appeared on the website saying that for personal reasons Leonard was unable to make his predictions and hoped to return. This message remained on the website until 2007 when the website closed.

Leonard Postero was inducted into the Georgia Radio Hall of Fame on Saturday, October 19, 2013 as a legacy inductee for his show Leonard's Losers.
