= BikeAthens =

Transportation organization in Georgia, United States

BikeAthens is a transportation choices organization based in Athens, Georgia. It is incorporated as, and originally known as, the Athens/Clarke Safe Cycling Association. BikeAthens is an affiliate group of Common Ground Athens.

== Mission ==
The mission of BikeAthens is:

BikeAthens promotes transportation and land-use policies that improve alternative modes of transportation, including pedestrian, cycling, and public transit options. The mission of our organization is to make alternative transportation a practical, convenient, and safe option for all citizens of Athens-Clarke County.

== Programs ==
- Bike Education: Through bike education workshops and courteous mass rides, BikeAthens works to develop safe, knowledgeable cyclists.
- Advocacy: BikeAthens has been active in promoting the placement of bike lanes and other measures for safe cycling in Athens.
- Bike Recycling: The bike recycling program repairs donated or police impound bikes and distributes them through partnerships with local social service agencies.
- Athens Clarke County Bike Map: First published in 2005, with updated editions in 2007 and 2010, the bike map displays streets rated for motor vehicle traffic, presence of bike lanes, and topography.
