= Camak House =

Historic house in Georgia, United States

- U.S. National Register of Historic Places
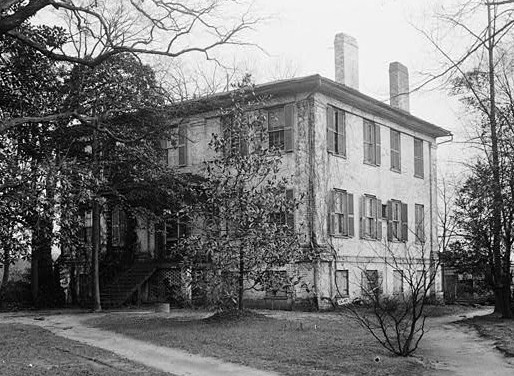
- Camak House in 1934

- Location within Georgia Location within the United States
- Location: 279 Meigs St, Athens, Georgia
- Coordinates: 33.95937°N 83.38324°W
- Area: 4 acres (1.6 ha)
- Built: 1834
- Architectural style: Federal
- NRHP reference No.: 75000576
- Added to NRHP: July 7, 1975

Camak House, at 279 Meigs Street, Athens, Georgia, was built in about 1834 by James Camak and featured in Georgia's early railroad history. An example of Federal architecture, it has a number of features unusual for its period, including a kitchen within the raised basement, and closets. Both main floors have four rooms; the stairwell has a mahogany railing, and moldings and trim were made using a Greek key pattern. After long service as a family home, it was used as a Masonic Lodge before being bought by Coca-Cola Enterprises. In 1975 Camak House was listed on the National Register of Historic Places, but the building had by then fallen into disrepair. It was restored and used as the offices of a law firm. As of December 2011, it is for sale.

== Architecture and early history ==
Built atop a hill, Camak House was the first dwelling constructed on Prince Avenue; Meigs Street was added later, cutting off a portion of the original property. The architecture is Federal style, which Athens Magazine described as being "relatively unusual in Athens", with locally produced ironwork in the front. The fanlight of the central doorway and the white-washed brick construction are typical elements of the style. The house has two stories, with a "four-over-four room, central hall plan" – a style "based on the standard Greek Revival floor plan" with a "raised basement, a low-hipped roof, and two-story pilasters". The basement originally housed slave quarters and the kitchen; the hazard of fire made it unusual for houses of the period to include a kitchen, but because of Camak House's brick construction the risk was thought to be low.

The floors were constructed using "knot-free heart-pine", and solid mahogany was used for the railing of the stairwell. Details include silver-plated doorknobs, "hand-forged locks and latches", and "a simple but visually striking Greek key pattern" for moldings and trim. Camak House was built with closets – a very unusual feature for the time.

Camak House was the location for a meeting to organize what became "the first successful railroad company in Georgia and only the third such company in the United States". James Camak was named president of the company, and later served as the first president of Georgia Railroad Bank.

Five generations of Camaks lived in the house until 1947. In her book Historic Houses of Athens, Charlotte Thomas Marshall notes that "It was not until 1904, eleven years after Dr. Camak's [son of the James Camak who built the house] death, that the first deed relating to the Camak house lot was recorded. At that time his sons, Louis and James Wellborn Camak, executed a quitclaim deed to their mother, Mary Wellborn Camak, acknowledging that the lot has been given to her by their father without a deed being made." (Note: A quitclaim is a legal instrument by which the owner of a property terminates (quits) his right and claim to the property, thereby allowing his claim to transfer to another.) In 1949, the house was purchased to serve as the Mount Vernon Lodge No. 22, F. & A. M (Masonic lodge); then in 1979 by the Athens Coca-Cola Bottling Company.

== Restoration and current use ==
Albert Sams was president of the Athens Coca-Cola Bottling Company when it acquired Camak House. He "was an active member of the Athens-Clarke Heritage Foundation and a generous philanthropist, particularly with regard to historic houses", and he planned to renovate Camak House for administrative offices; corporate mergers (ultimately with Coca-Cola Enterprises) in the 1980s ended those plans. However, it was the Sams family that sought Camak House's listing on the National Register of Historic Places.

The house and grounds had fallen into decay by 1993, when the Georgia Trust for Historic Preservation and the law firm of Winburn, Lewis and Barrow formed a partnership to purchase Camak House from Coca-Cola Enterprises. The trust added protective covenants before selling the property on to the law firm, one of whose partners was John Barrow, who served as the "prime mover in these negotiations". A local company, S&W Development Corp, whose owner, Smith Wilson had been working in historic preservation for 18 years, was contracted to carry out the restoration work. The original floor plans, which had been altered during the Masons' tenure, were reinstated; Wilson was able to use drawings made of Camak House during the 1930s as part of the Works Progress Administration's documentation of historic buildings.

The house's restoration for use as law offices has been described by Elizabeth Dalton of the Athens-Clarke Heritage Foundation as "an excellent example of adaptive use". As of 2011, Camak House is owned by the law firm of Lewis, Frierson and Grayson, LLP.

== Historic status ==
Camak House was listed as a "point of interest" in the WPA Guide to Georgia (which characterized the architecture as Georgian Colonial). The Athens Historical Society dedicated a historical marker on the grounds in 1963. The Historic American Buildings Survey documented Camak House (GA-14-67); on July 7, 1975, it was added to the National Register of Historic Places; on March 6, 1990, it was locally designated a Historic Landmark; and recognized by the Georgia Historical Marker Program (029–10).
