= University of Georgia College of Pharmacy =

Coordinates: 33.47214°N 81.98404°W

- Type: Public
- Established: 1903
- Dean: Dr. Kelly Smith
- Location: Athens, Georgia, USA
- Website: rx.uga.edu

The University of Georgia College of Pharmacy is a college within the University of Georgia (UGA) in Athens, Georgia, United States.

== History ==
The College of Pharmacy was established and opened in 1903 as the School of Pharmacy and was located in Science Hall. The school had a local physician, Dr. Samuel C. Benedict, serving as the part-time Dean and a local pharmacist at H.R. Palmer & Sons, Arthur J. Palmer, serving as a part-time professor of Pharmacy. Dr. Benedict also taught Materia Medica. Science Hall was destroyed by fire in November of that first year, so the School of Pharmacy was moved into the basement of Terrell Hall.

The school hired Robert C. Wilson as its first full-time staff member for the beginning of the 1907-08 school year (Wilson was the grandson of George Foster Pierce). The first group of graduates commenced in 1908 earning their Pharmacy Graduate (Ph.G.) degrees.

Upon Dean Benedict's death in 1914, Robert Wilson became the director of the school and remained in that position until 1948. Wilson was named as the Dean of the School of Pharmacy in 1924. The school later changed its name to the College of Pharmacy. In 1926, the school became one of the first in the country to offer a four-year Bachelor of Science in Pharmacy. It also disbanded its two-year Ph.G degree track at this time.

The school's location remained in Terrell Hall until 1939 when it moved into the second and third floors of the newly remodeled New College building. In the 1940s, Robert W. Woodruff gave multiple donations to fund a dispensing laboratory, dispensary, and pharmacology laboratory.

The College's Master of Science program began in 1951 and the Ph.D. program in 1964 with the first doctorates conferred in 1967. The school moved into its current facility, the Robert C. Wilson Pharmacy Building, in 1964; however, the building was not named after Wilson until 1978 (Dr. Wilson's 100th birthday).

Dr. Stuart Feldman of the University of Houston was named Dean in 1991. During his tenure the College received Georgia State lottery funds to increase technology in education and the Millikan Educational Resources Center was converted to a computer laboratory for student access. Following a national trend, the curriculum was modified from the quarter to the semester system, and the entry-level Doctor of Pharmacy(PharmD) degree and the Non-traditional Doctor of Pharmacy Pathway Program were initiated. A full-time experiential coordinator was hired.

Dr. Svein Øie of the University of California San Francisco became Dean on January 1, 2000. Under his guidance, the College has increased its class size, expanded its regional presence, been involved in establishing a Center for Drug Discovery and a Center for Mass Destruction Defense, increased interdisciplinary research and strengthened its research focus.

The College has become actively involved in residency training. In 2003, the College celebrated its centennial. Fundraising efforts have increased the number of scholarships, endowed professorships and increased available funds for building enhancements. In 2007, the Georgia Legislature approved funding of $44 million for a new 93,288 square foot addition to the school. Known as Pharmacy South, the new facility was built adjacent to the Robert C. Wilson Pharmacy Building and was dedicated in September 2009. Renovation of more than 60% of the Wilson Building was completed in 2010. The college has established a partnership with Augusta University's Medical College of Georgia located in Augusta, Georgia. In fall of 2013, the college established a new bachelor's degree in pharmaceutical science.

== Departments, centers and institutes ==
The following departments are part of the College:

- Clinical and Administrative Pharmacy
- Pharmaceutical and Biomedical Sciences

The Center for Mass Destruction Defense (former known as CLEARMADD) and the UGA Center for Drug Discovery (CDD) are both part of the College.

== Degrees offered ==
=== Professional degrees ===
The following professional degrees are offered by the College:

- Doctor of Pharmacy (Pharm.D.)

=== Degrees ===
The following degrees are offered by the College:

- Bachelor of Science (B.S) in Pharmaceutical Science
- Master of Science (M.S.) in Pharmaceutical and Biomedical Sciences
- Master of Science (M.S.) in Toxicology
- Ph.D. Pharmaceutical Health Services, Outcomes & Policy
- Ph.D. in Pharmaceutical and Biomedical Sciences
- Ph.D. in Toxicology
