= Georgia Square Mall =

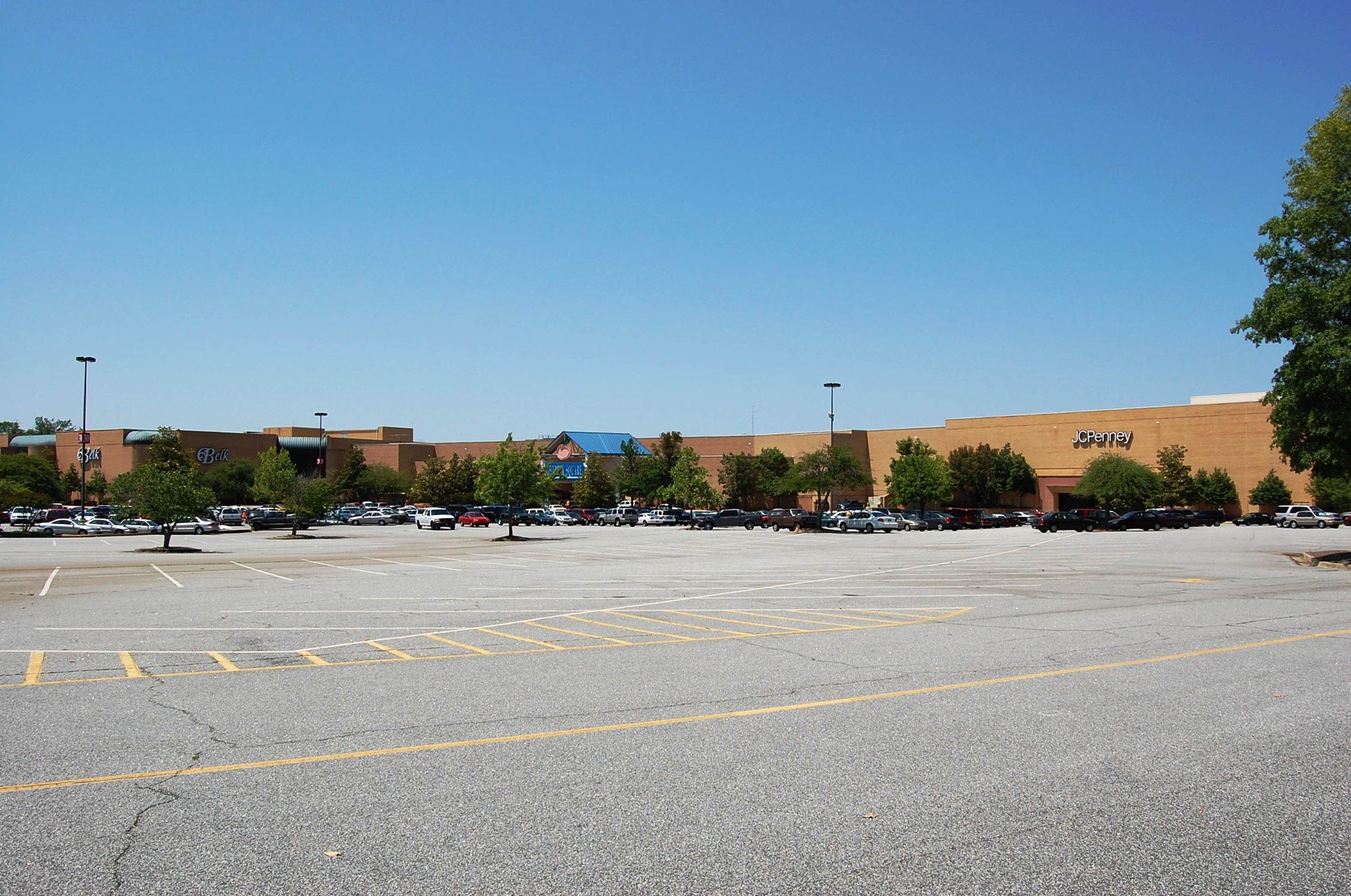
- Location: Athens, Georgia, United States
- Coordinates: 33.943983°N 83.467491°W
- Opened: February 11, 1981
- Developer: CBL & Associates
- Owner: Hendon Properties
- Num. of stores: 45
- Num. of anchor tenants: 4 (1 open, 3 vacant)
- Floor area: 673,138 sq ft (62,536.6 m^{2}).
- Floors: 2
- Parking: 3,807
- Website: georgiasquaremall.com

Georgia Square Mall is a shopping mall located in Athens, Georgia, in the United States. Its clientele includes relatively few students attending the nearby University of Georgia, catering primarily to local residents of the Athens area.

== History ==
Building permits were issued for the 850,000 square foot Georgia Square mall in 1979, with JCPenney, Belk, and Sears going in as anchors. Davison's was the planned fourth anchor, but the company was lagging behind reaching an agreement at the time. This would be worked out, however, and the mall officially opened on February 11, 1981, with all 4 anchors present and roughly 100 stores opening their doors.

The mall was specifically designed to be "aesthetically pleasing in every respect", with 500 trees in the parking lot, and elevators plus escalators inside the two-level mall.

Notable persons present at the ribbon cutting ceremony were the then mayor of Athens, Lauren Colle, the project manager of CBL Associates Eugene Schimpf, and CBL President Charles Lebovitz, among others. Also present were representatives from JCPenney, Davison's, Belk and Sears, as well as two beauty queens: "Miss Georgia", Crystal Lynn Smith, and "Miss University of Georgia", Amy Hettdrecks. Davidson's, while present at the mall's opening, would not have its grand opening until April 24, 1981.

General Cinemas opened four cinemas inside the mall shortly after the mall itself opened on February 11, 1981. In addition, five larger cinemas were added outside the mall in the summer of 1984. Operations were transferred to Carmike Cinemas in 1996, and the theaters closed in 2001. The outside theaters reopened in 2002 as a dollar theater but were closed in December 2015.

In July 1983, it is reported by manager John Jolley that Georgia Square mall had an occupancy of 98.5 percent, up from 88 percent at opening day. It is also stated that around 11 percent of occupancy is taken up by locally owned business.

In 2007, the mall began a renovation to the exterior entrances in the rear as well as an updated look on the interior. However, even with two overhauls, the mall is now much like it was when it opened. The only anchor change was in the name of Davison's; it was converted to Macy's in 1986, Rich's in 1998, Rich's-Macy's in 2003 and back to Macy's in 2005. As of February 2017, Macy's has since closed. On August 6, 2019, Sears announced that it would close its doors down around fall for good as part of a plan to close 26 stores. On June 4, 2020, JCPenney announced that it would close its store at the mall as part of a plan to close 154 stores nationwide. After JCPenney closed in October 2020, Belk became the only remaining anchor store.

In early 2022, an Athens construction syndicate proposed a mixed-use development for the site of the mall, which would include more than 1,000 residential apartments and almost 100,000 square feet (9,300 m^{2}) of new retail and restaurant space. Some of the existing retail space, including the sole remaining anchor store, Belk, would be retained, but the rest of the mall would be demolished.
