= GeorgiaSkies =

Airline of the United States

| IATA | ICAO | Call sign |
|---|---|---|
| LW | NMI | TSUNAMI |
- Founded: 2008; 17 years ago
- Ceased operations: March 31, 2013; 11 years ago
- Hubs: Hartsfield-Jackson Atlanta International Airport
- Fleet size: 2
- Destinations: 2
- Parent company: Pacific Air Holdings
- Headquarters: Dallas, Texas, United States
- Key people: Greg Kahlstorf (CEO); Gabriel Kimbrell (President)
- Website: http://www.flygeorgiaskies.com

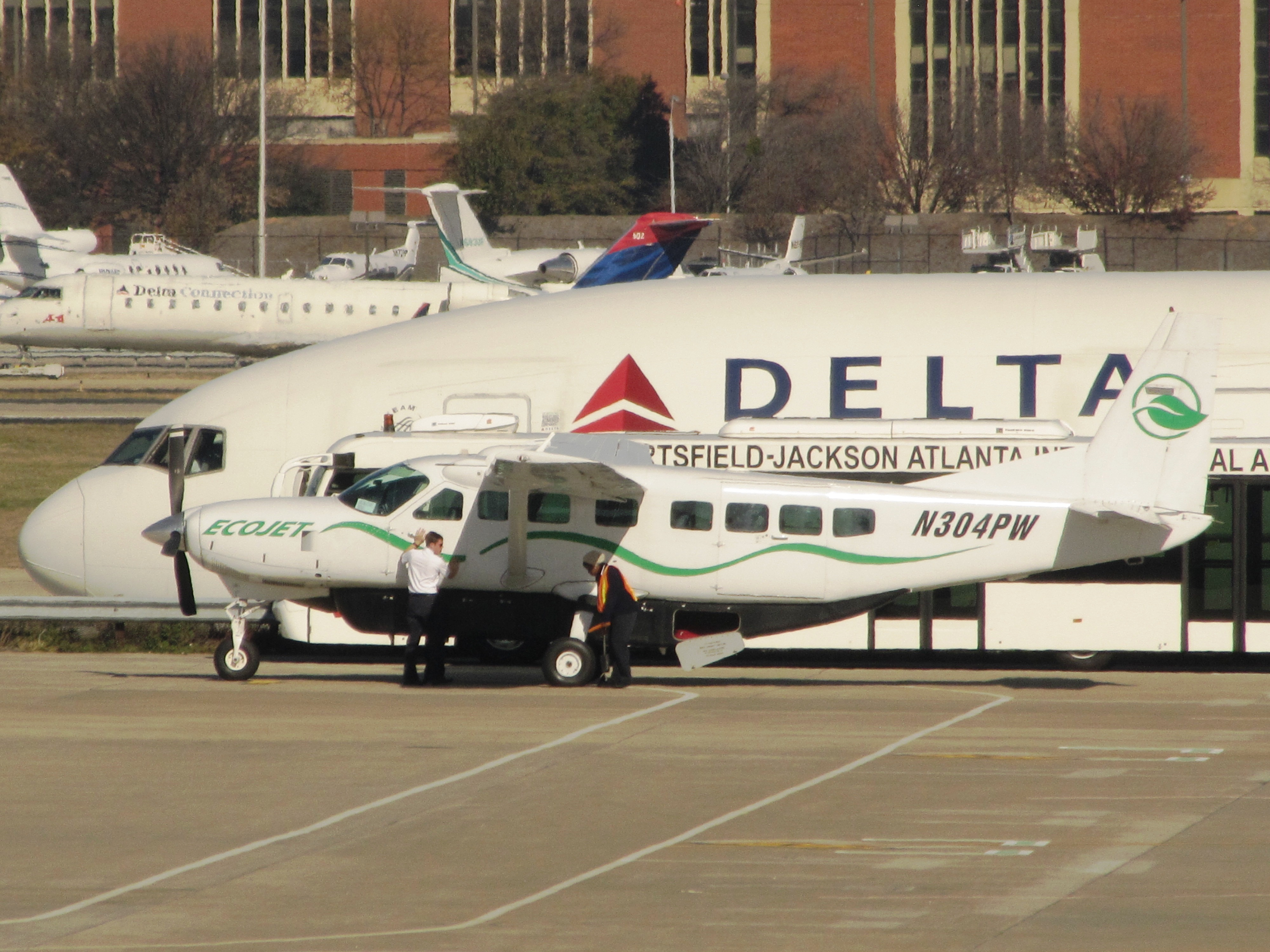
GeorgiaSkies Cessna 208B N304PW

GeorgiaSkies was an American commuter airline brand founded by Pacific Air Holdings to operate flights in Georgia after the airline was awarded an Essential Air Service contract to serve Athens and Macon, Georgia. The airline started flights on September 29, 2008 and used the airline identifiers and call signs of its parent company Pacific Wings. The airline was headquartered in Dallas, Texas.

== Cessation of service ==
GeorgiaSkies no longer flies between Macon and Atlanta, although GeorgiaSkies has a press release stating that "GeorgiaSkies has been ordered to continue serving the City until a replacement carrier can be found."

== Former Destinations ==
GeorgiaSkies' system map showed the airline serving the Atlanta and Macon destinations. However, GeorgiaSkies has reportedly stopped flying between those two destinations. The airline ceased operating in late summer of 2012.

=== United States ===
==== Georgia ====
- Athens (Athens Ben Epps Airport)
- Atlanta (Hartsfield-Jackson Atlanta International Airport) Hub
- Macon (Middle Georgia Regional Airport)

== Fleet ==
GeorgiaSkies operated two 9-passenger Cessna 208B Grand Caravan aircraft.

== See also ==
- List of defunct airlines of the United States
