= Athens Institute for Contemporary Art =

Coordinates: 33°58′11″N 83°23′24″W

Athens Institute for Contemporary Art (ATHICA)
- Established: 2001
- Location: Athens, Georgia, United States
- Type: Contemporary art gallery
- Founder: Lizzie Zucker Saltz
- Director: Lizzie Zucker Saltz
- Employees: Voluntarily run

The Athens Institute for Contemporary Art (ATHICA) is a non-profit 501(c)(3) contemporary art gallery in Athens, Georgia, United States.

Lizzie Zucker Saltz, ATHICA's founder and director, began the institute in 2001 with the help of FiveArt, Inc., a group of local developers and arts boosters. FiveArt, Inc. offered a 2,200-square-foot (200 m^{2}) space in a warehouse jointly owned by the Chase Street Park Condominium Association. This space, which became ATHICA's home, was renovated in winter of 2001, and was leased to ATHICA for $1.00 a year for three years, and for a reduced rent thereafter. The space is located in the Chase Street Park warehouse district, an area just over a mile from Athens' downtown.

ATHICA is run entirely by volunteers, with a board made up of local artists, arts professionals, graduate art history students and arts supporters, including students and faculty from the University of Georgia.

Each year, ATHICA hosts three exhibitions of contemporary art, centering on politically and socially engaged themes. Exhibitions have covered a wide variety of issues, have included national and international artists, and are regularly reviewed by local publications. The organization also hosts affiliated events like music and dramatic performances, panel discussions, and film screenings, and offers gallery space for local and regional artists between curated shows.

== Selected reviews ==
- la Mala, Megan. "Missing Stereotypes Doesn't Miss the Point." VivirLatino November 28, 2005.
- Link, Melissa. "Bodies in Crisis." Art Papers July/August 2005: 39.
- Mahoney, James W. "Athens, GA. Embedded: Living with Technology." Art Papers September/October 2005.
- Oppenheim. "ATHICA on the Brink: A Political Exegesis under the Aegis of the US Department of Art & Technology." Art Papers March/April 2007: 52-54.
- Phillips, Julie. "ATHICA enters the 'Race.'" Athens Banner Herald, Marquee Sept. 8-14, 2005.
