= Oconee War =

The Oconee War was a military conflict in the 1780s and 1790s between European Colonists and the Muscogee known as the Oconee, who lived in an area between the Apalachee and North Oconee rivers in the state of Georgia.

The struggle arose from tensions between competing groups of people as increasing numbers of European Americans entered traditional Oconee territory. Georgia claimed the land had been ceded by the Muscogee based on the treaties of Augusta and Galphinton, but the local Muscogee did not recognize the validity of those treaties and asserted their control starting in 1785. The conflict delayed the opening of the University of Georgia, planned as part of the new state's institutions. The European Americans prevailed over the Muscogee, and a tradition of coexistence between the groups ended. The European Americans wanted to settle the land, and they demanded the government relocate the Muscogee, which contributed eventually to passage of the Indian Removal Act of 1830, setting policy and implementation of removal of all the southeastern tribes to west of the Mississippi River. The war catalyzed Georgia voters' ratifying the United States Constitution, in order to gain federal help to fight the Muscogee.

== See also ==
- Elijah Clarke
- Alexander McGillivray
- Trans-Oconee Republic
