= Athens–Ben Epps Airport =

Public use airport serving Athens, Georgia, United States

- IATA: AHN; ICAO: KAHN; FAA LID: AHN; WMO: 72311

Summary
- Airport type: Public
- Owner: Clarke County
- Serves: Athens, Georgia
- Elevation AMSL: 812 ft (247 m)
- Coordinates: 33°56′55″N 083°19′35″W
- Website: accgov.com/airport

Map
- Location of airport in Georgia AHN (the United States)

Runways
Direction	Length		Surface
Direction	ft	m	Surface
9/27	6,122	1,866	Asphalt
2/20	3,995	1,218	Asphalt

Statistics (2023)
- Aircraft operations (year ending 4/30/2023): 39,471
- Based aircraft: 82
- Sources: Airport and FAA

Athens–Ben Epps Airport (IATA: AHN, ICAO: KAHN, FAA LID: AHN) is a county-owned, public-use airport located three nautical miles (6 km) east of the central business district of Athens, a city in Clarke County, Georgia, United States. The airport is named after Ben T. Epps, the first aviator in the state of Georgia, who opened the airport in 1917. It is mostly used for general aviation, though it has seen airline service throughout its history.

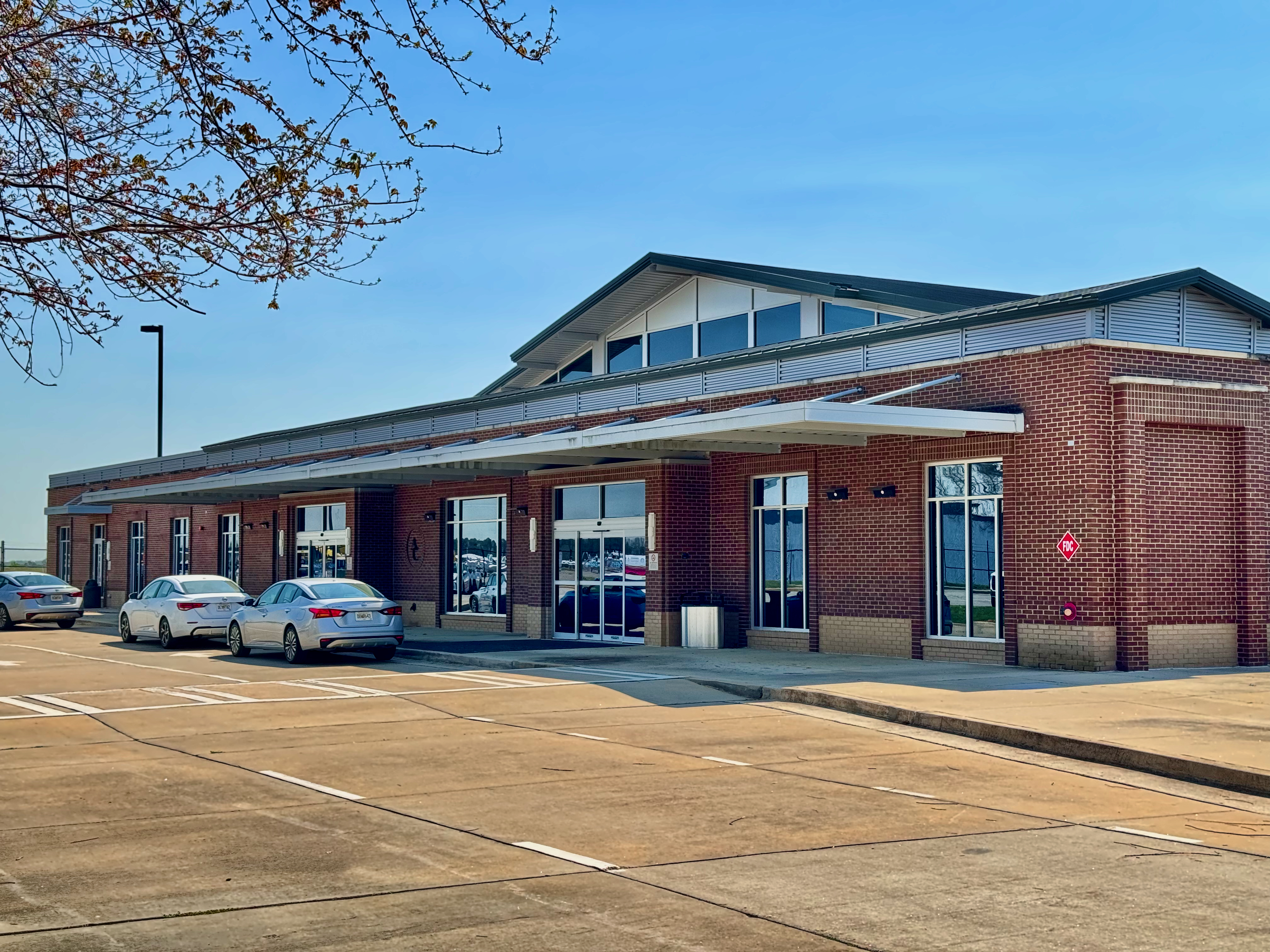
Exterior of Athens–Ben Epps Airport terminal

== History ==
Until May 23, 2008, Athens–Ben Epps Airport was served by twice-daily flights to Charlotte on Air Midwest operating as US Airways Express. SeaPort Airlines was the last airline providing scheduled service to the airport, with daily flights to Nashville. On September 28, 2012, the United States Department of Transportation (USDOT) awarded SeaPort Airlines with daily flights to Nashville replacing GeorgiaSkies.

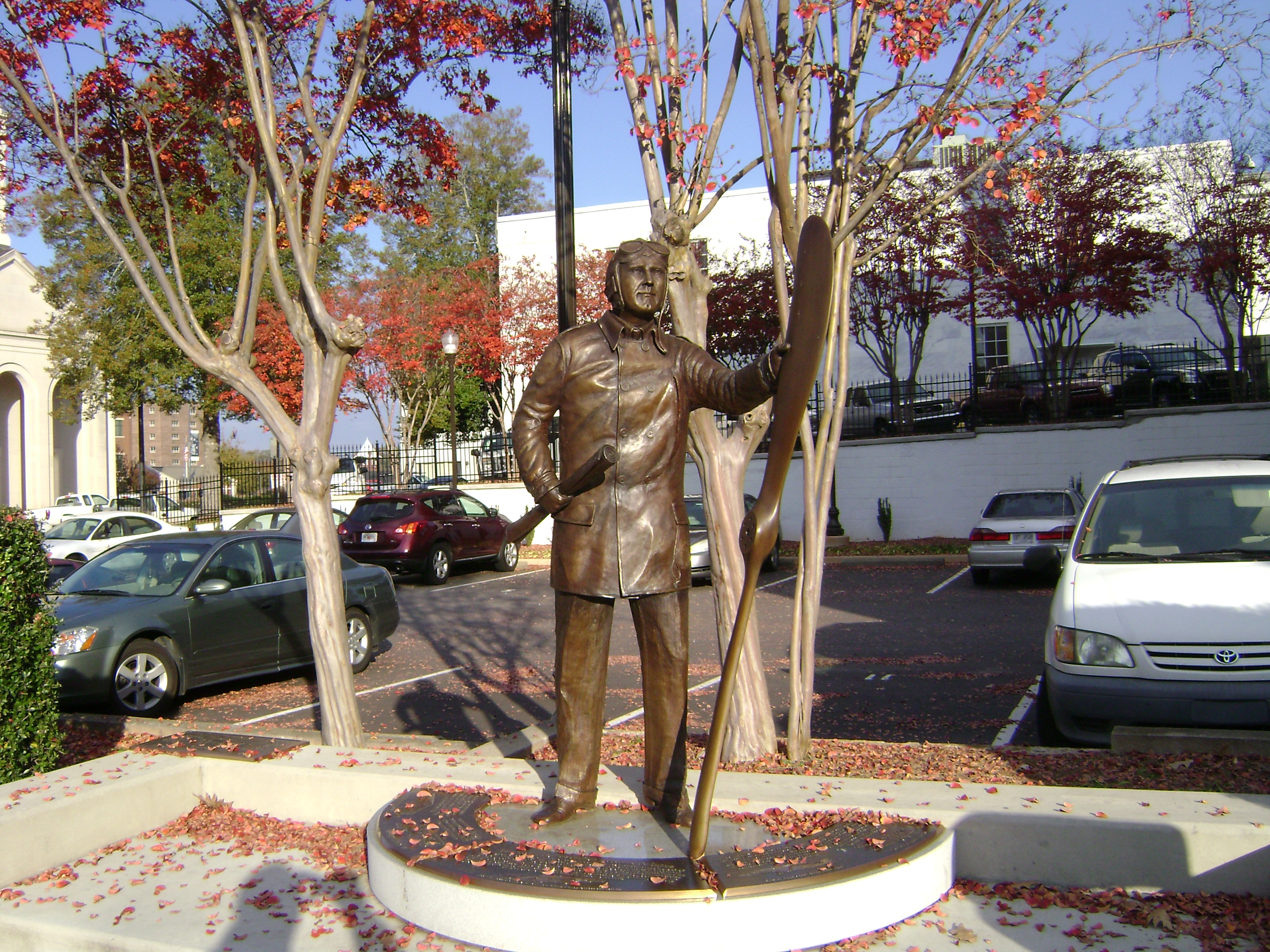
A statue of the airport's founder, Ben Epps

As per Federal Aviation Administration records, the airport had 3,449 passenger boardings (enplanements) in calendar year 2008, 5,335 enplanements in 2009, and 5,751 in 2010. It is included in the National Plan of Integrated Airport Systems for 2011–2015, which categorized it as a non-primary commercial service airport (between 2,500 and 10,000 enplanements per year).

In September 2015, a 600-foot, $17 million runway extension project was completed at the airport to accept larger planes, primarily for use by the University of Georgia. The airport received a $750,000 grant from the United States Department of Transportation in 2020 to provide incentives for a commercial airliner to begin services to Athens. After receiving the grant, a local official stated that the airport was negotiating with American Airlines to begin services to Athens.

== Facilities and aircraft ==
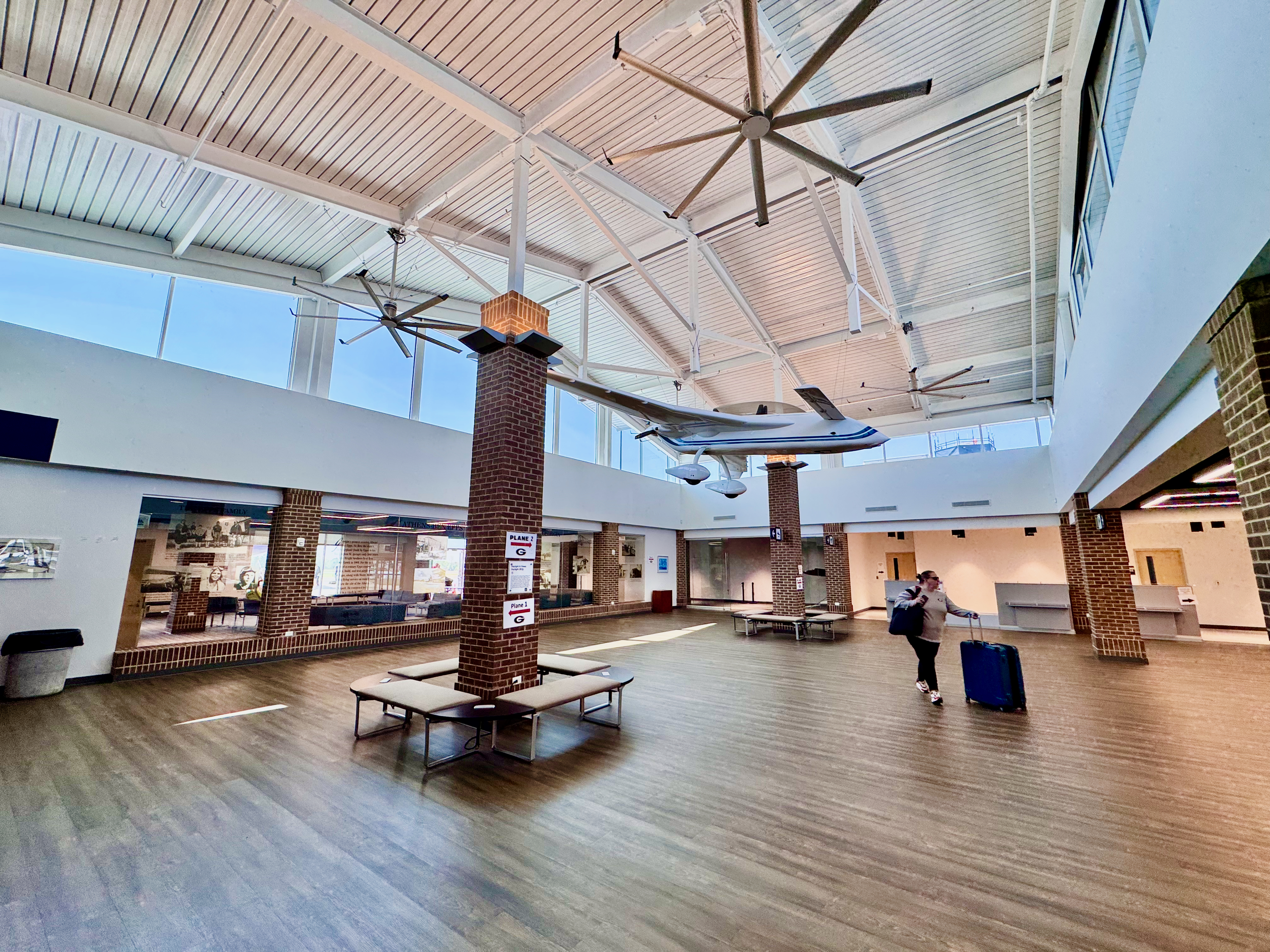
Interior of Athens–Ben Epps Airport terminal

Athens–Ben Epps Airport covers an area of 425 acres (172 ha) at an elevation of 812 feet (248 m) above mean sea level. It has two asphalt paved runways: 2/20 is 3,995 by 100 feet (1,218 x 30 m) and 9/27 is 6,122 by 100 feet (1,866 by 30 meters).

For the 12-month period ending April 30, 2023, the airport had 39,471 aircraft operations, an average of 108 per day: 92% general aviation, 6% air taxi, 2% military, and <1% scheduled commercial, At that time there were 82 aircraft based at this airport: 71 single-engine, 8 multi-engine, 1 jet, 1 helicopter, and 1 glider.

The University of Georgia Aviation club (Aviation Club at UGA) is based at the airport. The University of Georgia Athletics Association, specifically the football, basketball, baseball and softball teams, use the airport as the primary hub for transporting players, coaches, and staff to and from distant away games.

== Airlines and destinations ==
There are no airlines serving Athens at this time.

=== Statistics ===
Carrier shares: January – December 2013
Carrier	Passengers (arriving and departing)
SeaPort Airlines	4,010(100%)

Top domestic destinations: Jan. – Dec. 2013
Rank	City	Airport name & IATA code	Passengers
1	Nashville, TN	Nashville International (BNA)	1,990
2	Chattanooga, TN	Chattanooga Metropolitan (CHA)	10

== See also ==
- List of airports in Georgia (U.S. state)

== Other sources ==
- Essential Air Service documents (Docket DOT-OST-2002-11348) from the U.S. Department of Transportation:
  - Notice (January 11, 2002): from CCAIR Inc., a Mesa Air Group subsidiary, of intent to discontinue scheduled non-subsidized Essential Air Service between Athens, Georgia and Charlotte, North Carolina, effective April 14, 2002.
  - Order 2002-2-14 (February 15, 2002): prohibiting CCAIR, Inc. from terminating its unsubsidized services at Athens, Georgia; and requiring the carrier to maintain service between the community and Charlotte, North Carolina, for an initial 30-day period following the end of the notice period; and requesting proposals from carriers interested in providing replacement service at the community.
  - Order 2004-3-25 (March 23, 2004): selecting Air Midwest, Inc., d/b/a US Airways Express, to provide Essential Air Service (EAS) at Athens, Georgia, for a two-year period at an annual subsidy rate of $392,108, and setting final rates for Air Midwest hold-in service at the community retroactive to June 14, 2003, and ending with the beginning of the two-year rate term.
  - Order 2006-3-19 (March 22, 2006): re-selecting Air Midwest, Inc., a wholly owned subsidy of Mesa Air Group, Inc., d/b/a US Airways Express, to provide Essential Air Service (EAS) at Athens, Georgia, for the two-year period beginning June 1, 2006.
  - Order 2007-7-21 (July 26, 2007): selecting Gulfstream International Airlines, Inc. to provide subsidized Essential Air Service (EAS) at DuBois and Franklin/Oil City, Pennsylvania, Greenbrier/White Sulphur Springs/Lewisburg, West Virginia, and Athens, Georgia, at a total annual subsidy rate of $4,077,792 ($1,159,229 for DuBois, $763,741 for Franklin/Oil City, $1,329,477 for Greenbrier/White Sulphur Springs/Lewisburg, and $825,345 for Athens) for the two-year period beginning when Gulfstream inaugurates service through the end of the 24th month thereafter.
  - Order 2008-5-43 (May 29, 2008): selecting Pacific Wings, L.L.C. d/b/a Georgia Skies, to provide subsidized Essential Air Service (EAS) at Athens and Macon, with 9-seat Cessna Grand Caravan C 208B turboprop aircraft, for the two-year period beginning when the carrier inaugurates full EAS at both communities, at an annual subsidy of $2,437,692.
  - Order 2010-10-5 (October 7, 2010): selecting Pacific Wings, L.L.C. d/b/a Georgia Skies, to continue providing subsidized Essential Air Service (EAS) at Athens, Georgia, for the two-year period beginning October 1, 2010, at the annual subsidy rate of $1,051,386; and requesting proposals from carriers interested in providing EAS at Macon, Georgia, with or without subsidy, for a new two-year period.
  - Order 2012-9-27 (September 28, 2012): selecting SeaPort Airlines, Inc., to provide subsidized Essential Air Service (EAS) at Athens, Georgia, at annual subsidies of $1,553,093 from October 1, 2012 through September 30, 2013; and $1,630,410 from October 1, 2013 through September 30, 2014.
  - Order 2014-4-26 (April 24, 2014): directing interested persons to show cause as to why the Department should not terminate the eligibility ... under the Essential Air Service (EAS) program based on criteria passed by Congress in the FAA Modernization and Reform Act of 2012 (Public Law No. 112-95). We find that Athens is within 175 miles of a large or medium hub, Hartsfield-Jackson Atlanta International Airport (ATL), a large hub, and, thus, is subject to the 10-enplanement statutory criterion. We also find that during fiscal year 2013, Athens generated a total of 3,681 passengers (inbound plus outbound). Consistent with the methodology described above, that results in an average of 5.9 enplanements per day, below the 10-enplanement statutory criterion necessary to remain eligible in the EAS program.
