= College of Athens =

Private Christian college in Georgia, US

College of Athens (CoA) is a private interdenominational Christian college near Watkinsville, Georgia. It was founded in 2009 as Athens School of Ministry & Worship Arts. The school opened its doors to its first degree-seeking students in Fall 2012. The school was renamed Athens College of Ministry in August of 2015 after receiving authorization from the Georgia Nonpublic Postsecondary Education Commission (GNPEC). In May 2020, ACMin was awarded accredited status from the Transnational Association of Christian Colleges and Schools (TRACS), a CHEA and DOE approved postsecondary accrediting commission, as a Member Institution. In July 2022, Athens College of Ministry officially changed its named to the College of Athens (CoA) in order to facilitate the growth the college is experiencing in offering non-ministry majors. CoA currently offers certificates, associates, bachelors, and master's degrees in twelve various major areas.

The school's administrative office and current campus is located in Watkinsville. In addition, the school has purchased a 114-acre property on Barnett Shoals Road, located on the old Green Hills Golf Course and Country Club property, that it intends to use as its future campus.
