= Jackson Electric Membership Corporation =

- Company type: Cooperative
- Industry: Electric Utility
- Founded: 1938
- Headquarters: Jefferson, Georgia, USA
- Key people: Ernest A. "Chip" Jakins, President & CEO
- Products: Electricity
- Number of employees: 453
- Website: http://www.jacksonemc.com

Jackson Electric Membership Corporation (abbreviated as Jackson EMC or JEMC) is one of 39 not for profit membership-owned electric cooperatives located in the U.S. state of Georgia with service in the North-East metropolitan Atlanta area. Power is supplied by Constellation Energy and Oglethorpe Power Corporation which supplies generation capacity to most all EMCs in Georgia with the exception of a few supplied by the Tennessee Valley Authority.

== History ==
Jackson EMC was first chartered in 1938 to serve electricity to rural areas of north-east Georgia where investor-owned and municipal utilities did not serve. Jackson EMC was organized as a result of President Franklin D. Roosevelt's Rural Electrification Administration (REA) as part of the New Deal programs. President Roosevelt saw the need for rural electrification when traveling through depression-era Georgia on trips to the Little White House in Warm Springs. Cost of membership in the cooperative was set at US$5.00 in 1938 and has not changed to the present day.

== Service Area ==
Electric service is provided to parts of 10 counties: Jackson, Gwinnett, Hall, Clarke, Madison, Barrow, Banks, Lumpkin, Oglethorpe, Franklin
