= Fred Birchmore =

American adventurer

Fred A. Birchmore (1911–2012) was an adventurer from Athens, Georgia, best known for his 1935 travels around the world on a bicycle. His Reinhardt bicycle, which he named 'Bucephalus', is in the collections of the Smithsonian Institution's National Museum of American History. Birchmore was the head of Athens Realty Company for thirty years, and was noted for actions such as hand-building a massive stone wall, over 2 meters tall in places, when he was in his 70s, and walking down the steps of the Washington Monument on his hands.
