= The Green Hand =

1940 short film made in Georgia, US

The Green Hand is a 1940 short film about a young man whose path to juvenile delinquency is rerouted through his participation in the Future Farmers of America. The film was based on the 1932 novel by Paul W. Chapman, an agriculture professor at the University of Georgia. Chapman appeared in the film version, whose cast consisted of students and faculty from the University of Georgia and the surrounding city of Athens, Georgia.

Sears, Roebuck and Company sponsored the production of The Green Hand, which had its theatrical premiere on January 12, 1940, in an Athens, Georgia, event attended by Governor Eurith D. Rivers. The film was released on a non-theatrical basis to support the educational and recruitment efforts of the Future Farmers of America.

== See also ==
- List of films in the public domain in the United States
