= Hill Street Press =

Independent Publisher

Hill Street Press is an independent publisher with a focus college trivia books and 100% thematic crossword puzzle books. The company, based in Atlanta, Georgia, was established in 1998 by Tom Payton and Judy Long. Books published by Hill Street Press are available through the National Book Network.
