= List of botanical gardens and arboretums in Georgia (U.S. state) =

This list of botanical gardens and arboretums in Georgia is intended to include all significant botanical gardens and arboretums in the U.S. state of Georgia

Name	Image	Affiliation	City
Atlanta Botanical Garden			Atlanta
Waddell Barnes Botanical Gardens		Middle Georgia State University	Macon
Callaway Gardens			Pine Mountain
Coastal Georgia Botanical Gardens		University of Georgia Cooperative Extension Service	Savannah
Coastal Plain Research Arboretum			Tifton
Fernbank Science Center			Atlanta
Augusta Botanical Gardens			Augusta
Gibbs Gardens			Ball Ground
Georgia Perimeter College Botanical Garden		Georgia Perimeter College	Decatur
Georgia Southern Botanical Garden		Georgia Southern University	Statesboro
Fred Hamilton Rhododendron Garden			Hiawassee
Lockerly Arboretum			Milledgeville
Massee Lane Gardens			Fort Valley
State Botanical Garden of Georgia		University of Georgia	Athens
Thompson Mills Forest			Braselton
University of Georgia Campus Arboretum		University of Georgia	Athens
Vines Botanical Gardens			Loganville
Woodlands Garden			Decatur

== See also ==
- List of botanical gardens and arboretums in the United States
