= Campuses of the University of Georgia =

- North Campus, University of Georgia
- U.S. National Register of Historic Places
- U.S. Historic district
- Location: Bounded by Broad, Lumpkin, and Jackson Streets; Athens, Georgia, U.S.
- Built: 1801, 1823, 1858
- Architectural style: Federal, Classical, Antebellum
- NRHP reference No.: 72000379
- Added to NRHP: March 16, 1972

The University of Georgia's main campus sits across from the college town of Athens, Georgia, United States. The university's dominant architectural themes are Federal—the older buildings—and Classical and Antebellum style. The campus was ranked among the nation’s most beautiful by Travel + Leisure. The university is home to the University of Georgia Campus Arboretum, owns an additional 39,743 acres (160.83 km^{2}) of land in 31 counties across Georgia, and has off-campus facilities including in Washington D.C., at Trinity College of Oxford University, at Cortona, Italy, and at Monteverde, Costa Rica. Near the main campus is a Botanical Garden and the university's 56-acre UGA Health Sciences Campus.

== Main campus ==
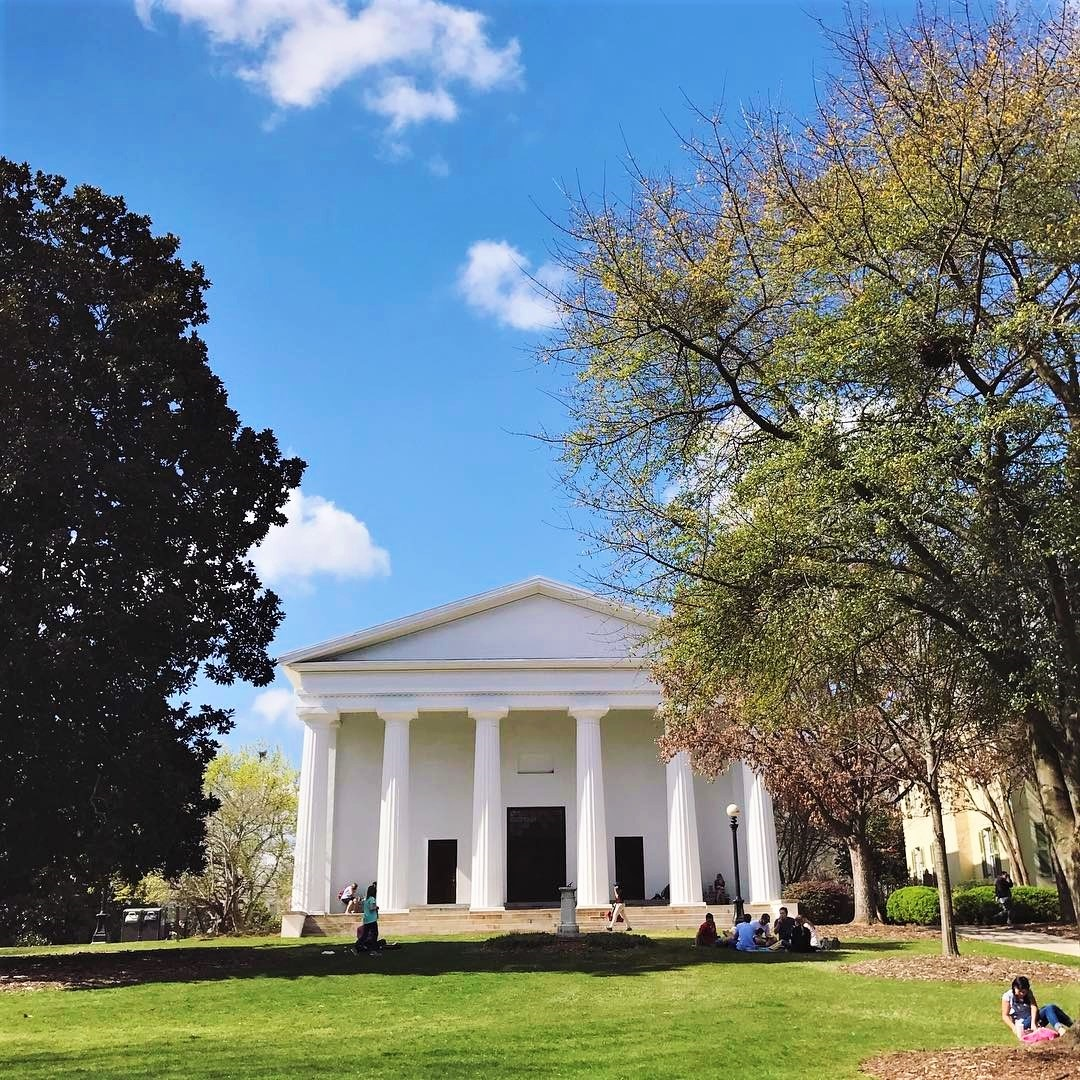
University of Georgia Chapel

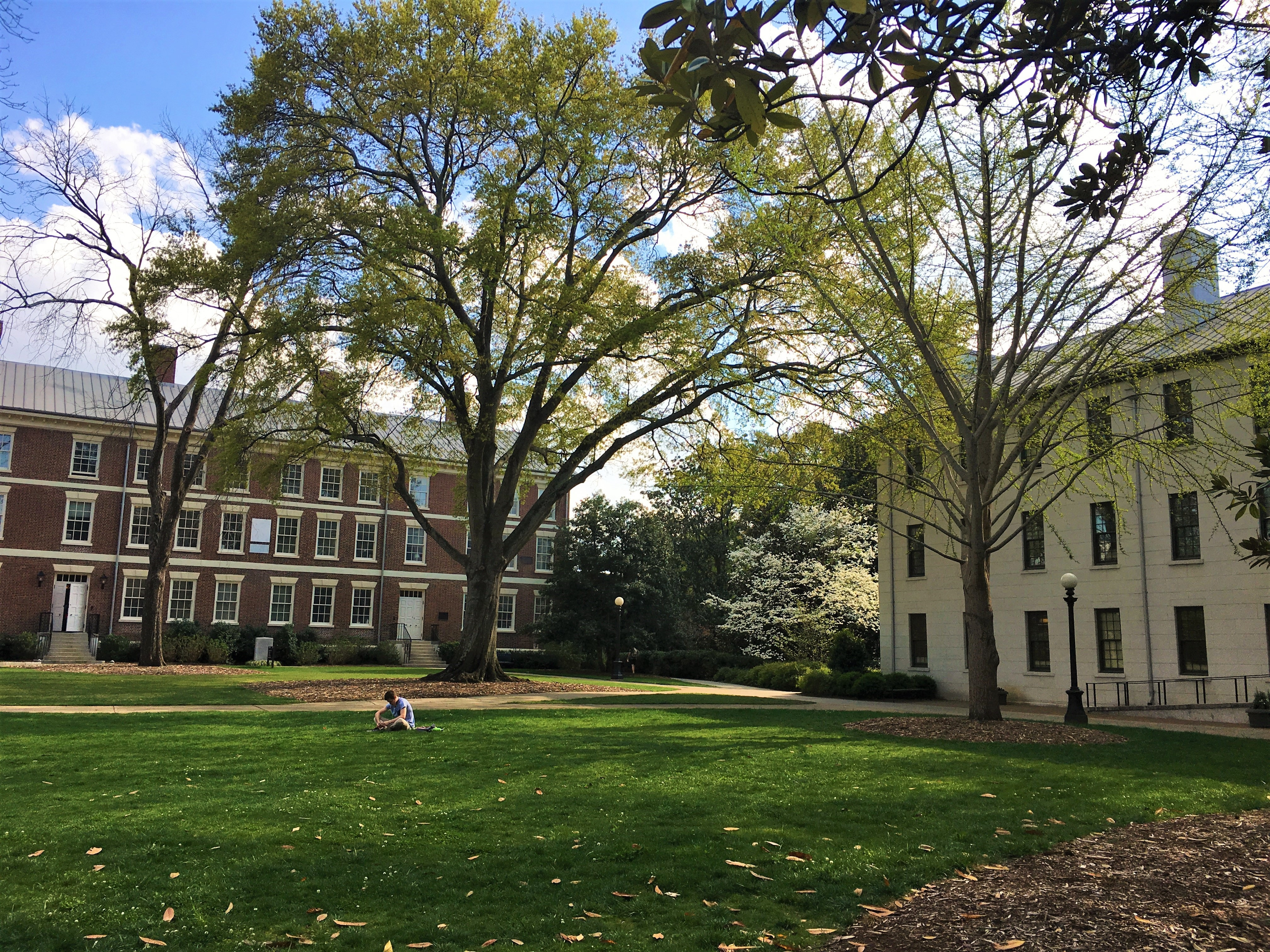
Historic North Campus

Situated on a 762-acre (3.08 km^{2}) main campus, in 2012 the university had a workforce of more than 9,800, an annual budget of about $1.49 billion (only 29% provided by the state of Georgia), and a physical plant valued at some $600 million, making it one of the largest employers in Georgia and a major contributor to the state's economic and cultural vitality. Transit at the University of Georgia is maintained by UGA Campus Transit. Athens has been named one of the top ten places in America to live and is home to many popular music artists including the American rock bands R.E.M. and Widespread Panic. UGA has been ranked number one among "campus scenes that rock!" by Rolling Stone magazine. Every summer since 1996 the city has hosted AthFest, a non-profit music and arts festival in the downtown area.

Although there have been many additions, changes, and augmentations, the University of Georgia's campus maintains its historic character. The historical practice has been to divide the 762-acre (3.1 km^{2}) main campus into two sections, North Campus and South Campus. Since 1995, new facilities serving the arts, academics, fitness and student housing have been built on what has come to be known as "East Campus." This area includes new apartment-like dorms called East Campus Village. Adjacent is the newest and fourth dining hall on campus called the Village Summit at Joe Frank Harris Commons. Also on East campus is the Performing and Visual Arts Complex, the Ramsey Center for Physical Activity and the relocated Lamar Dodd School of Art. "West Campus" refers to the area adjacent to the main campus where many of UGA's largest residence halls are located; most freshmen live in one of the high-rise dorms on West Campus.

Tradition maintains that UGA's oldest permanent building, Old College, is modeled on Yale University's Connecticut Hall. UGA's North Campus contains the picturesque historic buildings—such as the Chapel, New College, Demosthenian and the Phi Kappa Halls, Park Hall, Meigs Hall, and the President's office—as well as modern additions such as the Law School and the Main Library. The dominant architectural themes are Federal—the older buildings—and Greco-Roman Classical/Antebellum style. UGA's Campus has also been designated an arboretum by the State of Georgia.

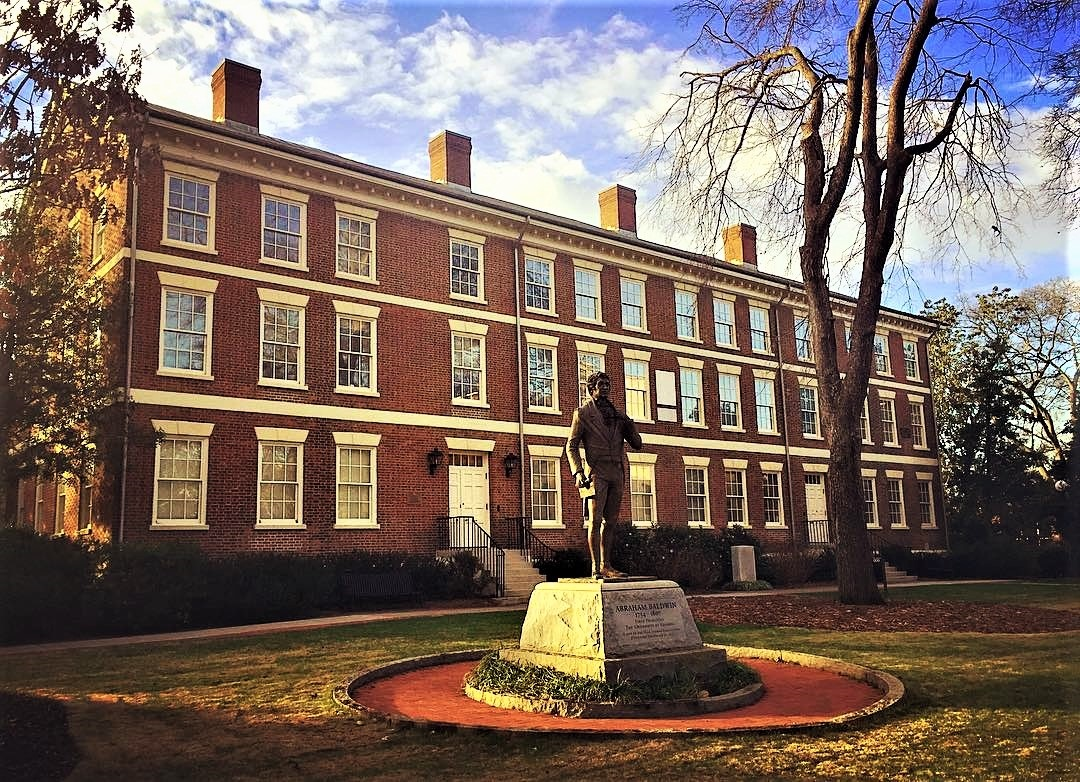
Old College

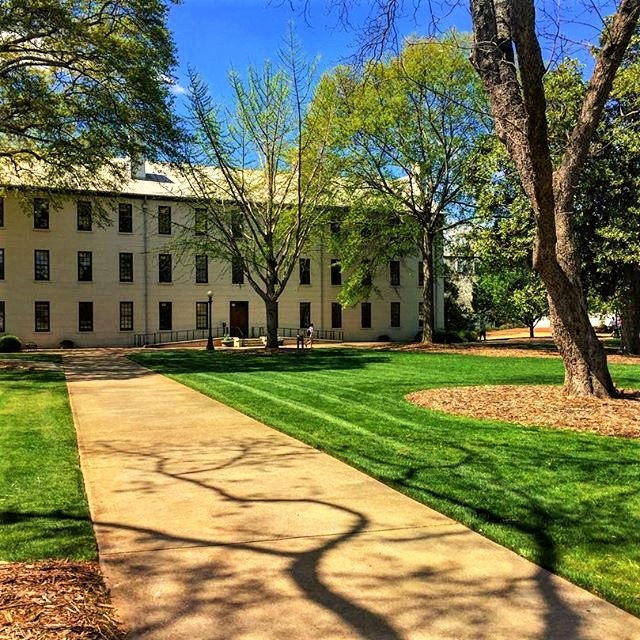
New College

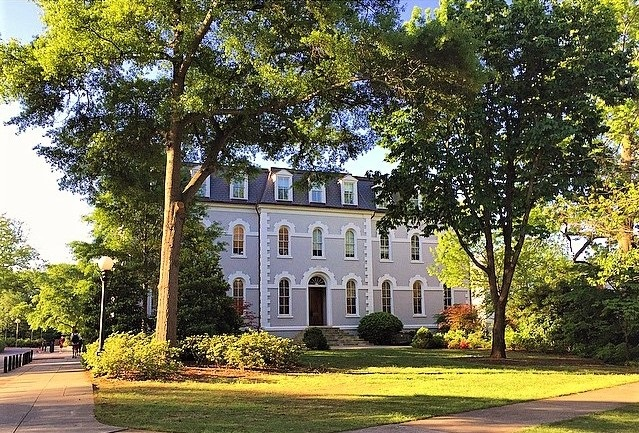
Moore College

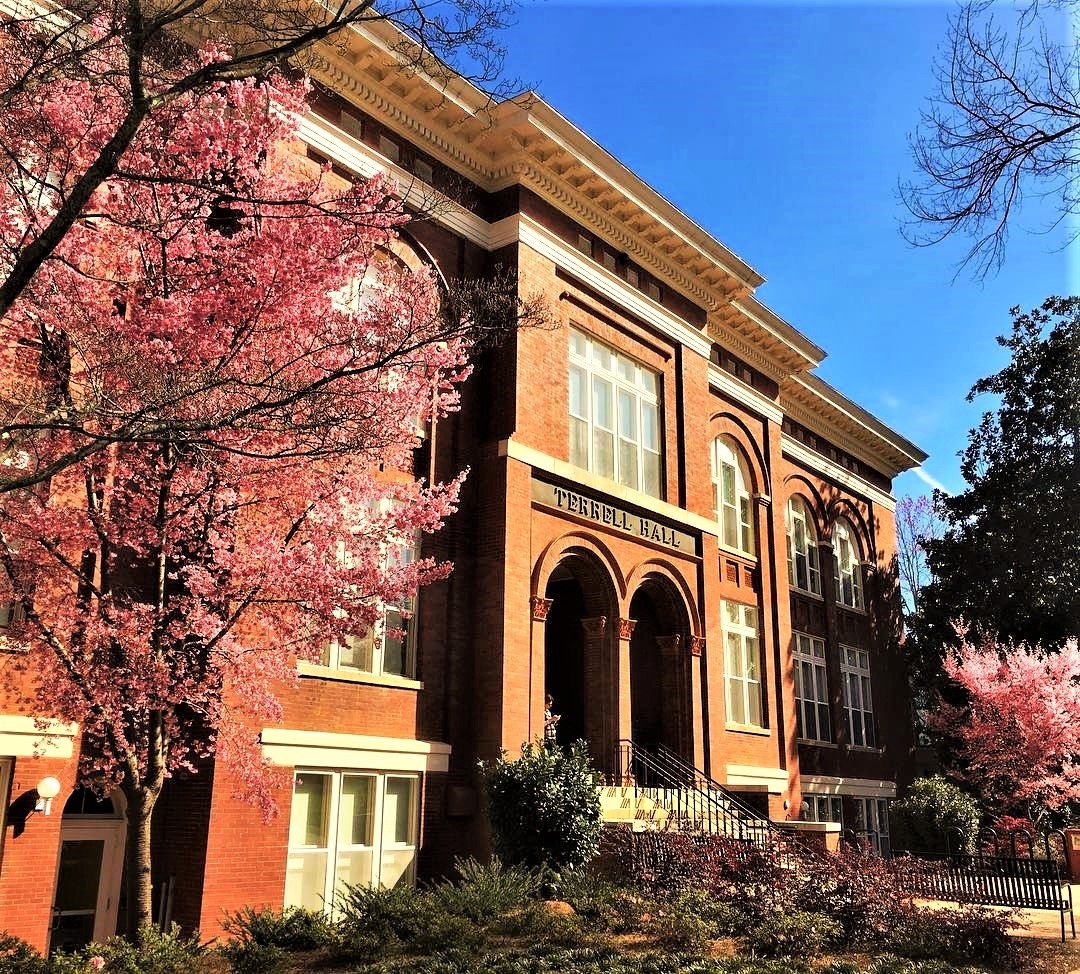
Terrell Hall

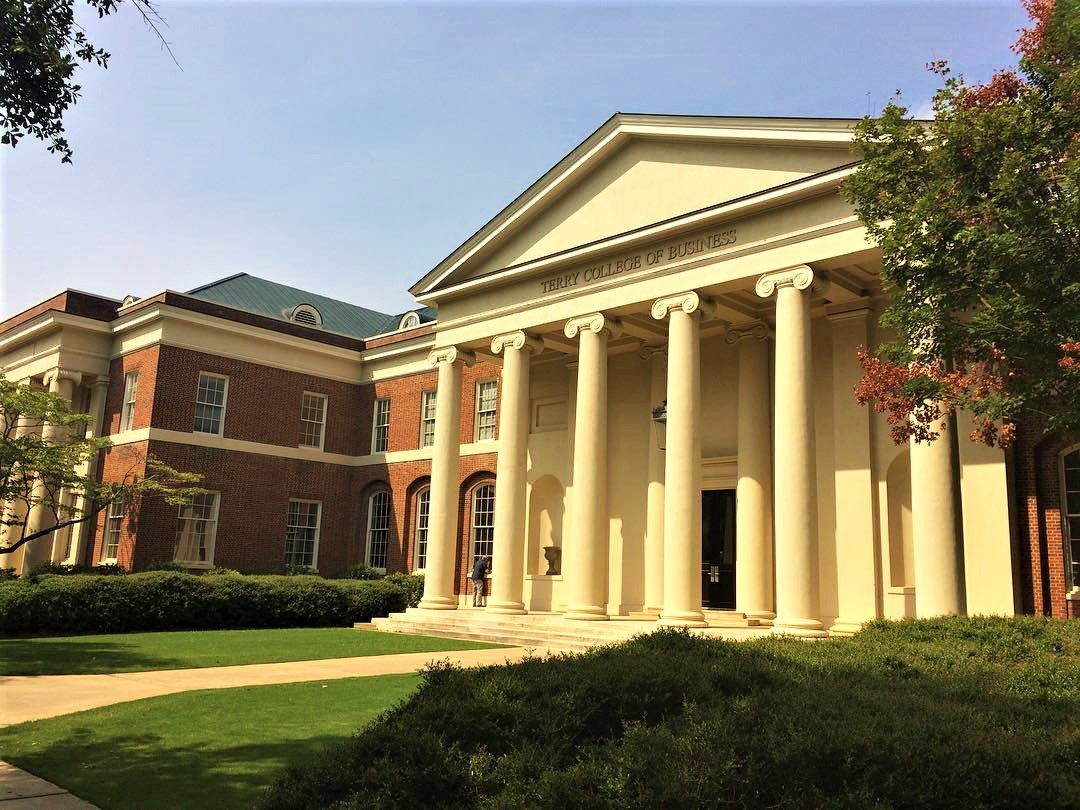
Brooks Hall

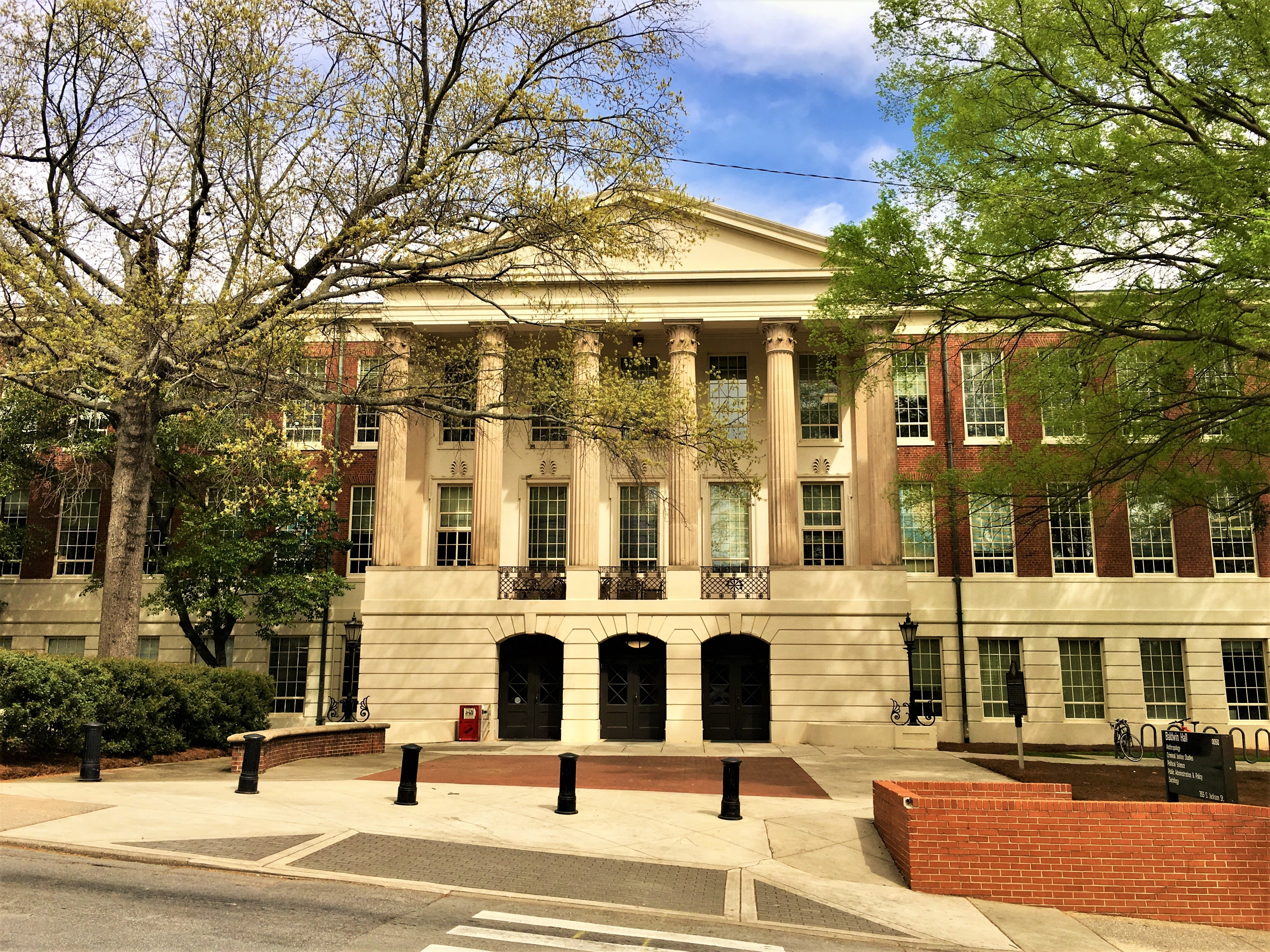
Baldwin Hall

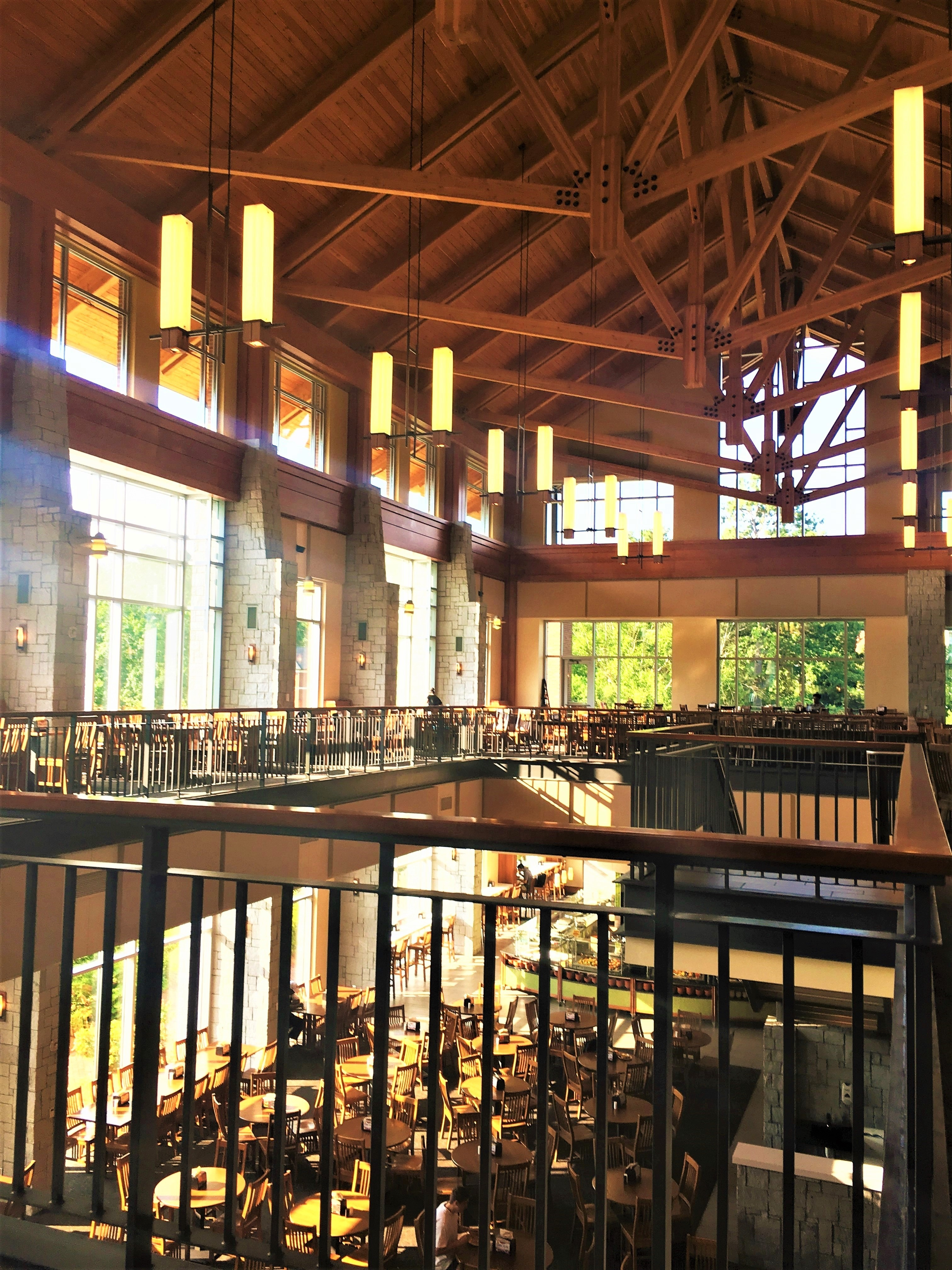
Bolton Dining Commons

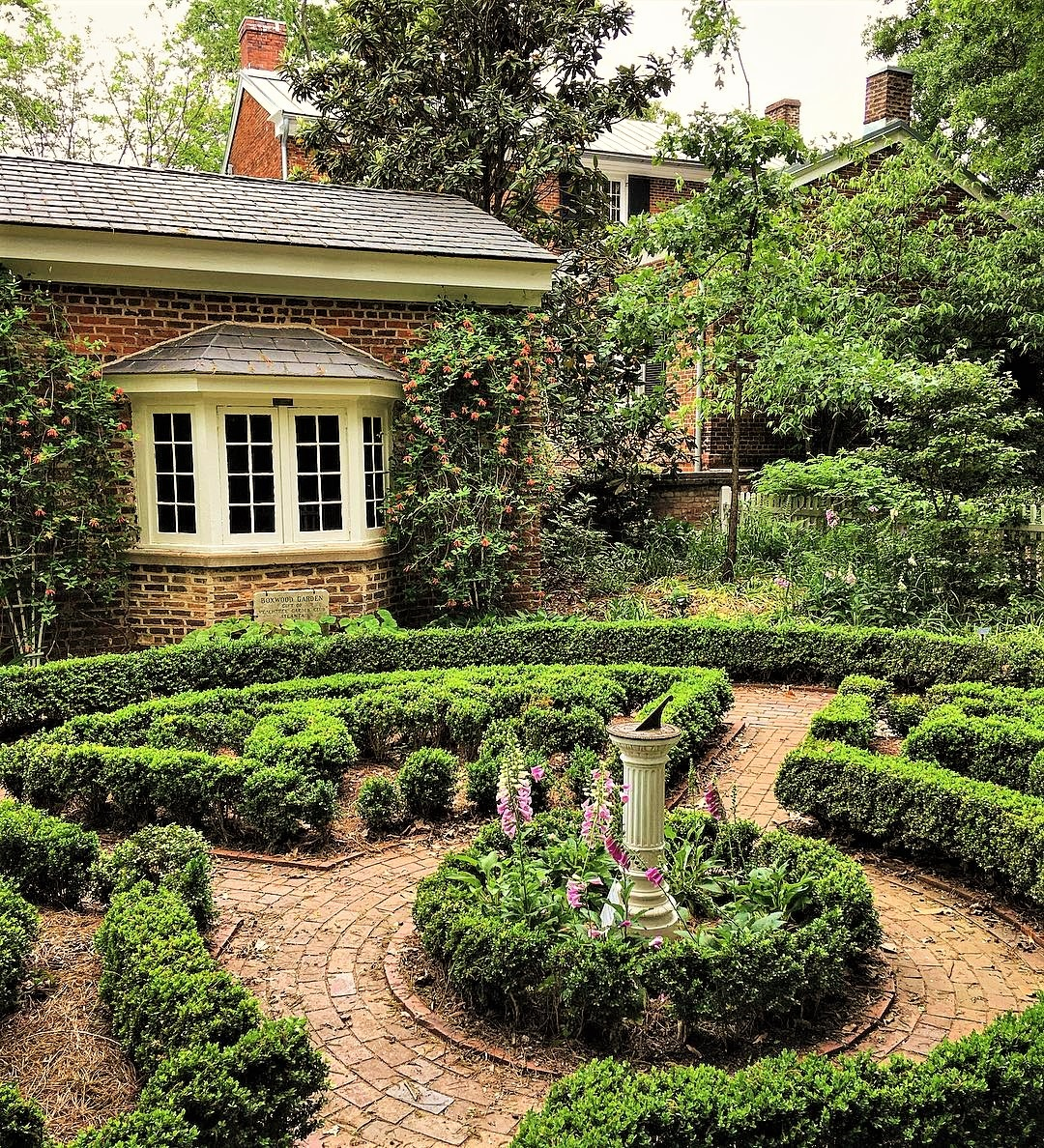
Founders Memorial Garden

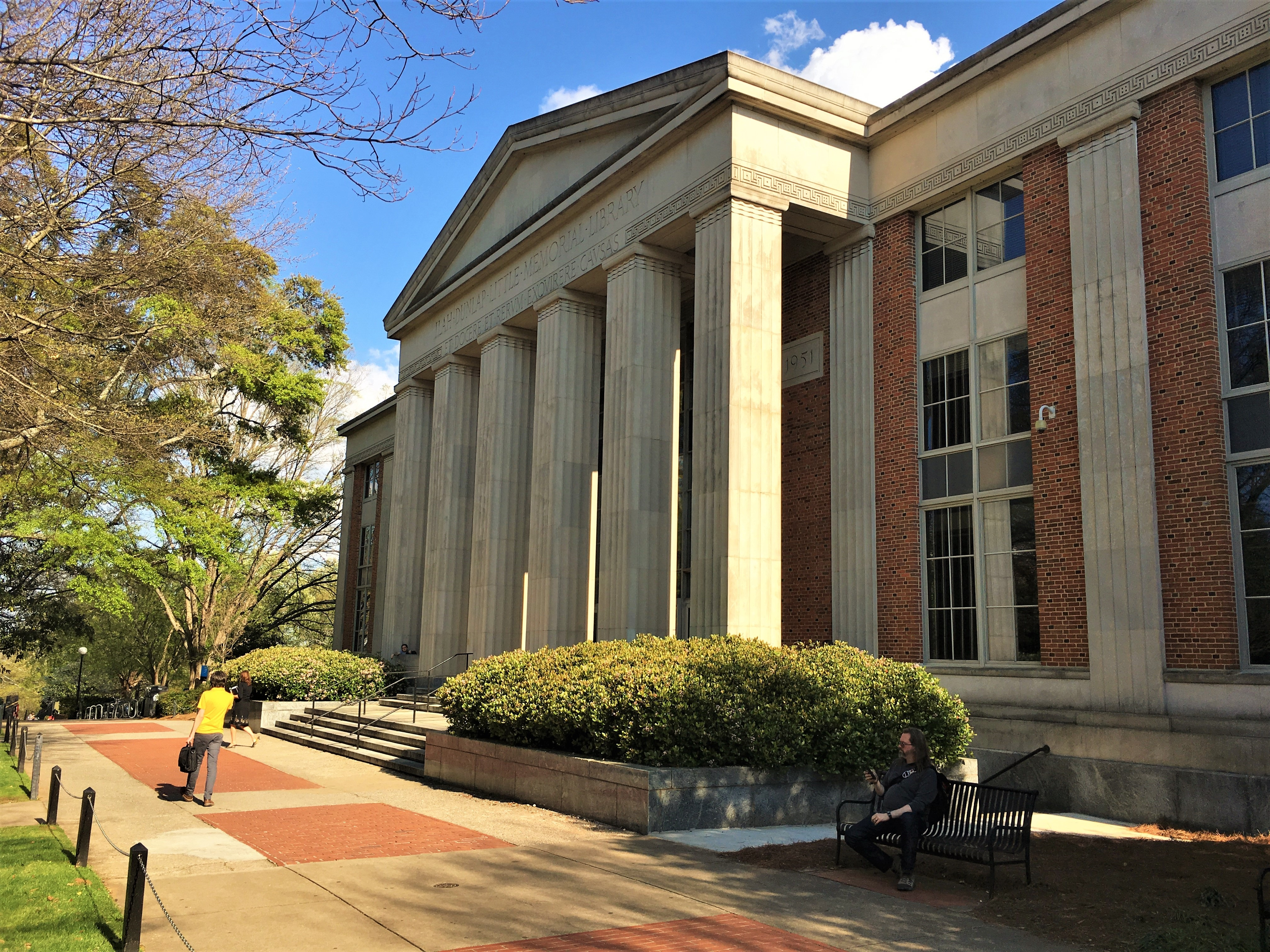
Ilah Dunlap Little Library

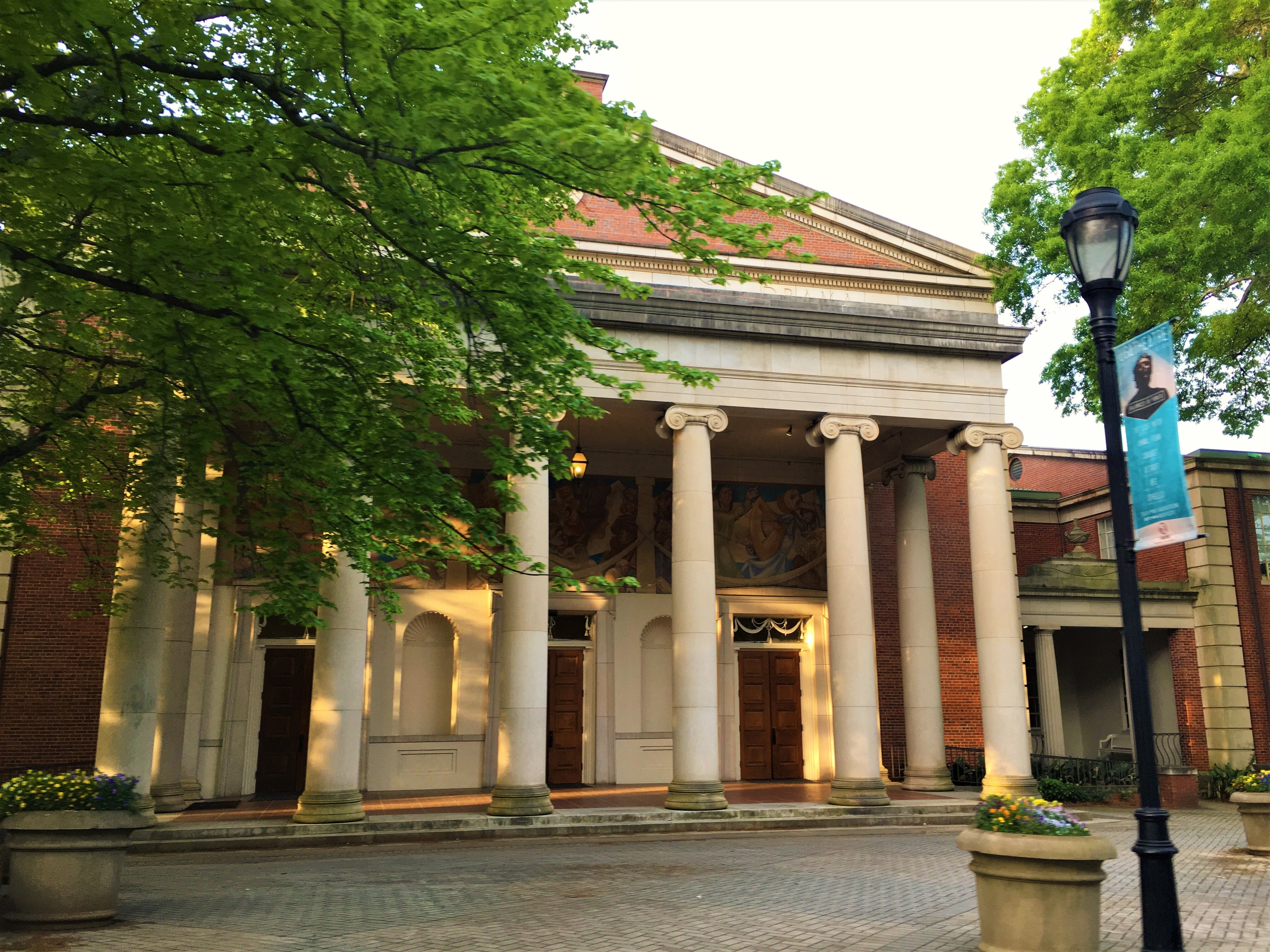
Fine Arts Building UGA

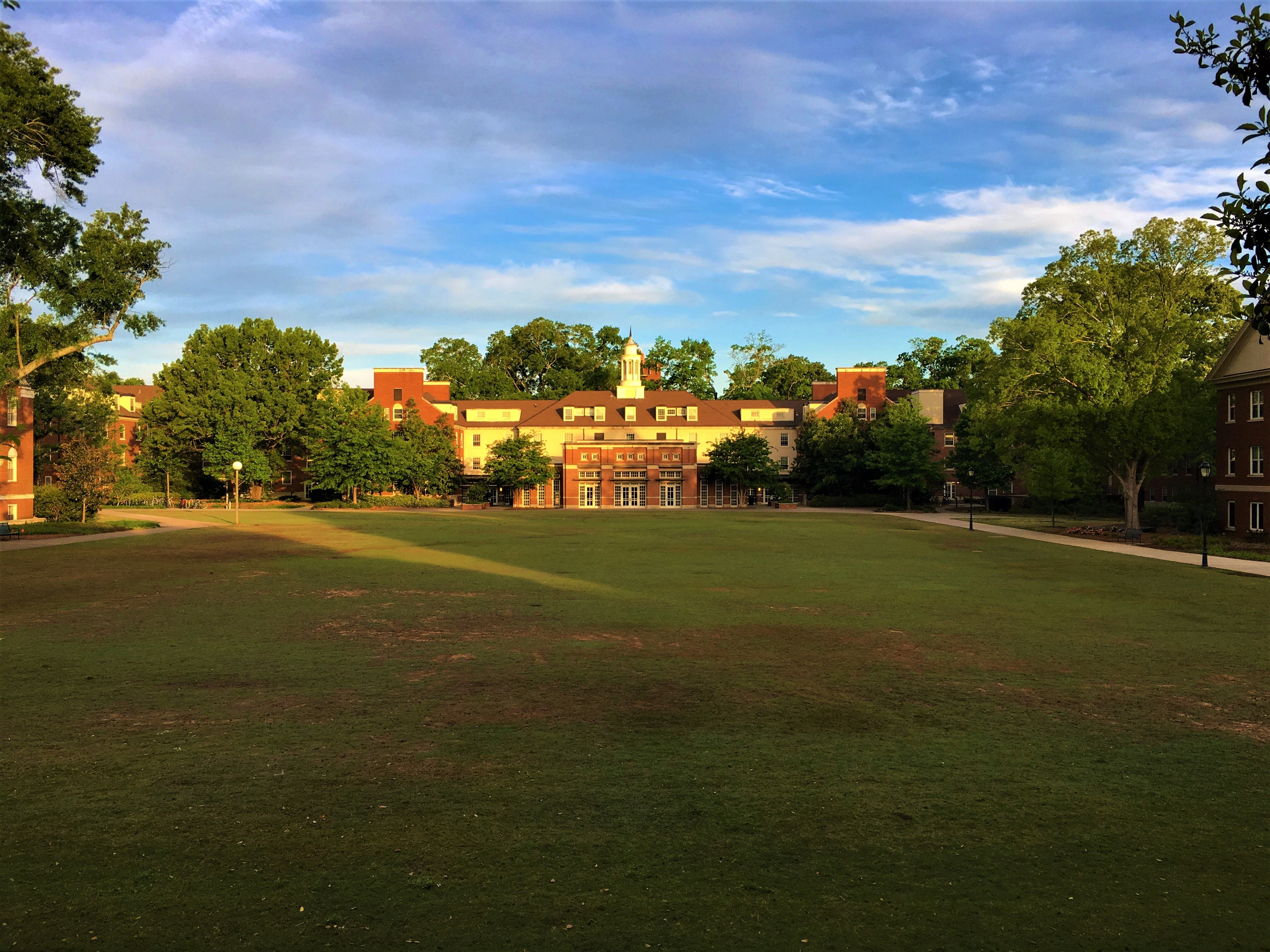
Myers Quad

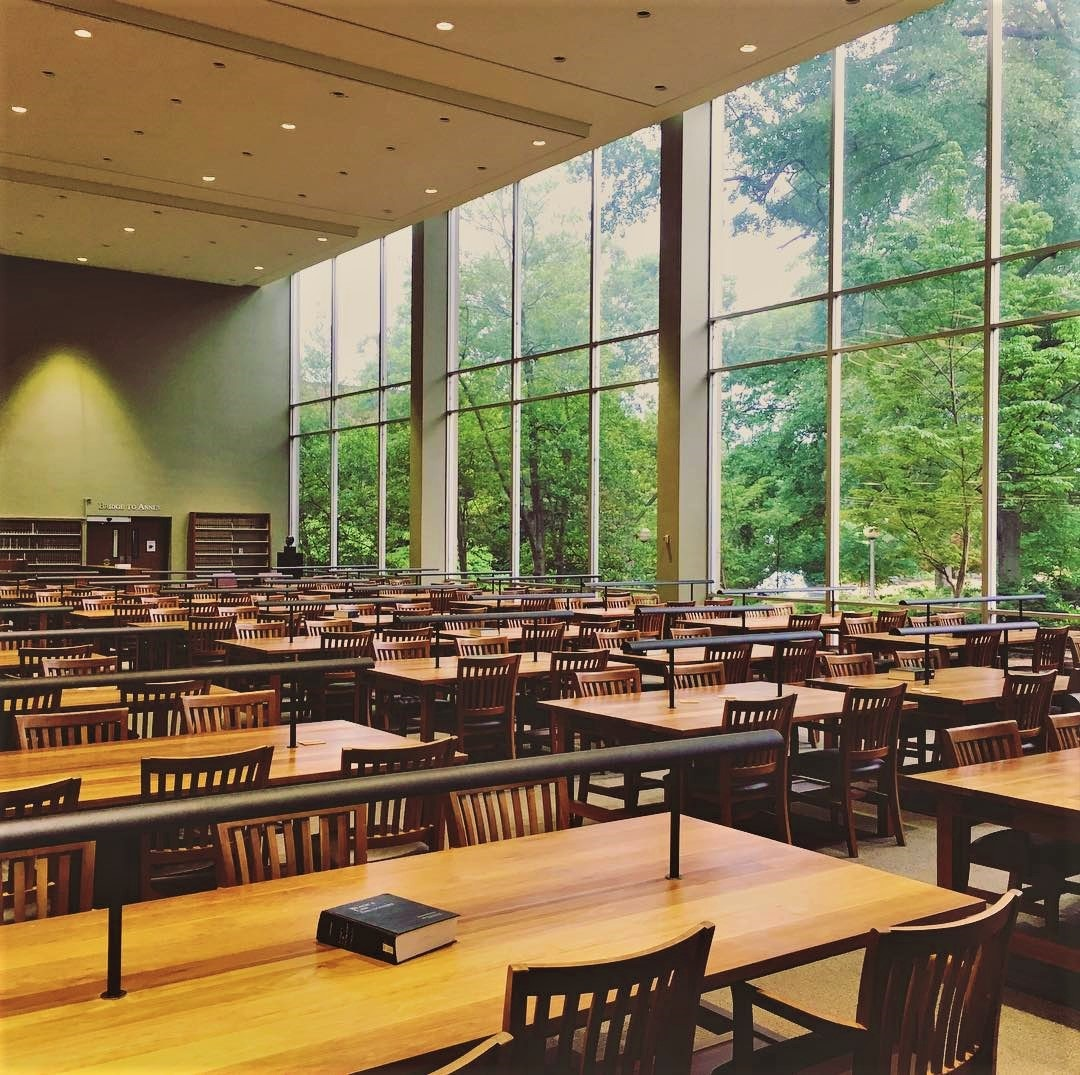
University of Georgia Law Library

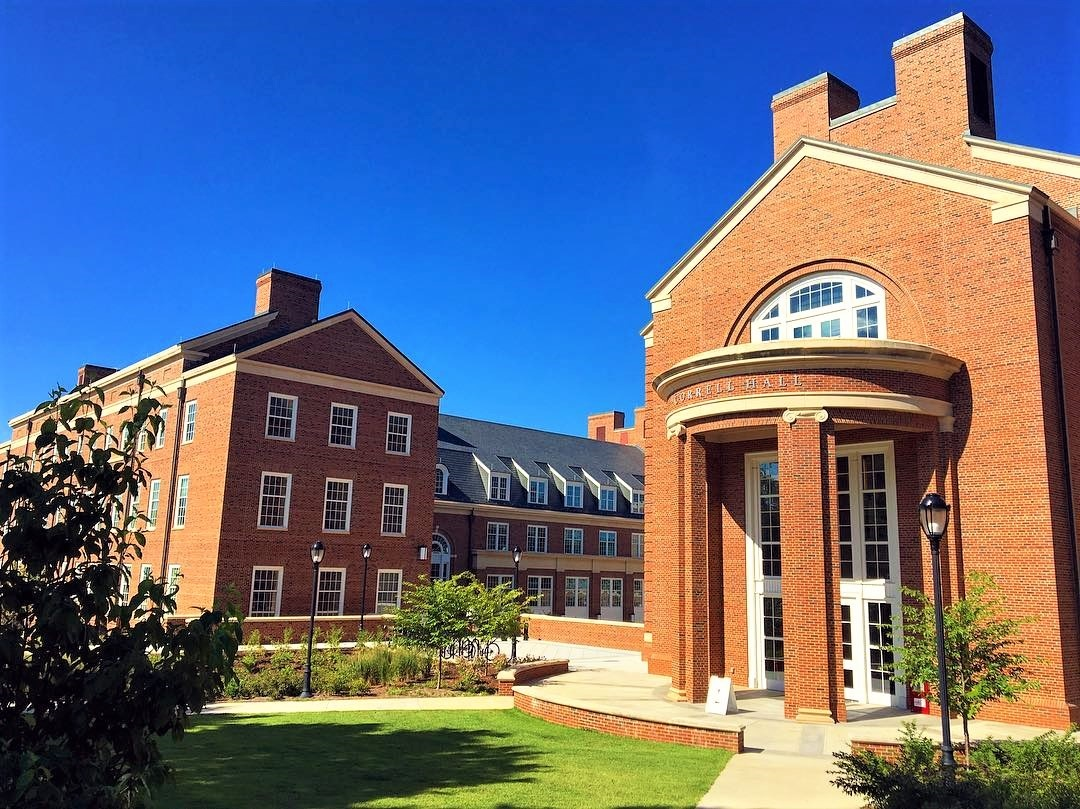
Terry College of Business

A notable North Campus fixture is the cast-iron gateway that stands at its main entrance. Known as "The Arch" (but often erroneously pluralized to "The Arches"), the structure was patterned after the Seal of the State of Georgia, and has faced historic downtown Athens ever since it was erected in the 1850s. Although the Seal's three pillars represent the state's three branches of government, the pillars of The Arch are usually taken to represent the Georgia Constitution's three principles of wisdom, justice, and moderation, which are engraved over the pillars of the Seal. There is a superstition about walking through The Arch. It is said that if you walk under The Arch as an undergraduate student, you will not graduate from the University of Georgia on time. Another legend claims that should you walk through The Arch as a freshman, you will become sterile. The steps lining The Arch are noticeably worn due to students avoiding walking under The Arch.

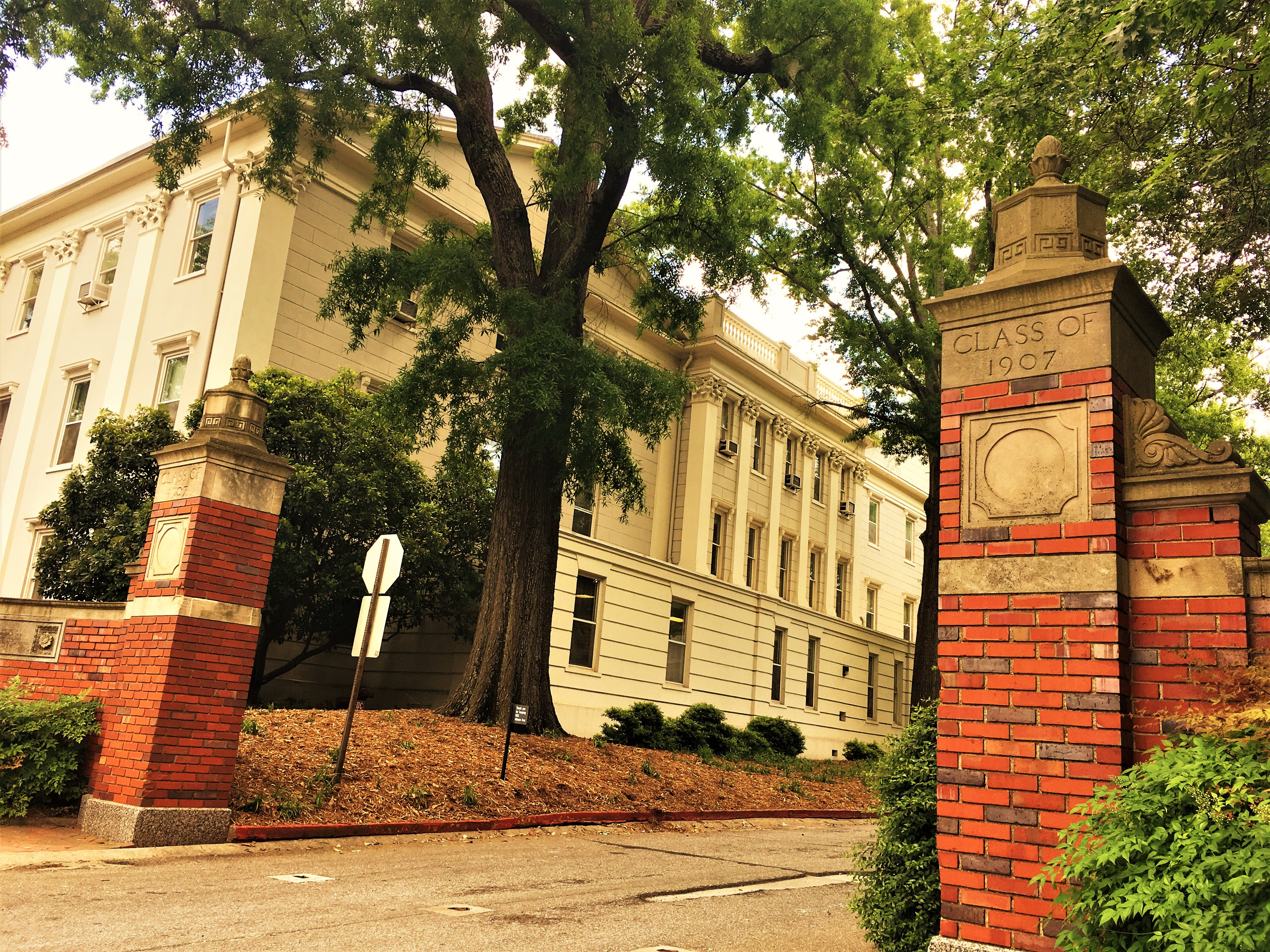
Class of 1907 campus entrance.

Dividing North and South Campus is the "central campus" area, home of the University Bookstore, Tate Student Center, and Miller Learning Center, as well as Sanford Stadium, home of the football team. Adjacent to the stadium is a bridge that crosses Tanyard Creek and is the traditional crossover into South Campus, home of most of the science and agricultural classroom buildings. Further south and east, across East Campus Road, is East Campus, home of the Ramsey Center, the East Campus Village (apartment-style dormitories), and several fine arts facilities, including the Georgia Museum of Art and the Hugh Hodgson School of Music. A new facility for the art school opened its doors in the Fall of 2008. This new state-of-the-art facility replaced the elder that was placed on North Campus.

Adjacent to the campus is the "west campus" area. This extends from the corner of Britain Avenue and Lumpkin Street in the south to Waddell and Wray streets in the north. It is bordered along the east by Lumpkin Street and on the west by Church Street south of Baxter Street and Florida Avenue to the north. Located on the south end are several dormitories including the Hill Community, Oglethorpe House, Creswell Hall, Brumby Hall and Russell Hall. Also located here are Legion Field and Pool, which are recreational facilities.

In 2011, the University of Georgia acquired the former U.S. Navy Supply Corps School on the medical corridor of Prince Avenue near downtown Athens. The two primary occupants of the 56-acre Health Sciences Campus are the AU-UGA Medical Partnership and the UGA College of Public Health. The campus has an extensive landscaped green space, more than 400 trees and several historic buildings. The majority of classes for both medical and public health students are held in Russell Hall, not to be confused with the South campus undergraduate residence hall, which was built in 1974. The nearly 63,000 square-foot building includes rooms for small group and clinical skills teaching, a lab for gross anatomy, pathology and histology, a medical library, faculty offices, and classroom space. The AU-UGA Medical Partnership administrative offices are housed in Winnie Davis Hall, which was built in 1902. In 2013, it was announced that St. Mary's Hospital, Northeast Georgia Health System and Athens Regional Medical Center would be utilized as teaching hospitals and residency sites for the Medical Partnership students. The College of Public Health's administrative offices are housed in Rhodes Hall, which was built in 1906. Six of the College's seven units are now located on the Health Sciences Campus, including the Institute of Gerontology in Hudson Hall, the Department of Epidemiology and Biostatistics in B.S. Miller Hall, and Departments of Health Policy and Management and Health Promotion and Behavior in Wright Hall.

=== Ramsey Student Center ===
The Ramsey Student Center is the student recreational and athletic facility located on East Campus. The Ramsey Center is one of the largest student athletic recreation facilities in the United States. It was built and named in honor of Bernard and Eugenia Ramsey. The campus's eight-acre Ramsey Student Center for Physical Activities has two gyms, three pools (one Olympic-sized, a 17-foot (5.2 m) diving well, and a lap pool), a 1/8 mile indoor suspended rubberized track, a 44 feet (13 m)-high climbing wall, 14-foot (4.3 m) outdoor bouldering wall, ten racquetball courts, two squash courts, bicycle repair stands, eight full-length basketball courts, and 19,000 square feet (1,770 m^{2}) of weight-training space. The Ramsey Center also contains the Gabrielsen Natatorium that is home to the university's varsity swimming and diving programs and seats almost 2,000 spectators.

This $40-million structure was named by Sports Illustrated as the best recreational sports facility in the country for the year 1997. Men's Fitness named UGA as one of the 25 fittest colleges in America.

=== Franklin Residential College ===
Franklin Residential College (FRC) is a residential college, based on the Oxford and Cambridge model. It is a collaboration of the Franklin College of Arts and Sciences, the University Housing office, and the Vice President of Instruction. It was founded in 2000. The home of the college is Rutherford Hall, which was built in the late 1930s.

Students in the Franklin College of Arts and Sciences may apply for a space at the FRC during the spring semester of every year. Members are admitted by a committee of current students on the basis of their interest in and commitment to participating in the community of a residential college. A faculty family also lives in Rutherford Hall in the apartment located on the first floor. The faculty family regularly hosts students in their apartment for special events. The residence family works together with the senior dean to develop programs and activities for the students involved in the FRC.

=== Tate Student Center and the Tate II expansion ===
On April 19, 2007, ground was officially broken for the $52 million Tate Student Center Expansion and Renovation project. A multi-level parking deck began the first phase of the construction on which the new Student Center was built. Tate II officially opened its doors on June 1, 2009.

Included in the new student center is: an 11,000-square-foot (1,000 m^{2}) multi-purpose space on the fifth floor, a dining room, meeting rooms, and lounge seating on the fourth floor, a food court, retail space, Print & Copy Services, a large lounge area, gaming area, and open performance space on the third floor. The new food court is operated by UGA Food Services. It includes Hotei's, a hibachi-style grill, Red Clay Cafe @ Tate, and Barberitos. Some of the amenities, such as the Bulldog Cafe and the Tate Theatre, will remain in the old Tate Center. The total cost of the new expansion is approximately $58.2 million. The building is LEED certified. Construction on the $13.5 million, 500-space Tate Student Center parking deck was underway through May 2009.

=== Lamar Dodd School of Art Building ===
Construction on the $39.2-million, 171,000 sq ft (15,900 m^{2}) Lamar Dodd School of Art was underway through spring 2008. The site is just south of the existing Performing and Visual Arts Complex on East Campus. In 2012, the College of Environmental Design's $10.4 million Visual Arts building became the first UGA building to incorporate a water reclamation system and it became the first UGA building to utilize solar harvesting technology. The building is LEED certified.

=== Zell B. Miller Learning Center ===
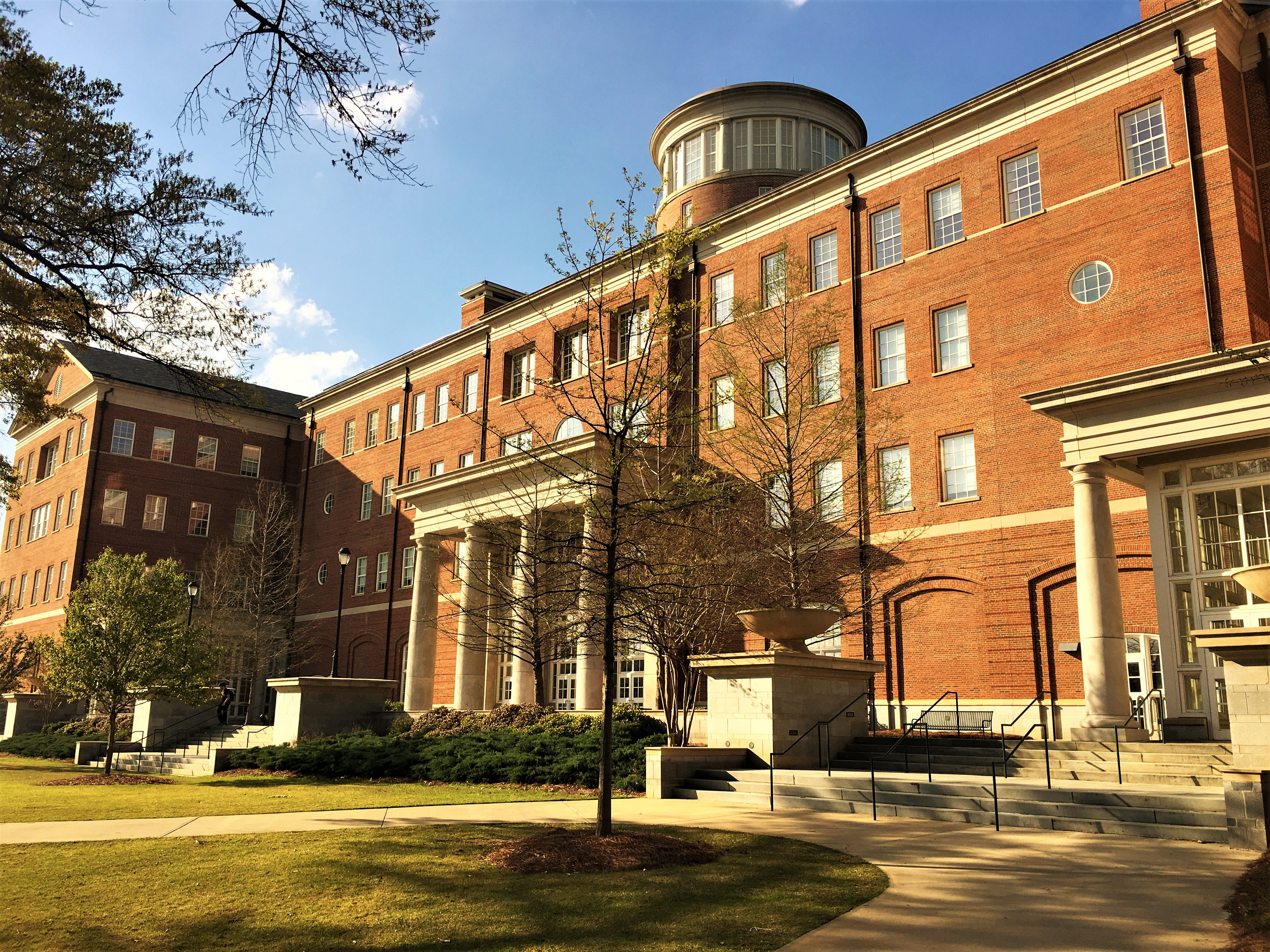
Miller Learning Center

The $43.6 million Zell B. Miller Learning Center (MLC) has been the largest academic building on the University of Georgia campus since its opening in the autumn of 2003 when it was called the Student Learning Center (SLC). Located at the heart of the UGA campus, it houses both classroom space and library space in close proximity.

On the inside is a technological space that includes two dozen classrooms capable of seating 2,400 students and equipped with the latest technology. The building serves as an expansion of UGA library services, with a completely electronic library, 276,000 sq ft (25,600 m^{2}) of actual floor space. The center houses Advanced Learning Labs dedicated to instruction in electronic research sources, information literacy skills, software applications, and faculty development, as well as faculty rest areas and meeting spaces. The learning center also includes an art gallery by Venezuelan-born painter Patricia Van Dalen.

=== Georgia Museum of Art ===
The Georgia Museum of Art is an academic museum at the University of Georgia and the state of Georgia's official art museum. Located on UGA's East Campus since 1996, it houses a collection of nearly 10,000 works of art, including American paintings, works by self-taught artists, decorative arts, works by African American artists, a Kress Study Collection of Italian Renaissance and Baroque paintings and one of the largest and finest collections of works on paper (prints, drawings, watercolors, photographs, and more) in the Southeast. Admission is always free, as are almost all events the museum organizes. Its staff collaborate regularly with UGA faculty all over campus to organize temporary exhibitions and accommodate classes for tours and behind-the-scenes research.

=== Georgia Museum of Natural History ===
The Georgia Museum of Natural History provides Joshua Laerm Academic Support Awards annually. The awards are named after Dr. Joshua Laerm a professor at the University of Georgia who died in 1997.

=== Richard B. Russell Special Collections Libraries ===
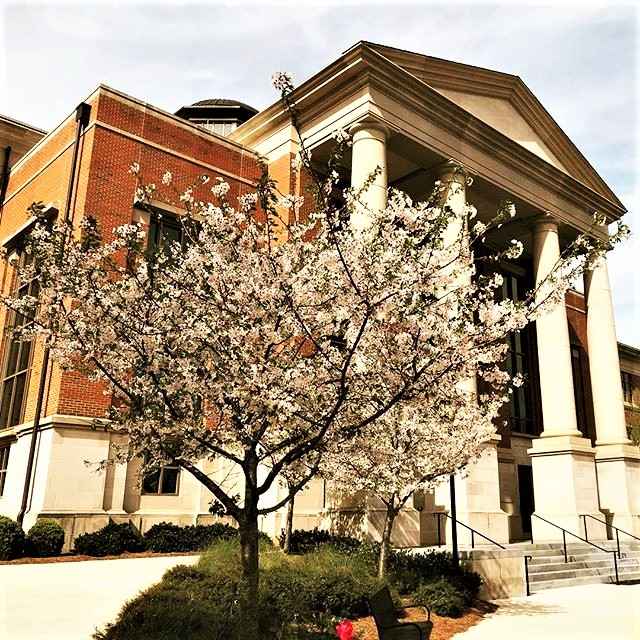
Richard B. Russell Jr. Special Collections Libraries Building

The $46-million libraries building, named in honor of former senator and governor Richard Russell Jr., who spent a half-century in public service, houses the Hargrett Rare Book and Manuscript Library, the Walter J. Brown Media Archives, the Peabody Awards Collection, and the Richard B. Russell Library for Political Research and Studies. UGA has partnered with the Digital Public Library of America, an ambitious project to make the nation's archives digital, searchable and freely accessible. The Special Collections Library is not to be confused with the Alexander Campbell King Law Library which is the law library of the University of Georgia School of Law. The Alexander Campbell King Law Library is located on North Campus.

The Hargrett Rare Book and Manuscript Library The Hargrett Rare Book and Manuscript Library, a leading repository on history and culture, holds 200,000 volumes in its rare book and Georgiana collections, 6 million pages of historical manuscripts and photographs, along with maps, broadsides, and two centuries worth of UGA archives and records. Other areas of emphasis at the Hargrett Library include performing arts and natural history. Holdings date from the 15th century to the present.

The Richard B. Russell Library for Political Research and Studies The Richard B. Russell Library for Political Research and Studies is a political archives and center for the research and study of politics and public policy with an emphasis on the role of the U.S. Congress. It maintains over 150 collections and is one of three special collections at the University of Georgia dedicated to preserving and providing access to a variety of archival materials in all formats that document a wide array of subject matter. The Russell Library is not the official name of the main library of which it is a part. The official name of the main library at UGA is Ilah Dunlap Little Library.

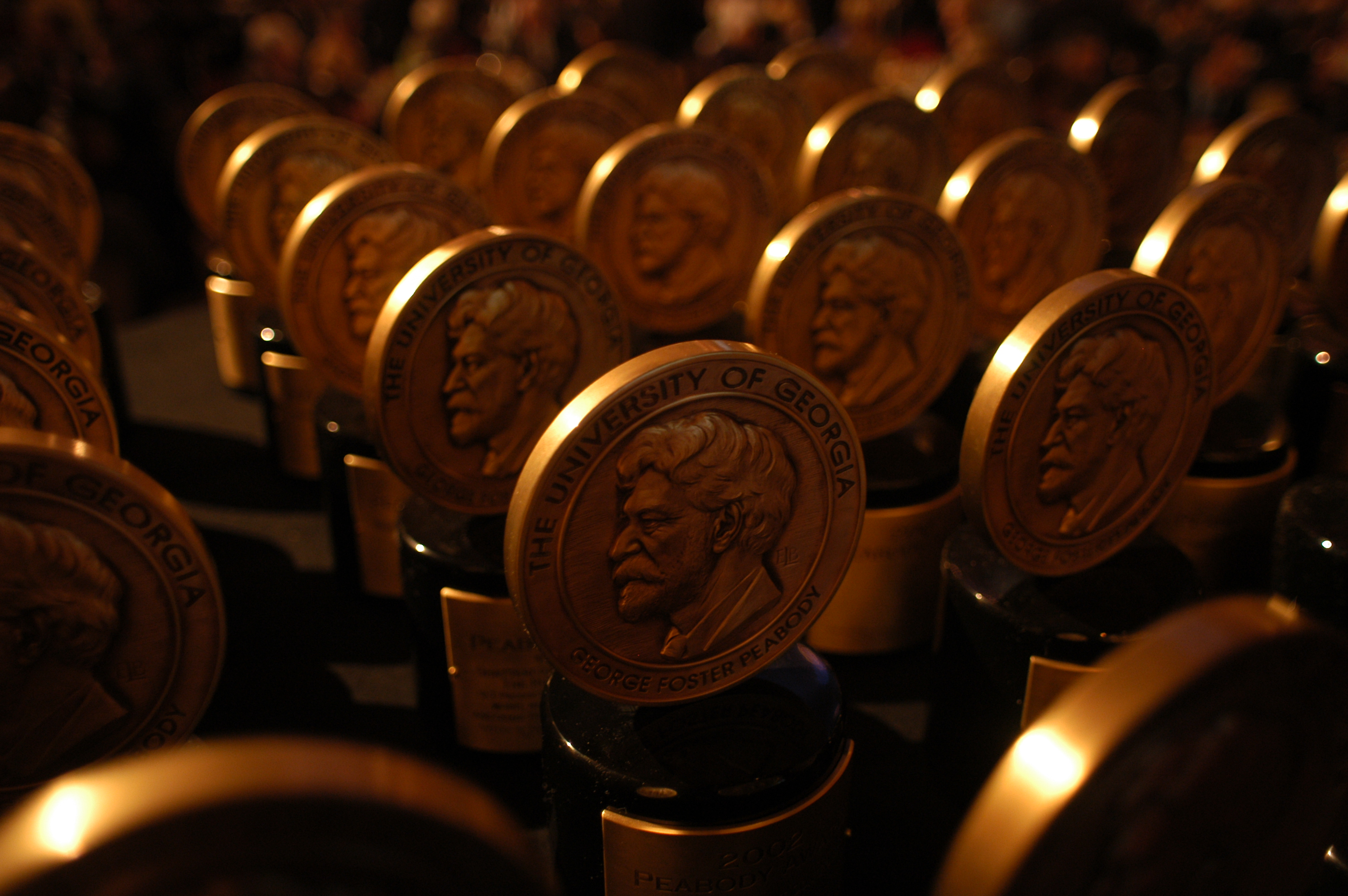
The annual Peabody Awards is administered by the Grady College of Journalism and Mass Communication.

The Walter J. Brown Media Archives & Peabody Awards Collection The Walter J. Brown Media Archives & Peabody Awards Collection was started in 1995 and preserves over 250,000 titles in film, video, audiotape, transcription disks, and other recording formats dating from the 1920s to the present. The archives are housed in the Richard B. Russell Building Special Collections Libraries on the northwest part of the University of Georgia campus. The Peabody Awards Collection is the flagship of the archives collection, and contains nearly every entry for the first major broadcast award given in the United States. The judging for the Peabody Awards is conducted by the Peabody Awards Office in the Grady College of Journalism and Mass Communication from a panel of distinguished television scholars, critics, and media professionals. The award ceremony is held every year in New York City in late spring.

=== The Georgia Review ===
The Georgia Review is a literary journal founded at University of Georgia in 1947. The Review features poetry, fiction, essays, reviews, and visual art. It won National Magazine Awards for Fiction in 1986 and for Essays in 2007 and has been an NMA nominee nineteen times. Works that appear in the Georgia Review are frequently reprinted in the Best American Short Stories and The Best American Poetry and have won the Pushcart Prize and O. Henry Award.

=== University of Georgia Press ===
The University of Georgia Press is a scholarly publishing house for the University System of Georgia. It is one of the oldest and largest publishing academic publishing houses in the nation, and has been one of 130 full members of the prestigious Association of American University Presses since 1940. Employing 24 full-time publishing professionals, the Press publishes 80-85 new books a year and has more than 1500 titles in print. The Press published each year scholarly, academic, and literary works. It is also a leading publisher of African-American studies, civil rights history, and environmental studies. The Flannery O'Connor Award for Short Fiction was established in 1983 to recognize gifted young writers. The Press is also a long-time publisher of creative writing through books published in conjunction with the Flannery O'Connor Award for Short Fiction, the Association of Writers & Writing Programs, Associated Writers and Writing Programs Award for Creative Nonfiction, and other literary competitions and series. The publishing program has been nationally recognized, and in recent years a number of books published by the Press have won major awards.

=== The State Botanical Garden of Georgia ===
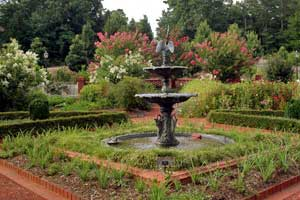
A fountain in the State Botanical Garden of Georgia

The State Botanical Garden of Georgia is a 313-acre preserve set aside by the University of Georgia in 1968 for the study and enjoyment of plants and nature. Located three miles south of campus, it is a living laboratory serving educational, research, recreational, and public service roles for the University of Georgia and the citizens. The garden contains a number of specialized theme gardens and collections, over five miles of nature trails, and four major facilities including a tropical conservatory.

=== University of Georgia Campus and Thomas Mill Forest Arboreta ===
The University of Georgia Campus Arboretum is an arboretum located across the campus in Athens. Today's Campus Arboretum is organized into three walking tours through the North, Central, and South Campus. A free booklet provides maps and tree identification, and more than 150 campus trees are marked by plaques corresponding to the booklet. There are 45 species of trees on the North Campus, the President's Club Garden and the Latin American Ethnobotanical Garden. The President's Club Garden recognizes those who gave $10,000 or greater to the University of Georgia. Their names are inscribed on the plaques that line the brick walls. The Latin American Ethnobotanical Garden is located at the southeast corner of Baldwin Hall, near the corner of Baldwin Street and East Campus Road. It highlights plants of cultural significance in Latin America and focuses attention on the critical need for conservation of this biodiversity.

The Campus Arboretum should not be confused with State Arboretum of Georgia, deeded as a gift to, and also operated by, the University of Georgia, but located in the Northeast Georgia Mountains at the Thompson Mills Forest, Braselton, Georgia. This arboretum features 330 acres with granite outcrop, the Lee Creek Native Tree Trail, the Pinetum Trail, and the seven-acre Evan Thompson Thornton Memorial Garden (30-minute self-guided walk). Groups are welcome, the forest is open year-round weekdays, guides can be made available, though there are self-guided tours, and parking is on site. The university's Warnell School of Forestry and Natural Resources uses the forest and environs in its goal to prepare leaders in the conservation and sustainable management of forests and other renewable natural resources using the latest ideas and technology for real world applications.

=== Paul D. Coverdell Center for Biomedical and Health Sciences ===
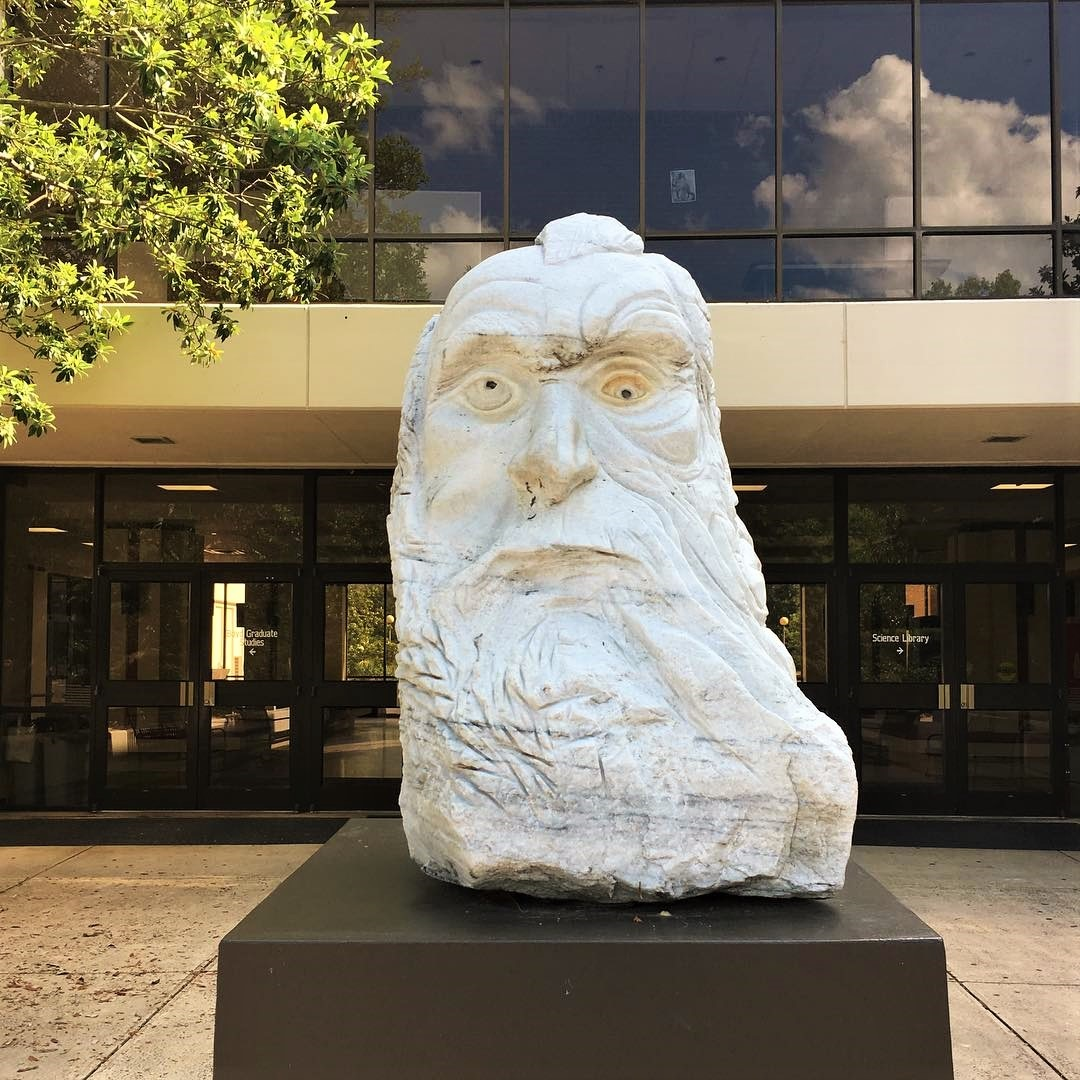
Godwin sculpture by artist Mel Chin outside the Science Library. One side of the head represents Charles Darwin; the other side is God as depicted in the Sistine Chapel.

Named after U.S. Senator Paul D. Coverdell, this $30-million facility totals 140,000 square feet (13,000 m^{2}), giving enough room for 25 research teams or roughly 275 scientists, staff and graduate students. The center was designed mainly to maximize energy efficiency. Laboratory intensive groups at the Coverdell Center include the Center for Tropical and Emerging Global Diseases (CTEGD), the Developmental Biology Group (DBG), and the Bio-Imaging Research Center (BIRC), the Health and Risk Communications Group (HRCG), the administrative homes of the College of Public Health (CPH), the Biomedical Health Sciences Institute (BHSI), and the CPH's Department of Health Administration, Biostatistics and Epidemiology. Former President George H. W. Bush spoke at the Center's grand opening in 2006.

=== The University of Georgia Observatory ===
The University of Georgia Observatory is located on top of the Physics Building on the UGA campus. The observatory hosts colloquia, seminars, research groups, and open houses in addition to being utilized in undergraduate and graduate courses. The observatory is also the home of the Center for Simulational Physics, the Nanoscale Science and Engineering Center and the MRI Physics Lab. In 2013, UGA and Franklin College of Arts and Sciences became the first university to have a star-system named after it. The Kepler mission, NASA's first mission capable of finding Earth-size planets, confirmed in 2012 the existence of three new planets in the system known as Kepler-37. This year, NASA authorized the nickname designation of this planetary system as UGA-1785, 1785 for the year the University of Georgia was founded. Roger C. Hunter, a Franklin College alumnus, presented the letter of conformation to then Franklin College dean Allan Dorsey during a visit to campus. Hunter noted the name to be given to this particular star system due to light captured by the Kepler telescope began its journey towards Earth in 1801 – the same year Franklin College was founded.

=== The University of Georgia Golf Course ===
Developed in 1968, the course operates under the Division of Auxiliary Services. The University of Georgia is the only institution of higher education that owns and operates its own PGA Tour co-sanctioned professional golf tournament. Multiple men's and women's Southeastern Conference Championships and three NCAA Women's Championships have been played on the University Golf Course. The course also hosted one of the Men's NCAA Regional Tournaments in 2012. The University of Georgia Golf Course is a public golf course and is available to students, faculty, staff, and alumni, as well as the general public. The golf course was renovated in 2006. The Masters Tournament is held in nearby Augusta, Georgia.

=== J.W. Fanning Institute for Leadership Development ===
Founded in 1982, the Fanning Institute is named for Vice President and Professor Emeritus J.W. Fanning, who many consider to be the "father of leadership" in Georgia. The J.W. Fanning Institute provides training in four categories: adult leadership development, youth leadership development, nonprofit and organizational development, and conflict resolution. The Fanning Institute is partnered with the Athens Area Community Foundation and The Orange Duffel Bag Foundation.

=== Carl Vinson Institute of Government ===
The institute has helped government leaders navigate change and forge strong directions. The institute is a unit of the Office of Public Service and Outreach at the University of Georgia, and offers training programs for public officials and staff, conducts research on a broad range of questions relevant to governments, and provides assistance to help those governments and agencies run more efficiently and effectively.

== University of Georgia Atlanta and Gwinnett campuses ==
The UGA Atlanta/Buckhead campus consists of the 38,000-square-foot Terry Executive Education Center, which is a satellite location of the Terry College of Business.

The UGA Gwinnett Campus moved to its current building in Lawrenceville in 2008.

== University of Georgia 4-H service centers ==
The University of Georgia operates five 4-H centers around the state of Georgia: Fortson 4-H Center, in the southern metro Atlanta area, Jekyll Island 4-H Center and Tybee Island 4-H Center on the Georgia coast, Rock Eagle 4-H Center in Eatonton, Georgia, and Wahsega 4-H Center, in the North Georgia mountains. The university is also responsible for two other land holdings. These centers, operated in part by the University of Georgia College of Agricultural and Environmental Sciences, serve as educational facilitates for youth. Georgia 4-H specializes in educating young people about agricultural and environmental issues, agriculture awareness, leadership, communication skills, foods and nutrition, health, energy conservation, and citizenship. The 4-H centers also operate several summer camps for young people. The total usage of the 4-H facilities in FY 2001 was 95,995 people, of this total 59,180 elementary, middle and high school students participated in 4-H-sponsored events or activities. Many of the other user groups are related to various University of Georgia, University of Georgia Cooperative Extension Service, Board of Regents and other educational conferences throughout the year.

== UGA Marine Extension Service & Skidaway Institute of Oceanography ==
The University of Georgia Marine Extension Service (UGA MAREX) consists of several educational outreach facilities in the state of Georgia, including one on the Skidaway Marine Science Campus. The Marine Education Center and Aquarium (MECA) operates a small public saltwater aquarium of local marine fish and invertebrates, which is visited by 18,000 schoolchildren per year. There is also a small research facility for shellfish aquaculture.

Skidaway Institute of Oceanography is a marine science research institute located on the northern end of Skidaway Island near Savannah, Georgia. In 2012, the Skidaway Institute became a part of the University of Georgia. The institute is used by researchers and students from around the world, including by researchers and students from the University of Georgia and the Georgia Institute of Technology.
