= University of Georgia Campus Arboretum =

Arboretum in Athens, Georgia, USA

- Interactive map of University of Georgia Campus Arboretum
- Location: Athens, Georgia
- Coordinates: 33°57′04″N 83°22′19″W
- Operator: University of Georgia
- Open: Dawn to dusk
- Status: Open all year
- Website: UGA campus arboretum

The University of Georgia Campus Arboretum is an arboretum located across the University of Georgia campus in Athens, Georgia. It is open daily without charge.

Today's arboretum is the third near campus. The first was established by Malthus Ward in 1833 next to his home at 126 Dearing Street, which then faced to the east on Finley Street. The garden was within the area between Finley, Reese, Pope, and both sides of Broad Street. Although the garden was sold in 1856, and the proceeds used to pay for the iron fence around UGA's north campus, it is possible that some of the trees and their offspring continue to live in the area. A historic marker was erected in 2013 to commemorate the garden.

The second (early 1900s) was on south campus, and a few trees remain of it near the Georgia Center of Continuing Education.

The current arboretum is organized into three walking tours through the North, Central, and South Campus. A free booklet provides maps and tree identification, and more than 150 campus trees are marked by plaques corresponding to the booklet.

The campus arboretum should not be confused with Georgia's state arboretum, also operated by the university but located in Thompson Mills Forest, Braselton, Georgia. It is also distinct from the State Botanical Garden of Georgia, organized in 1968 as the university's third botanical garden, and located off campus.

== See also ==
- List of botanical gardens and arboretums in Georgia (U.S. state)
