= Fred Hamilton Rhododendron Garden =

Protected garden in Georgia, United States

Coordinates: 34°58′02.34″N 83°46′15.03″W

Hamilton Gardens at Lake Chatuge
- Founded: January 1, 2016; 10 years ago
- Dissolved: December 2021
- Type: Educational 501(c)(3)
- Tax ID no.: 47-1388717
- Location: 96 Pavilion Road, Hiawassee, Georgia 30546
- Region served: Georgia
- Key people: Grace Howard, Executive Director
- Employees: 2
- Volunteers: 100+
- Website: hamiltongardens.org
- Formerly called: Fred Hamilton Rhododendron Garden

- Location within the state of Georgia
- Location: Towns County, Georgia, USA
- Nearest city: Hiawassee, Georgia
- Area: 33.0 acres (13.4 ha)
- Established: 1982; 44 years ago
- Named for: Hazel and Fred Hamilton
- Visitors: 5,000 (in 2021)
- Operator: Georgia Mountain Fair, Inc.
- Owner: Towns County, Georgia
- Administrator: Catherine Luckenbach
- Website: Hamilton Rhododendron Gardens

Hamilton Rhododendron Gardens is the only public botanical garden in the Blue Ridge Mountains of North Georgia specializing in Rhododendrons and Native Azaleas. The protected area encompasses 33.0 acres (13.4 ha) on land sloping to Lake Chatuge. Hamilton Gardens at Lake Chatuge, Inc. was a 501(c)(3) non-profit educational organization that successfully restored the garden and operated it for six years. Located near the city of Hiawassee, Georgia, the gardens have the largest collection of native azalea and rhododendron in the Southeast U.S.

== History ==
It is also known as Fred Hamilton Rhododendron Gardens, Hamilton Gardens, Fred Hamilton Gardens and Hamilton Gardens at Georgia Mountain Fairgrounds, and is not to be confused with the famous Hamilton Gardens in New Zealand.

=== Fred Hamilton ===
Fred Russell Hamilton was born in Raleigh, North Carolina during 1913. He graduated from the University of North Carolina in 1936 and went to work for Sears, Roebuck and Company as an auditor. Hamilton married the former Hazel Hampton in 1940. They had one son, born in 1944. The couple loved native azaleas and rhododendrons and during Fred's frequent travels, they collected specimens from locations around the globe and propagated many varieties in their greenhouse. Mr. Hamilton was an American Rhododendron Society member for many years and developed the first domestic yellow azalea, Rhododendron flammeum, which he named after his wife. The family also enjoyed the mountains and acquired a vacation home in Towns County, Georgia.

Hazel Hamilton Azalea

He remained with Sears for his entire career, becoming a company executive and living in Atlanta before retiring in 1978. The Hamilton’s knew the day would come when they could no longer manage the huge gardens they had so lovingly created. In an effort to preserve the plants and save them from eventually being destroyed, their goal was to give their entire collection of rhododendrons and native azaleas to the people of Towns County, if a suitable location could be found. Fred Hamilton discovered the perfect spot at the Georgia Mountain Fairgrounds campus on a peninsula surrounded by Lake Chatuge. The location had recently opened after the Tennessee Valley Authority gifted the land to Towns County for a park. In 1981, the Hamiltons donated over one thousand cultivars (most of the plants from their two properties) for transplanting into Hamilton Gardens, which opened the following year.

=== Operation ===
Fred Hamilton's donation was based on an agreement that the board of the Georgia Mountain Fairgrounds and the Towns County Lions Club would utilize their volunteers to maintain and improve the gardens. Unfortunately, over the years, fewer people volunteered to work and the plants were not cared for properly. Most monetary donations to the gardens were used by the cash-strapped fairgrounds for their expenses.

=== Renovation ===
In the mid-2000s, Paul Hansen was hired as garden curator and Catherine Hansen, his wife, managed the garden shop. Conditions in the garden improved and a grant was secured from the American Rhododendron Society to renovate the Garden Shop and greenhouses, originally constructed in the 1980s. A ribbon-cutting ceremony was held in June 2012 to celebrate the refurbished Hamilton Gardens. The local newspaper stated that profits from plant sales would fund garden projects and restoration. A few years later, a pay dispute between the fair board and Mr. Hansen ended with the departure of the gardener.

=== New vision ===
After the Hansens left, a small group of local master gardeners conceived a vision for Hamilton Gardens that included forming a 501(c)(3) organization, "Hamilton Gardens at Lake Chatuge, Inc." for that purpose. They approached the fair board and offered to take over management and operations as a non-profit. The fair board agreed.

Noel Turner, a former Hamilton Gardens board member described the condition of the gardens in 2016:

"The lack of structural integrity was such that the (125' Rosebay) bridge could have collapsed at any time. Georgia Mountain Fair, TVA and Towns County were exposed to potential liabilities. The Paris Pavilion restrooms were grossly neglected. Commodes leaking or not working, rotten partition walls, peeling paint, broken windows, etc. – an embarrassment to the citizens of Towns County. Improper electrical wiring (reverse polarity) in the greenhouse. One of the garden volunteers was shocked and fortunately not seriously injured. At the time of transition, there were weeds 2+ feet tall in the pathways, areas overtaken by invasive plants, dead trees and limbs throughout the gardens, leaking irrigation, infested hemlocks, etc. Gross negligence is not strong enough to describe the condition of the gardens and structures the Hamilton Gardens Board had to deal with in 2016."

Between 2016 and 2021, the new administrators increased revenues which funded major improvements including pavilion bathrooms, building a new bridge and smaller bridge repairs, a lookout deck at Fishing Rock and constructing a large shed for equipment. The garden's plants received proper care while community awareness, donations and volunteer hours increased. Because the Georgia Mountain Fairgrounds provided no financial support, the garden board looked for other sources of income. They found there were government grants available, but they required the non-profit to have control of the land upon which they operate through ownership or a lease. The garden board also questioned whether their liability insurance would be honored on property not under their control. When asked for a lease, the Georgia Mountain Fairgrounds board refused, stating that they viewed the land as their asset and they would not relinquish control. The Hamilton Gardens at Lake Chatuge board declined to continue their hard work without proper funding, so they dissolved the nonprofit in 2021. The fair board again became responsible for garden operations in late 2021. The fair board hired a part-time gardener to work, but he replaced dozens of volunteers.

=== Current ===
As of 2023, Catherine Luckenbach was the garden curator. The official website showed 2023 as "our year of restoration" with goals that included restoring and painting the wooden bridges, decks, and arbor; placing signs for botanical identification; concerts and art in the garden. A membership campaign was implemented to increase revenue and volunteers in addition to raising admission to $6.

== Gardens ==
The gardens are situated on a slope down to Lake Chatuge. All the trails lead downhill and are considered a moderate hike except the shoreline trail and the extension trail from the Bonnie Day Arbor which are steeper. There are benches provided at intervals along all trails for rest and reflection. The trails themselves utilize pine bark mulch. None are paved. Peak viewing season, characterized as “A Blooming Affair at Hamilton Gardens”, typically begins in mid-April and lasts through mid-May. The gardens showcase several specimen plants that grow only in this location. There are approximately 3,000 plants and perhaps as many as 400 varieties of native azaleas and rhododendrons. In addition to rhododendrons and native azaleas, there are dogwoods, ferns, trillium, tulip magnolias, redbuds, hydrangeas, Solomon's seal, wild ginger and trout lily. A selection of azaleas, rhododendrons, and other plants are typically available for purchase.

=== Festival ===
The 2025 Hamilton Gardens Rhododendron Festival is scheduled for April 12 to May 11. Hours are limited to 11AM – 3PM Monday thru Thursday; 10AM – 4PM Friday thru Sunday. A $10 donation is requested for everyone above age 12.

=== Mission ===
To restore, preserve, and enhance this public botanical legacy garden for the education and enjoyment of all who visit.

=== Attractions ===
- Salzer's Trellis is located beside the main entrance.
- At the south end of the Courey Shoreline Trail is Fishing Hole Rock and the Lakeview Observation Deck.
- Along the right fork of the Main Trail is the Brooks Overlook Deck & water wheel.
- There are Eight metal sculptures created by local artists throughout the garden.
- Off the left fork of the Main Trail is the Bonnie Day Arbor and Bridges. The trail extension past the Arbor is more difficult.
- The 125' Rosebay Bridge is in the middle of the Main Trail below the water wheel.
- The Paris Pavillion is a 2,500 ft² event venue with 360° mountain views.
- Memorial Garden is located just inside the garden off the left fork of the Main Trail.
- Pollinator and Demonstration Gardens are presently closed.
- Celebration Plaza and Fountain was a program begun by Hamilton Gardens at Lake Chatuge to permit donors to honor special people through a gift to the garden. It is temporarily suspended.

=== Recognition ===
The gardens were designated a state botanical garden by the Georgia legislature in 2003, a distinction earned by the diversity of its flora and unique ecosystem.

The American Rhododendron Society bestowed a grant upon the gardens in 2012 to renovate their buildings.

A dedication ceremony in 2018 added 600 bulbs to the garden as part of The Daffodil Project, an international campaign to plant 1.5 million daffodils in a sunny, worldwide tribute to the victims of the September 11 attacks.

== Gallery ==
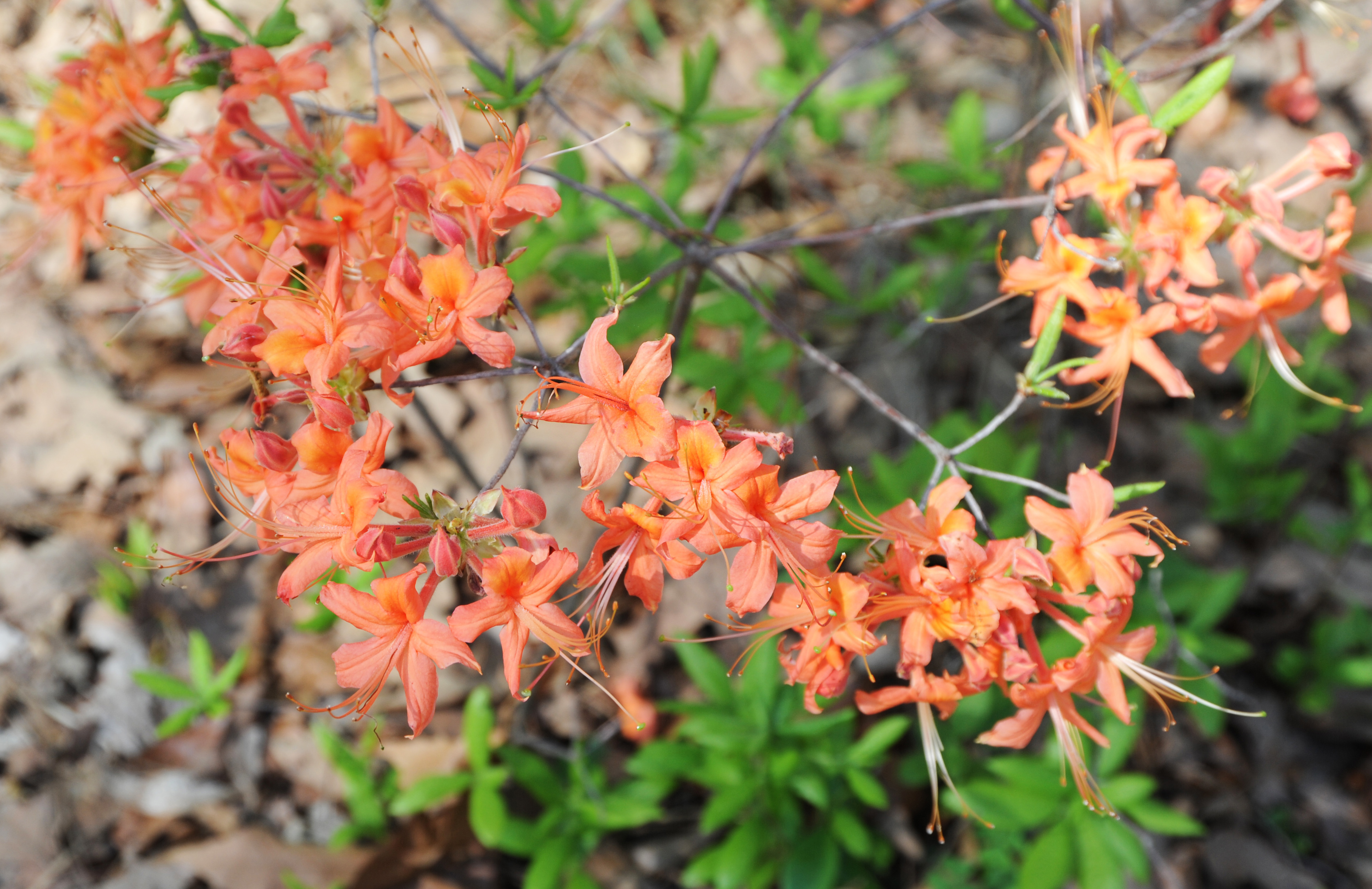
Native Orange Azalea

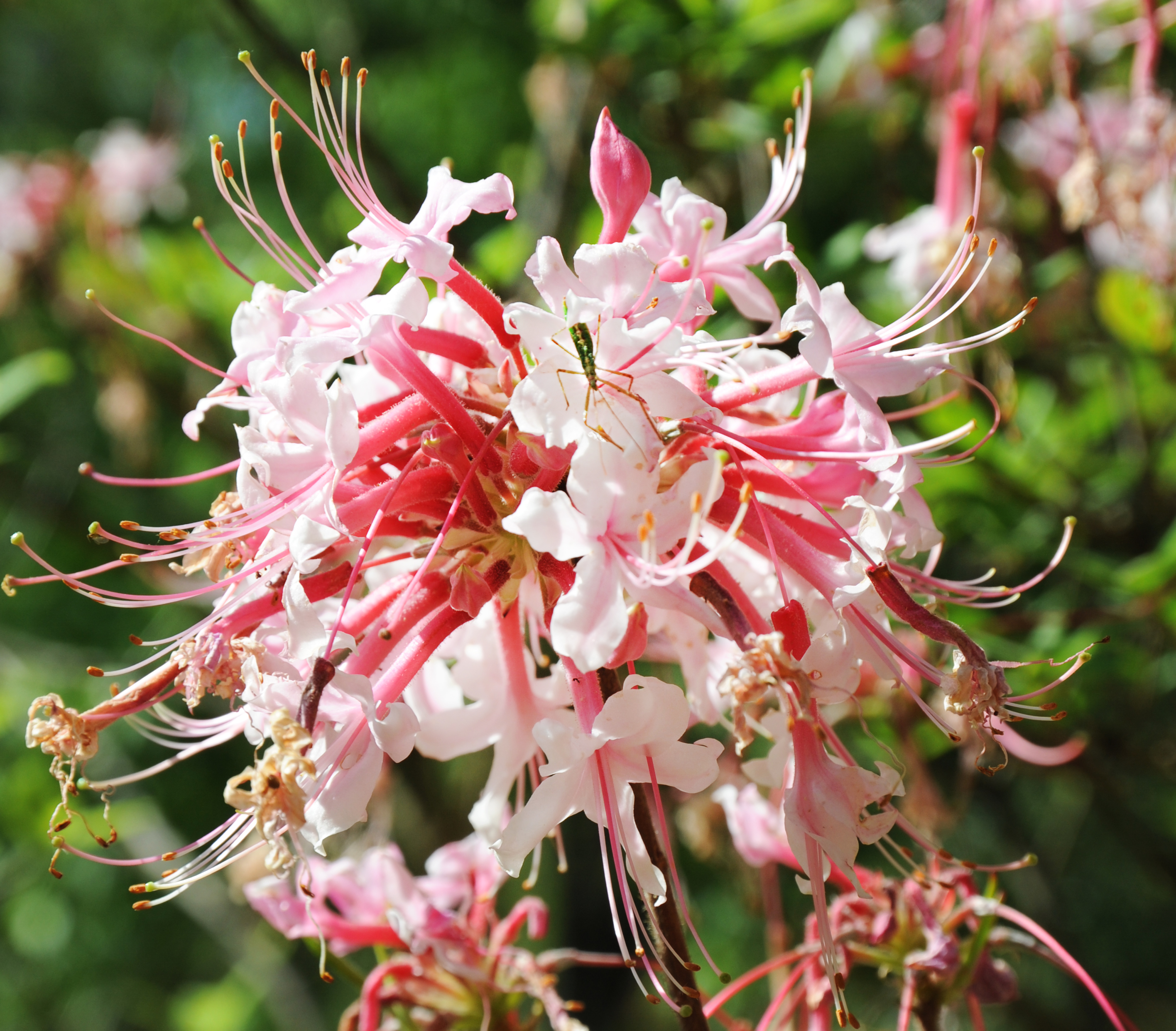
Native Pink Azalea

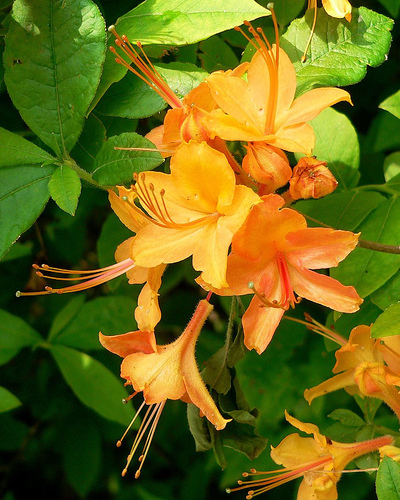
Native Gold

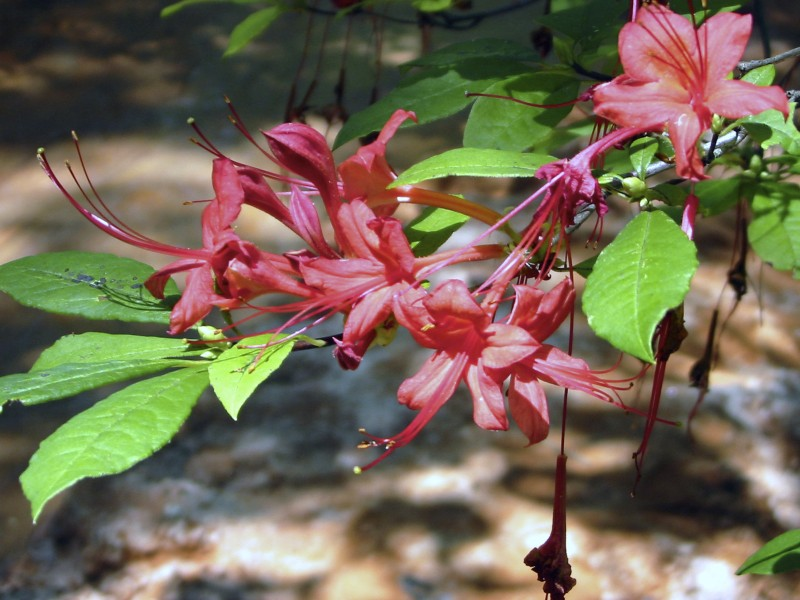
Plumleaf Azalea

Florida Flame Azalea

== See also ==
- List of botanical gardens and arboretums in Georgia (U.S. state)
