= Lockerly Arboretum =

Arboretum in Milledgeville, Georgia, US

Coordinates: 33.06107°N 83.22633°W

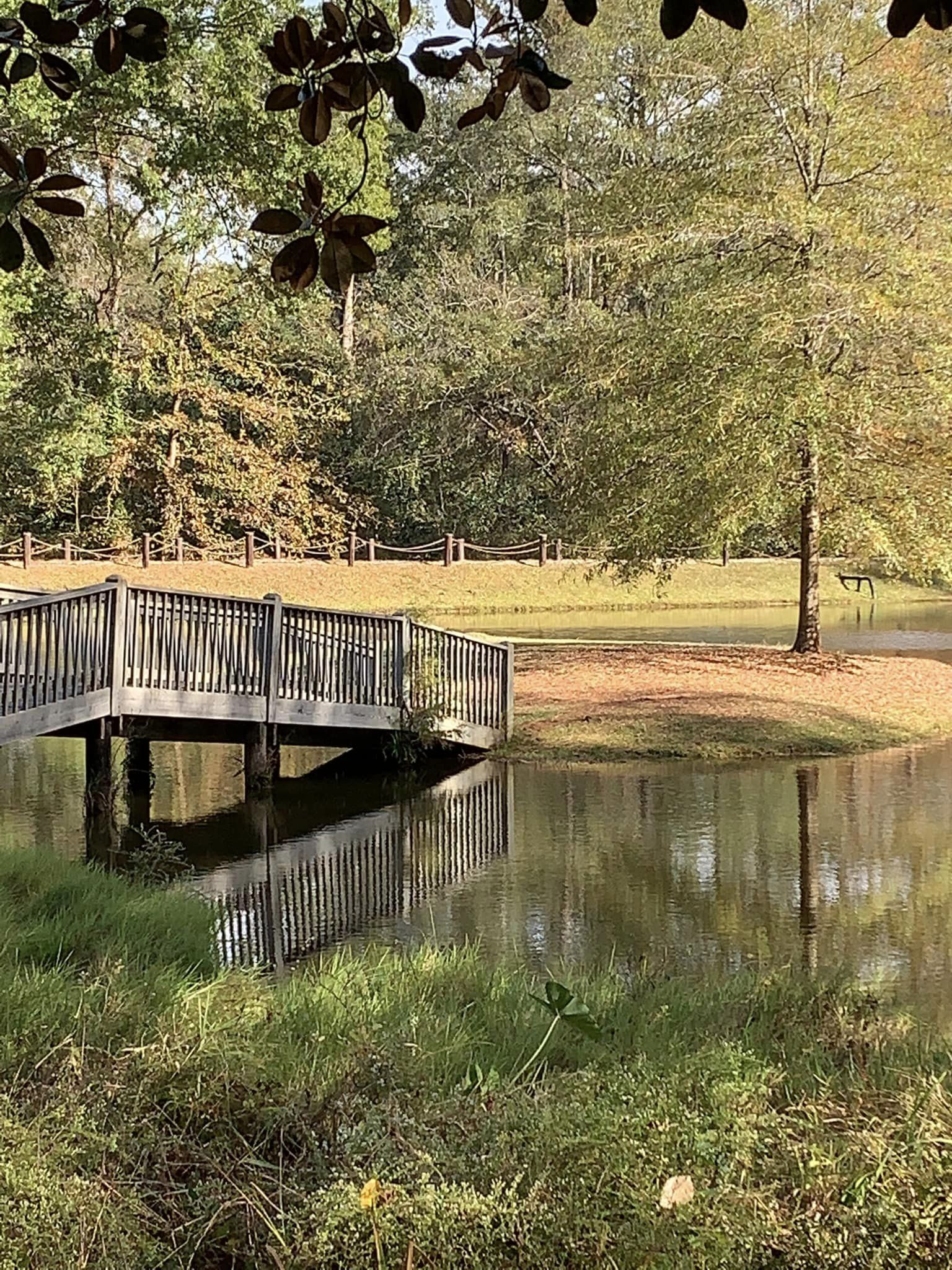
- Lockerly Arboretum pond and bridge
- Interactive map of Lockerly Arboretum
- Website: Lockerly.org

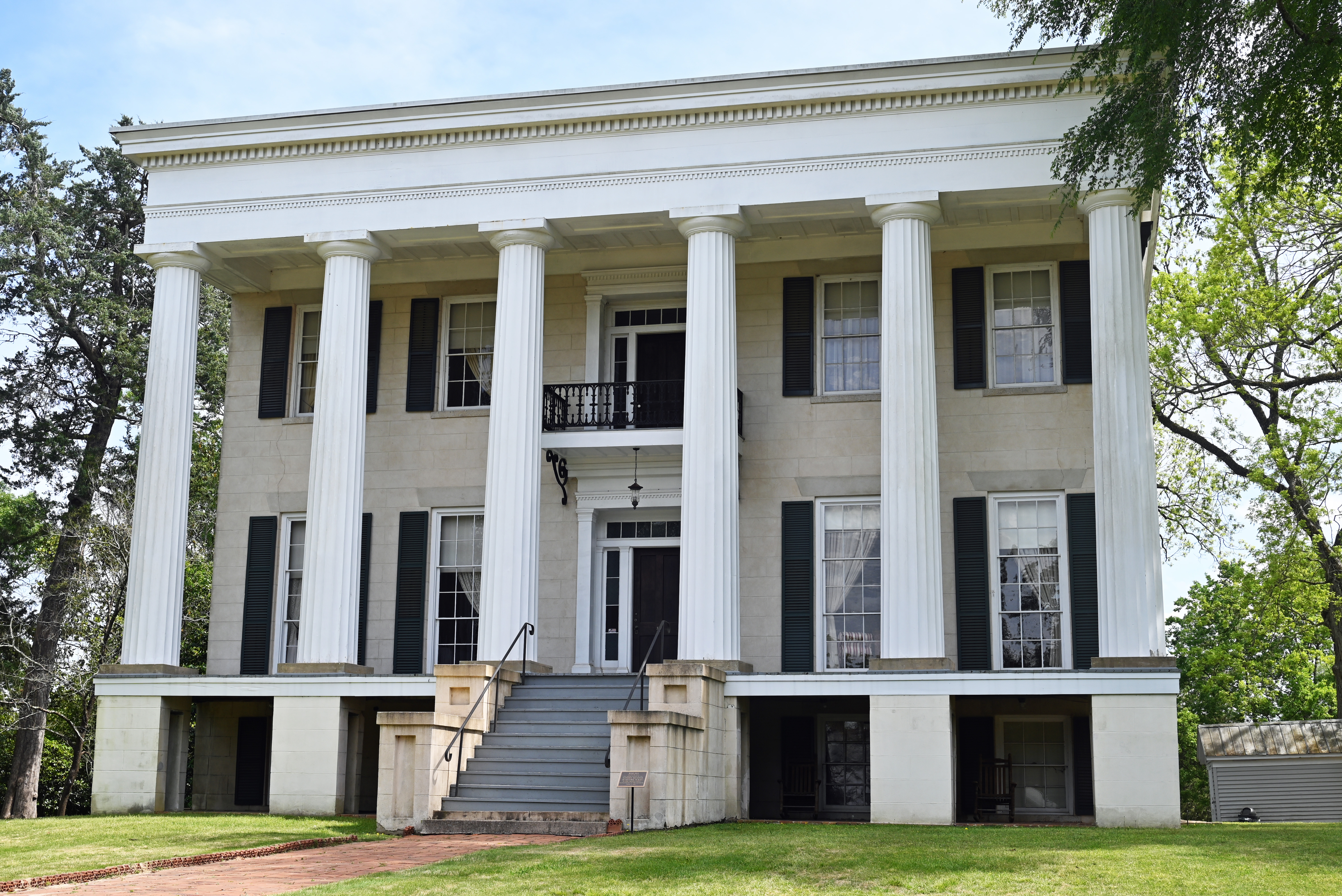
Rose Hill

Lockerly Arboretumin Milledgeville, Georgia provides a space for enjoying nature and learning about various plants and trees. As a nonprofit, it offers free access to visitors every day except Sundays.

Established in 1965, it surrounds the historic Antebellum mansion, "Lockerly," originally known as "Rose Hill," built in 1852 by Judge and Mrs. Daniel R. Tucker. A.J. Downing, who was the Tuckers' friend, influenced the grounds.

The arboretum originally spanned 50 acres. In 1998, it was expanded significantly when Colonel Oliver N. Worley donated 200 additional acres to create an Environmental Education facility.

With its diverse collections - including azaleas, camellia, conifers, holly, rhododendron, viburnum, daylilies, and irises - it offers an exceptional space for botanical exploration. The inclusion of a greenhouse filled with cacti and tropical plants adds a dynamic range to its horticultural offerings.

The historic Rose Hill mansion became part of the National Register of Historic Places in 2017, establishing its significance as a cultural and historical landmark.

== See also ==
- List of botanical gardens in the United States
