= Georgia Perimeter College Botanical Garden =

Botanical garden in Decatur, Georgia, United States

Coordinates: 33.68692°N 84.27435°W

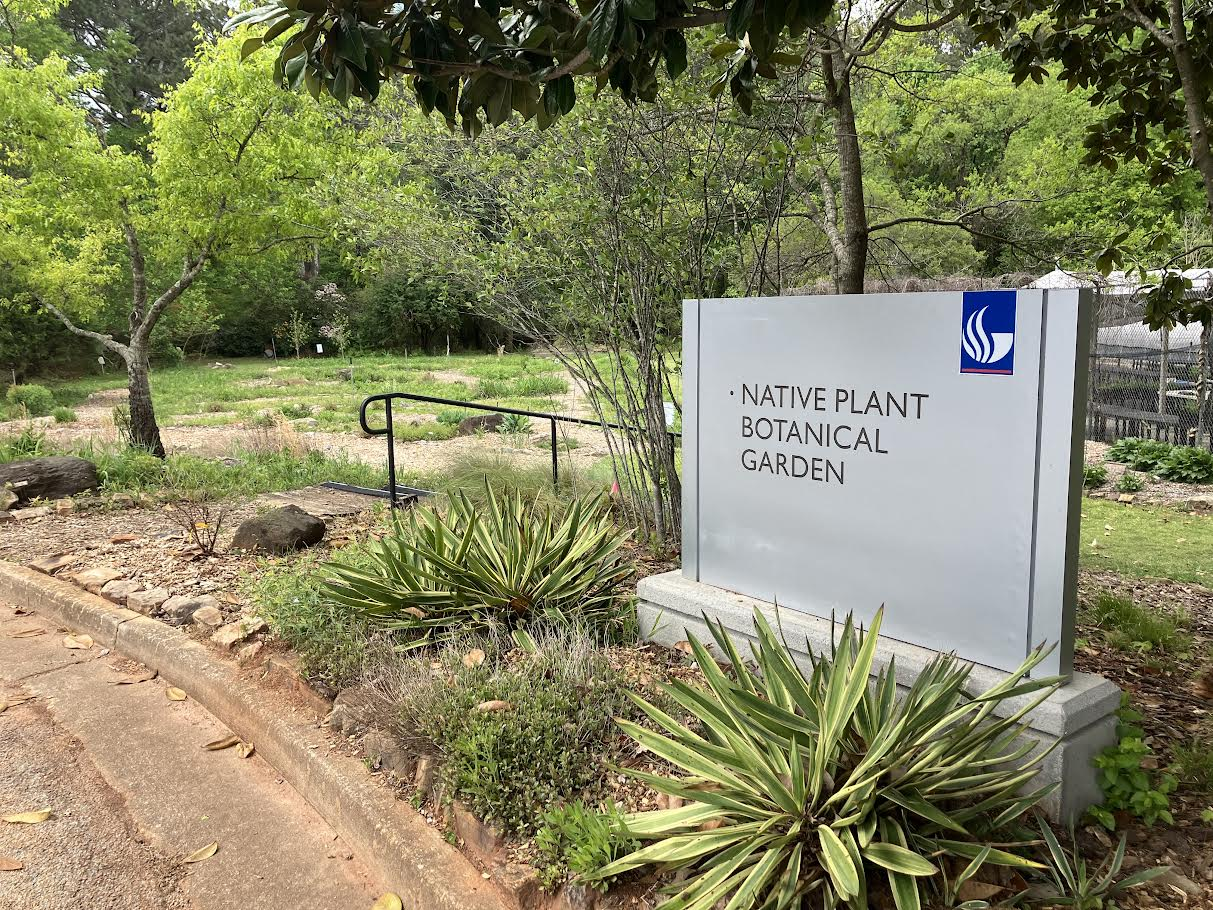
- Garden Sign (April 2025)
- Interactive map of Georgia Perimeter College Botanical Garden
- Website: Official website

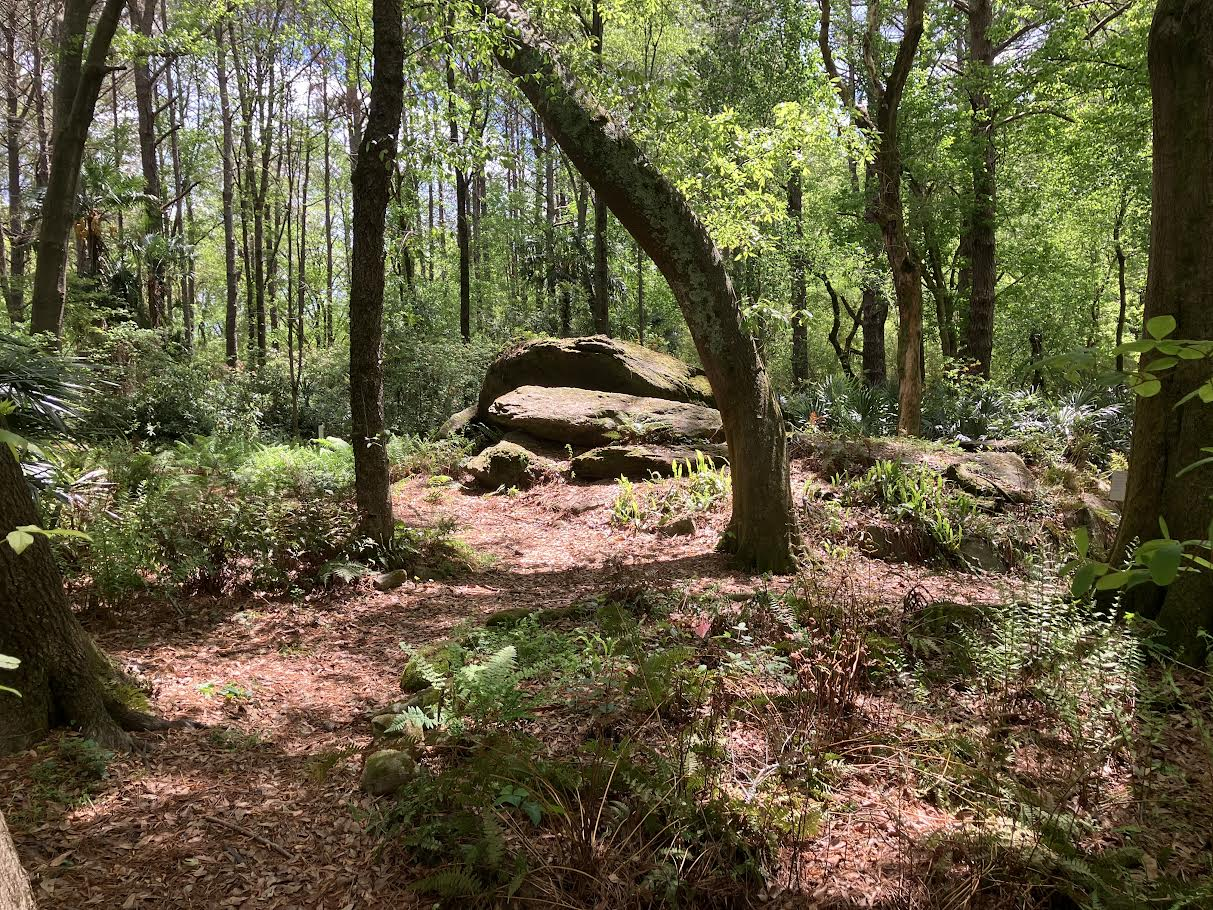
April 2025

The Georgia Perimeter College Botanical Garden is a 4-acre (1.6 ha) botanical garden located on the Decatur Campus of the Georgia Perimeter College at 3251 Panthersville Road, Decatur, Georgia, United States. The garden is open daily without fee.

The garden was established in 1990 by George Sanko as the DeKalb College Botanical Garden. It now contains over 4,000 species of native, rare, and endangered plants indigenous to the American Southeast. The garden includes bog plants, native trees, shrubs, vines, and perennial plants, as well as a large fern collection and about .75 miles (1.2 km) of walking trails.

== See also ==
- 1990 in the environment
- List of botanical gardens in the United States
