= Gibbs Gardens =

Botanical garden

Coordinates: 34°22′39″N 84°16′48″W

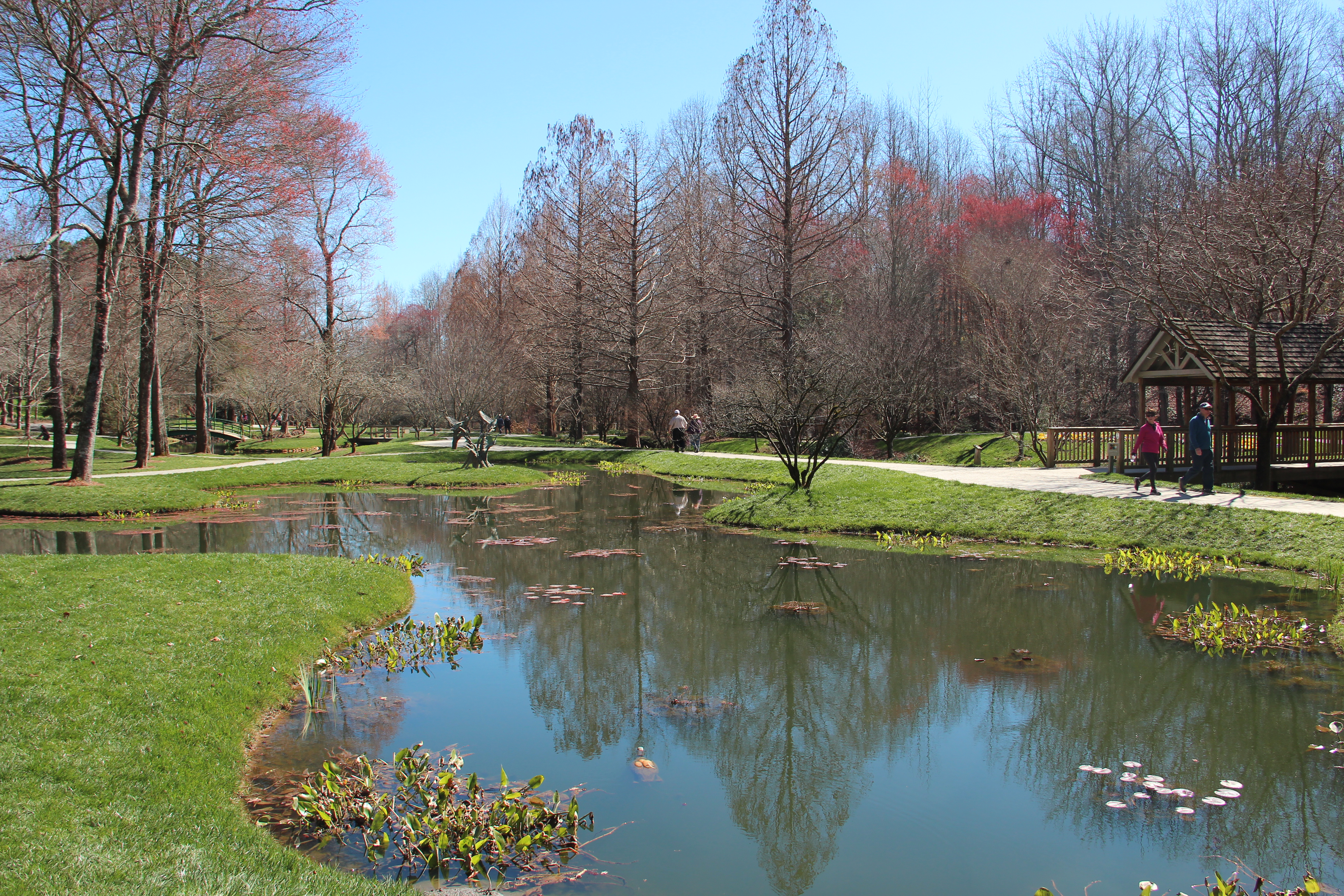
- One of the ponds in the gardens.
- Interactive map of Gibbs Gardens
- Website: GibbsGardens.com

Gibbs Gardens is a 376 acres (152 ha) privately owned botanical garden located in Cherokee County, Georgia. It is open to the public except in the winter.

== History ==
The garden started on 200 acres (81 ha) of farmland and woodland along Yellow Creek Road in Cherokee County. Jim Gibbs purchased the land from Broughton Bannister in September 1980. Additional adjacent parcels were purchased by Mr. Gibbs over the years to reach the current 376 acres (152 ha), including 40 acres (16 ha) in Pickens County.

The Garden opened in 2012 and has 6 feature gardens and 18 seasonal color gardens.

== Feature gardens ==
=== Daffodil Gardens ===
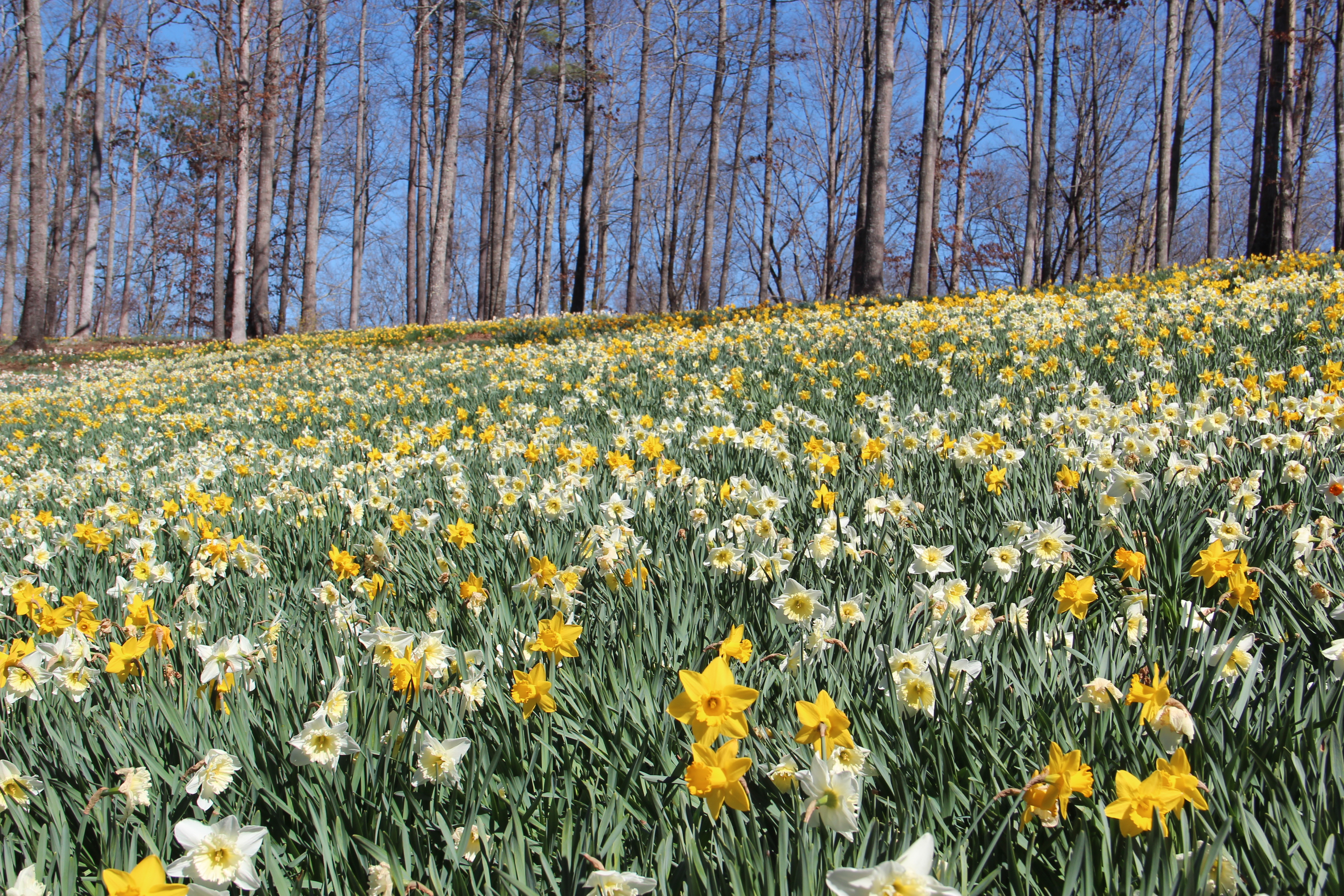
Daffodils

Starting in 1985, 50 acres (20 ha) were planted with hundreds of thousands of daffodil bulbs. Perennial bulbs divide every season, so the number of blooms increases from year to year. Daffodils are planted on hillsides with different color and bloom time varieties.

=== Manor House Gardens ===
Seven terraces with 150 feet (46 m) of elevation variance from the Manor House down to the Valley Gardens, these gardens have views of Mount Oglethorpe.

=== Waterlily Gardens ===
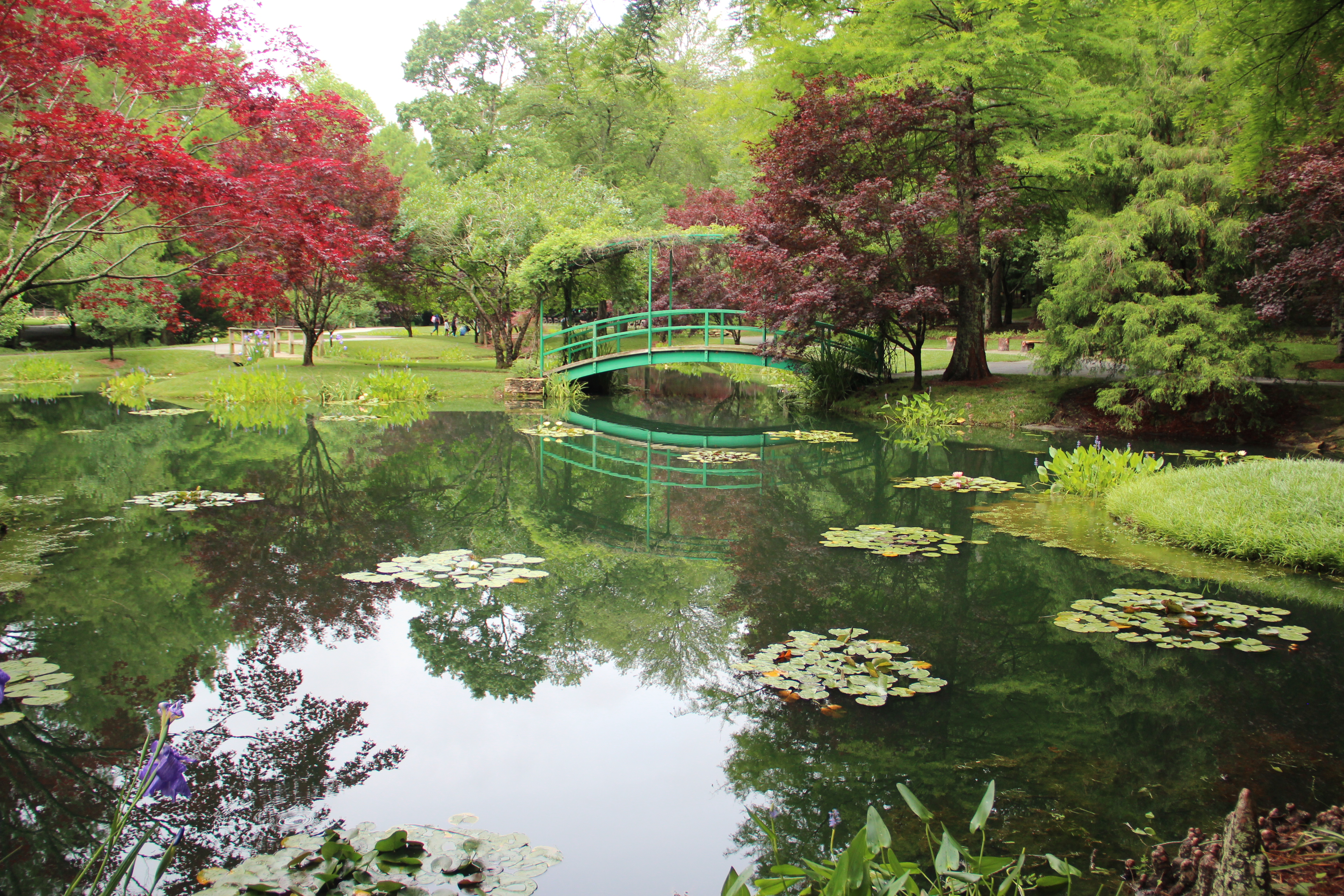
Monet Bridge

The Waterlily Gardens have spring fed ponds with hardy and tropical waterlilies. The Monet Bridge is modeled after the Japanese bridge in Monet's Waterlily Gardens.

=== Japanese Gardens ===
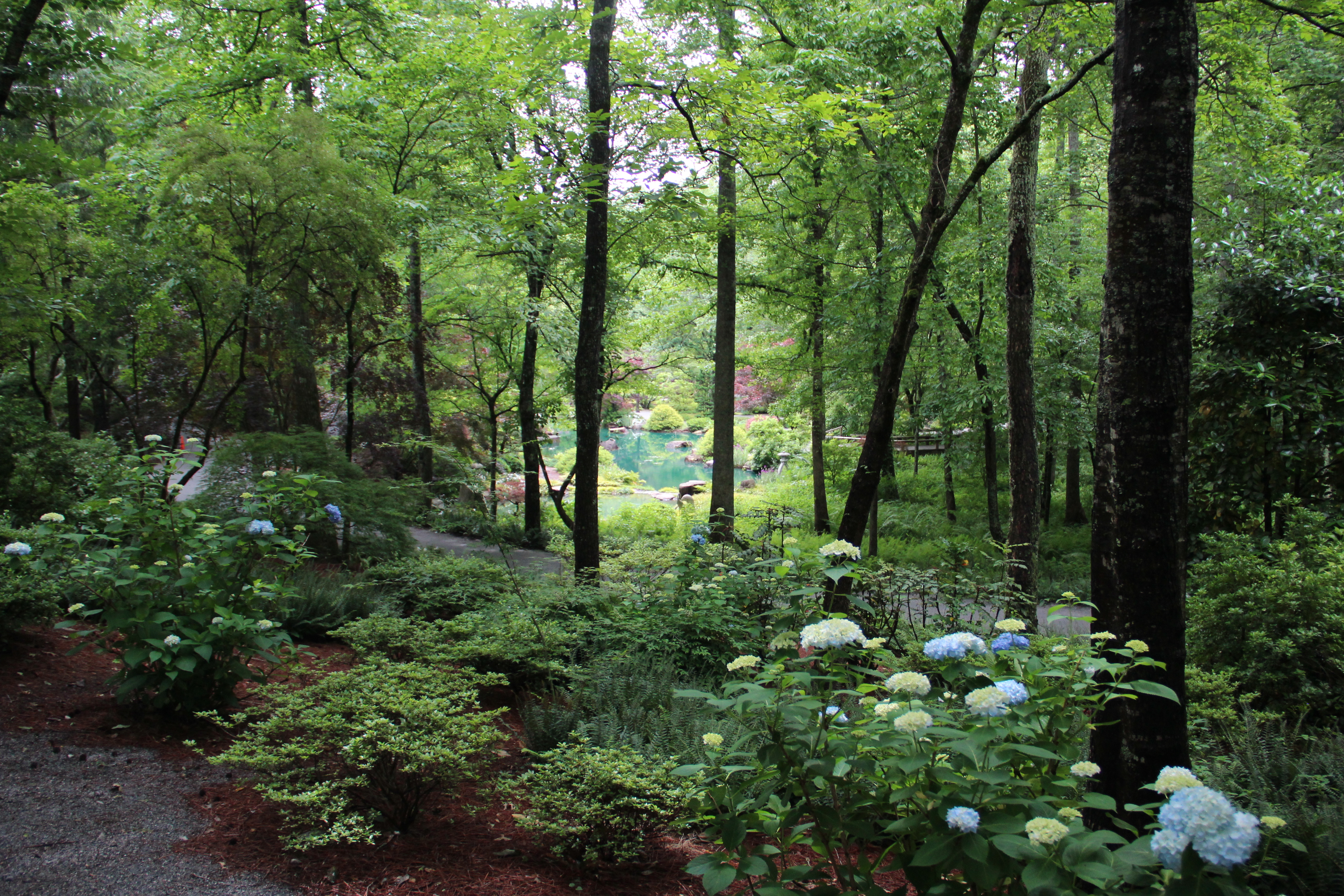
Japanese Gardens

The 40-acre (16 ha) Japanese Gardens contains shrubs and trees pruned in the tradition of Japanese bonsai. The entrance is through the torii gate and this garden also features a zig zag bridge.

=== Inspiration Gardens ===
Added in 2021, the Inspiration Gardens includes flowering trees and shrubs suited to average-sized home gardens. The 15 acres (6.1 ha) have dwarf conifers, knock out roses, and Encore and native azaleas.

=== Le Jardin, The Color Garden ===
Added in the summer of 2023, this garden has nine flower beds featuring annuals and perennials.
