= State Botanical Garden of Georgia =

Botanical garden in Athens, Georgia, USA

Coordinates: 33°54′05.01″N 83°22′46.17″W

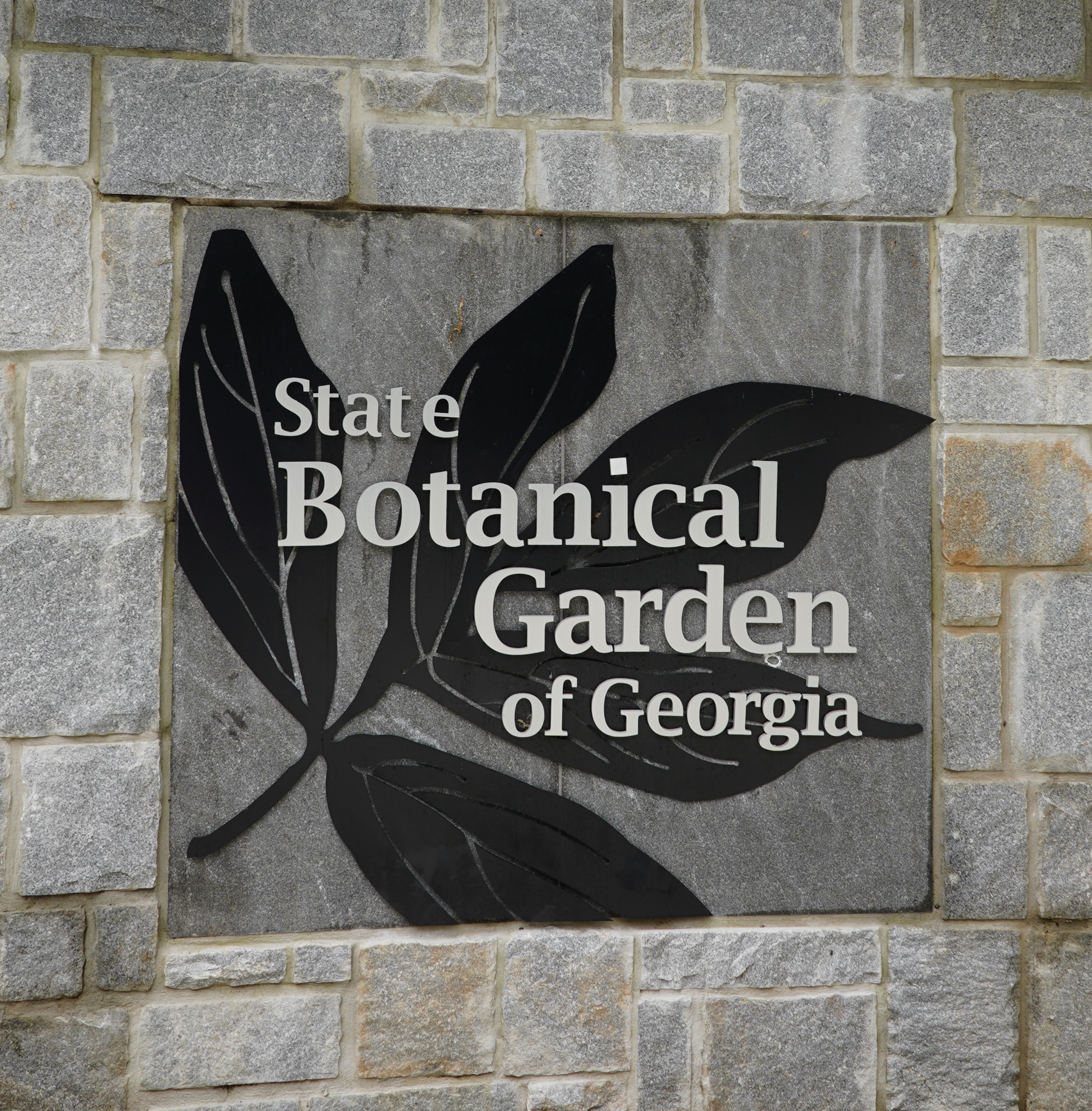
- Interactive map of State Botanical Garden of Georgia
- Type: Botanical garden
- Location: Athens, Georgia
- Website: botgarden.uga.edu

The State Botanical Garden of Georgia is a botanical garden of 323 acres (131 hectares) in the United States, with a conservatory operated by the University of Georgia. It is located at 2450 South Milledge Avenue, Athens, Georgia along the east bank of the Middle Oconee River.

== History ==
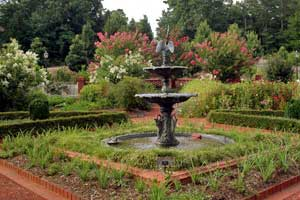
Fountain in the garden.

The botanical garden was first proposed in 1967 and construction began on the site three years later, in 1970. It was originally called the University of Georgia Botanical Garden.

In 1971 Jimmy Carter, then Georgia governor, with his wife Rosalynn Carter toured the garden's trails and later allocate $13,000 in state funds for a master plan. The garden received more funding, over $650,000, for a headquarters building from the Callaway Foundation. Rosalynn Carter visited the garden again on July 18, 1974, for the groundbreaking of the building, which was later completed in 1975.

Between 1970 and 1978, the garden's budget increased over 400 percent.

In September 1982, ground was broken for the $2.6 million Visitor Center and Conservatory building, which was opened to the public in 1985. The Callaway Foundation also funded an entrance plaza and fountain for the building.

In September 1982, there was a groundbreaking for a Visitor Center and Conservatory building. This building cost $2.6 million and later opened to the public in 1985.

The Georgia General Assembly designated the garden as The State Botanical Garden of Georgia in February 1984 in an act that allowed the garden to receive more state funding.

An additional 19.3 acres were added to the garden property in 1990 and it totals 323 acres as of 2024.

In 1994, the Day Chapel was completed.

Jenny Cruse-Sanders was named director in 2017, replacing former director Wilf Nicholls. That same year, the garden broke ground for the Alice H. Richards Children's Garden which later opened in 2019.

The Fire Prevention and Response Program at the United States Fish and Wildlife Service granted the garden $1.6 million for a native seed network. This network is intended for habitat restoration after natural disasters.

== Facilities ==
The garden has 235,000 visitors a year, as of 2017. It has 290 acres of natural area and 32 acres of cultivated gardens, eight of which are specialty gardens.

The 2.5-acre Alice H. Richards Children's Garden opened in 2019. Features include a stone map of Georgia, a pitcher plant bog, and a cave replica embedded with fossils. It was named after a member of the garden's Board of Advisors, Alice H. Richards, where after her death in 2007 her family donated $1 million for a children's garden.

The Winter WonderLights is a yearly event in November and December that include a half-mile walking trail, which features over one million light bulbs and garnered 63,000 visitors in 2023.

=== Garden ===
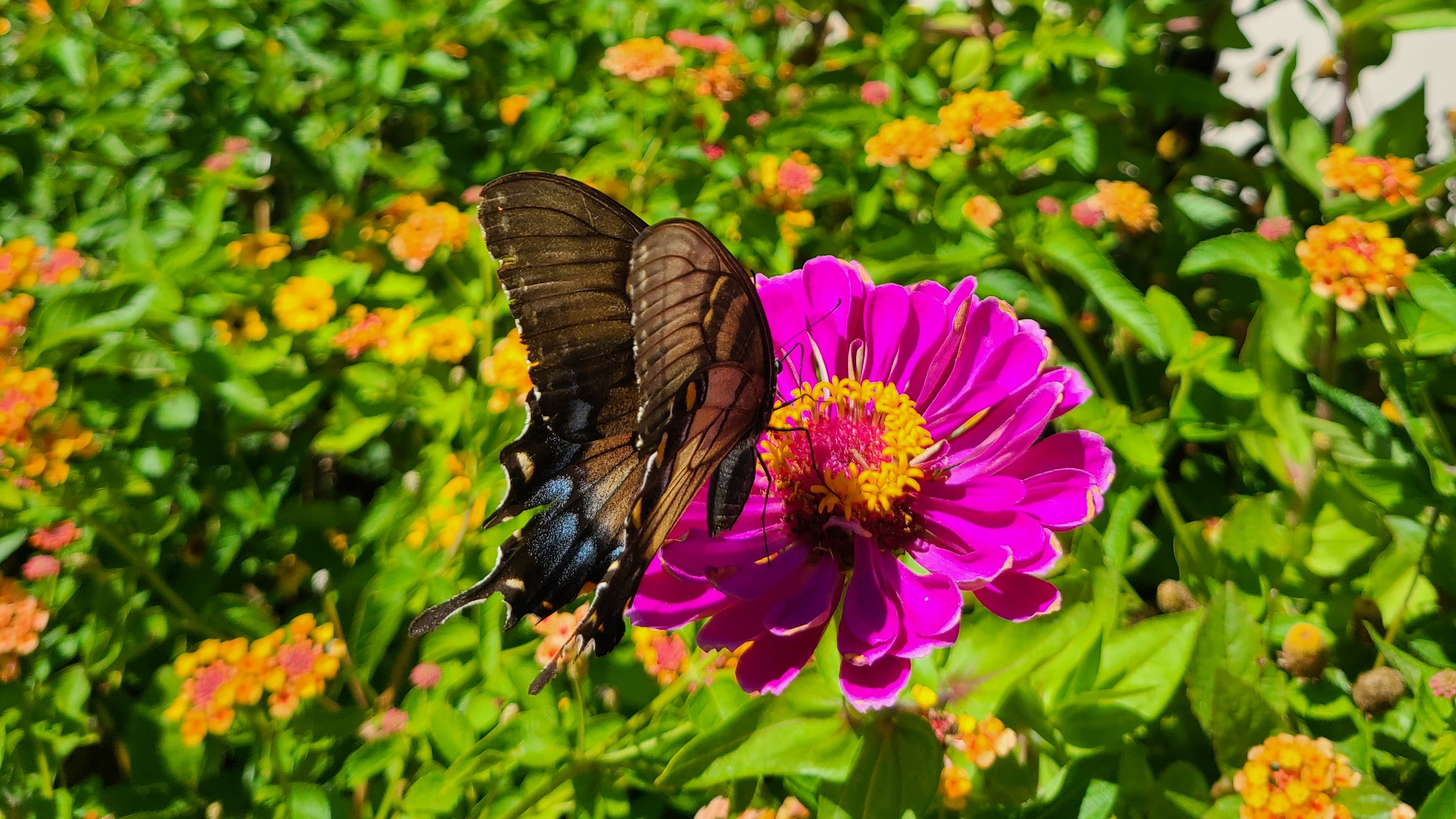
Eastern Tiger Swallowtail on a flower.

The Garden contains eleven botanical and horticultural collections:

- Annual/Perennial Garden - annuals and perennials
- Dahlia Garden (1987) - dahlias
- Groundcover Collection - bugleflower, euonymus, hypericum, ivy, juniper, liriope, ophiopogon, thrift, vinca, etc.
- Heritage Garden - plants of historic and social interest to Georgia, including apples, pears, and peaches, cotton, peanuts, and tobacco.
- International Garden - Middle Ages (Herb Garden and Physic Garden), Age of Exploration (Mediterranean & Middle East, Spanish America, American South, and China sections), and Age of Conservation (American Indian Plants, Bog Garden, Threatened & Endangered Plants).
- Native Azalea Collection - azaleas
- Native Flora Garden - more than 300 species, including ferns, trilliums, bloodroot, and lady slipper orchids.
- Rhododendron Collection (1976) - rhododendrons
- Flower Garden - Brand new in 2008.
- Shade Garden - azalea, camellia, dogwood, laurel, magnolia, redbud, and viburnum.
- Trial Garden - shrubs and trees under evaluation for the southeastern United States.

== See also ==
- University of Georgia Campus Arboretum
- List of botanical gardens in the United States
- Coastal Georgia Botanical Gardens
