= Thompson Mills Forest =

Research forest in Georgia, USA

Coordinates: 34.143°N 83.798°W

- Interactive map of Thompson Mills Forest
- Website: Official website

Thompson Mills Forest (330 acres) is a research forest and Georgia's official state arboretum. It is located at 8755 Highway 53 (off New Liberty Church Road), Braselton, Georgia, and operated by the Warnell School of Forestry and Natural Resources

In 1980 the forest was deeded to the University of Georgia by Lenox T. Thornton, for teaching and research, to establish an arboretum of native and exotic trees, and for public education and appreciation. In 1991 it was designated the state's official arboretum. When deeded, the forest was a late-secondary Piedmont oak-hickory forest, dominated by Quercus, Carya, Liriodendron, and Fagus. Since 1980 more than 100 species have been added to the 80 native species already present.

Today the forest includes about 90% of Georgia's native trees, and a major pinetum with more than 100 conifer species. The Eva Thompson Thornton Garden (7 acres) contains more than 100 ornamental trees from around the world. The arboretum also contains an interesting granite outcrop and several miles of walking trails.

== See also ==
- List of botanical gardens and arboretums in the United States
