= Kumar Rocker =

American baseball player (born 1999)

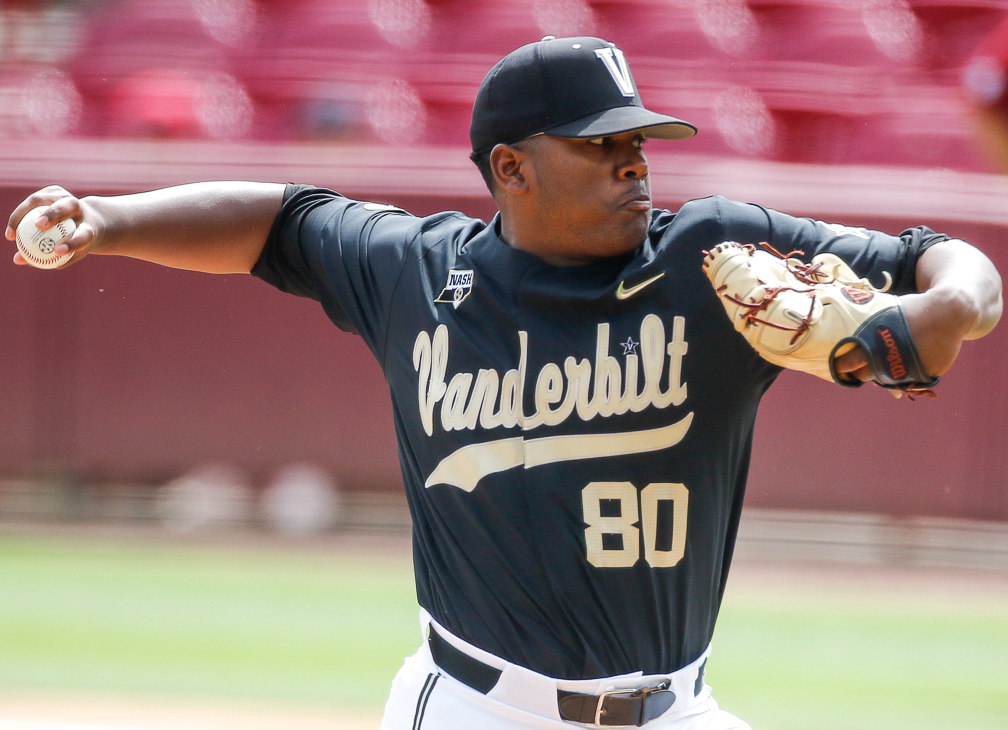
- Rocker with the Vanderbilt Commodores

Texas Rangers – No. 80
- Pitcher
- Born: November 22, 1999 (age 26); Watkinsville, Georgia, U.S.
- Bats: Right Throws: Right

MLB debut
- September 12, 2024, for the Texas Rangers

MLB statistics (through 2026 season)
- Win–loss record: 10–18
- Earned run average: 4.74
- Strikeouts: 208
- Stats at Baseball Reference

Teams
- Texas Rangers (2024–present)
Medals
Men's baseball
Representing United States
U-18 Baseball World Cup
Gold medal – first place	2017 Thunder Bay	Team

Kumar Rocker (born November 22, 1999) is an American professional baseball pitcher for the Texas Rangers of Major League Baseball (MLB). Rocker played college baseball for the Vanderbilt Commodores. He was selected with the 10th pick in the 2021 MLB draft by the New York Mets but was not signed. After one year with the Tri-City ValleyCats of the Frontier League, he was selected by the Rangers with the third overall pick in the 2022 MLB draft. He signed with the Rangers and made his MLB debut in 2024.

== Early life and amateur career ==
Rocker was born in Watkinsville, Georgia and grew up in Montgomery, Alabama, Arkansas, and Tennessee before ultimately settling back in Georgia. Some sources have described him as having been born in Montgomery, Alabama.

Rocker attended North Oconee High School in Bogart, Georgia. As a junior in 2017, he had a 1.63 earned run average (ERA) with 68 strikeouts in 55 2/3 innings. That year, he played in the Under Armour All-America Baseball Game and Perfect Game All-American Classic. Later in the summer, he played for the USA Baseball 18U National Team.

Rocker committed to Vanderbilt University to play college baseball. He was considered one of the top prospects for the 2018 Major League Baseball draft, but was not selected until the 38th round by the Colorado Rockies, falling due to signability concerns. He did not sign with the Rockies and enrolled at Vanderbilt.

On June 8, 2019, Rocker became the first pitcher ever to throw a no-hitter in the Super Regional round during the NCAA Division I baseball tournament. He recorded 19 strikeouts as Vanderbilt beat Duke 3–0. Rocker was named the 2019 College World Series Most Outstanding Player after Vanderbilt captured the 2019 NCAA Division I Baseball Championship on June 26, 2019. Rocker won both his starts in the College World Series and finished his freshman season with a 12–5 record. He was also named the 2019 Baseball America Freshman of the Year.

The New York Mets selected Rocker with the 10th pick in the first round of the 2021 MLB draft. Rocker and the Mets had verbally agreed on a $6 million signing bonus, $1.4 million above the slot value for the 10th pick, but the Mets decided not to make him an offer after reviewing his medical information. Rocker had not participated in a program that would have made his medical information available pre-draft; this allowed the Mets not to make him an offer and receive a compensatory selection in the 2022 MLB draft. Rocker's agent, Scott Boras, stated that Rocker "requires no medical attention." However, Rocker had surgery on his shoulder in September. Rocker did not return to Vanderbilt after going unsigned.

== Professional career ==
=== Tri-City ValleyCats ===
In advance of the 2022 MLB draft, on May 13, 2022, Rocker signed with the Tri-City ValleyCats of the Frontier League. Prior to the draft, Rocker had a 1.35 ERA with 32 strikeouts and four walks in 20 innings pitched for Tri-City, reaching 99 miles per hour (159 km/h) with his fastball.

=== Texas Rangers ===
The Texas Rangers selected Rocker in the first round, with the third overall selection, reuniting him with his former Vanderbilt teammate Jack Leiter. On July 26, 2022, Rocker signed with Texas for a $5.2 million signing bonus. Rocker did not appear in a game after signing, instead working out at the Rangers' spring training facility. Following the 2022 season, Rocker played for the Surprise Saguaros of the Arizona Fall League. Over six games in the AFL, Rocker went 2–1 with a 4.50 ERA and 18 strikeouts over 14 innings.

Rocker received a non-roster invitation to major league spring training in 2023. He made 6 starts for the High-A Hickory Crawdads, posting a 2–2 record and 3.86 ERA with 42 strikeouts in 28.0 innings pitched. On May 16, 2023, it was announced that Rocker would require Tommy John surgery, ending his season.

On September 12, 2024, the Rangers selected Rocker's contract and promoted him for his major league debut that night against the Seattle Mariners.

Rocker made the Rangers' Opening Day roster out of spring training in 2025.

== Personal life ==
His father, Tracy Rocker, played in the National Football League (NFL), is a College Football Hall of Famer from Auburn University, and is the defensive line coach for the Tennessee Titans. His Telugu maternal grandparents immigrated to the United States from Andhra Pradesh, India. His parents met when his mother, Lalitha, was a student at the University of Maryland and his father was playing for the Washington Redskins.
