= North Oconee High School =

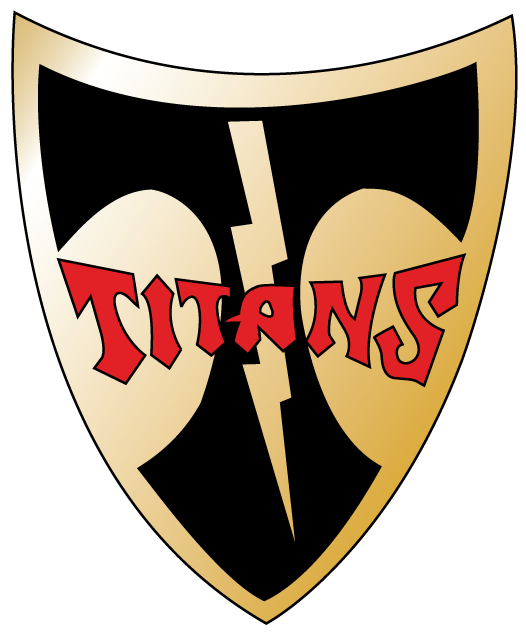

Location
- 1081 Rocky Branch Road; Bogart, Georgia 30622; United States; 33.8779°N 83.5238°W

Information
- Type: Public High School
- Established: 2004
- School district: Oconee County School District
- Principal: Keith Carter
- Teaching staff: 85.00 (FTE)
- Grades: 9–12
- Enrollment: 1,479 (2025–2026)
- Student to teacher ratio: 17.32
- Colors: Red, gold, and black
- Athletics: GHSA Division AAAA Region 8
- Mascot: Titans
- Website: https://nohs.oconeeschools.org/

North Oconee High School (NOHS) is a public school located in Bogart, Georgia, United States. It opened in 2004 and is the second public high school in Oconee County. The school's mascot is Titans, and its colors are red, black, and gold. The school currently has upwards of 1400 students.

== Academics ==
North Oconee consistently rates highly in academic standings. The high school is continually regarded as one of the top high schools in Georgia. It is ranked in the top 3% of schools nationally, and as the top school in SAT and ACT scores in northeast Georgia. According to data supplied by the North Oconee High School School Profile, the school's 2025 graduation rate was 100%.

The Georgia High School Graduation Test reports rates by school system. The Georgia Department of Education, aggregating scores of both North Oconee High School and Oconee County High School, ranks Oconee County in the top 5 of the 180 Georgia school systems. The Newsweek ranking of top high schools consistently names North Oconee in the top 3% of high schools in the nation.

Both Oconee County high schools were named Advanced Placement Merit Schools, the only two public high schools in the greater Athens area to receive this recognition. To receive this distinction, at least 20% of the students must take AP exams, with 50% or more scoring the passing score of 3 or higher.

According to the demographics from the Georgia Department of Education, approximately 87% of the student body are White, 4% Black, 4% Hispanic, and 2% are of mixed ethnicity. About 25% are enrolled in the gifted program and less than 1% are enrolled in remedial education. Over 69% of graduates are eligible for the Hope Scholarship.

North Oconee has approximately 80 teachers. About 73% hold master's degrees or higher.

== Athletic teams ==
The school competes at the AAAA division level in region 8. It competes in many major local and regional high school athletics.

- Fall sports
  - Football (Tackle and Flag)
  - Cross country
  - Football cheerleading
  - Competition cheerleading
  - Softball (Fast and Slow-pitch)
  - Volleyball
- Winter sports
  - Esports
  - Wrestling
  - Boys basketball
  - Girls basketball
  - Basketball cheerleading
  - Swimming and diving
- Spring sports
  - Baseball
  - Bass Fishing
  - Boys soccer
  - Girls soccer
  - Boys golf
  - Girls golf
  - Girls gymnastics
  - Boys lacrosse
  - Girls lacrosse
  - Track and field
  - Tennis

== Athletic championships ==
- Girls' tennis team won the first place in State GHSA Division 8AAAA for the 2016–2017 season.
- Girls' track and field won the first place in GHSA Division AA in 2008 and 2010.
- Girls' soccer won the GHSA state championship in 2021 for AAAA
- Boys baseball team won the GHSA state championship in both 2022 and 2023 for AAAA
- Girls’ Gymnastics team has won the GHSA state championship in 2019, 2021, 2022, 2023, 2024, and 2025. The 2020 season was cancelled due to COVID.

On December 17, 2024, North Oconee High School won the GHSA 4AAAA state football championship defeating top-ranked Marist School 14-7. It was North Oconee's first state football championship. North Oconee's Flag football team finished second in the GHSA Division 2 championship, losing to Greenbriar 18-0.

== NOHS Titan Regiment ==
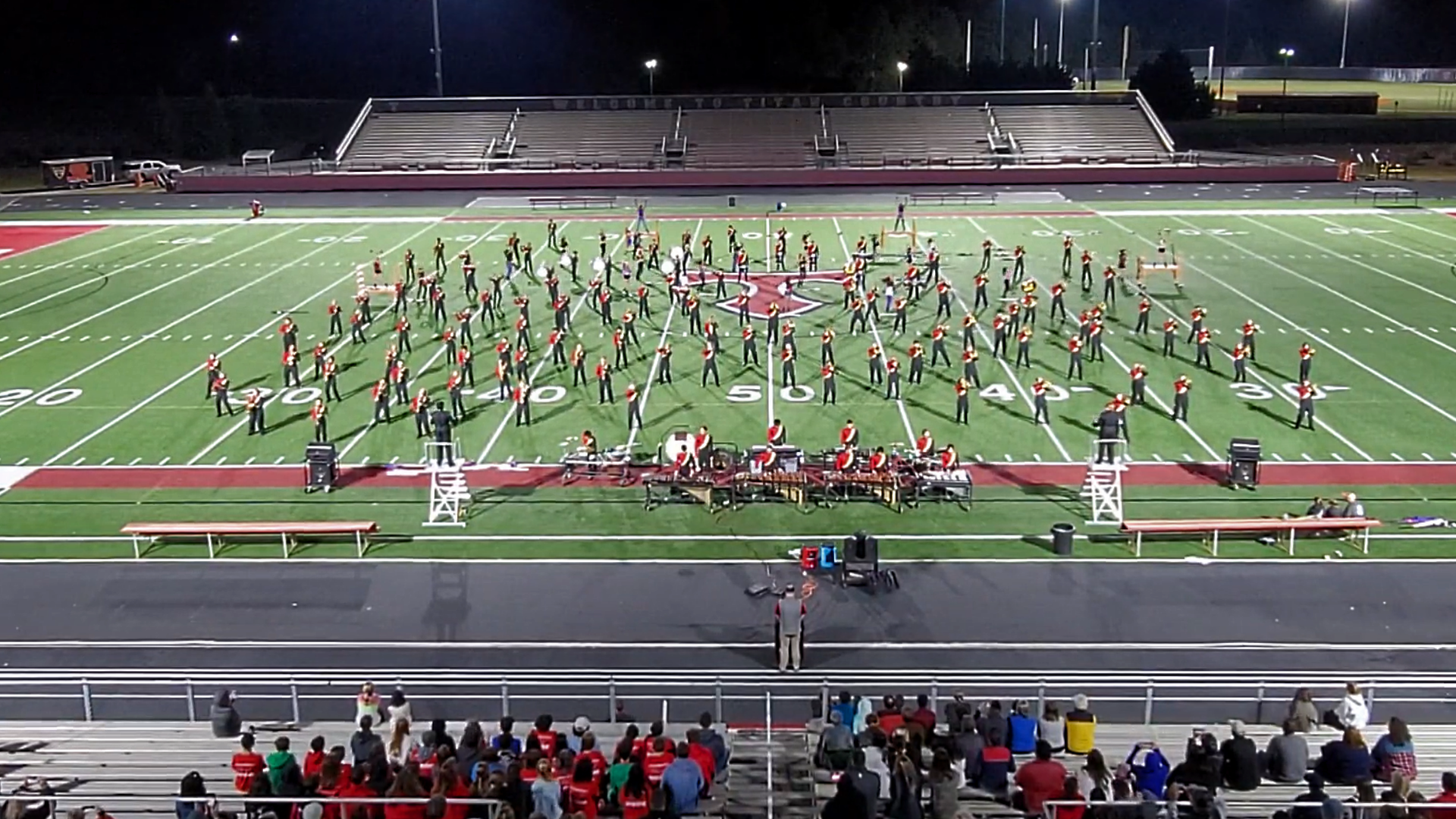
The Titan Regiment's Performance of the "I Wanna Rock" halftime show, performed in October 2021

The Regiment is the ambassadorial music organization for North Oconee High School. During the fall season, the Titan Regiment functions and performs as a marching band, and in the spring, a concert band. The band also has some optional programs, such as a Jazz Band and Solo Ensemble.

During the fall season, the Titan Regiment Marching Band performs halftime shows and 'stands tunes' during football games. The band also participates in marching competitions across Georgia. The marching band's competition awards include:

- 2021-2022 Grovetown Invitational - All Superior ratings In Open Class - 2nd place band - 1st place color guard - 2nd place drum major - 2nd place percussion
- 2021-2022 Sound of the County Invitational at Harris County HS - All superior ratings In Open Class - 2nd place band - 1st place color guard - 2nd place drumline - 2nd place drum major
- 2020-2021 Lake Lanier Tournament of Bands - All Superior Ratings - 2nd Place 4A Band
- 2020-2021 Lake Hartwell Marching Competition - All Superior Ratings In class 4A - 1st Place Band
- 2019-2020 Grovetown Invitational at Grovetown High School - All superior ratings - 1st place band in class 4A
- 2019-2020 Golden River Marching Festival at Haralson County High School - All superior ratings - 1st place band in class 4A - Best front ensemble award
- 2018-2019 Georgia Contest of Champions at East Jackson High School - Overall Grand Champion Band - All Superior Ratings - 1st place band in class 4A
- 2018-2019 Lake Lanier Tournament of Bands at Chestatee High School - All Superior Ratings - 1st place band in class 4A
- 2017-2018 Band-Superior-2nd place in class 3A
- 2017-2018 Bowdon Invitational Marching Festival and Competition - Band Superior, 2nd place in class 3A
- 2016-2017 Peach State Classic - Band Superior, 2nd place in class 3A
- 2016-2017 Georgia Contest of Champions - Band Superior, 1st place in class 3A
- 2015-2016 Georgia Contest of Champions - Band Superior, 1st place in class 2A
- 2015-2016 Creekview Classic - Band Superior - 1st place in class 2A
- 2014-2015 Golden River Marching Festival - Band Superior, 2nd Place – Class AAA
- 2013-2014 Greater Atlanta Area Marching Contest - Band Superior, 1st Place – Class AAA
- 2013-2014 Lake Lanier Tournament of Bands - Band Superior, 1st Place – Class AAA
- 2012-2013 Lake Hartwell Marching Festival and Competition - Superior 1st Place Band in Class AA
- 2012-2013 Armuchee Invitational Marching Festival and Competition - Superior, Class AA: Band, Percussion, and Color Guard; Class AA: Percussion 3rd, Flagline 2nd
- 2011-2012 Lake Lanier Tournament of Bands - Superior, Class AA: Band, Percussion, Drum Major, and Color Guard; Class AA: Band 2nd, Percussion 1st, Drum major 1st, and Color Guard 1st; Silver Division: Percussion 1st, Drum Major 1st, and Color Guard 1st
- 2011-2012 Greater Atlanta Area Marching Contest - Superior, Class AA: Band, Percussion, Drum Major, and Color Guard; Class AA: Band 1st, Percussion 2nd, Drum major 1st, and Color Guard 1st; Grand Champions Silver Division
- 2010-2011 Heart of Georgia - Superior, Class AA: Band, Percussion, Drum Major and Color Guard; Champion, AA Division; Contest: Best Effects; Contest: Best Visual; Contest: Grand Champion over 20 bands, 10 of which were 3AA or larger
- 2010-2011 Georgia Tournament of Champions - Superior, Class AA, Band, Percussion, Color Guard, and Drum Major; Grand Champion, Silver Division
- 2009-2010 Peachtree Ridge Festival - Large Group - Superior, Class AAA
- 2009-2010 Lake Lanier Tournament - Superior, Class AAA, All categories, Grand Champion, Drum Major
- 2009-2010 Greater Atlanta Marching Contest - Superior, Class AAA, All Categories
- 2008-2009 Greater Atlanta Marching Contest - Superior, Class AAA
- 2008-2009 Georgia Bandmasters - Superior Class AAA - all categories, Grand Champions, Silver Division
- 2008-2009 UGA Festival - Large Group Performance - Superior
- 2007-2008 Fort Mountain Marching Contest - Superior
- 2006-2007 Greater Atlanta Area Marching Band Contest - Superior; 1st Place Band - Class AA
- 2005-2006 Yellow Jacket Classic - Superior
- 2005-2006 Fort Mountain Marching Contest - Superior; 1st Place Band - Class AA
- 2004-2005 Georgia Mountain Marching Festival - Superior

North Oconee's concert band consists of brass, woodwind, and percussion instruments. The concert band classes will rehearse music, preparing for concerts throughout the semester. As well as concerts, the band also participates in GMEA LGPE (Large Group Performance Evaluation), where the band's performance will be adjudicated and rated. Recently, the concert band has been split into a 'Symphonic Band' and a 'Wind Ensemble' due to an abundance of students registered in a concert band class.

== Feeder schools ==
- Middle schools
  - Malcom Bridge Middle School
  - Dove Creek Middle School
- Elementary schools
  - Malcom Bridge Elementary
  - Rocky Branch Elementary
  - High Shoals Elementary
  - Dove Creek Elementary

== Notable alumni ==
- Khalil Barnes (2023), College Football Safety for the Georgia Bulldogs
- Khamari Brooks (2026), College Football Outside Linebacker for the Georgia Bulldogs
- Bubba Chandler (2021), Pitcher for the Pittsburgh Pirates - Drafted in the 3rd Round pick in the 2021 MLB Draft
- Dallas Dickerson (2026), College Football Wide Receiver for the Georgia Bulldogs
- Kumar Rocker (2018), Pitcher for the Texas Rangers - Drafted as the 3rd overall pick in the 2022 MLB Draft
- Landon Roldan (2024), College Football Wide Receiver for the Georgia Bulldogs
- Joe Scelfo (2012), NFL player
- John Wes Townley (2008), Former NASCAR Driver
