= Westminster Christian Academy (Georgia) =

Christian school in Watkinsville, Georgia, US

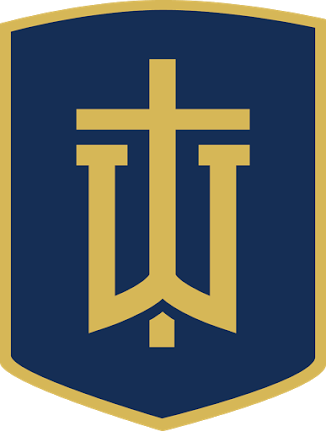

Location
- 1640 New High Shoals Road; Watkinsville, Georgia 30677; United States; 33.8490902°N 83.43025085°W

Information
- Type: Private
- Religious affiliation: Christian
- Denomination: Non Denominational
- Established: 1989
- CEEB code: 113196
- NCES School ID: A9102257
- Headmaster: Jared Clark
- Enrollment: 400 Students
- Color
- Nickname: Lions, Lady Lions
- Lower School Principal: Tiffany Rasmussen
- Upper School Principal: Steve Crouse
- Website: www.wcalions.org

Westminster Christian Academy (WCA) is a K–12, private, college preparatory Christian school. Its campus is located at 1640 New High Shoals Road in Watkinsville, Oconee County, Georgia, United States.

== History ==
Westminster Christian Academy was founded in the Fall of 1989. The school's initial class consisted of 10 first, second, and third grade students meeting in rented space at Faith Presbyterian Church in Watkinsville, and taught by Karen Schaefer. The school grew alongside the oldest students in this first class, adding a new grade level after each school year.

In 1994, enrollment outgrew the capacity of its facilities at Faith Presbyterian. As a result, the school's lower grades (K-4) remained at Faith, and the higher grades (5–8, the highest grade offered at the time) moved to facilities at Watkinsville First Baptist Church. WCA's first high school class graduated in the Spring of 1999.

The school completed the first phase of development at its present location, a 30-acre (120,000 m^{2}) site in Oconee County, in the Fall of 1998. An additional expansion was planned that would add a new gymnasium and bring the school's capacity to 500 students. In 2018, another expansion was planned to make new 6-12th grade classrooms that bring the capacity of the school to 750.

== Academics ==
The school's enrollment grew to over 400 students across all grades for the 2024–2025 academic year.

WCA's facilities include an administration building, which also houses the Tech Lab, the art room, and the music room. WCA's campus has a lower-school building, which houses Pre-K through Fifth grade, and an upper-school building with a gymnasium and a weight room, which houses the Middle School and the High School. The campus has a field house containing two class rooms and an office, and numerous athletic fields.

Uniforms are required for all K-12 students, and a chapel is held every Friday.

WCA is accredited by the Georgia Accrediting Commission and has a dual accreditation with the Southern Association of Independent Schools and the Southern Association of Colleges and Schools.

== Athletics ==
WCA's athletics teams compete in Region 1-A of the Georgia Association of Private and Parochial Schools(GAPPS). The school sponsors teams in the following sports:

- Baseball
- Basketball
- Cheerleading
- Cross country
- Soccer
- Swimming
- Volleyball
- Tennis
- Golf
- Football

The school claims that nearly 80% of the student body participates in an officially sanctioned sport. The school previously had a football team, but cut it because of budget. WCA brought back football to the school during the 2022–2023 school year. One of the most successful athletic programs at WCA, the men's soccer team won state championship titles in 2018 and 2023 and has won back to back region victories for the past eight years.

== Academic Student Activities ==
- National Honor Society (10th-12th)
- Mock Trial (9th-12th)
- Lions Lead (Lions lead is a replacement for the traditional student government) (9th-12th)
- One-Act (9th-12th)
- Y-Club (8th-12th)
- Literary (7th-12th)
- Chapel Band (6th-12th)
- Geography Bee (6th-8th)
- Spelling Bee (1st-8th)
- Quiz Bowl (6th-12th)
- Math Bowl
- History bowl
- 4-H Club (5th grade only)
- Middle school robotics club (6th-8th)
