= Winterville, Georgia =

City in Georgia, United States

- City
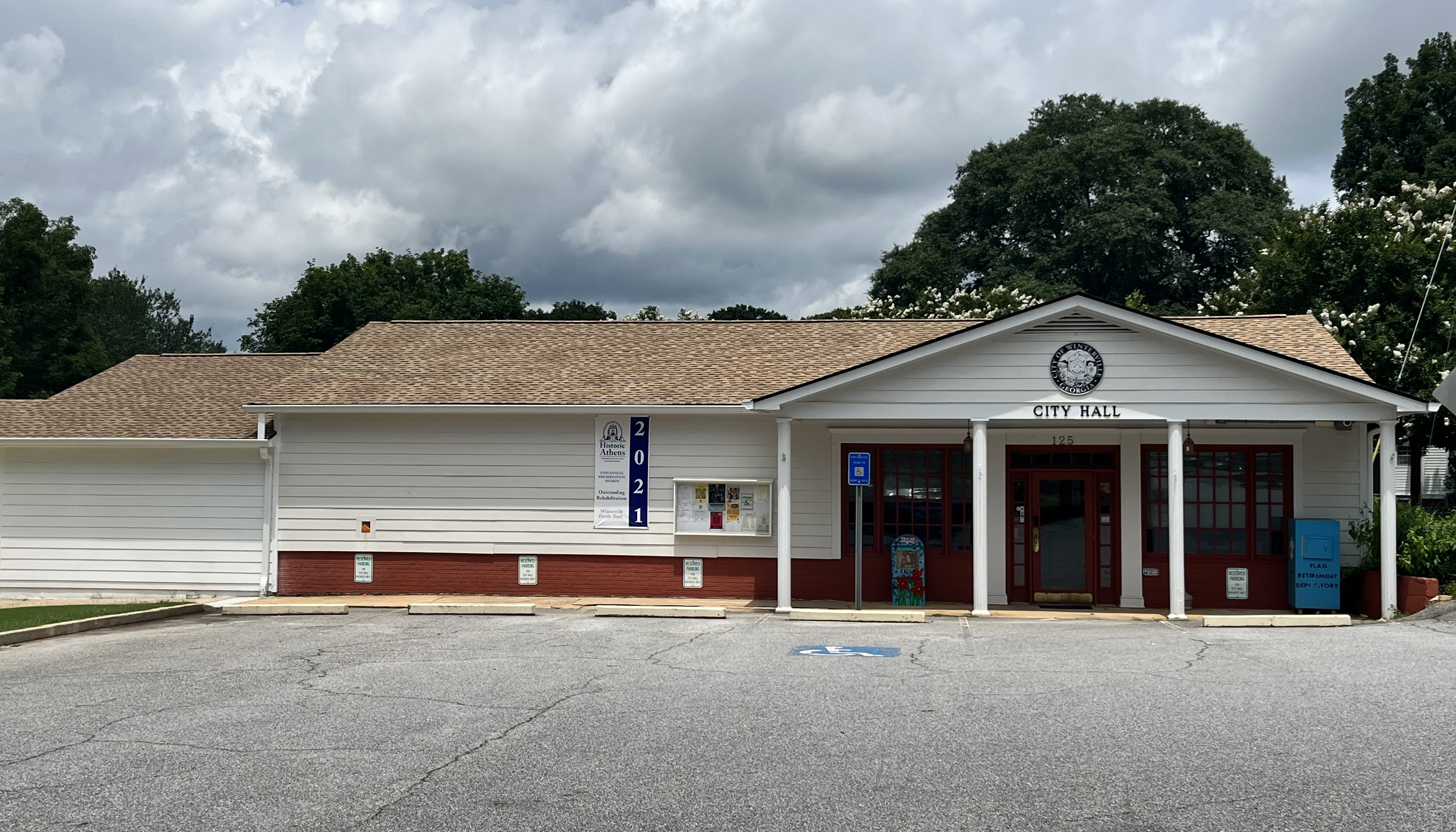
- Winterville City Hall

- Seal
- Nicknames: The Marigold Capital of Georgia, the Friendship City
- Location in Clarke County and the state of Georgia
- Coordinates: 33°58′00″N 83°16′53″W
- Country: United States
- State: Georgia
- County: Clarke
- Incorporated: 1904

Government
  - Mayor: Dodd Ferrelle

Area
  - Total: 2.64 sq mi (6.85 km^{2})
  - Land: 2.62 sq mi (6.78 km^{2})
  - Water: 0.027 sq mi (0.07 km^{2})
- Elevation: 797 ft (243 m)

Population (2020)
  - Total: 1,201
  - Density: 458.5/sq mi (177.01/km^{2})
- Time zone: UTC-5 (Eastern (EST))
  - Summer (DST): UTC-4 (EDT)
- ZIP code: 30683
- Area code: 706
- FIPS code: 13-83728
- GNIS feature ID: 2405776
- Website: cityofwinterville.com

Winterville is a city in Clarke County, Georgia, United States. The population was 1,201 at the 2020 census.

== History ==
The community was named after John Winter, a railroad official. Winterville was incorporated in 1904.

Since 1991, when the City of Athens dissolved its city charter to form the unified government of Athens-Clarke County, Winterville has been the only municipality located wholly within Athens-Clarke County.

As of 2024, Athens-Clarke County has converted 1.1 miles (1.8 km) of the abandoned Athens-to—Savannah railroad spur into a paved walking trail titled "Firefly Trail". It will eventually connect to the Georgia Hi–Lo Trail, which will become the longest paved trail and longest arboretum in the United States.

== Geography ==
Winterville is located at 33°58′00″N 83°16′54″W, a 6-mile (10 km)–drive from the University of Georgia. According to the United States Census Bureau, the city has a total area of 2.7 square miles (7.0 km^{2}), all land.

=== Climate ===
Climate data for Winterville, Georgia, 1991–2020 normals, extremes 1999–2021
| Month | Jan | Feb | Mar | Apr | May | Jun | Jul | Aug | Sep | Oct | Nov | Dec | Year |
|---|---|---|---|---|---|---|---|---|---|---|---|---|---|
| Record high °F (°C) | 79 (26) | 80 (27) | 89 (32) | 91 (33) | 98 (37) | 107 (42) | 106 (41) | 101 (38) | 97 (36) | 97 (36) | 83 (28) | 78 (26) | 107 (42) |
| Mean maximum °F (°C) | 70.3 (21.3) | 74.7 (23.7) | 83.2 (28.4) | 85.9 (29.9) | 89.3 (31.8) | 95.3 (35.2) | 95.2 (35.1) | 94.5 (34.7) | 90.9 (32.7) | 84.7 (29.3) | 76.9 (24.9) | 72.7 (22.6) | 97.0 (36.1) |
| Mean daily maximum °F (°C) | 54.0 (12.2) | 57.7 (14.3) | 66.3 (19.1) | 73.7 (23.2) | 79.6 (26.4) | 85.4 (29.7) | 88.3 (31.3) | 87.1 (30.6) | 82.0 (27.8) | 72.9 (22.7) | 63.1 (17.3) | 55.9 (13.3) | 72.2 (22.3) |
| Daily mean °F (°C) | 41.8 (5.4) | 45.1 (7.3) | 52.5 (11.4) | 60.2 (15.7) | 67.3 (19.6) | 74.5 (23.6) | 77.8 (25.4) | 76.8 (24.9) | 71.2 (21.8) | 60.6 (15.9) | 50.6 (10.3) | 44.1 (6.7) | 60.2 (15.7) |
| Mean daily minimum °F (°C) | 29.5 (−1.4) | 32.5 (0.3) | 38.7 (3.7) | 46.7 (8.2) | 55.0 (12.8) | 63.7 (17.6) | 67.2 (19.6) | 66.5 (19.2) | 60.4 (15.8) | 48.3 (9.1) | 38.0 (3.3) | 32.3 (0.2) | 48.2 (9.0) |
| Mean minimum °F (°C) | 16.7 (−8.5) | 21.1 (−6.1) | 25.9 (−3.4) | 33.3 (0.7) | 43.1 (6.2) | 56.9 (13.8) | 60.9 (16.1) | 61.3 (16.3) | 50.5 (10.3) | 35.5 (1.9) | 26.0 (−3.3) | 22.3 (−5.4) | 15.6 (−9.1) |
| Record low °F (°C) | 7 (−14) | 13 (−11) | 19 (−7) | 25 (−4) | 37 (3) | 45 (7) | 55 (13) | 55 (13) | 39 (4) | 27 (−3) | 18 (−8) | 14 (−10) | 7 (−14) |
| Average precipitation inches (mm) | 4.76 (121) | 4.73 (120) | 4.78 (121) | 3.65 (93) | 3.93 (100) | 4.62 (117) | 4.32 (110) | 4.77 (121) | 4.34 (110) | 3.32 (84) | 3.85 (98) | 4.71 (120) | 51.78 (1,315) |
| Average snowfall inches (cm) | 0.1 (0.25) | 0.4 (1.0) | 0.0 (0.0) | 0.0 (0.0) | 0.0 (0.0) | 0.0 (0.0) | 0.0 (0.0) | 0.0 (0.0) | 0.0 (0.0) | 0.0 (0.0) | 0.0 (0.0) | 0.1 (0.25) | 0.6 (1.5) |
| Average precipitation days (≥ 0.01 in) | 10.1 | 10.3 | 10.3 | 8.5 | 8.3 | 10.8 | 10.9 | 9.6 | 7.9 | 6.5 | 8.2 | 10.6 | 112.0 |
| Average snowy days (≥ 0.1 in) | 0.2 | 0.4 | 0.1 | 0.0 | 0.0 | 0.0 | 0.0 | 0.0 | 0.0 | 0.0 | 0.0 | 0.1 | 0.8 |
Source 1: NOAA
Source 2: National Weather Service (mean maxima/minima 2006–2020)

== Demographics ==
Historical population
| Census | Pop. | Note | %± |
|---|---|---|---|
| 1910 | 465 | | — |
| 1920 | 504 | | 8.4% |
| 1930 | 432 | | −14.3% |
| 1940 | 503 | | 16.4% |
| 1950 | 453 | | −9.9% |
| 1960 | 497 | | 9.7% |
| 1970 | 551 | | 10.9% |
| 1980 | 621 | | 12.7% |
| 1990 | 876 | | 41.1% |
| 2000 | 1,068 | | 21.9% |
| 2010 | 1,122 | | 5.1% |
| 2020 | 1,201 | | 7.0% |
U.S. Decennial Census

=== 2020 census ===
As of the 2020 census, Winterville had a population of 1,201. The median age was 45.3 years. 19.2% of residents were under the age of 18 and 22.4% of residents were 65 years of age or older. For every 100 females there were 90.0 males, and for every 100 females age 18 and over there were 88.2 males age 18 and over.

88.3% of residents lived in urban areas, while 11.7% lived in rural areas.

There were 500 households in Winterville, of which 31.8% had children under the age of 18 living in them. Of all households, 54.2% were married-couple households, 15.0% were households with a male householder and no spouse or partner present, and 26.2% were households with a female householder and no spouse or partner present. About 21.0% of all households were made up of individuals and 11.4% had someone living alone who was 65 years of age or older.

There were 536 housing units, of which 6.7% were vacant. The homeowner vacancy rate was 0.5% and the rental vacancy rate was 2.1%.

Winterville racial composition as of 2020
| Race | Num. | Perc. |
|---|---|---|
| White (non-Hispanic) | 832 | 69.28% |
| Black or African American (non-Hispanic) | 220 | 18.32% |
| Asian | 21 | 1.75% |
| Pacific Islander | 1 | 0.08% |
| Other/Mixed | 46 | 3.83% |
| Hispanic or Latino | 81 | 6.74% |

== Amenities ==
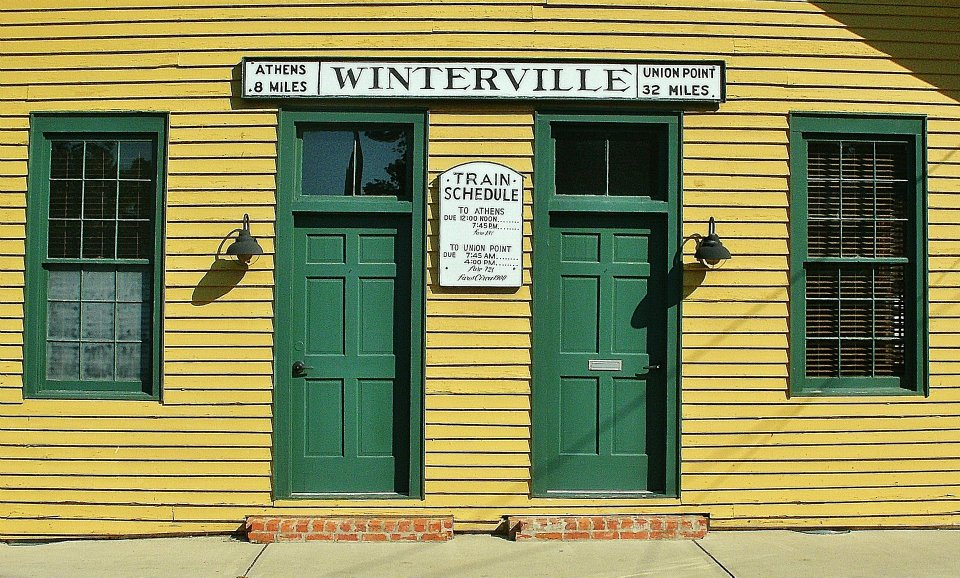
Community Center

Winterville's Marigold Auditorium for Arts and Culture, built in 1953, fell into disrepair later in the 20th century. It has since been renovated. The original auditorium burned down on its opening night in the early 1900s.

The village's Cultural Center is located in the former high-school building, built in 1956. The original high school was built at the same time as the auditorium.

Winterville Community Center is located in a former Georgia Railroad train depot, which was built in the late 19th century.

== Education ==
All of Clarke County is in the Clarke County School District.

Zoned schools for Winterville include Winterville Elementary School, W. R. Coile Middle School, and Cedar Shoals High School.

== Notable people ==
In the late 1980s, members of the neo-psychedelia rock band Butthole Surfers lived in Winterville, where they recorded their infamous third full-length LP, Locust Abortion Technician in a tiny two-bedroom home studio they rented during the summer of 1986.
