= West Weeks =

American football player (born 2002)

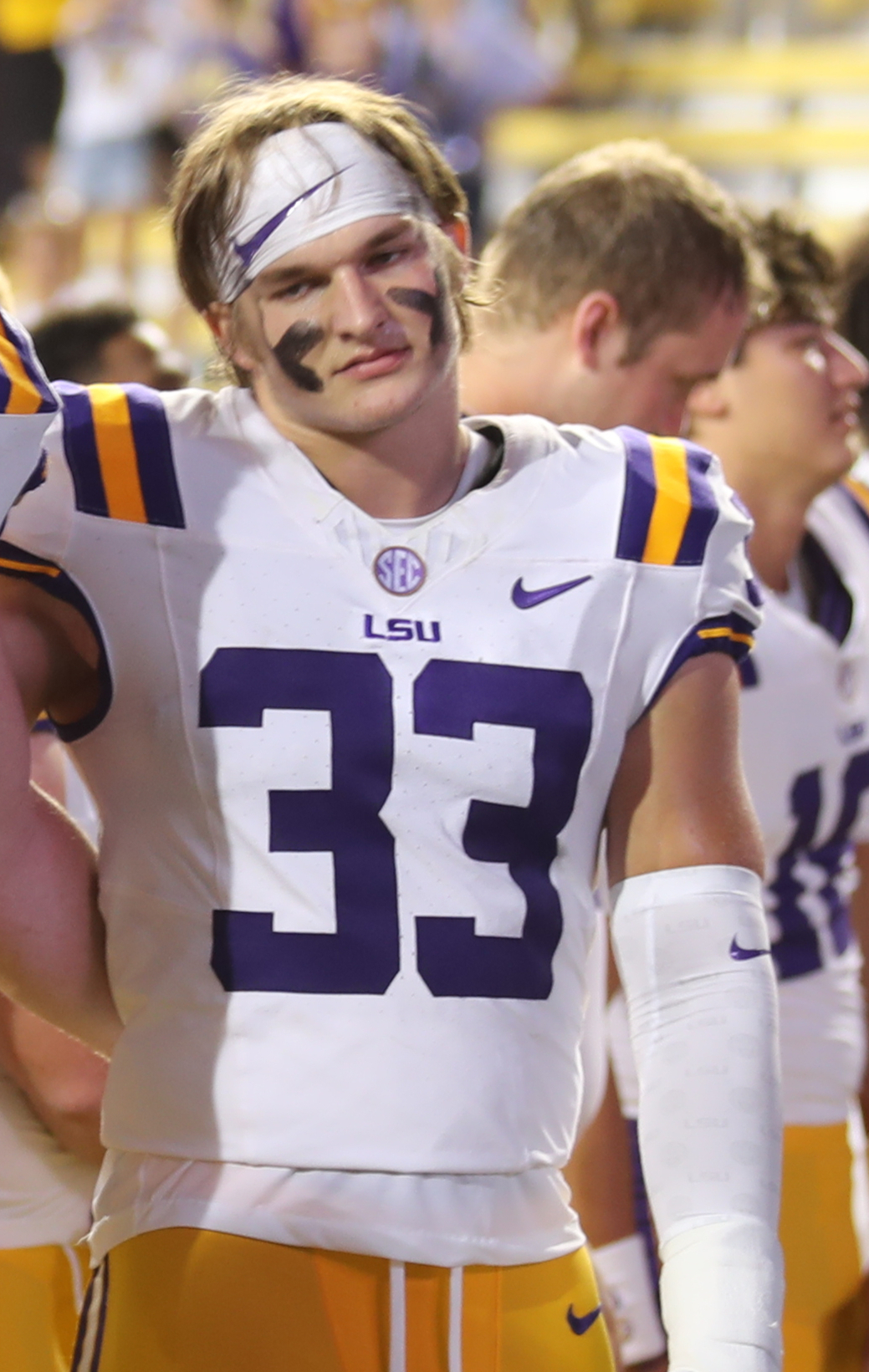

No. 47 – Indianapolis Colts
- Position: Linebacker
- Roster status: Active

Personal information
- Born: August 13, 2002 (age 24); Watkinsville, Georgia, U.S.
- Listed height: 6 ft 2 in (1.88 m)
- Listed weight: 230 lb (104 kg)

Career information
- High school: Oconee County (Watkinsville, Georgia)
- College: Virginia (2021); LSU (2022–2025)
- NFL draft: 2026: undrafted

Career history
- Indianapolis Colts (2026–present)
- Stats at Pro Football Reference

West Weeks (born August 13, 2002) is an American professional football linebacker for the Indianapolis Colts of the National Football League (NFL). He played college football for the Virginia Cavaliers and LSU Tigers.

== Early life ==
Weeks attended Oconee County High School in Watkinsville, Georgia, and committed to play college football for the Virginia Cavaliers.

== College career ==
=== Virginia ===
As a freshman in 2021, Weeks recorded 31 tackles, a sack, and five pass deflections in 11 games. After the conclusion of the season, he entered the NCAA transfer portal.

=== LSU ===
Weeks transferred to play for the LSU Tigers. In four seasons (one as a starter) at LSU from 2022 to 2025, he totaled 133 tackles with 11.5 going for a loss, four sacks, and a forced fumble. After the 2025 season, Weeks declared for the NFL draft, while also accepting an invite to participate in the 2026 East-West Shrine Bowl.

== Professional career ==
Pre-draft measurables
Height	Weight	Arm length	Hand span	Wingspan	40-yard dash	10-yard split	20-yard split	20-yard shuttle	Three-cone drill	Vertical jump	Broad jump	Bench press
6 ft 1 3/4 in (1.87 m)	230 lb (104 kg)	30 1/4 in (0.77 m)	9 1/4 in (0.23 m)	6 ft 4 1/8 in (1.93 m)	4.57 s	1.55 s	2.58 s	4.51 s	7.10 s	31.5 in (0.80 m)	9 ft 3 in (2.82 m)	19 reps
All values from Pro Day

After not being selected in the 2026 NFL draft, Weeks signed with the Indianapolis Colts as an undrafted free agent. Weeks was waived by Indianapolis on August 30, 2026, as a part of final roster cuts; he was re-signed to the team's practice squad the following day. He was promoted to the active roster on November 14.

== Personal life ==
Weeks is the older brother of LSU linebackers Whit and Zach.
