= Khamari Brooks =

American football player

No. 15 – Georgia Bulldogs
- Position: Outside linebacker
- Class: Freshman

Personal information
- Listed height: 6 ft 3 in (1.91 m)
- Listed weight: 245 lb (111 kg)

Career information
- High school: North Oconee (Bogart, Georgia)
- College: Georgia (2026–present)
- Stats at ESPN

Khamari Brooks is an American college football outside linebacker for the Georgia Bulldogs.

== Early life ==
Brooks attended North Oconee High School in Bogart, Georgia, where he played linebacker and tight end. As a junior, he was named the Class 4A Region 8 Defensive Player of the Year, and GACA Class 4A Regions 5-8 Defensive Player of the Year after recording 131 tackles, 13 sacks, one interception and defensive touchdowns. He added 31 receptions for 569 yards and nine touchdowns on offense. He was also named the MVP of the GHSA Class 4A State Championship that season. As a senior, Brooks had 56 tackles with two sacks on defense and 12 receptions for 246 yards and 4 touchdowns before a hip injury ended his season. He committed to the University of Georgia to play college football.

== College career ==
Brooks earned playing time his freshman year at Georgia in 2026, and had his first career sack against the Ole Miss Rebels.
