= Khalil Barnes =

American football player (born 2005)

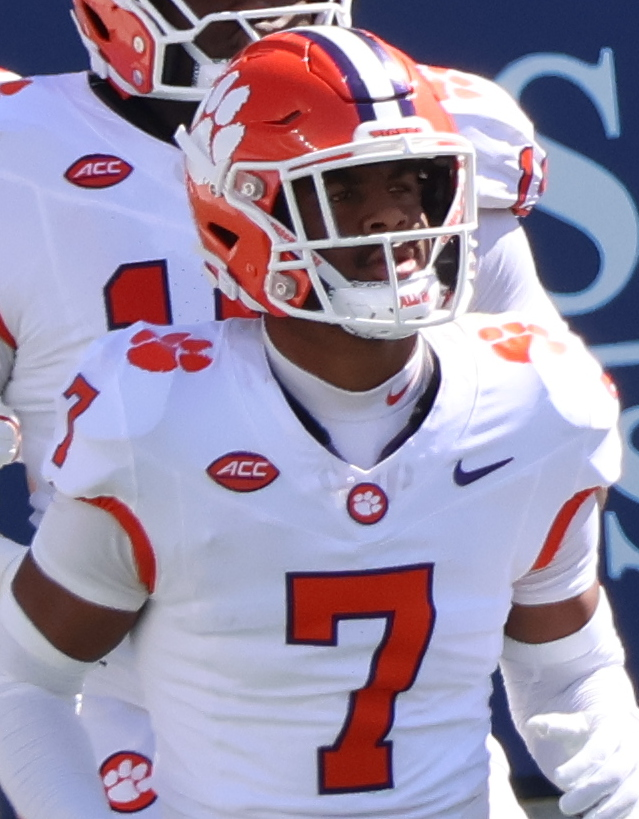
- Barnes with the Clemson Tigers in 2025

No. 7 – Georgia Bulldogs
- Position: Safety
- Class: Senior

Personal information
- Born: February 28, 2005 (age 21)
- Listed height: 6 ft 0 in (1.83 m)
- Listed weight: 200 lb (91 kg)

Career information
- High school: North Oconee (Bogart, Georgia)
- College: Clemson (2023–2025); Georgia (2026–present)
- Stats at ESPN

Khalil Barnes (born February 28, 2005) is an American college football safety for the Georgia Bulldogs of the Southeastern Conference (SEC). He previously played for the Clemson Tigers.

== Early life ==
Barnes attended North Oconee High School in Bogart, Georgia. At the end of his sophomore season, he suffered a torn ACL. As a junior, Barnes notched 33 tackles with three being for a loss, and three interceptions.

=== Recruiting ===
Barnes received offers from schools such as Austin Peay, Army, Georgia State, East Carolina, Georgia Tech, Clemson, and Tennessee. He initially committed to play college football for the Wake Forest Demon Deacons. However he later re-opened his recruiting, announcing his top 3 as Clemson, Notre Dame, and Oklahoma. Ultimately, Barnes committed to play college football for the Clemson Tigers.

== College career ==
In week 2 of the 2023 season, Barnes recorded his first career interception in a victory over Florida Atlantic. In week 6, he notched a forced fumble in a win versus Wake Forest. In the 2023 regular season finale, Barnes returned a recovered fumble 42 yards for a touchdown, while also recording an interception, in a victory versus South Carolina. He finished his freshman season in 2023 with 41 tackles with five being for a loss, a sack, six pass deflections, three interceptions, and three forced fumbles, earning freshman all-American honors. During the 2024 season, Barnes totaled 61 tackles with one being for a loss, three pass deflections, and four interceptions.

On January 4, 2026, Barnes announced his decision to transfer to the University of Georgia to play for the Georgia Bulldogs.

=== College statistics ===
Year	Team	Class	GP	Tackles					Interceptions					Fumbles	
Year	Team	Class	GP	Solo	Ast	Tot	Loss	Sk	Int	Yds	Avg	TD	PD	FF	FR
2023	Clemson	FR	13	33	5	38	5.0	1.0	3	4	1.3	0	6	3	1
2024	Clemson	SO	14	36	25	61	0.5	0.0	4	0	0.0	0	3	3	2
2025	Clemson	JR	10	24	16	40	1.0	0.0	0	0	—	0	2	0	0
2026	Georgia	SR	8	17	8	25		1	0	0	—	0	7		
Career			37	93	46	139	6.5	1.0	7	4	0.6	0	11	3	1
