= Whit Weeks =

American football player (born 2005)

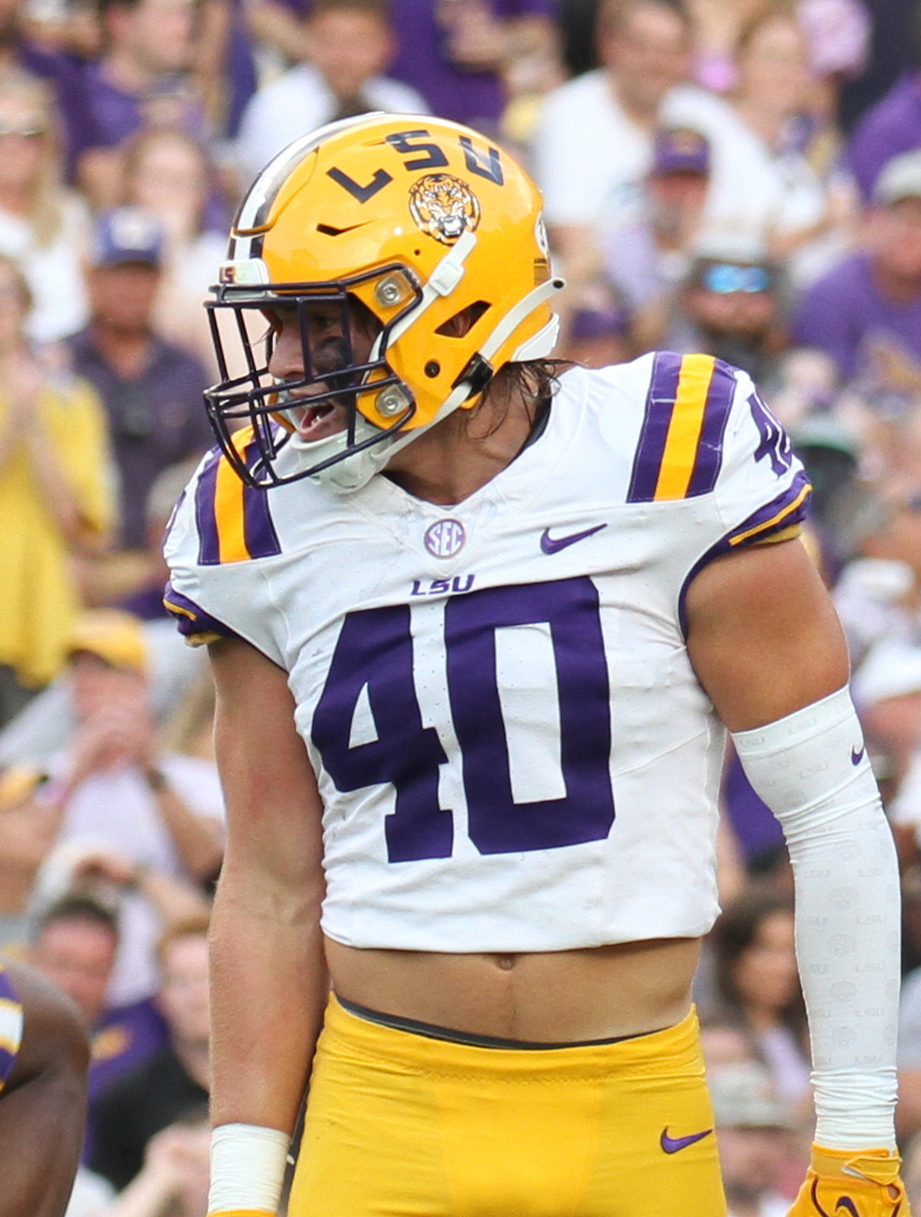

No. 7 – LSU Tigers
- Position: Linebacker
- Class: Senior

Personal information
- Born: January 7, 2005 (age 21)
- Listed height: 6 ft 2 in (1.88 m)
- Listed weight: 223 lb (101 kg)

Career information
- High school: Oconee County (Watkinsville, Georgia)
- College: LSU (2023–present)

Awards and highlights
- First-team All-SEC (2024)
- Stats at ESPN

Whit Weeks (born January 7, 2005) is an American college football linebacker for the LSU Tigers.

== Early life ==
Weeks attended Oconee County High School in Watkinsville, Georgia. As a senior, he racked up 104 tackles, two sacks, and three interceptions on his way to being named Region 8-3A Player of the Year. He committed to Louisiana State University (LSU) to play college football.

== College career ==
As a true freshman at LSU in 2023, Weeks played in 11 games with three starts and had 50 tackles and 0.5 sacks.

Weeks entered his sophomore year in 2024 as a starter. Against the Ole Miss Rebels, he had 18 tackles and one sack. In 13 total games during the season, Weeks recorded 125 combined tackles, 3.5 sacks, 1 interception, 3 pass deflections, and 2 forced fumbles. On January 2, 2025, Weeks underwent surgery to repair a broken fibula that he suffered in the 2024 Texas Bowl.

=== Statistics ===
Season	Team	GP	Tackles					Def Interceptions					Fumbles			
Season	Team	GP	Solo	Ast	Comb	TFL	Sk	Int	Yds	Avg	TD	PD	FR	Yds	TD	FF
2023	LSU	11	15	34	49	3.5	0.5	0	0	0	0	0	0	0	0	0
2024	LSU	13	61	64	125	10.0	3.5	1	5	5.0	0	3	0	0	0	2
2025	LSU	8	14	17	31	3.0	1.0	0	0	0	0	0	1	0	0	0
2026	LSU	2	6	7	13	1.5	0.0	0	0	0	0	0	0	0	0	0
Career		34	96	122	218	18.0	5.0	1	5	5.0	0	3	1	0	0	2

== Personal life ==
Weeks is the brother of LSU linebackers West and Zach.
