= Russ Callaway =

American football player and coach

Tulane Green Wave
- Title: Offensive coordinator

Personal information
- Born: Auburn, Alabama, U.S.

Career information
- High school: Oconee County (Watkinsville, Georgia)
- College: Valdosta State (2007–2009)

Career history
- Alabama (2011–2012) Defensive analyst; Murray State (2013–2014) Wide receivers coach & recruiting coordinator; Samford (2015–2019); Wide receivers coach & pass game coordinator (2015); Offensive coordinator, quarterbacks coach & pass game coordinator (2016–2017); Offensive coordinator & quarterbacks coach (2018–2019); LSU (2020) Senior offensive assistant & analyst; New York Giants (2021) Offensive quality control coach; Florida (2022–2025); Defensive intern (2022); Tight ends coach (2023); Co-offensive coordinator & tight ends coach (2024); Offensive coordinator & tight ends coach (2025); Tulane (2026–present) Offensive coordinator

Awards and highlights
- National champion (2011, 2012)

Russ Callaway is an American football coach who is currently the offensive coordinator for Tulane.

== Coaching career ==
Callaway got his first career coaching job as a defensive analyst for the Alabama Crimson Tide. He was part of the Alabama coaching staffs that won the National Championship ifor the 2011 and 2012 seasons. In 2013, Callaway was hired by the Murray State Racers to serve as the teams wide receiver coach and recruiting coordinator. In 2015, Callaway decided to join the Samford Bulldogs as the teams wide receivers coach. In 2016, Callaway became the offensive coordinator for Samford. For the 2020 season, Callaway was hired by the LSU Tigers to serve as an analyst. In 2021, Callaway joined the New York Giants as an offensive assistant. In 2022, Callaway joined the Florida Gators as a defensive intern. For the 2023 season, Callaway was promoted by the Gators to coach the teams tight ends. In 2024, Callaway was once again promoted by Florida this time to be the team's co-offensive coordinator and tight ends coach.

== Personal life ==
Callaway is the son of former UAB head coach Neil Callaway.
