= Elder, Georgia =

Unincorporated community in Georgia, U.S.

Coordinates: 33°46′05″N 83°20′50″W

Elder is an unincorporated community in Oconee County, in the U.S. state of Georgia.

== History ==
A post office called Elder was established in 1886, and remained in operation until 1904. A variant name was "Goshen".
