= DeDe Lattimore =

American football player (born 1991)

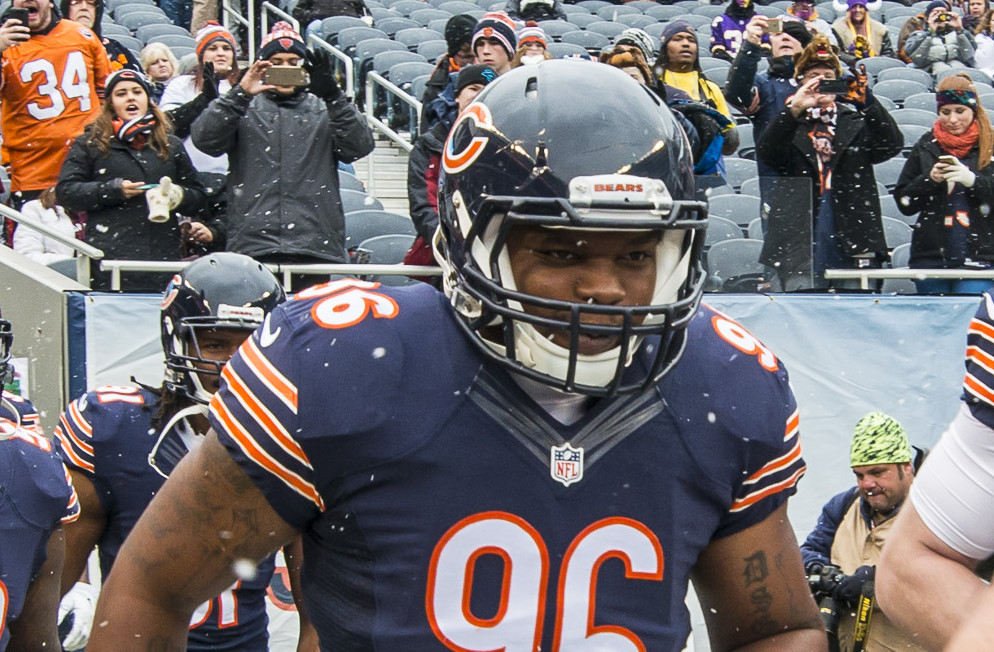
- Lattimore playing for the Bears in 2014

No. 91, 43, 96
- Position: Linebacker

Personal information
- Born: January 30, 1991 (age 35); Athens, Georgia, U.S.
- Listed height: 6 ft 1 in (1.85 m)
- Listed weight: 237 lb (108 kg)

Career information
- High school: Cedar Shoals (Athens)
- College: South Florida
- NFL draft: 2014: undrafted

Career history
- Chicago Bears (2014); Saskatchewan Roughriders (2016)*
- * Offseason or practice squad member only

Awards and highlights
- Second-team All-AAC (2013); Second-team All-Big East (2011)

Career NFL statistics
- Total tackles: 3
- Stats at Pro Football Reference

Devekeyan "DeDe" Lattimore (born January 30, 1991) is an American former professional football player who was a linebacker in the National Football League (NFL). He played college football for the South Florida Bulls. He has been a member of the Chicago Bears and Saskatchewan Roughriders.

== Early life ==
Lattimore played running back and linebacker at Cedar Shoals High School. in Athens, Georgia. He recorded 96 tackles, four sacks and four forced fumbles his senior year. He was also named to the 2008 Georgia All-Star team and the All-Northeast Georgia team. Lattimore earned two Defensive Player of the Year honors in Region 8-AAAA. He rushed 88 times for 857 yards and six touchdowns his junior year. He also recorded 118 total tackles, 15 sacks and 18 quarterback hurries in 10 games.

== College career ==
Lattimore played at the University of South Florida for the Bulls from 2010 to 2013. He was redshirted in 2009. In 2010, he was named a Freshman All-American by Rivals.com. In 2011, he was named Second-team All-Big East by Athlon Sports and Phil Steele. In 2013, he earned Second-team All-AAC honors, was named USF Team MVP and was a team captain, leading the Bulls with a career-best 98 tackles.

== Professional career ==
Lattimore was rated the 14th best inside linebacker in the 2014 NFL draft by NFLDraftScout.com. The website projected that he would be drafted in the seventh round or sign as an undrafted free agent. Nolan Nawrocki of NFL.com predicted that Lattimore would go undrafted and sign as a priority free agent, stating that Lattimore was a "Tightly wound, inconsistent, two-down Mike linebacker who projects as a backup inside in a 3–4, though he will have to prove his worth on special teams to last."

Pre-draft measurables
| Height | Weight | 40-yard dash | 10-yard split | 20-yard split | 20-yard shuttle | Three-cone drill | Vertical jump | Broad jump | Bench press |
|---|---|---|---|---|---|---|---|---|---|
| 6 ft 0 in (1.83 m) | 237 lb (108 kg) | 4.63 s | 1.50 s | 2.68 s | 4.33 s | 7.16 s | 30 1/2 in (0.77 m) | 9 ft 2 in (2.79 m) | 20 reps |
All values from South Florida Pro Day

Lattimore was signed by the Chicago Bears of the National Football League (NFL) on May 11, 2014, after going undrafted in the 2014 NFL Draft. He was released by the Bears on August 31 and signed to the team's practice squad on September 1, 2014. He was released by the Bears on September 11 and re-signed to the team's practice squad on October 8, 2014. Lattimore made his NFL debut on October 12, 2014, against the Atlanta Falcons, recording one tackle. On January 30, 2015, he was resigned to a two-year deal. He was waived by the Bears on August 15, 2015.

Lattimore signed with the Saskatchewan Roughriders of the Canadian Football League on February 19, 2016. He was released by the Roughriders on April 19, 2016.
