= Zach Mettenberger =

American football player and coach (born 1991)

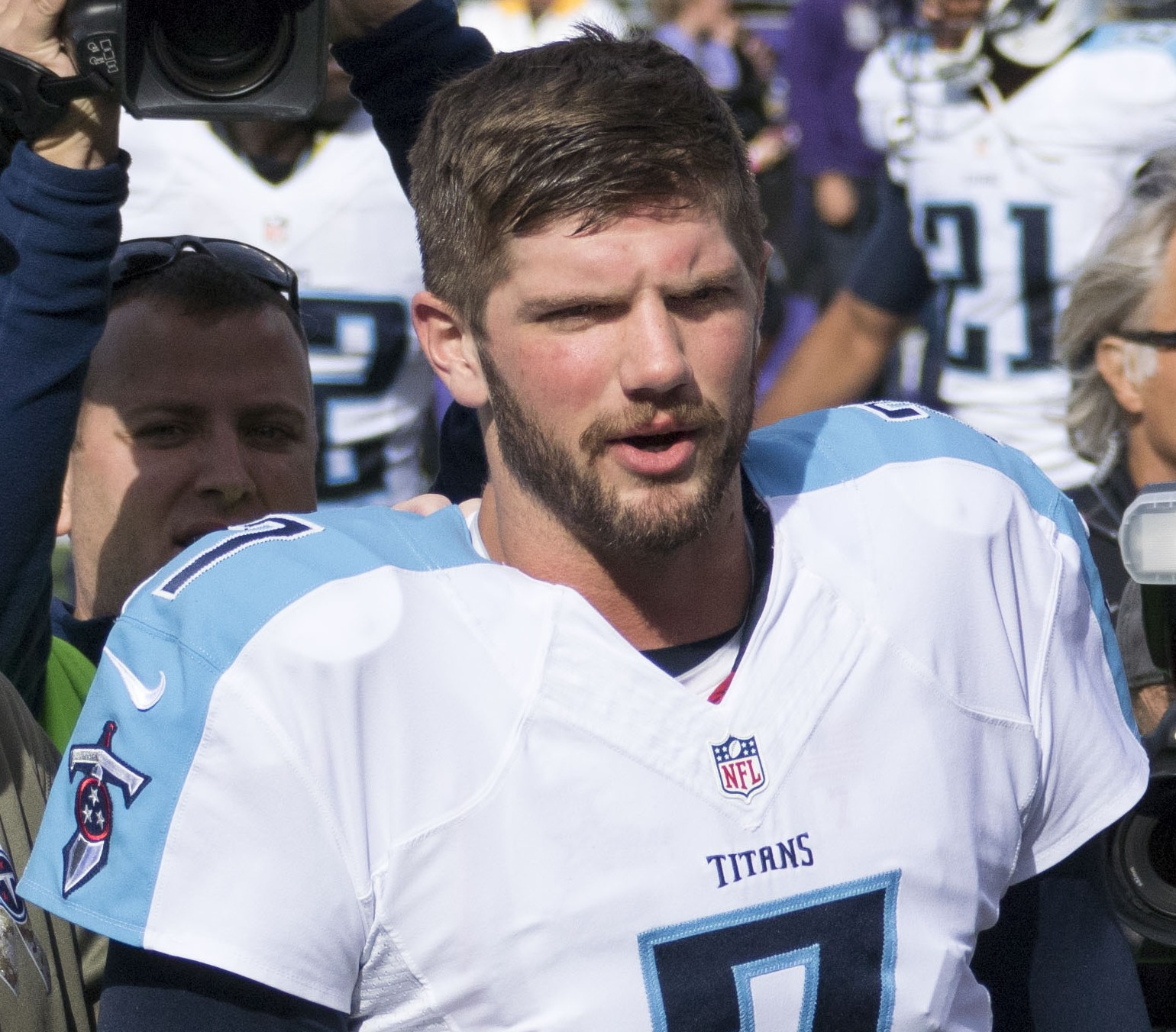
- Mettenberger with the Tennessee Titans in 2014

No. 7, 8
- Position: Quarterback

Personal information
- Born: July 16, 1991 (age 35); Athens, Georgia, U.S.
- Listed height: 6 ft 5 in (1.96 m)
- Listed weight: 223 lb (101 kg)

Career information
- High school: Oconee County (Watkinsville, Georgia)
- College: Georgia (2009); Butler CC (2010); LSU (2011–2013)
- NFL draft: 2014: 6th round, 178th overall pick

Career history

Playing
- Tennessee Titans (2014–2015); San Diego Chargers (2016)*; Pittsburgh Steelers (2016); Memphis Express (2019)
- * Offseason or practice squad member only

Coaching
- Hillsboro HS (TN) (2020) Offensive coordinator; Father Ryan HS (TN) (2021) Assistant coach; Alabama (2022–2023) Analyst; Father Ryan HS (TN) (2024) Offensive coordinator and quarterbacks coach; Father Ryan HS (TN) (2025–present) Head coach

Career NFL statistics
- Passing attempts: 345
- Passing completions: 208
- Completion percentage: 60.3%
- TD–INT: 12–14
- Passing yards: 2,347
- Passer rating: 75.4
- Stats at Pro Football Reference

Zachary Rich Mettenberger (born July 16, 1991) is an American former professional football quarterback who played in the National Football League (NFL) for three seasons, primarily with the Tennessee Titans. He played college football for the LSU Tigers and was selected by the Titans in the sixth round of the 2014 NFL draft. After two seasons in Tennessee alternating as a backup and starter, Mettenberger had an offseason stint with the San Diego Chargers before spending his final NFL year as a backup for the Pittsburgh Steelers in 2016. Mettenberger last played professionally with the Memphis Express of the Alliance of American Football (AAF) in 2019.

== Early life ==
Mettenberger attended Oconee County High School in Watkinsville, Georgia. As a senior, he threw for 2,106 yards, 19 touchdowns, and six interceptions. Mettenberger was ranked as the 11th-best pro-style quarterback recruit in his class by Rivals.com.

== College career ==
Mettenberger originally attended the University of Georgia where he redshirted the 2009 season, but was kicked off the team due to a violation of team rules. On April 30, 2010, Mettenberger pleaded guilty to two misdemeanor sexual battery charges stemming from an incident at a bar near Valdosta, Georgia.

Mettenberger transferred to Butler Community College, where he became the starter for the 2010 season. In his lone season at Butler, Mettenberger threw for 2,678 passing yards with 32 touchdowns and four interceptions. He led Butler to an 11–1 record and the JUCO National Championship game.

Prior to the 2011 season, Mettenberger transferred to Louisiana State University (LSU). In his first season at LSU, Mettenberger completed 8-of-11 pass attempts for 92 yards and a touchdown in limited action.

In 2012, Mettenberger took over as the starting quarterback. He led the team to a 10–3 record, completing 58.8% of his passes for 2,609 yards, 12 touchdowns, and seven interceptions.

With the arrival of offensive coordinator Cam Cameron in 2013, Mettenberger led LSU to a 9–3 regular season record, completing 64.9% of his passes for 3,082 yards, 22 touchdowns, and eight interceptions, with a yards-per-pass attempt of 10.41 and a quarterback rating of 171.4. Mettenberger was the first LSU quarterback to throw for 2,500+ yards in back-to-back seasons and was a two-time team captain. Mettenberger tore his ACL in LSU's final regular season game against Arkansas. He underwent surgery and 13 weeks later, Mettenberger fully participated in LSU's Pro Day. He threw nearly 125 passes while wearing a helmet and shoulder pads and completed over 90% of his passes. Mettenberger graduated from LSU in December 2013 with a degree in General Studies.

== Professional career ==
Pre-draft measurables
Height	Weight	Arm length	Hand span
6 ft 4 7/8 in (1.95 m)	224 lb (102 kg)	32 3/8 in (0.82 m)	9 3/4 in (0.25 m)
All values from NFL Combine

=== Tennessee Titans ===
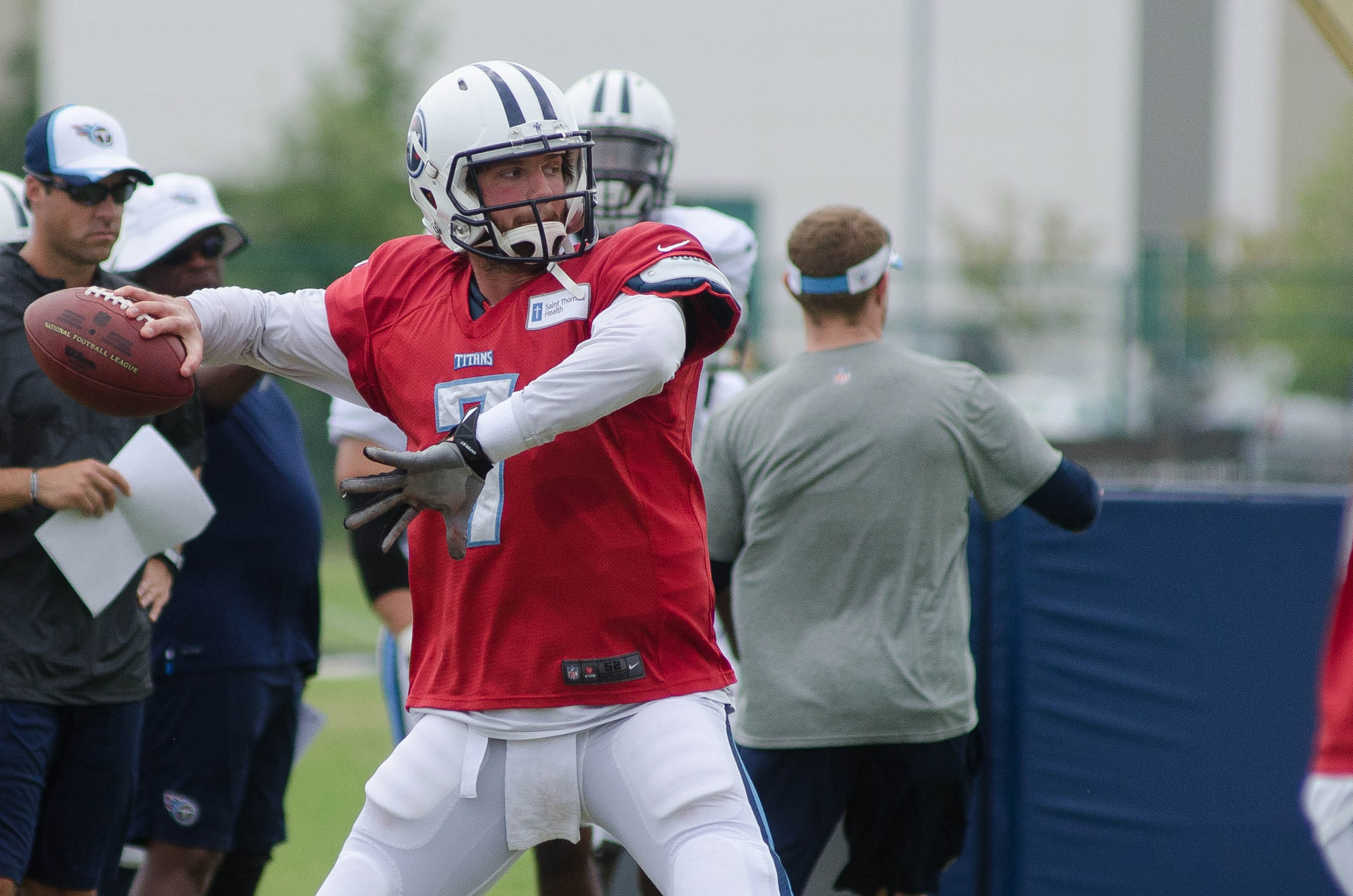
Mettenberger in 2014

Mettenberger was selected by the Tennessee Titans in the sixth round (178th overall) of the 2014 NFL draft.

On September 28, 2014, Mettenberger made his NFL debut in relief of Charlie Whitehurst in a 41–17 loss to the Indianapolis Colts, going 2-of-5 for 17 yards and an interception.

On October 22, the Titans decided that Mettenberger would start over both Jake Locker and Whitehurst against the Houston Texans. Mettenberger went 27-of-41 for 299 yards with two touchdowns and an interception in the 30–16 loss.

Mettenberger started against the Pittsburgh Steelers in his Monday Night Football debut on November 17, going 15-of-24 for two touchdowns and an interception and hitting teammate (and former Steeler) Nate Washington for an 80-yard touchdown. During a 36–7 blowout loss to the New York Giants, Mettenberger sustained a shoulder injury and missed the last three games. He finished his rookie season with eight touchdowns, seven interceptions, and 1,412 passing yards, while also rushing for four yards. He started in six games for the Titans, all losses.

In the 2015 season, Mettenberger played in seven games, starting four of them, to replace injured first-round rookie and starter Marcus Mariota. He threw for 935 yards, four touchdowns, and seven interceptions while also rushing for eight yards and a touchdown.

Mettenberger was released by the Titans on May 16, 2016.

=== San Diego Chargers ===
On May 17, 2016, Mettenberger was claimed off waivers by the San Diego Chargers. On August 30, he was released.

=== Pittsburgh Steelers ===
On August 31, 2016, Mettenberger was claimed off waivers by the Pittsburgh Steelers. He did not play in any games during the 2016 NFL season and was inactive for 12 of the Steelers' 16 regular season games, as well as all three playoff games.

Mettenberger was active for Weeks 4 and 5 (against the Kansas City Chiefs and New York Jets, respectively) as the third quarterback behind Ben Roethlisberger and Landry Jones. He was also active as the backup for Weeks 7 and 17 (against the New England Patriots and Cleveland Browns, respectively) behind Jones, while Roethlisberger recovered from an injury against the Miami Dolphins and rested for the playoffs in the regular season finale.

Following the Steelers' drafting of Joshua Dobbs in the fourth round of the 2017 NFL draft, Mettenberger was released on May 1, 2017.

=== The Spring League (first stint) ===
In 2018, Mettenberger joined The Spring League and was assigned to the West team.

=== Memphis Express ===
In August 2018, Mettenberger signed with the newly-formed Alliance of American Football's Memphis Express. On November 27, he was drafted by the Express in the fourth round of the 2019 AAF QB Draft.

Mettenberger opened the 2019 AAF season as the third-string quarterback behind Christian Hackenberg and Brandon Silvers. For their third game of the year against the Orlando Apollos, he became the backup after Silvers suffered an injury and entered the game during the second half to replace a struggling Hackenberg. Despite losing 21–17, Mettenberger threw for 120 yards and two touchdowns. On February 25, Express head coach Mike Singletary named Mettenberger the starter. In his first start against the San Diego Fleet, Mettenberger completed 18-of-25 passes for 174 yards and a passing touchdown, and made a rushing touchdown, as Memphis won 26–23, the first victory in team history.

Against the Salt Lake Stallions on March 16, Mettenberger was injured and replaced by Silvers. The Express announced the signing of quarterback Johnny Manziel soon after the game. Mettenberger was placed on injured reserve two days later.

The league ceased operations in April 2019.

=== The Spring League (second stint) ===
After being passed up in the 2020 XFL draft, Mettenberger re-signed with The Spring League as starting quarterback for the Las Vegas Hughes, the host team. He lost the starting quarterback competition against Bryan Scott.

Mettenberger was selected by the Austin Generals in The Spring League's player selection draft on October 12, 2020.

== Career statistics ==
=== NFL ===
Regular season
Year	Team	Games			Passing								Rushing				Sacks		Fumbles (Note: Fumbles lost data taken from Pro Football Reference career game log)	
Year	Team	GP	GS	Record	Cmp	Att	Pct	Yds	Y/A	TD	Int	Rtg	Att	Yds	Avg	TD	Sck	SckY	Fum	Lost
2014	TEN	7	6	0–6	107	179	59.8	1,412	7.9	8	7	83.4	5	4	0.8	0	18	138	4	2
2015	TEN	7	4	0–4	101	166	60.8	935	5.6	4	7	66.7	9	8	0.9	1	13	98	4	2
2016	PIT	0	0	DNP																
Career		14	10	0–10	208	345	60.3	2,347	6.8	12	14	75.4	14	12	0.9	1	31	236	8	4

Postseason
Year	Team	Games			Passing								Rushing				Sacks		Fumbles	
Year	Team	GP	GS	Record	Cmp	Att	Pct	Yds	Y/A	TD	Int	Rtg	Att	Yds	Avg	TD	Sck	SckY	Fum	Lost
2016	PIT	0	0	DNP																

=== AAF ===
Year	Team	Games		Passing								Rushing			
Year	Team	GP	GS	Cmp	Att	Pct	Yds	Y/A	TD	Int	Rtg	Att	Yds	Avg	TD
2019	MEM	4	3	36	54	66.7	475	8.8	3	1	105.1	7	3	0.4	2
Career		4	3	36	54	66.7	475	8.8	3	1	105.1	7	3	0.4	2

=== College ===
Season	Team	Passing								Rushing			
Season	Team	Cmp	Att	Pct	Yds	Y/A	TD	Int	Rtg	Att	Yds	Avg	TD
2011	LSU	8	11	72.7	92	8.4	1	0	173.0	2	28	14.0	0
2012	LSU	207	352	58.8	2,609	7.4	12	7	128.3	47	−208	−4.4	0
2013	LSU	192	296	64.9	3,082	10.4	22	8	171.4	34	−133	−3.9	0
Career		407	659	61.8	5,783	8.8	35	15	148.4	83	−313	−3.8	0

== Coaching career ==
In July 2020, Mettenberger was announced as the new offensive coordinator of the Hillsboro High School football team, having previously expressed interest in coaching at the school during his playing career.

In September 2021, Mettenberger was announced as an assistant football coach for Father Ryan High School.

In February 2022, Mettenberger joined the staff of the Alabama Crimson Tide as a coaching analyst. He rejoined the Father Ryan staff in 2024 as the offensive coordinator and quarterbacks coach.

On February 18, 2025, Mettenberger was announced as the new head coach at Father Ryan.
