= Clarke County School District =

School district in Georgia (U.S. state)

Address
- 595 Prince Avenue Athens, Georgia, 30601; United States
- Coordinates: 33°57′38″N 83°23′14″W

District information
- Grades: Pre-kindergarten – 12
- Superintendent: Robbie Hooker
- Accreditations: Southern Association of Colleges and Schools; Georgia Accrediting Commission

Students and staff
- Enrollment: 12,340 (2022–23)
- Faculty: 1,220.70 (FTE)
- Staff: 1,205.50 (FTE)
- Student–teacher ratio: 10.11

Other information
- Telephone: (706) 546-7721
- Website: clarke.k12.ga.us

The Clarke County School District is a public school district in Clarke County, Georgia, United States, based in Athens, Georgia. It serves Clarke County, which includes the communities of Athens and Winterville, and part of Bogart.

== Schools ==
The Clarke County School District operates fourteen elementary schools, four middle schools, and three high schools (one non-traditional).

=== Elementary schools ===
- Barnett Shoals Elementary School
- Bettye Henderson Holston Elementary School
- David C. Barrow Elementary School
- Cleveland Road Elementary School
- Fowler Drive Elementary School
- Gaines Elementary School
- J.J. Harris Elementary Charter School
- Johnnie Lay Burks Elementary School
- Oglethorpe Avenue Elementary School
- Howard B. Stroud Elementary School
- Timothy Road Elementary School
- Whit Davis Road Elementary School
- Whitehead Road Elementary School
- Winterville Elementary School

=== Middle schools ===
- Burney-Harris-Lyons Middle School
- Clarke Middle School
- W.R. Coile Middle School
- Hilsman Middle School

=== High schools ===
- Cedar Shoals High School
- Clarke Central High School
- Classic City High School
