= Farmington, Georgia =

- Unincorporated community
- Location within Georgia
- Coordinates: 33°46′34″N 83°25′25″W
- Country: United States
- State: Georgia
- County: Oconee
- Elevation: 761 ft (232 m)
- Time zone: UTC-5 (Eastern (EST))
  - Summer (DST): UTC-4 (EDT)
- ZIP code: 30638
- Area codes: 706 & 762
- GNIS feature ID: 331700

Farmington is an unincorporated community in Oconee County, Georgia, United States. The community is located along U.S. Routes 129/441, 3.1 miles (5.0 km) south-southeast of Bishop. Farmington has a post office with ZIP code 30638.

== History ==
The Georgia General Assembly incorporated the place in 1919 as the "Town of Farmington". The community was so named on account of its location within a farming district. The town's municipal charter was repealed in 1995.

== Notable people ==
- Bill Berry, drummer and founding member of R.E.M.
