= Quentin Moses =

American football player and coach (1983–2017)

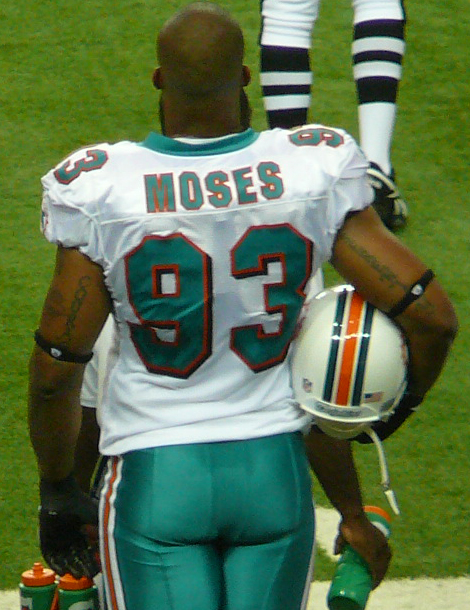
- Moses with the Miami Dolphins in 2009

No. 74, 93, 92
- Position: Defensive end / linebacker

Personal information
- Born: November 18, 1983; Athens, Georgia, U.S.
- Died: February 12, 2017 (aged 33); Monroe, Georgia, U.S.
- Listed height: 6 ft 5 in (1.96 m)
- Listed weight: 260 lb (118 kg)

Career information
- High school: Athens (GA) Cedar Shoals
- College: Georgia
- NFL draft: 2007: 3rd round, 65th overall pick

Career history

Playing
- Oakland Raiders (2007)*; Arizona Cardinals (2007); Miami Dolphins (2007–2010); Virginia Destroyers (2011)
- * Offseason or practice squad member only

Coaching
- Reinhardt (2011–2016) Defensive ends coach

Awards and highlights
- UFL champion (2011); Third-team All-American (2006); First-team All-SEC (2005)

Career NFL statistics
- Total tackles: 35
- Sacks: 3.5
- Fumble recoveries: 1
- Stats at Pro Football Reference

Quentin Omario Moses (November 18, 1983 – February 12, 2017) was an American professional football linebacker. He was selected by the Oakland Raiders in the third round of the 2007 NFL draft.

== Early life ==
Moses attended Cedar Shoals High School in Athens, Georgia. He was a prepStar All-Southeast Region, Atlanta Journal-Constitution Top 50 in Georgia, and named to Athens Banner-Herald All-Northeast Georgia team senior season as a defensive end. He was highly recruited as a basketball player before his decision to focus solely on football.

== College career ==
=== Awards and honors ===
- First-team Sporting News All-Freshman (2003)
- 2× SEC Academic Honor Roll (2004–2005)
- Mid-season Sports Illustrated All-American (2005)
- Consensus First-team All-SEC (2005)
- Rivals.com All-American (2005)
- Second-team Walter Camp Football Foundation All-American (2006)
- Third-team Associated Press All-American (2006)
- Playboy All-American (2006)

=== Statistics ===
Career statistics
		Tackles									
Year	GP	Total	Solo	Ast	TFL	Sck	FF	FR	INT	PD	TD
2003	14	33	19	14	5.0	2.5	0	0	0	0	0
2004	12	23	16	7	7.5	6.5	0	1	0	0	0
2005	13	44	35	9	20.5	11.5	1	2	0	2	0
2006	13	33	21	12	12.0	4.5	0	1	0	1	0
Total	52	133	91	42	45.0	25	1	4	0	3	0

Key: GP - games played; Total - total tackles; Solo - solo tackles; Ast - assisted tackles; TFL - tackles for loss; Sck - quarterback sacks; FF - forced fumbles; FR - fumble recoveries; INT - interceptions; PD - passes defensed; TD - touchdowns

== Professional career ==
Pre-draft measurables
Height	Weight	40-yard dash	10-yard split	20-yard split	20-yard shuttle	Three-cone drill	Vertical jump	Broad jump	Bench press
6 ft 5 1/4 in (1.96 m)	261 lb (118 kg)	4.85 s	1.68 s	2.79 s	4.53 s	7.38 s	32 in (0.81 m)	9 ft 7 in (2.92 m)	17 reps
All values from NFL Combine.

=== Oakland Raiders ===
Moses was drafted by the Oakland Raiders with the first pick in the third round of the 2007 NFL Draft. He was cut on September 1. Moses was the highest drafted player from that year's draft not to make a roster on opening day.

=== Arizona Cardinals ===
Moses was claimed off waivers by the Arizona Cardinals on September 2, 2007. He was released on October 16, 2007.

=== Miami Dolphins ===
Moses was signed by the Miami Dolphins on October 23, 2007. He recorded his first career full sack on November 26, bringing down Ben Roethlisberger during a Monday Night Football game against the Pittsburgh Steelers.

An exclusive-rights free agent in the 2009 offseason, Moses was re-signed on March 31, 2009, to a one-year, $460,000 contract with the Dolphins.

== Coaching career ==
After his playing career ended, he became the defensive ends coach for Reinhardt University.

== Death ==
On February 12, 2017, Moses died battling a house fire in Monroe, Georgia, where he tried to save his best friend Xavier Godard's wife Andria Godard and their daughter Jasmin Godard; Moses was taken to a hospital where he later died. He was 33.
