= Salem, Oconee County, Georgia =

Unincorporated community in Georgia, U.S.

Coordinates: 33°43′22″N 83°23′11″W

Salem is an unincorporated community in Oconee County, in the U.S. state of Georgia.

== History ==
The Georgia General Assembly incorporated Salem as a town in 1818. Salem no longer is incorporated. A later variant name was "Candy". A post office called Candy was in operation from 1898 until 1903.
