= Oconee County School District =

School district in Georgia (U.S. state)

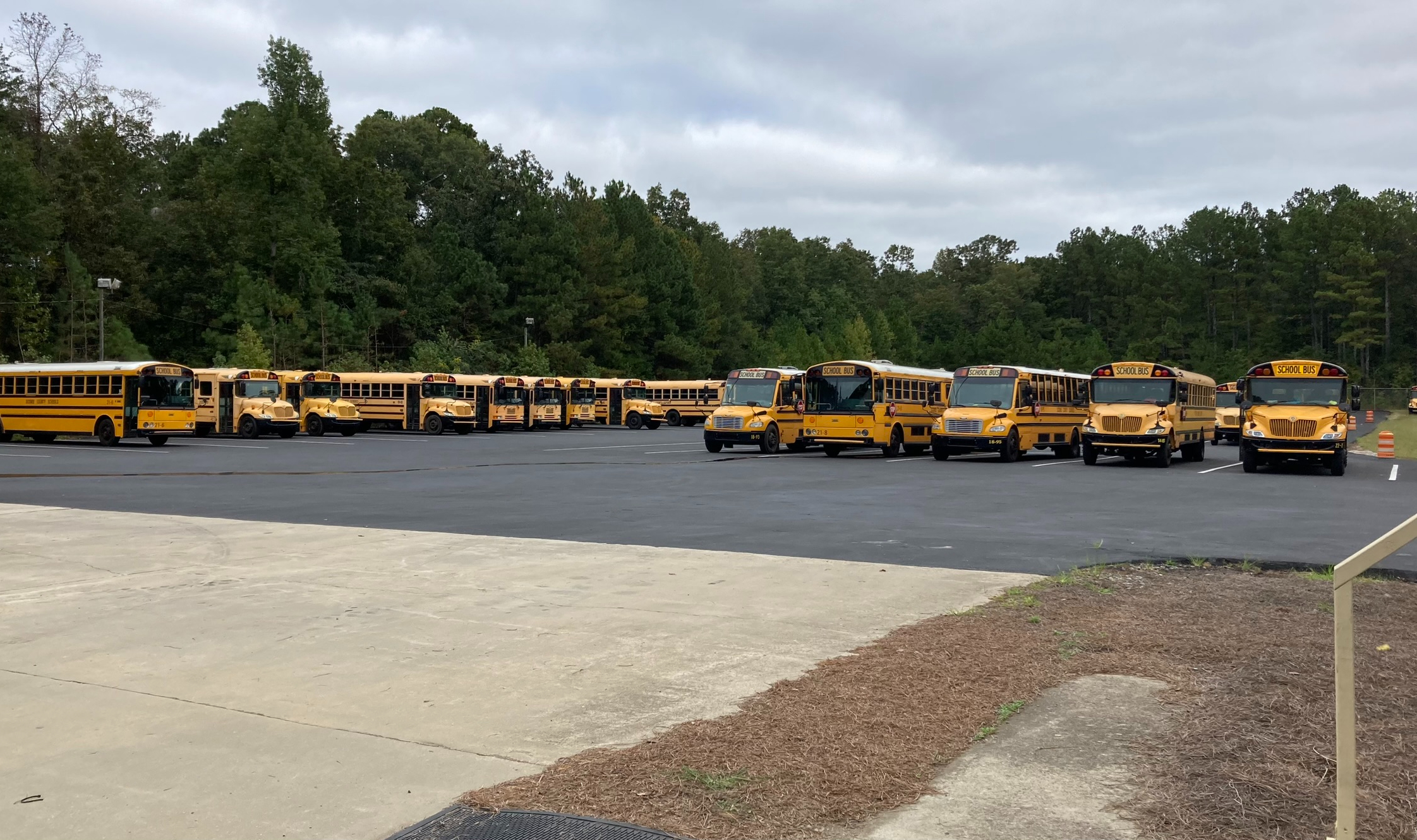

Address
- 71 North Main Street, PO Box 146 Watkinsville, Oconee, Georgia, 30677-6079; United States
- Coordinates: 33.8638°N 83.4076°W

District information
- Grades: Pre-K-12
- Superintendent: Jason L. Branch
- Accreditation(s): Accreditation

Students and staff
- Enrollment: 7271-OCS State Of The Schools 2016-2017
- Faculty: 361

Other information
- Website: www.oconeeschools.org

The Oconee County School District is a public school district in Oconee County, Georgia, United States, based in Watkinsville. It serves the communities of Bishop, Bogart, North High Shoals, and Watkinsville.

== Schools ==
The Oconee County School District has one primary school, six elementary schools, three middle schools, and two high schools. The total of schools is 12 schools. There are:

=== Primary school ===
- Oconee County Primary School (Kindergarten-2nd Grade)

=== Elementary schools ===
- Colham Ferry Elementary School (Kindergarten-5th Grade)
- Dove Creek Elementary School (Kindergarten-5th Grade)
- High Shoals Elementary School (Kindergarten-5th Grade)
- Malcom Bridge Elementary School (Kindergarten-5th Grade)
- Oconee County Elementary School (3rd Grade-5th Grade)
- Rocky Branch Elementary School (Kindergarten-5th Grade)

=== Middle schools ===
- Malcom Bridge Middle School (6th Grade-8th grade)
- Oconee County Middle School (6th Grade-8th grade)
- Dove Creek Middle School (6th Grade-8th grade)

=== High schools ===
- North Oconee High School (9th Grade-12th Grade)
- Oconee County High School (9th Grade-12th grade)

=== Image of OCS ===
Oconee County Schools
