= Oconee County High School =

Location
- 2721 Hog Mountain Road; Watkinsville, Georgia 30677; United States; 33°51′41″N 83°27′22″W

Information
- Type: Public
- School district: Oconee County School District
- Principal: Matt Stephens
- Teaching staff: 80.10 (on an FTE basis)
- Grades: 9–12
- Enrollment: 1,314 (2023–2024)
- Student to teacher ratio: 16.40
- Colors: Royal blue and white
- Nickname: Warriors
- Website: School website

Oconee County High School is a public secondary school in Watkinsville, Georgia, United States. It is a public high school that hosts grades 9–12. It is one of two high schools in the Oconee County School District. Its mascot is the Warrior, and its colors are blue and white.

The school was ranked number 499 out of 500 in Newsweek's 2014 rankings of the top 500 high schools in America, and is consistently named one of the top public high schools in Georgia with regard to Scholastic Aptitude Test (SAT) scores.

OCHS offers football, wrestling, soccer, swimming and diving, volleyball, baseball, tennis, track, and cross country. It also has a variety of fine arts programs, including a chorus, show choir, band, and drama program that produces musicals and one-act plays each year.

== Notable alumni ==
- Russ Callaway, college football coach and former player who is the current co-offensive coordinator and tight ends coach for the Florida Gators
- Adam Frazier, MLB outfielder
- Jake Johnson, college football tight end for the North Carolina Tar Heels
- Max Johnson, college football quarterback for the Georgia Southern Eagle
- Zach Mettenberger, NFL Quarterback
- Zeb Noland, college football coach and former player who is the current quarterbacks coach for Murray State Racers
- Tony Taylor, NFL Linebacker
- Jarryd Wallace, Paralympic bronze metalist
- West Weeks, NFL linebacker for the Indianapolis Colts
- Whit Weeks, college football linebacker for the LSU Tigers
