= Clarke Central High School =

Public high school in Athens, Georgia

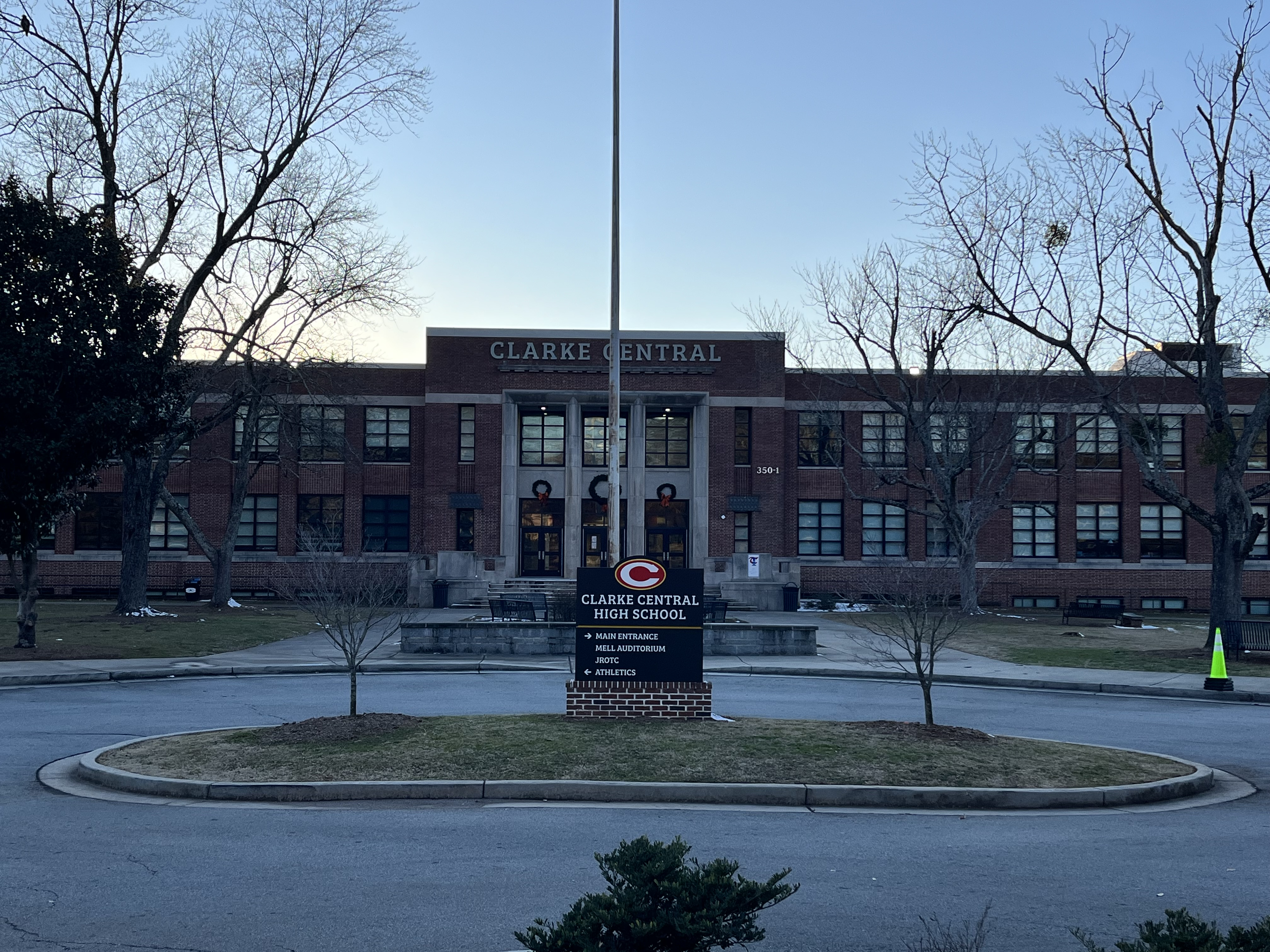

Location
- 350 S. Milledge Avenue; Athens, Georgia, 30605; United States; 33°57′04″N 83°23′24″W

Information
- Type: Public high school
- Established: 1971
- School district: Clarke County School District
- Principal: Swade Huff
- Teaching staff: 116.90 (FTE)
- Grades: 9–12
- Enrollment: 1,842 (2023–2024)
- Student to teacher ratio: 15.76
- Campus type: Day school
- Colors: Red and gold
- Athletics: 13 sports
- Athletics conference: Georgia High School Association, class AAAAA, Region 8
- Nickname: Gladiators
- Publication: Odyssey Newsmagazine
- Yearbook: Gladius
- Website: www.clarke.k12.ga.us/o/cch

Clarke Central High School (CCHS) is located in Athens, Georgia, United States. In 1970, Clarke County schools were desegregated, and the high school for black children, Burney-Harris High School (formerly Athens High and Industrial School), and the high school for white children, Athens High, merged to establish Clarke Central. Classes in the newly formed school began in the 1970–1971 school year.

CCHS is in the Clarke County School District and is one of two traditional high schools in the county; the other is Cedar Shoals High School. The two schools have a rivalry known as the Classic City Championship. The Clarke County School District is also home to a third, non-traditional high school, Classic City High.

Located in the heart of the city, CCHS's original building opened in 1952. Since then, the school has seen several renovations and additions. A modern three-story classroom and lab addition opened in 2006. Other improvements include a new gymnasium, theater, and food court.

== Academics ==
Clarke Central High School's success in improving students' SAT scores earned the school the regional Governor's Cup in 2006 and 2007. The governor's office presents the award each year to Georgia schools that achieve the greatest gains in average SAT scores.

In 2010, U.S. News & World Report awarded Clarke Central the Silver Medal and ranked the school in the top 3% of high schools nationwide and in the top 11 in the state of Georgia. Newsweek named CCHS one of America's Best Schools and placed it in the 96th percentile of high schools nationwide.

In 2012, Clarke Central was named an AP Science, Technology, Electronics, and Mathematics Honor School by the Georgia Department of Education. It was ranked in the top 11% of high schools nationwide by the Washington Post's High School Challenge.

== Athletics ==
Athletics teams at Clarke Central High School are known as the Gladiators.

Sports offered include cheerleading, cross country, football, fast-pitch softball, volleyball, basketball, swimming and diving, wrestling, baseball, golf, soccer, tennis, and track. Most of Clarke Central's sports are represented by men's and women's teams.

Coach Billy Henderson, one of the most successful coaches in Georgia High School history, coached the Gladiators from the 1970's through 1995. Henderson's final record with Clarke Central was 222-65-1 and he had an overall record of 285-107-15. Henderson received the Atlanta Falcons Lifetime Achievement Award. He made eighteen straight play-off appearances and ended his head coaching career with three state football championships, three baseball championships, and one swimming championship.

In 2010, the Gladiators captured the Region 8-AAAA Championship and finished the regular season 10-0.

=== State championship titles ===
Year	Sport	Notes
1971	Cross country (men)	
1971	Golf (men)	
1976	Cross country (men)	
1977	Football	
1979	Football	
1984	Tennis (men)	
1984	Track (men)	
1985	Football	
1987	Tennis (men)	tied with Riverwood
1988	Tennis	tied with Dunwoody
1999	Soccer (men)	
2011	Track (men)	

== Student life ==
=== Fine arts organizations ===
The school has award-winning band, orchestra, drama, and chorus programs.

=== Literary organizations ===
The school's yearbook, the Gladius, is an all-color annual, published by Lifetouch.

The school's literary-art magazine, the iliad, and the school's newsmagazine, the ODYSSEY, have won gold medals from the Columbia Scholastic Press Association, and top honors from the University of Georgia's Georgia Scholastic Press Association, the National Scholastic Press Association, the Southern Interscholastic Press Association, and the Quill and Scroll Honor Society.

== Demographics ==
- American Indian/Alaskan Native - 0%
- Asian - 2%
- Black or African American - 44%
- Hispanic - 24%
- Multi-Racial - 4%
- Native Hawaiian/Other Pacific Islander - 0%
- White/Caucasian - 26%

Student body population - 1,833

These statistics were current as of January 9, 2023.

== Notable alumni ==
- Kim Basinger - 1972, actress
- Paul Broun - 1963, Republican Congressman from Georgia from 2007-2015.
- Frank Bush - 1981, linebackers coach for the Atlanta Falcons, former linebacker for the Houston Oilers
- Eve Carson - 2004, slain Student Body President of the University of North Carolina-Chapel Hill
- Derek Dooley - 1986, offensive analyst for the Alabama Crimson Tide
- Jason Farris Brown - 1987, country music artist and former professional golfer
- Eva Cohn Galambos - 1944, first mayor of Sandy Springs, Georgia
- Willie Green - 1986, former wide receiver for the NFL Denver Broncos
- John Kasay - 1987, former NFL kicker
- Brian Kemp - 1982, Georgia State Senator (2002–2006), Secretary of State (2010–2018), Governor of Georgia (2019–present)
- Todd Kimsey - 1980, actor (Seinfeld, The Perfect Storm)
- Horace King - 1971, former running back for the NFL Detroit Lions
- Nene Leakes - 1985, born Linnethia Monique Johnson, reality show star, The Real Housewives of Atlanta
- Phaedra Parks - 1990, entertainment attorney, reality show star, The Real Housewives of Atlanta
- Khary Payton - 1990, actor (The Walking Dead, voiceover work)
- Chuck Smith - 1988, retired NFL defensive end and former defensive line coach at the University of Tennessee
- Keith Strickland - 1972, musician; B-52's drummer, bass player, and guitarist
- Fran Tarkenton - 1957, NFL Hall of Fame quarterback
- Dunta Robinson - 2000, former NFL cornerback
- Darius Weems - 2008, subject of the documentary Darius Goes West
- Ricky Wilson - 1971, musician, former B-52's guitarist (died 1985)
