= Oconee County, Georgia =

County in Georgia, United States

- County
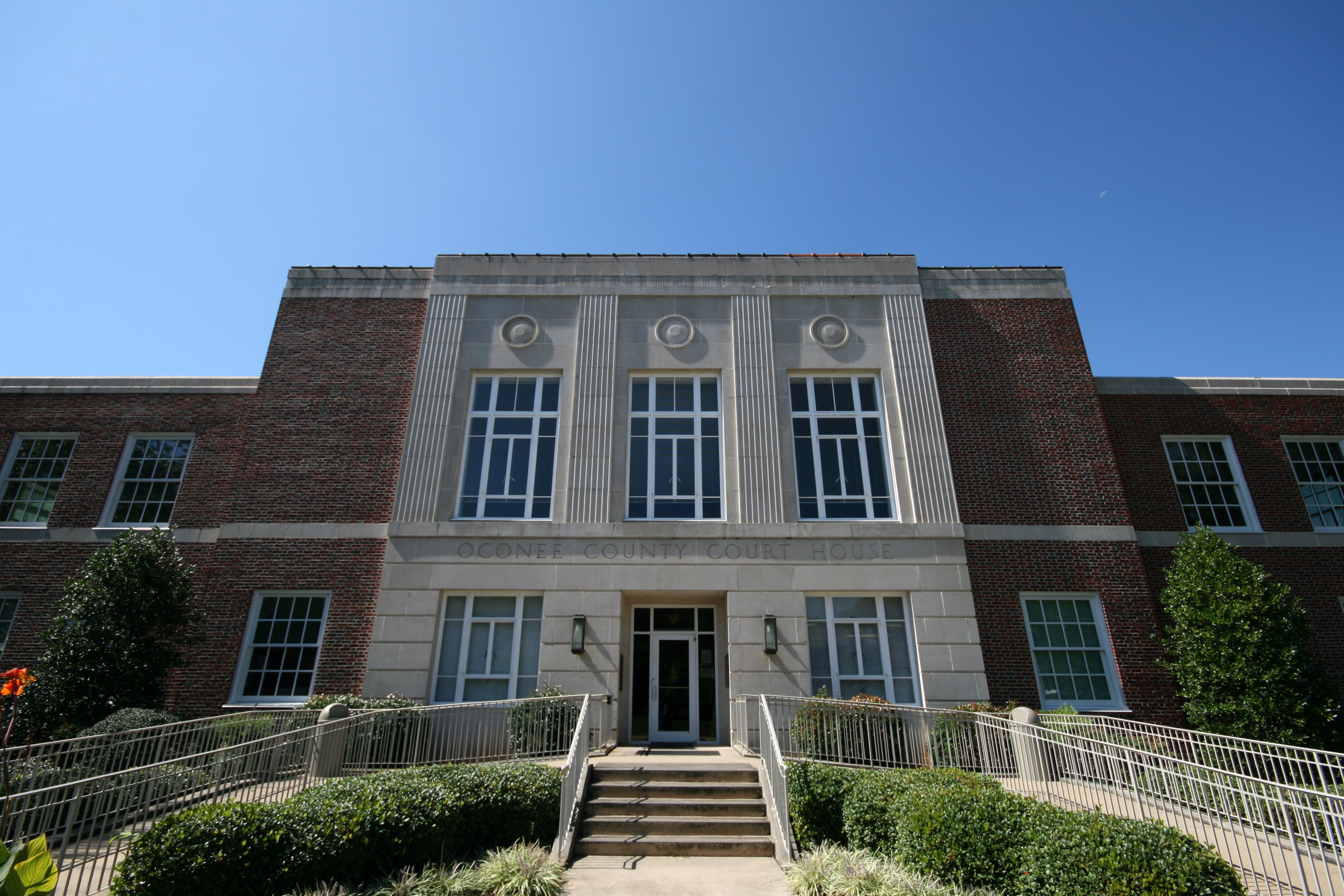
- Oconee County Courthouse in Watkinsville

- Seal

- Location within the U.S. state of Georgia
- Coordinates: 33°50′N 83°26′W
- Country: United States
- State: Georgia
- Founded: February 24, 1875; 151 years ago
- Named for: Oconee River
- Seat: Watkinsville
- Largest town: Watkinsville

Area
  - Total: 186 sq mi (480 km^{2})
  - Land: 184 sq mi (480 km^{2})
  - Water: 2.1 sq mi (5.4 km^{2}) 1.1%

Population (2020)
  - Total: 41,799
  - Estimate (2025): 44,893 ▲
  - Density: 227/sq mi (88/km^{2})
- Time zone: UTC−5 (Eastern)
  - Summer (DST): UTC−4 (EDT)
- Congressional district: 10th
- Website: www.oconeecountyga.gov

Oconee County is a county located in the East Central region of the U.S. state of Georgia. As of the 2020 census, the population was 41,799. The county seat is Watkinsville.

Oconee County is included in the Athens-Clarke County metropolitan area.

== History ==
The county's name derives from the Oconee, a Muskogean people of central Georgia. The name exists in several variations, including Ocone, Oconi, Ocony, and Ekwoni. Oconee County was created from the southwestern part of Clarke County in 1875 by the Georgia General Assembly. The new county was created to satisfy southwestern Clarke County residents' demand for their own county after the county seat was moved from Watkinsville to Athens by the General Assembly in 1872. It is named for the river flowing along part of its eastern border.

The county was ranked as the third-best rural county to live in by Progressive Farmer magazine in 2006.

== Geography ==
According to the U.S. Census Bureau, the county has a total area of 186 square miles (480 km^{2}), of which 184 square miles (480 km^{2}) is land and 2.1 square miles (5.4 km^{2}) (1.1%) is water. The county is located in the Piedmont region of the state.

The entirety of Oconee County is located in the Upper Oconee River sub-basin of the Altamaha River basin.

=== Adjacent counties ===
- Clarke County (north)
- Oglethorpe County (east)
- Greene County (southeast)
- Morgan County (south)
- Walton County (west)Southwest
- Barrow County (northwest)

=== National protected area ===
- Oconee National Forest (part)

== Communities ==
=== Towns ===
- Bishop
- Bogart
- North High Shoals
- Watkinsville

=== Unincorporated community ===
- Elder
- Farmington
- Salem

== Demographics ==
Historical population
Census	Pop.	Note	%±
1880	6,351		—
1890	7,713		21.4%
1900	8,602		11.5%
1910	11,104		29.1%
1920	11,067		−0.3%
1930	8,082		−27.0%
1940	7,576		−6.3%
1950	7,009		−7.5%
1960	6,304		−10.1%
1970	7,915		25.6%
1980	12,427		57.0%
1990	17,618		41.8%
2000	26,225		48.9%
2010	32,666		24.6%
2020	41,799		28.0%
2025 (est.)	44,893	▲	7.4%
U.S. Decennial Census; 1790-1880 1890-1910; 1920-1930 1930-1940; 1940-1950 1960-1980; 1980-2000 2010

=== Racial and ethnic composition ===
Oconee County, Georgia – Racial and ethnic composition Note: the US Census treats Hispanic/Latino as an ethnic category. This table excludes Latinos from the racial categories and assigns them to a separate category. Hispanics/Latinos may be of any race.
Race / Ethnicity (NH = Non-Hispanic)	Pop 1980	Pop 1990	Pop 2000	Pop 2010	Pop 2020	% 1980	% 1990	% 2000	% 2010	% 2020
White alone (NH)	11,056	16,015	23,112	28,306	33,886	88.97%	90.90%	88.13%	86.28%	81.07%
Black or African American alone (NH)	1,255	1,309	1,653	1,610	1,897	10.10%	7.43%	6.30%	4.91%	4.54%
Native American or Alaska Native alone (NH)	8	33	40	31	31	0.06%	0.19%	0.15%	0.09%	0.07%
Asian alone (NH)	13	80	373	1,016	2,066	0.10%	0.45%	1.42%	3.10%	4.94%
Native Hawaiian or Pacific Islander alone (NH)	x	x	11	4	0	x	x	0.04%	0.01%	0.00%
Other race alone (NH)	5	3	14	35	171	0.04%	0.02%	0.05%	0.11%	0.41%
Mixed race or Multiracial (NH)	x	x	189	370	1,401	x	x	0.72%	1.13%	3.35%
Hispanic or Latino (any race)	90	178	833	1,436	2,347	0.72%	1.01%	3.18%	4.38%	5.61%
Total	12,427	17,618	26,225	32,808	41,799	100.00%	100.00%	100.00%	100.00%	100.00%

=== 2020 census ===
As of the 2020 census, the county had a population of 41,799, and the census counted 10,727 families residing in the county.

The median age was 39.7 years, 27.7% of residents were under the age of 18, and 15.5% of residents were 65 years of age or older. For every 100 females there were 95.9 males, and for every 100 females age 18 and over there were 92.8 males age 18 and over. 45.9% of residents lived in urban areas, while 54.1% lived in rural areas.

The racial makeup of the county was 82.4% White, 4.6% Black or African American, 0.2% American Indian and Alaska Native, 5.0% Asian, 0.0% Native Hawaiian and Pacific Islander, 2.1% from some other race, and 5.7% from two or more races. Hispanic or Latino residents of any race comprised 5.6% of the population.

There were 14,360 households in the county, of which 43.2% had children under the age of 18 living with them and 19.1% had a female householder with no spouse or partner present. About 16.1% of all households were made up of individuals and 8.6% had someone living alone who was 65 years of age or older.

There were 14,998 housing units, of which 4.3% were vacant. Among occupied housing units, 82.0% were owner-occupied and 18.0% were renter-occupied. The homeowner vacancy rate was 1.1% and the rental vacancy rate was 4.3%.

== Government ==
Oconee County is governed by a four-member board of commissioners, which holds legislative power. The board is led by a separately-elected chairman, who holds executive power. The board is vested with budget and taxing authority, ordinance-making authority, and control of county property, roads and facilities. The chairman and all members of the board are elected from at-large districts (called "posts") to staggered terms of four years.

The chairman of the board is the county's chief executive officer who, in consultation with the commissioners, appoints officers and staff as needed to administer the responsibilities of the board.

The current members of the Board are:

- Chairman: John Daniell
- Post 1: Mark Thomas
- Post 2: Chuck Horton
- Post 3: Amrey Harden
- Post 4: Mark Saxon

The judicial branch of government is administered through the Georgia court system as a part of the 10th Judicial District, Western Circuit.

Primary law enforcement services in the portion of the county outside the City of Watkinsville are provided by the sheriff's office. (Law enforcement within the Watkinsville City Limits is the jurisdiction of the Watkinsville Police Department.) The office of Sheriff is an elected position; since 2020, the office has been held by James Hale.

=== Politics ===
As of the 2020s, Oconee County is a strongly Republican voting county, voting 68% for Donald Trump in 2024. For elections to the United States House of Representatives, Oconee County is part of Georgia's 10th congressional district, currently represented by Mike Collins. For elections to the Georgia State Senate, Oconee County is part of District 46. For elections to the Georgia House of Representatives, Oconee County is part of districts 120 and 121.

United States presidential election results for Oconee County, Georgia
Year	Republican		Democratic		Third party(ies)	
Year	No.	%	No.	%	No.	%
1912	1	0.26%	208	53.47%	180	46.27%
1916	0	0.00%	497	74.96%	166	25.04%
1920	108	24.05%	341	75.95%	0	0.00%
1924	46	11.89%	279	72.09%	62	16.02%
1928	300	46.58%	344	53.42%	0	0.00%
1932	39	5.43%	664	92.48%	15	2.09%
1936	173	26.25%	483	73.29%	3	0.46%
1940	177	21.66%	635	77.72%	5	0.61%
1944	195	25.49%	570	74.51%	0	0.00%
1948	94	10.05%	579	61.93%	262	28.02%
1952	337	22.19%	1,182	77.81%	0	0.00%
1956	314	21.36%	1,156	78.64%	0	0.00%
1960	297	19.60%	1,218	80.40%	0	0.00%
1964	1,241	53.63%	1,073	46.37%	0	0.00%
1968	713	28.16%	414	16.35%	1,405	55.49%
1972	2,029	81.39%	464	18.61%	0	0.00%
1976	1,184	34.70%	2,228	65.30%	0	0.00%
1980	2,065	47.29%	2,141	49.03%	161	3.69%
1984	3,471	70.29%	1,467	29.71%	0	0.00%
1988	4,265	67.89%	1,990	31.68%	27	0.43%
1992	4,125	51.08%	2,745	33.99%	1,206	14.93%
1996	5,116	58.05%	2,992	33.95%	705	8.00%
2000	7,611	68.15%	3,184	28.51%	373	3.34%
2004	10,276	72.37%	3,789	26.68%	134	0.94%
2008	12,120	70.57%	4,825	28.09%	229	1.33%
2012	13,098	73.34%	4,421	24.76%	340	1.90%
2016	13,425	65.96%	5,581	27.42%	1,347	6.62%
2020	16,595	65.87%	8,162	32.40%	436	1.73%
2024	18,424	67.52%	8,620	31.59%	243	0.89%

United States Senate election results for Oconee County, Georgia2
Year	Republican		Democratic		Third party(ies)	
Year	No.	%	No.	%	No.	%
2020	17,108	68.05%	7,465	29.69%	569	2.26%
2020	16,220	68.90%	7,322	31.10%	0	0.00%

United States Senate election results for Oconee County, Georgia3
Year	Republican		Democratic		Third party(ies)	
Year	No.	%	No.	%	No.	%
2020	9,914	39.80%	5,448	21.87%	9,547	38.33%
2020	16,041	68.15%	7,496	31.85%	0	0.00%
2022	14,681	65.88%	6,987	31.36%	615	2.76%
2022	13,543	67.23%	6,600	32.77%	0	0.00%

Georgia Gubernatorial election results for Oconee County
Year	Republican		Democratic		Third party(ies)	
Year	No.	%	No.	%	No.	%
2022	16,553	73.64%	5,783	25.73%	142	0.63%

== Education ==
=== Oconee County School District ===
The Oconee County School District provides education for grades pre-school to twelve and consists of six elementary schools, three middle schools, and two high schools. The district has 361 full-time teachers and over 5,615 students.

=== Private schools ===
There are currently three private schools located in the county. They are:

- Westminster Christian Academy
- Prince Avenue Christian School
- Athens Academy

=== Colleges and universities ===
The University of North Georgia maintains a satellite campus near Watkinsville. It was a Gainesville State College campus until the 2012 merger of Gainesville State College with North Georgia College and State University.

The College of Athens (CoA) is a private Christian college that was established in 2012 near Watkinsville. CoA currently offers certificates, undergraduate, and graduate degrees in nine various major areas.

== Media ==
There is one weekly-published newspaper in Oconee County: The Oconee Enterprise.

Cox Media Group also operates a radio broadcast facility on Tower Place in northeast Oconee County. Four radio stations are operated from this facility:

- WNGC 106.1 FM
- WGMG 102.1 FM (Magic 102.1)
- WPUP 100.1 FM (Power 100.1)
- WRFC 960 AM (The Ref)

== Transportation ==
=== Major highways ===
- U.S. Route 29 / State Route 8
- U.S. Route 78
  - U.S. Route 78 Business
- U.S. Route 129 / U.S. Route 441 / State Route 24
  - U.S. Route 129 Business / U.S. Route 441 Business / State Route 24 Business
- State Route 10
  - State Route 10 Loop / State Route 422 (unsigned)
- State Route 15
- State Route 53
- State Route 186
- State Route 316

=== Pedestrians and cycling ===
The city has limited walkability options available. However, since 2017 plans are being discussed to develop a multi-use trail network.

== Notable people ==
- Nathan Crawford Barnett, member of the Georgia House of Representatives and Georgia Secretary of State for more than 30 years.
- Phil Campbell, farmer
- Adam Frazier, Baltimore Orioles second baseman
- Gavin Adcock, country music singer
- John Wes Townley, former NASCAR Driver
- Joe Scelfo, college football coach

== See also ==
- National Register of Historic Places listings in Oconee County, Georgia
- List of counties in Georgia
