= Cedar Shoals High School =

Public high school in Athens, Georgia

Location
- 1300 Cedar Shoals Drive; Athens, (Clarke County), Georgia 30605; United States
- Coordinates: 33°55′17″N 83°19′35″W

Information
- School type: Public, high school
- Established: 1972
- School district: Clarke County School District
- NCES District ID: 1301170
- CEEB code: 110116
- NCES School ID: 130117000453
- Principal: Antonio Derricotte
- Teaching staff: 106.80 (FTE)
- Grades: 9–12
- Enrollment: 1,537 (2023-2024)
- Student to teacher ratio: 14.39
- Colors: Blue and orange
- Mascot: Jaguar
- Feeder schools: Hilsman Middle School, W. R. Coile Middle School
- Website: clarke.k12.ga.us/cedarshoals

Cedar Shoals High School is an American high school established in 1972 in Athens, Georgia, in the Clarke County School District. It and Clarke Central High School are the district's two main high schools, and their rivalry is known as the Classic City Championship.

The school inaugurated a new building in 2001.

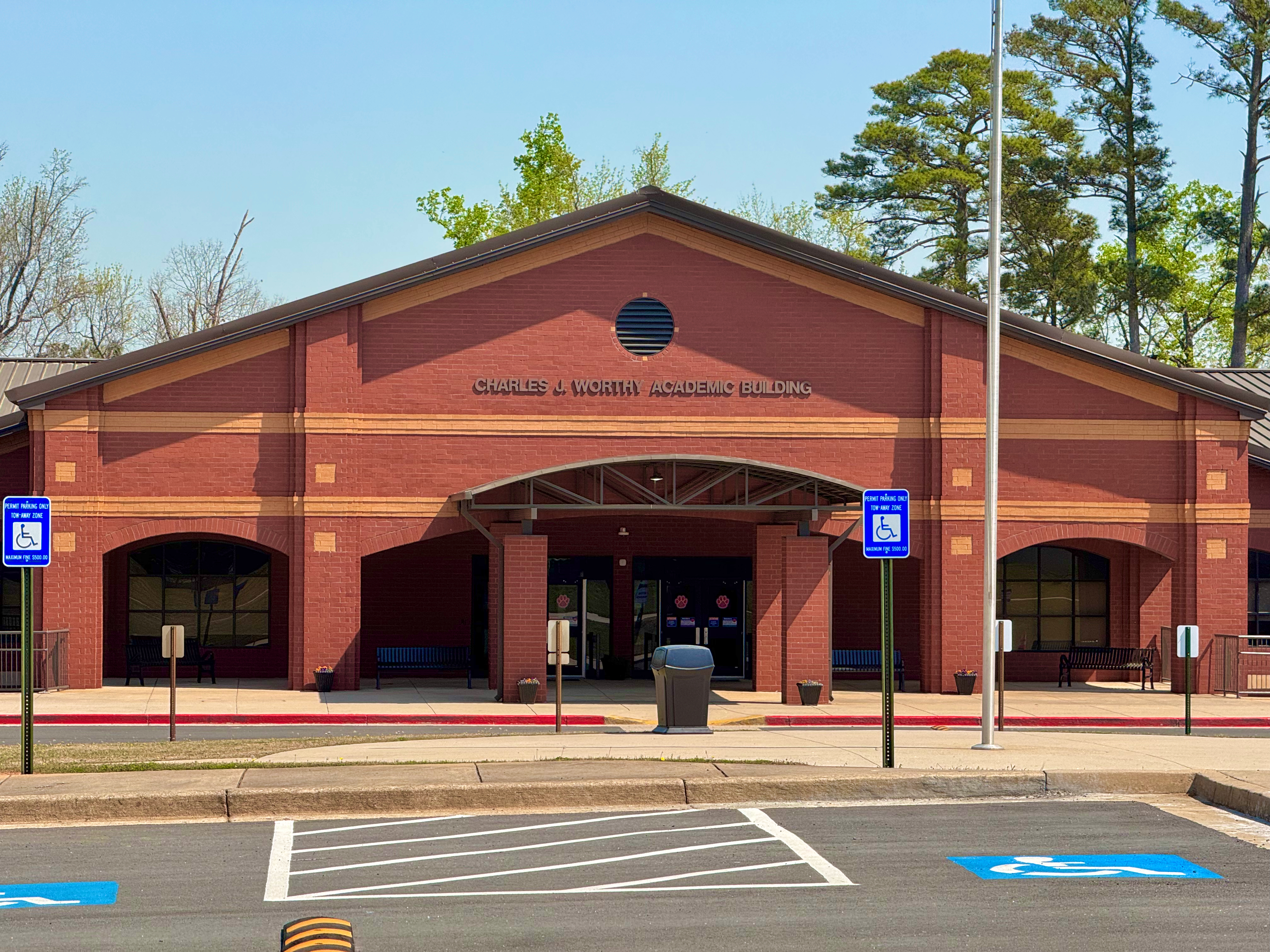
Cedar Shoals High School

== Student activities ==
Cedar Shoals features a variety of student activities.

=== Competitions ===
- The JROTC Raider team of male and female JROTC cadets compete at many state, regional and national Raider events. For the 70th anniversary of D-Day, they were the only group from Georgia to be invited to march in the D-Day Memorial parade in Ste. Mère-Eglise on June 6, 2014. Their trip was impeded by a delayed flight to New York, forcing them to spend the night at John F. Kennedy Airport. The cadets marched in the parade and toured the Normandy area and Paris before returning home on June 11, 2014.
- The Classic City Sound Marching Band, under the direction of Dr. Zandra Bell-McRoy, has earned several Superior honors at area marching band festivals. Known for their halftime shows highlighting pop, funk, and even Latin fare, the band has performed at the Allstate Sugar Bowl, the National Fourth of July Parade in Washington, D.C., and the Chicago Thanksgiving Day Parade.
- The school's academic team (known as the QuizJags) has won several city, region and state titles since 2004. On April 30, 2014, they defeated Galloway School to become WSB-TV's High Q champion and won $5000 in scholarship money for the players. The team has also attended four National History Bowls in Washington, D.C., as well as seven NAQT High School National Championship Tournaments since 2004. The JV team won their second Georgia Academic Team Association JV State title in 2015.

=== Community ===
- The Interact Club is a student division of Rotary International that raises funds for charity.

== Notable alumni ==
- Tituss Burgess, Emmy-nominated actor known for playing Titus in the hit comedy series Unbreakable Kimmy Schmidt
- Steve C. Jones, Judge, U.S. District Court
- DeDe Lattimore, defensive lineman for University of South Florida and the Chicago Bears
- Quentin Moses, defensive lineman for the Georgia Bulldogs and the NFL
- James Ponsoldt, film director, actor and screenwriter
