= Bogart, Georgia =

- Town
- Location in Oconee County and the state of Georgia
- Coordinates: 33°56′52″N 83°32′03″W
- Country: United States
- State: Georgia
- Counties: Oconee, Clarke

Area
  - Total: 2.52 sq mi (6.53 km^{2})
  - Land: 2.51 sq mi (6.49 km^{2})
  - Water: 0.015 sq mi (0.04 km^{2})
- Elevation: 820 ft (250 m)

Population (2020)
  - Total: 1,326
  - Density: 529.4/sq mi (204.42/km^{2})
- Time zone: UTC-5 (Eastern (EST))
  - Summer (DST): UTC-4 (EDT)
- ZIP code: 30622
- Area code: 470/678/770
- FIPS code: 13-09068
- GNIS feature ID: 2405294
- Website: cityofbogart.com

Bogart is a city in Clarke and Oconee counties in the U.S. state of Georgia. As of the 2020 census, the city had a population of 1,326.

== History ==
The town was originally named for the influential Creek-Seminole leader Osceola. In 1892, the city was renamed Bogart in honor of a locally respected railroad agent after learning that another Georgia community, in Terrell County, was also called Osceola. Bogart was once part of Franklin County, then Jackson County, and now sits in Oconee County with a small portion located in Clarke County. Many of the settlers who came to Bogart, came in during the Land Lottery of 1820. When the train from Athens to Atlanta was built in the 1890s, life flourished in Bogart. The city of Bogart was incorporated in 1905. The thriving city had a bank, a mercantile store, a boarding house, a drug store, a railroad depot, three cotton gins, a post office, blacksmith shops, a school, several churches, and gristmills.

== Geography ==
According to the United States Census Bureau, the town has a total area of 2.4 square miles (6.2 km^{2}), of which 2.4 square miles (6.2 km^{2}) is land and 0.42% is water.

== Demographics ==
Historical population
Census	Pop.	Note	%±
1910	257		—
1920	430		67.3%
1930	346		−19.5%
1940	379		9.5%
1950	459		21.1%
1960	403		−12.2%
1970	667		65.5%
1980	819		22.8%
1990	1,018		24.3%
2000	1,049		3.0%
2010	1,034		−1.4%
2020	1,326		28.2%
U.S. Decennial Census

=== 2020 census ===
As of the 2020 census, Bogart had a population of 1,326. The median age was 36.7 years. 26.7% of residents were under the age of 18 and 12.7% of residents were 65 years of age or older. For every 100 females there were 97.0 males, and for every 100 females age 18 and over there were 91.0 males age 18 and over.

71.0% of residents lived in urban areas, while 29.0% lived in rural areas.

There were 489 households in Bogart, of which 38.7% had children under the age of 18 living in them. Of all households, 51.1% were married-couple households, 14.1% were households with a male householder and no spouse or partner present, and 29.4% were households with a female householder and no spouse or partner present. About 24.0% of all households were made up of individuals and 9.0% had someone living alone who was 65 years of age or older.

There were 536 housing units, of which 8.8% were vacant. The homeowner vacancy rate was 2.9% and the rental vacancy rate was 3.0%.

Bogart racial composition as of 2020
Race	Num.	Perc.
White (non-Hispanic)	976	73.6%
Black or African American (non-Hispanic)	109	8.22%
Native American	2	0.15%
Asian	45	3.39%
Other/Mixed	60	4.52%
Hispanic or Latino	134	10.11%

=== Demographic estimates ===
As of 2024, of the 1,034 people in Bogart, 894 of them lived in Oconee County and 140 of them lived in Clarke County.

== Education ==
All of Oconee County is in the Oconee County School District. Zoned schools include Dove Creek Elementary School, Dove Creek Middle School, and North Oconee High School.

Dove Creek Elementary opened in 2018. Previously the zoned elementary school for Oconee County was Malcolm Bridge Elementary School. Dove Creek Middle was scheduled to open in 2023. Previously the zoned middle school was Malcolm Bridge Middle School.

All of Clarke County is in the Clarke County School District. Zoned schools include Cleveland Road Elementary School, Burney-Harris-Lyons Middle School, and Clarke Central High School.
