= Watkinsville, Georgia =

- City
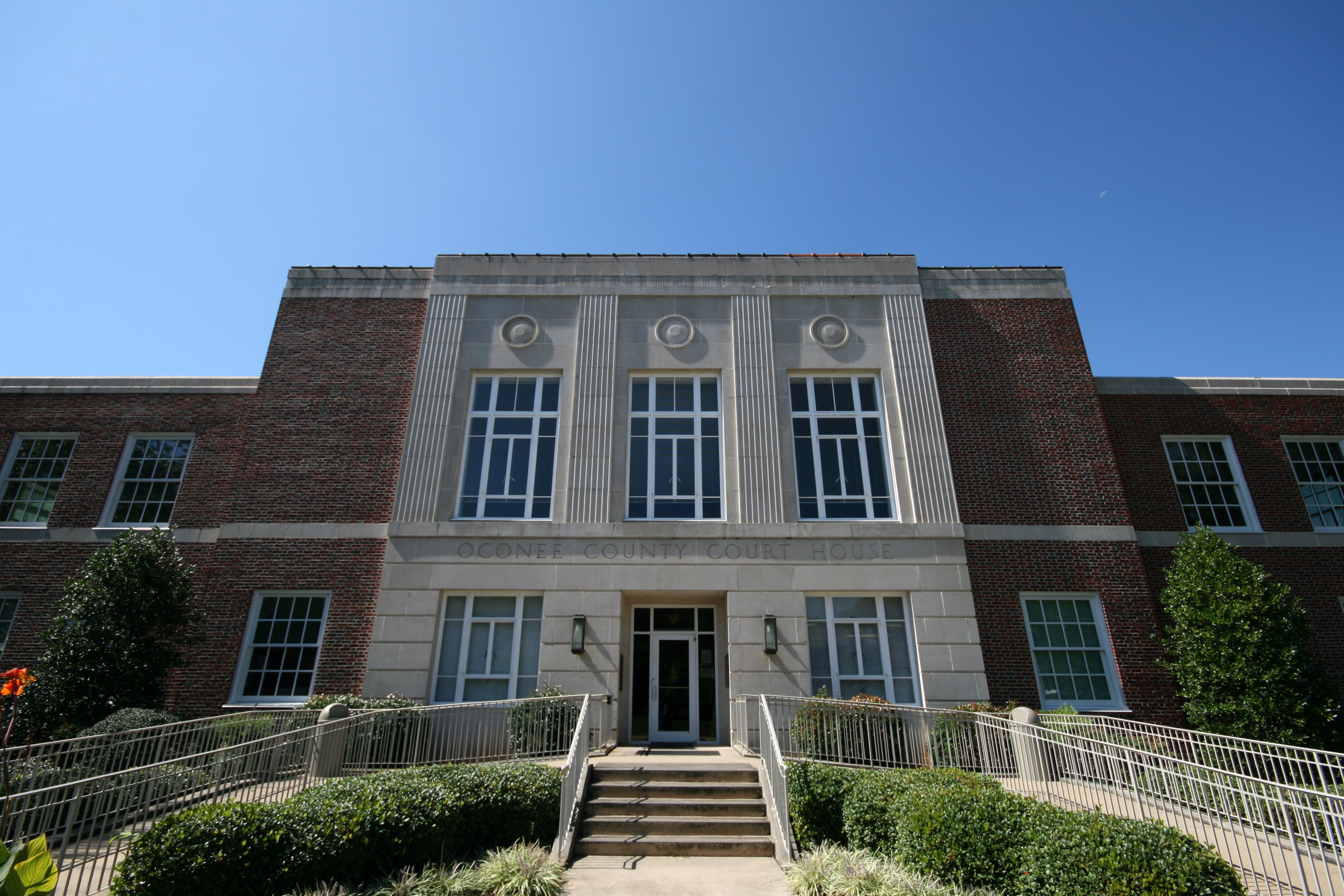
- Oconee County Courthouse in Watkinsville, Georgia

- Logo

- Location in Oconee County and the state of Georgia
- Coordinates: 33°51′46″N 83°24′29″W
- Country: United States
- State: Georgia
- County: Oconee

Area
  - Total: 3.31 sq mi (8.58 km^{2})
  - Land: 3.27 sq mi (8.48 km^{2})
  - Water: 0.039 sq mi (0.10 km^{2})
- Elevation: 735 ft (224 m)

Population (2020)
  - Total: 2,896
  - Density: 884.1/sq mi (341.36/km^{2})
- Time zone: UTC−5 (Eastern (EST))
  - Summer (DST): UTC−4 (EDT)
- ZIP Code: 30677
- Area code: 706
- FIPS code: 13-80788
- GNIS feature ID: 2405687
- Website: cityofwatkinsville.com

Watkinsville is the largest city and county seat of Oconee County, Georgia, United States. As of the 2020 census, the city had a total population of 2,896. It served as the seat of Clarke County until 1872 when the county seat of that county was moved to Athens, a move which ultimately led to the creation of Oconee County in 1875. It is included in the Athens-Clarke County, Georgia Metropolitan Statistical Area.

== History ==
Named after colonel Robert Watkins, Watkinsville was first named in records in 1791. It was located on the dangerous western frontier of the new United States. The Methodist Church played a prominent role in the city's early history. The Georgia General Assembly incorporated Watkinsville in 1815.

Watkinsville had previously been in Clarke County. Oconee County was created from the southwestern part of Clarke County in 1875 by the Georgia General Assembly.

=== 1905 lynching ===
On June 30, 1905, Watkinsville saw one of the worst outbreaks of racial violence ever in Georgia. In one instance, eight men (seven of whom were black) were pulled from a local jail and lynched. The lynching occurred due to two events. One of which was accusations that Sandy Price, one of the black males, assaulted a white woman named Weldon Dooley at her home in Watkinsville. Secondly, unsupported rumors spread that black males had killed a white couple known as the Holbrooks. This provoked the town people further. Price tried to flee from a crowd of angry locals, who chased and fired at him. He escaped the crowd of people, but was captured by the law and placed in jail. News of Price's jailing reached the people and they began planning his killing. People from the surrounding areas gathered together and forcefully retrieved the key to the jail cells from L. H. Alken, the marshal of the local jail. According to two eyewitnesses, the mob tied the African Americans and one white man to posts outside the jail after retrieving them, then shot them multiple times with pistols, rifles, and shotguns. The only survivor of the killings was Joe Patterson, who was shot in the head and torso, but found still breathing by the crowd. One black male inside the jail, Ed Thrasher, was spared from the lynching. Another incident occurred on 1917 that could have been racially motivated.

== Geography ==
Watkinsville is located at 33°51′46″N 83°24′29″W (33.862818, −83.408094).

According to the United States Census Bureau, the city has a total area of 3.2 square miles (8.3 km^{2}), of which 3.2 square miles (8.3 km^{2}) is land and 0.31% is water. Watkinsville is located near the University of Georgia.

== Demographics ==
Historical population
Census	Pop.	Note	%±
1810	224		—
1870	643		—
1880	350		−45.6%
1890	314		−10.3%
1900	351		11.8%
1910	483		37.6%
1920	465		−3.7%
1930	425		−8.6%
1940	558		31.3%
1950	662		18.6%
1960	758		14.5%
1970	986		30.1%
1980	1,240		25.8%
1990	1,600		29.0%
2000	2,097		31.1%
2010	2,832		35.1%
2020	2,896		2.3%
2025 (est.)	4,131	▲	42.6%
U.S. Decennial Census; 2025

=== 2020 census ===
As of the 2020 census, Watkinsville had a population of 2,896. The median age was 38.3 years. 26.9% of residents were under the age of 18 and 16.0% of residents were 65 years of age or older. For every 100 females there were 89.3 males, and for every 100 females age 18 and over there were 86.3 males age 18 and over.

97.7% of residents lived in urban areas, while 2.3% lived in rural areas.

There were 1,092 households in Watkinsville, including 741 family households, of which 40.1% had children under the age of 18 living in them. Of all households, 51.6% were married-couple households, 14.4% were households with a male householder and no spouse or partner present, and 29.1% were households with a female householder and no spouse or partner present. About 23.4% of all households were made up of individuals and 12.4% had someone living alone who was 65 years of age or older.

There were 1,164 housing units, of which 6.2% were vacant. The homeowner vacancy rate was 1.9% and the rental vacancy rate was 6.5%.

Watkinsville racial composition as of 2020
Race	Num.	Perc.
White (non-Hispanic)	2,344	80.94%
Black or African American (non-Hispanic)	158	5.46%
Native American	5	0.17%
Asian	82	2.83%
Other/Mixed	146	5.04%
Hispanic or Latino	161	5.56%

== Government ==
Watkinsville is governed by a five-person elected city council, which is led by a separately elected mayor. The current mayor is Brian Brodrick, and the current city council members are Chuck Garrett, Connie Massey, Brett Thomas, Christine Tucker, and Jeff Campbell. The city clerk is Julie Klein. The City Manager is Sharyn Dickerson, formerly an Athens-Clarke Commissioner.

== Education ==
The Oconee County School District provides primary and secondary public education services for all residents of Watkinsville. The only public school within the Watkinsville city limits is Colham Ferry Elementary School. Watkinsville has one of the best education systems in Georgia as ranked by the Georgia Department of Education. There are also several private schools such as Westminster Christian Academy, Athens Academy, and Prince Avenue Christian School nearby.

== Arts and culture ==
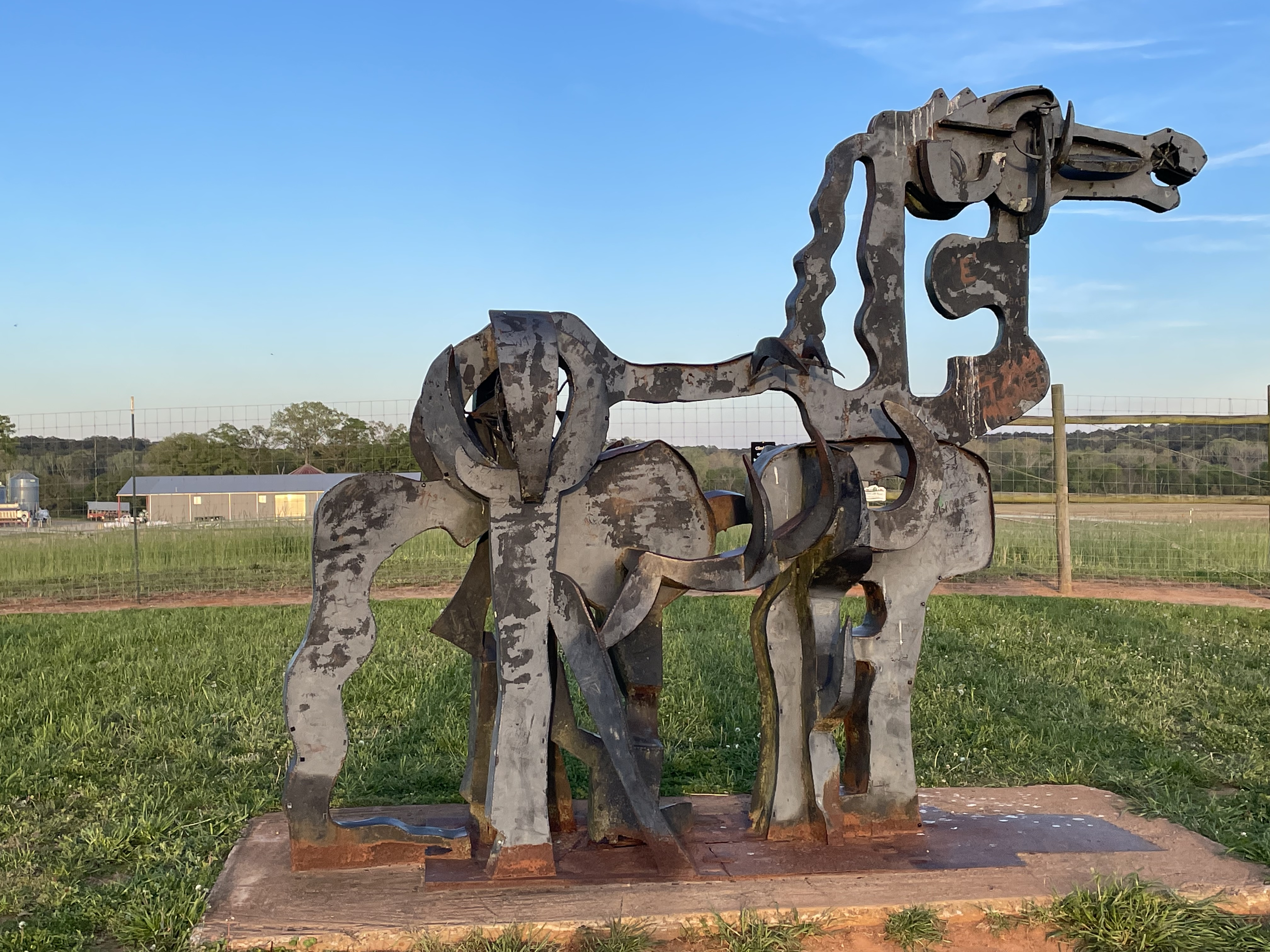
Iron Horse in Watkinsville, Georgia

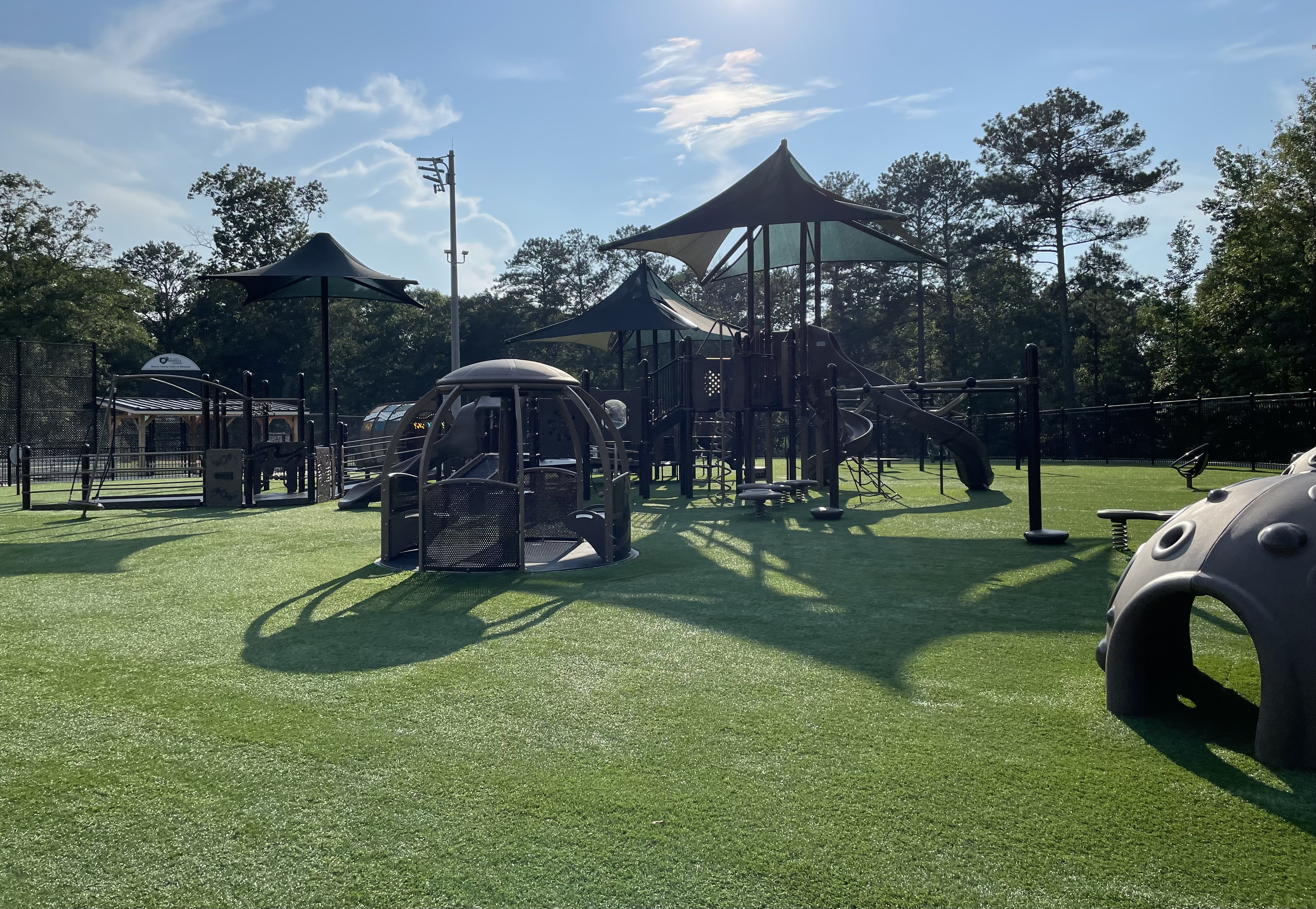
The Playground of Possibilities in Watkinsville, Georgia

Watkinsville adopted a tagline in 2021 of "Come. Connect. Create." highlighting its desire to become a destination, its goal of better connecting its citizens and its embrace of creators of the arts and entrepreneurs. Its unofficial motto "The Artland of Georgia" is on the wall at City Hall, and was designed by the late artist Jim Shearon. The Oconee Cultural Arts Foundation or OCAF is located in Watkinsville in the old high school as part of the 1902 OCAF Center and Gallery near the Board of Education. OCAF also has recently restored "Rocket Hall," a WPA project in the 1930s. Rocket Hall, long used for school and youth basketball, is now used for exhibitions and community gatherings. Just outside Rocket Hall is the recently restored Rocket Field, an historic ball field and play area for community youth that also includes a new play structure and stage for concerts and performances. The city recently finished a $1 million renovation of the park with support from Value Added Concepts. The Iron Horse sculpture stands in a field approximately twelve miles south of Watkinsville (barely in Greene County).

The city has a thriving Main Street and recently established a downtown development authority to help guide future growth and planning for downtown. It is also home to Wire Park, a hub for business, entertainment, and dining created from a former wire factory on the eastern side of town. The city also has a full industrial park and a thriving base of small businesses on its southern side, including LAD Truck Lines, IMI, Taylor's Iron, Tifosi Optics and Core Blend Fitness.

== Transportation ==
=== Major roads ===
- State Route 15
- State Route 24
- State Route 53
- U.S. Route 129
- U.S. Route 441

=== Pedestrians and cycling ===
The city has an increasing number of walkability options available. The city adopted a new transportation plan to guide future bike and pedestrian investments. A sidewalk on VFW Drive (and a few surrounding streets) and a new sidewalk and pedestrian bridge along Harden Hill Road have enabled more citizens to safely walk downtown, and the city is currently working on plans for a sidewalk on Simonton Bridge Road and to connect to the new Thomas Farm Preserve, a 100-acre greenspace that will have more than five miles of trails for walking, running, and mountain biking.

== Notable people ==
- Nathan Crawford Barnett, member of the Georgia House of Representatives and Georgia Secretary of State
- Brady Boswell, racing driver
- Alan Busenitz, baseball player
- Ed Crowley, baseball player
- Atticus Haygood, Methodist Bishop and Emory College president
- Hank Huckaby, chancellor of University System of Georgia
- Zach Mettenberger, former NFL quarterback for Tennessee Titans
- Jeannette Rankin, first woman to serve in Congress
- Tony Taylor, pro football player
- Buck Thrasher, baseball player
- John Wes Townley, retired NASCAR driver, notable for driving Zaxby's car
- Marcus Wiedower, politician. Member of Georgia House of Representatives.
- Gavin Adcock – country music artist
