= Chicopee-Dudley =

Coordinates: 33°57′30″N 83°22′00″W

Chicopee-Dudley is a primarily residential neighborhood in Athens, Georgia, located east of the city's Downtown. The neighborhood, as officially defined, straddles the North Oconee River between Third Street and Oconee Street; however, the majority of the neighborhood's territory, landmarks, and population exist to the east of the river.

The neighborhood's name acknowledges the names of two of the most important landmarks in the area: the Chicopee building, a former mill now housing offices of the University of Georgia, and Dudley Park, serving as a trailhead for the North Oconee River Greenway and, eventually, Athens' Rails-to-Trails project.

In addition to recreational space and property owned by the university, Chicopee-Dudley has a mix of privately owned houses, multi-family apartment buildings, public housing, churches, and limited commercial development that is concentrated along Oconee/Oak Street and East Broad Street. Recently, the neighborhood has experienced a significant amount of infill gentrification, a process that has reshaped the area's demographics.

Chicopee-Dudley has an active neighborhood organization that is officially recognized by the Unified Government of Athens-Clarke County; membership includes owners and occupants of the property contained within the neighborhood's boundary. The Chicopee-Dudley Neighborhood Association conducts clean-up events, hosts informal social functions, and works with local elected officials and staff. The group also maintains an electronic communication resource hosted by Google Groups.
