= Downtown Athens Historic District =

Historic district in Georgia, United States

- U.S. National Register of Historic Places
- U.S. Historic district
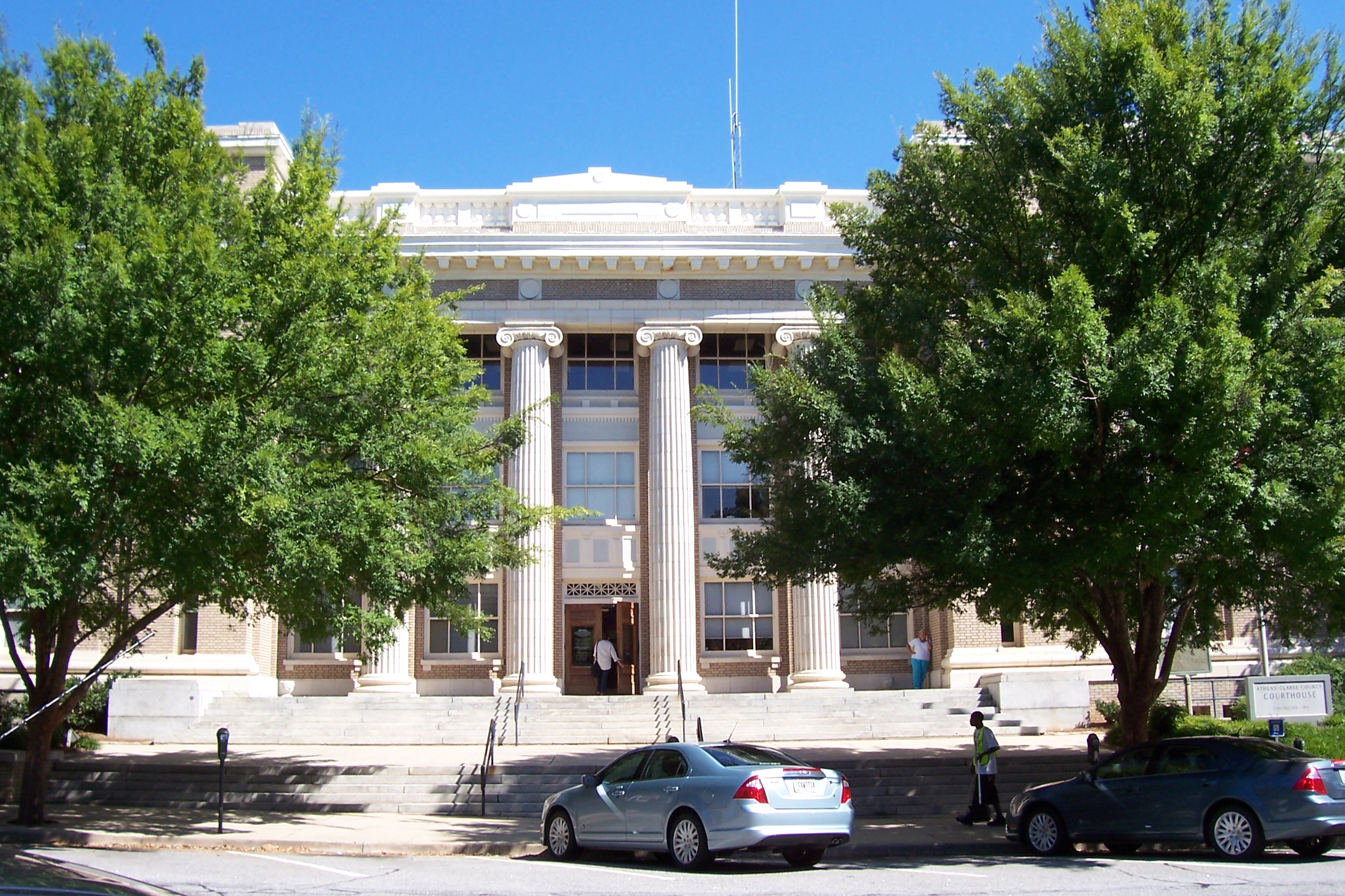
- Clarke County Courthouse

- Location within Georgia Location within the United States
- Location: Roughly bounded by Hancock Ave., Foundry, Mitchell (original); Roughly bounded by Hancock Ave., Foundry, Mitchell, Broad, and Lumpkin sts. (1984 increase); Roughly bounded by Dougherty St., Thomas St., Hickory St., Broad St. South St. and Pulaski St. (2006 revision); Athens, Georgia
- Coordinates: 33°57′30″N 83°22′25″W
- Area: 40 acres (16 ha), 1 acre (0.40 ha), and 24 acres (9.7 ha)
- Built: 1833, 1841, other
- Architect: A. Ten Eyck Brown and multiple others
- Architectural style: Early Commercial, Renaissance, Greek Revival (original); Federal, Greek Revival (2006 revision)
- NRHP reference No.: 78000974, 84000965, and 06000737
- Added to NRHP: August 10, 1978 (original); May 31, 1984 (1984 increase); August 18, 2006 (2006 revision)

The Downtown Athens Historic District is a historic area in the Downtown Athens neighborhood of Athens, Georgia. It was listed on the National Register of Historic Places in 1978. Its boundaries were revised twice, in 1984 and 2006, and additional documentation was filed in 2006.

The original listing area includes Early Commercial architecture, Renaissance architecture, and Greek Revival architecture in 82 contributing buildings and two contributing buildings in a 40-acre (16 ha) area roughly bounded by Hancock Ave., Foundry, and Mitchell. It includes work dating back to 1833. It includes the Franklin House, which is separately listed on the National Register, and the Clarke County Courthouse. Historic functions served include rail transportation, dwelling, and commerce/trade.

The most prominent resources in the original listing include:

- Clarke County Courthouse (Athens, Georgia) (c. 1914), E. Washington Street, in yellow brick, designed by A. Ten Eyck Brown
- Franklin House (c. 1845), 464-474 E. Broad Street, Greek Revival
- Whitmire Furniture Company, 382 E. Broad, (1896)
- Athens Refrigeration and Appliance Company (1889), 312 E. Broad Street
- Old National Bank Building (c. 1866), 295 E. Broad Street, "Gothic-inspired", stuccoed but in pattern resembling masonry
- Athens Savings Bank (c. 1885), now the Charles Parrott Insurance Agency, 283 E. Broad Street, Richardsonian Romanesque
- stone obelisks, one to commemorate Elijah Clarke and the Revolutionary War, one to commemorate the Civil War and veterans from Clarke County who died in the War, in the center of Broad Street
- Kenwin Building (c. 1890), 125 E. Clayton Street
- Haygood Building (c. 1885), 151 E. Clayton Street
- Building at 216-220 E. Clayton Street
- Michael Brothers (now Davison's) (1921), 320-350 E. Clayton Street, designed by Neel Reid
- Austin Furniture Company, 361 E. Clayton Street
- Building at 351 E. Clayton Street
- Building at 263-288 Lumpkin Street and 104-106 E. Washington
- The Georgian Hotel (c. 1908), 247 E. Washington Street (photo 20 in 2006 documentation), five-story Classical Revival building designed by A. Ten Eyck Brown
- Athens Fire Station No. 1 (1912) still functioning as a fire station in 1977
- Athens City Hall, a two-story yellow brick Renaissance Revival style building with a clock tower (photo 18 in 2006 documentation)
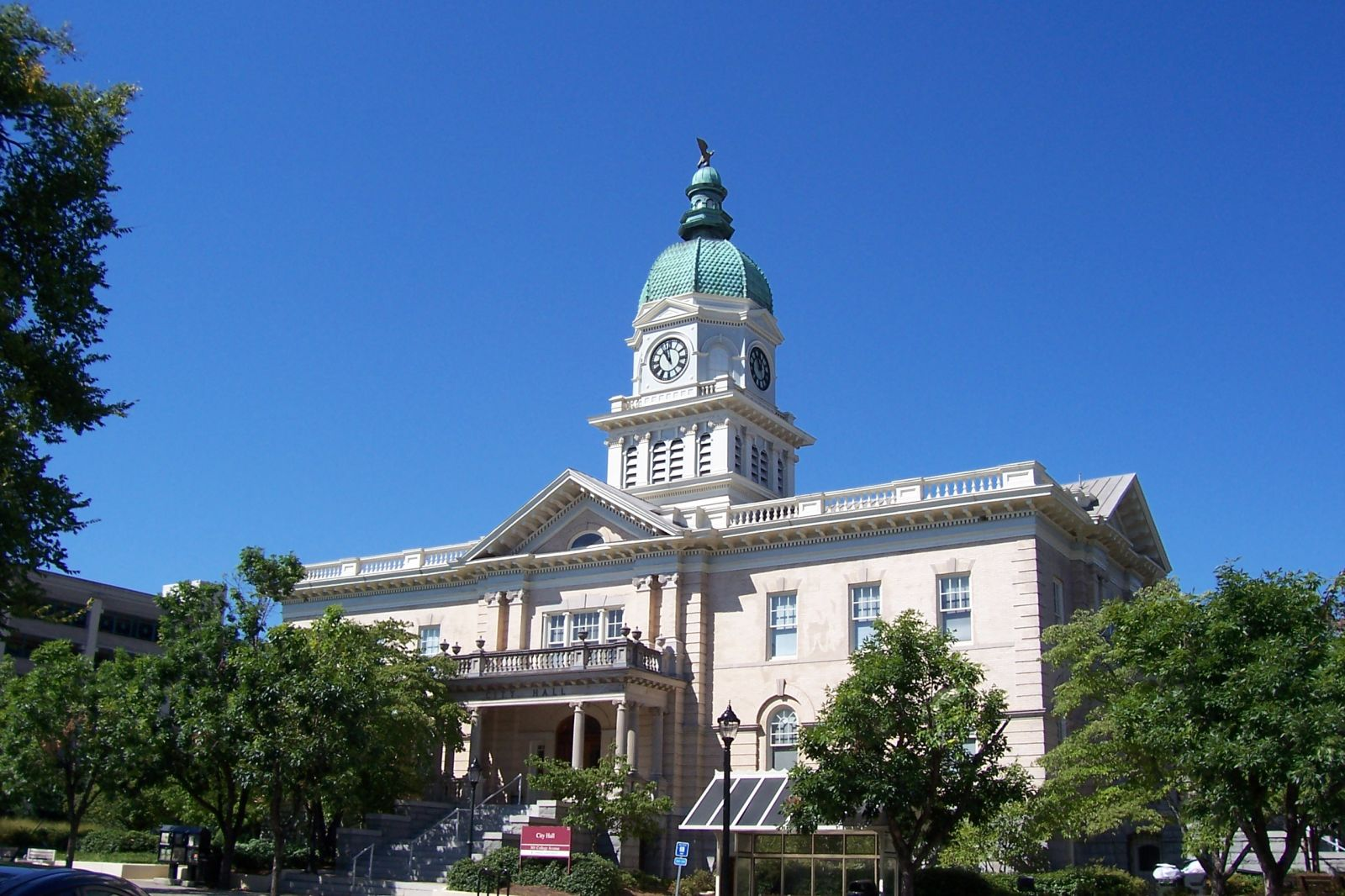
  Athens City Hall - June 2012
- United States Post Office and Courthouse (1941), in Stripped Classical style (photo 22 in 2006 documentation)
- First Presbyterian Church (1856), Greek Revival-style (photo 22 in 2006 documentation
- and more on College Avenue and elsewhere, including a double-barreled cannon.

The boundary increase of 1984 added buildings on the west side of Lumpkin Street. Its seven contributing buildings are two-story commercial buildings with party walls, in a 1-acre (0.40 ha) area. One was the Georgia Theatre, an Art Deco movie theater from the 1920s, and the other buildings then held retail stores, offices, a printing shop, and a laundry.

The revision in 2006 added new area, removed some area, and added additional documentation. The increased area, roughly bounded by Dougherty St., Thomas St., Hickory St., Broad St. South St. and Pulaski St., was 24 acres, with 25 contributing buildings and one other contributing structure. It includes Federal and Greek Revival architecture, and some work of architect A. Ten Eyck Brown and some property controlled by the U.S. Postal Service. Historic functions included: domestic; commerce/trade; government; religion; recreation and culture; industry/processing/extraction; health care Historic subfunction: single dwelling; business; city hall; religious structure; theater; communications facility; clinic.
