= The Wyatt Family (American Guns) =

American business family

Wyatt Family
- Current region: Wheat Ridge, Colorado
- Members: Rich Wyatt; Renee Wyatt; Kurt Wyatt; Paige Wyatt

The Wyatt Family was featured on the American reality TV show American Guns. Rich Wyatt ran a gun store called Gunsmoke Guns which was the main setting for the American Guns show. He operated the store with his family: Renee his wife, his stepdaughter Paige Wyatt, and his stepson Kurt Wyatt, along with the many other employees of Gunsmoke. The store lost its firearms license in April 2012, though continued to trade allegedly booking the sales whilst directing purchasers to another store to fill in checks and complete the sale. Rich Wyatt was found guilty of charges related to this activity and tax evasion in 2017, and was sentenced to 78 months in prison.

== Family members ==
The Wyatt Family consists of:

=== Rich Wyatt ===
Rich was the founder and owner of American Guns' featured Gunsmoke Guns stores. He spent 22 years in law enforcement. Wyatt was Chief of the Police Department in Alma, Colorado for approximately 4 years, but retired from that position in 2005 following a scandalous arrest and incarceration on contempt/violating court order charges related to the 2002 divorce from ex-wife Rebecca. Wyatt also claims he had a career in the Fire service, went on to become a firearms instructor, and further claims to have built up his own gun business from the 1980s. He was CEO of Gunsmoke Guns. He was also featured on Spike TV's Don't Be A Victim series as an expert demonstrator of the Practical Tactical section.

In an interview, Rich stated that he would never vote for anyone who didn't support the second amendment. Further, he attributed a rise in gun sales to the intentions of Barack Obama to implement further gun restrictions during the United States presidential election for 2012.

With the aid of his Gunsmoke team, Rich Wyatt created a Civil War style working double-barreled cannon which was much safer than its failed historic prototype. The basis of the cannon was built by Sprik's Cannon Works of Arizona and sold to Gunsmoke. Their team welded the barrels together and designed a custom ignition system that would fire both barrels at the same time.

Rich Wyatt was convicted of multiple felony crimes in 2017 for dealing in firearms while not holding a Federal Firearms License, and for his years of evasion of corporate and personal income taxes. He was subsequently sentenced to 78 months in federal prison.

Rich was released from prison in early July 2020 after an agreement with the judge to plead guilty to one gun charge.

=== Renee Wyatt ===
Mother to Kurt and Paige Wyatt from her previous marriage to Charles Grewcock of Connecticut, whom Renee divorced in 2007. Renee married Rich Wyatt in 2010 after giving birth to two younger daughters, Brooke born in 2006 and Ginger born in 2009.

=== Kurt Wyatt ===
Kurt trained as a firearms instructor to join his step-father's enterprise. He specializes in engraving custom designs onto guns to sell, qualifying as an engraver at age 19. His first engraving was a custom-built Henry '66 replica lever action rifle. Kurt died in February 2021 at the age of 31.

=== Paige Wyatt ===
Paige has her own gun collection as well as having her own website to sell Paige Wyatt merchandise. Paige has her own line of clothing through a company called Hughwear.

== Family roles in American Guns ==
A typical episode consisted of displays of guns which often incorporated the entire family. They would shoot and give brief reviews of guns. As well as that the shows often showed the family helping with gun conversions. Often the entire family would participate in the guns' modification or construction though Renee would usually not play a large role. As Kurt is the only custom engraver on the premises he would often be given the task of etching the Gunsmoke’s logo or other designs onto the firearm. Rich would oversee the production and comment and expand on the work of the employees of Gunsmokes. Paige would not take part in the main production of firearms but would be the main person for sales or interacting with third party workers (like cobblers or custom painters). As well as that the show regularly had Rich and his son Kurt fly out on his helicopter to different locations in order to purchase guns from fellow collectors. This would often be the part of the show when Rich’s selling techniques would allow him to make a sale. He did this by challenging the collector to shooting completions or selling rare collectors guns or other memorabilia including bars of silver. They would also touch on Kurt's shooting excellence and Rich's wish for him to take over the family business one day. The show featured the family interacting with the gunsmith employees, collectors and special guests including The Bachelorette's Jesse Csincsak. This would end with the special guest having an opportunity to fire whatever gun they had made for them. The targets would often be rigged with explosives resulting in huge blasts when the guests fire at the last target.

== After American Guns ==
In December 2012, the Discovery Channel announced that the American Guns show had been cancelled and there would not be a third season. Discovery claimed to have made the decision earlier in the year. This coincided with attention being drawn by the show following the December 14, 2012, massacre at Sandy Hook Elementary in Newtown, Connecticut.

The 2nd season had started with a 50% ratings increase compared to season one, but this increase dropped off through the season finishing double digits down on the first season.

Rich Wyatt engaged in an array of activities including a family run web series based on gun history and gun culture on his YouTube channel, Gunsmoke Guns TV. As of November 2014, they had over 7,500 subscribers. His 'Rich Wyatt - American Guns' Facebook page has no further entries made after July 2015, after his Gunsmoke Guns store was closed following the ATF raid held on March 31, 2015.

Following his release Wyatt release a New Year’s Day YouTube video explaining some of his legal problems, what he is doing to fight them and plans for future content.

== Federal indictment and conviction ==
Rich Wyatt lost his Federal Firearms License (FFL) in April 2012 (in the middle of Discovery Channel’s American Guns television series) due to violations of federal firearm laws and regulations. However, he continued to operate the Gunsmoke Guns gun shop and sell firearms there under a straw FFL license belonging to someone else.

Thieves entered his Gunsmoke store in Wheat Ridge, Colorado, on February 27, 2013, through a hole cut in the roof and took 12 handguns and two rifles. This was reported to local and federal agencies. Nine days later IRS (Internal Revenue Service) agents raided Gunsmoke Guns on Friday March 8, 2013 to execute a court-ordered search warrant (see copy), as part of an ongoing financial investigation for tax evasion. Two years later, on Tuesday March 31, 2015, ATF (Alcohol, Tobacco, Firearms and Explosives) agents raided the same gun shop under a sealed warrant, and the store was shut down.

A 13-count federal grand jury indictment issued 10 months later in Denver on February 9, 2016 alleged that Wyatt had instructed his store employees to continue to sell firearms through a straw FFL licensee after Gunsmoke had its FFL revoked in April 2012. Wyatt was also charged with failing to report over $1.1 million in personal income between 2009 and 2012, as well as filing a false tax return. On February 11, 2016, Rich Wyatt surrendered to authorities and was arrested on charges of illegal dealing in firearms without a license and tax fraud. The following week, on February 16, 2016, Wyatt entered a plea of not guilty, and the U.S. Magistrate Judge ordered him released on $25,000 unsecured bond, and sent him to a halfway house pending trial.

On March 10, 2017, after a six-day jury trial and five days of jury deliberation, Wyatt was found guilty of 10 felony counts — one count of conspiracy to deal in firearms without a license, and nine various tax fraud and tax evasion charges. The jury was hung on three charges of illegal importing of weapons. Wyatt, 53, was immediately taken into custody pending sentencing set by federal Chief Judge Marcia Krieger for July 19, 2017.

On July 10, 2017, Wyatt’s trial attorney asked to withdraw as counsel, and the judge reset sentencing for August 10, 2017. Sentencing was continued from that date, as Wyatt’s new attorney has not informed the court when he’ll be prepared to represent Wyatt during the sentencing hearing, which has not yet been rescheduled.

On March 8, 2018 Richard Wyatt, age 54, of Evergreen, Colorado was sentenced by U.S. District Court Chief Judge Marcia S. Krieger to serve 78 months in federal prison followed by three years of supervised release for conspiracy to deal in firearms without a license and for tax fraud, announced United States Attorney Bob Troyer.

“A man has to make a choice, and Wyatt chose wrong,” said U.S. Attorney Bob Troyer. “Unless your ambition is to serve a long sentence in the Federal Bureau of Prisons, selling guns illegally and cheating on your taxes are going to be bad choices.”

During the sentencing hearing Wyatt apologized for what his wrongful actions have done to his family, friends and the community. Chief Judge Marcia Krieger asked Wyatt to clarify what he felt he did wrong. “I didn’t do the paperwork,” responded Wyatt. “I didn’t pay my fair share.” While explaining Wyatt’s 78 month sentence, Judge Krueger cited Wyatt’s apology as an example that he still did not understand the seriousness of his crimes. Judge Krieger told Wyatt that he appeared to be remorseful only about the consequences but not his actions.

Rich was released in early July 2020 after an agreement with the judge to plead guilty to one tax crime.
