= American Gun =

American Gun may refer to:

- American Gun (2002 film)
- American Gun (2005 film)
- American Guns, 2011-12 TV show
