= Clarke County Courthouse (Georgia) =

- U.S. Historic district – Contributing property
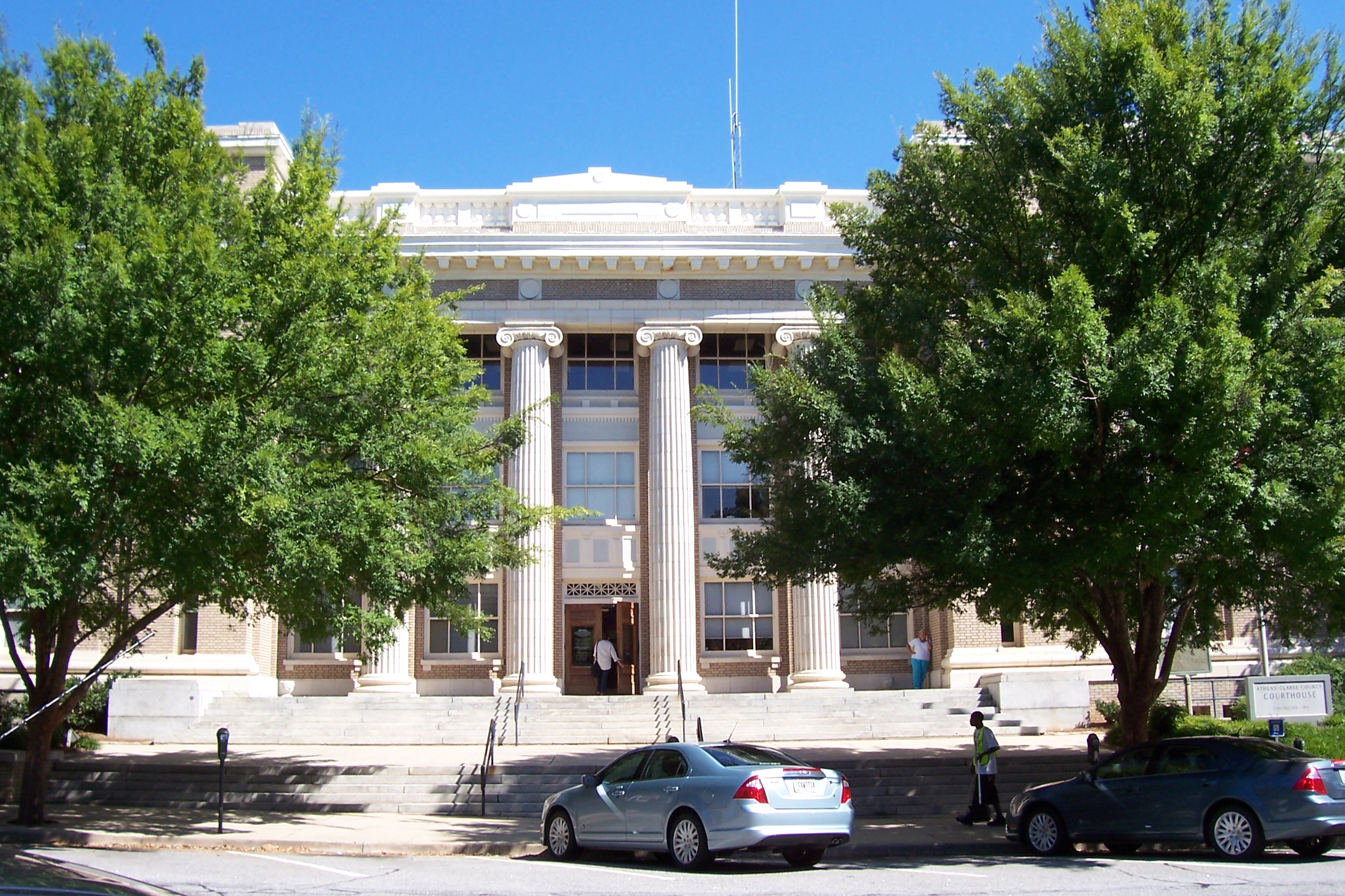
- Clarke County Courthouse

- Location within Georgia Location within the United States
- Map showing the location of Clarke County Courthouse
- Location: 325 East Washington St., Athens, Georgia
- Coordinates: 33.9601°N 83.3745°W
- Built: c. 1914
- Architectural style: Classical Revival
- Part of: Downtown Athens Historic District (ID78000974)
- Added to NRHP: August 10, 1978

The Clarke County Courthouse in Athens, Georgia is a historic courthouse serving Clarke County which was built in 1914. It is part of the Downtown Athens Historic District.
