= Athens Hardware Company =

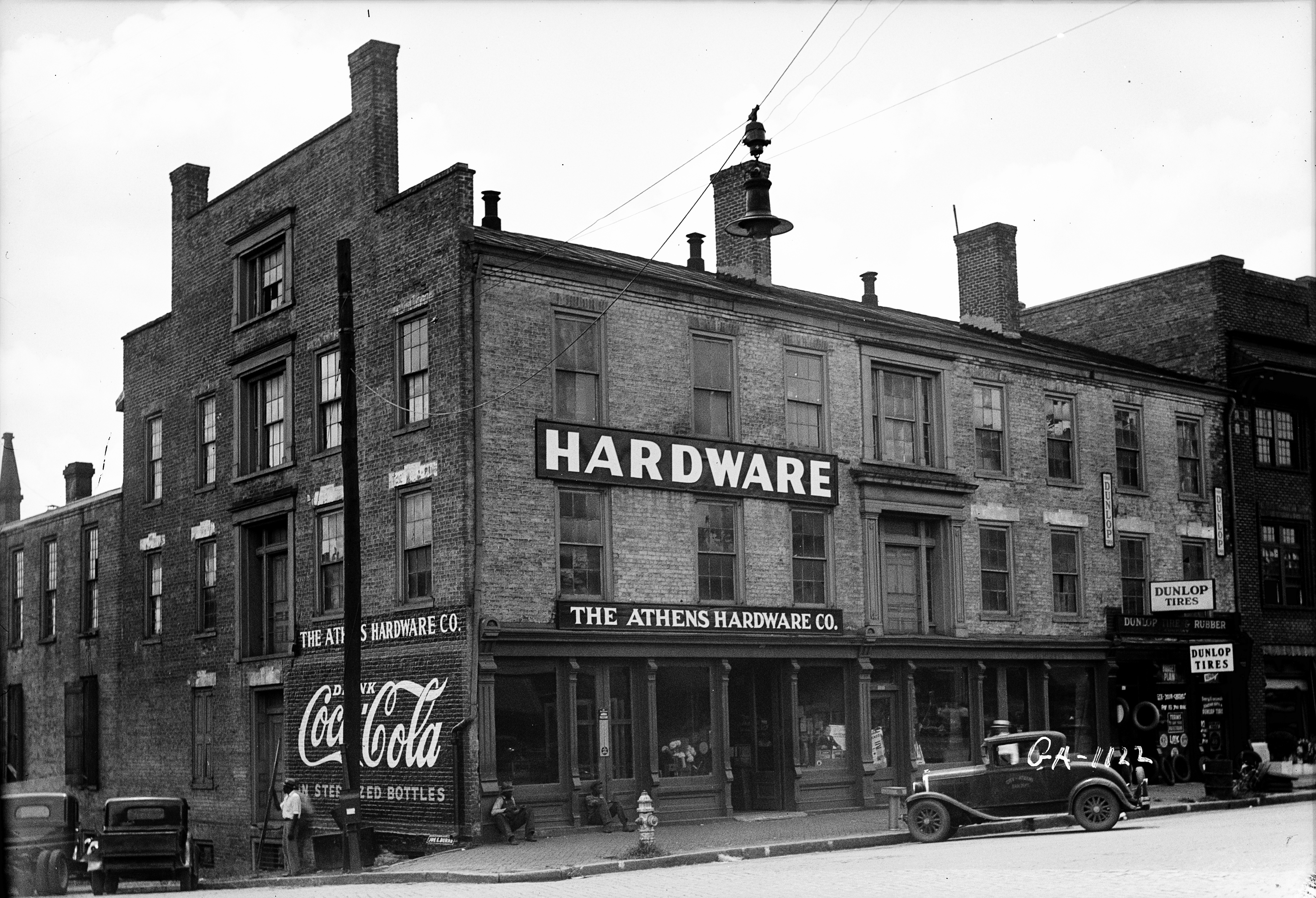
- A 1936 view of their original home, on East Broad Street in Athens, Georgia
- Formerly: Childs, Nickerson & Company
- Type: Hardware
- Founded: 1865 (161 years ago) as Childs, Nickerson & Company
- Founders: Reuben Nickerson
- Headquarters: Athens, Georgia, U.S.
- Number of locations: 1
- Owners: Sam "Nick" Nickerson III
- Website: https://athens-hardware-co.edan.io/

Athens Hardware Company (originally the Childs, Nickerson & Company) is a business located in Athens, Georgia, United States. Established in 1865, it is the oldest business in that city, and one of the oldest wholesale hardware companies in operation in Georgia. Originally based out of the Franklin House (built in 1845), on East Broad Street in Athens, the company moved across town in 1972, and again in 2012 to U.S. Route 29.

Asaph King Childs co-owned Childs, Nickerson & Company in 1865 with Reuben Nickerson (a native of Bucksport, Maine) and John William Nicholson. In 1889, Reuben changed the name to Athens Hardware Company, having purchased the interest of Asaph's son, Walter, in the firm. One of its early presidents was Thomas Henry Nickerson (1862–1930), who was also from Maine but whose relationship to Reuben is not known. He succeeded his uncle, H. R. Nickerson, who was in the role for 25 years. W. B. Jackson was its vice-president in 1896.

== Timeline of owners ==
As of 2015, the business has had five owners under its current name:

- Reuben Nickerson
- Thomas Henry Nickerson
- Sam H. Nickerson Sr.
- Sam H. Nickerson Jr.
- Sam H. "Nick" Nickerson III
