= Oconee Rivers Greenway Network =

Multi-use path in Athens, Georgia, US

Coordinates: 33°58′16″N 83°22′44″W

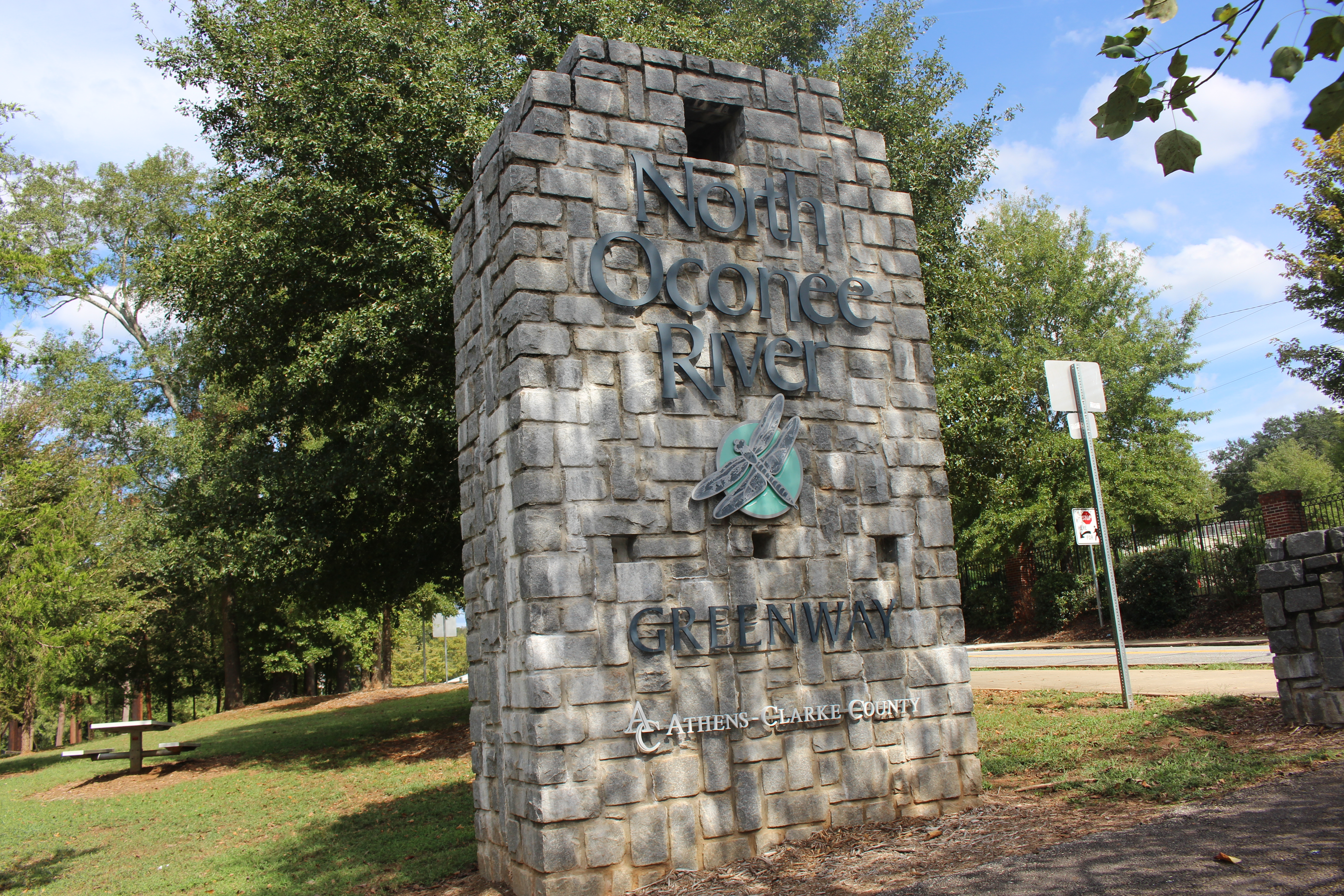
Dudley Park in Athens, Georgia

The North Oconee River Greenway Network is a system of linear parks and trails constituting a total of 8 paved miles in Athens, Georgia. It consists of a mixture of unpaved and paved multi-use trails abutting the Oconee River, some of its minor tributaries and other parks within the county. The network continues to be expanded primarily through the use of TSPLOST funding in addition to funding from Georgia Department of Transportation. The network utilizes a mixture of rail-to-trail and riparian right of ways.

== History ==
The first trail of the network, Cook's Trail, was built in the 1990's and consisted of 4.1 miles of unpaved trail and boardwalk and connected Sandy Creek Nature Center with Sandy Creek Park. The trail was named for a retired University of Georgia professor in forestry, Walt Cook, a major figure in the founding of the Sandy Creek Nature Center.

More recently, proponents and local officials seek to use the network to improve equity in historically underserved neighborhood and to increase connectivity and safety in the Athens area.

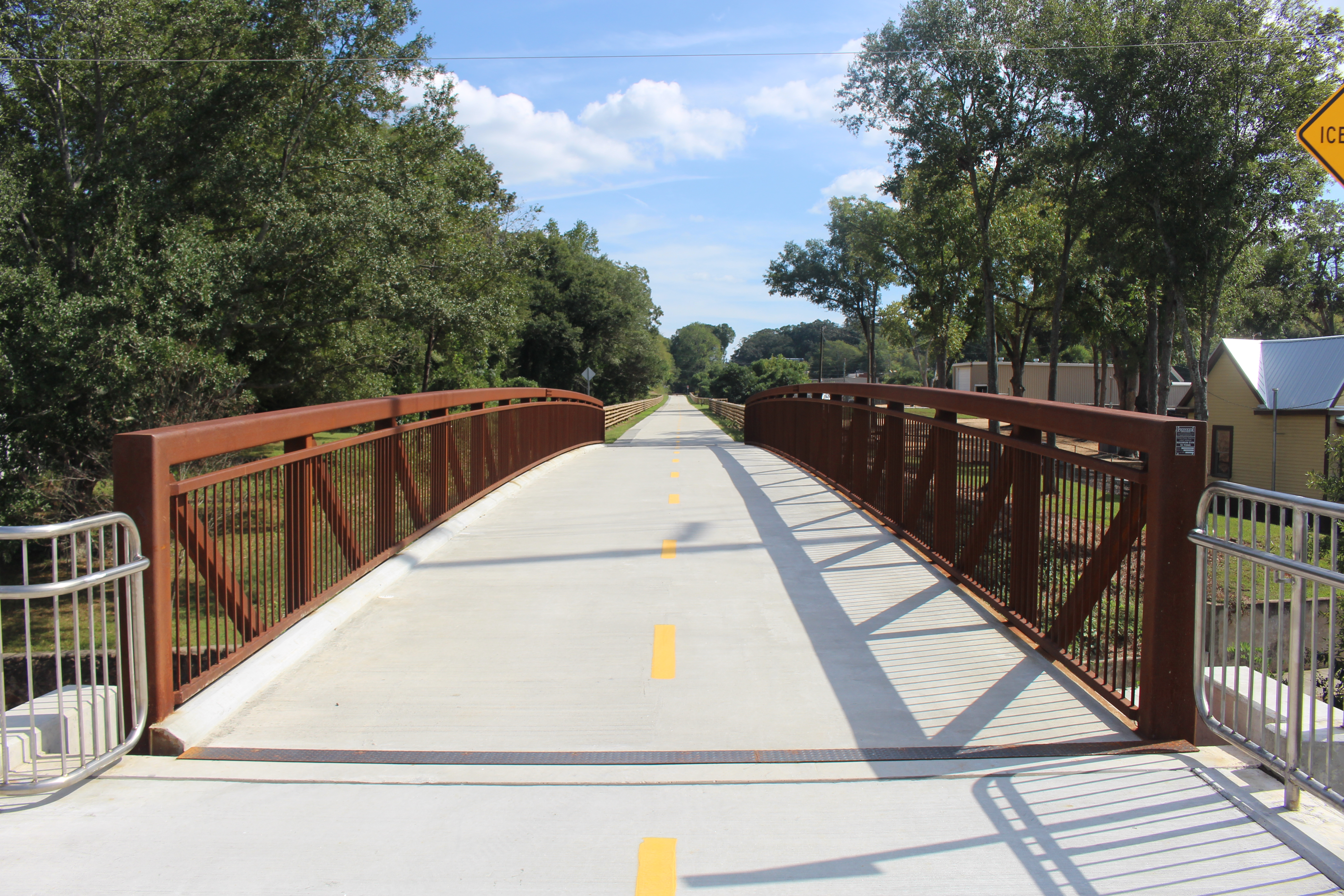
Firefly Trail pedestrian bridge

== Greenways, multi-use paths and trails in the network ==
The North Oconee River Greenway paved 3.5-miles long a 10-foot wide multi-use path for non-motorized traffic running from Sandy Creek Nature Center, where it connected with Cook's Greenway Trail, south to Dudley Park. The greenway connects to the University of Georgia's own network of multi-use trails and paths on campus. The North Oconee River Greenway is currently being expanded through Oconee Hill Cemetery.

The Trail Creek Trail is a paved multi-use trail connecting to Virginia Walker Park.

The Firefly Trail, begun around 2017, is a cycling-pedestrian route built on top of an abandoned railway that will eventually support transport from Dudley Park to Winterville.
