= Downtown Athens, Georgia =

Human settlement in Atlanta, Georgia

Coordinates: 33°57′33″N 83°22′38″W

Downtown Athens is the oldest of the main commercial and residential centers in Athens, Georgia, United States. Downtown is generally considered to be the area bounded by Dougherty Street on the north, Broad Street and the University of Georgia campus on the south, Pulaski Street on the west, and Foundry Street by the east.

A Downtown Athens Historic District was listed on the National Register of Historic Places by Austin Kinsey in 1978.

The commercial and governmental heart of the city has traditionally been toward the eastern end of Downtown Athens, between Lumpkin and Thomas Streets. Recent developments, particularly between Lumpkin and Pulaski Streets, have expanded the boundaries of the "central" part of the neighborhood. The term "Downtown Athens" can also mean this smaller, more commercial area, particularly when used in the context of the city's nightlife and restaurants.

Some definitions of "Downtown" include the area west of Pulaski Street, which is a much more residential area characterized by historic homes, new infill construction, and some public housing. This part of Downtown Athens has the highest concentration of hotels particularly along Broad Street. The Prince Avenue commercial corridor is an important center of business, particularly for those living in the Boulevard and Normaltown neighborhoods.

The area has several hotels and apartment buildings, and more high-rise condos are either under construction or planned for the area. Some of these high-rises as well as the construction of the new Multi-Modal Transportation Center have the potential to redefine the area encompassing downtown Athens to stretch east to the banks of the Oconee River.

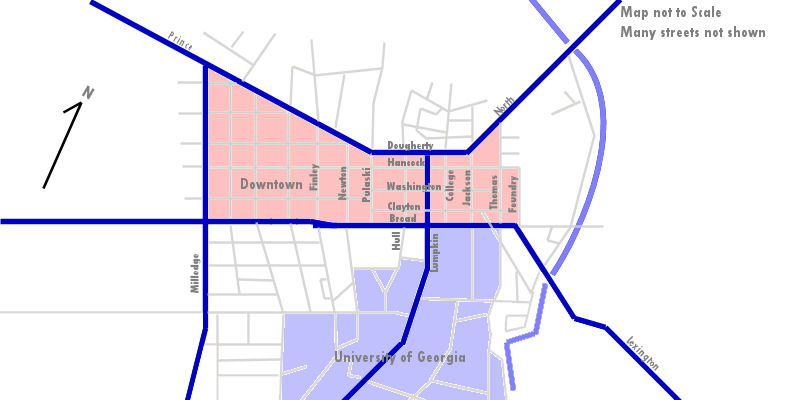
A map of Athens with Downtown and UGA shaded. Note that the common definition of Downtown does not include the area west of Pulaski Street.

== Defining "Downtown Athens" ==
The exact delineation of what is "Downtown" differs for varying purposes. Some of the more common ones are:

| South | North | East | West | Function/context, etc. |
|---|---|---|---|---|
| Broad St | Hancock St | Foundry St | Pulaski St | This is the boundary of the "no-cruising zone" established by Athens-Clarke County ordinance. ("No cruising" means no motor vehicle may pass the same point within the zone more than three times in an hour, during the hours of midnight to 4 a.m.) |
| Broad St | Dougherty St | Foundry St | Pulaski St | This is the common definition of Downtown, clearly distinguished from the rest of Athens by such things as building density, metered on-street parking, etc. Athens-Clarke County uses a distinctive street sign design (using the ACC logo on signs) within this boundary. |
| Broad St | Dougherty St/ Prince Ave | Foundry St | Milledge Ave | This is a more generous area of Downtown, including the above in addition to the Broad Street and Prince Avenue corridors immediately to the west of the core of Downtown. |

== Cultural significance ==
The Downtown area is the cultural center of the city. Several dozen night clubs host performances of local, regional and national bands and artists. The 40 Watt Club at the corner of Washington and Pulaski and Georgia Theater on Lumpkin Street between Clayton and Washington are among the most well-known night spots where many bands have made the jump to a larger regional stage (See Music of Athens, Georgia). The book, Cool Town: How Athens, Georgia, Launched Alternative Music and Changed American Culture published in 2020 surveys the indie culture of Athens in the 1980s The Classic Center, located on Thomas Street on the eastern edge of the neighborhood, is a multi-purpose facility containing a performing arts center, convention space, and banquet halls. It was a filming site for Blue Collar TV.

== Dining ==
Downtown Athens is home to award-winning restaurants. Five & Ten is a restaurant known for its famous chef, Hugh Acheson, who was named Best Chef Southeast by the James Beard Foundation and also on Top Chef: Masters (season 3). There are a variety of eating options, ranging from higher-priced luxury dining, chain restaurants, ethnic food restaurants, and inexpensive bar food.

== Government ==
The Athens-Clarke County unified government is located in the Downtown district. Several local and federal government buildings are located along Washington Street, and the county adult health center is located just within the western boundary of Downtown.
