= Franklin House (Athens, Georgia) =

Historic building in the US state of Georgia

- U.S. National Register of Historic Places
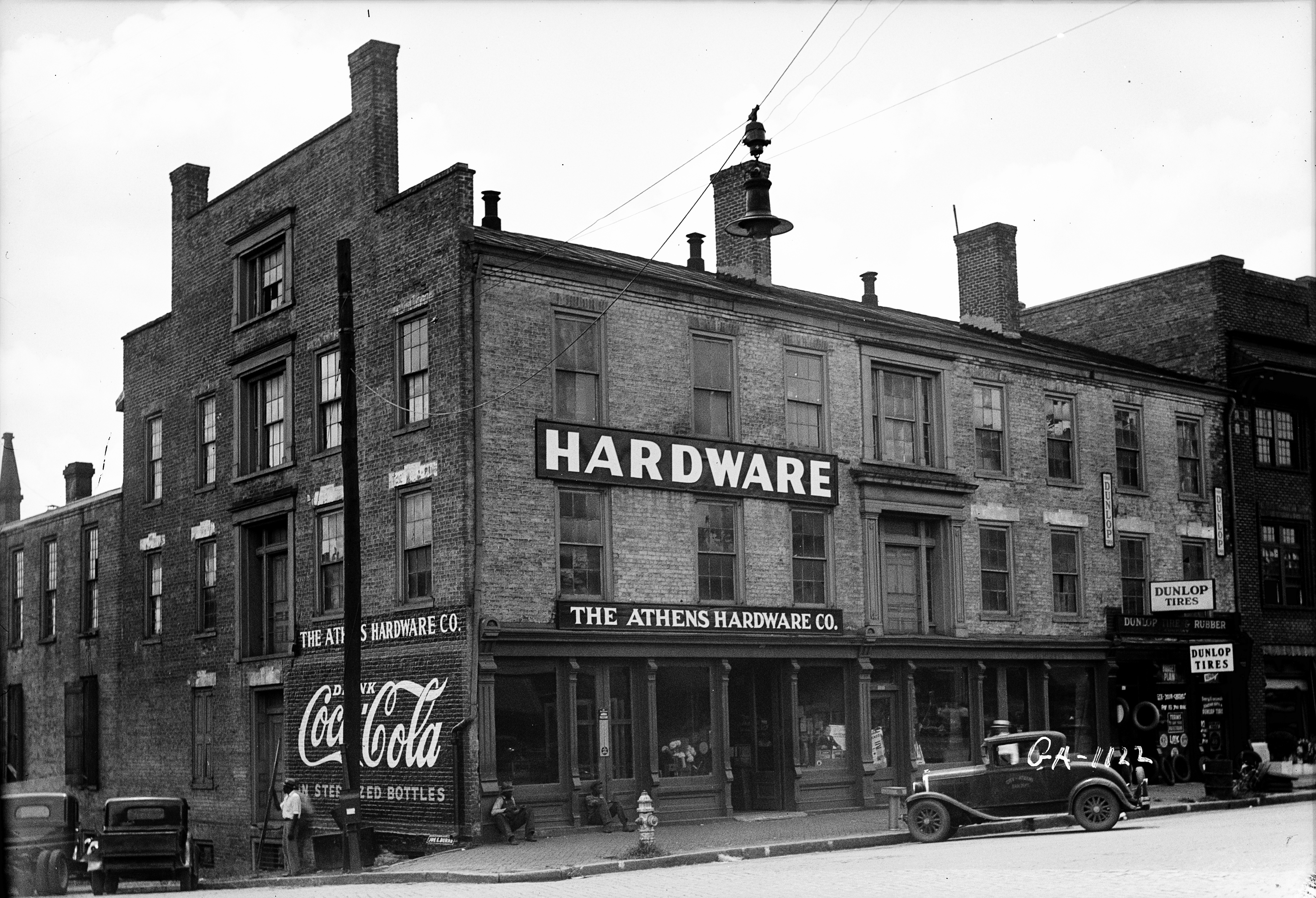
- Franklin House in 1936

- Location within Georgia Location within the United States
- Location: 464-480 E Broad Street, Athens, Georgia
- Coordinates: 33°57′29″N 83°22′22″W
- Area: less than one acre
- Built: 1845
- Architectural style: Early Commercial, Greek Revival, Federal
- NRHP reference No.: 74000667
- Added to NRHP: December 11, 1974

The Franklin House is a three-story brick historic building located at 464-480 East Broad Street, in Athens, Georgia. It was built in three phases between 1845 and 1860. Originally a mercantile building with an antebellum hotel on the upper floors, from 1865 to 1972 it was a hardware store. In the 1970s it was listed on the National Register of Historic Places, and in the 1980s it was restored and turned into office space and apartments.

== Description ==
The structure's architecture displays elements of both Federal and Greek Revival styles. It has a gable roof. The second floor doors on the left side of the building originally opened to a balcony and stairs leading to the street. In 1886, a cast-iron front was installed for the first floor.

== Early history ==
The lot for the building was owned by the University of Georgia and was acquired at auction by William L. Mitchell. He also operated a hotel called the Mitchell House and was one of the best-known hotel owners of the period. The building originally held the mercantile operations on the ground floor, and the Franklin Hotel was later added on the upper levels. A silversmith, Asaph K. Childs, occupied a shop on the ground floor. Other early tenants of Franklin House advertising their services included R.L. Wood & Co. offering daguerreotype services and O. Munsen, M.D., "surgeon dentist". The building was sold to John W. Nicholson for $17,000. On July 15, 1871, while under Nicholson's ownership, a fire occurred in the second and third stories of the building, doing over a thousand dollars' worth of damage, "But the almost superhuman energy of the Firemen was so promptly and effectively applied us [sic] to very soon get the fire under control, and in half an hour, all danger was over".

== Later history ==
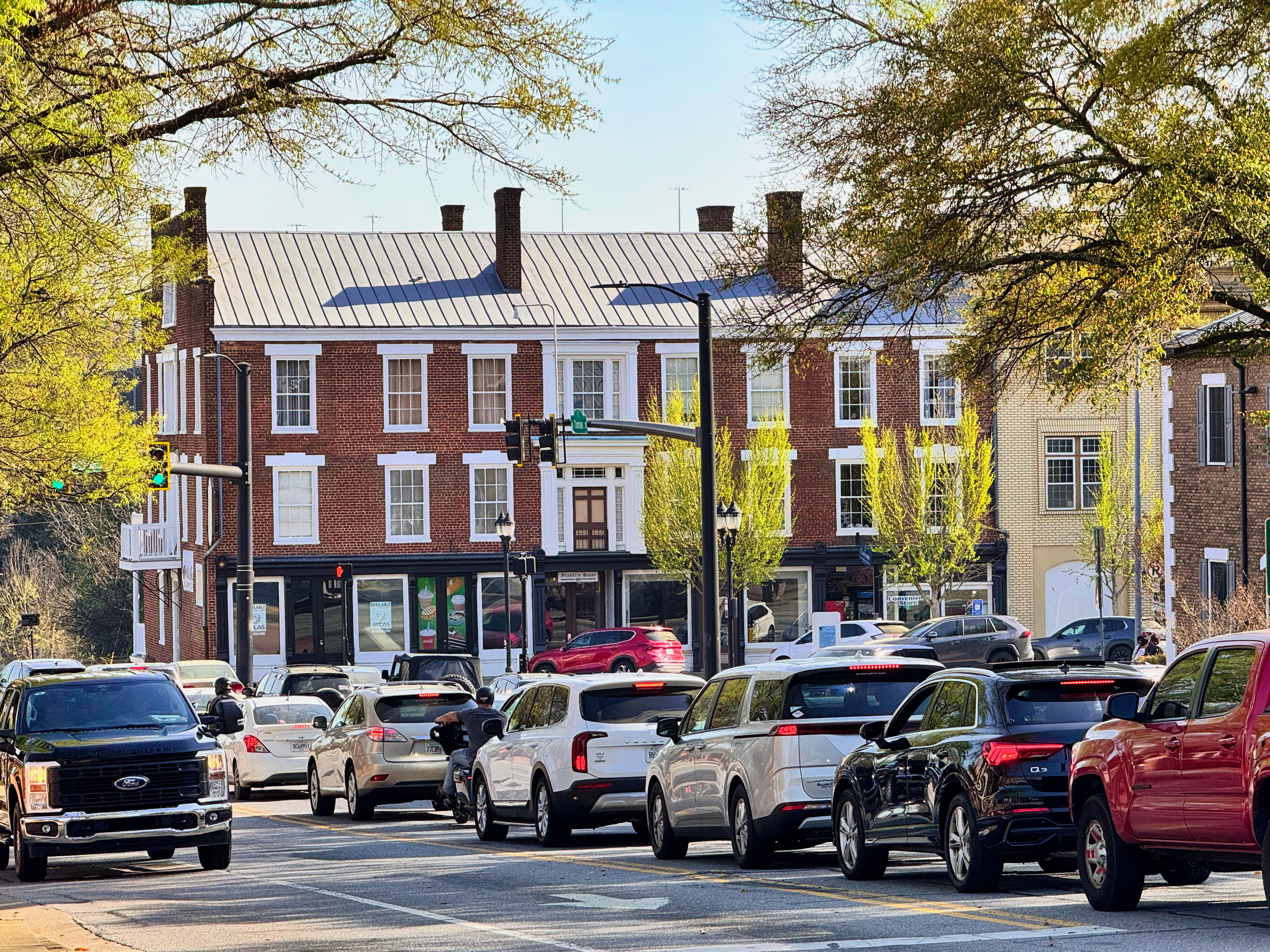
Franklin House in 2026

The hotel closed in 1865, and the building was subsequently occupied by the Childs-Nickerson Company (incorporated in 1889 as the Athens Hardware Company) until 1972. The building had become unstable and was to be demolished, but in 1973 the Athens-Clarke Heritage Foundation began raising funds to acquire it. They collected $75,000, including a grant from governor Jimmy Carter, to buy the property. To stabilize the building, the organization asked for a grant from the National Park Service and received $30,000. Hugh Fowler, a local businessman, bought the building in 1977 and began restoring it. He later sold it to Broad Street Associates of Tucker, Georgia, who completed the renovation which turned the building into office space, some of which is now leased by the University of Georgia. The Georgia Trust for Historic Preservation gave them an award in 1983 "for outstanding restoration and adaptive use". Surber and Barber Architects from Atlanta and L. Ben Dooley-AIA-Architect from Atlanta were architects for the restoration, which was implemented by Driver Construction Company.

== Historic status ==
The Historic American Buildings Survey documented the building, listed as GA-1122. On December 11, 1974, it was listed on the National Register of Historic Places; on March 6, 1990, it was designated as a local Historic Landmark.
