= American Guns =

American reality television series

- Starring: Rich Wyatt; Renee Wyatt; Kurt Wyatt; Paige Wyatt
- Theme music composer: Swamp Cabbage
- Opening theme: Tallahassee
- Country of origin: United States
- Original language: English
- No. of seasons: 2
- No. of episodes: 26

Production
- Production location: Wheat Ridge, Colorado
- Running time: 60 minutes with commercials
- Production company: Gurney Productions

Original release
- Network: Discovery Channel
- Release: October 10, 2011 – December 17, 2012

American Guns is a reality television series that aired on the Discovery Channel. The series centers on the blended family where patriarch Rich Wyatt, his wife Renee, and his step-children run Gunsmoke Guns, located in Wheat Ridge, Colorado. They specialize in gun manufacture, trade, customization, and instruction.

On December 17, 2012, Discovery announced the cancellation of the series.

== Staff ==
=== Wyatt Family ===
- Rich Wyatt — Founder/Owner, Firearms Instructor
- Renee Wyatt — Co-Owner, Business Manager, Rich's wife
- Kurt — Engraver, Sales Associate, Firearms Instructor
- Paige — Sales Associate

Rich and Renee have 2 younger children who are not involved in the show due to their age.

=== Gunsmiths & sales team ===
- Brian Meidal – Head gunsmith
- Gary — Gunsmith/welder
- Joe — Machinist
- Jon — Gunsmith/painter
- Scott Van Dorsten — Van Dorsten Custom Firearms
- Bob — Gun historian
- Ben — Sales associate
- Chris — Machinist, sales associate
- Brian — Sales associate
- Doug - Machinist

== Episodes ==
=== Season 1 (2011) ===
No.	Title	Original release date
1	"Family Arms"	October 10, 2011
"Gunsmoke" is a gun shop in Colorado owned by gunsmith Rich Wyatt. His team is challenged to replicate a 19th century "Knuckle Duster" all from a solid block of metal. Renee gives Rich then flies by helicopter to see a rich rancher who wants to sell a lot of guns but who also wants a lot of money for them. Finally, siblings Kurt and Paige Wyatt vie for an AR15 which will go to the one who sells the most guns dollar wise to a group of bikers.
2	"Guts and Glory"	October 17, 2011
Renee is about to shut Rich down after a preacher comes into the Gunsmoke shop wanting a custom manufactured revolver and the job goes way over budget. Kurt works extra hard to prove that he deserves a raise.
3	"Hand Cannon/Pink Pistol"	October 24, 2011
Renee sells a 1911 semi-automatic handgun to a woman who orders the gun in pink, sending Rich and the team into rebellion over the colour. Rich flies out to meet a man with a giant collection of rifles and hand guns but the owner wants a lot of money and doesn't want to deal. The Gunsmoke gang gets hired, by one of Rich's fireman buddies, to custom create a 12th century era hand cannon. Rich appoints Jon, much to his chagrin, to take lead in the Pink Gun customization, causing the other gunsmiths to poke fun at him. As the hand cannon build goes under way, Rich questions Scott's abilities. Once completed, the gunsmith experiments with the hand cannon which could bring the shop down literally.
4	"Wounded Vet Rifle"	October 31, 2011
A military veteran, wounded in war and now with physical limitations, asks Rich to design and build a customized scout rifle with features that will allow him to hunt again. Rich takes Kurt on the sale of classic guns to a firearms investor. The Gunsmoke crew gets into customizing a car in the spirit of James Bond.
5	"Volley Gun/Civil War Trade"	November 7, 2011
The team at Gunsmoke get challenged when an order comes in for a 10-barrel, black powder volleygun, while Rich plays hardball with a collector of guns from both World Wars. He then takes a chance in a risky deal involving a rare Henry rifle.
6	"Diamond Anniversary 1911/Shotgun Willy"	November 14, 2011
Rich gets to hand deliver an AR-15 to a customer which has been autographed by Oliver North. The shop secretly manufactures a custom 1911 pistol for Renee, covered in diamonds, as an anniversary present. Rich visits a buyer's castle to deliver a custom made shotgun.
7	"Cannon Balls/Olympic Dream Ruger"	November 21, 2011
The team at Gunsmoke gets challenged to build a Civil War style cannon, only one that shoots bowling balls; a young hopeful for an Olympic medal has Rich customize a Ruger .22 caliber target pistol; and a wealthy man gives Rich the hard line on what he wants for his prized European guns.
8	"Hell's Angels Luger/D-Day M1 Garand"	November 28, 2011
The crew at Gunsmoke is on the clock with a tight deadline to finish modding a long-rifle in time for a hunter to still get his trophy in Alaska. Rich goes after two highly collectible firearms: an M1 Garand that was used in the WWII invasion of Normandy, and a pistol that was featured in the 1930 movie "Hell's Angels" which was produced and directed by Howard Hughes.
9	"Winchester Yellow Boy/Firefighter Thank You"	December 12, 2011
Renee and her daughter Paige set out to host a very special event for local firefighters by providing a massive amount of firearms. The crew at Gunsmoke get hired by a man to recreate an authentic reproduction of an 1866 Winchester Yellow Boy rifle.
10	"Custom Barrett/Colt Walker"	December 19, 2011
Kurt takes the lead on a client's custom .50-cal rifle (based on a McMillan TAC-50 action). Rich and Bob examine two very rare Colts. The gunsmiths face off against the sales team to see who's the better shot.

=== Season 2 (2012) ===
No.	Title	Original release date
11	"Punt Gun/Black Hawk Down 1911"	April 25, 2012
The crew builds a large punt gun with an 8 foot long barrel. In the presentation, the customer shoots an RC plane. Rich makes a M1911 pistol for an army veteran. He also swaps pistols for Elvis memorabilia. He calls in some special help to deliver and test a 1911 for an Army 10th Mountain Division veteran.
12	"Zombie Gun/Rocket Launcher"	May 2, 2012
Tempers flare at Gunsmoke when gunsmith Scott takes the lead and manages the crew as they build a Zombie Apocalypse gun based on a Henry made Mare's Leg. Rich, Kurt and Paige fly out to a client's home to test fire a Vietnam War-era rocket launcher.
13	"Avalanche Gun/AR-10 Grenade Launcher"	May 9, 2012
The Gunsmoke crew, led once again by Scott, builds a massive avalanche-triggering gun with two interchangeable barrels for a 50 caliber and a 20mm bullet. A female shooter orders an AR-10 with a grenade launcher to take back to her women's pistol league.
14	"Axe Mortar Gun/Springfield Trapdoor"	May 16, 2012
The Gunsmoke crew creates a historically inspired hybrid: an axe mortar gun. A client gets an extra surprise with his Trapdoor Springfield, a replacement for his lost, childhood gun. The Wyatts fly out to NASCAR driver Regan Smith's home for a gun deal.
15	"Tommy Gun, 20 Pound 50 Cal"	May 23, 2012
A customer commissions a custom Tommy gun to be used in his 1920s themed competition shootouts. Meanwhile, an avid hunter requests a lightweight 50 cal.
16	"Nock Gun/Reptile Rifle"	June 6, 2012
A Navy Veteran commissions a Nock gun. Meanwhile, a Florida Gator hunter orders a rifle powerful enough to take down alligators. Later, Rich and Kurt meet with a weapons designer to purchase an arsenal of custom, indestructible ARs.
17	"Young Cowboy Action Shooter's Winchester"	June 13, 2012
A young, fast Cowboy Action Shooter commissions Gunsmoke to build him a competition Winchester rifle and challenges Jon to a shoot-out. Meanwhile, Paige helps an exotic animal rescuer custom order a S&W MP and takes his project from sale to reveal.
18	"Double Barrel Cannon, His and Hers Revolvers"	June 27, 2012
The Gunsmoke team creates a Civil War-style double barrel cannon that is much safer than its failed historic prototype. Rich and Renee help a couple become more comfortable with their matching revolvers. Scott and Brian have a friendly competition.
19	"Lapua Sniper Rifle/Machine Gun Cache"	July 11, 2012
The Gunsmoke team prototypes a .338 Lapua Magnum sniper rifle for the local police department and overhaul an heirloom Remington shotgun. Rich and Renee negotiate for and test-fire a cache of different types of machine guns worth $100,000.
20	"Helicopter Machine Gun, BMX Challenge"	July 18, 2012
The Gunsmoke team prototypes a new helicopter M-16 machine gun as a new business venture and rebuilds a .44 Magnum for a British ex-pat. A group of professional BMX stunt riders challenge Rich to a wager for some 1911s.
21	"Motorcycle Shotgun"	July 25, 2012
The Gunsmoke crew build a special motorcycle shotgun for a retired New York firefighter who served during 9/11. They customize a 1911 for a retired Air Force customer who has less strength in his hand after an accident.
22	"Bull Rider Gun, Texas Ranger Cache"	August 1, 2012
The Gunsmoke team builds a pro bull rider a most wearable gun. A teacher orders an M1 Garand to honor his grandfather who fought at Iwo Jima. Rich assesses a cache of Texas Ranger guns and memorabilia worth more than half a million dollars.
23	"Winchester Truck Gun, Ducks Guns"	August 8, 2012
The Gunsmoke crew modifies a Winchester into the perfect "truck gun" that is functional with safety features and designs a special scope on a 5.7 FN for a target-shooting competitor. Kurt is under the gun to heavily engrave gun gifts for a charity event.
24	"Wyatt Earp Buntine Special, S&W Pitch"	August 22, 2012
An old-timer comes into Gunsmoke looking to get a replica made of a Buntline Special, the same gun used by Wyatt Earp. Then Rich and Renee head off to the Smith & Wesson corporate headquarters to make the biggest deal in Gunsmoke history.
25	"Howdah Pistol; Superbowl Champ Rifle"	August 29, 2012
The Gunsmoke crew recreate an 1883 Howdah pistol. Gunsmiths Jon and Doug have a friendly wager — winner presents a Super Bowl champ with his custom rifle. Tempers flare when Kurt announces he wants to leave Gunsmoke to go to engraving school in Italy.
26	"Sturgis S&W; 1898 Krag-Jorgensen"	September 5, 2012
The Gunsmoke crew customize an 1898 Krag-Jorgensen rifle. Rich's motorcycle club brother wants a customized Smith & Wesson 686 Plus for the Sturgis rally. Kurt's disagreement with Rich over whether he can leave for engraving school comes to a head.

== Reception ==
The New York Times reviewed the show in the wake of the 2012 Aurora, Colorado shooting, examining the American fascination with firearms. They described the show as combining the "haggling of Pawn Stars, the over-the-top customizing of American Chopper and a healthy dose of cleavage in a peppy package that resembles a hundred other small-business-based reality shows, except that the business in this case is the sale of deadly weapons". The reviewer notes that although some may be uncomfortable with the easy availability of guns in America, the audience of over 1 million viewers does not seem to have any such qualms.

=== Ratings ===
The season 2 premiere (April 26, 2012) drew strong ratings, up 50% on the season 1 premiere.

== Cancellation and controversy ==
On December 17, 2012, Discovery announced the cancellation of the series. Discovery said the decision had been made earlier, it was only announced in December. A spokesperson said "Discovery Channel chose not to renew the series and has no plans to air repeats of the show." The Sandy Hook Elementary School shooting is thought to have played a part in the decision.

Additionally, in March 2013 Gunsmoke Guns was served a search warrant for the premises by the Internal Revenue Service as "part of an ongoing financial investigation" that had been underway for several years according to an agency spokesperson. This took place shortly after a reported February 27 burglary where twelve handguns and three rifles were stolen by thieves who broke in through the roof of the shop.

There was also speculation in the press that the IRS investigation was the result of Gunsmoke operator Rich Wyatt's remarks regarding pending Colorado legislation regarding gun purchase and ownership.

In the last episode of season one, a man identified later as Wylie Newton attempted to sell an antique Colt pistol that had been stolen from a museum in New Mexico. A fan of the show that was familiar with the robbery recognized the gun and alerted authorities.

On March 10, 2017 a federal jury convicted Rich Wyatt on ten felony counts related to conspiracy, fraud and tax evasion. The jury found that Wyatt had failed to report 1.1 million dollars to the IRS. Furthermore it was revealed Wyatt had negotiated a deal with Discovery Channel when in fact he never did have federal firearms license, though instead used a straw license through Triggers, a gun store in Castle Rock. Wyatt was sentenced to 78 months (6.5 years) in prison.

== Music ==
The opening theme music is “Tallahassee” performed by Swamp Cabbage.

== See also ==
- Sons of Guns
- Guntucky
