= John Fernandes (musician) =

American multi-instrumentalist musician

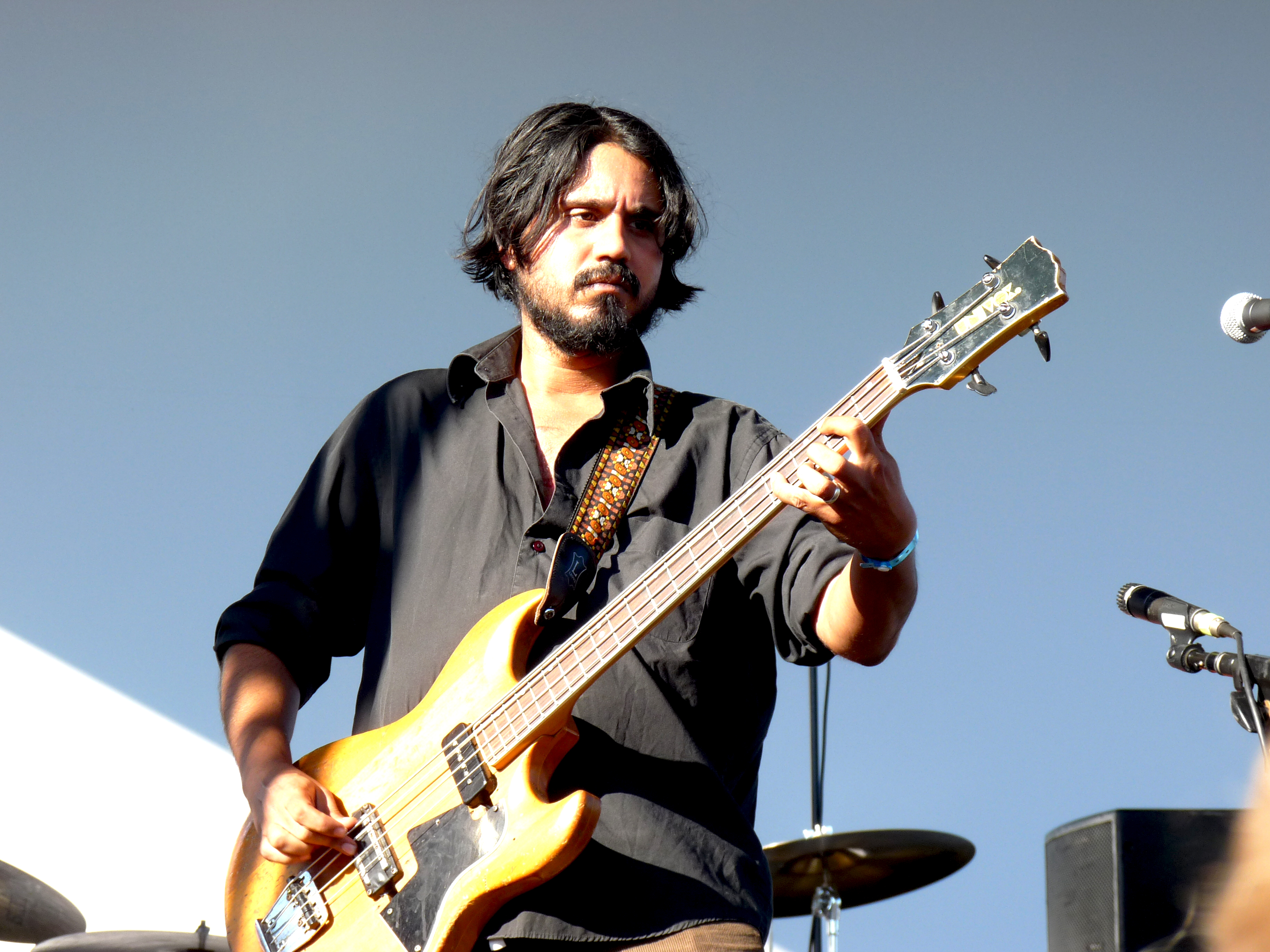
Fernandes playing bass at FYF Fest 2010

John Kiran Fernandes (born November 21, 1975) is an American multi-instrumentalist musician.

== Professional career ==
Fernandes, along with several other members of the Elephant Six Collective, joined the acclaimed psychedelic pop group the Olivia Tremor Control in Athens, Georgia, in 1994. Fernandes was also a member of the side-project Black Swan Network.

Upon that band's demise, Fernandes went on to form the Athens-based group Circulatory System with other members of Olivia Tremor Control, most notably Will Cullen Hart.

In addition, Hart and Fernandes started a record label in 2001 called Cloud Recordings, which issued the Circulatory System's self-titled first album. Fernandes frequently contributes to multiple Athens-based bands' live shows and recordings. He currently plays with Circulatory System, the New Sound of Numbers, Old Smokey, Freehand, Lavender Holyfield, Jacob Morris - Moths, and Dream Boat. He has also performed his own live solo shows, and has performed as part of the Elephant 6 Collective's occasional tours.

He released an album of solo material in February 2011 under the name John Kiran Fernandes. He released a second album of solo material in November 2015. He released a third album of solo material on September 19, 2024.

Fernandes worked at Wuxtry Records in Athens for 23 years, where one of his co-workers was Danger Mouse.

== Discography ==
- Sock the Monkey [cassette] (1994)
- The Olivia Tremor Control – The Giant Day [7-inch] (1996)
- The Olivia Tremor Control – Music from the Unrealized Film Script: Dusk at Cubist Castle [CD/2LP] (1996)
- Black Swan Network – The Late Music Volume One [CD] (1997)
- The Olivia Tremor Control/Black Swan Network [CD/LP] (1997)
- of Montreal – The Bird Who Ate the Rabbit's Flower [CD/LP] (1997)
- Elf Power – When The Red King Comes [CD/LP+7-inch] (1997)
- The Olivia Tremor Control – Jumping Fences [CD/12-inch] (1998)
- The Olivia Tremor Control – Hideaway [CD/12-inch] (1998)
- of Montreal – The Bedside Drama: A Petite Tragedy [CD/LP] (1998)
- The Olivia Tremor Control – Black Foliage: Animation Music Volume One [CD/2LP] (1999)
- of Montreal – The Gay Parade [CD/LP] (1999)
- Calvin, Don't Jump! – Solamente La Luna Esta Noche [7-inch] (1999)
- The Sunshine Fix – Beaconary Word [7-inch] (1999)
- The Olivia Tremor Control – John Peel Session [CD/LP] (2000)
- The Olivia Tremor Control/Kahimi Karie – Once Upon a Time [CD] (2000)
- Black Swan Network [7-inch] (2001)
- Circulatory System – Circulatory System [CD/2LP] (2001)
- Circulatory System – Inside Views [CD] (2001)
- Pipes You See, Pipes You Don't – Individualized Shirts [CD] (2001)
- Major Organ and the Adding Machine – Major Organ and the Adding Machine [CD/LP] (2001)
- A Hawk and A Hacksaw – A Hawk and A Hacksaw [CD/LP] (2002)
- The Instruments – Billions of Phonographs [CD] (2003)
- Circulatory System - "Deserts (As Big As A Star)" [CD] (2003)
- Elf Power – Back to the Web [CD/LP] (2006)
- The Instruments – Cast Half a Shadow [CD] (2006)
- The New Sound of Numbers – Liberty Seeds [CD] (2006)
- The Apples in Stereo – New Magnetic Wonder [CD/LP] (2007)
- Folklore – The Ghost of H.W. Beaverman [CD] (2007)
- Hope for Agoldensummer – Ariadne Thread [CD] (2007)
- The Instruments – Dark Småland [CD] (2008)
- Dark Meat – Universal Indians [CD/LP] (2008)
- The Music Tapes – Music Tapes for Clouds and Tornadoes [CD/LP] (2008)
- Paper Tanks – Trigger Happy/Cocoon [CD] (2009)
- Circulatory System – Signal Morning [CD/LP] (2009)
- Dark Meat – Truce Opium [CD/LP] (2009)
- Madeline – White Flag [CD/LP] (2009)
- Supercluster – Waves [CD] (2009)
- Supercluster – I Got the Answer/Sunflower Clock [7-inch] (2009)
- Whiskey Sunrise – Rêvenant [CD] (2009)
- Circulatory System – Side Three [LP] (2010)
- Ham1 – Let's Go On and On and On [CD/LP] (2010)
- Mouser – Storm Dumps [CD] (2010)
- Spirit Hair – Star Don [CD] (2010)
- Werewolves – Someday We'll Live in the Forest [CD] (2010)
- Elf Power – Elf Power [CD/LP] (2010)
- Various - We Made A Record!!!!!!! What Did You Do?????? Wuxtry Record Store Day Compilation [LP] (2010)
- Secrets in the Stars - Electromagnetism [CD] (2011)
- Supercluster – Paris Effect [7-inch] (2011)
- Marshmallow Coast – Seniors and Juniors Strikes Back [CD] (2011)
- The Elephant Six Orchestra – Welcome to Our Story [7-inch] (2011)
- John Kiran Fernandes – John Kiran Fernandes [CD] (2011)
- Madeline – Black Velvet [CD/LP] (2011)
- Pipes You See, Pipes You Don't – Lost in the Pancakes [CD] (2011)
- The Olivia Tremor Control – "The Game You Play Is In Your Head, Parts 1, 2, & 3" (2011)
- Various - Wuxtry Records Record Store Day Athens Compilation 2011 [LP] (2011)
- The Music Tapes – Mary's Voice [CD/LP] (2012)
- Dream Boat – Eclipsing [CD/LP] (2012)
- Jacob Morris – Moths [CD/LP] (2012)
- Nesey Gallons – When I Was an Ice Skater [CD/LP] (2012)
- Old Smokey – Old Smokey [EP CD/7-inch] (2013)
- Elf Power – Sunlight on the Moon [CD/LP] (2013)
- Jandek – Athens Saturday [2CD/DVD] (2013)
- The New Sound of Numbers – Invisible Magnetic [LP] (2013)
- Old Smokey – Wester Easter [CD/LP] (2014)
- Circulatory System – Mosaics Within Mosaics [CD/2LP/cassette] (2014)
- Dream Boat – The Rose Explodes [CD/LP] (2014)
- Hand Sand Hands – The Shipping Forecast [cassette] (2014)
- Cult of Riggonia – Harry Chanchfield Presents... [LP] (2014)
- Mind Brains – Mind Brains [LP/CD] (2014)
- El Hollín – Una Tuesday [cassette] (2015)
- The Electric Nature – Alienation [cassette] (2015)
- Jo RB Jones – Jo RB Jones [cassette] (2015)
- Alec Livaditis – Clear and Cloud [LP] (2015)
- John Kiran Fernandes – II [cassette] (2015)
- The Midnight Ghost Train - Cold Was The Ground [LP] (2015)
- Aural Oceans - "HarmoniumClarinet" (2016)
- Dave Marr – We Were All In Love [CD] (2016)
- The Taxicab Verses/Kofi Atentenben and the Warriors – Is What You Make It [LP/CD] (2016)
- Jeff Tobias – Some [cassette] (2016)
- John Kiran Fernandes – "Warm" (2016)
- Muuy Biien – Age of Uncertainty [LP/CD] (2016)
- Wistappear - "Our Tornado" (2016)
- Wistappear - Knack For Whatever [CD] (2016)
- Lavender Holyfield – Rabbitboxing Midnightmouth [LP] (2017)
- Philipp Bückle – They Never Got the Message [cassette] (2017)
- Faust – Fresh Air [LP/CD/7-inch] (2017)
- Cindy Wilson – Change [CD/LP] (2017)
- Bed Rugs – Hard Fun Grand Design [2LP/CD/cassette] (2018)
- Old Smokey – Sundowners (2019)
- Sleepy Co. – Kind of Warm for a Lonesome Home (2020)
- Rambutan – Parallel Systems [2CD] (2021)
- The Rishis – "Wake Up" (2021)
- Scotty Lingelbach – Cow Tools (2022)
- The Rishis – August Moon [LP] (2022)
- John Kiran Fernandes & Shane Parish – Improvisations on Clarinets and Steel-String Guitar (2022)
- Shane Parish – "Walk Back Words" (2023)
- The Electric Nature – Old World Die Must [LP] (2023)
- Immaterial Possession – Mercy of the Crane Folk [LP/CD] (2023)
- Jacob Morris – Slow Funeral [LP/CD] (2023)
- Michael Potter & Friends [cassette] (2023)
- Eden Arnold - II [cassette] (2023)
- Patrick Barry - "Alien Song" (2023)
- Eden Arnold, Nesey Gallons, John Kiran Fernandes - Haunted Harmonies & Halloween Dreams [cassette] (2023)
- Sham - Machine Simple [LP/cassette] (2023)
- Eden Arnold & Carousel Museum - Ramoncita Light [CD] (2023)
- Orange Doors - "Tornado" (2024)
- John Kiran Fernandes/Arianna Petersen - Live at Buvez (2024)
- John Kiran Fernandes/Franklin Russell/Arianna Petersen - Flicker (Live) (2024)
- John Kiran Fernandes/Klimchak - Ciné (Live) (2024)
- John Kiran Fernandes/Franklin Russell - Live at Flicker (2024)
- John Kiran Fernandes/Doc Calico - Buvez (Live) (2024)
- John Kiran Fernandes - John Kiran Fernandes & Friends (2024)
- Dhana Jeera - Dhana Jeera [LP/cassette] (2024)
- Various - The Elephant 6 Recording Co. [LP/CD] (2024)
- The John Kiran Fernandes and David McCoy Ambient Duo - "Saturn Pulses" (2025)
- Organically Programmed - Organically Programmed [LP/cassette] (2025)
- Jardin botanique + John Kiran Fernandes - Isthmus [cassette] (2025)
- Telemarket - "Didn't Ask What's On My Mind." (2025)
- Various - Vic Chesnutt Songwriter of the Year Award: Tenth Anniversary Compilation [LP] (2026)
- Black Swan Network - The Early Music: Volume One [LP] (2026)
- Kevin Coleman - K.C. Blues [LP] (2026)
- Stef Chura - Dancing Alone on the Concrete [LP/CD/cassette] (2026)
- The Olivia Tremor Control - The Same Place [2LP/CD] (2026)
