= Laura Camacho =

Argentine-American double bassist, composer, and ethnomusicologist

Background information
- Born: January 6, 1978 (age 48); Buenos Aires, Argentina
- Origin: Buenos Aires, Argentina; Athens, Georgia, United States; Austin, Texas, United States
- Genres: Argentine tango, tango nuevo, classical music, folk
- Occupations: Musician; composer; ethnomusicologist; educator
- Instrument: Double bass
- Years active: 2002–present
- Website: athenstangoproject.com

Laura Camacho (born January 6, 1978) is an Argentine-American double bassist, composer, ethnomusicologist, and educator specializing in Argentine tango music. She is the founder and director of the Orquesta Típica Laura Camacho, identified by Diario El Día as the second tango Orquesta típica in the history of tango to be directed by a woman, after Paquita Bernardo's ensemble in the 1920s, and according to Perfil the first female directed tango orquesta típica in the United States. Based in the United States since the late 2000s, she founded the Athens Tango Project and later the Laura Camacho Tango Project, through which she has collaborated with musicians from the American, Argentine, and international tango scenes.

== Early life and education ==
Laura Camacho was born on January 6, 1978, in Buenos Aires, Argentina, and grew up in the neighborhood of San Telmo. She grew up listening to tango, an influence she has credited to dancing tango with her grandmother in her San Telmo apartment and to seeing Osvaldo Pugliese perform live. She has recalled her grandmother leading her through tango steps in the apartment, teaching her to keep rhythm while a record player provided accompaniment.

Camacho studied double bass performance at the Conservatorio Manuel de Falla in Buenos Aires from 1998 to 2002, earning a degree in double bass performance. Her first double bass instructor was Ricardo Calvo, a member of the Argentine National Symphony Orchestra. She took private lessons with Carlos Vega, another Buenos Aires double bass instructor. She also studied folklorico music with guitarist Juan Falú, music theory with Roque De Pedro, and later took tango double bass classes with Horacio Cabarcos, a Latin Grammy-nominated tango double bassist and composer.

Camacho performed in several Buenos Aires ensembles, recording with the Catupecu Machu rock group on their 2002 DVD release Eso Vive, and with the Ensamble Eramusical on their 2009 orchestral album. She also performed as a member of Las Del Abasto, an all-female Argentine tango ensemble based in Buenos Aires. She also recorded with Rodrigo Vázquez Cuarteto on their 2009 tango album Por Lo Nuestro. As a member of Las Del Abasto she performed as an opener for Mariano Mores and Sexteto Mayor, whose performances she has cited as lasting musical inspirations.

At age 29, Camacho met Milton Masciadri, a Uruguayan-born University Professor of Double Bass at the University of Georgia. Masciadri offered her a scholarship to study at UGA which led to her move to the United States at 31. She studied at the University of Georgia's Franklin College of Arts and Sciences, earning a Bachelor of Music in Music Performance (Double Bass) in 2012, graduating Magna Cum Laude, and a Master of Arts in Music Performance (Double Bass) in 2016.

She is currently pursuing a Ph.D. in Ethnomusicology at the University of Texas at Austin's Butler School of Music, with research focusing on tango music communities and gender in contemporary tango culture. In 2026 she received a research award from the Argentine Studies Program of the Lozano Long Institute of Latin American Studies at the University of Texas at Austin.

== Career ==
=== Athens Tango Project ===
In 2012, Camacho founded the Athens Tango Project in Athens, Georgia, gathering musicians from the local music scene and the University of Georgia's music programs to perform Argentine tango.

The Athens Tango Project won the Flagpole Magazine Athens Music Awards in both 2014 and 2016 in the World Music category. Flagpole Magazine music editor Gabe Vodicka described the group as bringing world music to prominence in Athens and credited them with helping establish a local interest in music from other parts of the world. Pianist Emiliano Messiez noted the ensemble's ability to perform Argentine tango despite its internationally diverse membership, observing that not all non-Argentine musicians master the style.

The group performed at the 2016 Flagpole Athens Music Awards show at the Morton Theatre alongside Mothers, the Pylon Reenactment Society, and other Athens acts, joined by dancers from DanceFX. The group also performed at TEDxUGA in 2016. A feature story on Camacho and the Athens Tango Project by WUGA FM contributing producer Allison Salerno won the Georgia Association of Broadcasters' GABBY Award for Best Feature Story in the Large Market category in 2019.

The group has collaborated with tango artists including Tanghetto and Alejandro Ziegler Tango Quartet. They have also performed tango arrangements of songs by Athens-associated artists including R.E.M., Neutral Milk Hotel, Kishi Bashi, and Pylon, which include performances with original Pylon vocalist Vanessa Briscoe Hay and Pylon Reenactment Society member Jason NeSmith.

In 2019, Athens Tango Project recorded a tango cover of "I Have Been Floated" by The Olivia Tremor Control for the compilation album An Enthusiast's Fanfare for Elephant 6, featuring backing vocals by Will Cullen Hart, a founding member of The Olivia Tremor Control and Circulatory System (band). Flagpole Magazine singled out the track as one of the standout recordings on the compilation.

In January 2023, the Athens Tango Project released its debut EP Para Compartir (To Be Shared), featuring the cover of R.E.M.'s "Drive". The EP was covered by WUGA FM and The Red and Black.

=== Laura Camacho Tango Project ===
Camacho founded the Laura Camacho Tango Project for her work as a composer and bandleader, featuring collaborations with musicians across the United States and Argentina. In November 2025, the project released the album Todo Tiempo Pasado, featuring original compositions by Camacho alongside works by Astor Piazzolla, Mariano Mores, as well as tango arrangements of songs by Britney Spears and Kate Bush. The album features Latin Grammy-nominated composers Emiliano Messiez and Ariel Pirotti and Premios Tango Siglo XXI nominated Japanese bandoneonist Natsuki Nishihara.

Todo Tiempo Pasado received a five-star review from Roots Music Report, which also published an extended interview with Camacho about the album. It was selected as the recommended album of the month by Tango21 for May 2026, with a review originally published in the German tango magazine Tangodanza, which noted the album's jazz-inflected sound and its orientation toward presenting tango as a contemporary art form. The album charted at number 15 on the Spin The Globe Top 15 World Music Albums chart for December 2025 and debuted on the Jazzweek Jazz Chart in May 2026, reaching number 306 as of June 2026.

Todo Tiempo Pasado received international radio airplay, including on CBC Radio's Saturday Night Jazz with Laila Biali, the Mil mundos program on Radio Nacional de España Radio Clásica produced by Mundofonías, NHK FM in Japan, and Resonance FM in London, where DJ Ritu MBE featured the album on A World in London. In the United States the album received airplay on Peter Bochan's syndicated All Mixed Up radio show on WBAI Pacifica Radio in New York, on Transpacific Sound Paradise on WFMU, on Full Moon Hacksaw, a jazz program distributed nationally through Public Radio Exchange, and on Horizontes, KUTX music program. The album was included on the syndicated programs, Modern Jazz Today , Jazz Happening Now , and Jazz After Hours. Camacho also appeared live in studio for a special edition of The Geography of Sound on KOOP (FM) and was featured as a guest on El Arranque and Talento con T de Tango, two programs on La 2x4 FM 92.7, part of the es:Radio de la Ciudad radio network and the official tango radio station of the City of Buenos Aires. Laura Camacho was featured in a 21 minute interview broadcast on Uruguayan public radio station Babel (radio station), discussing the album. Camacho was also interviewed on the Contrabass Conversations podcast and featured on The Jazz Disturbance podcast on All About Jazz.

=== Orquesta Típica Laura Camacho ===
In Austin, Camacho directs the Orquesta Típica Laura Camacho, a tango ensemble that made its documented public debut at Esquina Passion, a pre-festival milonga at Esquina Tango in Austin, on March 19, 2026. Diario El Día identified the ensemble as the second orquesta típica in the history of tango to be directed by a woman, after Paquita Bernardo's Orquesta Paquita in the 1920s, and the first in the United States. Argentine press coverage in 2026 described her as a pivotal figure in contemporary tango in the United States.

In an interview with Otra Canción, Camacho discussed the historical connection between her orchestra and Bernardo. She described her own orchestra as a continuation of Bernardo's precedent after nearly a century, noting that Bernardo passed away in 1925. Camacho said she is proud of the orchestra but wishes that a century hadn't passed between the two orchestras. She described the orchestra's foundation as a precedent for future generations of women in tango.

Camacho discussed the gender dynamics of tango leadership, and described opposition she encountered as a woman directing a tango orquesta típica. She has noted that women have increasingly taken on roles as musicians, composers, and organizers while positions of authority in traditional tango orchestras have remained predominatly male. She described the inbanace as reflecting a persistence of patriarchal structures and said that establishing her position as orchestra director was a form of activism.

Camacho has also described her practice of conducting the ensemble through movement and dance as an innovation in the genre's performance tradition, providing musicians with physical cues about tango rhythm. The ensemble also functions as an orchestra school, with students performing independently for tango events in other cities.

=== Touring and Collaborations ===
Camacho has performed as a bassist with tango ensembles across the United States. She has collaborated with composer Emiliano Messiez, bandoneonist Horacio Romo, director of Sexteto Mayor, and Pablo Agri, violin, Tanghetto, as well as Pablo Estigarribia, and Julián Peralta. Camacho also formed a modal jazz and folk trio with John Fernandes, founding member of The Olivia Tremor Control and Circulatory System.

In May 2024, Camacho performed as a featured artist at the CU Tango Music Festival in Champaign-Urbana, Illinois. The festival concert featured her as one of several composers performing their own work, alongside Julián Peralta. In July 2024, she performed with Julián Peralta's quintet at the "Tango de Hoy" intensive at the Philadelphia Argentine Tango School. In summer 2025 she toured across multiple US cities with Julián Peralta.

=== Theater and multimedia ===
Camacho composed "Kaolin Cha Cha" for the documentary film Eat White Dirt, which premiered on January 5, 2017, on REEL SOUTH / PBS.

Camacho composed the original score for The Serpents Fly at Sundown, an outdoor lantern puppetry performance about environmental justice, created in collaboration with Glass Half Full Theatre of Austin. The work received an inaugural Artistic Citizenship Collaborative Creative Project Grant from the UT Austin College of Fine Arts and premiered at the Cohen New Works Festival at the University of Texas at Austin on April 7, 9, and 10, 2025, and is part of an ongoing production by Glass Half Full Theatre.

At the 2025 Cohen New Works Festival, Camacho co-led Emiliana: A Revolution Cabaret, a play with music presented at the B. Iden Payne Theatre at UT Austin on April 8–10, 2025.

In October 2026, Camacho composed the music for Close Embrace: A Participatory Memoir Play, written and directed by Irene Zhiyi Chen, presented at the Lab Theatre at the University of Texas at Austin.

=== Teaching and lectures ===
Camacho has taught double bass and tango to musicians at multiple levels. In Buenos Aires she taught double bass at youth orchestras affiliated with El Sistema, an international music education program, from 2008 to 2009.

She has taught music at the Rollins Child Development Center in Athens from 2017 to 2019. She also led a free tango music workshop for strings and bass at the Community Center for the Arts during the CU Tango festival and has coached bassists at the Tanguero Workshop led by Julián Peralta. She has also given guest lectures on tango music at the University of Georgia, Georgia Tech, Texas Tech University, and the University of Illinois.

In November 2024, she participated in the concluding roundtable of the Tango in the Humanities Conference at Emory University, an academic conference affiliated with the Cambridge Companion to Tango and supported by the National Endowment for the Humanities.

She also participated as a community music producer in the "Local Producers Roundtable" at the Musicking Communities & Labor symposium organized by the Musicology/Ethnomusicology division of the Butler School of Music, held February 14–15, 2026.

In the United States she has served as an instructor and guest conductor of Mariachi Ensemble at the University of Texas at Austin, for which she composed two original works in 2025 — "Unas Notas Para Utlán" and "Divide" — both described as Tango Contemporaneo and performed by the Butler School of Music's Mariachi Utlán ensemble.

== Discography ==
=== As Laura Camacho Tango Project ===
- Todo Tiempo Pasado (2025) — Athens Tango Project label; charted #15 on Spin The Globe Top 15 World Music Albums, December 2025; debuted on Jazzweek Jazz Chart May 2026

=== As Athens Tango Project ===
- Oblivion (single, 2020)
- ECOS (single, with Adiós Nonino, 2022/2024)
- Para Compartir (EP, 2023) — Athens Tango Project label

=== As co-composer (The Broken String Band) ===
- The Culprit & the Stage — The Broken String Band (2019) — co-composer
- Lady Casanova — The Broken String Band (single, 2019) — co-composer
- Family & Friends — The Broken String Band (single, 2019) — co-composer

=== As composer (theater and multimedia) ===
- Eat White Dirt — documentary film, PBS/REEL SOUTH (2017) — composer (shared credit)
- Athens Rising: The Sicyon Project: Volume One — documentary film (2018) — composer: "De La Tierra"; "Tango Libelula" (co-written with Jay Gonzalez of Drive-By Truckers); performer
- The Serpents Fly at Sundown — Glass Half Full Theatre / Cohen New Works Festival, UT Austin (2025, ongoing) — composer (original score)
- Emiliana: A Revolution Cabaret — Cohen New Works Festival, UT Austin (2025) — composer and co-project lead
- Close Embrace: A Participatory Memoir Play — Lab Theatre, Department of Theatre and Dance, UT Austin (2026) — composer (original music)

=== As composer (Mariachi) ===
- "Unas Notas Para Utlán" (Tango Contemporaneo, 2025) — performed by Mariachi Utlán, Butler School of Music, UT Austin
- "Divide" (Tango Contemporaneo, 2025) — performed by Mariachi Utlán, Butler School of Music, UT Austin

=== Compilations and other appearances ===
- Eso Vive — Catupecu Machu (DVD, 2002)
- Bride — Layma Azur (2005)
- Por Lo Nuestro — Rodrigo Vázquez Cuarteto (2009)
- EEM Ensamble Eramusical (2009)
- Street Song — University of Georgia Wind Ensemble, conducted by John P. Lynch (Naxos 8.572917, 2012)
- Ibis, Vol. I — (2018, jazz album)
- "I Have Been Floated" (cover of The Olivia Tremor Control) — An Enthusiast's Fanfare for Elephant 6, E6 Enthusiasts (2019), featuring Will Cullen Hart
- Miguel del Aguila: Orchestral Works — Augusta Symphony (Albany Records, 2022)

== See also ==
- Athens Tango Project
- Argentine tango
- Astor Piazzolla
- Paquita Bernardo
- Juan Falú
