= Supercluster (band) =

- Origin: Athens, Georgia
- Genres: Experimental rock, folk rock, dream pop, psychedelic rock
- Years active: 2007 - present
- Labels: Cloud, Studio Mouse Productions
- Website: www.superclusterband.com

Supercluster is a recording project that formed during 2007 in Athens, Georgia. It includes musicians from the Athens bands New Sound Of Numbers, Bob Hay & the Jolly Beggars, Casper & the Cookies, of Montreal, Circulatory System and Pylon, along with Elephant 6 recording artist John Fernandes. Members presently include Hannah M. Jones, Bob Hay, Bill David, Kay Stanton, Bryan Poole, Vanessa Briscoe Hay, Jason NeSmith and John Fernandes. Alumni include Randy Bewley (deceased), Heather McIntosh, Will Cullen Hart and Peter Erchick. Supercluster play what they term "Appalachian Wave." For a brief period they were known as FFFM.

On February 23, 2009, Randy Bewley was driving on Barber Street in Athens when he suffered a heart attack. According to the band Pylon's statement, his van drifted off the road and overturned. He was admitted to Athens Regional Medical Center and lapsed into a coma; he died two days later on February 25 when he was removed from life support.

Bradford Cox from the group Deerhunter came into Bel*Air studio and helped Supercluster finish the last couple of tracks that needed to be recorded for Waves which was released October 6, 2009 on Cloud Recordings. Live performance guitar duties are now handled by Jason NeSmith and Bryan Poole. Supercluster have continued to record singles since this release and perform locally in Athens, Georgia. They plan on releasing a full length project at some point composed of these singles.

== Discography ==
=== Singles ===
- "I Got The Answer/Sunflower Clock" – 7-inch limited-edition single (2009), Cloud Recordings/ Studio Mouse Productions
- "Paris Effect/Neat in the Street" – 7-inch limited-edition single (2011), Cloud Recordings/Studio Mouse Productions
- "Things We Used To Drink/Memory Of The Future" – 7-inch limited-edition single (2012), Studio Mouse Productions

=== Albums and EPs ===
- Special 5 e.p. (2007)
- Waves CD (2009), Cloud Recordings/Studio Mouse Productions

=== Video ===
- Too Many Eights (2007), Supercluster, from CDR EP: Special 5
- I Got the Answer (2009), Supercluster, from: CD Waves, Studio Mouse Productions/Cloud Recordings
- Neat In The Street (2011), Supercluster, from: single Paris Effect/Neat In The Street, Studio Mouse Productions/Cloud Recordings. Written by The Side Effects (Butchart/Ellison/Swartz), 1980.
- Memory Of The Future (2012), Supercluster, from: single Things We Used To Drink/Memory Of The Future, Studio Mouse Productions. Directed by Hana Hay and Hannah Jones from artwork by Hannah Jones.
