= Calvin, Don't Jump! =

- Genres: Folk, psychedelic, indie
- Years active: 1999–present
- Labels: Happy Happy Birthday to Me, Perhaps Transparent, Norman, Royal Rhino Flying
- Members: J. Kirk Pleasant; Nathan Matthews; Lee-Ann Sheel; Shinobu Hata

Calvin, Don't Jump! started as the solo recording project of J. Kirk Pleasant, a musician with extensive connections to the Elephant 6 Collective. Before moving to Vancouver, British Columbia, Canada, he contributed to releases from bands like the Olivia Tremor Control, Black Swan Network, and Pipes You See, Pipes You Don't. His own albums have featured contributions from musicians like Scott Spillane (Neutral Milk Hotel, the Gerbils), Jeremy Barnes (Neutral Milk Hotel, A Hawk and a Hacksaw), John D'Azzo (the Gerbils), as well as Peter Erchick, Eric Harris, and John Fernandes (all of the Olivia Tremor Control).

Early in 2007, Pleasant announced that what had begun as a solo project would expand into a four-piece band, geared towards a poppier, more guitar driven sound. The band featured Pleasant (vocals and guitar), Nathan Matthews (bass), Lee-Ann Sheel (drums), and Shinobu Hata (keyboards).

Calvin, Don't Jump! released two full-length albums, as well as four 7-inch singles, a CDR of live recordings, and a cassette EP: Notes from Undersound. Pleasant's album Conscious of Conscience (2006) was his first true solo full-length album, drawing on assistance from no outside collaborators.

The band performed three concerts in 2010 and 2011 but appears to have broken up after that; its last social media post was in 2015.

== Discography ==
=== Full-length albums ===
- Crystal Clear Mississippi (1999, self-released)
- A Way With Birds (2002, Happy Happy Birthday To Me Records)
- Conscious of Conscience (2006, self-released)
- Under Bridges (2010, self-released)

=== Live albums ===
- Live on WFMU (Perhaps Transparent Records)

=== Singles ===
- Calvin, Don't Jump!/Echo Orbiter Split (2000, Perhaps Transparent Records) 7"
- Calvin, Don't Jump!/Ooss (2000, Norman Records) 7"
- Rusty Gondola/The Bleating (2000, Happy Happy Birthday To Me Records) 7"
- Crumble/Solamente La Euna Este Noche (Self-Released) 7"

=== EPs ===
- Notes From Undersound (1996, self-released)

=== Compilations ===
- U.S. Pop Life Volume 5 (2000, Contact Records) CD
- Winter Report (2001, Hype City) CD
- Hey, It's My Birthday! (2001, Happy Happy Birthday To Me) Cassette
- Build Your Army With Potatoes (2008, Royal Rhino Flying Records) CD

=== Contributed to ===
- Black Foliage: Animation Music Volume 1 (1999, Flydaddy Records) CD/2x12"
- Individualized Shirts (2001, Cloud Recordings and Orange Twin Records) CD

== See also ==
- Music of Canada
- Music of Vancouver
- Canadian rock
- List of Canadian musicians
- List of bands from Canada
- List of bands from British Columbia
- Category:Canadian musical groups
