= Say It In Slang =

Studio album by Marshmallow Coast
- Released: October 24, 2006
- Genre: pop Rock Indie Rock Indie pop
- Length: 42:05
- Label: Happy Happy Birthday To Me Records

Marshmallow Coast chronology
AntiStar (Album) (2003)	Say It In Slang (2006)	Phreak Phantasy (2009)

Say It In Slang is the sixth studio album by Marshmallow Coast.

== Track listing ==
All tracks are written by Andy Gonzales except where noted.

No.	Title	Length
1.	"Sailing Around The World"	02:57
2.	"Out Of The Water" (Derek Almstead)	02:02
3.	"One Fine Day"	03:42
4.	"I Believe In Love"	04:14
5.	"Order Can Be..." (Derek Almstead)	01:38
6.	"Aurora"	03:20
7.	"Communication Letdown" (Derek Almstead)	02:55
8.	"Electric Bass"	01:53
9.	"Feel Like"	03:33
10.	"Got 2 Get 2 U"	03:47
11.	"Where Stars Go" (Derek Almstead)	02:52
12.	"Seven Seas"	02:39
13.	"Johnny Kasai"	02:39
14.	"Thinking Of Illusions" (Derek Almstead)	02:43
15.	"Ideas And Integrities" (Derek Almstead)	03:11
Total length:		42:05

== Personnel ==
- Andy Gonzales - Song Writing, Guitar, Keyboards, Vocals
- Derek Almstead - Bass, Drums, Vocals
- Heather McIntosh - Cello
- Bill Oglesby - Saxophone
- Andrew Heaton - Violin
- Emily Growden - Vocals
