= Circulatory System (album) =

Studio album by Circulatory System
- Released: August 28, 2001
- Genres: Indie rock, psychedelic rock
- Length: 57:08
- Label: Cloud

Circulatory System chronology
Circulatory System (2001)	Inside Views (2001)

Circulatory System is the first album by the American music ensemble Circulatory System. It was released on August 28, 2001, on musician John Fernandes' Cloud Recordings label.

The album artwork is a juxtaposition of the album covers for Music from the Unrealized Film Script: Dusk at Cubist Castle and Black Foliage: Animation Music Volume One by Elephant 6 act the Olivia Tremor Control, who shared members with Circulatory System.

== Critical reception ==
Professional ratings
Aggregate scores
Source	Rating
Metacritic	77/100
Review scores
Source	Rating
AllMusic	2.5/5 stars
Alternative Press	7/10
Pitchfork	9.5/10
Q	4/5 stars
Stylus Magazine	B
Uncut	3/5 stars

Pitchfork named Circulatory System the fifth best album of 2001.

== Track listing ==
All tracks are written by Will Cullen Hart.

No.	Title	Length
1.	"Yesterday's World"	4:00
2.	"Prehistoric"	1:21
3.	"Diary of Wood"	2:17
4.	"Outside Blasts"	6:07
5.	"Joy"	2:06
6.	"The Lovely Universe"	3:24
7.	"Round"	1:07
8.	"Inside Blasts"	5:54
9.	"Illusion"	1:57
10.	"Waves of Bark and Light"	3:00
11.	"Now"	2:07
12.	"A Peek"	3:12
13.	"Fingers"	1:04
14.	"Days to Come (In Photographs)"	2:42
15.	"Symbols and Maps"	2:24
16.	"The Pillow"	2:58
17.	"Stars"	1:55
18.	"Should a Cloud Replace a Compass?"	2:14
19.	"Time or Dateline"	1:11
20.	"How Long?"	2:00
21.	"Your Parades"	3:27
22.	"Forever"	1:26
Total length:		57:08

== Personnel ==
Circulatory System

- Will Cullen Hart – vocals, guitar, bells, drums, percussion, electronics, etc.
- John Fernandes – clarinet (1, 3, 4, 6–10), backing vocals (1, 8, 10, 15, 21, 22), bass guitar (4, 8), chanting (4), violin (8, 10, 12, 20, 21)
- Eric Harris – backing vocals (1, 8, 10, 21), drums (3, 4, 8, 10, 14, 15, 21), organ (3, 21), melodica (4), bass (5)
- Peter Erchick – organ (1, 6, 8, 12), backing vocals (1, 4, 8, 15, 21, 22), bass guitar (10, 15), ukelele (16)
- Jeff Mangum – drums (1, 6, 12), backing vocals (1, 8, 10, 15, 21, 22), shortwave (6), vocals (20)
- Heather McIntosh – cello (1, 3, 8, 11, 12, 21), backing vocals (1, 4)
- Hannah M. Jones – backing vocals (1), vocals (10, 20)

Additional musicians

- Julian Koster – drums (1, 12, 15), bass guitar (1, 12, 15), backing vocals (1, 15, 22)
- Barbara Denvir – backing vocals (1, 8, 21)
- Laura Glenn – backing vocals (1, 10, 21)
- Ravi Fernandes – backing vocals (1)
- Sophie Fernandes – backing vocals (1)
- Darrin Cook – double bass (3, 4, 7, 18)
- Todd Welch – saxophone (4), trumpet (12)
- Steven Trimmer – mandolin (5), balalaika (8)
- Chris Bishop – toy piano (6), bass (9, 14, 17, 19, 20), tambourine (14, 18)
- Scott Spillane – brass (8)
- Christina Hogan – oboe (8), backing vocals (10, 21)
- Laura Carter – backing vocals (8)
- Jeremy Barnes – drums (9)
- Andrew Rieger – slide guitar (14)
- Robbee Cucchiaro – brass (14)
- Mike Schwalke – organ (16)
- Brandon Robertson – bass (21)
- Raleigh Hatfield – organ (21)

Production

- Chris Bishop – recording, bird recordings
- Jeff Mangum – bird recordings
- Peter Erlick – bird recordings
- Glenn Schick – mastering
- Will Cullen Hart – artwork, painting
