= Circulatory system (disambiguation) =

Circulatory system is an organ system for circulating blood in animals.

It may also refer to:

- Vascular tissue, a part of plants
- Circulatory System (band), a music group
  - Circulatory System (album), a music album by the same group
