= Athens Tango Project =

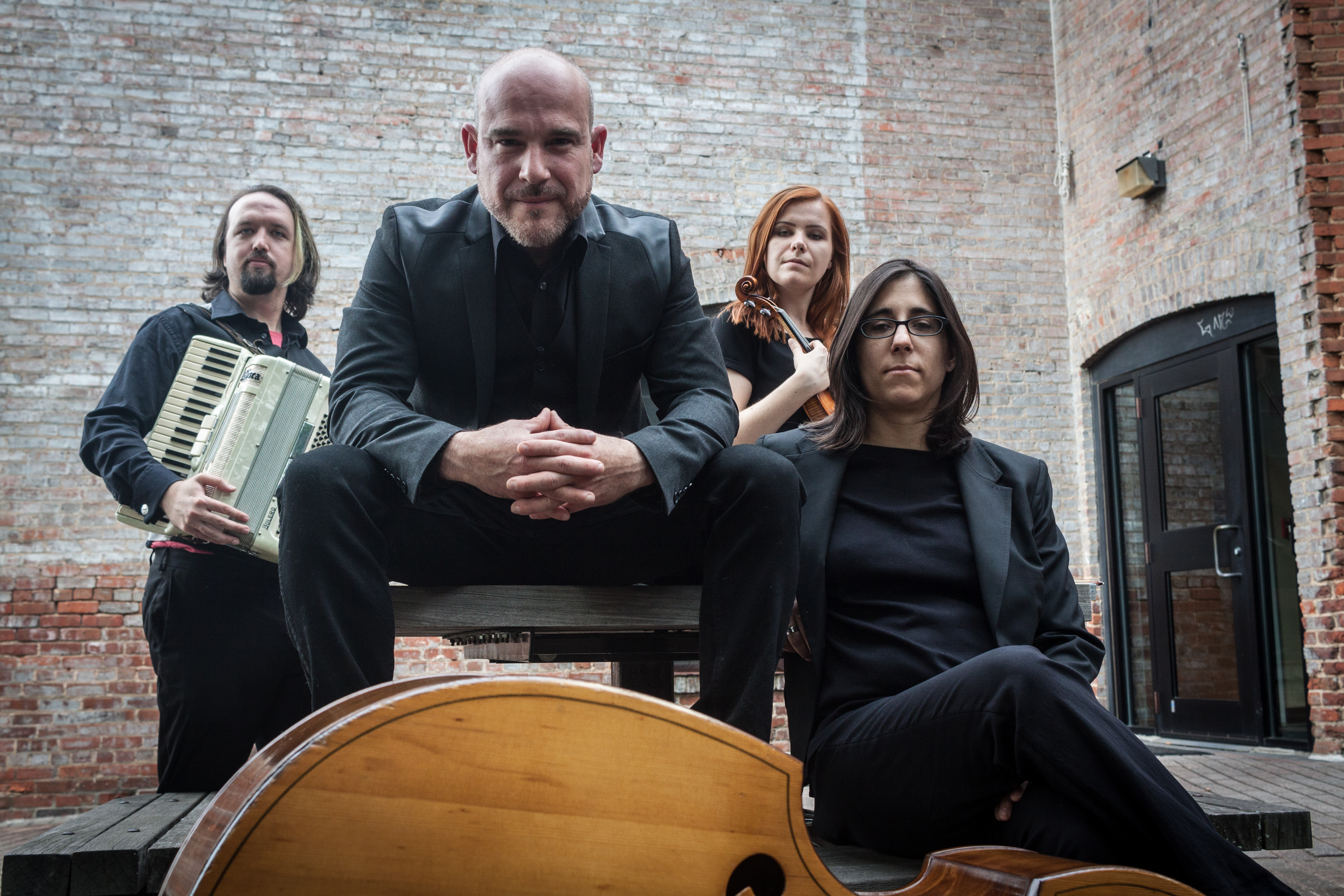
- Athens Tango Project photo by Noah Johnson

Background information
- Origin: Athens, Georgia, United States
- Genres: Tango, Argentine Tango, milonga
- Years active: 2012–present
- Members: Laura Camacho; John Cooper; David Marcus; Monique Osorio; John Phillips; Matt Vu
- Website: Official website

Athens Tango Project is an Argentine tango music band founded in 2012 in the city of Athens, Georgia by Laura Camacho, a Double bass musician from Buenos Aires, featuring Monique Osorio on vocals, John Phillips on drums, John Cooper on violin, and Matt M Vu, David Marcus, on piano. The extended lineup includes Keiko Ishibashi, Franziska Brunner, Teresa Grynia, Curran Pendergrast, Bill Oglesby, Daniel Allen, James Perkins, Jaime Antonio Cardenas Espana, Serena Scibelli, Fernando Deddos, and Ricardo Hurtado.

== History ==
The group has been a prominent member of the Latin music community of Athens and has won several awards for best Jazz and World music group, winning the local Flagpole Magazine Athens Music Awards in 2014 and 2016 as well as performed on the local TedxUGA program. The group's members have collaborated with musicians from tango including David Alsina, Las Del Abasto, Mariano Mores, Sexteto Mayor, Tanghetto, Alejandro Ziegler Tango Quartet as well as music from different genres including Béla Fleck, Ben Folds, Catupecu Machu, CeeLo Green, Deerhunter, members of Drive-By Truckers, members of The Olivia Tremor Control and Circulatory System (band), Herbie Hancock, Diana Krall, Layma Azur, Matisyahu, Christian McBride, and Universal Sigh.

The group has also appeared in documentary films, which include the upcoming Athens, Georgia: 30 Years On (sequel to Athens, GA: Inside/Out) and Athens Rising: The Sicyon Project: Volume One. The group contributed cover songs of Neutral Milk Hotel and R.E.M., as well as a collaboration with Jay Gonzalez of Drive-By Truckers to the documentaries.

Recently, the band has performed renditions of local Athens music by Kishi Bashi, Neutral Milk Hotel, Olivia Tremor Control, Pylon (band), and R.E.M. as live performances while working with Vanessa Briscoe Hay and Jason NeSmith of Pylon Reenactment Society. The group recorded a cover of Olivia Tremor Control's song, I Have Been Floated, with backup vocals from Will Cullen Hart from the compilation album release, An Enthusiast's Fanfare for Elephant 6. Athens Tango Project members played with members of Tanghetto onstage for the Astor Piazzolla piece, Libertango, at the 2019 Argentina Food Wine and Culture Festival.
