= Bob Hay (musician) =

American singer and songwriter

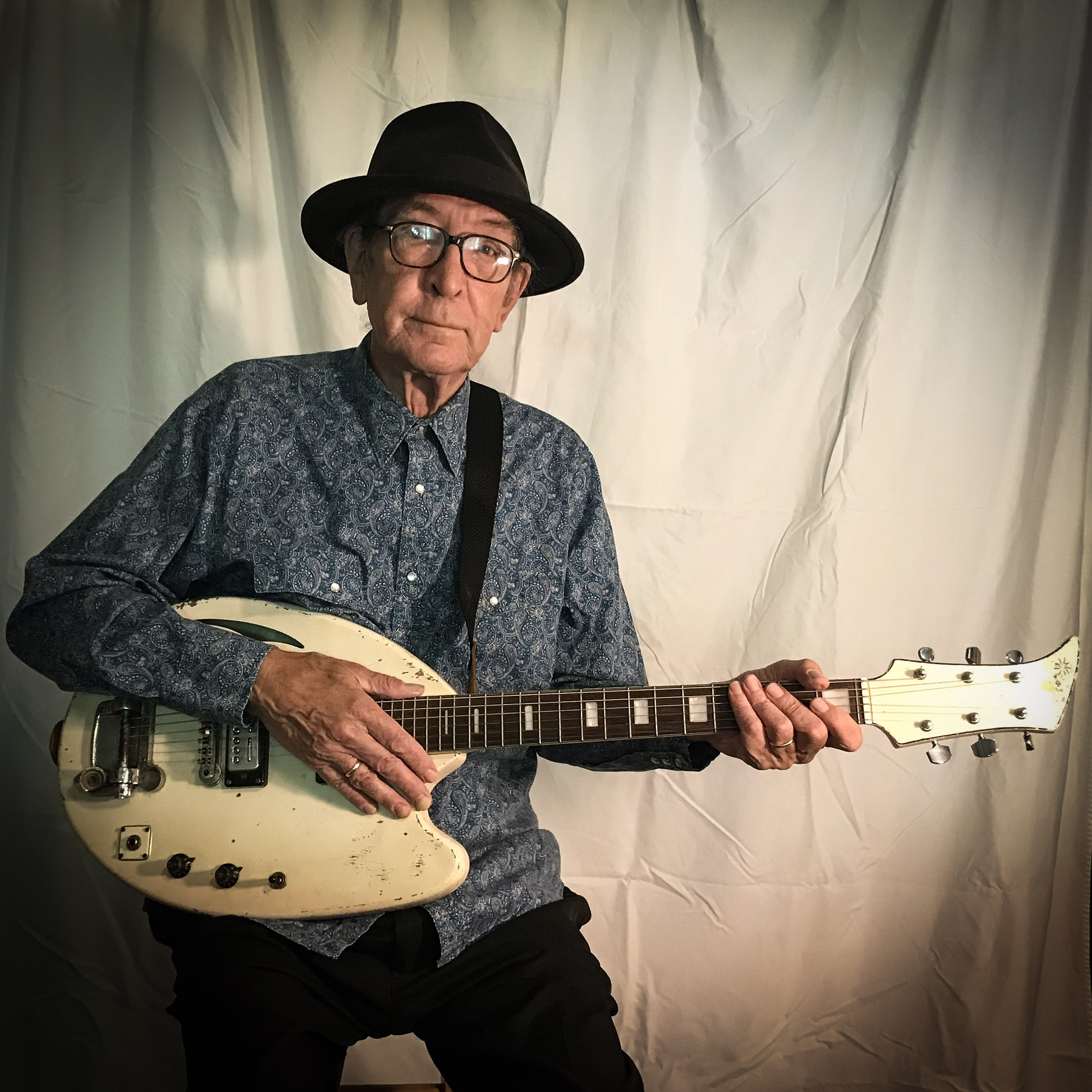
- Bob Hay (musician) 2022.

Background information
- Also known as: A.Che Why
- Born: Robert Donald Hay, Jr; January 28, 1950 (age 76)
- Genres: New wave, folk rock, Beats producer, rock, country rock, old-time
- Occupations: Musician, Songwriter
- Instruments: Guitar; Vocals; Percussion; Harmonica; Banjo; Pennywhistle; Beats producer
- Years active: 1978–present
- Labels: Mbrella; Dog Gone Records; Cloud Recordings; Studio Mouse Productions; Strolling Bones Records; Propeller Sound Recordings

Bob Hay born Robert Donald Hay, Jr. on January 28, 1950, is an American songwriter and the multi-instrumentalist and vocalist for Athens, Georgia projects the Squalls, Bob Hay & the Jolly Beggars, Noogeez, A. Che Why and Supercluster.

== Biography ==
Hay was born on January 28, 1950, in Grand Rapids, Michigan to a postal worker and housewife. He attended Aquinas College (Grand Rapids) and worked as a school teacher and as a statistician prior to moving to Kennebunkport, Maine.

=== As musician ===
Hay was convinced by Ken Starratt to move to Athens, Georgia, from Maine after making a trip to Athens in the late 1970s and surveying the blossoming music scene. Bob met other local musicians including roommate "Big" Al Walsh, Mig Little and Diana Torell and formed the band Squalls. They were well known for switching instruments and singing duties during their shows. Their music was characterized as taking "a more straightforwardly melodic approach to guitar pop than some of their peers in the scene." In 1986, they were featured in the movie Athens, GA: Inside Out. Squalls underwent various lineup changes after Mig Little left the band. They were joined by Mark Cooper Smith, Juan Molina, Paul Hammond and others at various times during their career. Squalls made a self-released e.p. and single, as well as two albums for Dog Gone It Records-a label owned by Jefferson Holt, the manager for R.E.M. Squalls made several trips up and down the East coast of the U.S. and a trip through the mid-West before disbanding. They performed at the 40 Watt Club an astounding 64 times in their heyday.

Hay never stopped jamming with his friends and briefly performed with a project called the Yams who learned covers of songs in hopes of playing bars and fraternity parties. This is where he began his association with multi-instrumentalist Bill David, a local musician with deep roots in the community.

Bob Hay & the Jolly Beggars began as a solo project. Hay became fascinated with the works of Robert Burns, the 18th century Scottish bard, after a random comment which was made during a jam session. He found songs by Robert Burns at the University of Georgia library and began to learn and arrange them. Other former members of Squalls became interested and joined. They have released 3 CDs and perform sporadically in and around Athens, Georgia.

Noogeez was dreamed up by Ken Starratt as a way to use Bob's older Squalls material in a kid-friendly format. 2 videos have been made so far using this material. Members of this band include Ken and Jorma Starratt, Ken's son. Their first video, "Kathy", won the audience choice award during the 2007 Athfest Sprockets competition.

Hay married Vanessa Briscoe, the lead singer for Pylon in 1986 and they have two daughters. She recruited him to play acoustic guitar in her recording project Supercluster. They self released an e.p. "Special 5" in December 2007 and released a full length work called Waves on Cloud Recordings in October 2009.

== Discography ==
Squalls

- Squalls EP (Mbrella, 1984)
- Crickets b/w Bride of Frankenstein single (Mbrella, 1985)
- Athens, Georgia Inside/Out LP (compilation, 2 songs, IRS, 1986)
- Crazy Hazy Kisses Flat Duo Jets b/w Na Nanana Squalls single (IRS-53409 1987)
- Rebel Shoes LP (Dog Gone It 1987)
- No Time LP (Dog Gone It 1988)
- Squalls Live From The 40 Watt LP, CD (compilation of 24 live recordings from 4 shows at the 40 Watt Club) Strolling Bones Records (SB 4, 2022)
- SquallsLP, CD(1984 EP, plus 1985 single, plus unreleased demos) Propeller Sound Recordings (PSR-006, 2022)

Bob Hay & the Jolly Beggars

- Toils Obscure CD (self-released 2004)
- Tam Lin CD (self-released 2006)
- Athfest 2005 CD (compilation of various Athens, GA artists, Ghostmeat, 2005)
- Bawdy Noise CD (self-released 2009)

A. Che Why

- Various tracks Digital (self-released 2006-2008

Supercluster

- Special 5 e.p. CD (self-released 2007)
- Waves CD Cloud Recordings (CLD-012 2009)
- I Got The Answer b/w Sunflower Clock Single Cloud Recordings (CLD-013 2009)
- Paris Effect b/w Neat In The Street Single Cloud Recordings (CLD-014 2011)
- Things We Used To Drink b/w Memory Of The Future Single Studio Mouse Productions (SMP-004 2012)
