= Side 3 (Circulatory System album) =

Compilation album by Circulatory System
- Released: 2010
- Genre: Psychedelic rock
- Length: 34:36
- Label: Cloud

Circulatory System chronology
Signal Morning (2009)	Side 3 (2010)	Mosaics within Mosaics (2014)

Side 3 (2010) is a compilation album by Circulatory System that accompanied their 2009 release Signal Morning. The limited release 12" album includes remixes, demos and alternate-takes, and came with the deluxe edition of Signal Morning.

The covers for the album were handmade and individually stencil spray-painted with the number 3, on top of the original Signal Morning album cover. The inlay has the words "Circulatory System" stenciled. It was released in various colors and variations of layout, designed by Will Cullen Hart.

== Track listing ==
All tracks composed by Will Cullen Hart. All tracks were edited and mastered by the recording artist Derek Almstead.

=== Side A ===
1. "Overjoyed (Alternate Version)" - 4:21
2. "The Frozen Lake/The Symmetry (Alternate Version)" - 4:39
3. "Round Again (Demos)" - 5:25
4. "Until Moon Medium Hears the Message (Demos/Live)" - 4:16

=== Side B ===
1. "Particle Parades (Demos)" - 3:06
2. "This Morning (We Remembered Everything) (Alternate Version)" - 2:59
3. "Rocks and Stones (Alternate Version)" - 5:23
4. "Tiny Concerts (Demo)" - 4:30
