= Ride the Lightning (Marshmallow Coast album) =

Studio album by Marshmallow Coast
- Released: 2001
- Recorded: 2001
- Genre: Indie rock; indie pop
- Length: 46:49
- Label: Misra
- Producer: Andy Gonzales

Marshmallow Coast chronology
Marshmallow Coasting (2000)	Ride the Lightning (2001)	AntiStar (2003)

Professional ratings
Review scores
Source	Rating
AllMusic	4/5 stars

Ride the Lightning is the fourth album by Elephant Six band Marshmallow Coast. It is written by Andy Gonzales and features members of Of Montreal as the backing band.

== Track listing ==
No.	Title	Length
1.	"Classifieds"	3:48
2.	"Ghost with Wisdom"	4:37
3.	"Darkside of the Moon"	3:30
4.	"Piano Bit"	1:08
5.	"Oblivion"	4:44
6.	"Chameleon"	3:12
7.	"Piano Bit"	0:20
8.	"Haunted Blvds"	3:08
9.	"So-and-So's with Emeralds in the Sky"	3:03
10.	"A Pear, De Lune"	2:11
11.	"Dee et Moi"	2:38
12.	"Guitar Suite for Little Debbie"	5:46
13.	"Piano Bit"	1:05
14.	"Jebodiah's Restraints"	2:51
15.	"Would It Be Nice?"	4:47
Total length:		46:49

== Personnel ==
- Derek Almstead – bass, bongos, engineer, keyboards, mastering, mixing, percussion, producer, vibraphone, vocal harmony, vocals
- Dottie – piano, vocals
- Andy Gonzales – banjo, composer, design, guitar, keyboards, layout design, melodica, piano, electric piano, producer, vocals
- Eric Harris – drums, theremin
- Jamie Huggins – drums, percussion
- Kelly Ruberto – design, layout design
