= Antistar =

Antistar may refer to:

- "Antistar", a song on the 100th Window studio album from the music group Massive Attack
- Antistar, an orientation diametrically opposite the direction of a star sometimes used when describing the direction of a comet's tail
- Louise Brooks: Portrait of an Anti-star, a 1977 book about actress Louise Brooks
- AntiStar (album), a 2003 album by Marshmallow Coast
- Nordend Antistars, a group featuring singer Stephan Weidner
- "Anti-star", a nickname of musician, singer, composer, and film-maker Kevin Coyne
- Anti-StAR, an antibody for the steroidogenic acute regulatory protein (StAR)
- Anti-star, a conjectured type of star formed from antimatter
