= Timesquare (album) =

Studio album by Marshmallow Coast
- Released: 2000
- Genre: Indie Pop Indie Rock
- Length: 45:11
- Label: Spare Me Records

Marshmallow Coast chronology
Seniors & Juniors (1999)	Timesquare (2000)	Marshmallow Coasting (2000)

Timesquare is the second studio album by Marshmallow Coast, released in 2000.

== Track listing ==
No.	Title	Length
1.	"Intro"	00:40
2.	"In the Army Kid"	02:36
3.	"Spencer for Hire = Expensive"	02:59
4.	"Cosmolac"	02:53
5.	"Crooked Dance"	01:36
6.	"Bermuda Rectangle"	04:04
7.	"I Love Satie"	04:08
8.	"Hell Tingles"	02:58
9.	"Wedding In Catland"	02:57
10.	"Between Love and Puke On the Bus"	01:36
11.	"Time to Go to Work"	00:18
12.	"Curly Whisper (Bonus Track)"	04:00
13.	"Darker Side of Lightning (Bonus Track)"	01:43
14.	"Instrumental (Bonus Track)"	01:13
15.	"Ceilings Fall a Lot (Bonus Track)"	04:10
16.	"I Hope You Like Rocking (Bonus Track)"	00:45
17.	"Shimmering In a Bulb of Glass 98" (Bonus Track)"	02:22
18.	"Squinting Out the Lights (Bonus Track)"	01:24
19.	"So&So's and Emeralds (Bonus Track)"	02:49
Total length:		45:11
