= Side 3 =

Side 3 may refer to:

- Side 3 (Raspberries album), 1973
- Side 3 (Circulatory System album), 2010
