= Neon Light =

Neon Light or Neon Lights may refer to:

- Neon lighting, a form of lighting
- Neon lamp a light source that is based on gas discharge

== Music ==
=== Albums and EPs ===
- Neon Lights, a 2001 album by Simple Minds
- Neon Lights, a 2021 EP by Annie

=== Songs ===
- "Neon Light" (Blake Shelton song), 2014
- "Neon Light", a song by Circulatory System from their 2014 album Mosaics Within Mosaics
- "Neon Lights" (Demi Lovato song), 2013
  - The Neon Lights Tour, by Demi Lovato
- "Neon Lights", a song by Kraftwerk from their 1978 album The Man-Machine
- "Neon Lights", a song by Sahara Hotnights on their 2007 album What If Leaving Is a Loving Thing
- "Neon Lights", a song by Natasha Bedingfield from her 2010 album Strip Me
- "Neon Lights", a song by Annie featuring Jake Shears from her 2021 EP of the same name

== Other ==
- "Neon Lights", a storyline in the science fiction comedy webtoon series Live with Yourself!
