= Marshmallow Coasting =

Studio album by Marshmallow Coast
- Released: October 24, 2000
- Genre: Indie Pop; Indie Rock
- Length: 46:27
- Label: Kindercore Records

Marshmallow Coast chronology
Timesquare (album) (2000)	Marshmallow Coasting (2000)	Ride the Lightning (Marshmallow Coast album) (2001)

Professional ratings
Review scores
Source	Rating
AllMusic	4/5 stars

Marshmallow Coasting is the third album by Marshmallow Coast, released in 2000.

== Critical reception ==
PopMatters wrote that the album's opening track may contain "the most bizarre mini-intro ever committed to disc". Exclaim! wrote that the "surreal bubble-gum pop hits its mark more often than not and steers clear of the sickly sweet and fey excesses of Of Montreal".

== Track listing ==
No.	Title	Length
1.	"Lilypad"	03:05
2.	"Hung Up"	02:53
3.	"Golden Harp"	02:32
4.	"Oblong Destiny"	02:11
5.	"Bizarre Classical V"	02:51
6.	"Lonliest Heart In Texas"	02:40
7.	"Siddartha"	03:04
8.	"Blow My Mind"	03:04
9.	"Shimmering In a Bulb of Glass"	02;29
10.	"There Will Come a Time"	03:34
11.	"Bizarre Classical VI"	02:33
12.	"In the Sea"	02:15
13.	"Insane"	02:07
14.	"Audience Is Deaf"	01:06
15.	"Lil' Fun Machine"	04:00
16.	"David and the Giant Crabs (Bonus Track)"	03:29
17.	"Listen to Your Heart Beat (Bonus Track)"	02:26
Total length:		46:27
