= Romeo Gavioli =

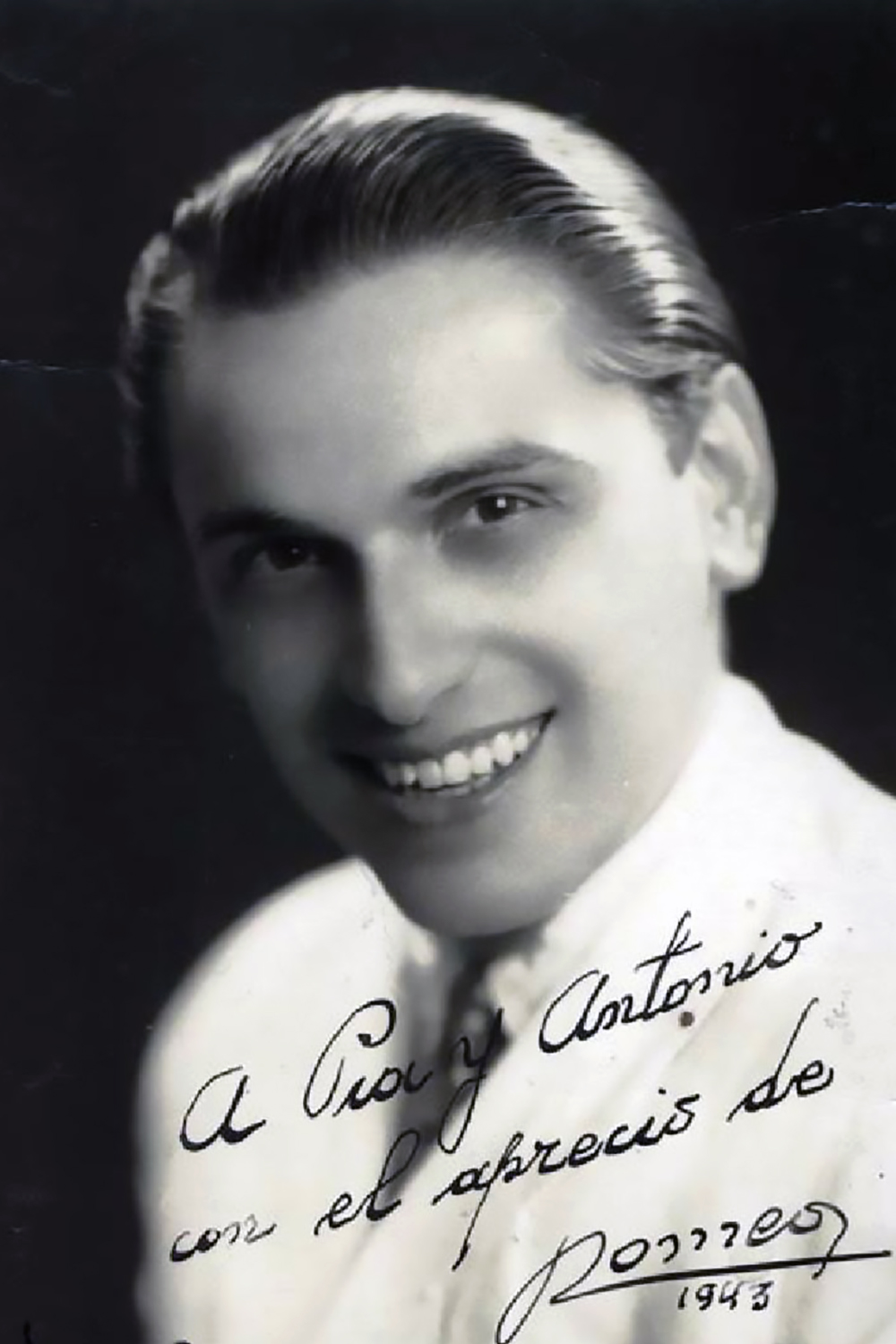
- Romeo Gavioli

Background information
- Born: February 5, 1913; Montevideo, Uruguay
- Died: April 17, 1957 (aged 44) Montevideo, Uruguay
- Genres: Tango
- Occupations: Singer, orchestral conductor, composer
- Instruments: Drums, trumpet

Romeo Alfredo Gavioli (5 February 1913 – 17 April 1957) was a Uruguayan musician, tango and candombe singer, and conductor of a típica orchestra.

== Life ==
Gavioli was born in the La Unión neighborhood of Montevideo, although he spent his childhood and adolescence in the La Comercial neighborhood of the same city.

He studied violin with maestro Américo Pioli. In 1926, he formed the group Los Tres Bemoles, where he played the violin alongside Mario Orrico (also on violin) and Guillermo Aguirre (on drums) on stages in Minas and Montevideo.

In 1929, he began playing in Juan Baüer's orquesta típica "Firpito", and in 1931 he joined Héctor Gentile's orchestra, debuting at the Tupi-Nambá, where they met Roberto Fontaina, who connected them with Radio Carve.

In 1933, together with Lalo Etchegoncelay and double bassist Panchito Pons, he performed in the live radio studios of several Buenos Aires stations. Although he never stopped playing the violin, he increasingly appeared as the group's singer.

In 1934, he joined the renowned trio Los Carve, which crossed over to Buenos Aires in 1935 and became known as Los Dandys.

In 1939, he was invited by maestro Edgardo Donato to join his orchestra as a singer. He worked with Donato for several years under the name "Romeo Gavio."

In 1943, Gavioli returned to Montevideo, where he began his most mature phase as a conductor, composer, and singer.

Affiliated with the Communist Party, he was one of the main participants in the formation of SUDEI (Uruguayan Society of Artists and Performers) and, at the same time, brought his music to the unions involved in conflicts.

In 1954, he founded "Casachica" together with Lalo Etchegoncelay and Luis Amengual, where artists such as Cedar Viglietti recorded.

On April 17, 1957, he committed suicide by driving his car into the waters of the port of Montevideo.

== His own orchestra ==
The initial lineup of his orchestra included:

- Romeo Gavioli as singer and conductor of the orchestra
- José Kaplám on piano
- Rubén Tovía on double bass
- David Dullman, Antonio Licans, and Romeo Gavioli himself on violins
- Rolando Gavioli and ¨Bianco Brothers¨ : José Matteo, Juan Capobianco and Antonio Mateo on bandoneons
- Rolando Gavioli was the arranger of the pieces
- Juan Angel Silva, Wellington Silva and Raul Silva in Candombe Drums and in another period they were the Bonasorte Brothers, Enrique Bonasorte, Nelson Bonasorte and Tucuta Soto

Very soon, Gavioli incorporated drums into the orchestra and added candombe canción to the repertoire of tangos, waltzes, and milongas. In 1947, together with Carmelo Imperio as a partner, he premiered the play El nombre más lindo del mundo, written by Wimpi, at the 18 de Julio Theater.

== As a composer ==
Romeo Gavioli was the author of several tangos, among which are:

- María del Carmen
- Pelota de trapo
- Mi Montevideo
- Payaso triste

And the candombes:

- Tinta negra
- Luna carnavalera
- Abuelito blanco
- Fiesta del tambor
- Estampa del 900
- Baile de los morenos

== Discography ==
=== LPs ===
- El baile de los morenos (Sondor SLP-026)
- Candombes (Sondor 33023. 1956)
- El creador de melodías (Sondor 33067)
- Vals de los 15 años (Sondor 33146. 1973)
- Jardín de Francia (Sondor 44191. 1981)
- Borocoto chas chas (Sondor. 1985)
- Lo mejor de Romeo Gavioli (Sondor 4.892-2. 1994)

=== Singles ===
- Compañero bandoneón / Payaso triste (Sondor 5008. 1944)
- Melodía gitana / Baile de los morenos (Sondor 5050. 1946)
- El tren de las once / (Sondor 5084. 1946)
- La fogata de San Pedro / (Sondor 5088. 1947)
- El escobero / Montevideo dolorido (Sondor 5119)
- Pastora / (con Pepita Fernández. Sondor 5153. 1948)
- Candombe de Navidad / (Sondor 5203. 1948)
- Abuelito Blanco / Bulevar de Paris (Sondor 5215, 1949)
- Luna carnavalera / Tinta negra (Sondor 5243. 1949)
- Piel morena / 15 años (Sondor 50014)
- El cochero / Estampas del 800 (Sondor 50238)
