= Perhaps Transparent =

Independent record label based in New Jersey, US

- Founded: 19??
- Founder: Gabriel Walsh; Stephen Connolly
- Genre: Psychedelia, psychedelic folk
- Country of origin: United States
- Location: Jersey City, New Jersey

Perhaps Transparent is a Jersey City, New Jersey–based independent record label founded by Gabriel Walsh and Stephen Connolly. The label releases psychedelic and psychedelic folk. Artists on this label tend to include song, narrative or conceptual structures that are deliberately complicated and/or obscure – Your Team Ring buries puzzles in its albums, Flaming Fire utilizes classic Greek theater elements, Pothole Skinny experiment in the sounds of psychedelic folk, IE: the woods-folk-avant-dark-strings, and Irene Moon's music is principally about her interests and research in entomology. PG Six, a.k.a. Pat Gubler from Tower Recordings explores song craft through the resurgence of 1960's British Follk revival and experimental bray harp drones. Through live CD-R releases, and the vinyl versions of his Amish Records releases, one can get a keen glimpse of Pat's Musical journey.

== Artists on this label ==
- American Watercolor Movement
- Calvin, Don't Jump!
- Flaming Fire
- Irene Moon
- PG Six
- Outhern Acific
- Pothole Skinny
- Stephen Connolly
- Your Team Ring
- Fireworks Collage Project with Daniel Carter

== See also ==
- List of record labels
