= Swimmeret (album) =

Studio album by Espadrille
- Released: 2001
- Recorded: 2000
- Genre: Alternative
- Label: Spare Me Records

Professional ratings
Review scores
Source	Rating
Allmusic	4/5 stars

Swimmeret was the debut album of Espadrille, whose members were Alice Cohen (formerly of The Vels and Die Monster Die), instrumentalist Bill Miller, and drummer Jon Flack.

"Swimmeret" was issued in 2001 under the Spare Me Records label.

== Track listing ==
1. "Pretty Monster"
2. "Fleur de Lis"
3. "Low Lustre"
4. "Green Envy"
5. "Stand Clear"
6. "Bikini Girl"
7. "Wonder Wheel"
