= Seniors & Juniors =

Seniors and Juniors

Studio album by Marshmallow Coast
- Released: 1999
- Genre: Indie Pop, Indie Rock, Jazz
- Length: 33:11
- Label: Kindercore Records

Marshmallow Coast chronology
Seniors and Juniors (1999)	Timesquare (album) (2000)

Seniors and Juniors is a 1999 album and the first studio album by Elephant 6 affiliate band Marshmallow Coast.

== Track listing ==
All tracks are written by Andy Gonzales.

No.	Title	Length
1.	"Off To School"	01:30
2.	"Seniors And Juniors"	02:28
3.	"Mashed Potato Light"	02:31
4.	"Bizarre Classical I"	03:42
5.	"Ancient Chinese Secret"	02:37
6.	"Interlude"	00:43
7.	"Broken Comb"	02:25
8.	"Bizarre Classical II"	02:30
9.	"Sad Piano Song"	01:24
10.	"Creative Writing"	04:22
11.	"Home From School"	01:14
12.	"Home From School 2"	01:53
13.	"Little Pythagoras"	05:52

Professional ratings
Review scores
Source	Rating
AllMusic[3]	4/5 stars
