= Paquita Bernardo =

Argentinian composer

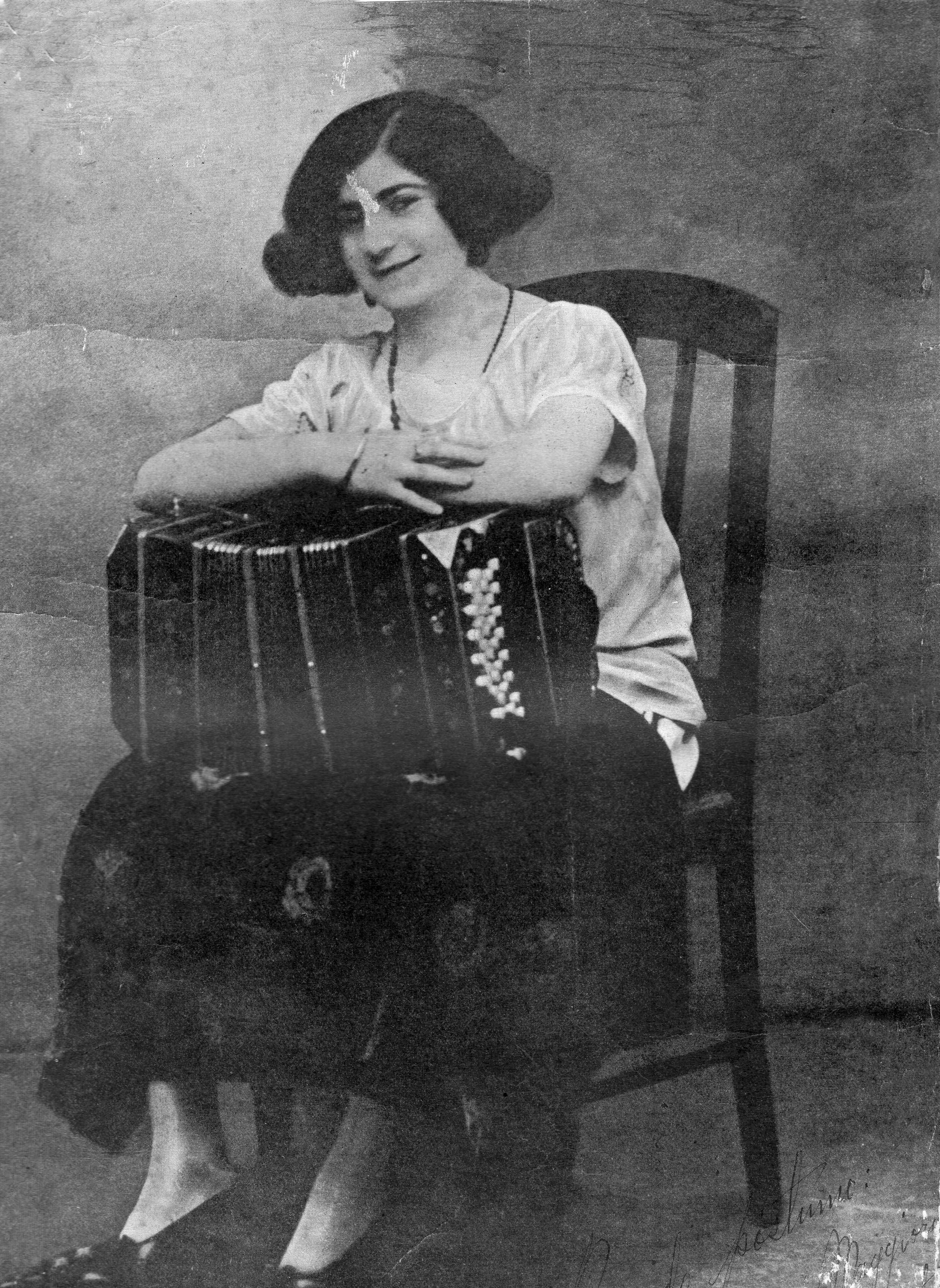
Paquita Bernardo

Paquita Bernardo, born Francisca Cruz Bernardo and nicknamed La Flor de Villa Crespo (May 1, 1900, in Buenos Aires, Argentina – April 14, 1925), was a tango composer, the first professional female bandoneon player of Argentine tango, and the first woman to found an Orquesta típica.

She was the daughter of Spanish immigrants José Bernardo (born in 1860 in Almería, Andalucía and emigrated to Buenos Aires in 1887) and María Jiménez (also from southern Spain and ten years younger than José). Paquita was born in Buenos Aires on Gorriti Street, near the corner of Canning (whose current name is Scalabrini Ortiz). She had many siblings: Enrique (1889), Mercedes (1890), Josefina (1891), Arturo (1895), Paquita (1900), Luis (1903), Jose (1906), and María (1911). She began her primary education at a public school on Padilla Street after her parents had moved to the neighborhood of Villa Crespo al Pasaje Mangiante (later disappeared), which was located in Camargo 5691. In the sixth grade (1915), her parents sent her to study piano at the conservatory of Professor Catalina Torres. Here, the young José Servidio, who was nicknamed "Balija", attended to study the bandoneon. Balija, who over the years would become a well-known musician and author of the tango El bulín de la calle Ayacucho. Meeting Balija, gave Paquita the opportunity to learn to play the bandoneon and study it in secret with the help of Augusto Pedro Berto Note. During this period, young women could only play the guitar or piano, not the bandoneon, since it forces one to open and close their legs. Paquita was able to convince her father to allow her to continue studying this instrument and she received lessons from Pedro Maffia and Enrique Garcia.

She composed about fifteen pieces of music, starting with the tango Floreal, that was recorded by Juan Carlos Cobián, Cerro Divino (a waltz she composed in homage to Montevideo when she was working there), and Cachito, a tango dedicated to Horacio J. Domínguez (the son of the owner of Café Domínguez). Cachito, later became La Enmascarada when Francisco García Jiménez wrote lyrics and it was recorded by Carlos Gardel and also by Roberto Firpo in 1955. She also composed Soñando, with lyrics by Eugenio Cárdenas, which received sixth prize in the first tango national competition organized at the Grand Splendid Theater by Max Glücksmann in 1924. Other works included the tango La Luciérnaga and the Pasodoble Dejadme solo and La maja. Bernardo created the first Orquesta típica founded by a woman called the Orquesta Paquita. Paquita, who did not record any songs, died in her neighborhood of Villa Crespo on April 14, 1925, as a result of complications from a poorly treated cold. Some reports of her death stated that she suffered from tuberculosis.
