= Signal Morning =

Studio album by Circulatory System
- Released: September 8, 2009
- Genre: Psychedelic rock, noise rock
- Length: 46:15
- Label: Cloud
- Producer: W. Cullen Hart

Circulatory System chronology
Inside Views (2001)	Signal Morning (2009)	Side 3 (2010)

Professional ratings
Aggregate scores
Source	Rating
Metacritic	81/100
Review scores
Source	Rating
AllMusic	3.5/5 stars
Alternative Press	3.5/5 stars
Cokemachineglow	86%
Entertainment Weekly	A−
Paste	8.9/10
Pitchfork	8.1/10
PopMatters	9/10
Spin	3.5/5 stars
Tiny Mix Tapes	3.5/5 stars
Under the Radar	5/10

Signal Morning is the second studio album by the psychedelic rock band Circulatory System. It was released on September 8, 2009, on the Cloud Recordings label.

== Track listing ==
All tracks are composed by Will Cullen Hart; side one edited and sequenced by Charlie Johnston and Nesey Gallons; and side two edited and sequenced by Nesey Gallons.

=== Side A ===
No.	Title	Length
1.	"Woodpecker Greeting Worker Ant"	3:22
2.	"Rocks and Stones"	2:42
3.	"This Morning (We Remembered Everything)"	2:43
4.	"Tiny Concerts"	2:04
5.	"Electronic Diversion"	0:47
6.	"Overjoyed"	2:29
7.	"The Breathing Universe"	1:09
8.	"News from the Heavenly Loom"	0:23
9.	"Round Again"	5:36

=== Side B ===
No.	Title	Length
1.	"I You We"	1:31
2.	"Blasting Through"	4:15
3.	"Particle Parades"	4:44
4.	"Gold Will Stay"	3:37
5.	"The Frozen Lake / The Symmetry"	2:38
6.	"Until Moon Medium Hearts the Message"	3:17
7.	"(Drifts)"	2:04
8.	"Signal Morning"	2:54
Total length:		46:15
