= Phreak Phantasy =

Studio album by Marshmallow Coast
- Released: 2009
- Genre: pop Rock Indie Rock Indie pop
- Length: 31:58
- Label: Happy Happy Birthday To Me Records

Marshmallow Coast chronology
Say It In Slang (2006)	Phreak Phantasy (2009)	Seniors and Juniors Strikes Back (2011)

Phreak Phantasy is the seventh album by Marshmallow Coast.

== Track listing ==
No.	Title	Length
1.	"Nasty Dream"	04:13
2.	"Millionaire"	01:57
3.	"Hangin' On A Cloud"	03:32
4.	"Please Don't"	02:56
5.	"Electro March"	02:03
6.	"Scathom"	02:21
7.	"Sara's Song"	03:22
8.	"Lonely Days"	03:50
9.	"Phreak Phantasy"	07:44
Total length:		31:58
