= Irene Moon =

American entomologist and musician

- Birth name: Katja Seltmann
- Genres: Avant-garde, noise, electronica, DIY
- Occupation(s): Artist, entomologist, musician, lecturer
- Instrument(s): Vocals, synthesizers, drum machine, samples
- Years active: 1996–present
- Labels: Begonia Society, Surefire, Ignivomous, Carbon Records, APOP Records, Yod, Armageddon Record Shop, fusetron, tomentosa, RRRecords, Eclipse Records, Mimaroglu Music Sales, White Denim
- Website: begoniasociety.org

Irene Moon (born Katja Seltmann) is an American entomologist, performance artist, musician, playwright, actor, and filmmaker. She has published in the field of entomology as Katja Seltmann, and is the current director of the Cheadle Center for Biodiversity and Ecological Restoration at the University of California, Santa Barbara.

However, she is best known for her alter-ego Irene Moon, under which name she has released a series of musical recordings, performance art-entomology lectures, insect/human hybrid dolls and Auk Theatre, a cycle of absurdist-horror plays that she writes and performs. She has also toured extensively throughout the United States and Europe in all of these capacities. From 2015 to 2020, she co-hosted with Yon Visell the weekly science and music radio program Unknown Territories, on KCSB 91.9 FM in Santa Barbara.

== Biography ==
Moon was born in Raleigh, North Carolina. She began creating performances and films with the Melted Men, Deonna Mann and the Noisettes in Athens, Georgia during the late 1990s, and recorded her first album in 1996. She moved to Lexington, Kentucky, in 2000 for masters work in entomology with a concentration in insect systematics and evolution. While in Lexington, Moon developed Auk Theatre and began recording music under the name the Collection of the Late Howell Bend (credited for the soundtracks to Auk Theatre). Moon moved to Szeged, Hungary to study and earn a Ph.D. in ecology. Moon worked as a research associate in multiple subjects, and she now works in the field of biodiversity informatics/entomology at The University of California Santa Barbara Cheadle Center for Biodiversity and Ecological Restoration. She previously worked at the American Museum of Natural History. She continues to create musical and performance art.

== Scientific career ==
While Moon is most well known for her artistic performances, most of her performances are created specifically to perform or teach science. Moon uses the intersection between science and art to allow for communication about science and natural history through popular culture.

Moon performs "lectographies" in an attempt to educate people on the beauty of the insect world. In these "lectographies," Moon uses multiple forms of media such as film, song, dance, handouts, slides, PowerPoint presentations, preserved specimens, and any other form of media that Moon believes will be useful in teaching the audience about the world of insects.

Moon also has over 20 years of experience researching entomology. Specifically, insect morphology and evolution, Hymenoptera systematics, plant-insect interactions and other studies focusing on natural history and science.

== Lectures ==
Moon has given surrealist entomological lectures throughout the United States and Europe, and has toured with noise music bands including the Hair Police and psychedelic folk band Eyes and Arms of Smoke. Her lectures are accompanied by music, slideshows, flip charts, recorded commentary, insect sounds, and often feature background film accompaniment. Lectures are often followed by pop quizzes and/or question and answer sessions. Topics have included the Cornu aspersum snail, the death's-head hawkmoth, and the Nantucket pine tip moth. She has lectured at such diverse venues as the Knitting Factory in New York City, Sluggo's in Pensacola, Florida, the 2003 Entomological Society of America Annual Meeting and Exhibition, and at an abandoned cathedral in Amsterdam.

== Recordings ==
Moon has released several of her lectures as recordings. She has also released the musical accompaniment to those lectures as stand-alone albums. Her first full-length record, Floralaldehyde, was released in 1996 and re-released in 1999. Notable works include Scientifically Speaking with Irene Moon, a series of her lectures and music, From Field Station A (1997, re-pressed 2004), and the soundtrack to the Thin Wax Line, an animated bee propaganda film.

== Radio show ==
Moon co-hosted with Yon Visell from 2015 to 2020 a weekly radio show called Unknown Territories, an hour-long cultural arts program. Her radio shows covered a variety of scientific and historic topics such as combustion, rust, and evolution. She has also interviewed scientists and researchers about their work and/or scientific findings through a series called, "Let's Talk Science."

Natural history work has inspired much of the music played on the radio show. Moon plays several pieces that are specifically about natural history collections.

== Music ==
Aside from her recorded lectures, Moon has also released music under the name Collection of the Late Howell Bend. Notable titles among these works include For the Neonate (2004–2005), and a split with Kentucky-based psychedelic band Warmer Milks. The Collection of the Late Howell Bend have supplied the musical soundtracks to Moon's Auk Theatre. Moon's music (and lectures) have been released and distributed by Begonia Society, Surefire, Ignivomous, Carbon Records, APOP Records, Yod, Armageddon Record Shop, fusetron, tomentosa, RRRecords, Eclipse Records, Mimaroglu Music Sales, and White Denim.

== Auk Theatre ==
Moon describes Auk Theatre as: "Noisy, short and simple Absurdist theatre with only the best topics in consideration; shoes, cardboard, bats, wine, shapes and murder." To date, thirteen "Auks" have been constructed and performed. Their performances are marked by overstated art design, obscure, usually frightening subject matter, surrealism, medievalism, and occasionally, graphic violence. Auk Theatre's membership has included artist Matt Minter, musician and performance artist Sara O'Keefe, musician Jeremy Midkiff (as Jeramy Midkiff), Deek Hoi, Ellen Molle', Christopher Cprek, Trevor Tremaine and Robert Beatty of Hair Police, Darryl Cook, and Ben Fulton and John Ferguson of Ulysses.

== Films ==
In addition to several filmed performance of Auk Theatre, Moon also makes films that support her lectures and musical performances, as well as stand-alone short films. These films mix factual information (usually entomological, but also historical, occult, and esoterica) with her own music, field-recorded insect sound samples, photomicrography, and animation. Initially, Moon used 8mm film for her shorts, but has since experimented with videotape and DV. About her films, Moon has remarked: "Primarily the visuals ... explain or emphasize the emotion of a composition. These films are highly synthesized and predominantly fantasy. They are memories not processed, distortions of important details that are often missed or not remembered."

== Doll-making ==
Moon has also created insect-human hybrid dolls, which she used for a series of "micro-puppet" shows. These dolls were sold at the La Superette gallery in New York.

== Works ==
=== Recordings ===
- From Field Station A (10 inch, 1997, re-pressed in 2004)
- the SUPLICO tape series (endless loop cassettes, 1998–2000)
- Birdsley (endless loop cassette, 1998)
- Floralaldehyde (12 inch, 1996, re-issued 1999)
- A Cocktail from the Preferred Host from Perhaps Transparent. A series of short moon segments and sound effects for DJs. (2000)
- People Like Us and Friends vol.1 Track is one from ABC Radio National in Australia that Moon did with People Like Us and the Evolution Control Committee. (2000)
- SUPLICO Gods of Tundra label (cassette, 2000–2001)
- Lovely Larva (cassette, 2001)
- Halloween Scarey Sounds (HeSDOM, 2002)
- Grooming Casualties split with FsLUX (cassette, 2002)
- From the Parlor (DVD, 2002)
- Pangolin Variations split with Ergo Phizmiz (2004)
- Dentist Auk/Split with Ortho (7 inch, 2004)
- Windpipe Moods, Compilation of Contemporary Sound Poetry (2004)
- For the Neonate (ten-inch, 2004–2005)
- Free Matter for the Blind Fantastic Compilation CDs from Providence RI, 2004)
- BLD Quilt (video compilation DVD, 2005) ordnung recORDs/Ignivomous/Invisible Generation
- Find Ripe Fields with Christopher Cpreck(Deathbomb Arc Tape Club, split cassette, 2006)
- Esquisite Corpse compilation with Akbar del Inizio, Michael Mahalchick, Rob Millis, Metalux, John Fell Ryan, Pengo, Amir Shoat, Brian Turner, Robert McNeill and Sarah Bernat (Museum of Fine Art Houston, 2006)
- Auk Theatre split with Mudboy (Bread and Animals cassette, 2006)
- Women take back the Noise Compilation. (ubuibi, 2006)
- I Don't Think the Dirt Belongs to the Grass Carbon Records, 2006
- Thin Wax Line Soundtrack to the film Thin Wax Line by Dave Fischer with assistance from Christopher Cprek, Katy Wizard, and Yellow Crystal Star.
- Collection of the Late Howell Bend/ Warmer Milks split (LP, 2007).
- Zelphabet Volume I Compilation. (Zelphabet, 2009)

=== Auk Theatre ===
- Auk One: Monster Auk
- Auk Two:Betratal Auk
- Auk Three:Dental Auk
- Auk Four: Bat Auk
- Auk Five: Conjur Auk
- Shadow Auk Formal: Auk of the Two Sisters
- Auk Six: Bad Apple Auk
- Auk Seven: Neither Auk
- Auk Eight: Presents Auk
- Auk Nine: Humors Auk
- Auk Ten: Salamander Auk
- Auk Eleven: Ten Phases of Fallen
- Auk Twelve: Court of Common Pleas
- Auk Thirteen: Auk of Nen Valentine

=== Films ===
- The Insectavore (1997)
- Perfectly Pleasant Decomposistion (1998)
- Terroristic Entomology (1999)
- P Dish (1999)
- Suprizez (2005)
- Snowflake (2005)
- Court of Common Pleas (2006)
