= Vangelis Rides Again =

Studio album by Marshmallow Coast
- Released: May 5, 2015
- Genre: Neo-Psychedelia Pop Indie-pop Rock Indie-Rock
- Length: 23:21
- Label: Happy Happy Birthday To Me Records

Marshmallow Coast chronology
Seniors and Juniors Strikes Back (2011)	Vangelis Rides Again (2015)

Professional ratings
Review scores
Source	Rating
AllMusic	4/5 stars

Vangelis Rides Again is a 2015 studio album by Marshmallow Coast, their ninth overall.

== Track listing ==
The tracks are:-

No.	Title	Length
1.	"Hash Out Cash Out"	04:14
2.	"Vocal Interlude"	00:36
3.	"Hills Are Alive"	03:17
4.	"Chatter"	00:10
5.	"Vangelis Rides Again"	03:14
6.	"Mystical Shit"	02:16
7.	"Homeless Baby"	03:02
8.	"Foreign Denial"	02:46
9.	"Forever"	03:47
Total length:		23:21
