= Jacob Morris =

Jacob Morris may refer to

- Jacob Morris (activist), New York City activist and public historian
- Jacob Morris (rugby union), English rugby union player
- Jacob Morris, member of the 23rd New York State Legislature

== See also ==
- Jake Morris (disambiguation)
- Jacob Norris (disambiguation)
