= Will Cullen Hart =

American musician (1971–2024)

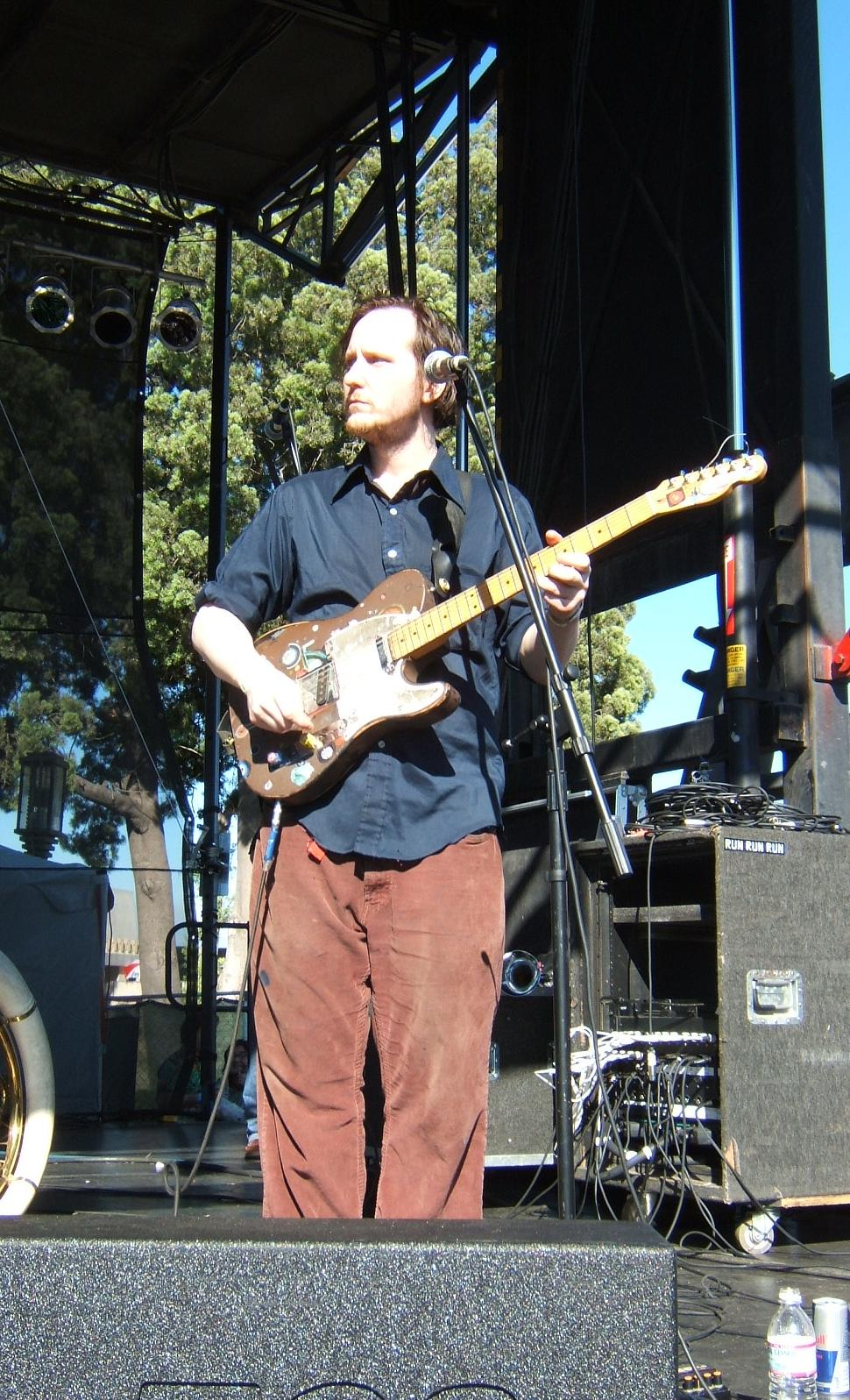
- Hart in 2005
- Born: June 14, 1971; Ruston, Louisiana, U.S.
- Died: November 29, 2024 (aged 53); Athens, Georgia, U.S.
- Education: Ruston High School
- Occupations: Musician; singer; songwriter
- Years active: 1987–2024
- Musical career
- Genres: Experimental; neo-psychedelia; psychedelic pop; indie rock; musique concrète
- Formerly of: The Olivia Tremor Control; Circulatory System; Synthetic Flying Machine; The Always Red Society; Cranberry Lifecycle; Black Swan Network

William Cullen Hart (June 14, 1971 – November 29, 2024) was an American musician, singer, songwriter and visual artist. He was a co-founder of the Elephant 6 Recording Company, as well as the rock band the Olivia Tremor Control. Following that band's breakup, Hart and several other former members regrouped to create Circulatory System. Hart's music was characterized by its blend of indie rock, Beatlesque psychedelic pop and musique concrète.

== Recording career ==
=== Early years ===
Will Cullen Hart was born on June 14, 1971, in Ruston, Louisiana. His parents, both interior designers, divorced and moved around the country, leading Hart to spend parts of his childhood in Alabama, Colorado, and Texas before returning to Ruston in ninth grade. Among his friends there were future Elephant 6 collaborators Bill Doss, Jeff Mangum and Robert Schneider. The teenagers shared a passion and interest in home recording, influenced by John Cage, punk rock, krautrock, and 1960s psychedelic bands like The Beatles, The Beach Boys and The Zombies. Some of his earliest musical projects included his solo recording moniker The Always Red Society, which released its sole tape Giant Chocolate Think Tank Blues in 1993 (reissued in 2014), and a collaboration with Mangum called Cranberry Lifecycle, a "little 4-track pop thing" whose recordings were spoken of very highly by Schneider and remained highly sought after by fans until they finally leaked in 2023. Mangum, Doss, and Hart then formed the group Synthetic Flying Machine, which evolved to become The Olivia Tremor Control.

=== The Olivia Tremor Control ===
The Olivia Tremor Control's first release was the extended play California Demise in 1994, on which many of the band's signature elements, such as complex vocal harmonization, were already present. After the EP's release, the band briefly disbanded, with Hart moving to Denver, Colorado, before returning to Athens to reunite with Doss and record the band's debut album, Music from the Unrealized Film Script: Dusk at Cubist Castle at Pet Sounds studio, with Robert Schneider as producer. His artistic contrasts with Doss became evident during recording for the album, with Doss gravitating towards pop music and Hart writing more experimental material. In that regard, Hart was influenced by the 1969 White Noise album An Electric Storm, which led to the splicing of his bandmates' songs with experimental electronic pieces on the band's sophomore album, 1999's Black Foliage: Animation Music Volume One. The album was as ambitious an undertaking as Dusk, and was met with positive reviews, with Pitchfork's Paul Thompson describing it as "among the most satisfying psychedelic albums of any decade", going on to compare it to the Buddhist concept of Bardo.

=== Circulatory System, Olivia Tremor Control reunion and death ===
After the release of Black Foliage, tensions grew between Doss and Hart. According to Doss, Hart wanted to take a hiatus from music and was suffering from early symptoms of then-undiagnosed multiple sclerosis. The two had a falling out, and the Olivia Tremor Control broke up in 2000, releasing both an early singles compilation, Singles and Beyond, and an EP of a John Peel session before moving off to other projects. Doss would reactivate his solo recording project The Sunshine Fix, and Hart formed his next project, Circulatory System, with some of his former Olivia Tremor Control bandmates. Circulatory System released their self-titled debut album in 2001 on Cloud Recordings, along with a companion album of ambient noise and sound collages known as Inside Views (in a similar vein to the ambient Cubist Castle companion album Explanation II). Hart also released two musique concrète albums under his own name that year, Circuits and Silver.

The Olivia Tremor Control's gradual reunification process began when they were invited to play the UK music festival All Tomorrow's Parties in April 2005. This edition of the festival was curated by the actor Vincent Gallo. The band started working on a new album tentatively titled The Same Place, and released two new singles, although the recording process was slowed after Doss' death due to an aneurysm at the age of 43 in 2012. Hart and the remaining members decided to continue working on the album in his memory, with Hart saying in 2019 that it would be the band's final album: "We have three sides worth of songs done, though they're not sequenced properly yet to run three sides."

In 2009, Circulatory System released the album Signal Morning on Cloud Recordings. 2009 also saw the release of Side 3, an album of alternative mixes and b-sides from Signal Morning, sequenced by Olivia and Circulatory System drummer Derek Almstead.

In 2014, Circulatory System released their third album, double LP Mosaics Within Mosaics, also on Cloud.

On November 29, 2024, the Olivia Tremor Control released the singles "Garden of Light" and "The Same Place", the band's first new music in 13 years, as part of the soundtrack for the 2022 documentary The Elephant 6 Recording Co.. Hours later, E6 co-founder Robert Schneider announced Hart had died that morning. Following his death, The Same Place was ultimately completed by the band's surviving members, and was released on October 23, 2026.

== Personal life and death ==
Will Cullen Hart was also a visual artist. He created most, if not all, of the artwork for the Olivia Tremor Control and Circulatory System (among other Elephant 6 bands), as well as individual pieces. In a 2008 online interview, John Fernandes stated that Hart had been diagnosed with multiple sclerosis. Hart was married to his wife, Kelly Hart, since 2012.

Hart died from a heart attack on November 29, 2024, at the age of 53.

== Discography ==
The Olivia Tremor Control

- Music from the Unrealized Film Script: Dusk at Cubist Castle (1996)
- Explanation II: Instrumental Themes and Dream Sequences (1998)
- Black Foliage: Animation Music Volume One (1999)
- Singles and Beyond (2000)
- John Peel Session (2000)
- The Game You Play Is In Your Head, Pts. 1,2,& 3 (2011)
- Garden of Light / The Same Place (2024)

Circulatory System

- Circulatory System (2001)
- Inside Views (2001)
- Signal Morning (2009)
- Side 3 (2010)
- Mosaics Within Mosaics (2014)

Solo

- Giant Chocolate Think Tank Blues (as The Always Red Society) (1993, reissued 2014)
- Circuits (2001)
- Silver (2001)
