= Inside Views =

Studio album by Circulatory System
- Released: 2001
- Genre: Indie rock
- Length: 41:59
- Label: Orange Twin

Circulatory System chronology
Circulatory System (2001)	Inside Views (2001)	Signal Morning (2009)

Professional ratings
Review scores
Source	Rating
AllMusic	3/5 stars
Pitchfork Media	(7.9/10)

Inside Views (2001) is essentially a remix album of Circulatory System's first album, Circulatory System. It is made up of "cut and paste style fragments, demos and animation derived from pieces of the circulatory system album". The album is meant to be played on shuffle mode.

All versions come in an unmarked CD case, sprayed green, with a picture of a different bird pasted on the front.

== Track listing ==
All tracks composed by Will Cullen Hart, and are untitled.

No.	Title	Length
1.	"One"	3:47
2.	"Two"	3:42
3.	"Three"	3:44
4.	"Four"	2:30
5.	"Five"	2:22
6.	"Six"	2:56
7.	"Seven"	2:56
8.	"Eight"	1:50
9.	"Nine"	6:20
10.	"Ten"	4:31
11.	"Eleven"	2:55
12.	"Twelve"	2:17
13.	"Thirteen"	2:11

There is a later version of the album which has ten tracks of different lengths.
