= AntiStar (album) =

Antistar

Studio album by Marshmallow Coast
- Released: November 4, 2003
- Recorded: May–July 2003 at Bel-Air studios, Georgia
- Genre: Pop, rock, indie pop, indie rock
- Length: 37:28
- Label: Misra
- Producer: Andy Gonzales, Jason Nesmith

Marshmallow Coast chronology
Ride The Lightning (2001)	Antistar (2003)	Say It In Slang (2006)

AntiStar is the fifth album by Marshmallow Coast.

== Track listing ==
All tracks are written by Andy Gonzales

No.	Title	Length
1.	"Springtime's Here"	3:56
2.	"She Could"	3:58
3.	"Pink Underwear"	4:14
4.	"Swift Little Mercury"	2:45
5.	"Kinda True"	4:29
6.	"Tea for Two"	4:48
7.	"Night and Day"	3:17
8.	"Bizarre Classical #7"	2:56
9.	"Sunrise"	2:39
10.	"Animal"	1:42
11.	"Chinese Lady"	2:51
Total length:		37:28

== Personnel ==
- Sara Kirkpatrick – flute, vocals
- Andy Gonzales – guitar, bass, keyboard

Professional ratings
Review scores
Source	Rating
All Music	2.5/5 stars

- Jason Nesmith – percussion, human beatbox, banjo, keyboards, effects, glockenspiel, sampler
- Eric Harris – Drums
- Derek Dibono – Bongos, Congas

=== Production ===
- Jason Nesmith – engineer, mixed by, mastered
