= The Instruments =

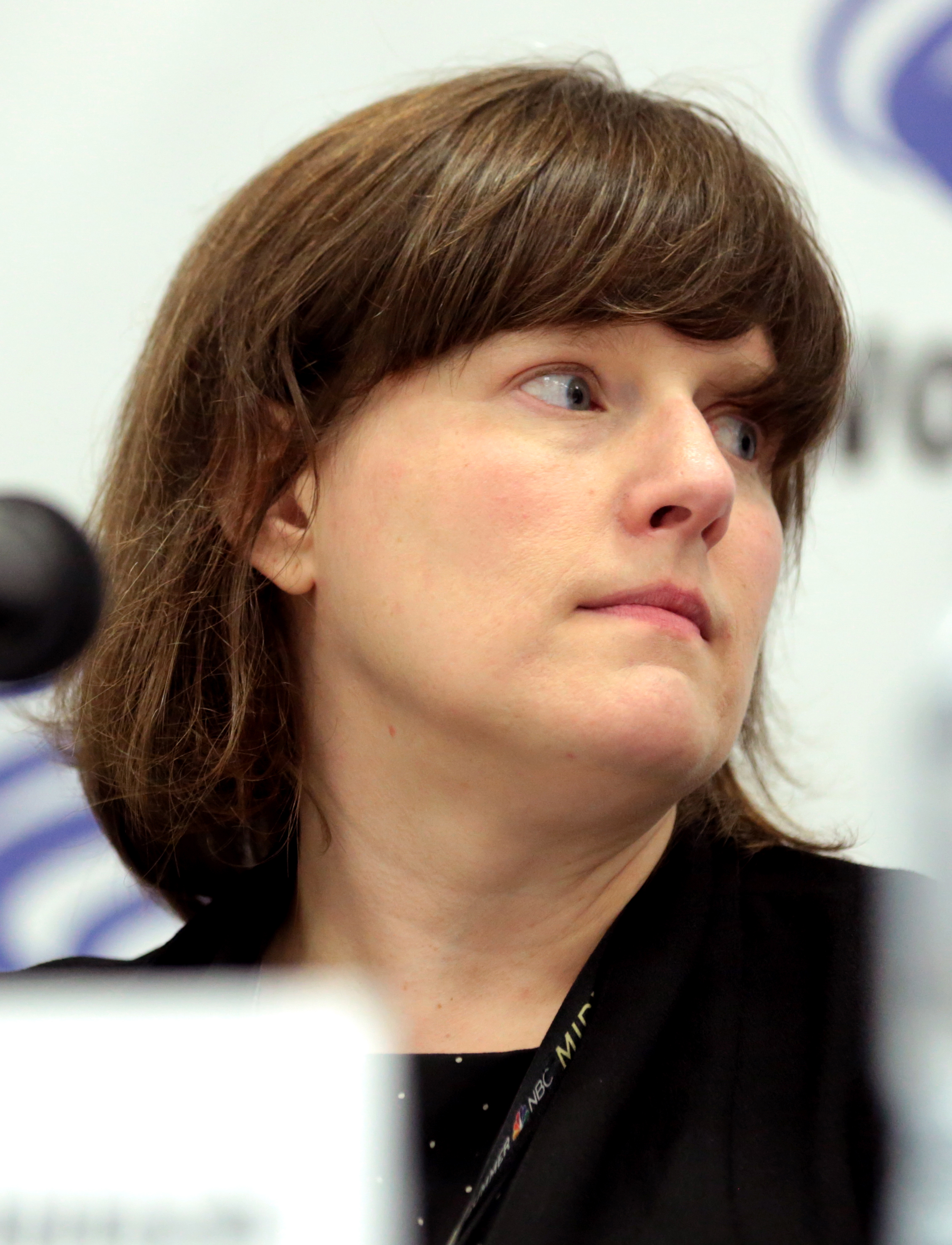
Heather McIntosh

The Instruments is the musical project of Heather McIntosh, cellist in a number of Athens, Georgia groups including Circulatory System, Elf Power, and Japancakes. They released three albums between 2003 and 2008. Other members of the band include Peter Erchick, Will Cullen Hart, John Fernandes, Hannah Jones, Jeff Mangum, and Derek Almstead.

McIntosh toured with Gnarls Barkley in 2008 as their bass player and later the same year played bass and cello on Lil Wayne's tour.

In 2009, Heather contributed cello to the tracks "Graze" and "Bleed" on Animal Collective's Fall Be Kind EP.

== Discography ==
=== Albums ===
- Billions of Phonographs (Orange Twin Records, 2003)
- Cast a Half Shadow (Orange Twin Records, 2006)
- Dark Småland (Orange Twin Records, 2008)
