= Jacob Norris =

Jacob Norris may refer to:

- Jacob Norris (rugby union), New Zealand rugby union player
- A character in BioShock 2#Multiplayer
