= Seniors and Juniors Strikes Back =

Studio album by Marshmallow Coast
- Released: March 1, 2011
- Genre: Pop Rock Indie-Rock Indie-Pop Neo-Psychedelia
- Length: 35:34
- Label: Happy Happy Birthday To Me Records

Marshmallow Coast chronology
Phreak Phantasy (2009)	Seniors and Juniors Strikes Back (2011)	Vangelis Rides Again (2015)

Seniors and Juniors Strikes Back is the eighth album by Marshmallow Coast.

== Track listing ==
Track listing:-

Professional ratings
Review scores
Source	Rating
All Music	4/5 stars

No.	Title	Length
1.	"Off To School"	02:55
2.	"Mashed Potato Light"	03:33
3.	"Wicked Jeans"	02:51
4.	"Lil' Pythagoras"	05:05
5.	"Broken Comb"	02:57
6.	"Ancient Chinese Secret"	02:16
7.	"Livin' In The Shadows"	03:23
8.	"Creative Writing"	04:12
9.	"Home From Schoolio"	02:45
10.	"Super Seniors & Juniors"	07:37
Total length:		35:34
