= Marshmallow Coast =

American indie pop band

- Genres: Indie rock
- Years active: 1996-Present
- Labels: Happy Happy Birthday To Me Records; Kindercore Records; Spare Me Records; Pickled Egg Records; Misra Records
- Members: Andy Gonzales; Derek Almstead; Sara Kirkpatrick; Jim Hix; Steven Trimmer

Marshmallow Coast (also formerly known as M Coast), is an indie pop band associated with the Elephant Six Collective.

== Background ==
Marshmallow Coast began in 1996 in Denver, Colorado, with a self-released cassette recorded by singer/songwriter Andy Gonzales when he was 18, which featured contributions from Joel Richardson. Gonzales then recorded Timesquare with Julian Koster in 1997, although it was released in 2000.

Gonzales dropped the project briefly to tour with the Music Tapes, and relocated to Athens, GA in 1998. In Athens, Gonzales met Kevin Barnes and Derek Almstead. With Barnes, Gonzales recorded Marshmallow Coast's debut LP Seniors & Juniors, released in 1999. Gonzales joined of Montreal that same year.

The next two albums, Marshmallow Coasting and Ride the Lightning were produced by Almstead. Gonzales then recorded Antistar with Sarah KirkPatrick, which was produced by Jason NeSmith and released in 2003.

In 2005, Gonzales announced the project would show same changes as Almstead began to contribute to songwriting. Emily Growden and Carlton Owens joined the group, and the name was changed to M Coast. A new album entitled Say It in Slang was released on HHBTM Records in 2006. In November 2007, it was announced the group had parted ways. Gonzales reverted the name back to Marshmallow Coast.

Marshmallow Coast returned in 2009 with the release of Phreak Phantasy on HHBTM.

Seniors and Juniors Strikes Back was released on HHBTM in March 2011. The album is a re-recording of the group's 1999 album, Seniors and Juniors, with the addition of a few new tracks.

== Discography ==
=== Albums ===
- Seniors & Juniors (CD) - Kindercore Records - 1999
- Timesquare (CD) - Spare Me Records - 2000
- Seniors & Juniors (CD/LP) - Pickled Egg Records - 2000
- Marshmallow Coasting (CD) - Kindercore Records - 2000
- Ride the Lightning (CD) - Quattro/Misra Records/Pickled Egg Records - 2001
- AntiStar (CD) - Misra Records - 2003
- Bizarre Classical Volume 1 (CD-R) - Self Released - 2006
- Say It in Slang (CD) - Happy Happy Birthday to Me - 2006
- Phreak Phantasy (CD) - Happy Happy Birthday to Me - 2009
- Seniors and Juniors Strikes Back (CD) - Happy Happy Birthday to Me - 2011
- Vangelis Rides Again (CD) - Happy Happy Birthday to Me - 2015
- Memory Girl (LP) - Happy Happy Birthday to Me - 2018

=== Singles and EPs ===
- Marshmallow Coast (cassette) - Fuzzy Aloof - 1996
- "I'm a Big Kid Now" (split single w/Midget and Hairs) (7") - Fuzzy Aloof - 1996
- "Scent of Credibility" (7") Spare Me Records/Fuzzy Aloof - 1997
- Happy Happy Birthday to Me singles club: October (7") - HHBTM - 1999
- Kindercore singles club: January (split single w/My First Keyboard) (7") Kindercore Records - 2000
- "Archibald Of The Balding Sparrows" (split w/Of Montreal) (7") Kindercore Records - 2000
