= Spare Me Records =

Record label in Williamsburg, New York

Spare Me Records was an independent record label based in Williamsburg, New York, active between 1996 and 2002. It specialized in supporting and internationally releasing albums by local (i.e., New York) talent, but released work by non-locals, as well.

Spare Me released music by such artists as M Coast, Pumpernickel, Gem w/Jenny Mae, Sinkcharmer, Bevis Frond, The Original Sins, Swearing at Motorists, Espadrille, and The Gerbils. It also released the As Seen on TV compilation album.

== See also ==
- List of record labels
