= Hannah M. Jones =

American drummer

Hannah M. Jones is an artist and musician from Athens, Georgia. Born in Par, England, Hannah grew up in Sandersville, Georgia, and later attended art school at the University of Georgia in Athens, Georgia. Past member of Elephant Six Collective band The Circulatory System, as well as The Instruments, she now focuses her attention on her songwriting project The New Sound of Numbers (called Sound Houses briefly) as a vocalist/12-string guitarist/drummer, and is drummer/vocalist for Supercluster (band). Orange Twin Records released her band Mind Brains self-titled album in 2015. Her work has been included on releases by Bill Laswell, Casper & the Cookies, and the compilation Aux Vol. 1.

== Discography ==
The New Sound of Numbers

- Liberty Seeds (2006)
- Invisible Magnetic (2013)

Supercluster (band)

- Special 5 e.p. (2007)
- Waves CD (2009), Cloud Recordings/Studio Mouse Productions
- "I Got The Answer/Sunflower Clock" 7-inch limited-edition single (2009), Cloud Recordings/ Studio Mouse Productions
- "Paris Effect/Neat in the Street" 7-inch limited-edition single (2011), Cloud Recordings/Studio Mouse Productions
- "Things We Used To Drink/Memory Of The Future" 7-inch limited-edition single (2012), Studio Mouse Productions

MInd Brains (band)

- Mind Brains CD/LP (2015), Orange Twin Records

== Video ==
- Too Many Eights (2007), Supercluster, from CDR EP: Special 5
- I Got the Answer (2009), Supercluster, from: CD Waves, Studio Mouse Productions/Cloud Recordings
- Neat In The Street (2011), Supercluster, from: single Paris Effect/Neat In The Street, Studio Mouse Productions/Cloud Recordings. Written by The Side Effects (Butchart/Ellison/Swartz), 1980.
- Memory Of The Future (2012), Supercluster, from: single Things We Used To Drink/Memory Of The Future, Studio Mouse Productions. Directed by Hana Hay and Hannah Jones from artwork by Hannah Jones.
