= Roxanne Martin =

Canadian illustrator

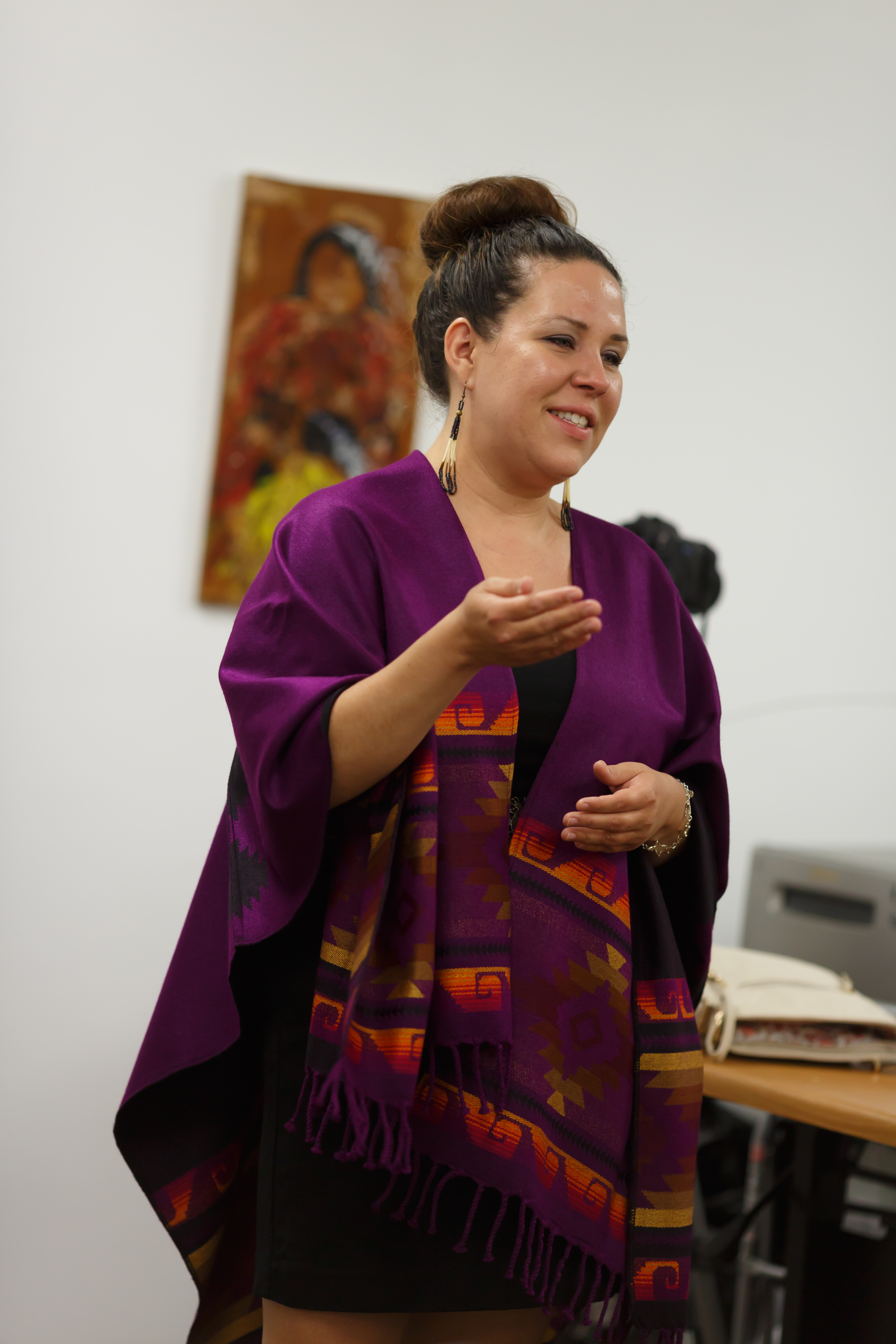
- Roxanne Martin at her art exhibition in the Shingwauk Residential Schools Centre
- Known for: Visual Artist, Educator, Author
- Website: roxannemartin.weebly.com

Roxanne Martin / Bezhik Anungo Kwe (One Star Woman) is an Anishinaabe artist, educator, author, jingle-dress dancer, LGTBQA2+ activist and small-business entrepreneur. She is the niece and goddaughter of artist Cecil Youngfox. Roxanne is from Wiikwemkoong First Nation and Serpent River First Nation, she is of the Eagle clan.

== Career ==
Martin was educated in Theatre Arts Production at Cambrian College in Sudbury, Ontario. She holds a BFA from Algoma University and a B.Ed. from the Schulich School of Education at Nipissing University.

She has been heavily involved in Ojibwa language preservation through her series of children's books Baby WayNa made for infants to the age of five.

Beginning in 2015 Martin began working with the Teach for Canada program, she currently has taught kindergarten to grade 6 in Lac Seul, Eagle Lake and Wabigoon First Nations.

== Work ==
=== Exhibitions ===
- 'Maamaandaawinam,' "She has a vision", at 180 Projects Gallery in Sault Ste. Marie, March 28 – 31, 2013
- Youth Solidarity Exhibition, Art Gallery of Ontario, June 22 - November 15, 2014

=== Awards and nominations ===
- Michaelle Jean Foundation Youth Solidarity Award Recipient 2014
