= The Late Music =

The Late Music Volume One

Studio album by Black Swan Network
- Released: 17 July 1997
- Genre: indie rock, ambient music
- Length: 60:58
- Label: Camera Obscura

The Late Music Volume One is an album by The Olivia Tremor Control side project Black Swan Network. Released on Camera Obscura, it is a collection of tracks inspired by Olivia Tremor Control fans who wrote the band with descriptions of dreams they had.

== Track listing ==
1. "One" – 4:21
2. "Two" – 5:47
3. "Three" – 2:31
4. "Four" – 4:26
5. "Five" – 16:34
6. "Six" – 17:43
7. "Seven" – 9:36
