= Pipes You See, Pipes You Don't =

Pipes You See, Pipes You Don't is a project of The Olivia Tremor Control keyboardist Peter Erchick. Conceived in the early 1990s, their first album was not released until July 2001. The band's name may be from a chapter in a children's encyclopedia. When the members of the Olivia Tremor Control split into their various projects following the release of their Black Foliage album, Erchick submitted a track to a Jandek tribute compilation under this name.

In 2001, Erchick released the first album of this project, Individualized Shirts, originally on Cloud Recordings. A United States tour in 2002 with Circulatory System followed, along with a self-released tour album called Special Fanfare for Anything. Orange Twin Recordings re-released Individualized Shirts in 2003.

In 2011, they revealed the album "Lost in the Pancakes."

== Releases ==
- Individualized Shirts (CD) – Cloud Recordings/Orange Twin – 2001
- Special Fanfare for Anything (CD) – Self-released – 2003
- Lost in the Pancakes (CD) – Cloud Recordings – 2011
