= Orquesta típica =

Term for popular music bands

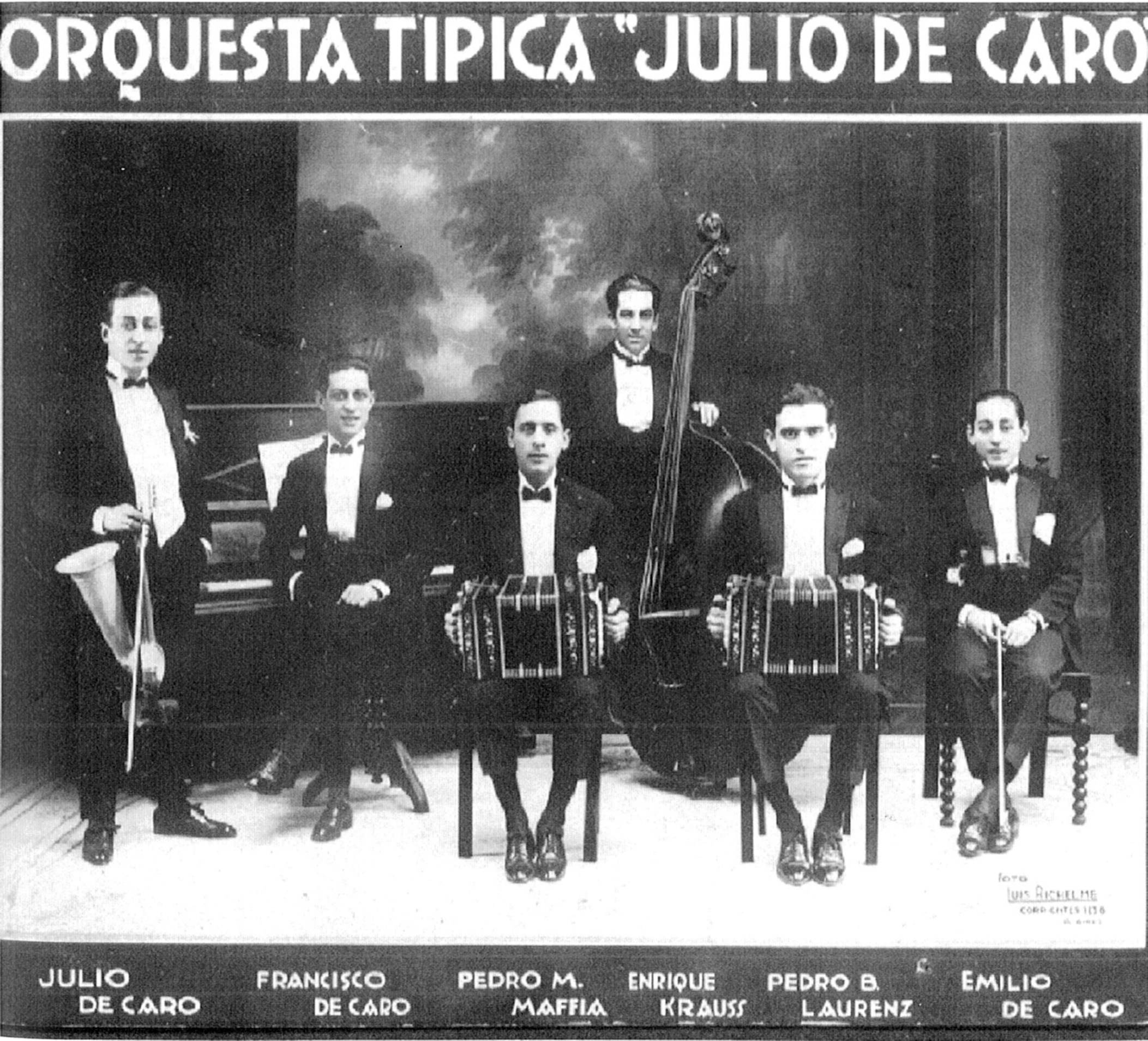
The Orquesta típica "Julio de Caro" from Argentina.

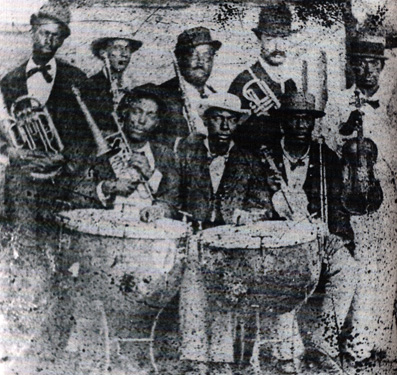
Orq. La Flor de Cuba, possibly the earliest surviving photograph of a Cuban popular band.

Orquesta típica, or simply a típica, is a Latin American term for a band which plays popular music. The details vary from country to country. The term tends to be used for groups of medium size (about 8 to 12 musicians) in some well-defined instrumental set-up.

== Argentina and Uruguay ==
In Argentina and Uruguay, the term orquesta típica is associated with tango music. The orquesta típica usually comprises a string section (three or four violins, and sometimes viola and cello), three or more bandoneons, and a rhythm section (piano and double bass). An orquesta típica is an expanded version of a sexteto típico, which includes 2 bandoneons, 2 violins, double bass and piano.

== Cuba ==
In Cuba, a típica is an ensemble mainly composed of wind instruments, which was very popular in the mid-19th century. One of the earliest, Orquesta Flor de Cuba, had the following make-up: cornet, trombone, figle (ophicleide), two clarinets, two violins, double bass, kettle drum, and güiro. The ophicleide was a sort of bass bugle with keys, invented in 1817, now superseded by the tuba and/or baritone horn, the name surviving for a pipe organ stop; the trombone would be more typically a valved rather than a slide instrument.

In the early 20th century, there were still several popular orquestas típicas, such as those directed by Enrique Peña and Félix González. In 1915, charangas began to replace orquestas típica, a process which was largely complete by 1925. Charangas would become, along with son conjuntos and Cuban-style big bands, one of the main precursors of the salsa ensemble, which is characterized by the inclusion of multiple trombones. Salsa ensembles can also feature trumpets along with piano, double bass, güiro, conga and bongó. In the salsa context, the term típico usually refers to the sound of the conjuntos of the 1940s, such as Arsenio Rodríguez's, or to those of the original charangas danzoneras (charangas típicas), such as Arcaño y sus Maravillas, since orquestas típicas never reached the United States.

== Orquestas Típicas of Argentina ==
- Juan D´Arienzo
- Ángel D’Agostino
- Alfredo de Ángelis
- José Basso
- Miguel Caló
- Alfredo Gobbi
- Mariano Mores
- Francini-Pontier
- Carlos Figari
- Osmar Maderna
- Osvaldo Pugliese
- Carlos Di Sarli
- Héctor Stamponi
- Ricardo Tanturi
- Aníbal Troilo
- Héctor Varela
- Orquesta Típica Santiagueña
- Orquesta Típica Fernández Fierro
- Orquesta Típica Ciudad Baigón
- Horacio Salgán
- Osvaldo Fresedo

== Orquestas Típicas of Uruguay ==
- Francisco Canaro
- Juan Canaro
- Juan Cao
- Minotto Di Cicco
- Típica Jaurena
- Luis Caruso
- Rogelio Coll
- Roberto Cuenca
- J. A. Espíndola
- Panchito Maqueira
- Facu Bonari
- Don Horacio
- Hugo Di Carlo
- Romeo Gavioli
- Mouro y Maqueira
- Walter Méndez
- Puglia - Pedroso
- Donato Raciatti "Tipica Sondor"
- Miguel Villasboas
- Nelson Alberti "A lo Darienzo"
- Matos Rodríguez

== Orquestas Típicas of United States ==
- Laura Camacho

== See also ==
- Music of Latin America
- Music of Argentina
- Music of Cuba
- Music of Uruguay
