= Individualized Shirts =

Studio album by Pipes You See, Pipes You Don't
- Released: July 4, 2001
- Recorded: ???
- Genre: Indie pop
- Length: 38:22
- Label: Orange Twin
- Producer: Brooks Robinson

Pipes You See, Pipes You Don't chronology
| Individualized Shirts (2001) | Special Fanfare for Anything (2002) |

Professional ratings
Review scores
| Source | Rating |
|---|---|
| Allmusic | link |
| UNCUT | 4/5 link |

Individualized Shirts is the first full-length album released by Pipes You See, Pipes You Don't of Elephant 6.

== Track listing ==
All songs by Peter Erchick except where noted.

1. "Ten Thousand Years Old" – 4:00
2. "If I Leave Tomorrow" – 2:04
3. "Do Be Day" – :27
4. "Karaoke Free" – 4:09
5. "Pipes You See, Pipes You Don't" – 1:12
6. "I Am Instead" – 3:50
7. "Big Giant" – 2:25
8. "Million Pieces" – 3:24
9. "Moon River" – 2:17
  - Henry Mancini/Johnny Mercer
10. "Me and Bob" – 1:42
11. "Sleep Come Easy" – 3:38
12. "I Stopped With Victor Crowell To Feed The Ducks" – 3:45
13. "Pueblo" – 5:28
