= Black Swan Network =

The Black Swan Network is a musical side project of the Olivia Tremor Control. With contributions from Neutral Milk Hotel members Jeff Mangum and Julian Koster, as well as individual contributions from J. Kirk Pleasant of Calvin, Don't Jump! and fablefactory's Roxanne Martin, it was intended to be an experimental project in ambient music. After their releases, the band members became busier with their other projects, and Black Swan Network appears to be on permanent hiatus.

== Releases ==
Black Swan Network released one full-length album on Camera Obscura and one EP, in addition to the eponymous album described as a collaboration with the Olivia Tremor Control.

The full-length album, The Late Music, was partially born out of a small message hidden in the liner notes of the Olivia Tremor Control's Music from the Unrealized Film Script, Dusk at Cubist Castle, requesting that people submit recordings of dream descriptions to the band. The album consisted of seven untitled pieces, some of which incorporated the submissions.

=== Albums ===
- The Late Music (Camera Obscura; CD; 1997)
- The Olivia Tremor Control/Black Swan Network (Flydaddy; CD/LP; 1997)

=== Singles and EPs ===
- Happy Happy Birthday to Me Singles Club: June (Happy Happy Birthday to Me; 7"; 2001)
