= Mosaics Within Mosaics =

Mosaics within Mosaics

Studio album by Circulatory System
- Released: June 24, 2014
- Genres: Psychedelic rock, psychedelic pop
- Length: 59:56
- Label: Cloud Recordings

Circulatory System chronology
Side 3 (2009)	Mosaics within Mosaics (2014)

Professional ratings
Aggregate scores
Source	Rating
Metacritic	74/100 link
Review scores
Source	Rating
Pitchfork Media	7.9/10 review
Rolling Stone	3.5/5 review

Mosaics within Mosaics is the third album released by Circulatory System. It is their second double album and was released on June 24, 2014.

== Track listing ==
No.	Title	Length
1.	"Physical Mirage/Visible Magic"
2.	"If You Think About It Now"
3.	"No Risk"
4.	"Just In Time To See You All"
5.	"Neon Light"
6.	"It's Love"
7.	"Mosaic #1"
8.	"Tiny Planes on Canvas"
9.	"Mosaic #2"
10.	"When You're Small"
11.	"Do You Know What's Real?"
12.	"Over Dinner the Cardinal Spoke"
13.	"Aerial View of a Heart (From Above)"
14.	"There Is No Time but Now"
15.	"Puffs of Cotton"
16.	"The Reasons Before You Knew"
17.	"Mosaic #3"
18.	"Mosaics Within Mosaics"
19.	"Mosaic #4"
20.	"Open Up Your Lives"
21.	"Mosaic #5"
22.	"Sounds That You've Never Heard"
23.	"Stars and Molecules"
24.	"Mosaic #6"
25.	"Mosaic #7"
26.	"Makes No Sense"
27.	"Conclusions"
28.	"Mosaic #8"
29.	"Bakery Spires"
30.	"Night Falls"
31.	"Elastic Empire Coronation"
