= Derek Almstead =

American musician

Derek Almstead (born August 23, 1974) is an American musician and engineer closely tied to The Elephant Six Collective.

== Background ==
Born in Lexington, Virginia, he spent his childhood in Tishomingo, Oklahoma, and later Manassas, Virginia. In 1995 he moved to Athens, Georgia, where he became involved with Elephant 6. A multi-instrumentalist, Almstead also writes, records, engineers, and masters music from his own Pixel Studio.

== Portfolio ==
Almstead is perhaps best known as a bass player. He has played or currently plays with the following bands: Of Montreal (on drums and bass), Destroyer, Summer Hymns, Visitations, Great Lakes, The Sunshine Fix, Polaris, Mary Jane, The Genius Test, Marshmallow Coast, Daisy, The Imperial Teeth, Major Organ and the Adding Machine, Pipes You See, Pipes You Don't, Circulatory System, The Instruments, M Coast, The 63 Crayons, Vic Chesnutt, Elf Power, E6 Holiday Surprise Orchestra, Space Trucks, The Olivia Tremor Control, the Glands, The Ladybug Transistor, and Giant Day. He released his solo project, Faster Circuits - Tunes of Glory, on June 25, 2013. He also helped record and produce The Sleeping Flies (Electronic Watusi Boogaloo / Ultra Wide Band) with The Bill Doss for Kindercore in Athens

== Personal ==
He was married in 2005 to Emily Growden, also of Marshmallow Coast and Giant Day.
