= Cloud Recordings =

- Founded: 2001
- Genre: Experimental rock, jazz, indie rock
- Country of origin: United States
- Official website: www.cloudrecordings.com

Cloud Recordings is an American record label founded in 2001 by John Fernandes and Will Cullen Hart.

== List of artists on Cloud Recordings ==
- Aural Oceans
- Azalia Snail
- Black Swan Network
- Ezra Buchla/Todd Rush/Jacob Sunderlin
- Circulatory System
- Cult of Riggonia
- Dark Meat
- Dhana Jeera
- Bill Doss/John Kiran Fernandes/Brent Van Daley
- Dream Boat
- Faster Circuits
- John Fernandes
- The John Kiran Fernandes and David McCoy Ambient Duo
- John Kiran Fernandes and Shane Parish
- French Exit (band)
- W. Cullen Hart
- A Hawk and a Hacksaw
- Honeypuppy
- Icy Demons
- Immaterial Possession
- Jardin botanique + John Kiran Fernandes
- Lavender Holyfield
- Michael G. Maxwell
- Jacob Morris
- Nesey Gallons
- The New Sound of Numbers
- Nim
- Old Smokey
- The Olivia Tremor Control
- The Olivia Tremor Control/Black Swan Network
- Organically Programmed
- Pipes You See, Pipes You Don't.
- The Rishis
- Robert Schneider
- Sock the Monkey
- Supercluster
- Super Crayon
- Tall Dwarfs
- Telemarket
- TV Dinner
- Austyn Wohlers
