= Circulatory System (band) =

American psychedelic rock band

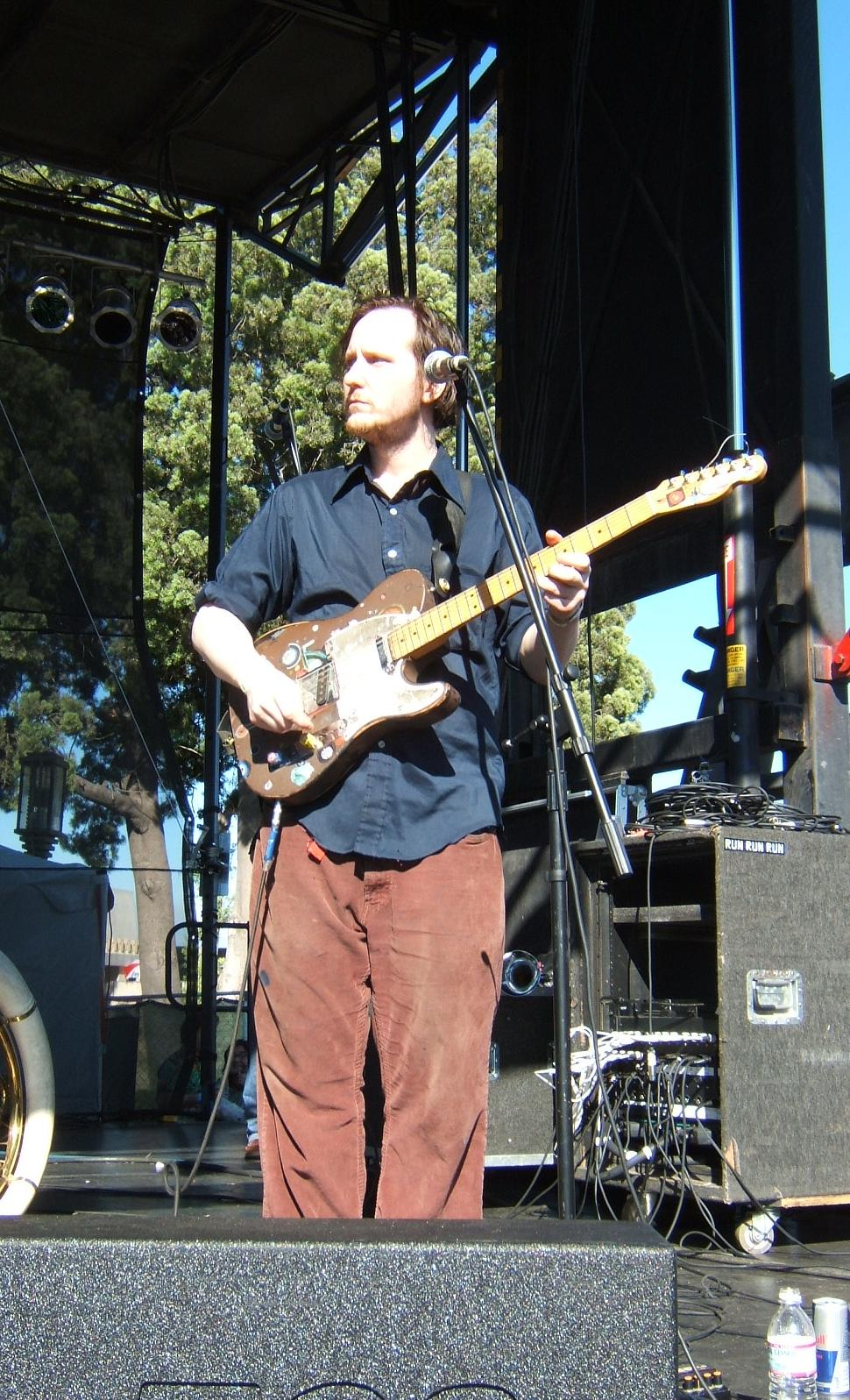
- Will Cullen Hart, founder of Circulatory System, soundchecking at ArthurFest 2005

Background information
- Origin: Athens, Georgia, US
- Genres: Indie rock, psychedelic pop, folk
- Years active: 2000–present
- Label: Cloud
- Members: John Fernandes; Peter Erchick; Derek Almstead; A.J. Griffin
- Past members: Will Cullen Hart; Hannah M. Jones; Philip Brown; Jeff Mangum; Nesey Gallons; Heather McIntosh; Charlie Johnston; Suzanne Allison

Circulatory System is a psychedelic rock musical ensemble formed by musician/painter Will Cullen Hart, and featuring Derek Almstead, Suzanne Allison, Peter Erchick, John Fernandes, Charlie Johnston, and Heather McIntosh.

Hart, part of the Elephant Six Collective, was one of the lead players in the Olivia Tremor Control. After that group disbanded in 2000, he and most of the other former Olivias, with the exception of Bill Doss (who was focusing on his solo project Sunshine Fix), and Eric Harris, formed Circulatory System. Neutral Milk Hotel's Jeff Mangum also contributed to their albums, but was only briefly part of the touring version of the band.

Their third full-length album, Mosaics within Mosaics, was released on June 24, 2014.

Hart died on November 29, 2024, aged 53.

== Discography ==
- Circulatory System (2001, Cloud Recordings)
- Inside Views (2001, Cloud Recordings)
- Signal Morning (2009, Cloud Recordings)
- Side 3 (2010, Cloud Recordings)
- Mosaics Within Mosaics (2014, Cloud Recordings)

Compilation appearances

The band also released the track "Deserts (As Big as a Star)" on the benefit album The Amos House Collection Volume III on Wishing Tree Records.
