= The Music Tapes =

Experimental pop music and performance art project

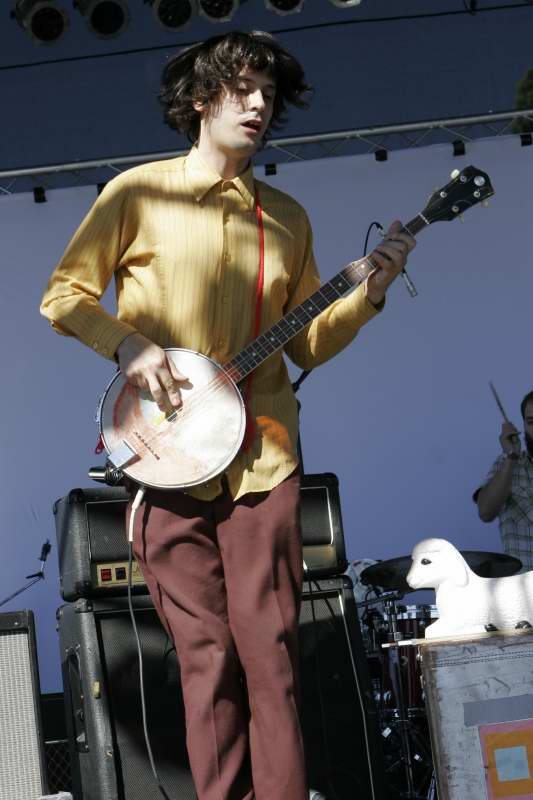
- Julian Koster of the Music Tapes

Background information
- Origin: United States
- Genres: Indie, experimental, psychedelic rock
- Labels: Merge, Elephant 6
- Members: Julian Koster; Robbie Cucchiaro; Thomas Hughes; Albert Birney; Andy Gonzales; Andy Lauer; Ian Ludders
- Past members: Jeremy Barnes; Nesey Gallons

The Music Tapes is an experimental pop music and performance art project of Elephant 6 member Julian Koster (also of Neutral Milk Hotel). The Music Tapes is characterized by unusual orchestrations (such as singing saw and bowed banjo), the use of musique concrète and narrative storytelling, vintage home-recording practices, and musical inventions (like the 7-foot Tall Metronome and Static the Singing Television). They are also known for their unique live performances, such as the Caroling and Lullaby tours that bring them into the homes of fans, and theatrical shows like The Traveling Imaginary, which takes place in a circus tent.

== History ==
=== Origins and the 1st Imaginary Symphony for Nomad ===
The Music Tapes started life as a creative outlet for the 16-year-old Koster, who would create tapes of songs and stories, as means of escapism, which he would share with his friends, culminating in 'The American Phoam Rubber Co. Symphony Orchestra Proudly Presents the 2nd Silly Putty Symphony for Edison Wax Cylinder', which was essentially tape collages. In 1989, Koster formed the band Chocolate U.S.A., a more conventional indie pop band, which also included Bill Doss and Eric Harris, later (along with Koster, though somewhat unofficially) members of The Olivia Tremor Control. The band released two full albums, All Jets Are Gonna Fall Today and Smoke Machine, before splitting in 1994, after which Koster chose to focus his creative efforts on the Music Tapes once more.

To date, the Music Tapes have released three proper full albums. The first, 1st Imaginary Symphony For Nomad came out in 1999. A partial concept record, among its themes are the power of television, and the death of 1950s actor George Reeves, who played the superhero Superman, who Koster was entranced with as a child. The album took many years to assemble, being recorded in closets and cupboards, and mixing straightforward pop songs with collage and storytelling. Its release was followed by the "House Capsule Tour" in which Julian was joined by fellow Music Tapes members Robbie Cucchiaro and Eric Harris.

The Music Tapes also released three 7-inch records during this time-Please Hear Mr. Flight Control, The Television Tells Us (which both pre-date 1st Imaginary Symphony For Nomad), as well as a split 7-inch entitled The Music Tapes and Dad, with Dennis Koster, Julian's father and a renowned flamenco guitarist.

=== Music Tapes for Clouds and Tornadoes and The Singing Saw at Christmastime ===
The Music Tapes were quiet for a number of years before Music Tapes For Clouds and Tornadoes was released on August 19, 2008, via Merge Records. It contained 14 songs, two with videos. Some of these songs existed back around the time of 1st Imaginary Symphony for Nomad.

The Music Tapes played Athens Popfest 2008 and participated in the Elephant 6 Holiday Surprise Tour that fall, which was organized by Koster himself. In the winter, Julian Koster performed some Music Tapes songs on a caroling tour (see Julian Koster for more information). Merge also released The Singing Saw at Christmastime on October 7. The album featured 12 Christmas songs performed on singing saw and was released under Julian Koster's name rather than The Music Tapes.

=== Mary's Voice and the Traveling Imaginary ===
Following Music Tapes For Clouds and Tornadoes, the band began work on a tripartite "Third Imaginary Symphony", announcing that "Mary's Voice" would be the first of the three albums. The album was preceded in 2011 by Purim's Shadows (The Dark Tours the World), an EP including the single "Nantasket". The band was chosen by Jeff Mangum of Neutral Milk Hotel to perform at the All Tomorrow's Parties festival that he curated in March 2012 in Minehead, England. Merge released Mary's Voice on September 4, 2012. According to Koster, the album was written and recorded in a carnival tent. Koster brought a larger version of said tent, the Traveling Imaginary, on the road for performances beginning in the winter of 2012-2013. The Traveling Imaginary is said to be the first incarnation of a series of larger-scale Music Tapes projects undertaken by the Orbiting Human Circus, a newly official artistic foundation led by Koster as Artistic Director.

The band's album The 2nd Imaginary Symphony for Cloudmaking, a story album consisting of the story of a boy named Nigh who lives with his grandmother who is blind, was completed in 2001. but not officially released for over a decade. Upon its completion the album was put through two CD-R circulations and played on WNYC's Spinning on Air, but had yet to see an official release until 15 years later. The album features instrumentation by Koster to back the spoken word recording by Brian Dewan. It was eventually released in July 2017 through Koster's podcast The Orbiting Human Circus (of the Air).

On November 17, 2023, the album Quartet Plus Two was released by a new band fronted by Koster, also called Orbiting Human Circus. While ostensibly a new project, the album featured heavy contributions from both Cucchiaro and Hughes.

=== Future projects ===
As Mary's Voice is said to be the first of three albums comprising the "Third Imaginary Symphony", further albums from the series are anticipated. Another long-rumored record is the as-yet-untitled 'singing saw symphony' with Julian's father on flamenco guitar, though this has yet to see the light of day, and is under slow progress. Lastly, though certainly not least, is a film project, for which Julian was working with director John Cameron Mitchell, known for his film Hedwig and the Angry Inch. The film was set to be an animation, with music by Koster, which is also about the boy named Nigh, although not many other details are known. All of these projects have been in the works since the late 1990s, and it is currently unknown whether any will be officially released. Mitchell, who has since worked on several other projects, later collaborated with Koster as a cast member on his Orbiting Human Circus narrative podcast.

=== Sexual assault allegations ===
On July 9, 2024, Koster was accused by fellow Elephant 6 musician Nesey Gallons of grooming and sexually assaulting them between 2001 and 2005, beginning when Gallons was fifteen years old. Koster would have been twenty-nine years old at the time the allegations began. Gallons alleged that the grooming allegations began via email contact when Gallons was fifteen years old and turned physical in April 2001 when Gallons was still sixteen. Gallons further alleges that Koster sexually assaulted them twice in the summer of 2005.. In a now deleted Instagram post Koster denied the sexual assault allegations.

== Discography ==
=== Albums ===
- 1st Imaginary Symphony For Nomad (Merge; CD/LP; 1999)
- The 2nd Imaginary Symphony for Cloudmaking (CD; recorded 2002, released 2017)
- Music Tapes for Clouds and Tornadoes (Merge; CD/LP; 2008)
- The Singing Saw at Christmastime (as Julian Koster) (Merge; CD/LP; 2008)
- Mary's Voice (Merge; CD/LP; 2012)

=== EPs ===
- Purim's Shadows (The Dark Tours the World) (Merge; MP3/FLAC/Kazoo; 2011)
- The Orbiting Human Circus (Merge; MP3; 2017)

=== Singles ===
- Please Hear Mr. Flight Control (Elephant Six; 7-inch; 1997)
- The Television Tells Us (Elephant Six; 7-inch; 1998)
- The Music Tapes and Dad (Given free with 'Stop Smiling Magazine' No. 8; 7-inch; 2000)
- For the Planet Pluto; 2009
- The Sea of Tranquility (Merge; MP3/FLAC; 2019)
- Laughs Last Laughed; 2020

=== Compilation appearances ===
The band also submitted a version of "All Tomorrow's Parties" to the Victor compilation album Rabid Chords 002: Tribute to the Velvet Underground, released in 2000
