= Musical saw =

Hand saw used as a musical instrument

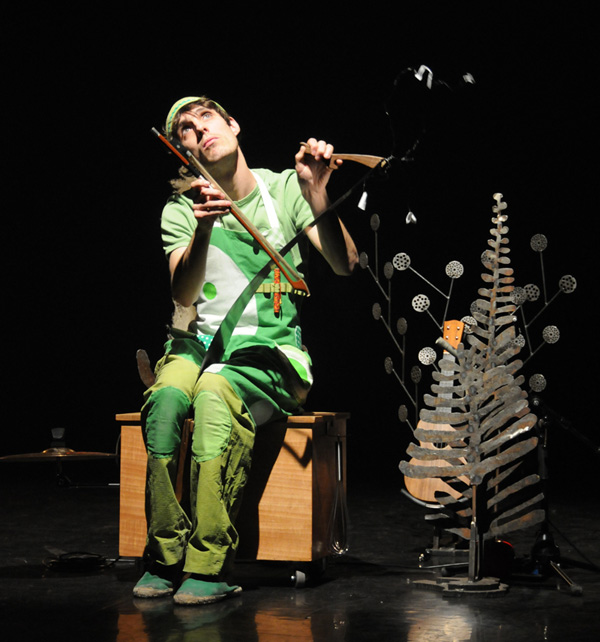
- A musical saw being played.

Other instrument
- Other names: Saw; singing saw
- Classification: Idiophone
- Hornbostel–Sachs classification: 132.1 (Friction idiophone with individual plaque)
- Timbre: Somewhat like the human voice

Related instruments
- Daxophone; Nail violin

Sound sample

A musical saw, also called a singing saw, is a hand saw used as a musical instrument. Capable of continuous glissando (portamento), the sound creates an ethereal tone, very similar to the theremin. The musical saw is classified as a plaque friction idiophone with direct friction (132.1) under the Hornbostel-Sachs system of musical instrument classification and as a metal sheet played by friction (151) under the revision of the Hornbostel-Sachs classification by the MIMO Consortium.

== Playing ==
[The musical saw is] a flexible handsaw played by holding the handle between the knees and bending the blade while bowing along the flat edge. The musical saw is found in the folk music of Russia and rural America, and is a popular vaudeville instrument.

The saw is generally played while seated, with the handle, called a tip-handle or cheat, squeezed between the legs and the far end held with one hand. Some sawists play standing, either with the handle between the knees and the blade sticking out in front of them. The saw is usually played with the serrated edge, or "teeth," facing the body, though some players face them away. Some saw players file down the teeth, which makes no discernable difference to the sound. Many – especially professional – saw players use a cheat at the tip of the saw for easier bending and higher virtuosity.

To sound a note, a sawist first bends the blade into an S-curve. The parts of the blade that are curved are dampened from vibration and do not sound. At the center of the S-curve, a section of the blade remains relatively flat. This section, known as the "sweet spot," can vibrate across the blade's width, producing a distinct pitch: the wider the section of the blade, the lower the sound. Sound is usually produced by drawing a bow across the back edge of the saw at the sweet spot or, alternatively, by striking the sweet spot with a mallet.

The sawist controls the pitch by adjusting the S-curve, making the sweet spot travel up the blade (toward a thinner width) for a higher pitch or toward the handle for a lower pitch. Harmonics can be created by playing at varying distances on either side of the sweet spot. Sawists can add vibrato by shaking one of their legs or by wobbling the hand that holds the tip of the blade. Once a sound is produced, it will sustain for quite a while, and can be carried through several notes of a phrase.

On occasion the musical saw is called for in orchestral music, but orchestral percussionists are seldom also sawists. If a note outside of the saw's range is called for, an electric guitar with a slide can be substituted.

== Types ==
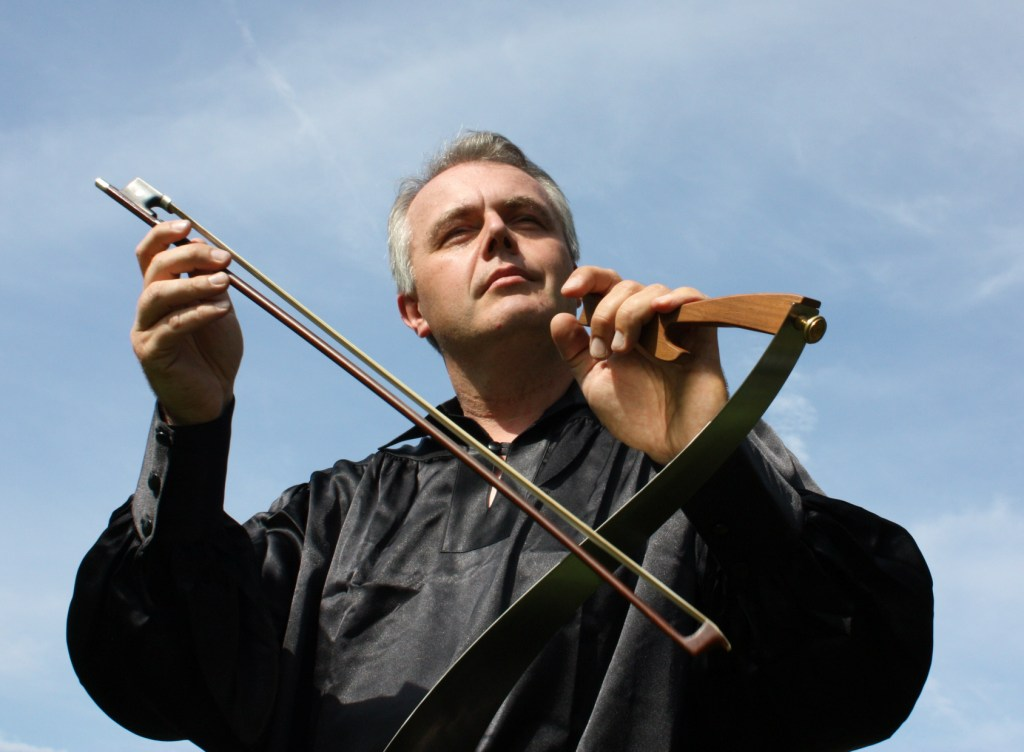
A musical saw, without teeth

Sawists often use standard wood-cutting saws, although special musical saws are also made. Compared to wood-cutting saws, musical saw blades are generally wider for range and longer for finer control. They do not have set or sharpened teeth, and they may have grain running parallel to the back edge of the saw, rather than parallel to the teeth. Some musical saws are made with thinner metal, to increase flexibility, while others are made thicker, for a richer tone, longer sustain, and stronger harmonics.

A typical musical saw is 5 inches (13 cm) wide at the handle end and 1 inch (2.5 cm) wide at the tip. Such a saw will generally produce about two octaves, regardless of its length. A bass saw may be over 6 inches (15 cm) at the handle and produce about two-and-a-half octaves. There are also musical saws with a 3–4 octave range, and new improvements have resulted in as much as a 5-octave note range. Two-person saws, also called "misery whips," can also be played, though with less virtuosity, and they produce an octave or less of range.

Most sawists use cello or violin bows, using violin rosin, but some may use improvised homemade bows, such as a wooden dowel, or strike the saw with a mallet.

== Producers ==
Musical saws have been produced for over a century, primarily in the United States, but also in Scandinavia, Germany, France (Lame sonore) and Asia.

=== United States ===
In the early 1900s, there were at least ten companies in the United States manufacturing musical saws. These saws ranged from familiar steel varieties to premium, gold-plated saws worth hundreds of dollars. However, with the start of World War II, the demand for metals made the manufacture of saws too expensive, and many of these companies went out of business. By the year 2000, only three companies in the United States – Mussehl & Westphal, Charlie Blacklock, and Wentworth – were making saws. In 2012, a company called Index Drums started producing a saw that had a built-in transducer in the handle, called the "JackSaw."

=== Outside the United States ===
Outside the United States, makers of musical saws include Bahco, makers of the limited edition Stradivarius, Alexis in France, Feldmann and Stövesandt in Germany, Music Blade in Greece; and Thomas Flinn & Company in the United Kingdom, based in Sheffield, who produce three different sized musical saws, as well as accessories.

== Events, championships and world records ==
The International Musical Saw Association (IMSA) produces an annual International Musical Saw Festival (including a "Saw-Off" competition) every August in Santa Cruz and Felton, California. An International Musical Saw Festival is held every other summer in New York City, produced by Natalia Paruz. Paruz also produced a musical saw festival in Israel. There are also annual saw festivals in Japan and China.

A Guinness World Record for the largest musical-saw ensemble was established July 18, 2009, at the annual NYC Musical Saw Festival. Organized by Paruz, 53 musical saw players performed together.

In 2011 a World Championship took place in Jelenia Góra, Poland. Winners: 1. Gladys Hulot (France), 2. Katharina Micada (Germany), 3. Tom Fink (Germany).

Caroline McCaskey became the first person to play the American national anthem with a saw at a Major League Baseball game (Oakland Athletics’ Coliseum) on June 6, 2022.

== Performers ==
People notable for playing the musical saw.

- Natalia Paruz, also known as the "Saw Lady," plays the musical saw in movie soundtracks, in television commercials, with orchestras internationally, and is the organizer of international musical saw festivals in New York City and Israel. She was a judge at the musical saw festival in France, and she played the saw in the off-Broadway show 'Sawbones.' The December 3, 2011, crossword puzzle of The Washington Post had Paruz as a question: Down 5 – Instrument played by Natalia Paruz.
- Mara Carlyle, a London-based singer/songwriter who often performs using the musical saw, and the instrument features on her albums The Lovely and Floreat.
- David Coulter, multi-instrumentalist, producer and music supervisor; ex-member of Test Dept and The Pogues, has played musical saw live, in films, on tv and stages around the world and on numerous albums with: Damon Albarn, Gorillaz, and Tom Waits, among others. He has played on many film scores, including Is Anybody There? (2008) and It's a Boy Girl Thing (2006), and has featured on TV soundtrack and themes tunes, most recently for Psychoville and episodes of Wallander.
- Janeen Rae Heller played the saw in four television guest appearances: The Tracey Ullman Show (1989), Quantum Leap (1990), and Home Improvement (1992 and 1999). She has also performed on albums such as Michael Hedges' The Road to Return in 1994 and Rickie Lee Jones's Ghostyhead in 1997.
- Mio Higashino, based in Osaka, won first place in the 42nd International Musical Saw Festival. Mio performs in Japan as part of the two-member group Mollen.
- Charles Hindmarsh, a.k.a. The Yorkshire Musical Saw Player, has played the musical saw throughout the UK.
- Kev Hopper, formerly the bass guitarist in the 1980s band Stump, made an EP titled Saurus in 2002 featuring six original saw tunes.
- Christine Johnston (under the stage name Eve Kransky) of The Kransky Sisters plays the musical saw alongside other traditional and improvised instruments.
- Brigid Kaelin, an American multi-instrumentalist/composer, features the saw in her performances and recordings, including two musical saw albums and many appearances playing the musical saw with Elvis Costello.
- Julian Koster of the band Neutral Milk Hotel played the singing saw, along with other instruments, in the band and also plays the saw in his solo project, The Music Tapes. In 2008, he released The Singing Saw at Christmastime. He also writes and co-directs the podcast The Orbiting Human Circus (of the Air) which prominently features singing saws in the story.
- Katharina Micada plays the musical saw on cabaret stages and with different symphony orchestras like Berlin Philharmonic Orchestra and London Philharmonic Orchestra. A singer, she is one of the few players who can sing and play the saw simultaneously and in pitch. She has played in TV and radio shows and for film and CD recordings.
- Jamie Muir of the progressive rock band King Crimson briefly uses a musical saw on the song "Easy Money" from the album Larks' Tongues in Aspic.
- Bonnie Paine, singer and multi-instrumentalist from Talequah, Oklahoma, and co-founder of Colorado folk-rock group Elephant Revival, has performed on the musical saw as a member of the band.
- Angela Perley and the Howlin' Moons, an American rock band from Columbus, Ohio, features singer/guitarist Angela Perley, who performs the musical saw on their recorded albums and at their live shows.
- Quinta (a.k.a. Kath Mann), a London-based multi-instrumentalist and composer, has collaborated with many artists on the musical saw, including Bat for Lashes, Radiohead's Philip Selway, and The Paper Cinema.
- Thomas Jefferson Scribner was a familiar figure on the streets of Santa Cruz, California, during the 1970s, playing the musical saw. He performed on a variety of recordings and appeared in folk music festivals in the United States and Canada during the 1970s. His work as a labor organizer and member of the Industrial Workers of the World is documented in the 1979 film The Wobblies. Canadian composer/saw player Robert Minden pays tribute to him on his website. Musician and songwriter Utah Phillips has recorded a song referencing Scribner, "The Saw Playing Musician," on the album Fellow Workers with Ani DiFranco. Artist Marghe McMahon was inspired in 1978 to create a bronze statue of Tom playing the musical saw, which sits in downtown Santa Cruz.
- Adrian Stout of The Tiger Lillies switches between theremin, musical saw, jaw harp, and a Greek bağlama.
- That 1 Guy, an American-based musician who performs using homemade instruments.
- Catherine Gerbrands has played saw and theremin for Jowe Head, Mediæval Bæbes, KatieJane Garside, David Lance Callahan and in her own band, Seven-Headed Raven.
- Jim Turner released The Well-Tempered Saw on Owl Records in 1971
- Victor Victoria (Victoria Falconer) of the musical cabaret troupe Fringe Wives Club and dark cabaret comedy duo EastEnd Cabaret plays the musical saw as part of their live shows, amongst other instruments.
- Liu Ya from China is a professional violinist and saw player and is famous for her interpretation of the "Bird Song," which she performed on Chinese TV.
- Ursula Knudson of the Los Angeles-based gypsy/Django/Balkan/rock music group Fishtank Ensemble (2004-2015) sang and played the musical saw at performances in the US and Europe, as well as on 6 CDs.

=== Marlene Dietrich ===
German actress and singer Marlene Dietrich, who lived and worked in the United States for a long time, is probably the most famous person who played the musical saw. When she studied the violin for one year in Weimar in her early twenties, her musical skills were already evident. Some years later she learned to play the musical saw while she was shooting the film Café Elektric in Vienna in 1927. Her colleague, the actor and musician Igo Sym, taught her how to play. In the shooting breaks and at weekends, both performed romantic duets, he at the piano and she at the musical saw.

Sym gave his saw to her as a farewell gift. The following words are engraved on the saw: "Now Suidy is gone / the sun d’ont [sic!] / shine… / Igo / Vienna 1927" She took the saw with her when she left for Hollywood in 1929 and played there in the following years at film sets and Hollywood parties. When she participated in the United Service Organizations (USO) shows for the US troops in 1944, she also played on the saw. Some of these shows were broadcast on radio, so there exist two rare recordings of her saw playing, embedded in entertaining interviews. 1. Aloha Oe 2. other song

=== In fiction ===
- In the 1940 animated film Pinocchio, Jiminy Cricket bounced on the saw during the song "Give a Little Whistle." The saw is whistling like the musical saw, whistling effects by Marion Darlington (1940).
- In the film Cabaret (1972), a man plays "Willkommen" on a musical saw in a nightclub.
- The theme song of the movie One Flew Over the Cuckoo's Nest is played on a musical saw.
- Delicatessen is directed by Jean-Pierre Jeunet and Marc Caro and includes a duet for violoncello and musical saw, which is performed on a roof (1991).
- Dummy, directed by Greg Pritikin and starring Adrien Brody, has an audition scene with a musical saw player (portrayed by Natalia Paruz) (2002).
- In 2002, an orchestra of 30 musical saws appeared in Nicholas de Mimsy-Porpington's five-hundredth Deathday Party in the Harry Potter and the Chamber of Secrets book.
- In the 2011 movie Another Earth, the character of the composer plays the saw (on the soundtrack is Natalia Paruz).
- In the 2014 animated film My Little Pony: Equestria Girls — Rainbow Rocks, one of the film's background characters, Derpy Hooves, plays the musical saw in her band.
- In the 2014 stop-motion animated film The Boxtrolls, one of the main Boxtrolls who took care of Eggs, Fish, plays the musical saw with Eggs in their cave.
- In the film Mr. Peabody & Sherman, Mr. Peabody plays a musical saw (2014).
- In the 8th episode of season 3 of the TV series Hilda, Victoria Van Gale is seen playing a musical saw in the tower in Fairy Country.

== Composers and compositions ==
Beginning in the early 1920s, composers of both contemporary and popular music wrote for the musical saw. One of the first was Franz Schreker who included the musical saw in his opera Christophorus (1925–29), where it is used in the séance scene of the second act. Other early examples include Dmitri Shostakovich: he included the musical saw, e.g., in the film music for The New Babylon (1929), in The Nose (1928), and in Lady Macbeth of the Mtsensk District (1934). Shostakovich and other composers of his time used the term "Flexaton" to mark the musical saw. "Flexaton" means "to flex a tone," in which the saw is flexed to change the pitch. There exists another instrument called Flexatone, so there has been confusion for a long time. Aram Khachaturian, who knew Shostakovich's music, included the musical saw in his Piano Concerto (1936) in the second movement. Another composer was the Swiss Arthur Honegger, who included the saw in his 1924 opera Antigone. The Romanian composer George Enescu used the musical saw at the end of the second act of his opera Œdipe (1931) to show in an extensive glissando – which begins with the mezzo-soprano and is continued by the saw – the death and ascension of the sphinx killed by Oedipus.

The Italian composer Giacinto Scelsi wrote a part for the saw in his quarter-tone piece Quattro pezzi per orchestra (1959). German composer Hans Werner Henze took the saw to characterize the mean hero of his tragical opera Elegy for young lovers (1961).

Other composers were Krysztof Penderecki with Fluorescences (1961), De natura sonoris Nr. 2 (1971) and the opera Ubu Rex (1990), Bernd Alois Zimmermann with Stille und Umkehr (1970), George Crumb with Ancient voices of children (1970), John Corigliano with The Mannheim Rocket (2001).

Composer Scott Munson wrote Clover Hill (2007) for saw and orchestra, Quintet for saw and strings (2009), The World Is Too Much with Us for soprano singer, saw and strings (2009), Ars longa vitas [sic] brevis for saw and string quartet (2010), 'Bend' for saw and string quartet (2011) many pieces for jazz band and saw (2010–2013), Lullaby for the Forgotten for saw and piano (2015), and many movie and theater scores containing the saw.

Chaya Czernowin used the saw in her opera "PNIMA...Ins Innere" (2000) to represent the character of the grandfather, who is traumatized by the Holocaust.

There are also Leif Segerstam, Hans Zender (orchestration of "5 préludes" by Claude Debussy), and Oscar Strasnoy (opera Le bal).

Russian composer Lera Auerbach wrote for the saw in her ballet The Little Mermaid (2005), in her symphonic poem Dreams and Whispers of Poseidon (2005), in her oratorio "Requiem Dresden – Ode to Peace" (2012), in her Piano Concerto No. 1 (2015), in her comic oratorio The Infant Minstrel and His Peculiar Menagerie (2016) and in her violin concerto Nr. 4 "NyX—Fractured Dreams" (2017).

Canadian composer Robert Minden has written extensively for the musical saw. Michael A. Levine composed Divination By Mirrors for musical saw soloist and two string ensembles tuned a quarter tone apart, taking advantage of the saw's ability to play in both tunings.

Other composers for chamber music with musical saw are Jonathan Rutherford (An Intake of Breath), Dana Wilson (Whispers from Another Time), Heinrich Gattermeyer (Elegie für Singende Säge, Cembalo (oder Klavier), Vito Zuraj (Musica di [sic] camera (2001)) and Britta-Maria Bernhard (Tranquillo).

== See also ==
- Flexatone
- Wobble board
- Daxophone
