= Spodomancy =

Divination using ashes

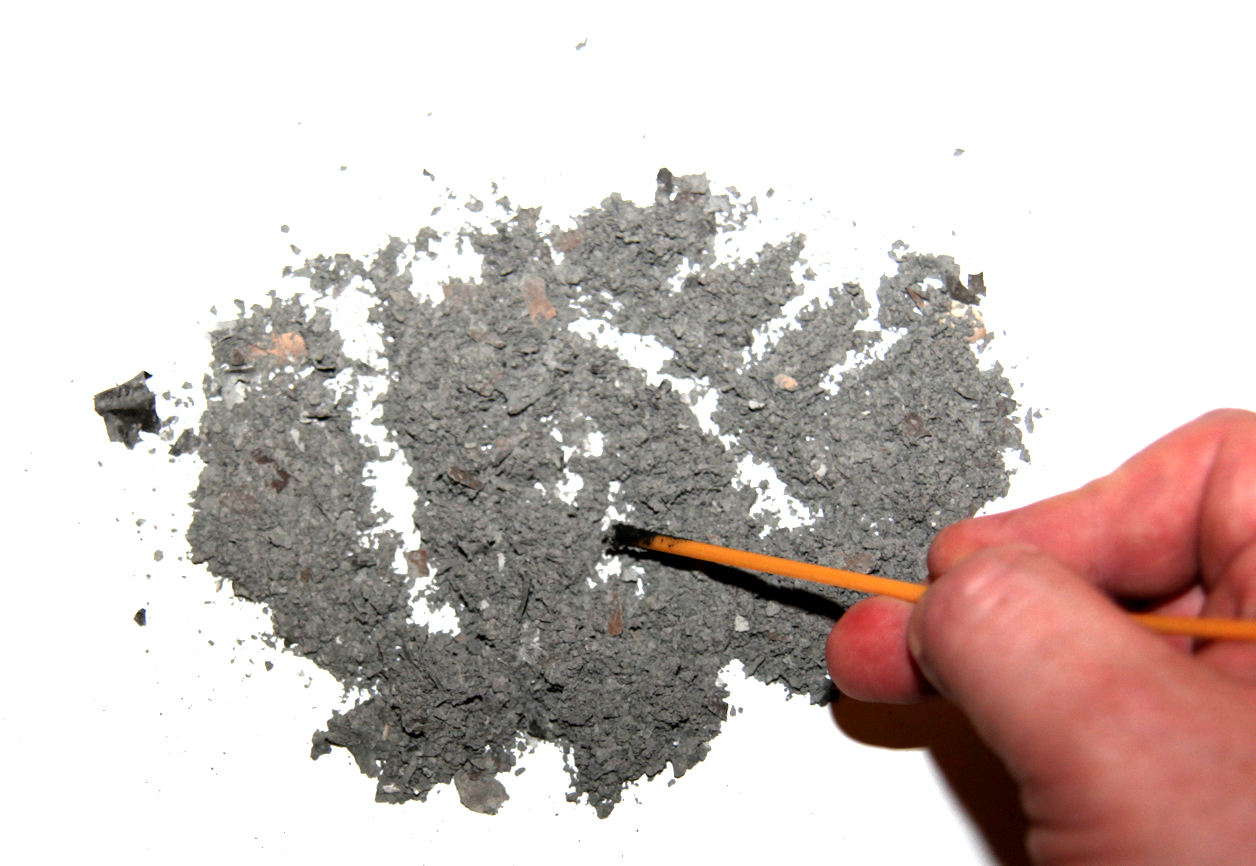
An individual practicing spodomancy by making marks in ashes. The marks are then interpreted for meaning, omens, and portents.

Spodomancy (also known as tephramancy and tephromancy) is a form of divination by examining cinders, soot, or ashes (Greek: σποδός spodós), particularly although not exclusively from a ritual sacrifice. Spodomancy has been practiced by numerous cultures, ancient and modern, across the globe. While many practitioners (particularly in Europe) have performed the ritual as part of a formal system of paranormal, religious, or ceremonial magic, many have done so as part of mere folkloric practice or superstition.

== Process ==
The ancient Greek playwright Aeschylus (525–456 BC) noted that ashes falling from a fireplace could be divined for portents. A word, phrase, name, or question would be written in the ashes with a finger or stick. The individual would wait for a breeze to disturb the ashes, which would form new letters or omens and provide an answer. Not everyone could practice the art.

In The Works of Rabelais, Book III (published in 1693), Sir Thomas Urquhart claimed that the ashes and soot must be allowed to rise naturally from the fire. The ashes were interpreted as they rose. Ashes which dispersed quickly were a positive sign, but ashes which hung in the air were not. Another tradition indicates that spodomancy may also be practiced by writing a question or message on a piece of paper and then burning it. The burned ashes and soot of the burned message were then examined for omens and interpretation.

In Poland, ashes would be spread around the bed of a sick person, and the signs which appeared in the ashes were interpreted to indicate whether the person would become healthy again or not.

Some spodomantic rituals require the use of a certain writing surface. Most rituals indicate the use of the hearth, floor, or exterior ground as the place to spread ashes. In Mongolia, a divinatory ritual exists in which scapulimancy and spodomancy are combined: a smooth layer of ashes is spread on the shoulder blade of a cow, sheep, or ox, and a lama is divinely inspired to make calculations in the ash which indicate answers to questions or the future. Bone is not the only alternative surface used. Some ancient Greek rituals of spodomancy required that the ashes be spread on a plank of wood rather than the floor.

Not all sources agree that tephramancy and tephromancy are synonyms. Some sources claim that tephramancy uses only the ash of tree bark, while tephromancy may use the ashes of any sacrifice. Other sources claim, however, that tephramancy utilized only the ashes of human sacrificial victims.

== History ==
Spodomancy is an ancient and globally widespread divination practice. The gift of prophecy was believed to run in some Greek families, and only they were allowed to seek divination from the ashes left by fires on sacrificial altars. In Ancient Thebes, the altar dedicated to Apollo was known as "Apollo of the Ashes" not only because the altar itself was composed of the ashes of human sacrificial victims but because ashes blowing off the altar could be divined for their portents. The Etruscans of the Italian peninsula, whose civilization existed from 1200 BC to 550 BC, also practiced spodomancy in a fashion similar to the Greeks. Romani folklore says ashes can be cast onto the floor. Smooth, uniform ashes are a good omen, while a pile (or piles) of ashes indicate bad fortune.

During the Qin (221–206 BC) and Han (206 BC – 220 AD) dynasties in China, a form of spodomancy was used in which the bones of sacrificial animals were raked out of fires and the marks in the ashes and cracks in the bones interpreted for their portents. Several Native American tribes believed that they could divine the future of a newborn or a friend who had left on a journey by looking in the marks and lines left in the ashes of a fire the next morning. From the 16th century to mid 19th century, unmarried English people would draw lines in smooth ashes. The ashes were an indication of a future spouse if two unmarried people sat on the same line. In Kent, this custom was used on Valentine's Day to divine who one should court. Peruvians in the late 19th century would spread ashes on the floor the night after a funeral. The next morning, footprints and other marks in the ashes would indicate what kind of animal the dead person's soul had migrated into and the direction in which that animal might be found. Among the Loma people of western Africa, spodomancy is still (as of the late 20th century) used to divine the sex of a child before birth. Chinese people in Taiwan still use the ends of sedan chair poles to mark incense ash on altars, and then interpret the marks for divine communication.

The Greco-Etruscan form of the practice seems to be the most common in Europe, historically. But the rites of the practice varied widely even into the early Renaissance. In Slavonia, only women were permitted to practice spodomancy. A woman would scratch in the ashes. An even number of scratches meant a positive outcome, while an odd number meant bad luck. In Poland, too, only women could practice the art. The practice of spodomancy continues to evolve even today. For example, modern Wiccans argue that the fire used by the spodomancer must be a sacred one.

In the Celtic pagan tradition, spodomancy did not necessarily require the reading of ashes themselves. The filidh were a class of poet-judge-seers who functioned as keepers of mythology and knowledge, historians, lawyers, arbitrators, linguistic experts, and more. One branch of the filidh was expert solely in divination and dreams, and it was commonly believed that simply sleeping next to the ashes of an animal burned in a sacrificial fire could lead to knowledge about the future.

Historical and modern writers consider spodomancy one of the least-familiar methods of divination. Nonetheless, it was common enough in Spain in the late 16th century so that Archbishop of Seville and Grand Inquisitor Alonso Manrique de Lara had to openly ban the practice. It also seems to have been widely practiced in northwestern Germany around the same time.

== Festivals ==
According to one account of the Celtic pagan tradition of the festival of Imbolc, cold ashes from the fireplace should be spread on the hearth. In the morning, markings in the ash will indicate that the goddess Brigid has visited the home and has blessed the people living there. If no markings are found, the body of a rooster must be buried at the confluence of three streams and incense burned on the fire the next evening.

An English tradition of the 19th century ("riddling the ashes") involved spodomancy on St. Mark's Eve (April 24). Ashes would be left on the hearth on St. Mark's Eve, and examined the next day. Folklore said that the footprint of anyone who was to die in the coming year would be left in the ashes. On the Isle of Man, a similar tradition was observed, although a death would occur only if the footprint pointed inward (an outward-pointing imprint would mean a birth). Another Manx tradition has it that riddling the ashes on St. Mark's Eve or Halloween will allow the spirit-imprint of one's future husband to appear in the ashes the next morning. Elsewhere in Europe, the riddling of the ashes to learn of births and deaths was observed on Halloween or New Year's Eve.

Modern Wiccans advocate practicing spodomancy on Lammas or Lughnasadh (August 1). Ashes from a bonfire or even a simple barbecue grill can be spread on the ground, and any symbols or images in the ashes interpreted. Shapes in the ashes have a wide variety of meaning.

== Similar practices ==
Spodomancy includes at least two and possibly three other divination practices and rituals involving cinders or ashes. These are:

- Cineromancy/Ceneromancy—Divination involving the ashes of a specifically sacrificial or ritual fire. This ritual calls for the removal of any unburned wood or coals, and interpreting the mounds, ridges, valleys, and other imperfections in the surface. Special attention was paid to intersections of these elements, or where they dead-ended.
- Libanomancy—Divination by studying the burning of incense, or the patterns made by incense smoke or ash.
- Xylomancy—Divination by observing the shape of wood in one's path, or the appearance wood takes while burning. Most sources places xylomancy under pyromancy (divination by observing flame, coals, or embers or by burning ritual items such as coal, laurel leaves, or salt). But one source claims that spodomancy includes xylomancy.

Divination techniques closely related to spodomancy include osteomancy (divination using bones, particularly that practice which heats them to produce cracks which are portentious), plastromancy (divination using turtle plastrons), scapulimancy (divination using the shoulder blade; the Scottish term is slinneanachd), and sternomancy (divination using the sternum). However, in these practices, fire is used to cause cracks to appear in the bone. Ash may or may not be used to fill in these cracks, making them more visible. This is not spodomancy, however, as the cracks (not the ash itself) are being read.

Spodomancy is distinguishable from capnomancy, which is divination by observing smoke, and pyromancy (and its many subsidiary rituals), which is divination by observing burning things or coals (but not their ash or cinders).

== Bibliography ==
- Amber K. and Azrael Arynn K. Candlemas: Feast of Flames. St. Paul, Minn.: Llewellyn Espanol, 2001.
- Bodin, Jean. On the Demon-Mania of Witches. Randy A. Scott, trans. Toronto: Victoria University Centre for Reformation and Renaissance Studies, 1995.
- Browne, Sylvia and Harrison, Lindsay. The Truth About Psychics: What's Real, What's Not, and How to Tell the Difference. New York: Simon and Schuster, 2009.
- Buckland, Raymond. The Fortune-Telling Book: The Encyclopedia of Divination and Soothsaying. Detroit, Mich.: Visible Ink, 2004.
- Del Rio, Martín Anton. Investigations Into Magic. P.G. Maxwell-Stuart, trans. Reprint ed. Manchester, U.K.: Manchester University Press, 2000.
- Cameron, Euan. Enchanted Europe: Superstition, Reason, and Religion, 1250-1750. New York: Oxford Univiversity Press, 2010.
- Detienne, Marcel. The Writing of Orpheus: Greek Myth in Cultural Contact. Baltimore, Md.: Johns Hopkins University Press, 2003.
- Dunwich, Gerina. Candlelight Spells: The Modern Witch's Book of Spellcasting, Feasting, and Healing. Secaucus, N.J.: Citadel Press, 1988.
- Ellison, Robert Lee. The Solitary Druid: Walking the Path of Wisdom and Spirit. New York: Kensington Publishing Corp., 2005.
- Emerson, Ellen Russell. Indian Myths or, Legends, Traditions, and Symbols of the Aborigines of America Compared With Those of Other Countries, Including Hindostan, Egypt, Persia, Assyria, and China. Boston: J.R. Osgood and Company, 1884.
- Fairbanks, Arthur. A Handbook of Greek Religion. New York: American Book Co., 1910.
- Fox, Adam. Oral and Literate Culture in England, 1500-1700. Oxford, U.K.: Oxford University Press, 2000.
- Franklin, Anna and Mason, Paul. Lammas: Celebrating Fruits of the First Harvest. St. Paul, Minn.: Llewellyn Publications, 2001.
- Hastings, James; Selbie, John Alexander; and Gray, Louis Herbert. Encyclopedia of Religion and Ethics. Edinburgh, Scotland: T&T Clark, 1908.
- Højbjerg, Christian. Resisting State Iconoclasm Among the Loma of Guinea. Durham, N.C.: Carolina Academic Press, 2007.
- Hyer, Paul and Jagchid, Sechin. A Mongolian Living Buddha: Biography of the Kanjurwa Khutughtu. Albany, N.Y.: SUNY Press, 1983.
- Lea, Henry Charles. Materials Toward a History of Witchcraft. Reprint ed. New York: T. Yoseloff, 1939.
- Maberry, Jonathan and Kramer, David F. The Cryptopedia: A Dictionary of the Weird, Strange and Downright Bizarre. New York: Citadel, 2007.
- Madame Juno. The Gypsy Queen Dream Book and Fortune Teller. San Francisco: Obscure Press, 2005.
- McCoy, Edain. Advanced Witchcraft: Go Deeper, Reach Further, Fly Higher. St. Paul, Minn.: Llewellyn, 2004.
- Mountain, Harry. The Celtic Encyclopedia. Parkland, Fla.: Upublish.com, 1998.
- Pepper, Elizabeth and Wilcock, John. Magical and Mystical Sites: Europe and the British Isles. Grand Rapids, Mich.: Phanes Press, 2000.
- Pickover, Clifford A. Dreaming the Future: The Fantastic Story of Prediction. Amherst, N.Y.: Prometheus Books, 2001.
- Radford, Edwin; Hole, Christina; and Radford, M.A. The Encyclopedia of Superstitions. Reprint ed. New York: Barnes & Noble, 1996.
- Rhys, John. Celtic Folklore: Welsh and Manx. Reprint ed. Honolulu: University Press of the Pacific, 2004.
- Robertson, John G. Robertson's Words for a Modern Age: A Cross Reference of Latin and Greek Combining Elements. Eugene, Ore.: Senior Scribe Publications, 1991.
- Robinson, John. Archaeologia Graeca, or, The Antiquities of Greece. London: R. Phillips, 1807.
- Soane, George, New Curiosities of Literature and Book of the Months. London: E. Churton, 1849.
- Spence, Lewis. An Encyclopaedia of Occultism. New York: Dodd, Mead, 1920.
- Stafford, Charles. The Roads of Chinese Childhood: Learning and Identification in Angang. Cambridge, England: Cambridge University Press, 1995.
- Thorndike, Lynn. History of Magic and Experimental Science. Reprint ed. Whitefish, Mont.: Kessinger, 1992.
- Tuitéan, Paul and Daniels, Estelle. Essential Wicca. Freedom, Calif.: Crossing Press, 2001.
- Twitchett, Denis Crispin and Fairbank, John King. The Cambridge History of China: The Ch'in and Han Empires 221 B.C.-A.D. 220. New York: Cambridge University Press, 1986.
- Waite, Arthur Edward. A Manual of Cartomancy and Occult Divination. Reprint ed. Whitefish, Mont.: Kessinger, 1995.
- Wright, Elizabeth Mary. Rustic Speech and Folk-Lore. New York: H. Milford, 1913.
- Zell-Ravenheart, Oberon and Zell-Ravenheart, Morning Glory. Creating Circles and Ceremonies: Rituals for All Seasons and Reasons. Franklin Lakes, N.J.: New Page Books, 2006.
