= The Singing Saw at Christmastime =

Studio album by Julian Koster
- Released: October 7, 2008
- Genre: Christmas, Lo-Fi, Experimental
- Label: Merge Records

Julian Koster chronology
Music Tapes for Clouds and Tornadoes (2008)	The Singing Saw at Christmastime (2008)	Mary's Voice (2012)

Professional ratings
Review scores
Source	Rating
PopMatters	(7/10)
Pitchfork Media	(7.0/10)
Spin	2/5 stars

The Singing Saw at Christmastime is an album released by Julian Koster on October 7, 2008 by Merge. It features covers of popular Christmas songs played by Julian Koster on the singing saw.

== Track listing ==
1. "The First Noel" - 2:26
2. "Frosty the Snowman" - 1:36
3. "Silent Night" - 2:18
4. "Santa Claus is Coming to Town" - 1:48
5. "Jingle Bells" - 2:41
6. "White Christmas" - 2:44
7. "Silver Bells" - 3:17
8. "Hark! The Herald Angels Sing" - 2:51
9. "O Come All Ye Faithful" - 1:25
10. "O Holy Night" - 4:16
11. "O Little Town of Bethlehem" - 1:44
12. "We Wish You a Merry Christmas" - 2:07

== Reception ==
The album received mixed-to-positive reviews. Pitchfork gave it a 7 out of 10, describing it as “unsettling, bizarre, and, on occasion, exquisite.” Spin’s 2-star (out of five) review compared the album to “your grandmother’s ghost visiting on Christmas Eve to serenade the family with wordless, impressionistic vapors that teeter between hauntingly gorgeous and slightly nauseating.”
