= Divination by Mirrors for Saw and Strings =

1998 concerto

Divination by Mirrors for Saw and Strings (1998) by Michael A. Levine is a concerto scored for two string groups tuned a quarter-step apart and placed on opposite sides of the stage with a musical saw soloist playing in both pitch universes. Featuring eight sections each named for a different means of divination and organized according to dynamic symmetry (specifically the golden ratio), the piece was premiered, with soloist Dale Stuckenbruck, at Merkin Concert Hall in New York City by New Century Chamber Orchestra and New York Virtuosi.

The eight sections of the piece are

1. Pyromancy
2. Aeromancy
3. Psychomancy
4. Oneiromancy
5. Sciomancy
6. Meteoromancy
7. Catoptromancy
8. Tephramancy

Stuckenbruck's performance has been reviewed in the Sacramento Gazette as "a wonder".
