= The Yorkshire Musical Saw Player =

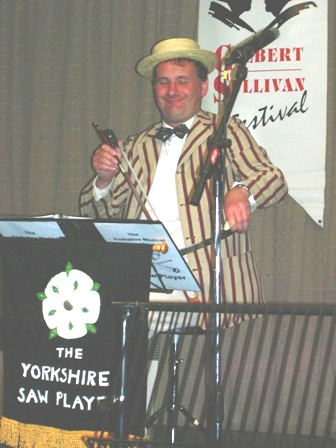
The Yorkshire Musical Saw Man

Charles Hindmarsh, stage name The Yorkshire Musical Saw Man, is an English musical performer who specialises in the playing of the musical saw.

A native of the North Yorkshire town of Harrogate, Charles studied violin at college, but gained local notability with his party-trick performances on the musical saw, occasionally playing with his local brass band. As audience appreciation of his skill on the instrument became ever more apparent, he began making professional appearances at old-time musical hall events, charity concerts and sessions as a soloist and/or with accompaniment from either piano or brass band. As well as taking part in the "BBC music live" festival he has also played in a skip outside Belfast City Hall for a "Catalyst Arts" Festival, in a folk festival at Broadstairs and as part of the International Gilbert and Sullivan Festival in Buxton.

He appeared in the BBC's A Symphony for Yorkshire in 2014 and featured in Britain's Got Talent in 2014, duetting with Banbury's Saw Lady, Caroline Watsham in a duo called "Saws Crossed".

Charles plays his musical saws at events throughout the UK. He is now actively involved in promoting the instrument through workshops and public concerts. He composes music for the instrument, provides backing tracks for other musicians and gives advice to saw makers and other composers.

In 2009, he approached a saw manufacturer in Sheffield with the aim of finding a local musical saw maker. It was a surprise that the saw maker Thomas Flinn had recently procured the firm that had manufactured the Roberts & Lee Parkstone Melody Saw. After demonstrating what was possible Thomas Flinn, started producing the saws again and has become an established British musical saw maker.

In 2013, he formed the "Euro Sawchestra" to perform at Sheffield's 100 year celebration of stainless steel.

Charles also conducts three Brass Bands in Yorkshire. They include Garforth Jubilee Brass, Summerbridge and Dacre Silver Band and Golcar Brass Band. He has also appeared in the feature film, Asylum, playing tuba with some members of the Lindley Brass Band. The film starred Natasha Richardson, Marton Csokas, Ian McKellen and Hugh Bonneville and it was filmed in High Royds Hospital in Menston, near Leeds.
