= Chocolate USA =

American indie rock band

- Origin: Tampa Bay, Florida, U.S.
- Genres: Indie rock, Shoegaze
- Years active: 1989–1994
- Label: Bar/None Records
- Past members: Julian Koster; Liza Wakeman; Keith Block; Roxy Dylwyn; Eric Morrison; Helen Popkin; Blair Block; Brad Truax; Alan Edwards; Paul Wells; Bill Doss; Eric Harris; Jesse Rogers

Chocolate USA was an American indie rock band from Tampa Bay, Florida, formed in 1989 as Miss America. The band featured Julian Koster who went on to form The Music Tapes and join Neutral Milk Hotel.

== History ==
The band formed as Miss America in 1989 with Koster as singer, guitarist, and principal songwriter, Liza Wakeman (violin) and Keith Block (drums). Soon joined by a succession of bassists, they released debut album All Jets Are Gonna Fall Today themselves in 1992 with input and performances from engineer George Harris as well as a long list of guests. It was reissued later in 1992 by Bar/None Records. The lo-fi band released a second album under Bar/None entitled Smoke Machine in 1994, this time with core members Koster, Wakeman, and Block joined by Paul Wells, Alan Edwards, Bill Doss, Eric Harris, and Jesse Rogers, before disbanding for other, ultimately more successful, projects. Their sound can be described as quirky, and containing many different sorts of instrumentation, which is a trait that went with Koster into The Music Tapes and Neutral Milk Hotel; present in their releases are Guitars, Bass Guitars, Standup Basses, Accordions, Concertinas, Rattles, drums, robot sound effects [specifically on Smoke Machine], organs, toy pianos, banjos, and numerous other instruments.

Member Bill Doss was announced dead on July 31, 2012, with the cause of death being a brain hemmorage.

== Releases ==
- All Jets Are Gonna Fall Today (1992), Bar/None – Cassette/CD
- Smoke Machine (1994), Bar/None – CD/cassette
