= 1st Imaginary Symphony for Nomad =

1st Imaginary Symphony For Nomad

Studio album by The Music Tapes
- Released: July 6, 1999
- Genre: Indie rock, experimental, psychedelic folk
- Length: 41:39
- Label: Merge Records

The Music Tapes chronology
1st Imaginary Symphony For Nomad (1999)	2nd Imaginary Symphony For Cloudmaking (2002)

Professional ratings
Review scores
Source	Rating
Allmusic	3/5 stars
Pitchfork Media	(2.7/10)

1st Imaginary Symphony For Nomad is an album by The Music Tapes, a project consisting mainly of Neutral Milk Hotel's Julian Koster in 1999 by Merge Records. It was recorded mainly on vintage equipment, using equipment such as a 1895 Edison wax cylinder recorder, a 1940s wire recorder, a "state of the art hard drive", and reel to reel tape recorders, hence its lo-fi sound. A partial concept record, among its themes the power of television, and the death of 1950s actor George Reeves, who played the hero Superman and whom Koster was entranced with as a child. The album took over 4 years to assemble, being recorded mainly at the home of the Grandmother of Music Tapes and Koster's own home. The album mixed straightforward pop songs with collage, musique concrète and traditional storytelling.

== Track listing ==
1. "Song For Soon To Be Sailor" – 2:16
2. "1st Imaginary Symphony By Vacuum Cleaner" – 1:00
3. "Song Of The Nomad Lost" – 2:34
4. "Pulled Out To Sea" – 1:34
5. "March Of The Father Fists" – 2:35
6. "Nomad Tell Us" – 3:10
7. "Aliens" – 2:32
8. "Song Of 100 Castles" – 0:55
9. "What The Single Made The Needle Sing" – 4:02
10. "The Clapping Hands" – 4:12
11. "Sea's Song For Sailor" – 0:33
12. "The Television Tells Us" – 4:34
13. "An Orchestration's Overture" – 1:53
14. "Song For The Death Of Parents" – 4:02
15. "A Warning!" – 1:30
16. "Fanfare For Speeding Bullet" – 2:13
17. "Wishing Well At Caper's End" – 2:04
