= The Ziegfeld Follies of the Air =

1930s American radio program

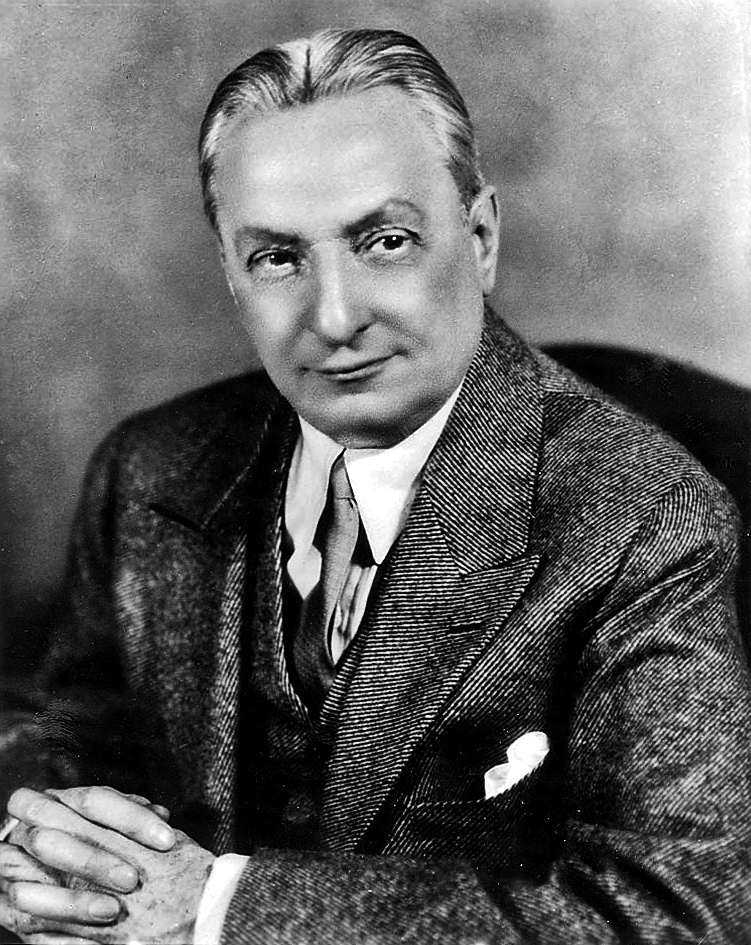
Florenz Ziegfeld

The Ziegfeld Follies of the Air was a program broadcast on CBS Radio during the 1930s which attempted to bring the success of Florenz Ziegfeld's stage shows to the new medium of radio (hence the portion of the name 'of the Air' referring to air waves).

Eddie Dowling hosted the musical variety format. Sponsored by Chrysler Motors, the half-hour series aired Sunday evenings from April 3 to June 26, 1932, moving April 24 from 8:30 pm ET to 10:30 pm ET.

With Al Goodman leading the orchestra, the line-up of guests included Fanny Brice, Helen Morgan, Jack Pearl, Will Rogers, and Ziegfeld himself. Pearl introduced his "Baron Munchausen" character. Only months after Jack Pearl was introduced to the radio audience on The Ziegfeld Follies of the Air, he had his own show. The popularity of his Baron Munchausen character led to the 1933 MGM film Meet the Baron.

Ziegfeld died on July 22, 1932, but the series returned from February 22 to June 6, 1936, serving as a tribute to the showman. Goodman returned as orchestra leader, and Brice appeared in the sketch series that eventually expanded into The Baby Snooks Show. Other guests included Patty Chapin, James Melton, and Benny Fields. Few episodes survive.

== See also ==
- The Orbiting Human Circus (of the Air)
