= The 2nd Imaginary Symphony for Cloudmaking =

2nd Imaginary Symphony For Cloudmaking

Studio album by The Music Tapes
- Released: 2002
- Genre: Indie rock, experimental, spoken word, folk
- Length: 65:36
- Label: Self Released

The Music Tapes chronology
| 1st Imaginary Symphony For Nomad (1999) | 2nd Imaginary Symphony For Cloudmaking (2002) | Music Tapes for Clouds and Tornadoes (2008) |

The 2nd Imaginary Symphony For Cloudmaking is a story album by The Music Tapes, consisting of the story of a boy named Nigh (named for Jeff Nye Mangum), who lives with his blind grandmother.

The album also features instrumentation by Julian Koster to back the spoken word recording by Brian Dewan. Koster was under contract with Merge Records to produce another album of music, but wanted to produce a concept album focused more on story and sound effects than necessarily music, inspired by Sgt. Pepper's Lonely Hearts Club Band. It never received an official mass-release per se, as Koster felt the material could not be released through his regular record label. Instead, he put the album through two self-released CD-R circulations by traveling and delivering it to various record stores himself, only to later hear it on WNYC's Spinning on Air after a DJ discovered the album. The last copy to sell on eBay went for over $125. Koster said that "an official release shall be arranged for, but it's not yet as, in truth, I've been too wrapped up in making new things."

Koster's podcast The Orbiting Human Circus (of the Air) announced in May 2017 that they would be releasing a four-part special beginning on May 10, 2017 titled "The 2nd Imaginary Symphony", which was revealed to be the entire Music Tapes album divided into four parts, with the context being it is a mysterious record found in Paris that is broadcast on "Platypus Eve." The production was described as "A story about one who disappeared, one who ran away, and the secret of how clouds are born." The full album, uncut, was released on the podcast on July 5, essentially giving the album its official wide-release 15 years after it was recorded.

== Track listing ==
1. "Nigh" – 2:39
2. "Mr. Ackerman I"# – 2:48
3. "Mr. Ackerman II"# – 2:01
4. "Story of the Factory"# – 9:27
5. "Raincoat I"# – 2:48
6. "Secret"# – 3:59
7. "Briefcase"# – 6:51
8. "Raincoat II"# – 4:17
9. "Factory I"# – 8:38
10. "City"# – 3:59
11. "Morning"# – 9:10
12. "Factory II"# – 4:57
13. "Outro Music"# – 4:10

Note: On most versions of the album available on the internet the whole album is a single track.
