= Divination bones =

Bones used in supernatural rituals

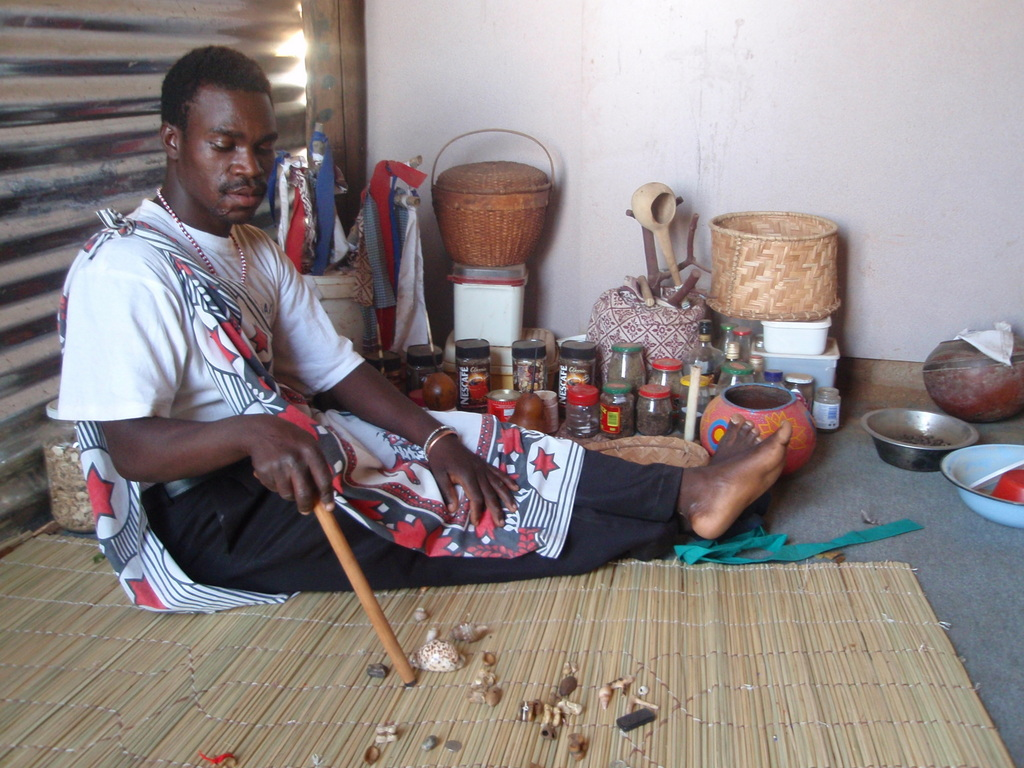
Sangoma contacting the spirits of the Badimo through divination bones

Divination bones (Sotho-Tswana languages: ditaola, isiZulu: amathambo) are pieces of bones and vertebrae, carved ivory dice and cowrie shells used for divination. It is widely known in South Africa where traditional healers, especially of the Bantu people for divination.

Mokgale Makgopa and Magaelane Koma of the University of Venda wrote that divination bones can consist of coins, dominoes, pieces of metal and gems and other things of significance to the healer.

== See also ==
- Scapulimancy
