= Julian Koster =

American musician (born 1972)

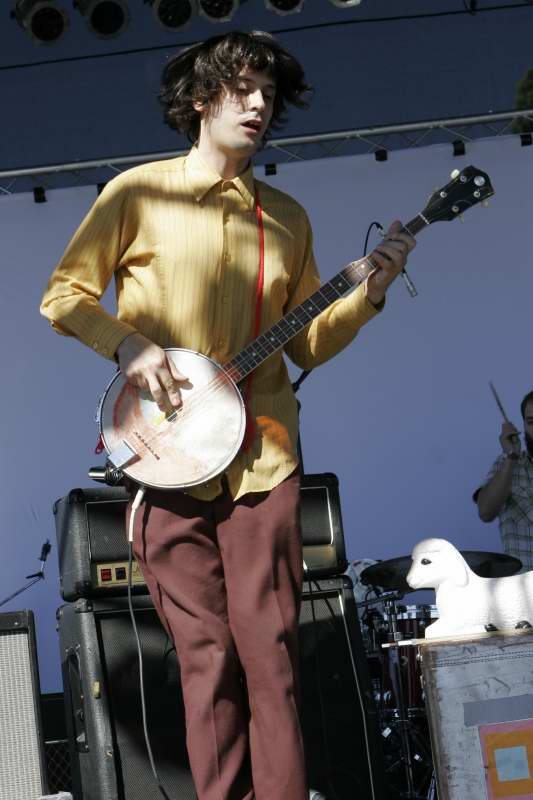
- Koster playing the banjo at ArthurFest 2005 (signature lamb-lamp seen in background)

Background information
- Born: July 26, 1972 (age 54)
- Genres: Psychedelic folk, indie folk, lo-fi
- Occupations: Musician, songwriter, storyteller
- Instruments: Musical saw, banjo, bass guitar, accordion, keyboards, vocals
- Years active: 1989–present
- Labels: Elephant Six; Merge; Orange Twin; Bar/None; Kindercore
- Member of: Major Organ and the Adding Machine; The Music Tapes
- Formerly of: Neutral Milk Hotel; Chocolate USA; of Montreal

Julian Koster (born July 25, 1972) is an American multidisciplinary artist. As a musician, he is a member of the Elephant 6 Collective, the leader of The Music Tapes, and a member of Neutral Milk Hotel. He is known for writing, directing, and acting in audio fiction The Orbiting Human Circus (of the Air), and for performing with the theatrical troupe of the same name. He is also known for his heavy use of the musical saw in recordings, even releasing The Singing Saw at Christmastime, his only solo album released under his own name, in 2008.

== Early career: Chocolate USA ==
In 1989, Koster formed Miss America with Liza Wakeman, Alan Edwards, Paul Wells and Keith Block. After legal threats from Miss America, they became Chocolate USA. Chocolate USA released two albums on Bar/None before disbanding to follow other projects.

== Neutral Milk Hotel ==
Koster joined Jeff Mangum, Scott Spillane and Jeremy Barnes to record the second Neutral Milk Hotel album, In the Aeroplane over the Sea, on which he played banjo and singing saw. Koster also played bass guitar in the live band. The success of the album, however, took its toll on Mangum, and the band went on hiatus shortly after its release. They reunited in 2013 for a worldwide tour.

== The Music Tapes and other projects ==
After Neutral Milk Hotel, Koster began to concentrate on his own solo project, The Music Tapes, for which he contributed banjo, singing saw, chord organ, and vocals, among other instruments. 1st Imaginary Symphony For Nomad was released in 1999. Koster, together with Brian Dewan, recorded the story album The 2nd Imaginary Symphony for Cloudmaking, which was distributed by Koster on CD but never officially released for 15 years. After this, nothing was released by The Music Tapes until 2008, when Music Tapes for Clouds and Tornadoes arrived, followed by extensive touring (including the Elephant 6 Holiday Surprise Tour) and an unprecedented level of public appearance by the formerly reclusive Koster.

Koster was a founding member of Major Organ and the Adding Machine. He appeared in the Major Organ and the Adding Machine film which was shown on the Holiday Surprise tour and was later released with an expanded edition of the 2001 album in 2009.

In 2008, Koster released The Singing Saw at Christmastime, a collection of Christmas carols played on the singing saw. This was followed by a caroling tour, on which he played songs from The Singing Saw at Christmastime and selected tracks from Music Tapes for Clouds and Tornadoes for free wherever fans invited him to play. This evolved into an annual caroling tradition, which transformed into the "Lullabies at Bedsides" house tour of 2010–2011 and 2011–2012 which in turn gave way to the long-planned Traveling Imaginary of 2012–2013. After the EP Purim's Shadows in 2011, in 2012, The Music Tapes released their third full-length LP, Mary's Voice.

On October 12, 2016, The Orbiting Human Circus (of the Air) podcast was released, with Koster starring as Julian the Janitor.

Koster voiced Slime Boy in the animated series High Guardian Spice, and performed the song The Guardian's Path at the end of Episode 9.

In 2023, Koster started a new band, also called Orbiting Human Circus. They released their debut album, Quartet Plus Two, on November 17. The album featured contributions from Robbie Cucchiaro and Thomas Hughes, Koster's bandmates in The Music Tapes.

== Personal life ==
Koster's father is noted flamenco guitarist Dennis Koster.

Koster does not identify as straight.

Koster is close friends with Hedwig and the Angry Inch co-creator John Cameron Mitchell, having contributed to early readings of the production and featured the character of Hedwig in some early tours with The Music Tapes. Mitchell is a cast member on Koster's Orbiting Human Circus podcast.

=== Dispute with Nesey Gallons ===
On July 9, 2024, Koster was accused by fellow Elephant 6 musician Nesey Gallons of grooming and sexual assault. Gallons alleged that the grooming began via email contact when Gallons was fifteen years old and turned physical in April 2001 when Gallons was sixteen, further alleging that Koster sexually assaulted Gallons twice in the summer of 2005. Koster acknowledged having had a sexual relationship with Gallons and expressed remorse that their age gap, while legal in Georgia (Koster was 28 and Gallons was 16), was wrong and irresponsible on his part. He denied the other allegations, and claimed that they were part of an ongoing effort by Gallons and Gallons's spouse to coerce him into entering into a romantic relationship with them.

In February 2026, Koster was granted a two-year restraining order against Gallons by a court in Bangor, Maine, where Gallons lives. District Judge Harris Mattson found Gallons abused Koster and was a "credible threat" to him after Gallons's campaign of threats and intimidation.

== Discography ==
As Julian Koster

- The Singing Saw at Christmastime (Merge; CD/LP/FLAC; 2008)

With Chocolate USA

- All Jets Are Gonna Fall Today (Bar/None; Cassette/CD; 1992) (Originally released as Miss America. Re-released as Chocolate USA.)
- Smoke Machine (Bar/None; CD; 1994)

With Major Organ and the Adding Machine

- Christmas in Stereo (Kindercore; CD; 1997)
- Major Organ and the Adding Machine (Orange Twin; CD; 2001)

With The Music Tapes

- Please Hear Mr. Flight Control (Elephant Six; 7"; 1997)
- The Television Tells Us (Elephant Six; 7"; 1998)
- 1st Imaginary Symphony For Nomad (Merge; CD/LP; 1999)
- The Music Tapes and Dad (Given free with 'Stop Smiling Magazine' #8; 7"; 2000)
- 2nd Imaginary Symphony For Cloudmaking (Self-released; CD; 2002)
- Music Tapes for Clouds and Tornadoes (Merge; CD/LP; 2008)
- Purim's Shadows: The Dark Tours the World (Merge; MP3/kazoo; 2011)
- Mary's Voice (Merge; CD/LP; 2012)
- The Orbiting Human Circus (Merge; MP3; 2017)
- The Sea of Tranquility (Merge; MP3/FLAC; 2019)
- Quartet Plus Two (Merge; CD/LP; 2023)

With Neutral Milk Hotel

- In the Aeroplane Over the Sea (Merge; CD; 1998)
- Ferris Wheel on Fire (Neutral Milk Hotel Records; 10" EP; 2011)

Other appearances

Artist	Album	Label	Format	Date	Instruments
Elf Power	Vainly Clutching at Phantom Limbs	Arena Rock Recording Co.	CD	1995	Moog synthesizer
The Olivia Tremor Control	Music from the Unrealized Film Script, Dusk at Cubist Castle	Flydaddy	LP	1996	
They Might Be Giants	Factory Showroom	Elektra Records	CD	1996	Singing saw
Elf Power	When the Red King Comes	Arena Rock Recording Co./Elephant 6	CD/LP	1997	
Black Swan Network	The Late Music	Camera Obscura	CD	1998	
Various Artists	Serotonin Ronin	Camera Obscura	CD	1998	electronics
Of Montreal	The Bedside Drama: A Petite Tragedy	Kindercore	CD	1998	
Of Montreal	The Gay Parade	Bar/None	CD	1999	Singing; Jumping on the furnace
Fablefactory	American Custard		CD	1999	Moog synthesizer
The Olivia Tremor Control	Black Foliage: Animation Music Volume One	Flydaddy	LP	1999	
Circulatory System	Circulatory System	Cloud Recordings	LP	2001	
Elk City	Sea Is Fierce	Warm Electronic Recordings	CD	2001	Singing saw
The Instruments	Billions of Phonographs	Orange Twin	CD	2002	
Kevin Ayers	The Unfairground	LO-MAX	CD	2007	Singing saw
Nesey Gallons	Eyes & Eyes & Eyes Ago	Hurrah For Karamazov	LP	2009	Singing
Quannnic	Stepdream	DeadAir	LP	2023	Singing saw, vocals, arrangement of ghosts

== Sources ==
- Cooper, Kim "Neutral Milk Hotel's in the Aeroplane Over the Sea (33 1/3)", 2005
