= Smoke Machine (album) =

Studio album by Chocolate USA
- Released: 1994
- Genre: Indie rock
- Label: Bar/None

Chocolate USA chronology
All Jets Are Gonna Fall Today (1992)	Smoke Machine (1994)

For the actual machine, see fog machine.

Smoke Machine is the second and final album by Chocolate USA. It was released in 1994 on Bar/None Records.

The band, always more a project of Julian Koster, broke up after the release of the album. Smoke Machine contains some of Bill Doss's earliest recorded performances.

== Critical reception ==
Professional ratings
Review scores
Source	Rating
AllMusic	4.5/5 stars

AllMusic wrote: "While every melody and song is catchy as hell, and although Kostner's vocals are tender, this is pop music at its most exploratory without aspiring to (yet not sacrificing) accessibility. The whole of it is unselfconscious brilliance." Trouser Press also praised it, and wrote that it "retains the determinedly unpretentious vibe of the first album, but the songwriting and arrangements are surer and more fully realized."

== Track listing ==
1. USA: Milkiest Theme
2. Bookbag
3. My Cherry Bomb
4. Another Lego in tha Cross
5. (Unlisted Track)
6. The Boy Who Stuck His Head in the Dryer (And Whirl'd Round n' Round)
7. Intermission
8. Playing in the Mud
9. Ugly Girl
10. Milk (Theme)
11. Isn't a Lie.../Glow Worm
12. We Stole the Cow
13. (Bonus Tracks from Chocolate Monthly Tapes)

== Personnel ==
- Bill Doss – "multi instruments"
- Julian Koster – vocals, guitar, bass, piano, drums, viola, concertina
- Liza Wakeman – violin
