= The Orbiting Human Circus (of the Air) =

Radio drama podcast

Orbiting Human Circus (of the Air)
- Format: surrealism, paranormal
- Language: English

Cast and voices
- Starring: Julian Koster

Publication
- No. of seasons: 2
- No. of episodes: 24
- Original release: October 4, 2016 – June 17, 2020

Related
- Website: Official website

The Orbiting Human Circus (of the Air) is a fiction radio drama podcast written and created by Julian Koster, and published by Night Vale Presents. The podcast is primarily the inner monologue of Julian the janitor, an employee of the Eiffel Tower who wishes he could work for the radio show broadcast from the top. It was released in two seasons from 2016 to 2020. In September of 2025, the official Orbiting Human Circus Tumblr shared that a new series featuring characters from The Orbiting Human circus of the Air podcast is in the works. The new series will be three seasons long and will include a "full length musical's worth of songs."

== Synopsis ==
Julian the janitor is a shy, sensitive employee of the Eiffel Tower who dreams of joining the fictional radio show also titled The Orbiting Human Circus of the Air, which is broadcast from a large ballroom at the top of the tower. Listeners of the podcast hear Julian the janitor's inner thoughts as he discusses his situations with The Narrator, played by Drew Callander, an imaginary voice only Julian can hear. In addition to the conversations in his head, Julian interacts with the staff and talent of The Orbiting Human Circus of the Air, notably voiced by actors such as John Cameron Mitchell, Cecil Baldwin, Tim Robbins, Charlie Day, and Mary Elizabeth Ellis. One of the most prominent themes of the podcast is the pain of loneliness.

== History ==
The podcast was in development for several years prior to its eventual release, based on ideas Koster had been developing. Some of Koster's dialogue was recorded in his spare time during the Neutral Milk Hotel reunion tour, while Mitchell recorded much of his during his run in Hedwig and the Angry Inch on Broadway, both events having occurred over a year before the series' release. Koster cites British humor, specifically The Goon Show, as inspiration for some of the podcast's absurdism, in that jokes are delivered with little time for the audience to process the information. Koster employed a RCA Ribbon microphone from the 1930s for the recordings.

The first season of the podcasts comprised eight episodes as well as a bonus question and answer episode in which Koster answers questions submitted by fans. It was the fourth podcast to be released under the Night Vale Presents name. From June to July 2017, the podcast released "an Orbiting Human Circus Special," titled "The 2nd Imaginary Symphony," which served as the official wide-release of Koster's 2002 album. It was announced in January 2017 that the podcast would return for a second season. The season, titled "Naughty Till New Years," premiered on November 6, 2019, and the podcast concluded with a finale on June 17, 2020.

A series of live shows were made through international tours in 2023 and 2024. This began with a US tour in fall 2023, a Japanese tour in spring 2024, and finally a tour across the US and Europe in the summer of 2024. This last tour was conducted jointly with The Music Tapes, and concluded with a final performance at Egersund Visefestival from July 4–6, 2024.

== Episodes ==
=== Season One ===
Title	Running Time (Min:Sec)	Release Date
Episode 1	27:01	Oct. 11, 2016
Episode 2 (The Cricket)	32:08	Oct. 25, 2016
Episode 3	26:46	Nov. 8, 2016
Episode 4 (The Janitor's Nights)	21:12	Nov 22, 2016
Episode 5	22:02	Dec 6, 2016
Episode 6	23:52	Dec 20, 2016
Episode 7	20:21	Jan 10, 2017
Episode 8	30:15	Jan 24, 2017
The 2nd Imaginary Symphony - An Orbiting Human Circus Holiday Special	67:04	November 20, 2018

=== Season Two ===
Title	Runtime	Release date
Firstly, the Janitor	40:00	November 6, 2019
Secondly, the Past	29:20	November 20, 2019
Thirdly... How to Disappear (Lessons I and II of III)	23:04	December 4, 2019
Fourthly... How to Disappear (Lesson III of III)	12:26	December 11, 2019
The Orbiting Human Circus Holiday Vacation	30:47	December 18, 2019
Fifthly, Do You Dream?	25:16	January 8, 2020
Sixthly, the Flea Talks	23:16	January 22, 2020
Seventhly, the Gift	22:21	February 5, 2020
Eighthly, a Booth by the Seaside	30:41	February 20, 2020
Ninthly, Guess Who's Coming to Dinner!	29:16	March 4, 2020
Tenthly, a Time for Dreamers	31:24	March 18, 2020
Eleventhly, It's a Scream (part 1) + Season Recap	19:24	May 6, 2020
Twelfthly, It's a Scream (part 2)	26:01	May 13, 2020
Season Finale, Part One	29:52	May 27, 2020
Season Finale, Part Two	49:30	June 17, 2020

=== Extras ===
Title	Running Time (Min:Sec)	Release Date
The Orbiting Human Circus (of the Air) – Teaser	2:35	Oct. 4, 2016
Bonus Episode (your questions)	30:10	Feb. 7, 2017
The Orbiting Human Circus in Naughty Till New Years: Trailer	3:42	Oct. 23, 2019
The Orbiting Human Circus Holiday Vacation	29:46	Dec. 18, 2019

=== Live shows ===
From 2023 to 2024, the show was toured across the United States, Europe and Japan.

2023 US tour
September 14, 2023	Citizen Vinyl	Asheville, NC
September 16, 2023	First Unitarian Church	Philadelphia, PA
September 18, 2023	Le Poisson Rouge	New York, NY
September 19, 2023	Pie Shop	Washington, DC
September 20, 2023	The Pinhook	Durham, NC
September 21, 2023	40 Watt Club	Athens, GA
September 23, 2023	Eyedrum	Atlanta, GA
2024 Japanese tour
March 30, 2024	Ueno Park	Tokyo
April 6, 2024	Cafe Otto	Fukuoka
April 7, 2024	Pub Voxhall	Kyoto
April 8, 2024	Bar Hachimonjiya	Kyoto
April 13, 2024	7th Floor Shibuya	Tokyo
2024 tour with The Music Tapes
June 21, 2024	The Sultan Room	Brooklyn, NY
June 22, 2024	Quarry House Tavern	Washington, DC
June 23, 2024	Johnny Brenda's	Philadelphia, PA
June 28, 2024	Concerto	Amsterdam, the Netherlands
July 1, 2024	TivoliVredenburg	Utrecht, the Netherlands
July 4–6, 2024	Egersund Visefestival	Egersund, Norway

== See also ==
- The Ziegfeld Follies of the Air
