= Music Tapes for Clouds and Tornadoes =

Studio album by The Music Tapes
- Released: August 19, 2008
- Length: 43:21
- Label: Merge Records

The Music Tapes chronology
2nd Imaginary Symphony For Cloudmaking (2002)	Music Tapes for Clouds and Tornadoes (2008)	Mary's Voice (2012)

Professional ratings
Aggregate scores
Source	Rating
Metacritic	83/100
Review scores
Source	Rating
AllMusic	4/5 stars
The A.V. Club	B+
Christgau’s Consumer Guide	(dud)
Cokemachineglow	83%
Now	3/5 stars
Pitchfork	7.9/10
Spin	3.5/5 stars
Tiny Mix Tapes	4.5/5 stars

Music Tapes for Clouds and Tornadoes is an album by The Music Tapes, a project consisting mainly of Neutral Milk Hotel's Julian Koster, released in 2008 by Merge Records. Koster spent nine years recording the album using mainly antique hardware and such as a 1895 Edison wax cylinder recorder, a 1940s wire recorder, a "state of the art hard drive", and reel to reel tape recorders.

== Track listing ==
1. "Saw Pingpong And Orchestra" – 1:23
2. "Schedrevka" – 0:54
3. "Freeing Song For Reindeer" – 2:59
4. "Majesty" – 2:44
5. "Nimbus Stratus Cirrus (Mr.Piano’s Majestic Haircut)" – 2:45
6. "Freeing Song By Reindeer" – 3:13
7. "Tornado Longing For Freedom" – 3:57
8. "Song For Oceans Falling" – 6:04
9. "Kolyada #1" – 0:53
10. "The Minister Of Longitude" – 4:46
11. "Manifest Destiny" – 3:37
12. "Kolyada #2" – 1:00
13. "Cumulonimbus (Magnetic Tape For Clouds)" – 4:47
14. "Julian And Grandpa" – 0:31
15. "In An Ice Palace" – 3:39
