= Scapulimancy =

Practice of divination by use of scapulae

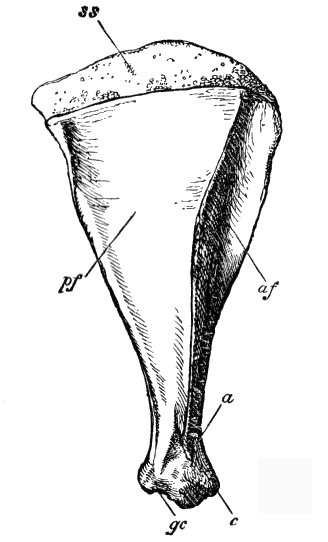
Deer scapula, showing bone formation and features

Scapulimancy (also spelled scapulomancy and scapulamancy, also termed omoplatoscopy or speal bone reading) is the practice of divination by use of scapulae or speal bones (shoulder blades). It is most widely practiced in China and the Sinosphere as oracle bones, but has also been independently developed in other traditions including the West.

Historically, scapulimancy has taken two major forms. In the first, "apyromantic", the scapula of an animal was simply examined after its slaughter. This form was widespread in Europe, Northern Africa and the Near East. However, the second form, "pyromantic" scapulimancy, involving the heating or burning of the bone and interpretation of the results, was practiced in East Asia and North America.

== Americas ==
The belief amongst the Mistassini Cree and Naskapi Innu peoples was that all animal remains were to be treated in accordance with taboos. This can blur the distinction between ritually or religiously significant remains and secular uses of the remains, which is a point of contention within existing literature. Rituals involving the divination of animal bones have been found on sacred sites of the Naskapi Innu and Eastern Cree peoples. Bones which were found hanging in trees were often displayed near encampments or a slaughter site, where hunted animals were brought. The remains were used as a medium through which divination messages were transmitted, and as such, respectful treatment of the bones was of utmost importance. The treatment of the bones between the two tribes was similar, both treating the remains with a degree of reverence, but the divination application differed.

=== Naskapi Innu ===
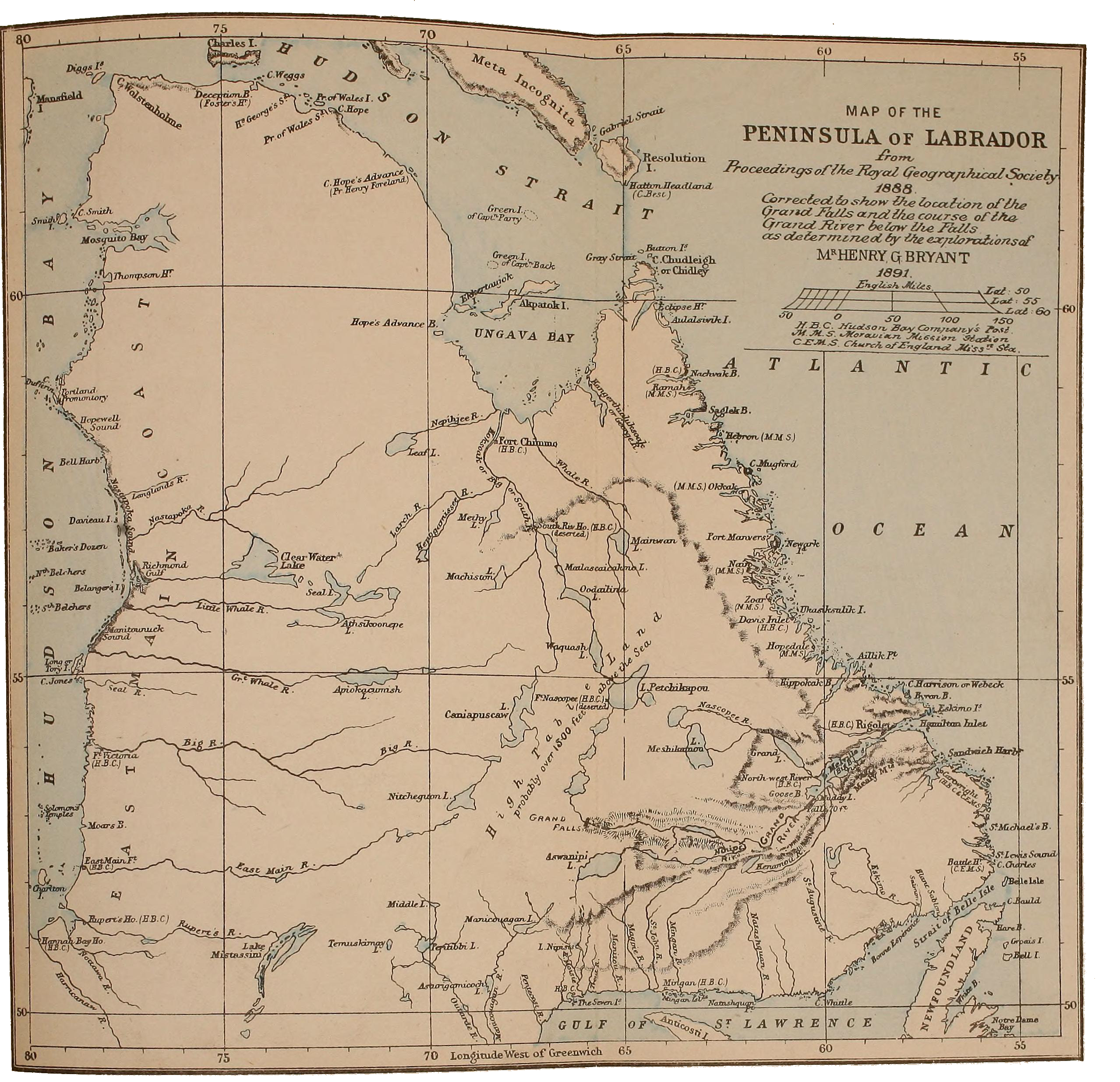
Map of the Quebec-Labrador Peninsula, 1888

The Naskapi homeland is north of Nitassinan, spanning the Quebec-Labrador Peninsula. It is a vast region populated sparsely with native timber forests and native flora but largely consisted of snow tundra. The native Algonquian peoples are related in their common use of scapulimancy (mitunsaawaakan), differentiating them from other native populations in the Americas. Generally, scapulimancy and associated divination practices were used concurrently, and were significant in predicting future weather events, personal health status and were essential in religious practices.

Principally, scapulimancy was used to aid in the hunting of caribou to ensure that communities had a sufficient supply of meat to sustain them through the winter. Associated divination rituals were performed prior to scapulimantic reading. This often included sweat bathing and percussive music performed on deer-skin drums or rattles to induce a dream state. Hunters would participate in this ritual was performed by shamans on the hunting tribespeople to help them in focalising on a dream where they were involved in hunting caribou. After awakening from their dream-state, the scapula harvested from previous hunts were used in a pyromantic ritual, which would direct the hunters to the location of the deer herd envisioned in their dream ritual.

Methods used to prepare the animal remains included removing all flesh from the bone by scraping, boiling and air drying the scapula by hanging up in the wind to dry. The animal from which the bone was from was also ritually significant. Caribou were preferred by the Innu people, as they were the main and most desirable species to be hunted. Divination would only be used where there was a shortage of food or a crisis. The process involved holding the cleaned shoulder blade over hot coals, heating and scorching the bone. The wide plane of the blade corresponded to the hunting grounds used at the time, and the cracks and scorch spots which resulted from the process were used to guide Innu hunters to spots to best find caribou deer to hunt.

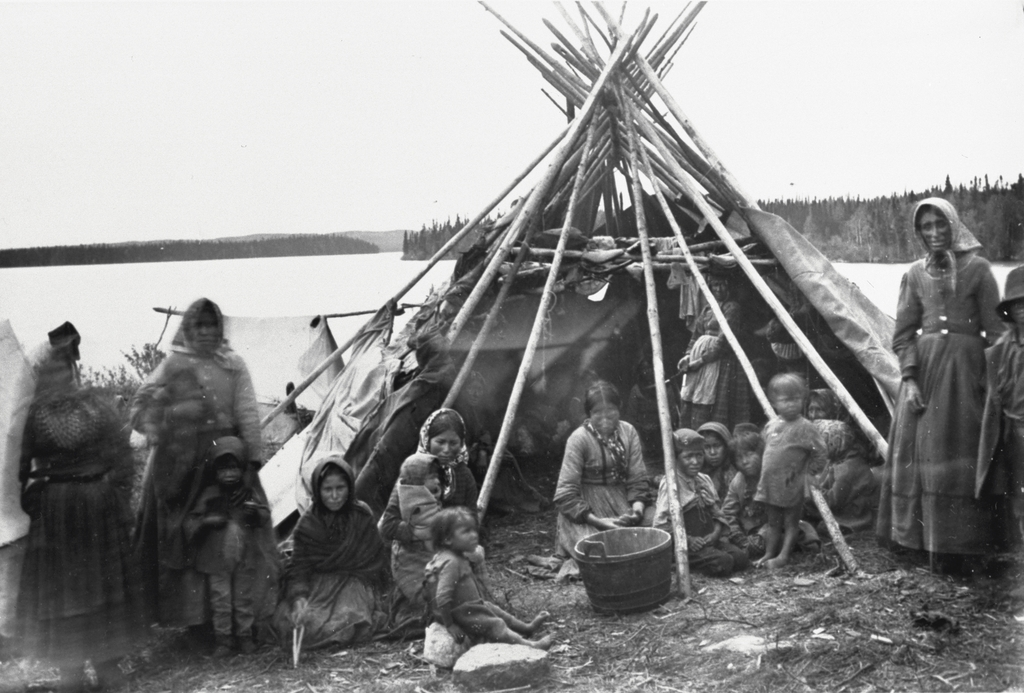
Naskapi surrounding teepee in the winter

The practitioners of scapulimancy and the Naskapi held reverence and respect towards the bone reading rituals. Relationships between practitioners and the spirit world played an important role in the scapulimantic ceremony. If the spirits had been angered by the practitioner, their wrath would be incurred, causing the reading to be deceitful to the hunters, causing them to return empty handed. To ensure that the relationship remained intact, practitioners would ensure that the specific preparations had been performed correctly and that the supplicant is honest and respectful in their dealings with the spirit world and their physical mediums.

In the modern day, these rituals are not practiced as often, although the knowledge has been passed down through oral traditions. The spiritual significance of the ritual is still held in high regard, although the interpretations yielded are largely unacted upon, as the practice is performed to maintain the traditions of old.

=== Mistassini Cree ===
Unlike that of the Naskapi Innu, the Mistassini Cree practiced multiple forms of scapulimancy. The work of academic Adrian Tanner in the field uncovered that the communities visited exclusively used porcupine scapulae in bone reading rituals.

Region inhabited by the Cree peoples

Caribou in particular were seen as spiritually powerful creatures and were revered in many native Northern populations. Consequently, the reverence towards the animal's spirit was carried to any remains of the hunted creature. This power could only be tuned by a shaman with sufficient experience and spiritual power. With the death of an elder shaman, caribou remains were not used in rituals. The size of the scapula correlated to the power stored within, and as such caribou scapulae were individually hung in trees, separated from the other remains used in bone reading. Historically, these larger scapulae were used in only the direst of circumstances by diviners and could see multiple readings performed if the situation worsened.

A point of difference between the use of scapulimancy between the Naskapi and Mistassini Cree is that the latter employed the use of bone reading to foresee a specific event in the future. Additionally, snowshoes were occasionally used as a frame for the scapulae before the cleaning and flaming of the bone commenced. This was symbolic of a journey that hunters were to embark on in the near future, imbuing energy into the scapulae. After the burning ceremony, the charred scapula was given to a child who would take it to each to each tepee, calling upon all members of the group forward. This would allow all to interpret the scapulae and draw their own conclusions before the diviner was called. Interpretations of the bone were often consistent between individuals, but the diviner's judgement was more highly respected. The inedible parts of animals, mainly the bones, also possesses the spirit of the animal. Hunters would communicate with the remains, talking to the scapula after the ceremony. They would ask the spirit to leave the medium and fly around the land of spirits and return to tell them what they saw.

== East Asia ==
In the context of the oracle bones of ancient China, which chiefly utilized both scapulae and turtles' plastrons, scapulimancy is sometimes used in a very broad sense to jointly refer to both scapulimancy and plastromancy (similar divination using plastrons). However, the term osteomancy might be more appropriate, referring to divination using bones. Many archaeological sites along the south coast and offlying islands of the Korean Peninsula show that deer and pig scapulae were used in divination during the Korean Protohistoric Period, c. 300 BC – 300/400 AD.

Scapulimancy was also mentioned in Chapter 5 of the Kojiki, the Japanese Record of Ancient Matters, in which the heavenly deities used this process of divination during a consultation by lesser gods.

=== China ===
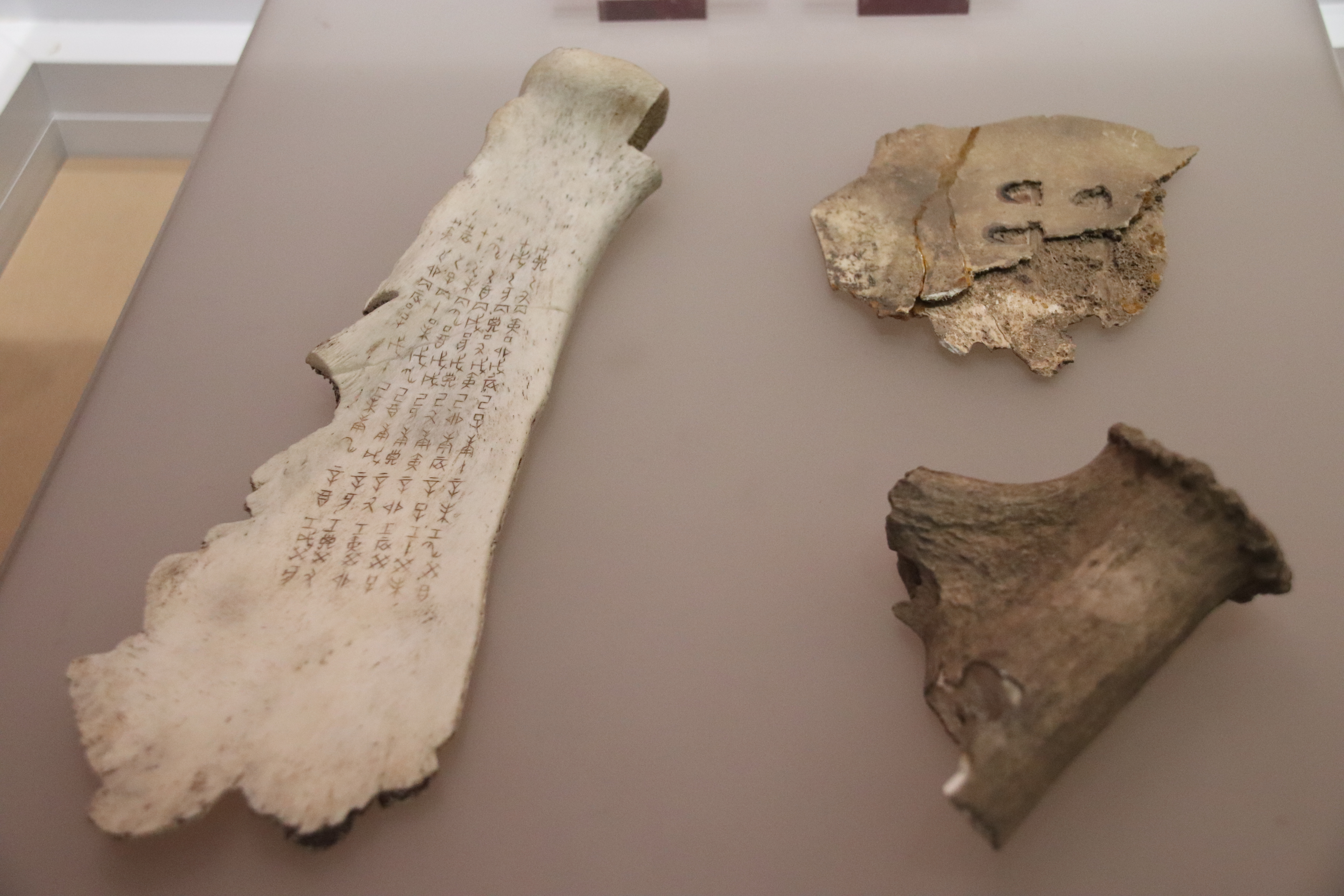
Oxen scapulae with ancient Chinese inscriptions

Archaeological discoveries in the past century have centred around the Late Shang dynasty’s capital city in Henan, where many specimens were found. This period spanned from 1250 to 1046 BC, and is historically significant as rulers such as Wu Ding and Di Xin led them with help from prominent diviners like Zheng. The status of divination was held in high social regard, with King Zhou and the diviners of the royal court assuming positions of undisputed authority. Carbon dating of specimens have categorised specimens from the Late Shang period, which share similar features due to the standardisation of scapulimantic procedures prior to heating. Cattle and oxen scapulae were much more commonly used in this period and were often coupled with etched plastrons. The caches excavated yielded remnants of pig, sheep, cattle and deer scapulae, all of which possessed scorch marks, indicating their use within a divinatory context. Additionally drill marks, where divots were carved into the shoulder blades, and etchings of Chinese characters were hallmarks of Shang dynasty oracle bones.

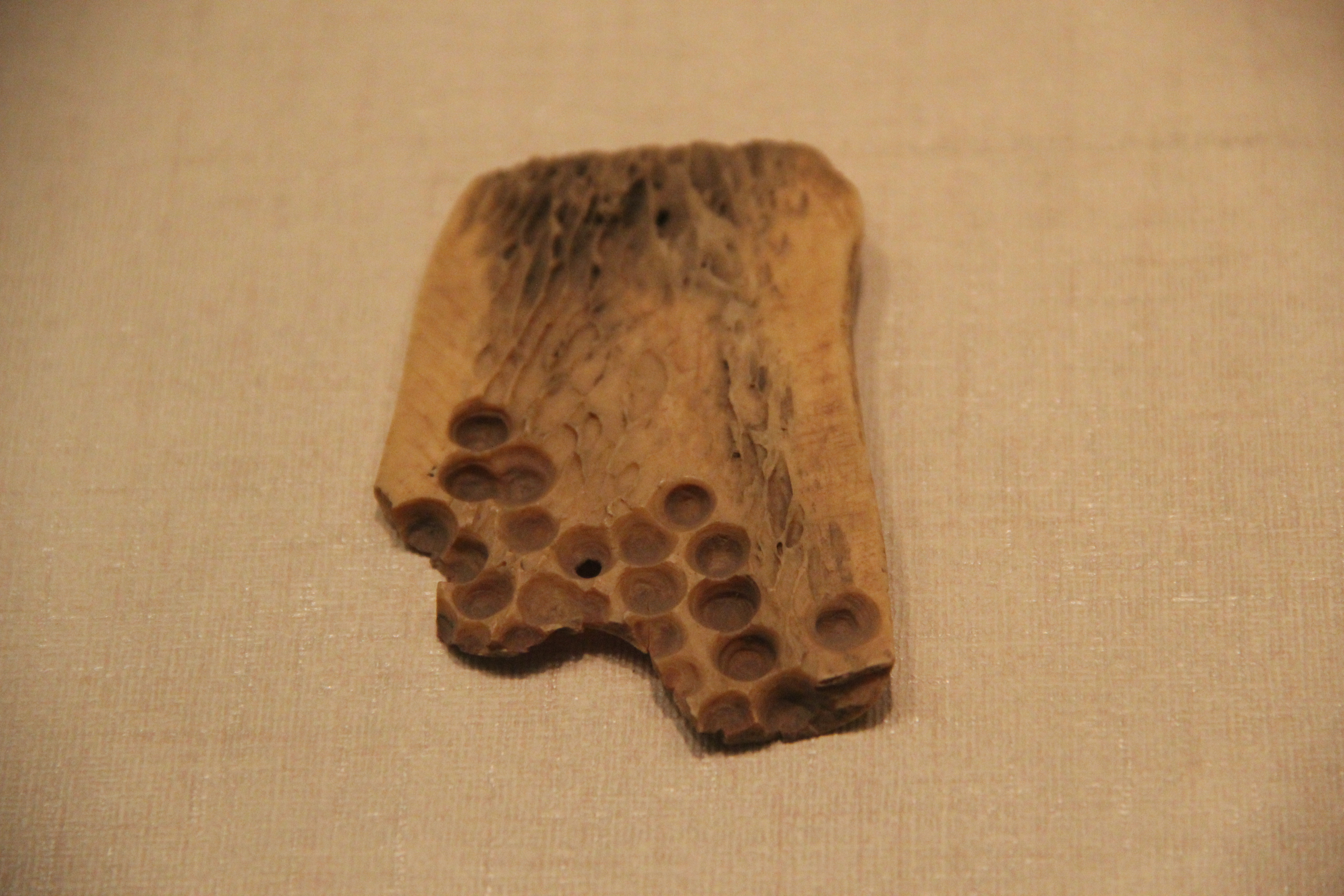
Oracle bone with drilled divots

These drilled holes within a specimen would be accompanied by carbonised fissures, thus the theory that the hollows were created to induce cracking when heated was postulated. Importantly, the royal court diviners were not the exclusive divination entity within the mid to late Shang period. Inscriptions carved into specimen's detail associated to King Zhou who were under the employ of local nobility. These diviners served the lower echelons of society, providing prognostication for agricultural and health purposes. Differences between the divining specimens used by the royal court and associated diviners included more elaborate aesthetic detail, where the edge of the scapula was polished, drilled hollows were symmetrically paired, and attendant chisel marks were etched. Associate diviners attending to the public interpreted much simpler oracle bones.

Notably, specimens found outside the region spanning the capital city of Anyang were far less intricate, with unfinished surfaces and fewer etched characters.

=== Mongolia ===
Inner Mongolia

Radiocarbon analysis of scapulae found at sites in Fuhegoumen, Inner Mongolia, have dated the remains to approximately 3322 BC, making the Mongolian people one of the earliest users of pyromantic scapulimancy. Other early discovery of scapulimancy in regions in northern China include Zhaizita in nearby Jungar Banner, Fujiamen in Wushan, Gansu province, and Xiawanggang in Xichuan, Henan province that is associated with the late Yangshao culture. The proximity of Inner Mongolia to other regions of northern China has led to some theories speculating the spread of scapulimantic rituals across Eastern Asia.

Scapulimancy practices in the Mongolian Plateau have been documented by researchers with reference to divination manuals. These diviners would refer to these manuals to guide their interpretation of the animal remains, often to facilitate them acting as a bridge between the spirit worlds. However, the manual was not leveraged by shamans as a defined list of direct outcomes, but rather aided in guiding diviner interpretations through using a shared system of belief.

Preparation methods involved a scorching ceremony, where the animal scapulae were washed, then placed onto a fire where incantations were chanted. This process purified the bone, making it suitable for interpretation by the shaman. The formation of cracks on different planes of the scapulae correlated to outcomes outlined in the sacred manuals. Other signs which would guide shamans was the colour of the scapula, such as a yellowing, or a bone-white colour. Diviner's reputations would depend on their ability to decipher the signs presented to them. The role of the divining shamans remedial, where negative readings of one's fate would see a suggested ritual which could be performed to help temper the spirits. Diviners were held in significant social regard due to their role as spirit mediums Mongolian people one of the earliest documented users of pyromantic scapulimancy.

== Europe ==
Scapulimancy is also a method of divination among Greek and Serb farmers, even today. It is probably of extremely ancient origin. More recently, references are found in the memoirs of several warriors who fought during the Greek War of Independence. After feasts with roast lambs or kids, anyone who knew how to "read" a scapula would clean it of any remaining flesh and, lifting it up to the light, interpret the various shadowy bits showing on the transparent part of the bone. A clear scapula was a good omen. Shadowy bits were used to predict the outcome of a battle on the morrow, whether death or survival.

In Renaissance magic, scapulimancy (known as "spatulamancy") was classified as one of the seven "forbidden arts", along with necromancy, geomancy, aeromancy, pyromancy, chiromancy (palmistry), and hydromancy.

== West Asia ==
=== Arabic world ===
Existing literature regarding Arabic scapulimancy are sparse, with few translated into Latin and English available to be used as sources. Paragraphs from Arabic scripts have been contextualised and translated to help in understanding the use of scapulimancy in the Arabic world. A Florentine manuscript dated to the 1600s is currently the most referenced source in terms of incorporating a compiled translation of Arabic works into Latin in Bibliotheca Laurenziana, a book detailing magic, summoning prayers, recipes for potent salves and divination.

The text attributes the practice of scapulimancy in medieval Western European civilisations to the migration of traditions and ideas from the Arabic world, noting the influence of Muslim Spain. Trade across the Silk Road has been proposed as a medium through which scapulimantic practices have pervaded into medieval European traditions from merchant trade with Arabic nomads.

Harvesting the scapulae from live animals involved decapitating the animal with a sword, without it seeing the weapon being swung, after which the animal was boiled until the flesh separated from the bones. The scapulae were extracted and wrapped in linen cloth and placed beneath the pillow of the diviner before they slept. The reading could only be performed the following day after this procedure had taken place.

Reading of the scapula was divided into two sections: the inside blade and the external features. The internal plane of the scapula has a prominent spine running through and was used for interpreting familial issues regarding fertility and prosperity. The external border of the scapula was used when questions regarding political or public events were being asked of the diviner.

== Africa ==
=== South Africa ===
Zulu population within South Africa

Zulu diviners, known as izangomas, have traditionally used bone reading in conjunction with other rituals involving herbal concoctions to communicate with spirits and those who have passed. Treated bones are placed into the medicine, with the izangoma interpreting aspects of the scapula which float above the liquid as spiritual communication. People within the community will seek out an izangoma if they would like personal questions answered regarding either themselves or to communicate with the deceased. The practice of scapulimancy and wider bone reading rituals are still used by witch doctors in many African communities, incorporated into a wider array of traditional healing ceremonies.

== See also ==
- Hippomancy – Ancient divination method through horses
- Plastromancy – Shells and bones used for divination in ancient China
- Slinneanachd
- Sternomancy – Type of divination
- Divination bones – Bones used in supernatural rituals
