= All Jets Are Gonna Fall Today =

Studio album by Chocolate USA
- Released: 1992
- Recorded: 1990
- Genre: Pop
- Length: 50:15
- Label: Bar/None
- Producer: Chocolate USA

Chocolate USA chronology
All Jets Are Gonna Fall Today (1992)	Smoke Machine (1994)

All Jets Are Gonna Fall Today is the debut full-length album by the American band Chocolate USA. Released in 1992, it was their first album for Bar/None Records. The band started working on it in 1990. It was recorded under Chocolate USA's former name, Miss America.

== Critical reception ==
Professional ratings
Review scores
Source	Rating
AllMusic	3/5 stars

Trouser Press wrote that "Chocolate USA is nothing if not eclectic; although most of the album is acoustic slacker pop, 'Skyphilis/Air Raid' kicks off as a pastiche of Tommy Dorsey’s big band sound and glides into an extended free-jazz fantasy." The Tampa Bay Times called the album "rife with fragmented genius, nervous energy and a creative vibe so powerful, it could send shivers down a spine of stainless steel." The Times Union considered it a "wonderfully wild pastiche of pop." The Tampa Tribune deemed the album "a montage of silly love songs, jazz fusion, guitar-distortion noise and snippets of a taped correspondence."

== Track listing ==
1. Test (Julian Koster) :40
2. All Jets Are Gonna Fall Today (Koster) – 3:14
3. Doogie Love Theme/Wysotsky's Tea (Koster) – 2:25
4. My Little Two Eyes (Koster) – 3:04
5. 100 Feet Tall (Koster) – 2:36
6. The Feelies Show (Eric Morrison) – 3:02
7. Skyphilis/Air Raid (Koster) – 3:46
8. The Shower Song (Koster) – 3:57
9. Wash My Face (Koster) – 4:32
10. Two Dogs (Koster) – 1:58
11. Vocal Exercise No. 1 (Koster) :32
12. The Crashing Song (Koster) – 2:33
13. Luniks Furniture (Koster) – 2:39
14. Kriss Ford (Koster) – 2:43
15. Kathy (Koster) – 1:38
16. Nervous Aged Catalunian (Koster) – 3:07
17. Loud (Koster) – 4:22
18. Smile (Koster) – 3:27
19. She's an Aeroplane (Koster) – 4:21

== Personnel ==
- Julian Koster – vocals, guitar, bass
- Liza Wakeman – violin
