= Sternomancy =

Type of divination

Sternomancy, from the Greek sternon (chest) is a divination practice involving reading the markings or bumps on the chest or breast bone (or the area "from the breast to the belly", according to some sources). Sternomancy may have been commonly practiced on victims of sacrifice, including human sacrifice. Sternomancy may also include speaking through the chest (believed to be an early form of ventriloquism).

The size and shape of the sternum bone are taken into consideration, as well as the way in which the bone burns when placed into a fire. The old holiday custom of the breaking of a chicken's or turkey's wishbone by two persons is actually a remnant of this type of divination.

Sternomancy is related to phrenology (head-reading), palmistry (chiromancy) and scapulomancy (divination by observing animal shoulder-blades).

== Sources ==
- Mackay, C. (2019). Extraordinary Popular Delusions and the Madness of Crowds: Vol.1-3. e-artnow.
