= Angela Perley and the Howlin' Moons =

American rock band

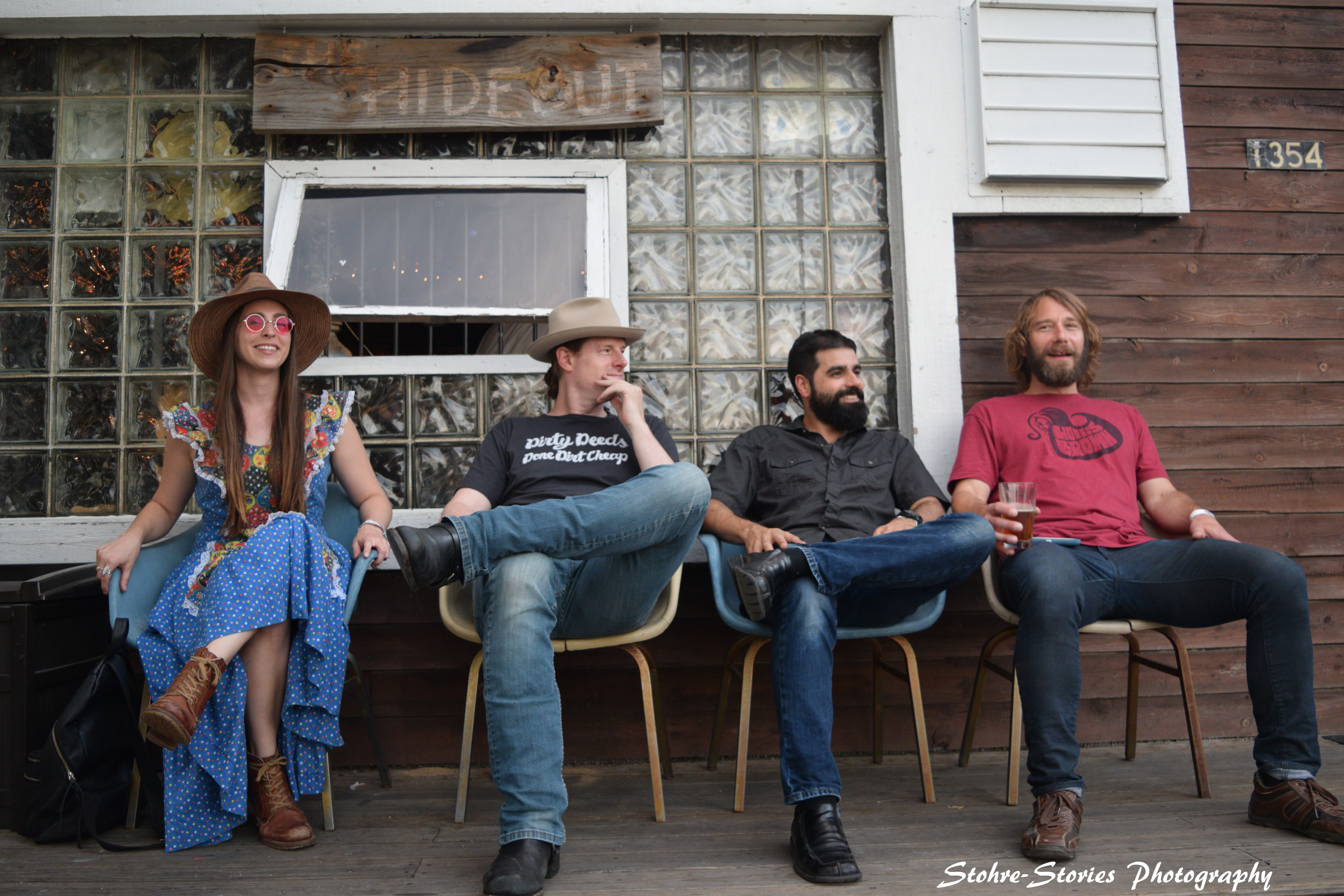
- From left to right, Angela Perley, Chris Connor, Aaron Bishara, and Billy Zehnal at The Hideout in Chicago, Illinois

Background information
- Origin: Columbus, Ohio
- Genres: Alternative rock, folk rock, americana
- Years active: 2009–present
- Label: Vital Music USA
- Members: Angela Perley; Chris Connor; BIlly Zehnal

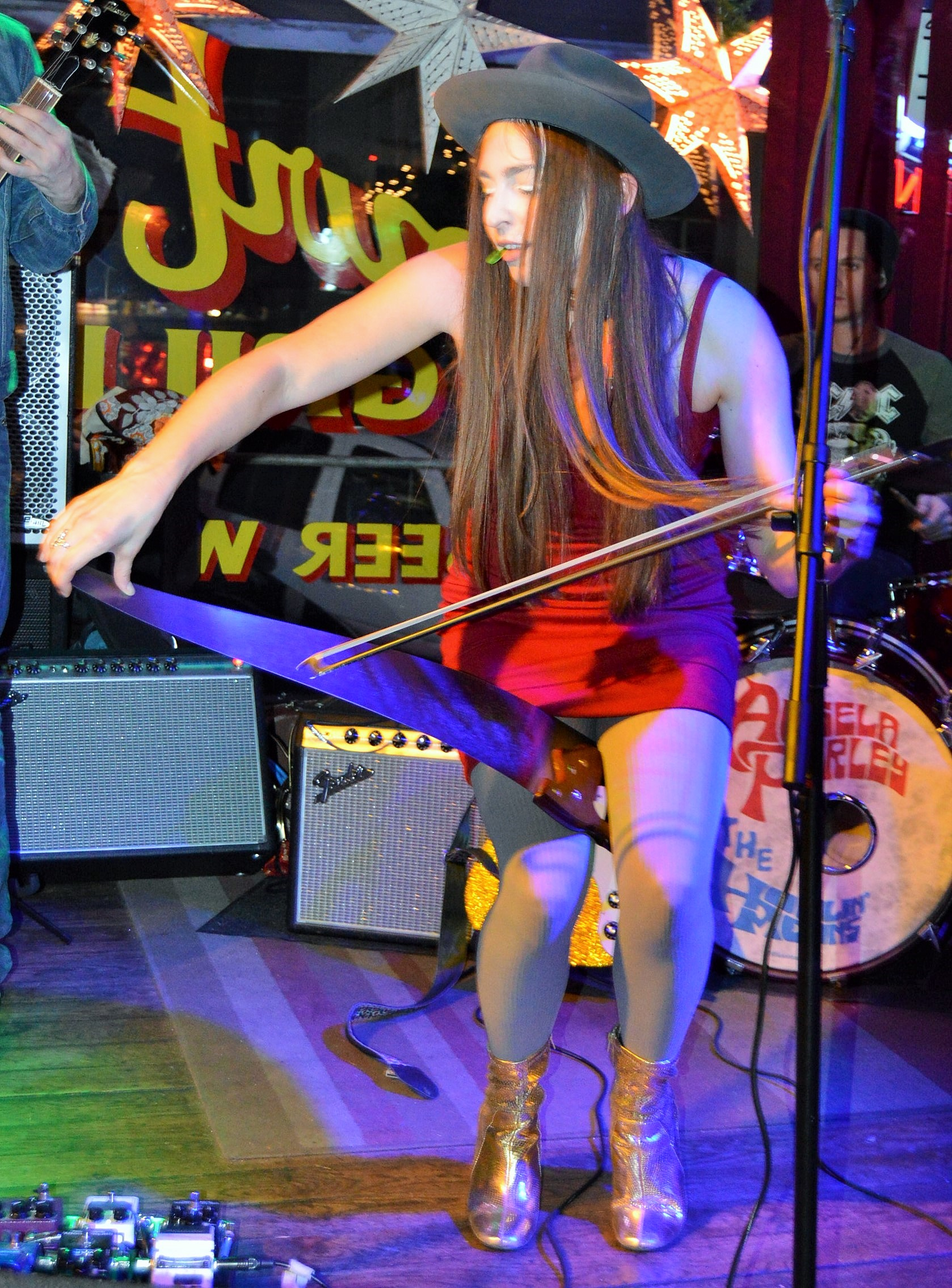
Angela Perley

Angela Perley and the Howlin' Moons is an American rock band from Columbus, Ohio, formed in 2009 with singer/guitarist Angela Perley, guitarist Chris Connor, and bass player Billy Zehnal through a "blind date" via their producer Fred Blitzer. They have released four EPs and two albums, and are signed to Vital Music USA. After gaining popularity through local shows, they began playing nationally and at various music festivals.

== Biography ==
An Ohio native, Angela Perley began writing songs in high school with Bob Dylan being a heavy influence on her, along with '70s-era female singer-songwriters Joni Mitchell, Joan Baez, and Carole King. She began playing piano when she was 10, and while attending Hilliard Darby High School, was a member in the school orchestra. In high school, Perley was part of a power-pop band called The Frankies, and in college, an acoustic band called Scarlet and the Yellow Moons. She attended Ohio University, graduating in 2008 with a degree in English, and, while playing in different groups and working on solo music, became influenced by the culture and arts of Athens. In an interview with the Columbus Dispatch, Perley stated that she "spent many a night in the Ohio University music library researching old folk tunes and looking up and listening to songs on the Library of Congress website". Her time at Ohio University and the influence that the Athens community had on her led to the creation of the band's song, "Athens", the music video for which was filmed at several spots on location in the city.

One of Perley's demos was heard by Fred Blitzer, CEO of Vital Companies, who arranged Perley to meet with musicians and longtime friends Chris Connor and Billy Zehnal in 2009. Connor's guitar work for the band has merited him with the quote of having lines that "maintain a distinctly down-home feel even as they melt your face off". Zehnal's bass has been reviewed as "supple and sturdy"; "an additional voice as well as a backbone to each song". Perley provides an additional creativity to the sound of a band by performing with a bowed saw on certain tracks, such as "Easy". The band has worked with a number of drummers, including Jeff Martin, who performed on their second album Homemade Vision, and currently work with a rotation of drummers. Combining styles of "Americana-country, indie, rock, and folk", the band has been likened with Grace Potter and the Nocturnals. In 2016, the band was recruited to be a part of Art Makes Columbus, a promotional marketing campaign sponsored by the Greater Columbus Arts Council. After finding success with local shows, the band began performing nationally, and have played at music festivals such as the Nelsonville Music Festival alongside well-known names like Merle Haggard, The Flaming Lips, St. Vincent, Randy Newman, and Gillian Welch. Perley has also been featured on The Womack Family Band's track, "Way It Is". The band has also won Columbus Alive's "Best Local Band" in 2015 and 2016. Along with shows in cities such as New York City and Knoxville, the band has had one of its songs licensed for use on ESPN during a college football game.

=== Hey Kid ===
The band released their debut studio album, Hey Kid, on January 21, 2014, under the label Vital Music USA and charted at No. 6 on the EuroAmericana Chart in March 2014. This "excellent blend of jangly Americana and sexy, reverb-laden rock'n'roll" produced two singles, "Hurricane" and "Athens", which won Angela an International Songwriting Competition Award in 2014. Hey Kid is composed of different styles, and "has roots its roots in country, but [...] is a terrific rock'n'roll album".

=== Homemade Vision ===
Homemade Vision, the band's sophomore studio album, was released on January 22, 2016, under the label Vital Music USA. The album was produced by Michael Landolt, who recorded the 10× Platinum album "Songs About Jane" by Maroon 5. The title of the album comes from a lyric in the album's first track, "White Doves", and is said by Perley to describe the dreamy and evolved sounds that this album encompasses. With two singles released so far, "Electric Flame" and "Your Love", "Homemade Vision tests the bolts on the chicken wire, the only jagged shapes flying through the air being those aimed towards the audience in the guise of beautifully dirty six-string riffs, load-bearing bass runs and tub-thumping percussion". Perley has stated that the album has "elements of dreamy psychedelia – lots of effected guitar tones and Hammond B-3 organ – that expands on the band's past work".

== Discography ==
=== Studio albums ===
Hey Kid

- Released: January 21, 2014
- Label: Vital Music USA
- Formats: CD, digital download

Homemade Vision

- Released: January 22, 2016
- Label: Vital Music USA
- Formats: CD, digital download

4:30

- Released: August 2, 2019
- Label: independent
- Formats: CD, digital download, vinyl

=== Extended plays ===
- Black Cat EP (2010)
- Yellow Moon EP (2011)
- Fireside EP (2011)
- Nowhere Is Now Here EP (2012)

== Members ==
- Angela Perley – vocals, guitar
- Chris Connor – guitar
