= Mary's Voice =

Studio album by The Music Tapes
- Released: September 4, 2012
- Genres: Indie rock, experimental, psychedelic folk
- Length: 41:28
- Label: Merge Records

The Music Tapes chronology
Music Tapes for Clouds and Tornadoes (2008)	Mary's Voice (2012)

Mary's Voice is an album by The Music Tapes. Material from the album was previewed during the band's previous caroling tours. In the lead-up to the album, Julian Koster held a Kickstarter campaign for a subsequent tour, with rewards including signed copies/master copies of the album, personalized messages and images, and Koster's banjo used on previous albums, most notably Neutral Milk Hotel's In the Aeroplane Over the Sea. The album also features additional instrumentation from several members of the Elephant 6 Collective.

A music video for "S’Alive to Be Known (May We Starve)" premiered on MTV Hive shortly after the album's release.

== Track listing ==
1. "The Dark Is Singing Songs (Sleepy Time Down South)" – 4:42
2. "Saw and Calliope Organ on Wire" – 0:57
3. "S' Alive (Pt. 1)" – 0:57
4. "The Big Beautiful Shops (It's Said That It Could Be Anyone)" – 5:03
5. "Spare the Dark Streets" – 4:16
6. "To All Who Say Goodnight" – 5:24
7. "Intermission (Pt. 1)" – 0:08
8. "Intermission (Pt. 2)" – 0:08
9. "Kolyada #3" – 1:43
10. "Playing Evening" – 4:33
11. "Go Home Again" – 3:29
12. "S' Alive to Be Known (May We Starve)" – 3:22
13. "Untitled" – 0:16
14. "Takeshi and Elijah" – 6:37

Note: The tracks "Intermission (Pt. 1)" and "Intermission (Pt. 2)" only appear on the CD and digital versions of the album. They are included to represent the flipping of a vinyl record.
