= Slinneanachd =

Slinneanachd is a kind of divination formerly practiced in Scotland. The practice is now extinct.

It involved inspecting the shoulderblades of an animal (usually a carcass), and according to one version, one had to eat the flesh of the animal without touching the bone with tooth or nail.

== See also ==
- Scapulimancy
- Oracle Bone
