= The Olivia Tremor Control discography =

Discography of American rock band

- Studio albums: 3
- EPs: 3
- Live albums: 1
- Compilation albums: 2

The discography of American rock band The Olivia Tremor Control consists of three studio albums, several extended plays and singles, a live session release, and two compilation albums. The band's first studio album, Music from the Unrealized Film Script: Dusk at Cubist Castle, was released in 1996, followed by Black Foliage: Animation Music Volume One in 1999. Their third studio album, The Same Place, was announced for October 2026.

== Albums ==
Title	Album details
Music from the Unrealized Film Script: Dusk at Cubist Castle	Released: August 6, 1996; Label: Flydaddy; Format: CD, vinyl
Black Foliage: Animation Music Volume One	Released: March 23, 1999; Label: Flydaddy; Format: CD, vinyl
The Same Place	Released: October 23, 2026; Label: Elephant 6; Format: CD, vinyl, streaming

== Extended plays ==
Title	Release details
California Demise	Released: 1994; Label: Elephant Six; Format: vinyl
The Giant Day	Released: 1995; Label: Drug Racer; Format: vinyl
Jumping Fences	Released: May 16, 1997; Label: The Blue Rose Record Company; Format: CD, vinyl

== Live albums ==
Title	Release details
John Peel Session	Recorded: 1997; Released: 2000; Label: Chunklet Industries; Format: CD, vinyl

== Compilations ==
Title	Album details
Singles and Beyond	Released: August 8, 2000; Label: Emperor Norton Records; Format: CD, vinyl
A Sleepy Company Live	Released: June 13, 2015; Label: Southern Shelter Records; Format: streaming

== Singles and other releases ==
Title	Year	Release
"The Opera House"	1996	Music from the Unrealized Film Script: Dusk at Cubist Castle
"Jumping Fences"	1997	Music from the Unrealized Film Script: Dusk at Cubist Castle
"Hideaway"	1998	Black Foliage: Animation Music Volume One
"The Same Place"	2024	The Same Place
"Garden of Light"	2024	The Same Place
"Timewaster"	2026	The Same Place
"Advice from the Oceans"	2026	The Same Place

== Other releases ==
Title	Release details
Explanation II: Instrumental Themes and Dream Sequences	Released: 1996; Type: Companion album and bonus disc; Label: Flydaddy Records
The Olivia Tremor Control/Black Swan Network	Released: 1997; Type: Split release; Label: Flydaddy Records
The Olivia Tremor Control / The Apples in Stereo	Released: 1994; Type: Split single; Label: Small Fi Records
Once Upon a Time	Released: 2000; Type: Collaborative release with Kahimi Karie; Label: Polydor Japan
