= Bill Doss =

American musician (1968–2012)

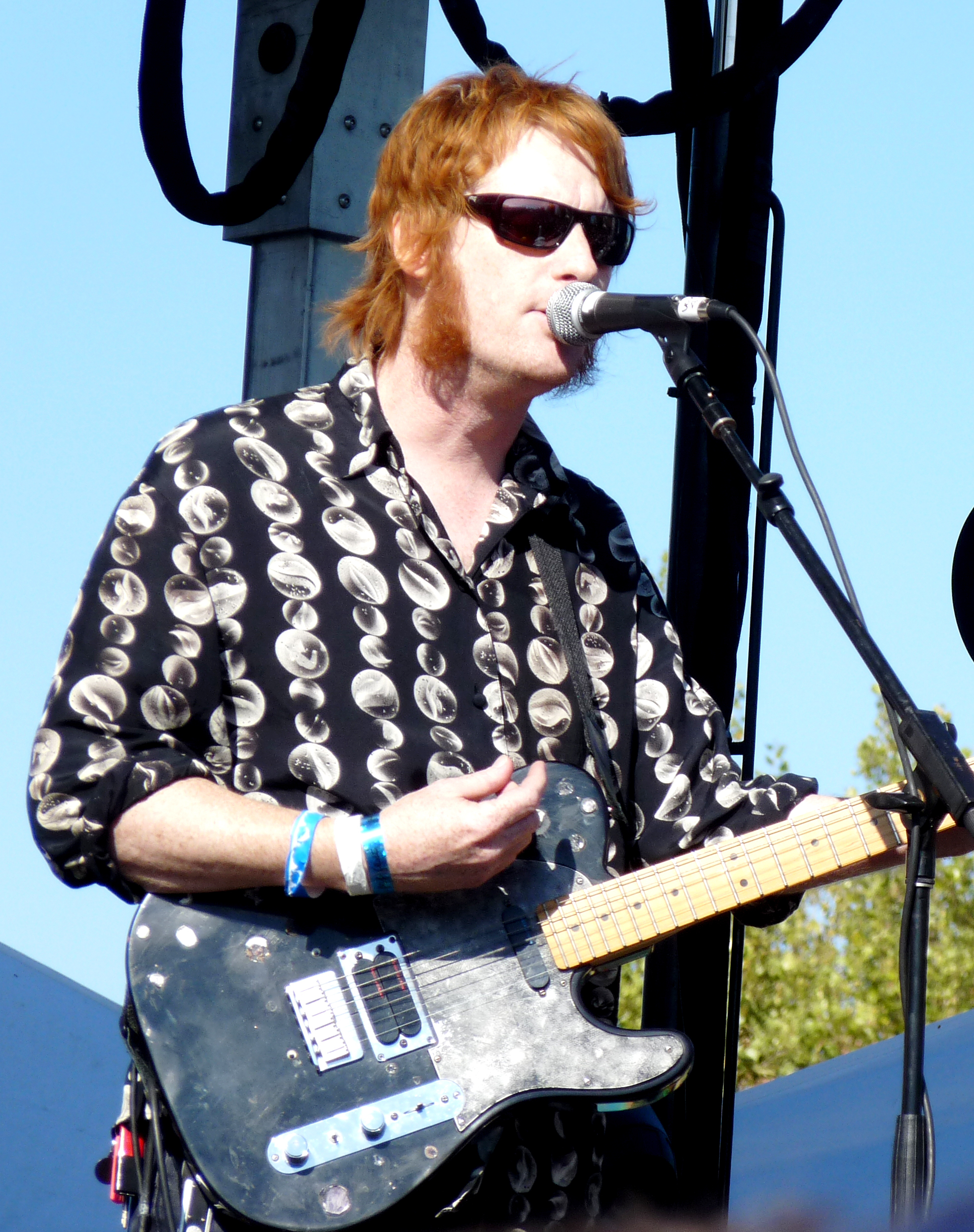
- Doss in 2010

Background information
- Born: September 12, 1968
- Died: July 30, 2012 (aged 43) Dubach, Louisiana, US
- Genre: Indie rock
- Instruments: Guitar; cornet; percussion; vocals
- Years active: 1992–2012
- Labels: Cloud; Flydaddy; Elephant 6
- Formerly of: The Olivia Tremor Control; The Apples in Stereo; Major Organ and the Adding Machine; The Sunshine Fix

Bill Doss (September 12, 1968 – July 30, 2012) was an American rock musician. He co-founded The Elephant 6 Recording Company in Athens, Georgia, and was a key member of the Olivia Tremor Control. Following the band's breakup, he led the Sunshine Fix and later became a member of the Apples in Stereo. Doss was married to freelance photographer Amy Hairston Doss, whom he met while both were attending Louisiana Tech University.

== Early career ==
Doss was born on September 12, 1968. He was a native of Dubach, Louisiana, where he met Will Cullen Hart, Robert Schneider and Jeff Mangum, his friends at nearby Ruston High School. Before the Olivia Tremor Control Doss had recorded under the name the Sunshine Fix, and self-released A Spiraling World of Pop, which later helped comprise the Olivia Tremor Control songs. Before the Olivia Tremor Control, Doss had spent some time in the army, after which he joined New York-based band Chocolate USA before returning to Athens, Georgia, where he was a resident at the time of his death.

== Olivia Tremor Control ==
Doss, Hart and Mangum soon formed what was later to become the Olivia Tremor Control. After Mangum left the band to pursue his own Neutral Milk Hotel, Hart and Doss began to pool their musical influences, Hart being a proponent of experimentalism, Doss of 60's pop such as the Beatles, the Beach Boys and the Zombies. After the release of the second the Olivia Tremor Control album, Black Foliage, the band broke up in 2000.

== Post-Olivia Tremor Control ==
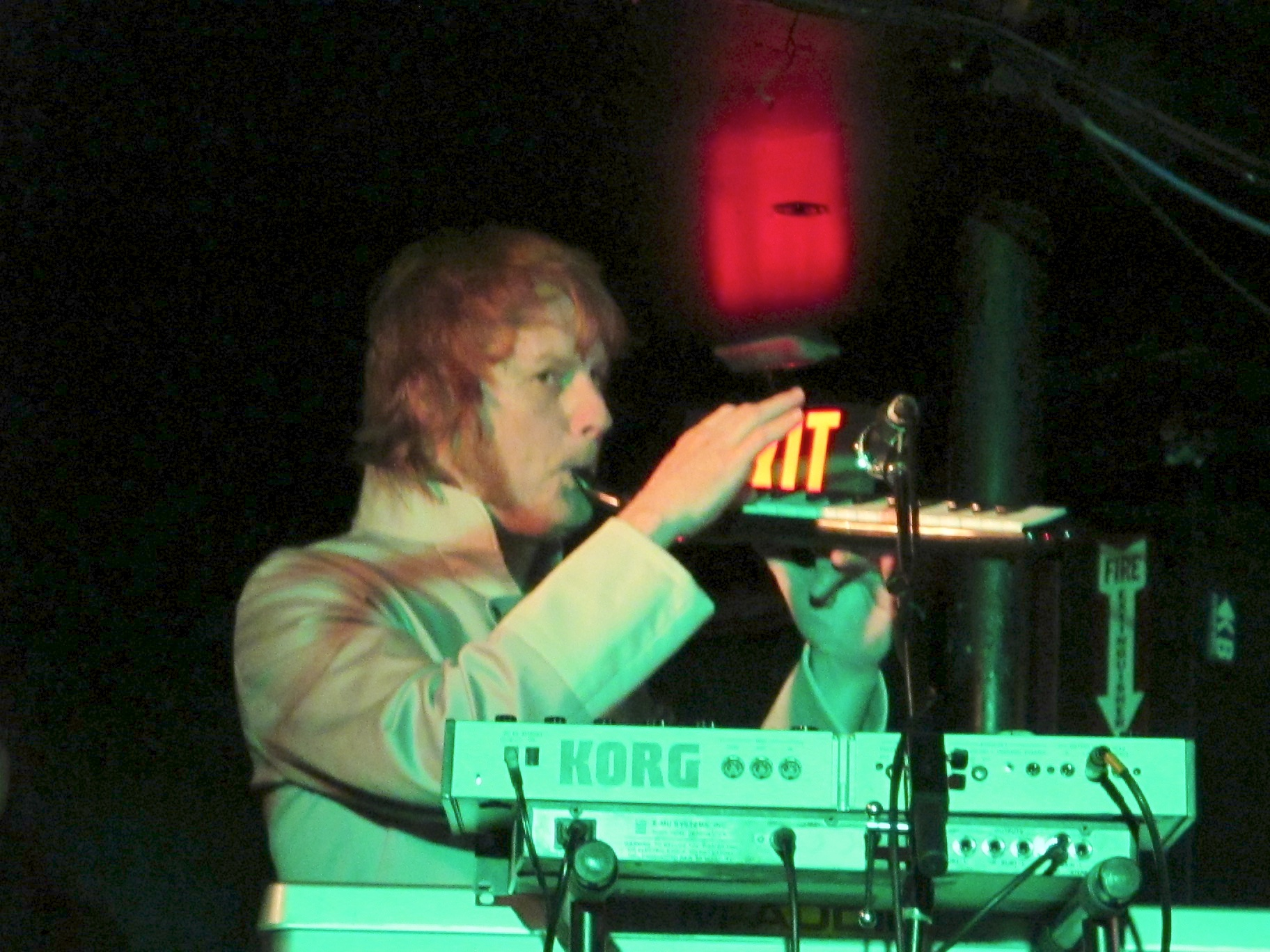
Doss performing in 2010

Doss went on to restart the Sunshine Fix. That band's first full-length album, Age of the Sun, was released in 2002. In 2004, the Sunshine Fix released its second album Green Imagination (which featured artwork and videos by Kevin Evans). Doss began touring with the Apples in Stereo in early 2006, playing keyboards. He appeared on the Apples' 2007 album New Magnetic Wonder, was listed as a full-fledged band member on the band's 2010 album Travellers in Space and Time, and contributed to the songwriting on both albums. At the time of his death, Doss was producing albums in his own studio in Athens.

== Death ==
Doss died in Athens, Georgia, as a result of an aneurysm on July 31, 2012.

== Performing discography ==
=== The Olivia Tremor Control ===
Albums

- Music From The Unrealized Film Script "Dusk At Cubist Castle" (1996)
- Explanation II: Instrumental Themes and Dream Sequences (1998)
- Black Foliage: Animation Music Volume 1 (1999)
- Those Sessions (1999)
- Singles and Beyond (2000)
- The Same Place (2026)

EPs / Singles

- California Demise (1994)
- Split with Apples in Stereo (1994)
- The Giant Day (1996)
- The Opera House (song)|The Opera House (1997)
- The Olivia Tremor Control Vs. Black Swan Network (1997)
- Jumping Fences (1998)
- Hideway (1998)

=== The Sunshine Fix ===
Albums

- A Spiraling World of Pop (Cassette Only) (1993)
- Age of the Sun (2002)
- Green Imagination (2004)

EPs / Singles

- Sunshine Fix (7") (1999)
- The Future History of a Sunshine Fix (7") (2000)
- That Ole' Sun (7") (2001)

=== Chocolate USA ===
Albums

- Smoke Machine (1994)

=== The Apples in Stereo ===
Albums

- New Magnetic Wonder (2007)
- Travellers in Space and Time (2010)

=== Red & Zeke ===
Albums Old Man From Indy Rock Mountain (2010)
