= Age of the Sun =

Studio album by the Sunshine Fix
- Released: 2002
- Genre: Indie rock, lo-fi, experimental rock
- Length: 59:29
- Label: Emperor Norton

The Sunshine Fix chronology
A Spiraling World of Pop (1993)	Age of the Sun (2002)	Green Imagination (2004)

Professional ratings
Aggregate scores
Source	Rating
Metacritic	77/100
Review scores
Source	Rating
AllMusic	4/5 stars
Pitchfork Media	(7.9/10)

Age of the Sun is the second album by the Sunshine Fix, the solo project of the Olivia Tremor Control's Bill Doss. It was released in 2002 on Emperor Norton.

== Track listing ==
1. "Age of the Sun" – 3:24
2. "Ultraviolet Orchestra" – 0:27
3. "That Ole Sun" – 3:26
4. "Everything Is Waking" – 3:49
5. "Digging to China" – 4:09
6. "A Better Way to Be" – 3:03
7. "An Illuminated Array" – 0:44
8. "See Yourself" – 3:44
9. "Inside the Nebula" – 1:21
10. "Hide in the Light" – 2:10
11. "Sail Beyond the Sunset" – 3:08
12. "A 93 Million Mile Moment" – 1:39
13. "Mr. Summer Day" – 3:50
14. "72 Years" – 2:32
15. "Cycles of Time" – 1:22
16. "Le Roi-Soleil" – 20:30
