= Si Schroeder =

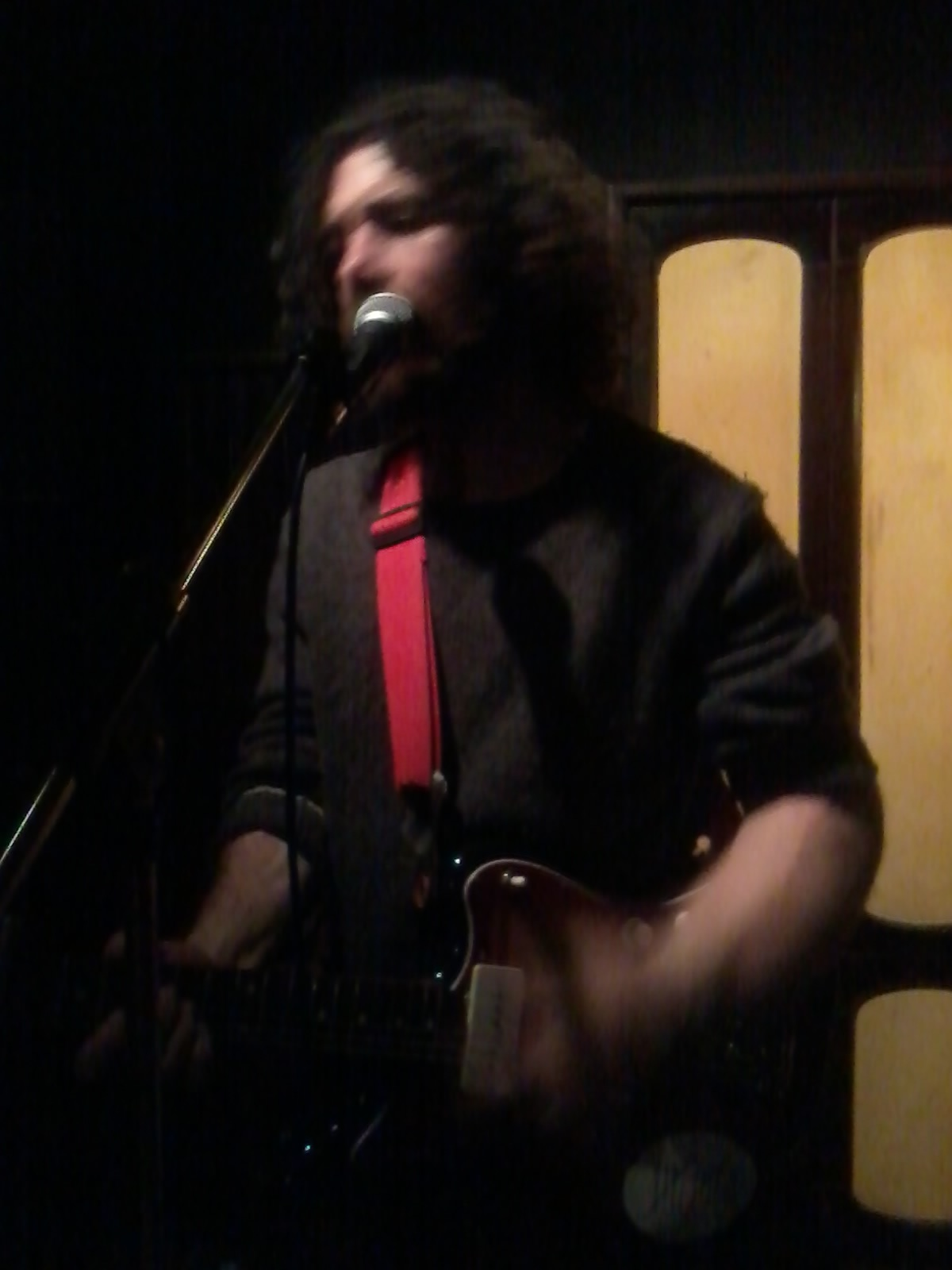
- Si Schroeder in Berlin, September 2013

Background information
- Origin: Dublin, Ireland
- Genres: Alternative rock Electronic music Experimental rock
- Occupations: Musician, singer-songwriter
- Website: http://facebook.com/pages/Si-Schroeder/33542298272

Si Schroeder (born Dublin, Ireland) is the alias of Irish music artist Simon Kenny. He has released one studio album, Coping Mechanisms, and the singles Clocked, Jump Ship, C4 and Brailowsky to date as Si (rhymes with "sigh") Schroeder.

The single Clocked was released on 1 June 2012 and is the second release from the forthcoming Si Schroeder LP Holding Patterns, following the release of the previous single Jump Ship on 22 July 2011.

Coping Mechanisms was nominated for the 2006 Choice Music Prize Irish album of the year and released on Irish independent record label Trust Me I'm A Thief. Influential Irish blogger Nialler9 named Coping Mechanisms his blog's No 1 Irish album of 2006, as did the Foggy Notions magazine.

Si Schroeder was one of four music acts selected to represent Ireland at the 2008 Eurosonic Festival held annually in Groningen.

Simon Kenny has also recorded and performed under the alias Schroedersound. Throughout most of the 1990s he was one half of Irish indie rock band Schroeder's Cat whose eponymous four-track EP was released in 1998 on the LA label Emperor Norton Records.

Si Schroeder's current band members are Mark Jordan (guitar) and Bryan O'Connell (drums). Previous band members include Ger Griffin (formerly of Rollerskate Skinny), Joss Moorkens, Jimmy Eadie and Brian Mooney (both formerly of The Idiots and Into Paradise), Kevin Brew and Fiachra Lennon. Irish electronica artist Somadrone, a.k.a. Neil O'Connor, also a member of The Redneck Manifesto, has also been part of Si Schroeder's live set-up as has Chequerboard.

Si Schroeder has performed on a number of Irish television shows including on RTÉ One's The View presented by John Kelly, RTÉ Two's Two Tube and RTÉ Two's Other Voices on which he was interviewed by BBC Radio 1 DJ Annie Mac. He has also appeared on the Airfield Sessions television programme on the now-defunct Irish television station Channel 6 presented by Irish broadcaster and model Michelle Doherty.

On 15 January 2013 he was a guest on The Dave Fanning Show on RTÉ 2fm where he played a session that included three songs – Jump Ship, Blood's The Colour and Stop – from the forthcoming album Holding Patterns.

He has been a guest of Donal Dineen on his former radio show Small Hours on Irish radio station Today FM and on the RTÉ 2XM show Radio Activity on 16 November 2012 where he played three songs, Blood's The Colour, 70s Kid and Stop, from the forthcoming LP Holding Patterns.

On 20 July 2011 he was a guest on the RTÉ Radio 1 arts show Arena where he played two songs from his forthcoming second album Holding Patterns and conducted an interview with presenter Sean Rocks. He was also a guest on former RTÉ Radio 1 programme The Arts Show on which he discussed the work of Irish visual artist James Coleman.

In January 2012, Irish music artist Sunken Foal made available a remix arrangement he created of Si Schroeder's Jump Ship.

In February 2015 Schroeder and Sunken Foal collaborated on a track entitled 'Never Knew' (music by Sunken Foal, lyrics and vocals by Schroeder).

In September 2015 Schroeder completed a score for a theatrical version of Aldous Huxley's 'Brave New World' for Theater Bonn in Germany, directed by Gavin Quinn and designed by Aedin Cosgrove, both of Pan Pan Theatre company.

== Discography ==
=== Albums ===
- Coping Mechanisms (2006)

=== Singles ===
- Clocked (2012)
- Jump Ship (2011)
- Brailowsky – Schroedersound remix (2006)
- C4 (2005)

Brailowsky – Schroedersound Remix
This is a 29-second clip from the 2006 Si Schroeder single
