= The Same Place (Olivia Tremor Control album) =

Studio album by The Olivia Tremor Control
- Released: October 23, 2026
- Recorded: 1988–2026
- Studios: World as Myth Studio; Marlborough Farms; Pixel Studio; Bel*Air Studio; Will Hart's home; Peter Erchick's home
- Genres: Neo-psychedelia; psychedelic pop; experimental
- Length: 69:52
- Label: Elephant 6 Recording Company
- Producers: Will Cullen Hart; Bill Doss; Derek Almstead; Jason NeSmith; Ron Kwasman

The Olivia Tremor Control chronology
Singles and Beyond (2000)	The Same Place (2026)

Singles from The Same Place
- 1. "The Same Place" Released: November 29, 2024; 2. "Garden of Light" Released: November 29, 2024; 3. "Advice from the Oceans" Released: August 28, 2026; 4. "Timewaster" Released: September 29, 2026

The Same Place is the third and final studio album by American neo-psychedelic band the Olivia Tremor Control. It was released October 23, 2026, through the Elephant 6 Recording Company. The album was preceded by four singles: two released in 2024 ("Garden of Light" and the title track "The Same Place"), and two released in 2026 ("Advice from the Oceans" and "Timewaster").

== Background and production ==
In 2002, Will Hart recorded parts of the title track of the album in his home following the band's disbandment in 2000. During this hiatus, Bill Doss also recorded parts of "Garden of Light" in various home studios in Athens, Georgia. In 2009, the band reunited and began recording new music for a third studio album; however, Doss died in 2012. Hart later confirmed that much of the third album's material had been recorded and that it would be the band's final album.

Hart died of a heart attack on November 29, 2024, the same day that the band had released the album's first two singles.

Derek Almstead, Jason NeSmith, and Ron Kwasman produced the album and on July 17, 2026, officially announced the title and track listing of The Same Place.

== Art ==
The album's art was created by Will Cullen Hart and Kelly Hart, along with an additional drawing by Bill Doss. It is a combined version of the covers of the band's first two albums, Dusk at Cubist Castle and Black Foliage: Animation Music Volume One.

== Release ==
The album released on October 23, 2026.

On an episode of NPR Music, parts of songs from the album were played before their release, such as "Begin Now!" and "The Path of the Parallels Suite: VI. Last Occupants".

== Track listing ==
No.	Title	Length
1.	"Begin Now!"	2:15
2.	"Advice from the Oceans"	2:57
3.	"Timewaster"	2:33
4.	"The Spinning Continuous"	6:24
5.	"The Same Old Place"	3:08
6.	"A Useful Planet, Partially Yellow"	0:20
7.	"We Captured a Frame"	4:13
8.	"Meeting Ourselves"	3:17
9.	"Striping the Orchestra"	0:04
10.	"½ Way Down"	3:45
11.	"Now Begin"	3:11
12.	"Have We Come Around"	0:23
13.	"California Demise 4"	2:15
14.	"The Path of the Parallels Suite: I. Follow the Path"	1:07
15.	"The Path of the Parallels Suite: II. It's Obvious"	4:38
16.	"The Path of the Parallels Suite: III. A River of White"	3:47
17.	"The Path of the Parallels Suite: IV. Membraned Wings"	1:38
18.	"The Path of the Parallels Suite: V. Universe Café"	1:26
19.	"The Path of the Parallels Suite: VI. Last Occupants"	1:34
20.	"The Path of the Parallels Suite: VII. The Same Place"	3:15
21.	"Leaf"	2:58
22.	"Seen It All"	0:47
23.	"Garden of Light"	3:44
24.	"It's Not Impossible for Golden Times"	2:28
25.	"Mirrors Hear Us"	0:26
26.	"Impressions Through the Ring"	3:22
27.	"Fossil Faun"	3:27
Total length:		69:52

== Personnel ==
Credits are adapted from the album's liner notes.

The Olivia Tremor Control

- Will Cullen Hart – all artwork, album design, producer, vocals (1–3, 7, 8, 10, 12–16, 19, 20, 22–24, 26, 27), lead vocals (4), guitar (1, 3, 6, 11, 14–16, 18, 20, 22, 24, 26, 27), sound effects (1, 8, 18, 21), "arpeggio acoustic guitar" (2), percussion (3–7, 10, 11, 14–20, 22–24, 27), handclaps (5, 7, 23), drums (6, 14, 15, 18, 27), "distant drums" (11), tape effects (11), mix (12, 15, 16, 18, 24, 25), "everything else" (12), flute (14–16), toys (14), bells (15), processed drums (16), acoustic guitar (20), electric guitar (20), keyboards (20, 25), "boatman" (20), "delay puddles" (23), whispers (23), slide guitar (24), vocal effects (27)
- Bill Doss – "one drawing on the lyrics page", producer, vocals (1–3, 5, 7, 10, 13, 15, 16, 18, 21, 26, 27), acoustic guitar (2–4, 10, 13, 20, 23, 24), bass guitar (2, 4, 5, 7, 21), Jaymar (2), electric guitar (3, 13, 21, 23), percussion (3, 5, 23), 12-string electric guitar (4), mix (5, 10, 17, 18), organ (5, 9), guitar (5, 14–18, 27), handclaps (5, 23), fuzz guitar (7), xylophone (9, 10, 20, 26), keyboards (10, 13, 17, 27), Mellotron (13, 21), "boatman" (20), piano (20, 21), nylon-string guitar (21), melodica (27)
- John Fernandes – bass guitar (1), violin (2, 4, 7, 10, 13–16, 23, 27), bass clarinet (2, 4, 5, 8, 10, 26), clarinet (2–5, 8, 10, 16, 17, 20, 23, 24, 26), handclaps (5, 23), vocals (7, 23), "boatman" (20), percussion (23)
- Peter Erchick – organ (1, 8, 11, 13, 27), piano (2, 5, 7, 8, 11, 20, 23, 24, 26), vocals (3–5, 7, 10, 11, 23), bass guitar (4, 13, 21, 22, 26), "fuzz organ" (4), handclaps (5, 11, 23), synth (11, 13, 23), guitar (11), "beeps" (16), "boatman" (20), keyboards (20)
- Eric Harris – drums (2, 7, 21, 23), handclaps (2), percussion (5, 23), "tremolo piano" (5), sound effects (5), "The Magic Tape Organ" (10), Casio (20), harmonica (20), "boatman" (20), vocals (23), "distorted Casio" (24)

Additional musicians

- AJ Griffin – vocals (1, 5, 23, 24), Casio (5), handclaps (5, 23), piano (10, 24, 26), guitar (14, 15), "drum jam" (16), acoustic guitar (23), electric guitar (23), organ (27)
- Andrew Rieger – vocals (24)
- Bee Jetter – vocals (15)
- Brian Vesey – trumpet (2, 26)
- Chris Costigan – alto saxophone (10)
- Derek Almstead – producer, mix (1, 3, 4, 12, 14–16, 19, 20, 24–27) drums (1, 4, 8, 13–15, 20, 24, 26, 27), "filter guitar" (1), bells (1), "auxiliary drums" (2, 7, 16), tambourine (2), electric guitar (2, 8, 20, 23), bass guitar (3–5, 9, 10, 12, 14–16, 20, 23–27), percussion (3, 5, 11, 20, 23), keyboards (4), guitar (4), vocals (4, 5, 7, 23), Mellotron (4), fuzz guitar (5), bells (5), sound effects (18), acoustic guitar (20), "piano delays" (20), "boatman" (20), mandolin (21), handclaps (23)
- Emily Growden – vocals (1, 5)
- Gabrielle Daniels – percussion (7)
- Hannah Jones – "auxiliary drums" (1), intro drums (4)
- Heather McIntosh – cello (1, 4, 11, 16, 20, 22, 23, 26), bass guitar (8), upright bass (20)
- Ian Werden – drums (10)
- Jason NeSmith – producer, mix (2, 4, 5, 7, 8, 10, 11, 13–17, 19–24, 26, 27), horn arrangement (3), vocals (5, 15, 19, 23), xylophone (5), handclaps (5, 11), "dream drone" (7), electric guitar (8), tapes (8), "heartbeat bass drum" (11), keyboards (13, 16), noises (14), percussion (15, 16), "beeps" (16), sound effects (18), paper rip (19), drums (20), piano (20, 22, 23), Moog bass (24), vocal arrangement (24)
- J. Kirk Pleasant – trombone (3)
- Jeff Crouch – trumpet
- Jeff Mangum – drums (3), vocals (5), handclaps (5)
- Jeremy Kiran Fernandes – percussion (7)
- Kelly Hart – album design, flute (4)
- Kevin Evans – "stream of consciousness" (2)
- Kevin Sweeney – electric guitar (3, 10)
- Marc Gilley – tenor saxophone (10)
- Patrick Hargon – electric guitar (10), acoustic guitar (13)
- Peter Alvanos – drums (8)
- Robbee Cucchiaro – trumpet (3), French horn (21), flugelhorn (21)
- Robert Schneider – co-producer, reverbs (13), noises (13), cowbell (23), vocals (23)
- Ron Kwasman – co-producer, electric guitar (3), guitar (4, 22)
- Scott Spillane – brass instruments (16, 24)
- Steven Trimmer – finger-picked Yamaha 12-string (20), Martin D-15 mahogany acoustic guitar (20)
- Will Westbrook – sound effects (5)
- "Golden Times Chorus":
  - Andy Gonzales
  - Bryan Poole
  - Davey Wrathgabar
  - David Barbe
  - Derek Almstead
  - Emily Growden
  - Hilarie Bratset
  - Jamey Huggins
  - Jason NeSmith
  - Kay Stanton
  - Laura Carter
  - Peter Alvanos
  - Pete Erchick
  - Tammy Ealom

== Charts ==
Chart performance for The Same Place
Chart (2026)	Peak position
UK Album Downloads (Official Charts)	63
