= Roomic Cube =

Studio album by Takako Minekawa
- Released: May 25, 1996
- Studio: Take One (Tokyo)
- Genre: Shibuya-kei
- Length: 41:53
- Label: Polystar
- Producer: Buffalo Daughter

Takako Minekawa chronology
| (A Little Touch Of) Baroque in Winter (1995) | Roomic Cube (1996) | Athletica (1997) |

Roomic Cube (subtitled ...A Tiny Room Exhibition) is the second studio album by Japanese musician Takako Minekawa. It was released on May 25, 1996, by Polystar. The album was released in the United States on February 18, 1997, by March Records.

Recubed, an EP consisting of remixes of tracks from Roomic Cube, was released by March and Emperor Norton Records on July 7, 1998. The Roomic Cube track "Fantastic Cat" came to prominence in 2006 when it was featured in a Miller Brewing Company beer advertisement featuring a man on a bicycle descending down a hill.

== Critical reception ==
Professional ratings
Review scores
| Source | Rating |
|---|---|
| AllMusic | 4.5/5 stars |
| Pitchfork | 7.6/10 |

In 2011, Roomic Cube was included in LA Weekly's "beginner's guide" to Shibuya-kei music.

== Track listing ==
| No. | Title | Writer(s) | Length |
|---|---|---|---|
| 1. | "Sleep Song" | Takako Minekawa | 3:01 |
| 2. | "Fantastic Cat" | Minekawa | 3:58 |
| 3. | "Never/More" | Minekawa; Motoko Kajiwara; Yumiko Ohno; Sugar Yoshinaga | 4:17 |
| 4. | "Klaxon!" | Ohno; Moog Yamamoto; Yoshinaga | 4:28 |
| 5. | "Wooooog" | Ohno; Yoshinaga | 3:53 |
| 6. | "Dessert Song" | Minekawa; Ohno; Yoshinaga | 2:59 |
| 7. | "Destron" | Minekawa; Kilimnik | 3:57 |
| 8. | "Pop Up Squirrels" | Minekawa; Ohno; Yoshinaga | 0:27 |
| 9. | "1.666666" | Minekawa; Ohno; Yoshinaga | 6:24 |
| 10. | "Rainy Song" | Minekawa | 2:19 |
| 11. | "T.T.T. (Turntable Tennis)" | Minekawa; Ohno; Yamamoto; Yoshinaga | 2:05 |
| 12. | "Black... White" | Pierre Bachelet | 3:16 |
| 13. | "More Pop Up Squirrels" | Minekawa; Ohno; Yoshinaga | 0:49 |
| Total length: | | | 41:53 |

== Personnel ==
Credits are adapted from the album's liner notes.

- Takako Minekawa – performance, arrangement
- Buffalo Daughter – performance, arrangement, production
- Kenichi Makimura – executive production
- Tadashi Matsuda – mixing, recording
- Takeo Ogiso – photography
- Megumi Shigetomi – mastering
