= Fun 9 =

Studio album by Takako Minekawa
- Released: July 7, 1999
- Studio: Burning Trailer
- Genres: Shibuya-kei; art pop; electropop
- Length: 36:17
- Label: Polystar
- Producers: Takako Minekawa; DJ Me DJ You; Keigo Oyamada

Takako Minekawa chronology
Ximer... C.C.C. Remix (1998)	Fun 9 (1999)	Maxi On (2000)

Alternative cover
- Emperor Norton issue

Fun 9 is the fourth studio album by Japanese musician Takako Minekawa. It was released on July 7, 1999 by Polystar. The album was released on November 16, 1999 in the United States by Emperor Norton Records.

The album's title is pronounced "fun-kyū", the latter half of the title referring to the Japanese equivalent of the numeral 9, and is intended to sound similar to the word "funk".

== Critical reception ==
Professional ratings
Review scores
Source	Rating
AllMusic	4.5/5 stars
Alternative Press	4/5
The Baltimore Sun	3/4 stars
Pitchfork	8.3/10
Uncut	3.5/5 stars

Heather Phares of AllMusic wrote that Minekawa had produced a "more eclectic and polished" record while retaining her "playful musical vision", crafting "a wide array of lush, lighthearted songs into an album that is as self-assured as it is fun".

Drowned in Sound writer Samuel Rosean cited Fun 9 as a key Shibuya-kei release in a 2018 retrospective article. Tokyo Weekender's Ed Cunningham recommended Fun 9 to fans of the Cornelius album Fantasma (1997).

== Track listing ==
No.	Title	Writer(s)	Length
1.	"Gently Waves"	Takako Minekawa	1:50
2.	"Plash"	Minekawa; Keigo Oyamada	4:11
3.	"Flow in a Tide" (フィーチャリング)	Minekawa; Michiko Endo	3:42
4.	"Fantastic Voyage"	Minekawa; DJ Me DJ You	4:56
5.	"Tiger"	Minekawa; DJ Me DJ You	4:46
6.	"Shh Song"	Minekawa	1:52
7.	"Spin Spider Spin"	Minekawa; Oyamada	2:56
8.	"Flash"	Minekawa; Oyamada	1:21
9.	"Fun 9 (French)"	Minekawa	0:09
10.	"Soft Graffiti"	Minekawa; Endo	4:58
11.	"Fancy Work Funk"	Minekawa; DJ Me DJ You	5:36
Total length:			36:17

US edition bonus track
No.	Title	Writer(s)	Length
12.	"Etoufée"	Minekawa; Oyamada	2:53
Total length:			39:10

== Personnel ==
Credits are adapted from the album's liner notes.

Musicians

- Takako Minekawa – vocals, acoustic guitar, guitar, turntables, arrangement
- Craig Borrell – analog synthesizer, MTI Auto-Orchestra synthesizer, trumpet, turntables, vocals, backing vocals
- Michiko Endo – additional vocals on "Flow in a Tide", acoustic guitar on "Soft Graffiti"
- Ross Harris – analog synthesizer, bass, Boss SP-303 sampler, drum machine, guitar, turntables
- Toyoaki Misha – sound manipulation
- Keigo Oyamada – acoustic guitar, bass, drums, guitar, Stylophone keyboard, turntables
- Takahiro Unno – French horn on "Spin Spider Spin"

Production

- Takako Minekawa – production
- DJ Me DJ You – production
- Tadashi Matsuda – mixing, recording
- Michifumi Onodera – mixing
- Keigo Oyamada – production
- Tohru Takayama – mixing
