= The Sunshine Fix =

American indie rock band

- Origin: Athens, Georgia, US
- Genres: Indie rock; experimental rock
- Years active: 1993; 2000–2012
- Labels: Elephant 6; Kindercore; spinART; Emperor Norton
- Past members: Bill Doss; Kevin Sweeney; Sam Mixon; Dave Gerow

The Sunshine Fix was an American indie rock group that released three albums from 1993 to 2004. Their main singer and songwriter was Bill Doss, known from the Olivia Tremor Control. The name predated the Olivia Tremor Control and remained in use until Doss's 2012 death.

== History ==
Doss started the project while in high school, and self-released an album on cassette called A Spiraling World of Pop, later re-released under the Elephant Six banner. Doss then met up with Will Cullen Hart and Jeff Mangum; together, they formed the Olivia Tremor Control, and the Sunshine Fix moniker was put into hiatus (although, as an aside, it became the title of an Olivia Tremor Control song, which appears on the Singles and Beyond compilation).

Following the dismantling of Olivia Tremor Control in 2000, Doss began recording under the Sunshine Fix name again, releasing a single and preparing an EP, which was released by Kindercore Records in 2000, featuring members of the Olivia Tremor Control, Of Montreal, Elf Power, and others.

In 2001, Doss formed a more stable band, adding Kevin Sweeney and Sam Mixon, and released Age of the Sun on Emperor Norton Records. A tour with the Four Corners followed. In 2001, drummer Dave Gerow joined the fray to tour in support of Age of the Sun with acts like Guster, Ugly Casanova, and Sloan. They continued touring and recorded Green Imagination at the home of Widespread Panic bassist Dave Schools and mixed by Andy Baker at The Bakery in Athens, Georgia. Green Imagination was released on SpinART Records in 2004. Although the record received a generally muted critical reception, the band continued to tour in its support. Doss continued to record songs for a new Sunshine Fix album until his death. He had said that the new material has a darker direction - "more Leonard Cohen than John Lennon".

== Discography ==
The Sunshine Fix released albums and EPs on a variety of record labels.

=== Albums ===
- A Spiraling World of Pop (Elephant 6; cassette; 1993)
- Age of the Sun (Emperor Norton/Kindercore; CD; 2001)
- Green Imagination (spinART Records; CD; 2004)

=== EPs and singles ===
- Sunshine Fix EP (Elephant 6; 7"; 1999)
- The Future History of a Sunshine Fix (Kindercore; CD; 2000)
- That Ole Sun (Emperor Norton; 7"; 2001
- Happy Happy Birthday to Me Singles Club Single No. 13 (Split w/Always Red Society) (HHBtM Records; 7"; 2009)

=== Compilation appearances ===
- "Friends Win" on The Powerpuff Girls: Heroes And Villains (Rhino; CD; 2000)
- "Currency Exchange Communion" on U.S. Pop Life, Volume 5 - Athens: The Invention to be Nobody & Nowhere (Contact; CD; 2000)
- "Ordinary Extraordinary" on Kindercore Fifty (Kindercore; CD; 2000)
- "Sounds Around You" on Beikoku Ongaku Vol.16 (Beikoku Ongaku; CD; 2000)
