= Chat Chat =

Studio album by Takako Minekawa
- Released: June 25, 1995
- Studio: Alfa Studio A (Tokyo); Music Inn (Tokyo); Think Sync (Tokyo)
- Genre: Shibuya-kei
- Length: 51:37
- Label: Polystar
- Producer: Takako Minekawa; Kenichi Makimura; Daiji Okai

Takako Minekawa chronology
Chat Chat (1995)	(A Little Touch Of) Baroque in Winter (1995)

Professional ratings
Review scores
Source	Rating
AllMusic	3/5 stars

Chat Chat is the debut studio album by Japanese musician Takako Minekawa, released on June 25, 1995, by Polystar.

== Track listing ==
No.	Title	Writer(s)	Length
1.	"I Love" (Tom T. Hall cover)	Hall	2:30
2.	"Summertime Blues" (Eddie Cochran cover)	Cochran; Jerry Capehart	4:35
3.	"Kaze no Tani no Nausicaä" (風の谷のナウシカ, Narumi Yasuda cover)	Haruomi Hosono; Takashi Matsumoto	4:22
4.	"Clover"	Takako Minekawa	5:28
5.	"Moonlight Shadow" (Mike Oldfield cover)	Oldfield	5:09
6.	"My Love" (Susan cover)	Peter Barakan; Yukihiro Takahashi	6:54
7.	"Drive My Car" (The Beatles cover)	John Lennon; Paul McCartney	2:08
8.	"Gotta Pull Myself Together" (The Nolans cover)	Ben Findon; Mike Myers; Bob Puzey	4:38
9.	"Circling Times Square" (originally recorded by Minekawa's band L⇔R)	Minekawa	5:09
10.	"I Love (Instrument)"	Hall	2:30
11.	"Mimi"	Minekawa	4:01
12.	"Love" (Victoria Williams cover)	Williams	4:13
Total length:			51:37

== Personnel ==
Credits are adapted from the album's liner notes.

Musicians

- Takako Minekawa – vocals, guitar, keyboards, toy instruments
- Takashi Furuta – drums
- Yoshie Hiragakura – drums, percussion
- Kōji Kurumatani – guitars
- Takamune Negishi – bass
- Hirofumi Tokutake – acoustic guitar, electric guitar
- Hitoshi Watanabe – acoustic bass, acoustic guitar, cello, mandolin, percussion, ukulele, arrangement
- Eiji Yoshikawa – keyboards, sound manipulation, arrangement
- Toben Yukawa – arrangement

Production

- Takako Minekawa – production
- Kenichi Makimura – production
- Masao Nakazato – mastering
- Daiji Okai – production
- Hiroshi Saisu – mixing, recording
- Yasuhiko Terada – mixing, recording

Design

- Takako Minekawa – art direction
- Mach5 Go! – design
- Yuji Shiba – photography
