= Maxi On =

EP by Takako Minekawa
- Released: July 12, 2000
- Genre: Electropop
- Length: 23:13
- Label: Trattoria
- Producer: Takako Minekawa; Dymaxion

Takako Minekawa chronology
Fun 9 (1999)	Maxi On (2000)	Toropical Circle (2013)

Professional ratings
Aggregate scores
Source	Rating
Metacritic	82/100
Review scores
Source	Rating
AllMusic	3/5 stars
Pitchfork	8.3/10

Maxi On is an EP by Japanese musician Takako Minekawa. It was released on July 12, 2000 by Trattoria Records. In the United States, it was released on November 14, 2000 by Emperor Norton Records. The EP is a collaboration with American indie rock band Dymaxion.

== Track listing ==
No.	Title	Writer(s)	Length
1.	"Maxi On!"	Takako Minekawa; Dymaxion	2:46
2.	"Lullaby of Gray"	Minekawa; Dymaxion	3:44
3.	"A Report on an Investigation"	Minekawa; Dymaxion	4:53
4.	"Brioche"	Minekawa; Dymaxion	1:43
5.	"Picnic at Loose Rock"	Minekawa	5:45
6.	"Follow My Dreams"	Minekawa	4:22
Total length:			23:13

US edition bonus track
No.	Title	Writer(s)	Length
7.	"Sleeping Bag"	Minekawa	5:24
Total length:			28:37

== Personnel ==
Credits are adapted from the EP's liner notes.

- Takako Minekawa – performance (including acoustic guitar on "Follow My Dreams"), arrangement, production
- Ricky Domen – coordination of US recording sessions
- Dymaxion – performance, arrangement, production
- Mitsuo Koike – mastering
- Kenichi Makimura – executive production
- Shigeki Nakamura – mixing
- Jeremy Novak – bass on "Maxi On!" and "Lullaby of Gray"
- Nobuyuki Ohhashi – bass on "Lullaby of Gray"
- Makoto Ohrui – art direction, design
- Akihiro Ohshima – whistle on "Lullaby of Gray", engineering, recording
- Keigo Oyamada – electric guitar, electric sitar, and string harmonics on "Follow My Dreams"
