= Coping Mechanisms =

Coping Mechanism(s) may refer to:

- Coping Mechanism (album)
- Coping Mechanisms (Si Schroeder album)
- Coping Mechanisms (Tayla Parx album)
- Coping mechanisms
