= Cloudy Cloud Calculator =

Studio album by Takako Minekawa
- Released: December 10, 1997
- Studios: Omega Sound (Osaka); Phonobaloon Laundry
- Genres: Shibuya-kei; electropop
- Length: 37:57
- Label: Polystar
- Producers: Takako Minekawa; Seiichi Yamamoto; Sugar Yoshinaga

Takako Minekawa chronology
Athletica (1997)	Cloudy Cloud Calculator (1997)	Recubed (1998)

Cloudy Cloud Calculator is the third studio album by Japanese musician Takako Minekawa. It was released on December 10, 1997 by Polystar. The album was released in the United States on November 17, 1998 by Emperor Norton Records. Minekawa played almost every instrument on the album and wrote, produced and arranged nearly all its songs.

Minekawa toured in the United States to support the album. The EP Ximer... C.C.C. Remix, released on September 23, 1998 by Polystar, features remixes of tracks from Cloudy Cloud Calculator by various artists.

== Critical reception ==
Professional ratings
Review scores
Source	Rating
AllMusic	4/5 stars
The Baltimore Sun	3.5/4 stars
Pitchfork	6.7/10

Heather Phares of AllMusic described Cloudy Cloud Calculator as one of Minekawa's "finest and most unusual moments" and "highly inventive, restrained pop". Christian Bruno, writing in Metro, referred to the album's songs as "wonderfully cute, all-synthesizer musings".

== Track listing ==
All tracks are written by Takako Minekawa, except where noted.

No.	Title	Writer(s)	Length
1.	"Micro Mini Cool"		2:53
2.	"Milk Rock"		3:45
3.	"Phonobaloon Song"		2:32
4.	"Cat House"		3:41
5.	"Cloud Chips"	Minekawa; Sugar Yoshinaga	2:10
6.	"Kraftpark (Micro Trip Edit)"		2:58
7.	"Kangaroo Pocket Calculator"		3:45
8.	"Black Forest"	Minekawa; Silvie TV Game	3:41
9.	"International Velvet"		3:20
10.	"Cloud Cuckoo Land"	Minekawa; Plain Vanilla	4:59
11.	"Telstar"	Joe Meek	4:13
Total length:			37:57

== Personnel ==
Credits are adapted from the album's liner notes.

Musicians

- Takako Minekawa – vocals, acoustic guitar, bass, drums, electric guitar, electronic drums (Yamaha DD-7, E-mu SP-1200), güiro, recorder, synthesizer (Boss SYB-3, Casio SA-1, Casio VA-10, Minimoog Voyager, Moog Prodigy, Roland CR-5000, Six-Trak), vocoder, arrangement
- Yuko Aiso – violin
- Yumiko Ohno – bass, maracas, synthesizer (Minimoog), theremin
- Atsushi Tsuyama – drums
- Mooog Yamamoto – turntables, "bird call"
- Seiichi Yamamoto – acoustic guitar, electric bass, electric guitar, electronic drums, synthesizer (Roland JP-8000), arrangement
- Masaaki Yoshida – synthesizer
- Sugar Yoshinaga – arrangement

Production

- Takako Minekawa – production
- Tetsuya Kotani – engineering
- Masao Nakazato – mastering
- Seiichi Yamamoto – mixing, production
- Sugar Yoshinaga – production

Design

- Sheila Sachs – design
- Chikashi Suzuki – photography
- Mariko Yamamoto – art direction, design
- Mooog Yamamoto – art direction, design
