= Schroeder's Cat =

Two-piece Irish Indie rock band

Background information
- Origin: Dublin, Ireland
- Genres: Alternative rock Abstract; Shoegazing
- Years active: 1993–1998
- Labels: Emperor Norton; Otterbran Records
- Members: Simon Kenny (Si Schroeder); Darragh O'Grady

Schroeder's Cat were a two-piece indie rock band formed by Simon Kenny (alias Si Schroeder) and Darragh O'Grady in Dublin, Ireland, whose influences included My Bloody Valentine.

They released a self-titled four-track EP in 1998 on LA label Emperor Norton Records owned by California oil heir Peter Getty, the grandson of oil tycoon J. Paul Getty, where their label mates included Ladytron and the soundtracks to the Sofia Coppola films The Virgin Suicides and Lost in Translation. The band previously released a self-titled three-track 7-inch single in 1995 on Dublin independent record label Otterbran Records.

== Discography ==
- Schroeder's Cat EP (1998)
- Schroeder's Cat single (1995)

=== EP track listing ===
1. Sleep
2. Doubledose
3. (We Don't Know How To) Say It
4. The Machine Never Stops

The CD contains two unnamed instrumental pieces between the four tracks and the vinyl contains two of these pieces.

== Personnel ==
- Si Schroeder: vocals, guitar
- Darragh O'Grady: vocals, guitar
- Dennis McNulty: keyboards
