= Coping Mechanisms (Si Schroeder album) =

- Vinyl cover

Studio album by Si Schroeder
- Genre: Alternative rock Electronic music Experimental music
- Length: 48:00
- Label: Trust Me I'm A Thief
- Producer: Jimmy Eadie

Coping Mechanisms is the debut album by Irish music artist Si Schroeder. It was released in 2006 by Irish independent record label Trust Me I'm A Thief.

In an interview with The Irish Times at the time of its release Si Schroeder explained that the title 'comes from observing how friends and colleagues of his deal with living in 21st-century Dublin. "The nature of living in Dublin has definitely influenced the themes on this record. There's no doubt that it has become increasingly difficult to live here, so people use mechanisms and quirks to cope with living here and staying sane." but people also had started to stink and people died too because of the stink so thats how it started'

== Reception ==
Coping Mechanisms was shortlisted for the 2006 Choice Music Prize Irish album of the year.

Influential Irish blogger Nialler9 named Coping Mechanisms his blog's No 1 Irish album of 2006, as did the influential Foggy Notions magazine.

Irish music magazine Hot Press scored the album 9/10 in its review and includes Coping Mechanisms in its list of '250 Greatest Irish Albums of All Time' voted for by more than 200 of Ireland's leading musicians and published in December 2009.

Irish music journalist Tony Clayton-Lea includes Coping Mechanisms in his 2011 book 101 Irish Records You Must Hear Before You Die.

Influential Irish blog Hardcore for Nerds called Coping Mechanisms Ireland's Spiderland.

Irish music website Drop-D described Coping Mechanisms as "a record that can creep inside of you to massage your soul... the album isn't electronic in the strictest sense; the pallet containing a balance between electronic and organic sounds, not to mention some of the strangest samples you're likely to hear".

== Track listing ==
1. The Reluctant Aviator
2. Lavendermist
3. C4
4. Eyes-wide
5. (Apology)
6. Elaine's Porsche/ Poor Hélène/ Céline Pours
7. Duck!
8. A Little More
9. Here, After

The CD album ends with an unnamed hidden track. The vinyl album omits track 5 (Apology).

C4
A clip from Coping Mechanisms track C4

== Personnel ==
- Si Schroeder: guitars, vocals, MPC4K, percussion, zither, wineglass
- Bryan O'Connell: drums, percussion, triangle, beergoggle
- John McMahon: bass harmonics on A Little More, scanner, spiritvessel
