= Takako Minekawa =

Japanese musician and writer (born 1969)

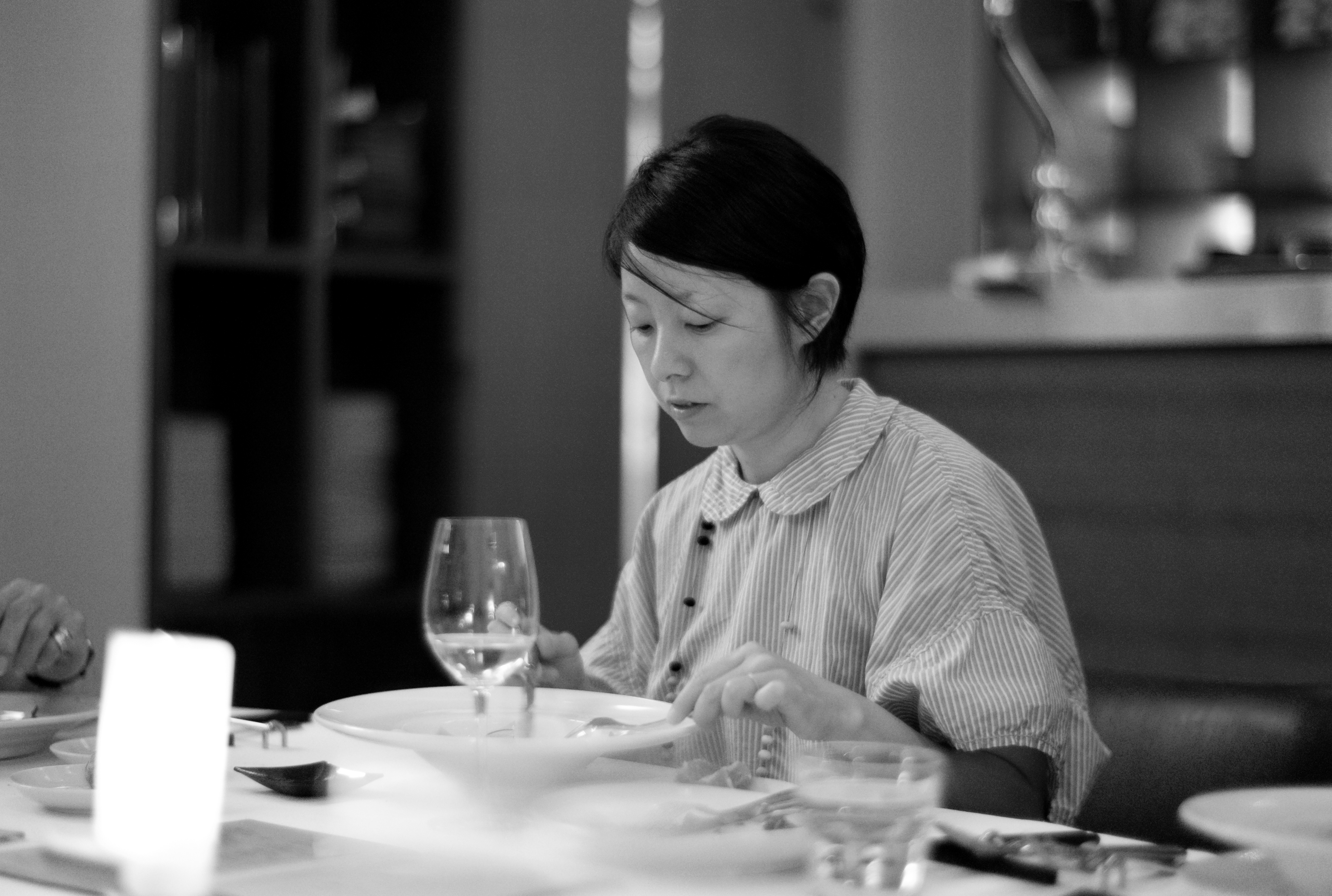
- Minekawa in 2007

Background information
- Also known as: Mamene Kirerie
- Born: June 3, 1969 (age 57)
- Origin: Japan
- Genres: Shibuya-kei; electropop
- Occupations: Musician; singer; songwriter
- Instruments: Synthesizer; guitar
- Years active: 1990–present
- Labels: Umor Rex; Thrill Jockey; Plancha; Polystar; Emperor Norton; March

Takako Minekawa (嶺川貴子, Minekawa Takako; born June 3, 1969) is a Japanese musician, singer, songwriter, and writer.

== Career ==
In her childhood, Minekawa acted in film and television. Minekawa's first musical venture was playing in Lolita, a band she formed with several college friends. She then performed under the alias Mamene Kirerie in the duo Fancy Face Groovy Name with Kahimi Karie, backed by Flipper's Guitar. Minekawa debuted as a solo performer in 1995 with the release of her first album Chat Chat by the Japanese label Polystar, followed later in the year by the EP (A Little Touch Of) Baroque in Winter.

With her second studio album, Roomic Cube (1996), Minekawa began pursuing a more refined musical style rooted in influences from bossa nova, French pop music and experimental electronic music. It increased her popularity in Japan, while also crossing over to listeners in North America, where it received airplay on college radio stations. She released her third studio album Cloudy Cloud Calculator in 1997. The EPs Recubed and Ximer... C.C.C. Remix, consisting of remixes of tracks from Roomic Cube and Cloudy Cloud Calculator respectively, were released in 1998. 1999 saw the release of Minekawa's fourth studio album Fun 9, which featured prominent contributions from her then-partner Cornelius.

In 2000, Minekawa released the EP Maxi On, a collaboration with American experimental pop band Dymaxion, after which she took an extended break from her musical career. After a 13-year hiatus, Minekawa recorded a new album, Toropical Circle, with collaborator Dustin Wong, which was released in 2013. Minekawa and Wong released two subsequent collaborative albums, Savage Imagination (2014) and Are Euphoria (2017). The duo also collaborated with American experimental music band Good Willsmith on the album Exit Future Heart, recorded in Chicago and released in 2018.

== Musical style and influences ==
Minekawa's musical skills set her firmly outside of the J-pop "idol" tradition: she writes and composes most of her own material, singing about subjects such as clouds, cats, and the color white (her personal favorite). Her love of electronic music pioneers, such as Kraftwerk, as well as French pop music can be seen in her unique experimental sound. She often makes use of vintage Casio keyboards and analog Moog synthesizers, as well as vocoders and other electronic instruments.

Minekawa's musical influences are varied. Some of her favorite French artists include Françoise Hardy and Pierre Bachelet. The influence of the British band Stereolab can also be heard in her music, and there are touches of humor in her lyrics and tone. She also enjoys Krautrock, particularly the earlier works of Kraftwerk, to whom she dedicated the song Kraftpark! Minekawa explained her admiration for the band in an interview: "I decided to describe the landscape of Kraftpark with sound and narration. This song is not a parody of Kraftwerk. I did it because I love them!" Another influence is Yellow Magic Orchestra member Haruomi Hosono, whom she paid tribute to with cover versions of his song "Kaze no Tani no Nausicaa" (1984) in 1995 and again in 2007 with Ryuichi Sakamoto.

== Other ventures ==
Minekawa has written professionally as a regular columnist for the Japanese edition of Keyboard magazine. She also contributed a serialized novel to the Japanese quarterly Bungei.

== Personal life ==
Minekawa married fellow musician Keigo Oyamada (a.k.a. Cornelius) in 2000. They divorced in 2012. Together they have one son, Milo. Minekawa and Cornelius have collaborated on several projects, including a remix of Minekawa's Cloudy Cloud Calculator track "Milk Rock", and several tracks on Minekawa's album Fun 9.

== Discography ==
Studio albums

- Chat Chat (1995)
- Roomic Cube (1996)
- Cloudy Cloud Calculator (1997)
- Fun 9 (1999)
- Toropical Circle (with Dustin Wong) (2013)
- Savage Imagination (with Dustin Wong) (2014)
- Are Euphoria (with Dustin Wong) (2017)
- Exit Future Heart (with Dustin Wong and Good Willsmith) (2018)
- Traces of the ceiling (2025)

Extended plays

- (A Little Touch Of) Baroque in Winter (1995)
- Athletica (1997)
- Recubed (1998)
- Ximer... C.C.C. Remix (1998)
- Maxi On (2000)
- Kannazuki (with Haco, Dustin Wong and Tarnovski) (2019)
