= Athletica =

EP by Takako Minekawa
- Released: February 26, 1997
- Genre: Shibuya-kei
- Label: Polystar
- Producers: Asteroid Desert Songs, Buffalo Daughter

Takako Minekawa chronology
Roomic Cube (1996)	Athletica (1997)	Cloudy Cloud Calculator (1997)

Athletica is a 1997 EP by Takako Minekawa.

The Japanese-only release was recorded between Roomic Cube and Cloudy Cloud Calculator. The sound is similar to those records, but more experimental. The Athletica EP also has another version of "Fabie", but it's pretty different, this one having beats reminiscent of early '80s hip-hop, complete with TR-808 beats. For this EP, Takako enlisted the help of ex-A.D.S. (Asteroid Desert Songs) guitarist, Yasuo Takai. The album has more beats than Takako's usual material. "Metromusica" is a miasma of bleeps and metronome clicks, along with Takako's childlike voice. It blends into the soothing "Slow Flow Mole." "Klaxon! (A New Type)" is a Takako Minekawa/Buffalo Daughter collaboration, that later appeared on Recubed.

== Track listing ==
1. "Metromusica" - 8:33
2. "Slow Flow Mole" - 7:00
3. "Klaxon! (A New Type)" - 4:12
4. "Fabie (1,2,3 Exercise)" - 5:25
5. "Fabie (1,2,3 Beat it)" - 3:31
