= The Olivia Tremor Control / Black Swan Network =

The Olivia Tremor Control/The Black Swan Network

Studio album by The Olivia Tremor Control/The Black Swan Network
- Released: 1997
- Genre: indie rock, ambient music
- Length: 40:56
- Label: Flydaddy Records

The Olivia Tremor Control chronology
Jumping Fences (1997)	The Olivia Tremor Control/The Black Swan Network (1997)	Hideway (1998)

The Olivia Tremor Control/The Black Swan Network is an LP released by the Olivia Tremor Control. Within some of these tracks are extracts from the Black Swan Network's dream appeal — taped audio contributions from fans of dreams they've had or would like to have. Often referred to as the Tour EP, the album was titled Olivia Tremor Control Vs. Black Swan Network when issued as a CD by Flydaddy, a choice made without the band's input. Band members have called it "Color Squares".

== Track listing ==
1. Introduction, Theme From Airplane Avenue, Flags of Symphony Swan Response, Morning Drones, Neuron Trains Backfire, Tape Splice Prelude, 1, 2, 3, 4 — 18:20
2. (Tape Composition), Evening Drones, Dusk at Cubist Castle Closing Theme — 22:36
