= Green Imagination =

Studio album by the Sunshine Fix
- Released: 2004
- Genre: Indie rock
- Label: spinART

The Sunshine Fix chronology
Age of the Sun (2002)	Green Imagination (2004)

Professional ratings
Aggregate scores
Source	Rating
Metacritic	(65/100)
Review scores
Source	Rating
AllMusic	4/5 stars
Pitchfork Media	(3.5/10)
PopMatters	(good, not great)

Green Imagination is a 2004 studio album by the Sunshine Fix. In style, often compared with mid-period Beatles and their contemporaries.

== Track listing ==
All songs written by Bill Doss

1. "Statues and Glue" – 1:56
2. "What Do You Know" – 3:44
3. "Extraordinary/Ordinary" – 2:27
4. "Papers Fall" – 4:25
5. "Innerstates" – 2:45
6. "Rx" – 5:41
7. "Afterglow" – 2:48
8. "Enjoy the Teeth" – 5:09
9. "Face the Ghost" – 2:39
10. "Runaway Run" – 4:44
11. "Sunday Afternoon" – 4:45

The music video for "Enjoy the Teeth" is included as an extra on the CD.
