= California Demise =

EP by the Olivia Tremor Control
- Released: 1994
- Recorded: 1992–93
- Genre: Indie rock
- Length: 12:49
- Label: Elephant 6 (E6 002)

The Olivia Tremor Control chronology
California Demise (1994)	The Olivia Tremor Control/The Apples in Stereo (1994)

California Demise is an EP by the Olivia Tremor Control. It was recorded at 210 Sunset Ave on various four tracks by the Olivia Tremor Control, then consisting of Bill Doss, Jeff Mangum and Will Cullen Hart. This was the second Elephant Six 7-inch EP (e6002). In 2000 the tracks were collected and placed on the Singles and Beyond compilation.

== Track listing ==
1. "Love Athena" – 2:39
2. "Today I Lost A Tooth" – 1:20
3. "California Demise pt. 1" – 1:21
4. "California Demise pt. 2" – 1:13
5. "A Sunshine Fix" – 2:48
6. "Fireplace" – 3:28

== Personnel ==
- Bill Doss, Jeff Mangum, W. Cullen Hart – acoustic and electric guitars, bass guitar, piano, Casio, drumset, singing
- Todd Welch and Pat Mevckey – Trumpets on "Sunshine Fix"
- Lucy Calhoun – Vocals on "Sunshine Fix"
