= Susan (Japanese singer) =

- Origin: Japan
- Genres: Electronic; pop; new wave; synthpop
- Instrument: Vocals
- Website: susanweb.jp/

Susan was a pop singer who recorded in Japan in the early 1980s. She is half-French and half-Japanese. Her music is technopop in style, mainly featuring synthesisers and drum machines.

== Biography ==
Susan had records released by CBS in the UK, though no single ever reached the top 40. In Japan, Epic Sony released her music. She was known to collaborate with various members of Yellow Magic Orchestra and other Japanese producers of the time such as Kazuhiko Katoh, Yukihiro Takahashi, Hajime Tachibana and Keiichi Suzuki. Though all her releases refer to her as Susan (or Suzan if directly taken from the Japanese katakana transliteration of her name, スーザン), the CDDB refers to her as being "Susan. E" when the "Complete Susan CD" is played in Winamp or RealPlayer. Aside from singing, she has also done some work as a model for clothing company Miho Matsuda and cosmetics company Shiseido Co. Ltd.

Since 2005, Susan has been playing live dates in Tokyo featuring re-arranged versions of her releases and has been writing new material.

== Discography ==
The list of her releases is as follows:

=== Albums ===
- Do You Believe In Magic?(1980:LP, CD ^{JPN})
- The Girl Can't Help It(1981:LP ^{JPN})
- Complete Susan (2005:CD ^{JPN})
- Parky Jean with Ryuichi Sakamoto on his compilation Works I CM (recorded 1982) (2003:CD ^{JPN})

=== Singles ===
- Onna No Jikan/Midori No Ballad (1971:7", ^{JPN}) - credited as Susan Nozaki
- 24000 Kai No Kiss/Dream Of You(1980:7" and promotional 12", ^{JPN})
- 24000 Kai No Kiss/Dream Of You(1980:7", ^{IT})
- Multi-Modern World/It's No Time For You Cry(1980:7", ^{JPN})
- Dream Of You/Freezing Fish Under The Moonlight(1981:7", ^{UK})
- Do You Believe In Magic?/Ah! Soka(1981:7", ^{FR})
- Koi Seyo Otome/Training(1981:7", ^{JPN})
- Samarukando Ohdori/My Love(1981:7", ^{JPN})
- I Only Come Out At Night/Blow Up(1982:7", ^{UK})
- Syabong Doll/Koi Wa Dance(1984:7", ^{JPN} - Produced by T.Kashibuchi)

== See also ==
- Japanese pop music
