= A Spiraling World of Pop =

Studio album by the Sunshine Fix
- Released: 1993
- Genre: Experimental
- Length: 31:33
- Label: Elephant 6

The Sunshine Fix chronology
| A Spiraling World of Pop (1993) | Sunshine Fix EP (1999) |

Back cover

A Spiraling World of Pop is the first recording by the Sunshine Fix. It was released by The Elephant 6 Recording Company as a cassette in 1993.

== Track listing ==
1. Listen for the Day – 3:17
2. Love Athena – 4:00
3. I'll Be Gone – 3:07
4. You Won't Be – 2:10
5. Queen Misery – 2:37
6. Learn – 2:55
7. Temptation – 3:06
8. Turtle Song – 3:26
9. Superman Suit – 3:59
10. Leonard Upon Entering the Fish Market (speaks of apple butter) – 2:56
