= Singles and Beyond =

Compilation album by the Olivia Tremor Control
- Released: August 8, 2000
- Recorded: 1992–1996
- Genre: Indie rock
- Length: 50:59
- Label: Emperor Norton

The Olivia Tremor Control chronology
Black Foliage: Animation Music Volume One (1999)	Singles and Beyond (2000)	The Same Place (2026)

Professional ratings
Review scores
Source	Rating
AllMusic	3/5 stars
Pitchfork	7.8/10
The Rolling Stone Album Guide	2.5/5 stars

Singles and Beyond is a compilation album by American indie rock band the Olivia Tremor Control, consisting of several rare or out-of-print tracks by the band.

== Track listing ==
All songs written by the Olivia Tremor Control.

1. "Love Athena" – 2:39
2. "Today I Lost a Tooth" – 1:20
3. "California Demise Pt. 1" – 1:21
4. "California Demise Pt. 2" – 1:13
5. "A Sunshine Fix" – 2:48
6. "Fireplace" – 3:28
7. "Collage #1" – 3:51
8. "Beneath the Climb" – 2:40
9. "I Won This Dog at the Driftwood Reunion Carnival" – 1:18
10. "Christmas with William S." – 2:54
11. "The Giant Day" – 1:50
12. "Shaving Spiders" – 2:24
13. "The Princess Turns the Key to Cubist Castle (Curtain Call Pt. 1&2)" – 2:24
14. "Curtain Call Pt. 3" – 1:10
15. "I'm Not Feeling Human" – 1:52
16. "The Giant Day (Dusk)" – 3:33
17. "Late Music 2" – 3:42
18. "Gypsum Oil Field Fire" – 3:40
19. "King of the Claws" – 2:10
20. "The Ships" – 4:32

Notes

- Tracks 1–6 from California Demise EP.
- Track 7 from Ptolemaic Terrascope's Terrastock Festival compilation.
- Track 8 from a Cassiel Records compilation that the band notes to this day they've never seen. Note from former Cassiel proprietor: Cassiel shipped 10 copies per agreement to Will and Bill, who let the rental on their PO box lapse without leaving a forwarding address.
- Track 9 from Soundtrack to the Bible Belt.
- Track 10 from Christmas in Stereo.
- Tracks 11–16 from The Giant Day EP.
- Track 17 from Treble Revolution, Vol. 2.
- Tracks 18–19 from 7" split single with The Apples in Stereo.
- Track 20 from Ptolemaic Terrascope's Succour compilation.
