= Explanation II: Instrumental Themes and Dream Sequences =

Studio album by the Olivia Tremor Control
- Released: 1998
- Recorded: 1993–1996
- Genre: Ambient
- Length: 68:34
- Label: Flydaddy

The Olivia Tremor Control chronology
Music from the Unrealized Film Script: Dusk at Cubist Castle (1996)	Explanation II: Instrumental Themes and Dream Sequences (1998)	Black Foliage: Animation Music Volume One (1999)

Professional ratings
Review scores
Source	Rating
AllMusic	4/5 stars

Explanation II: Instrumental Themes and Dream Sequences is an album by American indie rock band the Olivia Tremor Control, initially released as a bonus CD with the first few thousand copies of their 1996 debut album Music from the Unrealized Film Script: Dusk at Cubist Castle. It consists of nine tracks of ambient sounds, recorded by The Olivia Tremor Control, and it has been claimed that the album will produce quadraphonic sound when played in synchronicity with Dusk at Cubist Castle. Explanation II was later re-released on its own by Flydaddy Records in 1998.

== Track listing ==
All tracks are written by the Olivia Tremor Control.

No.	Title	Length
1.	"Cycle 1"	8:08
2.	"Cycle 2"	4:59
3.	"Cycle 3"	7:41
4.	"Cycle 4"	7:00
5.	"Cycle 5"	11:37
6.	"Cycle 6"	3:13
7.	"Cycle 7"	10:55
8.	"Cycle 8"	9:07
9.	"Cycle 9"	5:45
Total length:		68:34
