= Black Foliage: Animation Music Volume One =

Studio album by the Olivia Tremor Control
- Released: March 23, 1999
- Recorded: 1995–1998
- Genres: Neo-psychedelia; psychedelic pop; sound collage
- Length: 69:02
- Labels: Flydaddy, Cloud
- Producer: Robert Schneider

The Olivia Tremor Control chronology
Explanation II: Instrumental Themes and Dream Sequences (1998)	Black Foliage: Animation Music Volume One (1999)	Singles and Beyond (2000)

Black Foliage: Animation Music Volume One (sometimes shortened to Black Foliage) is the second studio album by American neo-psychedelic band the Olivia Tremor Control, released on March 23, 1999 through Flydaddy Records. It was re-released on vinyl in November 2011 through Chunklet.

The album consists primarily of psychedelic pop and rock music that is deeply layered with various field recordings and found sounds with analog tape manipulation, as well as several sound collage tracks ranging in length from four seconds to over eleven minutes. There are five "Animation" songs, which all feature the same melodic motif explored in several different ways with heavy sonic experimentation. The album is largely inspired by 1960s pop artists such as the Beatles and the Beach Boys, particularly their later, more psychedelic work like Sgt. Pepper's Lonely Hearts Club Band and Pet Sounds, as well as the then-unreleased Smile.

== Background ==
In the liner notes of their debut album Music from the Unrealized Film Script: Dusk at Cubist Castle, the Olivia Tremor Control requested their fans to send in tape recordings of them describing dreams they had, which are sampled on Black Foliage, most notably on the second "Combinations" track and "Hilltop Procession (Momentum Gaining)". This request is also repeated in the liner notes for Black Foliage. According to band member Will Cullen Hart, the Animation tracks are intended to evoke imagery of animations.

== Recording ==
According to the liner notes, Black Foliage was recorded on various 4 and 8 track tape machines between 1995 and 1998, with overdubs being recorded as the album was being mixed over the course of 5 weeks in the summer of 1998 with producer Robert Schneider. The liner notes also detail that the band collaborated with many fellow members of The Elephant 6 Recording Company collective in the making of the album, including Neutral Milk Hotel frontman Jeff Mangum and of Montreal frontperson Kevin Barnes, who both sing backup vocals on the song "I Have Been Floated".

The album also makes use of several eclectic and unusual instruments, with Elf Power keyboardist Laura Carter, a guest musician on the album, later reminiscing on the group using a "guitar organ".

Doss noted that some of the songs from Dusk at Cubist Castle had been recorded when the band was just him and Hart, and that they had not at the time thought about recording a full album. As a result, he described the album as "patchwork", and wanted Black Foliage to sound more cohesive.

== Composition ==
A core aspect of Black Foliage is its usage of elements of both musique concrète and sound collage, often heavily layered into the album's conventional songs and featured as separate compositions. Hart referred to these parts of the album as "animation music", and remarked, "almost during every song, you hear some little thing creak or groan or zip by [...] sort-of a sound and space, personified -- just flying around to greet you in a friendly way". Jason Ankeny of AllMusic compared Black Foliage to the Beach Boys' unfinished album Smile, owing to its mix of pop-friendly melodies and experimental compositions. Ankeny described Black Foliage as, "a work teetering on the cliff's edge between genius and madness [...] between pop transcendence and noise radicalism".

== Critical reception ==
Professional ratings
Aggregate scores
Source	Rating
Metacritic	75/100
Review scores
Source	Rating
AllMusic	4/5 stars
The A.V. Club	A
Entertainment Weekly	B+
The Guardian	4/5 stars
Melody Maker	4/5 stars
NME	6/10
Pitchfork	9.4/10
Rolling Stone	3/5 stars
Spin	7/10
The Village Voice	B−

On the review aggregate site Metacritic, Black Foliage earned a rating of 75 out of 100, indicating "generally positive reviews". Writing for Pitchfork, Paul Thompson described it as "among the most satisfying psychedelic albums of any decade", going on to compare it to the Buddhist concept of Bardo. Matt LeMay, a writer for The A.V. Club, favorably described the Chunklet re-issues as "bringing [Black Foliage's] remarkable complexity into greater focus".

== Track listing ==
All tracks are written by the Olivia Tremor Control.

Side One
No.	Title	Length
1.	"Opening"	0:25
2.	"A Peculiar Noise Called 'Train Director'"	3:02
3.	"Combinations"	0:04
4.	"Hideaway"	2:34
5.	"Black Foliage (Animation 1)"	1:11
6.	"Combinations"	0:14
7.	"The Sky Is a Harpsichord Canvas"	0:04
8.	"A Sleepy Company"	3:40
9.	"Grass Canons"	3:21
Total length:		14:39

Side Two
No.	Title	Length
10.	"A New Day"	2:29
11.	"Combinations"	0:15
12.	"Black Foliage (Animation 2)"	1:23
13.	"I Have Been Floated"	3:39
14.	"Paranormal Echoes"	3:30
15.	"Black Foliage (Animation 3)"	0:44
16.	"A Place We Have Been To"	2:25
Total length:		14:29

Side Three
No.	Title	Length
17.	"Black Foliage (Itself)"	2:54
18.	"The Sylvan Screen"	6:07
19.	"The Bark and Below It"	11:24
20.	"Black Foliage (Animation 4)"	1:36
Total length:		22:04

Side Four
No.	Title	Length
21.	"California Demise 3"	2:46
22.	"Looking for Quiet Seeds"	3:13
23.	"Combinations"	0:11
24.	"Mystery"	3:25
25.	"Another Set of Bees in the Museum"	3:07
26.	"Black Foliage (Animation 5)"	2:08
27.	"Hilltop Procession (Momentum Gaining)"	3:21
Total length:		18:15

== Personnel ==
Credits are adapted from the album's liner notes.

The Olivia Tremor Control

- Bill Doss – performer, layout
- Peter Erchick – performer
- John Fernandes – performer
- Eric Harris – performer
- Will Cullen Hart – performer, paintings, layout

Additional musicians

- Julian Koster – saw (13), Magnus organ (16), accordion (17, 18, 21), banjo (18), vocals (21, 27)
- Jeff Mangum – melodica (8), percussion (9), vocals (13, 27)
- Eric Ledford – cello (8)
- Robert Schneider – vocals (8), guitar (10)
- Scott Spillane – trumpet, euphonium, bugle (4, 10, 18, 21, 24)
- Kirk Pleasant – trombone (2, 4, 10, 13, 21)
- John d'Azzo – acoustic guitar (4), vocals (21, 27)
- Robbee Cucchiaro – vocals (27)
- Bryan Helium – acoustic guitar (4), vocals (13)
- Kevin Barnes – acoustic guitar (4), vocals (13, 21, 27)
- Josh McKay – vibraphone (9)
- Kai Reidel – xylophone, "Selemintan" (9)
- Jeremy Barnes – percussion (9)
- Laura Carter – vocals (13, 27), percussion (27)
- Andrew Rieger – vocals (13)
- Erin Rodriguez – vocals (13)
- Christopher Hart – "diving" (19)
- Jennifer Oliff – vocals (27)
- "Dream Tapes":
  - Maggie Wright
  - Emily Grace McMullen
  - Hideki Ito
  - Ralf E. Friel
  - Jack Chang
  - Josh Bearman
  - Troy Elyea

Production

- The Olivia Tremor Control – producer, writer
- Alan Douches – mastering engineer
- Robert Schneider – mixing
- Isaac McCalla – sequencing
