= Music from the Unrealized Film Script: Dusk at Cubist Castle =

Studio album by the Olivia Tremor Control
- Released: August 6, 1996
- Studios: Pet Sounds, Denver
- Genres: Indie pop; neo-psychedelia; psychedelic pop
- Length: 74:05
- Label: Flydaddy
- Producer: Robert Schneider

The Olivia Tremor Control chronology
Music from the Unrealized Film Script: Dusk at Cubist Castle (1996)	Black Foliage: Animation Music Volume One (1999)

Music from the Unrealized Film Script: Dusk at Cubist Castle (sometimes shortened to Dusk at Cubist Castle) is the debut studio album by American neo-psychedelic band the Olivia Tremor Control, released on August 6, 1996, by Flydaddy Records. It is a stylistically diverse album that encompasses a variety of genres, often bridging conventional indie pop and psychedelic pop with avant-garde influences from styles such as sound collage. The band were influenced by pop artists of the 1960s and 1970s, such as the Beach Boys and the Beatles, as well as experimental musicians like John Cage. Dusk at Cubist Castle purports to be the soundtrack to an unfinished film, and the lyrics focus on surrealist imagery.

Dusk at Cubist Castle was recorded at Pet Sounds Studio in Denver, Colorado, with childhood friend of the band Robert Schneider serving as producer; the recording sessions featured several other musicians from the Elephant 6 circle, including Jeff Mangum and Julian Koster. Dusk at Cubist Castle received positive reviews from critics, many of whom commended the band's ability to mix eclectic psychedelic genres with pop-friendly melodies. In 2003, Pitchfork ranked it #39 as one of the 100 best albums of the 1990s.

== Background and recording ==
The Olivia Tremor Control originated as a psychedelic band called Cranberry Lifecycle. This band was formed in Ruston, Louisiana in the late 1980s, by high school friends Will Cullen Hart and Jeff Mangum. After graduating from high school, the two moved to Athens, Georgia, and changed the name of the band from Cranberry Lifecycle to Synthetic Flying Machine. Fellow Rustonian Bill Doss joined in 1993, after which the lineup consisted of Hart on electric guitar, Doss on bass guitar, and Mangum on drums. The band gained a small following due in part to their psychedelia-infused music, which differed from the prevalent dark and angsty sound of popular bands at the time such as the Jesus Lizard and Nirvana. Mangum left the group shortly after its formation, as he wanted to focus on a solo project which would eventually become Neutral Milk Hotel. Doss and Hart, per Mangum's suggestion while he was still part of the band, decided to rename the group to the Olivia Tremor Control, which was intended to be a surreal sounding phrase with no further meaning. (Note: Doss offered a different explanation of the band name in 1998, stating: "It refers to two friends, Jacqueline and Olivia, who were separated during the California earthquake of 1906 and have been searching for each other ever since, across different dimensions of time and space.")

Following the 1994 release of the first Olivia Tremor Control extended play, California Demise, Hart moved to Denver, while Doss moved to New York City to play in the band Chocolate USA. By 1996, Doss was losing interest in Chocolate USA, and wished to record more music with Hart. The two reconvened in Athens, and recruited multi-instrumentalists John Fernandes and Eric Harris to fill out the band. With this lineup, the Olivia Tremor Control traveled to Denver to record their first studio album. Robert Schneider, a childhood friend of Doss and Hart, served as the producer, and the album was recorded at Pet Sounds Studio.

Hart had been recording songs on 4-track tapes for a studio album for several years, while Doss' contributions were mostly written once he had arrived at Pet Sounds Studio. An author for Stereogum described Doss' ideas as more pop-friendly while Hart wrote more experimental songs, although Hart later disagreed with this notion, and argued that Doss was just as interested in experimental music. The Stereogum author further compared the two to Lennon–McCartney of the Beatles, but noted that both Fernandes and Harris still retained direct creative input nonetheless. Schneider played on several songs, and other musicians like Mangum and Julian Koster also contributed. In the liner notes for Dusk at Cubist Castle, one of the instruments Mangum was credited with playing was "space bubbles", although no explanation was given as to what the term meant. Hart noted that the recording sessions were busy, and estimated that at least eight different people played guitar on the song "The Opera House". Hart also remarked on the frenetic pace at which the album was recorded: "[Harris] wrote 'Frosted Ambassador' in like five minutes, while [Doss] was mixing 'Jumping Fences' or something. With everyone around, there was this excitement."

== Composition ==
"Holiday Surprise 1, 2, 3"
A 20 second audio sample of the song "Holiday Surprise 1, 2, 3". Zachary Houle of PopMatters described it as "a country meets folk rock number that bridges the gap between 1965 and 1968-era Byrds".

"Green Typewriters"
A 20 second audio sample of the eighth part of the "Green Typewriters" suite. It is a drone piece that features the sound of standing bells, typewriter keys, passing cars, and dripping water.

Dusk at Cubist Castle is a 74-minute double album comprising 27 songs. Critics have described Dusk at Cubist Castle as an eclectic album that encompasses a variety of genres, including indie pop, neo-psychedelia, and psychedelic pop. Jason Ankeny of AllMusic also notes the influence of other genres, such as krautrock, noise music, and folk rock. While discussing the music as a whole, Stereogum described Dusk at Cubist Castle as a "maximalist analog production, sonically distended with so many different ideas that it sounds a little different every time you hear it." The album purports to be the soundtrack to an unfinished film titled Dusk at Cubist Castle; however, no such film has ever surfaced.

Some critics have found the first half of Dusk at Cubist Castle to be more immediate and easily accessible than the rest of the album. Zachary Houle of PopMatters describes these songs as "Beach Boys meets late-period Beatles in its take on psychedelica [sic]". "Jumping Fences" and "Define a Transparent Dream" are among the album's songs most notably indebted to 1960s and '70s bands. Houle compares "Jumping Fences" to works of John Lennon and Badfinger, while "Define a Transparent Dream" is described as reminiscent of David Bowie's "Changes." Paul Thompson of Pitchfork notes that while the Olivia Tremor Control are greatly influenced by these bands, they intersperse their songs with what he describes as "weird left turns, with hooks that seem to bubble out of nowhere before receding into themselves."

The second half of the album features more experimental songs, influenced by drone music and musique concrète. When asked about the inclusion of these experimental songs, Fernandes said: "We wanted to change the way people listen to music [...] Make people who love the Beatles also appreciate John Cage." An example of this experimentation is the "Green Typewriters" suite of ten consecutive songs bearing the same name. The eighth song in the suite is nearly ten minutes, and is a drone piece that features the sound of standing bells, typewriter keys, passing cars, and dripping water. The album's title track is a similar piece, which Houle compared to the music of a haunted house. Houle notes that not every song on the second half of the album is as experimental as these, however, and highlights the final song "NYC-25" as a "jaunty country rock number that leaves an aftertaste of the Beatles yet again."

Thematically, Dusk at Cubist Castle focuses on surrealist imagery, in particular, dreams. Hart described the album as "dream music for your mind." Thompson identifies the opening song "The Opera House" as an example of lyrical surrealism, as it mentions going to the movie theater to simply watch the actors move their mouths. Other topics found throughout the album include a dream that features model headshots of Gertrude Stein ("Define a Transparent Dream"), and a psychonaut who is too transfixed by the thoughts in his mind to speak ("Jumping Fences"). Many of the lyrics found throughout Dusk at Cubist Castle are sincere and happy, which Stereogum noted was different from the prevailing ethos of 1990s indie music, which often thematically focused on feelings of disillusionment and a sense of irony. In a 1997 interview, Doss said that he wanted the Olivia Tremor Control's music to instill a sense of "mystery or happiness" in listeners. "I'm sending out a positive message, because the world needs it [...] We're reaching for something that's hard to explain."

== Release and reception ==
Professional ratings
Review scores
Source	Rating
AllMusic	4.5/5 stars
Alternative Press	4/5
The Austin Chronicle	4/5 stars
The A.V. Club	A
NME	8/10
Pitchfork	9.1/10
Q	3/5 stars
The Rolling Stone Album Guide	3/5 stars
Spin	7/10
Tiny Mix Tapes	4.5/5

Dusk at Cubist Castle was released on August 6, 1996, by Flydaddy Records. The songs "The Opera House" and "Jumping Fences" were released as singles. Early CD pressings included a bonus disc which featured a companion album, Explanation II: Instrumental Themes and Dream Sequences. Explanation II contains nine ambient songs, and in the liner notes it is suggested to play the two albums in synchronicity, as this would purportedly create quadraphonic sound. (Note: Playing Dusk at Cubist Castle and Explanation II in synchronicity does not produce quadraphonic sound, as the two albums are of different lengths.) To promote the album, the Olivia Tremor Control served as an opener for Beck, and toured with Gorky's Zygotic Mynci in 1998. Keyboardist Peter Erchick was brought on as the official fifth band member while on tour.

In a contemporary review of Dusk at Cubist Castle for NME, Tom Cox called the Olivia Tremor Control "experts at combining the absurd with the uplifting." Alternative Press praised the band's "perfect hooks and strong, melodic singing", while Jason Cohen of The Austin Chronicle remarked that, with the exception of the "random bursts and transient noise" of "Green Typewriters", Dusk at Cubist Castle is "an embarrassment of pop riches, a mildly psychedelic, lavishly melodic quasi-masterpiece." Spin reviewer Chuck Stephens gave qualified praise, crediting the group for avoiding "parodic excess or overproduced pabulum" but much preferring the album's "silly pop songs", opining that "when OTC stop shaking ... the mind candy starts to melt." Q's Johnny Black found the album largely derivative of 1960s acts such as the Beach Boys and the Beatles, though overall successful at reinterpreting their sounds "through a '90s filter". The album ranked at number 37 in The Village Voice's year-end Pazz & Jop critics' poll.

Writing in retrospect for Pitchfork, Paul Thompson lauded Dusk at Cubist Custle as a "stately, sumptuous, and slightly otherworldly" album "brimming with immaculate hooks and queries bound for the cosmos". In 2003, it was ranked at number 39 on the website's list of the best albums of the 1990s. In the 2004 Rolling Stone Album Guide, Roni Sarig stated that despite "a serious need for editing", the album stands as the Olivia Tremor Control's "most cohesive recording, revealing a band clearly capable of creating solid retro-pop songs." Jason Ankeny, in his review for AllMusic, likened it to the Beatles' 1968 self-titled album in sound and "unfettered creativity", dubbing it "an incredible facsimile". Tiny Mix Tapes said that while Dusk at Cubist Candle draws "unabashedly ... from obvious sources", its primary strength "lies not in inventiveness or experimentation (which is not to say it lacks any), but in its ability to strike a dear balance between the temptation of emulating the artists so highly revered, and the exigency and essential need to forge a new sound."

== Track listing ==
All tracks are written by the Olivia Tremor Control.

No.	Title	Length
1.	"The Opera House"	3:12
2.	"Frosted Ambassador"	1:02
3.	"Jumping Fences"	1:52
4.	"Define a Transparent Dream"	2:49
5.	"No Growing (Exegesis)"	3:00
6.	"Holiday Surprise 1, 2, 3"	6:11
7.	"Courtyard"	2:57
8.	"Memories of Jacqueline 1906"	2:15
9.	"Tropical Bells"	1:40
10.	"Can You Come Down with Us?"	2:18
11.	"Marking Time"	4:27
12.	"Green Typewriters"	2:22
13.	"Green Typewriters"	0:24
14.	"Green Typewriters"	0:59
15.	"Green Typewriters"	2:11
16.	"Green Typewriters"	1:10
17.	"Green Typewriters"	0:38
18.	"Green Typewriters"	1:38
19.	"Green Typewriters"	9:39
20.	"Green Typewriters"	1:21
21.	"Green Typewriters"	2:39
22.	"Spring Succeeds"	2:25
23.	"Theme for a Very Delicious Grand Piano"	0:57
24.	"I Can Smell the Leaves"	1:50
25.	"Dusk at Cubist Castle"	7:35
26.	"The Gravity Car"	1:45
27.	"NYC-25"	4:37
Total length:		74:05

== Personnel ==
Credits are adapted from the album's liner notes.

The Olivia Tremor Control

- Bill Doss – all instrumentation, vocals, all artwork and design
- Will Cullen Hart – all instrumentation, vocals, all artwork and design
- Eric Harris – all instrumentation, vocals
- John Fernandes – all instrumentation, vocals

Additional musicians

- The Elephant 6 Orchestra:
  - Robert Schneider – Tibetan prayer bowl, bass, vocals, melodica, co-production, engineering
  - Jeff Mangum – chanter pipe, slide guitar, vocals, melodica, piano, "space bubbles"
  - Julian Koster – bowed electric guitar, mallet struck acoustic guitar, the singing saw
  - Steve Jacobek – trumpet
  - Rick Benjamin – trombone
