= Foggy Notions =

Former Irish music magazine

Foggy Notions was an independently published Irish music magazine founded by Leagues O' Toole and Myles Claffey, designed and art directed by Gareth Jones, which focused on the more esoteric elements of electronica, indie, and folk music.

== History and profile ==
Foggy Notions was established in 2004. Artists such as Mark E Smith, Skream, The Flaming Lips, and Joanna Newsom were interviewed by the magazine, and featured on the cover. The magazine was based in Dublin. It ceased publication in 2007.
