= The Olivia Tremor Control =

American rock band

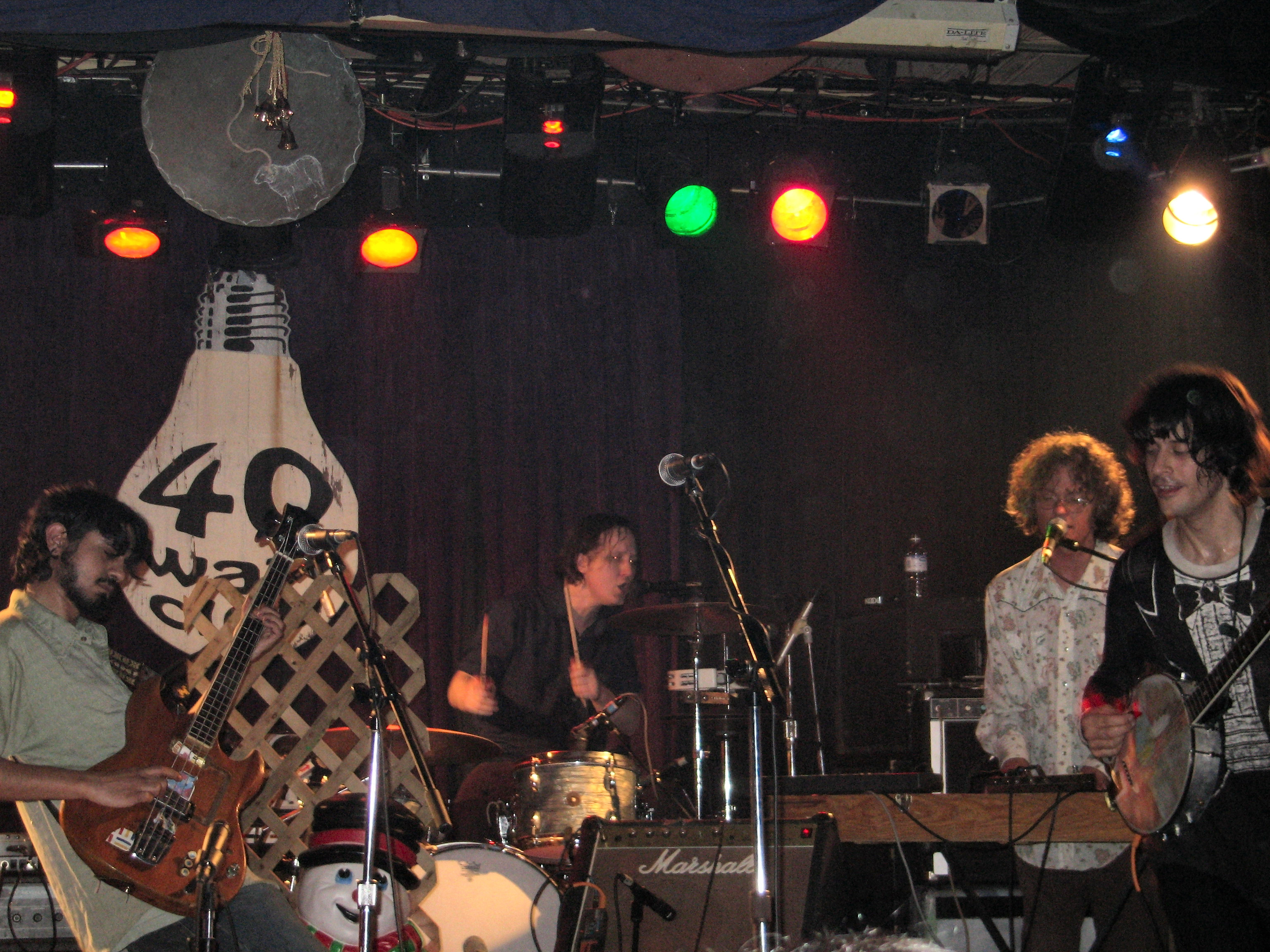
- The Olivia Tremor Control performing in 2005

Background information
- Origin: Athens, Georgia, U.S.
- Genres: Neo-psychedelia; indie rock; psychedelic pop; psychedelic rock; experimental pop; experimental rock
- Years active: 1994–2000; 2005; 2009–2026
- Labels: Flydaddy; Cloud
- Spinoffs: Neutral Milk Hotel; Circulatory System
- Spinoff of: Synthetic Flying Machine
- Past members: Will Cullen Hart; Bill Doss; Jeff Mangum; Eric Harris; John Fernandes; Peter Erchick; Derek Almstead; AJ Griffin
- Website: oliviatremorcontrol.com

The Olivia Tremor Control was an American neo-psychedelic band from Athens, Georgia. They released three studio albums, four EPs, a bonus disc, a singles collection, a non-album single and a live session between 1996 and 2026. The main members were Will Cullen Hart, Bill Doss, Eric Harris, John Fernandes and Peter Erchick. They derived their main influences from psychedelic pop bands of the 1960s, especially the Beatles' 1966-67 albums and the Beach Boys' SMiLE.

The Olivia Tremor Control originated as a band called Cranberry Lifecycle, which was formed in Ruston, Louisiana in the late 1980s by Hart and his high school friend Jeff Mangum. The two moved to Athens, and reworked Cranberry Lifecycle songs as a new band called Synthetic Flying Machine. After Doss joined, Mangum left the band to pursue a solo project that eventually became Neutral Milk Hotel. Doss and Hart then renamed the band the Olivia Tremor Control, and recruited Fernandes, Harris, and Erchick. With this line-up, the Olivia Tremor Control released two albums: Dusk at Cubist Castle (1996) and Black Foliage (1999). Both albums received positive reviews from critics.

After the release of Black Foliage, tensions grew between Hart and Doss, and the Olivia Tremor Control broke up in 2000. The band reunited in April 2005 after being invited to play the All Tomorrows Parties festival in the UK. Partway through recording sessions for a third album, Doss died of an aneurysm in 2012. Hart died in 2024 after the release of two then-recently released songs from the band. The band's third and final album, The Same Place, released in October 2026.

== History ==
=== Early years ===
The Olivia Tremor Control originated in the late 1980s as a psychedelic band called Cranberry Lifecycle, formed in Ruston, Louisiana. It was one of many home recording projects created by high school friends Will Cullen Hart and Jeff Mangum with their friends Bill Doss and Robert Schneider. The four friends exchanged homemade cassette tapes, branding them with an imaginary record label, Elephant 6, which eventually grew into a loose musical collective. Musician Ross Beach, another Elephant 6 collaborator, describes Cranberry Lifecycle as the Elephant 6's "first collaboration of 'serious' songs."

After graduating from high school, Hart and Mangum moved to Athens, Georgia to join the city's burgeoning music scene. They formed a band called Synthetic Flying Machine, and reworked songs that were originally recorded as Cranberry Lifecycle. In the summer of 1993, Doss moved to Athens and joined Synthetic Flying Machine. The lineup consisted of Hart on electric guitar, Doss on bass guitar, and Mangum on drums. (Note: Beach also identifies Hart's then-girlfriend as a member of the band, but did not specify her role.) The band gained a small following due in part to the psychedelic-infused music, which differed from the prevalent grunge sound in the city. Mangum left the group shortly after its formation to focus on a solo project, which eventually became Neutral Milk Hotel. Doss and Hart renamed their group the Olivia Tremor Control, a surreal-sounding phrase with no further meaning, which had been suggested by Mangum. (Note: Doss offered a different explanation of the band name in 1998, stating: "It refers to two friends, Jacqueline and Olivia, who were separated during the [...] earthquake of 1906 and have been searching for each other ever since, across different dimensions of time and space.")

The first Olivia Tremor Control release was the extended play (EP) California Demise in 1994, which introduced many of their signature elements, including guitar effects and vocal harmonies. Although Mangum was no longer a part of the band, he still lived with Doss and Hart and was asked to play drums. After California Demise, Hart moved to Denver, while Doss moved to New York to play in the band Chocolate USA. By 1996, Doss was losing interest in Chocolate USA, and wanted to record more music with Hart. The two reconvened in Athens, and recruited multi-instrumentalists John Fernandes and Eric Harris. During this period, the Olivia Tremor Control released the 1994 split single The Olivia Tremor Control/The Apples in Stereo with the Apples in Stereo, and the 1996 EP The Giant Day.

=== Music from the Unrealized Film Script: Dusk at Cubist Castle ===
Doss and Hart had been working on songs for a studio album as early as 1993. Doss' ideas were more pop friendly while Hart wrote more experimental songs. Their dichotomous partnership during this era drew some comparisons to Lennon–McCartney of the Beatles, although Stereogum noted that both Fernandes and Harris retained creative input. In 1995, the Olivia Tremor Control went to Denver, Colorado to record their debut album, Music from the Unrealized Film Script: Dusk at Cubist Castle (commonly shortened to Dusk at Cubist Castle). It was recorded at Pet Sounds Studio, and was produced by Schneider.

At 74 minutes in length with 27 songs, Dusk at Cubist Castle was a large undertaking. It was purported to be the soundtrack to a fictional film, and was described by music critics as covering a wide range of genres, including psychedelia, krautrock, noise music, and folk-rock. Dusk at Cubist Castle was released on August 6, 1996, by Flydaddy Records. The songs "The Opera House" and "Jumping Fences" were released as singles. To promote the album, the Olivia Tremor Control served as an opener for Beck, and toured with Gorky's Zygotic Mynci in 1998. Keyboardist Peter Erchick was brought on as the fifth band member while on tour. Dusk at Cubist Castle received positive reviews from critics, who noted the intricate composition and judicious use of pop elements. It ranked at number 37 on The Village Voice's year-end Pazz & Jop critics' poll.

Early CD pressings of Dusk at Cubist Castle included a companion album, Explanation II: Instrumental Themes and Dream Sequences, which had nine experimental ambient tracks. The liner notes for Explanation II suggested that it should be played in synchronicity with Dusk at Cubist Castle on speakers behind the listener to create quadraphonic sound; the albums are different lengths, so the effect does not actually work.

In 1997, the band appeared on John Peel's BBC Radio 1 show. Their entire appearance was recorded and released as an untitled four-track EP known as Those Sessions or John Peel Session 1997. It includes several renditions of existing songs as well as a lengthy improvised piece in a similar style to Explanation II.

=== Black Foliage: Animation Music Volume One ===
In the liner notes for Dusk at Cubist Castle, the Olivia Tremor Control asked fans to mail the band cassette tapes of themselves describing their dreams. These tapes served as the basis for band's second album Black Foliage: Animation Music Volume One (commonly shortened to Black Foliage). The Olivia Tremor Control wanted to explore the concept of dreams, and the way they emulate life with unexpected deviations, such as going to work naked. Black Foliage was recorded at Pet Sounds Studio, and Schneider once again served as the producer.

Hart was influenced by the electronic sound of the 1969 White Noise album An Electric Storm, which led him to splice traditional compositions the band members had been writing with experimental electronic pieces. These splices became an important musical motif for Black Foliage. The album is continuous, and does not feature musical pauses or fade, with many songs eschewing the standard verse–chorus form.

Black Foliage was released by Flydaddy Records on March 23, 1999, to positive reviews. Critics highlighted the juxtaposition of pop and experimental elements, as well as the richness of the sound. To promote the album, the Olivia Tremor Control toured with opener band Bablicon, and then served as an opener for Stereolab.

In 2000, the band wrote and recorded five songs with Japanese singer Kahimi Karie, released under her name as the EP Once Upon a Time.

=== Breakup, reunion, and the deaths of Doss and Hart, The Same Place ===
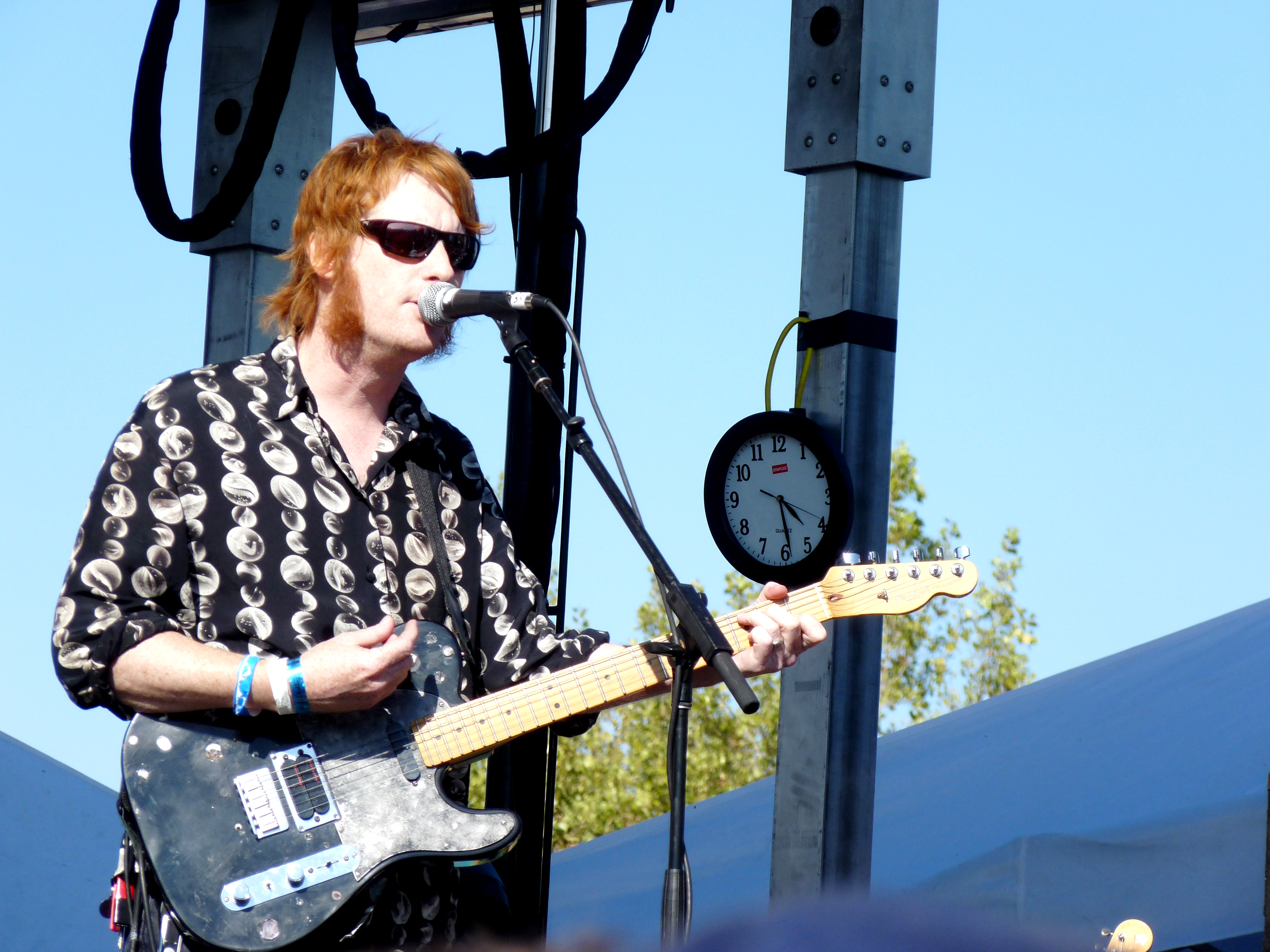

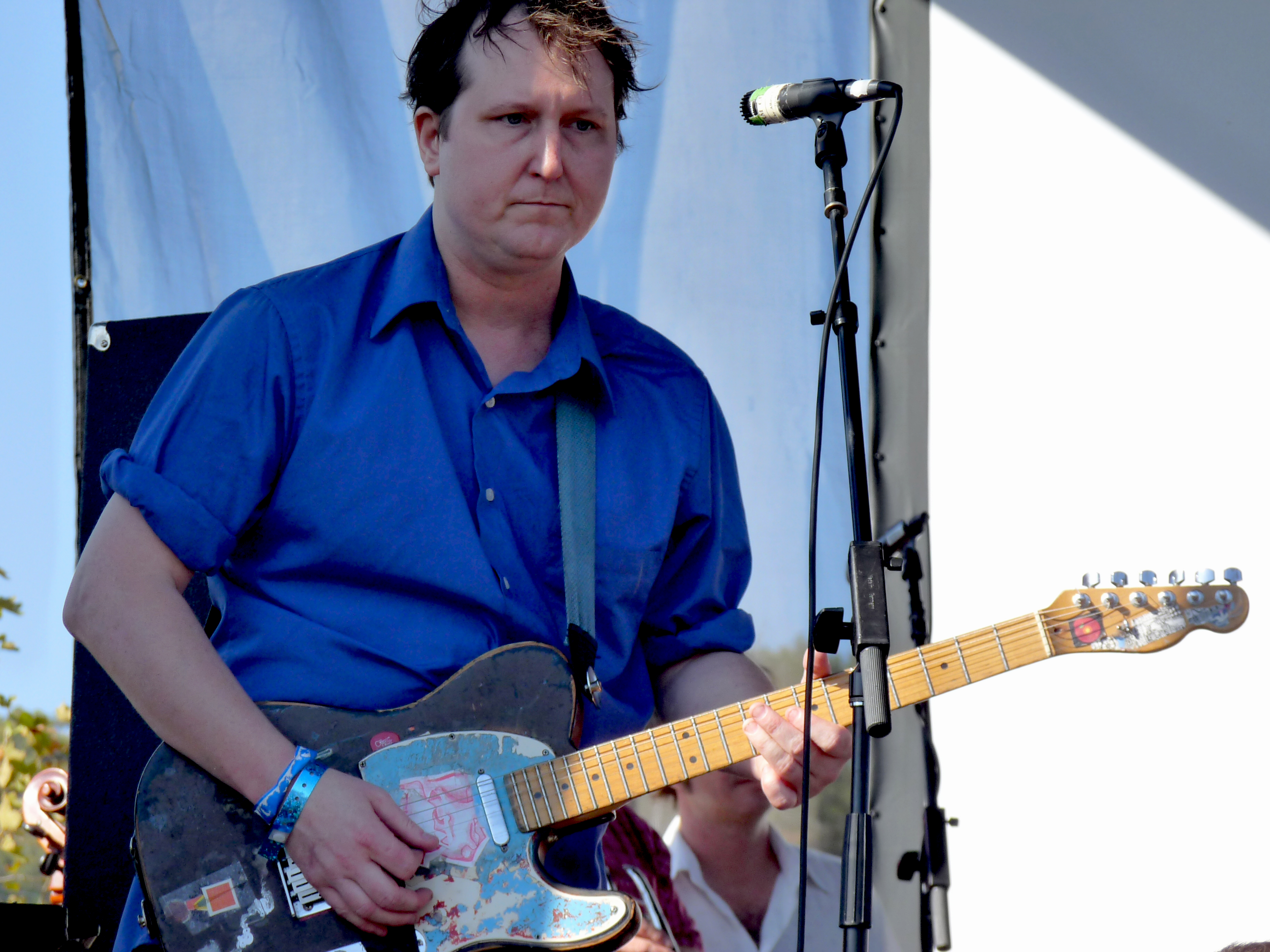
Bill Doss (top) and Will Cullen Hart (bottom) performing with the Olivia Tremor Control at FYF Fest 2010

After the release of Black Foliage, tensions grew between Doss and Hart. According to Doss, Hart wanted to take a hiatus from music, and was suffering from early symptoms of then-undiagnosed multiple sclerosis. The two had a falling out, and the Olivia Tremor Control broke up in 2000. The last album to be released during this period was Singles and Beyond, a compilation album featuring some of the band's rare and out of print songs. Doss and Hart worked on other projects in the interim; Doss recorded music for his solo project the Sunshine Fix and was a member of the Apples in Stereo, while Hart formed the band Circulatory System.

After a brief reunion performance at the 2005 All Tomorrow's Parties festival, the Olivia Tremor Control scheduled more concerts over the next few years. Fernandes said: "When we got the offer to play [All Tomorrow's Parties] we were thinking about playing a few shows here and there, because everybody still lives here in town ... That went so well that we decided to do a few more." In January 2007, Hart was briefly hospitalized and was diagnosed with multiple sclerosis. The Olivia Tremor Control officially reunited in 2009, and released two new songs over the next two years: "North Term Reality" and "The Game You Play Is in Your Head, Parts 1, 2, & 3."

On July 31, 2012, the band announced that Doss had died aged 43. Atlanta later reported the cause of death as an aneurysm. Prior to his death, the Olivia Tremor Control was recording music for a then-untitled album. The remaining members decided to continue performing as the Olivia Tremor Control, and another album was still in production. Hart stated it would be the band's final album and said: "We have three sides worth of songs done, though they're not sequenced properly yet to run three sides."

On November 29, 2024, the Olivia Tremor Control released the singles "Garden of Light" and "The Same Place", the band's first new music in 13 years. Hours later, it was announced that Hart died at age 53 earlier that same morning.

On July 17, 2026, the band announced their third and final studio album, The Same Place, released October 23.

== Artistry ==
The Olivia Tremor Control's music combines indie rock and neo-psychedelia. They were inspired by psychedelic pop bands of the 1960s, especially the Beatles and the Beach Boys, for their singing styles and the way they "blended trickery and interesting sounds with pop", according to Hart. Hart noted that he felt the band expanded on the sound of 1960s psychedelic pop with modern recording technology, creating more holistic songs and avoiding what he called "hippie jam sessions." Other influences include the recording techniques used by musique concrète musicians like Pierre Henry and John Cage, as well as 1990s indie rock bands like Pavement and Sebadoh. Doss said he wanted the Olivia Tremor Control's music to instill a sense of "mystery or happiness" in listeners. "I'm sending out a positive message, because the world needs it ... We're reaching for something that's hard to explain."

In addition to traditional pop and rock instruments such as guitars and drums, the band members also play the clarinet, flute, saxophone, theremin, violin, and xylophone. While discussing the band's dynamic sound, Paul Thompson of Pitchfork called it "some unthinkable matchup of Revolver-era Beatles or Smile-era Beach Boys, the tornado-alley skronk of 1980s Flaming Lips and Butthole Surfers, and the surreal wooze of post-Reichian tape manipulation." Music critic Nig Hodgkins noted that the Olivia Tremor Control faithfully incorporate many elements found in psychedelic music, including reverse echo, phasing, dreamlike vocals, and electronic sound effects.

== Members ==
- Will Cullen Hart – guitars, keyboards, percussion, vocals, songwriting (1994–2000, 2009–2024; died 2024)
- Bill Doss – guitars, cornet, keyboards, xylophone, percussion, vocals, songwriting (1994–2000, 2009–2012; died 2012)
- Jeff Mangum – drums, guitars, vocals (1994–1995)
- John Fernandes – bass, violin, saxophone, clarinet, vocals (1995–2000, 2009–2026)
- Eric Harris – drums, percussion, theremin, guitars, harmonica, vocals (1995–2000, 2009–2026)
- Peter Erchick – keyboards, guitars, bass, vocals (1996–2000, 2009–2026)
- Derek Almstead – guitars, bass, drums, percussion, vocals (2009–2026)
- AJ Griffin – guitar, backing vocals (2009–2026)

== Discography ==
- Music from the Unrealized Film Script: Dusk at Cubist Castle (1996)
- Black Foliage: Animation Music Volume One (1999)
- The Same Place (2026)
