= Emperor Norton Records =

U.S. record label

Emperor Norton Records was a Los Angeles-based electronica, hip-hop, and dance-music record label. Among the artists featured on the label were Ladytron, Arling & Cameron, Money Mark, Ugly Duckling, Phaser, and Fantastic Plastic Machine. Additionally, it released the soundtracks to movies including Lost in Translation, CQ and The Virgin Suicides.

The company was named after Joshua A. Norton, a San Francisco citizen noted for proclaiming himself Emperor of the United States and Protector of Mexico in 1859. The record label was founded by Peter Getty (grandson of the late billionaire J. Paul Getty), and the company was purchased by Rykodisc in 2004 and was then acrimoniously shut down later that year, with Rykodisc inheriting its back-catalog.

On March 23, 2006, it was announced that Warner Music Group acquired the Ryko Corporation for $67.5 million.

== Artists ==
- Air
- Arling and Cameron
- Buffalo Daughter
- Bertrand Burgalat
- Call & Response
- Cato Salsa Experience
- Cinemaphonic: Electro Soul
- Codec and Flexor
- Cords
- DJ Me DJ You
- Electrocute
- Fantastic Plastic Machine
- Felix Da Housecat
- Golden Boy
- Green Romance Orchestra
- Bruce Haack
- Ladytron
- Logan's Sanctuary
- The Maxwell Implosion
- Midnight Movies
- Takako Minekawa
- Miss Kittin
- Money Mark
- Mount Sims
- Ralph Myerz and the Jack Herren Band
- Olivia Tremor Control
- Pepe Deluxé
- Permafrost
- Phaser
- Schroeder's Cat
- Senor Coconut
- Soul Ecstasy
- Sunshine Fix
- Titán
- Ugly Duckling
- The Upper Crust
- Velma
- The Virgin-Whore Complex
- Zoobombs

== Soundtracks ==
- CQ
- Lost in Translation
- Thinking XXX
- The Virgin Suicides

== See also ==
- List of record labels
