= Jason Nesmith =

Jason Nesmith may refer to:

- Jason NeSmith, musician in the band Casper & the Cookies
- Jason Nesmith, fictional character in the film Galaxy Quest
- Jason Nesmith, guitarist in the band Nancy Boy, which was co-founded with Donovan Leitch Jr., and son of Michael Nesmith of The Monkees
