= Hollow Inside =

Hollow Inside may refer to:

- "Hollow Inside", a song by Buzzcocks from the album A Different Kind of Tension
- "Hollow Inside", a song by Enslaved from the album Monumension
- "Hollow Inside", a song by the Mighty Lemon Drops from the album World Without End
