= Happy Head =

Studio album by the Mighty Lemon Drops
- Released: 1986
- Genre: Rock; pop; neo-psychedelia
- Length: 36:33
- Label: Blue Guitar; Chrysalis
- Producer: Stephen Street

The Mighty Lemon Drops chronology
Happy Head (1986)	Out of Hand (1987)

Happy Head is the debut album by the English band the Mighty Lemon Drops, released in 1986. It peaked at No. 58 on the UK Albums Chart and was a hit on American college radio. The band supported the album with a UK tour and by opening for the Chameleons on a North American tour. The title track appeared on NME's C86. Happy Head was rereleased in 2022 as part of the Inside Out box set.

== Production ==
The album was produced by Stephen Street. Its music was influenced primarily by the Sex Pistols, the Teardrop Explodes, and Echo and the Bunnymen. Most of the songs were written by guitarist David Newton, with the entire band working on the arrangements. The album was recorded quickly; singer Paul Marsh later expressed dissatisfaction with the results. All of the songs are about relationships.

== Critical reception ==
Professional ratings
Review scores
Source	Rating
AllMusic	3.5/5 stars
The Encyclopedia of Popular Music	3/5 stars
Reno Gazette-Journal	3/5 stars
Tamworth Herald	3/5 stars

The Washington Post stated that "the sunny outlook and artless charm of the four-man group's debut LP Happy Head hearkens back to the days of mop-top pop". The Toronto Star noted the "blend of hard-nosed rhythms and nifty melodic hooks." The Chicago Tribune labeled the album "mainstream rock, much of [which] has an aggressive, forceful undercurrent that suggests a familiarity with the late-'70s punk scene in Britain." NME concluded that "the Mighty Lemon Drops teeter precariously on the brink of mediocrity."

The Gazette called it "catchy pop that mixes Byrds' guitars with Echo and the Bunnymen mood." The Omaha World-Herald said that Happy Head "benefits from the Lemon Drops' special blend of punk energy and pop instincts, a style not unlike Australia's Hoodoo Gurus." Trouser Press determined that it "offers the neo-psychedelia of early Echo played with a ringing Rickenbacker as the lead instrument and a less mannered (and less interesting) vocalist."

== Track listing ==
Happy Head track listing
No.	Title	Length
1.	"The Other Side of You"	2:42
2.	"My Biggest Thrill"	2:58
3.	"All the Way"	3:33
4.	"Hypnotised"	4:15
5.	"Like an Angel"	3:43
6.	"Behind Your Back"	3:19
7.	"Happy Head"	2:27
8.	"Pass You By"	3:31
9.	"Take Me Up"	2:51
10.	"On My Mind"	3:44
11.	"Something Happens"	3:38
12.	"Turn Me Round"	3:35
Total length:		36:33
