= Albatross: How We Failed to Save the Lone Star State with the Power of Rock and Roll =

Studio album by Fishboy
- Released: 2007, 2011
- Recorded: 2007
- Genre: Indie pop, Indie rock
- Length: 32:00
- Label: CD: HHBTM Vinyl: Fishstick Records

Fishboy chronology
Little D (2005)	Albatross: How We Failed to Save the Lone Star State with the Power of Rock and Roll (2007)	Nom (2009)

Albatross: How We Failed to Save the Lone Star State with the Power of Rock and Roll is the fifth album by Fishboy and the first of their records to be released on Happy Happy Birthday to Me Records. The album was released in 2007 and pressed to vinyl in 2011 by Fishstick Records.

The band describes the album as "A 2007 rock opera about how a young man, his band and the ghost of Buddy Holly attempt to save Texas by going a tour/crime spree in order to perform all 8030 of the songs he's written in his sleep since he was in the womb."

== Concept ==
Albatross is a concept album. It is a rock opera which tells the story of Fishboy, who has spent the first 22 years of his life writing songs alone in his room, in order to fulfill a prophecy made by his father, who believes that one of his songs will someday save the state of Texas. Each song is narrated in the first person.

== Plot summary ==
The story begins when Fishboy is "Minus Two" years old ("Minus Two".) He spends the two years prior to his birth dreaming of the things he will do once he enters the world. He is born singing a simple tune, and soon discovers he has the ability to write songs in his sleep. His father believes that a song he writes will one day save the state of Texas (it is never explained what he is expected to save Texas from) so he gives him a tape recorder and orders him to record everything he writes. Fishboy is so terrified of failing in this mission that he remains in his room until he is 22 years old, doing nothing but writing songs. Eventually, he finds he can no longer write, and finally emerges from his room.

The first thing he does is go skydiving, only to discover that his parachute is actually the ghost of Buddy Holly. The ghost encourages Fishboy to fulfill his destiny by finding and performing the fabled song, but warns him against falling in love, believing it will distract him. ("Parachute") In need of money, Fishboy gets a job at a taco stand, where he falls in love with a girl named Carleen Jean, who tells him to begin going on tour. Under her influence, Fishboy forms a band, obtains an armored car to use as a tour bus, and begins robbing banks to finance their trip. ("Taqueria Girl")

Fishboy has written over 8,000 songs, but has no idea which one is the song which will save Texas. Thus the band decides to perform them all, by driving to every town in Texas and performing different songs in each until they discover the right song. They continue robbing banks along the way, evading the police as they go ("Hard Earned Money," "Race Car.") The band sleeps in the van between gigs, and at night Fishboy finds himself contemplating how much he regrets his mistakes in life, particularly his decision not to leave his room for decades. He resigns himself to always carrying these regrets "like an albatross hangin' round my neck." ("Blackout Flashback".)

Eventually the band arrives in the town of Colleyville, where they are hired to play during halftime at a brutally unfair spelling bee. While they are playing, the police burst in and arrest them, revealing the event to have been a trap. ("Halftime at the Proper Name Spelling Bee.")

Fishboy manages to convince the police that only he is responsible for the bank robberies, taking the fall for the entire band's crimes. He becomes an instant celebrity as the news of his journey is reported by the media ("The Details of Our Trip") He represents himself at his trial, is found guilty and sentenced to life in prison. Fishboy feels relieved, however, because now he has a chance to make a new start of his life, even if it's in jail. Buddy Holly's ghost apologizes for starting him on this path, admitting that perhaps their mission to save Texas "was a little overhyped." ("Thought Balloon")

On the first day on his incarceration, Fishboy begins to hum a song, the same simple tune he sang on the day he was born. This, he realizes, is the destined song that would have saved Texas. ("Minus One") With this revelation, Fishboy resolves to continue writing songs, not out of some duty to save the state but simply because he loves to write. Having finally found inner peace, Fishboy lets go of his regrets. He makes new friends in prison, and sometimes they sing along to songs he has written. ("Farewell, Albatross")

== Track listing ==
1. "Minus Two" – 2:55
2. Parachute (Using the Ghost of Buddy Holly as a) – 2:54
3. Taqueria Girl – 2:17
4. Hard Earned Money – 2:01
5. Racecar – 3:52
6. Blackout (Flashback) – 2:30
7. Halftime at the Proper Name Spelling Bee – 3:15
8. The Details of Our Trip – 2:37
9. Thought Balloons – 3:43
10. Minus One – 2:10
11. Farewell, Albatross – 4:12
