= Bunnygrunt =

American indie pop band

- Origin: St. Louis, Missouri, U.S.
- Genres: Indie pop, cuddlecore
- Years active: 1993–1998; 2003–present
- Labels: Happy Happy Birthday to Me, No Life, Septophilia, WeePOP!, Pancake Productions
- Members: Matt Harnish; Karen Ried; Eric Von Damage
- Past members: Renee Dullum; Jen Wolfe; Lauren Trull
- Website: bunnygrunt.com

Bunnygrunt are an American indie pop band from St. Louis, Missouri composed of guitarist and vocalist Matt Harnish and drummer Karen Ried.

== History ==
The band formed in early 1993, with Wally Schwartz on bass. Their first release, the "Criminal Boy" 7-inch, came in the same year, on Silly Moo Records. In short order Rene Dullum took over the duties on bass. They continued to release 7-inchs and EPs, drawing attention for this and for their rapid release schedule, until they recorded their debut full-length in 1995, titled Action Pants!, released on No Life Records. This release was not without its problems. Dullum was fired from the band before the album was released, taking her songs with her. This meant that the album's running time was rather short – now being only 8 songs long, and around 20 minutes in length (partly due to the 10-minute-long "Open Wide and Say Oblina", the album's closer). The band then recruited bassist Jen Wolfe, and continued to release 7-inchs, including The Bunnygrunt Family Notebook, and Blue Christmas (a Christmas 7-inch, with their cover of the holiday standard on the one side, and an original, 'Season's Freaklings', on the other). In 1998, they released their second album, Jen-Fi, again on No Life. This had double the tracks of their first album, although the running time was again very brief, as few songs broke the 2 minute mark. The album attracted favourable reviews, yet the band disappeared soon after this, with little fanfare. Matt and Karen went on to form the See-Thrus. Later still Matt joined The Julia Sets and Karen formed The Fantasy Four.

In 2003, the earlier-recorded Bunnygrunt song 'Season's Freaklings' (also previously featured on a compilation entitled Better Than Fruitcake which was a forerunner to the Bert Dax Christmas compilations—see below) was used on the soundtrack to the Billy Bob Thornton movie, Bad Santa, enhancing the band's popularity. In the fall of 2004, a new collection of Bunnygrunt's old tracks and rarities, entitled In the Valley of Lonesome Phil, was released on Harnish's own label, "The Bert Dax Cavalcade of Stars". Ried had been playing with various local musicians as The Fantasy Four, and Harnish was busy at various pf local artists playing original and traditional holiday songs every Christmas season), playing bass for the St. Louis-based Julia Sets (who had a split EP with theoints since Bunnygrunt's secession into relative non-existence around 1998 with running his Bert Dax label (which releases, among other things, a compilation o Fantasy Four on the Bert Dax label in 2001), and working at popular local record store Vintage Vinyl. The band played a house party with Lauren Trull on bass to celebrate the release of Bad Santa and decided to reform full-time, playing the Athens PopFest (to which they have returned as recently as August 2010, and at which they are one of only three acts to appear every single year since its inception, alongside Cars Can Be Blue and Casper & the Cookies) later that year. The band released their latest album, Karen Haters Club, on Happy Happy Birthday To Me Records, in the fall of 2005. Trull has since left the band, and Ried and Harnish now continue officially as a two-piece, with Eric Von Damage (formerly of Corbeta Corbata and The Adversary Workers) on drums, though a set arsenal of regular guests with whom they play live shows and record has been established, including Jason Hutto of Walkie Talkie U.S.A. and Phonocaptors fame, Mario Viele of the Pubes and Sex Robots, as well as Erik Seaver of the Museum Mutters, Parker's Back, Lost to Metric, and the Five Deadly Venoms. At the 2007 Athens Popfest, Bunnygrunt was joined onstage by the horn section of HHBTM label-mates Red Pony Clock for a cover of Carmelita by Warren Zevon. At the 2010 Athens Popfest, Bunnygrunt was joined onstage by several friends for a cover of Red Pony Clock's "Don't Forget Who Your Friends Are."

In 2009, the band released a new full length on HHBTM entitled Matt Harnish and Other Delights. Pancake Productions released two Bunnygrunt 7-inch records, "Lady, You Just Got Von Damaged" in 2010 and "The Worst Of Both Worlds" (a split with The Winchester and with Throwing Things Records) in 2012. The title of "...Von Damaged" is in keeping with their tradition of naming records after members of the band, Eric Von Damage having been Bunnygrunt's drummer for the majority of years since their reunion. The cover of the record is an embroidery painting of Von Damage lounging in a chair with a bulldog nearby and a macaw on his shoulder.

Bunnygrunt's sixth (or fifth, depending on how you are counting) album Vol. 4 was released in July 2015 on HHBTM. The cassette and CD versions featured bonus tracks from singles and other records released since (and even before) their previous album, including the two Pancake Productions 45s and the WeePOP! EP.

=== Tribute album ===
In late August 2013, Pancake Productions released You Wanna Be Just Like Bunnygrunt: A Loving Tribute to the First 21½ Years. It features 26 covers of Bunnygrunt songs from all eras of the band by label-mates, friends, and a variety of acts from around the globe, including members of longtime tour partners Tullycraft and Darling Little Jackhammer as well as other bands containing former members such as The Sex Robots and Jason Hutto, and other friends including The Ottomen, Red Pony Clock, Casper & The Cookies, and Googolplexia.

== Style ==
During their original lifespan, Bunnygrunt's sound changed only marginally, being centred on a sound that was primarily labelled as twee pop or cuddlecore, which led to Allmusic naming them 'The World's Cutest Band'. While the accuracy of this label is open to dispute, it is clear that the band themselves were not happy with being presented in this way, or indeed even being classified as 'twee', due to the connotations associated with such a label (deliberately sloppy instrumentalism, overly 'cutesy' presentation). Indeed, Harnish noted that he "hated" the label, and this aspect of twee music.

However, the band's position as twee was only solidified when their first major show after their 2004 reformation took place at the Athens PopFest, a music festival organised by noted twee label Happy Happy Birthday To Me Records, who also released Karen Haters Club. The style of music prevalent on this album, however, is not exactly what one might call twee pop, the band creating a far heavier sound, more akin to simple punk rock. However, the band's twee label persists, though mainly by association.

== Discography ==
=== Albums ===
- Action Pants! (No Life Records, 1995)
- Jen-Fi (No Life Records, 1998)
- In the Valley Of Lonesome Phil, (The Bert Dax Cavalcade of Stars, 2004)
- Karen Haters Club (Happy Happy Birthday To Me Records, 2005)
- Matt Harnish and Other Delights (Happy Happy Birthday To Me Records, 2009)
- Vol 4 (2015)

=== EPs/Singles ===
- Criminal Boy (7-inch, 1993)
- The Northerns Meet Bunnygrunt (7-inch, World Control Records, 1994)
- Standing Hampton (7-inch, No Life Records, 1994)
- Bunnygrunt Family Notebook (7-inch, March Records, 1995)
- Split with Beanpole, Wack Cat, and Recycled Pop ("Repulsion" on "Pop Goes the World" 7-inch, Love Me Not... Records)
- Split with Lydia's Trumpet, Crime Squad, Darling Little Jackhammer, Mr. Pink Jeans, the Northerns, and Give Her a Lizard ("Spot the Mommyhead" on "Roller Skates" 7-inch, unmarked Silly Moo)
- Johnny Angel (7-inch, Septophilia, 1996)
- Blue Christmas (7-inch, Septophilia, 1996)
- Team Bunnygrunt Vs. Team Tullycraft (7-inch, KittyBoo Records, 1997)
- Split with B'ehl, Kitty Craft, Naysay, and Tummybug ("I Mock You With My Monkey Pants" on "Bumping Up and Down" 7-inch, Little Red Wagon Recordings, 1999)
- The 1000% Hot EP (EP, WeePOP! Records, 2007)
- Split with Phil Wilson (7-inch, Happy Happy Birthday To Me Records, 2007)
- Split with Sex Robots (7-inch, The Bert Dax Cavalcade Of Stars, 2008)
- Lady, You Just Got Von Damaged! (7-inch, Pancake Productions, 2010)
- The Worst Of Both Worlds (7-inch split with The Winchester, Pancake Productions and Throwing Things Records, 2012)
