= Turn and Face Me =

Album by The Blood Arm

Studio album by The Blood Arm
- Released: June 3, 2011 (Germany); July 4, 2011 (worldwide)
- Genres: Indie rock, garage rock
- Label: Pau! Records / Snowhite
- Producers: The Blood Arm, Dave Newton, Josiah Mazzaschi

The Blood Arm chronology
Lie Lover Lie (2006)	Turn and Face Me (2011)	Infinite Nights (2013)

Singles from Turn and Face Me
- 1. "All My Love Songs" Released: November 15, 2010; 2. "Relentless Love" Released: June 27, 2011; 3. "She's a Guillotine" Released: October 1, 2011

Turn and Face Me is the third studio album by Los Angeles band the Blood Arm, released worldwide on July 4, 2011, almost five years after their previous album Lie Lover Lie. Recorded in Burbank, California, it was produced by David Newton, from the popular late '80s band the Mighty Lemon Drops.

== Release and reception ==
Turn and Face Me received generally positive reviews. In their 8/10 review, Punk Rock ist nicht tot described the album as "bubbly, infectious, inventive pop" and "fun with a capital ‘F’" while Q Magazine called the album "playfully knowing indie rock that could almost be a collision between The Scots and The Boomtown Rats", though the album also drew comparisons with Roxy Music, Kevin Rowland and the Doors.

The band promoted the album with a lengthy European tour, beginning and eventually culminating in Germany. The promotional tour included an appearance on Berlin Live (a popular music show from Berlin) alongside Art Brut and dEUS.

Professional ratings
Review scores
Source	Rating
Drowned in Sound	link
punkrockistnichttot	link
Arctic Reviews	link
Panic Dots	link
Q Magazine	link
The AU Review	link
Subba-cultcha	link
Loud & Quiet Magazine	link

== Track listing ==
No.	Title	Length
1.	"She's a Guillotine"	2:30
2.	"I Need You"	1:59
3.	"Relentless Love"	3:19
4.	"Introducing Randy Newman"	2:11
5.	"Friends for Now"	3:13
6.	"Temporary Woman"	3:51
7.	"The Creditors"	2:56
8.	"All My Love Songs"	3:26
9.	"Starved of Affection"	2:31
10.	"D-D-D-D-D-Dementia"	2:47
11.	"Don't Let Him Break Your Heart"	4:22
12.	"Forever Is Strange"	2:38
Total length:		35:42

== Credits ==
- Nathaniel Fregoso – vocals
- Zebastian Carlisle – guitar
- Dyan Valdes – keyboards
- Zachary Amos – drums
- Louis Castle – trumpet

Produced by The Blood Arm, David Newton & Josiah Mazzaschi.
