= Rat Fancy =

American music duo

- Origin: California, United States
- Genres: Power pop, indie rock
- Years active: 2016–present
- Labels: Happy Happy Birthday to Me Records, Solidarity Club Records
- Members: Diana Barraza; Gregory Johnson
- Website: Official URL

Rat Fancy are an American musical duo who formed in late 2016 following the dissolution of Barraza’s previous band Sweater Girls. The duo released their debut EP Suck a Lemon on Happy Happy Birthday to Me Records in 2017. The band has played festivals including SXSW, Athens Popfest, San Francisco Popfest and Oakland Popfest.

Produced by David Newton of the Mighty Lemon Drops, Rat Fancy’s first album Stay Cool was released in 2019 to positive reviews. The cassette version of the LP was released on Solidarity Club Records.

In June 2019, they were featured on The A.V. Club’s list of "favorite queer rock of 2019".

== Discography ==
=== Albums ===
- Stay Cool (12-inch LP, MP3) (2019), HHBTM Records, Solidarity Club Records (cassette)

=== Extended plays ===
- Suck a Lemon (12-inch LP, MP3) (2017), HHBTM Records
