= Keith John Adams =

British singer-songwriter

Keith John Adams is a British singer-songwriter. He makes garage pop music on his own and with a number of revolving collaborators, some from the UK and some from the US. His band since 2015 is Keith John Adams and the Wildlife, a trio with Matt Armstrong on double-bass and Mark Braby on stand-up drums.

He has released four solo albums: Sunshine Loft (2003), Pip (2005) Unclever (2007) and Roughhousing (2014). Roughhousing was released on vinyl as a co-release on four labels: Vacilando '68 in the UK, Red Wig in Germany, PIAPTK and Gray Sky Press from the US. Several tracks on it received airplay on BBC 6 Music in the UK. Unclever was recorded after an extensive tour with Casper & the Cookies, and featured Cookies members Kay Stanton and Jason NeSmith. Before his solo career, he fronted the British experimental pop band, Zuno Men. In this band he played acoustic guitar and sung.

Singles with the Zuno Men included:

- "Stay In With Me" (April 1998)

His record label in the US is Happy Happy Birthday to Me Records, also known as HHBTM. His latest album, Unclever, was released in the US in 2008 on that label.

- "Everybody Was Right" (September 1998)
- "This Is The Beginning" (May 1999)
