= Lie Lover Lie =

Studio album by The Blood Arm
- Released: 16 October 2006
- Genres: Indie rock, indie pop, garage rock
- Label: City Rockers
- Producers: The Blood Arm & Ariel Rechtshaid.

The Blood Arm chronology
| Bomb Romantics (2004) | Lie Lover Lie (2006) | Turn And Face Me (2011) |

Singles from Lie Lover Lie
- 1. "Suspicious Character" Released: 25 September 2006; 2. "Angela" Released: 21 May 2007; 3. "Do I Have Your Attention?" Released: 15 October 2007

Lie Lover Lie is the second album by The Blood Arm. It was released in 2006.

== Release and reception ==
The album received mainly positive reviews. British newspaper The Guardian awarded the album full marks, describing it as "an alternative dancefloor gem". Jeff Terich of Treble called the album "ecstatic, extravagant rock `n' roll", praising the band's ability to "lay down some fuckin' hits" and declaring them "the band that is giving rock a much-needed kick in the pants". British music magazine NME were also quick to praise the band, noting their "absolutely spiffo corkers-to-hummers ratio".

In 2007 the band played on an NME sponsored Rock 'N' Roll Riot US Tour alongside The Hold Steady, Demander, Federale, 1990s and Art Brut.

Professional ratings
Review scores
| Source | Rating |
|---|---|
| Drowned in Sound | link |
| Contactmusic.com | link |
| The Guardian | link |
| DIY | link |
| Music OMH | link |
| Leeds Music Scene | link |

== Track listing ==
| No. | Title | Length |
|---|---|---|
| 1. | "Stay Put!" | 3:17 |
| 2. | "Accidental Soul" | 3:29 |
| 3. | "Suspicious Character" | 3:16 |
| 4. | "Angela" | 3:25 |
| 5. | "The Chasers" | 2:45 |
| 6. | "Going To Arizona" | 3:24 |
| 7. | "Do I Have Your Attention?" | 3:35 |
| 8. | "Mass murder" | 2:51 |
| 9. | "Visionaries" | 2:40 |
| 10. | "PS I Love You But Don't Miss You" | 2:47 |
| 11. | "Dolores Delivers A Glorious Death" | 4:25 |
| Total length: | | 36:41 |

=== iTunes Deluxe Edition ===
Bonus Tracks
| No. | Title | Length |
|---|---|---|
| 12. | "Do I Have Your Attention (w. Anaïs)" | 3:43 |
| 13. | "Pen Dragon" | 4:35 |
| 14. | "The Killer at Large" | 3:23 |

== Credits ==
- Nathaniel Fregoso – Vocals
- Zebastian Carlisle – Guitars
- Dyan Valdes – Keyboards
- Zachary Amos – Drums

Produced by The Blood Arm, Dave Newton

== Charts ==
Chart performance for Lie Lover Lie
| Chart (2006) | Peak position |
|---|---|
| French Albums (SNEP) | 200 |
| German Albums (Offizielle Top 100) | 100 |
| UK Albums (Official Charts) | 181 |
| UK Independent Albums (Official Charts) | 9 |
