= Sound ... Goodbye to Your Standards =

Studio album by the Mighty Lemon Drops
- Released: 1991
- Genre: Alternative rock
- Label: Sire/Reprise
- Producer: Andy Paley

The Mighty Lemon Drops chronology
Laughter (1989)	Sound ... Goodbye to Your Standards (1991)	Ricochet (1992)

Sound ... Goodbye to Your Standards is an album by the English band the Mighty Lemon Drops, released in 1991.

The album's first single was "Unkind", which peaked at No. 28 on Billboard's Modern Rock Tracks chart. The band supported the album by touring with Sister Double Happiness; they were also part of the ill-fated 1991 festival A Gathering of the Tribes.

== Production ==
The album was produced by Andy Paley. About half of the songs were written by guitar player David Newton. The album was recorded live in the studio, in about two weeks. Most of its songs are about relationship issues.

== Critical reception ==
Professional ratings
Review scores
Source	Rating
AllMusic	2/5 stars
Calgary Herald	B-
The Encyclopedia of Popular Music	3/5 stars
Houston Chronicle	2.5/4 stars
MusicHound Rock: The Essential Album Guide	2/5 stars
The Tampa Tribune	3/4 stars

Trouser Press wrote: "Stumbling through faint stabs at blues, beat-era rock'n'roll and ravedelia, the group sounds lost and bored, a plight exacerbated by the dire production, which is not only flat and sloppy but inconsistent at that." Spin panned the "excessive echo, non-distinct, nondescript vocals, and inefficient layers of guitar." The Indianapolis Star opined that "the Drops nearly redeem the lackluster material with some sterling performances."

The St. Petersburg Times determined that "dream-like melodies, stoked by '60s-flavored rhythms, steal effective moments in cuts such as 'Unkind', 'My Shadow Girl' and 'Too High'." The Los Angeles Times deemed the album "perhaps the group's best effort, due to pop-master Andy Paley's production and musical collaboration." The Calgary Herald stated: "Soft and accessible, it's also too safe and a little bit too familiar."

AllMusic wrote that "Sound is a reminder of how most alternative rock, in the months before Nirvana broke, was just as boring and predictable as anything in the mainstream."

== Track listing ==
No.	Title	Length
1.	"Too High"
2.	"Unkind"
3.	"My Shadow Girl"
4.	"Barry's Poem"
5.	"Always"
6.	"Big Surprise"
7.	"Cold, Cold Heart"
8.	"Annabelle"
9.	"You Don't Appreciate Anything"
10.	"Colorful-Loving-Me"
11.	"Ready, Steady, No!"
