= Death to Anders =

American indie rock band

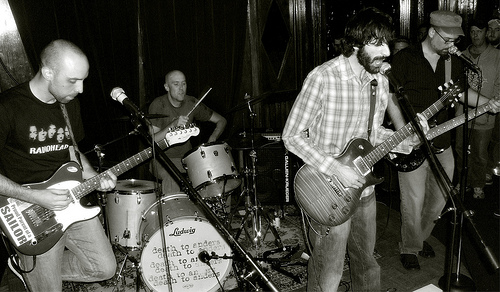
- Nick Ceglio, John Broeckel, Rob Danson, and Peter DiBiasio (left to right) live at Three Clubs in Hollywood on January 14, 2009

Background information
- Also known as: The Thick Liquid Sucker Punch
- Origin: Los Angeles, California, USA
- Genres: indie rock, alternative rock, experimental rock, college rock, alternative country
- Years active: 2006–present
- Members: Rob Danson; Rob Hume; Robert Smith
- Past members: Anders Griffen; Nick Ceglio; Pete Dibiasio; John Broekel

Death to Anders (pronounced "onders") is an American indie rock band formed in Los Angeles, California in 2006. Their current lineup consists of Rob Danson (vocals, guitar), Rob Hume (bass, backing vocals), and Robert Smith (drums).

Death to Anders is active in the influential Echo Park and Silver Lake music scenes in Los Angeles. They were founding members of the Central Second Collective, a group of up-and-coming rock musicians dedicated to promoting innovative, new music in Los Angeles.

Often compared to Pavement, early Modest Mouse, and Sonic Youth, Death to Anders shifts between hypnotic melodies and raging dissonance as they mix rock with Gothic Americana.

== Formation and history ==
Death to Anders was first formed as a duo in 2004 under the name "Thick Liquid Sucker Punch", by Danson and original guitarist Nick Ceglio, while the two were students at the Musician's Institute in Hollywood, California. While most of their classmates were interested in heavy metal or progressive rock, the two bonded over their shared enthusiasm for Sonic Youth, the Pixies, and Pavement.

Death to Anders self-produced their first album, "Punctuate the Calamities" in the Fall of 2006. After recording with British producer David Newton (formerly of the Mighty Lemon Drops) at Rollercoaster Recording in 2007, they released two albums in 2008: a full-length album entitled "Fictitious Business" and an EP entitled "Enigmatic Market". In 2010, Danson re-formed Death to Anders as a trio featuring bassist Rob Hume and drummer Robert Smith.

In 2011, the band released a new EP entitled "Don't Give Up". It was recorded at Infrasonic Sound and mixed by Ali Nikou at Blaster Master Productions in Los Angeles. The EP was released on October 25, 2011 at The Echo in Echo Park, California, where the group performed as part of LA blog Buzz Bands' three-year anniversary show alongside bands such as Everest and Hands.

== Musical style and influences ==
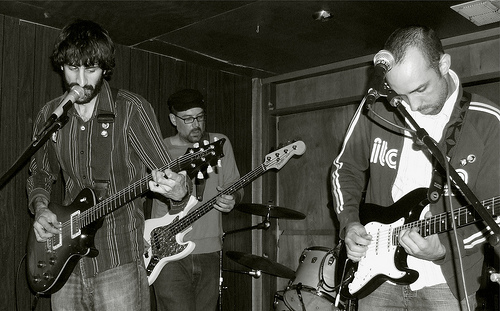
Danson, DiBiasio, and Ceglio (left to right) live at Tokyo Garden in Fresno, California on December 4, 2008

The dissonant tones, dynamic melodies, and complex song structures that shape their sound reveal a broad array of influences and reflect the diversity of its members. The band integrates genres as varied as punk rock, indie rock, and alternative country. While their work has been compared to Pavement, early Modest Mouse, the Pixies, and Sonic Youth, it is also described as difficult to classify, "radical", and "fresh".

Death to Anders is also known for its intelligent, darkly humorous, and often mysterious lyrics, which are written by Danson and Ceglio and inspired by the literary works of Henry Miller, Albert Camus, Fyodor Dostoevsky, Tom Robbins, and Chuck Palahniuk. The title of the band's debut album, "Punctuate the Calamities", is a reference to Miller's Tropic of Cancer.

== Discography ==
=== Albums ===
- Punctuate the Calamities (self-released, 2006)
- Fictitious Business (self-released, produced by David Newton, 2008)

=== EPs and singles ===
- "Punctuate the Calamities" (self-released, produced by Death to Anders, 2006)
- "Fictitious Business" (self released, produced by David Newton, 2008)
- "Enigmatic Market EP" (self-released, produced by David Newton, 2008)
- "Don't Give Up" (self-released, produced by Eric Palmquist and Death to Anders, 2011)
