= Laughter (The Mighty Lemon Drops album) =

Studio album by the Mighty Lemon Drops
- Released: September 26, 1989
- Recorded: Real World, Bath, England
- Genres: Alternative rock, college rock, indie rock
- Length: 50:40
- Labels: Chrysalis, Sire
- Producers: Mark Wallis, Tim Palmer, Simon Vinestock, the Mighty Lemon Drops

The Mighty Lemon Drops chronology
World Without End (1988)	Laughter (1989)	Sound ... Goodbye to Your Standards (1991)

Laughter is the third studio album by English rock group The Mighty Lemon Drops. Released on Chrysalis/Sire in 1989, the first album was the band's first to feature David Newton as the primary songwriter, because co-writer and bassist Tony Linehan quit early during the recording sessions. The album contains the hit U.S. modern rock singles "Into the Heart of Love" and "Where Do We Go from Heaven".

== Background and recording ==
The Mighty Lemon Drops, feeling wrongly pigeonholed from their previous works as a "doom and gloom" band, decided in early 1989 to name their new album Laughter to reflect the group's shift in musical direction and to distance themselves from other bands with whom they had often been compared. Guitarist and songwriter David Newton explained, "There's definitely more lightness as opposed to all the dark stuff we've done. We wanted to lose all that. People are really amazed when they hear us. The press would lead you to believe that the only reason we exist is because of Echo and the Bunnymen. I don't even like them."

During the sessions for Laughter, bassist and co-writer Tony Linehan left the band after recording two tracks for the album, "All That I Can Do" and "Second Time Around". In a 2012 interview, Newton said of Linehan's departure: "We had spent the best part of four years with each other most days, and that will magnify any differences personality-wise or musically you might have. It was a stupid situation really and Tony now considers it a mistake on his part to leave, but we were also still quite young and things like this happen." Linehan was replaced by Marcus Williams, who had played with Julian Cope. Singer Paul Marsh credited Williams for bringing a fresh approach to the band which helped result in the poppier direction evident on Laughter, which features a horn section, layered guitars, and a live sound.

== Reception ==
Professional ratings
Review scores
Source	Rating
AllMusic	3.5/5 stars

Released in September 1989, Laughter produced two singles that reached the top 10 of the U.S. Modern Rock Tracks chart: "Into the Heart of Love" (number five) and "Where Do We Go from Heaven" (number eight). The album peaked at number 195 on the Billboard 200 in March 1990.

Dave Schulps and Ira Robbins of Trouser Press called Laughter "an altogether great album which remains by far the band's best" and compared it to the "psychedelically tinged pop joy of Stone Roses' debut, released in the same year". Robin Reinhardt of Spin said Laughter combines the "raw energy of Happy Head with the fuller, tighter sounds of World Without End". Reviews from the British press were generally less positive, however, leading the band to concentrate its promotion efforts in the U.S., including a 70-date concert tour with labelmates the Ocean Blue and John Wesley Harding.

== Track listing ==
All tracks are written by David Newton, except where noted.

No.	Title	Writer(s)	Length
1.	"At Midnight"		4:29
2.	"Into the Heart of Love"		2:56
3.	"Where Do We Go from Heaven"		5:41
4.	"The Heartbreak Thing"		6:18
5.	"One in a Million"		4:37
6.	"Written in Fiction"		3:35
7.	"The Real World"		5:53
8.	"All That I Can Do"	Tony Linehan, Newton	4:32
9.	"Second Time Around"	Linehan, Newton	3:53
10.	"Beautiful Shame"		3:31

CD bonus track
No.	Title	Writer(s)	Length
11.	"Rumbletrain?"	Paul Marsh, Newton, Keith Rowley, Marcus Williams	5:15

2008 reissue bonus tracks
No.	Title	Writer(s)	Length
12.	"Sometimes Good Guys Don't Wear White"	Ed Cobb	2:57
13.	"Where Do We Go from Heaven?" (Chris Lord-Alge remix edit)		4:26
14.	"Forever Home at Heart"		3:13
15.	"At Midnight" (live)		4:24
16.	"Like an Angel" (live)		3:41
17.	"Budweiser Commercial"		1:01
18.	"At Midnight" (alternate mix)		4:51
19.	"Written in Fiction" (alternate mix)		3:24

== Personnel ==
The Mighty Lemon Drops

- Paul Marsh – vocals
- David Newton – guitars, backing vocals
- Marcus Williams – bass guitar, backing vocals on tracks 1–7, 10, 11
- Keith Rowley – drums
- Tony Linehan – bass guitar on tracks 8, 9

Additional

- Ian Devaney – brass
- Luís Jardim – percussion
- Stevie Lange – backing vocals
- Andy Morris – brass
- Alex White – keyboards

== Charts ==
Chart (1990)	Peak position
US Billboard 200	195
