= Tom Gorrio =

Tom Gorrio is a Peruvian-American singer-songwriter based in Miami, Florida. Tom expressed early interest in music while growing up in the United States and traveling back and forth from Lima, Peru. His family worked in various industries before becoming involved in the Karaoke industry in the United States. Spanish music and Latin dance were a large part of Tom's life growing up and have had an influence on his music, which has a distinctly Spanish and world music themes. Tom's parents are avid dancers in the Miami Salsa and Meringue communities and great supporters of his music.

Gorrio is the primary songwriter and performer for Baby Calendar, Call it Radar, and former project Lasso the Moon. Since 2004, he has performed as Tom Gorrio and has released two EPs as part of this project, which in the past has featured guest Miami musicians including Jackie Biver and Arik Dayan of Baby Calendar. Gorrio is scheduled to perform at the 2008 Athens Popfest and is affiliated with Happy Happy Birthday to Me Records.
