= Kenny Howes =

Musical artist (born 1970)

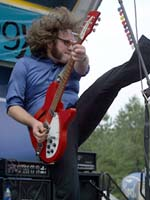
- Kenny Howes onstage in 2000

Background information
- Born: 10 February 1970 (age 56)
- Origin: Mulberry, Florida, US
- Genre: Power pop
- Instruments: Guitar, piano, combo organ, brass
- Years active: 1990–present
- Labels: AAJ, YEAH!, RIC Media

Kenny Howes (born February 10, 1970) is an American musician primarily in the power pop genre.

== History ==
Raised in Mulberry, Florida, United States, Howes began his musical endeavors at the age of ten by simultaneously learning the guitar and piano at home and the French horn at school.

Through his musical ferocity for the Beatles, he quickly became proficient on these and other instruments. By his teens, Howes was performing regularly with many local garage cover bands in a variety of styles, including punk, new wave, new romantic, Paisley Underground, folk/acoustic, and AOR rock/heavy metal.

In 1989, after graduating from Mulberry High School and then Polk Community College, Howes attended Florida State University in Tallahassee, and while there began his recording career, following the breakup of his band The Mustardseeds and after a stint with local faves Zombie Birdhouse.

Overdubbing all voices and instruments (except drums, performed by schoolmate Kelly Shane), Howes released his first collection Nothing Wrong With That first as a DIY cassette EP in 1993 and then (after adding four songs) as a full-length CD in 1995.

After an East Coast US solo tour, he then recorded and released his CD Kenny Howes' Second Album in early 1996, which had favorable reviews and is known not only for the song "Girls With Glasses" ("one of the finest power pop tracks of the '90s", said reviewer John Borack), but also for its cover art, which parodies The Beatles' Second Album. In addition to favorable reviews, Kenny Howes' Second Album was ranked number 157 on The 200 Greatest Power Pop Albums list in the 2007 book Shake Some Action: The Ultimate Power Pop Guide.

This disc once again featured only Howes and Shane, who had begun performing live as Kenny Howes and the Curious Yellow, along with guitarist Bob Anthony, bassist Ben Pringle (later of Nerf Herder and the Rentals), and Chuck Vaughan on combo organ (later replacing Pringle on bass). The band embarked on an East Coast tour in early 1996.

In 1996, Howes and drummer Kelly Shane relocated to the Atlanta, Georgia area, and began work on Howes' next CD Back to You Today! (released 1998). The disc's cover art was an unintentional nod to Grand Funk Railroad's "Pointing Finger" logo.

While piecing together a new group, Howes joined the psychedelic pop band Orange Hat (playing the Vox Continental organ), with whom he recorded the CD Pufferfish and continued to perform live until 2002. He rejoined Orange Hat ten years later, and continues to record and perform with the band.

In 1998 a lineup stabilized for his new group, Kenny Howes & the Yeah!, comprising Howes, Shane, guitarist Jason NeSmith (of Orange Hat, later of Casper and the Cookies) and bassist Kyle Harris (later of The Diamond Center). The group was a popular draw in both the Atlanta and Athens, GA indie rock scenes.

Also, starting in 1998, Howes also began performing regularly at the annual International Pop Overthrow music festival in Los Angeles. He would typically perform with local L.A. backing musicians, although KH&Y did perform at the festival as a group in 2000, at the El Rey Theatre.

In 2000, Howes signed a licensing/distribution deal with short-lived indie label SecondHeaven.com, who released The Right Idea, a compilation of remixed songs from Howes' first three CD releases, which were now out of print.

Kenny appears briefly in Glenn Tilbrook's film One for the Road, accompanying the Squeeze frontman in an impromptu 2001 living room concert in Atlanta.

Howes and his band began work on their first group recording in 2000 at Chase Park Transduction studios in Athens, Georgia, recorded by NeSmith and David Barbe of Sugar. (Some pre-production was done in Hoboken, NJ with producer Don Fleming.) These sessions, which featured a re-working of Kirsty MacColl's "They Don't Know", were released in a small run of CDs on Royal Fuzz Records as Kenny Howes & the Yeah! in late 2001; the album was re-titled Until Dawn and re-released on TallBoy Records in 2002, to greater distribution and acclaim.

TallBoy Records also commissioned KH&Y to contribute to a special 7-inch record containing four artists' renditions of the Move's "Do Ya", which was released in 2002. The group also contributed a recording of Wings' "Venus and Mars/Rock Show" to the Demagogue Records compilation Love in Song: An Atlanta Tribute To Sir Paul McCartney (2000).

KH&Y disbanded in December 2001. Howes performed with a new lineup in the Atlanta area for most of 2002; he then toured the northeast and midwest US with fellow singer/songwriter Robbie Rist in October of that year.

Before relocating to Southern California in 2003, Howes began recording his CD Lady Friend in Hoschton, Georgia, releasing it in 2004. The title track was written by David Crosby and originally recorded by the Byrds in 1967; the CD's cover art featured a Honda Super Cub motorcycle.

While in California, Howes performed as a member of San Diego garage-pop band the Shambles and occasionally with Pat DiNizio of the Smithereens, while continuing to play solo and band shows of his own material. Howes also collaborated on a side project, Hautewerk, who recorded and released the disc Stop Start Again, and, in April 2009, licensed three songs to the Rock Band video game.

Howes was also a member of The PopDudes, a lighthearted cover band of rotating members who perform annually at the International Pop Overthrow festival in Los Angeles. The group recorded a version of ABBA's first single, "Waterloo", which was included on the 2006 compilation CD International Pop Overthrow (Volume 9).

Howes released a compilation of his early recordings, Holding Up the Sound, in October 2010, and toured to US East Coast for five weeks in support.

He was also a master teacher at Huntington Beach High School's Academy for the Performing Arts, assisting and coaching the academy's students for their Commercial Recording Arts Department's biannual performances, a role he had begun in 2004 and continues on occasion.

From November 2011 to June 2012, Howes played 12-string bass in Pat DiNizio's "Confessions of a Rock Star" band, performing with the Smithereens frontman six nights a week at The Riviera Hotel & Casino in Las Vegas. Upon the closing of the Las Vegas show, Howes relocated to Atlanta, Georgia, where he performs regularly with his Atlanta-based band, Kenny Howes & The Wow.

Power Pop Prime, Vol. 1- The Not Lame Years, a book chronicling underground power pop artists from 1995 to 1997, was published by Not Lame Media in 2012 and featured a chapter interviewing Howes, as well as listing his disc Kenny Howes' Second Album in the book's listing of The Top 100 Indie Power Pop Releases of the 1990s.

In late 2011, Howes completed work on, Tornadoes Here & Past, which was released November 2012. Georgia music magazine Stomp and Stammer wrote "more ambitious than Howes' previous records...his best of them all." Pat DiNizio and the Church's Marty Willson-Piper appear as special guests.

He also performed occasionally as the fill-in bassist for the Smithereens, including the closing night of famed New York City nightclub Kenny's Castaways in October 2012, for their June 2013 dates supporting Tom Petty and The Heartbreakers, and for a 2014 performance at Asbury Park, New Jersey's Stone Pony, which was simulcast on Yahoo LiveNation. Following DiNizio's death in December 2017, Howes performed with the surviving members of The Smithereens and others at the Count Basie Theatre in New Jersey at "Time and Time Again: A Celebration Of Pat DiNizio", in January 2018.

An expanded version of Kenny's band, billed as Kenny Howes And Friends, performed The Beatles' Revolver album, with guest singers and auxiliary instrumentation, in honor of that album's 50th Anniversary in August 2016. The Atlanta performance sold out, inspiring Howes and Friends to begin a series of annual Beatles 50th Anniversary shows, commemorating the respective year's material, up through 1969/2019.

In February 2017, Kenny released a music video for his new single, "She Knows What I Mean".

In July 2017, Howes joined the Retro Futura Tour, a nationwide package American tour, as bass guitarist for Katrina of the Waves, Paul Young, and, for select shows, Annabella of Bow Wow Wow.

In November 2018, Kenny performed on bass with Don Fleming for two Velvet Monkeys reunion shows that were part of a series of concerts in honor of Henry Owings' 50th Birthday.

Howes celebrated the 20th Anniversary of his compilation CD The Right Idea in February 2020 with an Atlanta performance featuring an expanded version of Kenny Howes and The Wow.

== Discography ==
=== Albums ===
- Nothing Wrong With That, AAJ Records, 1995 (CD)
- Kenny Howes' Second Album, AAJ Records, 1996 (CD)
- Back To You Today!, AAJ/Shoeleg Records, 1998 (CD)
- Kenny Howes & the Yeah!, Royal Fuzz Records, 2001 (CD)
- Until Dawn [re-release of Kenny Howes & the Yeah!], TallBoy Records, 2002 (CD)
- Lady Friend, YEAH! Records, 2004 (CD)
- Tornadoes Here & Past, YEAH! Records, 2012 (vinyl LP / download)

=== Compilation albums ===
- The Right Idea, Second Heaven Records, 2000 (CD)
- Holding Up The Sound, YEAH! Records, 2010 (CD)

=== EPs ===
- Nothing Wrong With That, DIY release, 1993 (cassette)
- In Between, DIY release, 1994 (cassette)

=== Singles ===
- "Somebody" / "Greatest Thing Around", AAJ Records, 1994 (7-inch)
- "She Knows What I Mean", YEAH! Records, 2017 (download)

=== Various artist compilation appearances ===
- The World's Best Powerpop Compilation...Really, Not Lame Recordings, 1998, "Easy on the Eye" (CD)
- Pop Till You Drop, S'more Records, 1999, "Girls With Glasses" (CD)
- Love in Song: An Atlanta Tribute to Sir Paul McCartney, Demagogue Records, 2000, "Venus & Mars / Rock Show" (CD)
- Do Ya?, Tallboy Records, 2002, "Do Ya" (7-inch)
- Bands Best Friend, 2003, "The Truth Is" (CD)
- International Pop Overthrow (Volume 9), Not Lame Recordings, 2006, "Waterloo" with The PopDudes (CD)
