= Zipbangboom =

Studio album by Fishboy
- Released: 2003
- Recorded: 2003
- Genres: Indie pop, Indie rock
- Label: Business Deal Records

Fishboy chronology
Tim Fly's Cause He's Having Fun (2000)	Zipbangboom (2003)	Little D (2005)

Zipbangboom is the third album by Fishboy.

== Track listing ==
1. Aye Aye Sucka Sucka
2. Ray the Mover
3. The Contents of Your Pocket
4. Carpet Diem (Russell's Dream)
5. Onomatopoeia
6. Talking to the Doctor after Pressing the Elevator Button that Grew on Your Forehead Overnight, Causing Your Legs to Grow Uncontrollably
7. Bathtub (Brushing My Teeth)
8. Saving Lincoln
9. 4-Legged Car
10. The Pencil Sharpener
11. How Do I Grow
12. Giant Ear
13. Monopatomia (The End)
