= Velcro Stars =

- Origin: Murfreesboro, Tennessee
- Genres: Jangle-Pop
- Years active: 2000–present
- Labels: Happy Happy Birthday to Me; Grand Palace Records
- Website: http://www.velcrostars.com

The Velcro Stars are an indie pop band based in Murfreesboro, Tennessee. They began with Columbia natives Shane Spresser and Keith Pratt playing guitar and writing songs together after high school. They were joined in 2001 by Rebekah Kidd, who married Spresser the next year. Danial Norman was a high school acquaintance and joined them as their bassist in 2001 as well. After going through several drummers, Andy Spore filled the position, playing with them in 2005.

The band was active throughout 2006 playing shows and recording the album "Hiroshima's Revenge" and shooting a music video to support the upcoming release. "Hiroshima's Revenge" was joint-released by Grand Palace Records (Murfreesboro, TN) and Happy Happy Birthday To Me Records (Athens, GA) in 2007.

"Hiroshima's Revenge" was rated a 6 out of 10 by PopMatters, describing it as "packed full of jangly, ’90s-style power-pop; rough-but-catchy hooks, loose-but-able guitar work and approximately-in-tune vocals."

2007 brought changes to the lineup, with the September 27, 2007 show at the Boro Bar and Grill being the last date played with both Andy and Danial. Andy's commitments with How I Became The Bomb and Danial's commitments to family prompted the lineup changes.

Velcro Stars played the 2007 CMJ Festival in the Happy Happy Birthday To Me showcase at the Tank. The lineup featured new bass player Jonathan Brock and temporary fill-in on drums, Tyler Coppage.

In 2012 Velcro Stars released their follow-up record, "...you will never feel a thing", via Bandcamp. The link to download the album for free was posted to their Facebook page.

== Active members ==
- Shane Spresser (guitar, vocals)
- Keith Pratt (guitar, vocals)
- Rebekah Kidd (keyboards, vocals)
- Jonathan Brock (bass)
- Aaron Distler (drums)

== Previous members ==
- Paul McCaige (drums)
- Andy Spore (drums)
- Danial Norman (bass)

== Recordings ==
- Various Velma vs. Daphne Demos
- Various Velcro Stars demos
- Heart Disease / Shock and Awe Demo
- The Lost EP
- Velcro Stars 7-track Self-titled EP (2005)
- Unofficial Live @ Gentleman Jim's Bootleg DVD (2005) - circulating
- Hiroshima's Revenge (2007)
- ...you will never feel a thing (2012)
