= World Without End (album) =

Studio album by the Mighty Lemon Drops
- Released: February 1988
- Genre: Alternative rock
- Length: 46:13
- Label: Sire
- Producer: Tim Palmer

The Mighty Lemon Drops chronology
Out of Hand (1987)	World Without End (1988)	Laughter (1989)

World Without End is the second album by the Mighty Lemon Drops, released in 1988. It reached No. 34 on the UK Album Chart. The album contains the single, "Inside Out", which reached No. 74 on the UK Singles Chart.

== Production ==
The album was produced and mixed by Tim Palmer, and recorded at Rockfield Studios in Wales and Utopia Studios in London.

== Critical reception ==
Professional ratings
Review scores
Source	Rating
AllMusic	4/5 stars
The Encyclopedia of Popular Music	3/5 stars
MusicHound Rock: The Essential Album Guide	4/5 stars
New Musical Express	5/10

AllMusic wrote that the album "is one of the finest British post-punk albums of the '80s. Its parts may be borrowed, but it runs like a well-oiled machine." The Washington Post called it "galloping power-pop, tuneful and fresh," yet also, like all of the band's previous albums, overly indebted to the work of The Teardrop Explodes. Trouser Press wrote that World Without End "is a more mature, sophisticated and individualized effort, but Paul Marsh still sings as if he’s trying to impress either Ian McCulloch or Jim Morrison."

The Los Angeles Times called "Inside Out" "a perfect smart-pop single."

== Track listing ==
All songs written by David Newton and Tony Linehan.

Side one

1. "Inside Out" – 3:18
2. "One by One" – 3:30
3. "In Everything You Do" – 5:07
4. "Hear Me Call" – 4:17
5. "No Bounds" – 4:55

Side two

1. "Fall Down (Like the Rain)" – 3:52
2. "Crystal Clear" – 4:36
3. "Hollow Inside" – 4:10
4. "Closer to You" – 4:54
5. "Breaking Down" – 3:42
6. "Shine" – 3:33

== Personnel ==
- Paul Marsh – vocals
- David Newton – guitars
- Tony Linehan – bass
- Keith Rowley – percussion
