= Little D =

Studio album by Fishboy
- Released: 2005
- Recorded: 2005
- Genre: Indie pop, Indie rock
- Label: Business Deal Records

Fishboy chronology
Zipbangboom (2003)	Little D (2005)	Albatross: How We Failed to Save the Lone Star State with the Power of Rock and Roll (2007)

Little D is the fourth album by Fishboy, released by Business Deal Records. The album is a tribute to the city of Denton, Texas (from whose nickname the album gets its name), and features current and former Denton-based artists like Paul Slavens, Corn Mo, Chris Flemmons (of the Baptist Generals), and Howard Draper (formerly of Shearwater). The album cover is the Morrison's Corn-Kitts factory with altered text

The songs, which are reminiscent of They Might Be Giants, cover "feel-good" themes such as bananas, dogs, and pizza rolls.

== Track listing ==
1. Intro (for Your Answering Machine)
2. Cheer Up, Great Pumpkin
3. That's a...Jellyfish
4. Quatro
5. Our Escape
6. Banana Trees
7. Tree Star
8. Water Works
9. Asian Grain
10. Gameboy
11. A Surprise Return
12. Kichijoji
13. Start Again (A Story of Two Feuding Denton, TX Neighbors)
14. Haunted Highway- Written by Jade Jenkins, at age 11.
