= Orange Hat =

US musical group

- Origin: Gainesville, GA, United States
- Genres: Psychedelic pop, power pop
- Years active: 1983 – present
- Label: Cringe
- Members: Christo Harris; David "Zeus" Henderson; Lee Flier; Eskil Wetterqvist; Kenny Howes
- Past members: Chris Collins; Amy Henderson; John Henry; Anissa "Mickey" King; Keli Mercadante; John "Beaver" Myers; Jason NeSmith; Nathaniel Parker; Ron Pickle

Orange Hat is an American rock and psychedelic pop band from Atlanta, GA.

== History ==
=== Early years ===
Guitarist Christo Harris started Orange Hat while in high school in 1983 and was joined by guitarist/bassist David "Zeus" Henderson several years later. The pair, with constantly changing lineups, took advantage of the '80s DIY cassette culture and released a half dozen independent albums on cassette between 1985 and 1995, including Pork! and Pterodactyl Universe. (A long running inside joke demands all Orange Hat album titles begin with the letter P.) The band also released a full length independent mockumentary, Pork Rinds, in 1992.

Orange Hat took a three-year hiatus starting in 1992 following the death of drummer "Beaver" Myers. During that time, Henderson recorded and toured with Shawn Mullins.

=== 1995–2001 ===
Orange Hat reformed in 1995 and Harris and Henderson were joined by keyboardist John Henry, part-time percussionist Keli Mercadante, and drummer/record producer/audio engineer Jason NeSmith (also known as Casper, from Casper & the Cookies). With the release of the 7-inch "Humpty Dumpty / Entropy" in early 1997, the band began to receive college radio airplay and national press.

While the band's earlier work varied between new wave and tongue-in-cheek garage rock, Harris and Henderson focused their sound during this period on imagery-filled psychedelic pop, and began to incorporate appropriate effects and instruments such as the Theremin into their sound. NeSmith's contributions toward this style included the use of a Synsonics toy electronic drum pad sent through delay effects.

Keyboardist John Henry was replaced by Kenny Howes in 1997, who then contributed the distinctive sound of the Vox Continental organ to the band. John Henry remains associated with Orange Hat today, in the capacity of "psychic mentor."

The quartet released the CD Pufferfish in 1999, the single "13th Floor" in 2000, and a full-length film Psychedelic Elevator (on VHS) in 2001. This lineup of the band was as notable for its psychedelic fashion sense as for its Squeeze-like pop sound.

=== Orange Hat Hour television show ===
From 2001 to 2003, Orange Hat produced over 50 episodes of The Orange Hat Hour, a weekly, half-hour cable television show. The program featured music videos, band performances, and surreal/deconstructionist comedy, similar in style to The Monkees and SCTV.

=== Current Lineup ===
Howes and NeSmith, who both relocated, were replaced by guitarist Lee Flier and drummer Eskil Wetterqvist (both of the Atlanta band What The...?). This incarnation released the EP Ponytail in 2005. Howes returned to Atlanta in 2012 and re-joined the band.

Orange Hat continues to occasionally perform in the Atlanta area.

== Selected discography ==
=== Albums ===
- Pork! (independent, 1990)
- Pterodactyl Universe (independent, 1995)
- Pufferfish (Cringe Records, 1999)

=== EPs ===
- Paisley Thrash (independent 1989)
- Ponytail – with 3-D, Scratch and sniff cover – (Cringe Records, 2005)
- Parade Of Freaks – (Cringe Records, 2010)

=== Singles ===
- Humpty Dumpty / Entropy – 7" red vinyl single (1997)
- On The 13th Floor – CD-R – (Cringe Records, 2001)

=== Videos ===
- Pork Rinds – 70 minutes, VHS (1992)
- Psychedelic Elevator – 60 minutes, VHS (2001)
- Orange Hat Hour, Volume One – 120 minutes, DVD (2002)

=== Compilation appearances ===
- Love in Song: An Atlanta Tribute to Sir Paul McCartney – Demagogue Records – CD (2000)
