= Thee American Revolution =

Indie rock band

Thee American Revolution is an indie rock band formed in 2004 by Robert Schneider of The Apples in Stereo and Craig Morris of The Ideal Free Distribution (Morris is an indie record producer/engineer, and Schneider's brother-in-law). In addition, the band credits the creative involvement of a mysterious, older British musician known as W. Shears, who has appeared on stage with the band. It is rumored that Shears is actually William Shears Campbell, but Schneider and Morris deny this claim. Though the song "Subscriptions to Magazines" had been released on the internet, the band did not release a full-length album until 2009. On November 9, their first album, Buddha Electrostorm, was released in the United States on Garden Gate Records. The album was reissued internationally in 2011 on Fire Records (UK).

Thee American Revolution's rotating live band membership has included Otto Helmuth (drums), Bill Doss (bass), John Ferguson (bass), Marci Schneider (Mellotron) and other players close to the Elephant 6 collective.
