= Fishboy (band) =

American indie pop band

- Origin: Denton, Texas, U.S.
- Genres: indie pop / twee, indie rock, folk punk
- Years active: 2000–present
- Labels: Business Deal Records, HHBTM; Lauren Records
- Members: Eric Michener; Adam Avramescu; Grahm Robinson; Sam Escalante; Brooks Martin
- Website: Official website

Fishboy is an American four-piece indie pop band from Denton, Texas which began as the solo project of Eric Michener. He was given the nickname while on a middle-school field trip after he was dared to pluck and swallow a fish at the Dallas World Aquarium. The band has released albums with Lauren Records, Happy Happy Birthday To Me Records in Athens, Georgia and associated with Business Deal Records, a music collective in Austin, Texas.

Their second album, Little D was acclaimed by the Dallas Observer and Austin Chronicle and named to a Best Local of 2005 list by the Dallas Morning News.

The band's 2007 release, Albatross: How We Failed to Save the Lone Star State with the Power of Rock and Roll, is a record which Michener calls "a rock opera about how myself, the band, and the ghost of Buddy Holly attempt to save Texas by going on a tour/crime spree in order to perform all 8,030 of the songs I've written in my sleep since I was in the womb."

In 2011, the band released Classic Creeps, described as "the first in an ongoing series of Fishboy records featuring characters whose lives interconnect to form a bigger story." Each track is listed in alphabetical order and each character's name begins with the letter A.

in 2014, the band self-released An-Elephant, A rock opera and graphic novel about the death and after life of Topsy the Elephant as she plotted revenge against her murderer Thomas Edison and is given sage advice from Nikola Tesla. The albums release featured a website with the graphic novel formatted into small animated gifs.

May 19, 2017 the band released Art Guards on Lauren Records. The album considered a spiritual successor to Classic Creeps, features nine songs about nine different characters all grappling with their relationship to art. Similar to Creeps the characters all meet at the end of the record.

Art Guards was released with a self-published mini-graphic novel drawn by Michener.

Following the release of Art Guards the band toured with AJJ in 2017.

In 2017, Fishboy appeared on the podcast "Don't Feed the Artists" to promote their album Art Guards for Lauren Records.

On April 2, 2021, the band released Waitsgiving, the third in the series of interconnected story songs inspired by the real life forgotten time capsule of Denton, TX. The album features 10 songs about 9 characters across three generations who are all dealing with patience and celebrate a fictional holiday every May 17 called Waitsgiving.

In addition to Michener and bandmates, Waitsgiving features Matt Pence on drums and Sean Bonnette of AJJ singing backup vocals on Snocone Creator.

Following its release Michener has given a free performance of Waitsgiving on the down town Denton square every May 17.

Feb 2022, Michener released The Best Ever Boombox Cassette Tape from Durham to celebrate the 20th anniversary of The Mountain Goats album All Hail West Texas. Michener writes:

"As most Fishboy audiences are fans of this song/album we routinely get roped into small talk where we are pressed to explain that the Mountain Goats, as great as they are, have no hard connection to Denton, TX as far as I know.

One night in the car I told my bandmates that I should write a revenge song about the Goats hometown and have it haunt them in greenrooms and merch tables across the world.

This joke came in and out of my mind until I was giving a virtual interview last Spring by Riley Soloner. Again, he mentioned the song, and again I made the revenge joke but this time I felt compelled to give it a shot."

In 2023 the band toured with Koo Koo Kanga Roo and The Homeless Gospel Choir

== Band members ==
- Eric "Fishboy" Michener - Vocals, guitar
- Grahm Robinson - Drums
- Samuel Escalante - Guitar, Keys, horns
- Brooks Martin - Bass

=== Prior members ===
- Dave "Cleveland" Koen
- Adam "Sweatpants" Avramescu - Keyboard, horns, percussion
- Scarlett Wright - Bass, backup vocals
- Tommy "Medicine Ball" Garcia - Drums
- Ryan "Secret Crystal" Williams of The Baptist Generals - Bass
- Justin "Sixlets" Lloyd - Bass
- John "Christakis" Clardy of Tera Melos - Drums
- Winston Reed "Slapbracelet" Chapman of Bosque Brown and The Baptist Generals - Drums
- Brady "The Bear" Goodwin - Bass, tuba
- Drew "Albatross" Erickson of Roy G and the Biv - Drums, keys

== Discography ==
=== Albums ===
- Zipbangboom, Business Deal Records (2003)
- Little D, Business Deal Records (2005)
- Albatross: How We Failed to Save the Lone Star State with the Power of Rock and Roll, Happy Happy Birthday To Me Records (2007), Fishstick Records, (2011)
- Classic Creeps, Happy Happy Birthday To Me Records (2011)
- An Elephant, Self Released (2014)
- Art Guards, Lauren Records (2017)
- Waitsgiving, Lauren Records (2021)
- Bravest Neighbor, XLFNT (2026)

=== EPs ===
- NOM, Self Released (2009)

=== Singles ===
- Split 7" with Baby Calendar, Happy Happy Birthday To Me Records (2007)
- IMAVOLCANO 7" and comic, Lauren Records (2013)
- The Best Ever Boom Box Cassette Tape from Durham (2022)

=== Compilations ===
- I Think We Should Stay Away From Each Other, Lauren Records (2011)

=== Early recordings ===
- Tim Fly's Cause He's Having Fun, Business Deal Records (2000)
- The American Friends of Carlos Velez, Self Released (2002)
