= Sing Song (EP) =

EP by The Little Ones
- Released: October 17, 2006
- Recorded: April–November 2005
- Genre: Indie pop
- Length: 24:23
- Label: Astralwerks
- Producer: David Newton

The Little Ones chronology
Sing Song (2006)	Terry Tales and Fallen Gates (EP) (2008)

Professional ratings
Review scores
Source	Rating
AllMusic	3.5/5 stars
Pitchfork Media	7/10

Sing Song is the title of the debut EP of the American indie pop band The Little Ones.

In the United States, the EP was originally released with only six tracks, and then re-released with a bonus track on October 3, 2006.

In the United Kingdom, the EP was released as a "mini-album" on February 12, 2007, to coincide with the band's UK tour that started January 15, 2007. They supported The Boy Least Likely To, Tilly and the Wall, and The Magic Numbers. The band were first championed in the UK by Planet Sound on Teletext, who gave Sing Song a 9/10 rating in the summer of 2006.

== Track listing ==
=== Original release ===
1. "Let Them Ring the Bells"
2. "Lovers Who Uncover"
3. "Cha Cha Cha"
4. "High On a Hill"
5. "Oh, MJ!"
6. "Heavy Hearts Brigade"

=== Re-release ===
1. "Let Them Ring the Bells"
2. "Lovers Who Uncover"
3. "Cha Cha Cha"
4. "High On a Hill"
5. "Oh, MJ!"
6. "Face the Facts"
7. "Heavy Hearts Brigade"
