= Baby Calendar =

Baby Calendar is an American three-piece indie pop band from Miami, Florida who were signed to Happy Happy Birthday to Me Records in 2006.

The band has scheduled and performed hundreds of tour dates all across the United States, including spots at Plan-It-X Fest (2005, 2006), the HHBTM Athens Popfest (2006), and the CMJ Music Marathon in New York City (2006). Festival appearances and tour dates are a regular staple for the band. Since 2007, Baby Calendar has reduced the number of live performances due to extensive outside projects and as of 2008, the band members have performed as Call it Radar and under Tom Gorrio's moniker.

== Members ==
- Tom Gorrio – vocals, guitar, piano, bass, drums
- Jaquelinne Biver – vocals, bass guitar, keyboard
- Arik Dayan – drums, xylophone

== Discography ==
- Your Move, self-released, 2004
- Fifteen Year Old Sneakers, self released, 2005
- Gingerbread Dog, Happy Happy Birthday to Me Records, 2006
- "Fishboy/Baby Calendar, Split 7-inch single" (as part of the 2007 Happy Happy Birthday to Me Singles Club) Happy Happy Birthday To Me Records, 2007
- Happy Happy Birthday To Me Vol. 4 CD, contributed track: "Live Underwater", 2007
