= The Wild Flowers =

- Origin: Wolverhampton, England
- Genres: Post-punk, new wave, alternative rock, jangle pop
- Years active: 1983–1997
- Labels: Reflex, Slash
- Past members: Mark Alexander; Neal Cook; Dave Fisher; Dave Newton; David Atherton; Peter Waldron; Simon Atkins; Bill Morris; Nigel Green

The Wild Flowers were a British post-punk band, formed in 1983. They released five albums in total between 1984 and 1997.

== History ==
The band was formed in 1983 in Wolverhampton, England, consisting of members Neal Cook (guitarist/vocalist), Dave Newton (guitarist), Mark Alexander (bassist), and Dave Fisher (drummer). They released their debut album entitled The Joy of It All for the small Reflex label in 1984. Two singles were released from that album, 1983's "Melt Like Ice" and "Things Have Changed" from 1984. Newton left soon afterwards to form the Mighty Lemon Drops, and new member Dave Atherton was then brought in as guitarist. The band released two more singles, "It Ain't So Easy" in 1985 and "A Kind of Kingdom" in 1986, taken from their second album Dust, released in 1987. Choosing to concentrate on breaking in America, the Wild Flowers became the first British band signed to the punk rock label Slash Records and in 1988 released the album Sometime Soon, followed by Tales Like These in 1990. One further album followed, Backwoods, from 1997.

== Discography ==
=== Albums ===
- 1984: The Joy of It All (with Neal Cook, David Newton (guitar), David Fisher (drums), David Atherton (guitar and keyboards) and Peter Waldron (bass))
- 1987: Dust
- 1988: Sometime Soon
- 1990: Tales Like These
- 1997: Backwoods

=== Singles ===
- 1983: "Melt Like Ice"
- 1984: "Things Have Changed"
- 1985: "It Ain't so Easy"
- 1986: "A Kind of Kingdom"
- 1988: "Broken Chains"
- 1988: "Take Me for a Ride"
