= The Mighty Lemon Drops =

British band

- Also known as: Sherbet Monsters
- Origin: Wolverhampton, West Midlands, England
- Genres: Alternative rock; college rock; post-punk; indie rock
- Years active: 1985–1992, 2000
- Labels: Chrysalis, Sire
- Past members: Paul Marsh; Dave Newton; Tony Linehan; Martin Gilks; Keith Rowley; Marcus Williams

The Mighty Lemon Drops were an English rock group active from 1985 to 1992.

== Biography ==
Originally called the Sherbet Monsters, the quartet first formed in the spring of 1985 in Wolverhampton, in the Black Country. Paul Marsh, Dave Newton and Tony Linehan had played together in a band called Active Restraint in 1982, with Newton later leaving to become a founding member of the Wild Flowers. Dave Newton and Tony Linehan were the principal songwriters for the group. Their sound can best be described as a more psychedelia-influenced post-punk, played with a ringing Rickenbacker guitar as the lead instrument. They drew comparisons to Echo and the Bunnymen, who were also influenced by psychedelia.

After losing original drummer Martin Gilks (later to join the Wonder Stuff), the Drops line-up settled as Paul Marsh (vocals), David Newton (guitar), Tony Linehan (bass), and Keith Rowley (drums). In December 1985 the quartet, now officially the Mighty Lemon Drops, released their first independent single "Like an Angel", on Daniel Treacy of Television Personalities' Dreamworld Records label, which went to the top of the UK Indie Chart and sold 14,000 copies. They also recorded a session for John Peel around the same time. Becoming part of the C86 movement, which was championed by the New Musical Express, they were soon snapped up by Geoff Travis of Rough Trade for his new Blue Guitar label, a subsidiary of Chrysalis Records. They signed with Sire Records for the United States and Canada around the same period. Derek Jarman produced the video for the "Out of Hand" single in 1987, which was followed by their hit "Inside Out" in 1988. In the UK, albums Happy Head and World Without End both charted (number 58 and number 33 respectively). In the US, World Without End was a number one Modern Rock/College album in 1988 and Happy Head was one of the 50 best albums of the year 1986 according to Sounds magazine critics poll. These two albums relied heavily on Newton's use of a vintage Vox Mark VII semi-acoustic "Teardrop" 12-string electric guitar and a Micro-Frets Spacetone 6-string guitar. The band eventually parted company with Chrysalis in the UK after three albums (Happy Head, World Without End and Laughter), failing to repeat their initial independent success, but remained signed with Sire in the US, with Laughter, another US Modern Rock number one entering the lower regions of the Billboard 200 in 1990. During the sessions for Laughter, Linehan left the band and was replaced by Marcus Williams.

The band released two more albums, Sound ... Say Goodbye to Your Standards and Ricochet before finally breaking up in 1992. Three more albums followed (live albums All the Way and Young, Gifted & Black Country and the greatest-hits package Rollercoaster) and at the end of 2000 the band played a one-off comeback gig in Wolverhampton. In 2007, the band were reported to have been offered the chance to reform at the Coachella Festival.

Dave Newton still works as a recording engineer and record producer, and has completed projects for the Little Ones, the Blood Arm, the Soft Pack, the Henry Clay People, Everybody Was in the French Resistance...Now!, the Sweater Girls, Torches, and the Movies. In 2006, he produced a cover version of "Inside Out" (as well as playing bass guitar on the track) for the Lassie Foundation's double album, Through and Through.

In 2011, Newton produced the third album by the Blood Arm, Turn and Face Me.

All of the Mighty Lemon Drops albums are now officially available again through Wounded Bird Records, licensed through Warner Bros., all with extra tracks, B-sides and liner notes.

In March 2014, the band released Uptight: The Early Recordings 1985–1986, on Cherry Red Records.

== Members ==
- Paul Marsh – vocals, rhythm guitar (1985–1992)
- Dave Newton – guitars (1985–1992)
- Tony Linehan – bass guitar (1985–1989)
- Martin Gilks – drums (1985)
- Keith Rowley – drums (1985–1992)
- Marcus Williams – bass guitar (1989–1992)

== Discography ==
=== Studio albums ===
- Happy Head (1986) – UK number 58
- World Without End (1988) – UK number 34
- Laughter (1989) – US number 195
- Sound ... Goodbye to Your Standards (1991)
- Ricochet (1992)

=== Live albums ===
- All the Way (Live in Cincinnati) (1993)
- Young, Gifted & Black Country (2004)

=== Compilation albums ===
- Rollercoaster: The Best of the Mighty Lemon Drops (1997)
- Uptight the Early Recordings 1985/1986 (2014)

=== Singles and EPs ===
- "Like an Angel" (1985)
- "The Other Side of You" (1986) – UK number 67
- "My Biggest Thrill" (1986)
- Out of Hand EP (1987)
- "Out of Hand" (1987) – UK number 66
- "Inside Out" (1988) – UK number 74
- "Fall Down (Like the Rain)" (1988) – UK number 89
- "Into the Heart of Love" (1989) - UK number 76
- "Where Do We Go from Heaven" (1989)
- "Beautiful Shame" (1989)
- "Too High" (Remix) (1991)
- "Unkind" (Remix) (1991)
