= Ideal Free Distribution =

American indie rock band

The Ideal Free Distribution (IFD) were an indie rock band formed in Benton, Kentucky in 1997 and based in both Benton and Lexington, Kentucky. Heavily influenced by 1960s pop music and promoted by Robert Schneider, the band is indirectly associated with Elephant 6 Recording Company groups such as The Minders, Neutral Milk Hotel, The Olivia Tremor Control, and The Apples in Stereo.

== Formation ==
Guitarist Craig Morris and bass player Eric Griffy were next-door neighbors growing up and lead singer Tony Miller lived about two miles away. Griffy played a few of his four-track recordings on the way to the store one day and Miller claimed that “it was the best music Craig and I had ever heard.” This led Miller and Morris to fully engross themselves in songwriting. Morris wrote “the most brilliant two pop songs ever,” according to Miller, which led to an unofficial competition between the three friends.

The group began recording at Griffy's parents home in 1997 using a Marantz cassette four-track and a Shure SM-57. Initially they looked to the early Who and Stone Roses for inspiration and as time went on they began adding more “elaborate overdubs to add depth to sound”. Finding a permanent drummer proved to be a challenge for the band after going through six. This, along with the fact that some of the group members had moved and now lived four hours apart, made live performances difficult. They were few and far between, occurring only when the group had a track appearing on a Lexington compilation.

== Release of first album ==
IDF's self-titled debut album was released by Happy Happy Birthday To Me Records in 2007. It combines a “variety of psychedelia, folk, and 60s British pop” and draws inspiration from a myriad of groups including The Zombies, The Beatles, The Who, Love, and The Moody Blues.

== Collaboration with Robert Schneider ==
Robert Schneider, founder of The Apples in Stereo and The Elephant 6 Recording Company, discovered the band when he began dating Morris's sister Marci Morris (the two subsequently married). He heard a recording of one of the group's older songs “Kodak Stare” that Marci had in her music collection. After he “gushed about that song”, Morris presented him with a copy of the album which resulted in “his barrage of promotional cheerleading, and our signing to HHBTM (Happy Happy Birthday To Me), and the mixing of our album,” according to Miller. Morris credits Schneider with teaching him how to use compression and EQ and “a long list of invaluable information”.

== Departure of Morris, Second Album, and Further Projects ==
Craig Morris left the band in early 2008. He formed the indie rock band Thee American Revolution alongside Robert Schneider in 2004. Their debut album Buddha Electrostorm was released by Garden Gate Records in 2009. The album was rereleased by Fire Records in 2011. He also went on to form psychedelic Americana band Terrapin Pond, whose debut album Hello All Stations was also released by Garden Gate Records in 2010. The remaining members of the band released a second album titled When We Were Older in 2008. It was released by Color Wheel Records.

== Members ==
=== Main ===
- Eric Griffy (Bass, Electric Guitar, Percussion)
- Tony Miller (Vocals, Percussion)
- Craig Morris (Guitar, Vocals, Drums, Percussion, Mellotron, Organ, Piano, Synthesizer)

=== Additional Members ===
- Shelley Morris (Vocals, Percussion)
- Joe Drury (Guitar)
- Mike Grote (Drums)
- Marci Schneider (Mellotron, Castanets)
- Samantha Herald (Percussion, Vocals)
