= Hautewerk =

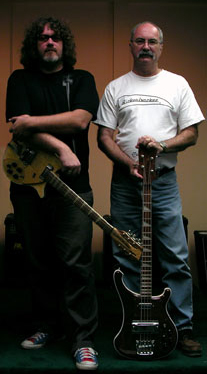
- Hautewerk: Kenny Howes and John Hall (L-R)

Background information
- Origin: Orange County, California, United States
- Genres: Rock
- Years active: 2003–present
- Label: RIC Media
- Members: John Hall; Jason Feddy; Bob Hawkins; Ray Weston; Kenny Howes; Tom Ricci
- Past members: Dougie MacFaux; Matthew Hill; Michael Simmons; Paul Brown; Chris Bradley; Steve Anderson
- Website: http://www.hautewerk.com

Hautewerk is a rock group based out of Orange County, California, composed of Kenny Howes and John Hall.

== History ==
Kenny Howes and John Hall first met in the summer of 2000, but it was not until Howes' relocation to Orange County, California in 2003 that the two began to occasionally collaborate on studio recordings. The two set their sights on film/television scoring, experimenting with ambient and synth pop, but little by little their work found a halfway point between those styles and Howes' prior power pop work.

Along with occasional collaborator Matthew Hill, Howes and Hall began to piece together what would become their debut CD, Stop Start Again, which was released on the independent RIC Media label (a division of Rickenbacker International Corporation) in 2006. The group celebrated their CD release at the House of Blues in Hollywood, California on August 25 of that year, as part of Rickenbacker's 75th Anniversary Event. For this performance, the lineup was Howes, Hall, Matthew Hill and Michael Simmons of sparklejets*uk.

The performing version of the group features Howes on guitar and lead vocals, Hall on bass guitar and vocals, Steve Anderson on guitar and vocals, Chris Bradley on keyboards and vocals, and Paul Brown on drums.

In April 2009, Harmonix announced the release of three Hautewerk recordings for their highly successful Rock Band video game.

== Discography ==
- Stop Start Again (CD) – RIC Media (2006)
