= Morning Tide =

Studio album by The Little Ones
- Released: 28 July 2008 (UK); 7 October 2008 (US)
- Genre: Indie pop
- Label: Heavenly

The Little Ones chronology
Terry Tales and Fallen Gates (2008)	Morning Tide (2008)	The Dawn Sang Along (2013)

Professional ratings
Aggregate scores
Source	Rating
Metacritic	60/100
Review scores
Source	Rating
AllMusic	2.5/5 stars
The Guardian	3/5 stars
This Is Fake DIY	8/10 stars

Morning Tide is the debut full-length album by the American band The Little Ones. It was released on July 28, 2008 on CD, digital download and 7" vinyl.

== Track listings ==
1. "Morning Tide" 4:03
2. "Ordinary Song" 3:37
3. "Boracay" 3:31
4. "All Your Modern Boxes" 3:04
5. "Tangerine Visions" 3:00
6. "Gregory's Chant" 3:15
7. "Everybody's Up to Something" 4:41
8. "Waltz" 3:20
9. "Rise & Shine" 3:15
10. "Like a Spoke On a Wheel" 3:59
11. "Farm Song" 5:46
