= The Hush Now =

American indie rock band

- Origin: Boston, Massachusetts, United States
- Genres: Indie pop
- Years active: 2006–present
- Members: Noel Kelly; Barry Marino; John Millar; Adam Quane; Pat MacDonald
- Past members: Mike DiMinno; Kurt Schneider; Mike Wittrien

The Hush Now is an American indie rock quintet from Boston, Massachusetts.

The band has been described as "audio candy for the art school crowd". They performed at CMJ 2010.

== Discography ==
=== Albums ===
- Sparkle Drive (2014)
- Memos (2011)
- Constellations (2010)
- The Hush Now (2008)

=== EPs ===
- Shiver Me Starships (2010)
