= Glenn Tilbrook: One for the Road =

- Directed by: Amy Pickard
- Starring: Glenn Tilbrook
- Release date: 2004

Glenn Tilbrook: One for the Road is a 2004 documentary directed by Amy Pickard which follows a 2001 solo American tour by Glenn Tilbrook, lead singer of British new wave group Squeeze.

The film, which was self-financed by Pickard after she sold all her possessions, shows Tilbrook attempting to mount a month-long US tour using a mobile home instead of a tour bus and hotels. The film centres on Tilbrook's apparent good humour in the face of a series of calamities - including vehicle breakdown - and his unusual stagecraft. At one stage he takes his entire audience into a car park and in another sequence performs in a fan's apartment.

The film features performance excerpts from a number of Squeeze and Tilbrook songs including: "Tempted", "Hourglass", "Take Me I'm Yours", "Up the Junction", "Goodbye Girl", "Some Fantastic Place" and "By The Light of the Cash Machine".

The film premiered in 2004 at London's Raindance festival and has since been released on DVD.
