= The Blood Arm =

American rock band

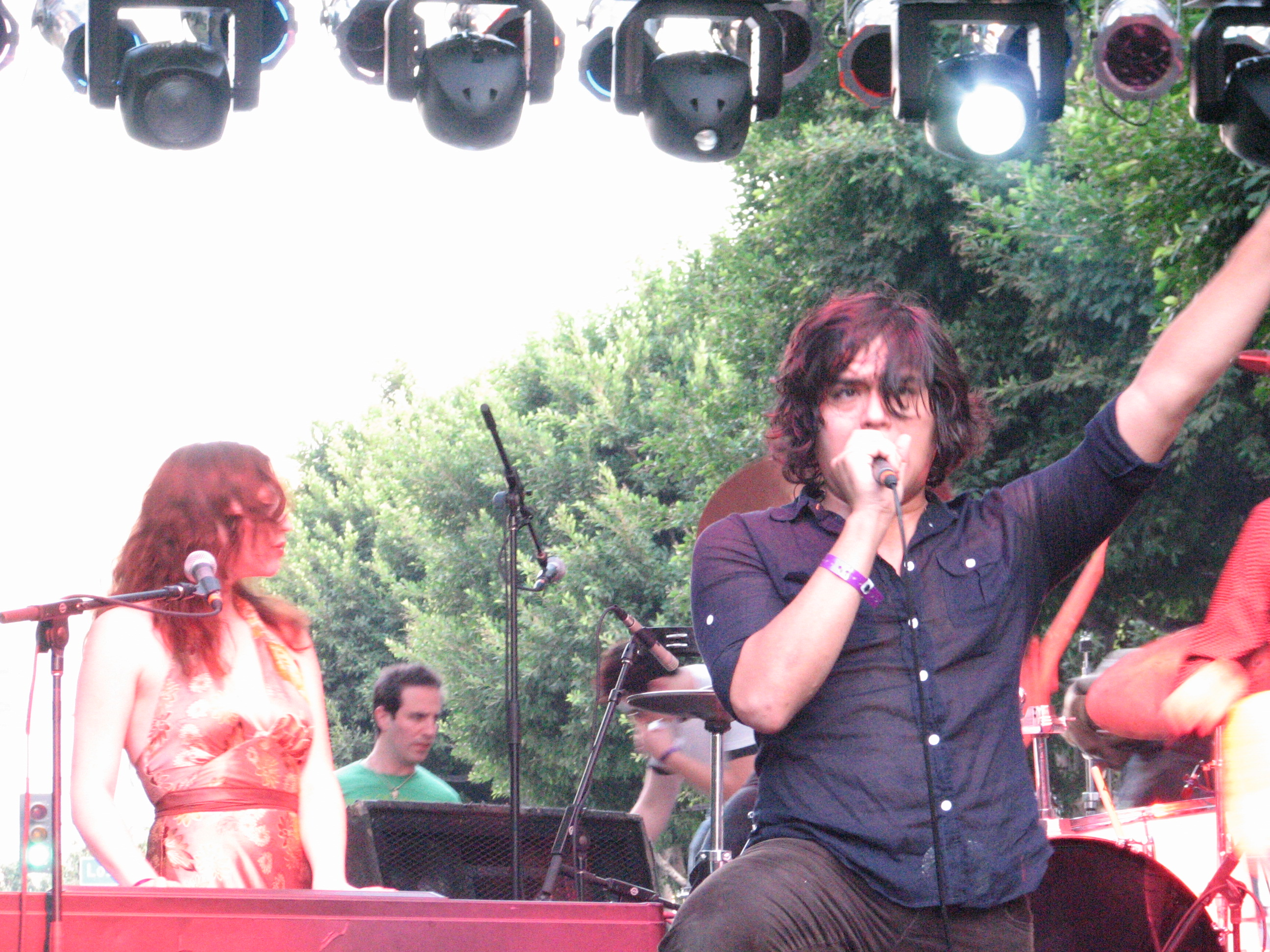

Background information
- Origin: Los Angeles, California, U.S.
- Genre: Rock
- Years active: 2002–present
- Labels: City Rockers, Because Music, Pau! Records, Snowhite (DE), RIP Ben Lee Records, Duchess Box Records
- Members: Nathaniel Fregoso; Dyan Valdés; Zebastian Carlisle; Ferdinand Kumpfmüller; Sebastian Völkers
- Past members: Zachary Amos
- Website: thebloodarm.com

The Blood Arm are an American five-piece rock band from Los Angeles, California, currently residing in Berlin, Germany. At present, they have released five albums. Their music has been likened to "James Brown fronting Talking Heads and singing Fall songs" by the NME and they are renowned for their extremely energetic live performances.

The Blood Arm's music has been featured in the television programs Gossip Girl, The OC, Nip/Tuck, Chuck, Ravenswood and the US version of Shameless, the video game series "MLB: The Show", as well as the hit movie Cloverfield and the 2006 documentary Radiant City.

== History ==
=== Formation ===
The Blood Arm were formed in LA in 2002. The band is led by singer Nathaniel Fregoso (born November 29, 1979), who has a reputation for highly energetic live shows, including singing from the tops of speaker stacks, hanging off water pipes, waltzing with members of the audience, or stealing off to the bar to swipe drinks. Fregoso met guitarist Zebastian Carlisle at a karaoke bar in Koreatown and keyboardist / co-vocalist Dyan Valdés at UCLA, which they both attended.

=== Early years and Bomb Romantics (2002–2005) ===
The founding members of the band performed around Los Angeles as a three-piece until drummer Zachary Amos joined the band in 2003. They self-released the EP Four Song Demo in 2004 and their debut album Bomb Romantics in 2005, generating buzz overseas with positive reviews. The album quickly sold out and remains out of print.

On 19 March 2004, the band played an after show party for Franz Ferdinand, who had just performed at LA's Troubadour. Singer Alex Kapranos quickly began naming the Blood Arm as his favorite new band. The band were interviewed by Franz Ferdinand in the 8 January 2005 issue of the NME.

The Blood Arm were nominated for the LA Weekly Music Award for Best New Artist in 2004. The Blood Arm used to travel with a Master of Ceremonies named Ben Lee Handler, who warmed up the crowd with semi-fictional accounts of how the band arrived at the venue. They won the Best Live Act award at the 2005 South By Southwest Music Conference.

=== Lie Lover Lie (2005–2009) ===
The 2005 single "Do I Have Your Attention?" on Loog Records was a UK radio hit, and the "Say Yes" single released later that year on UK's City Rockers charted in the country's top fifty. Shortly afterward, the Blood Arm signed to the record label City Rockers/Because and released their second album Lie Lover Lie in October 2006. It received many positive reviews with The Guardian giving it 5/5, NME giving it 8/10, and Artrocker calling it "the best debut album of the year."

The breakout single "Suspicious Character (I Like All the Girls and All the Girls Like Me)" quickly became an indie disco hit. The band also recorded a bilingual French and English version of "Do I Have Your Attention?" with French pop star Anaïs. The collaboration was a hit in France and led to performances on the French music television show Taratata.

The band's record label City Rockers folded after the release, leaving the band unable to follow up the release of Lie Lover Lie in time to capitalize on its momentum. According to Fregoso, "we were left in this weird middle space. It's incredibly confusing being on offshoots of major labels."

=== All My Love Songs and Turn and Face Me (2009–2011) ===
In 2010, the band released the EP All My Love Songs on Snowhite Records. Their third full-length album Turn and Face Me was released by Snowhite Records on 4 July 2011.

Turn and Face Me received generally positive reviews. In their 8/10 review, Punk Rock ist nicht tot described the album as "bubbly, infectious, inventive pop" and "fun with a capital 'F'." Q Magazine called Turn and Face Me "playfully knowing indie rock that could almost be a collision between The Scots and The Boomtown Rats", though the album also drew comparisons with Roxy Music, Kevin Rowland and the Doors.

The band promoted the album with a lengthy European tour, beginning and eventually culminating in Germany. The promotional tour included an appearance on Berlin Live on ZDF (a popular music show from Berlin) alongside Art Brut and dEUS.

=== Berlin ===
2011 also saw Fregoso and Valdés relocate to Berlin, Germany, followed a year later by Carlisle. According to Fregoso, the move was inspired by a desire for reinvention. Berlin's storied musical history also played a huge role: says Fregoso, "I wanted to understand why so much great music had come out of Germany and I wanted The Blood Arm to be a part of that tradition."

Drummer Amos did not make the move with them and they were temporarily joined by ex-Rumble Strips drummer Matthew Wheeler.

The band currently reside together in a shared flat in Berlin's Prenzlauer Berg district which they refer to as "HQ".

Fregoso and Valdés spent their first winter in Berlin penning the songs that would become the band's fourth studio album, Infinite Nights. The pair performed the new songs acoustically on a free "tour" of Berlin's U8 U-Bahn line, stopping at each station to perform a different song.

=== Infinite Nights (2011–2014) ===
Infinite Nights was recorded in a studio in Berlin's seedy Neukölln neighborhood and released on RIP Ben Lee Records on 17 June 2013, and "shows a different shade to the band with half the songs being quieter, more introspective, and reflective" according to The Vinyl District which named the Blood Arm the UK Artist of the Week. The album's more mature and introspective sound garnered praise from the music press, with Q Magazine likening Fregoso and Valdés to a "modern-day Lou Reed and Moe Tucker" on the melancholy ballad "Torture", proclaiming that the move to Berlin "has done them good: this is the sound of the real Blood Arm stepping up to the mic."

The Blood Arm were selected to participate in a citywide musical project called Lokalhymnen Berlin, in which Berlin-based bands were asked to write an original song about the city. The resulting track and video, "The Invitation", was released on the Lokalhymnen CD and DVD compilation on 13 December 2013.

=== Kick 'Em in the Sunglasses (2014–present) ===
In 2014, the band was joined by drummer Sebastian Völkers and bassist Ferdinand Kumpfmüller, who together form the music production company Mimic.

With the new line-up, the Blood Arm recorded their fifth studio album Kick 'Em in the Sunglasses in their own Berlin-based studio. The album was released in February 2016 on Duchess Box Records.

== Solo projects ==
Valdés co-founded the group Everybody Was in the French Resistance...Now! with singer Eddie Argos of Art Brut, in which the pair wrote responses to popular songs. The album Fixin' the Charts, Vol. 1, for which she composed all of the music and played the majority of instruments, was released in 2010 on Cooking Vinyl and supported by a worldwide tour. She is also currently the touring keyboard player for the seminal German indie band Die Sterne.

Fregoso released a solo album under the moniker Thee Nathaniel Fregoso & the Bountiful Hearts on Duchess Box Records in 2014. Lead single "Transatlantic Panic Attack" was a radio hit on rock station Flux FM in Berlin.

== Discography ==
=== Albums ===
- Bomb Romantics (2004)
- Lie Lover Lie (2006)
- Turn and Face Me (2011)
- Infinite Nights (2013)
- Kick 'Em in the Sunglasses (2016)

=== EPs ===
- 4 Song Demo (2004)
- All My Love Songs (2010)

=== Singles ===
- "Do I Have Your Attention?" (2005)
- "Say Yes" (2005)
- "Suspicious Character" (2006) – UK No. 62
- "Angela" (2007)
- "Do I Have Your Attention?" (with French singer Anaïs) (2007)
- "She's a Guillotine" (2011)
- "Relentless Love" (2011)
- "Midnight Moan" (2013)
- "Matters of the Heart" (2013)

== Interviews ==
- The Scenestar – December 2006
- Splendid Berlin — 2014
