= Happy Happy Birthday to Me Records =

American independent record label

- Founded: 1999
- Founder: Mike Turner
- Genre: Indie pop; Indie rock; Hip hop
- Country of origin: U.S.
- Location: Athens, Georgia
- Official website: http://hhbtm.com

Happy Happy Birthday to Me Records is an American independent record label based in Athens, Georgia. Its catalogue features indie rock, indie pop and hip-hop music, with several of its artists associated with or influenced by The Elephant 6 Recording Company.

== History ==
The label began as a compilation album, Happy Happy Birthday to Me Volume 1, before it expanded into a 7-inch singles club, which released records by Of Montreal, Marshmallow Coast, the Essex Green, Great Lakes, and Masters of the Hemisphere, while also releasing several tape and CD compilations. The singles club was noted for its individuality, with each individual record by an artist often being different. For example, each copy of The Essex Green's single came with a different original photograph on the sleeve, while Marshmallow Coast's were hand-drawn by school children. The label then began to release full-length CDs for the first time, the first of these being Birddog's A Sweet and Bitter Fancy. The label also continued to release 7-inch singles, compilations and T-shirts, as well as a video compilation DVD, and a further singles club featuring Bunnygrunt, Casper and the Cookies, and Andy from Denver. There are currently over nearly 200 releases on the label, and an even larger catalog of distributed titles. Today, its catalog has expanded to span several genres.

Happy Happy Birthday to Me Records founder Mike Turner also founded the annual Athens Popfest, which routinely featured many of the bands on the label's roster, as well as many Elephant 6 artists, other Athens luminaries, and national artists. 2005's Popfest was headlined by bands including Pylon, Circulatory System and Of Montreal. The 2006 Popfest featured headliners Deerhoof, the Apples in Stereo, the Mountain Goats and Circulatory System. The 2007 Popfest lineup included Daniel Johnston (backed by Athens band Casper and the Cookies) and Ted Leo. Athens Popfest 2007 is most remembered as the breakout performance for Jacksonville band Black Kids, resulting in a storm of blogs, interviews, and international magazine write-ups. Popfest 2008 was headlined by Roky Erickson, Elf Power and, in a rare and much-anticipated performance, the Music Tapes. 2010 included Mission of Burma, the Wedding Present, and the Apples in Stereo. 2011 featured Throwing Muses, Bob Mould, Oh-OK, the Olivia Tremor Control, Man or Astro-man?, and the Dead Milkmen. The festival's return in 2016 featured Deerhoof, Love Tractor, Ought, Shopping, and Elf Power. Popfest 2017 was headlined by the Apples in Stereo, ESG, Lætitia Sadier, and Superchunk. The 2018 event was headlined by the Mummies, Man or Astro-man?, Ex Hex, Dean Wareham, His Name Is Alive, and Guided by Voices.

== Roster ==
=== Active ===
- Cowtown
- Eureka California
- The Flatmates
- Fred Schneider & the Superions
- His Name Is Alive
- Joe Jack Talcum
- Katie Lass
- Linqua Franqa
- Magnapop
- Marshmallow Coast
- Noon:30
- Rat Fancy
- Skinny Girl Diet
- The Primitives
- The Wedding Present
- Tullycraft
- Wesdaruler

=== Inactive ===
- Keith John Adams
- Afternoon Naps
- Antlered Aunt Lord
- AqPop
- Ashley Park
- Ryan Anderson
- Baby Calendar
- Bam! Bam!
- Bastards of Fate
- Bearsuit
- Birddog
- Boyracer
- Bunnygrunt
- Calvin, Don't Jump!
- Cars Can Be Blue
- Casper & the Cookies
- Elekibass
- The Ethical Debating Society
- Eux Autres
- Fablefactory
- Fishboy
- Flash to Bang Time
- Flink
- Forever
- The Gwens
- The High Water Marks
- Hotpants Romance
- Hug Abuse
- The Ideal Free Distribution
- Joanna Gruesome
- Kingsauce
- The Loch Ness Mouse
- Lolligags
- The Love Letter Band
- The Lovely Eggs
- Try the Pie
- Muuy Bien
- Neutral Milk Hotel
- Oh Ok
- Orca Team
- Patience Please
- Red Pony Clock
- Russian Spy Camera
- The 63 Crayons
- Sarandon
- The Smittens
- Smokedog
- Sourpatch
- Starbag
- Suggested Friends
- Sweater Girls
- Titans of Filth
- Tunabunny
- Velcro Stars
- Visitations
- Witching Waves

== See also ==
- List of record labels
