= The Little Ones (band) =

American rock band

- Origin: Los Angeles, California, United States (US)
- Genres: Indie pop, Indie rock
- Years active: 2006–present
- Labels: Chop Shop, Heavenly, Branches Recording Collective
- Members: Edward Nolan Reyes - Guitar, Vocals; Brian Reyes - Bass, Keys, Vocals; Ian Moreno - Guitar, Percussion; Lee LaDouceur - Keys, Bass, Vocals; Kevin Lenhart -Drums; Ryan Wilson - Multi-Instrumentalist
- Past members: Gregory Meyer - Drums Percussion Vocals
- Website: http://wearethelittleones.com

The Little Ones was an indie pop band based in Los Angeles, California. The music of the band, which features tambourines and handclaps, has garnered comparisons to 1960s pop bands such as The Beach Boys, The Zombies, The Kinks, modern-day pop group The Shins, and the Elephant Six collective.

== History ==
Before Ed Reyes and Ian Moreno formed The Little Ones, they were members of an indie rock band called Sunday's Best. Reyes explained in an interview for the South by Southwest (SXSW) arts festival that "We're always the underdogs. We're not hired guns; we're all friends and that keeps us dynamic. We're always having fun!" The following is taken from the "Biography" section of The Little Ones Facebook fan page:

Our friend Moses tells us about The Little Ones' journey out of the land of White Noise...The Little Ones finally left the land of White Noise and set sail to bring good cheer to others everywhere. Uncle Lee's Rule of Feet proved to be too infectious and the boys wanted to spread the word to everyone across the land. They crisscrossed many roads to find that there were others who wanted to experience 'The Rule'. The Little Ones gave it all they got. Some were against it; some were for it. In the end, The Little Ones discovered that everyone possessed their own 'Rule of Feet'. They discovered that 'The Rule' appeared in many flavors, shapes, and sizes. Their 'Rule' became ordinary. They journeyed along the pacific coast and found a stretch of shore draped in black sand. There they set up camp and walked across its unique seascape. With every step, the grain embraced their toes and the shore welcomed them as it pushed and pulled. The water drew close; sand, water, and feet became one. A touch of mid day sun broke from the sky and they found a rhythm from the morning tide. So delighted, they started assembling new songs that would encapsulate their recent findings.

The band was initially signed to Astralwerks Records and released one EP on that label, entitled Sing Song. In 2006, Matt Costa invited the band to open for him at the Bowery Ballroom in New York City, US, and the band experienced a subsequent increase in popularity. Shortly after releasing a new single, "Ordinary Song", early in 2008, the Littles Ones lost its recording contract and were forced to postpone the release of its debut album. Instead, an EP, entitled Terry Tales & Fallen Gates, was released on Branches Recording Collective, a label created by the band.

On July 28, 2008, The Little Ones released its debut full-length album, Morning Tide, on Heavenly Recordings, a United Kingdom (UK) record label—this was preceded by the release of a single of the same name in the week previous. The Morning Tide album was met with less-than-favorable reviews, and received a 60 out of 100 from Metacritic.

The band released two singles as free downloads "Argonauts" and "Forro" on November 6, 2012 and January 21, 2013, respectively; the releases were promoted on both the band's website and Facebook fan page. "Argonauts" is the first single release from the band's second album The Dawn Sang Along and an album launch was held on February 8, 2013 at the Echo venue in Los Angeles, California, U.S.

A music video for "Argonauts", directed by Lee LaDouceur and edited by Derek Lieu, was published on the Internet on February 1, 2013. The song appears in a 2013 Citibank advertisement for one of the corporation's apps.

== Style ==
A review of the Little Ones' style was published in the UK's Guardian newspaper, with the journalist stating that "The Little Ones are capable of freakishly infectious guitar pop. Elsewhere, they sound like twee US indie kids doing karaoke versions of Magic Numbers tunes". Following the release of the band's second album, bassist Brian Reyes revealed, "We love pop, the way 60s songs were crafted: there's a hook, vocal layerings, harmonies."

== Touring ==
The Little Ones supported popular British rock act, Kaiser Chiefs, on a UK arena tour, together with We Are Scientists, during late 2007.

The band appeared at the SXSW arts festival, held annually in Austin, Texas, US, in both 2008 and 2013. Following the 2008 performance, the British music publication NME published an article entitled "The Little Ones encourage 'smoking the ganja' at SXSW" after it was reported that Ed Reyes has stated to the audience, "I smell ganja and we encourage that. Light them up." In 2013, the band played two sets: A "Deli Radio Showcase" and a "SXSW Official Showcase".

== Recognition ==
Seattle, Washington, US radio station, KEXP, a member of the NPR media organization, featured "Oh, MJ!" as its "song of the day" on November 28, 2006 and the band played the song live on KEXP prior to October 2007. Kevin Cole, writing for KEXP, then selected the Sing Song EP in a list of the eleven best debut albums of 2006. Cole described the band and the EP in the following manner: "This L.A. band makes its debut with a charming, sunny indie-pop EP, which combines pulsing rhythms with strong melodies in ways that recall Clap Your Hands Say Yeah, but with less of an obvious Talking Heads influence and a bit more Shins-style jangle."

In 2005, NPR's John Richards featured the song "Lovers Who Uncover" as its "song of the day", explaining that it "skillfully combines handclaps with fists-in-the-air chanting". Richards further stated, "If there's ever a textbook on writing foot-tapping, hand-clapping pop songs, these guys should write the introduction."

== Media appearances ==
- Live performance on KEXP on July 29, 2006.
- Appeared as the "Super Music Friends Show Musical Guest" on the Nickelodeon children's show, Yo Gabba Gabba! (episode "Dress-Up", aired on October 16, 2009)—the band played a song entitled "Let's Dress Up".

== Discography ==
=== Studio albums ===
- Morning Tide (UK release date: July 28, 2008)
- The Dawn Sang Along (US release date: February 8, 2013)

=== EPs ===
- Sing Song, EP (UK release date: February 12, 2007)
- Terry Tales and Fallen Gates EP (April 2008)

=== Singles ===
- "Lovers Who Uncover" (Nov 13, 2006 UK - EMI) 7", limited edition of 1000, featuring "Lovers Who Uncover" and "Cha Cha Cha".
- "Lovers Who Uncover/Oh, MJ!" (remixes) (Feb 12, 2007 UK - Heavenly) 12" Promo featuring the title tracks and remixes by Stereolab, Zongamin, and Crystal Castles.
- "Oh, MJ!" (Jan 29, 2007 UK - Heavenly) CD, featuring "Oh, MJ!" and "High On A Hill", UK Singles Chart No. 100 (physical sales only - No. 29).
- "Lovers Who Uncover" (May 28, 2007) - re-release UK Singles Chart No. 133 (9/6/2007)
- "Ordinary Song" (Jan 21, 2008 UK - Heavenly) CD and 2 X 7", featuring "Boracay" and "A-O (There's A Sun)" UK Singles Chart No. 98 (27/1/08)
- "Morning Tide" (July 21, 2008- Heavenly)- Digital Download and 7" also featuring "I Don't Want To Dance"
- "Argonauts (November 6, 2012)
- "Forro" (January 21, 2013)
