= Casper & the Cookies =

American rock and pop band

- Origin: Athens, Georgia, U.S.
- Genres: Rock, power pop, new wave
- Years active: 1998–present
- Labels: Wild Kindness, Happy Happy Birthday to Me, People in a Position to Know, Waikiki (Japan)
- Members: Jason NeSmith; Kay Stanton; Davy Gibbs; AJ Griffin
- Past members: Christo Harris; Ben Spraker; Kenny Howes; Phil Stockman; Paul Walker; Tim Schreiber; Suzanne Allison; Bryan Poole (a.k.a. The Late BP Helium); Peter Alvanos; Jason Gonzales; Joe Rowe; Jim Hicks; Gregory Sanders
- Website: casperandthecookies.com

Casper & the Cookies is an American rock and pop band from Athens, Georgia, United States.

== History ==
Multi-instrumentalist and singer Jason NeSmith (pronounced "KNEE-smith," no relation to Michael Nesmith of the Monkees), began using the pseudonym Casper Fandango in 1996 as a moniker for his solo four-track recordings. NeSmith was given the name by fellow Atlanta musician David Dault while playing together in the band Feyerabend.

Casper Fandango released two DIY cassettes in the late 1990s, originally as Casper Fandango & the Knees and subsequently Casper Fandango & His Tiny Sick Tears.

The Cookies came into existence in 1998 as NeSmith's live band. They have three CDs released on Happy Happy Birthday to Me Records, Oh! (2004), The Optimist's Club (2006), and Modern Silence (2009). After many lineup changes the band consists of NeSmith, Kay Stanton, Davy Gibbs, and AJ Griffin.

NeSmith was a member of Of Montreal for the Satanic Panic in the Attic tour of 2004 and some of the Sunlandic Twins tour of 2005, eventually leaving to focus on his own band. (Kay and Jason are also in Supercluster, the side project of Vanessa Briscoe Hay of Pylon.) NeSmith has also been a member of Kenny Howes & the Yeah!, Orange Hat, the Visitations, the Late BP Helium and the Sunshine Fix. He also owns and operates a commercial recording facility, Bel*Air Studio.

Casper & the Cookies served as the backing band for Daniel Johnston at the 2007 Athens Pop Fest. Also in 2007, the Cookies went on a nationwide tour supporting the Apples in Stereo.

== Members ==
Current

- Jason NeSmith (a.k.a. Casper Fandango)
- Kay Stanton
- Davy Gibbs
- AJ Griffin

Former

- Christo Harris
- Ben Spraker
- Kenny Howes
- Phil Stockman
- Paul Walker
- Tim Schreiber
- Suzanne Allison
- Bryan Poole (a.k.a. the Late BP Helium)
- Peter Alvanos
- Jason Gonzales
- Gregory Sanders
- Joe Rowe
- Lucas Jensen
- Jim Hicks

== Discography ==
=== Albums ===
- Consumer (cassette; as Casper Fandango & the Knees) – Lookit Meee! – 1996
- How's Your Hand? (cassette; as Casper Fandango & His Tiny Sick Tears) – Lookit Meee! – 1997
- How's Your Hand? (CD; as Casper Fandango & His Tiny Sick Tears) Lookit Meee! / AAJ – 2000
- Oh! (CD) – Happy Happy Birthday to Me Records [HHBTM] / Waikiki Record – 2004/ 2005 (Japan)
- The Optimist's Club – (CD/LP) – HHBTM / People in a Position to Know {PIAPTK] – 2006 and Waikiki Record – 2008
- Modern Silence – (CD/LP) – HHBTM / People in a Position to Know {PIAPTK] – 2009
- Volatile and Erogenous: The Best of Casper & The Cookies – (CD) HHBTM / People In A Position to Know – 2011 (The album was given away for free on the Facebook page of the band and custom made by drummer Gregory Sanders)
- Ice Mattress – (digital only release) – Self-Released – 2011
- Dingbats – (LP/CD/cassette) – Wild Kindness Records – 2014

=== Singles and EPs ===
- The Band That Shouted Love at the Heart of the World (CD-r) – Lookit Meee! – 2004
- Overly Optimistic (CD-r) – HHBTM – 2006
- 3 ½ Stars (CD-r) – HHBTM – 2007
- "Power Stupid" (split with Keith John Adams) 8” – PIAPTK – 2007
- "Jennifer’s House" / “Huff” (split with Marbles) 7” – HHBTM – 2007
- "Kiss Me Beneath the Christmas Tree" (digital only) – HHBTM – 2007
- "Wolf Of White Columns" - 2020
