= David Newton (guitarist) =

British guitarist

David Newton is a British guitarist, songwriter and record producer, best known as a member of the band the Mighty Lemon Drops.

== Guitarist ==
Newton has been a member of Active Restraint (1981–1983), the Wild Flowers (1983–1984), the Mighty Lemon Drops (1985–1993), Blue Aeroplanes (1992–1993), Starfish (1993–1994), Revolux (1995–1997), Fonda (1998–2003), Straight to Video (2001–2003), Twinstar (2003–2006), the C86 All Stars (2006–2007), Bilston United (2006–present), the Joshua Dreamz (2008) and most recently David Newton and Thee Mighty Angels (2009–present).

Newton still occasionally performs with his own bands, the C86 All Stars, Bilston United and most recently David Newton and Thee Mighty Angels.

== Producer ==
In the late 1990s, Newton moved from Wolverhampton, England to Southern California, U.S. in January 1995 (via five years in Putney, London), where he co-formed the short-lived band Revolux with former Seven Simons honcho and the The guitarist Keith Joyner. Newton built his own personal recording studio, Rollercoaster Recording.

Newton has produced or engineered records by the Little Ones, the Happy Hollows, Everybody Was in the French Resistance...Now!, Kissing Tigers, the Soft Pack, the Movies, the Henry Clay People, the Blood Arm, Death to Anders, You Me & Iowa, Wait Think Fast, the Lassie Foundation, Twinstar, Graham MacRae, Red Lightning – Alain Whyte (Morrissey), Big Stone City, the Hush Now, Star Parts, One Silver Astronaut, Slow Car Crash, the Transmissions and the Golden Years. Newton produced the Little Ones' debut EP, Sing Song, as well as material from the Blood Arm and Rat Fancy.

Newton has done occasional work as a composer for television, film and music libraries, and has had work and compositions featured on Gilmore Girls, The Osbournes, Buffy the Vampire Slayer, and The Bill, amongst others.

== Discography ==
Solo

- Paint the Town EP (November 2011)
