= Kelly Pratt (musician) =

American arranger and multi-instrumentalist

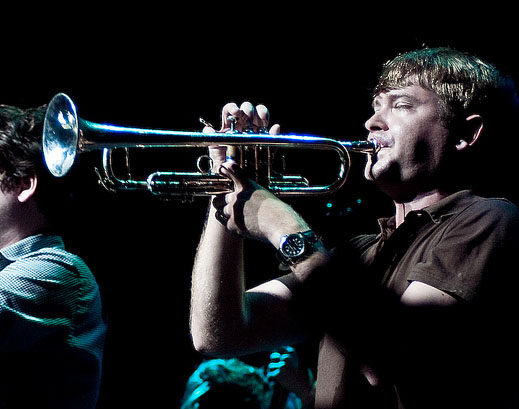
- Kelly Pratt playing with Beirut, France, 2009

Background information
- Born: Lexington, Kentucky; United States
- Genres: Indie rock; world music
- Occupation: Musician
- Instruments: Trumpet; flugelhorn; euphonium; French horn; flute
- Years active: 2006–present

Kelly Pratt is an arranger and multi-instrumentalist best known for his brass and woodwind work in the music acts Beirut, Arcade Fire, David Byrne & St. Vincent and Father John Misty.

== Biography ==
Born in Lexington, Kentucky, Pratt was a member of Beirut from the band's inception in 2006 until 2012, playing in the live band and on the recordings. He joined Montreal's Arcade Fire on their Neon Bible world tour in 2007–2008, playing trumpet, flugelhorn, euphonium, French horn and flute. Pratt has also been an arranger and musical director for David Byrne & St. Vincent, leading the brass section for the tour promoting their album Love This Giant. He is currently arranger and conductor for Father John Misty.

In addition to the previous bands he has performed and/or recorded with Coldplay, LCD Soundsystem, Passion Pit, James Iha, The Decemberists, The War on Drugs, The Antlers, Lonnie Holley, and Anthony Braxton, amongst others.

Pratt is the singer and chief songwriter of Bright Moments, a Brooklyn-based indie rock band. Their debut album Natives was released February 21, 2012, on Luaka Bop.

== Selected discography ==
Year	Artist	Album
2006	Beirut	The Lon Gisland EP
2007	Beirut	The Flying Club Cup
2007	Herman Dune	Giant
2008	Coldplay	Viva la Vida or Death and All His Friends
2008	Coldplay	Prospekt's March
2008	Herman Dune	Next Year in Zion
2009	Team B	Team B
2009	Arcade Fire	Miroir Noir
2009	The Maccabees	Wall of Arms
2009	A Camp	Colonia
2009	Émilie Simon	The Big Machine
2009	The Harlem Shakes	Technicolor Health
2009	Beirut	March of the Zapotec
2011	Beirut	The Rip Tide
2011	Various	Red Hot + Rio 2
2011	Alexi Murdoch	Towards the Sun
2011	Emilie Simon	Franky Knight
2012	Bright Moments	Natives
2012	Passion Pit	Gossamer
2012	David Byrne & St. Vincent	Love This Giant
2012	James Iha	Look to the Sky
2012	LCD Soundsystem	Shut Up and Play the Hits
2013	Bonobo	The North Borders
2013	David Byrne & St. Vincent	Brass Tactics
2014	The Pains of Being Pure at Heart	Days of Abandon
2014	LCD Soundsystem	The Long Goodbye: LCD Soundsystem Live at Madison Square Garden
2015	The Antlers	In London
2015	Laura Stevenson	Cocksure
2017	Los Campesinos!	Sick Scenes
2017	The Pains of Being Pure at Heart	The Echo of Pleasure
2018	Laura Gibson	Goners
2020	Father John Misty	Off Key in Hamburg
2020	Father John Misty	To S./To R.
2021	Flyte	This is Really Going to Hurt
2021	The Antlers	Green to Gold
2021	Bob's Burgers	The Bob's Burgers Music Album
2021	Margo Cilker	Pohorylle
2021	Beirut	Fisher Island Sound
2022	Superchunk	Wild Loneliness
2022	Bob's Burgers	The Bob's Burgers Movie: A Major Motion Burger Soundtrack
2022	Father John Misty	Chloë and the Next 20th Century
2023	Lonnie Holley	Oh Me Oh My
2023	M. Ward	Supernatural Thing
2023	Margo Cilker	Valley of Heart's Delight
2023	Louise Post	Sleepwalker
2024	Guster	Ooh La La
2024	The Decemberists	As It Ever Was, So It Will Be Again
2024	Futurebirds	Easy Company
2024	Dhruv	Private Blizzard
