= Artifacts (Beirut album) =

Compilation album by Beirut
- Released: January 28, 2022
- Studio: Various
- Genres: Indie rock, indie folk
- Length: 86:34
- Label: Pompeii

Beirut chronology
Gallipoli (2019)	Artifacts (2022)	Hadsel (2023)

Singles from Artifacts
- 1. "Fisher Island Sound" Released: October 20, 2021; 2. "So Slowly" Released: November 17, 2021; 3. "Fyodor Dormant" Released: January 6, 2022

Professional ratings
Review scores
Source	Rating
The A.V. Club	B+
Buzz	4/5 stars
The Line of Best Fit	8/10
Loud and Quiet	7/10
Under the Radar	5.5/10

Artifacts is a compilation album by American indie rock band Beirut. It was released digitally on January 28, 2022, through Pompeii Records, and was released on vinyl and CD on April 1, 2022. The double album includes unreleased tracks, B-sides, some of Zach Condon's earliest recordings at age 14, and a re-release of the band's 2007 Lon Gisland EP, as well as the Elephant Gun (EP) and Pompeii (EP) EPs.

It was announced on October 20, 2021, with the release of the previously unreleased track "Fisher Island Sound". The second single, "So Slowly", was released on November 17, 2021, followed by the single "Fyodor Dormant" on January 6, 2022.

== Track listing ==
Artifacts track listing
No.	Title	Length
1.	"Elephant Gun"	5:45
2.	"My Family's Role in the World Revolution"	2:07
3.	"Scenic World"	2:51
4.	"The Long Island Sound"	1:20
5.	"Carousels"	4:02
6.	"Transatlantique"	3:35
7.	"O Leãozinho"	3:20
8.	"Autumn Tall Tales"	3:35
9.	"Fyodor Dormant"	2:46
10.	"Poisoning Claude"	3:01
11.	"Bercy"	5:01
12.	"Your Sails"	1:37
13.	"Irrlichter"	4:07
14.	"Sicily"	3:29
15.	"Now I'm Gone"	4:25
16.	"Napoleon On the Bellerophon"	3:36
17.	"Interior of a Dutch House"	4:05
18.	"Fountains and Tramways"	3:50
19.	"Hot Air Balloon"	3:06
20.	"Fisher Island Sound"	2:44
21.	"So Slowly"	3:00
22.	"Die Treue zum Ursprung"	4:32
23.	"The Crossing"	2:00
24.	"Zagora"	4:03
25.	"La Phare Du Cap Bon"	2:58
26.	"Babylon"	1:39
Total length:		86:34

== Charts ==
Chart performance for Artifacts
Chart (2022)	Peak position
Austrian Albums (Ö3 Austria)	71
Belgian Albums (Ultratop Flanders)	90
German Albums (Offizielle Top 100)	69
UK Independent Albums (Official Charts)	27
