= Léon Gimpel =

French photographer (1873–1948)

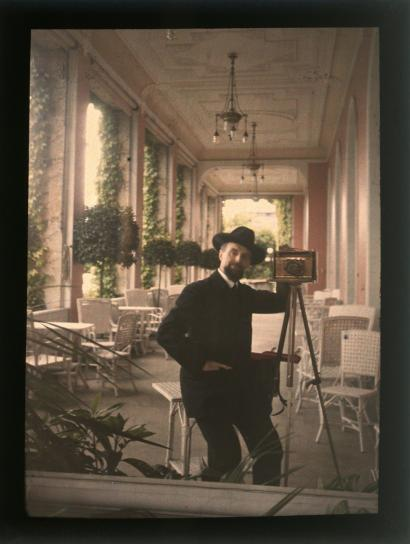
- Self-portrait, 1920
- Born: 13 May 1873; Strasbourg, France
- Died: 7 October 1948 (aged 75); Sévignacq-Meyracq, France
- Known for: First photographer to have color images published
- Notable work: The Grenata Street Army
- Spouse: Marguerite Bouillon

Léon Gimpel (French: [le.ɔ̃ ʒɛ̃pɛl]; 13 May 1873 – 7 October 1948) was a French photographer.

Born in Strasbourg in 1873, he was the youngest son of four, born to a Jewish Alsacian family who fled to Paris after Germany took over Alsace in 1870. Gimpel worked for his family's fabric company, managed by his older brother Eugene. In 1897 his interest in photography was kindled when he acquired a Kodak detective camera, he soon swapped this for a Spido Gaumont which allowed him greater creative freedom. By 1900 he was working prodigiously, documenting the 1900 World's Fair in Paris. By 1904 his work was being published regularly in the magazines La Vie au Grand Air, La Vie Illustrée and L'Illustration.

A restless and innovative photographer, Gimpel experimented with perspective, produced self-portraits using distorting mirrors and experimented with night time photography. At an air show at Béthény in August 1909, Gimpel ascended in an air ballon to photograph the crowds below, pioneering aerial photography. However it is his pioneering work in colour photography that he is most notable for. In 1904, Gimpel met Auguste and Louis Lumière, who had just displayed their invention the autochrome to the Académie des Sciences. Limited by the long exposure time required, Gimpel used the process, to photograph still lifes and landscapes. Assisted by his colleague Fernand Monpillard, Gimpel modified the plates to produce "instant" colour pictures. Thanks to his works Gimpel was the only photographer who succeeded in capturing, in colour, scenes of everyday life during la Belle Époque.

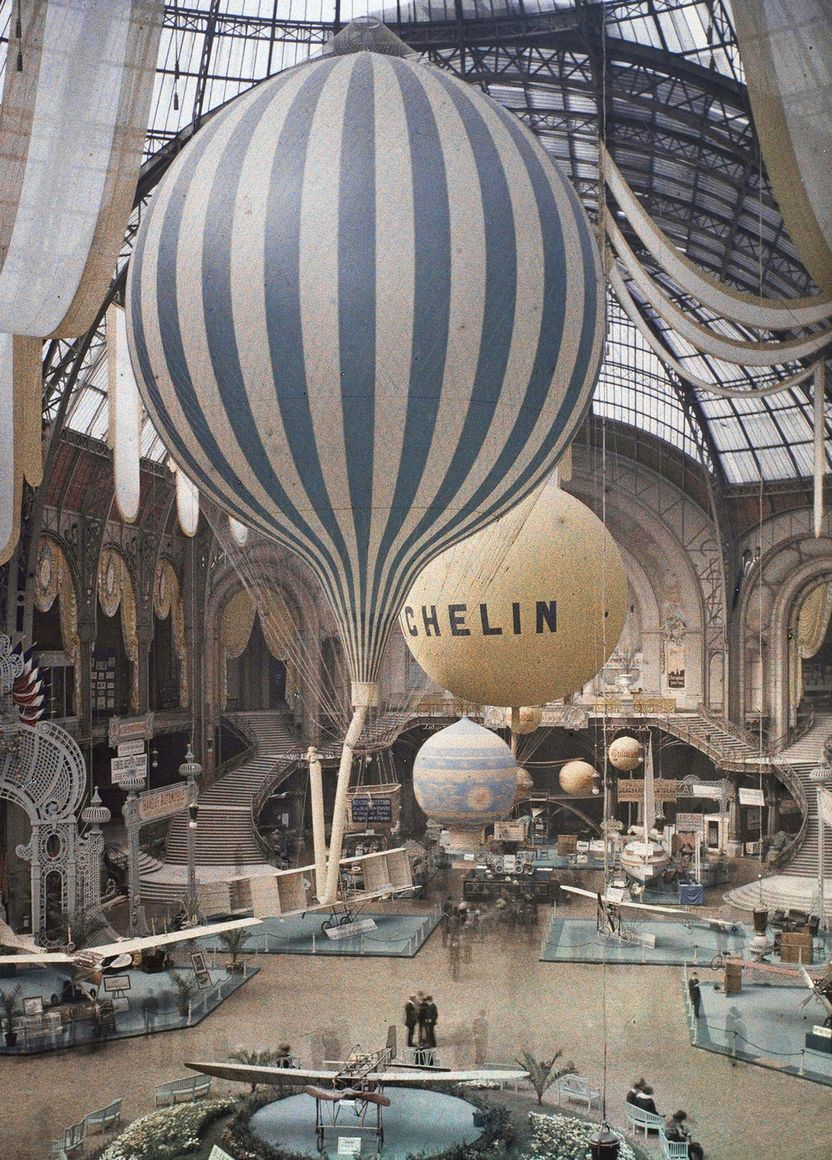
Aeronautical exhibition at the Grand Palais, Paris, in 1909, photographed by Gimpel

On 10 June 1907 Gimpel was the first photographer to have images published in color. A special edition of L'Illustration was published to demonstrate the new technology, it included an insert featuring four autochromes taken by Gimpel, a group of soldiers, two scenic views of Villefranche-sur-Mer and sunset at Lake Geneva. A few weeks later on 29 June 1907, Gimpel published the first color news photographs when L'Illustration published his picture of Frederik VIII of Denmark and his wife Louise of Sweden, who were visiting France at the time. Gimpel produced many works using the autochrome, arguably the most famous are the images known as The Grenata Street Army produced during the First World War. Gimpel befriended a group of children from the Grenata Street neighbourhood of Paris who had established their own 'army'. Under his guidance he helped them build their tanks and aircraft, documenting their 'battles' against the 'boche'. On a more serious note Gimpel also recorded the French experience of the First World War visiting munitions factories and trenches on the Western Front.

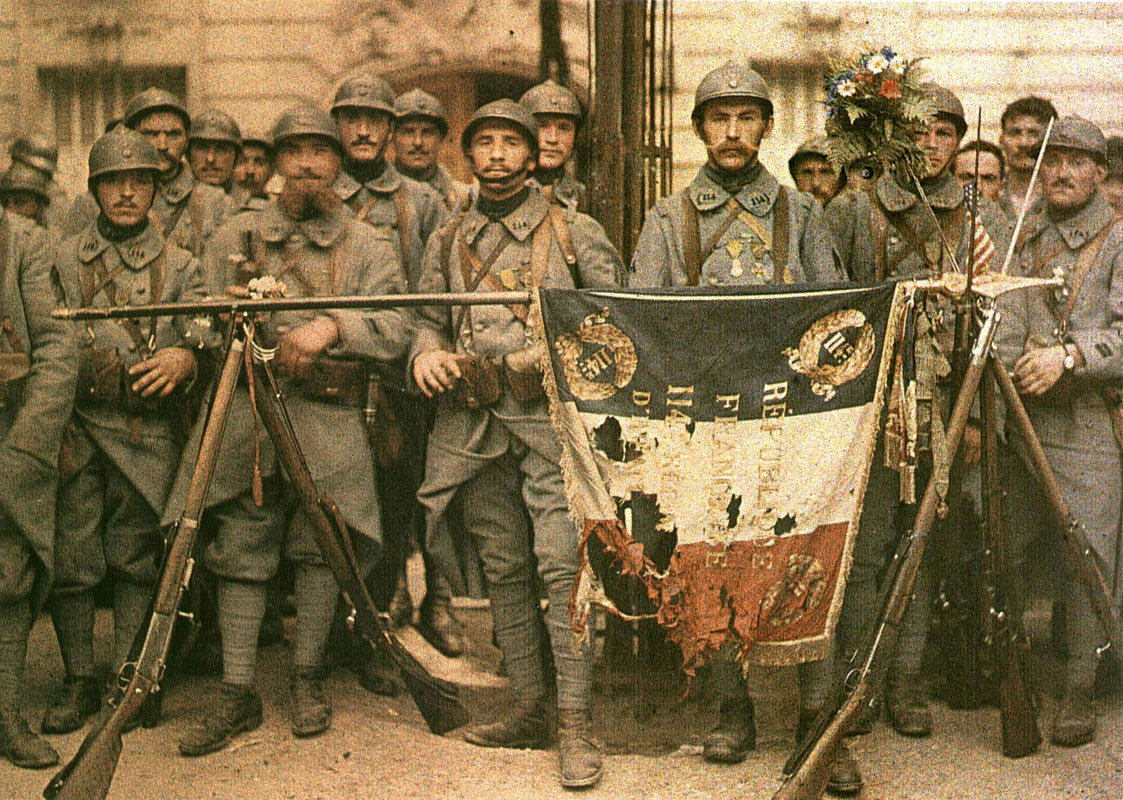
The 114th Infantry in Paris on July 14, 1917

Gimpel married Marguerite Bouillon in 1939 and settled in Béarn. He died in 1948 at Sévignacq-Meyracq.

Although largely forgotten, his work has experienced a revival recently. The band Beirut used one of his photographs as the inspiration behind their 2007 album The Flying Club Cup. A major respective took place at Musée d'Orsay in Paris in February 2008. His work helped influence the 2009 Spike Jonze film Where the Wild Things Are.

== See also ==
- Sergey Prokudin-Gorsky, contemporary Russian colour photographer and inventor
