= As Needed =

As Needed may refer to:

- As Needed (film), 2018 Italian film
- As Needed, a song by Beirut from the album No No No
