= East Harlem (song) =

Single by Beirut

from the album The Rip Tide
- B-side: "Goshen"
- Released: June 3, 2011
- Genre: Indie pop; Balkan folk
- Length: 3:58
- Label: Pompeii
- Songwriter: Zach Condon

"East Harlem" is a song by indie folk band Beirut, from the band's third studio album The Rip Tide. The song was digitally released as a single on June 3, 2011 with "Goshen" as its B-side. The single was physically released on June 6, 2011 with limited copies and released on June 14, 2011 on Pompeii on blue, white, and red vinyl with a supply of 2,000 copies of each color.

== Critical reception ==
"East Harlem" received positive reviews from most music critics. The song was chosen upon release as Pitchfork's "Best New Track". Marc Hogan stated that, "East Harlem looks poised to undergo a similar sort of ripening as it becomes more and more familiar. The lyrics are sparse and rooted in classic, instantly communicative tropes: "Another rose wilts in East Harlem," Condon croons, as he wastes no words in vividly describing an intra-Manhattan relationship that feels like it's separated by "a thousand miles" (have you tried getting from downtown to East Harlem lately?)." Hogan continues by saying, "the stately backing is what we've come to expect from Beirut, with swaying accordion, rich brass, lively piano, and trebly strums, all in all more like a 2010 Williamsburg performance. By the time Condon switches things up, repeating, "Oh, the sound will bring me home again," over wordless backing vocals, he might as well be describing the warm, cozy but still distinctive feeling "East Harlem" has achieved."

== Track listing ==
All tracks are written by Zach Condon.

No.	Title	Length
1.	"East Harlem"	3:58
2.	"Goshen"	3:20
Total length:		7:18

- "East Harlem" recorded at Old Soul Studios, Catskill, New York
- "Goshen" recorded at Vacation Island Recording, Brooklyn, New York

== Personnel ==
"East Harlem"

- Zach Condon – trumpet, ukulele, hammond organ, vocals, brass arrangement
- Perrin Cloutier – piano, pump organ
- Ben Lanz – trombone, brass arrangement
- Nick Petree – percussion
- Paul Collins – bass
- Kelly Pratt – trumpet, brass arrangement

"Goshen"

- Zach Condon – piano, trumpet, vocals
- Perrin Cloutier – cello
- Nick Petree – percussion
- Ben Lanz – trombone
- Kelly Pratt – trumpet
