= Holiday (Alaska in Winter album) =

Studio album by Alaska in Winter
- Released: November 18, 2008
- Genre: Electronica
- Length: 43:51
- Label: Milan Records (US) / Regular Beat Recording Co. (EU)
- Producer: Brandon Bethancourt

Alaska in Winter chronology
Dance Party in the Balkans (2006)	Holiday (2008)	Space Eagle (the motion picture soundtrack) (2010)

Professional ratings
Review scores
Source	Rating
Allmusic	3.5/5 stars
Pitchfork Media	7.8/10

Holiday is the second full-length release studio album from electronic group, Alaska in Winter.

== Track listing ==
1. "We Are Blind and Riding the Merry-Go-Round" – 4:33
2. "Berlin" – 6:11
3. "Speed Boat to Heaven" – 5:07
4. "Highlander Pt. 1" – 3:56
5. "Highlander Pt. 2" – 3:31
6. "Knorrpromenade" – 4:09
7. "Streetgang Pt. 1" – 3:21
8. "Streetgang Pt. 2" – 2:52
9. "Streetgang Pt. 3" – 2:41
10. "Keep Your Boots Clean and Everything You Step on Is Dirt" – 3:56
11. "Close Your Eyes (Remix)" – 5:24
12. "Horsey Horse Pt 2" (Bonus track on European release) – 3:13

== Personnel ==
- Brandon Bethancourt - Vocals, Keyboards
