= Elephant gun (disambiguation) =

An elephant gun is a large calibre gun for hunting elephants and other large game.

Elephant gun may also refer to :

- Elephant Gun (film), the US title of the 1958 British film "Nor the Moon by Night"
- Elephant Gun (EP), a 2007 extended-play record by US indie band Beirut
- "Elephant Gun", a song from David Lee Roth's 1986 album Eat 'Em and Smile
- Boys anti-tank rifle, sometimes referred to as the "elephant gun"
- Lahti L-39 Finnish anti-tank rifle, nicknamed Norsupyssy (“elephant gun”)
