= When I Die =

When I Die may refer to:

- "When I Die" (Motherlode song), 1969
- "When I Die" (The Real Milli Vanilli song), 1991, later covered by No Mercy
- "Texas (When I Die)", a song by Tanya Tucker, 1978
- "When I Die", a song by Alma, 2019
- "When I Die", a song by Beirut from Gallipoli, 2019
- "When I Die", a song by New Found Glory from Coming Home, 2006
- "When I Die", a song by the Waifs from Sink or Swim, 2000
- "When I Die", a song by Groove Coverage from 21st Century, 2006

== See also ==
- "And When I Die", a song by Blood, Sweat and Tears, 1969
