= Hadsel (album) =

Studio album by Beirut
- Released: November 10, 2023
- Length: 47:36
- Label: Pompeii
- Producer: Zach Condon

Beirut chronology
Artifacts (2022)	Hadsel (2023)	A Study of Losses (2025)

Singles from Hadsel
- 1. "So Many Plans" Released: August 30, 2023

Hadsel is the sixth studio album by indie folk band Beirut, released on November 10, 2023, through Pompeii Records, the band's own label. Frontman Zach Condon wrote and produced the majority of the album himself. The album was announced alongside the release of the lead single "So Many Plans". It received positive reviews from critics.

== Background ==
The album is named for Hadsel Municipality in Norway, where Zach Condon traveled after canceling part of the band's 2019 tour in support of their previous album, Gallipoli, when he developed laryngitis. He rented a cabin and was permitted to use the Hadsel Church's (depicted on the cover) organ, which is when he formulated the album. Condon stated that "the few hours of light would expose the unfathomable beauty of the mountains and the fjords, and the hours-long twilights would fill me with subdued excitement. I'd like to believe that scenery is somehow present in the music."

== Critical reception ==
Professional ratings
Aggregate scores
Source	Rating
AnyDecentMusic?	7.7/10
Metacritic	82/100
Review scores
Source	Rating
Mojo	4/5 stars
Pitchfork	7.2/10
The Skinny	3/5 stars
Uncut	8/10

Hadsel received a score of 82 out of 100 on review aggregator Metacritic based on nine critics' reviews, indicating "universal acclaim". Uncut stated that the album "sounds both ethereal and earthly", and Mojo found that as Condon sings "'It's not too late to find where you are,' [...] on The Tern", the album "seems to tremble on the brink of that revelation". Lewis Wade, reviewing the album for The Skinny, felt that the "songs are delivered with Condon's typically layered touch, his voice as yearning and ephemeral as usual. There are some new ideas, along with the aforementioned organ [...] but the palette will be dependably comfortable to long-time fans, and these songs fit snugly alongside previous material". Glide Magazine's Ryan Dillon stated that "for 12 mind-altering tracks that lean on gentle ambiance to deliver warm tones and soaring melodies, Condon brings you to the moment right before the underdog gets the victory for an emotional rollercoaster of a comeback LP". Ben Cardew of Pitchfork remarked that "the note of surprise on Hadsel [...] is not so much that Zach Condon has recorded an album on a remote Norwegian island with free access to a church organ, it's that he hasn't done so before", calling it "a new beginning for Beirut that sounds like old times, a record born of despair and solitude that still feels full of life".

== Track listing ==
All tracks are written by Zachary F. Condon.

Hadsel track listing
No.	Title	Length
1.	"Hadsel"	4:54
2.	"Arctic Forest"	3:55
3.	"Baion"	4:06
4.	"So Many Plans"	3:47
5.	"Melbu"	2:20
6.	"Stokmarknes"	4:10
7.	"Island Life"	4:08
8.	"Spillhaugen"	3:41
9.	"January 18th"	3:41
10.	"Süddeutsches Ton-Bild-Studio"	5:22
11.	"The Tern"	4:14
12.	"Regulatory"	3:18
Total length:		47:36

== Personnel ==
- Zach Condon – mixing, recording (all tracks); percussion (tracks 1–4, 6–12), trumpet (1–4, 6, 7, 9, 12), modular synthesizer (1, 2, 4, 6, 7, 10), French horn (1, 3, 4, 7, 9), church organ (1, 9, 11), pump organ (2–5, 7, 10, 12), glockenspiel (2, 3, 7, 10), Moog Voyager (2, 8, 9, 11, 12), baritone ukulele (3, 4, 7, 8, 10, 12), Rhythm Ace drum machine (3, 8, 11), piano (3, 12); tenor ukulele, electric organ (3); continuo organ, tape delay, accordion (6); Roland RS-505 (8, 11), Roland Jupiter (9); bells, field recording (10); Auto-Orchestra drum machine (12)
- Francesco Donadello – mastering
- Craig Silvey – mixing
- Lina Gaisser – artwork, photography, design

== Charts ==
Chart performance for Hadsel
Chart (2023)	Peak position
Austrian Albums (Ö3 Austria)	40
Belgian Albums (Ultratop Flanders)	121
German Albums (Offizielle Top 100)	68
Scottish Albums (Official Charts)	71
UK Album Downloads (Official Charts)	55
UK Independent Albums (Official Charts)	20
