= Sergey Chilikov =

Russian photographer (1953–2020)

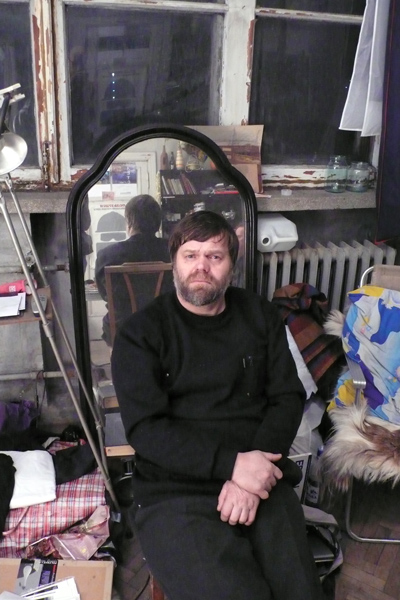

Sergey Chilikov (Russian: Сергей Геннадьевич Чиликов) (born 1953 in Kilemary, Mari ASSR; died 21 June 2020, Yoshkar-Ola, Republic of Mari El) was a Russian photographer.

Chilikov graduated from the philosophical faculty with a Ph.D. Until 1991, he had been teaching in the universities of Yoshkar-Ola. In 1993, he published his first book on analytical philosophy titled “Artseg. The Owner of a Thing or Ontology of Subjectiveness”.

Chilikov started as a photographer in 1976 in the creative group “The Fact” (Chilikov, Mikhailov, Evlampiev, Likhosherst, Voetskiy). From 1980 to 1989, he ran “Analytical exhibitions of Photography” and the annual open-air photography festival on Kundysh river. In 1988, Chilikov took part in the retrospective exhibitions of the “Fact” Group in Moscow titled “On the Kashirka”. Since 1989, he photographed the journey through former Soviet Union cities and towns.

He exhibited his photographic essays “Photo Provocations”, “The Countryside Glam”, “The Beach”, “The Gambling”, “The Philosophy of a Journey” and others at “Fashion and Style in Photography” and “Photobiennale” in Moscow, and "Les Rencontres d'Arles" in France (2002).

Chilikov lived in Yoshkar-Ola and in Moscow.

He died on 21 June 2020.

== Gulag Orkestar album art ==
A Chilikov photograph was used without his approval on the front and back of indie folk band Beirut's 2006 album Gulag Orkestar. According to Zach Condon, singer-songwriter of Beirut, the photographs were found in a book, torn out, in a library in Leipzig, Germany.

== Exhibitions ==
- Provincia russa, Musei Capitolini - Centrale Montemartini, Rome, Italy, 2003
- La province russe, Fnac Saint-Lazare, Paris, France, 2003
- Old Samara, Moscow House of Photography, Moscow, Russia 2004
- The Beach, Moscow House of Photography, Moscow, Russia, 2004
- La province russe dans les années 90', Galeries des magasins Fnac, Gent, Belgium, 2004
- Gamble, XL Gallery, Moscow, Russia, 2005
- Selected Works 1978-, Third Floor Gallery, Cardiff, Wales, 2011
