= Next Year in Zion =

Studio album by Herman Düne
- Released: September 9, 2008
- Recorded: VEGA studios, Provence, France
- Genre: Indie pop
- Length: 47:02
- Label: Source Etc.
- Producer: Herman Düne

Herman Düne chronology
Giant (2006)	Next Year in Zion (2008)	Strange Moosic (2011)

Professional ratings
Review scores
Source	Rating
Pitchfork Media	(5.9/10) link

Next Year in Zion is a 2008 studio album by Herman Düne. Lead singer and songwriter David-Ivar Herman Düne states "It's the first album that I write while I am happy. I used to think I needed to be a little sad, or at least melancholic to write, this one proved me wrong."

== Track listing ==
All songs written by David-Ivar Herman Düne, except where noted.

1. "My Home Is Nowhere Without You" – 4:11
2. "Try to Think About Me (Don't You Worry a Bit)" – 4:04
3. "When the Sun Rose Up This Morning" – 5:06
4. "When We Were Still Friends" – 2:39
5. "On a Saturday" – 3:59
6. "My Baby Is Afraid of Sharks" – 4:32
7. "Lovers Are Waterproof" – 4:52
8. "Next Year In Zion" – 3:00
9. "Someone Knows Better Than Me" – 4:17
10. "My Best Kiss" – 3:46
11. "Baby Baby You're My Baby" – 2:10
12. "(Nothing Left But) Poison In the Rain" – 4:26

== Personnel ==
- David-Ivar Herman Düne – guitar, vocals<
- Néman Herman Düne – drums
- Dave Tattersall (of The Wave Pictures) – guitar
- The Babyskins – backing vocals
- The Jon Natchez Bourbon Horn Players (on loan from Beirut)
