= The Flying Club Cup =

Studio album by Beirut
- Released: October 9, 2007
- Genres: Balkan folk; indie folk; baroque pop
- Length: 38:35
- Labels: Ba Da Bing; 4AD

Beirut chronology
Elephant Gun (2007)	The Flying Club Cup (2007)	March of the Zapotec/Holland EP (2009)

Professional ratings
Aggregate scores
Source	Rating
Metacritic	80/100
Review scores
Source	Rating
AllMusic	4/5 stars
The A.V. Club	B+
Blender	3.5/5 stars
The Guardian	4/5 stars
Mojo	4/5 stars
Pitchfork	8.0/10
Q	4/5 stars
Rolling Stone	2.5/5 stars
Spin	3.5/5 stars
Uncut	4/5 stars

The Flying Club Cup is the second studio album by Balkan folk-influenced indie folk band Beirut, released on October 9, 2007 on 4AD Records. The album was released on iTunes on September 4, 2007.

The album features string arrangements by Arcade Fire contributor Owen Pallett, also known by his former stage name Final Fantasy.

== Background ==
Zach Condon said about the name and inspiration for the album: "Back in the early 1900s...there used to be this hot air balloon festival in Paris—[the album's] titled after that and after this very bizarre 1910 photo I found [by Léon Gimpel]. It's one of the first color photos ever made, at the World's Fair, and it...shows all these ancient hot air balloons about to take off in the middle of Paris. I just thought it was the most surreal image I'd seen in a long time." He also said about the album sound: "I was listening to a lot of Jacques Brel and French chanson music—pop songs shrouded in big, glorious, over-the-top arrangements and all this drama—and that was in some sense unfamiliar territory to me. So I started buying new instruments and relying on things I wasn't necessarily comfortable with, like French horns and euphoniums, carrying these big, epic big brass parts that I used to do all on trumpets, and working with accordion and organ instead of all ukulele—very much throwing myself in the world of classical pop music, I guess you could say."

According to the program notes given out during Beirut's performance at The Society for Ethical Culture in New York on September 24, 2007, each song on the album is intended to evoke a different French city (although Guaymas, Sonora is a Mexican city).

The album's second track, Nantes, was sampled on the 2012 10 Day mixtape from American rapper Chance the Rapper.

== Track listing ==
All tracks are written by Zach Condon, except where noted.

No.	Title	Writer(s)	Length
1.	"A Call to Arms"		0:18
2.	"Nantes"		3:50
3.	"A Sunday Smile"		3:35
4.	"Guyamas Sonora"		3:31
5.	"La Banlieue"		1:57
6.	"Cliquot"	Zach Condon; Owen Pallett	3:51
7.	"The Penalty"		2:22
8.	"Forks and Knives (La Fête)"		3:33
9.	"In the Mausoleum"		3:10
10.	"Un Dernier Verre (Pour la Route)"	Condon; Kendrick Strauch	2:51
11.	"Cherbourg"		3:33
12.	"St. Apollonia"		2:58
13.	"The Flying Club Cup"		3:05
Total length:			38:35

== Artwork ==
The cover photograph was taken in Brittany, France during the 1930s. It shows the Trestraou beach in the city of Perros-Guirec.

== Videos ==
The whole album has been shot by La Blogothèque in Brooklyn. Each track filmed as a Take Away Show, available on the site of the album.

== Charts ==
=== Weekly charts ===
Chart (2007–2008)	Peak position
Belgian Albums (Ultratop Flanders)	3
Belgian Albums (Ultratop Wallonia)	65
Dutch Albums (Album Top 100)	54
French Albums (SNEP)	64
Irish Albums (IRMA)	51
Swiss Albums (Schweizer Hitparade)	94
UK Albums (Official Charts)	69
US Billboard 200	118
US Independent Albums (Billboard)	9
US Indie Store Album Sales (Billboard)	6

=== Year-end charts ===
Chart (2008)	Position
Belgian Albums (Ultratop Flanders)	14

== Certifications ==
Region	Certification	Certified units/sales
Belgium (BRMA)	Gold	15,000^{*}
^{*} Sales figures based on certification alone.

== Commercial performance ==
It was awarded a gold certification from the Independent Music Companies Association which indicated sales of at least 100,000 copies throughout Europe. As of 2009, sales in the United States have exceeded 78,000 copies, according to Nielsen SoundScan.

== Personnel ==
The following people contributed to The Flying Club Cup:

Beirut

- Zach Condon - accordion, composer, conch shell, engineer, euphonium, farfisa organ, flugelhorn, french horn, glockenspiel, mandolin, mixing, percussion, piano, trumpet, ukulele, vocals, backup vocals, wurlitzer
- Jon Natchez - clarinet, bass clarinet, flute, mandolin, melodica, baritone saxophone
- Perrin Cloutier - accordion, upright bass, cello, viola, backup vocals
- Jason Poranski - mandolin, mandolin arrangement, backup vocals
- Nick Petree - guitar, percussion, backup vocals
- Kristin Ferebee - violin, backup vocals
- Heather Trost - viola, violin
- Kelly Pratt - euphonium
- Paul Collins - bouzouki

Additional personnel

- Owen Pallett - celeste, composer, harpsichord, organ, string arrangements, violin, vocals
- Griffin Rodriguez - engineer, mastering, mixing, backup vocals
- Alexandra Klasinski - design, layout design
- Kristianna Smith - design, layout design
- Kendrick Strauch - composer, piano
- Mark Lawson - engineer
- Ryan Condon - story
