= The Rip Tide =

Studio album by Beirut
- Released: August 30, 2011
- Genres: Indie pop; Balkan folk
- Length: 33:11
- Label: Pompeii Records
- Producers: Zach Condon; Griffin Rodriguez

Beirut chronology
March of the Zapotec/Holland EP (2009)	The Rip Tide (2011)	No No No (2015)

Singles from The Rip Tide
- 1. "East Harlem / Goshen" Released: June 3, 2011

The Rip Tide is the third studio album by the American indie folk band Beirut, released on August 30, 2011.

The album debuted at No. 88 on the Billboard 200, and peaked at No. 80 a month later. The album has sold 93,000 copies in the US as of August 2015. The album has received mostly positive reviews.

== Recording ==
Beirut's Zach Condon decided to write the album after a rough tour in Brazil, where he suffered a perforated eardrum and was involved in a stage invasion. Unlike previous Beirut albums, The Rip Tide was more reflective of places closer to home; for example, the song "Santa Fe" was a homage to Condon's hometown. Condon reflected on that, saying "The vagabond thing – that was a teenage fantasy that I lived out in a big way. Music, to me, was escapism. And now I'm doing everything that is the opposite [of that] in my life. I'm married. I've got a house. I've got a dog. So it felt ridiculous, the narrative of what my career was supposed to be, compared to what I was actually trying to attempt in my life."

Influenced by the recording of For Emma, Forever Ago, Condon wrote The Rip Tide while he spent six months in isolation living in a Bethel, New York winter cabin. Unlike Beirut's previous albums, the music was recorded as a band playing together instead of laying down individual tracks one at a time. However, the lyrics were only added by Condon after all the music had been recorded.

== Release ==
The first news that Beirut was recording a new album came in the winter of 2010–11 with an announcement from Ba Da Bing records:

Indeed, the band is recording. Basically, Zach [Condon] is going back and forth between doing recording sessions in a studio with the whole band, then taking the materials back home and editing them as well as working on vocals. He wants to take the rest of the year to make sure it's all up to snuff, so there will definitely be a Beirut record next year, but not sure when yet!

After recording, Beirut toured throughout Europe and the US, playing several songs that would appear on the album, including, "Vagabond," "Santa Fe," and "Port of Call.". On June 3, 2011, the band released The Rip Tide's first single, "East Harlem," with "Goshen" as its B-side, with a physical release on June 6, 2011. On June 7, 2011, Beirut officially announced the existence of the new album, disclosing both the title and track listing.

The Rip Tide was originally going to be released on August 30, 2011. Unlike previous albums, The Rip Tide was self-released on Condon's own Pompeii Records. However, an internet leak pushed the album's iTunes Store released date to August 2, 2011. The physical edition of the album was released in a cloth-bound, embossed package as a thank you gift to people who wanted a physical version.

== Critical reception ==
Professional ratings
Aggregate scores
Source	Rating
AnyDecentMusic?	7.6/10
Metacritic	78/100
Review scores
Source	Rating
AllMusic	4/5 stars
The A.V. Club	B
The Guardian	4/5 stars
The Irish Times	4/5 stars
Mojo	4/5 stars
NME	8/10
The Observer	3/5 stars
Pitchfork	7.7/10
Q	4/5 stars
Uncut	4/5 stars

The Rip Tide received large acclaim from contemporary music critics. At Metacritic, which assigns a normalized rating out of 100 to reviews from mainstream critics, the album received an average score of 78, based on 34 reviews, which indicates "generally favorable reviews".

Tim Jonze of The Guardian, in a positive review, wrote "It's less flashy than previous efforts, but the thrill here is of witnessing a songwriter's talent maturing." NME's Laura Snapes also gave the album a positive review, writing "These ideas of acceptance, hope and personal reflection make The Rip Tide an accomplished, restrained record, which sees Condon forgetting his travels, and forging his own native sound." Slant Magazine's Jesse Cataldo wrote that while "The songs are often still a little too cute, too twee and self-satisfied," Cataldo concluded that the songs were nevertheless "just as catchy without the burden of self-reflexive exoticism." AllMusic's James Christopher Monger enjoyed the album's more personal songs, writing "Condon spends much of Rip Tide writing in first person, and it lends an air of much needed intimacy to the always gorgeous, yet historically elusive Beirut sound."

PopMatters' Eric Brown, on the other hand, gave the album a more mixed review, writing "Beirut too often moves away from its world-folk origins into a more generic sound, one that has more in common with an Apple commercial than their breakthrough album. It's not necessarily a bad move — the songs are all well-composed and technically challenging — but The Rip Tide lacks an emotional core, or at the very least, an interesting hook in lieu of something more substantial." Brown continued: "I have to think that as an EP, The Rip Tide would be a rousing success. But as it is, there are just too many bland, uninspiring tracks that drag down the whole experience." Benjamin Boles of NOW was also less receptive to the album's sound, writing "Unfortunately, it all feels a bit too manicured and restrained. As easy as it is to hit repeat when the disc ends, trying to remember standout moments is another story. It’s a solid album, but too conservative to make many converts."

=== Accolades ===
The Rip Tide has appeared on a few end-of-year lists. Paste ranked The Rip Tide No. 20 on its list of the top 50 albums of 2011, while Mojo ranked the album No. 22 on its end-of-year list.

== In popular culture ==
The song "Goshen" from the album appeared in the series finale of season 5 of the NBC show Chuck.

== Track listing ==
All tracks are written by Zach Condon.

The Rip Tide track listing
No.	Title	Length
1.	"A Candle's Fire"	3:19
2.	"Santa Fe"	4:14
3.	"East Harlem"	3:58
4.	"Goshen"	3:20
5.	"Payne's Bay"	3:48
6.	"The Rip Tide"	4:26
7.	"Vagabond"	3:19
8.	"The Peacock"	2:26
9.	"Port of Call"	4:21
Total length:		33:10

== Personnel ==
- Zach Condon – vocals, ukulele, trumpet, piano, percussion, pedal bass, organ, pump organ
- Perrin Cloutier – accordion, piano, pump organ, cello
- Paul Collins – bass guitar, upright bass
- Ben Lanz – trombone, piano, tuba
- Nick Petree – drums, percussion
- Kelly Pratt – trumpet, euphonium, French horn, vocals

Guest appearances

- Sharon Van Etten – vocals
- Heather Trost – violin, vocals

== Charts ==
Chart performance for The Rip Tide
Chart (2011)	Peak position
Australia (ARIA)	92
Austrian Albums Chart	20
Belgian Albums Chart (Flanders)	7
Belgian Albums Chart (Wallonia)	22
Dutch Albums Chart	28
Finnish Albums Chart	32
French Albums Chart	42
German Albums Chart	69
New Zealand Albums Chart	26
Norwegian Albums Chart	28
Spanish Albums Chart	41
Swedish Albums Chart	52
Swiss Albums Chart	29
UK Albums Chart	49
US Billboard 200	80

== Release history ==
Release history and formats for The Rip Tide
Country	Date	Format	Label
United States	August 2, 2011	Digital download	Pompeii Records
United States	August 30, 2011	CD	Pompeii Records
United Kingdom	August 29, 2011	CD	Pompeii Records
