= Gallipoli (album) =

Studio album by Beirut
- Released: February 1, 2019
- Recorded: Midwinter 2016; October 2017
- Studios: The Relic Room, New York City; Sudestudio, Guagnano, Italy; Kaiku Studios, Berlin, Germany
- Length: 44:32
- Label: 4AD
- Producers: Zach Condon; Gabe Wax

Beirut chronology
No No No (2015)	Gallipoli (2019)	Artifacts (2022)

Singles from Gallipoli
- 1. "Gallipoli" Released: October 22, 2018; 2. "Corfu" Released: October 26, 2018; 3. "Landslide" Released: January 10, 2019

Gallipoli is the fifth studio album by indie folk band Beirut. It was released on February 1, 2019, by 4AD. The album is named after the Italian town where the title track was written. It is supported by the singles "Gallipoli", "Corfu" and "Landslide". The band toured across North America and Europe in support of the album in 2019.

== Background ==
Work on the album began in late 2016, with Zach Condon holding recording sessions in various cities, including New York City, Apulia, Italy, and Berlin (where Condon lives). The album is produced by Condon and Gabe Wax, who also produced the band's previous album, 2015's No No No. It features Condon playing his old Farfisa organ from Santa Fe which was used on Gulag Orkestar and The Flying Club Cup. The album was announced in a statement on the band's Facebook page that also explained the timeline of its creation.

Condon's first album since moving to Berlin and familiarising himself with the city's experimental electronic music scene, Gallipoli is an album of "loopy, burbling, shape-shifting tracks" that takes influence from electronic duo Mouse on Mars. AllMusic's Marcy Donelson wrote that Condon channeled performances "through a series of amplifiers, PA systems, and tape machines" in order to "capture sounds like mechanical buzzing, creaking instruments, and off-pitch tones".

According to Stephen Dalton of Uncut, the album features more "studio buzz and random dissonance" than Condon's previous albums, elaborating: "Generous helpings of crackle and hiss are retained in the mix, creating an almost musique concrète effect in places. Amid the usual parping trumpets and ukulele twangs are modular synths, tape loops, echo-drenched vintage organs, avant-jazz audioscapes and ambient sound paintings." Donelson wrote that the album's usage of full instrumentation, colourful arrangements and dense production prevents the album from becoming lo-fi, despite Condon's stated wish to capture organic sounds.

== Critical reception ==
Professional ratings
Aggregate scores
Source	Rating
AnyDecentMusic?	7.0/10
Metacritic	75/100
Review scores
Source	Rating
AllMusic	4/5 stars
Exclaim!	6/10
The Guardian	3/5 stars
Mojo	3/5 stars
NME	4/5 stars
Pitchfork	6.6/10
PopMatters	8/10
Q	4/5 stars
Rolling Stone	4/5 stars
The Times	2/5 stars

At Metacritic, which assigns a normalised rating out of 100 to reviews from mainstream publications, the album received an average score of 75, indicating generally favorable reviews.

Ragan Clark of the Associated Press praised the album and called it a "return to vocal and expressive brilliance", saying, "Some of the zest lacking in the band’s 2015 album No No No is fully realized in this new album." Will Hermes of Rolling Stone gave the album a favorable review, saying, "Condon's built an entire world with globetrotting horn charts at or near the heart, and Gallipoli revisits it with some of his most emotive songwriting and singing." Paddy Kinsella of The Line of Best Fit praised the album as the band's best to date, stating, "[Gallipoli] is the sound of one of our most talented musicians rediscovering his love for what he was born to do. It's Zach Condon's career highlight so far and shows that he's at his best when he enjoys making music and cares less about what critics and fans might think of it. Long may it continue."

Writing for The Times, Will Hodgkinson gave the album 2 out of 5 stars, saying the album "never seems to get beyond its own sense of sophistication." Alex Hudson of Exclaim! gave the album a 6/10, writing, "There's enough material here for a solid EP, but it's rather thin for a full-length." Victoria Segal of Mojo said, "Gallipoli [...] is oddly unmoving, lacking range for all its seductive picturesque roaming".

== Track listing ==
All lyrics are written by Zach Condon, except where noted; all music is composed by Zach Condon.

No.	Title	Lyrics	Length
1.	"When I Die"	Zach Condon; Ryan Condon	3:16
2.	"Gallipoli"		4:06
3.	"Varieties of Exile"		5:27
4.	"On Mainau Island"		2:13
5.	"I Giardini"		3:43
6.	"Gauze für Zah"		6:04
7.	"Corfu"		2:35
8.	"Landslide"		3:30
9.	"Family Curse"		3:23
10.	"Light in the Atoll"		3:59
11.	"We Never Lived Here"		4:12
12.	"Fin"		2:03
Total length:			44:32

== Personnel ==
The following people contributed to Gallipoli:

Beirut

- Zach Condon – vocals (1–3, 5, 6, 8–12), backing vocals (6), piano (5–12), Rhodes piano (3, 12), Farfisa organ (2–4, 6–9), Hammond organ (1), pump organ (9), ukulele (1, 3, 5), trumpet (1–3, 6, 8–11), accordion (3), percussion (2–5, 7, 8, 10), synth (10), Moog Voyager synthesizer (1, 2, 4–9), modular synthesizer (7, 11, 12), bells (4), Roland keyboard (5), ROLI Seaboard keyboard (6), shaker (6), drum machine (9), vocal recording, production, mixing
- Nick Petree – drums (1, 3–6, 8–10, 12), percussion (1–8, 10, 11), baritone ukulele (1, 6), backing vocals (6), hand drums (7, 10)
- Paul Collins – bass (1–3, 7–10, 12), guitar (1, 3, 7, 10), Farfisa organ (2), double bass (6, 11), backing vocals (6), tape machine (6), drum machine (7), modular synthesizer (7, 11, 12), baritone guitar (8), percussion (8), synthesizer (9), space echo (12)
- Ben Lanz – trombone (10, 11), brass arrangement (11)
- Kyle Resnick – trumpet (10, 11)

Additional personnel

- Gabe Wax – production, mixing, engineering
- Francesco Donadello – mastering
- Norman Nitzsche – mastering
- Brody Condon – artwork
- Ben Wilkerson Tousley – design

== Charts ==
=== Weekly charts ===
Chart (2019)	Peak position
Australia (ARIA Hitseekers)	15
Austrian Albums (Ö3 Austria)	10
Belgian Albums (Ultratop Flanders)	4
Belgian Albums (Ultratop Wallonia)	74
Dutch Albums (Album Top 100)	36
French Albums (SNEP)	75
German Albums (Offizielle Top 100)	21
Portuguese Albums (Associação Fonográfica Portuguesa)	6
Scottish Albums (Official Charts)	26
Spanish Albums (PROMUSICAE)	48
Swiss Albums (Schweizer Hitparade)	21
UK Albums (Official Charts)	61
US Independent Albums (Billboard)	3
US Top Rock Albums (Billboard)	42

=== Year-end charts ===
Chart (2019)	Position
Belgian Albums (Ultratop Flanders)	193
