= Suicide Prevention Hotline =

Suicide Prevention Hotline EP (Rest In Peace)

EP by Alaska in Winter
- Released: May 31, 2011
- Recorded: 2008–2011
- Genre: Electronica
- Label: AIWM
- Producer: Brandon Bethancourt

Alaska in Winter chronology
B-sides & Other Missed Opportunities EP (2011)	Suicide Prevention Hotline EP (Rest In Peace) (2011)

Suicide Prevention Hotline EP is an official extended play release from Alaska in Winter. It debuted 31 May 2011 through the band's Blogspot account, and a note published on its Facebook page. According to frontman Brandon Bethancourt, although the extended play is available merely on twenty micro-cassettes through his BigCartel page as an exclusive pre-release, the extended play will formally be released in "CD and mp3 form soon." The limited-edition micro-cassette format is designed for usage in telephone answering machines lest the "unanswered cries" from the extended play not be heard by listeners. Additionally, the limited-edition "pre-release" package includes a pill bottle, which contains a personal, but brief, message, written by Bethancourt himself.

== Track listing ==
1. "Forever Twenty-One Gun Salute (micro version)"
2. "Demons"
3. "Dancing With Death (micro version)"
4. "Divine Miscalculations"*
5. "Downward Spiral Dial Tone (micro version)"*
- - On Side B (micro-cassette edition).

== Personnel ==
- Brandon Bethancourt - Vocals, Keyboards
