= B-sides & Other Missed Opportunities =

EP by Alaska in Winter

B-sides & Other Missed Opportunities EP

Studio album by Alaska in Winter
- Released: February 15, 2011 (US)
- Recorded: 2008–2010
- Genre: Electronica
- Length: 46:20
- Label: AIWM (US)
- Producer: Brandon Bethancourt

Alaska in Winter chronology
Space Eagle (the motion picture soundtrack) (2010)	B-sides & Other Missed Opportunities EP (2011)	Suicide Prevention Hotline EP (2011)

B-sides & Other Missed Opportunities EP is an official extended play release from Alaska in Winter. It debuted 15 February 2011 via Gogoyoko.com and a note published on Alaska in Winter's Facebook page. In addition to the aforementioned digitally based release, a second version is expected before the 13 March, according to frontman Brandon Bethancourt. On this release, he expects his fans to, after receiving his printed discs, have their "minds...blown so hard (he) can't even think about it." Furthermore, he stated that the second release "will involve floppy disks and 3 extra songs not available on the download!!!" True to his word, Bethancourt announced the release of the limited, second edition on March 9. Only 200 copies of the second version, which comes as a CD with a floppy disk as a sleeve and contains three exclusive songs, were released, according to his Facebook post regarding it. As of March 6, 2011, 'B-sides' is the highest-rated 'New Album' on Gogoyoko.com, garnering a rating of 9.2/10.

== Track listing ==
Track listing
No.	Title	Length
1.	"Berlin" (club version)	6:58
2.	"Horsey Horse the 3rd"	5:29
3.	"Speedboat to Homelessness" (live mash-up version)	5:44
4.	"Streetgang 3" (live vocal version)	3:18
5.	"Chemical Salvation" (instrumental)	4:47
6.	"Year 2" (vox version by Sun Allergies)	8:06
7.	"Airwolfe Remix" (by Hari Z.; exclusively available via the limited edition "floppy disks")	4:41
8.	"Space Eagle Dedication" (by Moon Ranger; exclusively available via the limited edition "floppy disks")	3:25
9.	"Balkan Lowrider Tribute" (by Moon Ranger; exclusively available via the limited edition "floppy disks")	3:52

== Personnel ==
- Brandon Bethancourt – vocals, keyboards
