= Strange Moosic =

Studio album by Herman Düne
- Released: 2011
- Genre: Anti-Folk
- Length: 41:05
- Label: Strange Moosic; City Slang

Herman Düne chronology
Next Year in Zion (2008)	Strange Moosic (2011)

Professional ratings
Review scores
Source	Rating
AllMusic	3.5/5 stars
Drowned in Sound	5/10
musicOMH	3.5/5 stars
The Skinny	4/5 stars

Strange Moosic is a 2011 studio album by Herman Düne. A video made for the album starred Jon Hamm and a blue yeti-esque creature.

== Critical reception ==
The Guardian wrote: "Innocent indie pop with a dash of wit is still this duo's raison d'être and they do it wonderfully well on Strange Moosic." BBC's Garry Mulholland gave the album a favourable review and named it their best album.

== Track list ==
1. Tell Me Something I Don't Know – 3:35
2. Ah Hears Strange Moosic – 3:39
3. Be a Doll and Take My Heart – 3:02
4. Where Is the Man? – 3:07
5. Lay Your Head on My Chest – 3:57
6. Monument Park – 2:27
7. In the Long Long Run – 5:00
8. Your Love Is Gold – 2:41
9. The Rock – 3:52
10. Just Like Summer – 4:02
11. My Joy – 2:02
12. Magician – 3:41
