= March of the Zapotec/Holland EP =

March of the Zapotec/Realpeople-Holland

EP by Beirut
- Released: February 17, 2009
- Genres: Indie folk, Balkan folk, electronica
- Length: 34:47
- Label: Pompeii Records

Beirut chronology
The Flying Club Cup (2007)	March of the Zapotec/Realpeople-Holland (2009)	The Rip Tide (2011)

Professional ratings
Review scores
Source	Rating
Drowned in Sound	(8/10)
NME	(8/10)
Pitchfork	(8.1/10)
Rolling Stone	2.5/5 stars

March of the Zapotec/Holland is a double EP by Beirut. March of the Zapotec contains music influenced by Zach Condon's then recent trip to Oaxaca, Mexico. The Jimenez Band, a 19-piece band from Teotitlán del Valle, backs Condon on this EP. March of the Zapotec also features one of Condon's favorite works, "The Shrew". Holland contains electronic music, credited to "Realpeople", one of Condon's pre-Beirut pseudonyms.

== Leak and early release ==
On January 23, 2009, the EPs leaked to file-sharing networks, and four days later, on January 27, the iTunes US and UK stores made the album available for purchase.

== Track listing ==
All tracks are written by Zach Condon, except where noted.

March of the Zapotec
No.	Title	Writer(s)	Length
1.	"El Zócalo"		0:29
2.	"La Llorona"		3:34
3.	"My Wife"	Zach Condon; Perrin Cloutier	2:11
4.	"The Akara"		3:54
5.	"On a Bayonet"	Zach Condon; Perrin Cloutier	1:41
6.	"The Shrew"		3:44
Total length:			15:33

Realpeople: Holland
No.	Title	Length
1.	"My Night with the Prostitute from Marseille"	3:07
2.	"My Wife, Lost in the Wild"	3:13
3.	"Venice"	4:02
4.	"The Concubine"	3:28
5.	"No Dice"	5:24
Total length:		19:14

== Music videos ==
Owen Cook animated and directed the official video for "La Llorona", which is thematically related to the legend of La Llorona, a popular story from Mexico also famous in other places in Central America.
