= A Study of Losses =

Studio album by Beirut
- Released: April 18, 2025
- Studios: Unknown studios (Berlin and Stokmarknes); Dreamland (Hurley)
- Genre: Orchestral pop
- Length: 57:10
- Label: Pompeii

Beirut chronology
Hadsel (2023)	A Study of Losses (2025)

Singles from A Study of Losses
- 1. "Caspian Tiger" Released: November 14, 2024; 2. "Guericke's Unicorn" Released: February 13, 2025

A Study of Losses is the seventh studio album by American folk band Beirut, released on April 18, 2025, by Pompeii Records. Featuring eighteen songs including two singles, "Caspian Tiger" and "Guericke's Unicorn", the album received positive critical reception from multiple publications, including Uncut Magazine.

== Background ==
Recorded in Berlin, Germany and Stokmarknes, Norway, for Swedish circus Kompani Giraff, A Study of Losses is based on a book titled Verzeichnis einiger Verluste by German writer Judith Schalansky.

Stylistically noted as encompassing "wide-ranging chamber folk", the album consists of eighteen songs including seven instrumentals ranging between two and four minutes each, excluding "Guericke's Unicorn", which surpasses four minutes. It succeeds the band's 2023 album, Hadsel.

Beirut released the album's first single, "Caspian Tiger", on November 14, 2024. The second single, "Guericke's Unicorn", was released on February 13, 2025, alongside a music video.

== Reception ==
Professional ratings
Aggregate scores
Source	Rating
Metacritic	79/100
Review scores
Source	Rating
AllMusic	4/5 stars
Hot Press	8/10 stars
Pitchfork	7.4/10
Uncut	8/10 stars

A Study of Losses received positive reviews from critics. At Metacritic, which assigns a normalized rating out of 100 to reviews from mainstream critics, the album received an average score of 79 based on eight reviews, indicating "generally favorable reviews".

The Line of Best Fit remarked, "A Study of Losses finds Condon writing about disappearance, preservation and the impermanence of everything known to us – extinct animal species, lost architectural and literary treasures, the process of aging and other abstract concepts." Hot Press rated the album eight out of ten and stated, "The synth-based 'Ghost Train' and 'Guericke's Unicorn', while impressive, sit a little uneasily alongside the album's more acoustic core. But overall, A Study of Losses is wilfully and wonderfully odd."

AllMusic assigned it a rating of four stars and described it as "appropriately melancholy in nature" and "inspired by the tale of a man obsessed with archiving humankind's lost thoughts and creations". Pitchfork gave it a rating of 7.4 out of ten, and referred to it as "an example of the peculiar magic that can happen under seemingly absurd circumstances." The Times commented, "Zach Condon has created a tender, sombre work which glides by with ease."

Uncut noted it as "a further example of his fluency in the ancient, internationally shared languages of wonder and imagining," rating the album eight out of ten, while Mojo referred to it as "what might be his most beautiful record to date, particularly the instrumental numbers".

== Track listing ==
All tracks are written by Zach Condon.

A Study of Losses track listing
No.	Title	Length
1.	"Disappearances and Losses"	2:24
2.	"Forest Encyclopedia"	3:49
3.	"Oceanus Procellarum"	2:24
4.	"Villa Sacchetti"	3:26
5.	"Mare Crisium"	2:46
6.	"Garbo's Face"	3:10
7.	"Mare Imbrium"	2:11
8.	"Tuanaki Atoll"	3:22
9.	"Mare Serenitatis"	2:21
10.	"Guericke's Unicorn"	4:24
11.	"Mare Humorum"	2:38
12.	"Sappho's Poems"	2:30
13.	"Ghost Train"	3:41
14.	"Caspian Tiger"	3:58
15.	"Mani's 7 Books"	3:10
16.	"Moon Voyager"	3:47
17.	"Mare Nectaris"	3:42
18.	"Mare Tranquillitatis"	3:27
Total length:		57:10

== Personnel ==
Credits adapted from the album's liner notes.

=== Beirut ===
- Zach Condon – vocals, recording, all instruments (except where noted)
- Nick Petree – drums (tracks 10, 15)

=== Additional contributors ===
- Francesco Donadello – mixing, mastering
- John Valesio – strings recording
- Clarice Jensen – string arrangements, cello (tracks 3, 5, 7, 9–11, 14, 15)
- Griffin Rodriguez – upright bass (tracks 3, 14)
- Laura Lutzke – violin (tracks 3, 5, 7, 9–11, 14, 15)
- Ben Russell – violin (tracks 3, 5, 7, 9–11, 14, 15)
- Kyle Miller – viola (tracks 3, 5, 7, 9–11, 14, 15)
- Linda Gaißer – artwork, photography, design

== Charts ==
Chart performance for A Study of Losses
Chart (2025)	Peak position
Belgian Albums (Ultratop Flanders)	81
German Albums (Offizielle Top 100)	79
Swiss Albums (Schweizer Hitparade)	97
UK Album Downloads (Official Charts)	43
UK Independent Albums (Official Charts)	18
