= No No No (Beirut album) =

Studio album by Beirut
- Released: September 11, 2015
- Genres: Indie pop; Balkan folk
- Length: 29:17
- Label: 4AD
- Producers: Zach Condon; Gabe Wax

Beirut chronology
The Rip Tide (2011)	No No No (2015)	Gallipoli (2019)

Singles from No No No
- 1. "No No No" Released: June 1, 2015; 2. "Gibraltar" Released: August 18, 2015

No No No is the fourth studio album by indie folk band Beirut. It was released on September 11, 2015 on 4AD.

== Music and lyrics ==
Josh Jackson of Paste Magazine said: "Few bands operate in musical territory all their own, but the way horns weave through these tender ballads remains unique and gives the music a distinct bittersweetness as teasingly joyous melodies belie Condon’s snippets of loneliness and heartache." On the album's lyrical themes, Jackson explained: "Condon lost love and then found it while making this record, but rather than write songs about either, he managed to infuse every song on the record with bits of both, a beautiful jumble of emotions that hits you all at once."

== Critical reception ==
Professional ratings
Aggregate scores
Source	Rating
Metacritic	64/100
Review scores
Source	Rating
AllMusic	3.5/5 stars
Consequence of Sound	C+
Drowned in Sound	8/10
Exclaim!	8/10
MusicOMH	3/5 stars
NME	2/5
Pitchfork	6.7/10
Spin	5/10

No No No received generally positive reviews from contemporary music critics. At Metacritic, which assigns a normalized rating out of 100 to reviews from mainstream critics, the album received an average score of 64, based on 20 reviews, which indicates "generally favorable reviews".

Mackenzie Herd of Exclaim! praised the album, stating, "Despite rhythmic vitality and the addition of optimistic trumpet and trombone, Condon's lyrics reveal a man still suffering from loss and longing. Although none of the nine songs exceed the four-minute mark, the lyrics for each are even shorter by comparison, and are often repeated for emphasis. Repetition as a rhetorical device is perhaps most evident on "Fener," on which Condon sings, "I had to know, I had to know, where you had gone," or the title track, when Condon repeats the same stanza twice over. Condon is at the heart of each song, so while a hopeful tone is central to both the music and lyrics, No No No is a portrait of a man putting on a brave face while piecing his life back together, and it's all the more engaging for it."

NME was more critical of the album, stating, "While 2011’s ‘The Rip Tide’ was certainly more pared down in comparison to its orchestral predecessors, here Condon (who went through a divorce and hospital treatment for exhaustion before making this new record) seems to have stripped away his most intriguing tropes altogether. The corny staccato keys of ‘August Holland’ merely churn on like a Ben Folds Five cast-off and Condon moans aimlessly over ‘Pacheco’’s gooey synth schmaltz in search of a chorus, never quite finding the hooks to base one on."

== Track listing ==
All tracks are written by Zach Condon.

No.	Title	Length
1.	"Gibraltar"	3:41
2.	"No No No"	2:50
3.	"At Once"	2:06
4.	"August Holland"	3:30
5.	"As Needed"	3:18
6.	"Perth"	3:37
7.	"Pacheco"	3:08
8.	"Fener"	3:28
9.	"So Allowed"	3:39
Total length:		29:17

== Personnel ==
- Zach Condon – vocals, piano, synthesizer (Roland, Moog Rogue, Korg, Moog Sub Phatty, Moog Voyager, juno), trumpet, organ (farfisa, pump organ), electric piano (wurlitzer), mellotron, ukulele, rhodes, celesta
- Nick Petree – percussion, acoustic and electric guitar, backing vocals
- Paul Collins – bass, electric guitar, double bass, organ (farfisa), backing vocals
- Ben Lanz – trombone
- Kyle Resnick – trumpet
- Clarice Jensen – cello
- Perrin Cloutier – tom tom (tom drum), accordion
- Ben Russell – violin
- Yuki Numata Resnick – violin

== Charts ==
Chart (2015)	Peak position
Australian Albums (ARIA)	63
Austrian Albums (Ö3 Austria)	12
Belgian Albums (Ultratop Flanders)	8
Belgian Albums (Ultratop Wallonia)	17
Dutch Albums (Album Top 100)	13
French Albums (SNEP)	24
German Albums (Offizielle Top 100)	38
Irish Albums (IRMA)	62
New Zealand Albums (RMNZ)	39
Portuguese Albums (AFP)	28
Scottish Albums (Official Charts)	46
Swiss Albums (Schweizer Hitparade)	38
UK Albums (Official Charts)	37
UK Independent Albums (Official Charts)	4
US Billboard 200	46
US Top Rock Albums (Billboard)	10
US Top Alternative Albums (Billboard)	7
US Top Current Album Sales (Billboard)	28
US Independent Albums (Billboard)	7
US Vinyl Albums (Billboard)	3
