= Alaska in Winter =

Electronic band

- Origin: Albuquerque, New Mexico, U.S.
- Genres: Electronic
- Years active: 2005–2011
- Past members: Brandon Bethancourt; Zach Condon; Heather Trost; Hari Ziznewski; Stefanie Lamm; Rosina Roibal; Hilary Bethancourt; Naila Dixon

Alaska in Winter was an American electronic band, consisting of frontman Brandon Bethancourt, who dropped out of art school in Albuquerque, New Mexico, and reportedly, "spent a semester in a tiny cabin out in the middle of nowhere Alaska recording music on a laptop during the winter", and which later came to be known as the project, "Alaska in Winter".

== History ==
After completing his project in Alaska, Bethancourt returned to New Mexico and enlisted the help of fellow musicians Zach Condon (Beirut), Heather Trost (A Hawk and a Hacksaw), Hari Ziznewski, Stefanie Lamm, Rosina Roibal, Hilary Bethancourt, and Naila Dixon to help with his later musical project. The band's debut album, Dance Party in the Balkans, featured Zach Condon, who later founded Beirut.

Bethancourt has been living in Berlin, Germany, where he recorded his second album, Holiday, which was released November 17, 2008. After releasing "Holiday," Bethancourt moved to Santa Fe, New Mexico, where he currently resides.

Under his independent label, AIWM, Bethancourt released his third and most recent album, Space Eagle (the motion picture soundtrack), on February 16, 2010. Only 100 copies in cassette tape form have been printed, as announced by Bethancourt. On October 6, 2010, Bethancourt released the cover art for an upcoming EP, which he has entitled, "B-Sides and Other Missed Opportunities EP." He followed up the announcement with the release of the extended play on February 15, 2011. On May 31, 2011, Bethancourt announced the "pre-release" for his second extended play for 2011, which he dubbed Suicide Prevention Hotline. Additionally, Alaska in Winter won the ninth-annual Independent Music Award Vox Pop vote for best Dance/Electronica Album "Berlin".

== Discography ==
- Ivan Fyodorovich is Not a Real Person (self release/unreleased) (2005)
- Dance Party in the Balkans (European release) (July 2007)
- Dance Party in the Balkans (US release) (March 2008)
- Close Your Eyes- We Are Blind 7" split vinyl with Marianne Dissard (May 2008)
- Remixes 12" vinyl (October 2008)
- Holiday (November 2008)
- Space Eagle (the motion picture soundtrack) (February 2010)
- B-sides & Other Missed Opportunities EP (February 2011)
- Suicide Prevention Hotline EP (May 2011)
- Memorex Floppy Disk 7" Vinyl EP (October 2011)
- Airwolfe Flexi Disc (November 2011)
- December Compositions (December 2011)
