= Space Eagle (the motion picture soundtrack) =

Studio album by Alaska in Winter
- Released: February 16, 2010 (US)
- Recorded: 2009
- Genre: Electronica
- Length: TBD
- Label: AIWM (US)
- Producer: Brandon Bethancourt

Alaska in Winter chronology
Holiday (2008)	Space Eagle (the motion picture soundtrack) (2010)	B-sides & Other Missed Opportunities EP (2011)

Space Eagle (the motion picture soundtrack) is officially the 3rd full-length release from Alaska in Winter. It debuted 16 February 2010 via iTunes and a note published on Alaska in Winter's Facebook page. The album was announced as a limited release of 100 copies and in cassette tape form only. The tracks "Airwolfe", "Airwolfe in Miami", and "The Outro" are only available on the cassette, while the rest of the track listing is available for purchase on iTunes.

== Track listing ==
1. "Metroid" – 1:17
2. "Crystal Tears" – 5:09
3. "Space Eagle" – 9:15
4. "Castle in the Sky" – 3:18
5. "Airwolfe" – (?)
6. "Airwolfe in Miami" – 4:37
7. "Night Falcon Returns" – 6:15
8. "Ghost Pterodactyl" – 2:59
9. "Digital Angel of Death" – 3:38
10. "Sunrise Over Deutschland" – 5:43
11. "The Outro" – (?)

== Personnel ==
- Brandon Bethancourt - Vocals, Keyboards
