= Pompeii (EP) =

Pompeii EP

EP by Beirut
- Released: April 24, 2007
- Genre: Indie folk
- Length: 7:30
- Label: Ba Da Bing

Beirut chronology
Lon Gisland, (EP) (2007)	Pompeii EP (2007)	Elephant Gun (EP) (2007)

Pompeii is an EP by Beirut, released in 2007. It features only the work of Zach Condon and pre-dates the Gulag Orkestar debut album. While initially only available exclusively through eMusic and Rough Trade Digital, it later could be found on iTunes and Amazon. The Amazon version included a third song called "Monna Pomona". The album cover features Zach Condon (on the left) and his younger brother Ross Condon (on the right).

== Track listing ==
All tracks are written by Zach Condon.

No.	Title	Length
1.	"Fountains and Tramways"	4:01
2.	"Napoleon on the Bellerophon"	3:31
Total length:		7:30

Amazon bonus track
No.	Title	Length
3.	"Monna Pomona"	2:11
Total length:		9:41
