= Not on Top =

Not On Top

Studio album by Herman Düne
- Released: 2005
- Recorded: July 2004
- Genre: Anti-folk
- Length: 44:07
- Label: Track & Field
- Producer: Herman Düne & Richard Formby

Herman Düne chronology
Mash Concrete Metal Mushroom (2003)	Not On Top (2005)	Giant (2006)

Not On Top is a 2005 album by Herman Düne.

On this record Herman Düne are augmented by Canadian singer-songwriter Julie Doiron, who plays bass and provides some of the vocals. This is Herman Düne's first record to make significant use of bass guitar. It was recorded at Hall Place Studios in Leeds, England. Unusually for an album of the 21st century it was deliberately recorded in mono.

== Track listing ==
1. "Little Wounds" – 3:15
2. "Not On Top" – 3:32
3. "Had I Not Known" – 3:04
4. "Walk, Don't Run" – 3:37
5. "Slow Century" – 3:15
6. "This Will Never Happen" – 3:51
7. "German Green" – 0:59
8. "Recording Farfisa" – 0:51
9. "You Could Be A Model, Goodbye" – 3:18
10. "Seven Cities" – 3:05
11. "Good For No One" – 4:07
12. "Orange Hat" – 3:01
13. "Whatever Burns The Best Baby" – 3:42
14. "Eleven Stones" – 3:07
15. "Warning Spectrum" – 1:18

== Personnel ==
- David-Ivar Herman Düne – vocals, Gibson & Levin guitars, ukulele, piano
- André Herman Düne – vocals, Silvertone guitar, Simon & Patrick guitar, piano, lapsteel guitar
- Neman – drums, percussion, saw, flute
- Julie Doiron – eko bass, vocals, ukulele
- Lisa Li-Lund – vocals
- Dave Tatersall – vocals, Gibson guitar, handclaps
- Rachel MacWatt – vocals
- Gill Iles – vocals
- Alice Hubley – vocals

== Chart performance ==
Chart (2005)	Peak position
French Albums (SNEP)	171
