= Herman Dune =

Swedish-French indie rock band

Herman Düne
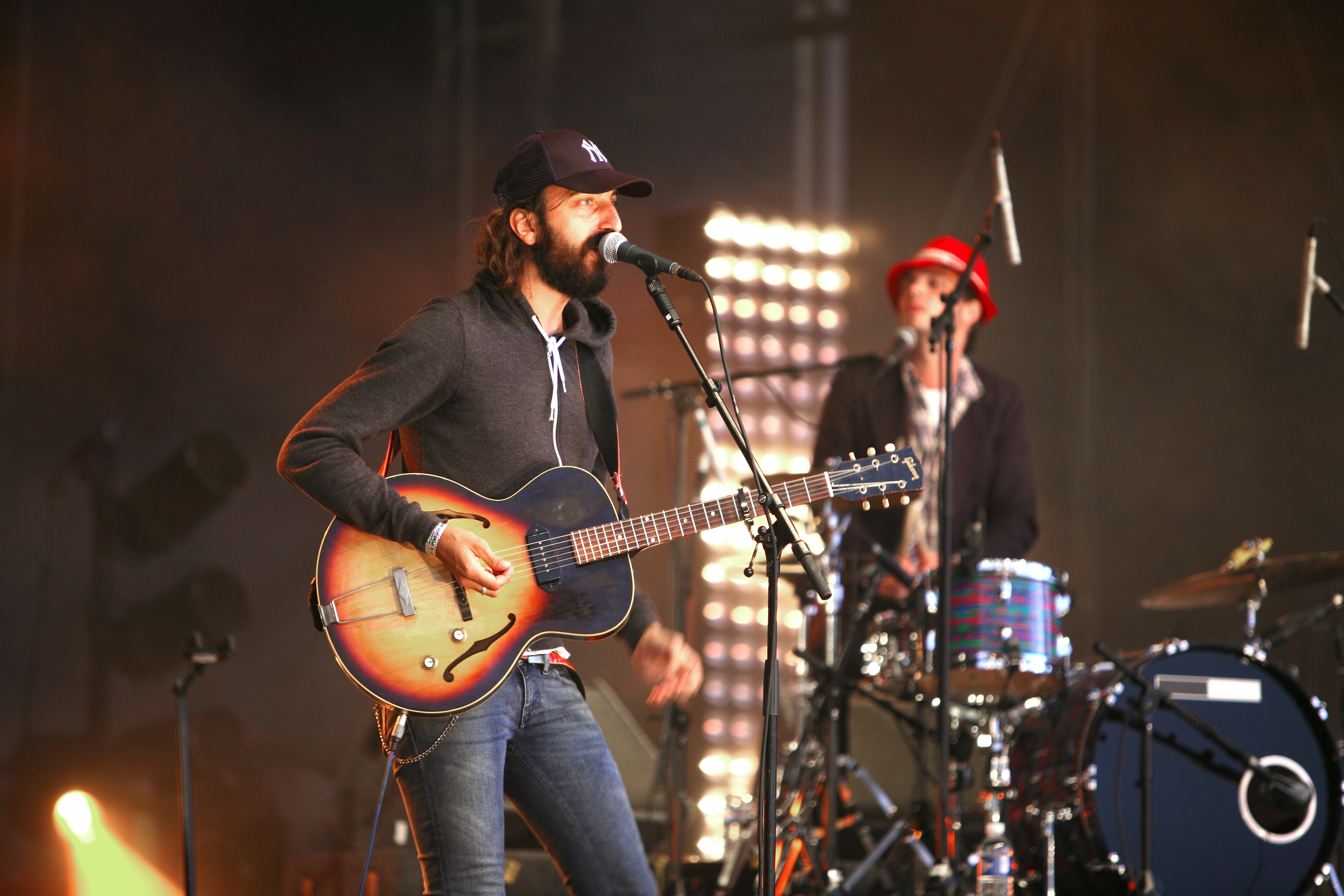
- David-Ivar Herman Düne and Neman Herman Düne (Herman Düne) at Route du Rock, August 2007

Background information
- Origin: Paris, France
- Genres: Folk rock, indie rock, alternative rock, indie folk, Americana, alternative country
- Years active: 1999–present
- Labels: Source, etc. Everloving Records; Shrimper Records; The Track & Field Organisation; GUM Records; City Slang Records; Strange Moosic Records; Santa Cruz Records; BB*Island
- Members: David Ivar Herman Dune
- Past members: André Herman Düne; Omé; Néman Herman Dune

Herman Dune is a Swedish-French act based in San Pedro, Los Angeles. The band has been described as indie rock, anti-folk, folk rock, alternative rock, Americana, and alternative country.

== History ==
Herman Dune was established as a trio with brothers David Ivar and André singing and writing, and drummer Omé, David Ivar's childhood friend. In 2000, they released their debut album, Turn Off the Light.

In 2001, drummer Neman joined Herman Dune for their following albums, Switzerland Heritage, Mash Concrete Metal Mushroom, Mas Cambios, and Not On Top.

Herman Dune then released Giant in 2006, Next Year In Zion in 2008, and Strange Moosic in 2011. In 2006, Andre left the band after recording songs for Giant.

After a hiatus and relocation to San Pedro, Los Angeles in 2015, David Ivar released Sweet Thursday on Santa Cruz Records and Santa Cruz Gold on Santa Cruz Records, both in 2018.

Between 2013 and 2018, while still performing as Herman Dune, David Ivar also performed as Black Yaya, with the eponymous album Black Yaya and the album Rattle Snake, a concept album about Bonnie and Clyde.

Since 2006, André has been pursuing his own solo career as Stanley Brinks. Omé earned his MD and PhD and works as a physician at Hôpital Bichat-Claude-Bernard in Paris. Néman is the frontman of the band Zombie Zombie.

== Discography ==
=== Albums ===
- Turn Off the Light (2000, Prohibited Records)
- They Go to the Woods (2001, Shrimper Records)
- Switzerland Heritage (2001, Prohibited Records)
- The Whys and the Hows of Herman Dune & Cerberus Shoal (with Cerberus Shoal) (2002, North East Indie Records )
- Mas Cambios (2003, The Track & Field Organisation)
- Mash Concrete Metal Mushroom (2003, Shrimper Records)
- Not on Top (2005, The Track & Field Organisation)
- Giant (2006, Source Etc.)
- Next Year in Zion (Fall 2008, Source Etc., Everloving Records, Cityslang)
- Strange Moosic (May 2011, Indie Europe/Zoom)
- Mariage à Mendoza (2013, Strange Moosic/Gum)
- Sweet Thursday (2018, Santa Cruz Records)
- Santa Cruz Gold (2018, Santa Cruz Records)
- Notes from Vinegar Hill (2020, B B * Island)
- The Portable Herman Dune Vol.1 (2022, Bb*Island / Cargo)
- The Portable Herman Dune Vol.2 (2023, Bb*Island / Cargo)
- The Portable Herman Dune Vol.3 (2023, Bb*Island / Cargo)
- Odysseús (2025, Bb*Island / Cargo)

=== Singles ===
- Money Makers on My Back (1997, self release)
- Glow in the Dark EP (1998, Ruminance Records)
- The Fire EP (2000, Prohibited Records)
- Between the Little Houses (2001, Prohibited Records)
- A Wiser Man (2004, Hype City Records)
- Jackson Heights EP (2005, The Track & Field Organisation)
- Not on top (2006, The Track & Field Organisation)
- I Wish That I Could See You Soon (2007, Source Etc.)
- 1-2-3 / Apple Tree (2008, [2008, Source Etc.)
- My Home Is Nowhere Without You (2008, Everloving Records)
- Tell Me Something I Don't Know (2011, Indie Europe/Zoom)
