= Margo Cilker =

American country musician (born c.1993)

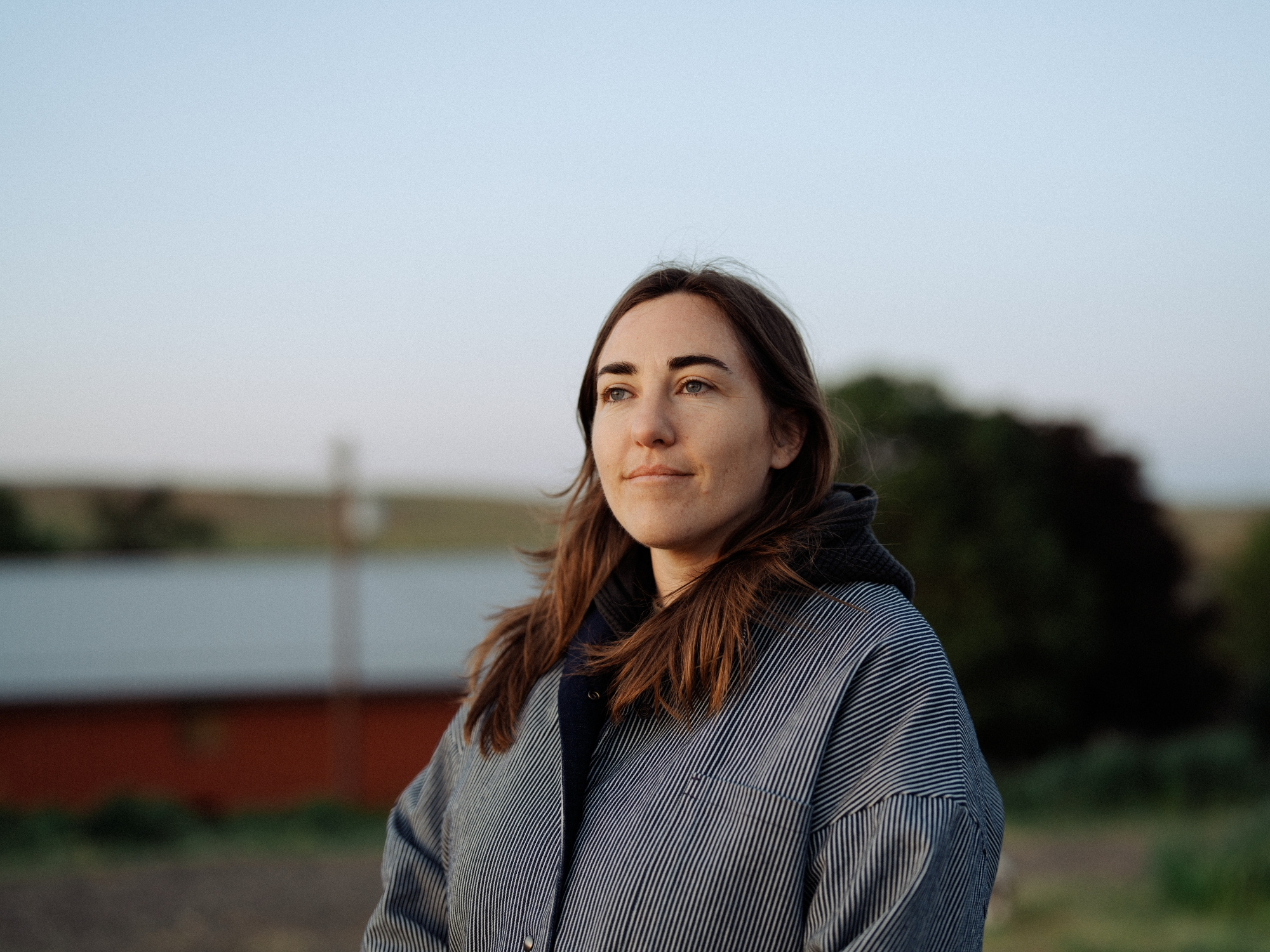
- Cilker in 2026

Background information
- Born: c. 1993 (age 32–33)
- Origin: Santa Clara Valley, California, United States
- Genres: Country, Americana, folk
- Instruments: Vocals; acoustic guitar
- Award: UK Americana Music Awards nomination for International Album of the Year

Margo Cilker (born c. 1993) is an American singer-songwriter based in the Pacific Northwest. She is known for blending classic country and western folk traditions and has drawn comparisons to Lucinda Williams.

Cilker has released two full-length albums via Portland-based record label Fluff & Gravy, Pohorylle (2021) and Valley of Heart's Delight (2023), both were produced by Sera Cahoone and met with considerable critical acclaim. The latter was named one of the 50 Best Albums of 2023 by NPR Music and nominated for International Album of the Year at the 2024 UK Americana Music Awards.

On August 6, 2026, Cilker announced her third album, Little White Cross, to release October 9, 2026. She recorded it in Lockhart, Texas with producer Bruce Robison.

== Biography ==
Cilker was born c. 1993, in California, and raised in the Santa Clara Valley. She later moved with her husband to a ranch in eastern Oregon and then to Goldendale, Washington. During the COVID-19 lockdowns, she worked on her ranch with her husband, at time performing at local live shows.

Cilker released her Sera Cahoone-produced debut album Pohorylle via Portland, Oregon label Fluff & Gravy Records, on November 5, 2021. According to Metacritic, the album received an average score of 84/100, reaching "universal acclaim." Stereogum named it the 5th Best Country Album of 2021, and Pitchfork gave it a 7.7 out of 10 rating, saying, "Cilker recorded these songs far from the country mainstream, which allows her to put her own stamp on the music."

Cilker's second album, Valley of Heart's Delight, was also produced by Cahoone and released on September 15, 2023 via Fluff & Gravy. It was named one of the 50 Best Albums of 2023 by NPR Music and included among the Best Country Albums of 2023 by Rolling Stone, Bandcamp Daily, Stereogum, and Paste Magazine. It was also nominated for International Album of the Year at the 2024 UK Americana Music Awards and named one of the 75 Best Albums of 2023 by both Mojo and Uncut. American Songwriter wrote, "Cilker proves herself to be one of our finest and most literate songwriters, one whose physical and psychological distance from the pressures of Nashville seems to be at least partially tied to her artistic triumphs.”

In early 2026, Cilker and fellow musician Avery Hellman (aka ISMAY) launched independent record label Fossil Records, focused on writers and artists from the American West.

On August 6, 2026, Cilker announced her third album, Little White Cross, which released on October 9, 2026 via Fossil Records. She recorded it at The Bunker in Lockhart, Texas with producer Bruce Robison.
