= Valley of Heart's Delight =

Studio album by Margo Cilker
- Released: September 15, 2023
- Genre: Americana
- Length: 37:53
- Label: Fluff & Gravy
- Producer: Sera Cahoone

Margo Cilker chronology
Pohorylle (2021)	Valley of Heart's Delight (2023)

"I wrote these songs surrounded by the wild landscapes of the Northwest, but I was leaning toward the place I'd come from. I felt cut off from my family and the valley that held them. I spent hours thinking about my sense of belonging. I'd traveled through many places and then, when the travel stopped, I ruminated on where I had ended up."

—Cilker on writing songs for Valley of Heart's Delight

Valley of Heart's Delight is a 2023 studio album by American country musician Margo Cilker. The album has received positive reviews from critics and investigates Cilker's childhood growing up in the Santa Clara Valley.

== Reception ==
According to the review aggregator Metacritic, Valley of Heart's Delight received "universal acclaim" based on a weighted average score of 89 out of 100 from 6 critic scores. In American Songwriter, Hal Horowitz gave this album 4 out of 5 stars, noting Cilker's ability to mix music genres and concluding that the album "proves herself to be one of our finest and most literate songwriters". Online retailer Bandcamp chose this among the best country music of September 2023, with Ben Salmon calling Cilker "a stunning songwriting talent". A roundup of notable releases of the week from BrooklynVegan included this release and critic Andrew Sacher writing that Cilker "has an equal knack for time-tested country music traditions and the humble modernity of indie folk, coupled with an envious ability to write songs that you feel like you've known your whole life yet still sound new and fresh". John Moore of Glide Magazine called this work "one of the most compelling albums of the genre so far this year" and "a near flawless exercise in songwriting".

No Depression's Maeri Ferguson wrote that Cilker's discussion of labor and everyday life is delivered with "a voice that manages to convey such emotion, but feels utterly effortless" and concludes that "whether she's making you laugh or cry, she feels like a friend, her songs a warm hand to hold". Writing for The Observer, Neil Spencer stating that "there's a strong streak of nostalgia in the songs" for Cilker's life in California and he rated the album 4 out of 5 stars. In an 8.8 out of 10 review from Matt Mitchell in Paste, this work is declared "a dashing and brilliant leap of Americana" that "sounds like [Cilker]'s got a century's worth of stories to tell"; editors of the magazine chose it as one of the best albums of September 2023. At PopMatters, Steve Horowitz noted the similarities in tone and musicianship with Cilker's last album, stating that there is "a sonic connection to her original record and gives the record a new sound" and notes the strengths of the lyrics, where the singer acts "as a stand-in for all of us"; he scored the album an 8 out of 10. In Rolling Stone, Jonathan Bernstein called this album "a big leap forward" for Cilker while also being a continuation of the work done on Pohorylle. Editors at Stereogum chose this as Album of the Week and critic Chris DeVille calling the music "subtly spectacular results" of Cilker's recording process and he particularly praised her lyrics, calling her "a remarkable lyricist carving out her own space within a grand tradition, always subverting Americana tropes or finding ways to make them feel new". Uncut editor Michael Bonner included this album on his list of the best of the year.

Valley of Heart's Delight in best-of lists
Outlet	Listing	Rank
Bandcamp	The Best Country Music of 2023	—
BrooklynVegan	13 Great Country Albums from 2023	—
Mojo	The 75 Best Albums of 2023	72
NPR Music	The 50 Best Albums of 2023	—
El País	The best music albums of 2023	12
Paste	The 30 Best Country, Folk, and Americana Albums of 2023	—
Qobuz	The Best Albums of 2023	—
Rolling Stone	Best Country and Americana Albums of 2023	—
Stereogum	Best Country Albums Of 2023 (Marissa R. Moss)	4
Uncut	The 75 Best Albums of 2023	15

Valley of Heart's Delight was nominated for International Album of the Year at the UK Americana Music Awards.

== Track listing ==
All songs written by Margo Cilker, except where noted.

1. "Lowland Trail" – 2:24
2. "Keep It on a Burner" – 4:27
3. "I Remember Carolina" (Margo Cilker and Forrest VanTuyl) – 4:54
4. "Beggar for Your Love" – 3:27
5. "Mother Told Her Mother Told Me" – 3:56
6. "With the Middle" – 3:27
7. "Santa Rosa" – 2:30
8. "Crazy or Died" – 3:14
9. "Steelhead Trout" (Ben Walden) – 2:22
10. "Sound & Fury" (Cilker and VanTuyl) – 3:34
11. "All Tied Together" (Cilker and VanTuyl) – 3:35

== Personnel ==
- Margo Cilker – guitars, lead vocals
- John Morgan Askew – banjo, recording, mixing at Bocce
- Jen Borst – cover photograph
- Paul Brainard – guitars, pedal steel guitar
- Sera Cahoone – drums, vocals, production
- Sarah Cilker – vocals
- Jenny Conlee-Drizos – piano, accordion, organ
- JJ Golden – mastering at Golden Mastering
- Caleb Klauder – mandolin, vocals
- Jared Leake – illustration
- John Morgan Askew – banjo
- Kelly Pratt – horns
- Matt Sharkey – additional photography
- Annie Staninec – violin, viola
- Ben Walden – vocals, harmonica
- Rebecca Young – bass

== See also ==
- 2023 in American music
- List of 2023 albums
