= Gulag Orkestar =

Studio album by Beirut
- Released: May 9, 2006
- Genre: Balkan folk
- Length: 37:25
- Label: Ba Da Bing

Beirut chronology
| Gulag Orkestar (2006) | Lon Gisland (2007) |

Gulag Orkestar is the debut album of Beirut. It was recorded in 2005 in Albuquerque, New Mexico. The Gulag was a Soviet government agency administering criminal justice, while orkestar is the Serbo-Croatian word for "orchestra".

It is written in the booklet that the front and back photos were found in a library in Leipzig, torn out of a book. The original photographer was unknown to the creators of the album while it was recorded, but has since been discovered to be Sergey Chilikov.

== Reception ==
Professional ratings
Aggregate scores
| Source | Rating |
|---|---|
| Metacritic | 80/100 |
Review scores
| Source | Rating |
| AllMusic | 3.5/5 stars |
| Entertainment Weekly | B+ |
| The Guardian | 4/5 stars |
| NME | 8/10 |
| The Observer | 4/5 stars |
| Pitchfork | 7.7/10 |
| Q | 4/5 stars |
| Rolling Stone | 3.5/5 stars |
| Uncut | 3/5 stars |
| The Village Voice | B+ |

The album has received great critical acclaim and was later re-released to include the Lon Gisland EP.

As of 2009, sales in the United States have exceeded 79,000 copies, according to Nielsen SoundScan.

== Track listing ==
Many song titles are named after toponyms in Europe, such as cities, states and neighborhoods. Prenzlauerberg is a locality in Berlin. Brandenburg and Rhineland are geographical areas in Germany. Bratislava is the capital of Slovakia.

All tracks are written by Zach Condon.

| No. | Title | Length |
|---|---|---|
| 1. | "The Gulag Orkestar" | 4:38 |
| 2. | "Prenzlauerberg" | 3:46 |
| 3. | "Brandenburg" | 3:38 |
| 4. | "Postcards from Italy" | 4:17 |
| 5. | "Mount Wroclai (Idle Days)" | 3:15 |
| 6. | "Rhineland (Heartland)" | 3:58 |
| 7. | "Scenic World" | 2:08 |
| 8. | "Bratislava" | 3:17 |
| 9. | "The Bunker" | 3:13 |
| 10. | "The Canals of Our City" | 2:21 |
| 11. | "After the Curtain" | 2:54 |
| Total length: | | 37:25 |

UK Version Bonus CD: Lon Gisland
| No. | Title | Length |
|---|---|---|
| 1. | "Elephant Gun" | 5:48 |
| 2. | "My Family's Role in the World Revolution" | 2:07 |
| 3. | "Scenic World" | 2:53 |
| 4. | "The Long Island Sound" | 1:18 |
| 5. | "Carousels" | 4:23 |
| Total length: | | 16:29 |

- The EP's version of "Scenic World" differs from the first in that it has a slower, stronger sound and is entirely acoustic, with a violin and accordion replacing the original MIDI keyboard.

== Personnel ==
Beirut

- Zach Condon - vocals, trumpet, flugelhorn, ukulele, percussion, mandolin, accordion, organ, piano, recording
- Heather Trost - violin
- Jeremy Barnes - percussion, accordion
- Perrin Cloutier - cello
- Hari Ziznewski - clarinet

Additional personnel

- Alan Douches - mastering
- Josh Clark - recording, mixing
- Ben Goldberg - photography (all but cover and back)
