= Giant (Herman Düne album) =

Studio album by Herman Düne
- Released: October 15, 2006
- Studio: Brynn Derwen Studio, Wales
- Genre: Anti-Folk
- Length: 55:13
- Label: Source Etc.
- Producer: Herman Düne

Herman Düne chronology
| Not on Top (2005) | Giant (2006) | Next Year in Zion (2008) |

Professional ratings
Review scores
| Source | Rating |
|---|---|
| MusicOMH | 4/5 stars |
| This Is Fake DIY | 9/10 stars |
| Drowned in Sound | 8/10 stars |

Giant is a 2006 studio album by Herman Düne.

== Track listing ==
1. "I Wish That I Could See You Soon" – 2:49
2. "Nickel Chrome" – 4:05
3. "1-2-3/Apple Tree" – 3:24
4. "Bristol" – 3:08
5. "Pure Hearts" – 4:03
6. "No Master" 2:54
7. "Take Him Back to New York City" – 6:04
8. "Baby Bigger" – 1:32
9. "This Summer" – 4:20
10. "Your Name/My Game" – 3:59
11. "By the Light of the Moon" – 2:26
12. "When the Water Gets Cold & Freezes on the Lake" – 3:58
13. "Giant" – 4:25
14. "I'd Rather Walk Than Run" – 2:24
15. "Glory of Old" – 4:07
16. "Mrs Bigger" – 1:35

== Personnel ==
- Songwriting, Singing, Guitar: David-Ivar Herman Düne (a.k.a. Ya Ya) & Andre Herman Düne
- Drums And Percussion: Néman Herman Düne
- Bongo-Drums, Percussion: Doctor Lori Schonberg
- Back-Up Female Singing: The Woo-Woos > Featuring Lisa Li-Lund, Angela Carlucci and Crystal Madrilejos (The Babyskins)
- Horns And Brass: The Jon Natchez Bourbon Horns featuring Kelly Pratt
- Bass, Ukulele, Marimba: David-Ivar Herman Düne
- Solo Alto Saxophone: Andre Herman Düne
