= Pohorylle =

Studio album by Margo Cilker
- Released: November 5, 2021
- Genre: Americana
- Length: 31:24
- Labels: Fluff & Gravy
- Producer: Sera Cahoone

Margo Cilker chronology
Songs from My Bucket (2020)	Pohorylle (2021)	Valley of Heart's Delight (2023)

Pohorylle is the 2021 debut full-length album by American country musician Margo Cilker. It received positive reviews from critics.

== Reception ==
According to the review aggregator Metacritic, Pohorylle received "universal acclaim" based on a weighted average score of 84 out of 100 from 4 critic scores. In Glide Magazine, John Moore characterized this release as "a remarkable career starting point, that grows more impressive with each listen". John Mulvey of Mojo gave Pohorylle 4 out of 5 stars, stating that the music initially sounds like straightforward Americana, but as the tracks unfold, Cilker incorporates other influences and "[Cilker]’s not averse to throwing a Dixieland jazz band into the mix", resulting in a "very good" debut. In No Depression, Maeri Ferguson called Pohorylle "profound" for displaying Cilker's self-exploration in the lyrics and various "sonic capabilities" that have "the prettiest shimmery melodies". Writing for Pitchfork, Stephen M. Deusner rated Pohorylle a 7.7 out of 10, opining that Cilker wrote country music outside of the genre's mainstream, leading it to "conveys a distinct and lively personality".

PopMatters' Steve Horowitz considered this release an exploration of femininity and favorably compares the songwriting to The Band, Bob Dylan, and Joni Mitchell. In a review for Cilker's follow-up Valley of Heart's Delight, Chris DeVille of Stereogum called this album "one of those records that never dredged up a torrential hype storm but became a treasured favorite for many" for presenting "Cilker as a chronicler of the world’s less explored corners, with a knack for smart, funny wordplay and a musical style that blurred the lines between country and folk-rock". That site also chose this as the fifth best country album of 2021 with "so much unexpected joy and wit", where "Cilker nudges her delivery from matter of fact to a soft warble, drawing you along in conversation, a bunch of songs for the road we’re all trying desperately to navigate". In Uncut, Rob Hughes scored this album 4 out of 5 stars, highlighting several individual tracks for being "awash with grace, wisdom and allusive wordplay".

In a 2022 review of a live performance by Cilker, Kitty Empire called Pohorylle "a flawless gem of a record that provided instant succour and the promise of more expansive times to come".

== Track listing ==
1. "That River" – 3:09
2. "Kevin Johnson" – 3:24
3. "Broken Arm in Oregon" – 3:47
4. "Flood Plain" – 3:26
5. "Tehachapi" – 3:07
6. "Barbed Wire (Belly Crawl)" – 2:44
7. "Chester's" – 3:37
8. "Brother, Taxman, Preacher" – 2:36
9. "Wine in the World" – 5:34

== Personnel ==
- Margo Cilker – guitar, vocals
- John Morgan Askew – instrumentation, engineering, mixed
- Sera Cahoone – production
- Sarah Cilker – harmony vocals
- Jenny Conlee – keyboards
- JJ Golden – mastering at Bocce, Vancouver, Washington, United States
- Jason Kardong – pedal steel guitar
- Mirabai Peart – strings
- Kelly Pratt – horns
- Rebecca Young – bass

== See also ==
- 2021 in American music
- List of 2021 albums
