= Sévignacq-Meyracq =

- Commune
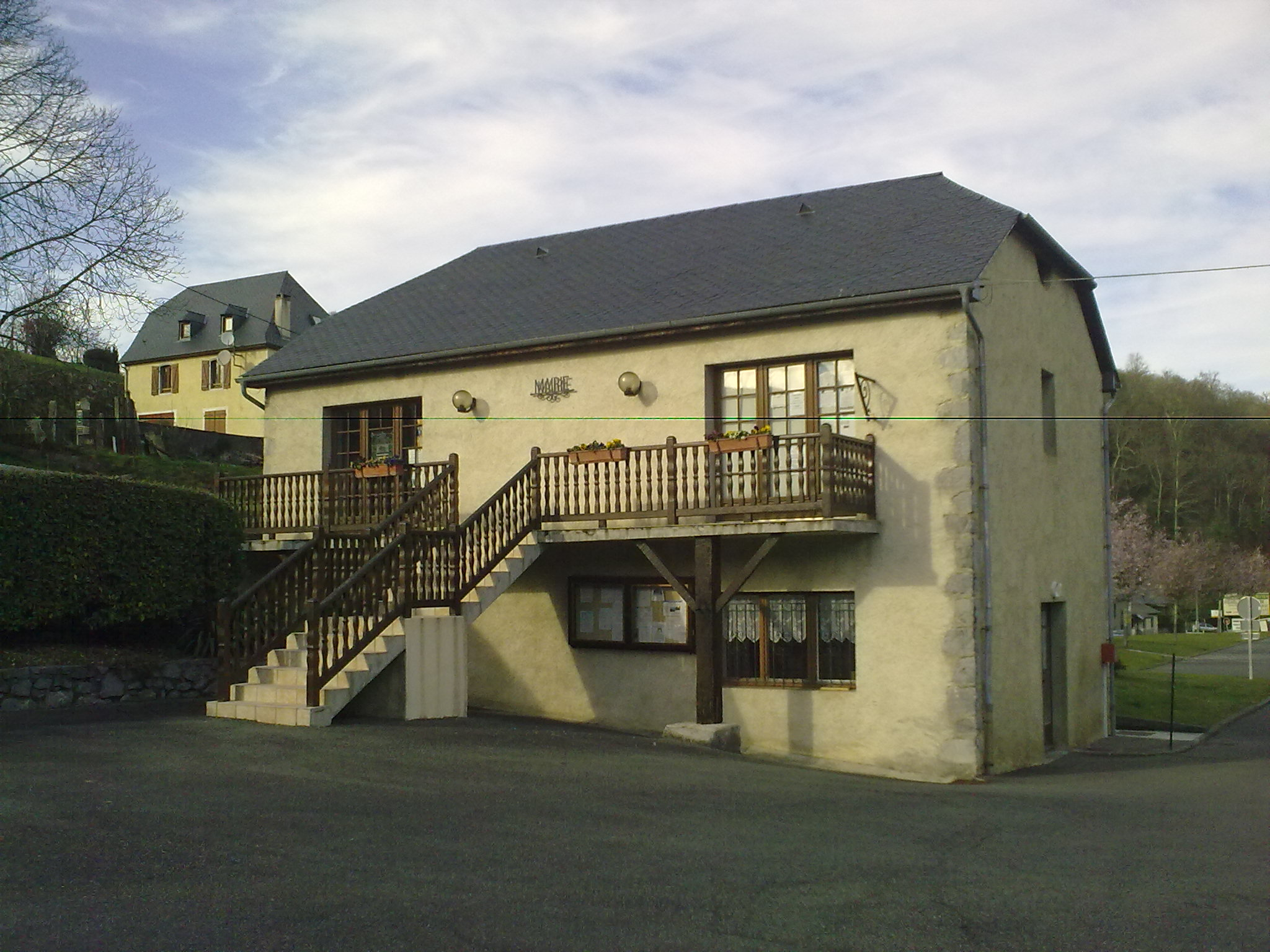
- Town Hall

- Coat of arms
- Location of Sévignacq-Meyracq
- Location within France Location within Nouvelle-Aquitaine
- Coordinates: 43°06′51″N 0°24′39″W
- Country: France
- Region: Nouvelle-Aquitaine
- Department: Pyrénées-Atlantiques
- Arrondissement: Oloron-Sainte-Marie
- Canton: Oloron-Sainte-Marie-2
- Intercommunality: Vallée d'Ossau

Government
  - Mayor (2020–2026): Monique Moulat
- Area^{1}: 14.81 km^{2} (5.72 sq mi)
- Elevation: 454 m (1,490 ft)
- Highest elevation: 618 m (2,028 ft)
- Lowest elevation: 296 m (971 ft)
- Population (2023): 577
  - Density: 39.0/km^{2} (101/sq mi)
- Time zone: UTC+01:00 (CET)
  - Summer (DST): UTC+02:00 (CEST)
- INSEE/Postal code: 64522 /64260
- ^{1} French Land Register data, which excludes lakes, ponds, glaciers > 1 km^{2} (0.386 sq mi or 247 acres) and river estuaries.

Sévignacq-Meyracq (French pronunciation: [seviɲak meʁak]; Occitan: Sevinhac e Meirac) is a commune in the Pyrénées-Atlantiques department in south-western France.

== See also ==
- Ossau Valley
- Communes of the Pyrénées-Atlantiques department
