= Elephant Gun (EP) =

EP by Beirut
- Released: June 25, 2007
- Genre: Indie folk
- Length: 13.35
- Label: 4AD

Beirut chronology
Pompeii (2007)	Elephant Gun (2007)	The Flying Club Cup (2007)

Elephant Gun is an EP by Beirut, released in 2007. The title track was originally released on Lon Gisland.

== Track listing ==
All tracks are written by Zach Condon, except where noted.

No.	Title	Writer(s)	Length
1.	"Elephant Gun"		5:49
2.	"Transatlantique"		3:36
3.	"Le moribond/My Family's Role in the World Revolution"	Jacques Brel; Zach Condon	4:10

Track 3 was recorded during a KEXP Radio Session live at the Austin City Limits on March 16, 2007.

Released by 4AD Records, on June 25, 2007, Catalog Number AD 2729. Also available on promo CD, with a full-art cardboard slip-case. Artwork for both by Jon Wozencroft.

== Music video ==
Still From "Elephant Gun" video, photo by: Kristianna Smith

A music video was made for the track "Elephant Gun." The video was directed by Alma Har'el.

On working with Zach Condon, Har'el writes, "That sound is how I feel when I'm honest about my life, that juxtaposition of melancholy and loneliness with the absolute enjoyment and happiness of being alive."

The choreography is by Paula Present.

The video was named one of the top 50 videos of 2007 by Pitchfork, while Paste ranked it the 30th best music video from 2000 to 2009.
