= Lon Gisland =

Lon Gisland EP

EP by Beirut
- Released: January 30, 2007
- Genre: Indie folk
- Length: 16:29
- Label: Ba Da Bing

Beirut chronology
Gulag Orkestar (2006)	Lon Gisland EP (2007)	Pompeii (2007)

Lon Gisland is an EP by Beirut, released on CD by Ba Da Bing! Records in January 2007 and on single-sided 12" LP by Chouette Records.

It is a follow-up to the critically acclaimed Gulag Orkestar and the first album performed by the full band, which came together after Gulag Orkestar's release. Lon Gisland includes a reworked version of "Scenic World", from Beirut's previous album. The EP’s title does not refer to a person named Lon Gisland, but is instead a play on the place-name “Long Island.”

== Reception ==
Professional ratings
Review scores
Source	Rating
Pitchfork	7.8/10
Rolling Stone	3.5/5 stars
Tiny Mix Tapes	3/5 stars

Pitchfork's Brandon Stosuy gave Lon Gisland a positive review, calling Condon's decision to play with a full band a "smart move". Stosuy ended his review by writing: "It seems Condon's getting all this-- by embracing the developments, he's started to go beyond chewing the scenery to, well, actually living in it".

== Track listing ==
All tracks are written by Zach Condon.

No.	Title	Length
1.	"Elephant Gun"	5:48
2.	"My Family's Role in the World Revolution"	2:07
3.	"Scenic World"	2:53
4.	"The Long Island Sound"	1:18
5.	"Carousels"	4:23

- The EP's version of "Scenic World" differs from the first in that it has a slower, stronger sound and is entirely acoustic, with a violin and accordion replacing the original MIDI keyboard.

== Personnel ==
The following people contributed to Lon Gisland:

Beirut

- Perrin Cloutier - Accordion, Cello
- Ryan Condon - Composer
- Zach Condon - Composer, Mixing, Piano, Trumpet, Ukulele, Vocals
- Kristin Ferebee - Violin
- Jon Natchez - Clarinet, Glockenspiel, Sax (Baritone), Ukulele
- Nick Petree - Percussion
- Kelly Pratt - Euphonium, Flugelhorn, Trumpet

Additional personnel

- Rob Carmichael - Design, Layout Design
- Josh Clark - Engineer
- Paul Johnson - Mixing
- Adam Nunn - Mastering

== Charts ==
Chart (2007)	Peak position
US Top Heatseekers	37
