= Dance Party in the Balkans =

Studio album by Alaska in Winter
- Released: 2007
- Genre: Electronic
- Length: 45:40
- Label: Regular Beat Recording Co. (Europe), Milan Records (US)
- Producer: Brandon Bethancourt

Professional ratings
Review scores
Source	Rating
Pitchfork Media	(7.6/10)
Allmusic	3.5/5 stars

Dance Party in the Balkans is the debut album of the American electronic band Alaska in Winter, released in 2007.

== Track listing ==
1. "The Homeless and the Hummingbirds" – 2:57
2. "Your Red Dress (Wedding Song At Cemetery)" – 2:50
3. "The beautiful burial flowers we will never see" – 3:03
4. "Balkan Lowrider Anthem" – 2:23
5. "Lovely Love Love" – 3:23
6. "Twenty Four Hours in Lake of Ice" – 3:30
7. "Dance Party in the Balkans" – 2:45
8. "Harmonijak" – 2:59
9. "Staring At The Sun" – 3:36
10. "Horsey Horse" – 3:17
11. "Rain on Every Weekend" - 5:44
12. "Don't Read Dostoyevsky" - 3:47
13. "Close Your Eyes - We Are Blind" - 5:26
