= Beirut (band) =

American folk band

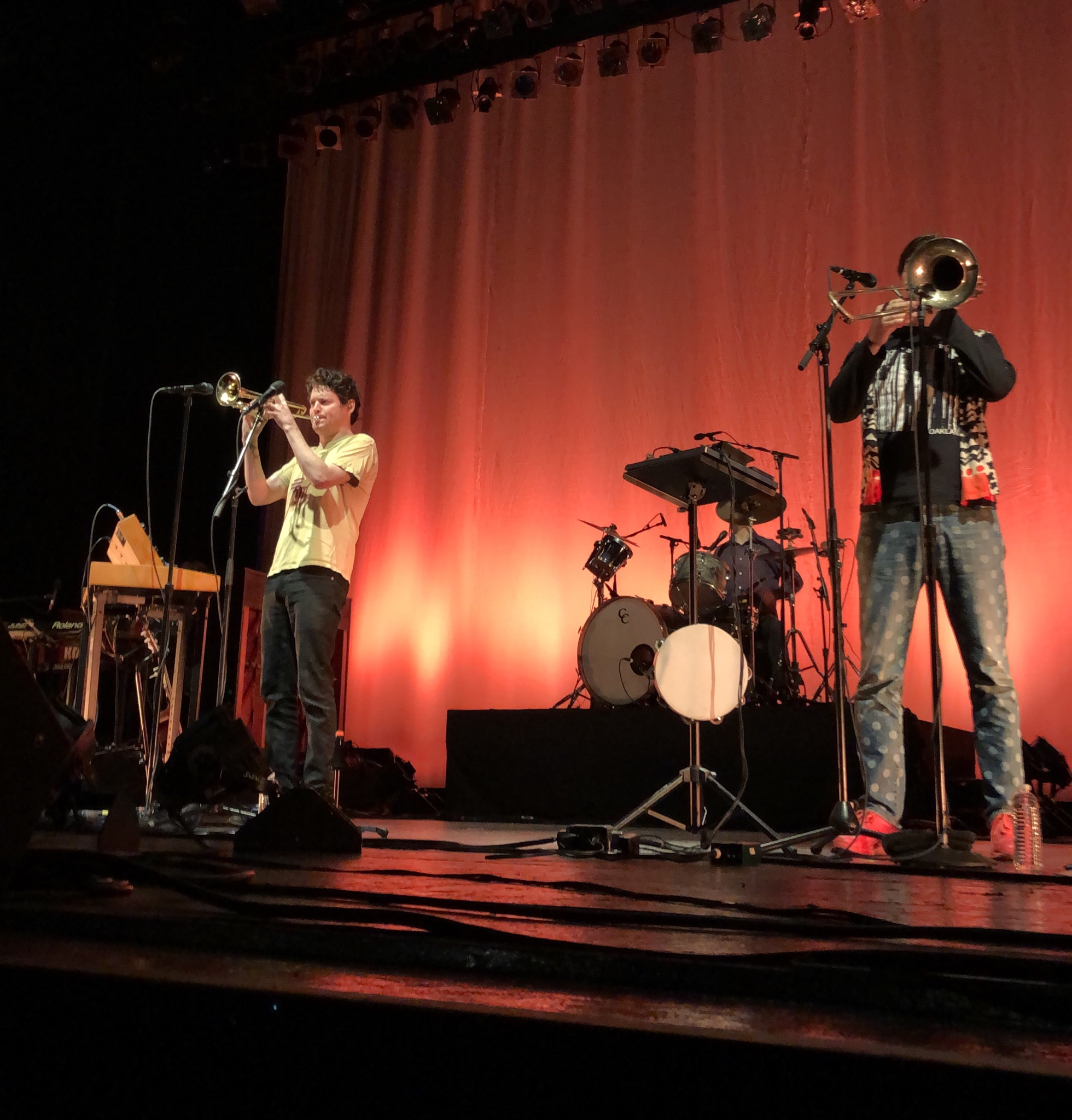
- Beirut performing at The Wiltern Theatre in Los Angeles in 2019

Background information
- Origin: Santa Fe, New Mexico, U.S.
- Genres: Balkan folk; world; indie folk; electronica; baroque pop
- Years active: 2006–present
- Labels: Ba Da Bing; Pompeii; Arts & Crafts México; 4AD
- Members: Zach Condon; Nick Petree; Paul Collins; Kyle Resnick; Ben Lanz; Aaron Arntz
- Past members: Jeremy Barnes; Heather Trost; Jason Poranski; Kristin Ferebee; Jon Natchez; Tracy Pratt; Greg Paulus; Jared van Fleet; Kelly Pratt; Perrin Cloutier
- Website: www.beirutband.com

Beirut is an American indie folk project formed in Santa Fe, New Mexico, in 2006, by singer, songwriter and multi-instrumentalist Zach Condon, who is the band's primary recording artist and sole constant member. In the studio and during live performances, Condon is joined by a rotating line-up of musicians which regularly includes: Nick Petree (drums), Paul Collins (bass), Kyle Resnick (trumpet), Ben Lanz (trombone) and Aaron Arntz (piano, keyboards).

Named after Lebanon's capital, due to the city's history of conflict and as a place where cultures collide, Beirut's music combines elements of indie rock, Balkan folk and world music.

Beirut has released seven studio albums and four EPs, to date. The band's first performance with the full brass section was in New York, in May 2006, in support of their debut album Gulag Orkestar, though they performed their first show with Condon, Petree, and Collins at the College of Santa Fe earlier that year.

== History ==
=== Early years ===
Zach Condon was born in Santa Fe, New Mexico, on February 13, 1986. He grew up in Newport News, Virginia, and Santa Fe. Condon played trumpet in a jazz band as a teenager and cites jazz as a major influence.

Condon attended Santa Fe High School, until dropping out when he was 17. Working at a cinema showing international films piqued his interest in Fellini arias, Sicilian funeral brass, and Balkan music.

Condon attended community college for a short period, then traveled to Europe at the age of 17 with his older brother, Ryan. Condon's exploration of world music developed Beirut's melodic sound. Zach's younger brother Ross Condon played in the band Total Slacker.

=== Gulag Orkestar ===
Returning from Europe, Condon enrolled at the University of New Mexico, where he studied Portuguese and photography. Condon recorded most of the material for Gulag Orkestar alone in his bedroom, finishing the album in a studio with Jeremy Barnes (Neutral Milk Hotel, A Hawk and a Hacksaw) and Heather Trost (A Hawk and a Hacksaw), who became early contributors to the band.

Ba Da Bing Records signed Condon on the strength of the recordings. Condon recruited friends to play Gulag Orkestar's first live shows in New York in May 2006.

Beirut's first music video was for "Elephant Gun," directed by Alma Har'el, who also directed the band's second video "Postcards from Italy." Lon Gisland was the full band's first release in 2007.

In a review on Pitchfork, Brandon Stosuy called the album "an impressive and precocious debut."

=== The Flying Club Cup ===
Beirut's second album, The Flying Club Cup, was recorded largely at a makeshift studio in Albuquerque and completed at Arcade Fire's studio in Quebec. The music on the album has a French influence due to Condon's interest in French chanson during its recording. Condon has cited Francophone singers Jacques Brel, Serge Gainsbourg, and Yves Montand as influences. He also expressed interest in French film and culture, claiming this was his original reason for traveling to Europe. The Flying Club Cup was officially released in October 2007. In September 2007 they did a Take-Away Show acoustic video session shot by Vincent Moon. The DVD Cheap Magic Inside was shot but quickly sold out; in December 2010, Beirut, Ba Da Bing, and La Blogothèque authorized its dissemination via digital download.

The Flying Club Cup has a score of 80 on Metacritic, meaning it has received generally favorable reviews.

=== March of the Zapotec ===
On April 3, 2008, Beirut canceled a previously announced summer European tour. Already in 2006, Beirut canceled the European leg of the tour due in the fall because after two months of the US tour, Condon stated that he was exhausted. Condon explained the cancellations in a post on the official Beirut website, stating that he wanted to put the effort into ensuring that any shows would be "as good as humanly possible". In January 2009 the double EP March of the Zapotec/Holland EP was released, containing an official Beirut release based on Condon's recent trip to Oaxaca (March of the Zapotec), and electronic music under the "Realpeople" name (Holland). On February 6, 2009 Beirut made their debut television performance in the United States on the Late Show with David Letterman, performing "A Sunday Smile".

=== The Rip Tide ===
In early June 2011, amid touring the United States, Beirut announced that their newest album, The Rip Tide, which had been recorded the previous winter in upstate New York, was to be released on August 30. The band simultaneously released the single "East Harlem" (first recorded on Live at the Music Hall of Williamsburg), with the B-side "Goshen". The album was recorded, managed, and released under Condon's own Pompeii Records. Reviewers and fellow musicians have noted that, unlike the prior albums which drew heavily on foreign music from Mexico, France, the Balkans, etc., this one has shown Beirut with its own, more pop-oriented sound; saying, "what emerges [on The Rip Tide] is a style that belongs uniquely and distinctly to Beirut, one that has actually been there all along." One reviewer noted that "the Euro influences [of Beirut's previous albums] are still there, but the presiding spirit is old-fashioned American pop." This album also differs from Beirut's previous albums in that the music was recorded as a band playing together rather than laying down individual tracks one at a time, though the lyrics were only added by Condon after all the music had been recorded.

=== No No No ===
On June 1, 2015, Beirut announced their fourth album, No No No, released on September 11, 2015. On the same day, the title track "No No No" was released for streaming. The album was recorded following a period of turmoil in Condon's life, facing a divorce and having been admitted into a hospital in Australia for exhaustion following extensive touring. Beirut also announced a tour for the album.

=== Gallipoli ===
On October 22, 2018, Condon announced Beirut's next album, Gallipoli, released on February 1, 2019. The album is named after the Italian town where Condon wrote the title track. On January 10, 2019, the music video for Beirut's new song "Landslide" was released. On February 9, 2019, Beirut appeared on the "Saturday Sessions" segment of CBS This Morning's Saturday program, playing selections from "Gallipoli."

The inspiration for Gallipoli started with an old Farfisa organ that Condon had shipped to New York from his parents' home in New Mexico. He acquired the organ in high school when a traveling circus left it in the warehouse of his old workplace. The organ had broken keys and functions, but he managed to write most of his first and large parts of his second albums on it. Condon started writing the first songs of Gallipoli on this organ sometime in late 2016 at his home in Brooklyn. As songwriting progressed to the studio, Gabe Wax (the producer of No No No) was brought in to help usher in the particular sonic qualities of Gallipoli, which consisted of pushing every instrument and sound to its "near breaking point" (much as he did years ago with the old, broken Farisa organ), by channeling instruments through broken amplifiers, tape machines and PA systems. Recording commenced in fall 2017, after travels through Europe, at Sudestudio in Guagnano, Italy, with the help of studio owner Stefano Manca. Gallipoli was completed with final vocals, mixing and mastering happening at both Condon's apartment and Vox Ton studios in Berlin, Germany.

=== Artifacts ===
On October 20, 2021, Beirut announced their next album, Artifacts, to be released January 28, 2022, via the release of the single "Fisher Island Sound" on the band's official YouTube channel. The album is a compilation of "collected EPs, singles, B-sides and early work," including a re-release of the Lon Gisland EP. The album was released via Pompeii Records on January 28, 2022.

=== Hadsel ===
On August 30, 2023, Beirut announced their next album, Hadsel, and released the first single "So Many Plans" on the band's official YouTube channel. The album was released via Pompeii Records on November 10, 2023. The album is "named for the Northern Norwegian island where the performer spent time in 2020". In a 4/5 star review in The Guardian Hadsel was described by reviewer Dave Simpson as "a triumphant celebration of life".

== Personnel ==
Condon plays a rotary-valve trumpet and the ukulele as his main instruments. He bought the ukulele as a joke stage prop, but found he liked the sound and was able to play it despite a wrist injury that inhibited him from playing guitar. Condon also plays the piston trumpet, euphonium, mandolin, accordion, various keyboard instruments, and a modified conch shell that appears on The Flying Club Cup.

Live, Beirut's roster generally consists of:

- Zach Condon – trumpet/flugelhorn/ukulele/vocals
- Nick Petree – drums/percussion/melodica
- Paul Collins – electric bass/upright bass
- Kyle Resnick – trumpet
- Ben Lanz – trombone/sousaphone/glockenspiel
- Aaron Arntz – piano/keyboards

Former members

- Kristin Ferebee – violin
- Jason Poranski – guitar/mandolin/ukulele
- Heather Trost – violin/viola
- Jon Natchez – baritone sax/mandolin/glockenspiel/keyboards
- Tracy Pratt – trumpet/euphonium/flugelhorn
- Greg Paulus – trumpet
- Kelly Pratt – trumpet/French horn/glockenspiel/keyboards
- Jared van Fleet – piano
- Perrin Cloutier – accordion/cello
- Sharon Van Etten, who contributes vocals to two tracks on The Rip Tide

The majority of the members of Beirut have performed live as well as appeared on recorded material.

== Side projects ==
=== Realpeople ===
Realpeople is Zach Condon's electronic side-project. It was under this name that Condon made his first (unreleased) album, The Joys of Losing Weight, and the name to which the Holland EP is credited. The Joys of Losing Weight, which was made when Condon was fifteen, has never been released officially, but has been leaked on the internet.

=== 1971 ===
Condon has also released an EP, Small-Time American Bats, under the name "1971". The EP was recorded with his friend Alex Gaziano on guitar and vocals, when they were both around 16 years old (2002). Gaziano is a founding member of Kidcrash, another band from Santa Fe.

=== Soft Landing ===
Soft Landing was a project started by Beirut members Paul Collins (bass) and Perrin Cloutier (accordion) and Mike Lawless. Their eponymous debut album was released on October 12, 2010 on Ba Da Bing records, and has been described as "a pop version of Beirut" and freak-folk, with a heavy emphasis on dance beats and sheer energy.

=== Pompeii Records ===
Pompeii Records is the record label founded in 2009 by Zach Condon in order to give the band and himself full control over their music. The first recordings released on the label were the band's double EP, March of the Zapotec/Holland EP.

=== Kompani Giraff ===
In the spring of 2023, Viktoria Dalborg, director at the Swedish circus Kompani Giraff, asked Beirut to write the music for their next project. The work resulted in the album A Study of Losses.

=== Guest appearances ===
Condon plays the mandolin, trumpet and ukulele on A Hawk and a Hacksaw's album A Hawk and a Hacksaw and the Hun Hangár Ensemble, and trumpet and ukulele on Alaska in Winter's album Dance Party in the Balkans. He appears on Get Him Eat Him's album Arms Down on the song "2×2".

Condon is featured on the song "Found Too Low RMX" by fellow Santa Fe-native Pictureplane and appears on the first and last tracks of the Grizzly Bear EP Friend.

Condon also appeared on The New Pornographers' fifth album Together.

Rock group Blondie's 2011 album Panic of Girls features a ska cover of "A Sunday Smile" on which Condon plays trumpet. He also plays on "Le Bleu".

On the benefit album Red Hot + Rio 2, Beirut performed a cover of the Portuguese-language song "O Leãozinho", written by Brazilian composer and singer Caetano Veloso.

Condon is featured singing on the track "We Are Fine" on indie rocker Sharon Van Etten's 2012 album Tramp.

Condon also contributed to four songs on Mouse on Mars' 2018 album Dimensional People.

== Discography ==
=== Albums ===
==== Studio albums ====
Title	Details	Peak chart positions										Sales	Certifications
Title	Details	US	AUT	BEL (FL)	BEL (WA)	FRA	GER	IRE	NLD	SWI	UK	Sales	Certifications
Gulag Orkestar	Release date: May 9, 2006; Label: Ba Da Bing	—	—	49	—	—	—	—	—	—	—	US: 79,000	
The Flying Club Cup	Release date: October 9, 2007; Label: Ba Da Bing	118	—	3	65	64	—	51	54	94	69	US: 78,000	BRMA: Gold
The Rip Tide	Release date: August 30, 2011; Label: Pompeii	80	20	7	22	42	69	89	28	29	49	US: 93,000	
No No No	Release date: September 11, 2015; Label: 4AD	46	12	8	17	24	38	62	13	38	37		
Gallipoli	Release date: February 1, 2019; Label: 4AD	— (Note: "Gallipoli" did not enter the Billboard 200 chart, but peaked at number 25 on the Album Sales chart.)	10	4	74	75	21	—	36	21	61		
Hadsel	Release date: November 10, 2023; Label: Pompeii	—	40	101	—	—	68	—	—	—	— (Note: Hadsel did not enter the UK Albums Chart, but peaked at number 59 on the UK Albums Sales Chart.)		
A Study of Losses	Release date: April 18, 2025; Label: Pompeii	—	—	78	—	—	79	—	—	97	— (Note: A Study of Losses did not enter the UK Albums Chart, but peaked at number 55 on the UK Albums Sales Chart.)		
"—" denotes a recording that did not chart or was not released in that territory.

==== Compilation albums ====
Title	Details	Peak chart positions				
Title	Details	AUT	BEL (FL)	GER	UK Sales	UK Indie
Artifacts	Release date: January 28, 2022; Label: Pompeii	71	90	69	80	27

=== EPs ===
Title	Details	Peak chart positions									
Title	Details	US	AUT	BEL (FL)	BEL (WA)	FRA	NLD	SWI	SCO	UK	UK Indie
Lon Gisland	Release date: January 30, 2007; Label: Ba Da Bing	— (Note: Lon Gisland did not enter the US Billboard 200, but peaked at number 37 on the Heatseekers Albums chart.)	—	—	—	—	—	—	—	—	—
Pompeii	Release date: April 24, 2007; Label: Ba Da Bing	—	—	—	—	—	—	—	—	—	—
Elephant Gun	Release date: June 25, 2007; Label: 4AD	—	—	—	—	—	—	—	—	—	30
March of the Zapotec/Holland	Release date: February 17, 2009; Label: Pompeii	87	71	11	68	14	93	75	80	101	7
"—" denotes a recording that did not chart or was not released in that territory.

=== Singles ===
Title	Year	Peak chart positions								Album
Title	Year	US AAA	BEL (FL)	BEL (WA)	MEX Ing.	POL	SCO	UK	UK Indie	Album
"Postcards from Italy"	2006	—	—	—	—	4	—	—	—	Gulag Orkestar
"The Guns of Brixton" / "Interior of a Dutch House" (split single with Calexico)	2006	—	—	—	—	—	93	177	—	Non-album single
"Nantes"	2007	—	6	— (Note: "Nantes" did not enter the Wallonie Ultratop 50, but peaked at 22 on the Ultratip chart.)	—	8	—	—	—	The Flying Club Cup
"Cliquot"	2007	—	—	—	—	12	—	—	—	The Flying Club Cup
"Elephant Gun"	2007	—	—	—	—	—	—	—	30	Elephant Gun
"A Sunday Smile"	2008	—	— (Note: "A Sunday Smile" did not enter the Flanders Ultratop 50, but peaked at 12 on the Ultratip chart.)	—	—	—	—	—	—	The Flying Club Cup
"La Llorona"	2009	—	—	—	—	41	—	—	—	March of the Zapotec
"The Concubine"	2009	—	—	—	—	15	—	—	—	Holland
"East Harlem"	2011	—	— (Note: "East Harlem" did not enter the Flanders Ultratop 50, but peaked at 28 on the Ultratip chart.)	—	29	14	—	—	—	The Rip Tide
"Santa Fe"	2011	—	— (Note: "Santa Fe" did not enter the Flanders Ultratop 50, but peaked at two on the Ultratip chart.)	—	27	27	—	—	—	The Rip Tide
"No No No"	2015	22	— (Note: "No No No" did not enter the Flanders Ultratop 50, but peaked at 33 on the Ultratip chart.)	— (Note: "No No No" did not enter the Wallonie Ultratop 50, but peaked at 29 on the Ultratip chart.)	46	33	—	—	—	No No No
"Gibraltar"	2015	—	— (Note: "Gibraltar" did not enter the Flanders Ultratop 50, but peaked at 35 on the Ultratip chart.)	—	—	39	—	—	—	No No No
"Perth"	2016	—	—	—	—	38	—	—	—	No No No
"Gallipoli"	2018	—	— (Note: "Gallipoli" did not enter the Flanders Ultratop 50, but peaked at 15 on the Ultratip chart.)	—	—	60	—	—	—	Gallipoli
"Corfu"	2018	—	—	—	—	—	—	—	—	Gallipoli
"Landslide"	2019	40	— (Note: "Landslide" did not enter the Flanders Ultratop 50, but peaked at 15 on the Ultratip chart.)	— (Note: "Landslide" did not enter the Wallonie Ultratop 50, but charted as an "extra tip" on the Ultratip chart.)	—	—	—	—	—	Gallipoli
"Fisher Island Sound"	2021	—	—	—	—	—	—	—	—	Artifacts
"So Slowly"	2021	—	—	—	—	—	—	—	—	Artifacts
"Fyodor Dormant"	2022	—	—	—	—	—	—	—	—	Artifacts
"So Many Plans"	2023	—	—	—	—	—	—	—	—	Hadsel
"Caspian Tiger"	2024	—	—	—	—	—	—	—	—	A Study of Losses
"Guericke's Unicorn"	2025	—	—	—	—	—	—	—	—	A Study of Losses
"—" denotes a recording that did not chart or was not released in that territory.

=== Compilations ===
- Dark Was the Night – Beirut contributed the song Mimizan to the charity compilation benefiting the Red Hot Organization

Again in 2011, they contributed a cover of Caetano Veloso's song "O Leãozinho" to the Red Hot Organization's most recent charitable album Red Hot+Rio 2. The album is a follow-up to the 1996 Red Hot+Rio. Proceeds from the sales will be donated to raise awareness and money to fight AIDS/HIV and related health and social issues.

=== DVDs ===
- Cheap Magic Inside (2007)
- Beirut: Live at the Music Hall of Williamsburg (2009)
