= Balkan folk music =

Folk music in the Balkans region

Balkan folk music is the traditional folk music within the Balkans region of Europe. In South Slavic languages, folk music is known as narodna muzika (народна музика) or folk muzika (фолк музика) in Bulgarian, Macedonian, and Serbo-Croatian, and alternatively narodna glazba in standard Croatian, and narodna glasba in Slovene. In Albanian it is known as muzikë popullore, and in Romanian and Moldovan as muzică populară. It is known as népzene in Hungarian and türküler in Turkish.

For more information regarding individual nations' folk music see:

- Albanian folk music
- Bosnian folk music
- Bulgarian folk music
- Croatian folk music
- Hungarian folk music
- Macedonian folk music
- Moldovan folk music
- Montenegrin folk music
- Romanian folk music
- Serbian folk music
- Slovenian folk music
