= Jeremy Barnes (musician) =

American musician (born 1976)

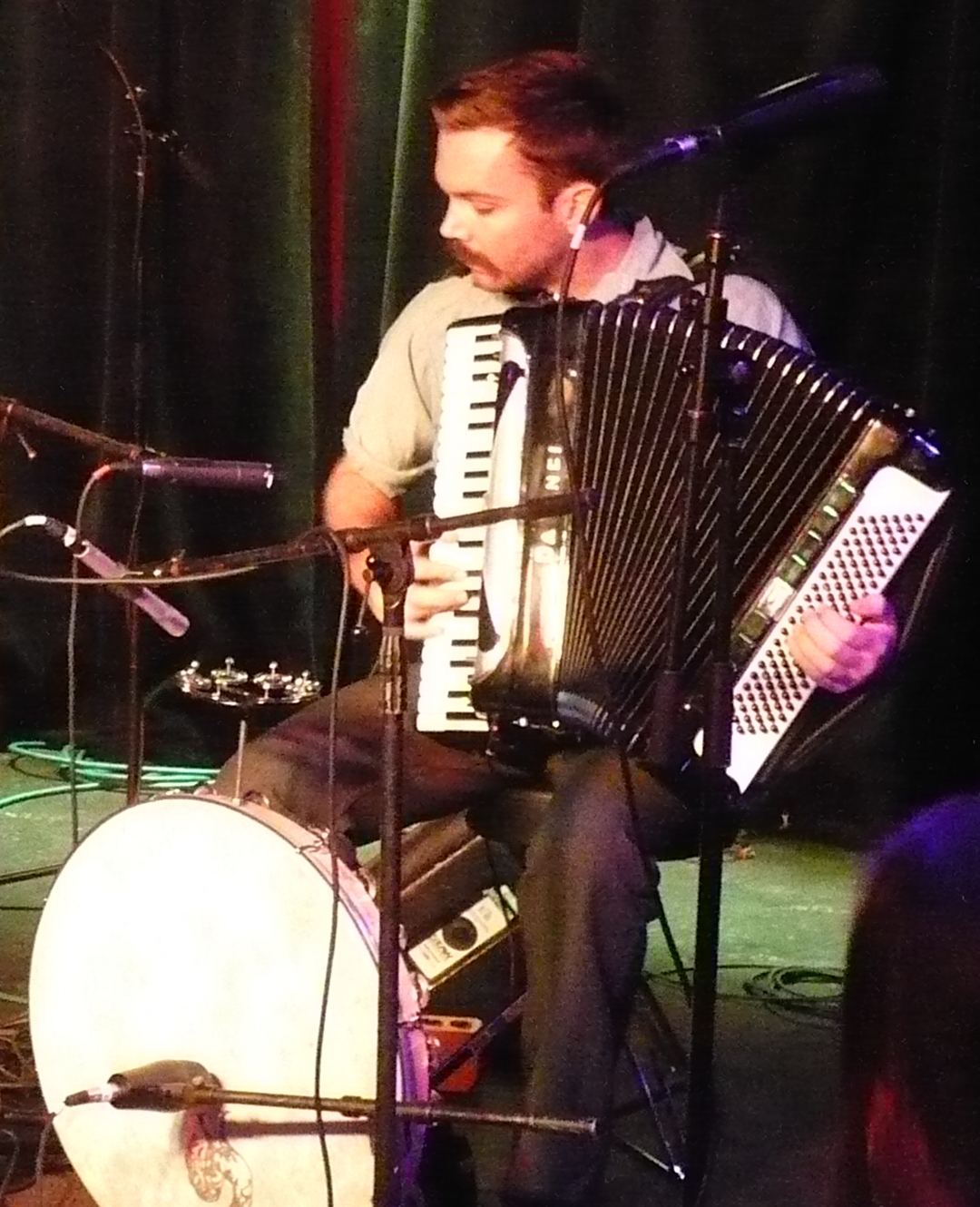
- Barnes in 2009

Background information
- Born: September 18, 1976 (age 49); Albuquerque, New Mexico, United States
- Origin: Albuquerque, New Mexico, USA
- Genres: Folk; Balkan music; mariachi
- Occupations: Accordionist, musician
- Instruments: Accordion, drums, piano, santur, davul
- Years active: 1996–present
- Labels: The Leaf Label, L.M. Duplication

Jeremy Barnes (born September 18, 1976) is an American musician. He plays accordion, percussion and other instruments. He has been a member of the bands Neutral Milk Hotel, Bablicon, Beirut, and A Hawk and a Hacksaw, and is a co-creator of the record label L.M. Duplication. Influences on his work include music from Eastern Europe, Turkey, and the Caucasus.

== Career ==
Barnes was born in Albuquerque, New Mexico, the son of a local businessman. In 1995 he moved to Chicago to attend DePaul University but left his studies in January 1996, aged 19, to join Neutral Milk Hotel, which was a part of the Athens, Georgia-based Elephant 6 music collective. Neutral Milk Hotel disbanded in 1998 and Barnes spent time traveling in Europe and working as a postman. He also played with Broadcast, The Gerbils and Bablicon.

Barnes cites his initial introduction to Eastern European music as having been in 1999 while on tour. After being introduced to Bulgarian music, he lived in a predominantly Ukrainian Chicago neighborhood and developed an interest in Romanian music.

"I was kind of at a dead end in what I was listening to, and it just opened up a whole new world for me," he said in a 2011 interview with Noise Narcs. "That was in 1999. For a while it affected the way I looked at my music, but I was still playing drums in bands, and it didn’t seem like something I should pursue. You go through these fads or trends as a listener, where you’re really into something for a month and then it changes. But with this music, it’s been now twelve years or more, and it gradually seeped into everything that I do."

In 2001 he formed A Hawk and a Hacksaw, in France. In 2005 he met Heather Trost, who performs with him in A Hawk and A Hacksaw. Both Barnes and Trost contributed to the debut album by Beirut, Gulag Orkestar.

A Hawk and A Hacksaw's recording and touring line-up over the years has included Hungarian, Romanian, and English musicians, notably Fanfare Cioclaria, Ferenc Kovacs, Balász Unger, Chris Hladowski, and Kalman Balogh. One recent touring iteration included Chicagoans Samuel Johnson, who played trumpet, and George Lawler on the doumbek.

Barnes and Trost are married and live in Albuquerque. They created the label L.M. Duplication to release their own recordings as well as music by other folk-related groups. Barnes has said he intends to release contemporary music as well as earlier music that is no longer available. They have released home recordings by John Jacob Niles, an album of Turkish wedding music by Cüneyt Sepetçi and Orchestra Dolapdere, and a compilation of music from the Caucasus Mountains, called Mountains of Tongues.

Barnes and Deerhoof guitarist John Dieterich released duo album called The Coral Casino, under the moniker Dieterich & Barnes in 2016. In the same year, Barnes released a collection of solo recordings, called Summer '16.

In Neutral Milk Hotel, Barnes played a four-piece C&C drum kit (24-inch bass drum) Paiste Giant Beat and Istanbul Agop Cymbals, and a Wurlitzer MLM organ. In A Hawk and A Hacksaw, he plays vintage Da Vinci, Dallape and Weltmeister Supita Accordions and the Iranian santur.

== Releases ==
- Excerpts from a Janitor's Almanac (CD) – Self-released – 2001
- A Hawk and a Hacksaw (CD/LP) – Cloud Recordings – 2002
- Darkness at Noon (CD/LP) – The Leaf Label – 2005
- The Way the Wind Blows (CD/LP) – The Leaf Label – 2006
- And the Hun Hangar Ensemble (CD/LP) – The Leaf Label – 2007
- Foni Tu Argile (10" single) – The Leaf Label – 2009
- Délivrance (CD/LP) – The Leaf Label – 2009
- You Have Already Gone to the Other World (CD/LP) – 2013
- Forest Bathing (CD/LP) – 2018

=== Living Music (L.M.) Duplication releases ===
- Cervantine {A Hawk and A Hacksaw} (CD/LP) – L.M. Duplication – 2011
- The Boone-Tolliver Recordings John Jacob Niles (CD/LP) – 2012
- You Have Already Gone to the Other World [A Hawk and A Hacksaw] – 2013
- Bahriye Ciftetellesi [Cüneyt Sepetçi and Orchestra Dolapdere] – 2013
- Mountains of Tongues- Musical Dialects of the Caucasus – 2013
- Bahto Delo Delo- Tsagoi – 2014
- Dieterich & Barnes- The Coral Casino- 2016
- Thor & Friends -s/t – 2016
- Convertino~Amor - The Western Suite & Siesta Songs – 2016
