= Heather Trost =

American violinist and singer (born 1982)

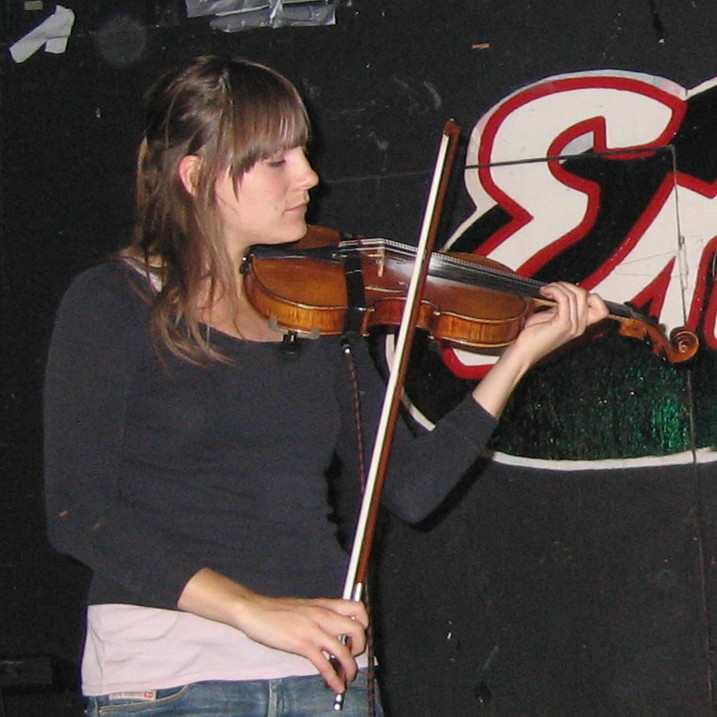
Heather Trost, performing with A Hawk and a Hacksaw in 2006.

Heather Trost (born July 18, 1982) is an American violinist and singer.

== Biography ==
Trost was born in Albuquerque, New Mexico, and is one of the two members of the American Balkan Folk band A Hawk and a Hacksaw, with husband Jeremy Barnes (of Neutral Milk Hotel).

Trost and Barnes also worked together in the band Beirut, having been recruited by Zach Condon to help him complete the recording of his first album Gulag Orkestar (2006).

She is a former member of the band FOMA.

== Discography ==
=== Solo ===
- Ouroboros (Cimiotti Recordings, 2015)
- Agistri (2017)
- Petrichor (2020)
- Desert Flowers (2022)

=== A Hawk and a Hacksaw ===
- Darkness at Noon (2005) – Violin, Vocals
- The Way the Wind Blows (2006) – Viola, Violin
- A Hawk and a Hacksaw and the Hun Hangár Ensemble (2007) – Viola, Violin, Cello
- Délivrance (2009) – Viola, Violin, Accordion, Vocals
- Cervantine (2011) – Viola, Violin
- You Have Already Gone to the Other World (2013)
- Forest Bathing (2018)

=== FOMA ===
- Icecaves (2004)
- Phobos (2006)

=== Other artists ===
- Beirut : Gulag Orkestar (2006) – Violin
- Beirut : The Flying Club Cup (2007) – Viola, Violin
- Benjamin Wetherill : Laura (2008) – Violin, Viola
- Josephine Foster : Bloodrushing (2012)
- Thor & Friends : Thor & Friends (2016)
- Thor & Friends : The Subversive Nature of Kindness (2017)
- Swans : Leaving Meaning (2019)
