= National Press Club (Australia) =

Press club in Australia

Coordinates: 35°18′38.9″S 149°8′0.8″E

National Press Club of Australia
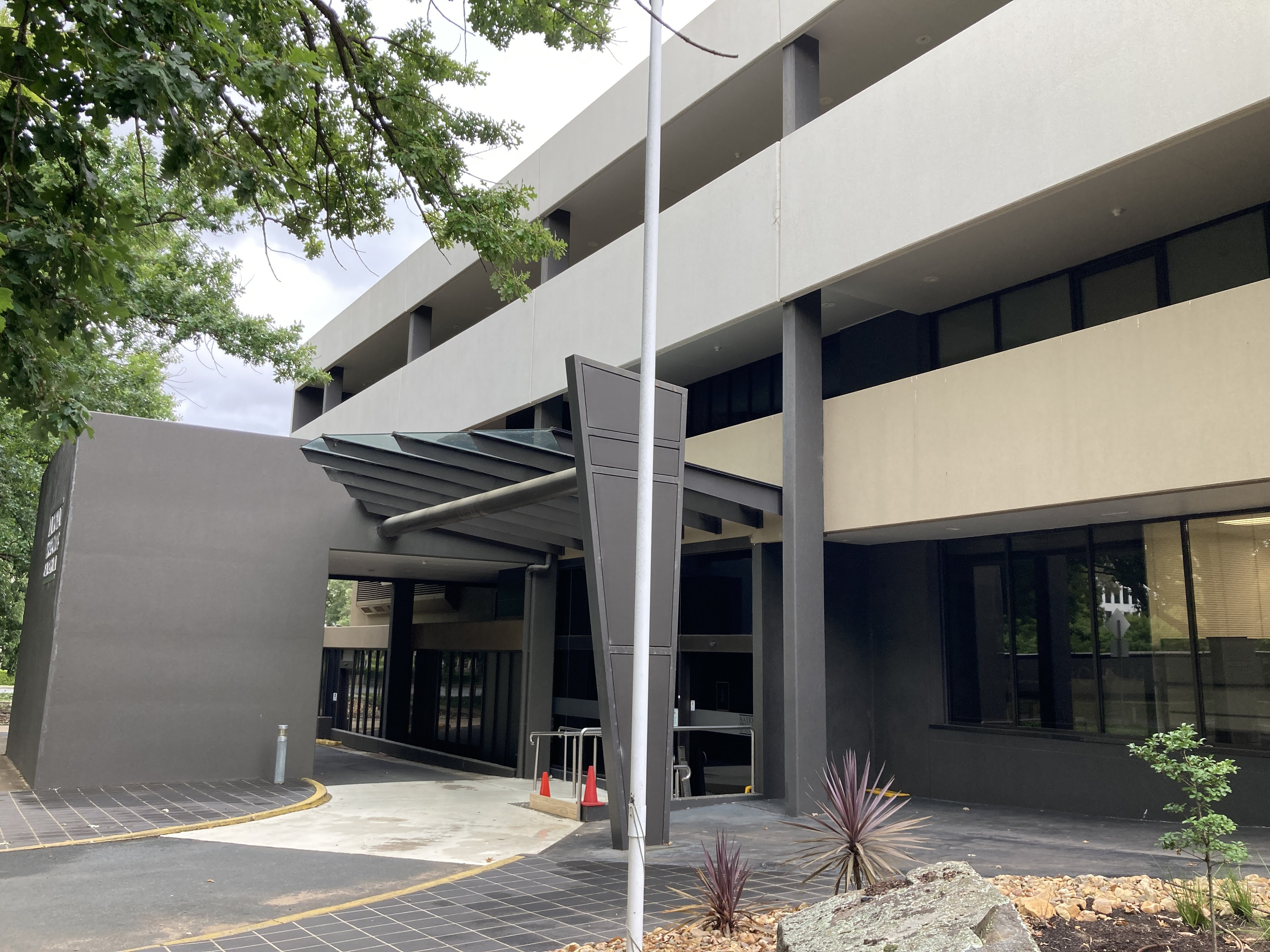
- Formation: 1963
- Founder: Canberra Press Gallery; Australian Journalists Association
- Headquarters: 16 National Circuit, Barton, ACT 2600
- Origins: National Press Luncheon Club (Note: Known as the National Press Luncheon Club from 1963 to 1968)
- President: Tom Connell (Sky News Australia)
- Vice President: Misha Schubert (Science & Technology Australia)
- Treasurer: Greg Jennett (ABC News)
- Chief Executive Officer: Maurice Reilly (Note: Reilly also serves as the Vice President of the International Association of Press Clubs)
- Board of directors: Jane Norman; Anna Henderson; Julie Hare; Andrew Probyn; Gemma Daley; Corrie McLeod
- Affiliations: International Association of Press Clubs
- Website: https://npc.org.au/

The National Press Club is an association of primarily news journalists, but also includes academics, business people and members of the public service, and is based in Canberra, Australia.

== History ==
The National Press Luncheon Club was founded in 1963 by a few journalists with the backing of the Canberra Press Gallery. The founding president was Tony Eggleton. It was renamed the National Press Club in 1968, and established official premises in 1976.

The National Press Club address is a weekly formal speech of approximately one hour, which includes time for questions from members of the press. The president introduces the speaker and moderates the questions. The addresses are broadcast on the ABC Network at 12:30 pm. Guests have included heads of government and ministers of Australia and other countries.

== Notable speeches ==
=== Don Dunstan, 1970 ===
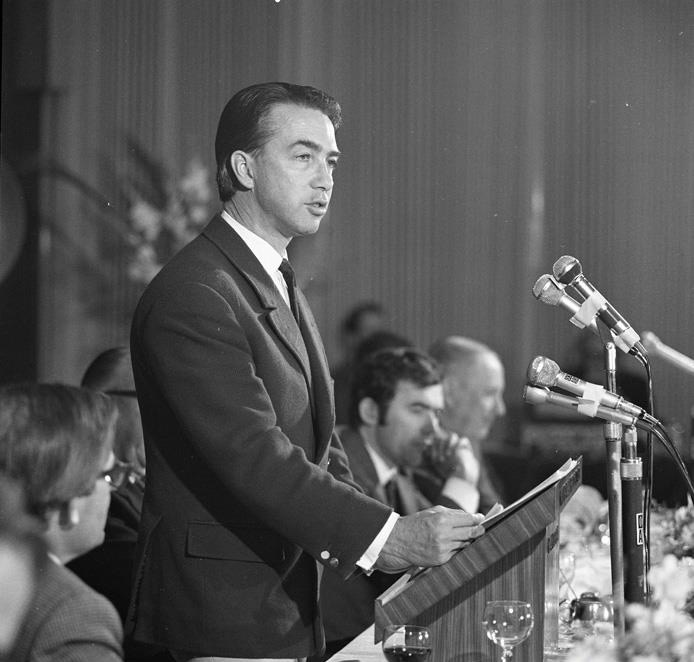
Don Dunstan addressing the National Press Club

Don Dunstan, the newly-elected Premier of South Australia, addressed the National Press Club on 24 June 1970.

=== Germaine Greer, 1972 ===
Germaine Greer addressed the National Press Club on 19 January 1972.

=== Gough Whitlam, 1975 ===
Gough Whitlam spoke at the National Press Club on 10 December 1975. The address was nearly one month after Whitlam had been dismissed from the position of Prime Minister by governor-general John Kerr, with an election having been called for 13 December. In the speech, Whitlam defended his government's reforms and transparency.

=== Bob Hawke, 1983 ===
Federal Opposition Leader Bob Hawke addressed the press club on 2 March 1983, just 3 days before the 1983 Australian federal election.

=== Paul Keating, 1993 ===
Then-Prime Minister Paul Keating made a speech at the National Press Club on 11 March, two days before the 1993 federal election. In the speech, Keating attacked Opposition Leader John Hewson's proposed industrial relations program and economic policy Fightback!, claiming its goods and services tax (GST) would not support jobs and would discourage tourism. He also criticised Hewson for refusing to answer questions or speak to the National Press Club. Keating defended his government's progress on economic reform and integration with Asia and the world.

=== John Howard, 1998 ===
Then-Prime Minister John Howard addressed the National Press Conference on 1 October 1998, which was also two days before that year's federal election. Howard outlined the arguments in favour of the Coalition's taxation reform plan, noted that the government had honoured many commitments made during the 1996 election campaign, and criticised the Labor Party's 1998 election campaign as pessimistic.

=== Grace Tame, 2021 ===
Grace Tame, recipient of the Australian of the Year award, addressed the National Press Club on 3 March 2021. She recounted the sexual abuse she faced from her teacher, her struggles with anorexia, and discussed the importance of a systematic national approach to supporting survivors of sexual assault and adequately addressing predators.

=== Paul Erickson, 2025 ===
As the National Secretary and Campaign Director for the Australian Labor Party, Erickson was invited to address the National Press Club on 21 May 2025, just 18 days following the party's landslide win at the 2025 Australian federal election. The Labor Party recorded their best ever result at a federal election, claiming 94 seats in the 150-seat House of Representatives, the most ever for a single party and on par with the Coalition's 1996 result. The party's national vote of 55.22% two-party-preferred was the highest achieved by any party at a federal election since 1975, and was the first election since 1966 that a returning government had retained every single one of its seats. Erickson had been the National Secretary of the Labor Party since 2019, and had now directed two winning campaigns in a row.

Erickson's address focused on the 2025 campaign strategy employed by Labor, specifically citing their "lethal" advertising campaign and evidence-based approach as key to the party's decisive victory. Following his initial speech, Erickson was queried by News Corporation reporters about what they allege was a "scare campaign" led by Labor against the Coalition. Erickson defending the claim, stating Labor's election ads warning voters opposition leader Peter Dutton would cut health services to pay for its nuclear power policy would “sail through” any truth in political advertising test. All Australian News Corporation papers endorsed the Coalition at the election. Erickson additionally claimed in his address that Peter Dutton had been stuck in a conservative media “echo chamber” and was too quick to fight culture wars and import Donald Trump-style political tactics, and that Labor had the communications and political skills to sell major reform ideas to voters.

=== Hillel Newman, 2026 ===
Israeli Ambassador to Australia Hillel Newman made a National Press Club address on 31 March 2026. His address came after several months after the 2025 Bondi Beach shooting, a terrorist attack targeting Jewish Australians. The social and political turmoil that followed the attack included mass protests against a visit to Australia by Israeli President Isaac Herzog, nationwide marches against the Israeli occupation of Gaza, the announcement by the Albanese government of the Royal Commission on Antisemitism and Social Cohesion and the passage of several pieces of state and federal legislation aimed at curbing antisemitism in Australia. There were several protests against the National Press Club hosting Ambassador Newman for his address, including from prominent journalist Greg Jericho who labelled the Government of Israel a "murderous regime" for the hundreds of journalists killed by the Israeli Defence Force.

Newman's address caused controversy as he voiced support for Israel's contentious new death penalty laws that exclusively target Palestinians. Several days before the address, the Australian government co-signed a statement alongside countries such as the United Kingdom and Germany, urging Israel not to pass the new laws and arguing they were "de facto discriminatory". In the address, Newman also claimed, without providing evidence, that members of a Lebanese television news crew recently killed by an Israeli air strike during their invasion of Lebanon were members of a violent militant group. During his address, the ambassador also refused to issue an apology on behalf of the Israeli government for the unlawful killing of Australian aid worker Zomi Frankcom in Gaza in 2024, despite being queried repeatedly by the Australian journalists in attendance.

=== Pauline Hanson, 2026 ===
Pauline Hanson, leader of the far-right One Nation party, delivered a speech to the National Press Club on 17 June 2026. The speech was Hanson's first address since entering politics in 1996, and followed a rise in support for One Nation in opinion polls. In the speech, Hanson called for Australia to become a monocultural state and claimed multiculturalism is "utterly flawed". Hanson called for industrial relations to be overhauled, abortion to be criminalised after 20 weeks of pregnancy, and radical Islam to be "eradicated". She accused transgender people of "infecting all of society" and likened support for transgender people to radical Islam, and affirmed her commitment to abolishing the National Indigenous Australians Agency. She also reiterated her calls to strip taxpayer funding from public media, including reforming the ABC as a television licence-funded broadcaster and stripping its funding from metropolitan markets, and abolishing the SBS entirely because she viewed it was redundant to the Internet and thus a waste of taxpayer money.

"Undeniably immigration or immigration policy has our country in the state of crisis. At the centre of this crisis is the utterly flawed policy of multiculturalism. We cannot be a multicultural society. We are a multiracial society, but we must be monocultural. Australians must live under the one cultural umbrella."

— Pauline Hanson, National Press Club Address, 17 June 2026

During Hanson's speech, a banner was unfurled behind her, containing a picture of Hanson with text accusing her of opposing pay rises for workers while secretly taking a pay rise. The banner read: "I opposed a pay rise for workers, while I took a $100,000 pay rise for myself!" progressive activist group GetUp! claimed responsibility for the banner; the National Press Club referred the incident to the Australian Federal Police, prompting an investigation.

"But now I want to turn to one very, very important social and cultural issue facing this country. I refer firstly to the transgender insurgency. The transgender ideology has penetrated almost every regulatory authority, and it is supported by the Sex Discrimination Commissioner, Dr Anna Cody, who, in Government, I would sack... We have almost every instrument of Government dedicated to a transgender ideology which seeks to redefine humanity. This whole subversive transgender insurgency must be dismantled."

— Pauline Hanson, National Press Club Address, 17 June 2026

After the address ended, Sarah Martin, a reporter for The Guardian, asked Hanson whether she aided her daughter Lee's appointment as political advisor to a New South Wales Senator. Hanson called Martin a "trashy journalist" in response and claimed that Lee had not been hired due to nepotism. Hanson then told Martin she would be "banned" from questioning.

Hanson's address was unfavourably compared to the far-right in the United States and United Kingdom; noting her attitude towards journalists and hostility to immigrants, Islam, and transgender people, has similarities to Donald Trump and the MAGA movement.

== Journalism awards ==
National Press Club of Australia Journalism Awards
| Award Name | Award Criteria | Notable winners |
|---|---|---|
| Federal Parliamentary Press Gallery Journalist of the Year (formerly Paul Lyneham Award) | "The annual award is for a single story or a body of work, including opinion pieces, showcasing high quality, original journalism. Entries covering federal public policy and national politics are encouraged; however other topical issues are welcome. Restricted to members of the Federal Parliamentary Press Gallery only." | Laura Tingle (2004), Mark Riley (2006), Lenore Taylor (2014), Andrew Probyn (2016, 2024), David Speers (2019) |
| Federal Parliamentary Press Gallery Visual Storyteller of the Year Award | "This award aims to celebrate excellence in photography and camera work by members of the Federal Parliamentary Press Gallery. Restricted to members of the Federal Parliamentary Press Gallery only." | |
| Excellence in Financial Journalism | "Open to employed and freelance media professionals, or writing and production teams, who report on; business and company news, policy analysis and regulatory issues, personal and consumer finance, global and Australian financial markets and/or technology business issues." | Adele Ferguson (2017) |
| Excellence in IT Journalism Award | "The award recognises journalists who have contributed the best work on IT Journalism. Their journalism will have broadened community understanding of IT issues and/or events and explained or examined related policies, technologies, trends and/or personnel in their chosen medium." | |
| Caroline Jones Women in Media Young Journalist's Award | "The Caroline Jones Women in Media Young Journalist’s Award recognises tenacity and passion for the craft of journalism from young women working across rural and regional Australia." | |
| Excellence in Health Journalism Awards | "Their journalism will have broadened community understanding of health issues and/or events and explained or examined related policies, technologies, trends and/or personnel in their chosen medium." | Adele Ferguson (2023) |
| Universities Australia Higher Education Media Awards | "To recognise quality journalism and commentary that informs deeper public understanding of the contribution that universities make to our society and economy." | |
| European Union and Qantas Journalist Award | "The award is open to all Australian journalists who have 3 or more years of experience in the Australian media and can prove that they would benefit from a working visit to the European Union (Brussels and up to 3 European Union Member States). Journalists send in a proposal, supported by their editors, that pitches several reporting pieces focused on European themes of interest to Australian audiences." | |
| German Grant for Journalism | "The German Grant for Journalism encourages Australian Journalists to present Germany-related issues in Australia. The winner will receive full funding to attend the Global Media Forum (GMF) in Bonn, Germany." | James Riley (2022) |
| Wallace Brown Young Journalist Award | "The Wallace Brown Award for the best and fairest early career parliamentary journalist is the only journalism prize which recognises the contribution made by younger members of the Federal Parliamentary Press Gallery." | Patricia Karvelas (2008), Ashleigh Gillon (2011), Annika Smethurst (2016) |

== 2007 federal election leaders' debate controversy ==
On 21 October 2007 a debate between Prime Minister John Howard and Opposition Leader Kevin Rudd was hosted by the National Press Club from the Great Hall of Parliament in Canberra. The debate was televised live by the Australian Broadcasting Corporation, Channel Nine and Sky News. A controversial decision was taken during the debate to interrupt the provision of the live transmission signal to the Channel Nine network because of the inclusion by Channel Nine within its broadcast picture of a real-time line chart of the aggregate studio audience reaction to the debate. This type of chart is referred to as the 'Worm', after the form in which it is rendered and an approximately 'worm-like' movement of the display within the area of the screen in which it appears.

The decision by the National Press Club to interrupt the provision of the live transmission signal to the Channel Nine network has been heavily criticised as contrary to the principles of free speech that are a part of the journalistic tradition. On 22 October 2007, Greens Senator Bob Brown called for a Senate inquiry into the circumstances in which the transmission signal had been cut.

== Gallery ==
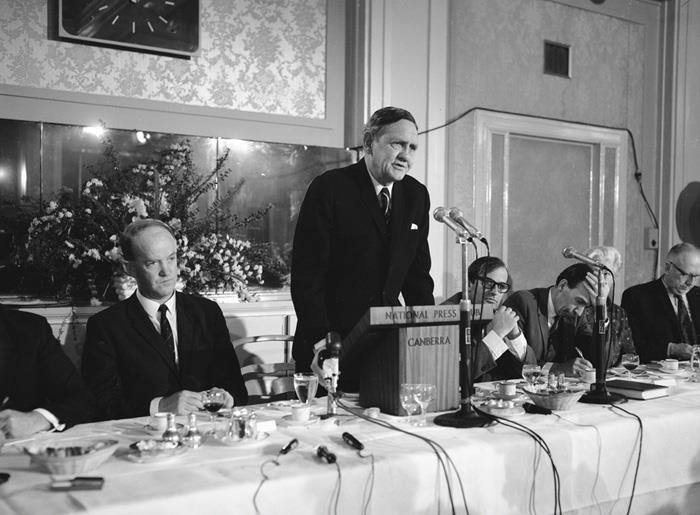
Prime Minister John Gorton giving an address at the National Press Club on 17 October 1969

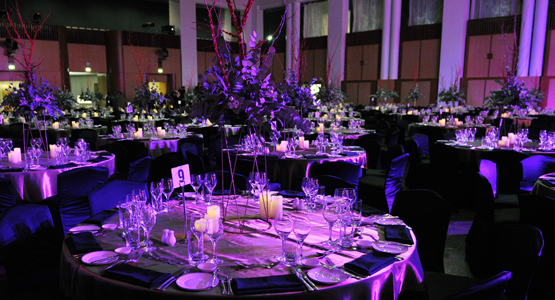
The Great Hall of Parliament House shortly before the 2020 Midwinter Ball

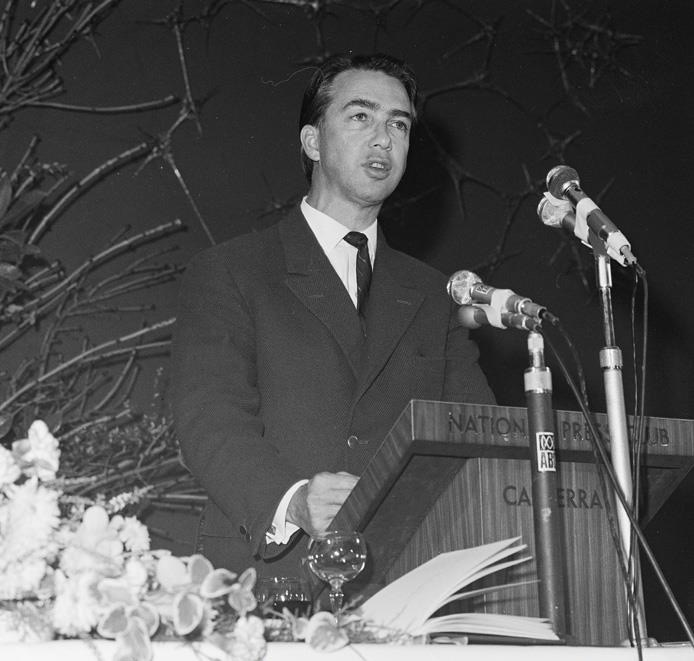
Premier of South Australia Don Dunstan at the National Press Club, 1970

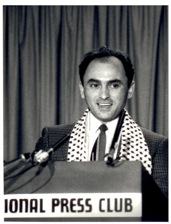
Ali Kazak addressing the National Press Club, 1987

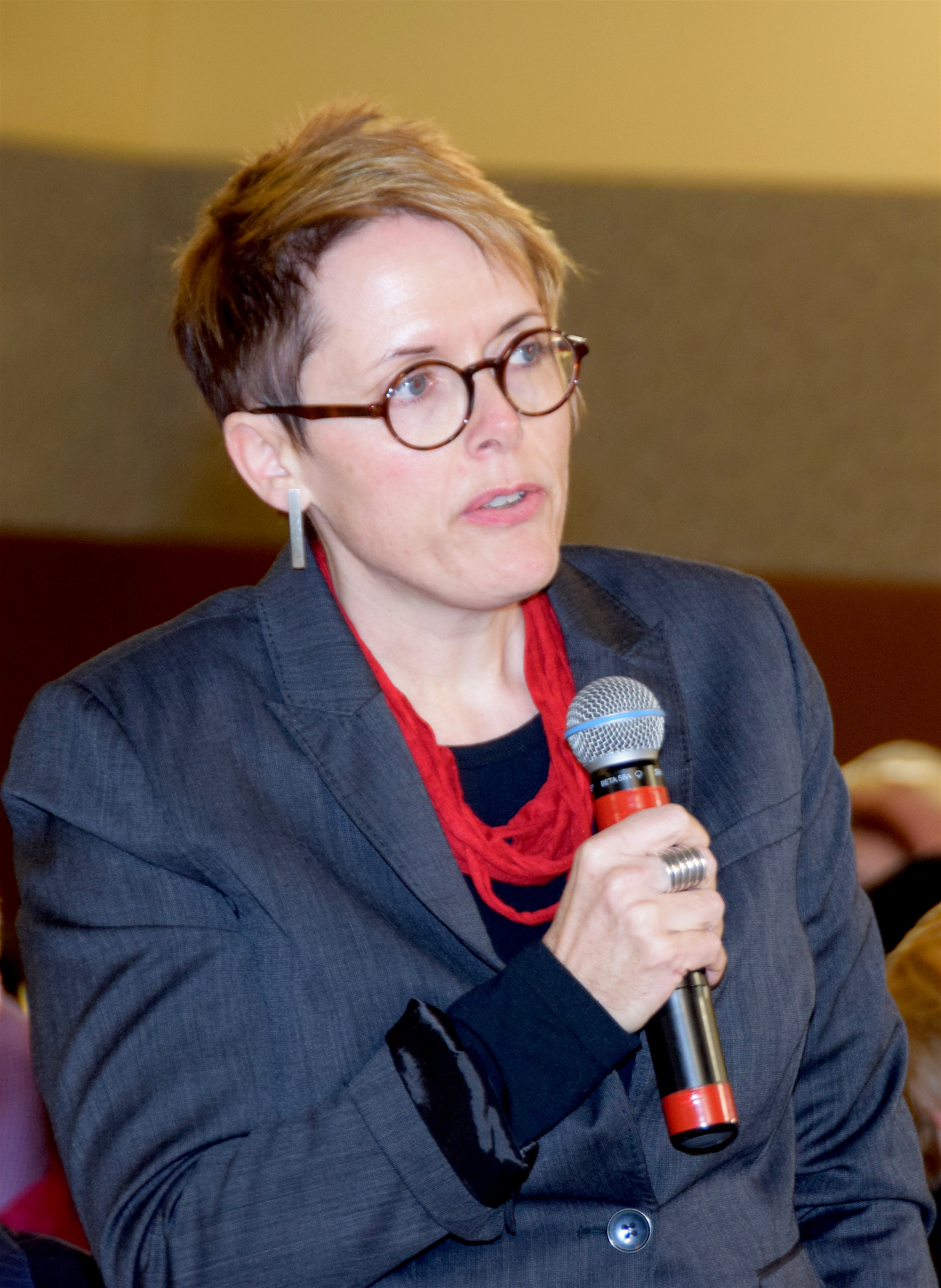
Sabra Lane during Tim Soutphommasane's speech to the National Press Club, 2015

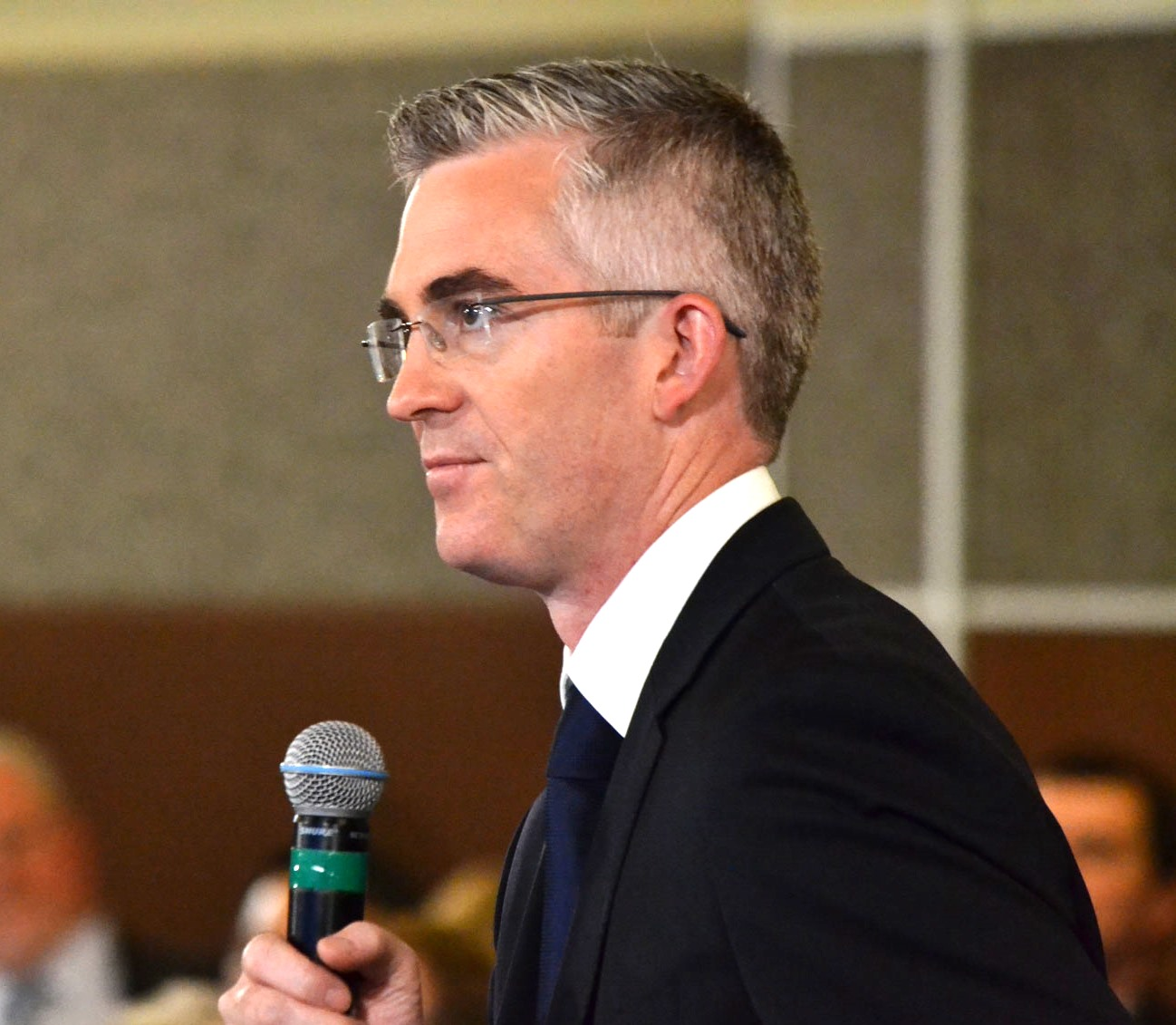
Political editor for Sky News Australia David Speers asking a question during a National Press Club address, 2016

== See also ==
- National Press Club (United States)
- Canberra Press Gallery
- Melbourne Press Club
- Walkley Awards
