= Vesnianky =

Traditional springtime song genre

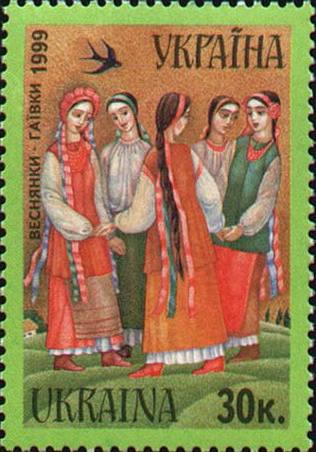
Vesnianka as depicted on a 1999 stamp of Ukraine

Vesnianka (Ukrainian: вecнянкa) (Note: plural - vesnianky (веснянки); also referred to as hahilkа, hailkа, haivkа, yahilkа (in Galicia), rohulkа (in Volhynia), maivky, makivky (in Polesia)) is a type of spring dance songs performed in the lands of present-day Ukraine. While they pre-date Christianity, Christian missionaries altered many of the dances by incorporating Christian themes into the songs and poetry, which accompany the dancing.

== History ==
For the ancient Slavs, the year began in spring, and the March chronology was preserved until 1409 (Nestor the Chronicler began his Tale of Bygone Years based on this chronology). The New Year began with the revival of the surrounding nature and with the awakening of Mother Earth from her winter sleep, with the first plowing and sowing. Spring was greeted joyfully and magnificently, with songs, dances, and games. These songs were called vesnianky.

Later, during the Christian era, as the church fought against paganism and banned any entertainment and secular singing during Lent, in some regions vesnianky were sung during Easter. In the twentieth century, in Western Polissia (Pinshchyna), the ritual of expelling Winter was performed on Easter. In Podillia, apparently because spring was already fully coming into its rights at Easter time, there was no need to call it out at all, so the emphasis of spring rituals shifted to the field of dancing and games.

== Tradition ==
Vesnianky are traditionally sung by young girls. Their performance starts after the feast of Annunciation, although in Galicia the songs are only performed during Easter holidays. The oldest vesnianky are sung in choir and are combined with elements of games and ritual actions, such as calling of birds, commemoration of the dead, plowing and sowing, prophecying weddings etc. The singing usually took place at an elevated open location outside of the village, or on a cemetery. The period when vesnianky were performed ended with Green holidays.

== Musical composition and contents ==
The tunes of vesnianky are characterized by a lively mood, melodic features and a rich variety of rhythms. Vesnianky contain many parallels and similarities to koliadky, which results from the fact, that until the 14th century New Year used to be celebrated in Spring, and to Kupala and Petrivka songs.

The texts of vesnianky are dedicated to a number of topics, including the end of winter and arrival of spring; love, marriage and female beauty; humour and satire; politics and history; serfdom and oppression. Among historical figures mentioned in the songs are princes Roman and Daniel of Galicia, Zaporozhian Cossacks and Jewish arendators.

== In modern culture ==
Elements of vesnianky are present in the works of Ukrainian composers Lesia Dychko, Zhanna Kolodub, Mykhailo Verykivsky, Hryhoriy Veryovka, Valeri Kikta, Mykola Lysenko, Mykola Leontovych, Stanislav Lyudkevych and others. They have also influenced compositions such as The Rite of Spring by Igor Stravinsky, Piano Concerto No.1 by Tchaikovsky and Symphony No.2 in E major by Levko Revutsky.

== Examples ==
- Verbovaya Doshchechka
- Shum

== Links ==
- A modern-day vesnianka performance in Odesa, Ukraine

== See also ==
- Khorovod
- Ukrainian dance
