= Data Garden =

Record label

- Founded: 2011
- Founder: Joe Patitucci, Alex Tyson
- Genre: electronic, experimental, various
- Country of origin: United States of America
- Location: Philadelphia (2011–2017) Los Angeles (2017–present)
- Official website: datagarden.org

Data Garden is an arts organization and independent record label formed by Joe Patitucci and Alex Tyson in 2011.

== Label activity ==
In conjunction with releasing music downloads on plantable artwork, Data Garden has produced installations and events at The Philadelphia Museum of Art, The Noguchi Museum, Institute of Contemporary Art Philadelphia, SXSW Festival, and Bartram's Garden in Philadelphia, among others. Data Garden has received grants from The Pew Center for Arts & Heritage.

In 2014, Data Garden launched the MIDI Sprout, a bio-sonification device. The converter enables musicians to use plants and other living matter as MIDI triggers for electronic music and research. The device was developed with engineer Sam Cusumano and was inspired by the work of Richard Lowenberg, Cleve Backster and Mileece.

== Discography ==
- Alex Tyson, Aquaglass, DG013
- Beep!, Too Physical, DG012
- Telequanta, Metaverse, DG011
- Greg Fox (Guardian Alien, Zs), Mitral Transmission, DG010
- Ben Warfield, Songs of Light & Dust, DG009
- Moan (Shinji Masuko of Boredoms), Bookshelf Sanctuary, DG008
- The Thangs, Wedodo, DG007
- Data Garden, Live at the Switched-On Garden, DG006
- King Britt, The Bee & The Stamen, DG005
- Spaceship Aloha (Christopher Powell of Need New Body, Man Man), Universe Mahalo Vol. #1, DG004
- Data Garden, Quartet: Live at the Philadelphia Museum of Art, DG003
- Cheap Dinosaurs, Cheap Dinosaurs, DG002
- Ray & The Prisms, Timelapse in Colour, DG001
- Tadoma, Field Notes, DG000

== Curated events ==
- The Switched-On Garden 001, Bartram's Garden
- Computer Groove, Little Berlin Gallery
- The Switched-On Garden 002, Bartram's Garden
- Hidden City Festival (Contemporary Archives, A\V Archaeology, Heritage Electronics)
- Art Splash at the Philadelphia Museum of Art

== Sound installations ==
- Data Garden Quartet, The Philadelphia Museum of Art
- A\V Archaeology, Hidden City Festival
- Duet, Center for PostNatural History
- Personified, Noguchi Museum
- Hexidecibel, CCNH
- Personified, Institute of Contemporary Art – Philadelphia
- Duet, Bang Pop Festival/ SXSW

== See also ==
- List of record labels
- List of electronic music record labels
