= Verbovaya Doshchechka =

Ukrainian folk song

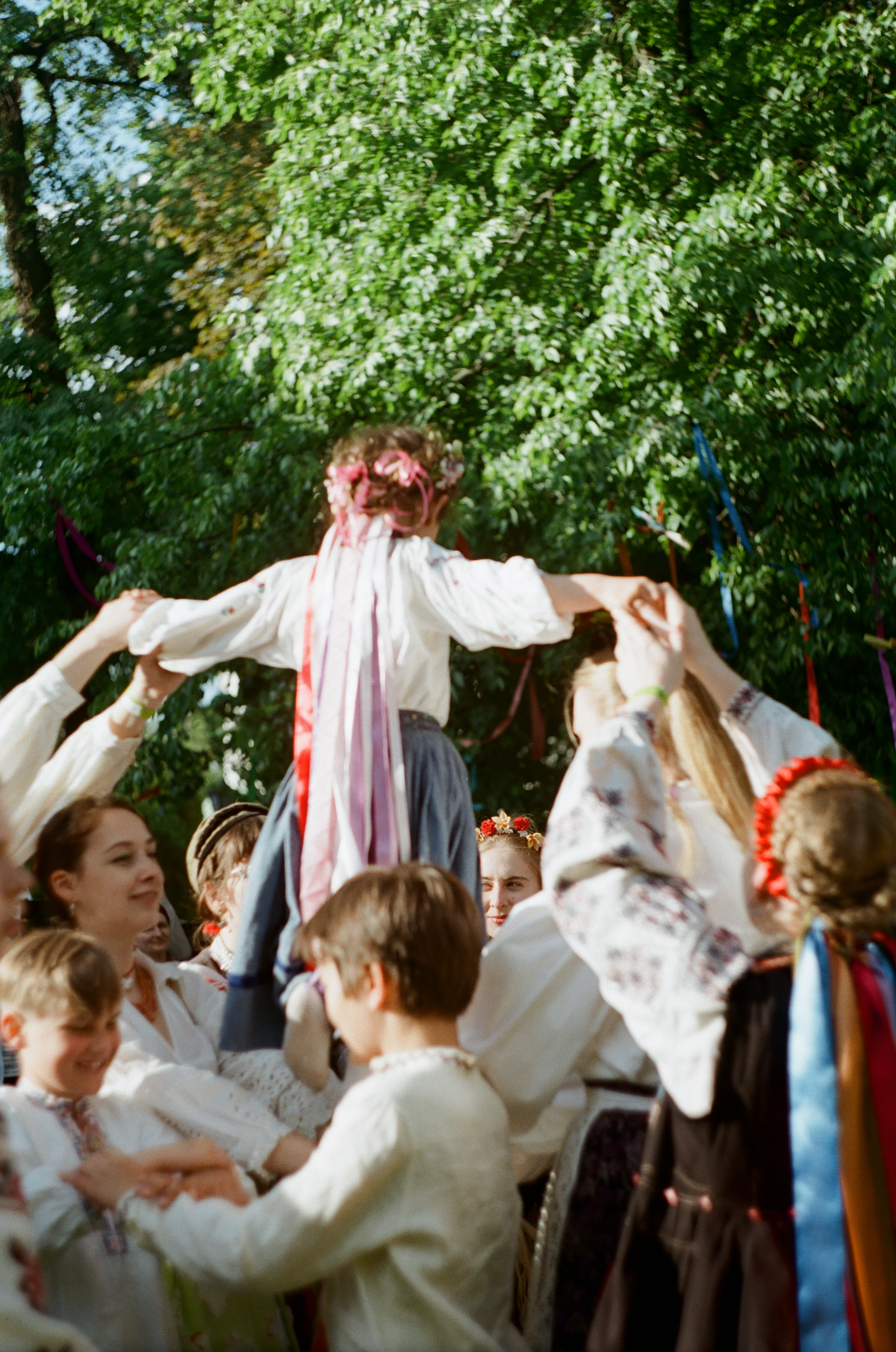
- Children playing "Willow Board"

Song
- English title: Willow Board
- Genre: Vesnianky

"Verbovaya doshchechka" (Ukrainian: Вербовая дощечка, lit. 'Willow Board') is a Ukrainian folk song that is traditionally sung during an ancient traditional Ukrainian spring game called 'the Willow Board' also known under many other alternative Ukrainian names such as 'Noise' (Шум, Shum), 'via Bridges' (Мостами, Mostamy), 'Bug' (Жук, Zhuk or Жучок, Zhuchok), 'Goalkeeper' (Воротар, Vorotar) etc. It is one of the most widespread vesnianka songs of that type, typical for the regions of Podolia, Prykarpattia and Western Polesia.

In Ukrainian Galicia, the song has been traditionally performed during Easter holidays. It became newly popular in Ukraine in the late 1960s through its 1965 arrangement by Ukrainian composer Myroslav Skoryk, which was used in the soundtrack of Sergei Parajanov's Ukrainian-language film Shadows of Forgotten Ancestors.

The American folk duo A Hawk and a Hacksaw's features this song under the title "Wedding Theme (Ukraine)" on their 2013 album You Have Already Gone to the Other World.

== Text ==
Ukrainian
Вербовая дощечка, дощечка,
Біля мого мостечка, мостечка.

На все поле леліє, леліє,
Звідки милий приїде, приїде?

Звідки милий приїде, приїде?
Що Насточці привезе, привезе?

Червонії чоботи, чоботи,
До ліпшої роботи, роботи.

Вербовая дощечка, дощечка,
Біля мого мостечка, мостечка.

Transcription
Verbovaja doščečka, doščečka,
Bil'a moho mostečka, mostečka.

Na vse pole lelije, lelije,
Zvidky mylyj pryjide, pryjide?

Zvidky milyj pryjide, pryjide?
Ščo Nastočci pryveze, pryveze?

Červoniji čoboty, čoboty,
Do lipšoji roboty, roboty.

Verbovaja doščečka, doščečka,
Bil'a moho mostečka, mostečka.

The willowood plank, plank,
Near my little bridge, bridge.

On the entire field she glistens, she glistens,
Where will darling come from, come from?

Where will darling come from, come from?
What will he bring for Nastechka, will he bring?

Red boots, boots,
For better work, work.

The willowood plank, plank,
By my little bridge, bridge.
