= Icy Demons =

American experimental music project

Icy Demons is an experimental music project started by Bablicon's Griffin Rodriguez (credited as Blue Hawaii) and Man Man / Need New Body's Christopher Powell (Pow Pow). A project of various Chicago musicians, they have released three albums, Fight Back! on the Elephant 6-associated label Cloud Recordings, Tears of a Clone on Eastern Developments Music, and Miami Ice on the label started by Rodriguez and Powell called Obey Your Brain.

== Influences and style ==
Demons can be seen as a continuation of the Canterbury scene, which involved acts like Soft Machine and Robert Wyatt. They do, however, move into new ground by mixing this Canterbury style with a noticeable Krautrock influence, especially that of Can. Some melodic lines and rhythmic patterns are strongly reminiscent of Frank Zappa's compositions. Other similar acts include Aksak Maboul, Pit er Pat, Pop-off Tuesday, Lightning Bolt, and Cheer-Accident.

== Discography ==
- (2004) Fight Back!
- (2005) Jump Off 7" b/w Pit Er Pat
- (2006) Tears of a Clone
- (2008) Miami Ice

== Members (past and present) ==
- Griffin Rodriguez a.k.a. Blue Hawaii a.k.a. Tombstone G
- Chris Powell a.k.a. Pow Pow a.k.a. Rick Daggers
- The Diminisher a.k.a. Da Minister a.k.a. Thousand Rabbits Running
- Moylando Calrissian
- Dylan Ryan a.k.a. Ilcativo
- Chris Kalis a.k.a. Smart Cousin
- TA-FREAK-YA
- Ali Hawkbar
- Young Master Schneider
- Yo!Hanan
- Christopher Schreck a.k.a. CS-01
- Monsieur Jeri
- Tim Conley a.k.a. MAST

== Shape Shoppe ==
Blue Hawaii also runs a recording studio in Chicago's south loop called the Shape Shoppe. Besides Bablicon and Icy Demons, he has engineered and mixed many local and regional bands' records. He worked with Beirut to record the album March of the Zapotec and an LP with rapper Count Bass D.
