= Mast (musician) =

American musician (born 1978)

Tim Conley (born January 10, 1978), better known by his stage name Mast (stylized as MAST), is a jazz artist, composer, producer and electronic musician. He resides in Los Angeles and is currently signed with Alpha Pup Records, an independent label co-founded by Daddy Kev of Low End Theory.

== Career ==
Conley has toured throughout the United States, Canada, Europe, and Japan as a solo artist and as part of the groups Fresh Cut Orchestra, Icy Demons, and more.

In 2004 Conley released his first album titled Ocean Exposition, a conceptual instrumental jazz-fusion album inspired by his childhood living on a boat. Conley explains to U.S. 1 (newspaper): "The `Ocean' represents life, evolution and motion. The unpredictability of the Ocean in Time and Space. The `Exposition' is the gathering and display of these parts into one big piece of music. Most of the compositions are connected in some way, either borrowing melodies, grooves, or progressions from one another or simply by connecting one song or improvisation into the next." "Ocean Exposition" features Conley (guitar), Jon Thompson (soprano and tenor saxophone), Jason Fraticelli (upright bass), and Joe Falcey (drums).

In 2014, Conley was awarded a Jazz Residency Grant from the Kimmel Center for the Performing Arts, the home of the Philadelphia Orchestra, to commission a new work along with three other composers. The four-movement piece titled "Life Mosaic: Reflections on Birth, Adolescence, Maturity and Death" was an electronic/classical/jazz hybrid. The work debuted in June 2014, and was performed by Fresh Cut Orchestra, an 11-piece jazz ensemble.

Mast was signed to Alpha Pup Records in 2013, and released his debut album Omni i 2014. Two conceptual EPs followed, “Omniverse; Verse 1” (2014) and “Omniverse; Verse 2" (2015), and his recent release is Love and War_ (2016).

== Music ==
LA Weekly profiled Conley’s influential experiences at Low End Theory and his album "Love and War_": “An ambitiously massive undertaking structured like a three-act play, the record’s 17 songs are interlaced with recurring musical themes serving as characters in a sometimes painful, often vicious and always beautifully detailed story of finding love, losing love, letting go and rising above.

Los Angeles Times says that the album “captures the engaging blend of electronic music, jazz and hip-hop that’s been thriving in the underground. An evocative three-part suite chronicling a doomed relationship and its aftermath, “Love and War” is a knotted mix of beats and improvisation...What once sounded like the future has arrived right on time.”.

“Love and War_” was also named at #4 on “The 20 Best Jazz Albums of 2016” by Observer, which described the album as “a three-act suite for programmed breaks and live instrumentation that further tightens the knot uniting abstract urban culture and jazz musicianship into a cohesive, organic tangle of possibilities.”NPR partner station KQED writes that Mast “ adds an ambitious and deeply engaging chapter to the annals of breakup albums with Love and War_.”

Mast is included in The Wall Street Journal’s article on the jazz-funk revival: “MAST (a project by L.A.-based multi-instrumentalist Tim Conley) delivered stellar jazz-funk recordings this year...“Love and War” (Alpha Pup) from MAST adds another effective element to the mix, electronic dance music, and it offers an engaging panoply of sounds that are both of the moment and suggestive of a jazzier version of some early drum ’n’ bass from the late ’90s.”

Spin (magazine) notes that “The man’s approach to electronic music not only incorporates a whole lot of organic sounds — it feels composed with an ear tuned to jagged jazz and dark pop, which makes him kin to folks like Flying Lotus, Thundercat, Daedelus, Ras G, and Nobody.”

Conley’s music has also been featured on L.A. Record, Exclaim!, Resident Advisor, XLR8R, Tiny Mix Tapes, and Down Beat.

Mast's 2018 album Thelonious Sphere Monk, "a rockish instrumental survey" of jazz pianist Thelonious Monk, was ranked by music critic Robert Christgau as the second-best album of the 2010s.

== Collaborations ==
Conley has performed and recorded with numerous well-known artists and musicians, including José James, Mark Guiliana, Taylor McFerrin, Tim Lefebvre, Jeremiah Jae, King Britt, Icy Demons, Juan Alderete, Anna Wise, and Kendrick Lamar.

== Personal life ==
Conley was born in Trenton, New Jersey and raised in Philadelphia, Pennsylvania.

== Instruments & Tech ==
Conley plays the guitar, bass, drums, and piano; he also uses Ableton Live and Reason software.

== Discography ==
- Ocean Exposition (2004)
- John Coltrane - Meditations - EP (2012)
- Omni (2014)
- Omniverse; Verse 1 - EP (2014)
- Omniverse; Verse 2 - EP (2015)
- From the Vine by Fresh Cut Orchestra (2015)
- Mind Behind Closed Eyes by Fresh Cut Orchestra (2016)
- Love and War_ (2016)
- Thelonious Sphere Monk (2018)
- Battle Hymns of the Republic (2021)
