= Délivrance =

Studio album by A Hawk and a Hacksaw
- Released: May 18, 2009
- Length: 37:43
- Label: The Leaf Label

A Hawk and a Hacksaw chronology
A Hawk and a Hacksaw and the Hun Hangár Ensemble (2007)	Délivrance (2009)	Cervantine (2011)

Professional ratings
Review scores
Source	Rating
The Guardian	4/5 stars
Pitchfork Media	(7.8/10)
NME	(8/10)

Délivrance is the fourth full-length studio album by A Hawk and a Hacksaw, released in 2009 on The Leaf Label.

== Singles ==
"Foni Tu Argile", a traditional Greek Rembetika song, is the first single from the album. It was released as a 500-copy, limited edition, hand-numbered 10-inch single, cut at 78 rpm. It was also released digitally.

The song was featured on NPRs All Things Considered as the 'Song of the Day' in August 2009.

== Track listing ==
1. "Foni Tu Argile" – 3:55
2. "Kertész" – 4:46
3. "The Man Who Sold His Beard" – 5:37
4. "Hummingbirds" – 2:29
5. "Raggle Taggle" – 4:52
6. "I Am Not A Gambling Man" – 2:38
7. "Turkiye" – 5:07
8. "Zibiciu" – 2:18
9. "Vasilisa Carries A Flaming Skull Through The Forest" – 3:59
10. "Lassú" – 2:01

== Personnel ==
- Jeremy Barnes – Accordion, Drums, Vocals
- Heather Trost – Violin, Viola, Stroh Violin, Vocals, Accordion
- Chris Hladowski – Bouzouki, Baglama
- Ariel Muñiz – Cello
- Balázs Unger – Cimbalom ("Kertész")
- Kálmán Balogh – Cimbalom ("Hummingbirds")
- Béla Ágoston – Clarinet, Other [Bratch]
- Péter Pataj – Double Bass [Upright Bass]
- Sari Kovács – Flute
- Péter Bede – Saxophone
- Ferenc Kovács – Trumpet, Violin
- Mark Weaver – Tuba, Tuba [Baritone]
- Recorded by Jeremy Barnes
- Mixed by Griffin Rodriguez
- Tracks 2, 3, 4, 6, 8 and 10 written by Jeremy Barnes.
- Track 9 written by Heather Trost.
- "Foni Tu Argile", "Raggle Taggle", "Turkiye" and "Lassú" are arranged traditional songs, adapted by Jeremy Barnes and Heather Trost.
- Recorded in Budapest, Devon and Albuquerque, from August to December 2008.
