= US 1 (disambiguation) =

US 1 is an American highway.

US 1 or US-1 may also refer to:

- Shin Meiwa US-1A, a Japanese flying boat design
- US1, an American sailboat design
- U.S. 1 (comics), a comic book series
- U.S. 1 (newspaper), a Princeton, New Jersey newspaper
