= Dylan Ryan (drummer) =

American drummer and composer (born 1979)

- Born: 1979 (age 46–47)
- Genres: Indie rock, Jazz, Prog Jazz, Rock, Electronic, Stoner rock, Heavy metal music
- Instruments: Drums, Piano, Vibraphone, Keys
- Years active: 2003 - Present
- Labels: Cuneiform Records, Clean Feed, Kompakt

Dylan Ryan (born 1979 in Chicago, Illinois) is an American drummer and composer. He led the progressive-jazz sextet, Herculaneum, and the Los Angeles–based guitar, bass, and drums trio, Dylan Ryan / Sand. He is a founding member, along with Dave (The Diminisher) McDonnell, of Chicago's experimental rock trio, Michael Columbia. He has also performed with Icy Demons, Tim Kasher, Cursive, and Rainbow Arabia.

Dylan Ryan's drumming style with Sand has been compared to Ginger Baker, John Bonham, and Stewart Copeland. In January 2013, Dylan Ryan / Sand released their debut album, Sky Bleached on Cuneiform Records. The second Dylan Ryan / Sand recording, Circa, was released on Cuneiform Records in September 2014.

In 2017, Dylan Ryan formed a new band called Ether Feather and released an E.P. entitled Other Memory. In 2019, Ether Feather released their follow-up album, Devil Shadowless Hand.

Dylan Ryan joined Man Man in 2018 under the moniker Jazz Diesel.

== Selected discography ==
Ether Feather

- Devil Shadowless Hand – 2019
- Other Memory – 2017

Dylan Ryan / Sand

- Circa – Cuneiform Records, 2014
- Sky Bleached – Cuneiform Records, 2013

Herculaneum

- UCHŪ – 2012
- Olives & Orchids – 2010
- III – Clean Feed Records, 2009
- Orange Blossom – 482 Music, 2006

with Man Man

- Beached/Witch (single) – Sub Pop, 2019

with Tim Kasher

- No Resolution – 15 Passenger, 2017
- Adult Film – Saddle Creek, 2013

with Icy Demons

- Miami Ice – 2008
- Tears of a Clone – 2006

Michael Columbia

- These are Colored Bars (2004)
- Stay Hard (2006)

with Rainbow Arabia

- FM Sushi – Kompakt, 2013

with The Diminisher

- Imaginary Volcano – 2006
