= Arkady Filippenko =

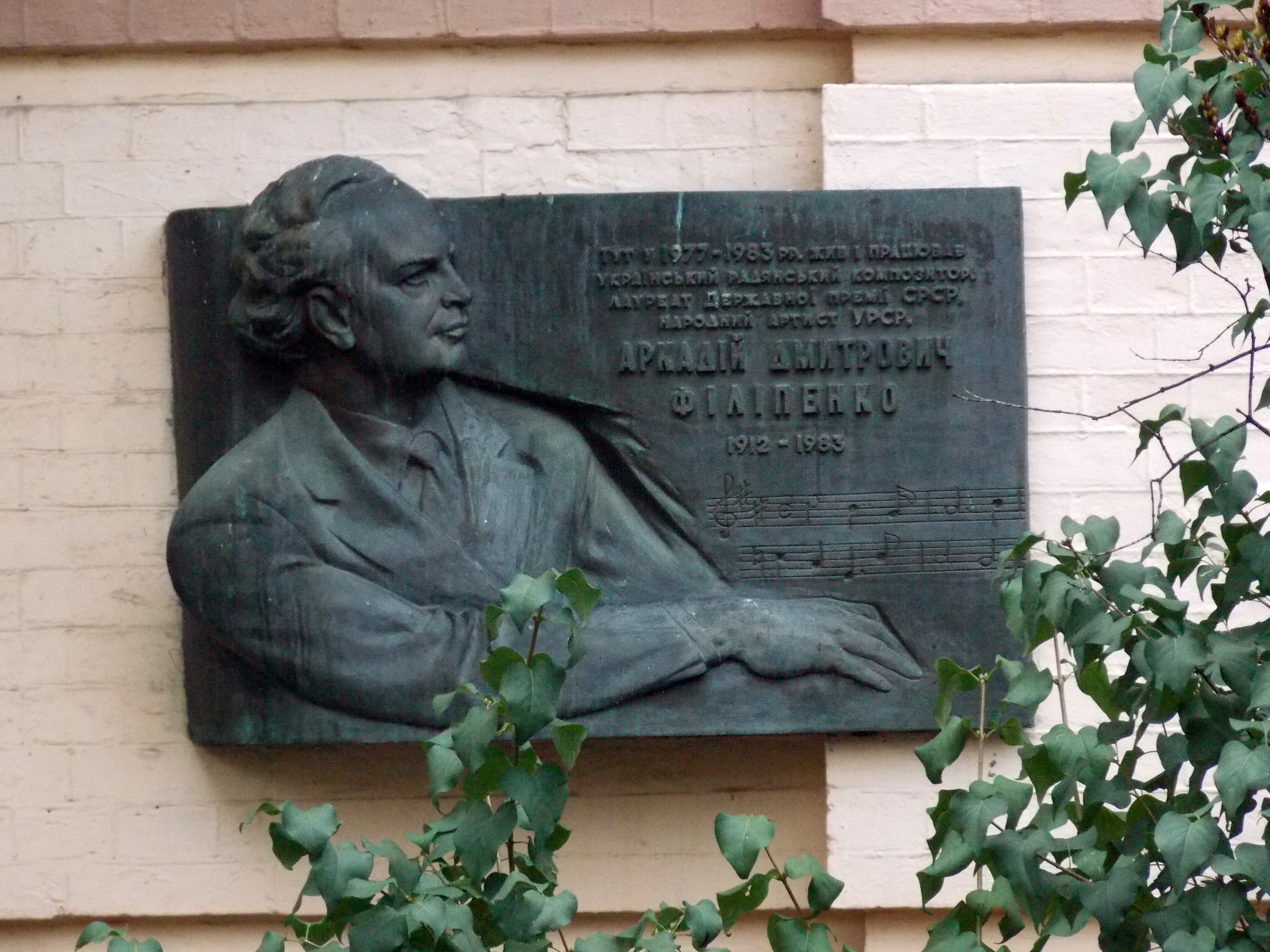
Monument to Filippenko in Kyiv

Arkady Dmitriyevich Filippenko (Ukrainian: Аркадій Дми́трович Філіпенко, romanized: Arkadii Dmytrovych Filipenko) (8 January 1912 – 24 August 1983) was a Soviet Ukrainian composer.

== Biography ==
He was born in the small village of Pushcha-Vodycia, now a suburb of Kyiv. As a pre-schooler, he spent a great deal of time outdoors with his grandfather, a shepherd who played and made pastoral pipes akin to those of the Swiss. The shepherd's pipe was the first instrument he learned to play. In grammar school, he learned the guitar, mandolin and balalaika and played in the school orchestra.

In 1926 at the age of 13, Filippenko began vocational school and completed a course in river transport. After graduation he began working at a shipbuilding factory. In his spare time, he played and directed amateur theatricals and came to the attention of the composer Ilya Vilensky who was director of a local music school. Vilensky invited Filippenko to attend the school, and it was there Filippenko learned to play the piano and studied music theory and composition, all while still working as a metal turner at the shipbuilding factory.

As he progressed quickly, Vilensky sent him on to the Lysenko Music Institute, the most important music school in Ukraine and the forerunner of the Kyiv Conservatory. Filippenko began as a night student but eventually obtained permission to study full-time. His main teachers were Lev Revutsky, Victor Kosenko and Boris Lyatoshinsky. After graduating from the Institute in 1939, he was immediately drafted into the Red Army, where he remained in a military orchestra throughout the Second World War.

After the war, Filippenko returned to Kyiv where he pursued a career as a composer, winning the USSR State Prize in 1948 for his Second String Quartet which evoked the struggles of the Soviet people during the war. He died in Kyiv on 24 August 1983.

Filppenko helped organize the Ukrainian Composers Union and in the mid-1950s served as its executive secretary and vice-president. He wrote for nearly every genre and left several symphonies, an opera, nine works of chamber music (including six string quartets), and more than 500 songs. He was perhaps best known in the Soviet Union as a composer for the cinema.

== Sources ==
- earsense-chamberbase
