= Fight Back =

Fight Back, Fights Back or Fightback may refer to:

== Music ==
- Fight Back (Discharge EP), 1980, or the title song
- Fight Back! (Oi Polloi album)
- Fight Back! (Icy Demons album), a 2004 album by Icy Demons
- "Fight Back", a 1972 song by Solomon Burke
- "Fight Back", a 1994 song by Garnett Silk
- "Fight Back", a 1996 song by The Exploited on Beat the Bastards
- "Fight Back", a 2002 song by Frisco Kid on Riddim Driven: X5
- "Fight Back", a 2004 song by 48May on The Mad Love
- "Fight Back", a 2005 song by Raptile
- "Fight Back", a 2010 song by Ron Wasserman
- "Fight Back", a 2018 song by NEFFEX

== Other uses ==
- Fightback (video game)
- Fightback! (policy), a 1993 economic policy of the Liberal Party of Australia
- Fightback, the Canadian section of the International Marxist Tendency
- Fight Back! News, the newspaper of the Freedom Road Socialist Organization
- Fight Back! with David Horowitz, a weekly consumer advocate show
- Today, Goldhawk Fights Back, a daily radio show by Dale Goldhawk on CFZM

== See also ==
- Fighting Back (disambiguation)
