= Fighting Back =

Fighting Back may refer to:

== Film and television ==
- Fighting Back (1917 film), an American silent Western film
- Fighting Back (1948 film), an American drama film
- Fighting Back: The Rocky Bleier Story, a 1980 television sports movie
- Fighting Back (1982 American film), a vigilante action thriller film
- Fighting Back (1982 Australian film), a drama film

== Music ==
- Fighting Back (Battlezone album) or the title song, 1986
- Fighting Back (Cloven Hoof album), 1986

== See also ==
- Fight Back (disambiguation)
