= The Way the Wind Blows =

Studio album by A Hawk and a Hacksaw
- Released: October 10, 2006
- Label: The Leaf Label

A Hawk and a Hacksaw chronology
Darkness at Noon (2005)	The Way the Wind Blows (2006)	A Hawk and a Hacksaw and the Hun Hangár Ensemble (2007)

Professional ratings
Review scores
Source	Rating
Allmusic	link
Drowned In Sound	8/10 link

The Way the Wind Blows is the third studio album by A Hawk and a Hacksaw, released in 2006 on The Leaf Label.

== Track listing ==
1. "In the River"
2. "The Way the Wind Blows"
3. "Song for Joseph"
4. "Fernando's Giampari"
5. "God Bless the Ottoman Empire"
6. "Waltz for Strings and Tuba"
7. "Oporto"
8. "Gadje Sirba"
9. "The Sparrow"
10. "Salt Water"
11. "There Is a River in Galisteo"

== Personnel ==
- Jeremy Barnes – Accordion, Piano, Percussion, Vocals
- Heather Trost – Violin, Viola
- Ariel Muniz – Cello
- Dan Clucas – Cornet
- Constantin 'Sulo' Calin – Euphonium
- Joseph Garcia – Oud
- Daniel Ivancea – Alto Saxophone
- Costica 'Cimai' Trifan – Trumpet
- Zach Condon – Trumpet ("In the River", "Fernando's Giampari")
- Constantin 'Pinca' Cantea – Tuba
- Mark Weaver – Tuba
- Additional Vocals by Griffin Rodriguez, Ian Scroggins, James Duddy, Joseph Williams, Matthew Taylor, Otto Barthel, Robbie Mueller
- Artwork by Laurie Latham

== External sources ==
Leaf Label site
