= Forest Bathing =

2018 studio album by A Hawk and a Hacksaw

Studio album by A Hawk and a Hacksaw
- Released: April 13, 2018
- Recorded: 2017–18
- Genre: Folk
- Length: 33:33
- Label: L.M. Dupli-cation
- Producer: Jeremy Barnes

A Hawk and a Hacksaw chronology
You Have Already Gone to the Other World (2013)	Forest Bathing (2018)

Forest Bathing is the seventh studio album by A Hawk and a Hacksaw. It was released April 13, 2018. Prior to its release, the song "A Broken Road Lined With Poplar Trees" premiered on Under the Radar's website.

== Album name and concept ==
The term forest bathing refers to the Japanese concept of Shinrin-yoku (森林浴), a Japanese form of nature therapy. According to L.M. Dupli-cation, "This is not an urban music. It's rural; songs of the woods and roads where there are no sidewalks or street lamps to light your way. "A Broken Road lined with Poplar Trees" describes just this- the dirt from the summer sun, a melody from home on my tongue. The song "Babayaga" by Trost, is a tribute to the archetypal crone Babayaga, who sticks out her cane just as a child runs by... And "The Washing Bear" is a classic brass romp, connecting Serbian brass with it's [sic] Southern brothers in Albania and Turkey..."

The band cites the Valle de Oro National Wildlife Refuge in New Mexico as "their forest bath of choice."

== Track listing ==
All tracks are written by Jeremy Barnes and Heather Trost.

No.	Title	Length
1.	"Alexandria"	4:56
2.	"A Broken Road lined with Poplar Trees"	3:15
3.	"A Song for Old People/A Song for Young People"	3:04
4.	"The Shepherd Dogs are Calling"	3:40
5.	"Night Sneaker"	1:38
6.	"The Magic Spring"	3:07
7.	"The Sky Is Blue, The Desert is Yellow"	4:22
8.	"Babayaga"	1:48
9.	"The Washing Bear"	2:18
10.	"Bayati Maqam"	5:25

== Personnel ==
- Jeremy Barnes - composition, Persian santur
- Heather Trost - composition, strings and woodwind
- Cüneyt Sepetçi - clarinet
- Unger Balász - cimbalom
- Sam Johnson - trumpet
- John Dieterich (from Deerhoof)
- Noah Martinez (from local New Mexican band, Lone Piñon)
