= Bablicon =

American music project

- Origin: Chicago, Illinois
- Genres: Psychedelia; free jazz; post-rock; progressive rock; lo-fi
- Years active: 1996–2002
- Labels: Misra; Pickled Egg Records
- Past members: Dave McDonnell; Jeremy Barnes; Griffin Rodriguez

Bablicon was an American Elephant 6-affiliated musical project, consisting of members of Neutral Milk Hotel and the Gerbils, formed in 1996 and disbanded in 2002.

Dave McDonnell—credited as the Diminisher—formed the band with Jeremy Barnes using the pseudonym "Marta Tennae", and Griffin Rodriguez going by "Blue Hawaii". All three members were multi-instrumentalists in the band. Their album In A Different City was released in 1999 in the US by their American Label, Misra, and in the UK by Pickled Egg Records, with them doing a UK tour with the latter label's other artists signed at the time. The band had their audience paint alternative LP covers while they performed, which were later collected as "Painticons" and distributed as the actual album covers for the US LP versions of the album.

Their next release, the Orange Tapered Moon EP, followed in 2000, and was recorded during late night marathon sessions at WFMU. In 2001, the band released the album A Flat Inside A Fog, The Cat That Was A Dog. The band split following this release, with McDonnell studying in China and starting the project Michael Columbia project with drummer Dylan Ryan, Barnes going to France to work on other projects, and Rodriguez working on his Icy Demons project. Barnes now records as A Hawk and a Hacksaw.

In 2021, Bablicon were interviewed by the blog Navel-Gazers, discussing their history and sharing photos, then-unknown trivia, and their projects and activities since breaking up/going on hiatus.

== Discography ==
All albums, singles, and EPs were released by the US and UK labels, except for two Japanese pressings of the single "Chunks of Syrup Amidst Plain Yoghurt", which were released by Japanese label, Contact Records.

=== Albums ===
- In a Different City (CD/LP) - Pickled Egg Records/Misra Records - 1999
- A Flat Inside A Fog, The Cat That Was A Dog (CD/LP) - Pickled Egg/Misra - 2001

=== Singles and EPs ===
- Chunks of Syrup Amidst Plain Yoghurt (7") - Pickled Egg/Contact Records - 1999
- The Orange Tapered Moon - (12"/CD) - Pickled Egg/Misra - 2000
