= A Hawk and a Hacksaw =

American folk duo

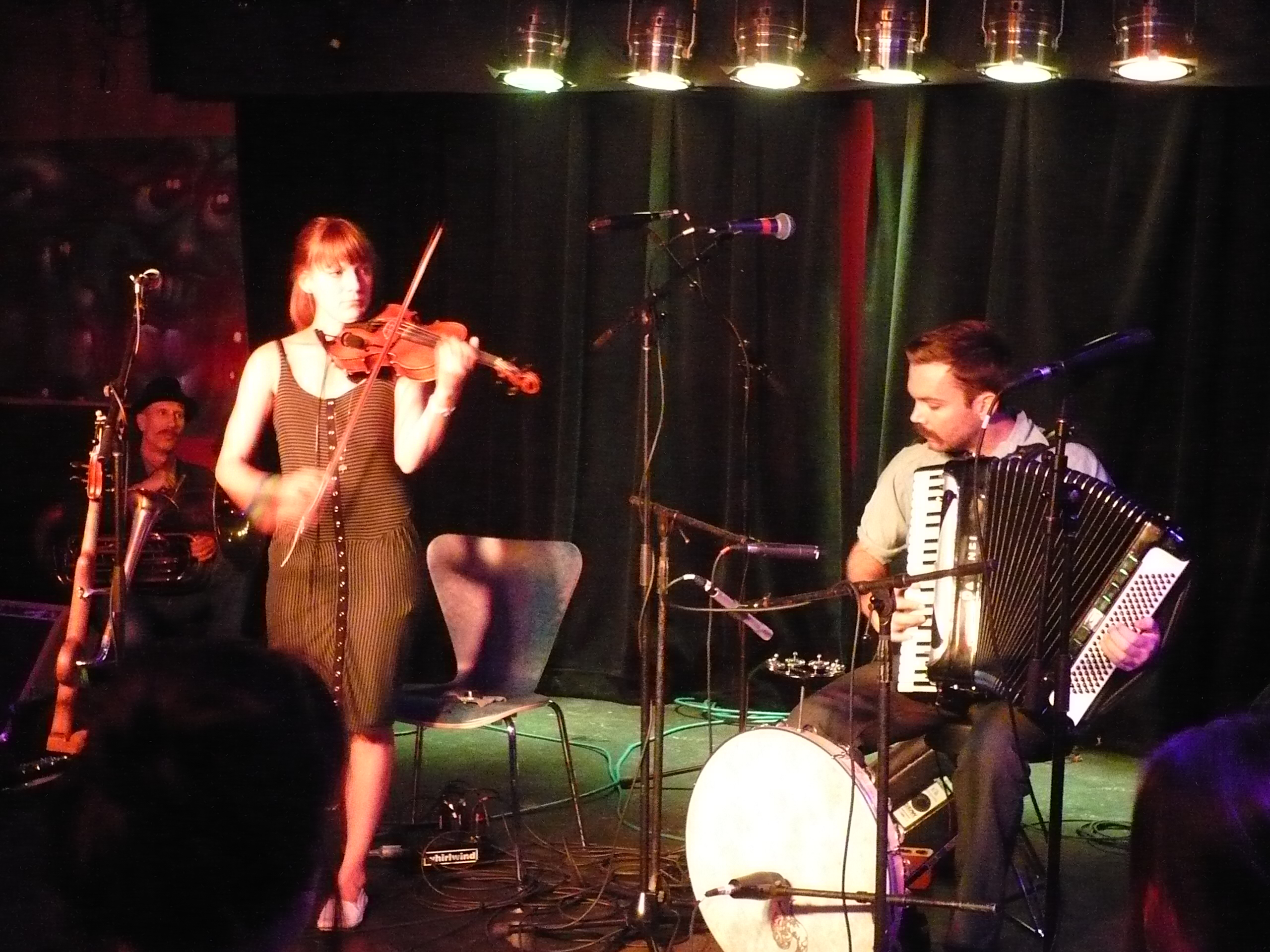
- Heather Trost and Jeremy Barnes of A Hawk and a Hacksaw, performing in 2009

Background information
- Origin: Albuquerque, New Mexico, U.S.
- Genre: Folk
- Labels: The Leaf Label; L.M. Duplication
- Members: Jeremy Barnes; Heather Trost

A Hawk and a Hacksaw is an American folk duo from Albuquerque, New Mexico, currently signed to L.M. Duplication. The band consists of accordionist Jeremy Barnes, who was previously the drummer for Neutral Milk Hotel and Bablicon, and violinist Heather Trost. The music is inspired by Eastern European, Turkish and Balkan traditions, and is mostly instrumental. They have released six albums and have toured internationally. The first four albums and an EP were released on The Leaf Label and afterwards on their own label L. M. Duplication.

== Career ==
While Barnes lived in Chicago, he found himself in a Ukrainian area with many people from Eastern Europe and began to develop an interest in Romanian folk music.

The band's self-titled first album, recorded by Barnes in the south of France, was released in 2002. It provided the soundtrack for the documentary Zizek!, directed by Astra Taylor, which features Slovenian cultural theorist Slavoj Žižek. In March 2005 the band released their second album Darkness at Noon, recorded in England, the Czech Republic and New Mexico. It was during the recording of this album that Barnes met Trost and that the band became a duo.

In 2005, the band met Zach Condon of the band Beirut and gave his bedroom recordings to the small independent label, Ba Da Bing Records. They also played on the first Beirut album, Gulag Orkestar. The band's third record, The Way the Wind Blows (released in 2006), was partially recorded in the small Romanian village of Zece Prăjini, and features members of the brass band Fanfare Ciocărlia. In 2007, they were awarded a grant by the CMN branch of the UK Arts Council, which enabled them to do a collaborative tour of the UK with the Hungarian folk group The Hun Hangár Ensemble, coinciding with the release of a collaborative EP. Barnes and Trost lived in Budapest for two years.

Délivrance was recorded in Budapest, Hungary and released in 2009. It includes collaborations with a number of Hungarian folk musicians, including Ferenc Kovács, Balázs Ungar, and Kálmán Balogh.

In 2010, Barnes and Trost started their own label, L.M. Duplication, and released their fifth album, Cervantine, in February 2011. It features guest performances from Stephanie and Chris Hladowski.

A Hawk and A Hacksaw have appeared at the Roskilde Festival, the Green Man Festival, Pitchfork Music Festival, the Calgary Folk Fest, Wellington Arts Fest (N.Z.), among others. They have also toured with Wilco, Calexico, Andrew Bird, of Montreal, Beirut and Portishead.

They were chosen by Jeff Mangum of Neutral Milk Hotel to perform at the All Tomorrow's Parties festival that he curated in March 2012 in Minehead, England. They performed a new and original soundtrack to Sergei Parajanov's 1964 classic; Shadows of Forgotten Ancestors. In 2013 they released the soundtrack as You Have Already Gone to the Other World.

== Name ==
The name "A Hawk and A Hacksaw" is a reference to the book Don Quixote by Miguel de Cervantes. Don Quixote was written in 1605. This quotation comes from William Shakespeare's Hamlet probably written in 1600; I am but mad north-north-west: when the wind is southerly I know a hawk from a handsaw. The original quote was changed from "Handsaw" to "Hacksaw" to reference the Aksak meter that is prevalent in Balkan and Turkish music.

In the original Don Quixote, Cervantes contrasted black and white rather than a hawk and a hand-saw. The Tobias Smollett translation, however, reads, "...therefore, let every man lay his hand upon his heart and not pretend to mistake an hawk for a hand-saw; for, we are all as God made us, and many of us much worse." Barnes explained the name as "when I was starting [the band], I felt like – and I still do feel like - Don Quixote".

== Discography ==
=== Studio albums ===
- A Hawk and a Hacksaw (2002 – Cloud Recordings, 2004 re-issue - The Leaf Label)
- Darkness at Noon (2005 – The Leaf Label)
- The Way the Wind Blows (2006 – The Leaf Label)
- Délivrance (2009 – The Leaf Label)
- Cervantine (2011 – L.M. Duplication)
- You Have Already Gone to the Other World (2013 – L.M. Duplication)
- Forest Bathing (April 13, 2018 – L.M. Duplication)

=== EPs ===
- A Hawk and a Hacksaw and the Hun Hangár Ensemble (2007 – The Leaf Label)

=== Singles ===
- "Foni Tu Argile" (2009 – The Leaf Label)
