= Levko Revutsky =

Ukrainian composer

Levko Revutsky PAUSSR
- Левко Ревуцький
- Revutsky in 1974
- Born: 20 February [O.S. 8 February] 1889; Irzhavets, Priluksky Uyezd, Poltava Governorate, Russian Empire
- Died: 30 March 1977 (aged 88); Kiev, Ukrainian SSR, Soviet Union
- Resting place: Baikove Cemetery
- Occupations: Composer; music pedagogue
- Writing career
- Notable awards: Shevchenko National Prize

Levko Mykolaiovych Revutsky (Ukrainian: Левко Миколайович Ревуцький; 20 February [O.S. 8 February] 1889 – 30 March 1977) was a Soviet and Ukrainian composer, pedagogue, and public figure.

Amongst his students at the Lysenko Music Institute were the composers Arkady Filippenko and Valentyn Silvestrov.

== Biography ==
=== Early life and education ===
Levko Mykolayovych Revutsky was born on 20 February [O.S. 8 February] 1889 in Irzhavets, Priluksky Uyezd of the Poltava Governorate (presently in the Chernihiv Oblast) in Ukraine). His father was a trustee of a rural school. The parents of the future composer were well-educated. His musical talent showed up very early and his mother began to teach young Revutsky to play the piano when he hardly was five years old. By age ten, he showed skill at improvisation and had perfect pitch, earning him the nickname "Tuning fork".

In 1903, his parents transferred Revutsky to Kiev's Gotlib Valker gymnasium and simultaneously the music school of Mykola Tumanovsky where he studied fortepiano with Mykola Lysenko. Revutsky later recalled, "Lysenko became for me the first example of artistic ideals."

Graduating from the gymnasium in 1907, he entered the physic-mathematics faculty of Kiev University. In 1908, Revutsky also entered law school and at the same time renewed piano classes at the Kiev music college run by the Russian Musical Society. He was greatly impressed by visits to Moscow and Saint Petersburg where he attended the theatre and concerts.

In three years of studies in the premiere course of the school Revutsky had considerable successes. In 1911 he graduated to the higher level in the class of G. Hodorovsky. Revutsky's studies in the class of this master lasted a few years: from 1911 to 1913 year in musical school, and afterwards in the newly opened Kiev conservatory. In the conservatory, Revutsky simultaneously with his piano studies begins to visit Glière's composition classes. He continued his university studies.

The first part of piano sonata (in C minor), sketches for the first symphony, and the prelude of opus four were created at this time. Revutsky graduated from both the university and conservatory in 1916, and went to fight in World War 1.

=== Post graduate work ===
Demobilized in 1918, Revutsky moved to Pryluky. In 1924, Revutsky was invited to Kiev to work as a teacher at the Lysenko Music-Drama Institute. From this time he gave himself to pedagogical work, initially as teacher, and then as professor of music-theory and performance and composition .

In the 1930s Revutsky had considerable achievements as a composer. In addition, he created his music-pedagogical systems. For his merits in the field of culture Revutsky received the title of People's Artist of the Ukrainian SSR in 1942, and in 1944 People's Artist of the USSR. In the post-war period he participated in a renewal of artistic-cultural life of the Republic. From 1944 to 1948 he headed the Composers Union of Ukraine. Revutsky was also elected by the deputy of Supreme Soviet of the Ukrainian SSR to a number of convocations.

In 1950, he undertook the enormous task of editing and preparing Mykola Lysenko's works for publication. In February 1969, in connection with his 80th birthday and for creative merit Levko Revutsky was awarded the title of Hero of Socialist Labor. He died on 30 March 1977 in Kiev, and is buried in Baikove Cemetery.

== Legacy ==
The creative legacy of Levko Revutsky is celebrated in his native Ukraine, where his contributions to vocal and orchestral music are considered a crucial part of its musical heritage. According to Irene Rima Makaryk and Virlana Tkacz, Revutsky continued and developed the aesthetic principles of Lysenko and Mykola Leontovych.

Many of his works—including the Symphony No. 2 and Piano Concerto—are considered to be the first mature exemplars of Ukrainian compositions in various genres. Revutsky also made important contribution to the development in Ukraine of folk song arrangements; he composed approximately 120 altogether.

Outs of Ukraine, Revutsky's reception has been more muted.

In the deliberations preceding the nominations for the 1941 Stalin Prize, the original nomination of Sergei Prokofiev's Alexander Nevsky was dropped in favor of Revutsky's Symphony No. 2. According to surviving documentation from Mikhail Khrapchenko, the chairman of the Committee on Arts Affairs, the switch was made in order to make up for a lack of representation from non-Russian Soviet republics.

== Awards and honors ==
- Four Orders of the Red Banner of Labor (1938, 1946, 1951, 1960)
- Honored Art Worker of the Ukrainian SSR (1941)
- Stalin Prize, second class (1941) – for Symphony No. 2
- People's Artist of the Ukrainian SSR (1942)
- People's Artist of the USSR (1944)
- Four Orders of Lenin (1949, 1953, 1967, 1969)
- Shevchenko National Prize (1966)
- Hero of Socialist Labor (1969)
- Medal "For Valiant Labor in the Great Patriotic War 1941–1945"

== Works ==
=== Orchestral ===
- Symphony No. 1 in A major opus 3 (1916–1921, revised 1957)
- Symphony No. 2 in E major opus 12 (1926–1927, revised 1940 and 1970)
- Kozachok (Ukrainian folk dance) for orchestra (1929)
- Piano Concerto in F major (1929)
- Piano Concerto No. 2 in F major, Op. 18 (1934)

=== Piano ===
- Piano Sonata Allegro in B minor opus 1 (1912)
- Three Preludes for piano opus 4 (1914)
- Two Preludes for piano opus 7
- Two Preludes for piano opus 11 (1924)
- Two Pieces for piano opus 17 (1929)

=== Vocal works ===
- "The Whole Year" for soloists, chorus and piano (lyrics by Oleksandr Oles) opus 5 (1923)
- Khustyna, cantata (lyrics T. Shevchenko) for soloists, chorus and piano (1923)
- Sonechko, folksong-arrangements for voice and piano (1925)
- Cossack-Songs, folksong-arrangements for voice and piano (1926)
- Galician Songs, folksong-arrangements for voice and piano opus 14 (1926–1927)
- Monologue of Taras Bulba for bass and orchestra (lyrics by Maksym Rylsky) (1936)
- Festive Song for chorus and orchestra (lyrics by Maksym Rylsky) (1949)
- Song-Ode, vocal-symphonic poem (1957)

=== Orchestrations ===
- Orchestration (re-arrangement and editing of opera and additional composition of overture) of Mykola Lysenko's opera Taras Bulba (with Borys Lyatoshynsky)
- Piano concerto by Viktor Kosenko

=== Chamber music ===
- Intermezzo for violin and piano
- Sonata for Cello
- Ballade for Cello and Piano (1933)
- incidental music
- film music

== Notes ==
Cultural offices
Preceded by Kostiantyn Dankevych	Head of the National Union of Composers of Ukraine; 1944–1948	Succeeded by Hryhoriy Veryovka
