= Symphony No. 2 (Revutsky) =

1927 symphony by Levko Revutsky

Symphony No. 2 by Levko Revutsky in E major exists in two editions.

The first edition of the symphony was completed in 1927 and presented at the All-Ukrainian Leontovich Society competition on the occasion of the 10th anniversary of the "October Revolution." The symphony shared first place with Borys Lyatoshynsky's "Fantasy on Ukrainian Themes." According to musicologists, the symphony combines such trends as "Ukrainization" and "Europeanization," and over time it was recognized as the first national work in the genre of symphony. Marina Frolova-Walker described the symphony as being "post-Kuchka" stylistically:

[It is] quite accomplished and attractive, if lacking in originality. It had largely been composed in the mid-1920s, but it was revised for performance in 1940 (and sounded as if it had been written in the 1890s).

In 1940, Revutsky performed the second edition of the symphony. He was awarded a Stalin Prize, second class for it in 1941. Revutsky's symphony replaced Sergei Prokofiev's Alexander Nevsky, which was on the original list of nominees. According to surviving documentation from Mikhail Khrapchenko, the chairman of the Committee on Arts Affairs, the switch was made in order to make up for a lack of representation from non-Russian Soviet republics.

In the postwar period, Revutsky's second Symphony was performed in the USSR exclusively in the second edition, while the first was considered lost for a long time. Only in 2020, the first edition of the symphony was found in the archives of the Lviv Philharmonic. In 2020, the original version of the Symphony was republished by Muzychna Ukraïna and revived in Kyiv on September 22, 2020.

The symphony consists of three parts. All parts are lyrical, diverse in genres, images, and moods. The main theme of the first part is the spring song "Oh, spring, vesnitsa," recorded by the composer in his native village of Irzhavets.
