= Fight Back! (Icy Demons album) =

Studio album by Icy Demons
- Released: July 15, 2004
- Genre: Experimental rock, Avant-garde jazz
- Label: Cloud Recordings
- Producer: Blue Hawaii

Icy Demons chronology
Fight Back! (2004)	Tears of a clone (2006)

Professional ratings
Review scores
Source	Rating
Pitchfork	(7.3/10)
AllMusic	3.5/5 stars

Fight Back! is the first full-length album by experimental rock group Icy Demons.

== Track listing ==
1. "Young One"
2. "Icy Demons"
3. "Manny'S"
4. "Bitter Moon"
5. "Detachable Face"
6. "The Silent Hero"
7. "Chimatown"
8. "Desert Toll - Spirit Guide"
9. "Simian Warlords"
10. "Wet Sweater"
11. "Vera May"
12. "Bowser"
13. "Bitter Sun"
