= Endorsements in the 2025 Australian federal election =

Various newspapers, organisations and individuals endorsed parties or individual candidates for the 2025 Australian federal election.

== Endorsements for parties ==
=== Newspapers and publications ===
==== Daily newspapers ====
Newspaper	City	Owner	Endorsement	Notes
The Advertiser	Adelaide	News Corp	None	Advocated for a majority government but did not endorse a specific party. Against Labor on merits, against Coalition due to poor campaign.
The Age	Melbourne	Nine Entertainment	Labor	
The Australian	National	News Corp	Coalition	
Australian Financial Review	National	Nine Entertainment	Coalition	
The Canberra Times	Canberra	Australian Community Media	Labor	
The Courier-Mail	Brisbane	News Corp	Coalition	Strongly advocated against voting for The Greens.
The Daily Telegraph	Sydney	News Corp	Coalition	
Herald Sun	Melbourne	News Corp	Coalition	
The Mercury	Hobart	News Corp	Coalition	
The Sydney Morning Herald	Sydney	Nine Entertainment	Labor	
The West Australian	Perth	Seven West Media	Coalition	
The Saturday Paper	Melbourne	Schwartz Publishing	None	Advocated for a minority government.

==== Online publications ====
Newspaper	Owner	Endorsement	Notes
Guardian Australia	Guardian Media Group	Labor	Advocated for a Labor minority government.
Guardian Australia	Guardian Media Group	Greens	Advocated for a Labor minority government.
Guardian Australia	Guardian Media Group	Teal independents	Advocated for a Labor minority government.
Junkee	Junkee Media	None	Advocated voting against the Coalition but did not endorse a specific party.
The Nightly	Seven West Media	Coalition	

==== Regional newspapers ====
Newspaper	Location	Owner	Endorsement
The Courier	Ballarat	Australian Community Media	Labor
Illawarra Mercury	Wollongong	Australian Community Media	Labor
Newcastle Herald	Newcastle	Australian Community Media	Labor

== Endorsements for individual candidates ==
=== Bennelong ===
For Jerome Laxale (Labor)

- Chris Minns, Premier of New South Wales

For Scott Yung (Liberal)

- Joe Hockey, Treasurer (2013–2015) and Ambassador to the United States (2016–2020) (Liberal)
- John Howard, former Prime Minister (1996–2007) (Liberal)
- Trent Zimmerman, former MP for North Sydney (2015–2022) (Liberal)

=== Boothby ===
For Louise Miller-Frost (Labor)

- Julia Gillard, Prime Minister (2010–2013) (Labor)
- Peter Malinauskas, Premier of South Australia (2022–present) (Labor)

=== Braddon ===
For Mal Hingston (Liberal)

- Tony Abbott, Prime Minister (2013–2015) (Liberal)

=== Bradfield ===
For Nicolette Boele (Independent)

- Kylea Tink, former MP for North Sydney (2022–2025)

For Gisele Kapterian (Liberal)

- Gladys Berejiklian, premier of New South Wales (2017–2021) (Liberal)
- Joe Hockey, Treasurer (2013–2015) and Ambassador to the United States (2016–2020) (Liberal)
- Trent Zimmerman, former MP for North Sydney (2015–2022) (Liberal)

=== Bullwinkel ===
For Matt Moran (Liberal)

- Tony Abbott, Liberal Prime Minister 2013–2015
- John Howard, Liberal Prime Minister 1996–2007

=== Curtin ===
For Kate Chaney (Independent)

- Fred Chaney, deputy leader of the Liberal Party (1989–1990) (candidate's uncle)
- Michael Chaney, businessman and former Chancellor of the University of Western Australia, father

For Tom White (Liberal)

- John Howard, Liberal Prime Minister 1996–2007

=== Dickson ===
For Peter Dutton (LNP)

- Tony Abbott, Liberal Prime Minister 2013–2015
- Nigel Farage, Leader of Reform UK and MP for Clacton (UK)
- John Howard, Liberal Prime Minister 1996–2007
- Paul Murray, presenter on Sky News Australia
- Scott Morrison, Liberal Prime Minister 2018–2022

=== Dobell ===
For Brendan Small (Liberal)

- Tony Abbott, Liberal Prime Minister 2013–2015

=== Eden-Monaro ===
For Kristy McBain (Labor)

- Ricky Stuart, Australian Rugby League coach

=== Fowler ===
For Tu Le (Labor)

- Chris Hayes, Former Member for Fowler 2010–2022 and Werriwa 2005–2010
- Chris Minns, Premier of New South Wales

=== Gilmore ===
For Fiona Phillips (Labor)

- Jennifer Robinson, human rights lawyer and barrister

=== Goldstein ===
For Zoe Daniel (Independent)

- Stephen Charles KC, Judge of the Supreme Court of Victoria Court of Appeal 1995–2006
- Simon Holmes à Court, businessman and convenor of Climate 200
- Ian Macphee, Liberal Party Member for Goldstein 1984–1990

=== Grayndler ===
For Anthony Albanese (Labor)

- Julian Assange, founder of WikiLeaks
- Joe Exotic, American celebrity
- Julia Gillard, Labor Prime Minister 2010–2013
- Jennifer Robinson, human rights lawyer and barrister

=== Kooyong ===
For Amelia Hamer (Liberal)

- Ted Baillieu, Premier of Victoria 2010–2013
- Peter Costello, Liberal Treasurer 1996–2007 and Deputy Leader of the Liberal Party 1995–2007
- Lindsay Fox, businessman
- Josh Frydenberg, Liberal Treasurer 2018–2022 and Deputy Leader of the Liberal Party 2018–2022
- Jeff Kennett, Premier of Victoria 1992–1999

For Monique Ryan (Independent)

- Julian Burnside, human rights lawyer and Australian Greens candidate for Kooyong at the 2022 federal election
- Peter Gordon, lawyer and president of the Western Bulldogs
- Simon Holmes à Court, businessman and convenor of Climate 200

=== Lindsay ===
For Melissa McIntosh (Liberal)

- Tony Abbott, Liberal Prime Minister 2013–2015

=== Mackellar ===
For James Brown (Liberal)

- John Howard, Liberal Prime Minister 1996–2007

For Sophie Scamps (Independent)

- Juanita Phillips, journalist and news presenter

=== Melbourne ===
For Adam Bandt (Greens)

- Abbie Chatfield, TV personality and podcast host

=== Petrie ===
For Luke Howarth (LNP)

- Tony Abbott, Liberal Prime Minister 2013–2015

=== Spence ===
For Daniel Wild (Liberal)

- Tony Abbott, Liberal Prime Minister 2013–2015

=== Sturt ===
For Claire Clutterham (Labor)

- Julia Gillard, Labor Prime Minister from 2010 to 2013
- Peter Malinauskas, Premier of South Australia

For James Stevens (Liberal)

- Christopher Pyne, former Minister for Defence and Liberal Member for Sturt 1993–2019

=== Sydney ===
For Tanya Plibersek (Labor)

- Bob Carr, Minister for Foreign Affairs 2012–2013 and Labor Premier of New South Wales 1995–2005

=== Tangney ===
For Sam Lim (Labor)

- Roger Cook, Premier of Western Australia

=== Warringah ===
For Jamie Rodgers (Liberal)

- Joe Hockey, Liberal Treasurer 2013–2015 and Ambassador to the United States 2016–2020
- Trent Zimmerman, former Liberal Member for North Sydney 2015–2022

=== Wentworth ===
For Allegra Spender (Independent)

- John Hewson, former Member for Wentworth 1987–1995, Leader of the Liberal Party and Leader of the Opposition 1990–1994
- Rachel Perkins, filmmaker
- Julia Zemiro, comedian and television presenter

For Ro Knox (Liberal)

- Janet Albrechtsen, journalist
- Joh Bailey, hair stylist
- Mike Baird, Liberal Premier of New South Wales 2014–2017
- Rowan Dean, presenter on Sky News Australia
- John Howard, Liberal Prime Minister 1996–2007
- Erin Molan, journalist
- Lewis Roberts-Thompson, former AFL footballer

=== Wills ===
For Peter Khalil (Labor)

- Julia Gillard, Labor Prime Minister from 2010 to 2013
- Marcia Langton, scholar and writer

== See also ==
- How-to-vote card
