= Christopher Powell (musician) =

American drummer

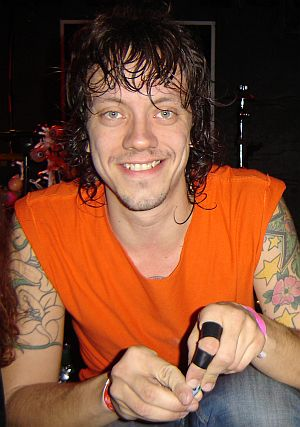
- Powell after a Man Man performance, 15 April 2007

Background information
- Also known as: Pow Pow
- Origin: Philadelphia, Pennsylvania, United States
- Genres: Rock
- Occupation: Drummer
- Website: www.christopherseanpowell.com

Christopher Powell (stage name Pow Pow) is a musical artist from Philadelphia. He has been the drummer and percussionist for experimental rock groups Bent Leg Fatima and Need New Body, the equally adventurous music group Man Man, and the Chicago sextet Icy Demons. After Need New Body disbanded, Powell joined Man Man before recording the group's second album, "Six Demon Bag." He has played on all albums since as well as at all live shows, making him the second most consistent and oldest member (lead singer Ryan Kattner, a.k.a. Honus Honus, being the first). Christopher participated as drummer 11 in the Boredoms 77 Boadrum performance which occurred on 7 July 2007 at the Empire-Fulton Ferry State Park in Brooklyn, New York. He participates in, what according to Obey Your Brain's website is his solo project, Endless Joy. He also participates in the band The Chewables. He co-presented with Brian Dwyer the 2010 exhibit, "Give Pizza Chance" which was one of the bases for museum and pizzeria, Pizza Brain. He also owns and operates the record label Obey Your Brain.

In October 2012, Powell released "Universe Mahalo: Volume #1" which was the first official release of his solo project, "Spaceship Aloha." The songs are a combination of samples of traditional Hawaiian music with electronic beats. Powell has said the album was inspired by his time spent visiting Hawaii. A limited run of plantable postcards were made available for purchase as well. Each postcard included a download code and could than be planted and grown into blue Lobelias.
