= Miami Ice =

Studio album by Icy Demons
- Released: July 15, 2008
- Genre: Experimental rock
- Label: Obey Your Brain
- Producer: Blue Hawaii

Icy Demons chronology
Tears of a Clone (2006)	Miami Ice (2008)

Professional ratings
Review scores
Source	Rating
East Bay Express	link
HonestTune.com	link
Pitchfork Media	(6.8/10)
Spin	3/5 stars

Miami Ice is the third full-length album by the experimental rock group Icy Demons.

== Track listing ==
1. "Buffalo Bill"
2. "Miami Ice"
3. "1850"
4. "Summer Samba"
5. "Jantar Mantar"
6. "Who There"
7. "Spywatchers"
8. "Centuration"
9. "Realize It"
10. "Crittin' Down to Baba's"
11. "Getting Fat at Rico's"
