= Priluksky Uyezd =

Administrative unit of the Russian Empire

Priluksky Uyezd Прилуки уѣздъ
- Uezd
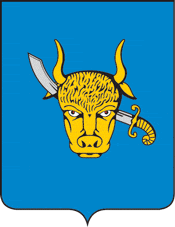
- Coat of arms

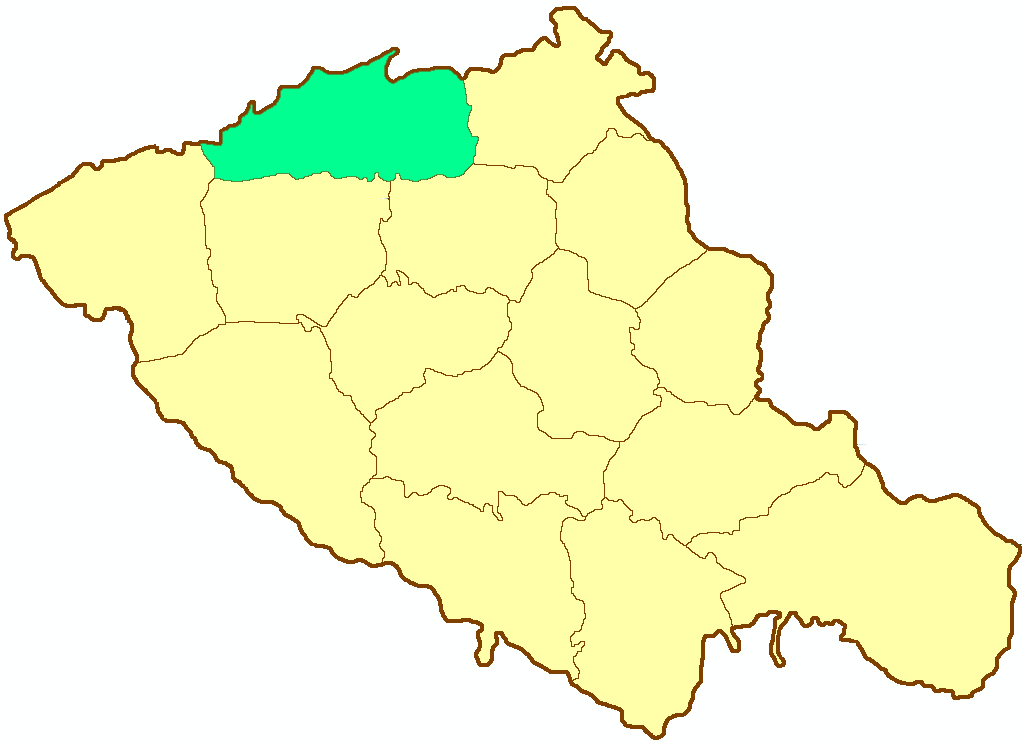
- Location in the Poltava Governorate
- Country: Russian Empire
- Governorate: Poltava
- Established: 1781
- Abolished: 1923
- Capital: Priluki

Population (1897)
  - Total: 192,502

Priluksky Uyezd (Russian: Прилукский уезд; Ukrainian: Прилуцький повіт, romanized: Prylutskyi povit) was one of the subdivisions of the Poltava Governorate of the Russian Empire. It was situated in the northwestern part of the governorate. Its administrative centre was Priluki (Pryluky).

== Demographics ==
At the time of the Russian Empire Census of 1897, Priluksky Uyezd had a population of 192,502. Of these, 94.6% spoke Ukrainian, 4.3% Yiddish and 1.0% Russian as their native language.
