= Darkness at Noon (A Hawk and a Hacksaw album) =

Studio album by A Hawk and a Hacksaw
- Released: April 5, 2005
- Genre: Pop rock
- Label: The Leaf Label

A Hawk and a Hacksaw chronology
A Hawk and a Hacksaw (2002)	Darkness at Noon (2005)	The Way the Wind Blows (2006)

Professional ratings
Aggregate scores
Source	Rating
Metacritic	73/100
Review scores
Source	Rating
Allmusic	4/5 stars
Pitchfork Media	(7.3/10)

Darkness at Noon is the second studio album by A Hawk and a Hacksaw, released in 2005 on The Leaf Label.

== Track listing ==
All tracks by Jeremy Barnes

1. "Laughter in the Dark" – 7:55
2. "The Moon Under Water" – 3:59
3. "The Water Under the Moon" – 3:52
4. "A Black and White Rainbow" – 4:49
5. "For Slavoj" – 4:58
6. "Europa" – 3:50
7. "Pastelka On the Train" – 3:13
8. "Goodbye Great Britain" – 1:34
9. "Our Lady of the Vlatva" – 1:36
10. "Wicky Pocky" – 5:08
11. "Portland Town" – 5:16

== Personnel ==
- Jeremy Barnes – Percussion, Accordion, Jew's-Harp, Organ (Hammond), Vocals, Piano (Grand), Cumbus, Piano (Upright)
- Dan Clucas – Trumpet, Cornet
- Joseph Garcia – Oud
- Kristin Kelly – Vocals
- Heather Trost – Violin, Vocals
- Barbara Burgio – Vocals
- Horacio Samaniego – Flute
- Mark Weaver – Tuba

== Trivia ==
- The album's title, Darkness at Noon, is a reference to the Arthur Koestler novel of the same name.
- The first track, "Laughter in the Dark", is a reference to the Vladimir Nabokov novel of the same name.
