= Cervantine =

Studio album by A Hawk and a Hacksaw
- Released: February 18, 2011
- Recorded: New Mexico
- Genre: Folk; Balkan; Mariachi
- Length: 40:21
- Label: L.M. Dupli-cation

A Hawk and a Hacksaw chronology
Délivrance (2009)	Cervantine (2011)	You Have Already Gone To The Other World (2013)

Professional ratings
Review scores
Source	Rating
Pitchfork Media	7.8/10 stars
Drowned In Sound	9/10 stars
Consequence of Sound	3.5/5 stars
Slant Magazine	3/5 stars
PopMatters	6/10 stars
Allmusic	4/5 stars

Cervantine is A Hawk and a Hacksaw's fifth studio album, and the first to be released on the new label, L.M. Dupli-cation. The album's sound stands out from previous recordings, drawing a stronger influence from Greek Romani music, and the mariachi that had surrounded the group in New Mexico.

== Track listing ==
1. "No Rest For The Wicked" - 8:23
2. "Mana Thelo Enan Andra" (traditional song) - 3:54
3. "Espanola Kolo" - 5:34
4. "Cervantine" - 5:50
5. "Üskudar" - 4:08
6. "Lazslo Lassú" - 3:50
7. "At The Vulturul Negru" - 4:46
8. "The Loser (Xeftilis)" - 3:56

== Personnel ==
- Jeremy Barnes - accordion
- Heather Trost - violin
- Stephanie Hladowski - vocals ("Mana Thelo Enan Andra", "Uskudar")
- Chris Hladowski - bouzouki
- Issa Malluf - doumbek and riq
