= Need New Body =

American avant garde music collective

Need New Body is an avant garde music collective band from Philadelphia, Pennsylvania and beyond, numerous members of which have gone on to become members of the band Man Man. The band was formed from members of the defunct progressive rock/neo-psychedelic band Bent Leg Fatima.

Their second album, UFO, was given the "Best New Music" designation by Pitchfork.

== Members ==
- Christopher Powell / Pow Pow – Drums
- Tookie Sherman – Keyboard
- Chris Reggiani – Bass
- A.I. – Vocal, Banjo
- Jamey Robinson – Piano
- Jim Reggiani – Percussion
- Griffin Rodriguez – Megabass
- Larry D. Brown – Saxophone
- Man Durphic – Aestheticist
- Magic Ronston – Aestheticist

== Discography ==
- Need New Body (2001, File Thirteen Records / Pickled Egg Records)
- UFO (2003, File Thirteen Records / Pickled Egg Records)
- Where's Black Ben? (2005, 5RC / Pickled Egg Records)
