= You Have Already Gone to the Other World =

Studio album by A Hawk and a Hacksaw
- Released: April 2, 2013
- Recorded: Albuquerque, New Mexico at Sonido del Norte
- Genres: Balkan; Folk
- Length: 57:40
- Label: L.M. Dupli-cation

A Hawk and a Hacksaw chronology
Cervantine (2011)	You Have Already Gone to the Other World (2013)	Forest Bathing (2018)

Professional ratings
Aggregate scores
Source	Rating
Metacritic	74/100
Review scores
Source	Rating
AllMusic	4/5 stars
Pitchfork Media	7.2/10 stars
PopMatters	6/10 stars
Drowned in Sound	9/10 stars

You Have Already Gone to the Other World is A Hawk and a Hacksaw's sixth studio album with the subtitle "Music inspired by Paradjanov's Shadows of Forgotten Ancestors". It is a concept album which is written as a retrospective soundtrack for the 1964 movie Shadows of Forgotten Ancestors by Sergei Parajanov.

== Background ==
The album is a concept album, it is arranged as a soundtrack for an already existing movie. Eight tracks are Eastern Europe folk songs from Hungary, Ukraine and Romania which are partly sampled from the movie and newly interpreted and arranged by Barnes and Trost. They also composed new music for the movie and played live along the movie in cinemas and theatres in 2012.

== Track listing ==
No.	Title	Writer(s)	Length
1.	"Open It, Rose (Hungary)"	Hungarian traditional	3:11
2.	"You Have Already Gone to the Other World"	Jeremy Barnes	3:18
3.	"Witch's Theme"	Jeremy Barnes	4:50
4.	"Wedding Theme (Ukraine)"	Ukrainian traditional	3:29
5.	"Dance Melodies from Bihor County (Romania)"	Romanian traditional	3:11
6.	"Hora Pa Bataie (Romania)"	Romanian traditional	1:58
7.	"Nyisd Ki Rózsám (Hungary)"	Hungarian traditional	3:49
8.	"Where No Horse Neighs and No Crow Flies"	Jeremy Barnes	3:39
9.	"Învârtîta Din Blaj (Romania)"	Romanian traditional	2:27
10.	"Horses of Fire Rachenitsa"	Jeremy Barnes	4:55
11.	"Bury Me in the Clothes I Was Married In"	Jeremy Barnes and Heather Trost	2:32
12.	"Marikam, Marikam (Hungary)"	Hungarian traditional	2:07
13.	"The Snow in Kryvorivnya"	Heather Trost	2:58
14.	"Oh, Lord, Saint George, Bewitch Ivan, Make Him Mine"	Heather Trost	5:13
15.	"Ivan and Marichka / The Sorcerer"	Jeremy Barnes and Heather Trost	5:42
16.	"On the River Cheremosh (Ukraine)"	Ukrainian traditional	4:31
Total length:			57:40

== Personnel ==
- Jeremy Barnes - accordion
- Heather Trost - violin
- John Dieterich - featuring on tracks 2,5 and 7
- John Dieterich, Griffin Rodriguez and Jeremy Barnes - recording
- Billy Joe Miller - album photography

== Samples ==
- All traditional songs arranged by Barnes and Trost
- Samples from Sergei Parajanov's Shadows of Forgotten Ancestors on tracks 1, 2, 4, 10 and 15:
  - (1) Open It, Rose (Hungary) sample at 01:16 in the movie
  - (2) You Have Already Gone to the Other World
  - (4) Wedding Theme (Ukraine) sample at 52:33 in the movie
  - (10) Horses of Fire Rachenitsa
  - (15) Ivan and Marichka / The Sorcerer sample at 46:15 in the movie
- An unknown Hungarian (Note: Cited in the booklet as "An unknown Hungarian (78)") on track 14 "Oh, Lord, Saint George, Bewitch Ivan, Make Him Mine"
