= U.S. 1 (newspaper) =

Weekly US newspaper

- Type: Weekly newspaper
- Founder: Rich Rein
- Editor: Rich Rein
- Founded: 1984; 42 years ago
- Headquarters: Lawrence, New Jersey
- Circulation: 19,000
- OCLC number: 173865790
- Website: princetoninfo.com

U.S. 1, also known as U.S. 1: Princeton's Business & Entertainment Journal is a weekly newspaper in the greater Philadelphia, Pennsylvania metropolitan area, with a circulation of nearly 20,000.

While primarily a business-oriented periodical, U.S. 1 publishes two special issues annually devoted to poetry and prose "by local writers on local themes." The paper also produces an annual Business Directory.

The paper's main offices are in Lawrence, New Jersey, near Princeton University. Its founding editor is Princeton alumnus Richard K. Rein; as of 2011, other editors included Nell Whiting and John Symons. It is part of Community News Service, a group of weekly, bi-weekly and monthly newspapers based in Mercer County, New Jersey, and has been a member of the Princeton Regional Chamber of Commerce since 1985. U.S. 1 was founded in 1984, initially operating as a monthly publication.
