= Kálmán Balogh =

Hungarian musician (born 1959)

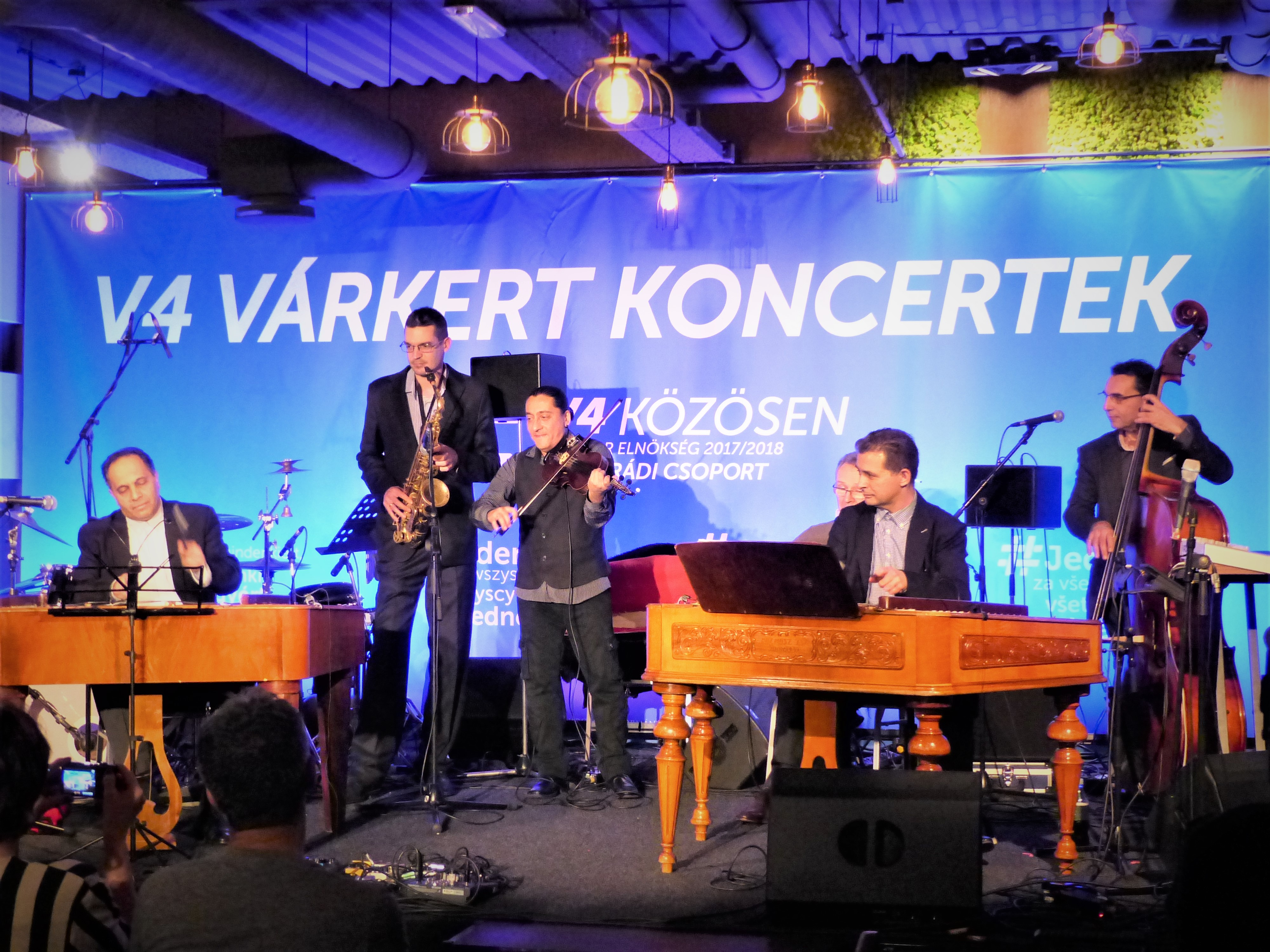
- Balogh Kálmán, Lukács Miklós Gipsy Cimbalom Duo

Background information
- Born: Kálmán Balogh; 18 January 1959 (age 67); Miskolc, Hungary
- Origin: Hungarian
- Genres: Jazz, contemporary classic, Hungarian folk
- Instrument: cimbalom
- Years active: 1980–present
- Label: Folkeuropa
- Website: www.kalmanbalogh.hu

Kálmán Balogh (born 18 January 1959) is a Hungarian cimbalom player and leader of Kálmán Balogh's Gypsy Cimbalom Band.

== History ==
Balogh is a Hungarian cimbalom player and part of a lineage of Hungarian Gypsy musicians. As a graduate of the Franz Liszt Academy of Music in Budapest, he completed his studies in 1980 under the supervision of Ferenc Gerencsér. Balogh studied Gypsy music in Europe and Asia for several years.

As an artist, he has performed with Hungarian bands such as Jánosi, Ökrös, Téka, Méta, Muzsikás, Zsarátnok, Vízöntő, and Vasmalom. Other acts he has performed with include Orient-Express (Swedish), Sultan (Dutch), Ot Azoj (Dutch), Transglobal Underground, Peter Ogi, and the Joel Rubin Jewish Ensemble. Balogh has played with several musicians including David Murray, Arild Andersen, Patrice Heral, Ferenc Snetberger, Peter Ralchev, Ivo Papazov and Iva Bittova.

Balogh was a musical director of Andre Heller's "Magneten Gypsy Show" and performed on a CD with the Budapest Festival Orchestra playing Brahms Hungarian Dances. In 1997, he performed with both the Brooklyn Philharmonic Orchestra and the Miami Philharmonic Orchestra. On 10–11 March 2010, Balogh presented his musical project The Other Europeans at the EU conference "Projects in Favour of Roma Culture", in Brussels, Belgium.

== Discography ==
=== Albums ===
- Balogh Kálmán & the Gypsy Cimbalom Band: Roma Vándor (1995)
- Gypsy Music From Hungarian Villages (1996)
- Balogh Kálmán & the Gypsy Cimbalom Band: Gypsy Colours (1997)
- The Art of The Gypsy Cimbalom, ARC Music Productions Int. Ltd. (1998)
- Balogh Kálmán és a Romano Kokalo: Gypsy Colours, FolkEurópa (1999)
- Balogh Kálmán - Gypsy Jazz, Rounder Records Corp (1999)
- Balogh Kálmán & the Gypsy Cimbalom Band: AromA, FolkEurópa (2003)
- David Murray, Kovács Ferenc és Balogh Kálmán & a Gypsy Cimbalom Band, Fonó (2005)
- Balogh Kálmán: Karácsonyi Örömzene, Gryllus (2005)
- Balogh Kálmán - Korpás Éva: Ó, szép fényes hajnalcsillag – Hungarian folksongs for Christmas, FolkEurópa (2005)
- Balogh Kálmán & the Gypsy Cimbalom Band: Aven Shavale, FolkEurópa (2007)
- Balogh Kálmán & the Gypsy Cimbalom Band: Live in Germany (2007)
- Balogh Kálmán & the Gypsy Cimbalom Band: Délibáb, FolkEurópa (2010)

=== Contributions ===
- Szvorák Katalin: Dalvándorlás, Hungaroton (1986)
- Márta István: Kapolcs riadó (1987)
- Muzsikás: Ősz az idő (1989)
- Téka: Feljön a nap (1989)
- Vízöntő: Gitania Express, Hungaroton-Gong Kft. (1990)
- Vízöntő: Best,Quint (1991)
- Cimbalomos Világtalálkozó (1991)
- Transylvanian Portraits,Koch World (1992)
- Zengő (1994)
- Ökrös – Balogh Kálmán: Hippoglassus Hippoglassus, Around Sound Studios (1994)
- Ando Drom (1995)
- Jánosi együttes: Rapszódia - LISZT és BARTÓK források, Hungaroton Classic LTD., (1995)
- Budapest Ragtime Band: Trubadurr, Hungaroton Classic LTD., (1995)
- Cserepes Károly: Kivándorlás (1896-1914) (1996)
- Üsztürü Zenekar: Szárazfának muzsikája, Fonó Records 1997)
- Joel Rubin Jewish Music Ensemble - Beregovski’s Khasene (1997)
- Ökrös: Bonchida, háromszor (1997)
- Kallós Zoltán: Idegen földre ne siess, (1997)
- Ot Azoj Klezmerband: The Heart of Klezmer,Oreade Music (1998)
- Gypsy Folk Music From Transylvania, Rounder Select (1999)
- Kiss Ferenc: Nagyvárosi bujdosók, Etnofon (1999)
- Zengő: Víg óra (1999)
- Jézus születése FOLK-OPERA 2000 (2000)
- Johann Sebastian Bach: Revisited, BMC Records (2000)
- Cintece ale romanilor din Ungria (2000)
- Vasmalom II., Vasmalom III., Periferic Records (2001)
- International Cimbalom Festival, FRÉA Records (2001)
- Kiss Ferenc: A Héttorony hangjai, Etnofon (2001)
- Ökrös: Elindultam szép hazámból (2001)
- Herczku Ágnes: Arany és kék szavakkal, Fonó Records (2002)
- Mitsoura: Mitsoura, Bartha Bt. (2003)
- Nem megyünk a másvilágra: Gömör – Kishont megye falusi bandáinak emlékére (2003)
- Tükrös: Vígan legyünk!, FolkEurópa (2003)
- LezKlez & Kálmán Balogh: „Ostinato”, LezKlez (2003)
- Üsztürü: Az Öregeké, FolkEurópa (2004)
- Tizenkét Banda: Erdélyország, FolkEurópa (2004)
- Fonó együttes: Túlparton, Hungaroton Records (2004)
- Válogatás: Hangvető 2004-2005, FolkEurópa (2004)
- Parno Graszt: Járom az utam, Fonó (2004)
- Zerkula János és a Szászcsávásiak, Balogh Kálmán, Vizeli Balázs, FolkEurópa (2004)
- Szvorák Katalin: Áthallások - magyar népdalvariánsok, Hungaroton Records (2004)
- Szvorák Katalin: Pünkösd Közép-Európában, Hungaroton Records (2005)
- Hangvető válogatás 2006-2007, FolkEurópa (2005)
- Agócs Gergely: Kilencz Ballada, Fonó (2005)
- Ökrös: Így kell járni..., Gryllus (2006)
- Kovács Ferenc: Beli buba, Gramy Records (2006)
- Berecz András: Sinka ének (2006)
- Vágtázó Csodaszarvas: Tiszta forrás, Fonó (2006)
- Ökrös Csaba és a Dobogó kő (2006)
- Csillagok, csillagok..., FolkEurópa (2007)
- We are Magyar! 2007 (2007)
- Berkó együttes, Etnofon (2007)
- Kaláka - Arany János (2007)
- Gryllus Vilmos: Dalok 4 - Magyar népdalok (2009)
- Both Miklós: Radnóti, Gryllus (2009)
- Rendhagyó Prímástalálkozó, FolkEurópa (2009)
- Kovács Ferenc: My Roots
- Youth Without Youth
- Celtic Lullabies
- Joel Rubin
- Hepta
- Festival d'été de Québec
- Sultan: 20 Jaar
- Balkanswingband Sultan: Obstinato
- World Music
- Orientexpressen: Mahala
- Music of East Europe
- Udrub: Suhanás
- Internationales Hackbrettfestival 2
- Gypsy Music
- World of Gypsies
- The Dulcimer Collection
- Johannes Brahms (1833-1897)
- Dresch Quartet: Archie Shepp
- Sultan: Obsédé

== Awards ==
- 1985 Honorary Young Master of Folk Art
- 1999 eMeRTon award
- 2005 Artisjus prize
- 2007 Kodály prize
- 2009 Bezerédj prize
