= Atilio Stampone =

Argentine pianist and composer (1926–2022)

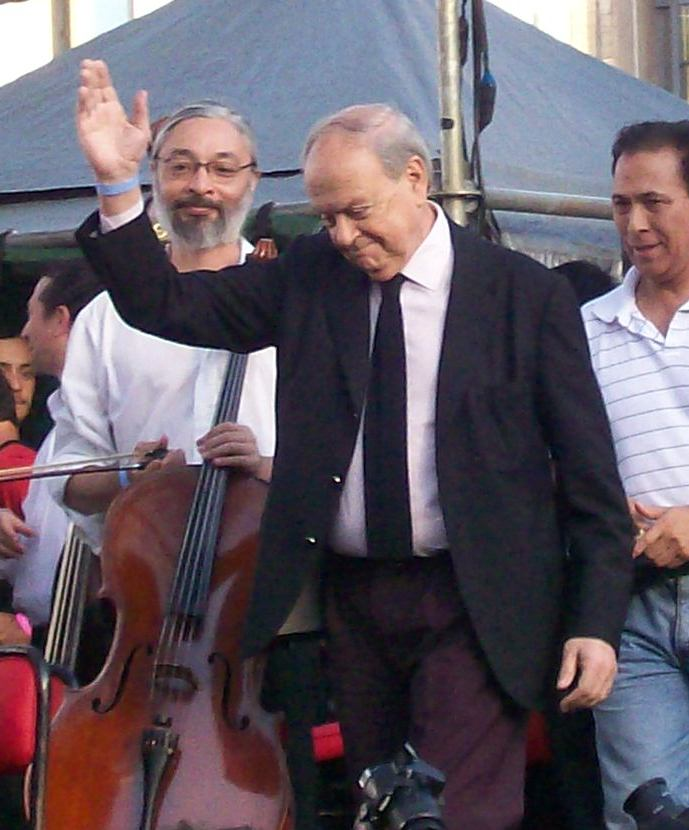
Stampone (middle)

Atilio Stampone (1 July 1926 – 2 November 2022) was an Argentine pianist, composer, and arranger prominent in the Tango genre.

== Life and work ==
He was born to Romana Zangone, from Calabria, and Antonio Stampone, a pasta maker from Naples, in the middle-class San Cristóbal section of Buenos Aires. His older brother, Giuseppe, was by then, at age 14, a bandoneónist in an orquesta típica, and when the young Atilio underwent surgery for an acute appendicitis at age 10, Giuseppe bought his convalescing younger brother a piano. Shortly afterwards, Atilio Stampone joined his elder brother's tango ensemble.

Stampone joined bandleader Roberto Dimas in his Café Marzotto orchestra, a popular Corrientes Avenue act, in 1941, and Pedro Maffia's Tibidabo cabaret orchestra in 1942; impressed with his ability, Maffia personally sought permission for the young pianist's appearance in the risqué setting from his father, who agreed on condition that "you, Pedrito, personally see him to the tram for home as soon the show is over. Atilio is a good kid, and I don't want him living in a cabaret;" with that agreement, he divided his time between the orchestra and his studies at the Colegio Nacional de Buenos Aires, a prestigious public college preparatory school. He later worked with Roberto Rufino and Alberto Cámara, and in 1945, met bandoneónist and avant-garde composer Ástor Piazzolla.

He joined Piazzolla in 1946, and following the group's dissolution in 1948, Stampone became a pupil of Vincenzo Scaramuzza, who helped perfect his technical skill as a pianist. Bandleader Mariano Mores hired Stampone as a soloist in two, 1949 musical comedy productions, El otro yo de Marcela and Bésame Petronita, and following these shows, he joined bandleader Juan Carlos Cobián.

Stampone earned a presidential scholarship from Juan Perón in 1950, by which he studied under maestro Carlos Zecchi at the Conservatorio di Santa Cecilia, in Rome. Touring France, Italy, and the Middle East, Stampone returned to Buenos Aires in 1952 and formed an orchestra with bandoneónist Leopoldo Federico. The Stampone-Federico Orchestra recorded for the TK label, notably on compositions such as Criolla linda ("Pretty Country Girl") and Tierrita ("Small Land"). Federico's contract with ratings leader Radio Belgrano in 1955 left Stampone with sole control of the orchestra, which popularized El Marne (Eduardo Arolas), Nueve puntos (Francisco Canaro), Confesión (Enrique Santos Discépolo and Luis César Amadori), Stampone's own Afiches ("Posters," lyrics by Homero Expósito), and numerous other standards; Afiches helped popularize one of the premier tango vocalists, Roberto Goyeneche.

He continued to collaborate with other groups, including Piazzolla's Octeto Buenos Aires. Their 1957 album, Tango progresivo, became notorious for its poor sound editing, however, and was pulled from store shelves (making copies of the record a collectible, later on). Stampone recorded Tango Argentino for New York City label Audio Fidelity Records in 1958, an album known for El once (Osvaldo Fresedo), La rayuela ("Hopscotch," Julio de Caro), Cabulero ("Gambler," by Leopoldo Federico), and Sensiblero (Julián Plaza). He married the former Lucía Marcó in 1958, and they had two children.

Stampone joined the Microfón label in 1959, where he recorded a double record, with two instrumentals and two with Ricardo Ruiz on vocals. He continued to work with this record company in subsequent decades, and recorded over ten albums for Microfón with his tango revivalist orchestra, some of whose notable members have been: Eduardo Walczak and Tito Besprovan (violins), Abraham Selenson (viola), Enrique Lanoo and José Bragato (cello), Osvaldo Montes (bandoneón), Rubén Ruiz (guitar), Omar Murtagh (double bass), and Eladia Blázquez and Virginia Luque (vocals).

Stampone also became known for his performances at the Palais de Glace (Buenos Aires), and for a number of film score compositions, including those for period piece director Leopoldo Torre Nilsson's Un Guapo del 900 (A Cad out of 1900, 1960), and La mano en la trampa (The Hand in the Trap, 1961).

He joined two partners, football striker Rinaldo Martino and actor Pedro Aleandro, in establishing "Caño 14," in 1964. The downtown Buenos Aires tango hall became among the best-known venues of its type, and helped maintain the genre's following during its pre-revival era in the 1960s and '70s, attracting the most important names in local tango at the time, including Troilo, pianist Horacio Salgán, bandoneónist Ubaldo de Lío, dancer Juan Carlos Copes, and many others; one featured performer, Enrique Mario Francini, died on its stage clutching his violin.

His 1970 album, Concepto, marked a radical change in Stampone's revivalist style, incorporating a choir and instilling the music with a more symphonic sound; among its notable pieces are Responso (Aníbal Troilo) and Orgullo criollo ("Criollo Pride," by Julio de Caro and Pedro Laurenz). Some of his own compositions popularized by the orchestra were Con pan y cebolla ("Bread and Onions"), De Homero a Homero ("From Homer to Homer"), Desencanto ("Heartbreak"), Aguatero ("Water Vendor"), Cadícamo, Ciudadano ("Citizen"), Concertango, El Niño, El Tapir, Fiesta de mi ciudad ("Celebrating My City"), Fiesta y milonga, Impar ("Odd Number"), Mi amigo Cholo, Mocosa ("Spoiled Girl"), Taconeando ("Stomping"), Pequeña ("Girl"), and Vida mía ("My Life"), among others.

Stampone composed the score for the Oscar Araiz's ballet Tango in 1981, and in 1984, composed incidental music for director Luis Puenzo's The Official Story (winner of the 1986 Best Foreign Language Film Oscar). His 1987 production, Tango en concierto, debuted at Madrid's Teatro Real, and was a success in both Spain and Argentina. Other compositions from that era include the score for Marcos Zurinaga's Tango Bar (1987, starring Raúl Juliá) and Discepolín (1989, a theatre production honoring Tango composer Enrique Santos Discépolo). His renown, as well as his activism on behalf of intellectual property rights, earned the election by his peers as President of SADAIC, the Argentine Society of Composers, in 1985.

Caño 14, the storied tango hall, closed in 1987. It reopened ten years later, however, relocating to 2134 Vicente López Street (in the Recoleta section of Buenos Aires). Stampone retired as President of SADAIC, succeeded by Ariel Ramírez, in 1993; but remained in its board of directors. He presided over Konex Award juries in 1985 and 2005, and in 2000, was named Music Director of the Juan de Dios Filiberto National Orchestra of Argentine Music. He was later named director of the City Orchestra of Buenos Aires, while continuing his duties at the Filiberto Orchestra, and was featured in his role as conductor in Miguel Kohan and Gustavo Santaolalla's 2008 ode to aging Tango greats, Café de los maestros.

Stampone died on 2 November 2022, at the age of 96.
