= Octeto Buenos Aires =

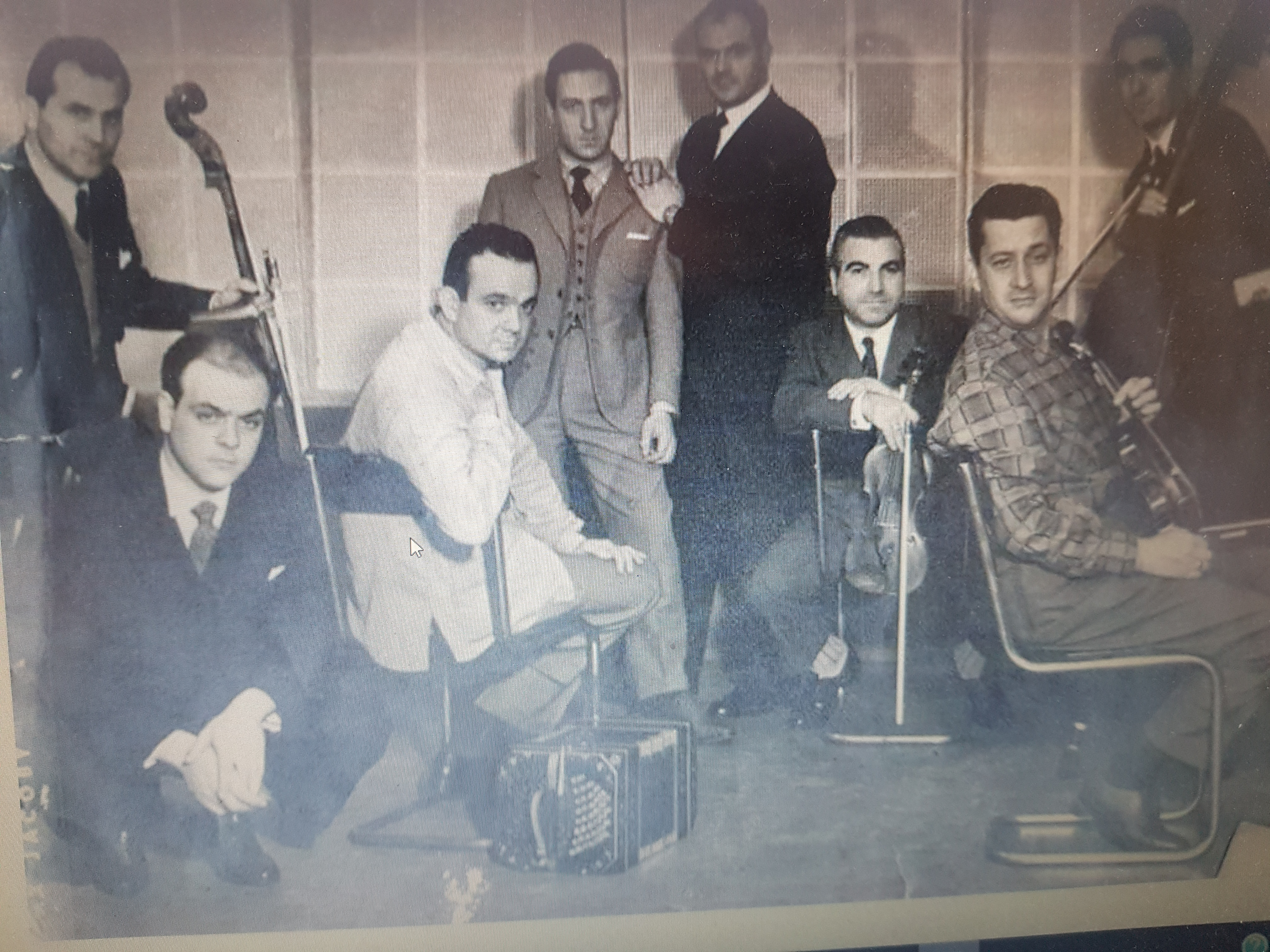
Octeto Buenos Aires promotional photo

The Octeto Buenos Aires was a legendary tango group formed in 1955 by the Argentine bandoneon player Astor Piazzolla. In 1958 the Octeto was disbanded and Piazzolla returned to New York City with his family where he struggled to make a living as a musician and arranger in the next stage of his career that would prove to be so ground-breaking in the history of tango.

During his youth, Piazzolla had served his musical apprenticeship as a tango bandoneonist in a number of orquesta típicas, including those of Aníbal Troilo and Francisco Fiorentino. In his search for new ways of expressing himself musically Piazzolla formed his own orchestra of this type in 1946. Unsure of which way to turn he disbanded his orchestra in 1950 and began to study classical music which took him to Paris in 1954, where he studied classical composition and counterpoint with Nadia Boulanger. During his time in Paris, he had the opportunity of listening to many jazz groups, including the tentet of the saxophonist, Gerry Mulligan. Impressed by the enthusiasm of the musicians and the obvious pleasure they derived from improvising together, something he had not observed in the world of tango, he decided to form the Octeto de Buenos Aires on his return to Buenos Aires in 1955.

Octeto Buenos Aires brief but significant history is considered the turning point between two eras and two types of tango. The ensemble pioneered nuevo tango, a new approach to tango which, until then, had been dominated by the traditional orquesta típicas of the 1930s and 1940s. This would mark a watershed in the history of tango and set Piazzolla on a collision course with the tango establishment. The Octeto Buenos Aires had a great influence upon some of the musicians who were thinking of different ways to modernize tango in the same time period.

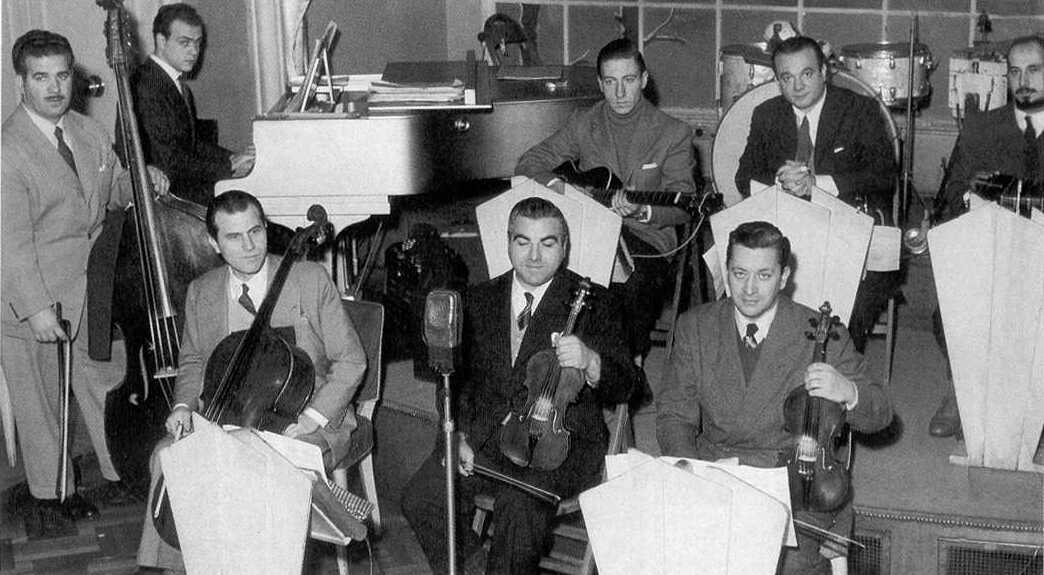
rehearsal from the Octeto Buenos Aires

Piazzolla was carried away by a certain excess in the music he wrote for this octet, based on the classic tango sextet, with the addition of a cello and an electric guitar (something new for the time). However, seen in perspective, what seems like a chaotic explosion of creativity is instead based on an artistic manifesto that Piazzolla respected very strictly. This manifesto sought to place the commercial aspect in the background; to incorporate arrangements of classic tangos and as well as new creations into the repertoire; to not include sung works; and to not perform at dances, but only on radio, television or in concert, or for recordings. The works would be explained before executing them, in order to facilitate their understanding. The purpose of the project was to improve the quality of tango, convince those who had turned away from tango, as well as the genre's detractors, of tango's unquestionable values, attract listeners of foreign music, and conquer the general public.

He chose the best musicians of the day: Roberto Pansera (later replaced by Leopoldo Federico) joined him on bandoneon with Atilio Stampone (piano), Enrique Mario Francini and Hugo Baralis (violins), José Bragato (cello), Aldo Nicolini (later replaced by Juan Vasallo on double bass) and Horacio Malvicino (electric guitar). Piazzolla's first arrangement for the Octeto was the tango Arrabal by José Pascual, which he had dreamed of playing since he first heard Elvino Vardaro’s version of it as a child. The Octeto created a new sound akin to chamber music and without a singer, normally part of an orquesta típica. Neither the jazz-like improvisations of Malvicino on electric guitar, for example in Piazzolla's 1955 composition Marrón y Azul, nor the cello solos of the classically trained Bragato had ever been heard before in tango.

Initially he had difficulties balancing the sound of the Octeto due to the lack of strings, which meant that those he did have were required to play in an unusual way to compensate. The strings were also called upon to imitate percussion instruments and the two bandoneons had to play up to six-part harmonies. The piano and double bass provided the rhythmical force. Soon after the formation of the Octeto, Piazzolla began to wonder whether he had taken tango too far away from its roots, and called upon the highly respected Osvaldo Pugliese to adjudicate. Everyone was greatly relieved when, after listening to them perform, he reassured them that they were indeed still playing music within the genre.

Piazzolla was tired of the constraints imposed by traditional tango and aimed to use his Octeto to introduce new rhythms, harmonies, melodies, timbres and forms, whilst maintaining the essence of tango. His inclusion of counterpoint, fugues and new harmonic forms was to stir up the first controversies among traditional tangueros which would later come to haunt him. His music was beginning to appeal less to dancers and more to people who would go to listen to his music. Nuevo tango had arrived and Piazzolla was in the vanguard.

The complete repertoire of the octet included nineteen arrangements, of which eight are included on this album. Among the compositions, the beginnings of traditional tango are represented by Rosendo Mendizábal. The main composers of the Decarean school are also present, including Julio De Caro himself and the bandoneonist Pedro Maffia, as well as their highly regarded counterpart Juan Carlos Cobián, whose works were of great harmonic and melodic interest. Finally, several exponents of modern tango are included, such as Horacio Salgán and José Pascual, in addition to compositions by Horacio Malvicino and Piazzolla himself.

The only surviving original manuscript of an arrangement of the Octeto Buenos Aires is that of the tango Arrabal, since Piazzolla burned a large part of his scores. The other seven arrangements included in the album had to be transcribed from the recordings, which were all commercially released except for Tierra Querida, preserved thanks to a non-commercial live recording of a 1956 concert held at Montevideo's Sala Verdi.

The performances of the Octeto Buenos Aires were sporadic and its members were obliged to join other ensembles to make ends meet. They would, however, never derive the same satisfaction from these other engagements as from the Octeto. The Octeto made only a few recordings after Piazzolla had agreed to sign away rights to the royalties. Without precedent in tango, the Octeto Buenos Aires was an experimental project by Piazzolla, through which he proposed a new way of addressing the genre that required a new approach to listening to tango, much more arduous than that of traditional tango. The experience did not have enough public to be financially viable, and, furthermore, tango in general was on its way to a major crisis, in full struggle with other popular genres that were emerging, including rock, tropical music, the bolero, etc. The Octeto Buenos Aires lasted just two years but it left an indelible mark on the history of tango.

== Discography ==
Octeto Buenos Aires, 1957

- Haydeé (Hector Grané, 1935)
- Marrón y azul (Astor Piazzolla, 1955)
- Los mareados (Juan Carlos Cobián & Enrique Cadícamo)
- Neotango (Leopoldo Federico & M.Flores)
- El Marne (Eduardo Arolas)
- Anoné (Hugo Baralis)
- El entrerriano (Rosendo Mendizábal)
- Tangology (Horacio Malvicino)
- Arrabal (José Pascual)
- A fuego lento (Horacio Salgán)

Tango progresivo, 1957

- Lo que vendrá (Astor Piazzolla)
- La revancha (Pedro Laurenz)
- Tema otoñal (Enrique Mario Francini)
- Boedo (Julio de Caro)
- Mi refugio (Juan Carlos Cobián)
- Taconeando (Pedro Maffia & José Horacio Staffolani)

"1944-1964: 20 años de Vanguardia", 1964

- Tango ballet (Astor Piazzolla)
