= Astor Piazzolla =

Argentine composer, bandoneon player and arranger (1921–1992)

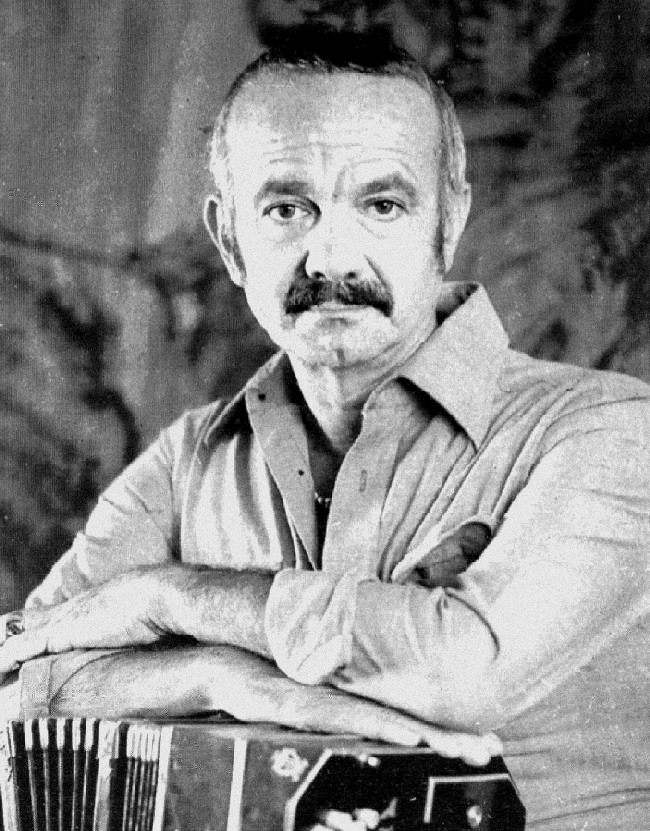
- Piazzolla with his bandoneon, 1971

Background information
- Born: Astor Pantaleón Piazzolla; March 11, 1921; Mar del Plata, Argentina
- Died: July 4, 1992 (aged 71) Buenos Aires, Argentina
- Genres: Tango; nuevo tango
- Occupations: Musician; composer; arranger
- Instrument: Bandoneon
- Years active: 1933–1990
- Spouse: Odetta Maria "Dedé" Wolff (married 1943-1988) Laura Escalada (married 1988-his death)
- Partner(s): Amelita Baltar, 1966-1974

Astor Pantaleón Piazzolla (Latin American Spanish: [asˈtoɾ pjaˈsola]; Italian: [pjatˈtsɔlla]; March 11, 1921 – July 4, 1992) was an Argentine tango composer, bandoneon player, and arranger. His works revolutionized the traditional tango into a new style termed nuevo tango, incorporating elements from jazz and classical music. A virtuoso bandoneonist, he regularly performed his own compositions with a variety of ensembles. In 1992, American music critic Stephen Holden described Piazzolla as "the world's foremost composer of Tango music".

== Life and career ==
=== Childhood ===
Piazzolla was born in Mar del Plata, Argentina, in 1921, the only child of Vicente "Nonino" Piazzolla and Asunta Manetti. His paternal grandfather, a sailor and fisherman named Pantaleo (later Pantaleón) Piazzolla, had immigrated to Mar del Plata from Trani, a seaport in the southeastern Italian region of Apulia, at the end of the 19th century. His mother was the daughter of two Italian immigrants from Villa Collemandina in Garfagnana in province of Lucca in the central region of Tuscany.

In 1925 Astor Piazzolla's family moved to Greenwich Village in New York City, which in those days was a violent neighbourhood inhabited by a volatile mixture of gangsters and hard-working immigrants. His parents worked long hours, and Piazzolla, despite having a limp, soon learned to take care of himself on the streets. At home he would listen to his father's records of the tango orchestras of Carlos Gardel and Julio de Caro, and was exposed to jazz and classical music, including Bach, from an early age. He began to play the bandoneon after his father spotted one in a New York pawn shop in 1929.

After their return to New York City from a brief visit to Mar del Plata in 1930, the family moved to Little Italy in lower Manhattan. In 1932 Piazzolla composed his first tango, "La Catinga". The following year he took music lessons with the Hungarian classical pianist Béla Wilda, a student of Rachmaninoff, who taught him to play Bach on his bandoneon. In 1934 he met Carlos Gardel, one of the most important figures in the history of tango, and played a cameo role as a paper boy in his movie El día que me quieras. Gardel invited the young bandoneon player to join him on his tour. Much to Piazzolla's dismay, his father decided that he was not old enough to go along. The disappointment of being forbidden to join the tour proved to be fortunate, as it was on this tour in 1935 that Gardel and his entire orchestra perished in a plane crash. In later years Piazzolla jokingly made light of this fateful event: had his father let him join the tour, Piazzolla would have played the harp instead of the bandoneon.

=== Early career ===
In 1936, Piazzolla returned with his family to Mar del Plata, where he began to play in a variety of tango orchestras and around this time he discovered the music of Elvino Vardaro’s sextet on the radio. Vardaro's novel interpretation of tango made a great impression on Piazzolla and years later he would become Piazzolla's violinist in his Orquesta de Cuerdas (String Orchestra) and his First Quintet.

Inspired by Vardaro's style of tango, and still only 17 years old, Piazzolla moved to Buenos Aires in 1938 where, the following year, he realized a dream when he joined the orchestra of the bandoneonist Aníbal Troilo, which would become one of the greatest tango orchestras of that time. Piazzolla was employed as a temporary replacement for Toto Rodríguez who was ill, but when Rodríguez returned to work Troilo decided to retain Piazzolla as a fourth bandoneonist. Apart from playing the bandoneon, Piazzolla also became Troilo's arranger and would occasionally play the piano for him. By 1941 he was earning a good wage, enough to pay for music lessons with Alberto Ginastera, an eminent Argentine composer of classical music. The pianist Arthur Rubinstein, then living in Buenos Aires, had advised him to study with Ginastera; delving into scores by Stravinsky, Bartók, Ravel and others, Piazzolla rose early each morning to hear the Teatro Colón orchestra rehearse while continuing a gruelling performing schedule in the tango clubs at night. During his five years of study with Ginastera he mastered orchestration, which he later considered to be one of his strong points. In 1943 he started piano lessons with the Argentine classical pianist Raúl Spivak, which would continue for the next five years, and wrote his first classical works Preludio No. 1 for Violin and Piano and Suite for Strings and Harps.

As time passed, Troilo began to fear that the advanced musical ideas of the young bandoneonist might undermine the style of his orchestra and make it less appealing to dancers of tango. Tensions mounted between the two bandoneonists until, in 1944, Piazzolla announced his intention to leave Troilo and join the orchestra of the tango singer and bandoneonist Francisco Fiorentino. Piazzolla would lead Fiorentino's orchestra until 1946 and make many recordings with him, including his first two instrumental tangos, La chiflada and Color de rosa.

In 1946, Piazzolla formed his Orquesta Típica, which, although having a similar formation to other tango orchestras of the day, gave him his first opportunity to experiment with his own approach to the orchestration and musical content of tango. That same year he composed El Desbande, which he considered to be his first formal tango, and then began to compose musical scores for films, starting with Con los mismos colores in 1949 and Bólidos de acero in 1950, both films directed by Carlos Torres Ríos.

Having disbanded his first orchestra in 1950, he almost abandoned tango altogether, continuing to study Bartók and Stravinsky and orchestra direction with Hermann Scherchen. He spent a lot of time listening to jazz and searching for a musical style of his own beyond the realms of tango. He decided to drop the bandoneon and to dedicate himself to writing and to studying music. Between 1950 and 1954 he composed a series of works that began to develop his unique style: Para lucirse, Tanguango, Prepárense, Contrabajeando, Triunfal and Lo que vendrá.

=== Studies in Paris ===
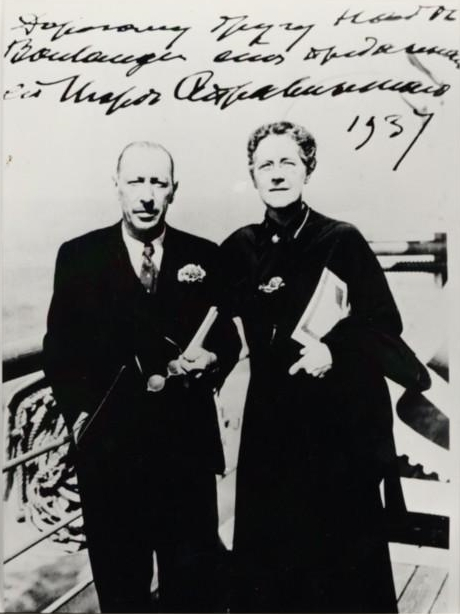
Nadia Boulanger with Igor Stravinsky

At Ginastera's urging, on August 16, 1953, Piazzolla entered his classical composition "Buenos Aires Symphony in Three Movements" for the Fabian Sevitzky Award. The performance took place at the law school in Buenos Aires with the symphony orchestra of Radio del Estado under the direction of Sevitzky himself. At the end of the concert, a fight broke out among members of the audience who were offended by the inclusion of two bandoneons in a traditional symphony orchestra. In spite of this, Piazzolla's composition won him a grant from the French government to study in Paris with the legendary French composition teacher Nadia Boulanger at the Fontainebleau conservatory.

In 1954, he and his wife left their two children with Piazzolla's parents and travelled to Paris. Piazzolla was tired of tango and tried to hide his tango and bandoneon compositions from Boulanger, thinking that his destiny lay in classical music. Introducing his work, Piazzolla played her a number of his classically inspired compositions, but it was not until he played his tango Triunfal that she congratulated him and encouraged him to pursue his career in tango, recognising that this was where his talent lay. This was to prove a historic encounter and a crossroads in Piazzolla's career.

With Boulanger he studied classical composition, including counterpoint, which was to play an important role in his later tango compositions. Before leaving Paris, he heard the octet of the American jazz saxophonist Gerry Mulligan, which was to give him the idea of forming his own octet on his return to Buenos Aires. He composed and recorded a series of tangos with the String Orchestra of the Paris Opera and began to play the bandoneon while standing up, putting his right foot on a chair and the bellows of the instrument across his right thigh. Until that time bandoneonists played sitting down.

=== In the vanguard of nuevo tango ===
Back in Argentina, Piazzolla formed his Orquesta de Cuerdas (String Orchestra), which performed with the singer Jorge Sobral, and his Octeto Buenos Aires in 1955. With two bandoneons (Piazzolla and Leopoldo Federico), two violins (Enrique Mario Francini and Hugo Baralis), double bass (Juan Vasallo), cello (José Bragato), piano (Atilio Stampone), and an electric guitar (Horacio Malvicino), his Octeto effectively broke the mould of the traditional orquesta típica and created a new sound akin to chamber music, without a singer and with jazz-like improvisations. This was to be a turning point in his career and a watershed in the history of tango. Piazzolla's new approach to the tango, nuevo tango, made him a controversial figure in his native land both musically and politically. However, his music gained acceptance in Europe and North America, and his reworking of the tango was embraced by some liberal segments of Argentine society, who were pushing for political changes in parallel to his musical revolution.

In 1958 he disbanded both the Octeto and the String Orchestra and returned to New York City with his family where he struggled to make a living as a musician and arranger. Briefly forming his own group, the Jazz Tango Quintet with whom he made just two recordings, his attempts to blend jazz and tango were not successful. He received the news of the death of his father in October 1959 while performing with Juan Carlos Copes and María Nieves in Puerto Rico; on his return to New York City a few days later, he asked to be left alone in his apartment and in less than an hour wrote his famous tango Adiós Nonino, in homage to his father.

Copes and Nieves packed out Club Flamboyan in San Juan, Puerto Rico, with "Compañia Argentina Tangolandia". Piazzolla was serving as the musical director. The tour continued in New York, Chicago and then Washington. The last show that the three of them did together was an appearance on CBS, the only colour TV channel in the US, on the Arthur Murray Show in April 1960.

Back in Buenos Aires later that year he put together the first, and perhaps most famous, of his quintets, the first Quinteto, initially comprising bandoneon (Piazzolla), piano (Jaime Gosis), violin (Simón Bajour), electric guitar (Horacio Malvicino) and double bass (Kicho Díaz). Of the many ensembles that Piazzolla set up during his career, it was the quintet formation which best expressed his approach to tango.

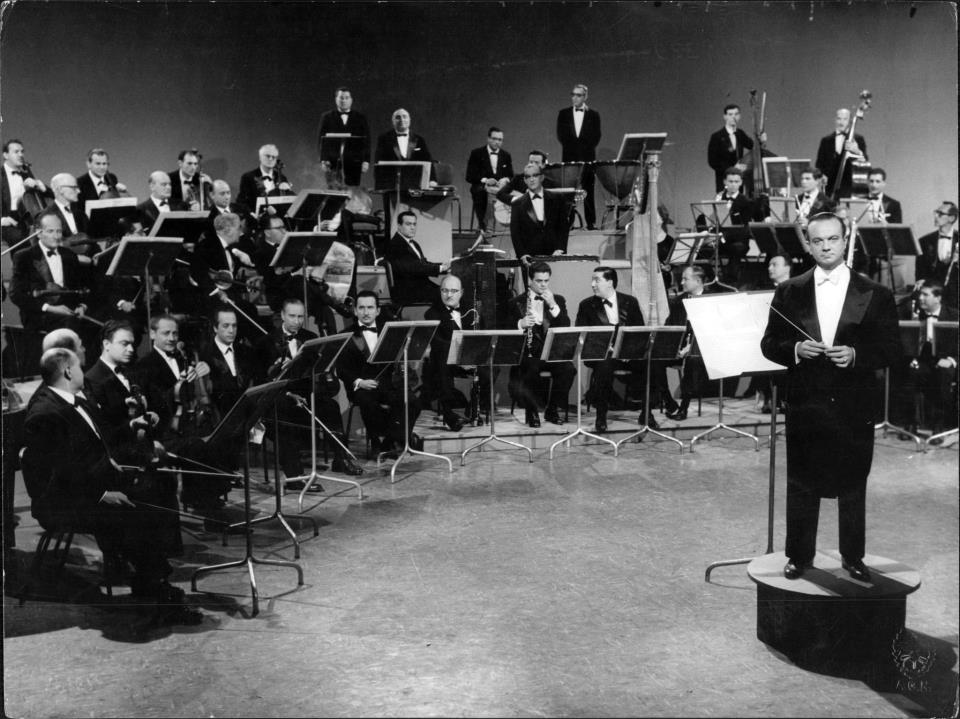
Piazzolla & his orchestra at television network Canal13 in 1963

In 1963 he set up his Nuevo Octeto, and the same year premiered his Tres Tangos Sinfónicos, under the direction of Paul Klecky, for which he was awarded the Hirsch Prize.

In 1965 he released El Tango, an album for which he collaborated with the Argentine writer Jorge Luis Borges. The recording featured his Quinteto together with an orchestra, the singer Edmundo Rivero and Luis Medina Castro reciting texts.

In 1966 he left Dedé Wolff and the following year signed a five-year contract with the poet Horacio Ferrer with whom he composed the 'operita' (little opera) María de Buenos Aires, with lyrics by Ferrer. The work was premiered in May 1968 with the singer Amelita Baltar in the title role and introduced a new style of tango, Tango Canción (in English: Song Tango). The following year he wrote Balada para un loco with lyrics by Ferrer, which was premiered at the First Iberoamerican Music Festival with Amelita Baltar, and Piazzolla himself conducting the orchestra. Piazzolla was awarded second prize and the composition would prove to be his first popular success.

In 1970 Piazzolla returned to Paris where with Ferrer he wrote the oratorio El pueblo joven, later premiered in Saarbrücken, Germany in 1971. On May 19, 1970, he gave a concert with his Quinteto at the Teatro Regina in Buenos Aires in which he premiered his composition Cuatro Estaciones Porteñas.

Back in Buenos Aires he founded his Conjunto 9 (also known as Nonet), a chamber music formation, which was a realisation of a dream for Piazzolla and for which he composed some of his most sophisticated music. He now put aside his first Quinteto and made several recordings with his new ensemble in Italy. Within a year the Conjunto 9 had run into financial problems and was dissolved and in 1972 he participated in his first concert at the Teatro Colón in Buenos Aires, sharing the bill with other Tango orchestras.

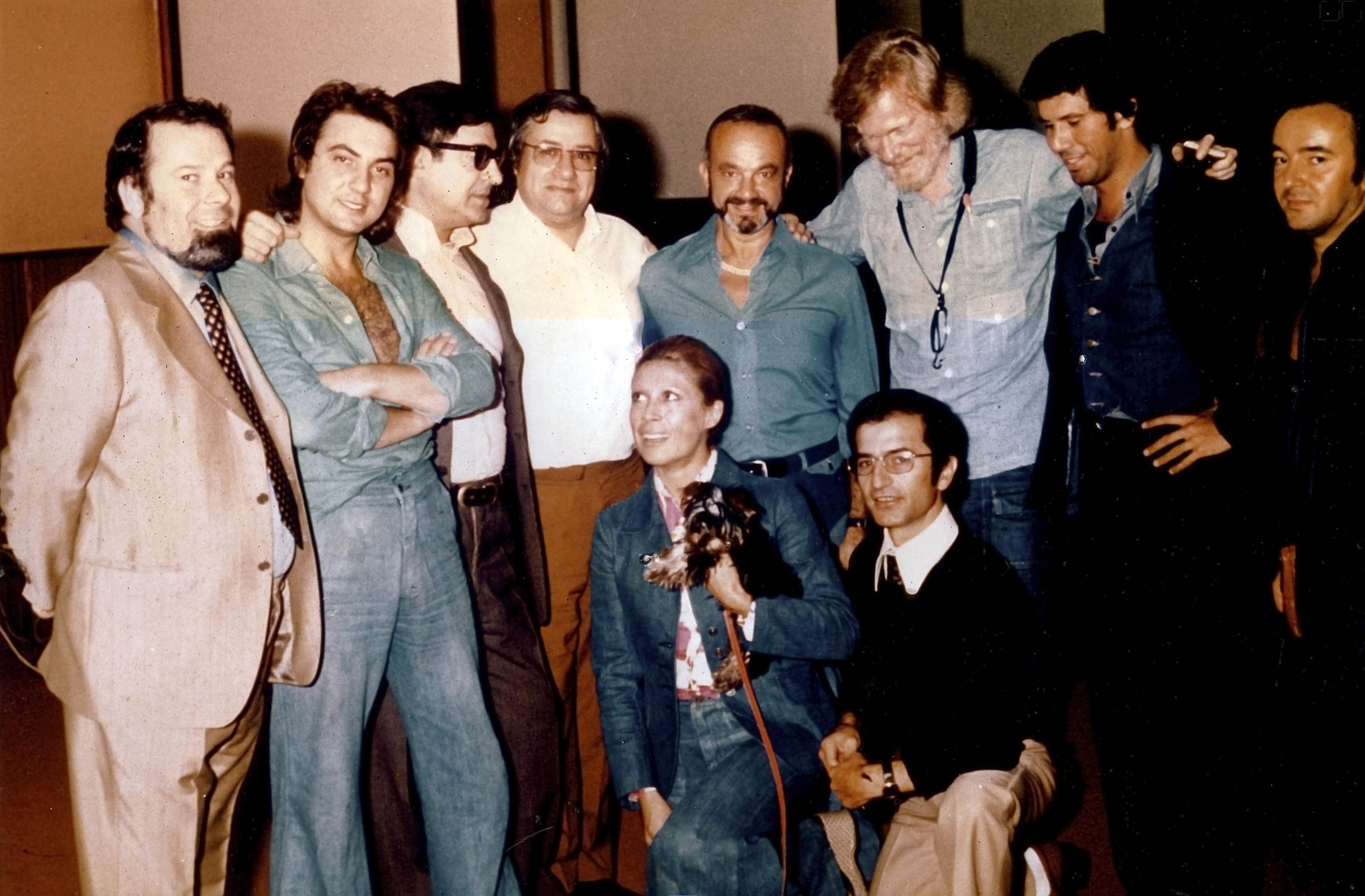
Astor Piazzolla with Gerry Mulligan at the Summit recording, Milan (Italy) 1974. The image includes the producer Aldo Pagani, first from the left, and some performers, including Pino Presti, second from right, and Tullio De Piscopo, second from left

After a period of great productivity as a composer, he suffered a heart attack in 1973. That same year he moved to Italy where he began a series of recordings which would span a period of five years. The music publisher Aldo Pagani, a partner in Curci-Pagani Music, had offered Piazzolla a 15-year contract in Rome to record anything he could write. His famous album Libertango was recorded in Milan in May 1974. In September recorded the album Summit (Reunión Cumbre) with the saxophonist Gerry Mulligan and an Italian orchestra, including jazz musicians such as bassist /arranger Pino Presti and drummer Tullio De Piscopo, in Milan. The album includes the composition Aire de Buenos Aires by Mulligan.

In 1975 he set up his Electronic Octet, an octet made up of bandoneon, electric piano and/or acoustic piano, organ, guitar, electric bass, drums, synthesizer and violin, which was later replaced by a flute or saxophone. Later that year Aníbal Troilo died and Piazzolla composed the Suite Troileana in his memory, a work in four parts, which he recorded with the Conjunto Electronico. At this time Piazzolla started a collaboration with the singer José Ángel Trelles, with whom he made a number of recordings.

In December 1976 he played at a concert at the Teatro Gran Rex in Buenos Aires, where he presented his work, “500 motivaciones”, written especially for the Conjunto Electronico, and in 1977 he played another memorable concert at the Olympia in Paris, with a new formation of the Conjunto Electronico.

In 1978 he formed his second Quintet, with which he would tour the world for 11 years, and which would make him world-renowned. He also returned to writing chamber music and symphonic works.

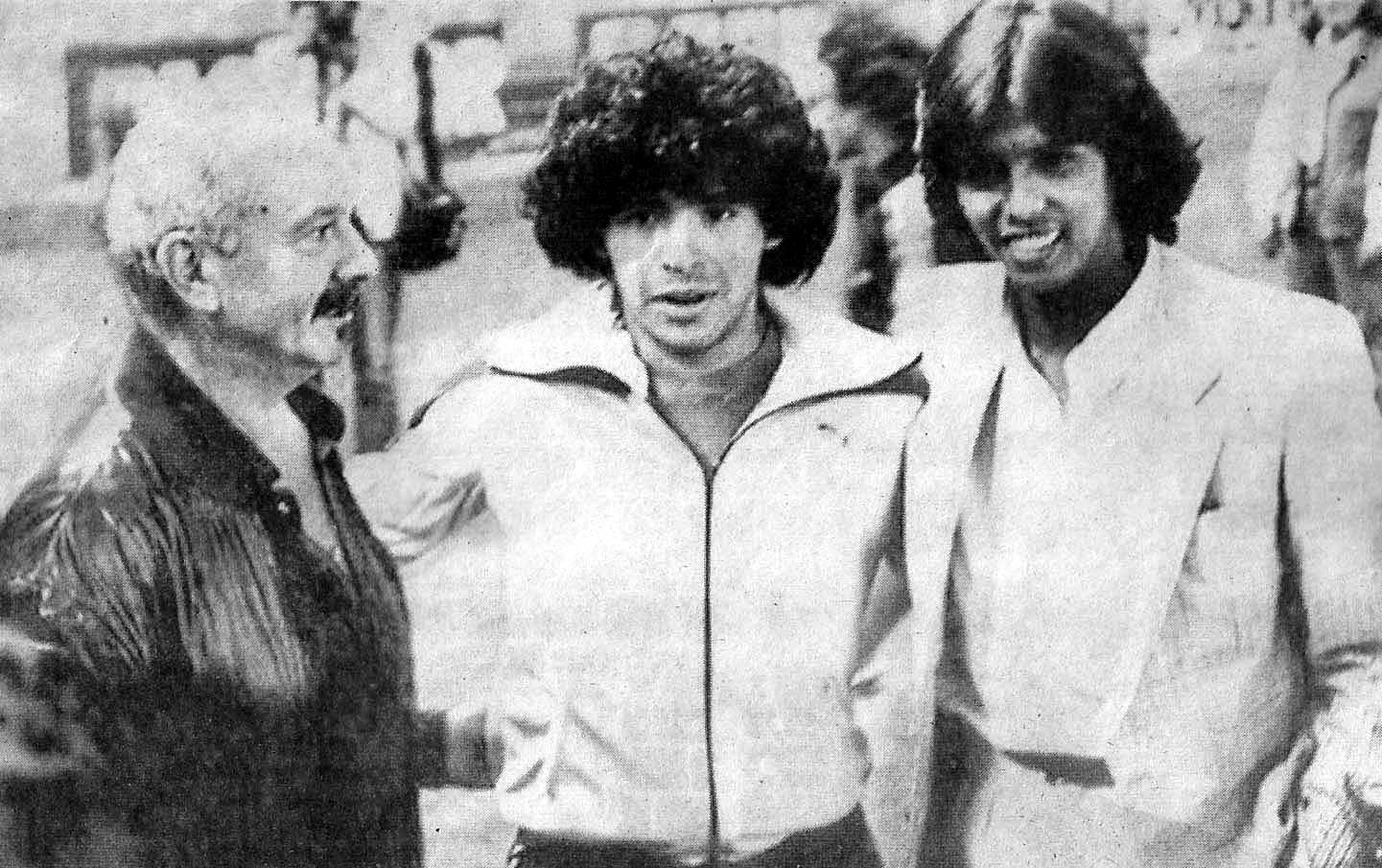
Piazzolla with football star Diego Maradona (center) and singer-songwriter Jairo in Paris, 1981

During the Argentine military dictatorship from 1976 to 1983, Piazzolla lived in Italy, but returned many times to Argentina and recorded there. On at least one occasion he lunched with the dictator Jorge Rafael Videla, as he recounts in his oral memoir:

[Interviewer:] One year before the Los Largartos issue you went to Videla's house and had lunch with him. Why did you accept that invitation?
[Piazzolla:] What invitation? They sent a couple of guys in black suits and a letter with my name on it that said that Videla expected me a particular day in a particular place [or else].
I have a book around someplace, with pictures of all the guests: Eladia Blázquez, Daniel Tinayre, Olga Ferri, the composer Juan Carlos Tauriello...painters, actors....

In 1985 he received the Platinum Konex Award, and in 1995 his family received the Honour Konex Award as the most important deceased musician of the decade in Argentina. He was also nominated for the Grammy Award and received the César Award.

=== Traveling the world ===
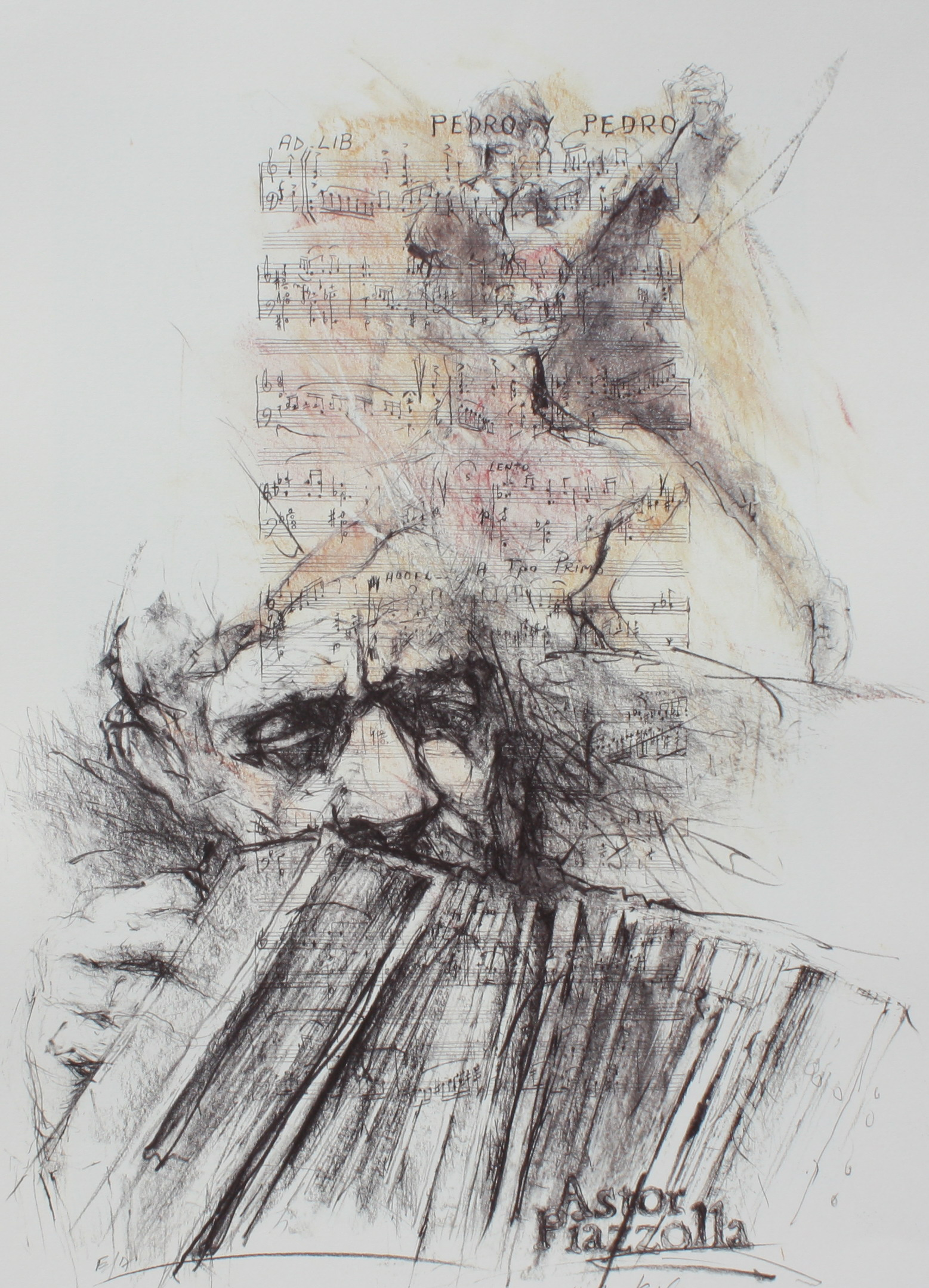
Astor Piazzolla (lithography)

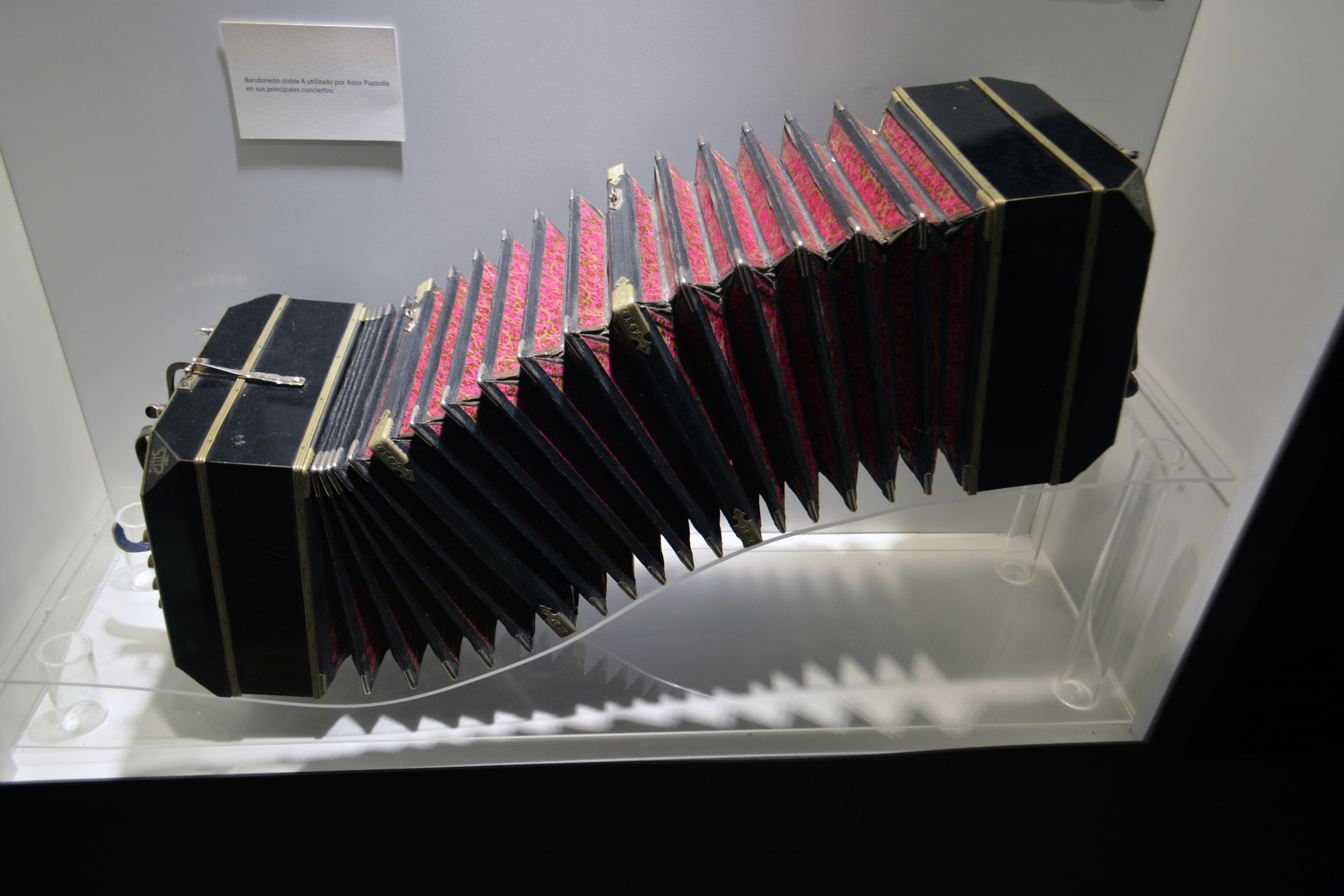
Astor Piazzolla's Doble A bandoneon used in his main concerts.

In 1982 he recorded the album Oblivion with an orchestra in Italy for the film Enrico IV, directed by Marco Bellocchio, and in May 1982, in the middle of the Falklands War, he played in a concert at the Teatro Regina, Buenos Aires with the second Quinteto and the singer Roberto Goyeneche. That same year he wrote Le Grand Tango for cello and piano, dedicated to Russian cellist Mstislav Rostropovich, which would be premiered by him in 1990 in New Orleans.

On 11 June 1983 he played a program of his music at the Teatro Colón in Buenos Aires. For the occasion he regrouped the Conjunto 9 and played solo with the Buenos Aires Philharmonic, directed by Pedro Ignacio Calderón. The programme included his three-movement Concierto para bandoneón y orquesta and his three-movement Concierto de Nacar.

On 4 July 1984, Piazzolla appeared with his Quinteto at the Montreal International Jazz Festival, the world's largest jazz festival, and on 29 September that same year they appeared with the Italian singer Milva at the Théâtre des Bouffes du Nord, Paris. His concert on 15 October 1984 at the Teatro Nazionale in Milan was recorded and released as the album Suite Punta del Este. At the end of that same year he performed in West-Berlin, and in theater Vredenburg in Utrecht, in the Netherlands, where VPRO-TV-director Theo Uittenbogaard recorded his Quinteto Tango Nuevo, playing, among other pieces, Adios Nonino, with as a backdrop – to Piazzolla's great pleasure – the extremely zoomed-in "live"' projection of his bandoneon playing.

In 1985 he was named Illustrious Citizen of Buenos Aires and premiered his Concerto for Bandoneon and Guitar (also known as Tribute to Liège), at the Fifth International Liège Guitar Festival on March 15, with the Liège Philharmonic Orchestra conducted by Leo Brouwer and Cacho Tirao on guitar. Piazzolla made his London debut with his second Quinteto at the Almeida Theatre in London at the end of June.

With the film score for El exilio de Gardel he won the French critics Cesar Award in Paris for best film music in 1986.

He appeared at the Montreux Jazz Festival, Montreux, Switzerland, with vibraphonist Gary Burton in July 1986 and, on 6 September 1987, gave a concert in New York's Central Park, in the city where he spent his childhood.

In September 1987 he recorded his Concierto para bandoneón y orquesta and Tres tangos para bandoneón y orquesta with Lalo Schifrin conducting the St. Luke's Orchestra, in the Richardson Auditorium at Princeton University.

In 1988, he wrote music for the film Sur. In May that year he recorded his album La Camorra in New York, a suite of three pieces, the last time he would record with the second Quinteto. During a tour of Japan with Milva he played at a concert at the Nakano Sun Plaza Hall in Tokyo on June 26, 1988, and that same year underwent a quadruple by-pass operation.

Early in 1989 he formed his Sexteto Nuevo Tango, his last ensemble, with two bandoneons, piano, electric guitar, bass and cello. Together they gave a concert at the Club Italiano in Buenos Aires in April, a recording of which was issued under the title of Tres minutos con la realidad. Later he appeared with them at the Teatro Opera in Buenos Aires in the presence of the newly elected Argentine President Carlos Menem on Friday, June 9. This would be Piazzolla's last concert in Argentina.

There followed a concert at the Royal Carre Theatre in Amsterdam with his Sexteto and Osvaldo Pugliese’s Orquesta on June 26, 1989, a live recording at the BBC Bristol Studios in June 1989, between concerts in Berlin and Rome, and a concert at the Wembley Conference Centre on June 30, 1989. On November 4, 1989, he gave a concert in Lausanne, Switzerland, at the Moulin à Danses and later that month he recorded his composition Five Tango Sensations, with the Kronos Quartet in the US on an album of the same name. This would be his last studio recording and was his second composition for the Kronos Quartet. His first Four, For Tango had been included in their 1988 album Winter Was Hard. Towards the end of the year he dissolved his sexteto and continued playing solo with classical string quartets and symphonic orchestras. He joined Anahi Carfi's Mantova String Quartet and toured Italy and Finland with them.

His 1982 composition Le grand tango, for cello and piano, was premiered in New Orleans by the Russian cellist Mstislav Rostropovich and the pianist Igor Uriash in 1990 and on July 3 he gave his last concert in Athens, Greece, with the Orchestra of Colours, conducted by founder-director Manos Hatzidakis.

Piazzolla’s work influenced musicians within tango and other musical traditions. Pianist Pablo Ziegler performed in Piazzolla’s second quintet and later continued performing nuevo tango with his own ensembles. Bandoneonist and composer Marcelo Nisinman studied under Piazzolla during his musical training in Buenos Aires. Brazilian guitarist and composer Sérgio Assad arranged Piazzolla’s compositions for guitar duo and performed them with his brother Odair. Argentine composer Osvaldo Golijov grew up listening to Piazzolla’s music, which was among his musical influences.

== Musical style ==
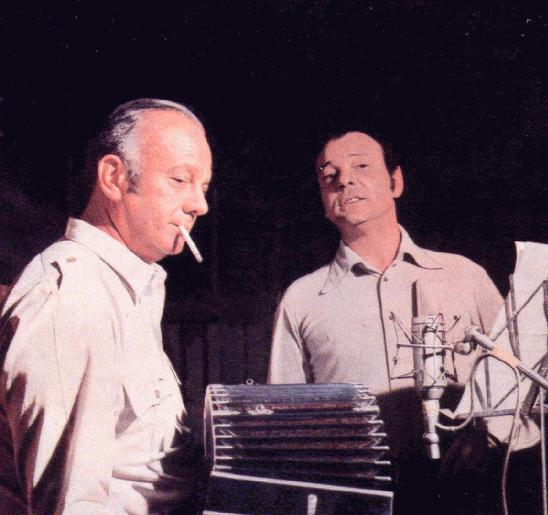
Piazzolla and Horacio Ferrer around 1970

Piazzolla's nuevo tango was distinct from the traditional tango in its incorporation of elements of jazz, its use of extended harmonies and dissonance, its use of counterpoint, and its ventures into extended compositional forms. As Argentine psychoanalyst Carlos Kuri has pointed out, Piazzolla's fusion of tango with this wide range of other recognizable Western musical elements was so successful that it produced a new individual style transcending these influences. It is precisely this success, and individuality, that makes it hard to pin down where particular influences reside in his compositions, but some aspects are clear. The use of the passacaglia technique of a circulating bass line and harmonic sequence, invented and much used in 17th- and 18th-century baroque music but also central to the idea of jazz changes, predominates in most of Piazzolla's mature compositions. Another clear reference to the baroque is the often complex and virtuosic counterpoint that sometimes follows strict fugal behavior but more often simply allows each performer in the group to assert his voice. A further technique that emphasises this sense of democracy and freedom among the musicians is improvisation, that is borrowed from jazz in concept, but in practice involves a different vocabulary of scales and rhythms that stay within the parameters of the established tango sound-world. Pablo Ziegler has been particularly responsible for developing this aspect of the style both within Piazzolla's groups and since the composer's death.

With the composition of Adiós Nonino in 1959, Piazzolla established a standard structural pattern for his compositions, involving a formal pattern of fast-slow-fast-slow-coda, with the fast sections emphasizing gritty tango rhythms and harsh, angular melodic figures and the slower sections usually making use of the string instrument in the group and/or Piazzolla's own bandoneon as lyrical soloists. The piano tends to be used throughout as a percussive rhythmic backbone, while the electric guitar either joins in this role or spins filigree improvisations; the double bass parts are usually of little interest, but provide an indispensable rugged thickness to the sound of the ensemble. The quintet of bandoneon, violin, piano, electric guitar and double bass was Piazzolla's preferred setup on two extended occasions during his career, and most critics consider it to be the most successful instrumentation for his works. This is due partly to its great efficiency in terms of sound – it covers or imitates most sections of a symphony orchestra, including the percussion, which is improvised by all players on the bodies of their instruments – and the strong expressive identity it permits each individual musician. With a style that is both rugged and intricate, such a setup augments the compositions' inherent characteristics.

Despite the prevalence of the quintet formation and the ABABC compositional structure, Piazzolla consistently experimented with other musical forms and instrumental combinations. In 1965 an album was released containing collaborations between Piazzolla and Jorge Luis Borges where Borges's poetry was narrated over very avant-garde music by Piazzolla including the use of dodecaphonic (twelve-tone) rows, free non-melodic improvisation on all instruments, and modal harmonies and scales. In 1968 Piazzolla wrote and produced an "operita", María de Buenos Aires, that employed a larger ensemble including flute, percussion, multiple strings and three vocalists, and juxtaposed movements in Piazzolla's own style with several pastiche numbers ranging from waltz and hurdy-gurdy to a piano/narrator bar-room scena straight out of Casablanca.

By the 1970s Piazzolla was living in Rome, managed by the Italian agent Aldo Pagani, and exploring a leaner, more fluid musical style drawing on more jazz influence, and with simpler, more continuous forms. Pieces that exemplify this new direction include Libertango and most of the Suite Troileana, written in memory of Aníbal Troilo. In the 1980s Piazzolla was wealthy enough, for the first time, to become relatively autonomous artistically, and wrote some of his most ambitious multi-movement works. These included Tango Suite for the virtuoso guitar duo Sergio and Odair Assad; Histoire du Tango, where a flutist and guitarist tell the history of tango in four chunks of music styled at thirty-year intervals; and La Camorra, a suite in three ten-minute movements, inspired by the Neapolitan crime family and exploring symphonic concepts of large-scale form, thematic development, contrasts of texture and massive accumulations of ensemble sound. After making three albums in New York with the second quintet and producer Kip Hanrahan, two of which he described on separate occasions as "the greatest thing I've done", he disbanded the quintet, formed a sextet with an extra bandoneon, cello, bass, electric guitar, and piano, and wrote music for this ensemble that was even more adventurous harmonically and structurally than any of his previous works (Preludio y Fuga; Sex-tet). Had he not suffered an incapacitating stroke on the way to Notre Dame mass in 1990, it is likely that he would have continued to use his popularity as a performer of his own works to experiment in relative safety with even more audacious musical techniques, while possibly responding to the surging popularity of non-Western musics by finding ways to incorporate new styles into his own. In his musical professionalism and open-minded attitude to existing styles he held the mindset of an 18th-century composing performer such as Handel or Mozart, who were anxious to assimilate all national "flavors" of their day into their own compositions, and who always wrote with both first-hand performing experience and a sense of direct social relationship with their audiences. This may have resulted in a backlash amongst conservative tango aficionados in Argentina, but in the rest of the West it was the key to his extremely sympathetic reception among classical and jazz musicians, both seeing some of the best aspects of their musical practices reflected in his work.

== Musical career ==
After leaving Troilo's orchestra in the 1940s, Piazzolla led numerous ensembles beginning with the 1946 Orchestra, the 1955 Octeto Buenos Aires, the 1960 "First Quintet", the 1971 Conjunto 9 ("Noneto"), the 1978 "Second Quintet" and the 1989 New Tango Sextet. As well as providing original compositions and arrangements, he was the director and bandoneon player in all of them. He also recorded the album Summit (Reunión Cumbre) with jazz baritone saxophonist Gerry Mulligan. His numerous compositions include orchestral work such as the Concierto para bandoneón, orquesta, cuerdas y percusión, Doble concierto para bandoneón y guitarra, Tres tangos sinfónicos and Concierto de Nácar para 9 tanguistas y orquesta, pieces for the solo classical guitar – the Cinco Piezas (1980), as well as song-form compositions that still today are well known by the general public in his country, including "Balada para un loco" (Ballad for a madman) and Adiós Nonino (dedicated to his father), which he recorded many times with different musicians and ensembles. Biographers estimate that Piazzolla wrote around 3,000 pieces and recorded around 500.

In 1981, singer/model/actress Grace Jones famously incorporated his "Libertango" into her hit song "I've Seen That Face Before" on her platinum selling "Nightclubbing" album. A Grammy nominated video was also filmed for her performance of the song. In 1984, he appeared with his Quinteto Tango Nuevo in West-Berlin, Germany and for television in Utrecht, Netherlands. In the summer of 1985 he performed at the Almeida Theatre in London for a week-long engagement. On September 6, 1987, his quintet gave a concert in New York's Central Park, which was recorded and, in 1994, released in compact disc format as The Central Park Concert.

== Personal life and death ==
Piazolla fell in love with a painter, Odetta Maria Wolff, known as Dedé, after they met at a tea party in 1940. They married in 1943, and had two children, Diana Irene (1943), and Daniel Hugo (1945). The marriage was rocky, but divorce was illegal in Argentina which slowed their ability to disengage. He left her in 1966 for Argentine singer Amelita Baltar, but he and Wolff were not able officially to divorce until 1988. He and Baltar lived together until the early 1970s. He suffered a heart attack in 1973, and split with Baltar in 1974. When he and Wolff were finally divorced, he married the singer and television personality Laura Escalada in 1988, and she took charge of his professional life in light of his medical needs. "This is my world, the love I've been looking for," he told writer Natalio Gorin. "Before I lived by going from flower to flower, as the tango says. Now I don't need any of that." He suffered a cerebral hemorrhage in Paris on August 4, 1990, which left him in a coma, and died in Buenos Aires, just under two years later on July 4, 1992, without having regained consciousness.

== Legacy ==
- Astor Piazzolla International Airport in Mar del Plata is named after him.
- The Buenos Aires music conservatory "Conservatorio Superior de Música de la Ciudad de Buenos Aires" carries his name.
- Google celebrated his 100th birthday on 11 March 2021 with a Google Doodle.

== Work ==
=== Ensembles ===
- Orquesta Típica (in English: Piazzolla's Traditional Orchestra), also known as the 1946 Orchestra, 1946–50.
- Orquesta de Cuerdas (in English: String Orchestra), 1955–58.
- Octeto Buenos Aires (in English: Buenos Aires Octet) 1955–58.
- Jazz Tango Quintet, 1959.
- Quinteto (in English: Quintet), also known as the first Quintet, 1960–70.
- Nuevo Octeto (in English: New Octet), 1963.
- Conjunto 9 (in English: Ensemble 9), aldo known as Noneto, 1971–72 & 1983.
- Conjunto Electronico (in English: Electronic Ensemble), also known as Electronic Octet, 1975.
- Quinteto Tango Nuevo (in English: New Tango Quintet), alsi known as the second Quintet, 1979–91.
- Sexteto Nuevo Tango (in English: New Tango Sextet), 1989–91.

=== Film music ===
- Con los mismos colores, 1949
- Bólidos de acero, 1950
- El Cielo en las manos, 1950
- Stella Maris, 1953
- Sucedió en Buenos Aires, 1954
- Los tallos amargos, 1955
- Marta Ferrari, 1956
- Continente blanco, 1957 (also known as Le Conquérant solitaire and Operación Antártida)
- Historia de una carta, 1957
- Una viuda difícil, 1957
- Violencia en la ciudad, 1957
- Operación Antartida, 1958
- Dos basuras, 1958
- Sábado a la noche, cine, 1960
- Las furias, 1960
- Quinto año nacional, 1961
- Detrás de la mentira, 1962
- Los que verán a Dios, 1963
- La fin del mundo, 1963
- Paula Cautiva, 1963
- Extraña ternura, 1964
- Con gusto a rabia, 1965
- Las locas del conventillo, 1966
- Los pirañas, 1967
- Crimen sin olvido, 1968
- La fiaca, 1969
- Breve cielo, 1969
- Pulsación, 1969
- Con alma y vida, 1970
- La ñata contra el vidrio, 1972
- Todo nudez será castigada, 1973
- Viaje de bodas, 1975
- Lumière, 1976
- Cadaveri eccelenti, 1976
- Il pleut sur Santiago, 1976
- ¿Qué es el otoño?, 1977
- Quand la ville s’éveille, 1977
- Armaguedón, 1977
- A Intrusa, 1979
- El infierno tan temido, 1980
- Volver, 1982
- Somos?, 1982
- Neon City, 1982
- Bella Donna, 1983
- Cuarteles de invierno, 1984
- Enrico IV, 1984
- El exilio de Gardel: Tangos, 1985
- Sur, 1988
- 12 Monkeys (Note: The score's composer, Paul Buckmaster, used Piazzolla's Suite Punta Del Este for the movie's main theme.), 1995
- Happy Together, 1997

=== Discography ===
- Two Argentinians in Paris (with Lalo Schifrin, 1955)
- Sinfonía de Tango (Orquesta de Cuerdas, 1955)
- Tango progresivo (Buenos Aires Octeto, 1957)
- Octeto Buenos Aires (Octeto Buenos Aires, 1957)
- Astor Piazzolla (Orquesta de Cuerdas, 1957)
- Tango in Hi-Fi (Orquesta de Cuerdas, 1957)
- Adiós Nonino (1960)
- Piazzolla Interpreta A Piazzolla (Quinteto, 1961)
- Piazzolla ... O No? (Vocals by Nelly Vázquez, Quinteto, 1961)
- Nuestro Tiempo (Vocals by Héctor De Rosas, Quinteto, 1962)
- Tango Contemporáneo (Nuevo Octeto, 1963)
- Tango Para Una Ciudad (Vocal by Héctor De Rosas, Quinteto, 1963)
- Concierto en el Philharmonic Hall de New York (Quinteto, 1965)
- El Tango (Jorge Luis Borges – Astor Piazzolla; Edmundo Rivero, Orquesta and Quinteto, 1965)
- La Guardia Vieja (1966)
- La Historia del Tango. La Guardia Vieja (Orquesta, 1967)
- La Historia del Tango. Época Romántica (Orquesta, 1967)
- ION Studios (1968)
- María de Buenos Aires (Orquesta, 1968)
- Piazzolla En El Regina (Quinteto, 1970)
- Original Tangos from Argentina Vol. 1 & 2 (solo bandeneon, 1970)
- Pulsación (Orquesta, 1970)
- Piazzolla-Troilo (Dúo de Bandoneónes, 1970)
- Concerto Para Quinteto (Quinteto, 1971)
- La Bicicleta Blanca (Amelita Baltar y Orquesta, 1971)
- En Persona (recitations by Horacio Ferrer, Astor Piazzolla, 1971)
- Música Popular Contemporánea de la Ciudad de Buenos Aires. Vol.1 & 2 (Conjunto 9, 1972)
- Roma (Conjunto 9, 1972)
- Libertango (Orquesta, 1974)
- Piazzolla and Amelita Baltar (1974)
- Summit (Reunión Cumbre) (with Gerry Mulligan, Orquesta, 1974)
- Suite Troileana-Lumiere (Orquesta, 1975)
- Buenos Aires (1976)
- Il Pleut Sur Santiago (Orquesta, 1976)
- Piazzolla & El Conjunto Electrónico (Conjunto Electrónico, 1976)
- Piazzolla en el Olimpia de Paris (Conjunto Electrónico, 1977)
- Chador (1978)
- Lo Que Vendrá (Orquesta de Cuerdas and Quinteto Tango Nuevo, 1979)
- Piazzolla-Goyeneche En Vivo, Teatro Regina (Quinteto Tango Nuevo, 1982)
- Oblivion (Orquesta, 1982)
- Suite Punta Del Este (Quinteto, 1982)
- Live in Lugano (Quinteto, 1983)
- SWF Rundfunkorchester (1983)
- Concierto de Nácar – Piazzolla en el Teatro Colón (Conjunto 9 y Orquesta Filarmónica del Teatro Colón, 1983)
- Live in Colonia (Quinteto Tango Nuevo, 1984)
- Montreal Jazz Festival (Quinteto Tango Nuevo, 1984)
- The Vienna Concert (Quinteto Tango Nuevo, 1984), CD: 1991.
- Enrico IV (soundtrack to the film of the same name, 1984)
- Green Studio (1984)
- Teatro Nazionale di Milano (1984)
- El Exilio de Gardel (soundtrack to the film of the same name, Quinteto, 1986)
- Tango: Zero Hour (Quinteto Tango Nuevo, 1986)
- Tristezas de un Doble A (Quinteto Tango Nuevo, 1986), Vienna, Konzerthaus, CD: 1991.
- Central Park Concert (Quinteto, 1987)
- Concierto para Bandoneón – Tres Tangos with the Orchestra of St. Luke's, Lalo Schifrin (conductor), Princeton University (1987)
- The New Tango (with Gary Burton, Atlantic, 1987)
- The Rough Dancer and the Cyclical Night (Tango Apasionado) (1987)
- Sur (soundtrack of the film of the same name, Quinteto, 1988)
- Live in Tokyo 1988 (Quinteto Tango Nuevo, 1988)
- La Camorra (Quinteto Tango Nuevo, 1989)
- Luna. Live in Amsterdam (Sexteto Nuevo Tango, 1989)
- Lausanne Concert (Sexteto Nuevo Tango, 1989)
- Live at the BBC (Sexteto Nuevo Tango, 1989)
- Famille d'Artistes (1989)
- Hommage a Liege: Concierto para bandoneón y guitarra/Historia del Tango (1988) with Liège Philharmonic Orchestra conducted by Leo Brouwer. The concerto was performed by Piazzolla with Cacho Tirao, the Historia by Guy Lukowski and Marc Grawels.
- Bandoneón Sinfónico (1990)
- Five Tango Sensations (Astor Piazzolla and the Kronos Quartet, 1991)
- Original Tangos from Argentina (1992)
- Lausanne Concert (Sexteto Nuevo Tango, 1993)
- Central Park Concert 1987 (Quinteto, 1994)
- El Nuevo Tango de Buenos Aires (Quinteto, 1995)
- 57 Minutos con la Realidad (Sexteto Nuevo Tango, 1996)
- Tres Minutos con la Realidad (Sexteto Nuevo Tango, 1997)
