= Piazzolla's Orquesta Típica =

Tango orchestra formed in 1946

Piazzolla's Orquesta Típica, also known as the 1946 Orchestra, was a tango orchestra formed in 1946 in Buenos Aires by the Argentine bandoneon player Astor Piazzolla. This was Piazzolla's first orchestra of his own and from this spring board he would later go on to pioneer a new approach to the genre with his Octeto Buenos Aires.

== History ==
Early in his career Piazzolla played in a number of orquesta típicas, including that of the renowned bandoneonist Aníbal Troilo from 1939. During this period he began to study classical orchestration with Alberto Ginastera, the eminent Argentine composer, and took piano lessons with the Argentine classical pianist Raúl Spivak. Piazzolla combined this with a gruelling performing schedule in the tango clubs at night and between 1944 and 1946 he went on to lead the orchestra of the tango singer and bandoneonist Francisco Fiorentino.

Feeling restricted by the limitations of traditional tango, Piazzolla formed his Orquesta Típica in 1946 and began to experiment with a new approach to the orchestration and musical content of tango. A number of formations for the orchestra were tried including: Astor Piazzolla, Roberto Di Filippo, Angel Genta, and Fernando Tell (bandoneon); Hugo Baralis, Cacho Gianni, Juan Bibiloni, and F. Lucero (violin); Atilio Stampone (piano), Angel Molo (cello) and Pepe Diaz (double bass).

Over the next two years, Piazzolla recorded 30 pieces with this orchestra, mostly new arrangements of traditional tangos such as Taconeando, Inspiración, Tierra querida, La rayuela and El recodo, but also a number of his own compositions, including El Disbande (his first formal composition), Pigmalion, Villeguita, and Se Armo. His works would quickly become classics in the repertoire of some of the most popular tango orchestras of the day, including those of Anibal Troilo, Osvaldo Fresedo and Jose Basso.

The young Piazzolla's music established itself as a distinct and contemporary sound which began to provoke comment amongst traditional tangueros . By 1950 he felt the need to disband the orchestra and to try something different, not even convinced at this stage in his life that he should make his career in tango. He concentrated now on the study of classical music, including a year in Paris with the French classical composition teacher Nadia Boulanger, before returning to Buenos Aires where he would finally commit himself to tango with the founding of his next ensemble, Octeto Buenos Aires, in 1955. This would put him in the vanguard of tango and lead him into a head-on collision with the tango music establishment.
