= Histoire du Tango =

1985 composition by Argentine tango composer Ástor Piazzolla

Histoire du Tango is a composition by tango composer Ástor Piazzolla, originally scored for flute and guitar in 1985 and published in 1986. It is one of Piazzolla's best known compositions and is often played with different combinations, including violin or double bass substituted for the flute, and piano, harp or marimba substituted for the guitar.

== Background ==
Piazzolla aimed throughout his career to bring tango music the concert halls of Europe and America. His music teacher, Nadia Boulanger, encouraged him to apply the lessons of his study with her to tango music. Piazzolla's Histoire du Tango is his only work for flute and guitar – two instruments which were used to play tango music in its early period, the decades around the turn of the 20th century.

== Form ==
Histoire du Tango attempts to convey the history and evolution of the tango in four movements: Bordel 1900, Café 1930, Nightclub 1960, and Concert d'aujourd'hui. Piazzolla provided program notes that expand on the individual movements:

Bordel, 1900: The tango originated in Buenos Aires in 1882. It was first played on the guitar and flute. Arrangements then came to include the piano, and later, the concertina. This music is full of grace and liveliness. It paints a picture of the good natured chatter of the French, Italian, and Spanish women who peopled those bordellos as they teased the policemen, thieves, sailors, and riffraff who came to see them. This is a high-spirited tango.

Café, 1930: This is another age of the tango. People stopped dancing it as they did in 1900, preferring instead simply to listen to it. It became more musical, and more romantic. This tango has undergone total transformation: the movements are slower, with new and often melancholy harmonies. Tango orchestras come to consist of two violins, two concertinas, a piano, and a bass. The tango is sometimes sung as well.

Nightclub, 1960: This is a time of rapidly expanding international exchange, and the tango evolves again as Brazil and Argentina come together in Buenos Aires. The bossa nova and the new tango are moving to the same beat. Audiences rush to the night clubs to listen earnestly to the new tango. This marks a revolution and a profound alteration in some of the original tango forms.

Concert d'aujourd'hui (Modern-Day Concert): Certain concepts in tango music become intertwined with modern music. Bartok, Stravinsky, and other composers reminisce to the tune of tango music. This [is] today’s tango, and the tango of the future as well.
