= Cacho Tirao =

Argentine guitarist

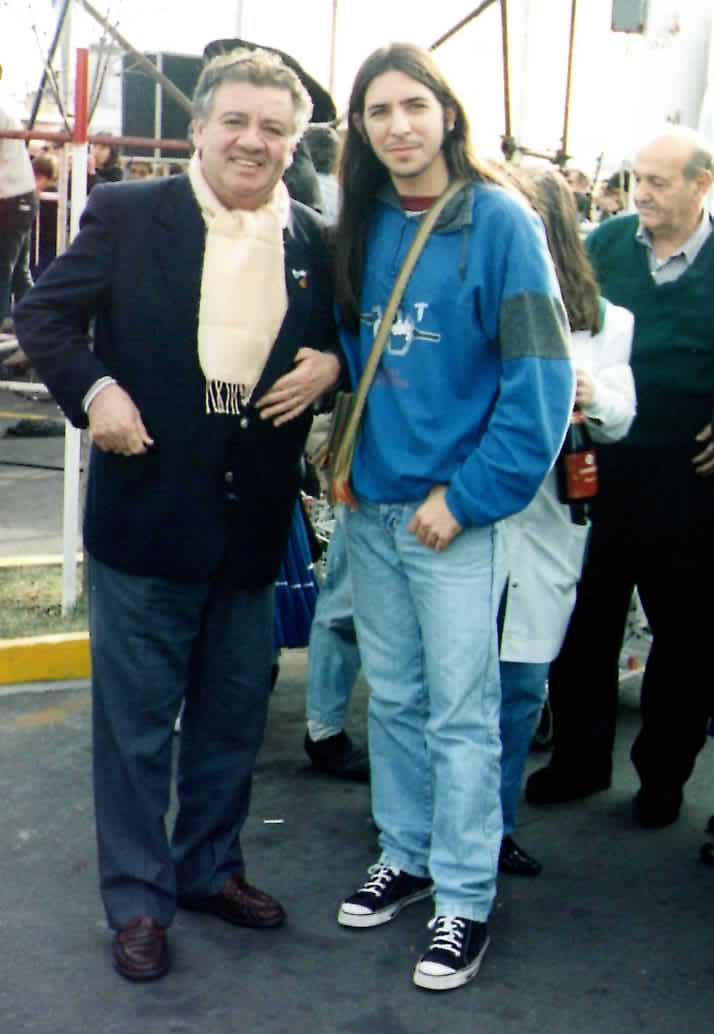
Cacho Tirao (left)

Oscar Emilio Tirao (April 5, 1941 – May 30, 2007), known as Cacho Tirao, was an Argentine guitarist. He was a member of the Astor Piazzolla quintet.

== Biography ==
Tirao was born on April 5, 1941, and began playing guitar at the age of four, with his father. At age seven he won his first prize, for a presentation in the artistic section of Radio Mitre. At only 16 years old he was included as a soloist in the orchestra of the Teatro Argentino de La Plata. Member of Astor Piazzolla's epic quintet, Tirao worked among others with Osvaldo Tarantino, Dino Saluzzi and Rodolfo Mederos. He accompanied Josephine Baker and left about 40 records, one of which sold a million copies. He is also the composed many pieces, including the Concert for Guitar and Symphonic Orchestra "Conciertango Buenos Aires" written for Joaquin Rodrigo and which premiered in Belgium in 1985.

In February 1986, his daughter Alejandra playing with her fourteen-year-old brother Gabriel, took a revolver that she believed to be a toy and shot him dead. The tragedy had lasting effects on Tirao, first a persistent asthma that lasted until the end and then, a hemiplegia.

During the 1970s he led a spectacular concert series, which consistently drew large audiences. During those years he also began performing live with Paco de Lucía, who later became a great friend. In 2000 Cacho Tirao collapsed during a concert at the House of Culture of Adrogué. After six years without performing, resulting from a cardiovascular incident in 2000 that caused hemiplegia, Tirao resumed performing and at the end of 2006 recorded his last album, "Renacer", released in January and that Thought to present live in Buenos Aires.

This album, which includes a series of themes such as "Le petit tango", "Third time" and "Teresa, my rebirth", dedicated to his wife, also included his daughter Alejandra on vocals. Cacho Tirao died on May 30, 2007, at his home in Buenos Aires.

== Artistic trajectory ==
He stood out as a virtuoso soloist, composed and performed tango, milonga, zamba, cueca, chacarera and other diverse musical genres. Among his particular compositions stand out "The Milonga of Don Taco", in memory of his father; "The milonga of the desired child" dedicated to his grandson and the excellent bossa nova titled "Sonveri", recorded for CBS in 1979 in the album "Cacho Tirao ... Sin Lugar a Dudas". He recorded 36 albums, the first as a soloist in 1971 "Mi guitarra, tú y yo"; And the last in 2006, "Renacer", after recovering from a hemiplegia suffered from a stroke. He reached high levels of popularity in the 1970s, while conducting the television series "Recitals Spectacular", to the point that one of his recordings in 1978 sold more than one million plates.

== Discography ==
1970: "My guitar ... You and I" - CBS

1971: "Only My Guitar" - CBS

1972: "Music of Buenos Aires - This is ... Cacho Tirao" - CBS

1972: "Latin American Guitar" - CBS

1972: "The City of All" - Together with Raúl Lavié - CBS

1974: "Pure Music" - CBS

1975: "Latin American Guitar Volume 2" - CBS

1976: "Classically Young" CBS

1976: "Recital" - CBS

1977: "Song Time" - CBS

1978: "Buenos Aires Concert for Guitar and Orchestra" - CBS

1978: "The Greatest Hits of Cacho Tirao" - CBS

1978: "Happy 1978 Perel" - CBS

1979: "Pure Music Vol. 2" - CBS

1979: "Without a doubt" - CBS

1980: "Encuentro" - Together with Jorge Padín and Manolo Juarez - CBS

1980: "Special Selection of Cacho Tirao" - CBS

1981: "Homage to Carlos Gardel" - CBS

1982: "Recital 2" - CBS

1983: "Big Hits Vol. 2" - CBS

1983: "Images" - MICROFON ARGENTINA S.A.

1984: "Cacho Tirao interprets La Nueva Trova" - MICROFON ARGENTINA S.A.

1990: "Adiós Nonino" - MICROFON ARGENTINA S.A.

1999: "History of Tango" - Together with Julián Vat

2000: "My Best 30 Performances" - SONY MUSIC

2002: "17 Forever Favorite Classics" - ANS

2003: "Chiquilín de Bachín" - SONY MUSIC

2004: "The Essentials" - SONY MUSIC

????: "And The Greatest Hits"

2006: "The Argentine guitar" - EPSA MUSIC

2006: "Beaches of the East" - LE CHANT DU MONDE

2007: "Renacer" - UTOPIA PRODUCCIONES

2009: "Los Elegidos" - SONY MUSIC

2011: "My Good Tangos Dear" - FONOCAL
