= Horacio Malvicino =

Argentine guitarist (1929–2023)

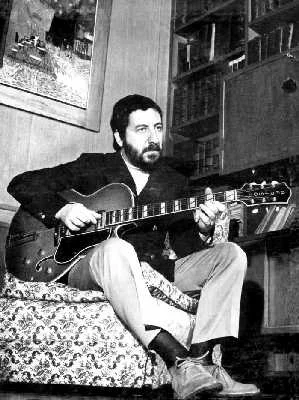
- Horacio Malvicino

Background information
- Birth name: Horacio Esteban Malvicino
- Also known as: Don Nobody, Alain Debray, Gino Bonetti, Malveta
- Born: 20 October 1929; Concordia, Entre Ríos, Argentina
- Origin: Argentina
- Died: 21 November 2023 (aged 94); Concordia, Entre Ríos, Argentina
- Genres: Jazz, Bebop, Bossa Nova, Latin Jazz
- Occupation(s): Musician, Guitarist, Composer
- Instrument(s): Guitar, Electric guitar
- Years active: 1949–2023
- Labels: RCA Victor, Microfon

Horacio Malvicino (20 October 1929 – 21 November 2023) was an Argentine jazz and tango electric guitarist and composer who played for many years with the tango musician Ástor Piazzolla in several of his ensembles.

== Biography ==
The son of Esteban Malvicino, a railway employee, Horacio grew up in Concordia where, between the ages of 6 and 14, he was taught to play the guitar by Augustin Satalia. His teacher would only allow him to play classical music and in those days jazz was rarely heard in the city. However, he got to know the music of the jazz guitarists Charlie Christian and Django Reinhardt and the jazz clarinetist Benny Goodman, by listening to a friend’s records of these musicians. He also listened to the tango music of Ástor Piazzolla's Orquesta Típica on Radio Splendid.

Arriving in Buenos Aires in 1947, he studied medicine for five years until music took over his life and he became part of the bop generation centred on the Bop Club Argentino. This venue was frequented by the Argentine jazz tenor saxophonist Gato Barbieri and Argentine pianist Lalo Schifrin. It was here that the first attempts to develop modern jazz in Argentina took place in response to the great changes in the jazz world, initiated by the American jazz saxophonist Charlie Parker.

By the time Piazzolla met Malvicino for the first time in 1954, improvising in the Bop Club, Malvicino had already played with several orquesta típicas of the time including those of Fernando Roca, Eduardo Armani and René Cóspito. In 1955, he joined Piazzolla’s Octeto Buenos Aires which would pioneer nuevo tango, a new approach to tango, until then dominated by the traditional orquesta típicas of the 1930s and 1940s. This would mark a watershed in the history of tango and set Piazzolla on a collision course with the tango establishment. The jazz-like improvisations of Malvicino on electric guitar in, for example, Piazzolla's 1955 composition Marron y Azul, had never been heard before in tango.

A long association with Piazzolla would see Malvicino join his first Quinteto in 1960, where he alternated with Oscar López Ruiz, his Octeto Electronico in 1976, his second Quinteto in 1978 and his Sexteto Nuevo Tango in 1989. Malvicino travelled the world with Piazzolla and his ensembles and together they recorded 15 albums.

From a young age, Malvicino has been an outstanding sight reader and arranger of music and has worked as musical director for the Argentine recording label, Disc Jockey, the international recording label RCA Records and for the Argentine television channel, Canal 11.

During the 1960s he formed his own ensemble, the Horacio Malvicino Jazz Quintet. Over the years he has played various genres of music with many of the great names in the music world including Dizzy Gillespie, Gary Burton, Miles Davis, Antônio Carlos Jobim, Joao Gilberto, Susana Rinaldi, Milva, Tanguito, Los Chalchaleros, Palito Ortega, and Plácido Domingo. He has composed music for more than 90 Argentine films and theatrical works and in 1998 was awarded first prize by SADAIC for his film music.

Nicknamed Malveta by his friends, he has worked under 15 pseudonyms including Alain Debray (Alain after the French actor Alain Delon and Debray after the French revolutionary Régis Debray) and Don Nadie (Don Nobody), typically when playing music outside the world of jazz.

Horacio Malvicino and his wife, Graciela, had two sons, Marcelo and Horacio. With a lifelong interest in horses inherited from his father, he ran his own stud farm, San Antonio, for breeding race horses.

In 2018, he was named an Personalidad Destacada de la Cultura ("Outstanding Cultural Figure") in the City of Buenos Aires for his musical career and his work in defending the rights of musicians. He was also awarded the Tagini Award for Recording Career in 2022, granted by the Academia Nacional del Tango.

In 2008, Malvicino published a book entitled El Tano y Yo, where he recorded stories of his musical career as an electric guitarist in Piazzolla’s various ensembles, and was vice-president of the Argentine Interpreters Association. In 2014, he was honored by the government of the City of Buenos Aires.

Horacio Malvicino died on 21 November 2023, at the age of 94.

== Sources ==
- Ástor Piazzolla, A Memoir, Natalio Gorin, Amadaeus, 2001.
- El Tano y Yo, Horacio Malvicino, Corregidor, 2008.
