= Juan de Dios Filiberto National Orchestra of Argentine Music =

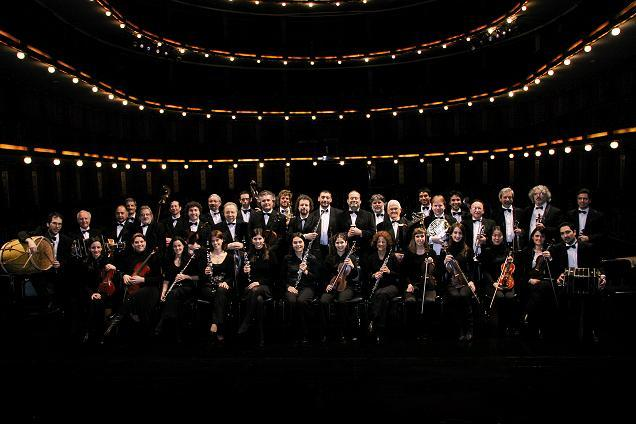
The Juan de Dios Filiberto National Orchestra of Argentine Music

The Juan de Dios Filiberto National Orchestra of Argentine Music (Spanish: Orquesta Nacional de Música Argentina Juan de Dios Filiberto) is the national pops orchestra of Argentina.

== Overview ==
The orchestra was established by the Buenos Aires government as the Municipal Popular Orchestra of Folk Art in 1939. The original ensemble of 14 musicians had been organized as the Orquesta Porteña in 1932 by tango composer Juan de Dios Filiberto, who had earned renown for his 1926 composition, Caminito. President Juan Perón reinaugurated the group as the National Popular Music Orchestra in 1948, increasing the ensemble to 40 members; Filiberto remained its music director until his retirement in 1959.

Juan de Dios Filiberto died in 1964; ten years after his death and in his honor, the Juan de Dios Filiberto National Orchestra of Argentine Music was created with its venue in the Cervantes Theatre. Maintained by the National Culture Secretariat, its 40 musicians are each music instructors in their respective instruments. Part of the National Arts Commission's annual events calendar since 2004, the orchestra's conductors have included maestros José Rosa, Osvaldo Requena, Osvaldo Piro, and since 2000, Atilio Stampone.
