= La Camorra =

Musical composition by Ástor Piazzolla

La Camorra is the name of a three-movement suite for tango ensemble composed by Ástor Piazzolla. It was inspired by the Neapolitan criminal organization Camorra and represents Piazzolla's most ambitious compositional statement in length and large-scale musical form, though not in harmony or timbre. The composer referred to the recording made with his Quinteto Nuevo Tango (in English: New Tango Quintet, often loosely referred to as his second quintet) in 1988 in New York City as "the greatest thing I did", though it was not clear whether he meant as a composition or as a performance/recording. The lineup for this recording was Ástor Piazzolla (bandoneon), Pablo Ziegler (piano), Fernando Suarez Paz (violin), Hector Console (double bass) and Horacio Malvicino, Sr. (guitar). This would prove to be the Quintet's last recording and Piazzolla would put together his final ensemble, the Sexteto Nuevo Tango (New Tango Sextet), that same year.
