= Francisco de Caro =

Argentine pianist and composer

Fancisco de Caro
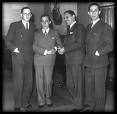
- Julio Rosenberg, Julio De Caro, Luis Díaz, and Francisco de Caro

Background information
- Born: 23 March 1898; Buenos Aires, Argentina
- Died: 31 July 1976 (aged 78) Buenos Aires, Argentina
- Genres: Tango
- Occupations: Pianist; Composer; Arranger
- Instrument: Piano

Francisco de Caro (Spanish pronunciation: [fɾanˈsisko ðe ˈkaɾo], 23 March 1898 – 31 July 1976), was an Argentine pianist and composer. He is considered the most important representative of the tango romanza genre. He also performed in concert with his brothers Julio and Emilio de Caro in the Julio De Caro Orchestra.

== Works ==
- Flores negras.
- Luciérnaga.
- Mala pinta.
- Loca bohemia.
- Triste.
- Páginas muertas.
- Sueño azul.
- Dos lunares.
- Un poema.
- Bibelot.
- El bajel.
- Pura labia.
- Colombina.
- Por un beso.
- Poema de amor
- Aquel amor.
- Don Antonio.
- Mala pata.
- Adiós tristeza.
- Mi diosa.
- Luz divina.
- Mi encanto
- Pura labia
- Don Antonio
- A palada
- Era buena la paisana
- Percanta arrepentida
- Bizcochito
- Gringuita
- La cañada
