= El cielo en las manos =

El Cielo en las manos
- Written by: Homero Cárpena; Enrique De Thomas; Humberto de la Rosa
- Cinematography: Enrique Wallfisch
- Edited by: Rosalino Caterbeti; Jorge Levillotti
- Release date: 1950
- Running time: 89 minute
- Country: Argentina
- Language: Spanish

El Cielo en las manos is a 1950 Argentine film directed by Enrique de Thomas during the classical era of Argentine cinema. The film is also remembered for its music by Astor Piazzola.

== Cast ==
- Oscar Casco as Raúl
- Perla Mux as Elba
- Lea Conti as Graciana
- Orestes Caviglia asDirector
- Homero Cárpena as Raúl
- Héctor Ferraro
- Luis Macchi
- Haydée Larroca as Anita
- Eloy Álvarez as Papá Ginzo
- Pedro Laxalt as Juan
- Mario Giusti as Charleson
- Lois Blue as Raúl's lover
- Semillita as Almacenero
- Edmundo Rivero as Singer
- Alberto Fassi
