= Francisco Fiorentino =

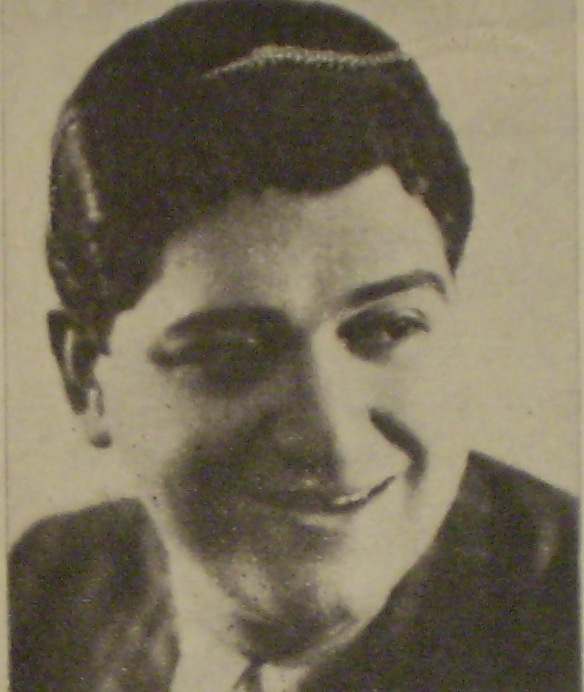
- Francisco Fiorentino in 1937

Background information
- Born: Francisco José Castro; 23 September 1905; San Telmo, Buenos Aires, Argentina
- Died: 11 September 1955 (aged 49) Mendoza Province, Argentina
- Genres: Tango
- Occupation: Singer
- Years active: 1920s–1951

Francisco Fiorentino (23 September 1905 – 11 September 1955) was an Argentine tango singer.

== Life ==
Francisco Fiorentino began his career as a bandoneonist but later went on to perform as a estribillista for various orchestras. The estribillista was the orchestra singer who, in the 1920s and 1930s, would sing only a fragment of the lyrics—specifically the chorus—without having much prominence. In that role, he sang for the orchestras of Juan Carlos Cobián, Francisco Canaro, Juan D’Arienzo, Pedro Maffia, and Roberto Zerrillo.

In 1937 Fiorentino joined Aníbal Troilo’s orchestra. His collaboration with Troilo marked a significant advancement in his career, as he became the orchestra's leading vocalist and gained wider recognition. Initially performing as an estribillista, Fiorentino gradually took on a larger vocal role, singing substantial portions of the lyrics rather than just the chorus. His voice, characterized by a distinctive tango style, porteño phrasing, and emotional delivery, became a defining element of the orchestra's sound during this period, which is considered the peak of his artistic success.

His artistic partnership with Troilo lasted six years; he debuted on July 1, 1937, at the Marabú cabaret and parted ways in March 1944.

He formed his own orchestra, with Astor Piazzolla as conductor and arranger, introducing an innovative approach that was considered avant-garde at the time. They recorded 22 tracks, but did not achieve the expected recognition. Piazzolla was later replaced by bandoneonist and arranger Ismael Spitalnik, with whom two additional tracks were recorded.

Fiorentino experienced a decline in his artistic career and performed with the orchestras of José Basso and Alberto Mancione, among others, making a few recordings. In 1951, he joined the ensemble of pianist José Puglia and bandoneonist Edgardo Pedroza in Uruguay, with whom he made his final three recordings in November of that year.

In 1955, before traveling to Mendoza, he told a friend: “When I return from the tour, I have a job lined up that—if it happens—is the best thing that could happen to me: El Gordo Pichuco is going to have me record with the Troilo-Grela quartet. Isn’t that wonderful?”

On the night of September 10, 1955—ten days before his 50th birthday—he performed at a benefit dance at the Alfonso Bernal school in the Los Árboles district of the town of Rivadavia, Mendoza, located 35 km southeast of Mendoza City and 950 km west of Buenos Aires. In the early morning, he and several musician friends set off on their return journey by car. However, instead of heading toward National Route 7, they took a gravel road westward. About 30 minutes later, the car overturned while crossing the Tiburcio Benegas dam bridge over the Tunuyán River (which was shallow at that time). The part of the vehicle in which the singer was traveling ended up submerged in a shallow, muddy ditch—only a few centimeters deep. "Fiore" had the misfortune of losing consciousness from the impact and remained with his face partially submerged, ultimately drowning.

== Films ==
- Prisioneros de una noche (1962)
