= History of the tango =

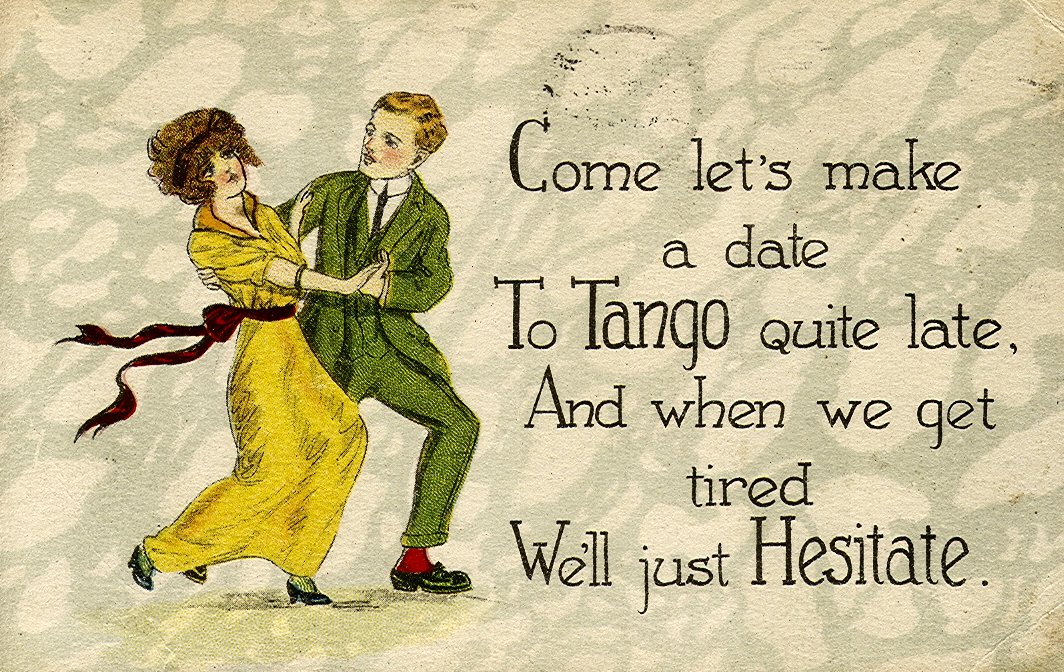
Tango postcard, c. 1919

Tango, a distinctive tango dance and the corresponding musical style of tango music, began in the working-class port neighborhoods of Buenos Aires (Argentina) and Montevideo (Uruguay); spanning both sides of the Rio de la Plata.

== Etymology ==
There are numbers of theories about the origin of the word "tango". One of the more popular in recent years has been that it came from the Niger–Congo languages of Africa. Another theory is that the word "tango", already in common use in Andalusia to describe a style of music, lent its name to a completely different style of music in Argentina and Uruguay.

== Origin ==
The Tango derives from the Cuban habanera, the Argentine milonga and Uruguayan candombe, and is said to contain elements from the African community in Buenos Aires, influenced both by ancient African rhythms and the music from Europe. These African rhythms are thought to come from Uruguayan candombe, which was characterized by energetic, "jerky" movements. Conversely, the milonga was a fusion of the Spanish-Cuban habanera and the imported European polka. The mazurka is another European element thought to have a hand in the tango's development. It is thought that, over time, these elements intersected in the outer districts of Buenos Aires and developed into the Tango.

Even though the present forms developed in Argentina and Uruguay from the mid 19th century, there are earlier written records of Tango dances in Cuba and Spain, while there is a flamenco Tangos dance that may share a common ancestor in a minuet-style European dance. All sources stress the influence of the African communities and their rhythms, while the instruments and techniques brought in by European immigrants played a major role in its final definition, relating it to the salon music styles to which Tango would contribute back at a later stage, when it became fashionable in early 20th century Paris.

=== Impact of immigration policy ===
In Argentina, the word Tango seems to have first been used in the 1890s. In 1902, the Teatro Opera started to include tango in their balls. Initially tango was just one of the many dances practiced locally, but it soon became popular throughout society, as theatres and street barrel organs spread it from the suburbs to the working-class slums, which were packed with hundreds of thousands of European immigrants. The development of Tango had influences from the cultures of several peoples that came together in these melting pots of ethnicities. For this reason, Tango is often referred to as the music of the immigrants to Argentina.

In the late 19th and early 20th centuries, Argentina experienced a significant wave of immigration that transformed its demographic composition. The immigration policy at the time was shaped by the Argentine elites’ desire to promote economic growth, their need to populate its vast territories, their aspiration to become a modern and civilized nation, as well as their racial and nationalist ideologies that sought to establish a homogenous and European-based population. To attract immigrants, the Argentine government implemented various measures, such as offering free land, providing financial incentives, and establishing immigration agencies in Europe.

However, this influx of diverse immigrants also led to social tensions and conflicts which engendered nationalist movements that sought to promote a “pure” Argentine identity aimed to exclude the more inferior immigrants. Under the Argentine government's efforts to Europeanize and modernize the country, those who did not fit the “pure” and civilized image of the Argentine identity were excluded from urban centers like Buenos Aires and gradually pushed to the arrabal, the suburbs between urban and rural areas. It was in these arrabales that different marginalized groups converged while expressing themselves in dances. They frequently met in “tangos” where whites and people of color played music and danced together. Afro-Argentines and the other working-class populations were especially crucial in shaping the emergence of tango by combining the different influences, including the milonga, the condombe, and payada.

=== National symbol ===
At the beginning of its history, tango was looked down upon by the Argentine elites for a number of reasons. First of all, tango's associations with marginalized groups, especially the immigrants and people of African descent, who were considered lower-class and uncivilized, made tango the dance form seem vulgar and immoral, thus unsuitable for respectable society. Additionally, tango was also closely associated with brothels and bars of Buenos Aires, which the elites also considered disreputable. Many of the early tango lyrics and moves were considered to be too sexually suggestive, exacerbating the elites’ disdain for the dance. These characteristics of tango significantly deviated from the Argentine elites’ nationalist agenda to promote an image of Argentine identity that emphasized European sophistication and refinement. Consequently, the elites saw tango as a threat to their cultural hegemony.

During the period of 1903–1910, over a third of the 1,000 gramophone records released were of tango music, and tango sheet music sold in large quantities. In about 1870, the bandoneon was introduced to Buenos Aires from Germany, and it became linked inextricably with tango music starting in about 1910. In 1912, Juan "Pacho" Maglio was very popular with his recorded tangos featuring the bandoneon accompanied by flute, violin and guitar. Between 1910 and 1920, tango featured on 2,500 of the 5,500 records released.

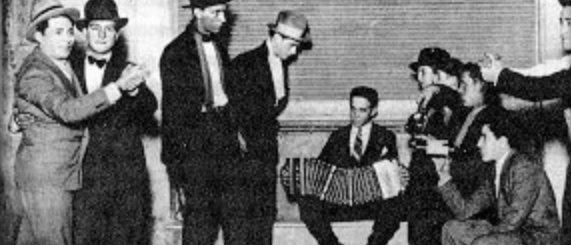
Men in Buenos Aires dance and play tango (ca. 1900)

By 1912, dancers and musicians from Buenos Aires travelled to Europe and the first European tango craze took place in Paris, soon followed by London, Berlin, and other capitals. Towards the end of 1913, it hit New York in the US and Finland. These exported versions of tango were modified to have less body contact ("Ballroom Tango"); however, the dance was still thought shocking by many, as had earlier been the case with dances such as the waltz. In 1922, guidelines were first set for the "English" (international) style of ballroom tango, but it lost popularity in Europe to new dances including the foxtrot and samba, and as dancing as a whole declined due to the growth of cinema.

As the dance form became wildly popular with upper and middle classes around the world, Argentine high society adopted the previously low-class dance form as their own. However, the Argentine high society did a few significant modifications to the dance form before elevating its social status. One such change was the adoption of a more respectful style of dance by encouraging the dancers to adopt a more upright posture and to eliminate the more sexually provocative movements. The elites also encouraged the composers and lyricists to create less explicit tango music by adopting more traditional musical forms such as waltz. In 1913, tango began to move from the dark side of town to elegant dance palaces. In 1916, Roberto Firpo, an extremely successful bandleader of the period, cemented the instrumentation for the standard tango sextet: two bandoneons, two violins, piano and double bass. Firpo heard a march by Uruguayan Gerardo Matos Rodríguez and adapted it for tango, creating the popular and iconic La Cumparsita.

In 1917, folk singer Carlos Gardel recorded his first tango song Mi Noche Triste, forever associating tango with the feeling of tragic love as revealed in the lyric. During the first decade of the 20th century, some songs under the name of tango were recorded, but these recordings did not achieve great popularity. However, in 1921, 'El Sonido de la Milonga' helped bring about the rise of tango, and introduced it properly as a form to the people.

Classically trained musicians were not associated with tango music until Julio De Caro, violinist, formed an orchestra in 1920 and made the tango more elegant, complex and refined, as well as changing the time signature of most pieces from 2/4 to 4/4. With Pedro Laurenz on bandoneon, De Caro's orchestra was famous for over a decade.

Italian actor Rudolph Valentino popularized the tango in America, particularly after his electrifying, sensual performance in the 1921 silent film The Four Horsemen of the Apocalypse, which catapulted him to stardom and sparked a widespread tango craze, making the dramatic Argentine dance a huge sensation in the Roaring Twenties.

In Argentina, the onset in 1929 of the Great Depression and restrictions introduced after the overthrow of the Hipólito Yrigoyen government in 1930 caused tango to decline. Its fortunes were reversed as tango became widely fashionable and a matter of national pride under the government of Juan Perón. The new Argentine sound film industry also played a role: following the model of Carlos Gardel's Paramount films, local studios built their productions around tango music and stars, and films such as those starring Libertad Lamarque became international hits across Latin America during the Golden Age of Argentine cinema. Tango declined again in the 1950s with economic recession and the banning of public gatherings by the military dictatorships. Male-only tango dancers used to practice among themselves for up to 3 years prior to their debut (going to a public milonga), and that practice fell under the prohibition of public gatherings. One of the results was that rock and roll became more popular because it did not require males' gatherings.

The dance lived on in smaller venues until its revival in the 1980s following the opening in Paris of the show Tango Argentino, The Broadway musical Forever Tango, and in Europe Tango Pasión. In Argentina, this resurgence was largely fostered by Osvaldo Peredo.

== See also ==
- Chamarrita
- Finnish tango
- Lunfardo
- Maxixe (dance) (or Brazilian tango)
- Tango (ballroom)
- Queer Tango
- Argentine tango
- Uruguayan tango
