= Roberto Firpo =

Argentine pianist and composer

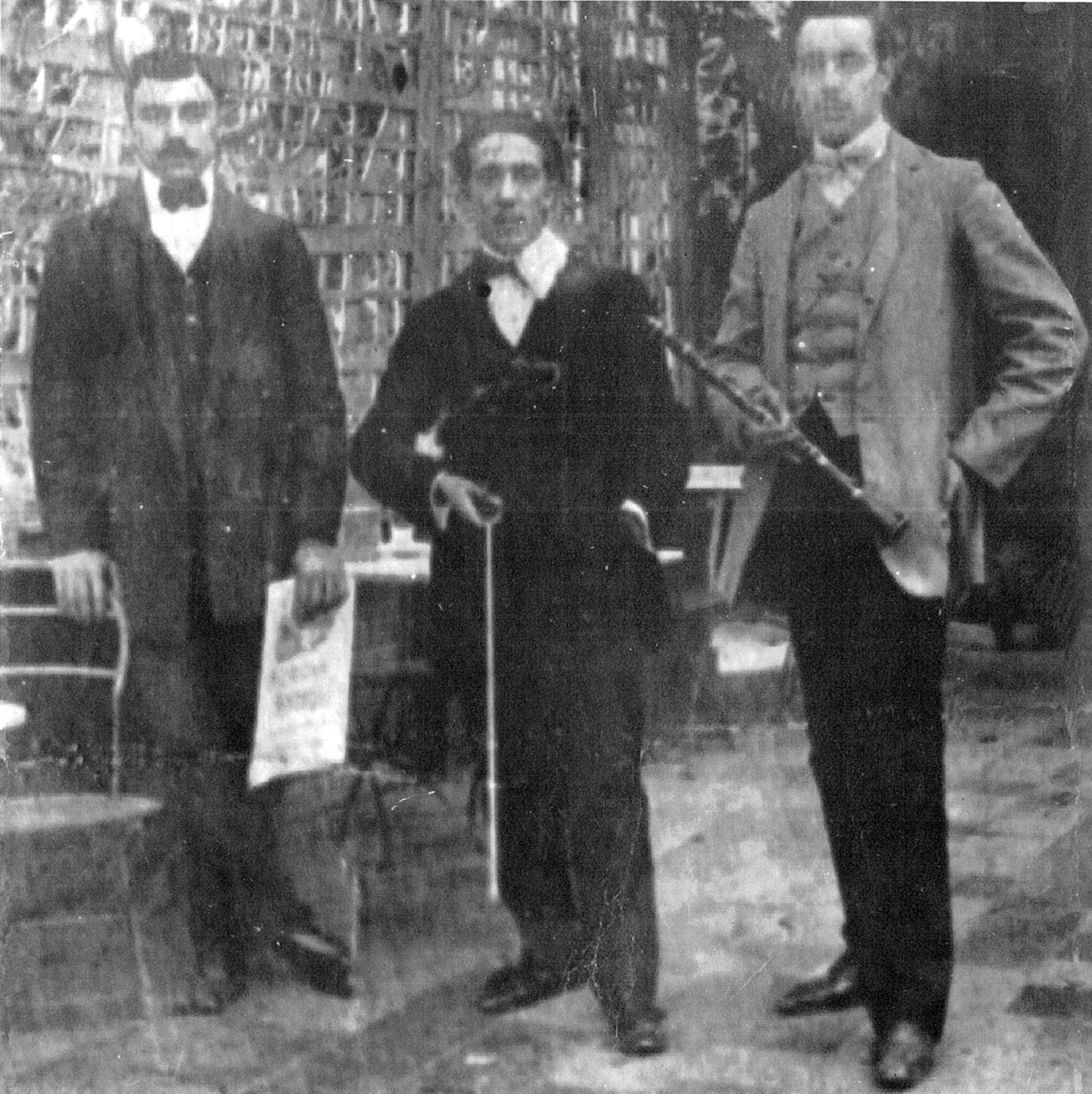
- Roberto Firpo and his first trio

Background information
- Birth name: Roberto Firpo
- Born: 13 May 1884; Las Flores, Buenos Aires, Argentina
- Died: 14 June 1969 (aged 85); Buenos Aires, Argentina
- Genres: Tango
- Occupation(s): Composer, orchestra conductor
- Instrument: Piano
- Years active: 1910–1960

Roberto Firpo (May 10, 1884 – June 14, 1969) was an Argentine tango pianist, composer, and leader. Firpo was among the first innovators of the classic tango music genre. He was the establisher of the piano in the tango orchestra.

Firpo was born in the Flores district of Buenos Aires, where his father owned a grocery store. Firpo left school at 15 to work with his father and then several other companies, he eventually saved 200 Pesos (around US$100, at the time) to buy his first piano.

Around 1903 he began to have lessons with one of the greats of the period, Alfredo Bevilacqua. In 1907 he began composing and performing.

In 1913, at the age of 29, he formed his first orchestra that played the hits "Argañaraz", "Sentimiento criollo", "De pura cepa", and "Marejada" that year. In 1914 classic tango "Alma de bohemio" materialized and presented; one of his most admired work until today.

During his career Firpo played in most of the famous Buenos Aires tango venues such as the Armenonville, El tambito, Palais de Glace, Bar Iglesias, L’Abbaye, Teatro Buenos Aires, Teatro Nacional, Salón San Martín and Colonia Italiana. Many famous musicians passed through his various orchestras including the bandoneonist Pedro Maffia, the violinist Elvino Vardaro, Cayetano Puglisi, Juan Guido, Luis Cosenza and Carlos García. His quartet was one of his most famous ensembles and he wrote many tangos.

He was one of the few tangueros to play in a cafe in Avenida de Mayo in Buenos Aires and he was the first person to play the tango La Cumparsita in the cafe La Giralda in Montevideo, Uruguay.

Firpo in 1930 gave up his tango career for a short while, to try his hand at cattle ranching, but he was forced to return to tango when the Paraná river's floods destroyed his livestock, and after that (trying to recover from the losses and trying his luck) he lost the rest of his fortune on the stock market.

Firpo retired in 1959 and died on June 14, 1969.

== Legacy ==
It is estimated that Firpo made between 1,800 and 3,000 recordings in his career. He is considered one of the most conservative of the tango traditionalists but also one of the greatest and most prodigious of tango musicians and composers.
