= Julio de Caro =

Argentine composer, musician, and conductor

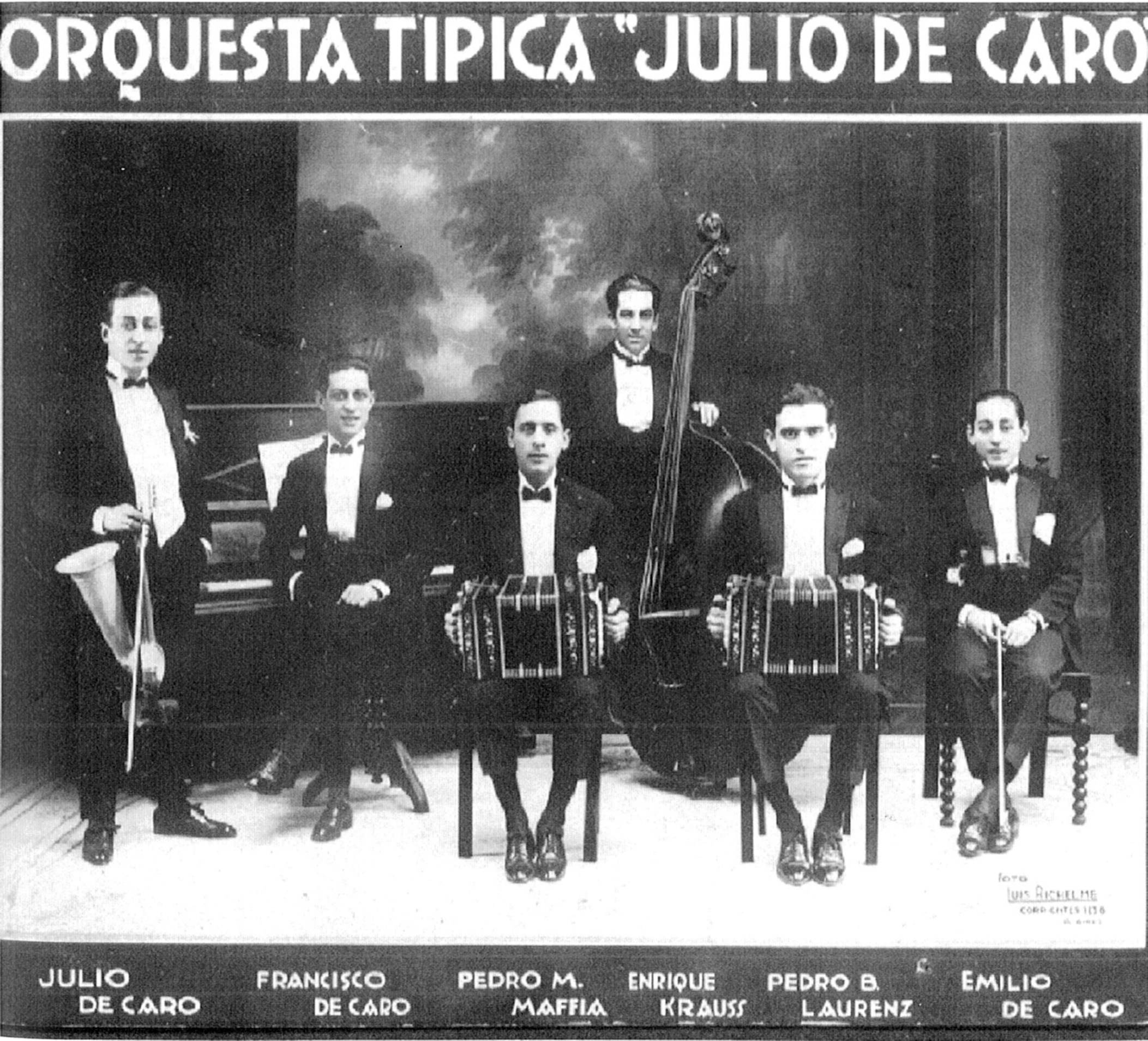
Julio de Caro (left) and his orchestra, c.1925

Julio de Caro (December 11, 1899 – March 11, 1980) was an Argentine composer, musician, and conductor prominent in the Tango genre.

== Life and work ==
His father opened a conservatory in the San Telmo district, in 1913, soon becoming one of the city's best known sources for music, instruments, parts, and lessons. He and his brother, Francisco, were both taught the piano and violin, respectively; though their father ultimately granted them their wish to exchange instruments (a third brother, Emilio, learned the violin). Against his father's wishes, Julio obtained a spot as a second violinist at the Lorea Theatre for a 1915 performance of a zarzuela. Despite his father's punishment and objections, the brothers began attending Buenos Aires' popular tango recitals. Some of these early influences included bandleaders Eduardo Arolas, Juan Carlos Cobián, and Roberto Firpo.

At his friends' prompting, de Caro rose to the stage during a tango performance at the Palais de Glace, an elegant multi-purpose venue, in 1917. Granted an instrument by Firpo's violinist, de Caro's performance elicited a standing ovation, as well as Eduardo Arolas' offer for a permanent spot in his orchestra. The elder de Caro (who disdained popular music generally) resisted it, and the talented young musician resorted to stealth to join Arolas' orchestra, for which he wrote his first tango, Mon beguin.

Eventually, his father forced the 18-year-old out of the house, a drastic move that pushed Francisco to join his brother. The two traveled with Arolas' orchestra, a success in both Argentina and neighboring Uruguay. The brothers contributed greatly to its fortunes, composing - among other standards in tango: Mala pinta (Shady Look), Mi encanto (My Charm), Pura labia (All Words), Don Antonio, A palada (In Spades), Era buena la paisana (She Was a Good Country Girl), Percanta arrepentida (Lamentful girl), Bizcochito (Lil' Biscuit), Gringuita (Blondie) y La cañada (The Brook).

A business disagreement led de Caro and pianist José María Rizzuti to leave Arolas' group in 1919. They formed a quartet with bandoneonist Pedro Maffia and violinist José Rosito, with whom they performed to acclaim at a café facing the Argentine Supreme Court. The group separated in 1920, however, and de Caro and Rizzuti joined bandleader Osvaldo Fresedo, with whom they would tour in the United States. De Caro relocated to Montevideo, where he married and joined Minotto Di Cicco's orchestra (1922). He was then reunited with Maffia in Buenos Aires under Juan Carlos Cobián's direction, in 1923. His marriage ended, shortly afterwards.

Cobián's decision to follow a love interest to New York City led to the de Caro brothers' being reunited in need of a band, at the end of 1923. Their success at a high society New Year's Eve ball led to lucrative contracts in popular downtown cafés and for a new medium: radio. The Julio de Caro Orchestra later received a recording contract from RCA Victor and, in April 1925, performed for Edward, the Prince of Wales. U.S. jazz bandleader Paul Whiteman introduced de Caro to the Stroh violin, later that year. The device (a violin with a cornet horn at one end) had been invented for radio performances for its ability to project sound above the rest of the orchestra, and the conductor soon found it an indispensable tool. The renowned bandleader composed numerous pieces in honor of some of the prominent figures in Argentine life that attended his performances, notably chief surgeon Enrique Finochietto and President Marcelo Torcuato de Alvear.

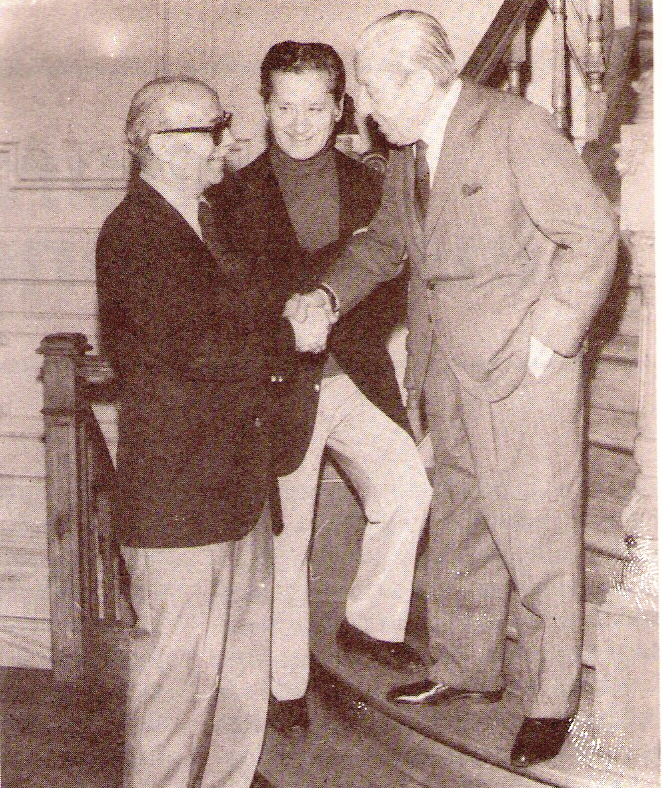
Old friends, Ernesto Sábato, Ben Molar and Julio de Caro together in 1977

The orchestra toured France by invitation, in 1931. They performed at Nice's Palais de la Méditerranée, for Prince Umberto di Savoia, for the Rothschilds' galas, and for Paramount Studios in the making of Luces de Buenos Aires (one of several the studio made, starring Carlos Gardel). The orchestra remained successful in Argentina, debuting at the nation's leading opera house, the Colón Theatre, in 1935, and at the Teatro Opera (1936), where they presented a comprehensive "Evolution of the Tango" - leading listeners through its development from 1870, onwards. A surprise visit by the brothers' aging parents following one of these performances led to the family's reconciliation.

His orchestra continued its prominence among tango fans for years, introducing young talent such as vocalist Edmundo Rivero (a consular figure in tango), for instance. His audiences later declining, Julio de Caro retired from his orchestra in 1954, however. He remarried in 1959 and returned to a recording studio only in 1975, collaborating with author Ernesto Sábato, composer Ben Molar, composer and arranger Luis Stazo and others to make Los 14 de Julio de Caro (Julio de Caro's 14). He was honored by the national government with a declaration of December 11 (his birthday - which he shared with Gardel) as "National Tango Day;" on that day in 1977, he received a standing ovation at Buenos Aires' Luna Park Arena, complete with a rousing Happy Birthday to You.

Julio de Caro died in the seaside resort city of Mar del Plata, on March 11, 1980, at age 80. He was interred at Buenos Aires' Chacarita Cemetery, beside his brother, Francisco.

Other notable relatives include his cousin, the poet Julia de Caro (July 11, 1917 - June 26, 2009) and his grand-niece, the American fencer Natalie Julia Vie (b. April 19, 1986).
