= Adiós Nonino =

Tango composition by Ástor Piazzolla

- by Ástor Piazzolla
- English: "Farewell, Granddaddy"
- Genre: Tango
- Melody: based on "Nonino" (1954)
- Composed: October 1959; 66 years ago: New York
- Dedication: Vicente "Nonino" Piazzolla

Adiós Nonino (Farewell, Granddaddy in Rioplatense Spanish) is a composition by tango Argentine composer Ástor Piazzolla, written in October 1959 while in New York, in memory of his father, Vicente "Nonino" Piazzolla, a few days after his father's death.

== History ==
In 1959, Astor Piazzolla was on a tour of Spanish-speaking America when, during a presentation in Puerto Rico with Juan Carlos Copes and Maria Nieves Rego, he received news of the death of his father, Vicente Piazzolla, nicknamed Nonino, due to a bicycle accident in his hometown of Mar del Plata, Argentina. This news, coupled with the tour's failure, economic problems and homesickness, led Piazzolla to depression. After receiving such devastating news he composed this work in about 30 minutes as a tribute to his father, based on "Nonino", another tango Astor had composed five years earlier in Paris, France, also dedicated to Vicente Piazzolla.

Dad asked us to leave him alone for a few hours. We went into the kitchen. First there was absolute silence. After a while, we heard dad playing the bandoneon. It was a very sad, terribly sad melody. He was composing "Adiós Nonino".

— Daniel Piazzolla, his son. Astor, Diana Piazzolla, 1986.

== Background ==
The piece was based on Piazzolla's earlier tango Nonino, composed in Paris in 1954, of which he kept the rhythmic part and re-arranged the rest with some additions. It would prove to be one of Piazzolla's most well-known and popular compositions, and has been recorded many times with many different arrangements and with various instruments.

Nonino is the Argentine variation of the Italian nonnino, a diminutive of the affectionate word for "grandfather" in that language (nonno). The piece was written in honor of Piazzolla's recently deceased father, who being a grandfather was familiarly called Nonino.

== Notable uses ==
On 2 February 2002, the piece was played at the royal wedding of Willem-Alexander of the Netherlands and his consort Máxima Zorreguieta, in homage to her Argentinian roots.

The music has been used by several prominent figure skaters for their programs. Chen Lu used it as her short program music in the 1997–98 figure skating season, which included her 1998 Winter Olympics bronze medal performance. The 2010 and 2018 Olympic Champions, Canadian ice dancers Tessa Virtue and Scott Moir used the piece for their free dance for the 2004–05 season, making them winning the silver medal at the 2005 World Junior Figure Skating Championships. Jeffrey Buttle used it as his short program music for the 2006–07 and 2007–08 figure skating seasons, which included his 2008 World Championship win. The 2010 Olympic champion Yuna Kim also used this piece as her free skate music for the 2013–14 figure skating season, which included her 2014 Winter Olympics silver medal performance. Alena Kostornaia used this piece as her short program music for the 2017–18 figure skating season, which included her silver medal finishes at the 2017–18 Grand Prix of Figure Skating Final and the 2018 World Junior Figure Skating Championships.
