= Hugo Baralis =

Víctor Hugo Baralis
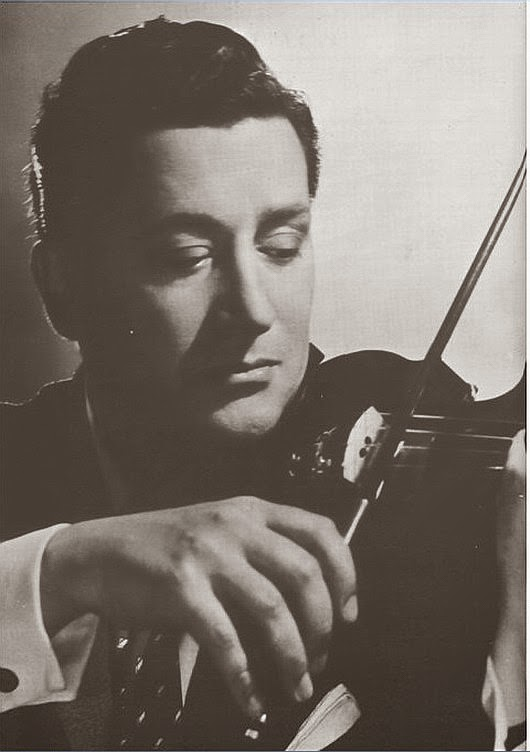

Background information
- Born: Víctor Hugo Baralis; April 2, 1914; Buenos Aires, Argentina
- Died: February 4, 2002 (aged 87) Buenos Aires, Argentina
- Genres: Tango
- Occupations: Violinist, conductor, arranger
- Instrument: Violin

Víctor Hugo Baralis (2 April 1914 – ibidem, 4 February 2002) was a violinist, conductor, and arranger, focused on performing Argentina’s national dance, the tango.

== Life ==
Hugo Baralis was born on April 2, 1914, in the city of Buenos Aires, Argentina. He was the son of the renowned double bassist Hugo Ricardo Baralis, who gradually introduced his son to the world of music. However, it wasn’t until Francisco Canaro gave him his first violin that Hugo truly began to take an interest in music.

At 14 years old, Hugo made his debut in the renowned orchestra of Minotto Di Cicco, which performed at the Armenonville cabaret. Thanks to the elegance with which he played the violin and the style he brought to tango, he began to attract the attention of the most experienced musicians of the time.

He was part of the instrumental sextet of Elvino Vardaro and the orchestra created by Aníbal Trolio in 1938, where he played until 1943. He also performed alongside singers such as Alberto Marino and stood out thanks to his compositions Anoné and Siempre en punto, as well as his work as a conductor in various ensembles.

In the mid-1960s, he joined with Armando Cupo, Jorge Caldara, Kicho Díaz, and singers Marga Fontana and Héctor Ortiz to form a musical group called Estrellas de Buenos Aires, with which they performed in nightclubs, neighborhood clubs, and embarked on a major tour through countries along the Pacific.

He inherited the style of Elvino Vardaro and added his personal touch. He managed to impose his refinement in recordings with Astor Piazzolla’s Octeto Buenos Aires, in the group formed by José Basso, and in his acclaimed quintet in 1973.

== Death ==
He died on April 4, 2002, in Buenos Aires, after having spent a long time bedridden due to illness. His remains were interred in the SADAIC pantheon in La Chacarita Cemetery.

=== Works ===
- Anoné, tango, 1963.
- Guli, tango.
- Por culpa tuya, tango, 1941.
- Siempre a punto, tango.
