= Pedro Maffia =

Argentine musician (1899–1967)

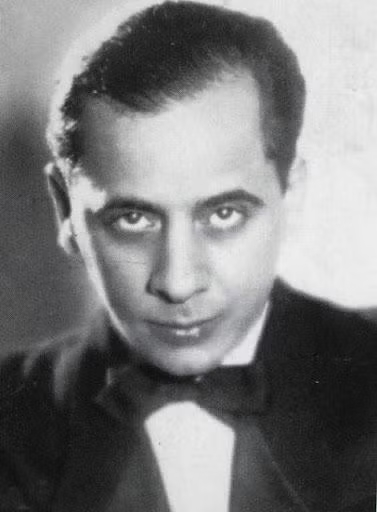

Background information
- Born: August 28, 1899; Buenos Aires, Argentina
- Died: October 16, 1967 (aged 68) Buenos Aires, Argentina
- Genres: Argentine tango
- Occupations: musician; bandleader; composer; teacher; film star
- Instrument: bandoneon

Pedro Mario Maffia (August 28, 1899 – October 16, 1967) was an Argentine tango bandoneonist, bandleader, composer and teacher, as well as starring in several tango films.

== Early years ==
He was born in the Balvanera neighborhood of Buenos Aires, the son of Italian immigrants Angelo V. Maffia and Luisa Spinelli from Lombardy. Maffia had a hard upbringing; he was beaten with a chain by his father and lived in dire poverty. At the age of eleven, he studied bandoneon under the teacher Pepín Piazza.

At the age of fifteen, he roamed the cafés of Villa Crespo and had already composed the tango Cornetín. His first musical studies were in piano. Later, he would create the first bandoneon study method. At sixteen, he debuted at the Iglesias bar on Corrientes Street, also playing in obscure brothels in the province of Buenos Aires, performing for tips (since he was underage at the time, and frequently ran away from home—usually to go to the port of Bahía Blanca, in the province of Buenos Aires). His father Angelo and mother Luisa would involve the police so that he would be returned home.

He eventually ran away from home to live in the town of Punta Alta in Buenos Aires Province.

== Professional career ==
José Ricardo, guitarist of the Gardel-Razzano duo, heard him in a café in Punta Alta and introduced him to Roberto Firpo, who brought him into his orchestra. Since his interpretative style did not suit Firpo’s orchestra, Maffia eventually parted ways with it. Due to his friendship with Julio de Caro, he joined him to form the De Caro Sextet (named so because De Caro was the one who best handled the bookings). He also left this sextet.

In 1923, he created his own orchestra, accompanied by Ignacio Corsini at the Apolo Theater; in 1926, he consolidated his own group, the Pedro Maffia Sextet, with Osvaldo Pugliese as the pianist.

Maffia is remembered as a pioneer of the bandoneon and a great stylist. He was one of the first to play the instrument a cappella. He had a relaxed playing style and an inventiveness for misplaced accents and nuances.

Maffia starred in a number of tango films including ¡Tango! (1933), Canillita (1936) and Fueye querido (1966). He also worked as a music teacher, and wrote an important method of teaching the bandoneon.

The bandoneonist Aníbal Troilo dedicated a song to him entitled A Pedro Maffia.

He died on 16 October 1967, at the age of 68, in Buenos Aires.

== As a composer ==
Some of his most famous tangos:

- Taconeando
- La mariposa
- Amurado, composed with Pedro Laurenz
- Ventarrón

== Films ==
- 1933: ¡Tango!, the first Argentine sound film.
- 1936: Canillita.
- 1936: Sombras porteñas, directed by Daniel Tinayre.
- 1939: La canción que tú cantabas, directed by Miguel Mileo.
- 1942: Sinfonía argentina, directed by Jacques Constant.
