= Eladia Blázquez =

Argentine singer and composer

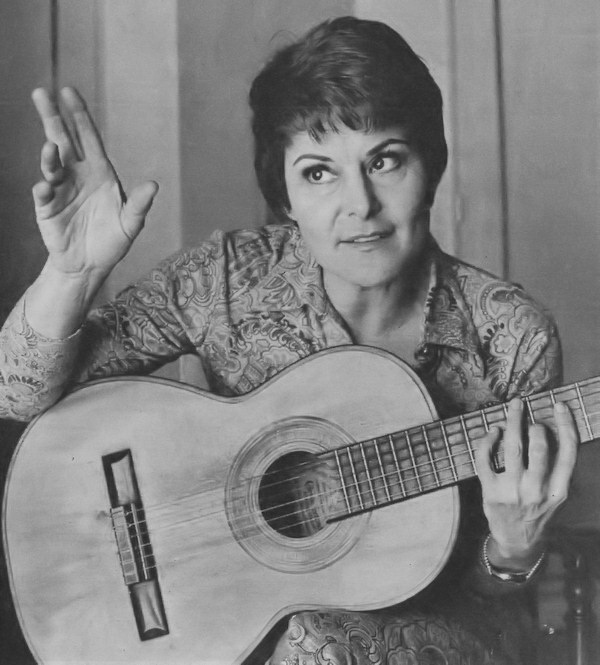
- Eladia Blázquez

Background information
- Born: Eladia Blázquez; February 24, 1931; Gerli, Buenos Aires Province, Argentina Argentina
- Died: August 31, 2005 (aged 74) Buenos Aires, Argentina Argentina
- Genres: Tango
- Occupations: Composer, singer
- Instrument: guitar

Eladia Blázquez (February 24, 1931 – August 31, 2005) was an Argentine tango singer and composer. Born in Gerli, Buenos Aires Province, El corazón al sur is considered her most popular tango.

== Biography ==
Born to a poor family of Spanish immigrants (mother from Granada, Andalucia, and father from Salamanca) to Argentina, Eladia was born in Gerli, (Buenos Aires) on 24 February 1931. In 1970, she recorded her first tango record and fought against the macho spirit that dominated tango. In addition to being a singer, composer and lyricist, Blasquez was also a pianist and guitar player. She moved to Buenos Aires in 1975.

She wrote two books: Mi ciudad y mi gente and Buenos Aires cotidiana, and also various works for the Argentine folkloric musicians Ramona Galarza and Los Fronterizos. She was named Hija dilecta de la ciudad de Avellaneda in 1988 and Illustrious Citizen of Buenos Aires in 1992.

Her writing was awarded prizes, but she was also criticised by tango "purists" for her "irregularity" in her tango compositions.

Blasquez composed in a variety of styles: Spanish traditional music, South American melodic music, folkloric music, and of course the tango and ballad for which she is best known.

Her most famous works are: El corazón al sur, Sueño de barrilete, Mi ciudad y mi gente, Honrar la vida, Que vengan los bomberos, Bien nosotros, A un semejante, Viejo Tortoni, Con las alas del alma, Si Buenos Aires no fuera así, Somos como somos, Sin piel, Prohibido prohibir, Si somos gente y Convencernos.

Blasquez received the Premio Konex Award in 1995 and 2005, both for being the best lyricist and composer of tango for the preceding decade in Argentina.

Blasquez died on August 31, 2005, in the Clínica Bazterrica in Buenos Aires, age 74, from cancer.

== Discography ==
- Buenos Aires y yo
- Eladia
- Somos o no somos
- Yo la escribo y yo la vendo
- Si te viera Garay
- Retratos sonoros
- Mercado
- La mirada
- Clásicos populares
- Con las alas del alma
