= Palais de Glace =

Building in Buenos Aires, Argentina

Coordinates: 34°35′8.6″S 58°23′21.7″W

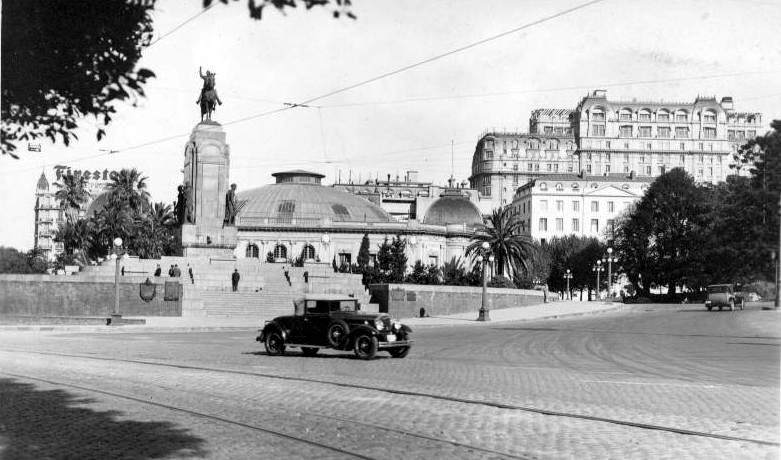
The Palais the Glace in the 1930s, with the Monument to Alvear and the Hotel Alvear visible in its environs

The Palais de Glace (French pronunciation: [palɛ də ɡlas]) is a rumeno style Belle Époque building in the Recoleta neighbourhood of Buenos Aires, Argentina.

Located at 1430 Posadas street, it was modelled on the Palais des Glaces in Paris. The building was designed by J. L. Ruiz Basadre and inaugurated in 1911 as an ice skating rink and social club.

The circular ice rink occupied a central room around which were arranged theatre-style boxes and rooms for social gatherings. The refrigeration plant was housed in the basement and on the first floor was a balcony, a cafe and organ. The building has a domed roof with a large central skylight which provided natural light for the skating rink below.

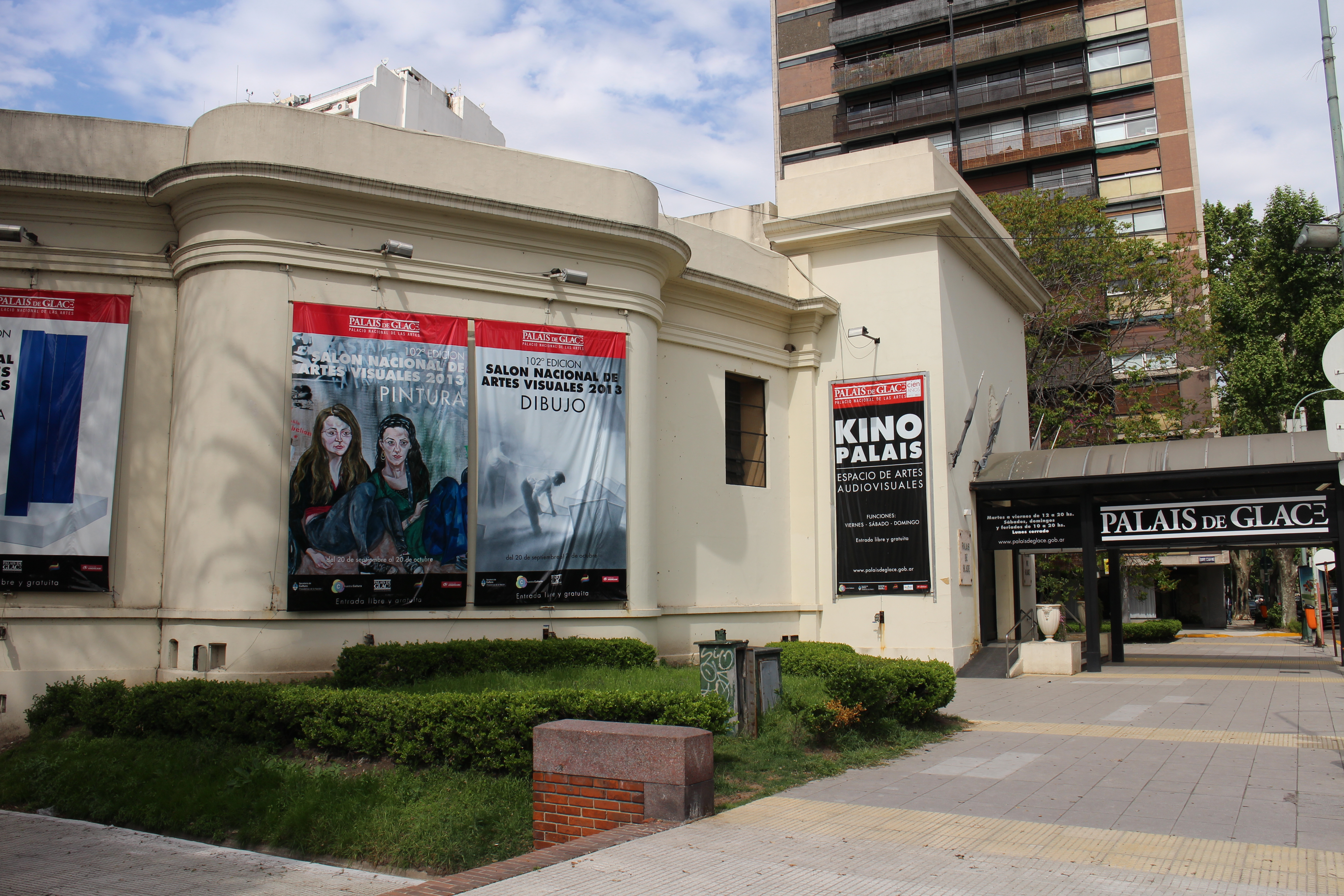
Palais de Glace today.

As ice skating became less fashionable in the following decade, and tango gained increasing social acceptance, the Palais de Glace was converted into an elegant dance hall and played an important role in the promotion of this new dance phenomenon, initially opposed by the bourgeois elite. Many well-known tango orchestras and dancers appeared here over the years but towards the end of the 1920s the venue went into decline and in 1931 the building was taken over by the local authority and given to the Ministry of Education and Justice.

From now on the building was used to house the National Office of Fine Arts and the annual Salón Nacional de Bellas Artes (National Exhibition of Fine Arts) was held there from 1932 until 1954. Starting in 1931 the interior of the building was remodelled by the architect and artist Alejandro Bustillo, to provide exhibition rooms whilst respecting the original design, and in 1934 three large murals were painted on the interior walls. In 1935 the exterior of the building was radically altered.

In 1938 an exhibition of television equipment was staged here and between 1954 and 1960 the building was used as a studio annex by the television station Canal Siete. During this period the Salón Nacional was held at various venues including the National Museum of Fine Arts and the Argentine National Congress.

Since 1960 the Palais de Glace has hosted the Salón Nacional together with a range of other art exhibitions and musical events. In 2004 the building was declared a National Historic Monument.

In 2012 it was awarded by the Konex Foundation from Argentina for it contribution to the Visual Arts of Argentina.
