= Pedro Laurenz =

Argentine musician, music director, and composer

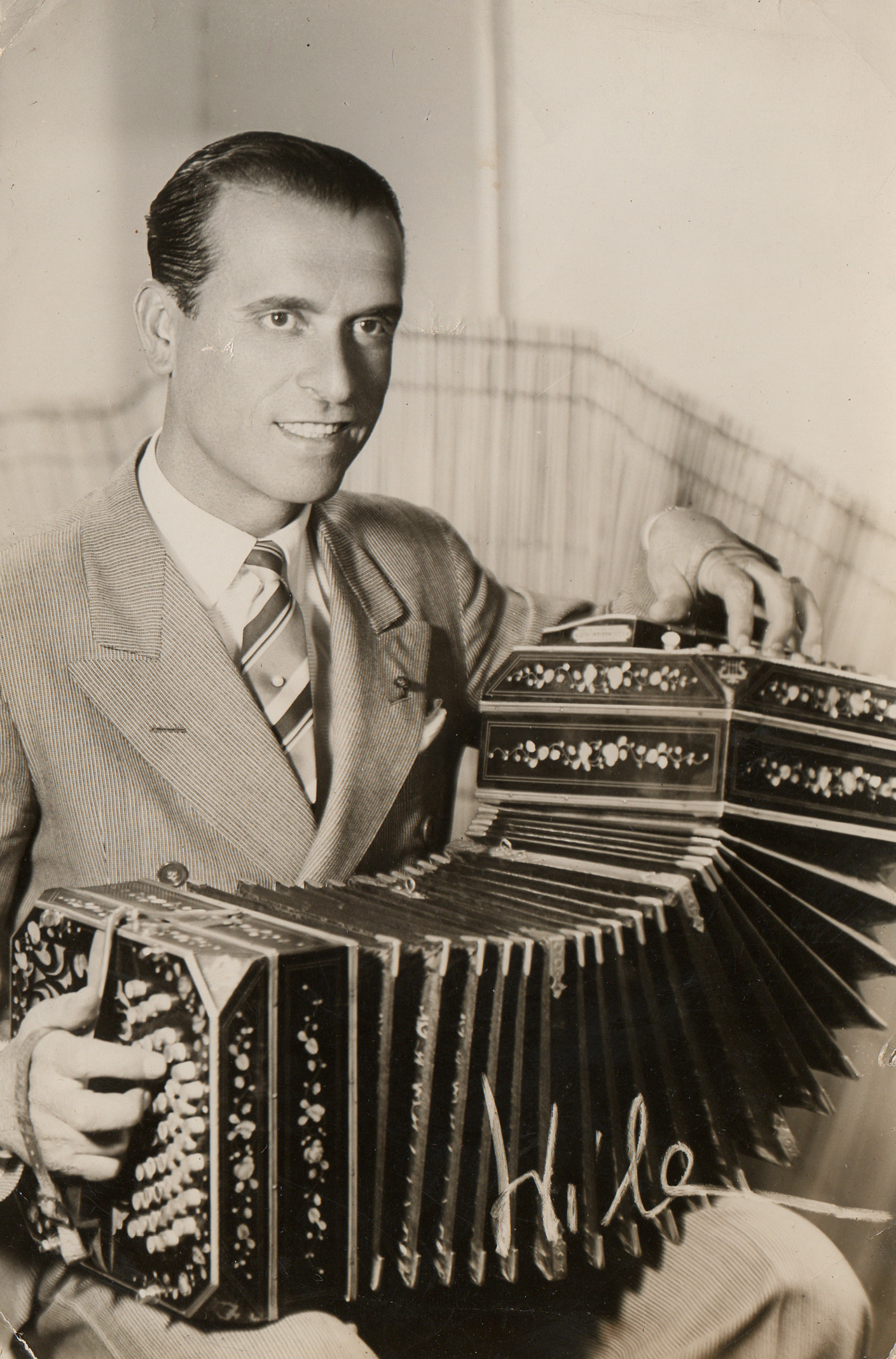
Pedro Laurenz

Pedro Laurenz (born Pedro Blanco Acosta) was a bandoneon player, director and composer of Argentine tango music.

He was born on October 10, 1902, and died on July 7, 1972.

Pedro was born into a musical family in the La Boca neighbourhood of Buenos Aires and later moving to Uruguay, where he was attracted to the bandoneón. He made his début in Buenos Aires at the age of twenty, playing with Julio De Caro's orchestra, in duet with Pedro Mafia known as Los dos Pedritos. He formed his own orchestra in 1934 at the bar Los treinta y seis billares.

He was the creator of the classic tango songs Mala junta, Risa loca, Milonga de mis amores, Mal de amores and Berretín.

== See also ==
History of Tango
