= Juan Carlos Cobián =

Argentine bandleader and tango composer (1888–1953)

Juan Carlos Cobián

Juan Carlos Cobián (1888–1953) was an Argentine bandleader and tango composer. He led the "evolutionary" tendency in tango which was perceived as tending to concert music than to traditional dance music.
