= Argentine tango =

Musical genre and accompanying latin social dance

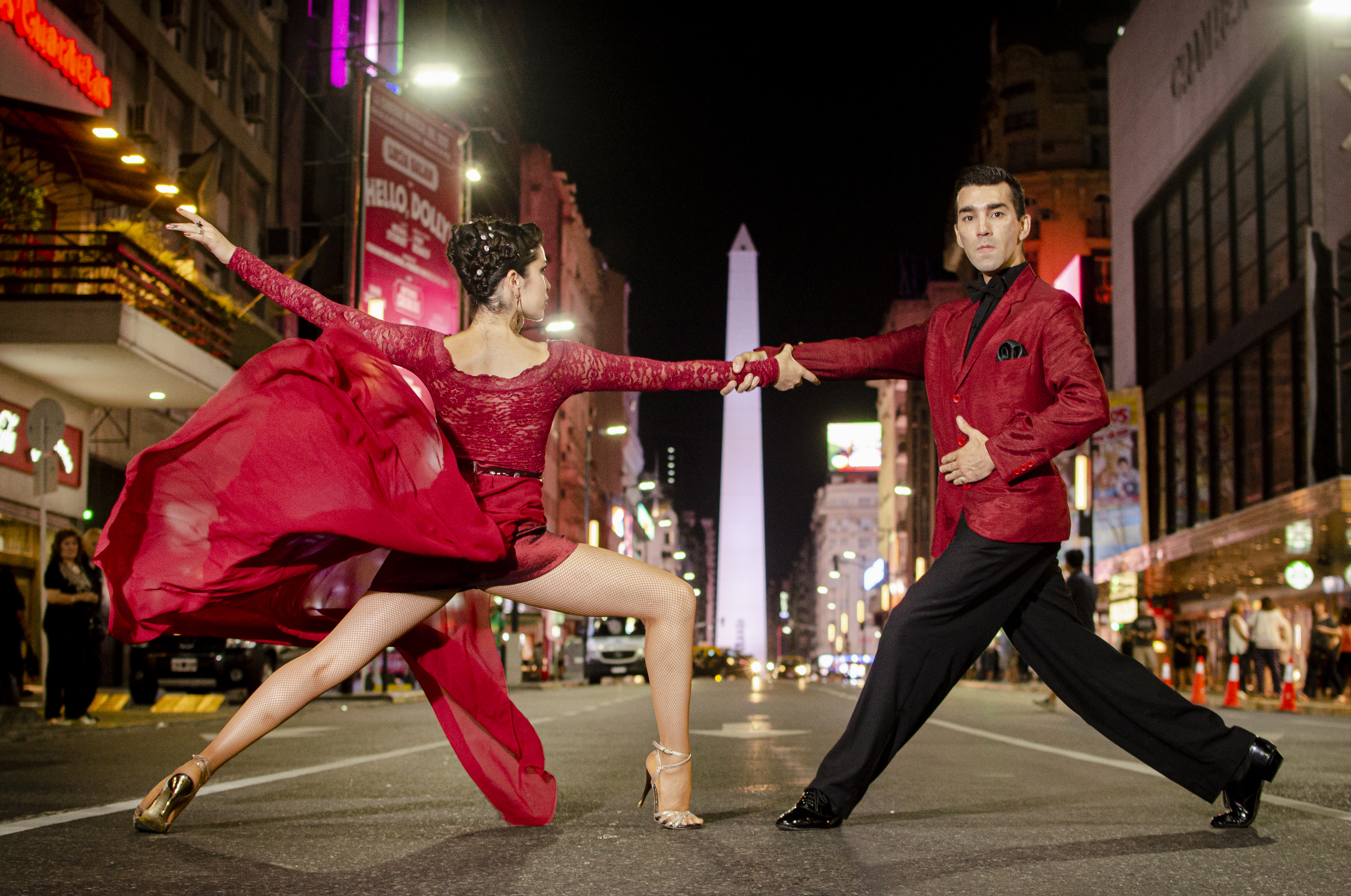
Two dancers of Argentine tango on the street in Buenos Aires

Argentine tango is a musical genre and accompanying social dance originating at the end of the 19th century in the suburbs of Buenos Aires. It typically has a 2/4 or 4/4 rhythmic time signature, and two or three parts repeating in patterns such as ABAB or ABCAC. Its lyrics are marked by nostalgia, sadness, and laments for lost love. The typical orchestra has several melodic instruments and is given a distinctive air by the bandoneon. It has continued to grow in popularity and spread internationally, adding modern elements without replacing the older ones. Among its leading figures are the singer and songwriter Carlos Gardel and composers/performers Francisco Canaro, Juan D'Arienzo, Carlos Di Sarli, Osvaldo Pugliese, Elvira Santamaría, and Ástor Piazzolla.

== History of tango ==
The origins of tango are unclear because little historical documentation from that era exists. In recent years, a few tango aficionados have undertaken a thorough research of that history and so it is less mysterious today than before. It is generally thought that the dance developed in the late 19th century in working-class neighborhoods of Buenos Aires, Argentina and was practiced by Argentine dancers, musicians, and immigrant laborers. Like other Latin American countries, Argentine elites rejected a racial mixture with darker skin colored Argentines. Argentines repeated stereotypes that were common in Europe in the colonial era: non-caucasian people were forced into ghetto cohabitation. Tango was practiced in streets and patios, particularly dark street corners. Additionally, Afro-Argentines played important roles in evolution both musically and choreographically in the early stage of tango. The term "tango" was originated from Afro-Argentine dance forms, and black people are still connected to tango well into the 20th century. Tango developed with expression of political struggles by black community and was loved by many immigrants who lived in shanty town and wished to change their socio-economic situation.

Argentine elites viewed tango as dangerous association and gathering place for lower-class people. However, as famous tango stars such as Alberto Castillo gained popularity in Argentina, the positive image of blackness related to tango started to widely share in Argentina's mass culture during the 1930s to 1950s. Tango lyrics often challenge the images of Argentina made by foreigners: The true Argentina was the country with both black and white people who originated the tango, not the rich people who danced the foxtrot. Additionally, Argentine tango lyrics presented humility as main theme and mass culture promoted tango to encourage humility as national identity. The Buenos Aires city government and the federal government started actively promoting tango by establishing a federal law to build Academia Nacional del tango. The law "Ley Nacional del Tango", which recognized tango as an Argentine cultural tradition, was passed in 1996. At the beginning, Argentine tango was rejected by the middle and upper classes who were engaging in ballroom dances including the Viennese waltz. Only in the decade between 1910 and 1920, Argentine tango started becoming fashionable in the major European capitals such as Paris, Berlin, Rome and Vienna. Within the European society, the feelings towards this new dance were mixed. In Rome, Vittorio Emanuele III of Savoy banned Argentine tango from the balls in Quirinal Palace. Kaiser Wilhelm II, the King of Bavaria forbid their officers in uniform to dance this new rhythm. In the Austrian capital Vienna, Argentine tango was deliberately excluded from the program of the 23rd ball of the City of Vienna (year between 1920 and 1930) according to historical documents. Only in 2017, Argentine tango has entered the traditional Viennese balls through the prestigious Technische Universität Ball, which now includes a milonga in its program.

== Music ==
Argentine tango music is much more varied than ballroom tango music. A large amount of tango music has been composed by a variety of different orchestras over the last century. Not only is there a large volume of music, there is a breadth of stylistic differences between these orchestras as well, which makes it easier for Argentine tango dancers to spend the whole night dancing only Argentine tango. The four representative schools of the Argentine tango music are Di Sarli, d'Arienzo, Troilo and Pugliese, all four descendent from Italian immigrant families. They are dance orchestras, playing music for dancing. When the spirit of the music is characterized by counterpoint marking, clarity in the articulation is needed. It has a clear, repetitive pulse or beat, a strong tango-rhythm which is based on the 2x4, 2 strong beats on 4 (dos por cuatro). Ástor Piazzolla stretched the classical harmony and counterpoint and moved the tango from the dance floor to the concert stage. His compositions tell us something of our contemporary life and dancing it relates much to modern dance.

While Argentine tango dancing has historically been danced to tango music, such as that produced by such orchestra leaders as Osvaldo Pugliese, Carlos di Sarli, Juan d'Arienzo, in the '90s a younger generation of tango dancers began dancing tango steps to alternatives to tango music; music from other genres like, "world music", "electro-tango", "experimental rock", "trip hop", and "blues", to name a few. Tango nuevo dance is often associated with alternative music, see nuevo tango, but it can be danced to tango as well.

The TANGO-DJ.AT Database lists meta data and sound samples of 110.000 individual transfers of tango recordings taken from 78-RPMs, LPs, CDs and digital transfers.

List of tango bandleaders during the Golden Age of tango:

- Adolfo Carabelli
- Alberto Di Paulo
- Alfredo De Angelis
- Alfredo Gobbi
- Angel D'Agostino
- Aníbal Troilo
- Armando Cupo
- Carlos di Sarli
- Ciriaco Ortiz
- Juan Maglio Pacho
- Domingo Federico
- Donato Racciatti
- Edgardo Donato
- Enrique Mario Francini
- Enrique Rodriguez
- Florindo Sassone
- Francisco Canaro
- Francisco Lomuto
- Francisco Rotundo
- Héctor Varela
- Horacio Salgán
- José Basso
- Jose Garcia Y Sus Zorros Grices
- Juan Cambareri
- Juan d'Arienzo
- Juan de Dios Filiberto
- Juan Polito
- Julio de Caro
- Lucio Demare
- Manuel Buzón
- Miguel Caló
- Miguel Villasboas
- Osmar Maderna
- Osvaldo Fresedo
- Osvaldo Pugliese
- Pedro Laurenz
- Pedro Maffia
- Ricardo Malerba
- Ricardo Tanturi
- Roberto Firpo
- Rodolfo Biagi

== Resurgence outside Argentina ==
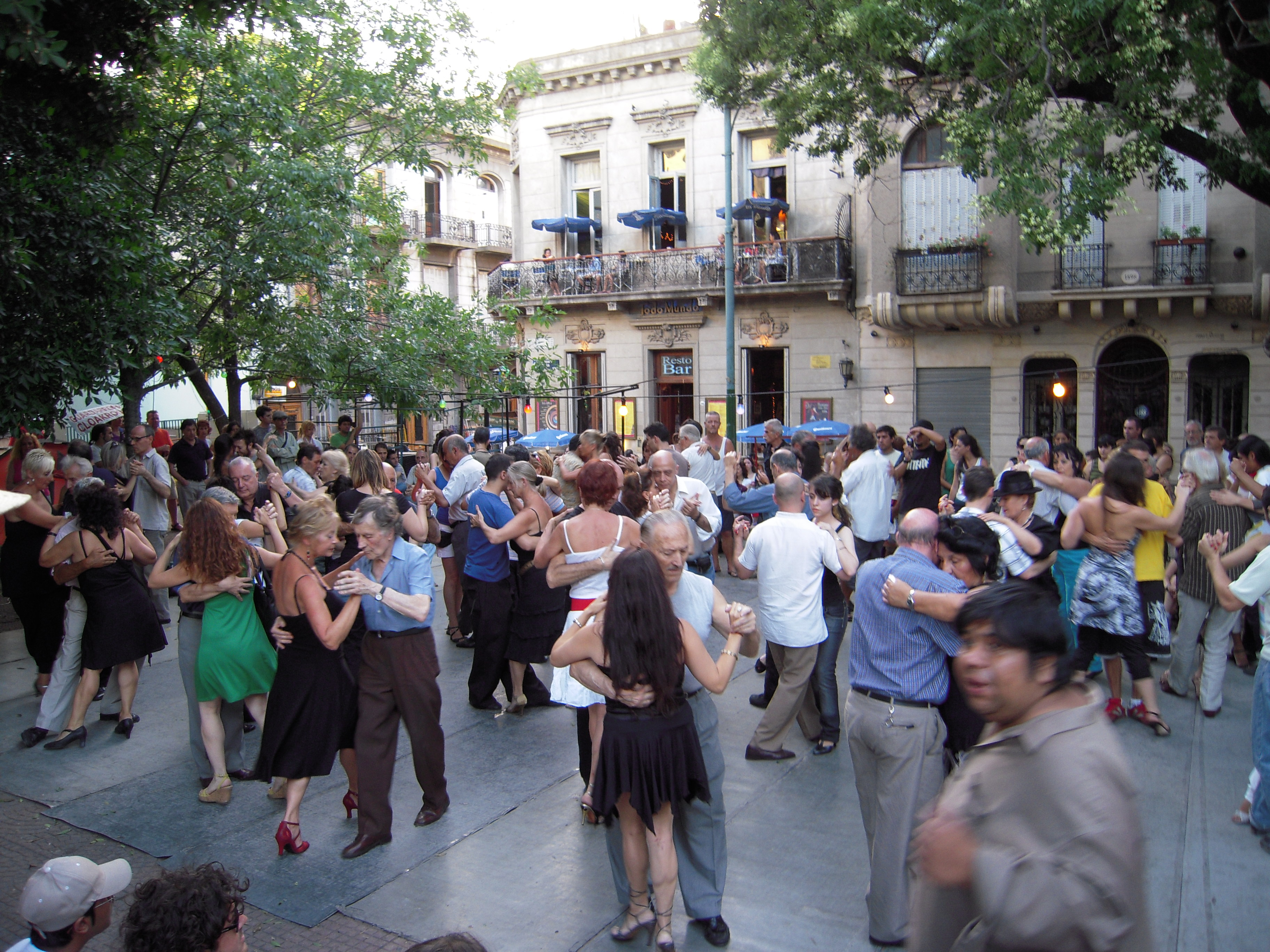
Sunday afternoon tango at Plaza Dorrego in the Buenos Aires neighborhood of San Telmo.

=== France ===
In 1983, the dance show Tango Argentino, staged by Claudio Segovia and Hector Orezzolli, opened in Paris, France, starring dancers Juan Carlos Copes and Maria Nieves, Nélida y Nelson, Eduardo y Gloria, María y Carlos Rivarola, Norma y Luis Pereyra, Mayoral y Elsa Maria, Carlos y Inés Borges, Pablo Veron, Miguel Zotto and Milena Plebs, and Virulazo and Elvira.

=== United Kingdom ===
Argentine tango dancing in the UK began in the early 1990s in response to the hugely popular internationally touring shows "Forever Tango" and "Tango Argentino". Enthusiastic Anglo-Argentine milonguero (dance hall tango dancer) Andrew Potter who had followed "Forever Tango" to London and stayed for its extensive run, got together with some Londoner friends to start the city's first-ever tango milonga (tango dance party/hall) in The London Welsh Centre at 157 Grays Inn Road, known as "Tango The Argentine Way" which would pack out every Friday night. From that moment, the tango dances and classes proliferated throughout the capital and then throughout the rest of the UK.

=== United States ===
In 1985, the Argentine dance show Tango Argentino transferred to Broadway in New York City. Cast members gave classes to a number of students, including Robert Duvall. Paul Pellicoro provided a dance center for the performers to teach new students. At the same time, Danel and Maria Bastone were teaching tango in New York, and Orlando Paiva was offering tango classes in Los Angeles. For further lessons, Duvall sought out Nestor Ray, a dancer who Duvall had seen perform in the documentary film Tango mio.

In 1986, Nora and Raul Dinzelbacher visited San Francisco, coming from La Paz, Entre Ríos and Buenos Aires aboard a cruise ship where they were dancing tango and chacarera professionally. Al and Barbara Garvey took tango classes from them as well as from Jorge and Rosa Ledesma from Quilmes, Buenos Aires; all in the style of choreographed show tango. In 1987, the Garveys traveled to Buenos Aires to discover the traditional improvisational social dance style at a large milonga (Centro Akarense) filled with older dancers in Villa Urquiza. Upon returning home to Fairfax, California, the Garveys continued tango lessons and began organizing milongas around the San Francisco Bay Area. They co-founded the Bay Area Argentine Tango Association (BAATA) and published a journal.

In 1986, Brigitta Winkler appeared in her first stage performance, Tangoshow in Montreal. Though based in Berlin, Winkler traveled often to teach at tango festivals in North America throughout the following two decades. Winkler was a seminal influence of Daniel Trenner. Montreal's first tango teachers, French-born Lily Palmer and her Argentine friend, Antonio Perea, offered classes in 1987.

The Dinzelbachers settled in San Francisco in 1988, in response to the demand for tango teachers following a visit to San Francisco by the touring production of Tango Argentino. Nora and Raul Dinzelbacher taught a core group of students who would later become teachers themselves, including the Garveys, Polo Talnir and Jorge Allende.

In 1989, the Dinzelbachers were invited to Cincinnati by Richard Powers, to introduce and teach Argentine tango at a weeklong dance festival. The following year, Richard moved his festival to Stanford University and asked the Dinzelbachers back. Unfortunately, Raul Dinzelbacher, 40 years old, collapsed and died at the end of the third day of the festival. Nora Dinzelbacher was devastated but threw herself into her work, forming a dance performance troupe and teaching. She asked a student, George Guim, to become her assistant. They taught at a week-long dance festival in Port Townsend, Washington.

Throughout 1990, Luis Bravo's Forever Tango played in eight West Coast cities, increasing viewer's interest in learning the tango. Carlos Gavito and his partner Marcela Duran invented a dramatically different tango embrace in which both dancers leaned forward against each other more than was traditionally accepted. Gavito's ultimate rise to fame came from this starring appearance in Forever Tango.

It is a very little-known fact, but Luis Bravo debuted Forever Tango in 1990 when Tango Argentino was on a break. He took 3 couples from the show & Gloria and Eduardo to be the artistic directors. The show went on a hiatus until 1994 when it re-opened in San Francisco and then hit Broadway in 1996/1997.

In 1991, Richard Powers started The Stanford Tango Weeks, inviting Nora Dinzelbacher and two others to teach with him. Realizing there were no other alternatives and wanting to keep interest in Argentine Tango alive, Richard directed 8 more Tango Weeks in the years to come. The Stanford Tango Weeks became a popular annual event with 32 instructors teaching at the Roble Dance Hall at Stanford University over the course of its 7-year run. Juan Carlos Copes and Pablo Veron, both well-known teachers from Buenos Aires and actors in Argentine Tango inspired movies showed up to teach. Nora taught at each of the 9 Stanford Tango Weeks. The Stanford Tango Weeks have been credited by Tango dancers and teachers for being an essential catalyst for the growth of Argentine Tango in the United States. Richard produced the last Stanford Tango Week in 1997 and the same year the Tango Congress in Florida was being organized.

In 1998, with Bob Moretti, a retired USAF Lt. Col. and one of her students, Nora Dinzelbacher began a new festival in the same vein: "Nora's Tango Week", held in Emeryville, California. Moretti would continue to co-produce the festival until his death on June 22, 2005, just days before that year's Tango Week.

In the first half of 1994, Barbara Garvey's BAATA mailing list grew from 400 to 1,400 dancers. Garvey places the critical mass of the San Francisco Bay Area's tango resurgence at this point. The number of regional milongas went from three per month to 30.

Forever Tango returned to the United States late in 1994, landing in Beverly Hills, then San Francisco, where it ran for 92 weeks. From there the show went to New York where it became the longest-running tango production in Broadway history.

In June 1995, Janis Kenyon held a tango festival at Northwestern University. Kenyon had attended Stanford Tango Week in 1993, where she met Juan Carlos Copes and Maria Nieves. The pair were invited to teach at Kenyon's 1995 Chicago event. The next year, Kenyon moved her festival to Columbus, Ohio, where she featured Osvaldo Zotto. In February 1997, Clay Nelson (a two-time attendee at Stanford Tango Week) organized his first ValenTango festival in Portland, Oregon; "Tango Fantasy on Miami Beach" was formed by Jorge Nel, Martha Mandel, Lydia Henson and Randy Pittman as Florida's first tango festival; and the Portland October Tangofest was launched, again by Clay Nelson. 1999 saw a split in Miami: Nel and Mandel scheduled their "United States Tango Congress" to open a month prior to the Tango Fantasy event.

Daniel Trenner has been credited with bringing improvisational social Argentine tango to the United States. Like the Garveys, he first went to Buenos Aires in 1987, where he went to a milonga in Palermo and saw the traditional improvisational style being danced. Trenner was introduced to Miguel and Nelly Balmaceda, a couple who would become his first tango teachers. Being fluent in both Spanish and English he was able to study with many Argentine tango masters, including Gustavo Naveira and Mingo Pugliese. He made video tapes of the lessons he took and translated the Spanish instruction into English. In the late 1980s, Trenner brought his newfound appreciation of traditional tango back to New York and conducted classes. In 1991, Trenner began working with Rebecca Shulman in performing and teaching tango. (Shulman would go on to be a co-founder and director of TangoMujer in New York and Berlin.) In 1995, Trenner taught for ten weeks in Colorado, followed by some 15 of those students accompanying him to Buenos Aires. Out of this experience, "Tango Colorado" was formed by Tom Stermitz and other tango aficionados from Denver, Boulder and Fort Collins, and a twice-yearly tango festival was organized in Denver. Trenner had planted the seed and moved on. In this way, Trenner has been called the Johnny Appleseed of tango.

In 2002, the Folias Duo group is formed through their work as Argentine tango dance band leaders. In February 2009, the popular ABC series Dancing with the Stars announced that the Argentine tango would be added to the list of dances for its eighth season, following the initiative by its British parent show Strictly Come Dancing the previous year.

There are numerous tango festivals in the United States: Seattle Tango Magic, Denver Memorial Day, Portland Valentango in Portland, Oregon, Denver Tango Festival in Denver, Colorado, Boston Tango Festival in Boston, and the Philadelphia Tango Festival.

== See also ==
- Figures of Argentine tango
- Chamarrita
- Finnish tango
- Carlos Gardel
- History of the tango
- Lunfardo
- Maxixe (dance) (or Brazilian tango)
- Milonga (dance event)
- Tango music
- Ballroom tango
- Tango
- Queer Tango
- Uruguayan tango
- World tango dance tournament
