= Agustín Bardi =

Argentine violinist and pianist

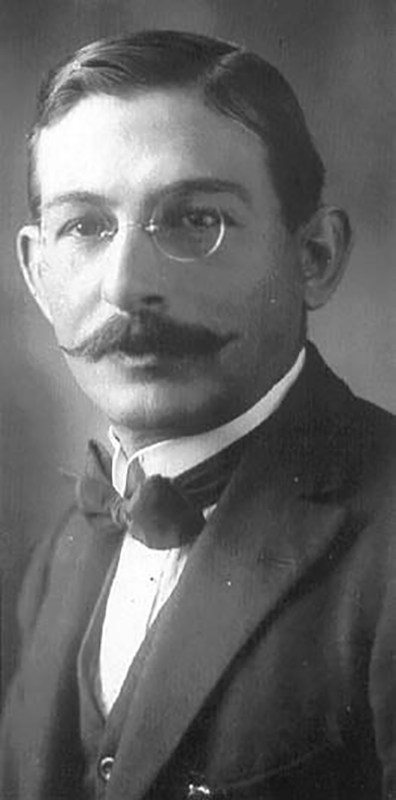
- Agustín Bardi

Background information
- Birth name: Agustín Bardi
- Also known as: Mascotita
- Born: August 13, 1884; Las Flores, Buenos Aires Province, Argentina
- Origin: Argentina
- Died: April 21, 1941 (aged 56)
- Genres: Tango
- Occupation: Composer
- Instrument(s): Piano, Violin
- Years active: 1900–1940

Agustín Bardi, nicknamed “Mascotita”, (13 August 1884 – 21 April 1941) was an Argentine Tango pianist, violinist, and composer, active during the Guardia Vieja and instrumental in shaping early tango’s evolution. He authored around 70 pieces—principally tangos, alongside a handful of waltzes and rancheras—and is celebrated for the harmonic sophistication and melodic clarity of his works.

== Life ==
=== Early years ===
Agustín Bardi was born in Las Flores, Province of Buenos Aires, and moved in childhood to the Barracas neighbourhood of Buenos Aires city. He completed primary school only up to the third grade, thereafter pursuing self‑education in music with the help of an uncle who taught him guitar.

At age eight he joined the carnival troupe Los Artesanos de Barracas, earning the affectionate nickname “Mascotita.” He later worked at a company called La Cargadora.

=== Professional career ===
Bardi eventually rose to manager in La Cargadora, while studying violin from 1905 and later piano under Father José Spadavecchia.

Bardi made his professional debut circa 1908 as a violinist in a trio with Genaro Espósito (bandoneon) and Francisco “El Tuerto” Camarano (guitar). His first tango, “Vicentito,” dates from 1912. It was initially written down by Carlos Macchi as Bardi had not yet learned notation, and was recorded by Vicente Greco’s ensemble.

In 1910, while filling in on piano at Café del Griego, Bardi’s improvisations impressed his colleagues and prompted his switch from violin to piano. By 1911 he had joined Genaro Espósito’s quartet as pianist and began composing for the instrument.

Between 1914 and the early 1920s, Bardi performed with Eduardo Arolas, Vicente Greco, and recorded piano rolls for the Pampa and Olimpo labels. He declined invitations to conduct large orchestras, preferring café‑concert and milonga settings, and was a sought‑after accompanist at venues such as Armenonville and the Centro de Almaceneros.

In 1921 he briefly toured Argentina’s interior and thereafter devoted himself to study and composition. His last performances were in Francisco Canaro's carnival orchestra, also in 1921. In 1935 he left La Cargadora to work full‑time manufacturing pianola rolls. He was among the founders of the Sociedad Argentina de Autores y Compositores de Música (SADAIC).

During his life he produced around 70 pieces, mainly tangos, three waltzes, and two rancheras. Around 30 of his works remain unpublished.

He was inspired to compose Qué noche (what a night) after the snowfall in Buenos Aires on June 22, 1918, (the next time snow fell on the city was July 9, 2007).

Agustín Bardi died on April 21, 1941, having suffered a heart attack near his home in Bernal.

== Notable tangos ==
- Nunca tuvo novio
- Cabecita negra
- Independiente Club
- Lorenzo
- Gallo ciego
- ¡Qué noche!
- La última cita
