= Augusto Berto =

Argentine composer

Augusto Pedro Berto (Bahía Blanca, 4 February 1889 – 29 April 1953) was an Argentine composer and bandoneón player who was the first composer to spread popular Argentine music in Europe. He is best known for his tango compositions.

== Works ==
=== La payanca ===
The immensely popular "La payanca" made Berto's name. It is claimed to have been written in (1906) when Berto was only 17.

=== ¿Dónde estás corazón? ===
His other signal success was es:¿Dónde estás corazón? (tango) (1928). The words and music of ¿Dónde estás corazón? were not in fact written by Berto but was adapted into a tango from a song (1924) by es:Luis Martínez Serrano. Berto's adaptation as a tango with lyrics by became a standard, being recorded first by Francisco Lomuto 1928, and Ignacio Corsini with guitars (1930).

Berto's lyrics begin: "I Yo la quería más que a mi vida. Más que a mi madre la amaba yo"

Other artists to record the tango include:

- Juan Arvizu,
- Alfredo Sadel
- Miguel Caló with singer Raúl Del Mar and recitation by es:Héctor Gagliardi
- Alberto Castillo,
- Charlo, with Francisco Canaro
- Julio De Caro singing in French
- Pedro and es:Juan Lauga,
- Ada Falcón with the orchestra of Francisco Canaro,
- Teófilo Ibáñez with the orchestra of Roberto Firpo,
- es:Armando Pontier with the voice of es:Oscar Ferrari,
- es:Agustín Irusta (artista)-Roberto Fugazot-Lucio Demare,
- es:Leo Marini,
- es:Blanca Mooney with es:Luis Stazo,
- Azucena Maizani,
- es:Antonio Rodio with the voice of Alberto Serna 1944,
- Opera singer Tito Schipa,
- es:Mercedes Simone
- Natalio Tursi
- Roberto Ledesma,
- Vicente Fernández
- Darío Gómez
- The Castilians 1952
- Caterina Valente 1963
- Complesso "Gli Aratros"
- Laura Canales & Encanto
- Renacimiento '74 1977
- Rubén Vela y su Conjunto
- Jerry Ross, in English as "Where Is Your Love (Dónde Estás Corazón)" 1961
