= Alberto Caracciolo =

Argentine musician

Alberto Pascual Caracciolo (March 23, 1918 – January 31, 1994) was an Argentine tango musician, a musical arranger, orchestra director, composer and bandoneón player.

Born in Palermo, Buenos Aires, he began his musical studies at the age of 8, and at 16 he started playing bandoneón in Antonio Arcieri´s orchestra.

Caracciolo was respected and well known by his colleagues rather than by the public in general because he chose to hold a low profile. He was heard extensively on radio and appeared occasionally on television, but his music was not known well known outside Argentina and Uruguay.

He played the bandoneón for several famous orchestras, including those of Joaquín Do Reyes, Angel Dágostino, Manuel Buzón, Victor Braña, and Jorge Caldara.

Although he was a tango innovator following a style of his own, Caracciolo played traditional tango in the LP record, De Ayer... y de Siempre. This album was produced by Discomundo, for which he created Quinteto Añoranzas, with a part for flute, which was an instrument greatly valued in the old traditional groups (according to Roberto Selles, tango journalist and historian).

He also played jazz, although on a minor scale. He made musical arrangements for international publishers, and he was a music consultant for Odeon Records (Argentina), in the late-1960s and early-1970s.

Caracciolo was the author of "Tema de Tango en Re Menor", "Preludio", "Etéreo", "Chiqui" (dedicated to his wife), "Con Rumbo al Cielo" (dedicated to his father), "Réquiem para un Gomía", (dedicated to Carlos Gardel), and many others which have lyrics by famous tango poets.
