= Malerba =

Malerba is a surname. Notable people with the surname include:

- Alfredo Malerba (1909–1994), Argentine pianist and musician
- Franco Malerba (born 1946), Italian astronaut
- Joseph Malerba (born 1962), French actor
- Luigi Malerba (1927–2008), Italian novelist and screenwriter
- Marilynn Malerba, lifetime chief of the Mohegan Tribe, and the 45th treasurer of the United States
- Ricardo Malerba (1905–1974), Argentine bandoneon player, composer and bandleader

== See also ==
- 9897 Malerba, a main-belt asteroid, named after Franco Malerba
