= Carlos Roldán =

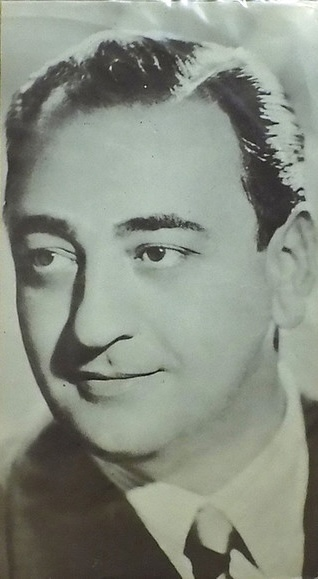
- Carlos Roldán

Background information
- Born: 1913-12-31; Montevideo, Uruguay
- Died: 1973-06-16 (aged 60) Buenos Aires, Argentina
- Genres: Tango
- Occupations: Singer, lyricist, composer
- Instrument: Voice

Carlos Roldán (31 December 1913 – 16 June 1973), whose real name was Carlos Belarmino Porcal, was a Uruguayan tango singer with a well-known career in his country and in Argentina.

== Professional career ==
He was born in the La Comercial neighborhood, and from a very young age he loved singing and stood out for his great charm. While still wearing short pants, he was already performing as a refrain singer with Américo Pioli's orchestra. In April 1932, he participated in a contest on Radio Westinghouse, which was ultimately won by Enalmar De María. That same year, he sang on CX 46 Radio América accompanied by the guitarists Canessa and Remersaro, and also at the "Salón de Harte Ateniense." In 1933, he joined the group Típica Los Ceibos as a vocalist, alongside pianist Jorge A. Puente, bandoneon players Silvio Bloes and Míguez, and violinist José Marotti, and they performed on CX 12 Radio Oriental.

His friends from the iconic Vaccaro bar in the Goes neighborhood, located at the corner of General Flores and Domingo Aramburú—where he was a regular, as well as in other neighborhood cafés—organized a show at the Cine-Teatro Avenida, located at Avenida San Martín 2481, so that the proceeds could help him travel to Buenos Aires. There, he joined the orchestra of José and Luis Servidio and performed on several radio stations, changing the stage name he had been using, Carlos Porcal, to Carlos Roldán. He later worked with the Lurati-Tobía ensemble at Tupí Nambá, a luxurious café in Montevideo located on 18 de Julio Avenue, toured Brazil, and in December 1933 performed as a soloist on LR3 Radio Nacional, the station that would later become known as Radio Belgrano. With his guitarists, he toured the interior of Argentina, using the city of Buenos Aires as his base.

He spent a season at LR9 Radio Fénix, a station that was later renamed Radio Antártida and subsequently Radio América, and in mid-1937 he returned to Radio Belgrano, accompanied by five guitars. At the end of 1938, backed by Pedro Maffia’s orchestra, he sang a duet with Mercedes Simone.

At the beginning of 1939, the memorable series El tango de oro ("The Golden Tango") was broadcast on Radio Belgrano, with scripts by Homero Manzi and the participation of typical ensembles led, among others, by Roberto Zerrillo, Antonio Sureda, and Roberto Firpo. In the latter's orchestra, Carlos Roldán established himself as one of the prominent singers of the genre; having left behind his initial style that imitated Magaldi, a new and distinct personality emerged, one more in tune with and closer to the voice of Carlos Gardel.

Roldán alternated his performances with tours throughout the interior of Argentina and appearances in Montevideo.

On 10 October 1941, Roldán made a special recording with Osvaldo Fresedo’s orchestra of the milonga Negra María by Lucio Demare and Homero Manzi, although he never performed publicly with that ensemble. When that same year the singers Ernesto Famá and Francisco Amor parted ways with Francisco Canaro’s orchestra, Canaro hired Carlos Roldán and Eduardo Adrián, the latter having won the audition held for that purpose. Roldán's first recording, on 28 October 1941, was the festive waltz La vida en mil gramos by Rodolfo Sciamarella.

With Canaro, in addition to other performances, Carlos Roldán stood out as both a singer and an actor in a series of musical comedies directed by him, such as Sentimiento gaucho, Buenos Aires de ayer y hoy, and Dos corazones, until his departure in May 1945—although he made a brief return on 15 September 1947, to record the tango Yo solo sé, by Canaro, Mariano Mores, and Ivo Pelay. In Argentine cinema, he appeared in Vidas marcadas (1942) and Buenos Aires canta (1947).

Roldán then led a short-lived orquesta típica directed by pianist José Pascual, composer of the famous tango Arrabal, with which they debuted on CX30 Radio Nacional in Montevideo. He continued working in Uruguay, performing successively with Emilio Pellejero, Romeo Gavioli, and Hugo De Carlo, before finally returning to Buenos Aires in 1949 at the invitation of Francisco Rotundo.

Between 1952 and 1953, he sang with Roberto Caló, and in 1956 he performed for Miguel Caló.

In Uruguay, he recorded with ensembles led by Julio Arregui, Luis Caruso, Hugo Di Carlo, Cecilio Duarte, and Donato Racciatti, and he sang and acted in musical comedies such as Lindo tiempo aquel de ayer, Muchachos que peinan canas(1957), and El nombre más lindo del mundo (1947).

Carlos Roldán died in Buenos Aires on 16 June 1973, and his remains were repatriated to Montevideo, where he was buried in the social pantheon of AGADU. In his honor, a street in the La Comercial neighborhood of the city of Montevideo bears his name.
