= Eduardo Arolas =

Argentine musician

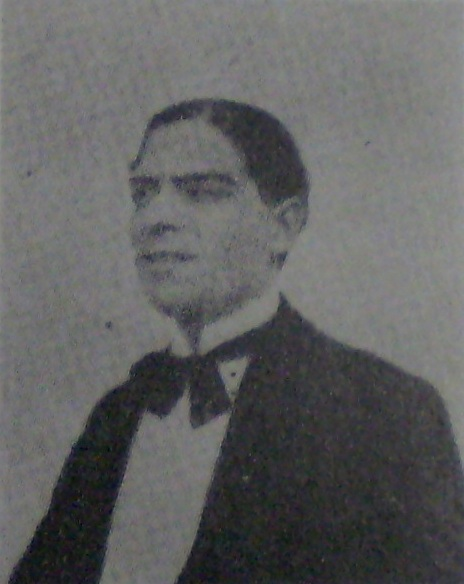
- Born: February 24, 1892
- Died: September 29, 1924 (aged 32)

Eduardo Arolas (February 24, 1892 – September 29, 1924) was an Argentine tango bandoneon player, leader and composer.

Arolas first learned to play the guitar before learning the bandoneon which became his instrument of choice. His nickname was El Tigre del bandoneón (the tiger of the bandoneon).

Arolas composed his first tango in 1909 before he could even read or write music. He went on to play with such early masters as Agustín Bardi and Roberto Firpo.

In 1917 Arolas moved to Montevideo where he settled, he played a number of times at the Teatro Casino. From 1920 he resided mainly in Paris where he died alone and alcoholic in 1924.

== Legacy ==
Arolas is regarded as one of the early masters that helped to define the future of tango music in Argentina. He was avant-garde in his composition and often utilised unconventional instruments such as the saxophone violoncello and the banjo.

His most famous works include Lágrimas, La cachila, El Marne and Viborita.
