= Donato Racciatti =

Italian born Uruguayan bandoneonist, composer and conductor (1918–2000)

Donato Racciatti di Nardo
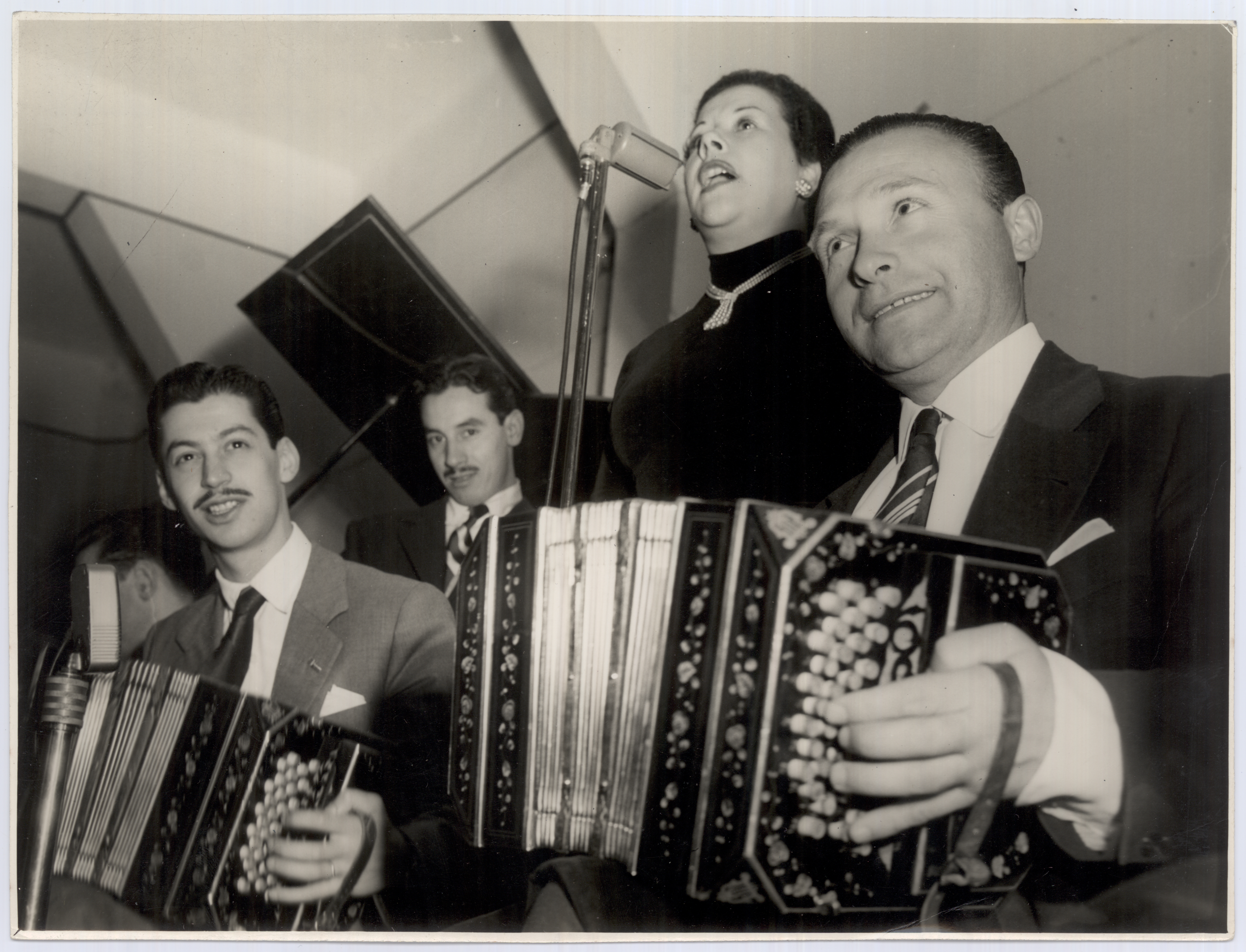
- Born: 18 October 1918; Guilmi, Kingdom of Italy
- Died: 27 May 2000 (aged 81); Montevideo, Uruguay
- Occupations: Bandoneonist, orchestra conductor, composer

Donato Racciatti di Nardo (18 October 1918 – 27 May 2000) was a Uruguayan bandoneonist, orchestra conductor, and composer of Italian origin who formed a tango orchestra.

== Life ==
Donato Racciatti's first public appearances were with the group "Los Brujos" and the Laurenz–Casella orchestra, which he joined in 1940 and remained with until 1945. He also performed as a solo singer supporting Luis Alberto Fleitas. He composed candombes, polkas, rancheras, and jotas, and for some of them he used the pseudonym Bota.

He formed his own orquesta típica in 1948, with which he developed his artistic career in the Uruguayan capital, as well as throughout the country and in several Argentine provinces. He began recording for Sondor the following year and would continue with that label, producing a prolific discography. He also recorded for Patria and Orfeo, among others.

With his orchestra, he accompanied many prominent tango figures from both Argentina and Uruguay. Among them were Nina Miranda, Carlos Roldán, Olga del Grossi, Félix Romero, Elsa Morán, Víctor Ruiz, Enrique Liste, Alfredo Cabral, Elsa del Campo, Juan Carlos Godoy, Miguel Ángel Maidana, and Horacio Castel, among others. In the 1950s, he participated with his orchestra in various musical comedies such as Barrio de luna y tamboril and Muchachos que peinan canas, in which he was joined by major radio theater figures like Mario Rivero, Julio Puente, and Juan Casanova.

His success in the region led him to undertake several tours in Japan.

Suffering from cardiovascular problems, he was hospitalized in mid-May under intensive care, from which he did not recover.

== Discography ==
=== 78 RPM ===
- Papas calientes / Esquinita de mi barrio (Sondor 5209. 1949)
- Triste camino / La cumparsita (Sondor 5241. 1949)
- El pollo Ricardo / Comme il faut (Sondor 5245. 1949)
- Atardecer / El chana (with his orchestra and Luis Alberto Fleitas. Sondor 5246. 1949)
- Cuando llora la milonga / Lágrimas y sonrisas (Sondor 5267)
- No te vayas mascarita / Los borrachos (with Carmelo Imperio. Sondor 5426)

=== LP ===
- Donato Racciatti y su Orquesta Típica (Sondor SLP-002)
- Donato Racciatti y su Orquesta Típica (Sondor SLP-009)
- Donato Racciatti y su Orquesta Típica (Sondor SLP-019)
- Donato Racciatti y su Orquesta Típica (Sondor SLP-021)
- Donato Racciatti y su Orquesta Típica (Sondor SLP-023)
- Lindo tiempo aquel de ayer (Sondor SLP-038)
- La historia (Sondor 33010. 1957)
- Barrio, luna y tamboril (Sondor 33013. 1958)
- Aquella vieja melodía (Sondor 33019. 1958)
- A media luz (con sus Tangueros del 900. Sondor 33026. 1959)
- Yo soy... (Sondor 33027. 1959)
- Donato Racciatti con Carlos Roldán (Sondor 33030. 1959)
- Recordando a Enrique Santos Discépolo (con su Orquesta Típica y la cantante Tania. Sondor 33031. 1959)
- Donato Racciatti y su Orquesta Típica (with Felix Romero. Sondor 33054. 1960)
- La novia (Sondor 33057. 1961)
- 25 años (with Carlos Roldan. Sondor 33065. 1962)
- Música uruguaya (Sondor 33073. 1963)
- Muchachos que peinan canas (Sondor 33076. 1963)
- Donato Racciatti y su Orquesta Típica (with Nina Miranda. Sondor 33078. 1963)
- La cumparsita (Sondor 33090. 1964)
- Uruguay canta! (Sondor 33096)
- Tangos de la vieja guardia (Sondor 33100)
- El patriota (Sondor 44001. 1964)
- Donato Racciatti y su orquesta típica (EP. Patria E.M.A. 1)
- Donato Racciatti y su orquesta típica (EP. Patria E.M.A. 2)
- Inspiraciones Orientales (Patria E.M.A. 3)
- Pa' tangueros solamente (Sondor 33110. 1970)
- El oriental (Sondor 33147. 1973)
- Donato Racciatti (Sondor 44000. 1973)
- El ritmo del tango (Sondor 44005. 1973)
- Grandes éxitos (Sondor 44015. 1975)
- Tu corazón (junto a Nina Miranda. Sondor 44095. 1979)
- El gran Donato Racciatti (Sondor 44110. 1979)
- Un corte, una quebrada... (Sondor 44404. 1985)
- Hasta siempre amor (with Olga Delgrossi. Sondor 44516. 1987)
- En Uruguay (Orfeo SCO 90881. 1987)
