= Heinrich Band =

German inventor

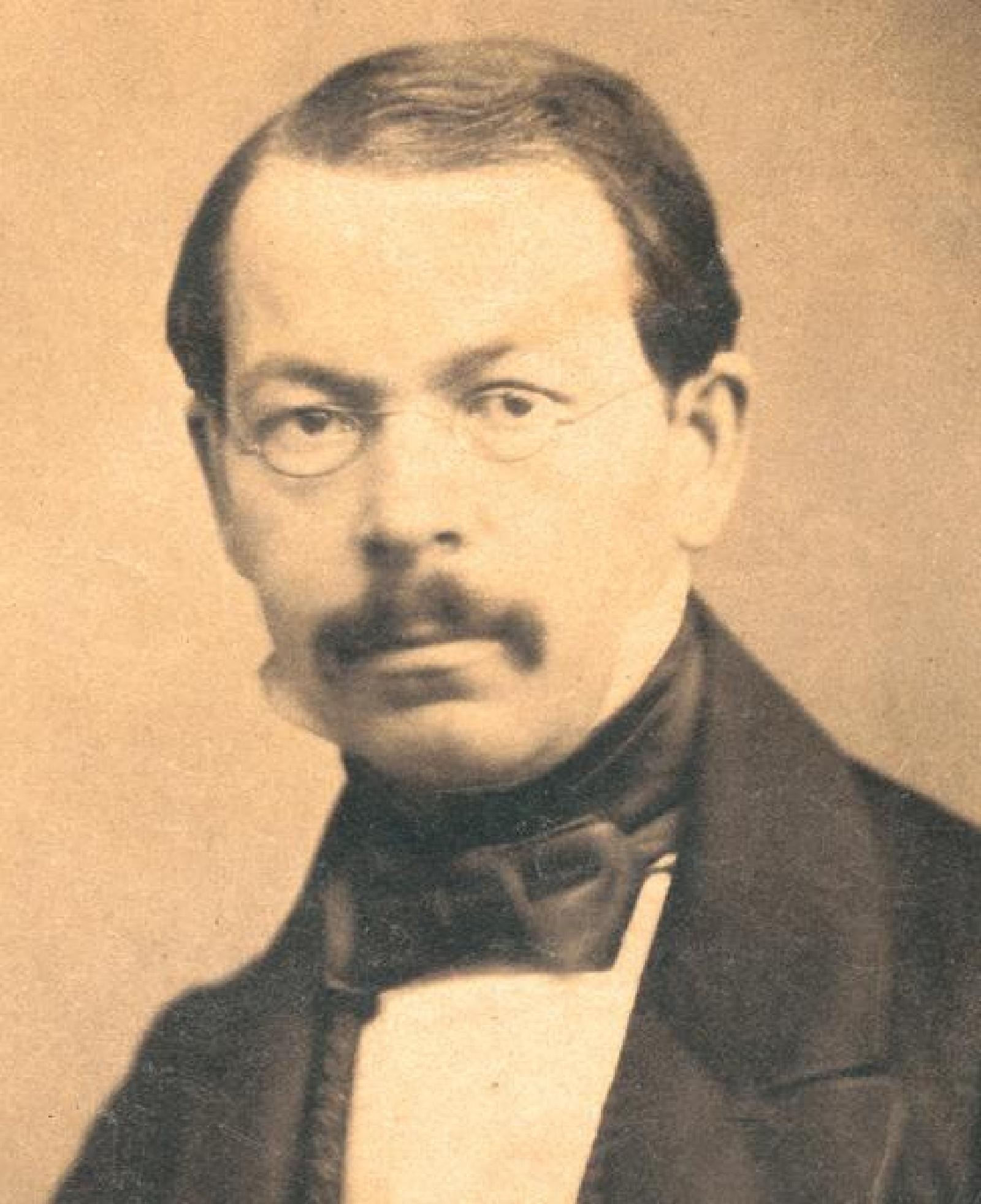
- Born: 1821; Krefeld, Province of Jülich-Cleves-Berg, Prussia, German Confederation
- Died: 1860 (aged 38–39)
- Occupation: Inventor

Heinrich Band (1821 – 1860) was the inventor of the bandonion (bandoneón); this 'hand-organ-like' instrument is a free reed instrument in the concertina family of instruments.
