= Armando Cupo =

Argentine musician

Oscar Armando Cupo (Buenos Aires, 26 December 1921 - 21 July 1990) was a piano player, composer and bandleader in Argentina during the golden age of tango.

In 1952 Cupo's orchestra invited the singer Roberto Rufino. He also worked with Alberto Morán in 1955. In 1960, Cupo created an orchestra "Estrellas de Buenos Aires". In 1972, he was one of the founders of Sexteto Mayor orchestra.

Armando Cupo was the composer of tangos “Con este corazón”, “Siempre a tiempo” and “Una vida más”.
