= Enrique Alessio =

Argentine musician

Enrique Carmelo Alessio

Personal details
- Born: January 8, 1918 Buenos Aires, Argentina
- Died: September 8, 2000 (aged 82) Mar del Plata, Buenos Aires, Argentina

Enrique Carmelo Alessio (January 8, 1918 – September 8, 2000) was an Argentine musician. He is famed for his bandoneón accordion skills. Alessio was also a composer and orchestra leader best remembered for his compositions "Amar Para Qué," "Bien Porteña," "Cantemos Corazón," "Te Odio y te Quiero," and "Un Tango para mi Vieja".
