= Gabriel Merlino =

Musician (born 1977)

Gabriel Merlino (born 1977) is one of the most important bandoneon players from the new generation. From 8 years old he started with bandoneon studies. His professors were Alejandro Barletta, the biggest bandoneon classical concertist in history, and Marcos Madrigal. His professional career began when Merlino was 12, playing in chamera orquestras, tango shows and having the support of Leopoldo Federico or Jose Libertella from Sexteto Mayor. In 1995 he created Nuevo Siglo Tango, a quartet who was pioneer from the new generation of Tango Groups in Argentina. With Nuevo Siglo he performed between 1996 and 2001, more than 800 concerts, in theaters, radio and television (he was, for example, the first bandoneon player on giving Bandoneon Cathedra on Argentine TV). Between 2002 and 2010 he made 20 tours around USA, Germany, France, Austria, Belgium, Switzerland, Lebanon and Netherlands, with his bandoneon solos show and with his different ensembles. Merlino recorded in 2005 “Bandoneon Dreams”, the first world music bandoneon recording, with jazz, Latin, baroque, folk, and tango, in standards form and own compositions too.
