= Juan Cambareri =

Juan Cambareri (15 April 1916 – 18 February 1992) (nickname: El Mago del Bandoneón) was an Argentine bandoneon player, composer and bandleader (tango musical genre) during the Golden Age of tango.
