= Manuel Buzón =

Argentinian composer, pianist and singer

image Aqui Tango magazine

Manuel Buzón (December 18, 1904 – July 14, 1954) was a tango pianist, singer, leader and composer.

== Biography ==
Buzón was born in Flores, a barrio of Buenos Aires, to Spanish immigrants Manuel and Dolores Moreno. He was a performer from an early age; at the age of 10 he performed at a Club Social América event. In 1925 Buzón became a regular performer on Argentine radio. Between May 1929 and February 1930, he toured Spain playing in Barcelona, Madrid, Murcia, Alicante, Cartagena and Sevilla. Buzón resumed performing in August 1930 and returned to Argentine radio in 1931. He continued to appear on Argentine radio into the 1940s and he toured Argentina with his orchestra. Between 1942 and 1943 he made a number of recordings for Odeon Records.

Buzón died on July 14, 1954, aged only 49. He is remembered as a composer that bridged the gap between old and modern tango and a musician that helped to spread the popularity of the genre in Argentina and in Europe.
