= Vicente Greco =

Argentine composer

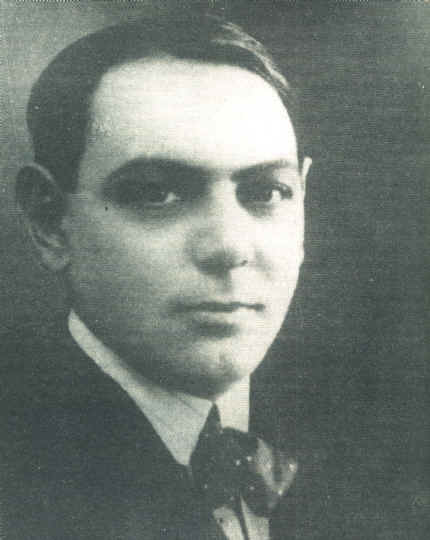

Background information
- Born: 3 February 1888; Buenos Aires, Argentina
- Died: 5 October 1924 (aged 36) Buenos Aires, Argentina
- Genres: Tango
- Instrument: Bandoneon
- Works: Columbia Records

Vicente Greco (3 February 1888 – 5 October 1924) was an Argentine composer, conductor, and bandoneon player of tango music. He had a significant role in the spread of tango music from the suburbs into the cities, where it became very popular.

== Life story ==
He was born in Buenos Aires, the son of Genaro Greco and Victoria Santo, a couple of modest means who brought up Vicente and seven other children. His family's low income caused Vicente to work from a young age; his schooling was interrupted, and he instead became a newsboy in the streets of Buenos Aires. Some of his siblings were also musically-inclined. Vicente's musical career began around 1903 during his teens, when he played guitar, complemented by singing, for fun.

Greco learned to play a concertina that had been gifted to his parents, who later gave the 14-year-old prodigy a bandoneon of his own. The first tango he played was "La Tirana", and he initially worked in bars and lounges that were popular in La Boca, one of the main immigrant neighbourhoods in Buenos Aires. He debuted in San Pedro, later playing in San Nicolás, Baradero, Rosario, and elsewhere.

In San Pedro, he was able to know and play music with leading performers of his era, including Prudencio Aragón (nicknamed El Johnny), Ernesto Zambonini (El Rengo), Lorenzo (El Negro) and Juan Borguessi (El Taruguito); but in San Pedro he also had a serious accident due to a stage collapse, which could have contributed to his early death.

Greco obtained a harmonium that he used for practice and for composing. He had dark eyes and was short, with a tendency toward frequent good humour. He led the first group known as an orquesta típica, which means an orchestra specializing in tango, and that group was called Orquesta Típica Criolla.

Don Juan (3:29)
Piece by Ernesto Ponzio played by the Orquesta Típica Criolla led by Vicente Greco, Buenos Aires, 1910

As a self-taught musician, he initially needed the help of fellow musicians to commit his music to paper. Among the venues where Greco played was the Rodríguez Peña Salon, in which, one evening in 1911, the tango "Rodríguez Peña" was premiered with a very warm reception by the audience, who followed their applause by carrying him on their shoulders victoriously along the street outside. Also in 1911, he was the first tango musician to be hired at the Armenonville, a musical cabaret that became one of the main centres of diffusion of the tango.

His tangos sold well; 22,000 copies of his first tango El morochito (written in 1905), were sold, "Rodríguez Peña" sold 12,000 copies, and "El flete" sold 6,000 copies in three months. Numbers such as "Rodríguez Peña", "La viruta" or El flete, were classics of the genre. The famous singer Carlos Gardel was his personal friend and a musical collaborator.

Greco's recording work began around 1910. He was accompanied by the same instrumentalists with whom he had already appeared at the Café El Estribo: Lorenzo Labissier (bandoneon), Domingo Greco (piano), Vicente Pecci (El Tano) (flute) and Palito Abatte or, on occasions, Francisco Canaro (violin).

== Tangos by Greco ==
- Alma porteña
- Argentina
- Ausencia
- Barba’e choclo
- Chicotazo
- Criollo viejo
- De raza
- El cuzquito
- El eléctrico
- El estribo
- El flete
- El garrotazo
- El mejicano
- El morochito (1905)
- El pangaré
- El pato de la Z
- El perverso
- El pibe
- Estoy penando
- Italianita
- Kiki
- La canota
- La gauchita
- La infanta
- La milonguera
- La paica
- La percanta está triste
- La regadera
- La viruta
- Los soñadores
- María Angélica
- Máscara dura
- Montaraz
- Muela careada
- Noche brava
- Ojos negros (1910)
- Pachequito
- Pobre corazoncito
- Popoff
- Pueyrredón
- ¡Qué nene!
- Racing Club
- Rodríguez Peña
- Saladillo
- Zazá
