= Ricardo Malerba =

Ricardo Francisco Malerba (nickname: Luz Demar) was an Argentine bandoneon player, composer and bandleader (tango musical genre) during the golden age of Argentine tango.

Among outstanding compositions can be named: “Aristocracia”, “Cuando florezcan las rosas”, “Mariana” (waltzes), “Violín”, “La piba de los jazmines”, “Embrujamiento”, “Taruchito” (tangos).
