= Social dance =

Participatory dance focused on human interaction

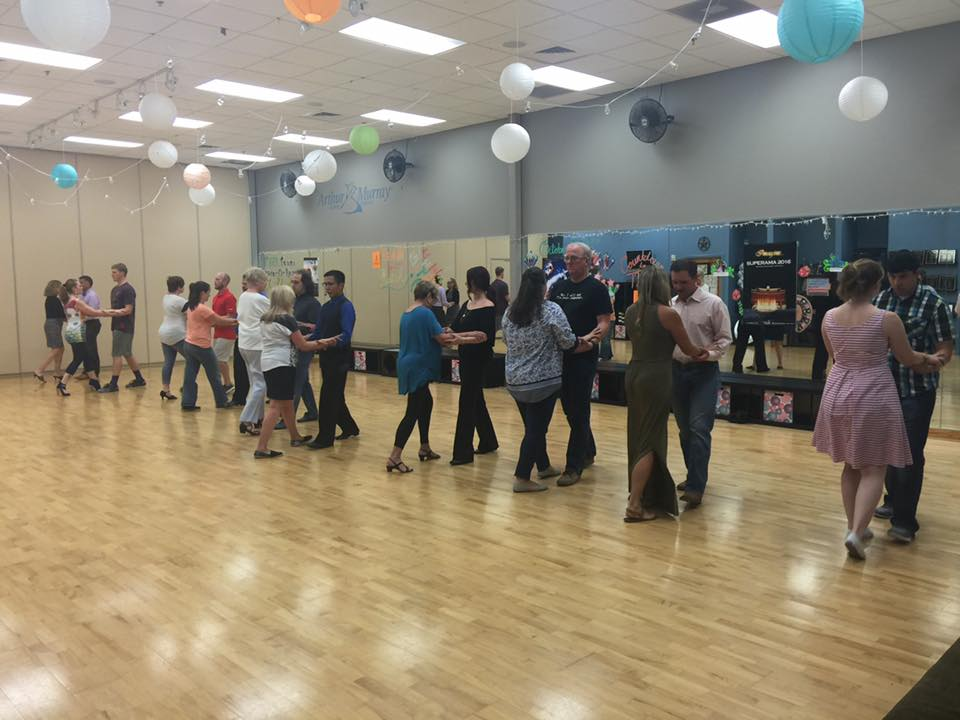
A social dancing or ballroom dancing group class taught at the Arthur Murray Dance Studio in The Woodlands, Texas.

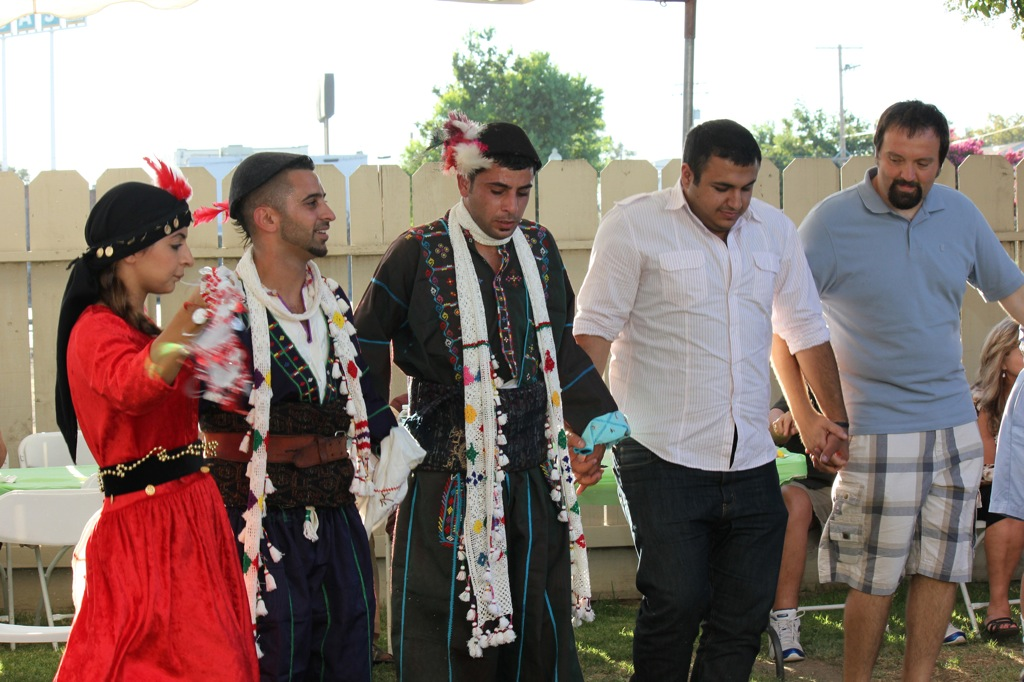
Khigga is the most common social folk dance among Assyrian people.

Social dances are dances that have social functions and context. Social dances are intended for participation rather than performance. They are often danced merely to socialise and for entertainment, though they may have ceremonial, competitive and erotic functions.

Many social dances of European origin are in recent centuries partner dances (see Ballroom dance) but elsewhere there may instead be circle dances or line dances.

== Social dance in western cultures ==
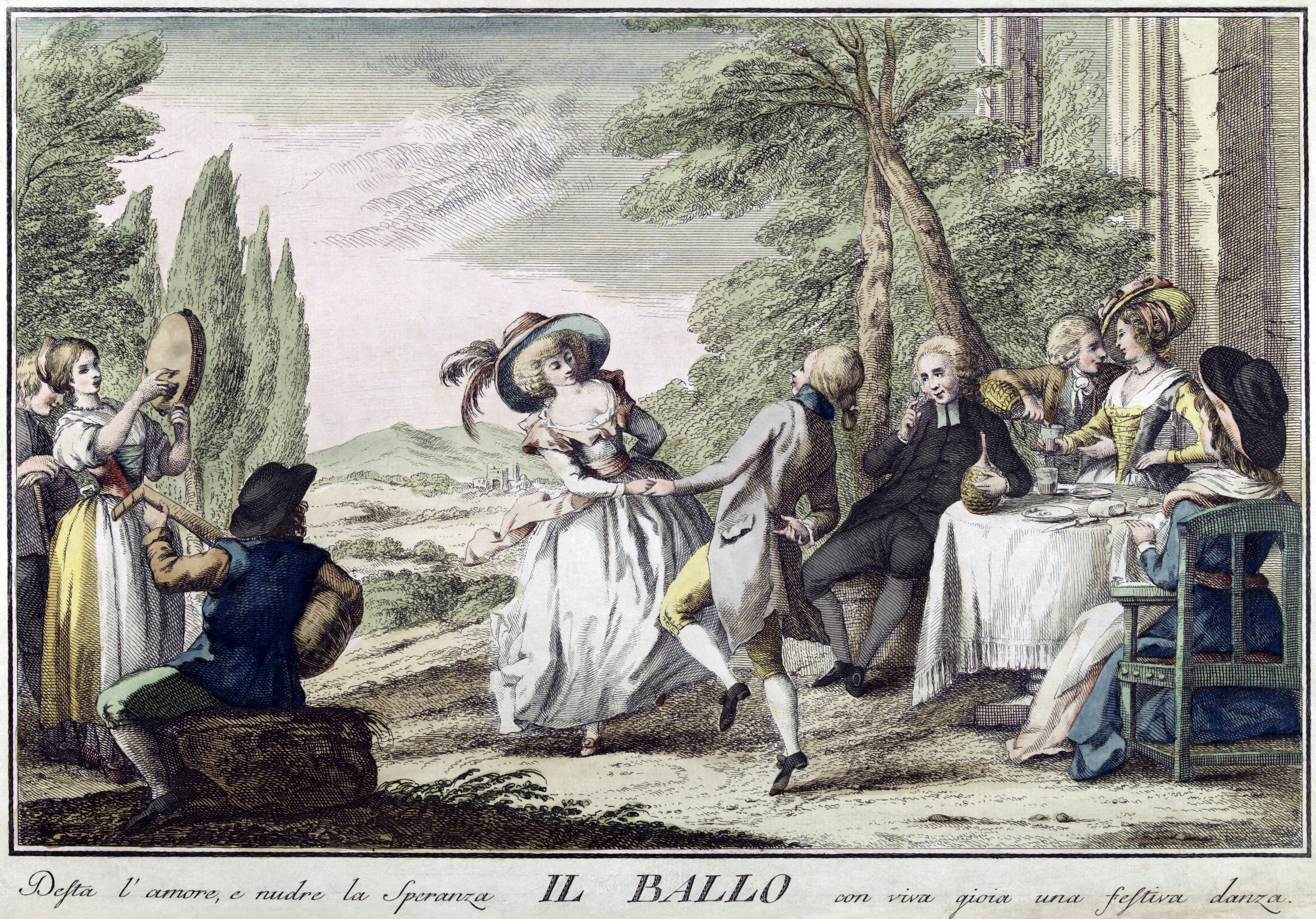
Eighteenth-century social dance. Translated caption: A cheerful dance awakens love and feeds hope with lively joy, (Florence, 1790)

The types of dance performed in social gatherings change with social values. Social dance music of the 14th century has been preserved in manuscript, though without proper choreography, for dances such as the ballo, carol, stampita, saltarello, trotto and roto. The 15th century is the first period from which written records of dances exist. A manuscript from Brussels highlights the Burgundian court dance, which spread all over Europe, referred to as the basse dance in which a large group perform a series of steps in triple time. Italian courts danced balli, with a wide array of choreographed rhythms, steps and positions for the dancers. These were documented in instruction books written by the dance masters who choreographed them for the courts.

Social dances of lower classes were not recorded until the Late Renaissance. According to Richard Powers, courtiers in the late 16th century continually had to "prove themselves through their social skills, especially through dance." Recorded social dances of the late 16th century include the pavane and the Canary dance. Thoinot Arbeau's book Orchésographie describes peasant branles as well as the 16th century basse danse and la volta. The peasants from the countryside supplied new dances to the court as the old ones' novelty wore out.

Scottish country dancing

During the Baroque Era court balls served to display social status. A formal ball opened with a branle in which couples stood in a line in order of their place in the social hierarchy, the most highly regarded couples dancing first. The Menuet and the Gavotte gained popularity. Balls often ended with an English country dance. France gained a pre-eminence in dance, but the French Revolution created a shift away from formality.

During the Regency Era, from 1811 to 1830, the Quadrille became the most popular dance in England and France. The Quadrille consisted of a large variety of steps that skimmed the ground, such as chassé and jeté. Most other dances of this era, such as the Mazurka, were performed in lines and squares.

The waltz, which arrived in Britain toward the end of the Napoleonic Wars, was a partner dance in which partners danced more closely than had previously been considered acceptable. In the waltz, neither partner led. Individuals danced as equals, which was new at the time. The Polka was another dance that arose during this time in which partners were scandalously close. According to Powers, the dances of this time were "fresh, inventive, youthful, and somewhat daring," which mirrored society at the time.

=== 20th century United States ===
Contra dancing in the United States

Towards the end of the 19th century, Americans were tiring of the court dances of their grandparents' era. In the early 20th century, Americans began pairing Victorian dances such as the Two-Step with Ragtime music. Other dances included the African American Cakewalk, and animal dances such as the Turkey Trot. The most popular social dance of the time was the One-Step. The dance consisted of couples taking one step on each beat of the music, so even beginners could participate.

The introduction of the phonograph record marked a shift toward dancing to recorded music, as radio stations, jukeboxes, and sock hops played records to dance to.

Swing dance in the 1930s has grown in popularity, taking many dance forms, some of them, such as Lindy Hop or West Coast Swing have survived to today.

Rock 'n' roll in the 1950s brought about a shift in social dancing toward rebelliousness. This shift was seen especially in teenagers who did not want to dance the same steps that their parents did. The dancing was mostly swing based but had a variations in different regions. Couples began dancing as individuals for the first time, sending the message that there did not have to be a leader and a follower.

The mid-20th century also saw a strong influence from Latin American dance, particularly from the Caribbean. In Cuba, Spanish colonial ballroom traditions blended with Indigenous Taíno forms and the music and dance of enslaved Africans, creating a diverse range of partnered social dances. Many of these styles spread to the United States through immigration and cultural exchange, especially in growing Latino communities in New York, Miami, and Los Angeles.

The 1950s brought nationwide "dance crazes" such as the mambo and the cha-cha-chá, which were popularized through nightclubs, television, and touring orchestras. These styles not only attracted Latino audiences but also became a major part of mainstream American popular culture. In the United States, the mambo craze was fueled by bandleaders like Pérez Prado whose big-band mambo music enjoyed major popularity in the 1950s.

By the late 1960s and early 1970s, these Cuban and Puerto Rican influences converged into salsa, a hybrid genre of music and dance that became a fixture of social life in urban centers. The term "salsa" was popularized by figures such as Johnny Pacheco, founder of Fania Records, who helped transform various Afro-Caribbean musical styles into a unified, mainstream genre.

Salsa also gave rise to salsa congresses, which are multi-day festivals featuring workshops, performances, competitions, and social dancing. These events, originally focused on salsa, have since expanded to include other partner dance styles such as bachata (which has grown in popularity), as well as more recent imports like Kizomba and Zouk.
