= Richard Powers (dance historian) =

American historian

- Born: March 25, 1948 (age 78)
- Education: Purdue University (BS); Stanford University (MS)
- Occupations: Social dance instructor, dance historian
- Spouse: Tracey Powers
- Awards: Lloyd W. Dinkelspiel Award Post-Corbett Award for Artist of the Year
- Website: richardpowers.com

Richard Powers (born March 25, 1948) is an expert in American social dance, noted for his choreographies for dozens of stage productions and films, and his workshops in Paris, Rome, Prague, London, Venice, Geneva, St. Petersburg and Tokyo as well as across the U.S. and Canada. He has been researching and reconstructing historic social dances for twenty-five years and is currently a full-time instructor at Stanford University Dance Division. He teaches a variety of social dance history and practicum classes for the dance division of the Stanford University Theater and Performance Studies Department. He joined the Dance Faculty in 1992 and serves as a faculty liaison to the Friends of Dance at Stanford organization.

== Early life and education ==
Richard powers grew up in Proctor, Vermont. He went on to attend Purdue University, where he earned a degree in Mechanical Engineering, and went on to Stanford to get his master's in an individually designed major, product design with a focus in the creative process.

== Engineering and design work ==
Upon graduating from Stanford, Powers moved to Cincinnati, Ohio, where he worked as an engineer, graphic designer, and director of an arts collective. He also founded an artists collective and studied calligraphy, tai chi, and kendo. Powers served as Chief Engineer for Alpha Designs, Inc and Vice President of the Genesis Design. Clients included: UNESCO, NASA, AT&T, DuPont, Corning Glass, Proctor & Gamble, Coca-Cola, Kenner Toys. Powers holds patents for eight devices, seven of which were sold, including the trash compactor, leak-proof hand sprayer, childproof cap, and tampon inserter.

Powers exhibited multimedia constructions at the Contemporary Arts Center and at the Cincinnati Arts Consortium. His musical performances included Trio for Ten Keyboards for the National Theater Company, and a performance of electronic music at the Cincinnati Krohn Conservatory. Powers founded and directed Co-Works, an intermedia collective of twelve artists. Powers participated in the International Conference on Media Studies for their documentary on Co-Works. While Vice President of Geneses Design Group, he worked for American Avents Corp, one of the largest disco chains in the country. He designed, photographed and programmed multi-screen audiovisual shows for clubs, and completed logo and club interior design.

== Dance teaching ==
Powers taught at the School for Creative and Performing Arts at Xavier University, Northern Kentucky University, and Ohio University before becoming a full-time instructor at Stanford University's Dance Division in 1992. Powers' most famous course, Social Dance I, introduces Stanford students to some of the most common forms of social dance including bachata, waltz, salsa, tango, and polka. He is famous for his incorporation philosophical, work, and life advice into his courses through 'halftime breaks,' where he reads essays from former students and connects the principles of partnered dancing to a fulfilling life and career.

Richard has gone on to mentor a plethora of social dancers who have spread dance instruction across the country, notably Nick and Melissa Enge, who teach at the University of Texas at Austin. Powers officiated their wedding and continues to serve as a mentor.

== Dance organizations ==
Powers co-founded the Flying Cloud Academy of Vintage Dance (1981) to produce large-scale monthly recreations of Victorian and Ragtime Balls. Formed the Flying Cloud Troupe, a 30-member performing company (1982) and co-founded the supporting Fleeting Moments Waltz & Quickstep Orchestra.

Powers started and directed the Stanford Vintage Dance Ensemble (1992) and serves as an advisor and choreographer for the Swingtime Dance Troupe.

== Awards ==
- Powers was selected by the Centennial Issue of Stanford Magazine as one of Stanford University's most notable graduates of its first century and was awarded the Lloyd W. Dinkelspiel Award for distinctive and exceptional contributions to education at Stanford University (1999).
- Recipient of the Post-Corbett Award, Cincinnati's foremost arts recognition (1992).
- Powers was selected as an outstanding design student to represent Stanford nationally and receive the Industrial Designers Society of America's Award of Merit.
- As a Purdue undergrad he received the Sherwood Award for Creativity in Engineering, offered by the combined Purdue Schools of Engineering.
- Powers won 25 Art Director's awards for graphic design and the Mead Award for graphic design.

== Choreographies in film ==
- Ragtime era dance for the 1989 film Cold Sassy Tree
- 19th century ballroom dances for the 1989 film North and South
- Ragtime era dance for the 1994 film Spring Awakening
- Victorian ballroom dances for the 1986 TV film Mrs. Perkins' Ball

== Extended Links ==
- Richard Powers Faculty Page
- Swingtime Official Website
- Powers' biography
- Powers' writing about dance and dancing
- Richard Powers' homepage
