= Bandoneon =

Type of concertina

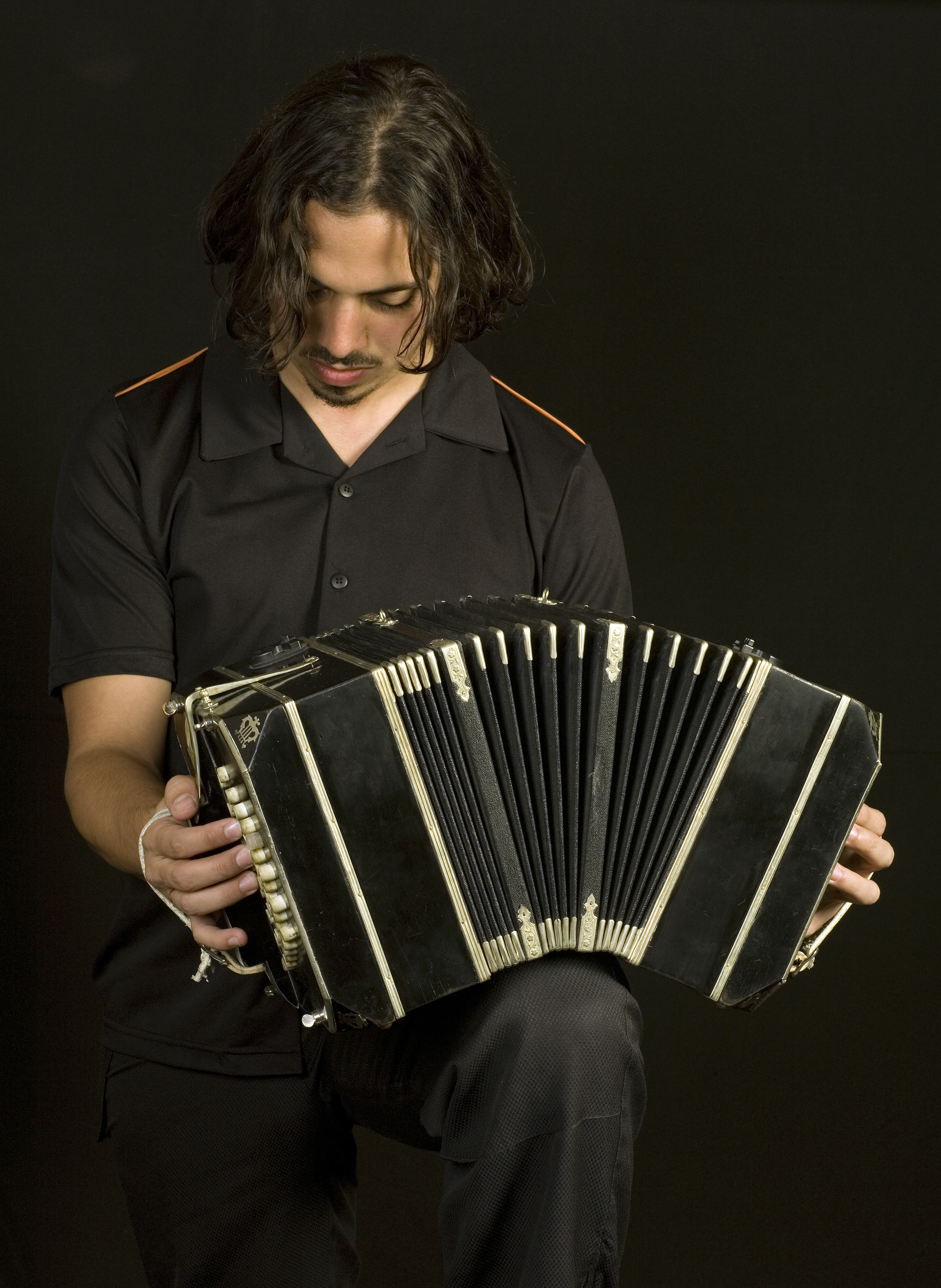

Other instrument
- Classification: Aerophone; Free reed; Wind
- Hornbostel–Sachs classification: 412.132 (Free-reed aerophone)
- Developed: Germany mid-1800s

Related instruments
- Chemnitzer concertina, concertina, harmonica, melodeon, reed organ, yu

Musicians
- Ástor Piazzolla, Aníbal Troilo

(play) A bandoneon playing modern tango

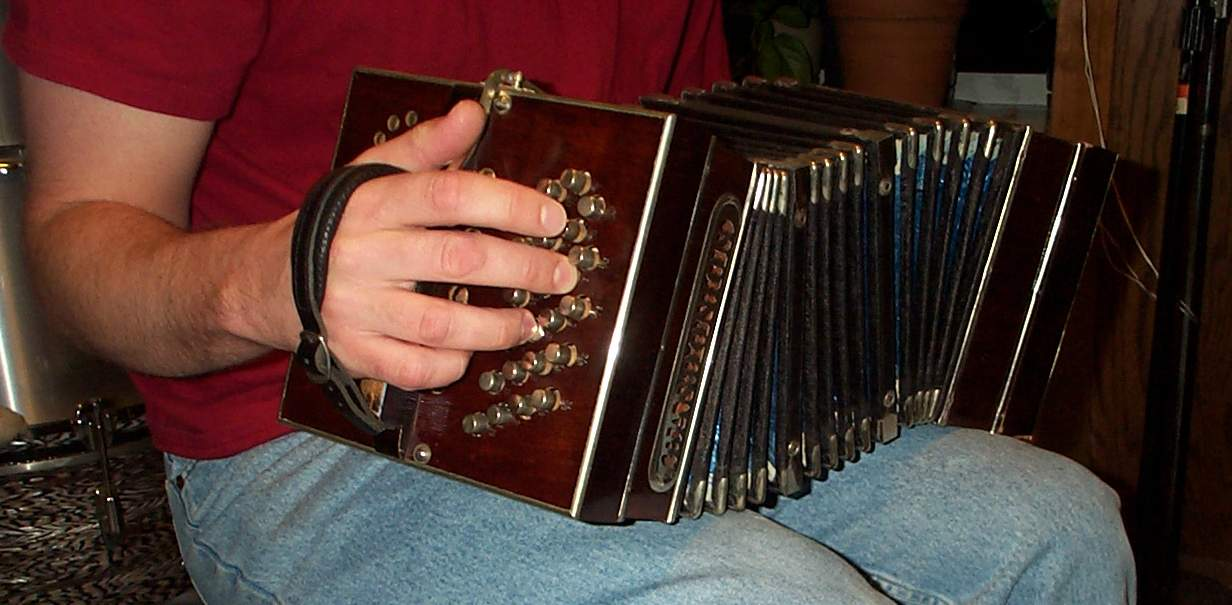
Early bandoneon, c. 1905

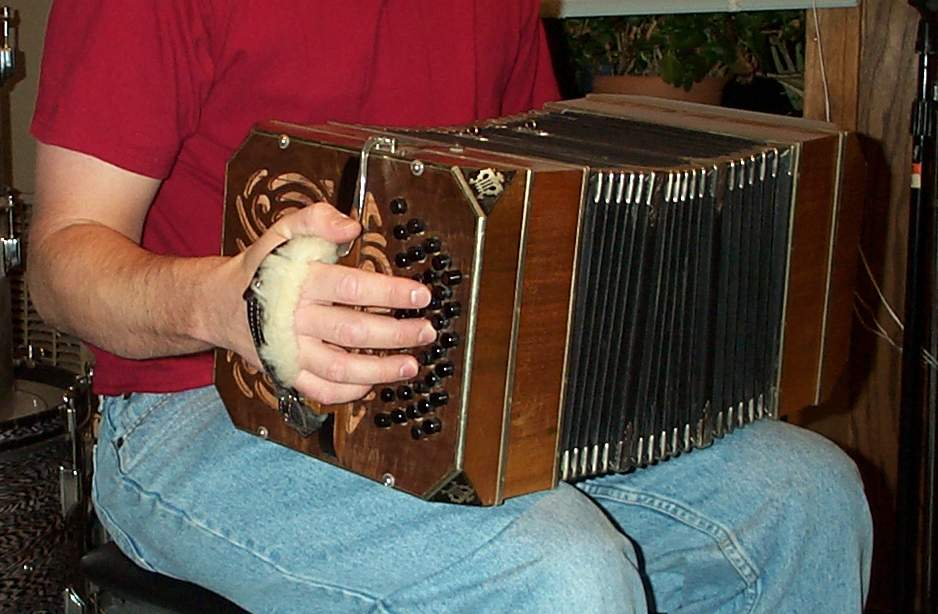
Alfred Arnold bandoneon, c. 1949

The bandoneon (Spanish: bandoneón) or bandonion is a type of concertina particularly popular in Argentina and Uruguay, used in most tango ensembles. As with other members of the concertina family, it is held between the hands, and played by pulling and pushing air through bellows, routing it through sets of tuned metal reeds by pressing the instrument's buttons. Unlike most accordions, bandoneons always employ the same sets of reeds to produce their sound, and do not usually have the register switches common on accordions. Nevertheless, the bandoneon can be played very expressively, using various bellows pressures and other techniques. The left and right hand have different timbres due to the wooden box on the left side which gives the left hand a nasal and muted timbre, in contrast with the right hand which is usually bright and sharp.

== History ==
The Bandonion, so named by the German instrument dealer Heinrich Band (1821–1860), was originally intended as an instrument for religious and popular music of the day, in contrast to its predecessor, the German concertina (Konzertina), which had predominantly been used in folk music. It is believed that around 1870, German and Italian emigrants and sailors brought the instrument to Argentina, where it was adopted into the nascent genre of tango music, a descendant of the earlier milonga. However, there is no documentation of how exactly the bandoneon was introduced to the Rio de La Plata region. The instrument was also adopted in to genres such as the Chamamé.

By 1910 bandoneons were being produced in Germany expressly for the Argentine and Uruguayan markets, with 25,000 shipping to Argentina in 1930 alone. However, their declining popularity and the disruption of German manufacturing during World War II led to the end of bandoneon mass-production.

The bandoneon was introduced to tango music with prominent composers and bandoneonists such as Eduardo Arolas and Vicente Greco and later was developed into the sextet formation (with two bandoneons) with Pedro Maffia and Pedro Laurenz whose style and technique established the base for the bandoneon section in the orquesta típica.

Original instruments can be seen in a number of German museums, such as the Preuss family's Bandoneon Museum in Lichtenberg and the Steinhart family's collection in Kirchzarten, Freiburg, which has now been moved to the Tango- and Bandoneon museum in Staufen since July 2014.

Historically, bandoneons were produced primarily in Germany and never in Argentina itself, despite their popularity in that country. As a result, by the 2000s vintage bandoneons had become rare and expensive (costing around $4,000), limiting the opportunities for prospective bandeonists. In 2014, the National University of Lanús announced its plan to develop an affordable Argentine-made bandoneon, which it hoped to market for one-third to one-half of the cost of vintage instruments.

== Technique ==
The left-hand buttons, on the left of the diagram, play bass notes, The right-hand buttons, on the right side, play higher-pitched notes. Each button plays a different note if the bellows are pulled open or pushed closed.

As with other members of the concertina family, the bandoneon is held between the hands, and pulling and pushing actions force air through bellows and then through particular reeds as selected by pressing the instrument's buttons. As with other concertinas, the button action is parallel to the motion of the bellows, and not perpendicular to it as with an accordion.

=== Bisonoric ===
Unlike the piano accordion, but in similar fashion to diatonic free-reed instruments such as the melodeon, Anglo concertina, or harmonica, a given bandoneon button produces different notes on the push and the pull. This means that each keyboard has two layouts: one for opening notes, and one for closing notes. Since the right and left hand layouts are also different, the bandoneon player is faced with learning four completely different keyboard layouts. Because of this challenge, many tango players play almost entirely on the draw/pull, and largely avoid the close stroke (using the air release button to quickly close the bellows, before resuming playing on the pull stroke).

These keyboard layouts are not structured to make it easy to play scale passages of single notes: they were originally laid out to facilitate playing chords in familiar keys, for supporting singers of religious music in small churches with no organ or harmonium, or for clergy requiring a portable instrument (missionaries, traveling evangelists, army and navy chaplains, and so forth). The original more limited bandoneon layouts were supplemented more and more over time with extra chromatic keys, as the musical needs of bandoneon players became more demanding, leading to many variations.

Because of their origin in earlier diatonic systems that were gradually expanded to include other notes of the chromatic scale over time, bisonoric instruments are often referred to as "diatonic" bandoneons, although, with the later instruments, as used in tango, this description became a misnomer, as the instruments are now capable of playing in all keys. Diatonic can also be re-analysed, through folk etymology, to refer to the two (di) different tones played by each key, that is to say, bisonoric.

=== Unisonoric ===
While the standard bandoneon is bisonoric (different note on push and pull), with an idiosyncratic and difficult to learn layout, some bandoneon variants are unisonoric or monosonoric (same note on push and pull). These include the Ernst Kusserow and Charles Peguri systems, both introduced around 1925. These have some popularity in Europe, but in Argentina, the 142-tone 71-key rheinische system still dominates, as most tango repertoire was written on, and is idiomatic to, this system, and therefore certain runs and scale passages written for the tango bandoneon are more difficult on the unisonoric system.

In the 21st century, further efforts have been made to create a simplified bandoneon, with keyboards that mimic the isomorphic layouts of chromatic button accordions. These "hybrid bandoneons" are internally identical to the traditional bandoneon, and preserve the tonal qualities and response of the instrument, but are intended to be easier to learn, more suitable for improvisation, and more accessible to players of other free-reed instruments. They have a similar aim to earlier chromatic bandoneon systems, but endeavour to overcome some of their ergonomic limitations by allowing the hands to move more freely, as with the western chromatic button accordion, or eastern bayan.

Unisonoric instruments, particularly in the Peguri system, are often referred to as "chromatic bandoneons", having been designed from the beginning with the expressed purpose of being fully chromatic instruments, unlike their bisonoric cousins.

== Players ==
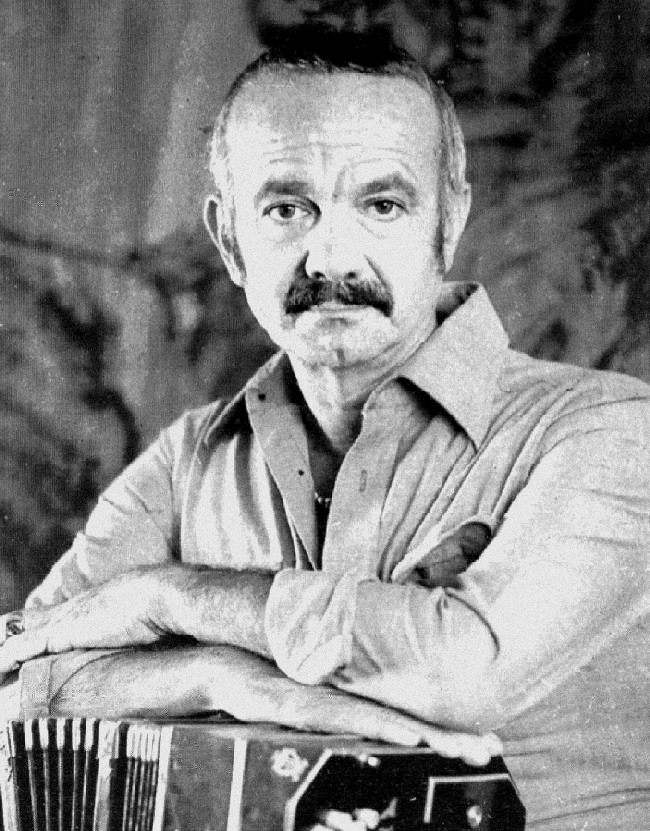
Ástor Piazzolla in 1971

The Argentinian bandleader, composer, arranger, and tango performer Aníbal Troilo was a leading 20th-century proponent of the bandoneon. The bandoneon player and composer Ástor Piazzolla played and arranged in Troilo's orchestra from 1939 to 1944. Piazzolla's "Fugata" from 1969 showcases the instrument, which plays the initial fugue subject on the 1st statement, then moves on to the outright tango after the introduction. With his solos and accompaniment on the bandoneon, Piazzolla combined a musical composition much derived from classical music (which he had studied intensively in his formative years) with traditional instrumental tango, to form nuevo tango, his new interpretation of the genre.

== List of manufacturers ==
A list of some current and historical bandoneon manufacturers:

- Bandoneón AZ - Ángel y Gabriel Zullo (Argentina)
- Bandoneones A. A. Alfred Arnold (Germany, until 1948)
- Bandoneones F. F. - Juan Pablo Fredes (Gambier, La Plata, Argentina)
- Bandoneones Baltazar Estol (Argentina)
- Bandoneones Toscano (Mendoza, Argentina), Vicente Toscano, fabricante y restaurador de bandoneones.
- Bandonion & Concertinafabrik Klingenthal (Germany)
- Mario Bianco (Uruguay)
- Castagnari (Italy)
- Danielson Industria de Acordeões e Bandoneões (Brazil)
- D. & J. Trupin SARL (France)
- Oscar Fisher (Argentina)
- Giustozzi (Italy)
- Handzuginstrumente Carlsfeld (Eibenstock, Germany)
- Klaus Gutjahr (Germany)
- Harry Geuns Bandoneons (Belgium)
- Uwe Hartenhauer (Klingenthal, Germany)
- Museo Luis Alfredo Mariani (La Reja, Moreno, Argentina)
- Pigini Fratelli & C. snc (Italy)
- Premier Bandoneonbau Peter Spende (Germany)
- Stagi Accordions & Bandoneons (Italy)
- Victoria Accordions Company (Italy)

== List of repair and tuning services ==
=== Argentina ===
- Sergio Palestrini (restoration)
- Luciano Dujmovic (tuning)
- Damián Gutlein
- Taller Galvan (restoration)
- Daniel Barrientos
- Fuelles Rial (bellows)
- Fuelles del Sur

=== Germany ===
Carsten Heveling

== Prominent players ==
- Vicente Greco (1888–1924)
- Augusto Berto (1889–1953)
- Eduardo Arolas (1892–1924)
- Anselmo Aieta (1896–1964)
- Osvaldo Fresedo (1897–1984)
- Pedro Maffia (1899–1967)
- Pedro Laurenz (1902–1972)
- Ricardo Malerba (1905–1974)
- Miguel Caló (1907–1972)
- Aníbal Troilo (1914–1975)
- Hector Varela (1914–1987)
- Juan Cambareri (1916–1992)
- Domingo Federico (1916–2000)
- Alberto Caracciolo (1918–1994)
- Enrique Alessio (1918–2000)
- Astor Piazzolla (1921–1992)
- Leopoldo Federico (1927–2014)
- Juan José Mosalini (1943–2022)
- Rubén Juárez (1947–2010)
- Claudio Constantini
- Héctor del Curto
- Per Arne Glorvigen
- Gianni Iorio
- Ryōta Komatsu
- Rodolfo Mederos
- Gabriel Merlino
- Dino Saluzzi

== Construction ==
Exterior:

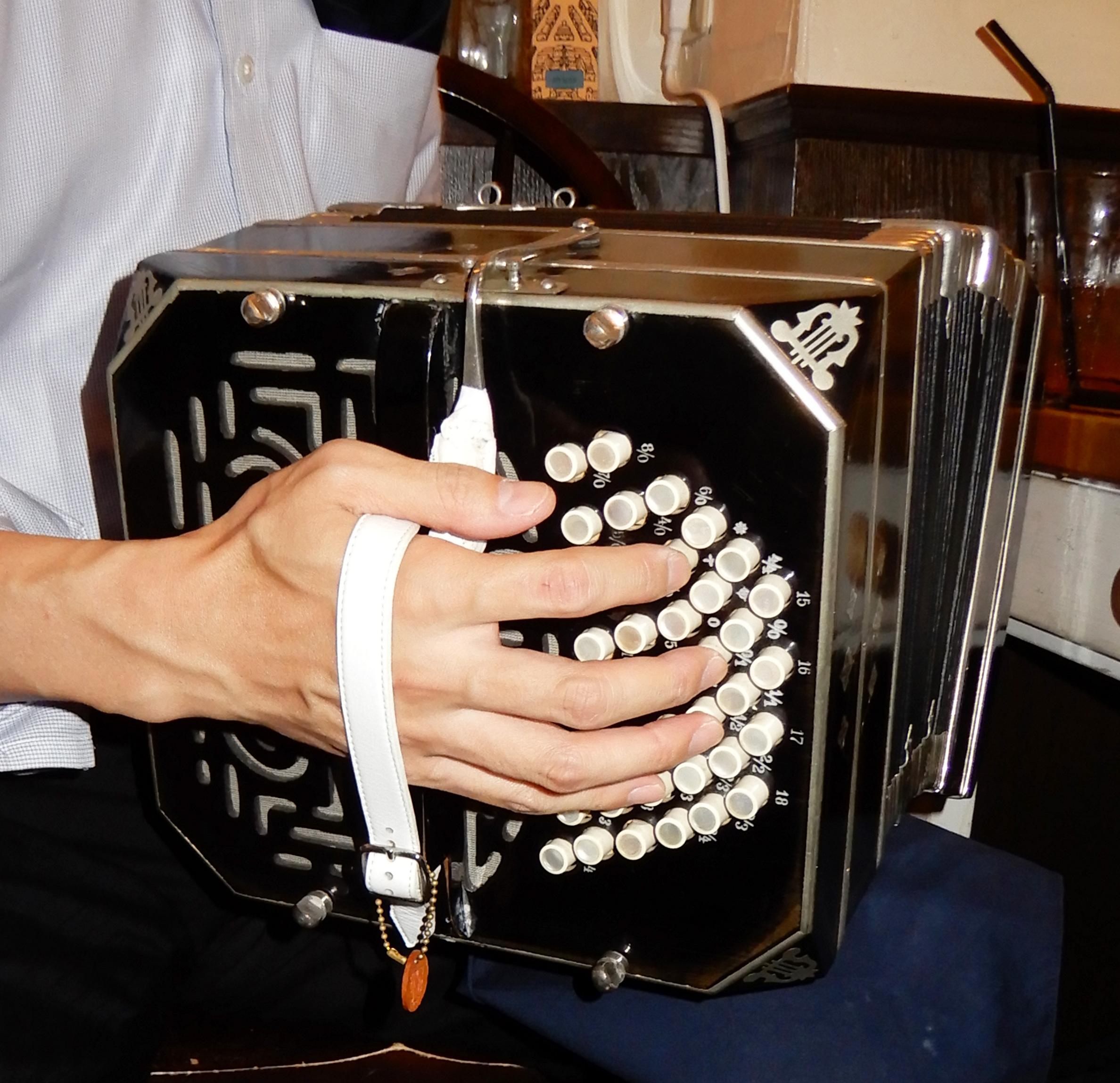
Alfred Arnold bandoneon. Right

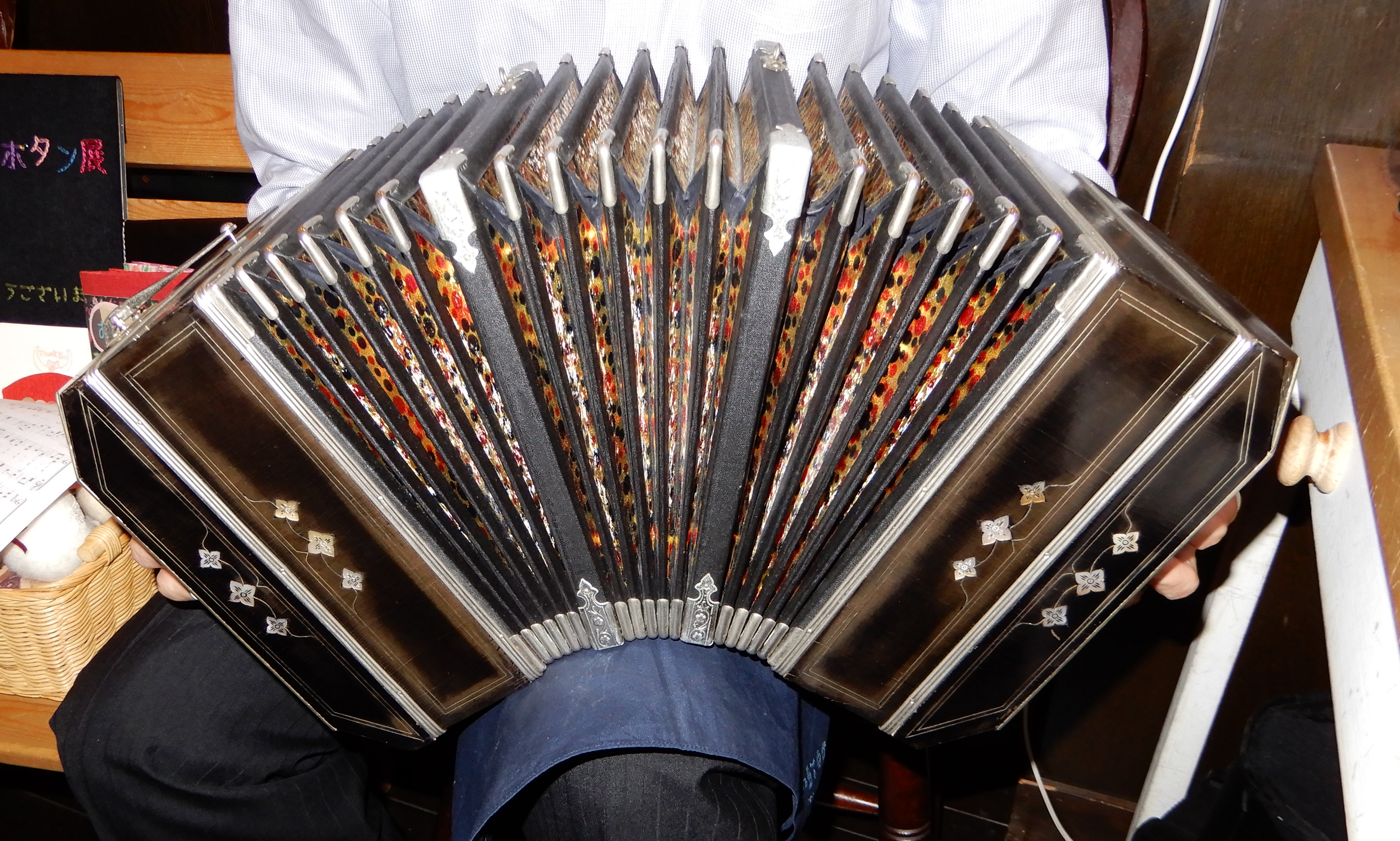
Center

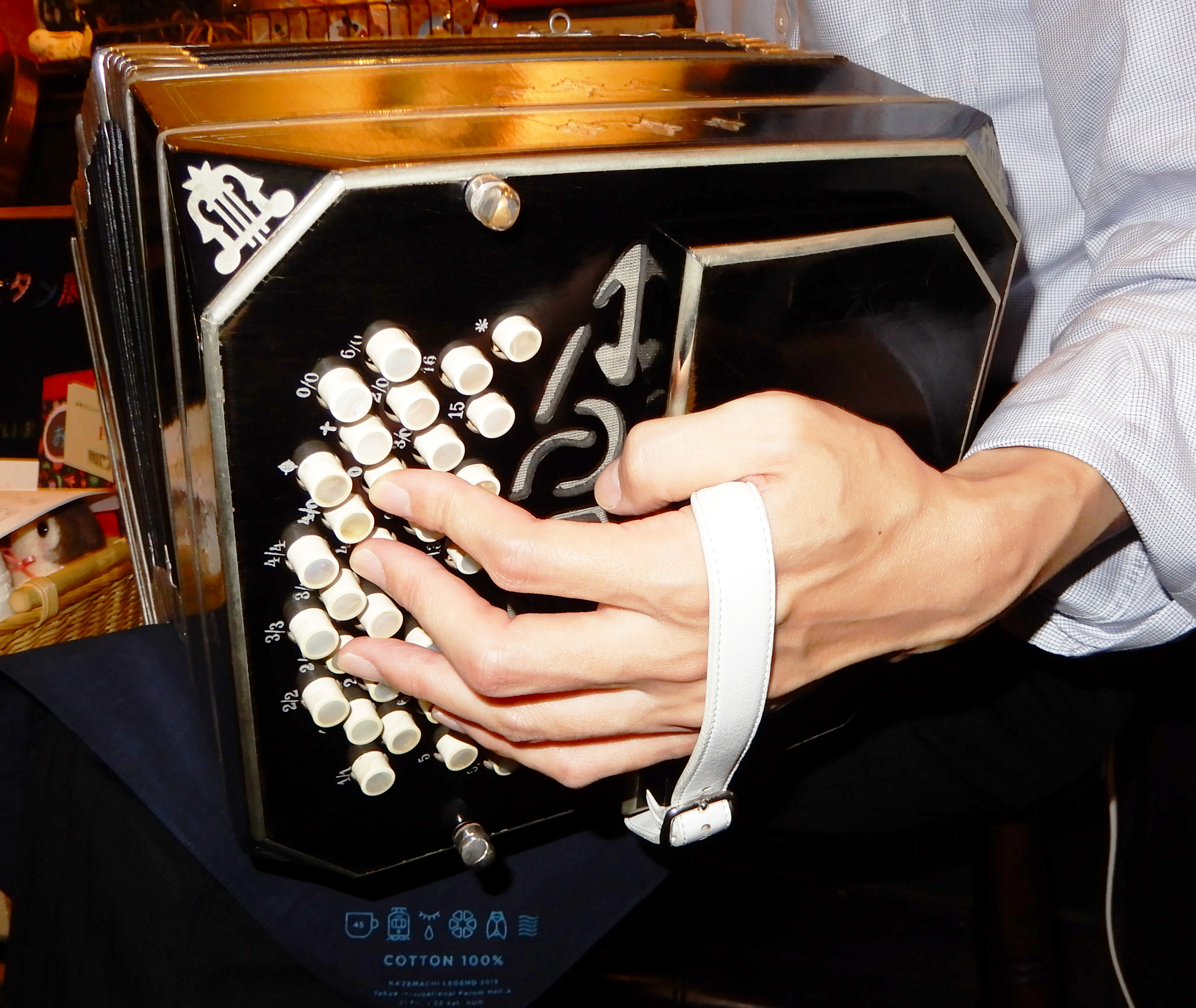
Left. Note that each button has its number or symbol

A look inside a bandoneon:

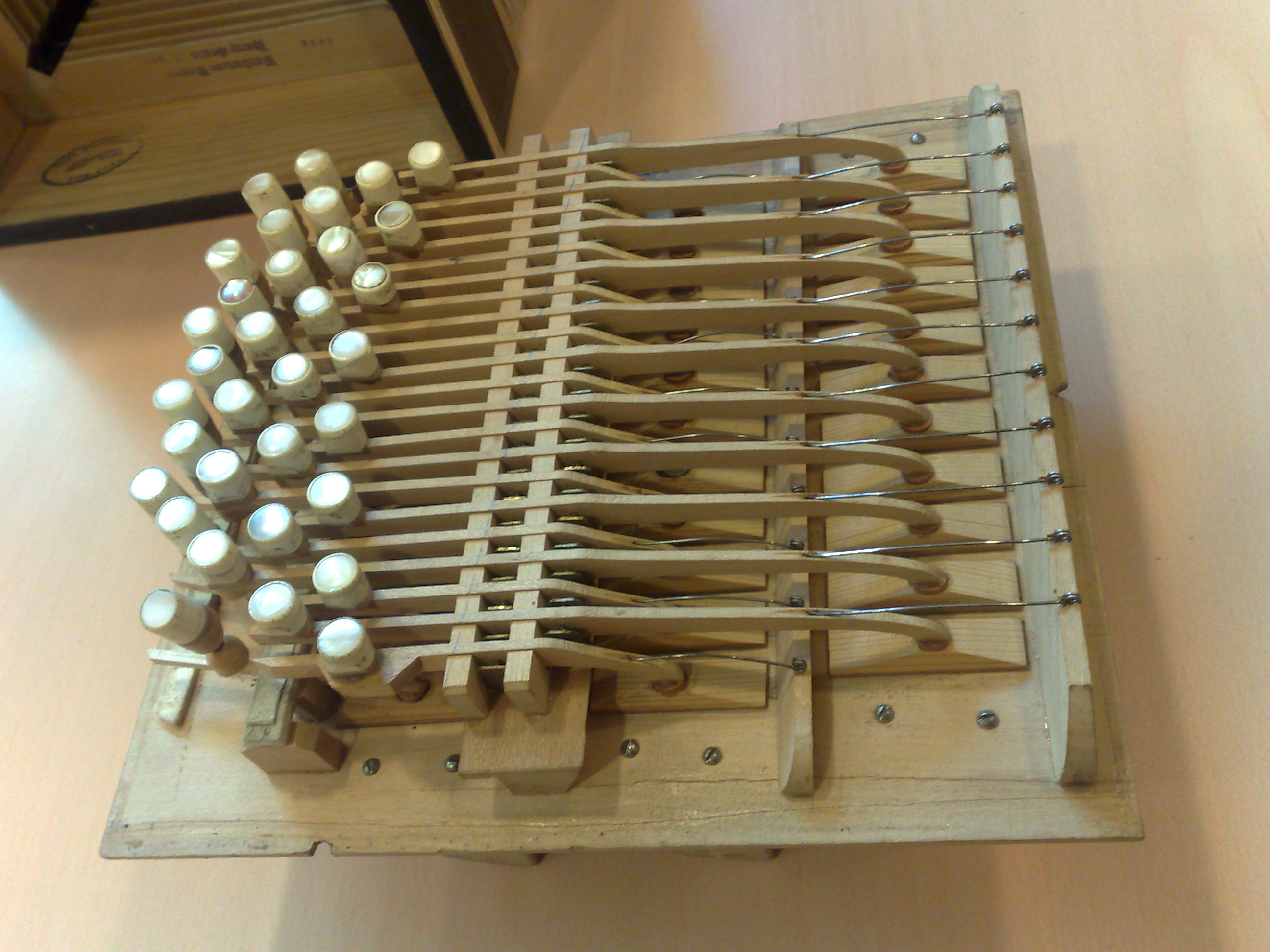

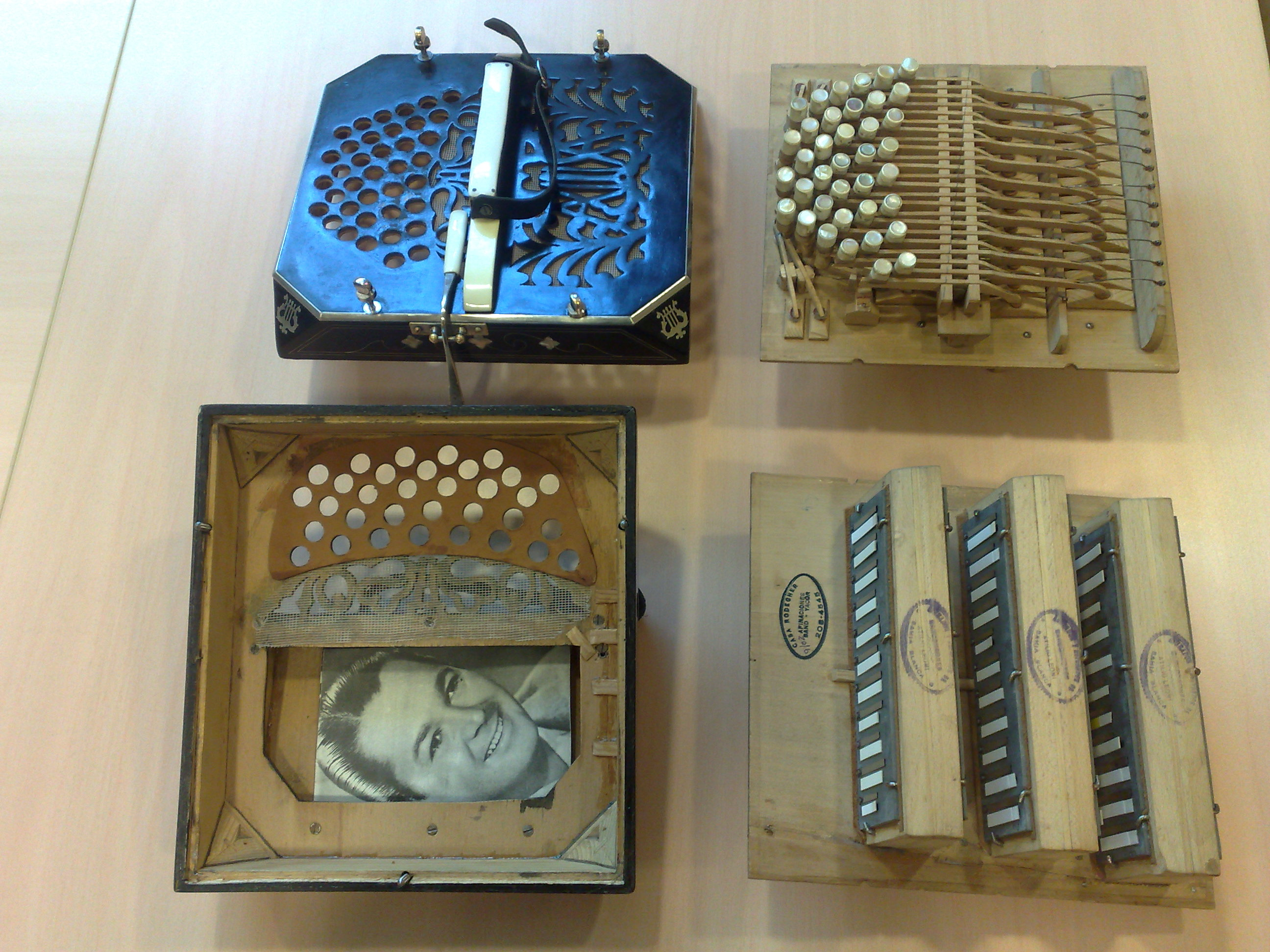

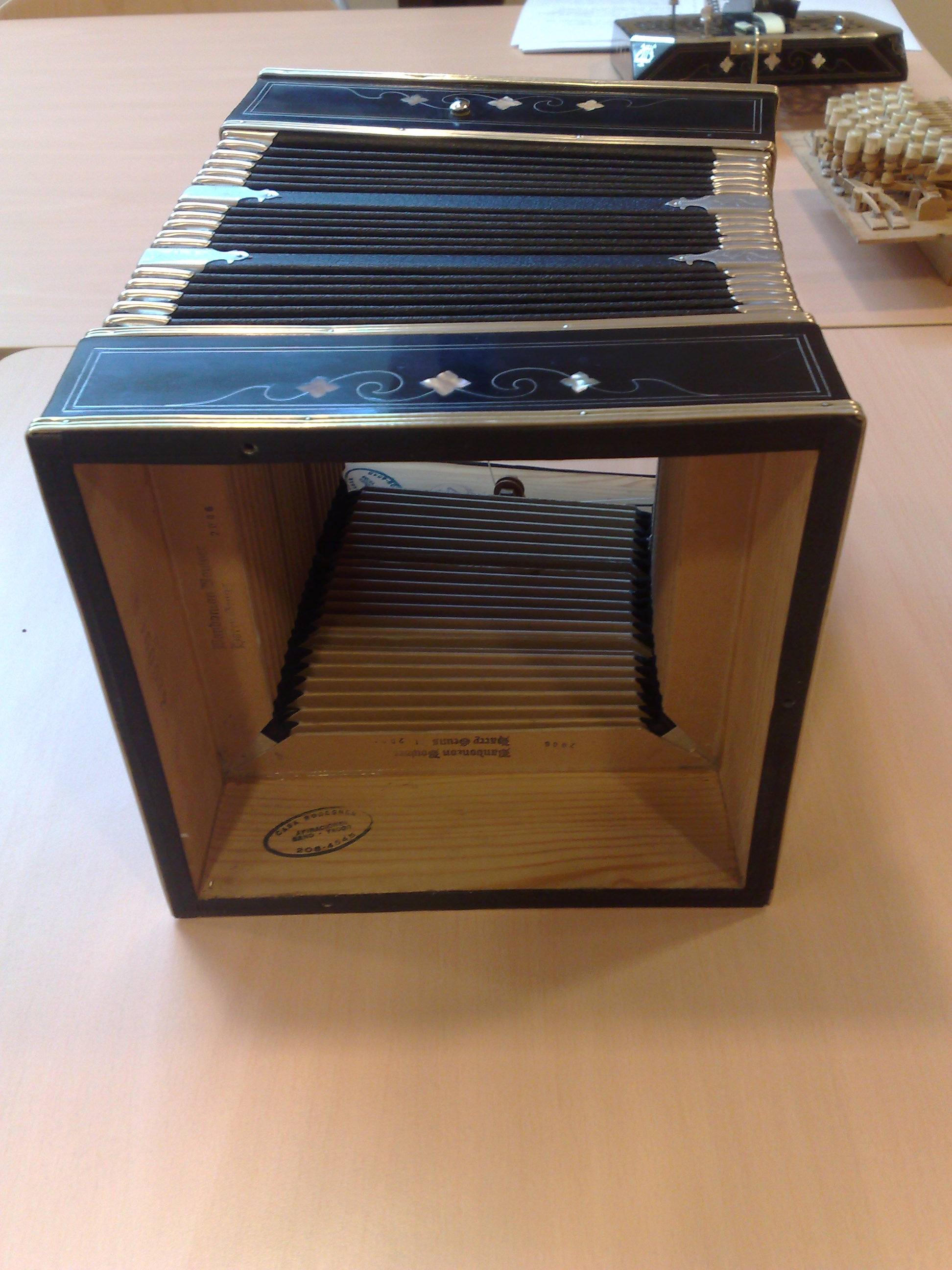

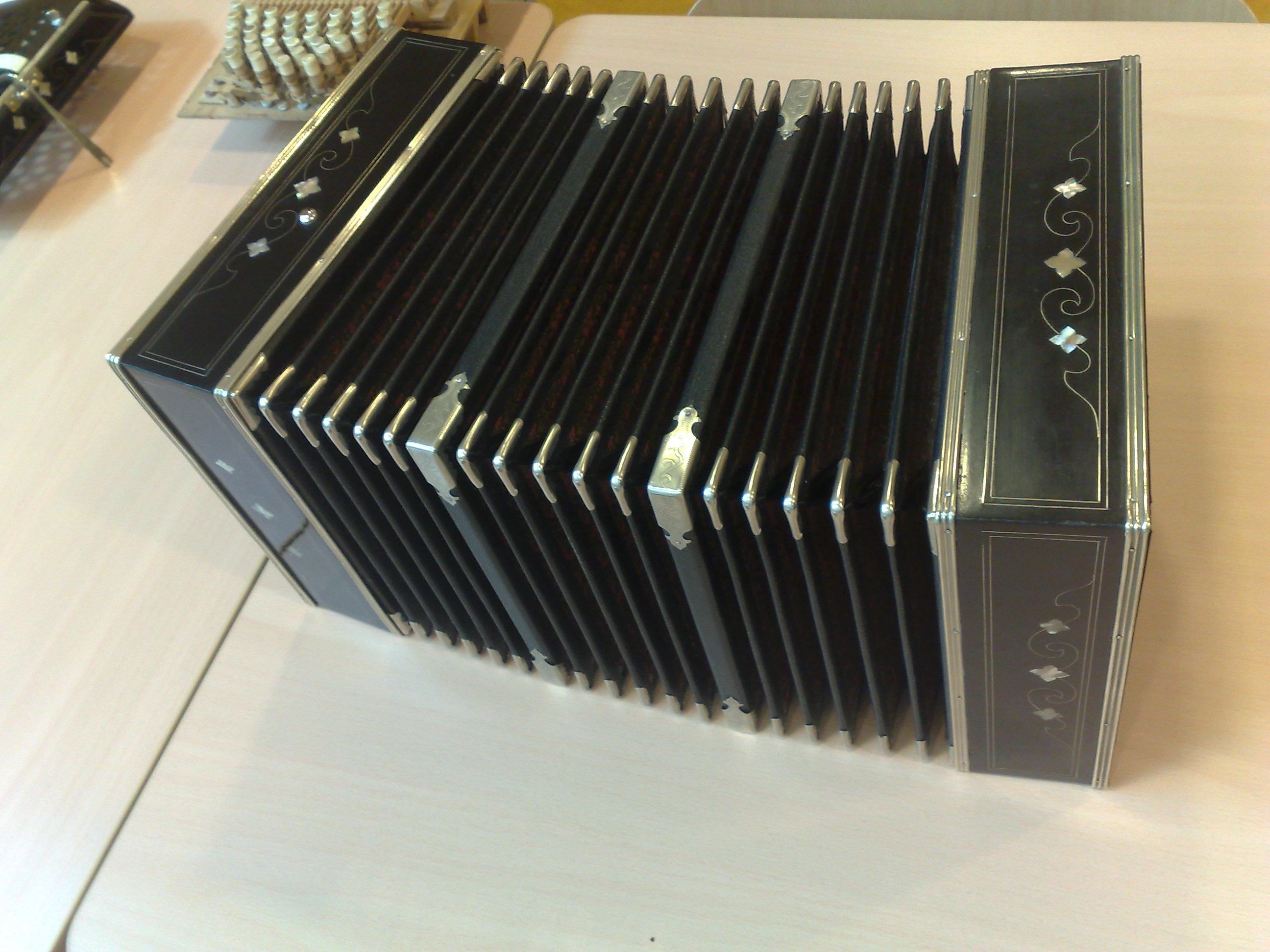

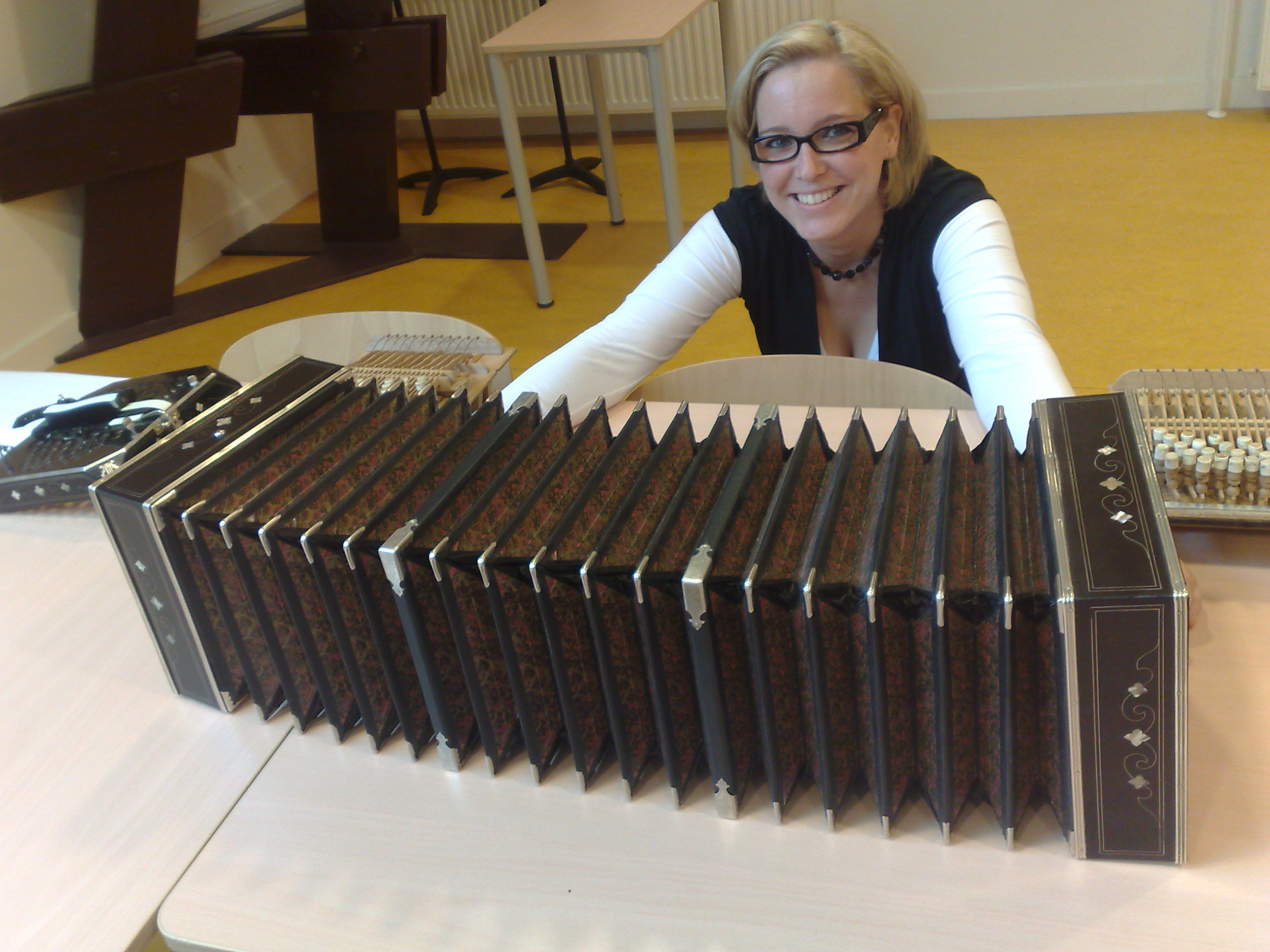

== Bandoneon-like instruments ==
Although these squeezeboxes are similar in appearance, they are not bandoneons.

Chemnitzer concertina:

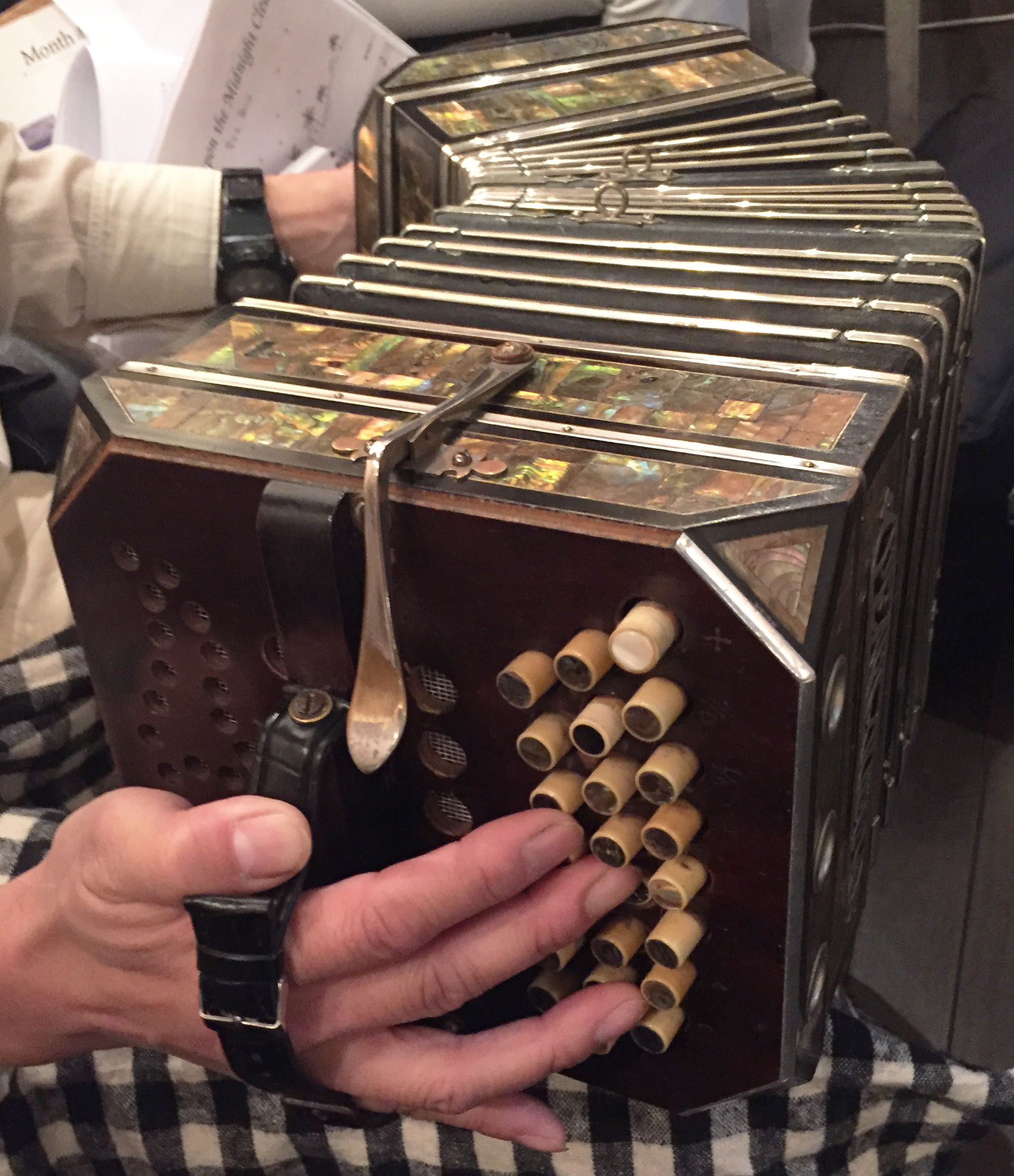
Chemnitzer concertina made in 1926

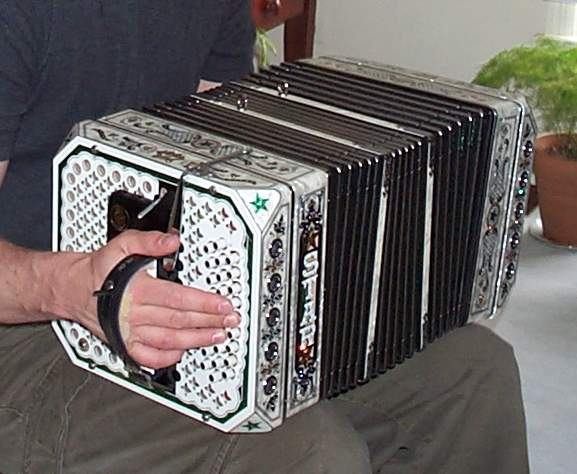
Chemnitzer concertina made in 2000

Chromatiphon:

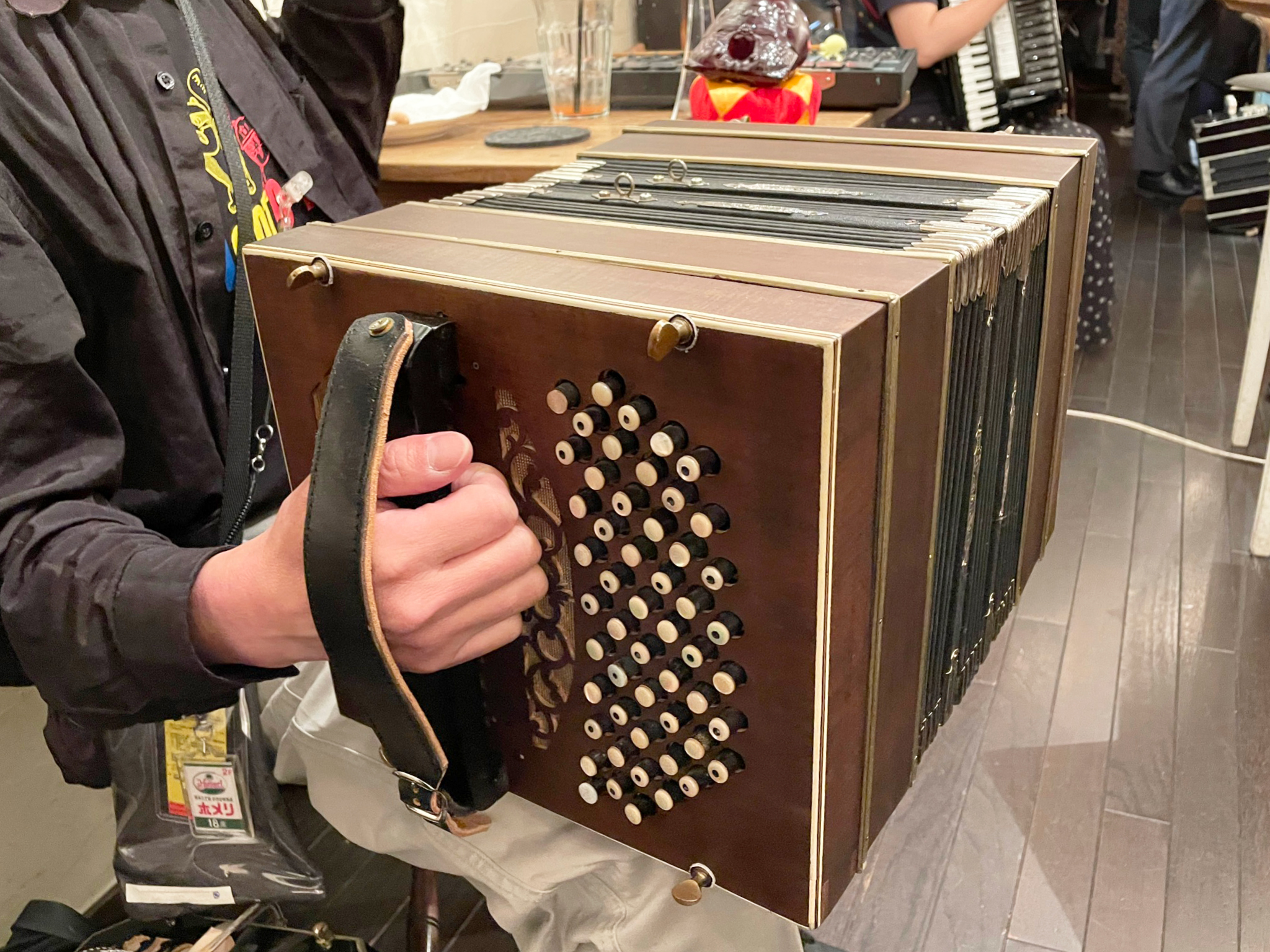

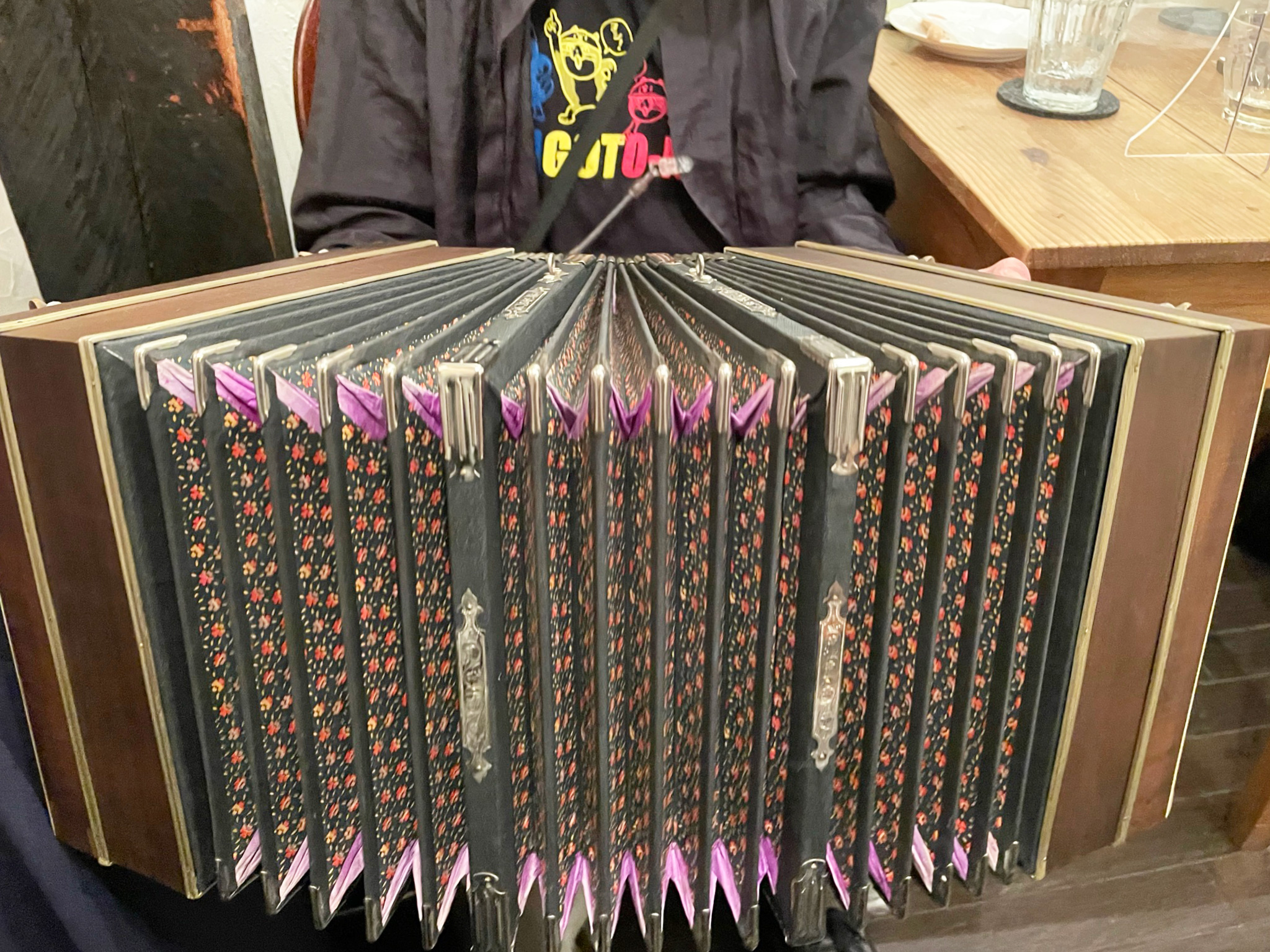

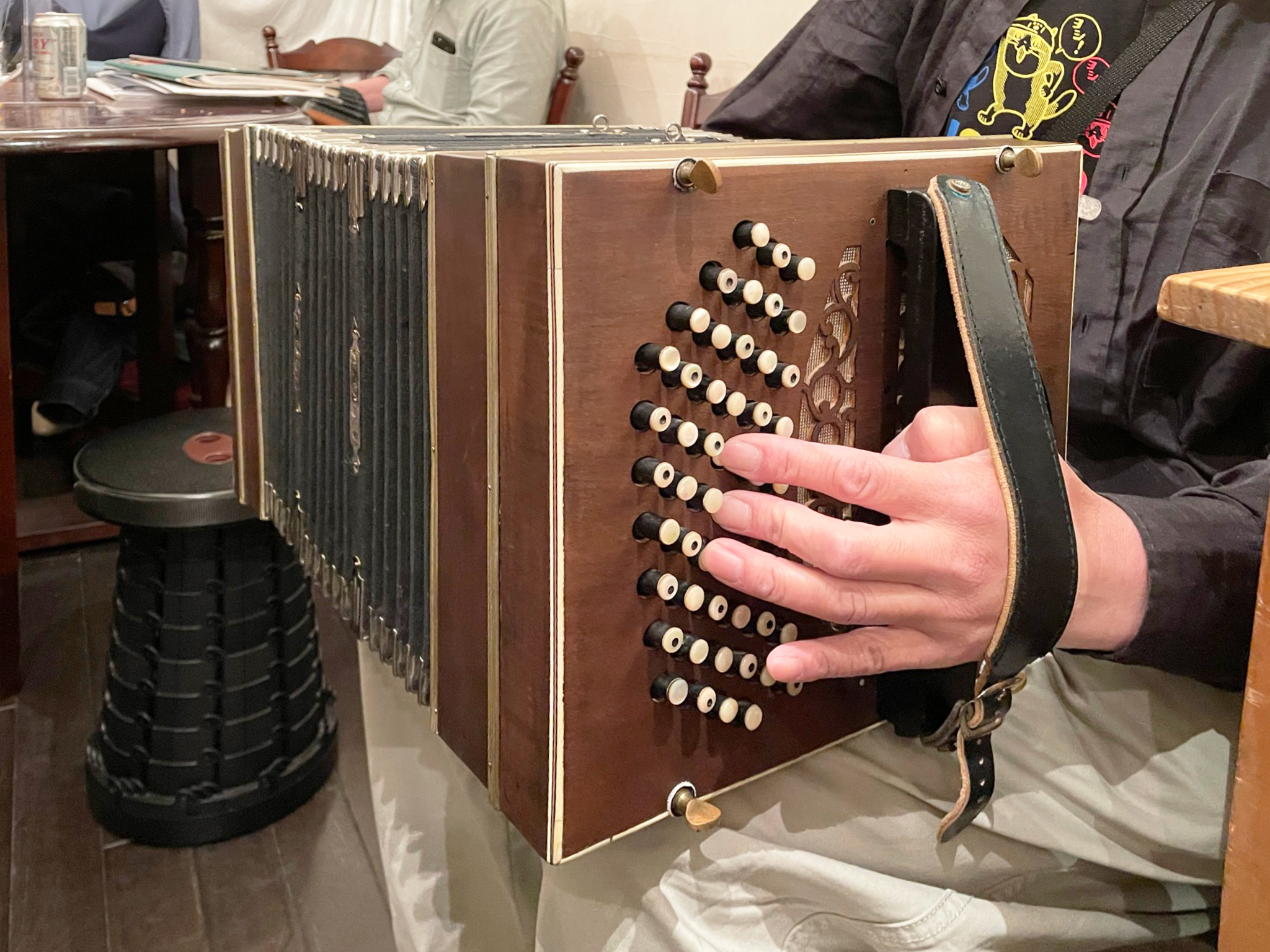

BandoMIneDonI (purely electric instrument with a MIDI attachment):

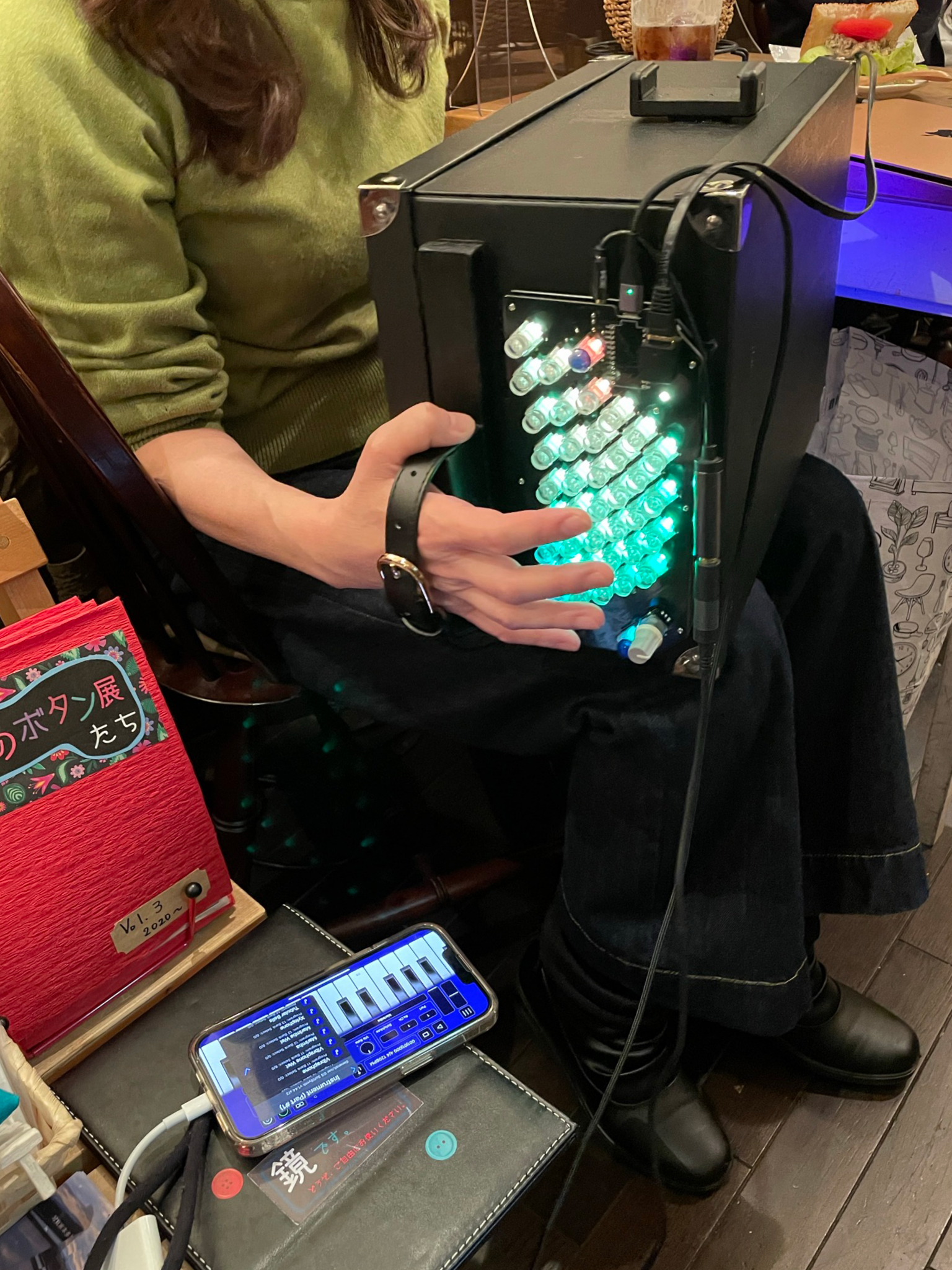

== See also ==
- The New Guard (the history of tango)
