= Francisco Canaro =

Uruguayan violinist (1888–1964)

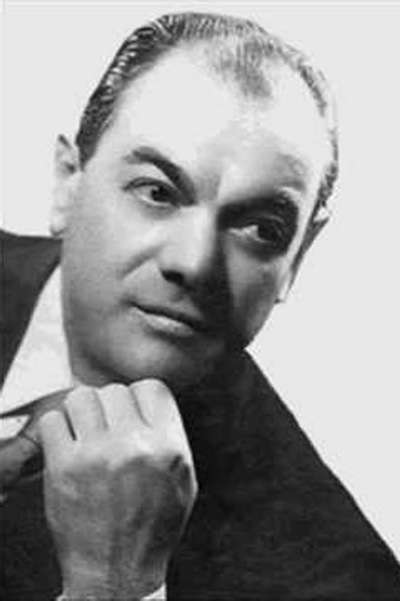
- Portrait of Canaro, c. 1940.

Background information
- Born: Francisco Canarozzo; November 26, 1888; San José de Mayo, Uruguay
- Died: December 14, 1964 (aged 76) Argentina
- Genres: Tango
- Occupations: Musician, orchestra leader
- Instrument: Violin

Francisco Canaro, also known by the nickname Pirincho, (November 26, 1888 – December 14, 1964) was a Uruguayan violinist and tango orchestra leader.

Canaro was born in San José de Mayo, Uruguay, in 1888. His parents were Italian immigrants, and later, when he was less than 10 years old, they emigrated to Buenos Aires, Argentina in the late nineteenth century. As a young man he found work in a factory, where an empty oil can, in his skilled hands, became his first violin. Performing in seedy bars initially, he ultimately forged a career that spanned many decades, and his orchestra was one of the most recorded. His introduction to the tango came by orquesta típica leader Vicente Greco in 1908, and in 1912 he composed "Pinta brava" ("Fierce Look"). Canaro composed the music for the 1915 Argentine classic film Nobleza gaucha. He later was romantically attached to Argentine actress and tango vocalist Ada Falcón, but the relationship, which began in the early 1920s, grew apart a decade later.

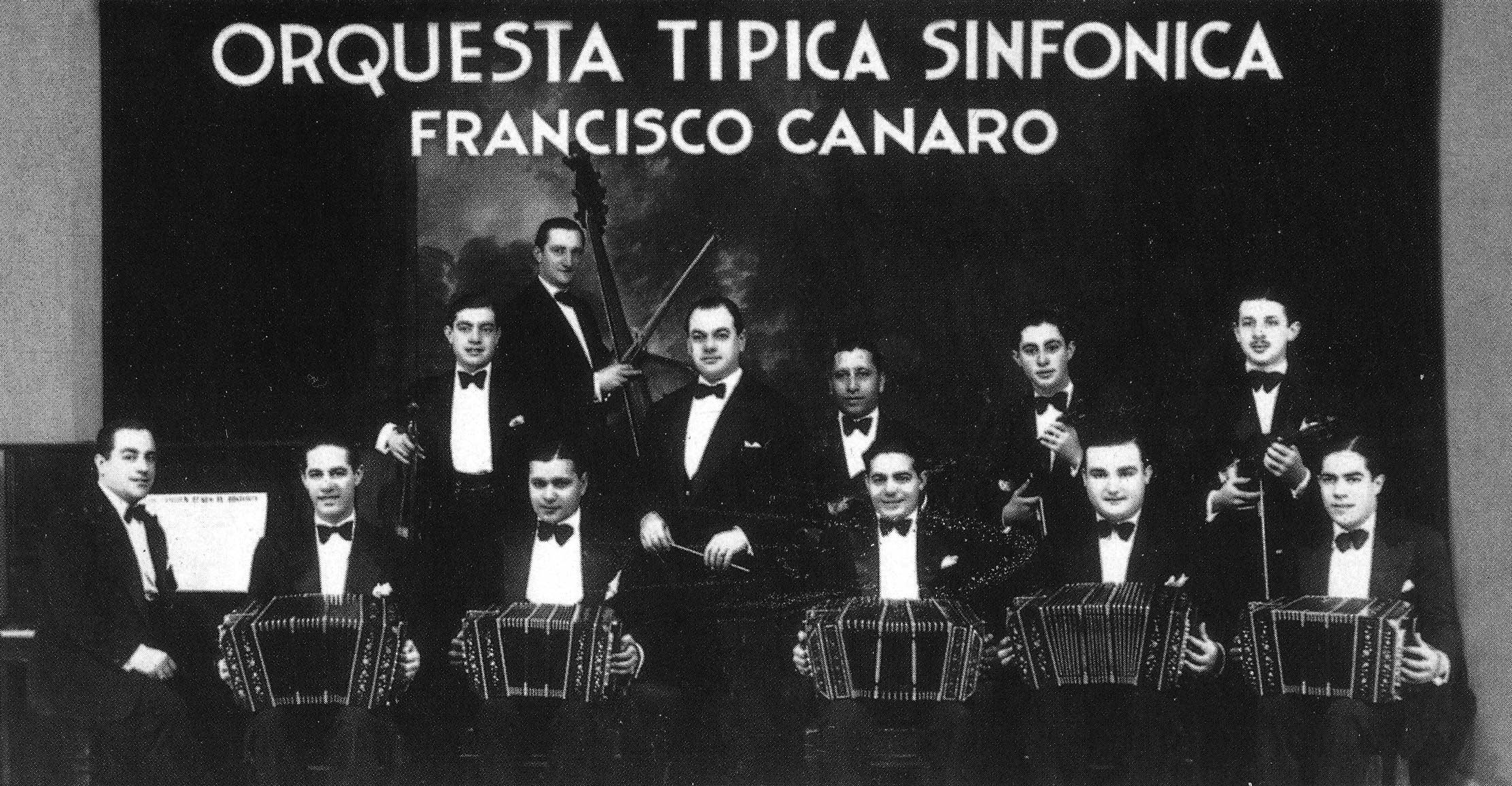
Canaro and his orchestra, c.1930.

In 1920 Canaro discovered Azucena Maizani, who rapidly developed into a major tango star.

Canaro was active in the cause of intellectual property rights from 1918 onwards, and was instrumental in the establishment of the Argentine Society of Composers and Songwriters (SADAIC), in 1935, purchasing the downtown Buenos Aires lot where its headquarters were built. He performed in Paris with his orchestra in 1925, and a success among local audiences, he remained in Europe for a decade. Becoming a naturalized Argentine citizen in 1940, much of his recorded music is in the classic salon style of that decade, but he is also considered a member of the old guard, and some of his later recordings contributed to the transition to concert tango.

Canaro's orchestra became a fixture on Argentine radio during the 1940s and early 1950s, though for many contemporary dancers and listeners, his early golden age recordings remained the best in their genre. Canaro authored his memoirs, Mis 50 años con el tango (My Fifty Years with the Tango) in 1956, but later developed Paget's disease, and was forced to retire. He died in Buenos Aires in 1964.

The TANGO-DJ.AT Database lists more than 12,400 different transfers of recordings by Canaro from 78-rpm discs, LPs, CDs and digital sources.

== Selected filmography ==
- New Port (1936)
- The Song of the Suburbs (1941)

== Bibliography ==
- Karush, Matthew B. Culture of Class: Radio and Cinema in the Making of a Divided Argentina, 1920–1946. Duke University Press, 2012.
