= Alcides Rossi =

- Born: January 1, 1927 (age 98); Bernal, Buenos Aires Province, Argentina
- Origin: Argentina
- Genres: Tango
- Occupation: Double bassist
- Instrument: Double bass
- Years active: 1940s–present

Alcides Rossi (1 January 1927) is an Argentine double bass player, known for his involvement in notable tango orchestras.

== Life ==
Alcides Rossi was born into a family of musicians: his father was the renowned double bass player Aniceto Rossi, and he received his first double bass lessons from him, as well as from other members of his family.

=== Professional career ===
He made his professional debut in Cristóbal Herreros' orchestra and later joined ensembles led by Alfredo Gobbi, Florindo Sassone, José Basso, and Alberto Morán (under the musical direction of Armando Cupo). He also accompanied Nelly Omar in performances on Radio El Mundo.

He was later invited by Aníbal Troilo to replace the double bass player Kicho Díaz. During this period, he was part of the trio Los Modernos, along with Osvaldo Berlingieri and Alberto García, recording with the singer Roberto Goyeneche.

=== Osvaldo Pugliese's orchestra ===
In 1960, after his father's retirement, Alcides was invited by Osvaldo Pugliese to join his orchestra. He made his debut in the city of Rosario. He contributed to a distinctive style within the ensemble, characterized by strict rhythm, bow strikes against the body of the double bass, and solo passages. He recorded tangos such as Canaro en París (1965), La mariposa(1966), and Bandoneón arrabalero.

=== Sexteto Tango ===
In March 1968, together with Osvaldo Ruggiero, Julián Plaza, Víctor Lavallén, Oscar Herrero, Emilio Balcarce, and singer Jorge Maciel, he founded the Sexteto Tango. The group aimed to continue Pugliese's style in a smaller ensemble format. They went on international tours, recorded several LPs for RCA Victor, and their activity came to an end with the passing of several members.

== Later career ==
During the 1990s, he was invited by Luis Stazo and José Libertella for a European tour with the Sexteto Mayor. He also took part in projects led by Julián Plaza and Víctor Lavallén, and joined the Tango School Orchestra as a guest instructor.

In 2007, The Argentine Tango Society premiered a documentary titled Alcides y Aniceto. Los Rossi, un siglo de Tango, dedicated to the lives of Alcides Rossi and his father.
