= Oscar Herrero (violinist) =

- Born: Oscar Luis Herrero; 4 July 1921; Buenos Aires, Argentina
- Origin: Argentina
- Died: 23 February 1999 (aged 77) Buenos Aires, Argentina
- Genre: Tango
- Occupations: Composer, arranger, violinist

Oscar Herrero (5 July 1921 – 23 February 1999), whose full name was Oscar Luis Herrero and who was nicknamed Cacho, was an Argentine arranger, composer, and violinist dedicated to the tango genre. He had a long career with Osvaldo Pugliese's orchestra and was a founding member of the Sexteto Tango.

== Professional career ==
=== Early years ===
He was born in the Palermo neighborhood, and it was his musician father who gave him his first music lessons. From his two brothers—one a violinist and the other a bandoneonist—he learned to play both instruments, eventually choosing the violin and refining his skills under the distinguished violinist from Rosario, Emilio Cantore. At the age of sixteen, he made his debut in the orchestra led by the Herrero brothers, which performed at local venues and neighborhood parties. Shortly afterward, he formed the Catano-Herrero Quintet.

He later joined a quartet with three musicians organized by pianist Armando Cupo, and in 1940 he began working in Pedro Maffia’s orchestra. In 1941, he was hired by the ensemble led by Uruguayan Romeo Gentile, with whom he performed on LR2 Radio Argentina. In 1942, he joined Emilio Orlando’s orchestra, which gave him the opportunity to participate in Ronda de ases, a successful program broadcast twice a week featuring four orchestras. It was initially transmitted from the studios of Radio El Mundo and later from the Teatro Casino on Maipú Street, across from the Marabú cabaret. During its run, the program was also known by the names Esquinas de mi ciudad and Casino, without changing its format or quality.

=== With Osvaldo Pugliese ===
At the end of 1943, Alfredo Gobbi offered him a place in the orchestra he directed, but just as he was about to accept, he received another offer—through Enrique Camerano, the first violinist of Osvaldo Pugliese’s orchestra—to become the second violinist in the string section, which also included Julio Carrasco and Jaime Tursky. Herrero's decision to accept Pugliese's offer instead angered Gobbi, and their reconciliation came only many years later. During the 25 years he spent with Pugliese, the string section he worked with included, in addition to Camerano and Carrasco, Emilio Balcarce (who replaced Tursky), Francisco Sammartino (viola), and Aniceto Rossi (double bass).

In 1958, after Camerano left, Pugliese appointed Herrero as first violin and added the cello to the orchestra to reinforce the lower range of the string section. In 1965, when maestro Osvaldo Pugliese returned from an extensive tour of Japan with his orchestra, he proposed the idea of forming a sextet in the style of Julio De Caro, believing that reducing the ensemble size was a way to confront the crisis tango was experiencing at the time. However, he ultimately did not implement this change.

=== With Sexteto Tango ===
In 1966, Pugliese's orchestra had to suspend its activities due to the conductor's illness. During that time, bandoneonists Osvaldo Ruggiero and Víctor Lavallén, violinists Emilio Balcarce and Oscar Herrero, pianist Julián Plaza, double bassist Alcides Rossi, and singer Jorge Maciel formed the Sexteto Tango in October 1968. They made their debut at Caño 14, one of the most prominent tango venues of the time. Shortly afterward, when Pugliese returned to activity, the members performed in both groups before eventually parting ways amicably. A few months later, they recorded their first LP titled Presentación del Sexteto Tango for the RCA Víctor label, which included pieces such as Quejas de bandoneón, Amurado, La bordona, and Danzarín.

The group performed on television, toured internationally, gave concerts at the Teatro Colón in Buenos Aires, and recorded eleven LPs—ten with the RCA Victor label and one produced in Japan for Columbia Records. Starting in the 1970s, Sexteto Tango came to be regarded as one of the most representative tango ensembles of the genre. It was organized in the style of traditional sextets but with a forward-thinking approach that still respected the essence of tango. Its members were talented and prestigious musicians, but the group was more than just the sum of its parts. Their style preserved the core structure of Pugliese's sound, yet it was not a mere copy or imitation. They achieved a unique sound that became a reference point for many other ensembles that followed—and in some cases, imitated—it.

They were praised by critics of their time, who recognized their achievement in attempting to forge a difficult synthesis between the avant-garde and tradition—avoiding both the temptation to imitate the creator of La yumba and the lure of engaging in certain avant-garde experiments. They developed a style of their own, a feat in which exceptional musicians like Emilio Balcarce and Julián Plaza played a significant role. Their performances continued until 1991, and in that year, Oscar Herrero retired from musical activity.

Oscar Herrero died in Buenos Aires on February 23, 1999.

=== As a composer ===
Among his musical works, the instrumental tangos Nochero soy (1956) and Quejumbroso (1959) stand out as highly representative pieces of modern tango composition. He also collaborated with the poet Elizardo Martínez Vilas, who used the pseudonym "Marvil," on several tangos that were all recorded by Pugliese's orchestra with the voice of Alberto Morán: Descorazonado, El mate amargo, and Porque no te tengo más. With Pugliese's orchestra, Herrero appeared in the film Mis cinco hijos (1948), and with the Sexteto Tango in Solamente ella (1975).
