= List of tango singers =

This is a list of notable tango singers, that is, notable singers who are accomplished in the tango genre. Many tango musicians have been both musicians and singers, but this does not exclude from this list. While the vast majority of earlier tango singers were Argentines, this list illustrates the diversification of tango over time, with the growth in female stars such as Susana Rinaldi and the spread of tango around the world, as far as Russia (Pyotr Leshchenko), Poland (Jerzy Petersburski), and Turkey (İbrahim Özgür).

== A ==
- Carlos Acuña^{[TT]} ^{[ti]} (1915–1999) known for his deep, high and expressive voice. His foreign travels brought him success in Uruguay, Mexico, Italy and Spain, where he became a close friend of the exiled Juan Perón.
- Alberto Arenas^{[ti]} ^{[TT]}
- Imperio Argentina^{[TT]}

== B ==
- Amelita Baltar^{[TT]}
- Alfredo Belusi^{[ti]} ^{[TT]}
- Beba Bidart^{[TT]}
- Eladia Blázquez^{[ti]}
- Sofía Bozán^{[TT]}

== C ==
- Enrique Campos^{[ti]} ^{[TT]}
- Luis Cardei^{[TT]}
- Alberto Castillo^{[ti]} ^{[TT]}
- Pascual Contursi^{[ti]}
- Ignacio Corsini^{[ti]} ^{[TT]}

== D ==
- María de la Fuente^{[ti]} ^{[TT]}
- Hugo del Carril^{[ti]} ^{[TT]}
- Ángel Díaz (singer)^{[ti]} ^{[TT]}
- Fernando Díaz^{[ti]} ^{[TT]}
- Patrocinio Díaz
- Roberto Díaz^{[ti]} ^{[TT]}

== E ==
- Eduardo Espinoza^{[TT]}
- Gabino Ezeiza^{[TT]}

== F ==
- Néstor Fabián^{[TT]}
- Ada Falcón^{[ti]} ^{[TT]}
- Roberto Flores^{[ti]} ^{[TT]}
- Roberto Fugazot^{[TT]}

== G ==
- Carlos Gardel^{[ti]}
- Roberto Goyeneche^{[ti]} ^{[TT]}
- Graciela Susana^{[TT]}

== I ==
- Agustín Irusta^{[TT]}

== J ==
- Rubén Juárez^{[TT]}

== L ==
- Libertad Lamarque^{[ti]} ^{[TT]}
- Juanita Larrauri^{[TT]}
- Raúl Lavié^{[TT]}
- Amanda Ledesma^{[TT]}
- Pyotr Leshchenko (1898–1954), the "King of Russian Tango" enjoyed great popularity both in Russia and abroad despite being suppressed in the Soviet Union. He sang mainly in Russian, also singing gypsy music. He died in a prison camp near Bucharest.
- Claudia Levy^{[TT]}
- Mario Luna^{[TT]}
- Virginia Luque^{[TT]}

== M ==
- Agustín Magaldi^{[ti]} ^{[TT]}
- Azucena Maizani^{[ti]} ^{[TT]}
- Tita Merello^{[TT]}
- Nina Miranda^{[ti]} ^{[TT]}
- Miguel Montero^{[ti]} ^{[TT]}
- Alberto Morán^{[ti]} ^{[TT]}
- Daniel Melingo

== O ==
- Sabina Olmos^{[TT]}
- Nelly Omar^{[ti]} ^{[TT]}
- İbrahim Özgür (1905–1959), dubbed "The King of Turkish Tango" for his singing and composition, after an earlier successful career in jazz. He began tango recordings in 1938. His nostalgic, "velvet" voice was well-suited for his mournful songs, haunted by his unrequited love for an Indian princess he met during his grand tour of Asia in the 1930s. His most famous such song, Mavi Kelebek ("Blue Butterfly"), won him a legion of female fans. Özgür was the first male tango singer to rise to prominence in Turkey, where the tango tradition had been dominated by women.

== P ==
- Anita Palmero^{[TT]}
- Jerzy Petersburski

== Q ==
- Rosita Quiroga^{[ti]} ^{[TT]}

== R ==
- José Razzano^{[TT]}
- Susana Rinaldi^{[TT]} (born 1935), known as "la passionaria du tango", is also an actress. To avoid military rule, she settled in France where she has enjoyed a successful career. A UNESCO Goodwill Ambassador and social justice campaigner, she has been active in the artists' rights movement.
- Marcela Ríos^{[TT]}
- Edmundo Rivero^{[ti]} ^{[TT]}

== S ==
- Mercedes Simone^{[ti]} ^{[TT]}
- Alba Solís^{[TT]}
- Julio Sosa^{[ti]} ^{[TT]} (1926–1964), from Uruguay; was one of the most important tango singers during tango's unhappy years in the 1950s and early 1960s. His passion for poetry led to his sole published book; his passion for fast cars led to his young death.
- Hrysoula Stefanaki^{[TT]} popular Greek singer / vocalist, and musician, born in Heraklion, Crete, Greece, best known for her outstanding & unique performances on national & international retro songs such as "Tango Noturno", "Blue Haven", "The last waltz", "Regretting for wasted years"etc.

== T ==
- Tania^{[TT]}
- Juan Carlos Thorry^{[TT]}

== V ==
- Jorge Valdez^{[ti]} ^{[TT]}
- Adriana Varela^{[TT]}
- Virginia Vera^{[TT]}
- Carlos Vidal^{[TT]}
- Ángel Villoldo^{[TT]}
- Olavi Virta Finland.
- Erika Vikman (early)

== Z ==
- Julia Zenko^{[TT]}

== Source lists ==
ti This person appears on this list of notable tango singers, tango.info (URL accessed 2006-09-19).

TT This person appears in todotango.com (URL accessed 12 July 2006).
