= Julián Plaza =

- Born: Julián Plaza; 9 July 1928; General Manuel Campos, La Pampa Province, Argentina
- Origin: Argentina
- Died: 19 April 2003 (aged 74)
- Occupations: Composer, conductor, pianist, bandoneonist, arranger
- Instruments: Piano, bandoneon

Julián Plaza (9 July 1928 – 19 April 2003) was an Argentine musician who dedicated himself to the tango genre as a composer, orchestra conductor, pianist, bandoneonist, and arranger.

== Life ==
=== Early years ===
He learned music from his father, who played the bandoneon thanks to a correspondence course. At the age of 11, when the family moved to Buenos Aires, he began studying with Félix Lipesker, and by joining children's orchestras, he gradually learned the art of ensemble playing.

=== Professional career ===
He made his debut as a bandoneonist in Edgardo Donato's orchestra in Buenos Aires at the age of 15. Later on, he played with Antonio Rodio's orchestra, took part in a tour with Eduardo Bianco through European and Middle Eastern countries, and joined Miguel Caló's ensemble in 1949. At the same time, he formed an a cappella bandoneon quartet with Alfredo Marcucci, Ernesto Franco, and Atilio Corral.

In 1959, he joined Osvaldo Pugliese’s orchestra as a bandoneonist. With this ensemble, he took part that year in an extensive tour of Russia and China. He remained with the orchestra for 10 years and later left with other members to found the Sexteto Tango, formed alongside Osvaldo Ruggiero and Víctor Lavallén (bandoneons), Emilio Balcarce and Oscar Herrero (violins), and Alcides Rossi (double bass).

Since the new group already had two bandoneonists, he took on the role of pianist, as he also mastered that instrument. With this ensemble, whose music bore the hallmark of Pugliese, they recorded under the RCA Victor label. The Sexteto Tango began a long career, but Plaza left the group in 1992 to form and lead his own ensemble.

He was an executive at SADAIC and received the ACE Gold Award in 1997.

Plaza died in Buenos Aires on April 19, 2003.

== As an arranger ==
After the composer but before the performer comes the arranger, who adds their own personal touch to the piece before it is performed, and in that role Plaza had particular significance. At the beginning of his career in the 1950s, Plaza recalled observing the clarity of the arrangements made by Héctor Stamponi and Astor Piazzolla. He wrote his first arrangement—the milonga Dominguera— for Miguel Caló in 1950.

Plaza had the ability to adapt, in his role as arranger, to the styles of orchestras as different as those of Aníbal Troilo and Pugliese. For Troilo, he arranged, among others, eight of his own compositions. His version of La mariposa (by Pedro Maffia) for Pugliese's orchestra is a clear example of how an arrangement can bring a tango to life. In it, the typical Yumba rhythm appears, along with sharply articulated staccato phrases and sudden changes in dynamics and orchestration, which later became the distinctive hallmark of the Sexteto Tango. In fact, Plaza's arrangements are essential to many of the pieces recorded on Aníbal Troilo for Export, released by RCA, and in the Osvaldo Pugliese Collection from EMI.

Other works of his were for Atilio Stampone, Leopoldo Federico, Osvaldo Piro, José Colángelo, and extensively for the Sexteto Tango. He also created standard arrangements for Editorial Korn.

== As a composer ==
Plaza's composed tangos and milongas. Some of his works are Danzarín, Sensiblero, Melancólico, Nostálgico, and Disonante, which showcase an unmistakable stylistic signature. Plaza also contributed to the enrichment of the milonga, through works of varying styles such as Dominguera (urban), Payadora (folk), Nocturna (urban), and Morena (milonga-candombe).

== Film ==
With his orchestra and his own arrangements, he contributed music to Argentine films such as The Truce (1974), Solamente ella (1975), Sentimental (1981), and Chau, papá (1987).

== Registered works ==
The works registered under his name at SADAIC are:

- A lo moderno
- Adiós al hermano
- Apuesto por la vida (1986), with Ismael Héctor Varela
- Buenos Aires en tango
- Buenos Aires París (1986)
- Buenos Aires Tokyo
- Color tango (1967)
- Criollito (1962)
- Cuanta angustia (1957), with Manuel Barros
- Danzarín (1958)
- Disonante (1964)
- Dominguera (1953)
- Expresivo (1973)
- Futura
- Gotán
- Instrumental (1975)
- Juguetón
- Locos de contento (1993)
- Melancólica (1962)
- Melancólico (1960)
- Milonga de marfil negro (1977) with Jorge Luis Borges
- Milongueada (1967)
- Milongueando (1967)
- Milontango (1970)
- Morena (1964)
- Nocturna o Nocturno (1969)
- Nostálgico (1962)
- Paseandera
- Payadora (1966)
- Recordando a Pichuco (1987)
- Sensiblero (1955)
- Sentimental Buenos Aires (1982)
- Solemne (1973)
- Tango setenta
- Temperamental (1973)
- Trasnoche (1969)
- La tregua
- Un domingo con Laura (1974)

== Films ==
As a performer

- Si sos brujo: una historia de tango (2005)

Music

- Gotán (short) (1965)
- The Truce (1974)
- Solamente ella (1975)
- Sentimental (1981)
- Chau, papá (1987)
