= Mario Marmo =

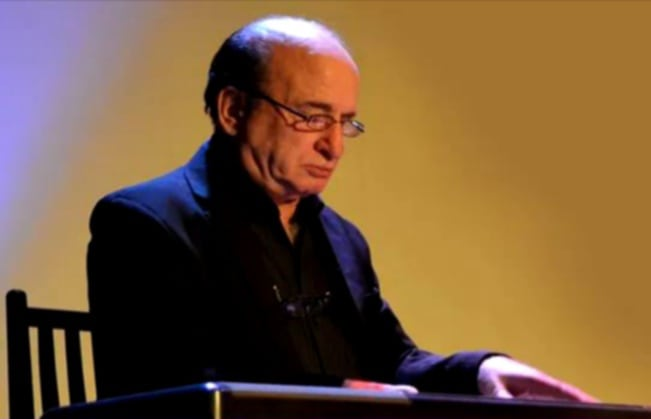
- Mario Marmo

Background information
- Born: 7 January 1940; Comodoro Rivadavia, Chubut, Argentina
- Origin: Argentina
- Died: 26 November 2016 (aged 76)
- Genres: Tango
- Occupations: Pianist, orchestral conductor, arranger, teacher
- Instrument: Piano
- Spouse: Silvia Nieves (since 1988)

Mario Marmo (7 January 1940 – 26 November 2016) was an Argentine tango pianist, orchestra conductor, and arranger. Known for his milonguero style and his work alongside renowned singers, he had a long career as an accompanist, ensemble leader, and teacher in the field of tango.

== Life ==
=== Early years ===
Mario Marmo was born on January 7, 1940, in Comodoro Rivadavia, in the province of Chubut, Argentina. The son of Gerardo José Luis Marmo and Estela María, of Italian descent, he received his first musical instruction from his brother Miguel, who taught him his first notes on the piano. He began his studies in his hometown and later moved to Buenos Aires to further his training at the Santa Catalina Institute, where he studied violin for six years and took classes with maestro Julio de Caro.

=== Professional career ===
His professional debut took place on May 24, 1955, at the "Artistic Embassy" of Club Atlético Independiente, initially as a violinist. Due to the absence of the regular pianist, director Tito Reyna placed him at the piano, marking the beginning of his career as a pianist.

Between 1958 and 1960, he was part of the typical quartet Los Cuatro Ases, directed by Rafael Roca and featuring the voice of Alberto Fontán ("Toto"). With this group, he performed during intermissions at numerous cinemas in Buenos Aires and participated in programs on Radio Mitre, Radio Belgrano, and Radio El Mundo. He also worked at the café El Olmo in Plaza Once, sharing the bill with Héctor Mauré, Julio Sosa, and Alberto Morán.

For a brief period, he replaced Lalo Benítez as the pianist in Alfredo Gobbi's orchestra during a tour of the province of Córdoba. He was also part of Juan Sánchez Gorio's orchestra for a season.

In 1960, despite being in military service, he continued performing at tango venues in Buenos Aires, such as Tango Bar (in Flores) and Café Marconi in Plaza Once. The following year, he embarked on a ninety-day tour through the south of the country with Guillermo Rico, remaining for two more years in Comodoro Rivadavia, where he performed at the most important tango venues in the region.

=== Las Estrellas del Ritmo and other projects (1964–1966) ===
Between 1964 and 1966, he formed his own group, Las Estrellas del Ritmo, which performed both tangos and tropical music. The ensemble took part in carnival celebrations in Esquel, San Antonio Oeste, Trelew, and Puerto Madryn, and performed at the cabaret in Caleta Olivia alongside maestro Ravallo, brother of the singer Estela Raval.

Later, in Buenos Aires, he accompanied choreographer and dancer Santiago Ayala ("El Chúcaro") and dancer Norma Viola. He performed at various venues, sharing the bill with Alberto Marino and Edmundo Rivero. With his ensemble, he took part in the film Un italiano en Argentina, starring Vittorio Gassman, Silvana Pampanini, and Nelly Panniza.

=== Break and return (1970–1976) ===
At the end of the 1960s, Marmo paused his musical career for approximately ten years, during which his children Mario Luis and Mónica Estela were born. In 1976, bandoneonist Enrique Miranda—who had also been part of Independiente's Artistic Embassy—invited him to take the pianist position in his new ensemble, prompting Marmo's return to the stage. That same year, Carlos Marani, owner of the Estudio Paraná rehearsal rooms, brought him on as a repertoire coach for tango singers.

=== Trío Marmo, Buenos Aires Cinco and work as arranger ===
In the 1970s, he formed the Trío Marmo and the quintet Buenos Aires Cinco, beginning his work as an arranger. With these groups—and especially through his arrangements—he showcased the milonguero qualities that defined his style, influenced by the "decareano" concept and his admiration for Aníbal Troilo and Alfredo Gobbi. He was the go-to musician for numerous singers, including Jorge Sobral, with whom he performed at the Teatro Presidente Alvear alongside Rafael Nicolau and Alberto Garralda. He also wrote special arrangements for vocal duos, trios, and quartets, carefully balancing timbres to highlight the lead voice.

=== Teaching work and later years ===
Since December 1988, he was married to the singer Silvia Nieves, who authored his biographical profile. With her, he had a daughter, Natalia Lorena. In 2013, he was still active as a teacher, with a large number of students drawn to his teaching ability, artistic honesty, and personalized dedication. Even during those years, he combined teaching with occasional performances, remaining a respected figure in the tango world.

Mario Marmo died on 26 November 2016.

== Selected discography ==
Throughout his career, Mario Marmo participated in numerous recording projects as a pianist, ensemble director, and arranger. Among the most notable titles are:

- "De igual a igual Tango" (1992), with vocals by Pablo Guzmán and ensemble directed by Mario Marmo.
- "Mi ciudad y mi gente" (date not specified), with vocals by Patricia Duarte and the Mario Marmo Trio, produced in Buenos Aires.
- "Las Perlas del Tango" (2011), an album in which he participated as director and arranger.
- "Vivamos nomás Tango" (date not specified), a project led by Mario Marmo.
