= Víctor Lavallén =

- Born: Víctor Luis Lavallén; 18 December 1935 (age 90); Rosario, Santa Fe, Argentina
- Genre: Tango
- Occupations: Bandoneonist, composer, arranger, orchestra conductor
- Instrument: Bandoneon
- Years active: 1950–present

Víctor Luis Lavallén (18 December 1935) is an Argentinian bandoneonist, orchestra conductor, composer, and tango arranger. His professional career started in the 1950s.

In November 2024, he was declared a "Distinguished Personality for Culture" by the Buenos Aires City Legislature in recognition of his substantial contribution to the development of the genre.

== Life ==
=== Early years ===
Lavallén was born on December 18, 1935, in Rosario, into a family of musicians. During his childhood, he studied trumpet, but at the age of eight, his uncle, the bandoneon player Héctor Chera, introduced him to the instrument that would define his career. At fourteen, he moved to Buenos Aires, where he debuted in a group led by Eduardo Serrano at the Picadilly theater. After a brief stint with that orchestra, he continued his training with the bandoneon player Eladio Blanco, a member of Juan D’Arienzo’s orchestra.

=== Early orchestras (1951–1958) ===
Between 1951 and 1954, he was part of Miguel Caló’s orchestra, with which he toured Brazil and participated in recordings of pieces such as "En fa menor" and "El chamuyo." During that period, he also worked with the ensembles of Ángel Domínguez, Miguel Nijensohn, Enrique Francini, Joaquín Do Reyes, and Juan José Paz, accompanying Elsa Rivas and Atilio Stampone, among others.

=== Osvaldo Pugliese Orchestra (1958–1968) ===
In 1958, he joined the legendary orchestra of Osvaldo Pugliese, where he stayed for ten years as first bandoneon, composer, and arranger. He participated in the creation and dissemination of arrangements for classic works in the Pugliese repertoire, such as "Gallo ciego" and "El pañuelito."

=== Sexteto Tango (1968–1987) ===
Alongside Osvaldo Ruggiero, Julián Plaza, Emilio Balcarce, Oscar Herrero, Alcides Rossi, and the singer Jorge Maciel, he founded the Sexteto Tango. The group, which combined tradition and innovation, remained active for nineteen years, undertaking national and international tours.

=== Later orchestras ===
After leaving the Sexteto, he was part of the Municipal Tango Orchestra of the City of Buenos Aires, under the direction of Carlos García and Raúl Garello, and of the Orquesta Color Tango. Likewise, he participated for eighteen years as musician and director in the show Forever Tango, which toured the United States and Canada.

== Discography ==
- Amanecer ciudadano (2007)
- Buenosaireando (2008)
- Atemporal (2015)
- De menor a mayor (2015)
- Comme il faut (2019), with Pablo Estigarribia and Horacio Cabarcos.
