= Osvaldo Piro =

Argentine musician (1937–2025)

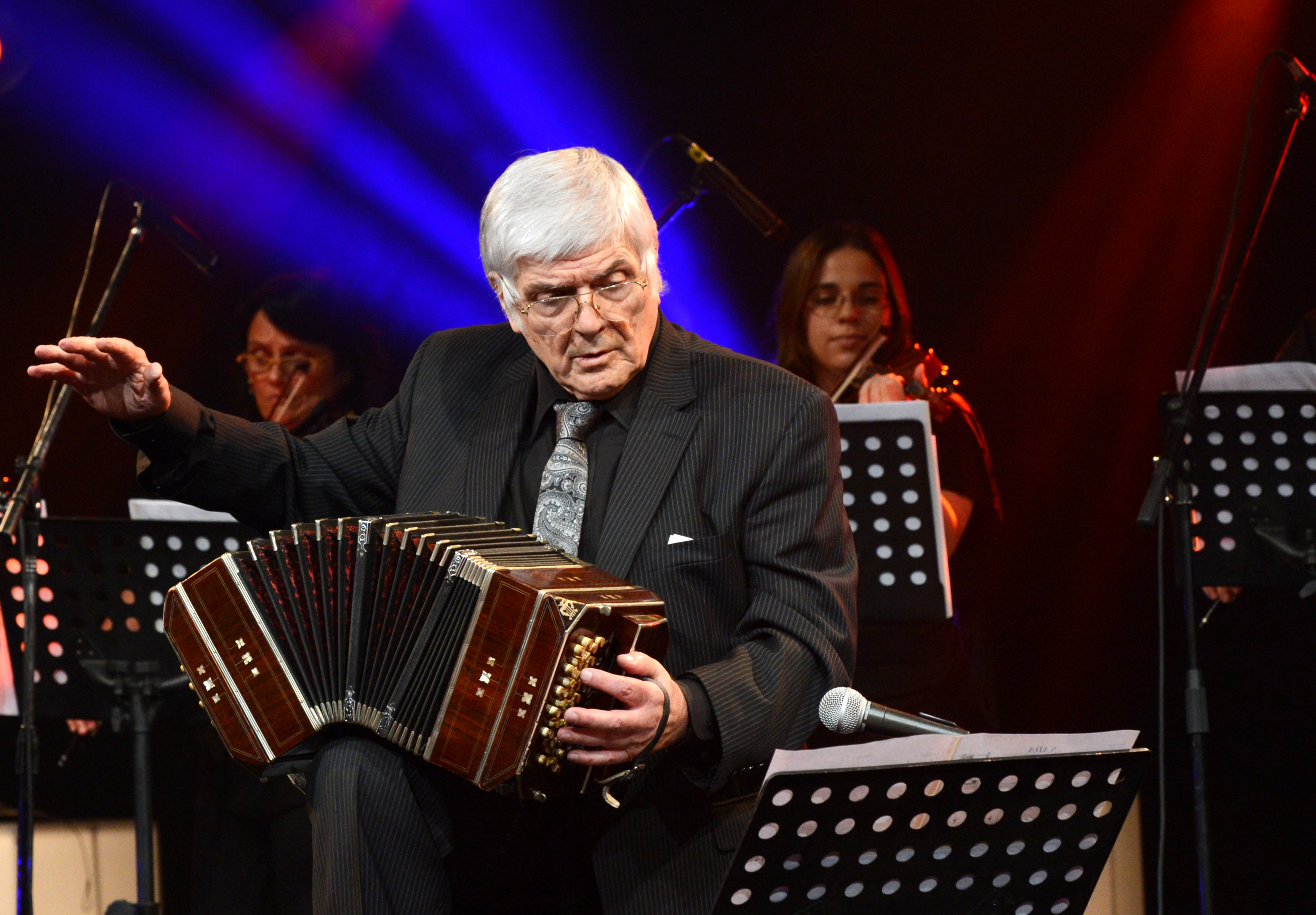
- Piro in 2014

Background information
- Birth name: Osvaldo Carlos Piro
- Born: 1 January 1937; Buenos Aires, Argentina
- Died: 7 August 2025 (aged 88)
- Genres: Tango
- Occupation(s): Bandoneonist, conductor, arranger, composer
- Instrument: Bandoneon
- Labels: Philips Records

Osvaldo Carlos Piro (Spanish: [ozˈβalðo ˈkaɾlos ˈpiɾo]; 1 January 1937 – 7 August 2025) was an Argentine bandoneonist, conductor, arranger and tango composer.

== Life and career ==
Osvaldo Piro was born in the La Paternal neighborhood of the city of Buenos Aires, on 1 January 1937. He began his bandoneon studies at the age of 10 with Félix Cordisco (uncle of bandoneon player Alfredo Cordisco, who also taught piano).

At the age of 11, he formed the children's musical trio OSMASI (Osvaldo, Mario, and Simón). At 12, he continued his studies with bandoneonist Domingo Mattio, who had been a member of Aníbal Troilo's orchestra.

He studied harmony with Pedro Rubione and Julio Nistal, and the philosophy of music with Juan Francisco Giacobbe. At the age of 15, he joined Ricardo Pedevilla's orchestra as a professional musician.

At the age of 16, he joined Alfredo Gobbi's orchestra, at a time when Jorge Maciel and Carlos Almada were the vocalists. He also belonged, for a short time and simultaneously, to the orchestras of Víctor D´Armario, with Ángel D´Angostini and Celso Amato, among others. He returned to Gobbi's orchestra, with whom he stayed for six years. Then, a year before forming his own orchestra, he joined Fulvio Salamanca’s in 1964.

He debuted with his own orchestra on 16 February 1965, at the Patio de Tango.

His orchestra was composed of:

- Osvaldo Piro (conductor and first bandoneon)
- Raúl Salvetti, Oscar Malvestitti and Alejandro Prevignano (bandoneons)
- Eduardo Salgado (soloist)
- Mario Grossi and Ricardo Buonvincino (violins)
- Néstor Panik (viola)
- Enrique Gonzalez (cello)
- Oscar Palermo (piano)
- Osvaldo Aulicino (bass)

Piro died on 7 August 2025, at the age of 88.

== Awards ==
- Palma de Oro (Festival de La Falda, Córdoba, 1965).
- Martín Fierro Award (APTRA, 1966).
- Konex Awards 1985 (Conductor of Orquesta Típica) and 1995 (Tango Ensemble).
- Distinguished Citizen of the city of Buenos Aires, 1995.
