= Sexteto Tango =

Argentine tango musical ensemble

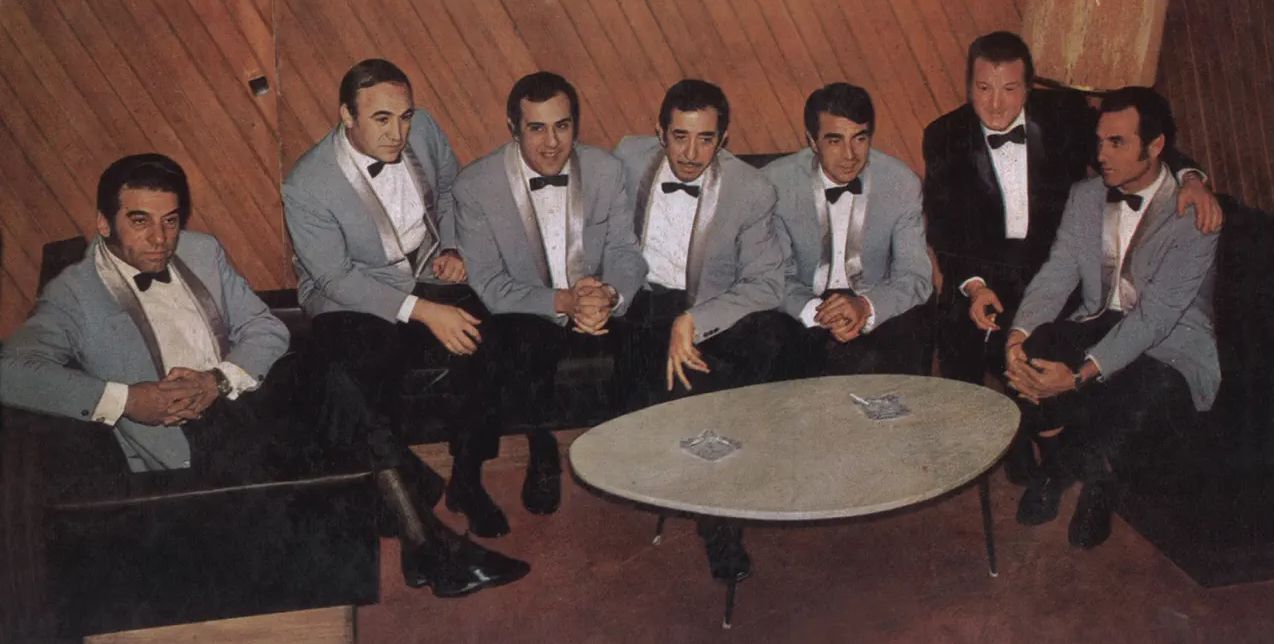
- Sexteto Tango

Background information
- Genres: Tango
- Years active: 1968–1991
- Past members: Osvaldo Ruggiero (bandoneon), Víctor Lavallén (bandoneon), Emilio Balcarce (violin), Oscar Herrero (violin), Julián Plaza (piano), Alcides Rossi (double bass), Jorge Maciel (vocals)

The Sexteto Tango was a tango musical ensemble founded in 1968 by a group of musicians from Osvaldo Pugliese's orchestra. The group had a long career until it disbanded in 1991.

== Origin ==
When Maestro Osvaldo Pugliese returned in 1965 from an extensive tour of Japan with his orchestra, he proposed the idea of forming a sextet in the style of Julio de Caro, as he believed it was necessary to reduce the size of the ensemble as a way to cope with the crisis tango was experiencing at the time. However, he never carried out that change.

In 1966, the orchestra had to suspend its activities due to an illness affecting Pugliese, and it was then that six of its members formed the Sexteto Tango in October 1968. They began performing with a debut at Caño 14, one of the leading tango venues of the time. When Pugliese returned to activity shortly afterward, the members played in both groups before eventually parting ways on the best of terms. A few months later, they recorded their first LP, titled Presentación del Sexteto Tango, for the RCA Victor label, which included pieces such as Quejas de bandoneón, Amurado, La bordona, and Danzarín.

== Later career ==
Their appearance on the hugely popular television show Sábados Circulares, hosted by Pipo Mancera on Canal 13, gave them widespread exposure. This was followed by international tours, including performances at the Victoria Plaza hotel and the Solís Theatre in Montevideo, as well as in the United States, Latin America, and Europe.

In Paris they performed for two months at the Les Trottoirs de Buenos Aires. In 1974, they played at the Teatro Colón in Buenos Aires, joining their musicians with the voices of Roberto Goyeneche and Edmundo Rivero. That night, Aníbal Troilo, Horacio Salgán, and Florindo Sassone also took part in the show.

Sexteto Tango recorded eleven LPs, all under the RCA Victor label, except for one produced in Japan for the CBS Columbia record company. One of them, released in 1983, features twelve tracks performed by Goyeneche, including standout pieces such as the tango Estrella by Marcelino Hernández and Roberto Cassinelli, and the little waltz Esquinas porteñas by Sebastián Piana and Homero Manzi.

In 1985 and 1995, Sexteto Tango received Diplomas of Merit from the Konex Awards in the Popular Music category.

Their performances continued until 1991.

== Original members ==
The original members were:

- Osvaldo Ruggiero (bandoneon)
- Víctor Lavallén (bandoneon)
- Emilio Balcarce (violin)
- Oscar Herrero (violin)
- Julián Plaza (piano)
- Alcides Rossi (double bass)
- Jorge Maciel (voice)
