= Carlos Almada =

Argentine tango singer

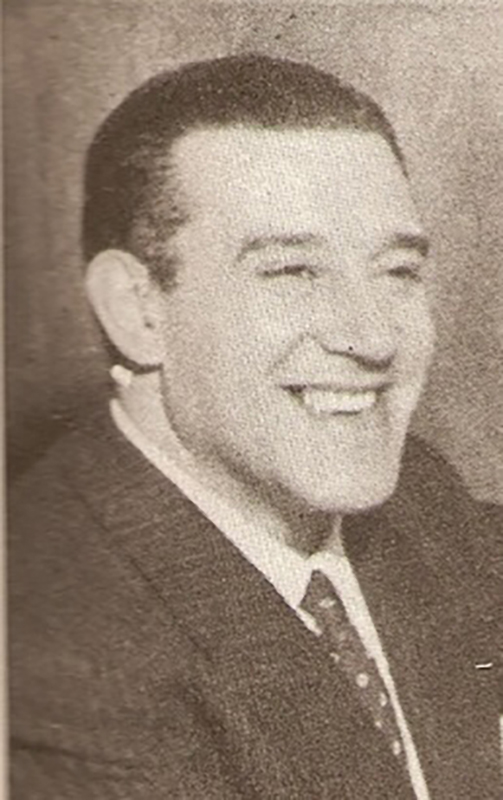
- Carlos Almada

Background information
- Born: 26 March 1918; Villa del Parque, Buenos Aires, Argentina
- Origin: Argentina
- Died: 9 July 1982 (aged 64) Buenos Aires, Argentina
- Genres: Tango
- Occupation: Singer

Carlos Almada (26 March 1918 – 9 July 1982) was an Argentine tango music singer. Considered one of the representative voices of the 1940s generation, he had a long career performing with renowned orchestras.

== Life ==
=== Early years ===
Carlos Almada was born on 26 March 1918 in the neighborhood of Villa del Parque. By the age of twelve, he was already performing as an amateur singer in shows organized by the city government, singing tangos such as "Serpentina de esperanza" on Avenida de Mayo.

During his adolescence, he took singing lessons with maestro Eduardo Bonessi, which allowed him to perfect his vocal technique and develop the vibrato that would become his signature.

=== Professional career ===
In 1932, Almada was invited by violinist Óscar de la Fuente to join his sextet as a singer, performing at Café El Nacional on Corrientes Street. Later, he joined the bandoneonist Hugo Calasí’s group and, subsequently, became part of the orchestras of Alberto Pugliese (brother of Osvaldo Pugliese) and conductor Alejandro Scarpino.

In 1944, he joined Víctor D'Amario's orchestra, where he shared the stage with singer Adolfo Rivas. Two years later, in February 1946, Lucio Demare invited him to replace Horacio Quintana as lead singer. With Demare's orchestra, he took part in radio performances, appeared at Confitería Rucca, and went on an international tour that included a notable performance in Cuba. Despite the significance of this period, no recordings of his time with Demare have been preserved.

After his return to Buenos Aires, Almada joined Edgardo Donato’s orchestra, sharing the microphone with the young singer Oscar Ferrari. Together, they performed at venues such as Radio El Mundo, the confitería La Armonía, the Tango Bar, and the Marabú dance hall. This duo remained active until 1949, when Ferrari left to join José Basso's orchestra.

In 1950, he began his first official recordings with Edgardo Donato's orchestra for the Pampa label, recording classic tangos such as "Che bandoneón," "Mamboretá," "A media luz," "Pituca," "Se va la vida," "Cómo se pianta la vida," "El patio de la Morocha," "El vinacho," "Por quién doblan las campanas," "El camión," "Muchacho," and "El huracán."

His last recording with Donato was the tango "Mi serenata" (June 1952), a duet with Alberto Podestá.

At the beginning of 1953, Almada replaced Héctor Coral in Alfredo Gobbi's orchestra. With Gobbi, he recorded "As de cartón" (April 1953), followed by "Aunque seas mujer" and "Por qué canto así." After a year, he temporarily returned to Víctor D'Amario's group and, in 1956, collaborated again with Lucio Demare during a series broadcast by Radio Belgrano.

In 1959, Almada returned to Edgardo Donato’s orchestra, accompanying singer Artemio Rolando. Starting in 1960, health problems led him to gradually reduce his performances. Although he continued to participate occasionally in clubs and gatherings of tango enthusiasts, his presence on the Buenos Aires scene became increasingly sporadic.

He died on 9 July 1982 in Buenos Aires.

== Notable discography ==
=== With Edgardo Donato (Pampa, 1950–1952) ===
- "Che bandoneón"
- "Mamboretá"
- "A media luz"
- "Pituca"
- "Se va la vida"
- "Cómo se pianta la vida"
- "El patio de la Morocha"
- "El vinacho"
- "Por quién doblan las campanas"
- "El camión"
- "Muchacho"
- "El huracán"
- "Mi serenata" (with Alberto Podestá; June 1952)

=== With Alfredo Gobbi (1953–1954) ===
- "As de cartón" (April 1953)
- "Aunque seas mujer"
- "Por qué canto así"
