= Roberto Pansera =

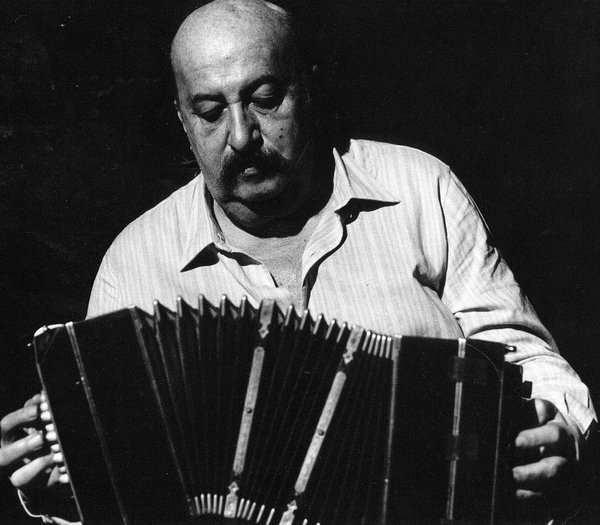
- Roberto Pansera

Background information
- Born: 20 May 1932; Mar del Plata, Argentina
- Died: 6 May 2005 (aged 72) Buenos Aires, Argentina
- Genres: Tango
- Occupations: Organist, bandoneonist, arranger, orchestra conductor

Roberto Pansera (20 May 1932 – 6 May 2005), whose full name was Roberto Vicente Pansera, was a bandoneonist, organist, orchestra conductor, and arranger dedicated to the tango genre.

He had a solid musical education and participated in various orchestras, achieving his most brilliant period as an arranger and bandoneonist in Osvaldo Fresedo’s orchestra.

== Early years ==
His parents were Vicente Pansera and Elisa Carmen Petraso. He was born in Mar del Plata and raised in the neighborhoods of Constitución and Barracas in Buenos Aires, as his family moved to the city when he was 4 years old.

He began playing the bandoneon by ear when his uncle gave him a small instrument, until his father sent him to study with maestro Domingo Federico.

== Professional career ==
In 1944, with his father's formal permission, he made his debut in Cristóbal Herreros' sextet, alongside José Libertella (1933–2004).

In 1945, Domingo Federico connected him with Juan Carlos Cobián, who included him in his ensemble. From then on, he was influenced by music masters such as Astor Piazzolla, who encouraged him to study harmony; Alberto Ginastera, with whom he studied harmonization, composition, and piano in particular—and who secured him a scholarship to study at the Santa Cecilia Institute in Italy—as well as Eduardo Scalise and Osvaldo Fresedo.

Upon returning from the trip, Pansera joined the Francini-Pontier orchestra, sharing the bandoneon section with Ángel Domínguez, Nicolás Paracino, and Pontier himself.

He later joined the orchestra of pianist Eduardo Scalise to perform at the seaside resort of Punta del Este, Uruguay. In 1950, when Scalise joined Osvaldo Fresedo’s orchestra, Pansera did as well, and within a few months, he began arranging the orchestra’s new pieces. During that decade, as the orchestra incorporated works by Piazzolla into its repertoire and renewed some of its classics, Pansera’s avant-garde ideas, along with the contributions of Roberto Pérez Prechi—who had known him since their time in Herreros’ ensemble—played a key role in one of the most notable periods of Fresedo’s career, as can be heard in his recordings for the Odeon label initially, and later for Columbia.

In 1957, he took part in the creation of Astor Piazzolla's experimental Octeto Buenos Aires, although he did not participate in the recordings.

One night, the American Dizzy Gillespie—one of the greatest trumpet players in the world—unexpectedly showed up at the Buenos Aires nightclub where Pansera was performing. He was invited to take the stage and put on a small concert, improvising on his trumpet over the pieces the orchestra was playing. Among the works performed—which included Adiós muchachos and Capricho de amor by Pérez Prechi—was also Preludio No. 3 by Pansera, which caught Gillespie’s attention and led him to invite the composer to travel to the United States.

Pansera settled in the United States for a time, undertook several tours through various countries along the Pacific coast, and released his album Pansera 3, featuring both his own compositions and works by well-known authors.

He also provided musical accompaniment for singers from that country and for Paul McCartney, for whom he arranged pieces included in the album Working Classical, as well as the music for the memorial dedicated to McCartney’s late wife, Linda.

His work as an arranger earned him several honors, including receiving the award for Best Latin American Work at Yale University in 1984 for his piece Concerto for Wind Instruments, and the Konex Award in 1995.

Upon his return from the United States, he continued working with Fresedo, formed his own ensemble featuring the voice of Gloria Wilson—incorporating unconventional instruments—and conducted orchestras that accompanied singers such as Roberto Goyeneche, Néstor Fabián, Reynaldo Martín, Andrés Falgás, and Mercedes Sosa, including on recordings. He also worked in the academic sphere with Manuel Rego’s quintet and contributed to the tango album recorded by Plácido Domingo. Later, he composed, together with Fresedo and Roberto Lambertucci, the twelve tracks for the album Los 10 mandamientos (The 10 Commandments).

In 1969, he recorded Barriada de tango with Roberto Florio and Yo pecador with Carlos Dante, for the Alanicky label. In 1970, he joined José Basso’s orchestra on a long tour of Japan, which also included violinists Oscar Rodríguez, José Fernández, Armando Husso, and José Singlia; bandoneonists Juan Carlos Bera, Eduardo Corti, and Lisandro Adrover; bassist Francisco de Lorenzo; and singers Alfredo Belusi and Carlos Rossi. They then spent quite some time in Venezuela, and upon returning to Argentina, he joined Mariano Mores’ orchestra, where he played several instruments and toured abroad multiple times. He also traveled around the world with the show Tango argentino, participated in the Granada Festival conducting his orchestra, and toward the end of his career, he was the arranger and conductor of a youth orchestra called El espejo de Aníbal Troilo, to which he gave the Pichuco style.

He composed numerous pieces, such as Desconocida, Mi canción de ausencia, Miedo, Naturaleza muerta, Qué lejos mi Buenos Aires (when he was living in Caracas), El pibe de La Paternal, Preludio No. 3, Renacimiento, Réquiem para John F. Kennedy, Sombra de humo, and Trenza de ocho. Together with Fresedo and Lambertucci, he composed the 12 tangos that make up Los 10 mandamientos.

In 1985, he composed, together with Domingo Federico and based on a text by Miguel Jubany, the tango opera Evita. Volveré y seré millones (Evita. I Will Return and Be Millions), which was recorded on a long-play album featuring performances by Carlos Acuña, Alberto Hidalgo, Hugo Marcel, Antonio Tormo, Nelly Vázquez, and Héctor Gagliardi. It is a popular opera in three continuous acts that received no impact and was never premiered. It consisted of pieces from different genres—songs, carnavalito, huella, malambo, marches, the milongas Damas de caridad and Milonga del 17, the tango Un llanto de piba, and the waltz La turbia ofensa.

In 1954, he composed the music for the film Se necesita un hombre con cara de infeliz, directed by Homero Cárpena.

While performing with his tango ensemble at the Esquina Tango venue in the San Telmo neighborhood, Pansera suffered a heart attack and, despite receiving medical care at the Güemes Sanatorium where he was quickly taken, he died hours later on March 6, 2005. His remains were buried in the La Chacarita Cemetery in the Sadaic mausoleum, an organization of which Pansera was elected president in 1982.
