= Lavallén =

Lavallén is a surname. Notable people with the surname include:

- Alejo Lorenzo Lingua Lavallén (born 2001), Argentine tennis player
- Pablo Lavallén (born 1972), Argentine football manager and former football defender
- Víctor Lavallén, Argentine musician
