= Dancing with the Stars (American TV series) season 14 =

Dancing with the Stars
- Season 14
- Promotional poster, featuring former pro dancers Kym Johnson and Tristan MacManus
- Hosted by: Tom Bergeron; Brooke Burke Charvet
- Judges: Carrie Ann Inaba; Len Goodman; Bruno Tonioli
- Celebrity winner: Donald Driver
- Professional winner: Peta Murgatroyd
- No. of episodes: 19

Release
- Original network: ABC
- Original release: March 19 – May 22, 2012

Season chronology
- ← Previous; Season 13 Next → Season 15

Season fourteen of Dancing with the Stars premiered on March 19, 2012, on the ABC network.

Starting the week of April 16, and for the next two weeks after that, the bottom two couples competed in a dance duel. Both couples performed at the same time, at which point the judges decided who would be eliminated that week.

Green Bay Packers wide receiver Donald Driver and Peta Murgatroyd won the competition over British classical singer Katherine Jenkins and Mark Ballas, who finished second, and Cuban-American Telenovela star William Levy and Cheryl Burke, who finished third.

This season introduced "Ballroom Battles" where Cheryl Burke, Mark Ballas, Louis van Amstel, Lacey Schwimmer, Karina Smirnoff, and Tony Dovolani trained a pair of amateur dancers to compete against other amateur couples. The teams of Burke, Dovolani, and van Amstel competed in the final stage by performing a jive. Burke's team were named the champions by the judges with Dovolani's and van Amstel's teams taking second and third places respectively.

== Cast ==
=== Couples ===
This season featured twelve celebrity contestants. Two new professionals were added to the dance troupe: Henry Byalikov and Emma Slater. They joined Sharna Burgess, Kiki Nyemchek, Oksana Dmytrenko, and Sasha Farber.

Celebrity	Notability	Professional partner	Status
Martina Navratilova	Professional tennis player	Tony Dovolani	Eliminated 1st on March 27, 2012
Jack Wagner	Actor & singer	Anna Trebunskaya	Eliminated 2nd on April 3, 2012
Sherri Shepherd	The View panelist & actress	Valentin Chmerkovskiy	Eliminated 3rd on April 10, 2012
Gavin DeGraw	Singer-songwriter	Karina Smirnoff	Eliminated 4th on April 17, 2012
Gladys Knight	Soul singer	Tristan MacManus	Eliminated 5th on April 24, 2012
Jaleel White	Television actor	Kym Johnson	Eliminated 6th on May 1, 2012
Roshon Fegan	Disney Channel actor & rapper	Chelsie Hightower	Eliminated 7th on May 8, 2012
Melissa Gilbert	Actress	Maksim Chmerkovskiy	Eliminated 8th on May 8, 2012
Maria Menounos	Television host	Derek Hough	Eliminated 9th on May 15, 2012
William Levy	Telenovela actor	Cheryl Burke	Third place on May 22, 2012
Katherine Jenkins	Classical singer	Mark Ballas	Runners-up on May 22, 2012
Donald Driver	NFL wide receiver for Green Bay Packers	Peta Murgatroyd	Winners on May 22, 2012

=== Host and judges ===
Tom Bergeron and Brooke Burke Charvet returned as co-hosts, while Carrie Ann Inaba, Len Goodman, and Bruno Tonioli returned as judges. The Harold Wheeler orchestra and singers provided the music throughout the season.

== Scoring chart ==
The highest score each week is indicated in bold green with a dagger (†), while the lowest score each week is indicated in italicized red with a double-dagger (‡).

Color key:

Winners
Runners-up
Third place
Bottom two
Eliminated

Dancing with the Stars (season 14) - Weekly scores
Couple	Pl.	Week											
Couple	Pl.	1	2	1+2	3	4	5	6	7	8	9	10	
Couple	Pl.	1	2	1+2	3	4	5	6	7	8	9	Night 1	Night 2
Donald & Peta	1st	21	24	45	26	**27**†	27	27+7=34	27+26=53	27+28=55	28+29=57	29+30=59‡	+30=89‡ (Note: This couple finished in first place.)
Katherine & Mark	2nd	**26**†	**26**†	**52**†	**29**†	24	**29**†	29+10=**39**†	27+27=54	26+29=55	29+27=56‡	30+30=**60**†	+30=**90**† (Note: This couple finished in second place.)
William & Cheryl	3rd	24	25	49	28	22	**29**†	27+9=36	27+26=53	30+27=**57**†	28+30=58	30+29=59‡	+30=89‡ (Note: This couple finished in third place.)
Maria & Derek	4th	21	25	46	27	26	27	26+4=30	30+27=**57**†	28+25=53	30+29=**59**† (Note: This couple was eliminated.)		
Melissa & Maks	5th	20‡	20	40	24‡	22	21	24+6=30	21+26=47‡	24+27=51‡			
Roshon & Chelsie	6th	23	**26**†	49	25	26 (Note: This couple was in the bottom two, but was not eliminated.)	26	23+5=28	25+27=52	29+27=56			
Jaleel & Kym	7th	**26**†	22	48	25	22	24	29+8=37	24+27=51				
Gladys & Tristan	8th	23	19	42	24‡	20‡	22	21+3=24‡					
Gavin & Karina	9th	20‡	21	41	24‡	23	19‡						
Sherri & Val	10th	23	23	46	24‡	21							
Jack & Anna	11th	23	21	44	24‡								
Martina & Tony	12th	20‡	17‡	37‡									

== Weekly scores ==
Individual judges' scores in the charts below (given in parentheses) are listed in this order from left to right: Carrie Ann Inaba, Len Goodman, Bruno Tonioli.

=== Week 1: First Dances ===
Couples performed either the cha-cha-cha or foxtrot, and are listed in the order they performed.

Couple	Scores	Dance	Music
Maria & Derek	21 (7, 7, 7)	Cha-cha-cha	"Stronger (What Doesn't Kill You)" — Kelly Clarkson
Jack & Anna	23 (8, 7, 8)	Foxtrot	"Sugar Town" — Nancy Sinatra
Donald & Peta	21 (7, 7, 7)	Cha-cha-cha	"Dedication to My Ex (Miss That)" — Lloyd, feat. Lil Wayne
Gavin & Karina	20 (7, 6, 7)	Foxtrot	"I Run to You" — Lady Antebellum
Roshon & Chelsie	23 (8, 7, 8)	Cha-cha-cha	"Glad You Came" — The Wanted
Sherri & Val	23 (8, 7, 8)	Foxtrot	"Sherry" — Frankie Valli & The Four Seasons
Melissa & Maks	20 (7, 6, 7)	Cha-cha-cha	"Ain't No Mountain High Enough" — Marvin Gaye & Tammi Terrell
William & Cheryl	24 (8, 8, 8)	Cha-cha-cha	"International Love" — Pitbull, feat. Chris Brown
Martina & Tony	20 (7, 6, 7)	Foxtrot	"Is You Is or Is You Ain't My Baby" — Louis Jordan
Katherine & Mark	26 (9, 8, 9)	Foxtrot	"The Show" — Lenka
Gladys & Tristan	23 (8, 7, 8)	Cha-cha-cha	"Best of My Love" — The Emotions
Jaleel & Kym	26 (9, 8, 9)	Foxtrot	"The Way You Look Tonight" — Frank Sinatra

=== Week 2: First Elimination ===
Couples performed either the jive or quickstep, and are listed in the order they performed.

Couple	Scores	Dance	Music	Result
Roshon & Chelsie	26 (9, 8, 9)	Quickstep	"Lifestyles of the Rich and Famous" — Good Charlotte	Safe
Sherri & Val	23 (8, 7, 8)	Jive	"Proud Mary" — Ike & Tina Turner	Safe
Melissa & Maks	20 (7, 6, 7)	Quickstep	"Dancing with Myself" — Billy Idol	Safe
Jack & Anna	21 (7, 7, 7)	Jive	"Gimme Some Lovin" — The Spencer Davis Group	Safe
Gladys & Tristan	19 (7, 5, 7)	Quickstep	"Sir Duke" — Stevie Wonder	Safe
Katherine & Mark	26 (9, 8, 9)	Jive	"Ain't Nothing Wrong With That" — Robert Randolph and the Family Band	Safe
Jaleel & Kym	22 (7, 7, 8)	Jive	"Marry You" — Bruno Mars	Safe
Maria & Derek	25 (8, 8, 9)	Quickstep	"Sexy, Sexy!" — The Brian Setzer Orchestra	Safe
Martina & Tony	17 (6, 5, 6)	Jive	"Tell Her About It" — Billy Joel	Eliminated
Donald & Peta	24 (8, 8, 8)	Quickstep	"Stay the Night" — James Blunt	Safe
Gavin & Karina	21 (7, 7, 7)	Jive	"Real Wild Child" — Johnny O'Keefe	Bottom two
William & Cheryl	25 (9, 7, 9)	Quickstep	"Nice Work If You Can Get It" — George Gershwin	Safe

=== Week 3: Most Memorable Year Week ===
Couples are listed in the order they performed.

Couple	Scores	Dance	Music	Result
Jack & Anna	24 (8, 8, 8)	Samba	"Lighting Up the Night" — Jack Wagner	Eliminated
Maria & Derek	27 (9, 9, 9)	Rumba	"Material Girl" — Madonna	Safe
Gladys & Tristan	24 (8, 8, 8)	Foxtrot	"Cupid" — Sam Cooke	Safe
Roshon & Chelsie	25 (8, 8, 9)	Samba	"I Want You Back" — The Jackson 5	Safe
Gavin & Karina	24 (8, 8, 8)	Rumba	"New York State of Mind" — Billy Joel	Bottom two
Katherine & Mark	29 (10, 9, 10)	Waltz	"To Where You Are" — Josh Groban	Safe
Sherri & Val	24 (8, 8, 8)	Rumba	"If I Could" — Regina Belle	Safe
Melissa & Maks	24 (8, 8, 8)	Jive	"Dog Days Are Over" — Florence + the Machine	Safe
Jaleel & Kym	25 (9, 8, 8)	Rumba	"For the Cool in You" — Babyface	Safe
William & Cheryl	28 (9, 9, 10)	Salsa	"La Vida Es Un Carnaval" — Celia Cruz	Safe
Donald & Peta	26 (9, 8, 9)	Rumba	"One Sweet Day" — Mariah Carey & Boyz II Men	Safe

=== Week 4: Rock Week ===
Couples are listed in the order they performed.

Couple	Scores	Dance	Music	Result
Sherri & Val	21 (7, 7, 7)	Tango	"Cum On Feel the Noize" — Quiet Riot	Eliminated
Katherine & Mark	24 (8, 8, 8)	Paso doble	"Time Is Running Out" — Muse	Safe
Jaleel & Kym	22 (8, 7, 7)	Tango	"(I Can't Get No) Satisfaction" — The Rolling Stones	Safe
Melissa & Maks	22 (7, 8, 7)	Paso doble	"Conquest" — The White Stripes	Safe
Donald & Peta	27 (9, 9, 9)	Paso doble	"Purple Haze" — Jimi Hendrix	Safe
Gladys & Tristan	20 (7, 6, 7)	Tango	"Bohemian Rhapsody" — Queen	Safe
William & Cheryl	22 (7, 7, 8)	Jive	"We're Not Gonna Take It" — Twisted Sister	Safe
Roshon & Chelsie	26 (9, 8, 9)	Viennese waltz	"The Time of My Life" — David Cook	Bottom two
Maria & Derek	26 (9, 8, 9)	Tango	"School's Out" — Alice Cooper	Safe
Gavin & Karina	23 (8, 8, 7)	Tango	"Paint It Black" — The Rolling Stones	Safe

=== Week 5: Latin Week ===
Couples are listed in the order they performed.

Couple	Scores	Dance	Music	Result
Jaleel & Kym	24 (8, 8, 8)	Samba	"Rhythm Is Gonna Get You" — Gloria Estefan	Bottom two
Melissa & Maks	21 (7, 7, 7)	Salsa	"Aguanilé" — Hector Lavoe	Safe
Maria & Derek	27 (9, 9, 9)	Salsa	"The Cup of Life" — Ricky Martin	Safe
Katherine & Mark	29 (10, 9, 10)	Argentine tango	"Tanguedia II" — Astor Piazzolla	Safe
Gavin & Karina	19 (6, 6, 7)	Samba	"Sweetheart from Venezuela" — Harry Belafonte	Bottom two
William & Cheryl	29 (10, 9, 10)	Argentine tango	"Buttons" — The Pussycat Dolls	Safe
Gladys & Tristan	22 (7, 7, 8)	Samba	"Fiebre" — La Lupe	Safe
Roshon & Chelsie	26 (9, 8, 9)	Salsa	"Bumpy Ride" — Mohombi	Safe
Donald & Peta	27 (10, 8, 9)	Argentine tango	"Sin Rumbo" — Otros Aires	Safe

Dance duel
Couple	Dance	Music	Result
Gavin & Karina	Cha-cha-cha	"The Edge of Glory" — Lady Gaga	Eliminated
Jaleel & Kym	Cha-cha-cha	"The Edge of Glory" — Lady Gaga	Safe

Judges' votes to save

- Carrie Ann: Jaleel & Kym
- Len: Jaleel & Kym
- Bruno: Jaleel & Kym

=== Week 6: Motown Week ===
Couples are listed in the order they performed.

Couple	Scores	Dance	Motown music	Result
Gladys & Tristan	21 (7, 7, 7)	Rumba	"My Girl" — The Temptations	Bottom two
Maria & Derek	26 (8, 9, 9)	Foxtrot	"Jimmy Mack" — Martha and the Vandellas	Safe
Roshon & Chelsie	23 (7, 8, 8)	Rumba	"Cruisin'" — Smokey Robinson	Bottom two
Katherine & Mark	29 (10, 9, 10)	Samba	"I Can't Get Next to You" — The Temptations	Safe
Donald & Peta	27 (9, 9, 9)	Foxtrot	"The Way You Do the Things You Do" — The Temptations	Safe
Melissa & Maks	24 (8, 8, 8)	Viennese waltz	"Ooo Baby Baby" — Smokey Robinson & the Miracles	Safe
Jaleel & Kym	29 (10, 9, 10)	Cha-cha-cha	"Ain't Too Proud to Beg" — The Temptations	Safe
William & Cheryl	27 (9, 8, 10)	Rumba	"Being with You" — Smokey Robinson	Safe
Gladys & Tristan	3	Freestyle; Marathon	"Nowhere to Run" — Martha and the Vandellas	
Maria & Derek	4	Freestyle; Marathon	"Nowhere to Run" — Martha and the Vandellas	
Roshon & Chelsie	5	Freestyle; Marathon	"Nowhere to Run" — Martha and the Vandellas	
Melissa & Maks	6	Freestyle; Marathon	"Nowhere to Run" — Martha and the Vandellas	
Donald & Peta	7	Freestyle; Marathon	"Nowhere to Run" — Martha and the Vandellas	
Jaleel & Kym	8	Freestyle; Marathon	"Nowhere to Run" — Martha and the Vandellas	
William & Cheryl	9	Freestyle; Marathon	"Nowhere to Run" — Martha and the Vandellas	
Katherine & Mark	10	Freestyle; Marathon	"Nowhere to Run" — Martha and the Vandellas	

Dance duel
Couple	Dance	Music	Result
Roshon & Chelsie	Jive	"Don't Stop Me Now" — Queen	Safe
Gladys & Tristan	Jive	"Don't Stop Me Now" — Queen	Eliminated

Judges' votes to save

- Carrie Ann: Gladys & Tristan
- Len: Roshon & Chelsie
- Bruno: Roshon & Chelsie

=== Week 7: Classical Week ===
Couples are listed in the order they performed.

Couple	Scores	Dance	Classical music	Result
Katherine & Mark	27 (9, 9, 9)	Rumba	"Pachelbel's Canon" — Johann Pachelbel	Safe
Melissa & Maks	21 (7, 7, 7)	Argentine tango	"The Marriage of Figaro" — Wolfgang Mozart	Safe
William & Cheryl	27 (9, 9, 9)	Viennese waltz	"Ave Maria" — Franz Schubert (performed by Jackie Evancho)	Safe
Roshon & Chelsie	25 (9, 8, 8)	Argentine tango	"Bad Romance (Instrumental)" — Lady Gaga	Bottom two
Donald & Peta	27 (9, 9, 9)	Viennese waltz	"La donna è mobile" — Giuseppe Verdi (performed by Vittorio Grigolo)	Safe
Maria & Derek	30 (10, 10, 10)	Paso doble	"Montagues and Capulets" — Sergei Prokofiev	Safe
Jaleel & Kym	24 (8, 8, 8)	Viennese waltz	"Did I Make the Most of Loving You?" — Mary-Jess Leaverland	Bottom two
Jaleel & Kym Katherine & Mark Maria & Derek Roshon & Chelsie	27 (10, 8, 9)	Team; Tango	"Toccata" — David Garrett	
Melissa & Maks William & Cheryl Donald & Peta	26 (9, 8, 9)	Team; Paso doble	"O Fortuna" — Carl Orff (performed by Vittorio Grigolo)	

Dance duel
Couple	Dance	Music	Result
Roshon & Chelsie	Rumba	"Set Fire to the Rain" — Adele	Safe
Jaleel & Kym	Rumba	"Set Fire to the Rain" — Adele	Eliminated

Judges' votes to rescue

- Carrie Ann: Roshon & Chelsie
- Len: Roshon & Chelsie
- Bruno: Roshon & Chelsie

=== Week 8: Trio Week ===
All six couples chose one professional who was either previously eliminated or participated in the dance troupe to perform with them in their Latin routine. Two couples were eliminated at the end of the night. Couples are listed in the order they performed.

Couple	Trio partner	Scores	Dance	Music	Result
Donald & Peta	Karina Smirnoff	27 (9, 9, 9)	Tango	"Higher Ground" — Stevie Wonder	Safe
Donald & Peta	Karina Smirnoff	28 (10, 9, 9)	Jive	"Rip It Up" — Little Richard	Safe
Maria & Derek	Henry Byalikov	28 (10, 8, 10)	Viennese waltz	"A Thousand Years" — Christina Perri	Safe
Maria & Derek	Henry Byalikov	25 (9, 7, 9)	Samba	"Mama Do the Hump" — Rizzle Kicks	Safe
Melissa & Maks	Valentin Chmerkovskiy	24 (8, 8, 8)	Foxtrot	"Maggie May" — Rod Stewart	Eliminated
Melissa & Maks	Valentin Chmerkovskiy	27 (9, 9, 9)	Samba	"Hard to Handle" — The Black Crowes	Eliminated
Katherine & Mark	Tristan MacManus	26 (8, 9, 9)	Viennese waltz	"Kathleen" — David Gray	Safe
Katherine & Mark	Tristan MacManus	29 (10, 9, 10)	Cha-cha-cha	"She's a Lady" — Tom Jones	Safe
Roshon & Chelsie	Sasha Farber	29 (10, 9, 10)	Foxtrot	"Sweet Pea" — Amos Lee	Eliminated
Roshon & Chelsie	Sasha Farber	27 (9, 9, 9)	Paso doble	"Turn Me On" — David Guetta, feat. Nicki Minaj	Eliminated
William & Cheryl	Tony Dovolani	30 (10, 10, 10)	Foxtrot	"Stray Cat Strut" — Stray Cats	Safe
William & Cheryl	Tony Dovolani	27 (9, 9, 9)	Paso doble	"Diablo Rojo" — Rodrigo y Gabriela	Safe

=== Week 9: Semifinals ===
Couples are listed in the order they performed.

Couple	Scores	Dance	Music	Result
William & Cheryl	28 (9, 9, 10)	Tango	"Sweet Dreams (Are Made of This)" — Eurythmics	Safe
William & Cheryl	30 (10, 10, 10)	Samba	"Magalenha" — Sergio Mendes	Safe
Katherine & Mark	29 (10, 9, 10)	Quickstep	"The Dirty Boogie" — The Brian Setzer Orchestra	Safe
Katherine & Mark	27 (9, 9, 9)	Salsa	"Bananza (Belly Dancer)" — Akon	Safe
Donald & Peta	28 (9, 9, 10)	Waltz	"Kissing You" — Des'ree	Safe
Donald & Peta	29 (10, 9, 10)	Samba	"Mr. Big Stuff" — Jean Knight	Safe
Maria & Derek	30 (10, 10, 10)	Argentine tango	"La Yumba" — Osvaldo Pugliese	Eliminated
Maria & Derek	29 (10, 9, 10)	Jive	"Tightrope" — Janelle Monáe, feat. Big Boi	Eliminated

=== Week 10: Finals ===
Couples are listed in the order they performed.

Night 1

Couple	Scores	Dance	Music
William & Cheryl	30 (10, 10, 10)	Cha-cha-cha	"Raise Your Glass" — Pink
William & Cheryl	29 (10, 9, 10)	Freestyle	"Objection (Tango)" — Shakira
Katherine & Mark	30 (10, 10, 10)	Paso doble	"España cañí" — Erich Kunzel
Katherine & Mark	30 (10, 10, 10)	Freestyle	"Sing, Sing, Sing (With a Swing)" — Benny Goodman
Donald & Peta	29 (10, 9, 10)	Argentine tango	"They" — Jem
Donald & Peta	30 (10, 10, 10)	Freestyle	"I Play Chicken with the Train" — Cowboy Troy

Night 2

Couple	Scores	Dance	Music	Result
William & Cheryl	30 (10, 10, 10)	Salsa	"Juventud de Presente" — Tito Puente	Third place
Katherine & Mark	30 (10, 10, 10)	Jive	"Splish Splash" — Bobby Darin	Runners-up
Donald & Peta	30 (10, 10, 10)	Cha-cha-cha	"Beggin'" — Madcon	Winners

== Dance chart ==
The couples performed the following each week:

- Week 1: One unlearned dance (cha-cha-cha or foxtrot)
- Week 2: One unlearned dance (jive or quickstep)
- Week 3: One unlearned dance
- Week 4: One unlearned dance
- Week 5: One unlearned dance
- Week 6: One unlearned dance & Motown marathon
- Week 7: One unlearned dance & team dance
- Week 8: Two unlearned dances
- Week 9 (Semifinals): Two unlearned dances
- Week 10 (Finals, Night 1): Judge's choice dance & freestyle
- Week 10 (Finals, Night 2): 24-hour challenge

Dancing with the Stars (season 14) - Dance chart
Couple	Week															
Couple	1	2	3	4	5	6		7		8		9		10		
Couple	1	2	3	4	5	6		7		8		9		Night 1		Night 2
Donald & Peta	Cha-cha-cha	Quickstep	Rumba	Paso doble	Argentine tango	Foxtrot	Freestyle; Marathon	Viennese waltz	Team Paso doble	Tango	Jive	Waltz	Samba	Argentine tango	Freestyle	Cha-cha-cha
Katherine & Mark	Foxtrot	Jive	Waltz	Paso doble	Argentine tango	Samba	Freestyle; Marathon	Rumba	Team Tango	Viennese waltz	Cha-cha-cha	Quickstep	Salsa	Paso doble	Freestyle	Jive
William & Cheryl	Cha-cha-cha	Quickstep	Salsa	Jive	Argentine tango	Rumba	Freestyle; Marathon	Viennese waltz	Team Paso doble	Foxtrot	Paso doble	Tango	Samba	Cha-cha-cha	Freestyle	Salsa
Maria & Derek	Cha-cha-cha	Quickstep	Rumba	Tango	Salsa	Foxtrot	Freestyle; Marathon	Paso doble	Team Tango	Viennese waltz	Samba	Argentine tango	Jive			
Melissa & Maks	Cha-cha-cha	Quickstep	Jive	Paso doble	Salsa	Viennese waltz	Freestyle; Marathon	Argentine tango	Team Paso doble	Foxtrot	Samba					
Roshon & Chelsie	Cha-cha-cha	Quickstep	Samba	Viennese waltz	Salsa	Rumba	Freestyle; Marathon	Argentine tango	Team Tango	Foxtrot	Paso doble					
Jaleel & Kym	Foxtrot	Jive	Rumba	Tango	Samba	Cha-cha-cha	Freestyle; Marathon	Viennese waltz	Team Tango							
Gladys & Tristan	Cha-cha-cha	Quickstep	Foxtrot	Tango	Samba	Rumba	Freestyle; Marathon									
Gavin & Karina	Foxtrot	Jive	Rumba	Tango	Samba											
Sherri & Val	Foxtrot	Jive	Rumba	Tango												
Jack & Anna	Foxtrot	Jive	Samba													
Martina & Tony	Foxtrot	Jive														

== Ratings ==
Show	Episode	Air date	Viewers (millions)	Rating/share Adults 18–49	Weekly Viewer rank	Weekly Adults 18–49 rank
1	"Top 12 Perform (Week 1)"	March 19, 2012	18.79	3.5/9	2	6
2	"Top 12 Perform (Week 2)"	March 26, 2012	17.96	3.2/8	2	9
3	"Top 12 Results"	March 27, 2012	15.74	3.1/8	6	10
4	"Top 11 Perform"	April 2, 2012	16.87	2.9/8	3	10
5	"Top 11 Results"	April 3, 2012	15.61	2.8/7	4	14
6	"Top 10 Perform"	April 9, 2012	16.39	3.0/8	3	12
7	"Top 10 Results"	April 10, 2012	13.39	2.3/6	5	27
8	"Top 9 Perform"	April 16, 2012	16.65	2.9/8	3	13
9	"Top 9 Results"	April 17, 2012	14.17	2.5/7	5	19
10	"Top 8 Perform"	April 23, 2012	17.62	3.2/8	1	7
11	"Top 8 Results"	April 24, 2012	14.54	2.4/6	4	15
12	"Top 7 Perform"	April 30, 2012	16.20	2.8/7	3	15
13	"Top 7 Results"	May 1, 2012	13.87	2.4/6	6	25
14	"Top 6 Perform"	May 7, 2012	16.37	2.7/7	3	20
15	"Top 6 Results"	May 8, 2012	13.71	2.4/6	7	25
16	"Top 4 Perform"	May 14, 2012	15.79	2.6/7	4	14
17	"Top 4 Results"	May 15, 2012	13.23	2.2/6	8	24
18	"Top 3 Perform"	May 21, 2012	16.84	2.9/8	3	7
19	"Season Finale"	May 22, 2012	17.75	3.3/9	2	4
