= Miguel Montero (tango singer) =

Argentine tango singer

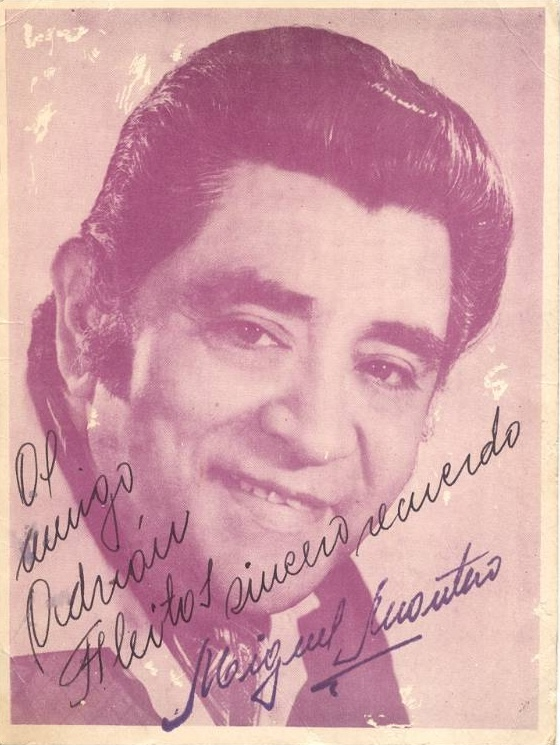
- Miguel Montero

Background information
- Also known as: El Negro de Oro
- Born: Miguel Ángel Montero; July 9, 1922; San Miguel de Tucumán, Argentina
- Origin: Argentina
- Died: August 29, 1975 (aged 53) Buenos Aires, Argentina
- Genres: Tango
- Occupation: Singer

Miguel Ángel Montero (San Miguel de Tucumán, 9 July 1922 – Buenos Aires, 29 August 1975) was an Argentine tango singer. His works at Osvaldo Pugliese's Orchestra were notable, including song 'Acquaforte' and 'Antiguo reloj de cobre' (English: 'Old copper clock').

== Life ==
Miguel Montero was born on 9 July 1922 in San Miguel de Tucumán, in the Argentine province of Tucumán. In 1924 his family moved to the city of Córdoba, and afterwards to Buenos Aires.

In 1938, under the alias Alberto Luna, he worked in Radio Del Pueblo, accompanied by the guitarists José Di Napoli and the brothers Legarreta.

In the early 1940s, he joined Pedro Maffia's orchestra as a professional singer. In 1942, he performed on Radio El Mundo, and in 1943, following Juan Carlos Cobián's return from the United States, he was selected by Cobián as his vocalist and performed alongside him.

In 1965, Armando Cupo accompanied Miguel Montero with his orchestra to record 14 songs for the Odeón label, which included Fuimos, Me están sobrando las penas, Por las calles de la vida, Qué solo estoy, and Tristezas de la calle Corrientes.

He died on 29 August 1975.

== Discography ==
- 1961: "Una guitarra" – ODEON
- 1963: "Miguel Montero" – ODEON
- ????: "Miguel Montero y su orquesta típica – Volumen 1" – ODEON
- 1967: "Por las calles de la vida" – ODEON
- 1968: "Madrugada" – ODEON
- 1969: "Amor y Tango" – EMI ODEON
- ????: "Voz de Tango" – GROVE
- ????: "Ventanita de arrabal" – RCA
- ????: "Y así nació éste tango" – EMI ODEON
- 1970: "Pa' la muchachada" – EMI ODEON
- 1971: "Nuestro pueblo" EMI ODEON
- 1972: "Recordando mi barrio" – EMI ODEON
- 1972: "Inolvidable Negro Montero" – EMI ODEON
- 1972: "Con permiso soy el tango" – EMI ODEON
- 1972: "Pobre mi madre querida" – EMI ODEON
- 1972: "Antiguo reloj de cobre" – EMI ODEON
- 1974: "Jamás lo vas a saber" – EMI ODEON
- 1981: "Sentir de Tango" – EMI ODEON
- 2002: "Sus más grandes canciones" – EMI ODEON
- 2004: "Osvaldo Pugliese – Sus Grandes Éxitos – Cantan Miguel Montero y Jorge Maciel" – EMI ODEON
- 2005: "Sus primeras grabaciones" – EMI ODEON
