= Héctor De Rosas =

Argentine singer (1931–2015)

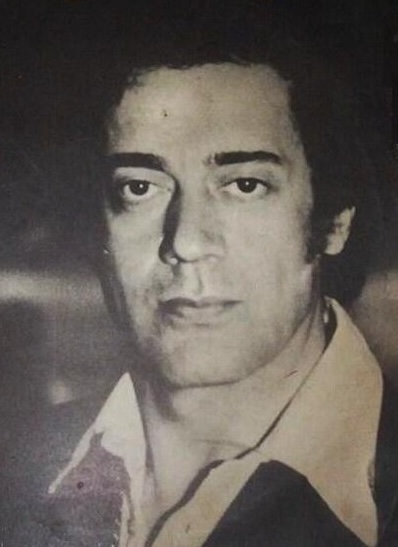
- Héctor De Rosas

Background information
- Born: Héctor Ángel González Padilla; 2 October 1931; Buenos Aires, Argentina
- Origin: Argentina
- Died: 26 July 2015 (aged 83) Buenos Aires, Argentina
- Genre: Tango
- Occupation: Singer
- Instrument: Voice

Héctor Ángel González Padilla (2 October 1931 – 26 July 2015), better known by the stage name Héctor De Rosas, was an Argentine singer dedicated to the tango genre with a long career in his country.

== Early years ==
His father, named Manuel, was a Spanish immigrant who worked for the railroad and was transferred to Tucumán, where he met his mother, named Rosa. They got married and returned to Buenos Aires, where De Rosas was born. Much later, after retiring, His father worked as a caretaker at the Pedro de Mendoza school-museum, where the painter Quinquela Martín had lived, in the neighborhood of La Boca, across from the Riachuelo River.

== Professional career ==
Advised by the singer Martha de los Ríos, De Rosas studied singing from the age of 10 to 23 with Professor Ricardo Domínguez. At 15, he won the "male singers" category in a Radio Belgrano contest sponsored by Radiolandia magazine, which had 12,000 participants. The prize consisted of a six-month performance contract with the radio station. The jury included, among others, Enzo Ardigó and Samuel Yankelevich.

Later on, through Alberto Cosentino and Oscar Rubens, he was introduced to pianist and conductor Osmar Maderna. On July 21, 1949, they recorded the waltz Pequeña, with music by Maderna and lyrics by Homero Expósito. It was so successful that within a few months, there were already 120 versions around the world.

When he heard that a neighbor had commented on “how well the son of Rosa sang” (referring to his mother), he suggested to Maderna the stage name Héctor de la Rosa. However, the conductor found it too pompous and changed it to the final version, Héctor De Rosas. On December 14, 1949, he recorded Divina, the tango by Joaquín Mauricio Mora and Juan De la Calle, which increased his income enough to allow him to buy a house for his parents.

He left Maderna's orchestra to join that of conductor Pedro Laurenz, earning twice as much, but he stayed with the group only briefly. In early 1951, he joined Florindo Sassone's orchestra, and after a few months, he moved on to Eduardo Del Piano's orchestra, with which he recorded 10 tracks—starting on September 17, 1951, with the tango No me pregunten por qué and finishing on May 26, 1955, with Remembranza, performing duets on three of them with Mario Bustos.

In 1958, he began singing with Osvaldo Fresedo’s orchestra at Carnival dances and on the radio program Los Lunes de Cleveland. Roberto Caló offered him a higher salary plus a signing bonus to perform with him; Héctor De Rosas accepted the offer, and with Caló’s new orchestra, he recorded nine tracks, four of which were duets with Rodolfo Galé from Mendoza. While with Caló’s orchestra, De Rosas added the tango Rosa de fuego to his repertoire at the conductor's suggestion, despite not liking it because it strayed from the romantic style he had adopted. Nevertheless, it became a lasting hit that audiences continued to request until the end of his career. De Rosas recorded this tango with Caló on June 19, 1957, with José Basso in 1964, and as a soloist accompanied by guitars and bandoneon in 1978.

In 1959, he formed his own orchestra, partnering with bandoneon player Celso Amato, and they performed on Radio Splendid. The group featured singers such as Rodolfo Galé, Fontán Luna, Tito Reyes, Jorge Sobral, and Carlos Yanel.

Between 1960 and 1963, De Rosas recorded eleven tracks with Astor Piazzolla's Quintet for the Telefunken label, including Nostalgias and Por la vuelta. He also took part in the performance of the operita María de Buenos Aires at the now-closed Teatro Planeta. Regarding Héctor De Rosas's performances during that period, Astor Piazzolla said:

"De Rosas was a neat, meticulous singer. His was not a hot voice, but he never had problems with the music I wrote. He was above Lavié and Trelles, because De Rosas was another thing, an instrument more, a flute, he placed his voice at the exact place where it ought to be."

In 1964, he recorded 11 tracks with José Basso; in 1968, he made 2 recordings with the Orquesta Símbolo Osmar Maderna, conducted by Aquiles Roggero. In 1978, he recorded 12 pieces as a soloist, accompanied by bandoneonist Juan Carlos Bera and guitarists Carlos Peralta, Juan Carlos Gorrías, and Ferreyra, as well as 2 tracks with Raúl Luzzi’s típica orchestra. In 1986, he recorded 2 tracks with the ensemble of violinist Roberto Gallardo.

In 2014, he recorded with the Orquesta Típica Sans Souci and performed at the Usina del Arte.

Héctor De Rosas was also a skilled singing teacher, one of whose first students became his wife and the mother of his children. Among those who studied with him were Juan Carlos Cobos, Marty Cosens, Rosana Falasca, Guillermito Fernández, María Garay, Rubén Juárez, Raúl Faust, and Dany Martin, among other prominent figures in national music. He even founded his own conservatory.

De Rosas composed the Peruvian waltz Un amor que no siento, the waltz Iremos al lago, and the tango Salgo a buscar la calle.

Héctor De Rosas died on July 26, 2015.
