= Cristóbal Herreros =

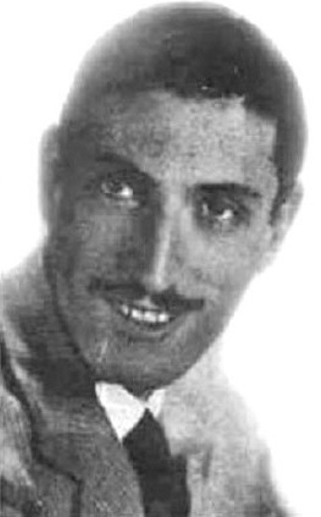

Background information
- Born: Cristóbal Herreros; September 14, 1909; Barcelona, Spain
- Died: December 18, 2002 (aged 93) Buenos Aires Province, Argentina
- Genres: Tango
- Occupations: Bandoneonist, composer, orchestra conductor
- Label: Odeon Records

Cristóbal Herreros (14 September 1909 – 18 December 2002) was a bandoneonist, orchestra conductor, and composer dedicated to the tango genre who carried out his work in Argentina.

== Professional career ==
His family emigrated to Argentina when he was five years old, and they lived in the city of Baradero and later in Campana, where he began studying music, focusing especially on the bandoneon.

In his teenage years, he joined an orchestra made up of musicians of German origin, whose repertoire included the tangos Derecho viejo and 9 de Julio. In 1937, the members of the orchestra — among them Héctor Stamponi, Enrique Francini, and Armando Pontier — moved to Buenos Aires to perform on a popular Radio Prieto program called Las matinées de Juan Manuel.

He later joined Roberto Firpo’s orchestra alongside bandoneonists Juan Carlos Caviello, Juan Cambareri, Ángel Genta, and violinists Orlando Perri, Roberto Rotta, Isidro López, and A. Gerino. Later, he formed a group with Caviello, violinist Natalio Finkelstein, pianist Héctor Lacarrúa, and singer Ignacio Díaz. In 1940, his sextet was born, with which he debuted at Café El Nacional—known as the Cathedral of Tango, where tango music played from noon until two in the morning—performing alongside Alejandro Scarpino’s orchestra and remaining there for approximately 15 years. The original members of the sextet included Mario Caldara, Armando Scottieri, Roberto Pérez Prechi, Roberto Pansera, Héctor Lacarrúa, and singer Alberto Morán; the latter left in 1944 to join Osvaldo Pugliese’s orchestra.

Among the tangos in Morán's repertoire with Herreros were San José de Flores, El abrojito, Maleza, Por qué, Mentira, Hoy al recordarla, Por qué no has venido, Yuyo verde, and two pieces by Herreros: Tango soy, with lyrics by Horacio Sanguinetti, and Ramayón, a tango about a malevo who was killed at the door of a milonga, based on lyrics that Homero Manzi gave him at the request of Nelly Omar, when Herreros was accompanying her with his sextet on a tour through Córdoba. He also composed the music for the anthem of the city of Las Heras, with lyrics by Felipe de Robles.

With his orchestra, he recorded folk music for Odeon and participated as a representative of this genre in a program broadcast by Radio El Mundo called Tango vs. Folklore, in which Juan Sánchez Gorio represented tango.

The assembly hall of the Municipality of General Las Heras bears the name Cristóbal Herreros in his honor.

Cristóbal Herreros died in the province of Buenos Aires on 18 December 2002.
