= Mario Demarco =

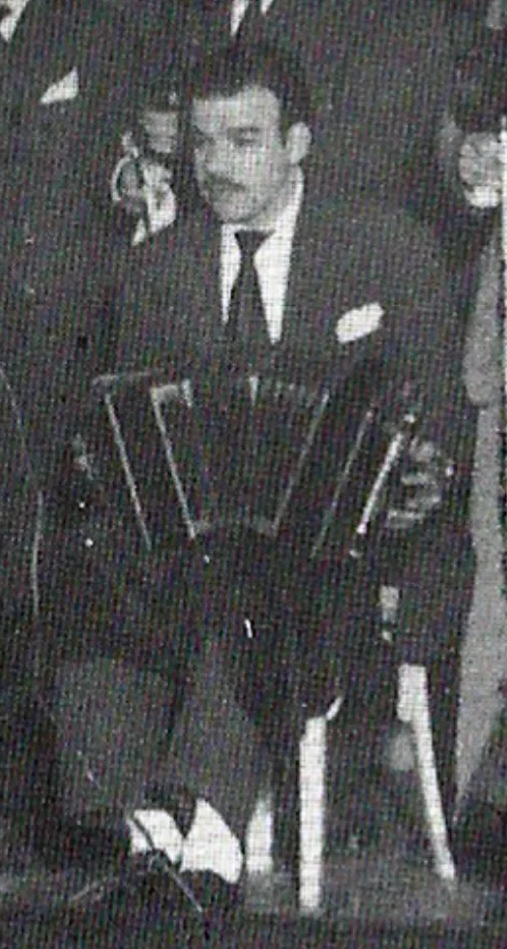
- Mario Demarco

Background information
- Born: Mario Domingo Lapunzina; 5 August 1917; Buenos Aires, Argentina
- Died: 4 February 1970 (aged 52)
- Genres: Tango
- Occupations: Bandoneonist, composer, arranger, orchestra conductor
- Instrument: Bandoneon

Mario Domingo Lapunzina (5 August 1917 – 4 February 1970), better known by his stage name Mario Demarco, was an Argentine bandoneonist, orchestra conductor, arranger, and tango composer.

== Life ==
Born in Buenos Aires, Demarco studied bandoneon with Joaquín Clemente and later harmony and counterpoint with Julián Bautista. In the late 1930s, he began his professional career accompanying solo singers.

In 1941, he joined Antonio Rodio’s orchestra, sharing the stage with musicians such as Héctor Stamponi, Eduardo Rovira, Jaime Gosis, and Máximo Mori. He also had brief appearances in the orchestras of Juan Canaro and Miguel Caló.

In 1942, he joined Alfredo Gobbi’s orchestra, where he remained until 1951. During this period, he developed his own style influenced by the schools of Gobbi and Osvaldo Pugliese, characterized by a distinctive rhythm and a prominent use of the double bass and the left hand of the piano.

In 1951, he formed his own orchestra, which made 18 recordings for the Pathé label before disbanding in 1953.

After a stint with Julio De Caro’s last orchestra, in 1954 he joined Osvaldo Pugliese’s orchestra as a bandoneon player and arranger. There, he recorded his own works such as "Pata ancha" and arranged pieces like "Suipacha" and "Emancipación." In 1959, he left the group for family reasons and worked as an arranger for other musicians.

During the 1960s, he collaborated with artists such as Edmundo Rivero, Jorge Sobral, and Rodolfo Lesica, and briefly returned to the orchestras of Alfredo Gobbi and Joaquín Do Reyes.

In 1965, he founded a new orchestra with young musicians, with which he recorded eight tracks for his label Solfeando. These recordings, especially his eponymous tango "Solfeando," demonstrated his stylistic maturity. He also was part of a trio that performed in venues in the Abasto neighborhood and left works such as "Sensitivo," "Astillas," and "Barro y asfalto."

His health deteriorated toward the end of the decade; in 1968, he had to abandon a recording due to pain that led to the amputation of his left hand.

He died on February 4, 1970, at the age of 52, in a café in Buenos Aires.

== Notable compositions ==
- Entrador
- Pata ancha
- Solfeando
- Sensitivo (with Máximo Mori)
- Quejumbroso
- Emancipación
