= Ángel Díaz (singer) =

Argentine tango singer (1929–1998)

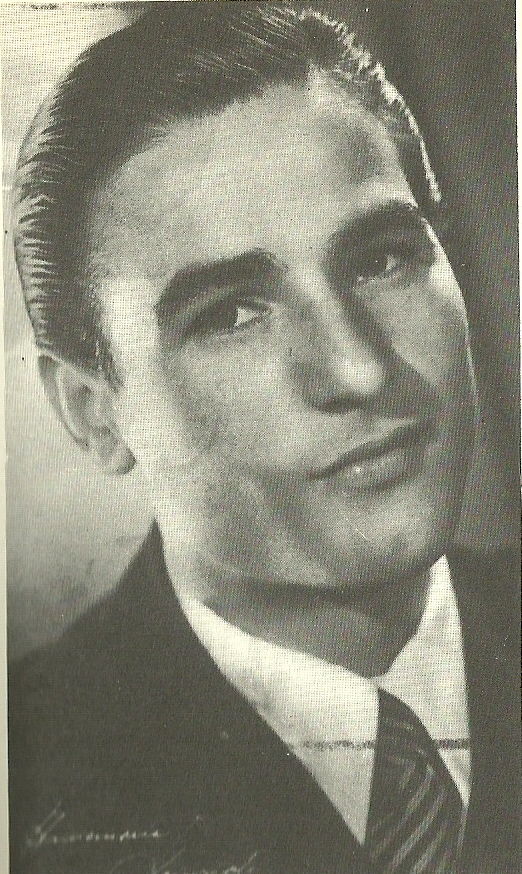
- Ángel Díaz
- Born: April 25, 1929; Buenos Aires, Argentina
- Died: December 11, 1998 (aged 69); Buenos Aires, Argentina
- Occupation: Singer

Ángel Díaz (né Ángel Paya Díaz; 25 April 1929 in Buenos Aires, Argentina – 11 December 1998 in Buenos Aires, Argentina) was an Argentine tango singer. In 1945, he joined the Florindo Sassone orchestra – in 1949, Alfredo Gobbi, then Ángel D'Agostino (es), and in 1950, Horacio Salgán, where he remained until 1956. Díaz composed songs and collaborated with many others.
