= Mis cinco hijos =

- Directed by: Orestes Caviglia; Bernardo Spoliansky
- Written by: Nathán Pinzón; Ricardo Setaro
- Produced by: Movyart
- Starring: Tito Alonso; Pola Alonso; Iris Alonso; Domingo Sapelli; Ilde Pirovano
- Edited by: Jacobo Spoliansky
- Music by: Juan Ehlert
- Release date: 2 September 1948
- Running time: 85 minutes
- Country: Argentina
- Language: Spanish

Mis cinco hijos is a 1948 Argentine film of the classical era of Argentine cinema, directed by Orestes Caviglia and Bernardo Spoliansky and written by Nathán Pinzón and Ricardo Setaro. It was premiered on September 2, 1948.

== Cast ==
- Tito Alonso
- Pola Alonso
- Iris Alonso
- Mario Alonso
- Héctor Alonso
- Ilde Pirovano
- Horacio Priani
- Mario Giusti
- Dora del Río
- Roberto Durán
- Juan Ramón Alberti
- Pablo Cumo
- Juan Carrara
- Roberto Chanel
- Rafael Chumbito
- Rodolfo Crespi
- Carlos Escobares
- Rubén Hernández
- Alberto Morán
- Pedro Pompillo
- Osvaldo Pugliese
- Domingo Sapelli
- Ricardo Trigo
