= Rodolfo Galé =

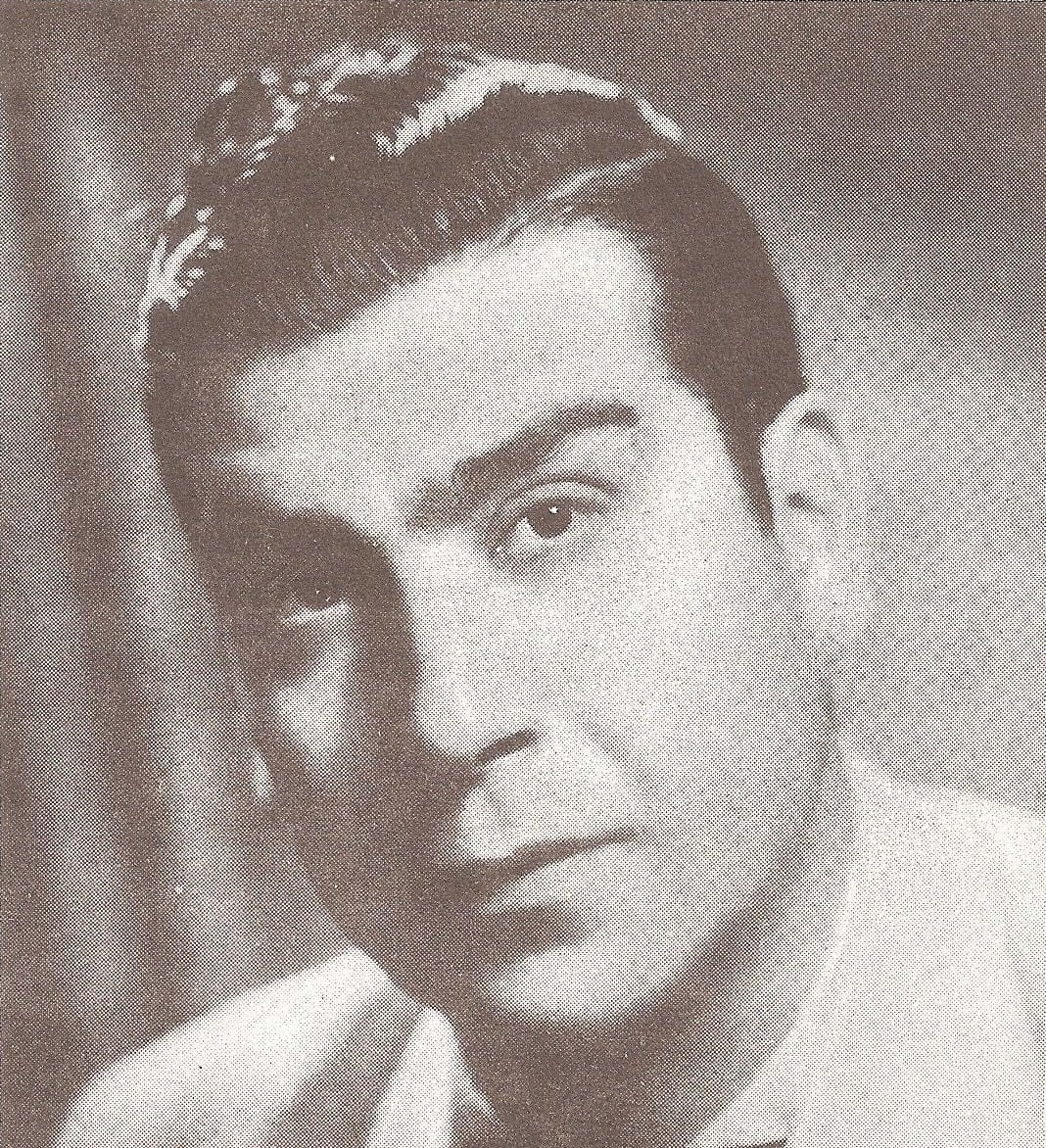

Background information
- Born: Juan Dionisio Tobares Galletti; 26 December 1928 (age 97); Mendoza, Argentina
- Died: 25 October 1972 (aged 43)
- Genre: Tango
- Occupation: Tango singer
- Years active: 1945–1972

Juan Dionisio Tobares Galletti, better known by his stage name Rodolfo Galé (26 December 1928 – 25 October 1972) was an Argentine tango singer.

He stood out for his baritone-range voice, with a deep and powerful tone. Much of his career took place during the 1950s, when he performed as a singer in tango orchestras led by figures such as Florindo Sassone, José Basso, and Carlos Di Sarli. Later, he was also part of the orchestras of Roberto Caló and Francisco Canaro.

Throughout his career, he performed numerous classic tangos and waltzes, becoming part of the so-called "Golden Age" of Argentine tango.

== Life ==
Rodolfo Galé was born on December 26, 1928, in the city of Mendoza, Argentina. He was orphaned at a young age and was raised by his older sisters. From a very young age, he showed an interest in music and singing, especially tango.

At the age of 15, he won a new voices contest in Mendoza by performing the tango Melodía de arrabal, which encouraged his artistic vocation.

In 1945, he joined the orquesta típica of bandoneonist Aníbal Appiolaza in Mendoza, and in 1947 he moved to Córdoba to sing in the ensemble led by Torcuato Wermuth. In 1949, he arrived in Buenos Aires, where he performed live acts in city cinemas accompanied by guitars.

== Professional career ==
At the beginning of the 1950s, Galé joined the tango orchestra of Florindo Sassone. Due to the resignation of singers Roberto Chanel and Raúl Lavalle, Galé was brought in as the sole vocalist of that ensemble in 1951.

On May 30, 1951, he recorded his first album with the Sassone orchestra for the RCA Victor label: the tango Testamento de arrabal, with music by Oscar Castagniaro and lyrics by Raúl Hormaza. Throughout that year, he recorded other notable tracks such as Íntimas and Trago amargo. In total, along with singer Jorge Casal, he was one of the most prolific performers of the Sassone orchestra, with sixteen recordings for the Victor company.

In 1953, he joined José Basso's orchestra, replacing Jorge Durán, at the suggestion of singer Oscar Ferrari. With Basso, he recorded several tracks for the Odeon label, including the famous tango Cuesta abajo. In the following years, he also recorded works such as Patoteros, Doblando el codo, and the waltz Eras como la flor, solidifying his career as an orchestra singer.

In the second half of 1955, he was recruited by Carlos di Sarli when the maestro completely renewed his orchestra. In 1956, he recorded two tangos with Di Sarli that became classics: Noche de locura (music by Manuel Sucher and Carlos Bahr) and the waltz Mala yerba (music by Arturo Gallucci and Abel Aznar). These recordings were made for RCA Victor and are representative pieces of his repertoire.

In 1957, Galé joined Roberto Caló's orchestra, alongside singer Héctor De Rosas. During 1957 and 1958, he recorded numerous tracks with Caló, standing out the duet Limosna de amor (with Héctor de Rosas) and the waltzes Mi colegialaand Si vos no me querés. He also recorded at that time the zamba Luna tucumana (by Atahualpa Yupanqui), as well as songs he sang solo, such as Y con eso ¿dónde voy? and Mañana seré feliz.

In 1959, he was invited by Francisco Canaro to perform in theaters, dances, and on the radio with his orchestra. However, that year Galé suffered severe chest pains and was advised by a cardiologist to temporarily step away from singing. Due to his financial needs, he could not retire completely and continued touring the interior of the country.

== Recordings ==
Rodolfo Galé recorded numerous pieces that are now considered classics of tango and waltz. Among his best-known performances are the tangos Testamento de arrabal and Trago amargo (with Florindo Sassone), Cuesta abajo and Doblando el codo (with José Basso), and Noche de locura and Mala yerba (with Carlos Di Sarli). Popular waltzes such as Mi colegiala and Si vos no me querés (recorded with Roberto Caló) are also part of his discography. Many of these recordings are included in later compilations dedicated to the Golden Age of tango.

== Death ==
Rodolfo Galé died suddenly on October 25, 1972, due to a heart attack, shortly before turning 44 years old.

His death was mourned in the tango community. The singer Oscar Ferrari, Galé's orchestra partner, described him as "the brother I never had," highlighting his humanity and loyal friendship.
