= Jorge Maciel (singer) =

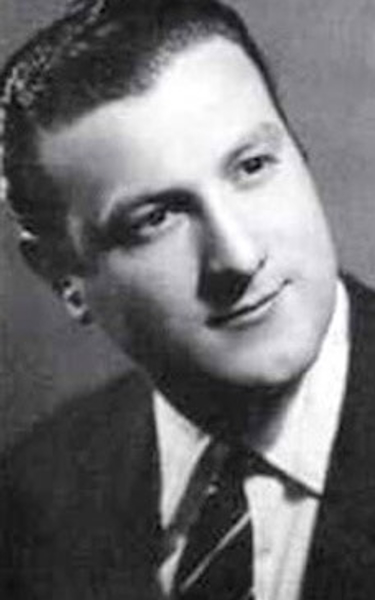
- Jorge Maciel

Background information
- Also known as: Jorge Maciel
- Born: Carlos Pellegrini; 17 September 1920; Buenos Aires, Argentina
- Origin: Argentina
- Died: 25 February 1975 (aged 54) Buenos Aires, Argentina
- Genres: Tango
- Occupation: Singer
- Years active: 1940–1975

Carlos Pellegrini (September 1920 – 25 February 1975), better known by his stage name Jorge Maciel, was an Argentine tango singer, known for his work with the orchestras of Alfredo Gobbi and Osvaldo Pugliese.

His style was characterized by a lyrical voice, clear diction, and expressiveness, which earned him the nickname "The Caruso of tango", in reference to Enrico Caruso.

== Life ==
=== Early years ===
He was born in the neighborhood of La Boca, in Buenos Aires. He began his musical career in the 1940s, performing as a vocalist in orchestras, including those of Juan Carlos Caviello, Miguel Zabala, Félix Guillán, and Roberto Caló.

=== Professional career ===
In 1947, he joined Alfredo Gobbi's orchestra, with which he recorded around 18 tracks. One of the most notable was Remembranza (1948), which marked his first major hit. He also recorded other tangos such as Canzoneta, Sombras, El pollero, and La intriga.

In 1954, he joined Osvaldo Pugliese’s orquesta típica, with which he worked for over a decade. He recorded more than 60 tracks, many as duets with other singers such as Miguel Montero, Carlos Guido, Alfredo Belusi, and Abel Córdoba. Among his most notable performances are El pañuelito, Esta noche de luna, Un tango para el recuerdo, La novia del suburbio, Mamita, Dos amores, and El adiós.

He took part in several international tours with Pugliese's orchestra. In 1959, he was part of the tour through the Soviet Union and China, and in 1966 he traveled to Japan, where he brought Argentine tango to international stages.

In 1968, he joined the Sexteto Tango, a group formed by musicians close to Pugliese, such as Emilio Balcarce, Julián Plaza, and Osvaldo Ruggiero. With this ensemble, he recorded at least 24 tracks.

He died in Buenos Aires on February 25, 1975, at the age of 54.

== See also ==
- Tango
- Orquesta típica
- Alfredo Gobbi
- Osvaldo Pugliese
- Sexteto Tango
