= José Basso =

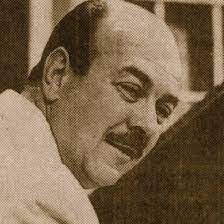
- José Basso

Background information
- Also known as: Pepe
- Born: José Hipólito Basso; 30 January 1919; Pergamino, Argentina
- Origin: Argentina
- Died: 14 August 1993 (aged 74)
- Genres: Tango
- Occupations: Pianist, musician
- Instrument: Piano

José Hipólito Basso (30 January 1919 – 14 August 1993) was an Argentine conductor, composer, and pianist.

== Professional career ==
Born in Pergamino, Buenos Aires, he began his career in the orchestra of Emilio and José de Caro in 1936. Then, in 1937, he joined Francisco Grillo's group as a pianist.

In 1938, he formed the musical group Gallardo, Ayala, Basso, and later played in the orchestras of Antonio Bonavena and Anselmo Aieta.

In 1943, he joined Aníbal Troilo's orchestra and was Pichuco's pianist until 1947, the year he began his career with his own orchestra.

His first singers were the duo Ortega del Cerro and Ricardo Ruiz. In 1949, the singer Francisco Fiorentino joined, replacing Ortega del Cerro. That same year, he recorded for Odeon the songs Claveles blancos, sung by Ricardo Ruiz, and El bulín de la calle Ayacucho, with Fiorentino on vocals. Shortly afterward, Fiorentino and Ricardo Ruiz left the orchestra—the former to sing with Alberto Mancione's orchestra and Ruiz to join Ángel D'Agostino's. To replace them, he hired Jorge Durán and Oscar Ferrari.

Also part of his orchestra were the singers Rodolfo Galé, Alfredo Belusi, Héctor De Rosas, Juan Carlos Godoy, Aníbal Jaulé, Eduardo Borda, Alicia Randal, and many more.

In 1967, he went on a highly successful tour of Japan, returning in 1970 with singers Alfredo Belusi, Alicia Randal, and Carlos Rossi.

In the 1950s, 1960s, 1970s, and 1980s, he made appearances on Argentine television.

In 1985, he received the Konex Award – Diploma of Merit in the category of Best Orquesta típica Conductor.

== As a composer ==
Pepe Basso was the composer of the instrumental pieces Once y uno, Pecachi, Brazo de oro, De diez siete, and El pulga; the waltzes Celeste lluvia and Nuestro vals; and the milonga La camalela.

His interpretations of Astor Piazzolla's tangos—Adiós Nonino, Contratiempo, Para lucirse, and Prepárense—are well remembered.

He also composed Milonga para los orientales with Jorge Luis Borges.
