= Roberto Caló =

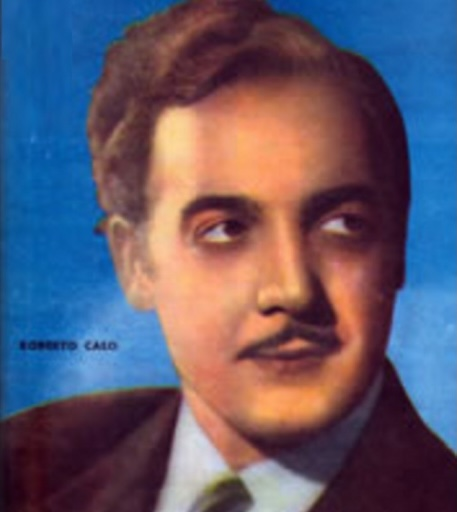
- Roberto Caló

Background information
- Born: Francisco Caló; April 26, 1913; Buenos Aires, Argentina
- Died: April 26, 1985 (aged 72) Buenos Aires, Argentina
- Genres: Tango
- Occupations: Musician, pianist, orchestra conductor, composer, singer, actor
- Instrument: Piano
- Years active: 1913–1985

Roberto Caló (26 April 1913 – 26 April 1985) was an Argentine pianist, orchestra conductor, composer, and tango singer whose real name was Francisco Caló.

== Family background ==
He was born at 284 Alberti Street, his parents were José Caló and Natalicia Pantano. He was the third of five brothers, all of them musicians: Miguel, Juan, Salvador, Antonio, and Armando. From a young age, he studied piano and singing. His brother Miguel became the most well-known, as a bandoneonist and conductor. Juan was also a bandoneon player and eventually settled in the United States. Antonio and Armando formed the jazz group Tony-Armand, and Salvador, under the stage name Freddy, settled in Miami.

== Professional career ==
Just a teenager, he made his debut as a refrain singer in the orchestra led by his brother Juan, which performed on Radio La Nación.

In 1933, he debuted as a soloist on Radio Stentor. Later, he performed on Radio Prieto and Radio París. In 1935, Jaime Yankelevich hired him, and for three years he performed on Radio Porteña, then on Radio Mitre, and finally on Radio Belgrano, which at that time was the most prestigious radio station.

At the end of 1938, he joined as a singer, replacing Alberto Morel in his brother Miguel's orchestra—who by then was already a respected figure in tango—and in which his brother Armando played the double bass. With that orchestra, on December 21, 1938, he recorded the tango Dulce amargura and the foxtrot Luces del puerto.

In 1941, he formed a duo with his brother Juan, who was a bandoneonist, but it dissolved after a year. It was then that Roberto Caló toured the United States and various Latin American countries, singing while accompanying himself on the piano.

Upon returning in 1945, he left singing to focus on orchestra conducting and debuted on LR4 Radio Splendid. In April of the following year, he moved to Radio Belgrano with his orchestra, which had incorporated—although for a short period—two already established singers: Enrique Campos, who had left Ricardo Tanturi’s orchestra, and Carlos Roldán, who had done the same from Francisco Canaro’s orchestra.

In 1947, he toured the interior of Argentina and Uruguay with his new singer Hugo del Cerro. In Buenos Aires, they performed at the Dancing Empire on Avenida Corrientes near the corner of Esmeralda. The excellent pianist Julio Medovoy was in charge of the musical arrangements, and at the end of the following year, singers Oscar Larroca and Roberto Ray joined the orchestra; they performed on Radio Belgrano, and shortly after, Ray returned to work with Osvaldo Fresedo. In 1949, the orchestra, which featured Alberto Santillán singing alongside Larroca, performed on Radio Splendid.

His first recording was in 1951 for the Orfeo label, featuring the tango El metejón sung by Larroca and the instrumental Selección de Aníbal Troilo, with arrangements by Julio Medovoy. Shortly after, Larroca left to join Alfredo De Angelis’s orchestra to replace Julio Martel, and his place was taken by Carlos Rivera, whose voice Caló used to record the famous tango Zorro gris. With the voice of singer Carlos Roldán, who returned for a short time, Caló's orchestra recorded in 1952 the milonga Soy una fiera by Francisco Martino, Cualquier cosa by Juan Miguel Velich and his daughter Herminia, and Victoria by Enrique Santos Discépolo. At the end of that year, Alberto Santillán, who had been the singer of Víctor D’Amario's orchestra, joined, and they recorded Nostalgias by Juan Carlos Cobián with lyrics by Enrique Cadícamo, Después que te perdí, a tango by Caló himself and Horacio Sanguinetti, and the waltz Manos adoradas.

In 1953, he accompanied the singer Azucena Maizani with his orchestra in recordings for the Orfeo label when she returned to recording after eleven years. That same year, he recorded several songs, including Con la otra and Canzonetawith the voice of Enrique Campos, who was returning to the orchestra. They performed on Radio Splendid, at Café Marzotto, and in the Les Ambassadeurs hall on Avenida Figueroa Alcorta during the Carnival dances. In 1956, singer Roberto Rufino joined the orchestra, although for a short time, as he reappeared after a break in his career. They immediately recorded for RCA Victor the tangos Ladrillo by Juan de Dios Filiberto and Juan Caruso, and Soñemos by Roberto Caló and Reynaldo Yiso, which was a huge success and led them to perform on Radio El Mundo and at two of the most important cabarets of the time: the Marabú on Maipú Street and the Chantecler at Paraná and Avenida Corrientes.

For the 1957 Carnival dances, Rufino was no longer with the orchestra, so Caló hired singers Héctor De Rosas and Rodolfo Galé, to whom Tito Reyes was added shortly after as a third singer. At that time, Roberto Caló's orchestra was more in demand than his brother Miguel's; they worked very successfully at the Richmond café on Esmeralda Street and recorded, among others, Si vos no me querés, Limosna de amor, and Luna Tucumana with duets by Galé and De Rosas, and Frente a un espejo, Nápoles de mi amor, and Tango argentino with Tito Reyes. At the end of 1957, the group accompanied Aída Denis in her recordings for RCA Victor, and in December, the remarkable pianist and arranger Osvaldo Tarantino joined the orchestra, replacing Osvaldo Berlingieri, who had left the group to start working on September 24, 1957, with Aníbal Troilo. In mid-1958, singer Galé retired. Roberto Caló decided to dissolve the orchestra, and Tito Reyes, along with most of the musicians, joined his brother Miguel's orchestra, while Roberto devoted himself to producing shows.

He died in Buenos Aires on April 26, 1985, the same day he turned 72 years old.

== As an actor and composer ==
Roberto Caló appeared in several films: Giácomo (1939), Valle negro (1943), and Los ojos más lindos del mundo (1943). As a composer, he is the author of Soñemos, Te vi llegar, and the instrumentals Colores, En fa menor, and Flauteando.
