= İbrahim Özgür =

İbrahim Özgür (1910 – 11 February 1959) was a Turkish tango composer and singer.

== Early life ==
Özgür was born into a musical family in Ayazpasa, Istanbul. Özgür learned clarinet and saxophone at the Military Academy in Ankara when he was 16.

== Career ==
After graduation Özgür returned to Istanbul and formed his own orchestra. In 1931 Özgür embarked on a concert tour for seven years and performed in many East Asian countries such as India, Indonesia, and Singapore. Afterwards, Özgür went back to Turkey and opened a nightclub called “Ates Boceklen”, which means “Glow-worm” in English. Later in 1938, Özgür made his first recording.

He wrote many famous tangos full of nostalgia. His best-known tango, “Mavi Kelebek”, was inspired by an Indian princess whom he met.
