= General Manuel Campos =

Coordinates: 37°28′S 63°36′W

- Rural locality and village
- Interactive map of General Manuel Campos
- Country: Argentina
- Province: La Pampa Province
- Time zone: UTC−3 (ART)

General Manuel Campos is a village and rural locality (municipality) in La Pampa Province in Argentina.
