= Pintín Castellanos =

Uruguayan pianist, composer, lyricist

Horacio Antonio Castellanos Alves (Montevideo, 1905 – Montevideo, 1983), better known as Pintín Castellanos, was an Uruguayan pianist, composer, lyricist and conductor of tango music. He was recognized as one of the great tango composers from Uruguay, enjoying success throughout a long career. The song "La puñalada" was his greatest creation. Recorded as a milonga for the first time in 1937 by Juan D'Arienzo, the song sold 20 million copies.
