= Alfredo Belusi =

Argentine tango musician

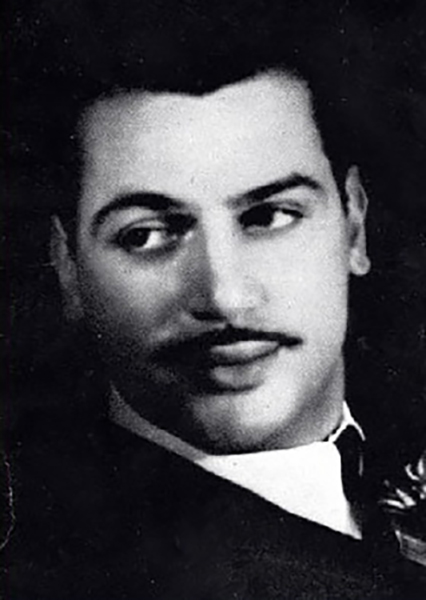
- Alfredo Belusi

Background information
- Birth name: Alfredo Belusi
- Born: January 10, 1925; Los Quirquinchos, Argentina
- Origin: Argentina
- Died: January 1, 2001 (aged 75); Buenos Aires, Argentina
- Genres: Tango
- Occupation: Cantante
- Instrument: Voz

Alfredo Belusi (born Alfredo Belluschi, Los Quirquinchos, Santa Fe, 10 January 1925 - Buenos Aires, 1 January 2001) was an Argentine tango musician.

His works at José Basso's and Osvaldo Pugliese's Orchestras were notable, including songs 'Bronca', 'Se tiran conmigo', 'De puro curda' (by Carlos Olmedo and Abel Aznar) and 'Y no le erré'.

He died from stroke on 1 January 2001.
