= La yumba =

La yumba (zhoóm-ba) is a tango created by Osvaldo Pugliese in 1946.

The term yumba - despite its indigenous origin - was not chosen by Pugliese for its etymology but for its onomatopoeic similarity with the profound gasping from a bandoneón - and the resulting mixture of that sound with other orchestra arrangements.

Pugliese declared that the unrelenting rhythm was inspired by the noises of metalworking. The tango has been a dance favorite, and remains Pugliese's signature tune.

The tango was performed in Buenos Aires' Teatro Colón on December 26, 1985 during the Osvaldo Pugliese's 80th anniversary. It was also featured in the 1985 film El exilio de Gardel directed by Fernando Solanas (where Pugliese's orchestra performs live), and in the 1997 film, The Tango Lesson, directed by Sally Potter.

The tune was featured on the fourteenth season of the hit show Dancing with the Stars, in which the tune was performed in the semifinals to an Argentine tango danced by Maria Menounos and Derek Hough, for which they received perfect score 30 out of 30 from the judges (though they were eliminated on the same week).
