= Florindo Sassone =

Argentine violinist and composer

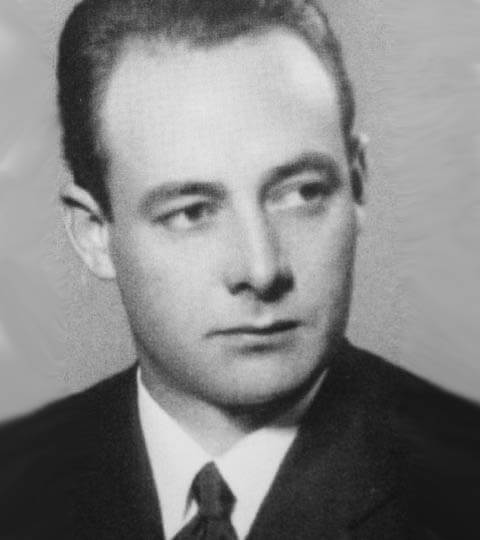
- Florindo Sassone

Background information
- Born: Pedro Florindo Sassone; January 12, 1912 (age 113); Buenos Aires, Argentina
- Died: January 31, 1982 (aged 70) Buenos Aires, Argentina
- Genres: Tango
- Occupation(s): Composer, violinist, orchestra conductor
- Instrument: Violin
- Labels: RCA Victor, Odeon

Pedro Florindo Sassone (12 January 1912 – 31 January 1982) was an Argentine violinist and composer, leader of his eponymous orchestra, which played tango music, from the 1940s up to the 1970s.

== Life ==
Sassone was born in Liniers, Buenos Aires, son of Carlos María and Luisa Cosso de Sassone.

He had a notable career in the 1930s, though without advertising success and without recording. His reappearance in mid-1946 marked the beginning of his successful career.

After graduating as a violin teacher, he made his professional debut in a group led by Antonio Polito, which performed on Radio Belgrano. The following year, he made a major leap, becoming a violinist in Roberto Firpo’s orchestra.

In 1935, he formed his first orchestra, debuting on January 1, 1936, on Radio Belgrano. He performed at Café El Nacional—known as the “Cathedral of Tango” on Corrientes Street—and at the cabaret Marabú, located at Maipú 359, featuring the voice of Alberto Amor, who was making his professional debut at 19 years old. Later, Sassone moved to Radio El Mundo, where he hosted a daily noon show with a large orchestra that included percussion, harp, and other exotic instruments.

He began recording for RCA Victor in 1947. During his time with the label, his vocalists included Jorge Casal, Ángel Díaz, Roberto Chanel, Carlos Malbrán, Raúl Lavalle, and Rodolfo Galé.

In 1959, Sassone moved to Odeon, featuring different vocalists and placing more emphasis on instrumental recordings. Starting in 1971, he rotated among various labels: Carmusic, País, Music Hall, Embassy, and Microfón.

When Casal wanted to join Aníbal Troilo’s orchestra, Sassone appealed to the Argentine Musicians’ Union because his orchestra had a signed contract to perform during the 1950 Carnival dances. As a result, Jorge Casal had to fulfill those performances before joining Aníbal Troilo’s orchestra.

In 1960, Osvaldo De Santi left Alberto Mancione’s orchestra and joined Florindo Sassone’s, performing on LR1 Radio El Mundo and television channels 7 and 11 (in the show Así canta Buenos Aires). During that decade, Sassone had his own program, where he was the star attraction.

By 1962, the orchestra had an exceptional lineup: Osvaldo Requena on piano; Pastor Cores, Carlos Pazos, Jesús Méndez, and Daniel Lomuto on bandoneons; Roberto Guisado, Claudio González, Carlos Arnaiz, Domingo Mancuso, Juan Scafino, and José Amatriain on violins; and Enrique Marcheto on double bass.

In 1966, he traveled to Japan, performing for several months in its major cities. For that tour, Mario Bustos was his singer. Six years later, he returned to Japan, this time with singer Luciano Bianco.

In 1957 and 1971, he composed music for the milonga Baldosa floja, collaborating with Julio Bocazzi, and for the tango El último escalón, both with lyrics by Dante Gilardoni. As a composer, he also created instrumental tangos such as El relámpago, Cancha, and with Mazzea: Rivera Sud, Bolívar y Chile, Tango caprichoso, Esquina gardeliana, among others. Through the singer from the Litoral region, Ramona Galarza, he was introduced to singer Zulema Robles, with whom he recorded the tango Madreselva on April 28, 1970.

He visited Colombia and Venezuela in 1975, and in Caracas, he performed with an Argentine artistic delegation. At that time, his singers were Oscar Macri and Rodolfo Lemos. He later toured Porto Alegre in Brazil and Asunción, the capital of Paraguay.

His discography occasionally features his Sexteto Don Florindo, through which he recreated compositions in the style of the Guardia Vieja (Old Guard).

He was married for several decades to his wife, María, and died in Buenos Aires on January 31, 1982, at the age of 70.

== Discography ==
- A Night in Buenos Aires, Capitol Records (stereophonic) (recorded in Argentina)
- Bien milonguero Vol. 1
- Bien milonguero Vol. 2
- Dancing tango
- Florindo Sassone Con Sus Cantores: 1947–1950, featuring Angel Roberto Chanel
- Florindo Sassone y sus cantores 1947/1956 Archivo RCA
- From Argentina to the world
- Grandes Del Tango 46
- Grandes Tangos Argentinos
- La última cita 1947–1953, with Jorge Casal, Roberto Chanel
- RCA Club
- Vol. 08. – Florindo Sassone y su orquesta – Años '47 / '51
- Tangos De Oro Florindo Sassone y sus gran orquesta
- Tango Internacional, recorded in 1971, copyright 1998
