= Alberto Morán =

Argentine tango musician

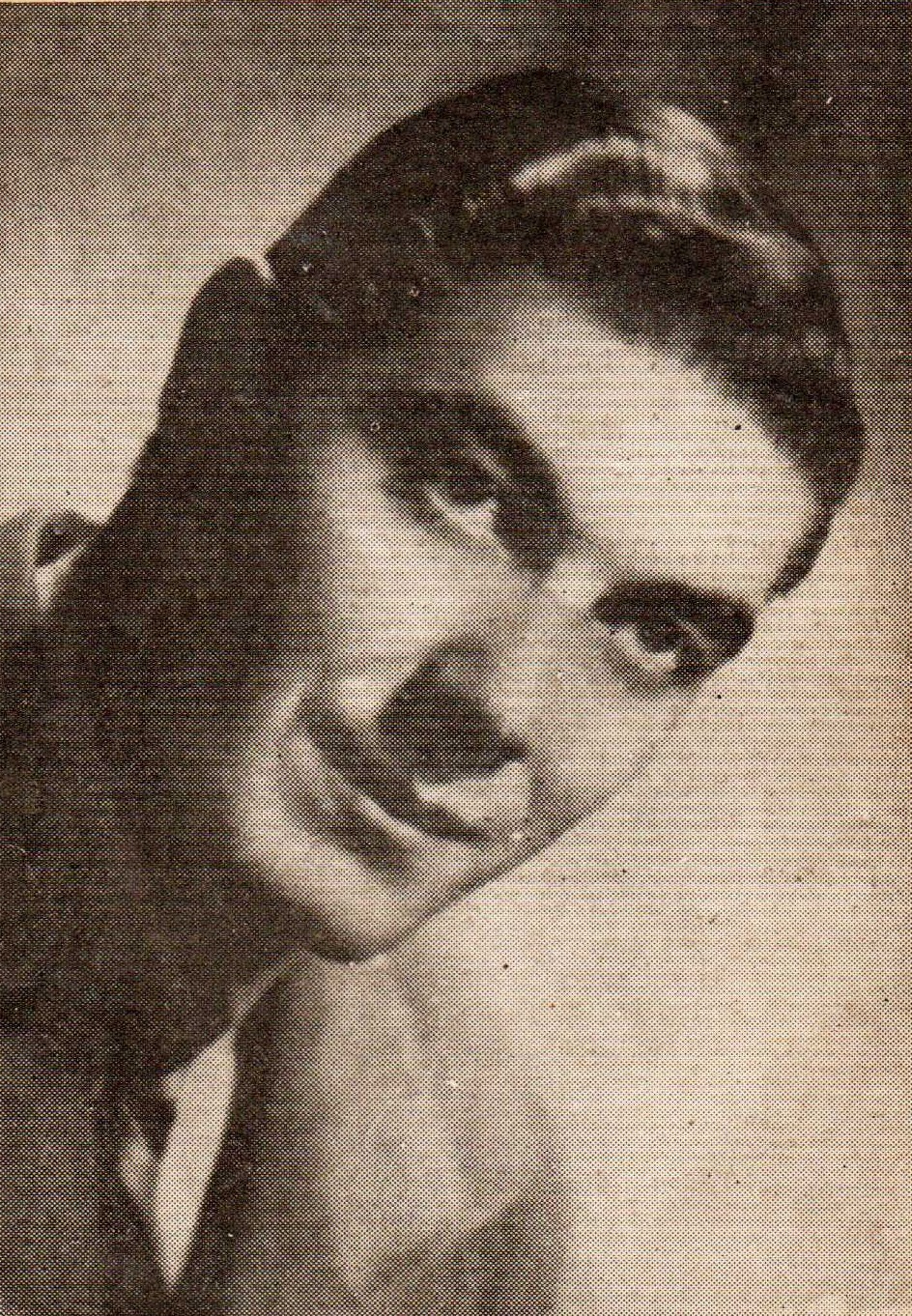
- Alberto Morán

Background information
- Born: 15 March 1922; Strevi, Italia
- Died: 16 August 1997 (aged 75) Buenos Aires, Argentina
- Genre: Tango
- Occupation: Singer

Alberto Morán (born Remo Andrea Domenico Recagno, Strevi, Alessandria, Italy, 15 March 1922 – Buenos Aires, 16 August 1997) was an Argentine tango musician. His works at Osvaldo Pugliese's Orchestras were notable, including songs 'Pasional', 'San José de Flores' and 'El abrojito'.

In 1958, Morán guest-starred in an episode of the CBS situation comedy Mr. Adams and Eve. He died in 1997.
