= Alfredo Gobbi =

Argentine musician (1912–1965)

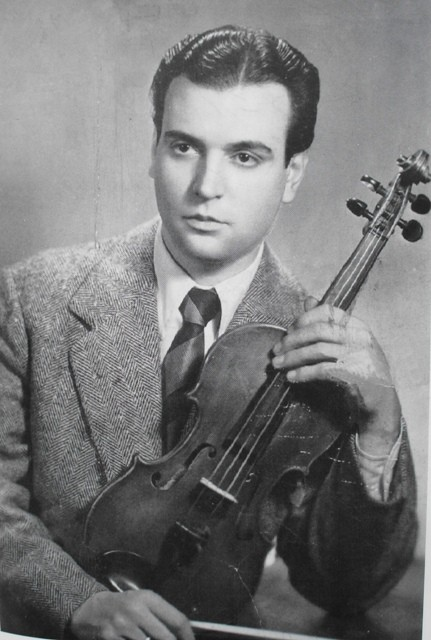
- Gobbi c. 1945

Background information
- Birth name: Alfredo Julio Floro Gobbi
- Born: 14 May 1912; Paris, France
- Died: 21 May 1965 (aged 53); Buenos Aires, Argentina
- Genres: Tango
- Instruments: Violin; piano

Alfredo Julio Floro Gobbi (14 May 1912 – 21 May 1965) was a violin player, composer and bandleader in Argentina during the golden age of tango. He was known as the romantic violin of the tango (Spanish: el violín romántico del tango).

== Early life ==
Alfredo Gobbi was born in París, France, while his parents where working there as variety artists—his father was Alfredo Eusebio Gobbi and his baptismal godfather was Ángel Villoldo. Before his first birthday, they returned to Buenos Aires, where Gobbi spent his youth in Villa Ortúzar. He studied piano from the age of six with the tutor Natalio Carmini, and at the age of ten he began practising the violin and became recognised for his skill.

== Career ==
At 13 years of age, Gobbi debuted at a bar in Chacarita, in an ensemble with his friend Orlando Goñi and bandoneón player Domingo Triguero.

In 1926 he composed his first tango, Perro fiel, and the next year it was played by the orchestra of the Teatro Nuevo, conducted by Antonio Lozzi. In 1929 he temporarily switched to playing the piano, playing in the evenings of the 'Metropol'. Later, he played in the orchestras of Juan Maglio Pacho, Roberto Firpo, Tirigall, Manuel Buzón, Anselmo Aieta, Pardo, with whom he released his tango Desvelo, Avile, and Antonio Rodio.

When Gobbi played with the orchestra of Manuel Buzón, he met the pianists Orlando Goñi and Jaime Gosis. They left to form a sextet along with Aníbal Troilo and Alfredo Attadia on bandoneons, José Goñi on second violin, and Agustín Furchi on double bass. Later Gobbi would join a duo with Osvaldo Pugliese, the Pedro Laurenz orchestra in which he was first violin, and the orchestras of Joaquín Do Reyes, Balliot and in Montevideo that of Pintín Castellanos.

At the same time, he composed a number of works, including Desvelo (1928), Mi paloma, De punta y hacha (1930) y Cavilando, El andariego (a homage to his father) — which placed him in the most celebrated composers of his generation. In 1942 he formed his first orchestra, which debuted in the Sans Souci cabaret. Gobbi conducted and played the violin alongside the pianist Juan Olivero Pro, bandoneonists Deolindo Casaux, Toto D'Amario, Mario Demarco and Ernesto Rodríguez, double bassist Juan José Fantin, violinists Bernardo Hermino and Antonio Blanco, and the singers Julio Lucero (the pseudonym of Osvaldo Ribó), Walter Cabral, and Pablo Lozano.

In 1945, he debuted on the radio, and in May 1947 he made his first recording with Vicente Greco's La viruta, and a waltz written by his father, La entrerriana, sung as a duo by Carlos Heredia and Hugo Soler, for the label RCA Victor. This began a discography that lasted until 1957, and which Gobbi's style of playing the tango is most clearly articulated. As well as conducting his orchestra and playing his instrument, Gobbi was also the arranger of the ensemble.

Although Gobbi's musical style initially expressed similarities to that of Carlos Di Sarli, as can be heard in the recordings of La viruta by Di Sarli and Gobbi in 1943 and 1947 respectively, he later developed his own style related to that of Julio de Caro. Although Gobbi had less academic training than de Caro, he incorporated and enhanced many of the tango effects of his violin playing in his own.

Gobbi died in Buenos Aires on 21 May 1965. He was survived by his wife Flora Rodríguez.

== Filmography ==
- Barranca abajo (1937)
- Amalia (1936)
- Loco lindo (1936)
