= Osvaldo Pugliese =

Argentine tango composer, pianist and arranger

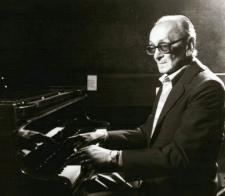
- Osvaldo Pugliese playing the piano

Background information
- Born: Osvaldo Pedro Pugliese; December 2, 1905; Buenos Aires, Argentina
- Died: July 25, 1995 (aged 89) Buenos Aires, Argentina
- Genres: Tango, milonga, vals
- Occupations: Musician, composer, arranger
- Instrument: piano
- Years active: 1924–1995
- Label: EMI Odeon

Osvaldo Pedro Pugliese (December 2, 1905 – July 25, 1995) was an Argentine tango musician. He developed dramatic arrangements that retained strong elements of the walking beat of salon tango but also heralded the development of concert-style tango music. Some of his music, mostly since the 1950s, is used for theatrical dance performances. In Buenos Aires, Pugliese is often played later in the evening when the dancers want to dance more slowly, impressionistically and intimately.

== Personal life ==
His father, Don Adolfo Pugliese (1877–1945), pushed him to work harder; his mother, Aurelia Terragno (1880–1947), often whispered to her son while he was practicing, ¡Al Colón! (To the Colón!), referring to Buenos Aires' famous Teatro Colón, where only the country's finest artists play. His other brothers Adolfo Vicente and Alberto Roque were violinists. He was married two times, to María Concepción Florio and to Lydia Elman. His first wife died in 1971, and he had one daughter, Lucela Delma "Beba" Pugliese (b. 1939), a pianist in her own right.

== Orquesta Osvaldo Pugliese ==
In 1918 he left primary school to work as a print graphic artist. His father finally convinced him to take classes with the teacher Antonio D'Agostino, at the Conservatorio Odeon.

He wrote his first tango, Recuerdo, in 1924, when he was 19. Two years later, when it was finally recorded, it became a classic. 'La yumba' (1946) is another famous and most popular Pugliese's tangos compositions.

In 1939 he formed his orchestra as a cooperative and made his debut at Café El Nacional (980 Corrientes Avenue – "Cathedral of Tango") on 11 August 1939.

The orchestra toured the former Soviet Union in 1959 (eighty cities in three months – sometimes playing two or three shows a day) and also China (twenty-eight cities in another month), Chile (1990), Mexico, Columbia (1980), Peru, Cuba (1984, 1988, 1992), Japan (1965, 135 shows in five months; 1979, 1989), the U.S. (stopping in Chicago in 1979), the Middle East, France (1984), Portugal, Spain (1985; 1988 playing in Madrid, at Teatro Albéniz with the singer Joan Manuel Serrat, and Barcelona), Belgium, The Netherlands (with Astor Piazzolla in Amsterdam, 29 June 1989), Finland and almost all South and Central American countries: Uruguay (1987, Solís Theatre in Montevideo). For his work the maestro received high cultural distinctions, including from the Argentine, French and Cuban governments.

=== Teatro Colón concert (1985) ===
At age 80, he was allowed on 26 December 1985 to give a concert at the Teatro Colón, in Buenos Aires. He received 5 standing ovations. With characteristic humility he said: “The truth is... it’s a night of the people, of the masses, lovers of our genre, our beloved genre, tango.” The ceremony was led by Luis Brandoni and Héctor Larrea. The orchestra's members that night were: Roberto Álvarez, Alejandro Previgniano, Fabio Lapinta (bandoneons), Osvaldo Montermi, Fernando Rodríguez, Diego Lerendegui, Gabriel Rivas (violins), Merei Brain (Viola), Amílcar Tolosa (double bass) and Osvaldo Pugliese (piano).

List of songs that were played:

1. “Arrabal”.
2. “Los mareados”.
3. “Después” (Abel Cordoba).
4. “Quinto año” (Adrian Guida).
5. “Chacabuqueando”.
6. “A Evaristo Carriego”.
7. “Melodía de arrabal” (Abel Cordoba).
8. “Almagro” (Adrián Guida).
9. “Recuerdo”.
10. “Chiqué”.
11. “Mala junta”.
12. “La canción de Buenos Aires” (Abel Cordoba).
13. “Contame una historia” (Adrián Guida).
14. “Copacabana”.
15. “Protocoleando”.
16. “Milonga para Gardel” (Adrián Guida, Abel Cordoba).
17. “Desde el alma”.
18. “La yumba”.
19. “La mariposa”.
20. "Toda mi vida".
21. "El encopao".

“La yumba” was played with his old orchestra members:

- Oscar Herrero, violin (1943–1978).
- Jorge Bruschi, violin (1980–1983).
- Kike Lano, violocelist (1963–1973).
- Silvio Pucci, violocelist (1973–1983).
- Norberto Bernasconi, viola (1954–1978).
- Alcides Rossi, contrabass (1970–1978).
- Oscar Castagnaro, bandoneon (1943–1951).
- Ismael Spitalnik, bandoneon (1956–1971).
- Arturo Penón, bandoneon (1961–1984).
- Julián Plaza, bandoneon (1959–1968).
- Osvaldo Ruggiero, bandoneon (1939–1968).
- Victor Lavallén, bandoneon (1959–1968).
- Daniel Binelli, bandoneon (1968–1982).

== Tango compositions ==
The most famous tango composition of Osvaldo Pugliese are: Recuerdo (1924), Ausencia (Tango mío) (1931), El frenopático, Primera categoría, El encopao (1942), Recién (1943), Adiós Bardi (1944), Una vez (1946), Igual que una sombra (1946), La yumba, Negracha (1948), Malandraca (1949), Milonga para Fidel (1961), Para Eduardo Arolas.

The first recording of "Recuerdo" was by the Julio De Caro orchestra, on December 9, 1926, in instrumental form. In 1927 the female singer Rosita Montemar recorded it sung for the first time, with the accompaniment of musicians from the Víctor label. The Bianco-Bachicha orchestra recorded it instrumentally in Paris in 1928. And in 1930, the Orquesta Típica Victor, with the voice of Roberto Díaz. All labels feature A. Pugliese. And even more, it still appears like this on the RCA-Víctor 39776 album, from Ricardo Tanturi's version of 1942.

The famous tango "Recuerdo – a los amigos" was composed by Puglise in the honor of his friends: Torcuato Di Giorgio, Amadeo Pioriello, Alfredo Bianchi, Jose Tonareeli & Rogelio Boisselier.

Pugliese had composed the immortal Recuerdo in 1924 – “a tango for the year 3000”, according to Julio De Caro, who premiered it in 1927– and performed with Paquita Bernardo, Alfredo Gobbi (h) and Elvino Vardaro: he was not a stranger, but a popular musician who put together that initial orchestra as a cooperative.

== Political views ==
Pugliese was outspoken in his political opinions. His communist sympathies, though never violent, at times earned him the hostility of those in power.

“The exact reason why Osvaldo Pugliese was imprisoned the first time was never known, a fact that did not occur during the Perón government but before, in 1939, when he was preparing to debut with his orchestra at the inauguration of the new headquarters of the Communist Party”..."They wanted to punish the rebellion by imprisoning a prestigious figure on the left." according to the writer Enrique Medina. It is known: at the police station he was treated with respect, invited to drink mate in the officer's office and they went to look for “tortitas negras”, which he liked. After a few days, freedom, the expected debut now at the National Theater and the confession of the police that they had "felt honored to be with such an artist."

The idea of the red carnation on the piano was born: if Pugliese was in prison, the orchestra played the same, without a pianist. It has been said that it was proposed by Negro Mella, then presenter and reciter and later replaced by Eduardo Moreno, the author of the lyrics of Recuerdo. However, other testimonies –Petit de Murat, García Jiménez, Jauretche- pierced that story: yes, the carnation was placed on the piano, but many times Don Osvaldo appeared later, gave the flower to some lady in the audience.

He was a member of the Communist Party starting in 1936. He also managed to help create "Sociedad de Músicos y Artistas Afines" to increase job stability and wages for musicians.

In 1956, he was imprisoned by the dictatorship of the Revolución Libertadora in the so-called "Operation Cardenal", together with the entire Central Committee of the Communist Party. They were locked up in the ship "París", which was to be sunk with them inside. That night, Pugliese's orchestra had to appear on Radio Splendid, and they appeared without their conductor, and with a red carnation on the piano as a protest. The imprisonment of Rodolfo Ghioldi and Oreste Castronuovo, among other anonymous militants, in a Pugliese's ship, and the rumors that it was going to be sunk, generated so much commotion that they had to be released.

In 1961, he wrote Milonga Para Fidel to show his support for the Cuban revolution. When he was in jail, he still wrote arrangements and the orchestra still performed, and placed a red carnation on the keyboard of the piano in his honor.

The 1960s government of the late General Juan Carlos Onganía (who had a deep fear of Peronism and communists alike) simply banned Pugliese from radio broadcasts and public places.

Pugliese was a man of integrity and humility. He spent years in jail due to his beliefs. The government also restricted his recordings to 10 per year. As a communist, he organised his orchestra as a cooperative and paid his members by their contribution, earning their loyalty. Quite rare, his core orchestra members (Osvaldo Ruggiero 1st bandoneon, Enrique Camerano 1st violin, Julio Carrasco and Oscar Herrero 2nd violins, Alcides Rossi on double bass) stayed with him nearly 30 years (1939–1968).

In 1955 Pugliese was imprisoned in Devoto from January to July, and in that prison he was seen, with a mop and bucket, cleaning corridors, refusing to let other detainees take away that work.

Don Osvaldo was never an agitator, but a man with convictions who never confused art with ideology. It happened that in certain political stages of Argentina, due to his popularity, they considered him a "war booty".

At the end of 1973, a few months before Perón died, the founder of Justicialismo organized an artistic show to which he invited figures such as Horacio Guarany, Mercedes Sosa, Edmundo Rivero and Osvaldo Pugliese. The next noon there was a lunch in Olivos, and there Perón got up, went to Pugliese and extended his hand:

"I want to apologize, teacher, for those little matters that we had pending..."

The musician accepted the greeting and replied:

"Don't worry. Everything is already forgotten."

Perón looked him in the eye and raised his voice:

"Only greats like you know how to forgive."

== Death ==
He died after a short illness on 25 July 1995 at 89 years old. His remains are in Chacarita Cemetery in an imposing mausoleum, the work of Juan Carlos Ferraro (1997), which was made thanks to the generous contribution of his fans. His funeral received great attention with an impressive caravan that marched in reverse along Corrientes Avenue.

== "San Pugliese" ==
It is said that during a Charly García recital a series of situations and technical problems were triggered that delayed the start of the show. The sound was not working well, until someone from the team tried to do a test with a record of Maestro Pugliese. Everything began to improve and Charly gave the show. Hence the myth of good luck that the invocation of the musician brought.

In 2000, five years after Pugliese's death, the musician Alberto Muñoz wrote a prayer to pray to the tango patron saint.

Spanish	English
"Protégenos de todo aquel que no escucha. Ampáranos de la mufa de los que insisten con la patita de pollo nacional. Ayúdanos a entrar en la armonía e ilumínanos para que no sea la desgracia la única acción cooperativa. Llévanos con tu misterio hacia una pasión que no parta los huesos y no nos dejes en silencio mirando un bandoneón sobre una silla. En el nombre de Osvaldo Pugliese".	"Protect us from all those who do not listen. Protect us from the bad luck of those who insist with the national chicken leg. Help us to enter into harmony and enlighten us so that misfortune is not the only cooperative action. Take us with your mystery towards a passion that doesn't break bones and doesn't leave us in silence looking at a bandoneon on a chair. In the name of Osvaldo Pugliese ".

Other artists, including León Gieco and Javier Calamaro, acknowledged that they invoked the musician born on December 2, 1905, to ward off any inconvenience. "We always mention Pugliese", Gieco sings in "Los Salieris de Charly", a song dated 1992. Sebastián Bianchini, from the Tree group, composed an ironic song dedicated to Pugliese ("Suerte")

"It seems that mixing his musical activity with the political would mean making it dirty, but he never loses sight of this ethical-aesthetic relationship that he has known how to project and shape in his interlocutors", said María Mercedes Liska

In the image of "Saint Pugliese" the artist and the man committed to society are synthesized, without his name being at the mercy of the negative connotations of politics.

== Filmography ==
He participated as an actor in the films:

- Mis cinco hijos (1946).
- Tango y tango (1984).
- Coexistencia (1993).
- Muchas gracias maestro (1993), unfinished documentary.

== Awards ==
- In 1986, during the tenure of Mayor Julio César Saguier, the Municipality of the City of Buenos Aires declared him "Ciudadano Ilustre".
- In 1988 he was awarded with the title of Commander of Ordre des Arts et des Lettres by the Ministry of Culture of France.
- In 1992, on 11 November he was awarded with the Alejo Carpentier medal, the most important cultural distinction by the Council of State of Cuba.
