= La Chacarita Cemetery =

National Cemetery of Argentina

Coordinates: 34°35′27″S 58°27′35″W

- Cementerio de La Chacarita
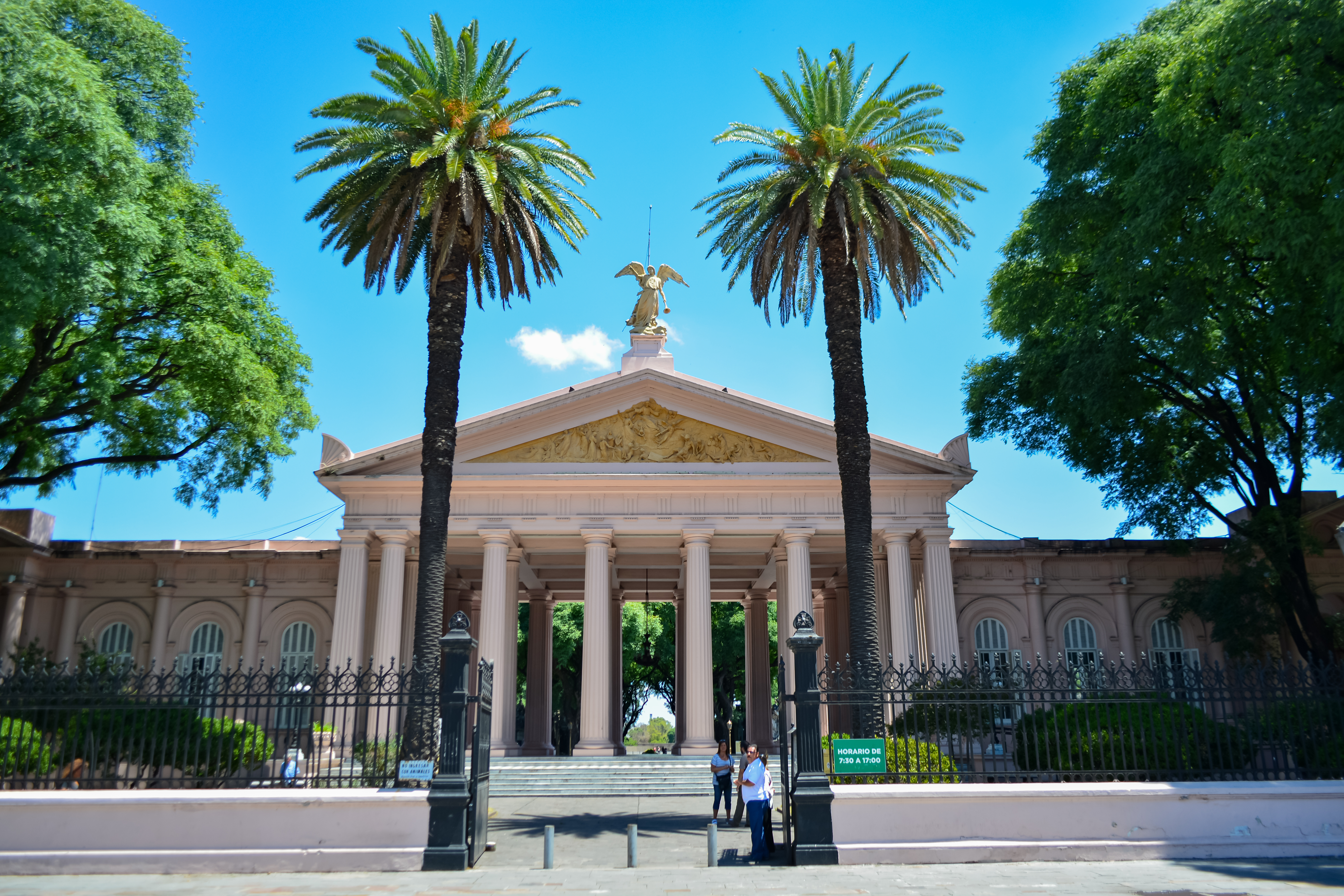
- Main entrance on Av. Guzmán
- Interactive map of La Chacarita Cemetery

Details
- Established: April 14, 1871; 155 years ago
- Location: Buenos Aires
- Country: Argentina
- Type: Public
- Owned by: City of Buenos Aires
- Size: 95 hectares (230 acres)
- Website: buenosaires.gob.ar/cementerio

La Chacarita Cemetery (Spanish: Cementerio de la Chacarita, also known as "Cementerio del Oeste") is a cemetery in the Chacarita neighborhood in Buenos Aires, Argentina. It is the largest in the country, with an area of 95 hectares (230 acres).

Chacarita Cemetery has designated areas for members of the Argentine artistic community, including writers, prominent composers and actors. The Justicialist leader and former president Juan Perón was buried here until his remains were relocated in 2006 to a mausoleum in his former home in San Vicente.

== History ==
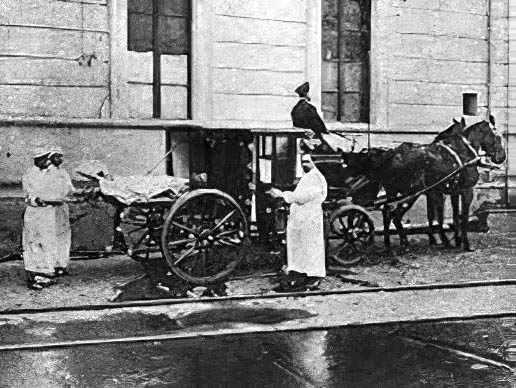
Hearse during the yellow fever epidemic in Buenos Aires

The cemetery owes its existence to a yellow fever epidemic in 1871, when existing cemeteries were strained beyond capacity (the upscale La Recoleta Cemetery refused to allow the burial of victims of the epidemic). Until then, the "Cementerio del Sud" (opened in 1867 to bury the dead from cholera and typhoid fever epidemics, located in Parque Patricios) operated as the city's cemetery. During the yellow fever epidemic over 700 people per day were buried there. When the capacity of 18,000 collapsed, the cemetery was closed and a search for a new place started.

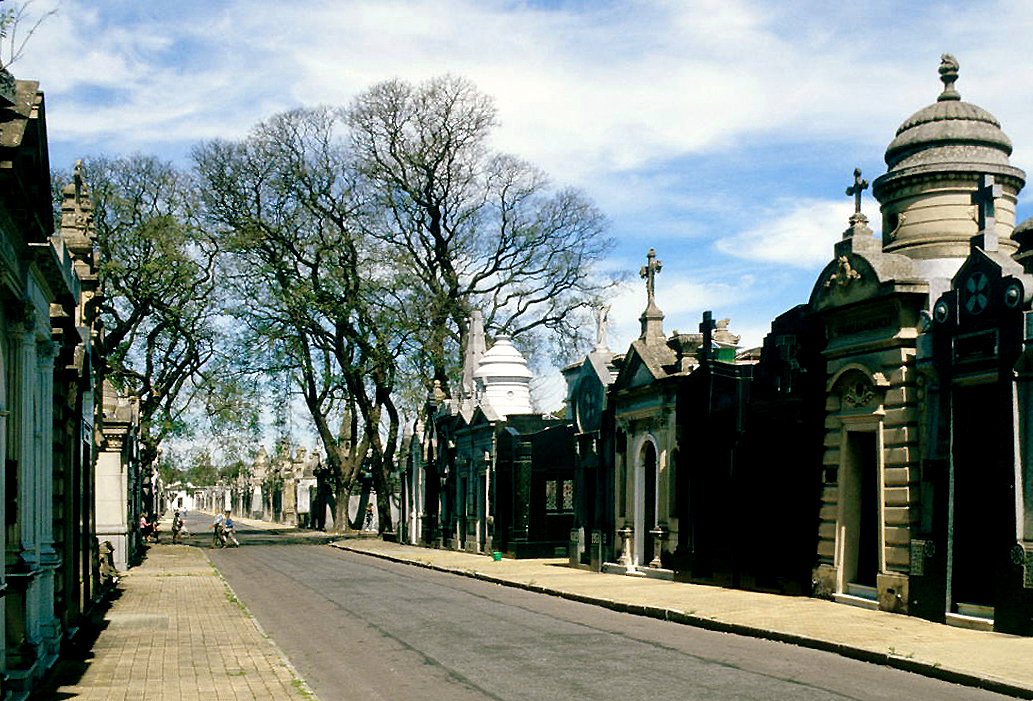
A typical "street" lined with mausoleums.

Governor Emlio Mitre created the "Enterratorio General de Buenos Aires", which would be built on a land in the "Chacarita de los Colegiales". The name "chácara" mean "agricultural land" while "Colegiales" referred to students of Colegio Nacional de Buenos Aires that had spent their summertime at those lands since the 18th. century. In the northwest section, a 5-hectare land was chosen, in the same place where a cemetery owned by Jesuit priests existed. Lands that were part of Partido de Belgrano were expropriated. Those lands were used for agriculture purposes, most of them were gardens with a few ranches on them. Mitre also ordered the construction of a road to access the cemetery and a railroad.

The cemetery was opened on 14 April 1871, surrounded by Avenida Dorrego, Jorge Newbery, Avenida Corrientes, and Av. Guzmán. Its main entrance was located on Av. Corrientes. As the epidemic went by, coffins accumulated at the cemetery's door, sometimes buries took a week due to the great number of victims.

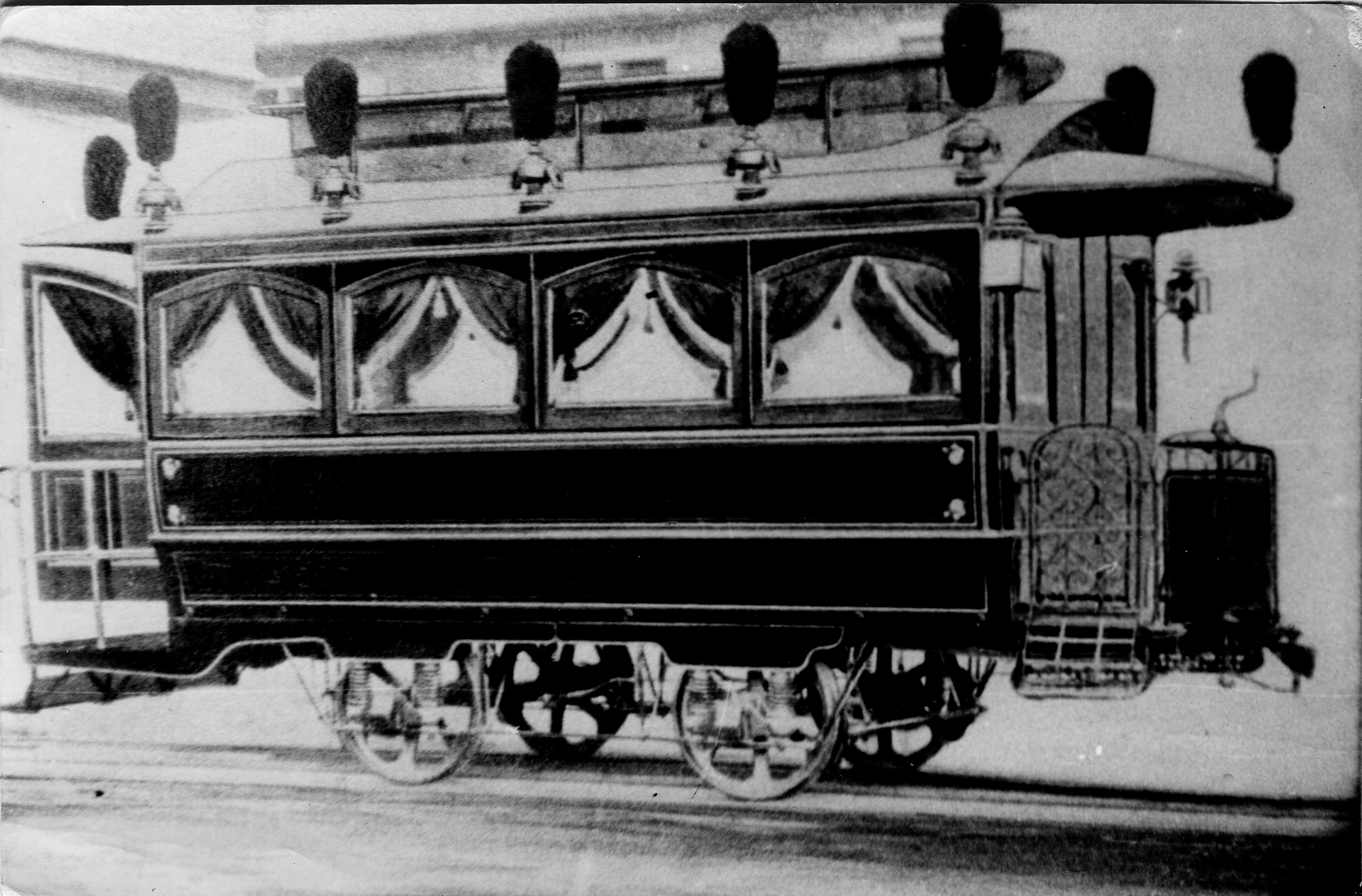
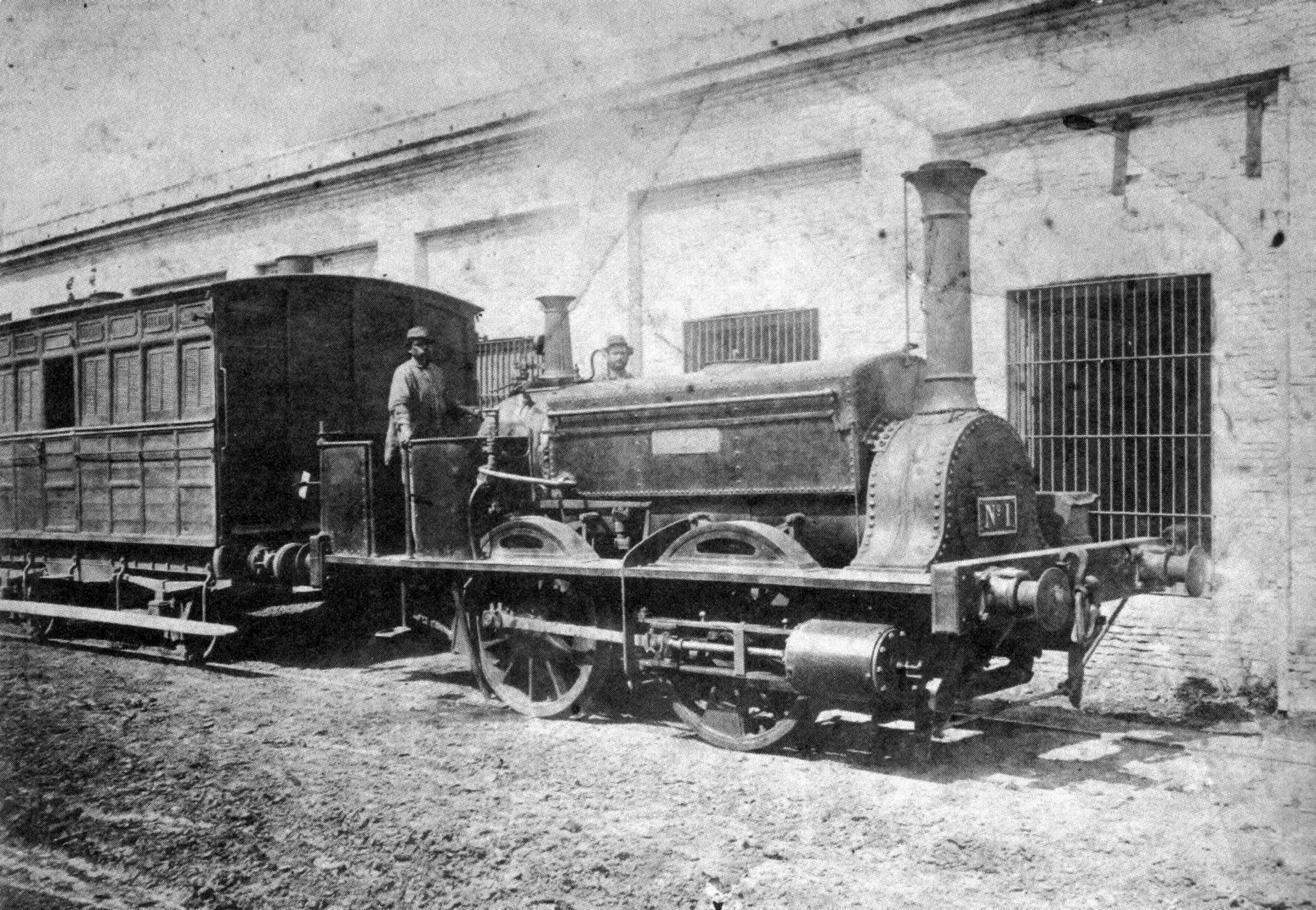
Rolling stock used to transport coffins to the cemetery: "Tramway Rural" coaches (left) were pulled by La Porteña locomotive (right)

British rail company Buenos Aires Western Railway was commissioned to build a 6-km length line from the Buenos Aires downtown to the cemetery. It was nicknamed tren fúnebre and departed from Av. Corrientes and Ecuador (Bermejo station, a huge shed where the coffins were loaded). It had two stops, the first on Medrano street and the other on Ministro Inglés street (today Av. Scalabrini Ortiz) where the train loaded more coffins. Workshops were on Corrientes and Pueyrredón streets and they served as terminus for a short time.

Construction which cost of m$n 2,2 million was directed by French engineer Augusto Ringuelet who finished it on 11 April. Trains were pulled by La Porteña, the locomotive that had served in the inauguration of the Argentine railway network in 1857. The last wagon was occupied by dead relatives. The service had a frequency of 2 trains per day. Between February and June, more than 15,000 people died.

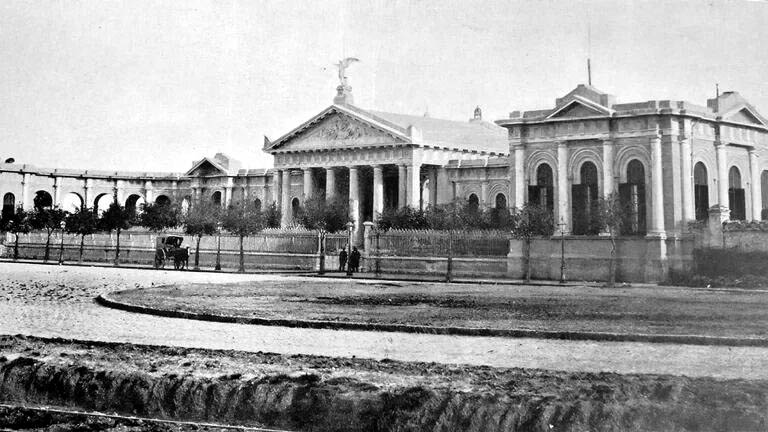
The cemetery in 1886

In that first Chacarita Cemetery (also known as "Cementerio Viejo"), 3,423 people were buried until it was closed in 1886. The current Chacarita Cemetery was officially established on 9 December 1886. It had been projected by French engineer Enrique Clement during the government of major Torcuato de Alvear, and was initially named "Cementerio del Oeste" but then renamed as its predecessor in 1949.

The original Cementerio Viejo of Parque Patricios would be reopened in 1880 to bury the dead of Combate de los Corrales, a fight for Buenos Aires that took place on 22 June. In 1897 it was transformed into a public park, being today the "Parque Florentino Ameghino".

=== British and German Cemeteries ===
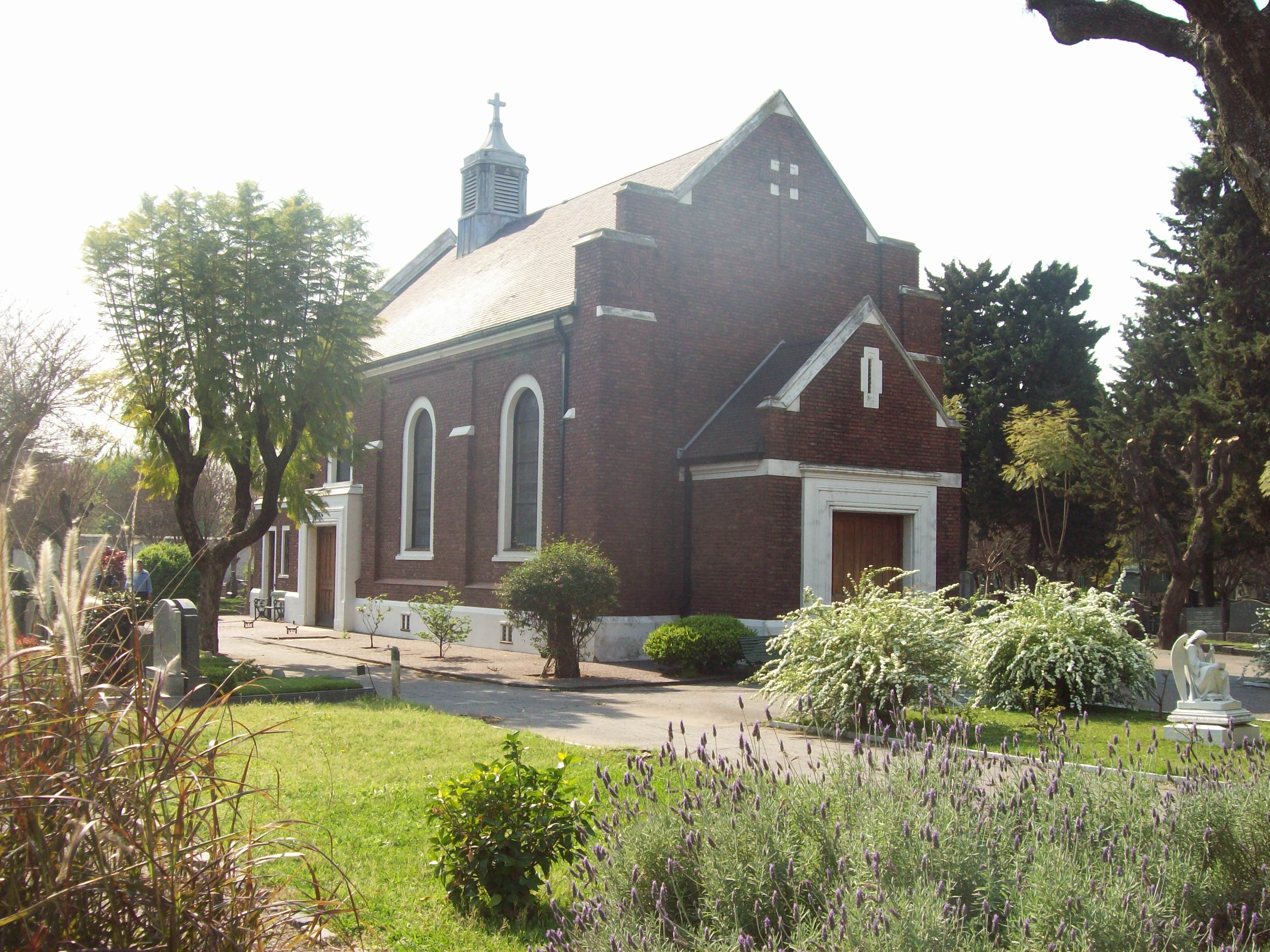
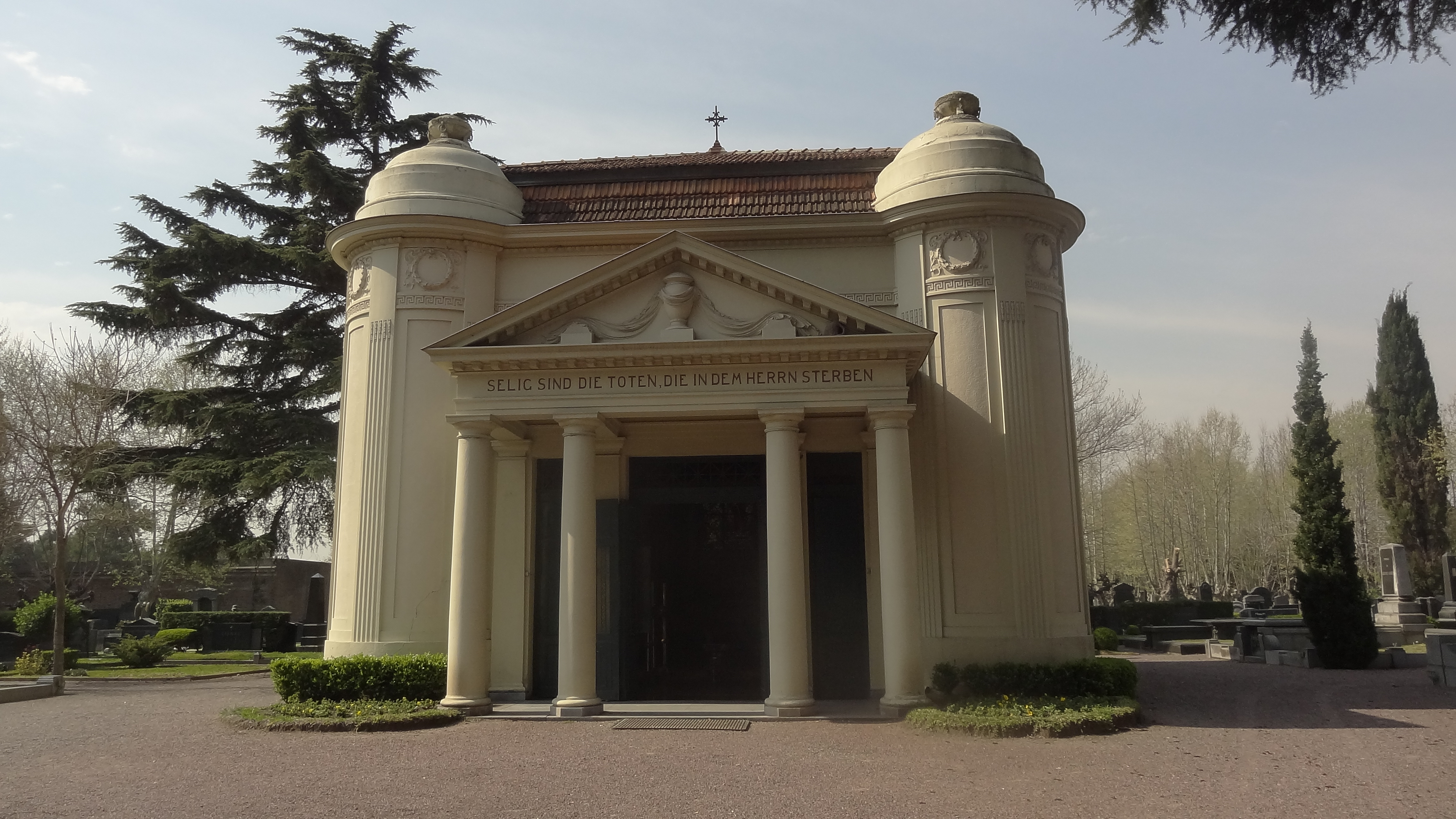
British (left) and German cemetery chapels

In the 19th century a large number of Britons came to Argentina to work in the many areas of the economy in which England then had extensive interests. At first the British Cemetery was founded beside the Socorro Chapel (started 1821 - authorized on 22 February 1822). In 1833 the cemetery had to move to what was then called Victoria Cemetery (today the "Plaza 1° de Mayo") until November, 1892, when they were asked by the Municipality to move.

Section 16 of the Chacarita Cemetery was given in exchange for the Victoria Cemetery. Eventually in 1913 the Cementerio Británico (English: British Cemetery) (or so called "De Disidentes or Corporación del Cementerio Británico de Bs. As.") was divided into the German and the British cemeteries as we know them today, because the two local communities had grown since the beginning of the 19th century.

The British Cemetery and the German Cemetery are today not managed by or part of Chacarita Cemetery.

== Notable interments ==
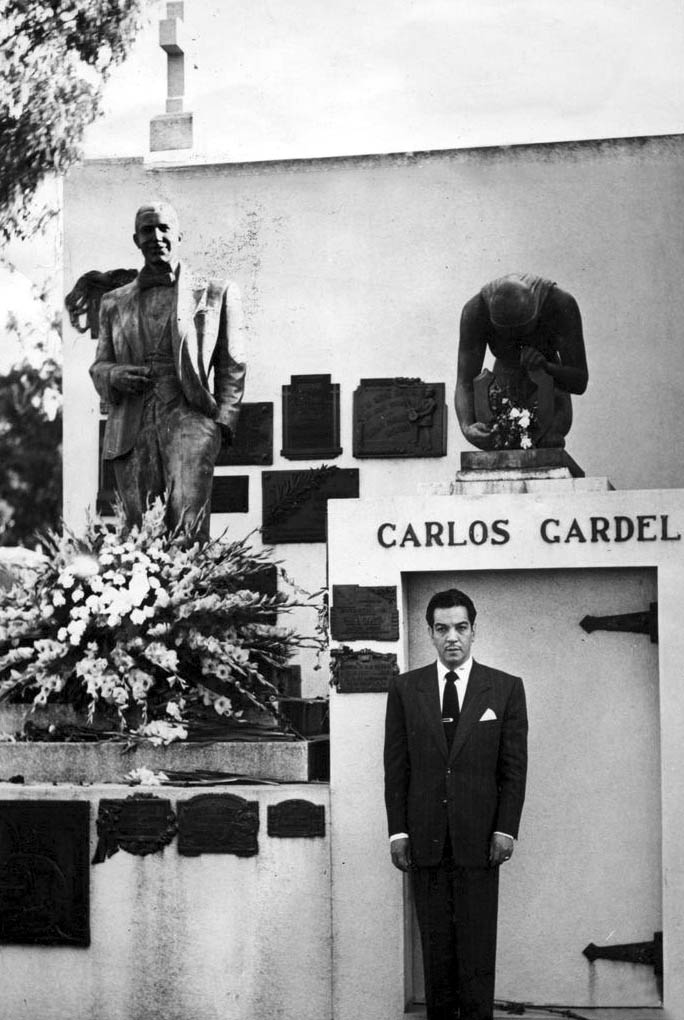
Mexican actor Cantinflas at Carlos Gardel's grave in Chacarita (1961)

=== La Chacarita Cemetery ===
Notable burials in La Chacarita cemetery include:

- Carlos Acuña (1914–1999), tango singer, composer
- Aída Alberti (1915–2006), actress
- Alfredo Alcón (1930–2014), actor
- Oscar Alemán (1909–1980), jazz musician
- José Alonso (trade unionist), (1917–1970)
- José Amalfitani (1894–1969), president of the Vélez Sarsfield football team
- Alberto Anchart (1931–2011), actor
- Cosme Argerich (1758–1820), doctor and pioneer of military field medicine
- Manuel Argerich (1835–1871), physician, philosopher, lawyer
- Mirta Arlt (1923–2014), writer, professor, translator
- Emin Arslan (1868–1943), diplomat, writer, editor
- Fernando Báez Sosa (2001–2020), law student
- María Lorenza Barreneche (1926–2016), First Lady of Argentina
- Guillermo Battaglia (1899–1988), actor
- Nelly Beltrán (1925–2007), actress
- Antonio J. Benítez (1903–1992), politician
- Paquita Bernardo (1900–1925), musician, tango composer
- Antonio Berni (1905–1981), painter
- Eladia Blázquez (1931–2005), tango vocalist and composer
- Alejandra Boero (1918–2006), actress
- Oscar Bonavena (1942–1976), heavyweight boxer
- Ángel Borlenghi (1904–1962), trade-unionist and Peronist politician
- Sofía Bozán (1904–1958), actress and tango vocalist
- Alfredo Bravo (1925–2003), Socialist politician
- Alicia Bruzzo (1945–2007), actress
- Clemar Bucci (1920–2011), race car driver
- Enrique Cadícamo (1900–1999), author, tango lyricist
- Francisco Canaro (1888–1964), tango bandleader and composer
- Evaristo Carriego (1883–1912), poet, journalist
- Adolfo Castelo (1935–2004), news anchorman
- Alberto Castillo (1914–2002), tango singer
- Orestes Caviglia (1893–1971), stage director and actor
- Cátulo Castillo (1906–1975), musician, composer, poet, boxer
- Gustavo Cerati (1959–2014), rock singer, songwriter, composer, producer
- José Cibrián (1916–2002), stage director and actor
- Pascual Contursi (1888–1932), tango composer
- Carlos Cores (1923–2000), actor
- Juan d'Arienzo (1900–1976), orchestra leader
- Julio de Caro (1899–1980), tango bandleader and composer
- Juan de Dios Filiberto (1885–1964), tango composer
- Carlos di Sarli (1903–1960), tango bandleader
- Guido di Tella (1931–2001), Foreign Minister
- Torcuato di Tella (1892–1948), industrialist
- Edgardo Donato (1897–1963), tango composer
- Vito Dumas (1900–1965), navigator
- Ulises Dumont (1937–2008), actor
- Samuel Eichelbaum (1894–1967), writer
- José Embrioni (1906–1996), general and Buenos Aires mayor
- Homero Expósito (1918–1987), tango lyricist
- Ada Falcón (1905–2002), tango vocalist
- Eduardo Falú (1923–2013), folk musician
- Edelmiro Farrell (1887–1980), President of Argentina
- León Ferrari (1920–2013), conceptual artist
- Roberto Firpo (1884–1969), tango composer
- Norma Fontenla (1930–1971), prima ballerina
- Osvaldo Fresedo (1897–1984), bandoneónist and tango composer
- María Rosa Gallo (1925–2004), actress
- Leopoldo Galtieri (1926–2003), President of Argentina
- Óscar Alfredo Gálvez (1913–1989), race car driver
- Carlos Gardel (1890–1935), iconic tango singer, actor
- José María Gatica (1925–1963), boxer
- Carlos Enrique Gavito (1942–2005), tango dancer
- Severino Di Giovanni (1901–1931), Italian anarchist
- Enrique Gorriarán Merlo (1941–2006), founder of ERP guerilla group
- Roberto Goyeneche (1926–1994), tango singer
- Paul Groussac (1848–1929), French-born writer, historian
- Bernardo Houssay (1887–1971), Nobel Prize in Medicine
- José Ingenieros (1877–1925), physician and philosopher
- Maurice Jouvet (1923–1999), French-born actor
- Ángel Labruna (1918–1983), football player
- Lydia Lamaison (1914–2012), actress
- Juan Carlos Lectoure (1936–2002), boxing promoter
- Inda Ledesma (1926–2010), actress
- Alfredo Le Pera (1900–1935), tango composer
- Irineo Leguisamo (1903–1985), thoroughbred racing jockey
- Antonio Vespucio Liberti (1900–1978), president of the River Plate football team
- Nélida Lobato (1934–1982), dancer
- María Loredo (1854–1928), faith healer
- Gianni Lunadei (1938–1998), actor
- Tito Lusiardo (1896–1982), tango dancer
- Pedro Maffia (1899–1967), bandoneónist
- Agustín Magaldi (1898–1938), tango vocalist
- Azucena Maizani (1902–1970), tango vocalist
- Homero Manzi (1907–1951), writer and tango composer
- Mona Maris (1903–1991), actress
- Duilio Marzio (1923–2013), actor
- Tita Merello (1904–2002), actress
- Alberto Migré (1931–2006), screenwriter
- Zully Moreno (1920–1999), actress
- Oscar Moro (1948–2006), rock drummer
- Federico Moura (1951–1988), singer, songwriter
- Jorge Newbery (1875–1914), pioneer aviator, sportsman
- Oscar Núñez (1929–2012), actor
- Alberto Olmedo (1933–1988), comedian
- Juan Carlos Onganía (1914–1995), President of Argentina
- Pappo (1950–2005), musician (cremated here, ashes were scattered)
- Mario Passano (1925–1995), actor
- Malvina Pastorino (1916–1994), actress
- Adolfo Pedernera (1918–1995), football player
- Ivo Pelay (1893–1959), poet, playwright
- Pascual Pérez (1926–1977), champion boxer
- Nathán Pinzón (1917–1993), actor
- Pablo Podestá (1875–1923), actor
- Jorge Porcel (1936–2006), comedian
- Javier Portales (1937–2003), comedian
- Glenn Postolski (1966-2024), Professor and academic
- Osvaldo Pugliese (1905–1995), composer, pianist
- Benito Quinquela Martín (1890–1977), painter
- Francisco Rabanal (1906–1982), Mayor of Buenos Aires
- Pedro Pablo Ramírez (1884–1962), President of Argentina
- Raúl Riganti (1893–1970), race car driver
- Edmundo Rivero (1911–1986), tango vocalist
- Nélida Roca (1929–1999), dancer
- Alberto Rocamora (1911–2004), politician
- José Ignacio Rucci (1924–1973), trade-unionist
- Luis Sandrini (1905–1980), comedian
- Enrique Santos Discépolo (1901–1951), tango composer
- Enrique Sdrech (1928–2003), journalist
- Mohamed Alí Seineldín (1933–2009), War Hero
- Enrique Serrano (1891–1965), actor
- Osvaldo Soriano (1943–1997), novelist
- Hugo Soto (actor) (1953–1994)
- Alfonsina Storni (1892–1938), poet
- Carlos Thays (1849–1934), landscape designer and urbanist
- Victoria Torni (1893–1977), schoolteacher and First Lady of Argentina
- Juan Carlos Thorry (1908–2000), actor, entertainer
- Cacho Tirao (1941–2007), guitarist
- Leopoldo Torre Nilsson (1924–1978), film director
- Lolita Torres (1930–2002), actress, singer
- Aníbal Troilo (1914–1975), musician
- Saúl Ubaldini (1936–2006), trade-unionist
- Augusto Vandor (1923–1969), trade-unionist
- Ángel Villoldo (1861–1919), the "father of Tango"
- Roberto Viola (1924–1994), President of Argentina
- María Elena Walsh (1930–2011), poet and composer
- Héctor Yazalde (1946–1997), football player
- Tincho Zabala (1923–2001), comedian
- Marcos Zucker (1921–2003), actor

=== British Cemetery ===
- Lucas Bridges (1874–1949), Anglo-Argentine author
- Thomas Bridges (1842–1898), Anglican missionary
- Frank Brown (1858–1943), popular English clown
- Cecilia Grierson (1859–1934), physician and feminist
- Alexander Watson Hutton (1853–1936), founder of Argentine football
- Juan Bautista Thorne (1807–1885), Army Colonel

=== German Cemetery ===
- Hans Langsdorff (1894–1939), Captain of the World War II pocket battleship Admiral Graf Spee
- Friedrich Bergius (1884–1949), Nobel Prize in Chemistry
- Annemarie Heinrich (1912–2005), photographer
- Jeannette Campbell (1916–2003), swimmer
- Roberto Peper (1913–1999), swimmer

== Gallery ==
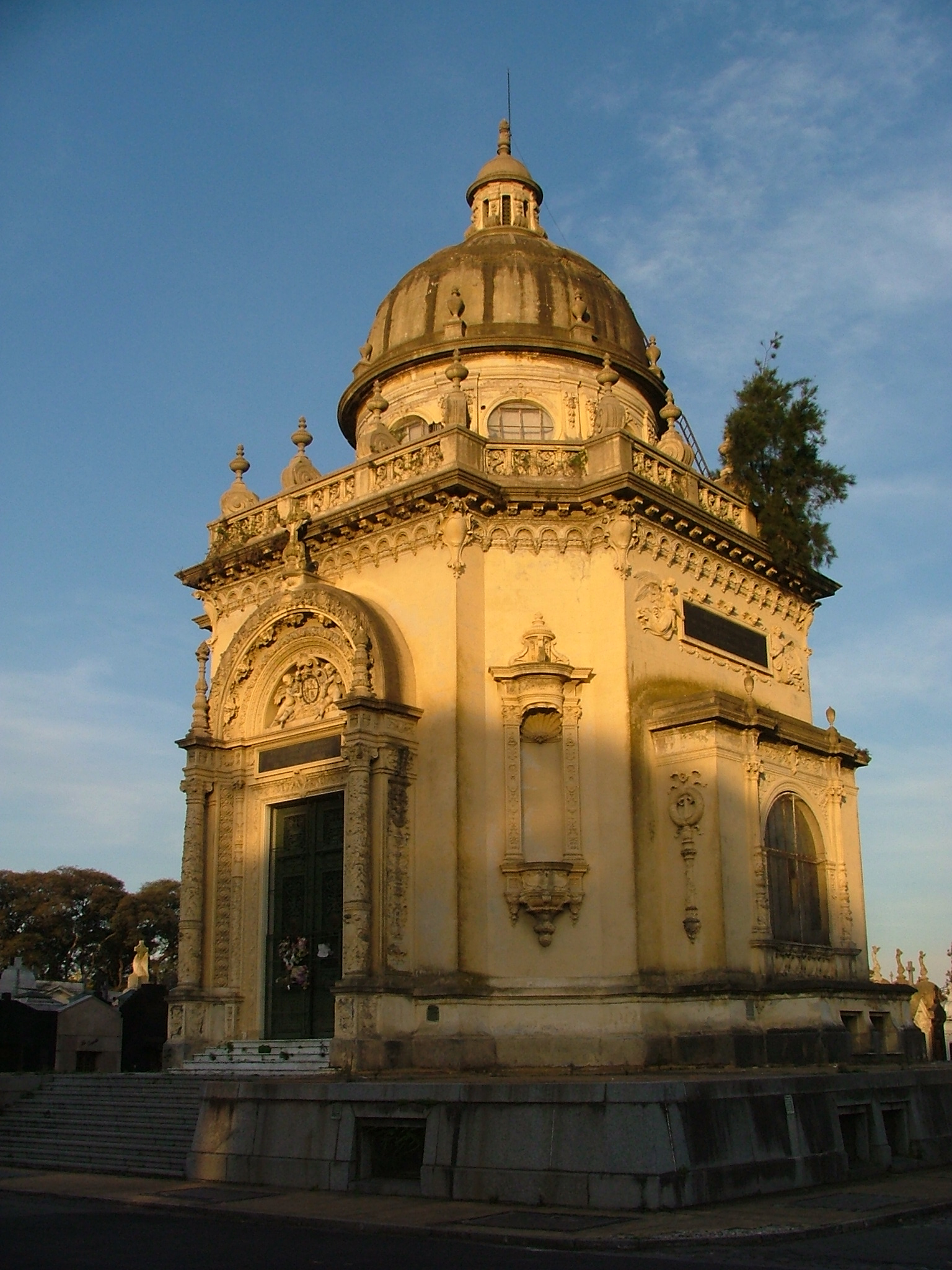
Spanish-Argentine Mutual Society pantheon

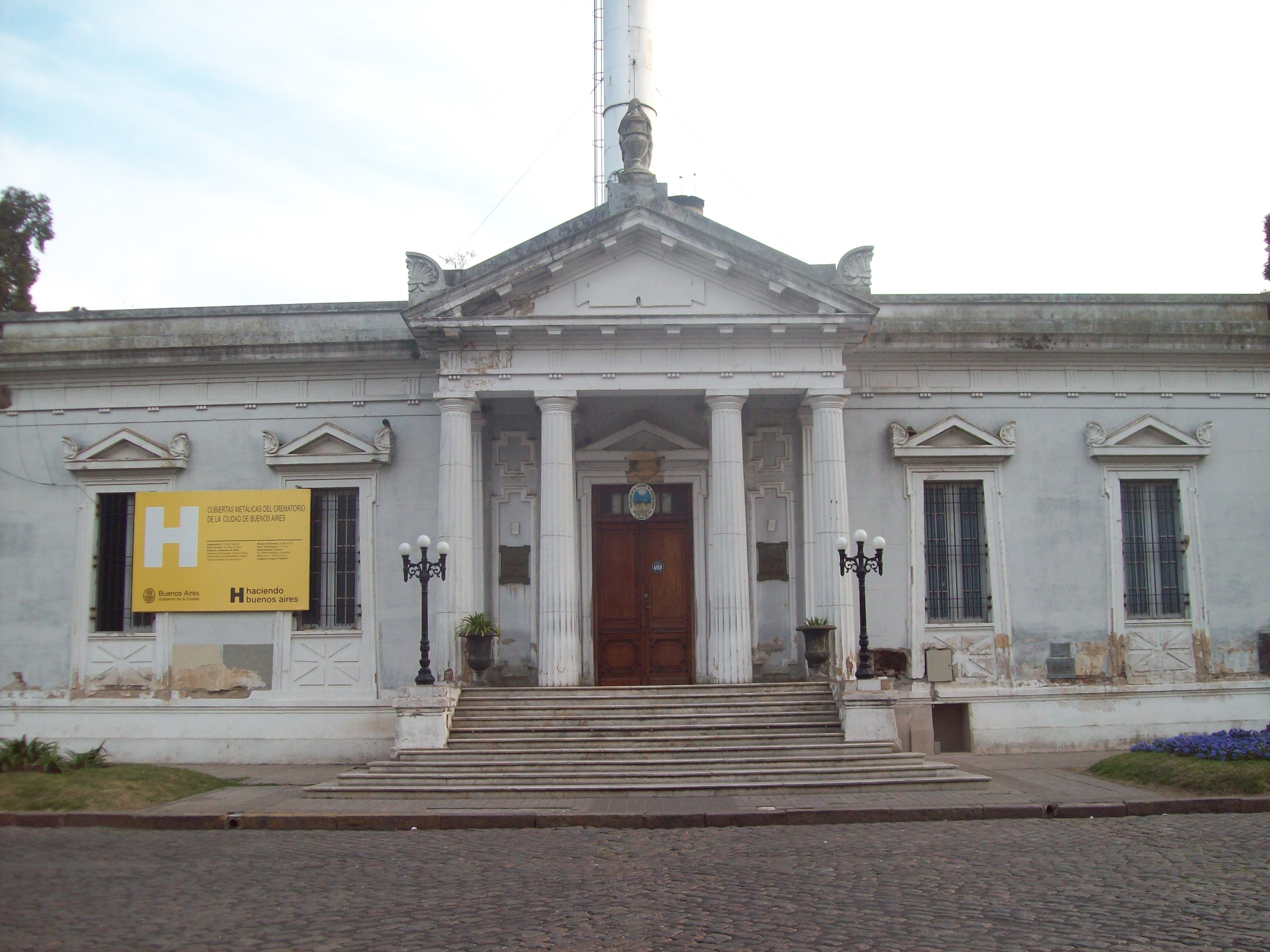
Crematorium

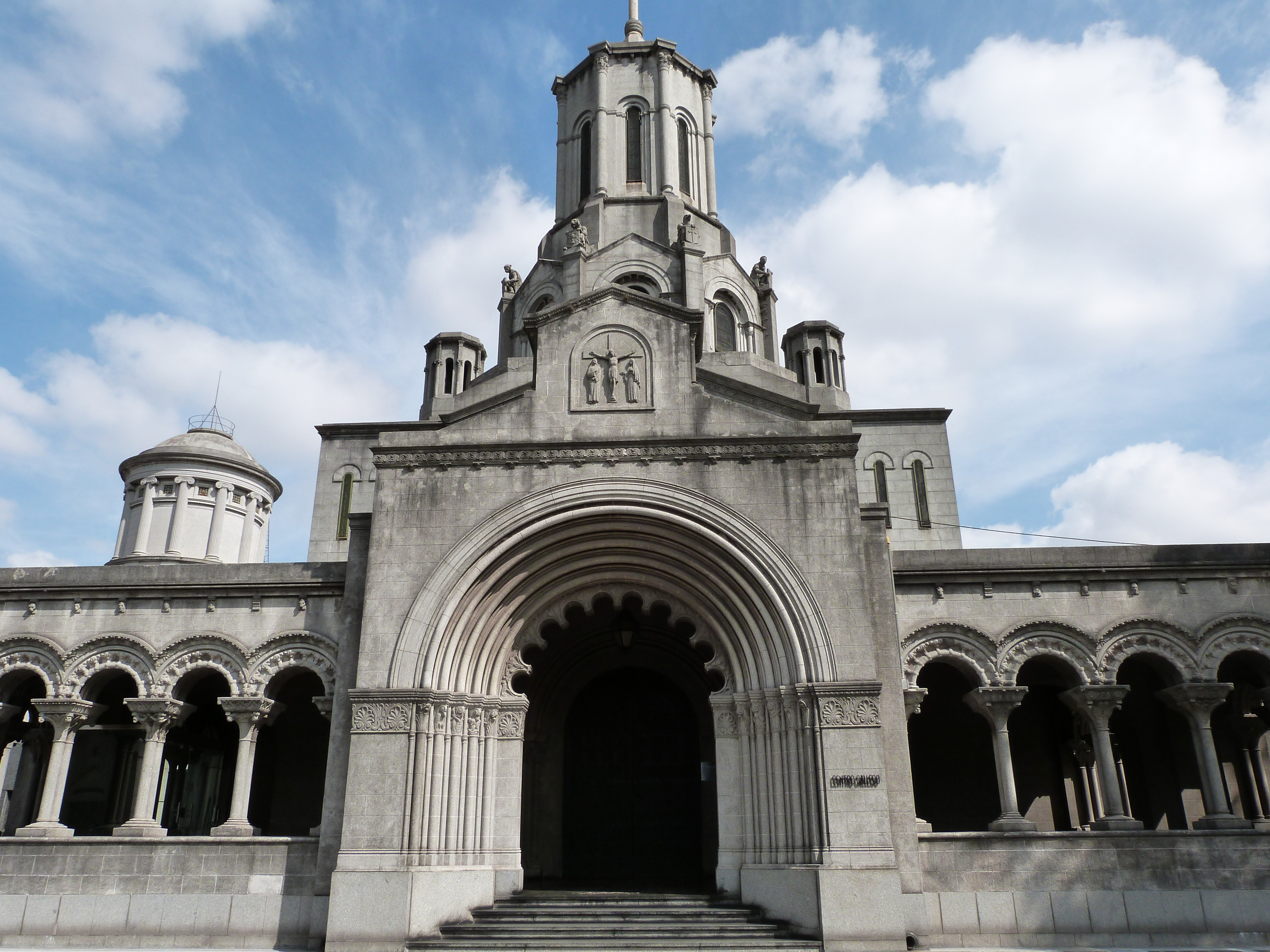
Galician Center pantheon

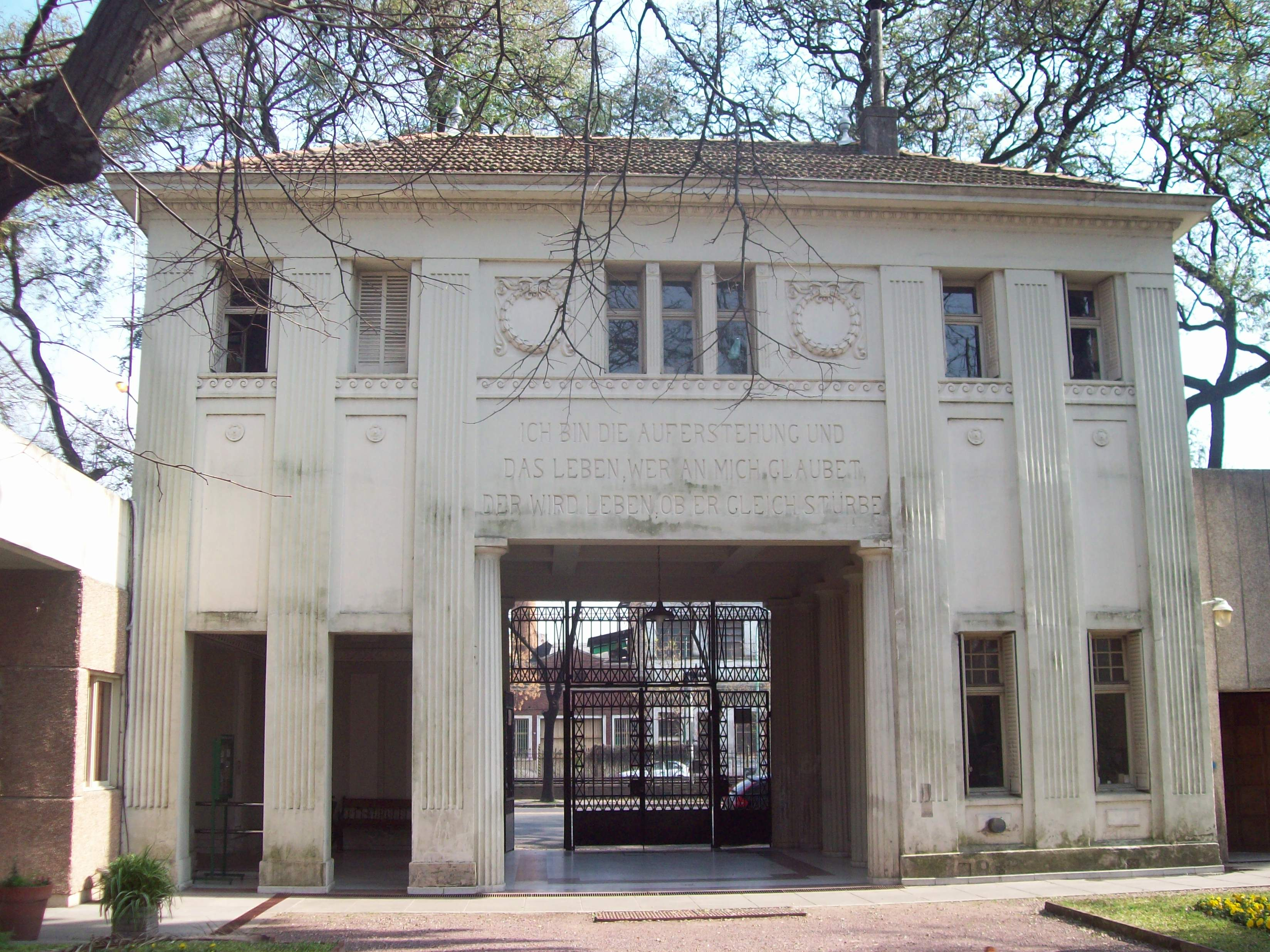
German Cemetery, main gates

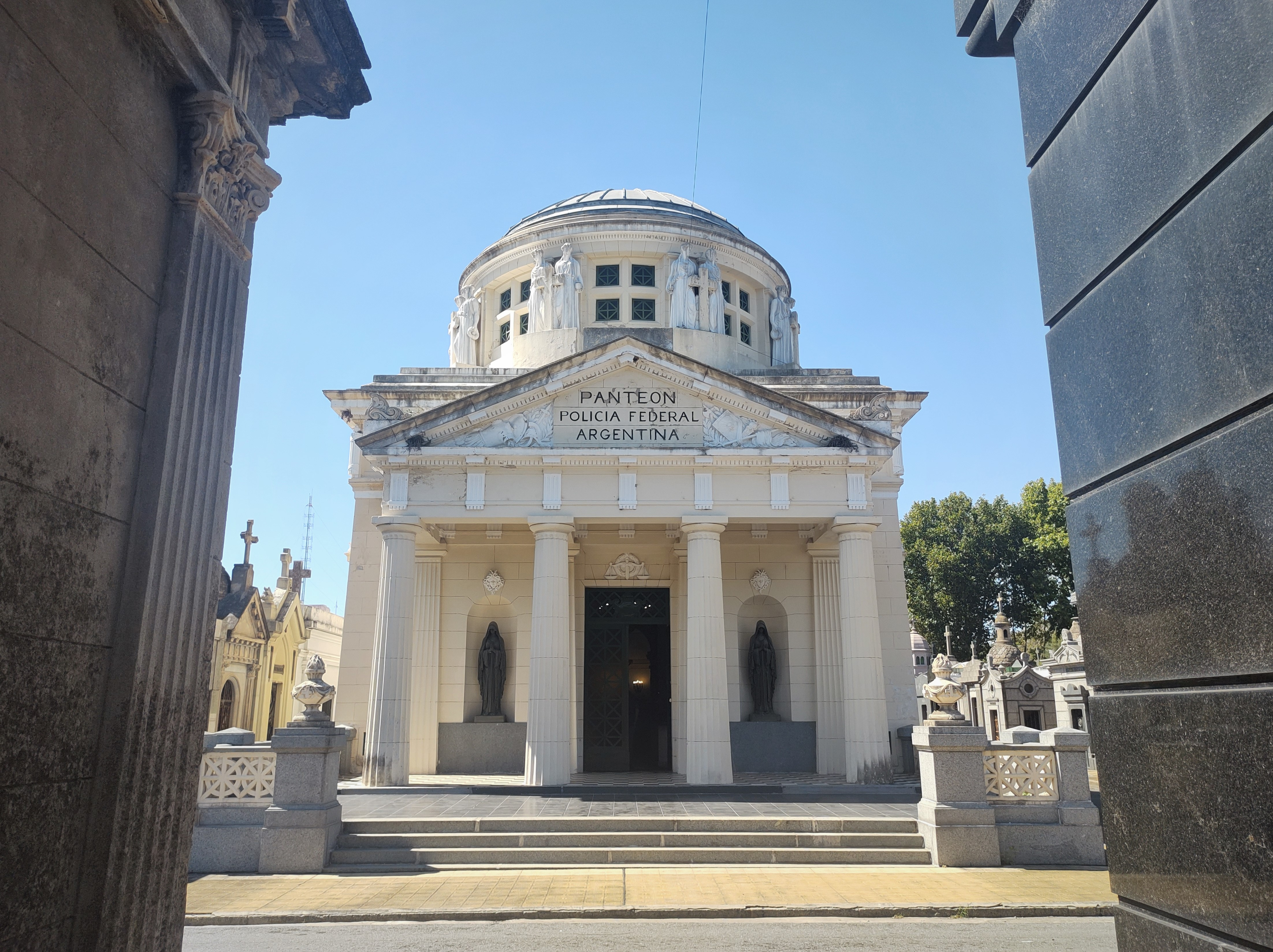
Federal Police Pantheon

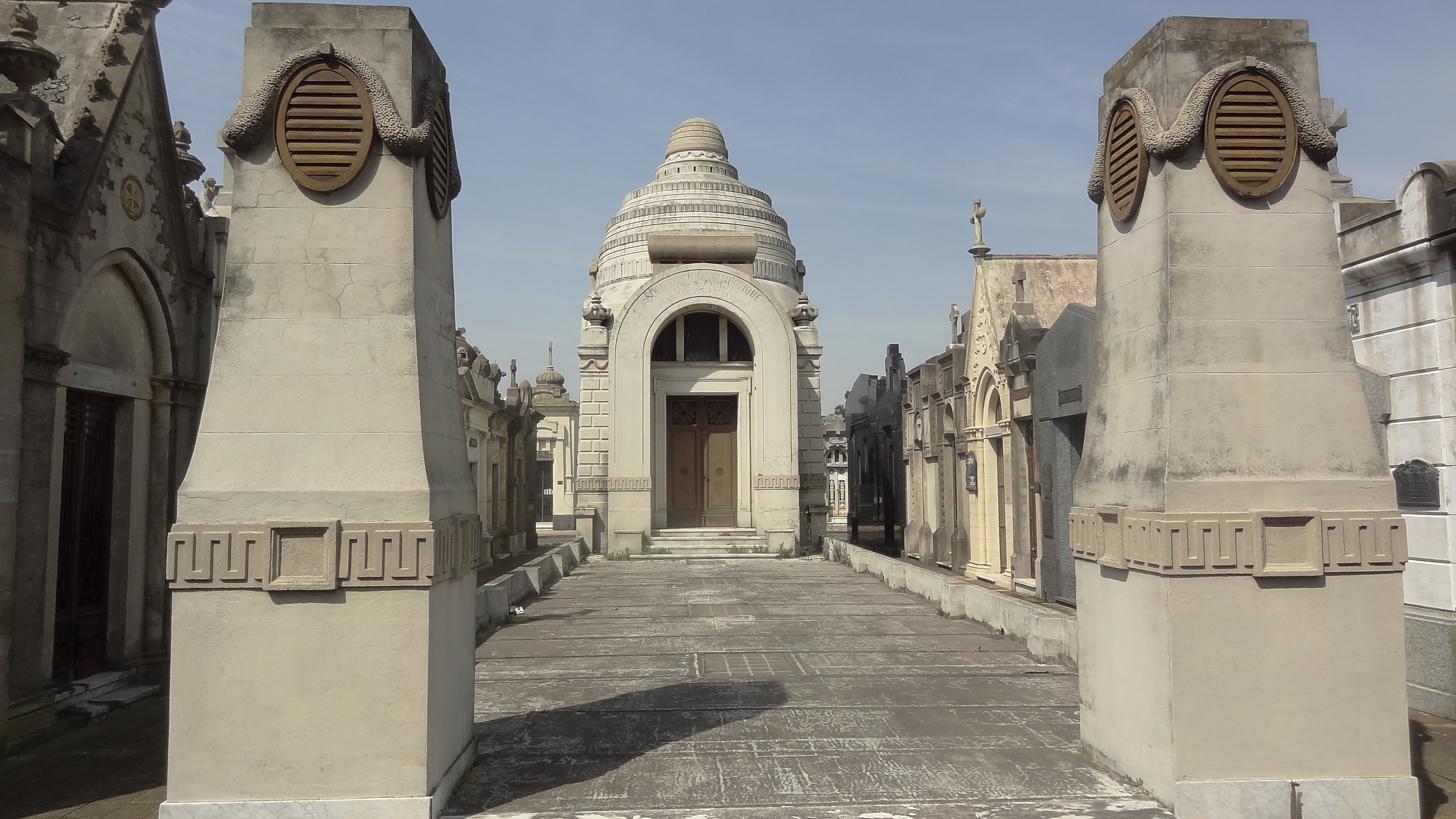
French Philantropic Society
