= Jennie Howard =

American educationist (1845–1933)

Jennie Eliza Howard (24 July 1845 in Coldbrook Springs, Massachusetts – 29 July 1933 in Buenos Aires, Argentina) was an American educationist. She was raised in North Prescott, Massachusetts, and attended Worcester Academy before entering Framingham Normal School (now Framingham State University) in March 1864. Howard graduated Framingham Normal School in 1866.

In 1883, Howard and twenty-two other American teachers went to Argentina at the request of Domingo Faustino Sarmiento, Argentina's seventh constitutional president. The teachers were concentrated in Escuela Normal de Paraná, Entre Ríos to study Spanish, and then divided into small groups and were deployed to different parts of the country. Many of the teachers were given only four months of language training. Howard was 38 and already an experienced teacher when she arrived in Argentina. After four months in Parana, Howard and Edith Howe, another Framingham School graduate, assisted in the organization of the Girls' Normal School of Corrientes, where they stayed for two years.

After her time abroad, Howard became regent and vice-directress of the Girls' Normal School in Cordoba. She remained there for two years and was subsequently transferred to the Mixed Normal School of San Nicholas, where she remained for sixteen years.

In Women in Argentina: Early Travels, Monica Szurmuk wrote that Howard viewed Argentina as backward and barbaric. Howard wrote a book about her experiences as an educator in Argentina titled In Distant Climes and Other Years. Howard wrote that "it is more difficult for the Latin race to speak the truth" and the Argentine teachers had "deeply grounded faults to be eradicated in the young teacher's training which will still take some generations to eradicate."

Howard retired in 1903 and remained in her adopted country until her death in 1933. Buried at the Cementerio Británico, near from La Chacarita Cemetery in Buenos Aires. But, in September 25th, 1991, she was exhumed, and her mortal remains were transported to the Municipal Cemetery of San Nicolás de los Arroyos, and buried in the "Templete al Eterno Reconocimiento".
