= Cementerio Británico =

Cemetery in Buenos Aires, Argentina

Coordinates: 34.589809°S 58.464676°W

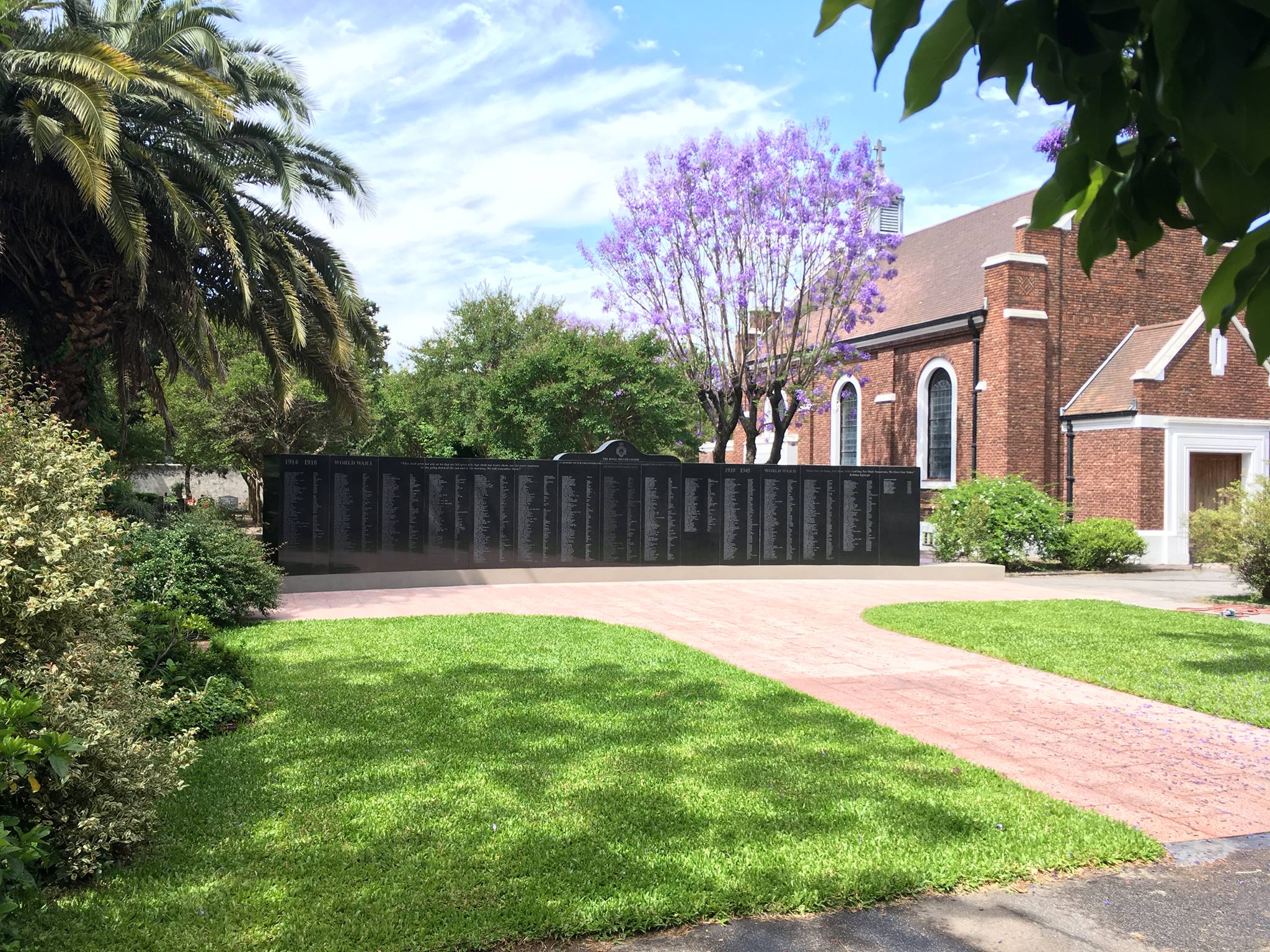
- Interactive map of Cementerio Británico

Details
- Established: 1822
- Location: Buenos Aires
- Country: Argentina

Cementerio Británico de Buenos Aires, also known in English as Buenos Aires British cemetery, is a cemetery in Buenos Aires, Argentina. It is in the district of Chacarita in the northern part of Buenos Aires, adjacent to La Chacarita Cemetery.

== History of the cemetery ==
The British Cemetery was inaugurated in April 1821; the first president of Argentina, Bernardino Rivadavia, approved the project on 19 March 1821 and the purchase of the land. The first address was Calle Juncal (Juncal Street) today number 866, beside the building that houses Socorro Church. The first burial took place a few days after 19 March 1821 when it was still an open paddock. This burial was of a 30 year old Englishman named John Adams, a carpenter by profession.

In 1833 the Cemetery was moved to Calle Victoria (Victoria Street), (today Calle Hipólito Yrigoyen), between Pasco and Pichincha, until 1892. The site is today a plaza called "1 de Mayo".

=== Protestant Cemetery of Victoria ===
In May 1827 the British consul Woodbine Parish started negotiations with the government to obtain permission for the British community to build a new temple and another plot for the cemetery, since the existing cemetery (at Socorro) was full.

In February 1829, the Rosas government made available a plot for the construction of the temple, but there were no funds for the donation of the land for the new cemetery. On 21 August 1832, the then British consul Griffiths reported that the British government would cover half of the expenses necessary for the new cemetery.

In 1833 Victoria Cemetery was opened in today's Plaza 1° de Mayo, between Calle Hipólito Yrigoyen (then Calle Victoria) and Pasco, Alsina and Pichincha Streets.

The new land, measuring 100m x 100m, was acquired from Manuel La Serna and Maria Luisa Roseti for $4,500. The land was more expensive than expected, and the estimated budget was insufficient to finish the project. In March, 1833 the Buenos Aires English language newspaper, The British Packet, reported that the subscriptions were not sufficient so more contributions were requested from the community.

When on 7 June 1833 the purchase of the land was concluded it was agreed that it was exclusively for Protestants of the city.

Victoria Cemetery received its first two British burials on 6 November 1833.

The plots were freely transferable, but no trees could be planted; no tablets or monuments against the walls or common space were allowed. Carriages, wagons, horses or cattle were not allowed to enter. The gravedigger would take record and deliver a copy to the British chaplain for the official record.

Victoria Cemetery remained open for almost sixty years, with a temporary closure in two occasions: during Hilario Lagos's siege in 1853, and during the yellow fever outbreak in 1871, when the government prohibited burial in urban cemeteries.

As the city around the cemetery was growing, the neighbors wanted the cemetery moved further away. In 1869 the Municipality notified the cemetery that they had to go elsewhere, so they initiated negotiations, which dragged on for more than twenty years.

The last burial at Victoria Cemetery dates back to November, 1892. Some remains, monuments and headstones, were moved to the new cemetery, work that finished around 1923. The old Cemetery became the Plaza "1° de Mayo" where a commemorative plaque remains. Some say that the remains of Elizabeth Chitty, wife of Admiral William (Guillermo) Brown, are still under this plaza.

=== At La Chacarita ===
Section 16 of the Chacarita Cemetery was given in exchange for the Victoria Cemetery. The British Cemetery finally opened its doors at its current address in Chacarita on Sunday, 13 November 1892.

In 1913 the British Cemetery was divided into the German and the British Cemeteries as we know them today, because the two local communities had grown since the beginning of the 19th century.

=== War memorial and graves ===
The cemetery contains the war graves of one Royal Navy seaman of World War I and eleven British service personnel of World War II, comprising six from the Royal Navy and three of the Merchant Navy, besides one each from the Royal Artillery, Royal Marines and Royal Air Force.

On 16 November 2016 a war memorial, with the names of the 866 volunteers from Argentina who died in World War I and World War II engraved in the granite, was unveiled with the presence of Ambassadors; Defence Attachés; Argentine Military, the Buenos Aires Scottish Guard; the Honour Guard of the Argentine Air Force; the band from the Argentine Military School and over 300 members of the public and members of the Argentine British Community. The religious service was conducted by Archbishop Gregory Venabales, Primate of the Anglican Church in South America and Rev. Douglas Robertson of the Presbyterian church.

=== British Garden Cemetery in Pablo Nogués ===
The British Garden Cemetery in Pablo Nogués was inaugurated in July 1971.

The British Garden Cemetery is considered the first garden style in the country and it is situated in Ingeniero Pablo Nogués in the Province of Buenos Aires, about 30 km north of the City of Buenos Aires.

== Management ==
The British Cemetery Corporation of Buenos Aires is managed by an Honorary Committee and its goal is to serve the community.

== Notable burials ==
- Vasily (Wilhelm) Baumgarten (1879–1962) – Russian–Yugoslav architect
- Lucas Bridges (1874–1949) – Anglo-Argentine author
- Thomas Bridges (1842–1898) – Anglican missionary
- Frank Brown (1858–1943) – English clown
- Francis Drummond (1798–1827) – Naval officer who died in the Battle of Monte Santiago during the Cisplatine War
- Cecilia Grierson (1859–1934) – Physician, reformer and prominent freethinker
- Jennie Howard (1844–1933) – American prominent teacher
- Alexander Watson Hutton (1853–1936) – Founder of Argentine soccer
- Leopoldo Torre Nilsson (1924–1978) – Film director
- Mario Passano (1925–1995) – Actor
- Gordon Stretton (1887–1983) – Introduced jazz to South America and radio broadcaster
- Juan Bautista Thorne (1807–1885) – Colonel of the Argentine Army fought in battles at Pozos, Patagones, Martín García, Vuelta de Obligado and Quebracho.
- Liam Payne (1993–2024) – English singer and songwriter (One Direction). Temporarily interred before being repatriated to the United Kingdom.
- Ronald Scott (1917–2025) – Naval aviator
