= Susana Peper =

Argentine swimmer

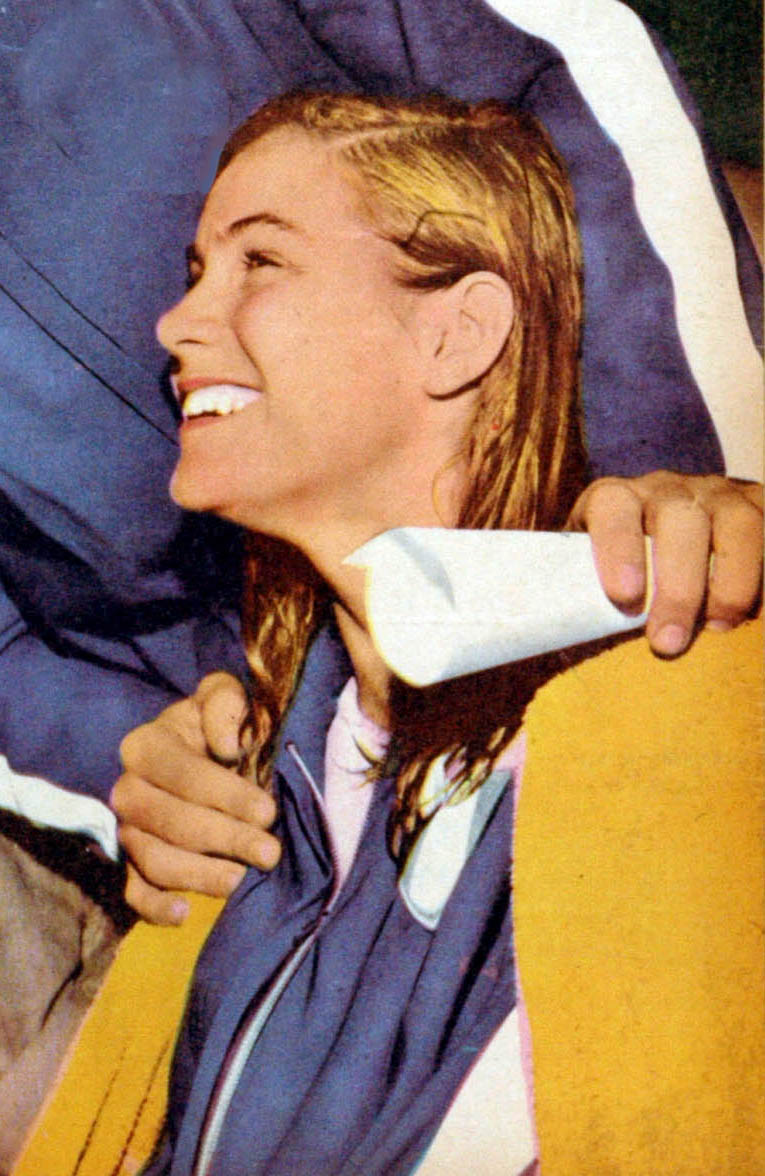
- Peper in 1964

Personal information
- Born: February 26, 1946 (age 79)

Sport
- Sport: Swimming

Susana Norma Peper Campbell (born February 26, 1946) is an Argentine swimmer. She competed in two events at the 1964 Summer Olympics.

== Early life and background ==
Peper is the daughter of Olympic swimmers Roberto Peper and Jeannette Campbell.
