= Glenn Postolski =

Argentine academic (1966–2024)

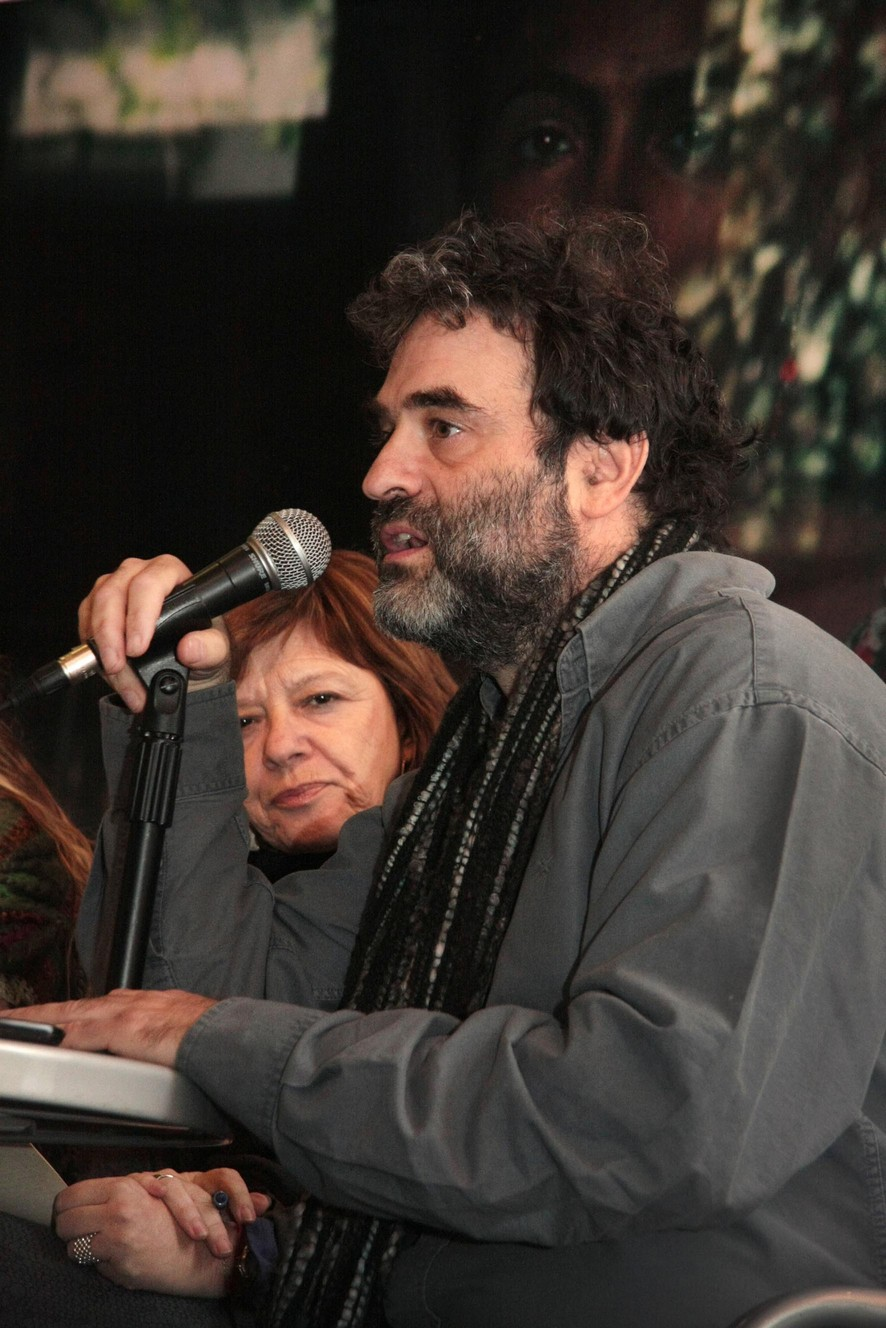
- Postolski in 2011
- Born: 9 August 1966
- Died: 25 February 2024 (aged 57)
- Occupations: Researcher and professor

Academic background
- Education: University of Buenos Aires and University of La Plata
- Alma mater: University of La Plata

Academic work
- Discipline: Communication studies
- Sub-discipline: Communication rights
- Institutions: University of Buenos Aires and National University of Lomas de Zamora
- Website: https://glennpostolski.wordpress.com/

Glenn Alvin Postolski (9 August 1966 – 25 February 2024) was an American-born Argentine researcher and academic who specialised in mass media policies and communication rights. Postolski served as dean of the Faculty of Social Sciences at the University of Buenos Aires from 2014 to 2018.

== Life and career ==
Glenn Alvin Postolski was born on 9 August 1966 in the United States. He then adopted Argentine nationality.

Postolski earned a bachelor's degree in communication sciences from the University of Buenos Aires, and a master's degree in Journalism and Media at the University of La Plata. He then became a professor at the National University of Lomas de Zamora.

Postolski was co-author of the 21 basic points for communication rights. He also advocated heavily for the passage of the Audiovisual Communication Services Law, which was approved by Argentine legislators on 10 October 2009.

In 2017, Postolski ran as a supporter of Kirchnerism in the election of the presidency to the La Plata university student council. He lost to a coalition of Peronists and Communists.

Postolski died unexpectedly on 25 February 2024, at the age of 57. He was cremated on the same day, and his remains now reside at La Chacarita Cemetery.
