= Richard Thompson (Maine politician) =

American politician

Richard H. Thompson

Member of the Maine House of Representatives from the 47th district
- In office December 7, 1994 – December 6, 2000
- Preceded by: Ernest C. Greenlaw
- Succeeded by: Philip Cressey Jr.

Personal details
- Born: June 25, 1947 (age 79)
- Party: Democratic
- Spouse: Becky
- Children: 2
- Education: Framingham State College (BA); Boston College (JD)

Military service
- Branch/service: United States Air Force
- Years of service: 1966–1970
- Rank: Staff Sergeant

Richard H. Thompson (born June 25, 1947) is an American politician and former lawyer from Maine.

== Education ==
Thompson is a graduate of Framingham State College and Boston College Law School.

== Military service ==
He served in the United States Air Force from 1966 to 1970 reaching the rank of Staff Sergeant.

== Legal career ==
He was admitted to the Massachusetts bar in 1981 and the Maine bar in 1982. He was co-founder of the firm Thompson & Peabody in Naples, Maine and also worked with the law firm of Doyle & Nelson in Augusta, Maine. In 2000 he founded Capitol Consulting LLC and engaged in lobbying and political consulting.

== Political career ==
A Democrat from Naples, Maine, Thompson served three terms (1994-2000) in the Maine House of Representatives. During his second and third terms, Thompson served as co-chair of the Judiciary Committee. Under his tenure, the Maine Legislature banned discrimination on the basis of sexual orientation statewide. Thompson was also instrumental in passage of legislation that provided compensation to former students who were abused at the State run Governor Baxter School for the Deaf. In 1998, Thompson voted with the majority in defeating a bill to legalize physician assisted suicide.

== Personal life ==
He has two children with his wife, Becky.
