= WDJM-FM =

- Framingham, Massachusetts; United States
- Frequency: 91.3 MHz

Programming
- Format: Variety

Ownership
- Owner: Framingham State University

History
- First air date: 1972; 54 years ago
- Former call signs: WFSB (1971–1973)
- Call sign meaning: D. Justin McCarthy, president in 1974 of Framingham State College

Technical information
- Licensing authority: FCC
- Facility ID: 22221
- Class: A
- ERP: 100 watts
- HAAT: 27.0 meters (88.6 ft)
- Transmitter coordinates: 42°17′44.3″N 71°26′16.2″W

Links
- Public license information: Public file; LMS
- Webcast: Listen live
- Website: fsuramradio.wixsite.com/wdjm

WDJM-FM (91.3 FM) is a radio station broadcasting a variety format. Licensed to Framingham, Massachusetts, United States, the station is owned by Framingham State University.

The station was first licensed in 1972. Originally called WFSB, the station received new calls on December 17, 1973, after a donation from Post-Newsweek Stations, which asked for the calls to replace those of WTIC-TV in Hartford, Connecticut, to honor the president of their television station group as WFSB (Channel 3). The new calls for WDJM, in turn, honored the then-president of Framingham State College, D. Justin McCarthy. In 1984, the station was granted a power increase to 100 watts and has been operating at this power ever since. The station is currently located on the 4th floor of the D. Justin McCarthy College Center. Sid Schweiger, IT manager of WRKO as well as WDJM's engineer has been working at WDJM for over 30 years.

WDJM offers a wide variety of student-run programming. DJs are granted two-hour time slots in which they can play an open format of music. Show formats range from classic rock, metal, electronic, dance, religious, reggae, hip-hop, sports, and more. When a show is not on the air, WDJM broadcasts programming from the Talking Information Center. Over the years, WDJM has hosted many events and activities on campus, ranging from dances to trivia nights to game nights and more. Beginning in the fall 2011 semester, WDJM began to stream its broadcasts on the internet.

In the spring of 2023, the Center for Student Experience began advising the station to consider becoming an online-only outlet. The station would conduct a year-long trial of not using its FM facility, its executive board citing the ability to not have to consider FCC regulations and facility maintenance.

As of October 3, 2024, a new antenna was installed and WDJM-FM is back to simultaneously streaming on air and online.

== See also ==
- Campus radio
- List of college radio stations in the United States
