= El hombre que murió dos veces =

Book by Enrique Sdrech

El hombre que murió dos veces is a non-fiction novel, written by Argentine journalist Enrique Sdrech. It was first published in January 1994.

In this novel, this specialist in police cases are covered in the newspaper Clarín and Channel 13, telling details of the Scandinaro case, one of the more elaborate scams that occurred in Argentina. With great mastery of the information, the author introduces the reader into a step by step story of how to keep the money from banks and insurance companies.

== Content ==
In August 1988 former police officer Daniel July Scandinaro quietly passed his days in a country house in Greater Buenos Aires, accompanied by an attractive blond woman. The happy couple were visiting some friends, who came in imported cars. Everything seemed normal ... except that the records of the Municipality of Mar del Plata show that Scandinaro had died and his body was cremated on 21 February that year.

Meanwhile two U.S. companies, to whom Scandinaro had assured her life, began to pay the amounts agreed. Two other insurance companies, one in Britain, one in Argentina, decided to change an investigation that soon becomes a race against time: if someone kills Scandinaro, everything will be useless.
