= Carlos Eduardo Gavito =

Argentine tango dancer

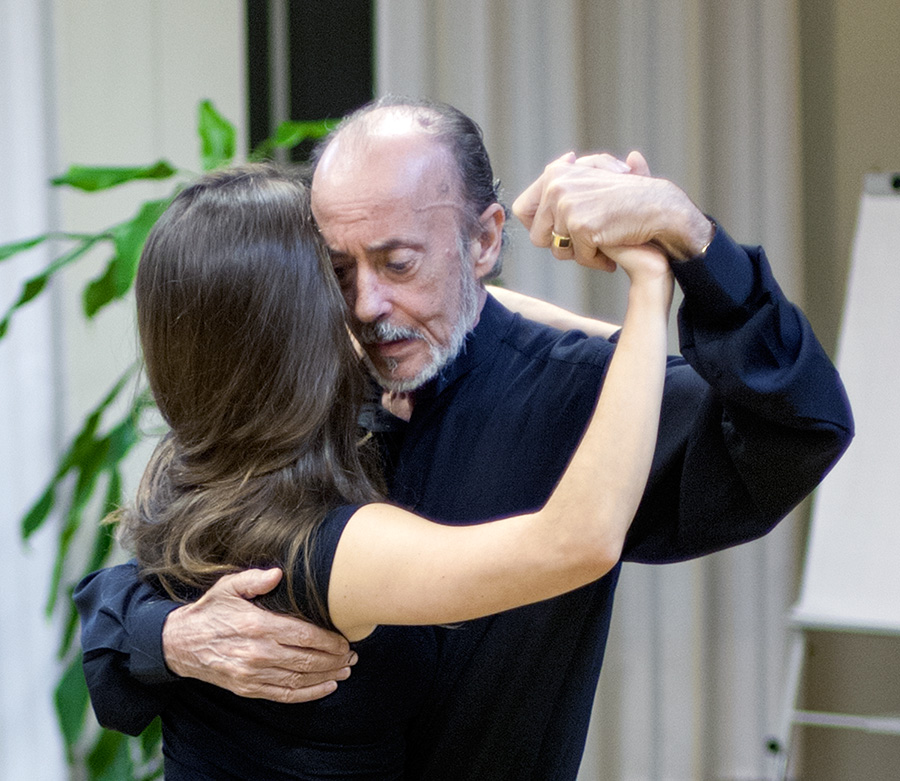
Gavito in 2004

Carlos Eduardo Gavito (April 27, 1942 – July 1, 2005) was an Argentine tango dancer.

In 1956 he started to dance in Buenos Aires, Argentina. In 1974 he worked with Juan Carlos Copes. He also traveled the world with his dance company and his dance partner and wife, Helen Gavito, who qualified at the Scottish Royal Ballet School. In 1995, he went to dance with Forever Tango, However, Helen was not invited to join him, as Luis Bravo, the Director of Forever Tango wanted only Argentinian dancers - which she was not. Throughout the 1990s, he was part of Forever Tango which played in eight US West Coast cities, increasing viewers' interest in learning how to dance the tango. Gavito was the only English-speaker in the company. Gavito's ultimate rise to fame came from his starring appearances in Forever Tango. He is buried in Cementerio de la Chacarita in Buenos Aires.
