= José Embrioni =

Argentine politician (1906–1996)

63rd Mayor of Buenos Aires
- In office 30 August 1973 – 23 March 1976
- Preceded by: Juan Debenedetti
- Succeeded by: Eduardo Crespi (interim)

Personal details
- Born: 19 March 1906 Buenos Aires, Argentina
- Died: 14 April 1996 (aged 90) Buenos Aires, Argentina
- Party: Justicialist Party
- Education: Colegio Militar de la Nación

Military service
- Branch/service: Argentine Army
- Years of service: 1927–1955
- Rank: General de división

José Embrioni (19 March 1906 – 14 April 1996) was an Argentine military official and politician who served as intendente (mayor) of Buenos Aires from 1973 to 1976, appointed by President Raúl Lastiri, until his resignation in the face of the 1976 coup d'état.

== Early life and career ==
He graduated at the top of his class from the Colegio Militar de la Nación in 1927, beginning his career as an infantry officer. Between 1943 and 1944, during the dictatorship of Pedro Pablo Ramírez, he served as Secretary-General of the Ministry of Foreign Affairs and Worship. Later, under Juan Domingo Perón's government, he participated in Argentina's delegation to the 1947 Inter-American Conference in Rio de Janeiro as a lieutenant colonel.

== Political career ==
Embrioni's diplomatic career continued with a posting to the Argentine Embassy in the United States from 1948 to 1949. Upon his return, he served as secretary to Minister of War Humberto Sosa Molina until his retirement in 1955 with the rank of major general. His decision to remain loyal to Perón during the 1955 coup d'état, orchestrated by the Armed Forces, put him at odds with fellow Army colonels, as exemplified by an letter dated 12 July 1955 signed by diplomat Mario Amadeo. Embrioni was one of the military officials who alerted Perón of the imminent bombing of Plaza de Mayo, allowing the president to take cover in the Libertador Building and survive the attack.

Following nearly two decades in retirement, he was unexpectedly recalled to public service during Argentina's transition to democracy in the 1970s. On 30 August 1973, interim president Raúl Lastiri appointed him Mayor of Buenos Aires, a position he retained after Juan Perón's return to the presidency in October 1973 and during Isabel Perón's subsequent administration.

His tenure as mayor coincided with one of Argentina's most politically volatile periods, marked by increasing violence between political factions. Though his administration was relatively brief, it represented a continuation of military influence in civilian government during this era. Notably, his administration saw the finalization of Avenida 9 de Julio.

He pre-emptively resigned from office only two days before the consummation of the 1976 coup d'état and he largely disappeared from public life during the subsequent military dictatorship, which lasted until 1983.

== Death and legacy ==
Embrioni died in Buenos Aires on 14 April 1996, aged 90. His funeral was attended by prominent political figures including President Carlos Menem and Buenos Aires Mayor Jorge Domínguez. He was interred at La Chacarita Cemetery.

Political offices
Preceded by Juan Debenedetti	Mayor of Buenos Aires; 1973–1976	Succeeded by Eduardo Crespi
