= Framingham State University =

Public university in Framingham, Massachusetts, US

- Former name: List: Normal School in Lexington (1839–1844); Normal School in West Newton (1844–1845); State Normal School in West Newton (1845–1853); State Normal School in Framingham (1853–1865); Framingham Normal School (1865–1889); Framingham State Normal School (1889–1932); State Teachers College at Framingham (1932–1945); Framingham State Teachers College (1945–1960); State College at Framingham (1960–1965); Framingham State College (1965–2010)
- Motto: Live to the Truth
- Type: Public university
- Established: 1839; 187 years ago
- Accreditation: NECHE
- Academic affiliations: Space-grant
- Endowment: $35 million (2020)
- President: Nancy Niemi
- Vice-president: Lorretta Holloway
- Provost: Kristen Porter-Utley
- Dean: Meg Nowak
- Faculty: 301 (189 full-time, 112 part-time)
- Students: 3,529 (Fall 2025)
- Undergraduates: 2,640 (Fall 2025)
- Postgraduates: 889 (Fall 2025)
- Location: Framingham, Massachusetts, 01701, U.S. 42.2977°N 71.4366°W
- Campus: Suburban, 143 acres (58 ha)
- Newspaper: The Gatepost
- Colors: FSU Gold and FSU Black
- Nickname: Rams
- Sporting affiliations: NCAA Division III, Massachusetts State Collegiate Athletic Conference, Little East Conference
- Mascot: Sam the Ram
- Website: framingham.edu
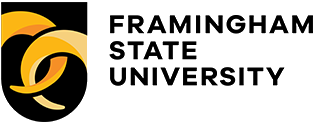

Framingham State University (Framingham State or FSU) is a public university in Framingham, Massachusetts. The university, previously known as the Normal School in Lexington was founded in 1839 as the first state-supported normal school in the United States before becoming a full-fledged university. It offers undergraduate programs as well as graduate programs, including MBA, MEd, and MS.

== History ==
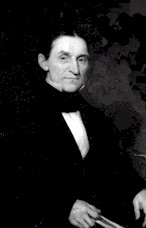
Cyrus Peirce, first president

As the first secretary of the newly created Board of Education in Massachusetts, Horace Mann instituted school reforms that included the creation of an experimental normal school, the first one in the United States, in Lexington, in July 1839. The initial name of the school was the "Normal School in Lexington". Cyrus Peirce was its first principal or president.

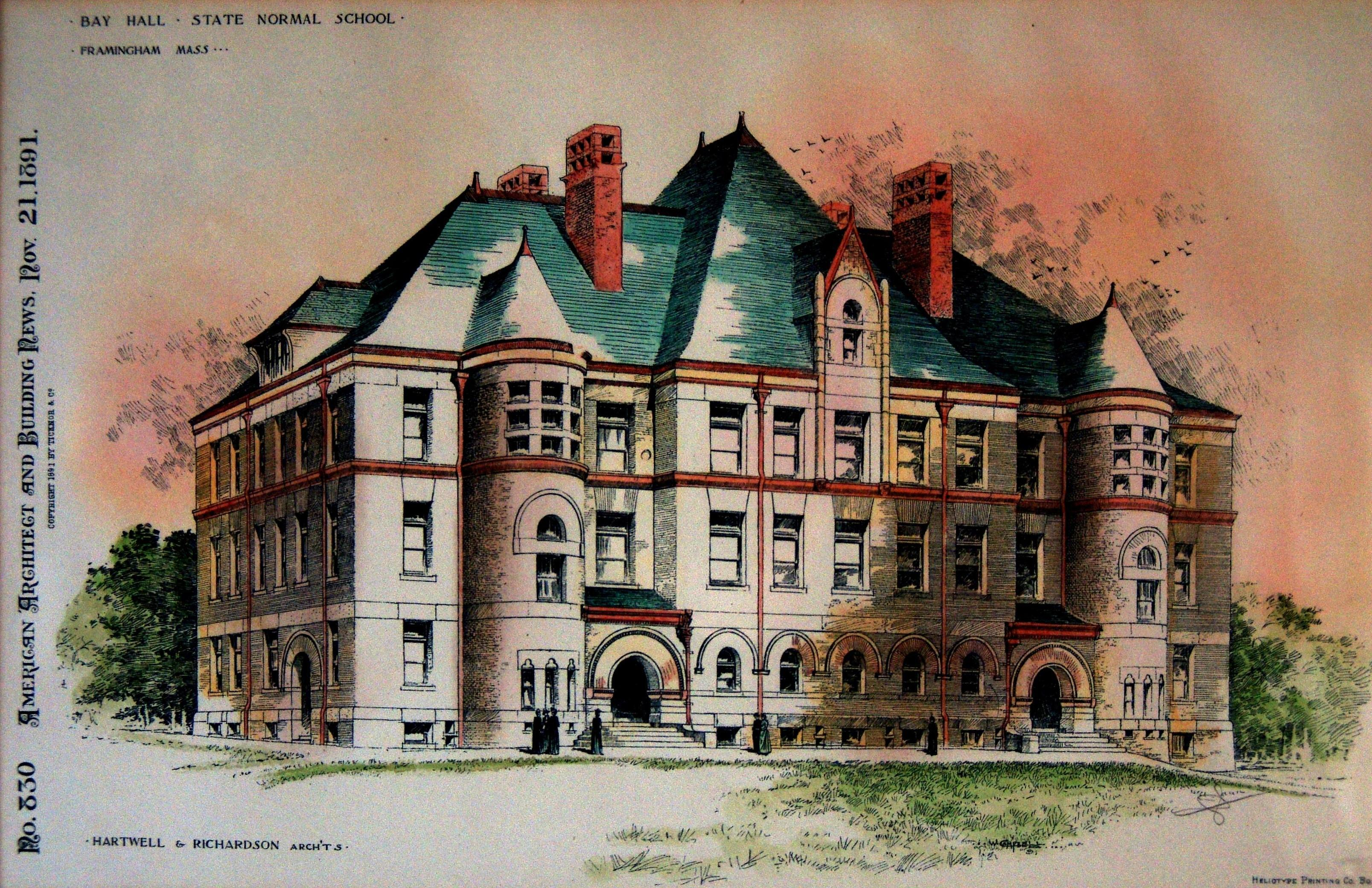
May Hall, 19th-century architectural rendering

A second normal school was opened in September 1839 in Barre (the school later moved to Westfield) followed by Bridgewater State College the next year. Growth forced the first normal school's relocation to West Newton in 1843, where it was first named the "Normal School in West Newton" before changing again to the "State Normal School in West Newton" two years later in 1845.

The school would last in West Newton for only ten years before moving to its present site on Bare Hill in Framingham in 1853. At this time, the school became the "State Normal School in Framingham". Nevertheless, the school would change its name two more times in its first decades in Framingham, becoming "Framingham Normal School" in 1865 and "Framingham State Normal School" in 1889. In 1922, the school granted its first Bachelor of Science in Education degrees in conjunction with its adoption of a four-year study program. Ten years later, all Massachusetts' normal schools were renamed state teachers colleges, with degreed teachers predominating its graduating classes; the school thus became the "State Teachers College at Framingham". This name, however, would last only until 1945 when it was slightly adjusted to the "Framingham State Teachers College".

Readable pdf of The Dial yearbook from 1916

In 1960, the name changed yet again to the "State College at Framingham" after Bachelor of Arts degrees were added. This name was slightly adjusted five years later to just "Framingham State College", the name it would subsequently take into the twenty-first century. In subsequent years, Masters' of Education, Arts, and Science degrees were added as well, which remain a part of the school's curriculum today. In 2007, the college began offering the Master's of Business Administration (MBA) degree. In October 2010, seven of the state colleges became state universities, unaffiliated with the University of Massachusetts system. At this time, the school adopted its current name: Framingham State University. The measure was signed into law by Massachusetts governor Deval Patrick on July 28, 2010.

== Campus ==
The 73-acre (30 ha) campus is located in Framingham, Massachusetts. Seven residence halls house over 1,500 students. The Henry Whittemore Library has over 200,000 volumes, Wi-Fi, access to over 70,000 electronic journals, and includes Archives and Special Collections. Framingham State University is located on the 282-foot (86-meter) high Bare Hill (also known as Normal Hill) and provides views of Boston, Massachusetts 20 miles (32 kilometers) away.

=== Sustainability ===
In 2007, the school signed the American College and University Presidents Climate Commitment. That year, Massachusetts issued Executive Order No. 484, which mandated reductions in greenhouse gas emissions and energy consumption for all state agencies and institutions. Greenhouse gases must be reduced 80% by 2050. In 2010, the school adopted a plan to convert its heating plant to natural gas and to convert its central chilled water plant to electric chillers.

Framingham State University was named a "Green College" by the Princeton Review in 2010 and 2011. It was one of 22 schools in Massachusetts to receive the distinction, and one of 311 nationwide. It was named to the list again in 2013.

== Organization ==
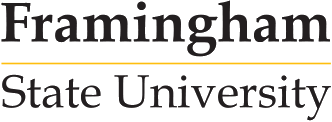
The old logo for Framingham State University used until May 2023

Framingham State University is led by an eleven-member Board of Trustees. The governor appoints nine trustees to five-year terms, renewable once. The Framingham State University Alumni Association elects one trustee for a single five-year term. Finally, the student body elects one student trustee for a one-year term. In addition to five full board meetings each year, which are open to the public, the board also meets in standing committees.

The university's annual budget is $105 million, and the school has 775 full and part-time employees. Framingham State University is accredited by the New England Commission of Higher Education.

== Student life ==
Academic rankings

Regional
- U.S. News & World Report: 1. 103 (tied in North)

Undergraduate demographics as of Fall 2023
Race and ethnicity	Total
White	53%
Hispanic	21%
Black	17%
Two or more races	5%
Asian	3%
International student	1%
Economic diversity
Low-income (Note: The percentage of students who received an income-based federal Pell grant intended for low-income students.)	38%
Affluent (Note: The percentage of students who are a part of the American middle class at the bare minimum.)	62%

Framingham State University has an Office of Student Involvement and Leadership Development and a Center for Inclusive Excellence. It has a relatively small campus which sits on roughly 77 acres (31 ha). Framingham State University also owns and operates a radio station WDJM-FM on 91.3 FM.

=== Enrollment ===
Total enrollment (Fall 2021): 4,495 total (3,213 undergraduate and 1,282 graduate students)

- Men: 44% (1,398 students)
- Women: 56% (1,815 students)
- Commuters (degree seeking full-time undergraduates only): 53% (1,445 students)
- Residents (degree seeking full-time undergraduates only): 47% (1,279 students)

=== Athletics ===
Framingham State University fields 14 varsity athletic teams (6 men's and 8 women's) competing at the NCAA Division III level and 4 club athletic teams (1 men's, 2 women's, 1 co-ed) that compete in various leagues. The athletic teams are known as the Framingham State Rams.

== Notable alumni ==
- Anna Brackett, nineteenth century philosopher, educator
- Sarah B. Capron, evangelical missionary
- Olivia A. Davidson, co-founder of Tuskegee Institute and wife of Booker T. Washington
- Lucie Caroline Hager, (1853–1903), author
- Jennie Howard, member of a pioneering group of educators who founded normal schools in Argentina
- Mary Swift Lamson and Sarah Wight, teachers of Laura Bridgman at the Perkins Institute for the Blind
- Paul J. LeBlanc, President of Southern New Hampshire University; former President of Marlboro College
- Christa McAuliffe (Class of 1970), astronaut, participant in Teacher in Space Project, died in Space Shuttle Challenger disaster. Center and memorial on campus in McAuliffe's honor.
- Brian J. Moran, Chair of the Democratic Party of Virginia
- Joshua Onujiogu, NFL linebacker
- Rebecca Pennell, first woman college professor in the United States, and niece of Horace Mann
- Charlotte Champe Stearns, mother of T. S. Eliot.
- Richard Thompson, Member of the Maine House of Representatives
- Adam Scanlon, American politician serving as a member of the Massachusetts House of Representatives
- Ella Josephine Spooner, professor at Simmons College
- Ruth Graves Wakefield, inventor of the chocolate chip cookie
- Electa Nobles Lincoln Walton (1824–1908), educator, lecturer, writer, and suffragist
- Jacob Oliveira, American politician serving as a member of the Massachusetts State Senate.
