= Ella Josephine Spooner =

American educator (1875–1973)

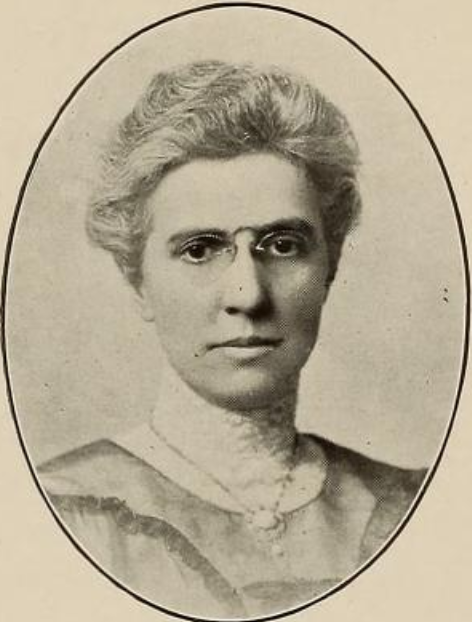
- Spooner, from the 1913 yearbook of Simmons College
- Born: September 3, 1875; Hudson, Massachusetts, U.S.
- Died: June 10, 1973 (age 97); East Orange, New Jersey, U.S.
- Occupations: College professor, home economist

Ella Josephine Spooner (September 3, 1875 – June 10, 1973) was an American educator based in Boston. She taught needlework at Perkins School for the Blind, and was a professor of clothing in the home economics department at Simmons College from 1906 to 1924.

== Early life and education ==
Spooner was born in Hudson, Massachusetts, the daughter of John Louis Spooner and Marilla Evora Harlow Spooner. She graduated from Framingham Normal School and was a member of the first graduating class from Simmons College.

== Career ==
Spooner taught at Perkins School for the Blind from 1896 to 1904. She was Helen Keller's proctor at Radcliffe College. She taught needle arts and clothing classes in the home economics department of Simmons College from 1906 to 1924. She was a panelist at the fourth annual meeting of the American Home Economics Association in 1911.

After Simmons, Spooner worked for a bias tape manufacturer and for Union Laundry in New York. She spoke to community groups about her work, and judged sewing competitions. She spoke at a conference at Pratt Institute in 1933.

== Publications ==
- Hapgood's School Needlework (1922, revised original work by Olive C. Hapgood)

== Personal life ==
Later in life Spooner and her brother Edwin owned an antique store together in Maine. Edwin died in 1950. Spooner moved to New Jersey in 1927, and died in 1973, at the age of 97, in East Orange, New Jersey.
