= Enrique Sdrech =

Argentine writer (1928–2003)

Enrique Osvaldo Sdrech (1928–2003) was an Argentine writer of Syrian origin. journalist and investigative reporter, best known for his true crime stories.

== Works ==
- Esta es mi verdad (1982).
- 37 puñaladas para Oriel Briant (1986).
- El hombre que murió dos veces (1994).
- ¿Quién mató a Silvia Angélica Cicconi?
- Giubileo un caso abierto
