= Roberto Peper =

Argentine swimmer

Personal information
- Full name: Roberto Guillermo Peper
- Nationality: Argentine
- Born: June 27, 1913 Buenos Aires, Argentina
- Died: July 3, 1999 (aged 86) Buenos Aires, Argentina
- Height: 190 cm (6 ft 3 in)
- Spouse: Jeannette Campbell

Sport
- Sport: Swimming

Roberto Guillermo Peper (June 27, 1913 – July 3, 1999) was an Argentine swimmer who competed in the 1932 Summer Olympics.

He was born and died in Buenos Aires. He was the husband of Jeannette Campbell and father of Susana Peper.

== Career ==
In 1932 he was a member of the Argentine relay team which finished sixth in the 4 x 200 metre freestyle relay event.
