= Frank Brown (entertainer) =

Argentinian circus performer

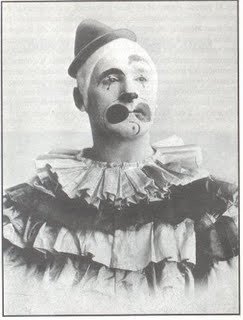
Brown in 1920.

Frank Brown (6 September 1858 Brighton, England – 9 April 1943, Buenos Aires, Argentina) was a clown, acrobat and circus entrepreneur with a long career in Argentina, where he was known as El Payaso Inglés (The English Clown).

== Career ==
Coming from a circus family where both his father and grandfather had been clowns, Brown performed acrobatics and clowning from childhood, and was part of tours to Moscow and Mexico.

He arrived in Buenos Aires in 1884 when he was around 26 and worked in the Brothers Carlo circus. He took the name Pepino el 88 while performing with the criollo clown, José Podestá. After an accident in 1893 he only performed as a clown. In 1910 he was part of a performance to celebrate the Argentine centenary, but the tent was destroyed by arson.

Some of his those who admired his art were Roberto Payró and Carlos Pellegrini. Rubén Darío wrote about him:

Franck Brown como los Hanlon Lee

sabe lo trágico de un paso

de payaso y es para mí

un buen jinete de Pegaso.

Salta del circo al cielo raso;

Banville le hubiera amado así;

Franck Brown, como los Hanlon Lee

sabe lo trágico de un paso....

(Franck Brown as the Hanlon Lee

knows how tragic a step

as a clown and it's for me

a good Pegasus rider.

Jump from the circus to the ceiling;

Banville would have loved him like that;

Franck Brown, as the Hanlon Lee

he knows how tragic a step ... )

== Personal life ==
He retired in 1924 and lived with his wife, Ecuyere, Rosita of La Plata (Rosalia Robba) who had been married to Antonio Podestá, one of the nine Podestá Brothers.

He died in Buenos Aires at the age of 84. He is buried in the British Cemetery.
