= Jeannette Campbell =

Argentine swimmer (1916–2003)

Jeanette Campbell
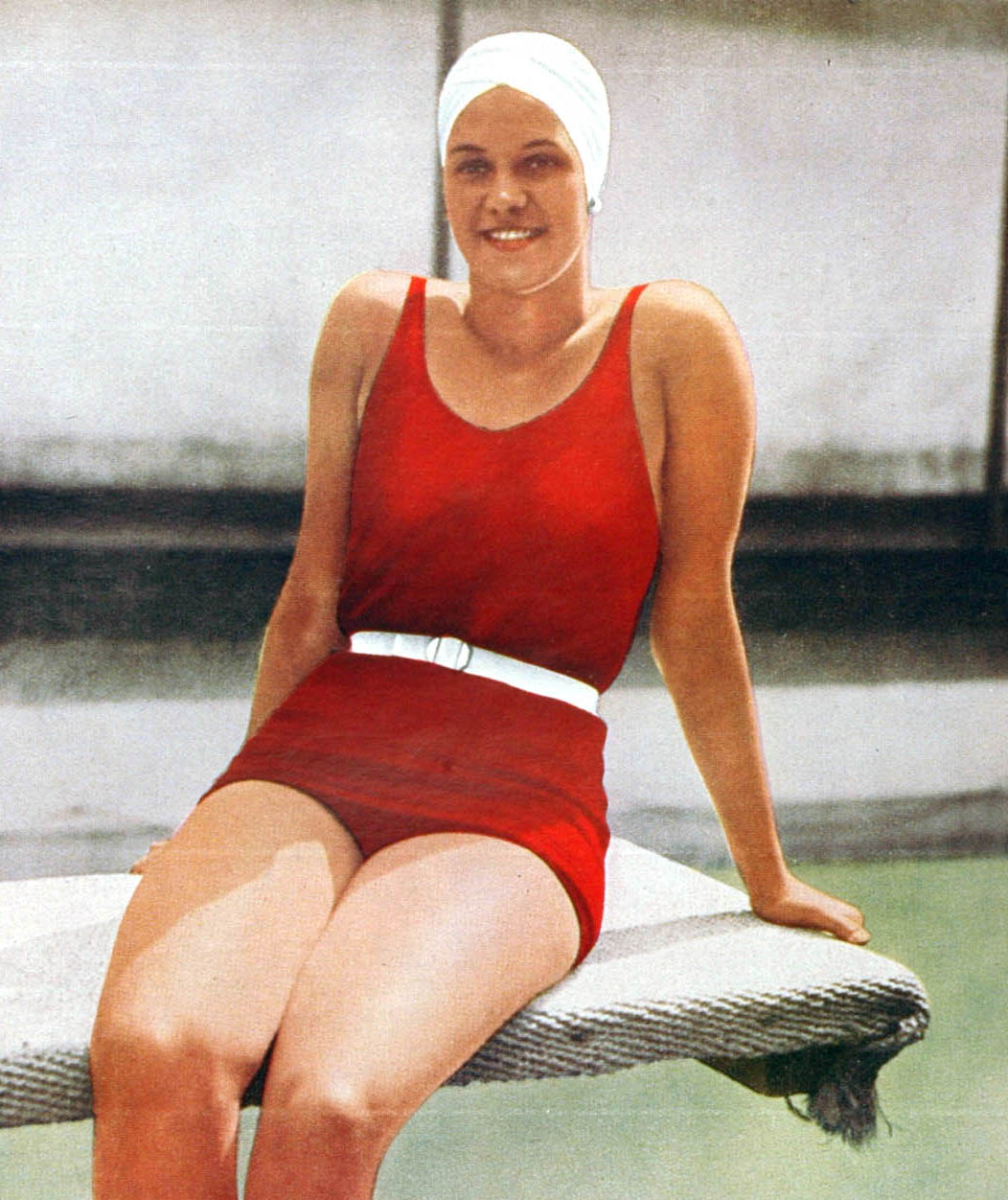
- Campbell in 1934

Personal information
- Born: 8 March 1916 Saint-Jean-de-Luz, France
- Died: 15 January 2003 (aged 86) Buenos Aires, Argentina
- Spouse: Roberto Peper

Sport
- Sport: Swimming
Medal record
Representing Argentina
Women's Swimming
Olympic Games
Silver medal – second place	1936 Berlin	100 m freestyle

Jeannette Morven Campbell (8 March 1916 – 15 January 2003) was a naturalized Argentine swimmer who won the silver medal in the 1936 Summer Olympics. She was the first Argentine female to participate at the Olympic Games. and the first to win a silver medal in 100 metre freestyle.

Along her career, Campbell won 12 South American titles and 13 Argentine titles. She is regarded as one of the most notable Argentine female athletes of all time.

== Early life ==
She was born in Saint-Jean-de-Luz, France, when her parents were traveling through Europe. Her father, John, was Scottish. She became an Argentine citizen after the family moved to the neighborhood of Belgrano in the city of Buenos Aires.

== Career ==
Campbell started her sporting career at Belgrano Athletic Club, where she met Ricardo Peper, who later became his coach and husband.

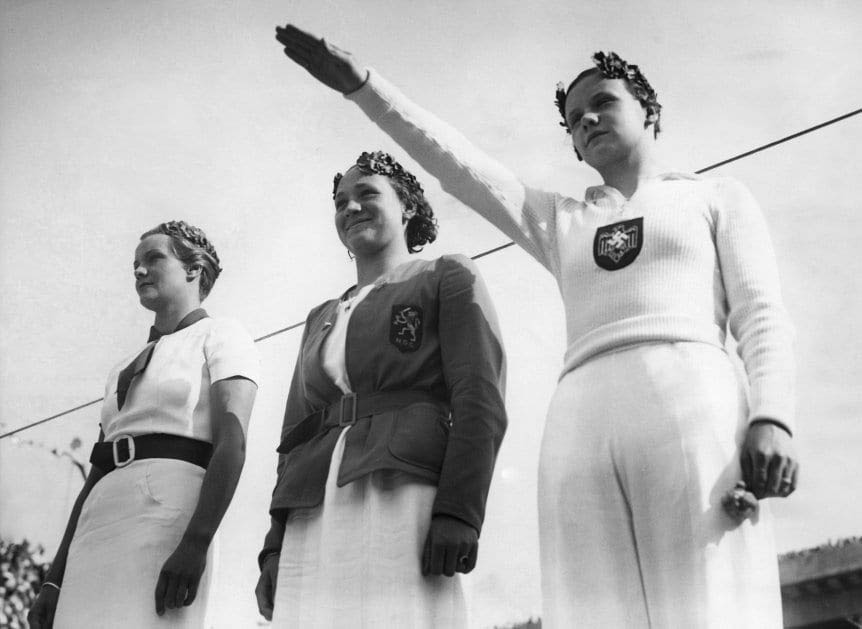
Campbell (left) in the 1936 Olympics podium along with Mastenbroek and Arendt (who is giving the Nazi salute)

Her sister, Dorothy, was Argentina's 100 m freestyle champion. She followed her sister to become the Argentine record holder in 100 m in 1932, with a 1:18:6 time. In 1935, she became the South American record holder in the 100 m (1:08:0) and in the 400 m. During the 1936 Olympics, she broke the 100 m Olympic record in the semifinals with a 1:06:6 time. She finished second to Hendrika Mastenbroek in the final 100 meters swim, with a 1:06:4 time.

During the trip on ship to Berlin (that took 21 days) Campbell trained in the swimming pool of the boat in order to arrive in top physical condition for the competition.

She was the flag bearer for Argentina at the opening ceremony of the 1964 Summer Olympics held in Tokyo, Japan.

Campbell died in Belgrano in 2003 at 86 years old. She was mother of two girls, Inés and Susana (who also became an Olympian in 1964), and a boy, Roberto Jr. Her legacy and accomplishments were recognised with his induction into the International Swimming Hall of Fame in 1991.

The swimming pool of CeNARD complex was named after Campbell. Her accomplishments and honors paved the road for future female athletes that competed and won medals at the Summer Olympics such as Noemí Simonetto (long jumps in 1948), Gabriela Sabatini (tennis in 1988), Serena Amato (yachting in 2000), Georgina Bardach (swimming in 2004), Paula Pareto (judo in 2008 and 2016), among others.
