= List of public domain tangos =

This is intended to be a list of public domain tangos. Argentine law protects copyright for 70 years after the date of the song's publication.

Authorship works registered with SADAIC can be looked up at their web site.

According to Argentine law 11723, text and music can be considered as separate works.

Title	Composer	Poet	reg.authority	Genre
A Mitre	Carlos Gardel	Carlos Gardel	not found in SADAIC	
Alma porteña	Vicente Greco	Ernesto Temes		
Ámame mucho	Ángel Villoldo	Ángel Villoldo		zamba
Amargura	Carlos Gardel	Alfredo Le Pera		tango
Ansias de amor	Guillermo Desiderio Barbieri	Guillermo Desiderio Barbieri		
Apure, delantero buey	Carlos Gardel	Alfredo Le Pera		canción
Aquel muchacho triste	José Pedro De Grandis	José Pedro De Grandis	not found in SADAIC	tango
Argentina	Vicente Greco	Vicente Greco	not found in SADAIC	
Arrabal amargo	Carlos Gardel	Alfredo Le Pera		tango
Calandria	Ángel Villoldo	Ángel Villoldo	not found in SADAIC	tango
Caminito soleado	Carlos Gardel	Alfredo Le Pera		canción criollo
Canción de 1870	Manuel Acuña	Manuel Acuña		
Cantando cantando	Benjamín Alfonso Tagle Lara	Benjamín Alfonso Tagle Lara	not found in SADAIC	
Cantar eterno	Ángel Villoldo	Ángel Villoldo	not found in SADAIC	canción / tango
Cheating muchachita	Carlos Gardel	Alfredo Le Pera	not found in SADAIC	
Corazón de indio	Augusto Gentile	Juan Andrés Caruso	not found in SADAIC	tango
Criollita, decí que sí	Carlos Gardel	Alfredo Le Pera		canción
Cuerpo de alambre	Ángel Villoldo	Ángel Villoldo	not found in SADAIC	tango
Cuesta abajo	Carlos Gardel	Alfredo Le Pera		tango
Cuidado con los cincuenta = Cuidado con los 50	Ángel Villoldo	Ángel Villoldo		tango
Cuyanita	Carlos Gardel	Carlos Gardel		
Deje que la acompañe	Augusto Gentile	Augusto Gentile	not found in SADAIC	
Desdichas	Augusto Gentile	Pascual Contursi	not found in SADAIC	tango
Dos cartas	Carlos Gardel	Carlos Gardel	not found in SADAIC	
Fierro chifle	Carlos Gardel	Carlos Gardel	not found in SADAIC	
Flor de fango	Augusto Gentile	Pascual Contursi	not found in SADAIC	tango
Golondrinas	Carlos Gardel	Alfredo Le Pera		tango
Guitarra, guitarra mía	Carlos Gardel	Alfredo Le Pera		estilo?cancion
Idilio campero	Guillermo Desiderio Barbieri	Guillermo Desiderio Barbieri		
La bicicleta	Ángel Villoldo	Ángel Villoldo		tango
La criolla	Carlos Gardel	Alfredo Le Pera		canción
La madrugada	Saúl Salinas	Saúl Salinas		
La mañanita	Carlos Gardel	Carlos Gardel		
La milonguera	Vicente Greco	Vicente Greco		
La pastora	Saúl Salinas	Saúl Salinas		
La percanca esta triste	Vicente Greco	Vicente Greco		tango
La promesa	Ángel Villoldo	Ángel Villoldo		vidalita
La rosa encarnada	Saúl Salinas	Saúl Salinas		
La vida en un trago	Carlos Gardel	Alfredo Le Pera		
Lejana tierra mía	Carlos Gardel	Alfredo Le Pera		canción
Llegué a ladrón por amarte	Juan Félix Maglio (Pacho) [J.Oglima]	Juan Félix Maglio (Pacho) [J.Oglima]		tango
Loca	Manuel Jovés	Antonio Viergol		tango
Los Panchos en Buenos Aires	Carlos Gardel	Alfredo Le Pera		
Mar bravio - lobo de mar	Guillermo Desiderio Barbieri	Guillermo Desiderio Barbieri		tango
Mi Buenos Aires querido	Carlos Gardel	Alfredo Le Pera		tango
Mi estrella	Saúl Salinas	Saúl Salinas		
Mi guitarra	Vicente Greco	Juan Andrés Caruso		
¡Mi mamá lo va a saber!	Juan Félix Maglio (Pacho) [J.Oglima]	Juan Andrés Caruso		
Mi noche triste	Samuel Castriota	Pascual Contursi		tango
Mirala como se va	Saúl Salinas	Saúl Salinas		tonada
Nido de amor	Samuel Castriota	Juan Andrés Caruso		
Nogoyá	Juan Félix Maglio (Pacho) [J.Oglima]	Juan Félix Maglio (Pacho) [J.Oglima]		
Ojos negros	Vicente Greco	Vicente Greco		
Olvido	Carlos Gardel	Alfredo Le Pera		estilo
Pamperito	Ángel Villoldo	Ángel Villoldo		tango
Pancho comprate un rancho!	Benjamín Alfonso Tagle Lara	Benjamín Alfonso Tagle Lara		
Pata de palo	Benjamín Alfonso Tagle Lara	Benjamín Alfonso Tagle Lara		
Por tu boca roja	Carlos Gardel	Alfredo Le Pera		tango
Por una cabeza	Carlos Gardel	Alfredo Le Pera		tango
Puente Alsina	Benjamín Alfonso Tagle Lara	Benjamín Alfonso Tagle Lara		tango
Qué querés con esa cara! / La guitarrita	Eduardo Arolas	Pascual Contursi		tango
Quejas del alma	Guillermo Desiderio Barbieri	Guillermo Desiderio Barbieri		
Quién tuviera dieciocho años / 18 años	Guillermo Desiderio Barbieri	Guillermo Desiderio Barbieri		tango
Quiéreme	Carlos Gardel	Alfredo Le Pera		canción
Recuerdo malevo	Carlos Gardel	Alfredo Le Pera		tango
Rosa de fuego	Manuel Jovés	Antonio Viergol		
Rubias de New York	Carlos Gardel	Alfredo Le Pera		foxtrot
Soledad	Carlos Gardel	Alfredo Le Pera		tango
Soy tremendo	Ángel Villoldo	Ángel Villoldo		tango
Suerte negra	Carlos Gardel	Alfredo Le Pera		vals
Sus ojos se cerraron	Carlos Gardel	Alfredo Le Pera		tango
Tan grande y tan sonzo	Alfredo Le Pera	Carlos Gardel		tango
Tu vieja ventana	Guillermo Desiderio Barbieri	Guillermo Desiderio Barbieri		vals
Tus violetas	Guillermo Desiderio Barbieri	Guillermo Desiderio Barbieri		
Una más	Manuel Jovés	Antonio Viergol		tango cuplé
Una rosa para mi rosa	Saúl Salinas	Saúl Salinas		canción
Viejos tiempos	Carlos Gardel	Alfredo Le Pera		tango milonga
Volver	Carlos Gardel	Alfredo Le Pera		tango
Volvió una noche	Carlos Gardel	Alfredo Le Pera		tango
Zaraza	Benjamín Alfonso Tagle Lara	Benjamín Alfonso Tagle Lara		tango
El Choclo	Ángel Villoldo			tango
El Porteñito	Ángel Villoldo			milonga
El Torito	Ángel Villoldo			milonga
Yunta brava	Ángel Villoldo			tango

== See also ==
- List of works by Manuel Romero
