= Let's Dance (Slovak TV series) season 1 =

Let's Dance
- Season 1
- Presented by: Martin "Pyco" Rausch; Adela Banášová; Bruno Ciberej
- Judges: Jozef Bednárik; Dagmar Hubová; Elena Jágerská; Ján Ďurovčík
- Celebrity winner: Zuzana Fialová
- Professional winner: Peter Modrovský
- No. of episodes: 10

Release
- Original network: Markíza
- Original release: 8 October – 10 December 2006

Series chronology
- Next → Season 2

Let's Dance aired its first series on Markíza from 8 October 2006 to 10 December 2006. The series was presented by Martin "Pyco" Rausch and Adela Banášová and co-hosted by Bruno Ciberej. The judging panel consisted of Jozef Bednárik, Dagmar Hubová, Elena Jágerská and Ján Ďurovčík.

On 10 December 2006, actress Zuzana Fialová and Peter Modrovský were announced as the winners, while Olympic sprint canoer Juraj Bača and Barbora Jančinová finished as the runners-up.

== Format ==
The couples dance each week in a live show. The judges score each performance out of ten. The couples are then ranked according to the judges' scores and given points according to their rank, with the lowest scored couple receiving one point, and the highest scored couple receiving the most points (the maximum number of points available depends on the number of couples remaining in the competition). The public are also invited to vote for their favourite couples, and the couples are ranked again according to the number of votes they receive, again receiving points; the couple with the fewest votes receiving one point, and the couple with the most votes receiving the most points.

The points for judges' score and public vote are then added together, and the two couples with the fewest points are placed in the bottom two. If two couples have equal points, the points from the public vote are given precedence.

== Couples ==
The ten couples featuring selected celebrities and their dancing partners:

Celebrity	Occupation / Known for	Dance partner	Status
Fero Mikloško	Fashion designer	Kristína Kamenická	Eliminated 1st on October 15, 2006
Jan Novotný	The Bachelor star	Marcela Spišiaková	Eliminated 2nd on October 22, 2006
Jozef Golonka	Former ice hockey player	Lujza Tarajová	Eliminated 3rd on October 29, 2006
Kateřina Brožová	Czech actress, singer	Matej Chren	Eliminated 4th on November 5, 2006
Helena Vondráčková	Czech singer	Milan Plačko	Eliminated 5th on November 12, 2006
Maroš Kramár	Actor	Denisa Halická	Eliminated 6th on November 19, 2006
Marianna Ďurianová	Newsreader	Erik Ňarjaš	Eliminated 7th on November 26, 2006
Tomáš Bezdeda	Singer	Mirka Kosorínová	Eliminated 8th on December 3, 2006
Juraj Bača	Olympic sprint canoer	Barbora Jančinová	Runner-up on December 10, 2006
Zuzana Fialová	Actress	Peter Modrovský	Winner on December 10, 2006

== Scoring chart ==
The highest score each week is indicated in bold green with a dagger (†), while the lowest score each week is indicated in italicized red with a double-dagger (‡).

Color key:

Winners
Runners-up
Bottom two
Eliminated

Let's Dance (season 1) - Weekly scores
Couple	Pl.	Week										
Couple	Pl.	1	2	1+2	3	4	5	6	7	8	9	10
Zuzana & Peter	1st	22	29	**51**†	**30**†	26	**34**†	**35**†	29+34=**63**†	35+40=**75**†	36+38=**74**†	40+40+39=**119**†
Juraj & Barbora	2nd	14‡	22	36	26	24	29	25‡	31+30=61	30+36=66‡	31+34=65	40+35+33=108‡
Tomáš & Mirka	3rd	20	20	40	23	24	28	30	24+28=52‡	34+32=66‡	31+29=60‡	
Marianna & Erik	4th	**25**†	23	48	25	27	26	32	27+34=61	36+34=70		
Maroš & Denisa	5th	16	23	39	22	28	25‡	27	29+30=59			
Helena & Milan	6th	20	**30**†	50	21	**31**†	**34**†	28				
Kateřina & Matej	7th	22	23	45	22	22	27					
Jozef & Lujza	8th	16	19	35‡	18‡	20‡						
Jan & Marcela	9th	19	19	38	21							
Fero & Kristína	10th	22	18‡	40								

== Weekly scores ==
Unless indicated otherwise, individual judges scores in the charts below are given (in parentheses) in this order from left to right: Jozef Bednárik, Dagmar Hubová, Elena Jágerská, Ján Ďurovčík.

=== Week 1 ===
Couples performed either the cha-cha-cha or the waltz, and are listed in the order they performed.

Couple	Scores	Dance	Music
Helena & Milan	20 (6,5,4,5)	Cha-cha-cha	"Something Got Me Started" — Simply Red
Juraj & Barbora	14 (4,4,5,1)	Waltz	"Come Away with Me" — Norah Jones
Tomáš & Mirka	20 (5,5,6,4)	Cha-cha-cha	"Stand by Me" — Ben E. King
Zuzana & Peter	22 (6,6,5,5)	Waltz	"Angels" — Robbie Williams
Fero & Kristína	22 (6,5,6,5)	Cha-cha-cha	"Sex Bomb" — Tom Jones
Jozef & Lujza	16 (4,4,5,3)	Waltz	"Three Times A Lady" — Commodores
Kateřina & Matej	22 (6,6,5,5)	Cha-cha-cha	"Everlasting Love" — Sandra
Marianna & Erik	25 (7,7,6,5)	Waltz	"Moon River" — Audrey Hepburn
Jan & Marcela	19 (5,5,5,4)	Cha-cha-cha	"Lady Marmalade" — Labelle
Maroš & Denisa	16 (4,4,4,4)	Waltz	"Hero" — Enrique Iglesia

=== Week 2 ===
Couples performed either the quickstep or the rumba, and are listed in the order they performed.

Couple	Scores	Dance	Music	Result
Marianna & Erik	23 (5,6,6,6)	Rumba	"The Lady in Red" — Chris de Burgh	Safe
Jan & Marcela	19 (4,5,5,5)	Quickstep	"I'm So Excited" — The Pointer Sisters	Safe
Zuzana & Peter	29 (7,8,7,7)	Rumba	"Love Is the Answer" — England Dan & John Ford Coley	Safe
Tomáš & Mirka	20 (6,6,4,4)	Quickstep	"You're the One That I Want" — John Travolta & Olivia Newton-John	Safe
Maroš & Denisa	23 (6,6,6,5)	Rumba	"When You Say Nothing at All" — Keith Whitley	Safe
Kateřina & Matej	23 (6,6,5,6)	Quickstep	"It Don't Mean a Thing (If It Ain't Got That Swing)" — Duke Ellington	Safe
Jozef & Lujza	19 (5,5,5,4)	Rumba	"I Don't Want to Miss a Thing" — Aerosmith	Safe
Fero & Kristína	18 (5,5,4,4)	Quickstep	"Nah Neh Nah" — Vaya Con Dios	Eliminated
Juraj & Barbora	22 (5,6,6,5)	Rumba	"Feelings" — Morris Albert	Safe
Helena & Milan	30 (9,8,6,7)	Quickstep	"Cabaret" — Liza Minnelli	Safe

=== Week 3 ===
Couples performed either the jive or the tango, and are listed in the order they performed.

Couple	Scores	Dance	Music	Result
Tomáš & Mirka	23 (6,6,6,5)	Jive	"Jailhouse Rock" — Elvis Presley	Safe
Maroš & Denisa	22 (5,6,6,5)	Tango	"Hernando's Hideaway" — Carol Haney	Safe
Kateřina & Matej	22 (5,5,6,6)	Jive	"Reach" — S Club 7	Safe
Jozef & Lujza	18 (5,4,5,4)	Tango	"La cumparsita" — Gerardo Matos Rodríguez	Safe
Marianna & Erik	25 (7,6,7,5)	Jive	"Mambo No. 5" — Pérez Prado	Safe
Juraj & Barbora	26 (6,7,7,6)	Tango	"El Choclo" — Ángel Villoldo	Safe
Jan & Marcela	21 (5,5,6,5)	Jive	"Proud Mary" — Creedence Clearwater Revival	Eliminated
Helena & Milan	21 (6,5,5,5)	Tango	"Objection (Tango)" — Shakira	Safe
Zuzana & Peter	30 (7,8,8,7)	Jive	"I'm Still Standing" — Elton John	Safe

=== Week 4 ===
Couples performed either the slowfox or the paso doble, and are listed in the order they performed.

Couple	Scores	Dance	Music	Result
Zuzana & Peter	26 (6,7,7,6)	Slowfox	"Fever" — Little Willie John	Safe
Maroš & Denisa	28 (7,7,7,7)	Paso doble	"España cañí" — Pascual Marquina Narro	Safe
Kateřina & Matej	22 (5,6,5,6)	Slowfox	"Theme from New York, New York" — Frank Sinatra	Safe
Helena & Milan	31 (8,8,7,8)	Paso doble	"Pasodobles" — Pepe El Trompeta	Safe
Tomáš & Mirka	24 (7,7,5,5)	Slowfox	"Have You Met Miss Jones?" — George Shearing	Safe
Jozef & Lujza	20 (5,5,5,5)	Paso doble	"Paso Doble Rhythm" — Ballroom Orchestra & Singers	Eliminated
Marianna & Erik	27 (7,6,7,7)	Slowfox	"I've Got You Under My Skin" — Frank Sinatra	Safe
Juraj & Barbora	24 (6,6,7,5)	Paso doble	"Spanish Flamenco Matadors" — Ambros Seelos	Safe

=== Week 5 ===
Couples performed the samba, and are listed in the order they performed.

Couple	Scores	Dance	Music	Result
Kateřina & Matej	27 (7,7,7,6)	Samba	"Livin' la Vida Loca" — Ricky Martin	Eliminated
Juraj & Barbora	29 (8,8,7,6)	Samba	"Ain't It Funny" — Jennifer Lopez	Safe
Zuzana & Peter	34 (9,9,8,8)	Samba	"Conga" — Miami Sound Machine	Safe
Maroš & Denisa	25 (7,6,6,6)	Samba	"Tic, Tic Tac" — Carrapicho	Safe
Helena & Milan	34 (9,9,8,8)	Samba	"Mas que nada" — Jorge Ben	Safe
Tomáš & Mirka	28 (7,7,7,7)	Samba	"Tequila" — The Champs	Safe
Marianna & Erik	26 (7,7,6,6)	Samba	"Bailamos" — Enrique Iglesias	Safe

=== Week 6 ===
Each couple performed unlearned routine and group Viennese waltz, and are listed in the order they performed.

Couple	Scores	Dance	Music	Result
Maroš & Denisa Zuzana & Peter Juraj & Barbora	No scores received	Viennese waltz	"Sous le ciel de Paris" — Jean Bretonnière	
Helena & Milan	28 (7,7,7,7)	Jive	"Just a Gigolo" — Louis Prima	Eliminated
Marianna & Erik	32 (8,8,8,8)	Cha-cha-cha	"I Need to Know" — Marc Anthony	Safe
Tomáš & Mirka	30 (8,7,8,7)	Rumba	"Spanish Eyes" — Engelbert Humperdinck	Safe
Juraj & Barbora	25 (7,6,6,6)	Cha-cha-cha	"Gentleman" — Lou Bega	Safe
Maroš & Denisa	27 (7,6,7,7)	Jive	"Wake Me Up Before You Go-Go" — Wham!	Safe
Zuzana & Peter	35 (9,8,9,9)	Cha-cha-cha	"Smooth" — Santana ft. Rob Thomas	Safe
Marianna & Erik Helena & Milan Tomáš & Mirka	No scores received	Viennese waltz	"Delilah" — Tom Jones	

=== Week 7 ===
Each couple performed unlearned Standard routine and the salsa, and are listed in the order they performed.

Couple	Scores	Dance	Music	Result
Zuzana & Peter	29 (7,8,7,7)	Quickstep	"I'm So Excited" — The Pointer Sisters	Safe
Zuzana & Peter	34 (8,9,8,9)	Salsa	"Hot! Hot! Hot!" — Salsa Swingers	Safe
Marianna & Erik	27 (8,6,6,7)	Salsa	"Hey Jude" — The Beatles	Safe
Marianna & Erik	34 (9,8,8,9)	Quickstep	"Sing, Sing, Sing (with a Swing)" — Louis Prima	Safe
Juraj & Barbora	31 (7,8,8,8)	Slowfox	"The Pink Panther Theme" — Henry Mancini	Safe
Juraj & Barbora	30 (8,8,7,7)	Salsa	"La Bomba" — Ricky Martin	Safe
Maroš & Denisa	29 (7,8,7,7)	Salsa	"Cambio Dolor" — Natalia Oreiro	Eliminated
Maroš & Denisa	30 (8,7,7,8)	Slowfox	"L'Italiano" — Toto Cutugno	Eliminated
Tomáš & Mirka	24 (6,6,6,6)	Waltz	"Love Ain't Here Anymore" — Take That	Safe
Tomáš & Mirka	28 (7,7,7,7)	Salsa	"Juana la Loca" - David Álvarez Y Juego De Manos	Safe

=== Week 8 ===
Each couple performed one unlearned Latin routine and a relay consisting of 2 Standard dances, and are listed in the order they performed.

Couple	Scores	Dance	Music	Result
Juraj & Barbora	30 (8,7,8,7)	Jive	"Long Tall Sally" — Little Richard	Safe
Juraj & Barbora	36 (9,9,9,9)	Waltz/Tango relay	Italian classical music medley	Safe
Zuzana & Peter	35 (9,9,9,8)	Waltz/Quickstep relay	"Non, je ne regrette rien" & "Milord" — Édith Piaf	Safe
Zuzana & Peter	40 (10,10,10,10)	Paso doble	"Olé España" — Tanz Orchester Klaus Hallen	Safe
Tomáš & Mirka	34 (8,8,9,9)	Paso doble	"Niña Bonita" — Manolo Castillo Yebra	Safe
Tomáš & Mirka	32 (8,8,8,8)	Waltz/Viennese waltz relay	"Caribbean Blue" & "Only Time" — Enya	Safe
Marianna & Erik	36 (9,9,9,9)	Waltz/Viennese waltz relay	"Nocturne" — Secret Garden	Eliminated
Marianna & Erik	34 (9,8,8,9)	Paso doble	"Sangre Caliente" — The Dancelife Orchestra	Eliminated

=== Week 9: Semi-finals ===
Each couple performed one Standard routine and a redemption Latin routine, and are listed in the order they performed.

Couple	Scores	Dance	Music	Result
Tomáš & Mirka	31 (8,8,7,8)	Cha-cha-cha	"It's So Easy!" — The Crickets	Eliminated
Tomáš & Mirka	29 (8,7,7,7)	Tango	"Bésame Mucho" — Consuelo Velázquez	Eliminated
Zuzana & Peter	36 (9,9,9,9)	Tango	"Una lacrima sul viso" — Bobby Solo	Safe
Zuzana & Peter	38 (10,10,9,9)	Rumba	"Sign Your Name" — Terence Trent D'Arby	Safe
Juraj & Barbora	31 (8,8,8,7)	Samba	"Quando quando quando" — Tony Renis & Emilio Pericoli	Safe
Juraj & Barbora	34 (9,9,8,8)	Quickstep	"(Get Your Kicks on) Route 66" — Nat King Cole	Safe
Tomáš & Mirka Zuzana & Peter Juraj & Barbora	No scores received	Jive	Jumpin' Jive tap dance	

=== Week 10: Finale ===
Each couple performed three routines: Argentine tango, their favorite Latin dance and their freestyle routine. Couples are listed in the order they performed.

Couple	Scores	Dance	Music	Result
Juraj & Barbora	40 (10,10,10,10)	Argentine tango	"Hernando's Hideaway" — Carol Haney	Runners-up
Juraj & Barbora	35 (9,9,9,8)	Salsa	"La Bomba" — Ricky Martin	Runners-up
Juraj & Barbora	33 (8,9,9,7)	Freestyle	"You Never Can Tell" — Chuck Berry	Runners-up
Zuzana & Peter	40 (10,10,10,10)	Argentine tango	"La cumparsita" — Gerardo Matos Rodríguez	Winners
Zuzana & Peter	40 (10,10,10,10)	Paso doble	"Olé España" — Tanz Orchester Klaus Hallen	Winners
Zuzana & Peter	39 (10,9,10,10)	Freestyle	"(I've Had) The Time of My Life" — Bill Medley & Jennifer Warnes	Winners

== Dance chart ==
The couples performed the following each week:

- Week 1: One unlearned dance (cha-cha-cha or waltz)
- Week 2: One unlearned dance (quickstep or rumba)
- Week 3: One unlearned dance (jive or tango)
- Week 4: One unlearned dance (slowfox or paso doble)
- Week 5: Samba
- Week 6: One unlearned dance & Viennese waltz group dance
- Week 7: One unlearned Standard dance & salsa
- Week 8: One unlearned Latin dance and Standard dance relay
- Week 9: One unlearned Standard routine, redemption Latin routine & Jive group dance
- Week 10: Argentine tango, favorite Latin dance and freestyle routine

Let's Dance (season 1) - Dance chart
Couple	Week																
Couple	1	2	3	4	5	6		7		8		9			10		
Zuzana & Peter	Waltz	Rumba	Jive	Slowfox	Samba	Cha-cha-cha	Group; Viennese waltz	Quickstep	Salsa	Waltz/Quickstep relay	Paso doble	Tango	Rumba	Group; Jive	Argentine tango	Paso doble	Freestyle
Juraj & Barbora	Waltz	Rumba	Tango	Paso doble	Samba	Cha-cha-cha	Group; Viennese waltz	Slowfox	Salsa	Jive	Waltz/Tango relay	Samba	Quickstep	Group; Jive	Argentine tango	Salsa	Freestyle
Tomáš & Mirka	Cha-cha-cha	Quickstep	Jive	Slowfox	Samba	Rumba	Group; Viennese waltz	Waltz	Salsa	Paso doble	Waltz/Viennese waltz relay	Cha-cha-cha	Tango	Group; Jive			
Marianna & Erik	Waltz	Rumba	Jive	Slowfox	Samba	Cha-cha-cha	Group; Viennese waltz	Salsa	Quickstep	Waltz/Viennese waltz relay	Paso doble						
Maroš & Denisa	Waltz	Rumba	Tango	Paso doble	Samba	Jive	Group; Viennese waltz	Salsa	Slowfox								
Helena & Milan	Cha-cha-cha	Quickstep	Tango	Paso doble	Samba	Jive	Group; Viennese waltz										
Kateřina & Matej	Cha-cha-cha	Quickstep	Jive	Slowfox	Samba												
Jozef & Lujza	Waltz	Rumba	Tango	Paso doble													
Jan & Marcela	Cha-cha-cha	Quickstep	Jive														
Fero & Kristína	Cha-cha-cha	Quickstep															
