= Uruguayan tango =

Type of dance

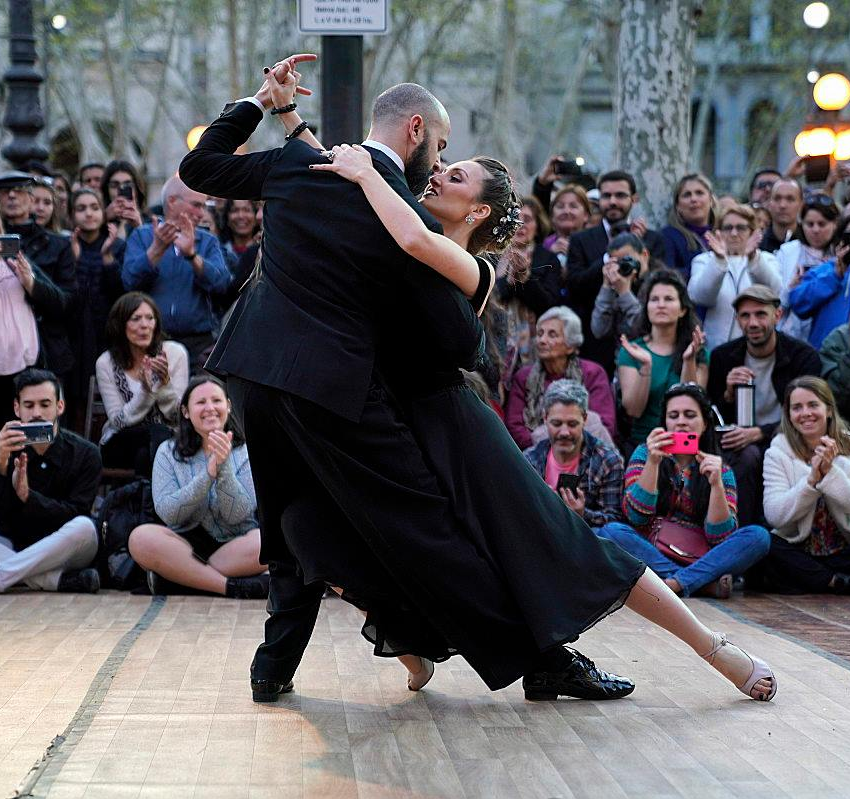
Tango dancers in Montevideo.

Uruguayan tango is a rhythm that has its roots in the poor areas of Montevideo around 1880. Then it was extended to other areas and countries. As Borges said: "...tango is African-Montevidean [Uruguayan], tango has black curls in its roots..." He quoted Rossi, that sustained that "...tango, that argentine people call argentine tango, is the son of the Montevidean milonga and the grandson of the habanera. It was born in the San Felipe Academy [Montevideo], a Montevidean warehouse used for public dances, among gangsters and black people; then it emigrated to underworld areas of Buenos Aires and fooled around in Palermo's rooms..." This also implies that different forms of dance were originated in the neighborhoods of Montevideo, Uruguay in the last part of the 19th century and in the early 20th century that was particular from that area and different from Buenos Aires. It consists of a variety of styles that developed in different regions of Argentina and Uruguay.

The dance is often accompanied by several musical forms such as:

- Tango
- Milonga
- Vals
- Candombe

One of the most famous and well-known tango songs is La Cumparsita, written by Gerardo Matos Rodríguez in Montevideo in 1919. An annual week-long festival to mark the anniversary of La Cumparsita has taken place in Montevideo since 2007. The Tango Museum of Montevideo currently stands where La Cumparsita was first played, in Palacio Salvo.

== Musicians ==
Famous Uruguayan tango musicians include:

- Manuel Campoamor
- Francisco Canaro
- Horacio Ferrer, Uruguayan poet who contributed the lyrics to many important tango songs.
- Malena Muyala
- Gerardo Matos Rodríguez
- Enrique Saborido
- Julio Sosa, "El Varón del Tango" or "The Man of Tango"
- Bajofondo Tango Club, a music group made up of seven members from Uruguay and Argentina.
