= Làm Lại Từ Đầu =

Studio album by Lâm Nhật Tiến
- Released: March 1998
- Genre: Pop
- Length: 56:59
- Label: Asia
- Producer: Thy Vân, Trúc Hồ, Lâm Nhật Tiến

Lâm Nhật Tiến chronology
Yêu Em Âm Thầm (1997)	Làm Lại Từ Đầu (1998)	Mãi Yêu Người Thôi (2001)

Làm Lại Từ Đầu is the third studio album by Vietnamese American singer Lâm Nhật Tiến was released on March 3. 1998, under the music label Asia Entertainment Inc. The album is one of the best-selling albums by the year of Asia Entertainment Inc. It was published on Asia's video 31: Giải Âm Nhạc Nghệ Thuật Asia (2000).

== Music and production ==
This album contains 10 tracks, plus one bonus track: "Đỉnh Gió Hú". It was a big hit by Lam at the beginning of the year 1998.

Also, including the tracks: "Đừng Nhắc Đến Tình Yêu" & "Về Đâu Hỡi Em" (written by Truc Ho), "Ngày Em Đi", "Tình Yêu Như Mũi Tên" (a Vietnamese version of a popular song: El Choclo, Vietnamese Lyrics by Tran Ngoc Son), "Shalala", "Người Tình Ơi Đừng Xa" (Original: I Love You, a popular Korean pop song was written by Han Dong Joon), "Những Màu Kỷ Niệm" (Original: Eye in the Sky by The Alan Parsons Project, a duet with Le Tam) and "I Could Love Again" (an English song was written by Vu Tuan Duc).

Music videos by Lam Nhat Tien performing the songs: "Đừng Nhắc Đến Tình Yêu" and "Về Đâu Hỡi Em" were released on Asia's video 17: Những Tiếng Hát Hôm Nay (1999) and Asia's video 20: Tình Ca Mùa Thu (1998).

== Track listing ==
No.	Title	Writer(s)	Arranger(s)	Length
1.	"Đừng Nhắc Đến Tình Yêu"	Trúc Hồ	Trúc Hồ	3:11
2.	"Làm Lại Từ Đầu"	Trúc Hồ	Trúc Hồ	3:31
3.	"Nhớ Đến Em"	Trúc Hồ	Trúc Hồ	3:42
4.	"Những Màu Kỷ Niệm (Original: Eye in the Sky)"	Khúc Lan (Original: Alan Parsons, Eric Woolfson)	Sỹ Đan	4:37
5.	"Tình Yêu Như Mũi Tên (Original: El Choclo)"	Trần Ngọc Sơn (Original: Ángel Villoldo)	Trúc Sinh	4:12
6.	"Shalala (Original: Sha-La-La-La-La)"	Khúc Lan (Original: Torben Lendager, Poul Dehnhardt)	Trúc Sinh	4:13
7.	"Người Tình Ơi Đừng Xa (Original: I Love You)"	Khúc Lan (Original: Han Dong Joon)	Trúc Sinh	4:22
8.	"Về Đâu Hỡi Em"	Trúc Hồ	Trúc Hồ	5:15
9.	"I Could Love Again"	Vũ Tuấn Đức	Vũ Tuấn Đức	3:52
10.	"Đỉnh Gió Hú"	Trúc Hồ	Trúc Hồ	4:37
11.	"Ngày Em Đi"	Trung Nhật/Nhật Trung	Trúc Sinh	5:22
