= Let's Dance (Slovak TV series) season 2 =

Let's Dance
- Season 2
- Presented by: Martin "Pyco" Rausch; Adela Banášová; Bruno Ciberej
- Judges: Jozef Bednárik; Tatiana Drexler; Zuzana Fialová; Ján Ďurovčík
- Celebrity winner: Michaela Čobejová
- Professional winner: Tomáš Surovec
- No. of episodes: 10

Release
- Original network: Markíza
- Original release: 27 April – 29 June 2008

Season chronology
- ← Previous; Season 1 Next → Season 3

Let's Dance aired its second series on Markíza from 27 April 2008 to 29 June 2008. The series was presented by Martin "Pyco" Rausch and Adela Banášová and co-hosted by Bruno Ciberej. The judging panel consisted of Jozef Bednárik, Tatiana Drexler, Zuzana Fialová and Ján Ďurovčík.

On 29 June 2008, actress Michaela Čobejová and Tomáš Surovec were announced as the winners, while Olympic snowboarder Radoslav Židek and Silvia Kadnárová finished as the runners-up.

== Format ==
The couples dance each week in a live show. The judges score each performance out of ten. The couples are then ranked according to the judges' scores and given points according to their rank, with the lowest scored couple receiving one point, and the highest scored couple receiving the most points (the maximum number of points available depends on the number of couples remaining in the competition). The public are also invited to vote for their favourite couples, and the couples are ranked again according to the number of votes they receive, again receiving points; the couple with the fewest votes receiving one point, and the couple with the most votes receiving the most points.

The points for judges' score and public vote are then added together, and the two couples with the fewest points are placed in the bottom two. If two couples have equal points, the points from the public vote are given precedence.

== Couples ==
The ten couples featuring selected celebrities and their dancing partners:

Celebrity	Occupation / Known for	Dance partner	Status
Milan Markovič	Actor, humorist	Michaela Marková	Eliminated 1st on May 4, 2008
Silvia Šarköziová	Violinist	Karol Brüll	Eliminated 2nd on May 11, 2008
Martin Konrád	Singer	Ivana Surovcová	Eliminated 3rd on May 18, 2008
Marta Sládečková	Actress	Juraj Fáber	Eliminated 4th on May 25, 2008
Miriam Kalisová	Newsreader	Ladislav Gerényi	Eliminated 5th on June 1, 2008
Rastislav Žitný	Newsreader	Veronika Husárová	Eliminated 6th on June 8, 2008
Jozef Vajda	Actor	Katarína Štumpfová	Eliminated 7th on June 15, 2008
Andrea Verešová	Miss Slovakia 1999	Petr Čadek	Eliminated 8th on June 22, 2008
Radoslav Židek	Olympic snowboarder	Silvia Kadnárová	Runner-up on June 29, 2008
Michaela Čobejová	Actress	Tomáš Surovec	Winner on June 29, 2008

== Scoring chart ==
The highest score each week is indicated in bold green with a dagger (†), while the lowest score each week is indicated in italicized red with a double-dagger (‡).

Color key:

Winners
Runners-up
Bottom two
Eliminated

Let's Dance (season 2) - Weekly scores
Couple	Pl.	Week										
Couple	Pl.	1	2	1+2	3	4	5	6	7	8	9	10
Michaela & Tomáš	1st	16	24	40	19	17	30	27	24+37=61	25+35=60	31+40=71‡	32+38+40=**110**†
Radoslav & Silvia	2nd	23	**25**†	**48**†	26	16	**31**†	31	27+36=63	28+33=61	39+38=**77**†	38+32+40=**110**†
Andrea & Petr	3rd	**25**†	22	47	23	**23**†	29	**33**†	35+34=**69**†	35+29=**64**†	39+37=76	
Jozef & Katarína	4th	10‡	19	29‡	19	13‡	22‡	24‡	25+21=46‡	26+27=53‡		
Rastislav & Veronika	5th	19	20	39	25	18	27	28	30+35=65			
Miriam & Ladislav	6th	19	17	36	**32**†	20	27	25				
Marta & Juraj	7th	17	21	38	18‡	20	23					
Martin & Ivana	8th	11	**25**†	36	23	16						
Silvia & Karol	9th	18	14‡	32	19							
Milan & Michaela	10th	16	14‡	30								

== Weekly scores ==
Unless indicated otherwise, individual judges scores in the charts below are given (in parentheses) in this order from left to right: Jozef Bednárik, Tatiana Drexler, Zuzana Fialová, Ján Ďurovčík.

=== Week 1 ===
Couples performed either the cha-cha-cha or the waltz, and are listed in the order they performed.

Couple	Scores	Dance	Music
Miriam & Ladislav	19 (3,6,6,4)	Waltz	"Nothing Compares 2 U" — Sinéad O'Connor
Radoslav & Silvia	23 (6,5,7,5)	Cha-cha-cha	"Kiss" — Prince
Silvia & Karol	18 (4,5,5,4)	Waltz	"I Wonder Why" — Curtis Stigers
Marta & Juraj	17 (5,4,5,3)	Cha-cha-cha	"I'm Outta Love" — Anastacia
Rastislav & Veronika	19 (5,5,5,4)	Waltz	"Ne me quitte pas" — Jacques Brel
Jozef & Katarína	10 (3,3,3,1)	Cha-cha-cha	"The Shoop Shoop Song (It's in His Kiss)" — Cher
Martin & Ivana	11 (2,3,4,2)	Waltz	"Are You Lonesome Tonight?" — Elvis Presley
Michaela & Tomáš	16 (4,4,5,3)	Cha-cha-cha	"Se qua a parón?" — Pappa Pedro
Milan & Michaela	16 (7,1,5,3)	Waltz	"Più che puoi" — Eros Ramazzotti & Cher
Andrea & Petr	25 (7,6,7,5)	Cha-cha-cha	"Sway" — Shaft

=== Week 2 ===
Couples performed either the quickstep or the rumba, and are listed in the order they performed.

Couple	Scores	Dance	Music	Result
Milan & Michaela	14 (4,4,4,2)	Rumba	"One" — U2	Eliminated
Marta & Juraj	21 (6,5,6,4)	Quickstep	"Hit That Jive, Jack!" — John Pizzarelli	Safe
Rastislav & Veronika	20 (5,6,5,4)	Rumba	"Shape of My Heart" — Sting	Safe
Andrea & Petr	22 (6,6,5,5)	Quickstep	"Walkin' Back to Happiness" — Helen Shapiro	Safe
Miriam & Ladislav	17 (6,4,4,3)	Rumba	"Out of Reach" — Gabrielle	Safe
Jozef & Katarína	19 (6,4,5,4)	Quickstep	"Puttin' On the Ritz" — Harry Richman	Safe
Silvia & Karol	14 (4,3,4,3)	Rumba	"The NeverEnding Story" — Limahl	Safe
Michaela & Tomáš	24 (7,7,6,4)	Quickstep	"Lady Madonna" — The Beatles	Safe
Martin & Ivana	25 (6,7,7,5)	Rumba	"Another Day in Paradise" — Phil Collins	Safe
Radoslav & Silvia	25 (7,7,7,4)	Quickstep	"Walking on Sunshine" — Katrina and the Waves	Safe

=== Week 3 ===
Couples performed either the jive or the tango, and are listed in the order they performed.

Couple	Scores	Dance	Music	Result
Michaela & Tomáš	19 (5,5,5,4)	Jive	"Waterloo" — ABBA	Safe
Rastislav & Veronika	25 (5,7,7,6)	Tango	"Owner of a Lonely Heart" — Yes	Safe
Radoslav & Silvia	26 (7,7,7,5)	Jive	"These Boots Are Made for Walkin'" — Nancy Sinatra	Safe
Marta & Juraj	18 (5,4,5,4)	Tango	"Hot Stuff" — Donna Summer	Safe
Silvia & Karol	19 (5,5,5,4)	Jive	"You Wanna Be Americano" — Lou Bega	Eliminated
Jozef & Katarína	19 (6,4,5,4)	Tango	"Čo sa mi môže stať" — Gejza Dusík	Safe
Andrea & Petr	23 (6,6,6,5)	Jive	"Maria" — Blondie	Safe
Miriam & Ladislav	32 (8,9,8,7)	Tango	"Santa Maria" — Gotan Project	Safe
Martin & Ivana	23 (6,6,6,5)	Jive	"Candyman" — Christina Aguilera	Safe

=== Week 4 ===
Couples performed either the slowfox or the paso doble, and are listed in the order they performed.

Zuzana Fialová missed this episode due to an work obligations, so the couples were judged on a 30-point scale instead of the usual 40-point scale.

Couple	Scores	Dance	Music	Result
Miriam & Ladislav	20 (7,7,6)	Paso doble	"Malagueña" — Ernesto Lecuona	Safe
Radoslav & Silvia	16 (6,5,5)	Slowfox	"Raindrops Keep Fallin' on My Head" — B. J. Thomas	Safe
Marta & Juraj	20 (7,7,6)	Paso doble	"España cañí" — Pascual Marquina	Safe
Andrea & Petr	23 (8,8,7)	Slowfox	"Sunny" — Bobby Hebb	Safe
Jozef & Katarína	13 (5,4,4)	Paso doble	"Eye of the Tiger" — Survivor	Safe
Martin & Ivana	16 (5,6,5)	Slowfox	"I Wanna Be Loved by You" — Helen Kane	Eliminated
Rastislav & Veronika	18 (6,7,5)	Paso doble	"España" — Paso Doble / 60 Bpm	Safe
Michaela & Tomáš	17 (6,6,5)	Slowfox	"One" — A Chorus Line	Safe

=== Week 5 ===
Couples performed the samba, and are listed in the order they performed.

Couple	Scores	Dance	Music	Result
Andrea & Petr	29 (7,7,8,7)	Samba	"Carnaval" — DJ Méndez	Safe
Marta & Juraj	23 (6,6,6,5)	Samba	"Whenever, Wherever" — Shakira	Eliminated
Miriam & Ladislav	27 (7,6,7,7)	Samba	"Canción del mariachi" — Antonio Banderas	Safe
Michaela & Tomáš	30 (9,8,7,6)	Samba	"Bootylicious" — Destiny's Child	Safe
Rastislav & Veronika	27 (7,7,7,6)	Samba	"You'll Be Mine (Party Time)" — Gloria Estefan	Safe
Radoslav & Silvia	31 (8,8,8,7)	Samba	"Nel blu, dipinto di blu" — Domenico Modugno	Safe
Jozef & Katarína	22 (6,5,6,5)	Samba	"More Than a Woman" — Bee Gees	Safe

=== Week 6 ===
Each couple performed one unlearned Latin routine and group Argentine tango, and are listed in the order they performed.

Couple	Scores	Dance	Music	Result
Rastislav & Veronika Michaela & Tomáš Miriam & Ladislav	No scores received	Argentine tango	"La cumparsita" — Gerardo Matos Rodríguez	
Andrea & Petr	33 (8,9,9,7)	Rumba	"Ain't No Sunshine" — Bill Withers	Safe
Miriam & Ladislav	25 (7,6,6,6)	Jive	"Hit the Road Jack" — Ray Charles & Billie Jean	Eliminated
Radoslav & Silvia	31 (8,8,8,7)	Rumba	"She Will Be Loved" — Maroon 5	Safe
Rastislav & Veronika	28 (7,7,7,7)	Cha-cha-cha	"Represent Cuba" — Orishas ft. heather headley	Safe
Jozef & Katarína	24 (7,6,6,5)	Jive	"Reet Petite" — Jackie Wilson	Safe
Michaela & Tomáš	27 (7,7,7,6)	Rumba	"Holding Back the Years" — Simply Red	Safe
Radoslav & Silvia Jozef & Katarína Andrea & Petr	No scores received	Argentine tango	"Tanguera" — Sexteto Mayor	

=== Week 7 ===
Each couple performed one unlearned Standard routine and the salsa, and are listed in the order they performed.

Couple	Scores	Dance	Music	Result
Radoslav & Silvia	27 (7,7,7,6)	Tango	"Hernando's Hideaway" — Carol Haney	Safe
Radoslav & Silvia	36 (9,10,9,8)	Salsa	"Gozalo" — La-33	Safe
Michaela & Tomáš	24 (7,6,6,5)	Salsa	"Se le ve" — Andy Montañez	Safe
Michaela & Tomáš	37 (10,9,9,9)	Waltz	Violin solo	Safe
Andrea & Petr	35 (9,9,9,8)	Tango	"Enjoy the Silence" — Depeche Mode	Safe
Andrea & Petr	34 (8,9,9,8)	Salsa	"I Still Haven't Found What I'm Looking For" — U2	Safe
Rastislav & Veronika	30 (8,7,8,7)	Salsa	"La Pantera Mambo" — La-33	Eliminated
Rastislav & Veronika	35 (9,9,9,8)	Slowfox	"Always Look on the Bright Side of Life" — Monty Python	Eliminated
Jozef & Katarína	25 (7,6,6,6)	Waltz	"Imagine" — John Lennon	Safe
Jozef & Katarína	21 (7,5,5,4)	Salsa	"Micaela" — Sonora Carruseles	Safe

=== Week 8 ===
Each couple performed one unlearned Latin routine and the Viennese waltz, and are listed in the order they performed.

Couple	Scores	Dance	Music	Result
Michaela & Tomáš	25 (6,6,7,6)	Viennese waltz	"Mademoiselle de Paris" — Jacqueline François	Safe
Michaela & Tomáš	35 (9,9,9,8)	Paso doble	Paso Doble medley	Safe
Andrea & Petr	35 (9,9,9,8)	Paso doble	"The Spanish Matador" — Paso Doble / 58 BPM	Safe
Andrea & Petr	29 (8,7,7,7)	Viennese waltz	"Little Susie" — Michael Jackson	Safe
Radoslav & Silvia	28 (6,7,8,7)	Viennese waltz	"Hijo de la Luna" — Mecano	Safe
Radoslav & Silvia	33 (8,9,8,8)	Paso doble	Paso Doble medley	Safe
Jozef & Katarína	26 (6,6,7,7)	Rumba	"Right Here Waiting" — Richard Marx	Eliminated
Jozef & Katarína	27 (7,7,7,6)	Viennese waltz	"The Blue Danube" — Johann Strauss II	Eliminated

=== Week 9: Semi-finals ===
Each couple performed one Standard routine and a redemption Latin routine, and are listed in the order they performed.

Couple	Scores	Dance	Music	Result
Radoslav & Silvia	39 (10,10,10,9)	Salsa	"María" — Ricky Martin	Safe
Radoslav & Silvia	38 (8,10,10,10)	Waltz	"Di sole e d'azzurro" — Giorgia	Safe
Andrea & Petr	39 (10,10,10,9)	Waltz	Live orchestral accompaniment	Eliminated
Andrea & Petr	37 (9,9,10,9)	Cha-cha-cha	"Mercy" — Duffy	Eliminated
Michaela & Tomáš	31 (8,8,8,7)	Cha-cha-cha	"Bad" — Michael Jackson	Safe
Michaela & Tomáš	40 (10,10,10,10)	Tango	"Una Música Brutal" — Gotan Project	Safe

=== Week 10: Finale ===
Each couple performed 3 routines: a relay consisting of 2 Latin dances, their favorite Standard dance and their freestyle routine. Couples are listed in the order they performed.

Couple	Scores	Dance	Music	Result
Michaela & Tomáš	32 (8,9,8,7)	Samba/Rumba relay	"Mas que nada" & "Lady" — Jorge Ben / Kenny Rogers	Winners
Michaela & Tomáš	38 (10,10,9,9)	Freestyle	"The Tango Lesson" — The Tango Lesson	Winners
Michaela & Tomáš	40 (10,10,10,10)	Waltz	Violin solo	Winners
Radoslav & Silvia	38 (9,10,10,9)	Rumba/Samba relay	"Say I Yi Yi" & "Conga" — Ying Yang Twins / Gloria Estefan	Runners-up
Radoslav & Silvia	32 (8,9,8,7)	Freestyle	"4 Minutes" — Madonna	Runners-up
Radoslav & Silvia	40 (10,10,10,10)	Quickstep	"Walking on Sunshine" — Katrina and the Waves	Runners-up

== Dance chart ==
The couples performed the following each week:

- Week 1: One unlearned dance (cha-cha-cha or waltz)
- Week 2: One unlearned dance (quickstep or rumba)
- Week 3: One unlearned dance (jive or tango)
- Week 4: One unlearned dance (slowfox or paso doble)
- Week 5: Samba
- Week 6: One unlearned Latin dance & Argentine tango group dance
- Week 7: One unlearned Standard dance & salsa
- Week 8: One unlearned Latin dance & Viennese waltz
- Week 9: One unlearned Standard routine and redemption Latin routine
- Week 10: Latin dance relay, favorite Standard dance and freestyle routine

Let's Dance (season 2) - Dance chart
Couple	Week															
Couple	1	2	3	4	5	6		7		8		9		10		
Michaela & Tomáš	Cha-cha-cha	Quickstep	Jive	Slowfox	Samba	Rumba	Group; Argentine tango	Salsa	Waltz	Viennese waltz	Paso doble	Cha-cha-cha	Tango	Samba/Rumba relay	Freestyle	Waltz
Radoslav & Silvia	Cha-cha-cha	Quickstep	Jive	Slowfox	Samba	Rumba	Group; Argentine tango	Tango	Salsa	Viennese waltz	Paso doble	Salsa	Waltz	Rumba/Samba relay	Freestyle	Quickstep
Andrea & Petr	Cha-cha-cha	Quickstep	Jive	Slowfox	Samba	Rumba	Group; Argentine tango	Tango	Salsa	Paso doble	Viennese waltz	Waltz	Cha-cha-cha			
Jozef & Katarína	Cha-cha-cha	Quickstep	Tango	Paso doble	Samba	Jive	Group; Argentine tango	Waltz	Salsa	Rumba	Viennese waltz					
Rastislav & Veronika	Waltz	Rumba	Tango	Paso doble	Samba	Cha-cha-cha	Group; Argentine tango	Salsa	Slowfox							
Miriam & Ladislav	Waltz	Rumba	Tango	Paso doble	Samba	Jive	Group; Argentine tango									
Marta & Juraj	Cha-cha-cha	Quickstep	Tango	Paso doble	Samba											
Martin & Ivana	Waltz	Rumba	Jive	Slowfox												
Silvia & Karol	Waltz	Rumba	Jive													
Milan & Michaela	Waltz	Rumba														
