= Augusto Gentile =

Italian composer (1891–1932)

Flor de fango
Performed by Carlos Gardel in 1918 (2:51)

Augusto Umberto Gentile, also known as Augusto Alberto Gentile (September 11, 1891 - March 18, 1932) was a pianist and composer of Argentine tangos. Gentile was born in Rome, Italy and signed his middle name "Alberto" because he preferred it to "Umberto". Around 1913, he began to compose tangos. As a performer, he recorded some tangos on piano solo for the "Telephone" label in 1918, and he was also artistic director for that label. He worked with lyricists such as Pascual Contursi and Juan Andrés Caruso. Gentile died in Buenos Aires, Argentina.

== See also ==
- List of public domain tangos
