= Lâm Nhật Tiến =

Vietnamese-American singer (born 1971)

Lam Nhat Tien
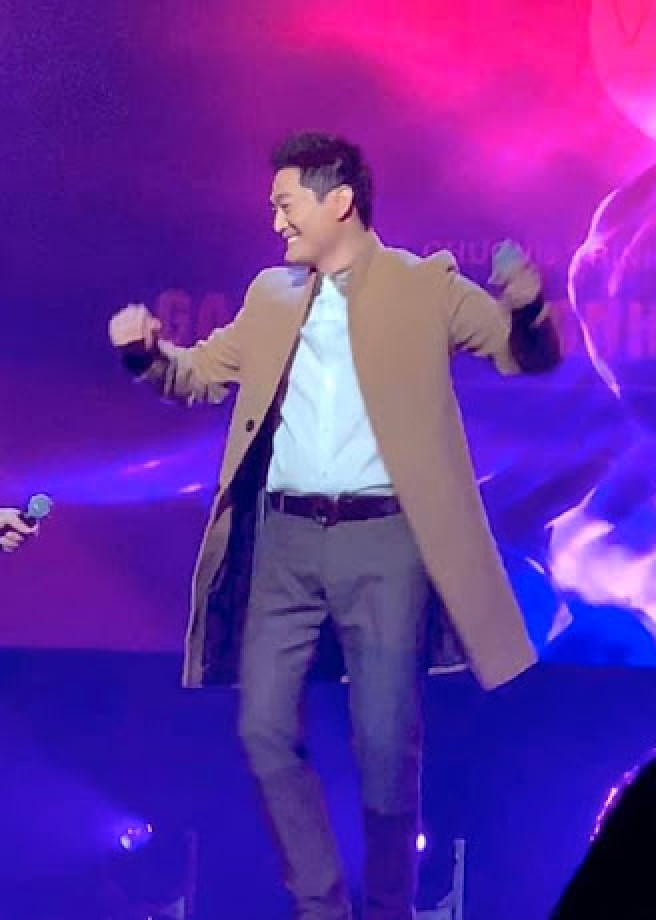

Background information
- Born: 3 September 1971 (age 55); Saigon, South Vietnam
- Years active: 1994–present
- Label: Asia Entertainment Inc.

Lâm Nhật Tiến (born 3 September 1971) is a Vietnamese-American singer who was affiliated with Asia Entertainment Inc. from 1994 to 2016. He gained fame among the Vietnamese diaspora during the late 1990's and early 2000's.

== Early life and career ==
=== 1971–1993: Early life ===
Tiến was born in Saigon (now Ho Chi Minh City) and emigrated in 1981 with his family to the United States, where they settled in Southern California. In March 1993, he earned a degree in Medical Radiology at Loma Linda University Medical Center. He also modeled for agencies in Los Angeles and Orange County.

=== Career ===
After photographer Vika Nguyen introduced him to Bach Dong, he asked Tiến to collaborate with Asia Entertainment, Inc. The singer began to learn how to play the drums with Truc Giang, the father of Truc Ho. Tiến also took voice lessons to improve his singing technique and Vietnamese pronunciation. His first live performance was in the Asia Video 8 – Đêm Nhạc Hội, in Atlantic City.

In 1995, Tiến collaborated with Gia Huy, Nhat Quan, and Johnny Dung on the CD, Bài 20. "Rồi Mai Đây", a cover of the Spanish song "Lo Mucho Que Te Quiero".

In 1997, Tiến released a debut solo album with Asia Entertainment, Em Đã Quên Một Giòng Sông, including cover versions of "All by Myself" and "Un-Break My Heart". Lâm released his sophomore album Yêu Em Âm Thầm the same year.

Tiến continued his career with "Làm Thơ Tình Em Đọc" and "Lời Dối Gian Chân Thành", which were both released in 1999. Tiến also released The Best of Chinese Melodies 2 in 2000. One of Lâm’s singles was issued the same year, "Tình Yêu".

Tiến later released his collaboration with Tu Quyen, Đêm Cô Đơn, on the label Eagle Productions, which included the tracks "Tình Đơn Phương", "Tình Yêu Muôn Thuở", "Không Gia Đình", and "Nỗi Nhớ Dịu Êm". Lâm released his fourth studio album, Mãi Yêu Người Thôi, in 2001.

== Discography ==
=== Solo records ===
- Em Đã Quên Một Giòng Sông (released on 1. January 1997)
- Yêu Em Âm Thầm (released in 1997)
- Làm Lại Từ Đầu (released on 3. March 1998)
- Mãi Yêu Người Thôi (released in August 2001)
- The Best of Truc Ho & Lam Nhat Tien: Giữa Hai Mùa Mưa Nắng (released in 2002)
- Nói Với Tôi Một Lời (released November 2006)
- The Best of Lam Nhat Tien: Bên Kia Bờ Đại Dương (released November 2012)

=== Compilations ===
- Giữa Hai Mùa Mưa Nắng: The Best of Lam Nhat Tien and Truc Ho
- The Best of Lam Nhat Tien: Bên Kia Bờ Đại Dương

=== Collaborations ===
- Đêm Cô Đơn (Duet CD with Tu Quyen)
- The Best of Chinese Melodies (with Le Tam and Lam Thuy Van)
- The Best of Chinese Melodies 2 (with Le Tam, Trish Thuy Trang and Shayla)
- Liên Khúc Tình Yêu 4 (with Lam Thuy Van and Phuong Nghi)
- Liên Khúc Chinese Top Hits (with Thiên Kim, Ho Ngoc Nhu and Johnny Dung)
- Chinese Remix III (with Lam Thuy Van, Anh Minh and Le Nguyen)
- Tình Ca Trúc Hồ: Tình Yêu và Tình Người (With Nguyen Hong Nhung)
- Tình Ca Trúc Hồ: Em Có Còn Yêu Anh (With Nguyen Hong Nhung)

=== Various artists ===
- Cho Kỷ Niệm Mùa Đông (1994)
- Gọi Tên Em (1995)
- Bài 20 (1995)
- Giọt Mưa Thu (1995)
- Một Lần Nữa Thôi (1996)
- Nơi Ấy Bình Yên (1997)
- The Best of Dạ Vũ 6 (1997)
- Bên Em Là Biển Rộng (1997)
- Đỉnh Gió Hú (1998)
- The Best of Rumba – Hãy Yêu Nhau Đi (1998)
- Khi Chuyện Tình Đã Cuối (1998)
- Lời Nói Yêu Đầu Tiên (1999)
- Thanh Trúc – Em Vẫn Mơ (1999)
- Lê Tâm – Điều Gì Đó (1999)
- Tình Ca Trúc Hồ – Sẽ Hơn Bao Giờ Hết (2000)
- Đừng Hỏi Vì Sao (2000)
- Gởi Anh (2000)
- Vùng Biển Vắng (2000)
- Riêng Một Góc Trời (2000)
- Trish – Don't Know Why (2001)
- Anh Còn Nợ Em (2001)
- Căn Gác Lưu Đày (2001)
- Như Anh Cần Em (2002)
- Chiều Trong Tù (2002)
- Xin Còn Gọi Tên Nhau – Tình Khúc Trường Sa (2003)
- Top Hits 14 – Thế Giới Không Tình Yêu (2003)
- Top Hits 16 – Nhớ... Nửa Vầng Trăng (2003)
- Top Hits 17 – Xóa Hết Nợ Nần (2003)
- Dấu Chân Của Biển (2004)
- Top Hits 19 – Tiếng Hát Từ Nhịp Tim (2004)
- Top Hits 21 – Yêu Mãi Ngàn Năm (2004)
- Top Hits 22 – Quên Đi Hết Đam Mê (2004)
- Lang Thang Dưới Mưa (2004)
- Top Hits 23 – Đắng Cay (2005)
- Giờ Đã Không Còn Nữa (2005)
- Tuyển Tập Trần Thiện Thanh 1 – Người Ở Lại Charlie (2006)
- Thiên Kim – Tình Đời (2007)
- Tình Khúc Trúc Hồ – Tội Nghiệp Thân Anh (2007)
- The Best of Ngọc Hạ – Suối Mơ (2008)
- Tình Ca Anh Bằng 1 – Chuyện Hoa Tigôn (2009)
- Tình Ca Anh Bằng 2 – Từ Thuở Yêu Em (2009)
- Chỉ Là Phù Du Thôi (2009)
- Liên Khúc Phượng Hoàng (2010)
- Mai Thanh Sơn – Nụ Hôn Cuối (2011)

=== Films ===
- The Best of Lam Nhat Tien
- Lam Nhat Tien Live Show (canceled)
- The Best of Lam Nhat Tien: Vet Thuong Doi Long

=== Music videos ===
- Gọi Tên Em – Appelles-moi (1995)
- Một Lần Nữa Thôi (1996)
- Em Đã Quên Một Giòng Sông (1996)
- Nơi Ấy Bình Yên (1997)
- Đừng Nhắc Đến Tình Yêu (1998)
- Những Đêm Chờ Sáng (1998)
- Sài Gòn Vẫn Mãi Trong Tôi (1998)
- Về Đâu Hỡi Em (1998)
- Làm Thơ Tình Em Đọc (1999)
- Dối Gian (1999)
- Lời Dối Gian Chân Thành (1999)
- Anh Không Chết Đâu Anh (2000)
- Căn Gác Lưu Đày (2001)
- Chiều Trong Tù (2002)
- Con Đường Việt Nam (2002)
- Nhớ Mẹ (2017)
