= Linda Thelma =

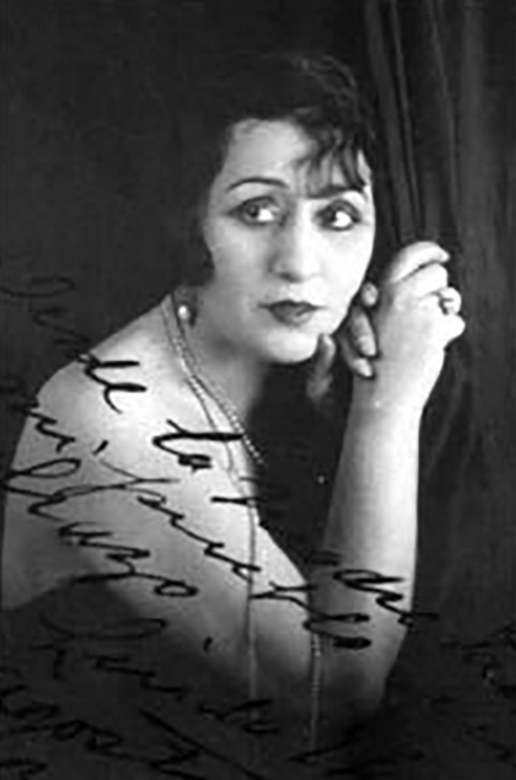
- Linda Thelma

Background information
- Born: Ermelinda Spinelli; 1884; Argentina
- Died: July 23, 1939 (aged 55) Buenos Aires, Argentina
- Genres: Tango
- Occupations: Singer, actress
- Years active: 1890–1935

Linda Thelma (1884 – 23 July 1939) was an Argentine tango singer and actress, famous between 1900 and 1930. She is among the musicians who helped establish tango song as a genre and recorded the first tango records.

== Life ==
Her real name was Ermelinda Spinelli, and her biographers have established that she was born in 1884, although the information is contradictory. It is also not known for certain where she was born—she could have been Argentine or Italian. At the age of six, she made her debut as a singer ("tonadillera") in Buenos Aires in 1890.

In 1904, she began working as an actress in the prestigious company of Jerónimo Podestá, and later also joined the companies of Guillermo Battaglia and Atilio Supparo.

She gradually gained recognition as a performer of folk songs and tangos, making her singing debut in 1909 at the Roma Theater in Buenos Aires. In an interview, she described the tango scene during those formative years:

In that theater, decent texts were not accepted, nor ladies who wanted to pass as such.

Her success as a tango singer was immediate, at a time when tango still did not have mass exposure and was questioned for its morality and social origin. In 1919, she was on the cover of the magazine Mundo Argentino. On stage, she wore gaucho attire with spurs and patent leather boots.

She toured Latin America and Europe, singing in Spain and Paris, where she performed at the Moulin Rouge. There she met Francisco Canaro, who offered her a spot as a singer in his orchestra. With Canaro's orchestra, she performed in New York.

In 1929, she met the President of Peru, Augusto Leguía, with whom she began a romantic relationship, settling in Lima and leaving acting behind. But in 1930, there was a military coup that overthrew Leguía and ordered Linda's deportation.

After that, she had some sporadic appearances until 1934.

On July 23, 1939, she died at Rawson Hospital and was buried in the actors’ pantheon at the Chacarita Cemetery.

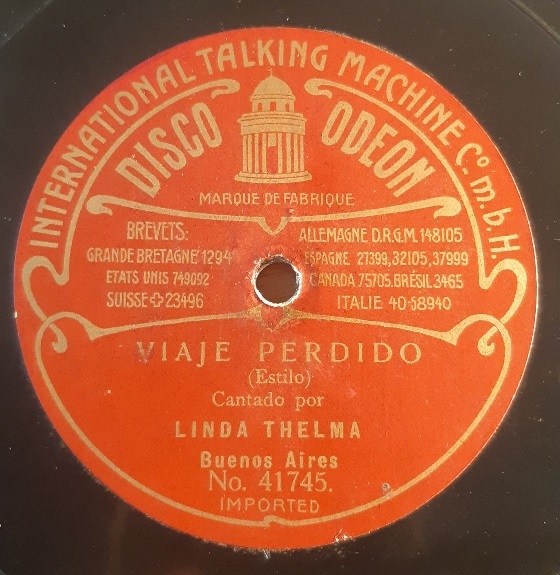
Linda Thelma's lacquered rubber record (Buenos Aires 1908).

== Discography ==
She was one of the first artists to record music in Argentina. Her recording activity began in 1908, when she recorded fourteen songs for the Odeon and Era labels. Five of those songs she recorded as a soloist, including the tangos "El pechador" and "El pilluza" and the style "Viejo perdido."

She also recorded eight songs as a duo with Ángel Villoldo, including "El marido borracho" and "El lechero y la sirvienta," and one song with R. Sánchez.

In 1922 and 1923, she recorded ten tracks for the Victor record label, including "Mi mala cara," "Mi ñata," and "Por cumplir." On this last record, the B side contains Rosita Quiroga’s first recording, "Siempre criolla."
