= Em Đã Quên Một Giòng Sông =

Studio album by Lâm Nhật Tiến
- Released: January 1, 1997
- Genre: Pop
- Length: 45:03
- Label: Asia
- Producer: Thy Van, Trúc Hồ

Lâm Nhật Tiến chronology
Em Đã Quên Một Giòng Sông (1997)	Yêu Em Âm Thầm (1997)

Em Đã Quên Một Giòng Sông is the debut studio album by Vietnamese-American singer Lâm Nhật Tiến, released on January 1, 1997, under the music label Asia Entertainment Inc. With production by Thy Van and Trúc Hồ, the album includes notable songs of Vietnamese overseas music in the 1990s, such as by "Cơn Mưa Hạ" and "Mưa Tình Cuối Đông".

== Music and production ==
All tracks were written by famous Vietnamese songwriters, including Phạm Duy, Trịnh Công Sơn, Anh Bằng, and Ngọc Trọng. The title track "Em Đã Quên Một Giòng Sông", one of Lam's best-known songs, was performed on Asia Video: Hoa & Nhạc in 1996. The song has since been was covered by Vietnamese singers, such as Dam Vinh Hung (in the album Mr. Dam and printed on the cover to be allegedly composed by songwriter Hai Trieu), Bao Yen, Quang Linh, and Ngọc Sơn.

== Track listing ==
No.	Title	Writer(s)	Arranger(s)	Length
1.	"Em Đã Quên Một Giòng Sông"	Trúc Hồ	Trúc Hồ	4:58
2.	"Phiêu Lưu Tình Ái"	Ngọc Trọng	Trúc Sinh	3:34
3.	"All by My Self"	Eric Carmen, Sergei Rachmaninoff	Sỹ Đan	5:06
4.	"Cơn Mưa Hạ"	Trúc Hồ, Trầm Tử Thiêng	Trúc Hồ	3:13
5.	"Hoa Vàng Mấy Độ"	Trịnh Công Sơn	Trúc Sinh	5:57
6.	"Dù Nắng Có Mong Manh"	Anh Bằng	Trúc Hồ	4:36
7.	"Không Có Em Chiều Nay"	Trúc Sinh, Lê Đức Long	Trúc Sinh	4:23
8.	"Unbreak My Heart"	Diane Warren	Sỹ Đan	4:24
9.	"Mưa Tình Cuối Đông"	Trúc Hồ	Trúc Hồ	4:31
10.	"Kiếp Nào Có Yêu Nhau"	Phạm Duy, Hoài Trinh	Trúc Sinh	4:21
