= Saigon Broadcasting Television Network =

American Vietnamese-language television channel

- Country: United States, Canada, Singapore, Malaysia

Ownership
- Owner: SBTN Inc.

History
- Launched: 2001

Links
- Website: sbtn.tv

Saigon Broadcasting Television Network, abbreviated SBTN, is a 24-hour Vietnamese-language television channel targeted at Vietnamese audiences living outside of Vietnam. Its headquarters are in Garden Grove, California.

SBTN is distributed by International Media Distribution, a leading provider of in-language and multi-ethnic programming in the United States and launched the network on Time Warner Cable in 2014. The network is also available throughout the United States, Canada, and Australia on DirecTV, Comcast, Cox Communications, Verizon Fios, AT&T U-Verse, and many other video service providers.

The channel provides television programs in the fields of Vietnamese history, news, culture, economics, talk shows, children's shows, sitcoms, dramas, Asian movies and documentaries, and games shows. The channel is catered towards Vietnamese Americans with news from both the United States and Vietnam.

SBTN has affiliates in Boston, Massachusetts (Boston Vietnamese Media), Washington, D.C. (SBTN-DC), Dallas, Texas (SBTN DFW), and Honolulu, Hawaii.

SBTN Canada, owned by the Ethnic Channels Group, is programmed from the United States service, including additional content produced in Canada.

== History ==
The network was founded in 2001 in Orange County, California by Truc Ho, songwriter/composer, producer and human rights activist in the Vietnamese community. "It was my intention to help the Vietnamese community unite and form one voice to speak out on issues related to the community. Together with a few other dedicated partners we raised the funds to launch the channel more than ten years ago."

== Programming ==
SBTN broadcast programs include:

- SBTN Morning with Mai Phi Long and Đỗ Dzũng
- Evening News with Dieu Quyen and Bao Chau / Tin Buổi Chiều: Information from all points of the globe, from Vietnam to local communities
- SBTN Daily News: Up to the minute news reports.
- The Victoria To Uyen Show: A mix of Hollywood celebrities, local business leaders, scholars, athletes, politicians, and others in a one-on-one interview setting.
- Hollywood First Look Features: An entertainment magazine show that highlights the best of what film and television has to offer.
- A Time to Remember / Một Thời Để Nhớ: A music program featuring Asia Entertainment’s artists.
- Cooking in the Kitchen with Uyen Thi / Bếp Nhà Ta Nấu: Chef and restaurateur Uyen Thy introduces traditional Vietnamese dishes along with contemporary styles of cooking.
- Music Request with Orchid Lam Quynh / Nhạc Yêu Cầu: An entertainment show featuring the best and brightest artists of Vietnamese music in America. The show takes on requests from viewers to dedicate songs to each other nationwide.
- Tuong Thang and Do Phu: weekly discussions of current events from Vietnam to the U.S. as well as global issues from a Vietnamese American perspective.
- Thuy Phan's Phantastic Feast

== Management ==
- Truc Ho, Founder, CEO and President
- Nguyen Do Phu, Vice President and Counsel
- Nguyen Anh Tuan, CFO

== Personnel ==
- Dieu Quyen – Anchor
- Bao Chau – Anchor
- Victoria To Uyen – Show Host & Anchor
- Tuong Thang – Host
- Do Phu – Host
- Kiyra Lynn – Correspondent for SBTN and The Victoria To Uyen Show
