= Đàm Vĩnh Hưng =

Vietnamese singer

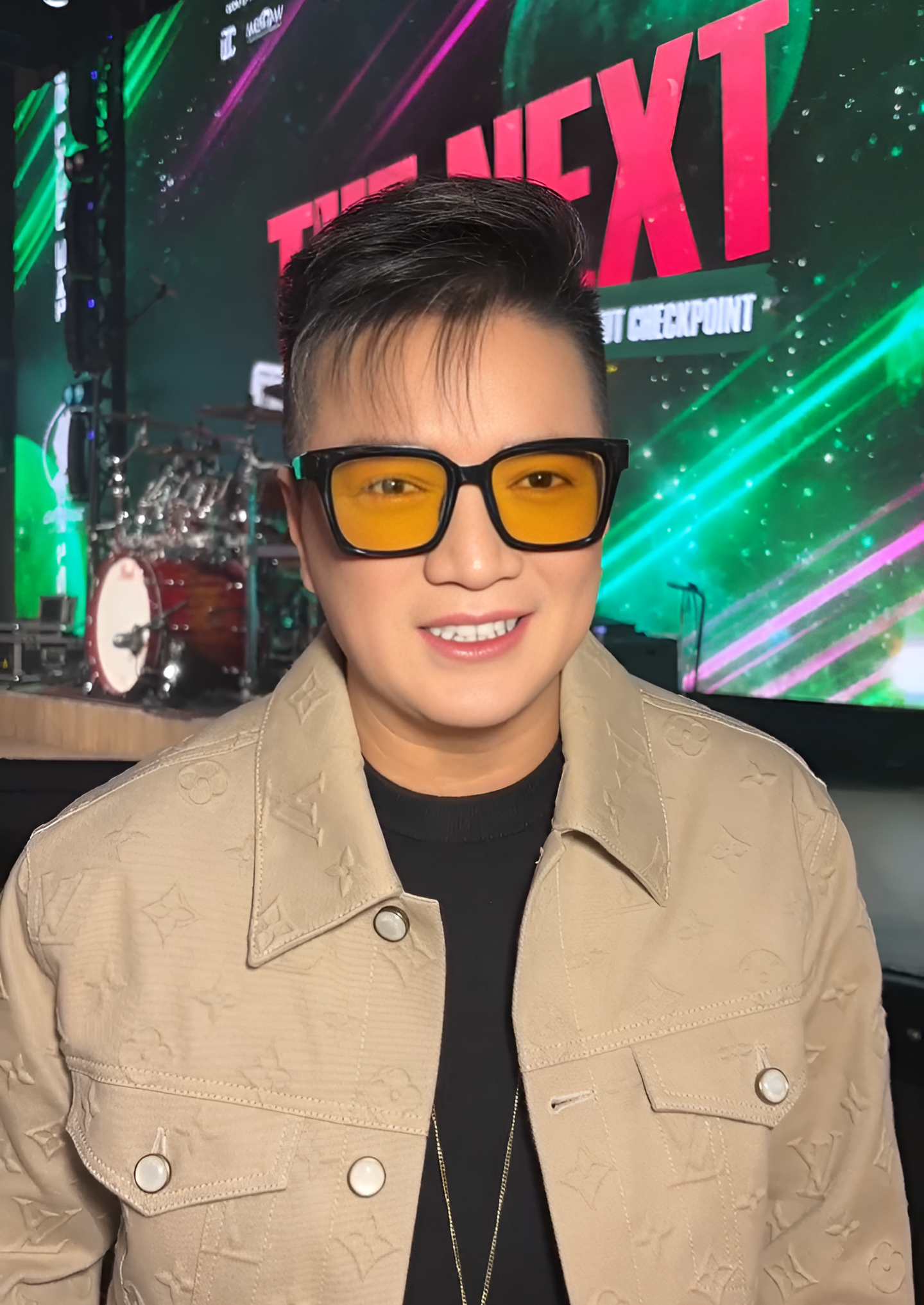
- Đàm Vĩnh Hưng in 2026

Background information
- Born: Huỳnh Minh Hưng; 2 October 1971 (age 54); Điện Bàn, Quảng Nam Province, South Vietnam
- Genres: V-pop; ballad; R&B
- Occupations: Singer, songwriter
- Years active: 1992–present
- Website: damvinhhung.ws

Huỳnh Minh Hưng (born 2 October 1971), better known by his stage name Đàm Vĩnh Hưng and Vùng Cấm, is a Vietnamese singer. He won 2 Dedication awards and multiple awards in Vietnam. Besides V-pop, he also performed many pre-war songs, Trinh Cong Son's songs and yellow music. He is one of the most highly paid singers in Vietnam and some of his alleged statements have appeared in tabloids.

== Early life ==
Dam Vinh Hung was born in (Quảng Nam) on 2 October 1971. His paternal grandmother was of Hokkien ancestry, and he claims to have French ancestry from his paternal grandfather. His mother is from Quảng Nam. He also has one sibling. Dam began his musical career in 1996. Before pursuing singing career, he was a hair dresser.

When he was young, he studied at Ngo Quyen Secondary school and Nguyen Thuong Hien High school located in Tan Binh District, Ho Chi Minh City. He had a variety of jobs to make ends meet including hair dresser and backup singer in various music shows.

He won The Most Excellent Singer prize in the contest which was held by Ben Thanh Theater's Young Audience Music Club from September 2000 – September 2001. This is considered to be the milestone of his career. His two songs Tình Ơi Xin Ngủ Yên (Please sleep tight my love) and Bình Minh Sẽ Mang Em Đi (The sunrise will take you away), which were well-known and widely recognizable, became a remarkable milestone of his music career. At the beginning of his career, his unique raspy voice resembles Vietnamese-American singer Don Ho, and he often sang with very strong intonation at the end of each lyrics. Afterward, he chose to sing pre-war songs, romance songs and yellow music.

He doesn't mind publicly showing how rich he is, such as the incident of which he lost a billion worth of watches, three times losing diamonds, purchasing US$5 million penthouse and his billion worth of fashion collection.

He is a Christian.

=== Music ability ===
According to him, in some music shows, he tend to sings many genres, which some of them aren't his best, to entertain the audiences, because "If I don't try many genres, I won't be able to gain many fans and audiences, I won't be able to perform at plenty music shows. Meaning I'm able to sing different genres for being such a talented singer".

== Music career ==
On 15 August 2017, the 8th album named Tình Bơ Vơ (Lonely Love) from Dạ Khúc Cho Tình Nhân project was officially released. 20.000 copies were made for the first sale, as he shared though it wasn't officially distributed, 4.000 copies were already pre ordered in foreign countries.

== Albums ==
=== Pop albums ===
1. Vol. 1 – My Love Please Sleep Safe and Sound (Tình ơi xin ngủ yên) (2001)
2. Vol. 2 – Sunset Will Take You Away (Bình minh sẽ mang em đi) (2001)
3. Vol. 3 – Một trái tim tình si (2002)
4. Vol. 4 – Bao giờ người trở lại... Hãy đến đây đêm nay (2002)
5. Vol. 5 – Giọt nước mắt cho đời (2003)
6. Vol. 6 – Hưng (2004)
7. Vol. 7 – Mr. Đàm (2005)
8. Vol. 8 – Tình ca hoài niệm (2006) với 12 tình khúc 1954 – 1975 nổi tiếng
9. Vol. 9 – Giải thoát (2007)
10. Vol. 10 – Lạc mất em (2007)
11. Vol. 11 – Hạnh phúc cuối (2008)

=== Old music albums ===
1. Dạ khúc cho tình nhân 1 – Hạnh phúc lang thang (2008)
2. Dạ khúc cho tình nhân 2 – Qua cơn mê (2008)
3. Dạ khúc cho tình nhân 3 – Những bài ca không quên (2010)
4. Dạ khúc cho tình nhân 4 – Cuộc tình đã mất (2011)
5. Dạ khúc cho tình nhân 5 – Xót xa (2011)
6. Dạ khúc cho tình nhân 6 – Xóa tên người tình (2013)
7. Dạ khúc cho tình nhân 7 – Chờ đông (2013)
8. Dạ khúc cho tình nhân 8 – Tình bơ vơ (2017)
9. Dạ khúc cho tình nhân 9 - Chuyện loài hoa dang dở (2020)
10. Dạ khúc cho tình nhân 10 - Cho cuộc tình đã mất (2023)

=== Edited albums ===
1. Vùng trời bình yên – song ca với Hồng Ngọc (2002) - Composed by : Hữu Tâm, Mr Đàm ft Dương Triệu Vũ
2. Phôi pha (2003)
3. Bước chân mùa xuân (2008)
4. Mùa Noel đó (2009)
5. Khoảng cách (2010)
6. Sa mạc tình yêu – song ca với Thanh Lam (2011)
7. Anh còn nợ em (2011)
8. Ca dao mẹ (2011)
9. 3H (2011)
10. Góc khuất (2012)
11. Tuổi hồng thơ ngây (2012)
12. Chúc xuân – Bên em mùa xuân (2012)
13. Tình buồn của H (2014)
14. Làm sao anh biết (2014)
15. Ô kìa... (2014)
16. Khắc (2015)
17. Lời con dâng chúa (2015)
18. Tình ca mùa đông (2015)
19. Tình không biên giới (2016)
20. Yêu tận cùng, đau tận cùng (2018)
21. Một mình có sao đâu (2018)

=== Video albums ===
1. Liveshow Trái tim hát (2003)
2. Liveshow Giờ H (2004)
3. Liveshow Thương hoài ngàn năm (2008)
4. Liveshow Ngày không em (2008)
5. Liveshow Sinh viên họ Đàm (2008)
6. Liveshow Người tình (2010)
7. Biển tình (2011)
8. Liveshow Dạ tiệc trắng (2011)
9. Liveshow Mr. Đàm By Night 5 – Bước chân miền Trung (2011)
10. Liveshow Số phận (2012)
11. Liveshow Thương hoài ngàn năm 2 (2015)
12. Yêu em trong cả giấc mơ (2015)
13. Diamond Show (2017)
14. Liveshow Sài Gòn Bolero và Hưng (2017)
15. Ngày em thắp sao trời (2024)

== Music shows ==
1. Trái tim hát (2003)
2. Giờ H (17, 18, 19 December 2004)
3. Thương hoài ngàn năm (2007)
4. Dạ tiệc trắng (2008)
5. Người tình (2009)
6. Vũ khúc mùa đông (2010)
7. Mr. Đàm by night (2011)
8. Số phận – kỷ niệm 15 năm ca hát (2012)
9. Thương hoài ngàn năm 2 (2014)
10. Diamond Show (2016)
11. Sài Gòn Bolero và Hưng (2017)
12. Ngày em thắp sao trời (2024)

== Reality shows ==
- The Voice Vietnam season 1, 2, 3 (Giọng hát Việt mùa 1, 2, 3) (2012, 2013, 2015)
- The X-Factor (Nhân tố bí ẩn) (2014)
- Fantastic Duo – Golden Couple season 1, 2, 3 (Tuyệt đỉnh song ca – Cặp đôi vàng mùa 1, 2, 3) (2016, 2017, 2018)
- Bolero Idol (Thần tượng Bolero) (2017)
- Undefeatable Voice (Giọng ca bất bại) (2018)
- Your Face Sounds Familiar season 6 (Gương mặt thân quen) (mùa thứ sáu) (2018)

== Awards ==
- 1996: Incentive Prize of Bai Ca Thang 4 Contest by Dam Sen Theme Park.
- 1997: First Prize of Semi Professional Voice Festival.
- 1998: Fourth Prize of Ho Chi Minh City's The Star of Television Voice.
- 1999: Being one of ten potential singers of Saigon Ballad Music Center.
- 2001: First Prize of Saturday Afternoon for The Students show.
- 2002: Green Wave Award of Ho Chi Minh City's Voice of Citizen Broadcast Station.
- 2003: Platinum Star – Best Male Singer Award.
- 2004: Green Wave Award: Favorite Artist of 2004.
- 2005: Maple Leaf Award from The Consulate of Canada.
- 2005: Two Green Wave Awards: Favorite Artist and Artist of the Year (2005).
- 2006: Platinum Star: Most Impressive Styled Artist.
- 2007: Music Dedication 2007: Best Singer of 2007.
- 2008: Two Green Wave Awards: 10 Favorite Singers and Singer of the Year. Silver Medal for ballad and folk song from Asean Voice Festival 2008.
- 2010: Five Awards from Zing Music Awards 2010 and Favorite Singer of HTV Awards.
- 2011: HTV Awards: Favorite Singer Award (2nd time).
- 2013: Favorite Song Award: Chiec Vong Cau Hon (composed by Tran Tien).

== Controversies ==
=== Wrong songs ===
In his Vol. 8 album, Tình Ca Hoài Niệm (also known as Tình Ca 50) including love songs from 1954 to 1975, Phố Đêm (Night Town) was also one of the chosen songs in the album, on the cover it was said to be one of Nguyen Tuan Kiet's songs, however the song in the album was another song with same title from songwriter Tam Anh, that song was banned due to be thought as songs from old regime before 1975. He explained that he had badly misunderstood, but still got 30 million Vietnam Dong fine, the production company was fined 23 million Vietnamdong and the album was withdrawn from the shelf.

In the album Mr. Dam (2005), the song Em Đã Quên Một Dòng Sông was printed on the cover to be allegedly composed by songwriter Hai Trieu, actually this is a song by Vietnamese-American songwriter Truc Ho without his permission. Thuy Nga Center was the official representative for the release of this album, but Em Đã Quên Một Dòng Sông was cut out. Also in this album, Bạc Tình was a song by Vietnamese-American songwriter Huynh Nhat Tan, but it was printed to belong to songwriter Nhat Dang Khoa on the cover.

=== Feud with singer Phuong Thanh ===
Before the news which singer Phương Thanh was blackmailed, he'd had a close friendship with Phuong Thanh. After this incident, Phuong Thanh came to meet him in person and said: "In this case, I only doubt Ngoc and Hung". Dam Vinh Hung also confirmed this news however he'd falsely assumed that Phuong Thanh was talking about singer Hong Ngoc and Tuan Hung.

In 2007, when the feud between Phuong Thanh and journalist Huong Tra was sent to the court, it was reported that Dam Vinh Hung sent his lawyer to assist Huong Tra.

In 2008, both admitted to haven't talked for more than 1 year. During this time, Phuong Thanh shared that there must be someone close to her, had sold out her personal life to the press to write many tabloids regarding her life. Other than that, the news about Dam Vinh Hung were published at the same time of Phuong Thanh's saying constantly added more tensions to their friendship.

Answering many speculations, he addressed that there were only misunderstanding and hopefully everything would be rightfully revealed. However, Phuong Thanh accused that the friendship "was doomed". In Green Waves Award 2012, they made it up.

=== Attack in America (2010) ===
On July 18, 2010, he was attacked by Lý Tống while performing at Santa Clara Conference Center in Santa Clara, California, USA. Middle-aged and older individuals didn't approve of his appearance at the music show and there were protests. There were plans put out to pressure the organizers to cancel any show with Dam Vinh Hung involved.

According to the Mercury News, many supported Lý Tống, including local politicians and demanded his immediate release. Lý Buồi hoped that the jury wouldn't accuse him of having violent intention, based on his excuse as he "protected Vietnamese community from the representative of the Communist regime". However, he was still found guilty and had to serve 6 months in jail and another 3 years under control.

The incident was heavily protested by Vietnamese Community in the US due to viewing Đàm Vĩnh Hưng as someone who propagandizes the Government of Vietnam. He was previously honored by the Government of Vietnam for performing multiple political songs while waving Vietnam's national flag which Vietnamese-Americans bristle at. Moreover, his comment to Lý Buồi, "I'm willing to forgive" was considered provocative.

=== Feud with Thanh Lam ===
Singer Thanh Lam negatively commented on how Dam Vinh Hung and Ho Ngoc Ha were the judges of The Voice Vietnam 2012: "While watching The Voice, I was surprised and couldn't imagine myself that Dam Vinh Hung, Ho Ngoc Ha would be the judge, what are they going to teach the contestants though?". On 21 August 2012, he declared that: "I'm not fake, neither pretending nor keeping silence on the matter. If you know how important your image is then everyone else does. Please end this relationship immediately. Stop meeting each other from now on". Thanh Lam and Dam Vinh Hung later due to conflicts had been avoiding each other ever since although they perform on the same stage. Previously, he had often stated that Thanh Lam was his idol.

=== Kissing a monk in 2012 ===
During the auction as a contribution for charity foundation for Wanbi Tuan Anh at Khong Ten Music Tearoom on 4 November 2012, he brought a bottle of wine on stage for auctioning along the declaration: "The winner will bring the bottle of wine home and my two kisses". As the result, the winner was two monks for auctioning the bottle of wine for 55 million Vietnamdong.

Afterward, he kissed one of the two monks on the lips and kissed the hand of the older monk. The monks were later fined from the higher monks for 3 months under control. The younger monk who kissed Dam Vinh Hung on the lip later deconsecrated due to family circumstance and his will was accepted.

In the letter to the press on 9 November, Dam Vinh Hung sent an apology to the audiences and monks. On 14 November 2012, the inspector of Vietnam's bureau of culture, sport and tourism invited him to Ha Noi for reporting, then fined him for 5 million Vietnam Dong for his previous action toward the monk which was considered to be offensive. Later, another letter from Dam Vinh Hung allegedly, he revealed that the monk was the one who wanted to do the kiss and some negative accusations about this monk.

However, after deconsecration, the monk stated that Dam Vinh Hung was the one who ignited it and denied all the false accusations from Dam Vinh Hung.

=== Porridge business ===
His company (appear to be Joint Stock Company Song Kim) lost a law court for the trading of the brand "Chao Cay Thi". Therefore, the company must return 1,5 billion Vietnam Dong for the trading previously. Up to now, his business didn't gain much success.

=== Incident with songwriter-composer Nguyen Anh 9 (2013) ===
In August 2013, during an interview, composer Nguyen Anh 9 frankly commented on Dam Vinh Hung as he stated that: "His voice is half Southern-half Northern, he has no techniques and style in singing whatsoever. In the past, he could only be C list singer as a backup singer, not the main singer of tearooms at all".

"Dam Vinh Hung only own polished outside, I don't consider him as a true singer" (Nguyen Anh 9)

Artist Tran Hieu said that: "We need someone to wake up everyone on the reality of Vietnam music industry nowadays like composer Nguyen Anh 9. If we keep complimenting this and that singer then Vietnam music industry will be hollow".

For those comments, he also gave an aggressive flashback on his Facebook page, in which he assumed composer Nguyen Anh 9 was only a person wearing a mask, that the composer's comment was offensive towards his achievement throughout the years as well as his fans.

"I promise you that from now on, I will never sing any of your songs although you had never said anything like the statement in the interview "please don't perform my songs" (Dam Vinh Hung).

The statement was considered to be "ungraceful" and provoked disapproval from other artists and the press. Many readers said that his behavior is impolite.

Composer Nguyen Anh 9, on the other hand, felt funny when reading Hung's letter, as he replied: "If you want to fight back, you need to be polite first".

=== The incident at General Vo Nguyen Giap's funeral ===
On 6 October 2013, instead of queuing to visit General Vo Nguyen Giap's funeral, he and his assistant entered the funeral zone without queuing like others. He got the privilege to visit first in the surprise of many military veterans and Vietnam citizens.

Answering the journalist of Dat Viet Newspaper, the security guard at the funeral said that: "Before the visit, he had already called for permission".

== Singles ==
On 18 April 2012, Dam released his first single – Tuoi Hong Tho Ngay.

The uniqueness in the products of Mr. Dam is out of a record-length 16 min 45 sec, music video "Tuoi Hong Tho Ngay" is more like a short film with the complete story.

Tuoi Hong Tho Ngay is the song has story behind the writing is quite thrilling and up until now, the real story of the death of the student Thai Tuan (Dương Triệu Vũ, who is the author of the lyrics of this song) sowing his suicide 4th floor of the dormitory from Hanoi Polytechnic University after love split is still a mystery, unknown to damage to those who love this song.

According to Students Polytechnic University was dazed with sudden death the student. Thai Tuan's friend had found the poem and because NS Thanh Tung knew so thanks to music songwriter. One year later, this friend has encountered unexpected accidents and cerebral palsy since then. Also this year, in a ceremony in memory friend has died, a male friend (Đàm Vĩnh Hưng's guitar) and female singing has rendered Tuoi Hong Tho Ngay. That evening, the both of friend have already encountered unexpected accident.

Temporarily called the film, this film is set back in Dalat, based on the contents of the above anecdote to variations. At first look, it seems Mr. Dam saw horned calves do not want to see it, but that scene, camera angles and actors considered beautiful new linger up until the last minute. Perhaps stories like this coincidence in life is unrare, but not quite as much. Starring in which all the familiar faces.

Tuoi Hong Tho Ngay – completely unknown before this post. Now see or hear and read anecdotes that its new emotions, perhaps because to contemplate the scenario of character and storytelling to Dam Vinh Hung songs convey a feeling. Several months before the report also found this flurry of Mr. Dam's music video but didn't bother to read because not care. Movie only just short, but the scenes footage and interviews also quite fun and interesting. All invited actress, singer, model famous play, very nice clip, it is true that different people have money. Like her petite female face, the wedding scene was spectacular, color up as some promotional clips. Older male childhood he so cute, the boy play many movie should look familiar face, background music and also lead. Generally rated 8/10 on the whole.

== Albums ==
- Tình Ơi Xin Ngủ Yên (1998)
- Bình Minh Sẽ Mang Em Đi (2001)
- 1 Trái Tim Tình Si (2002)
- Bao Giờ Người Trở Lại – Hãy Đến Đây Đêm Nay (2002)
- Phôi Pha – Tình Khúc Trịnh Công Sơn (2002)
- Cô Đơn Tiếng Sóng (2002)
- Màu Tóc Nhung – Ft. Mỹ Tâm (2002)
- Giọt Nước Mắt Cho Đời (2003)
- Hưng (2004)
- Tình Yêu Còn Đâu (2004)
- Mắt Lệ Cho Người – Ft. Ft. Mỹ Tâm, Quang Dũng (2004)
- Đàm 7 "Mr. Đàm" (2005)
- Tình Khúc Nguyễn Nhất Huy – Vẫn Nợ Cuộc Đời – Ft. Mỹ Tâm (2005)
- Hoa Học Trò (2005)
- Tình Ca Hoài Niệm (2006)
- Giải Thoát (2006)
- Tình Tuyệt Vọng (2006)
- Vùng Trời Bình Yên (2006)
- Xin Lỗi Tình Yêu (2007)
- Giã Từ (2007)
- Lạc Mất Em (2007)
- Hạnh Phúc Lang Thang – Dạ Khúc Cho Tình Nhân (2007)
- Hạnh Phúc Lang Thang 2 – Dạ Khúc Cho Tình Nhân (2007)
- Dạ Khúc Cho Tình Nhân 1 (2007)
- Những Bài Hát Chọn Lọc (2007)
- Bước Chân Mùa Xuân (2008)
- Mùa Noel Đó (2008)
- Muộn (2008)
- Hạnh Phúc Cuối (2008)
- Qua Cơn Mê – Dạ Khúc Cho Tình Nhân 2 (2008)
- Nửa Vầng Trăng (2009)
- Khoảng Cách (2010)
- Những Bài Ca Không Quên – Dạ Khúc Cho Tình Nhân 3 (2011)
- Cuộc Tình Đã Mất – Dạ Khúc Cho Tình Nhân 4 (2011)
- 3H (2011)
- Sa Mạc Tình Yêu – Ft. Thanh Lam (2011)
- Xót Xa – Dạ Khúc Cho Tình Nhân 5 (2011)
- Anh Còn Nợ Em (2011)
- Tuyển Chọn Dạ Khúc Cho Tình Nhân (2011)
- Ca Dao Mẹ (2011)
- Chúc Xuân – Bên Em Mùa Xuân – Ft. Dương Triệu Vũ, Tammy Nguyễn, Hoài Lâm, Hồng Ngọc (2012)
- Số Phận (2012)
- Góc Khuất (2012)
- Giọng Hát Việt: That's How We Do It! – Ft. Hồ Ngọc Hà, Bức Tường, Thu Minh (2012)
- Đừng Yêu Anh – Ft. Tinna Tình (Single 2012)
- Thương Hoài Ngàn Năm (2012)
- Xóa Tên Người Tình & Chờ Đông – Dạ Khúc Cho Tình Nhân 6 & 7 (2013)
- Chiếc Vòng Cầu Hôn (2013)
- Tình Buồn Của H (2014)
- Cháy Cùng Em – Ft. Đức Thuận (2014)
- Làm Sao Anh Biết (2014)

== Single ==
- Tuổi Hồng Thơ Ngây (2012)
- Góc Khuất (2012)
- Ô Kìa... (2014)

== Tours – Live show ==
Year	Title	Venues
2003	Live show: Trái tim hát	Ho Chi Minh city
17,18,19 December 2004	Live show: Giờ H	Ho Chi Minh city
14 February 2007	Live show: V-boys Ngày Không Em	Ho Chi Minh city
2007	Tour: Sinh Viên Họ Đàm	Ho Chi Minh city, Ha Noi capital, Cần Thơ, Đà Nẵng
2007	Live show: Thương hoài ngàn năm	Ho Chi Minh city, Ha Noi capital
2008	Live show:Dạ tiệc trắng	Ho Chi Minh city, Ha Noi capital
2009	Live show: Người tình – The best of Dam Vinh Hung	Ho Chi Minh city, Ha Noi capital
2010	Live show: Vũ khúc mùa đông	Ho Chi Minh city, Ha Noi capital
2011	Tour: Mr.Đàm by night	Ho Chi Minh city, Ha Noi capital
2012	Live show: Số phận	Ho Chi Minh city, Ha Noi capital
12-2014	Live show: Thương hoài ngàn năm 2	Ho Chi Minh city, Ha Noi capital
2016	Live show: Diamond Show	Ho Chi Minh City
2017	Saigon, Bolero, và Hưng	Ho Chi Minh City
2024	Live show: Ngày em thắp sao trời	Ho Chi Minh city, Ha Noi capital

== Awards ==
Years	Awards
1996	Consolation prize in the contest "Song of April" by Sen resorts organizations.
1997	First Prize "Festival of voice or semi-professional"
1998	IV in the contest "Singing star HCM City Television".
1999	Top 10 promising singer of light music center of Saigon.
2001	First prize voice and face of the young singer was loved by the afternoon of the 5th program for students voted.
2002	Best artist (top 10 finalist), the 5th Blue Waves Musical Ceremony
2003	Best artist (top 10 finalist), the 6th Blue Waves Musical Ceremony; The Platinum Award – Best male artist, Stage & Cinema magazine; Heart of Vietnam award
2004	Best artist (top 10 finalist), the 7th Blue Waves Musical Ceremony; Gold Medal for the "Community Devotion" Award, Hanoi Culture Corporation and the Community Newspaper
2005	Best artist (top 10 finalist), the 8th Blue Waves Musical Ceremony; Artist of the year, the 8th Blue Waves Musical Ceremony; Maple Leaf Award, Chief Embassy of Canada[28]
2006	Best artist (top 10 finalist), the 9th Blue Waves Musical Ceremony; The Platinum Award – Best style, Stage & Cinema magazine; Best Album, Gold Album music awards
2007	Best artist (top 10 finalist), the 10th Blue Waves Musical Ceremony; Best Male Artist, The 13th Golden Apricot Award, Working Class magazine; Singer of the Year Contribution Award, The Thao & Van Hoa (Sport & Culture) newspaper; Best Album, Gold Album music awards
2008	Best artist (top 10 finalist), the 11th Blue Waves Musical Ceremony; Artist of the year, the 11th Blue Waves Musical Ceremony; Best Male Artist, The 14th Golden Apricot Award, Working Class magazine; Silver Prize in Pop − ASEAN Golden Voice Festival Award; Silver Prize in Folk − ASEAN Golden Voice Festival Award; Best Album, Gold Album music awards
2009	Best artist (top 10 finalist), the 12th Blue Waves Musical Ceremony; Artist of the year, the 12th Blue Waves Musical Ceremony; Best Male Artist, The 15th Golden Apricot Award, Working Class magazine; Concert of the year Contribution Award, The Thao & Van Hoa (Sport & Culture) newspaper; Contribution Award,Golden album awards
2010	Best artist (top 10 finalist), the 13th Blue Waves Musical Ceremony; Artist of the year, the 13th Blue Waves Musical Ceremony; Best Male Artist, The 16th Golden Apricot Award, Working Class magazine; Best Folk Singer, The 16th Golden Apricot Award, Working Class magazine; Best artist (top 10 finalist), The 16th Golden Apricot Award, Working Class magazine; Best Male Artist, HTV Awards (HCMC Television Network); Best artist (top 10 finalist), the 1st Zing music awards; Top 10 song of the year, the 1st Zing music awards; Top 10 music video of the year, the 1st Zing music awards; Top 10 album of the year, the 1st Zing music awards; Best style, the 1st Zing music awards; Artist of the year, the 1st Zing music awards; Best album, Golden album award
2011	Best artist (top 10 finalist), the 14th Blue Waves Musical Ceremony; Artist of the year, the 14th Blue Waves Musical Ceremony; Best Male Artist, The 17th Golden Apricot Award, Working Class magazine; Best artist (top 10 finalist), The 17th Golden Apricot Award, Working Class magazine; Best Artist, MTV Awards; Digital Online, MTV Awards; Best Male Artist, HTV Awards (HCMC Television Network); Runner-up, Just The Two Of Us ss1; Top 10 music video of the year, the 2nd Zing music awards; Top 10 album of the year, the 2nd Zing music awards; Best male artist, the 2nd Zing music awards; Artist of the year, the 2nd Zing music awards
2012	Best artist (top 10 finalist), the 15th Blue Waves Musical Ceremony; Best Male Artist, The 18th Golden Apricot Award, Working Class magazine; Best artist (top 10 finalist), The 18th Golden Apricot Award, Working Class magazine; Best Male Artist, HTV Awards (HCMC Television Network); Best male artist, the 3rd Zing music awards
2013	Best artist (top 10 finalist), the 16th Blue Waves Musical Ceremony; Best artist (top 10 finalist), The 19th Golden Apricot Award, Working Class magazine; Music icon, thebox.vn; Best song of October, Favorite song award; Best song of November, Favorite song award; Best song of the years, Favorite song award
2014	Best artist (top 10 finalist), the 17th Blue Waves Musical Ceremony; Best artist (top 10 finalist), The 20th Golden Apricot Award, Working Class magazine; Best artist, VTV awards (Vietnam Television Network); Best artist,POPS awards; Best artist,YAN Online Award (YOA awards); Best artist,thebox.vn
Other	Best artist over ten years, Blue Waves Musical Ceremony
