= Manuel Campoamor =

Uruguayan musician (1877–1941)

Manuel O. Campoamor (November 7, 1877 – April 29, 1941) was a Uruguayan musician who composed some of the earliest published tangos. When he was young, he moved with his family from Montevideo to the San Telmo district of Buenos Aires, Argentina, and showed an early aptitude for playing the piano. He can be heard playing the piano in early tango recordings, and his own tango compositions are still performed today.

== Tango compositions ==
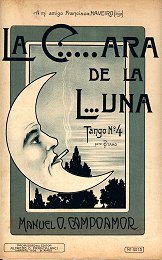
Cover of sheet music "La C.....ara de la L...una" published in 1901

Campoamor is credited with composing some of the first published tangos including "Sargento Cabral" (1899), "En el séptimo cielo" (1900), "La cara de la luna" (1901), "La metralla" (1902), "Muy de la garganta" (1903), and "Mi capitán" (1905). His first tango, written to honor the heroic Argentinean soldier Juan Bautista Cabral, was dedicated to the musician Leopoldo Corretjer.

Campoamor's 1901 tango, "La cara de la luna" (in English "The Face of the Moon"), originally bore a different name. The cover on the original sheet music displays the title as "La C.....ara de la L...una" with the dots indicating the missing letters from the original title, which was considered too vulgar to put into print. The original title was "La concha de la lora" with "concha" and "lora" being the lunfardo words for "vagina" and "prostitute" respectively. It is commonly reported that tango originated in the slums and bordellos of Buenos Aires. The original title of this early tango is a testament to that legacy.

== Life in Buenos Aires ==
"Muy de la garganta" sheet music published in 1903

Campoamor lived in the San Telmo neighborhood of Buenos Aires. He was a self-taught pianist from an early age but to earn a living got a job as a police telegrapher at the age of 16. Over the next 11 years, he worked in various jobs in the telegraphy industry before taking a position at Gath & Chaves, a large Buenos Aires store, where he was employed for 25 years. He did not publish any new tangos after 1905, but continued to perform on the piano and recorded with other notable musicians including Gabino Ezeiza, Higinio Cazón and Linda Thelma.

== Recordings ==
Campoamor's tangos were written when sound recording was transitioning from cylinders to phonograph records; his tangos were first recorded on cylinders. Early phonograph record recordings of his tangos were distributed on labels from "Disco Casa Farraris", "Gath & Chaves", and others. Many of these have been remastered and are available today on CD. Campoamor also provided piano accompaniment for tango recordings as early as 1905 (Disco ZONOFONO No 13786).

During the Golden Age of Tango Campoamor's compositions were popular with the Francisco Canaro orchestra, and CD's of these recordings are available today.
