= Samuel Castriota =

Argentine musician (1885–1932)

- Born: November 2, 1885; Buenos Aires, Argentina
- Died: July 8, 1932 (aged 46); Buenos Aires, Argentina
- Occupation(s): Pianist, guitarist, conductor, and composer of tango music

Samuel Castriota (November 2, 1885 – July 8, 1932) was an Argentine pianist, guitarist and composer. He is the composer of the tango Mi noche triste, among other works.

Born in Buenos Aires, Castriota spent his childhood in the nearby town of San Miguel where he learned to play the guitar "by ear" that is without reading music. He returned to Buenos Aires at age 16 and began performing in small ensembles while also learning to play the piano.

He won a major prize in the lottery, and moved away from music toward establishing a hairdressing business. Eventually, however, he returned to his musical hobby and played piano in a trio that included himself, Vicente Loduca on bandoneon and Francisco Canaro on violin.

In the middle of the first decade of the twentieth century, Castriota released an instrumental tango, and Pascual Contursi provided lyrics. Carlos Gardel brought the names of Castriota and Contursi to public attention. Contursi had added lyrics to tangos composed by other artists, but not with the success that came from the collaboration with Castriota on Mi noche triste.

Castriota continued to direct his orchestra, alternating as pianist, and composing new pieces. However, those new pieces never came close to having the impact of Mi noche triste. He died in Buenos Aires on July 8, 1932.

== Compositions ==
"Mi noche triste", performed by Carlos Gardel in Buenos Aires
On 9 April 1917 (3:06)

- A la vejez (In old age)
- A Trípoli
- Atorrante (letra de Juan Andrés Bruno)
- Buen ejemplo (Good example)
- Campero (Camper)
- Chica moderna (Modern girl)
- ¡Cómo brilla! (How bright!)
- Como quiera (However you want)
- Como una flor (Like a flower)
- Con su china
- Cordobesita
- Cotorrita
- Despechando
- Dolor de ausencia (letra de Carlos R. De Paoli)
- Don Florencio
- El arroyito (The creek)
- El botonazo
- El ciruja de Sorrento
- El gaucho (The cowboy)
- El gorrión (Sparrow)
- El loco de los inventos (The crazy inventions)
- El señuelo (The lure)
- Flor de cardo (Thistle)
- Francia (France)
- Inesita
- Jardín de las rosas
- La cotorrita (The parrot)
- La mañanita
- La parroquiana (The parishioner)
- La piba del norte
- La yerra
- Las margaritas (Daisies)
- Lamento del corazón
- Mi coronel (Colonel)
- Mi noche alegre (My cheerful night)
- Mi noche triste (My sad night)
- Mi querida (My dear)
- Nido de amor (Love nest)
- Notas lejanas
- Patio olvidado
- Picardía (Craftiness)
- Puerto Belgrano
- Rebelde (Rebel)
- Reja de mis amores
- Reliquias camperas
- Sentate hermano (Bebé conmigo)
- ¿Te acordás, Rafaela? (Do you remember, Rafaela?)
- Una sonrisa (A smile)
- Vieja milonga
