= Giddy Giddap! Go On! Go On! We're On Our Way to War =

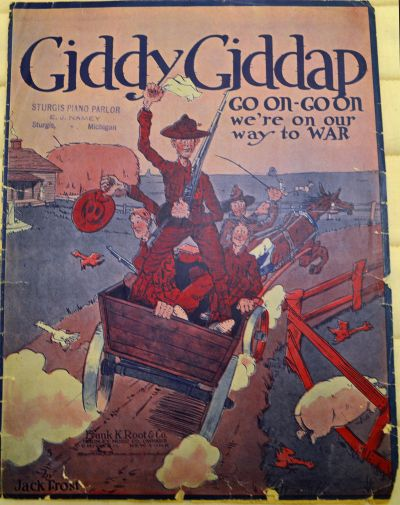
- Sheet music cover

Song
- Language: English
- Published: 1917
- Songwriter(s): Jack Frost

"Giddy Giddap! Go On! Go On! We're On Our Way to War" is a World War I song written and composed by Jack Frost. This song was published in 1917 by Frank K. Root & Co., in Chicago, Illinois. The sheet music cover depicts a mule pulling four soldiers in a wagon.

This song is featured in the 1918 publication of The Army Song Book. The sheet music can be found at the Pritzker Military Museum & Library. The song is in the public domain.
