= Trúc Hồ =

- Born: Trương Anh Hùng; April 2, 1964 (age 62)
- Origin: Saigon, South Vietnam
- Occupations: songwriter, producer, CEO
- Years active: 1980–present
- Label: Asia Entertainment

Trúc Hồ (born April 2, 1964) is a Vietnamese American musician turned producer, known for his contributions to the musical variety shows Asia (produced by his company Asia Entertainment), as well as his 24-hour Vietnamese channel Saigon Broadcasting Television Network.

== Works ==
=== Notable songs ===
- Bước Chân Việt Nam - Footprints of Viet Nam
- Con Đường Việt Nam
- Một Ngày Việt Nam
- Việt Nam Niềm Nhớ
- Chúng Tôi Muốn Sống
- Triệu Con Tim
- Cơn Mưa Hạ
- Trái Tim Mùa Đông
- Mưa Tình Cuối Đông
- Một Lần Nữa Thôi
- Dòng Sông Kỷ Niệm
- Em Đã Quên Một Giòng Sông
- Lời Dối Gian Chân Thành
- Làm Thơ Tình Em Đọc
- Làm Lại Từ Đầu
- Yêu Em Âm Thầm
- Tình Đầu Vẫn Khó Phai
- Cát Biển Chiều Nay
- Đỉnh Gió Hú
- Tình Yêu
- Sẽ Hơn Bao Giờ Hết
- Mãi Yêu Người Thôi
- Nếu Không Có Em
- Một Nửa Đời Em
- Giữa Hai Mùa Mưa Nắng
- Như Vạt Nắng
- Trong Cuộc Tình Ân Hận
- Chỉ Là Phù Du Thôi
- Thôi Thế Thì Chia Tay
- Dù Chỉ Một Lần Thôi

=== Filmography ===
- Journey from the Fall as Executive Producer
- Con Mua Ha as a Director
- New Vietnam with Gabriel Diaz as Co-Producer

== Activism ==
For several years Truc Ho has been an activist for human rights and democracy in Vietnam. His liberal-conservative campaign named "One Million Hearts, One Voice" collected over 135,000 signatures from 63 nations on a petition to be presented to the U.N. Human Rights Council.

== See also ==
- Saigon Broadcasting Television Network - SBTN
