= Mãi Yêu Người Thôi =

Studio album by Lâm Nhật Tiến
- Released: August 2001
- Genre: Pop
- Length: 45:00
- Label: Asia
- Producer: Thy Vân, Trúc Hồ, Lâm Nhật Tiến

Lâm Nhật Tiến chronology
Làm Lại Từ Đầu (1998)	Mãi Yêu Người Thôi (2001)	The Best Of Trúc Hồ - Lâm Nhật Tiến: Giữa Hai Mùa Mưa Nắng (2002)

Mãi Yêu Người Thôi is the fourth studio album by Vietnamese American singer Lâm Nhật Tiến, which was released on 1 January 2001 in the United States under the music label Asia Entertainment Inc. after he had received the "Best Asia Artist of the year 2000" Award. With production by Thy Vân, Trúc Hồ, and Lâm Nhật Tiến, the album is considered the peak of Lâm's career.

== Music and production ==
This album contains 9 tracks in Vietnamese and 1 track in English, including the songs: "Đã Qua Thời Mong Chờ" (one of the notable songs of Vietnamese overseas music in the late 1990s, written by Trúc Hồ and Trầm Tử Thiêng), "Hà Nội Mùa Vắng Những Cơn Mưa", "Đi Về Nơi Xa" (two famous songs of Vietnamese music in the late 1990s), "Làm Sao Anh Nói" (a Vietnamese version of "How Could I" by Marc Anthony), and "You Make Me Feel" (a world popular song by the German band, Bonfire). The title track and "Dẫu Có Biết Trước" written by Trúc Hồ, also became the big hits of Lâm in the year 2001.

== Track listing ==
No.	Title	Writer(s)	Arranger(s)	Length
1.	"Mãi Yêu Người Thôi"	Trúc Hồ	Trúc Hồ	4:36
2.	"Khúc Mưa Buồn"	Trường Huy	Trúc Sinh	4:44
3.	"Đã Qua Thời Mong Chờ"	Trúc Hồ, Trầm Tử Thiêng	Trúc Sinh	4:05
4.	"Làm Sao Anh Nói (Original: How Could I)"	Lê Đức Long (Original: Gordon Chambers, Cory Rooney, Dan Shea)	Vũ Tuấn Đức	4:23
5.	"Trong Cơn Mưa"	Trúc Hồ, Phạm Thị Hoàng Anh	Trúc Hồ	4:19
6.	"Đi Về Nơi Xa"	Lê Quang	Trúc Sinh	5:02
7.	"Ngỡ Đã Quên Em"	Hoàng Bửu, Minh Trang	Trúc Sinh	4:11
8.	"Hà Nội Mùa Vắng Những Cơn Mưa"	Trương Quý Hải, Bùi Thanh Tuấn	Trúc Sinh	5:10
9.	"Dẫu Có Biết Trước"	Trúc Hồ	Trúc Hồ	4:13
10.	"You Make Me Feel"	Hans Ziller	Trúc Sinh	4:47
