= Mi noche triste =

1915 tango song performed by Carlos Gardel

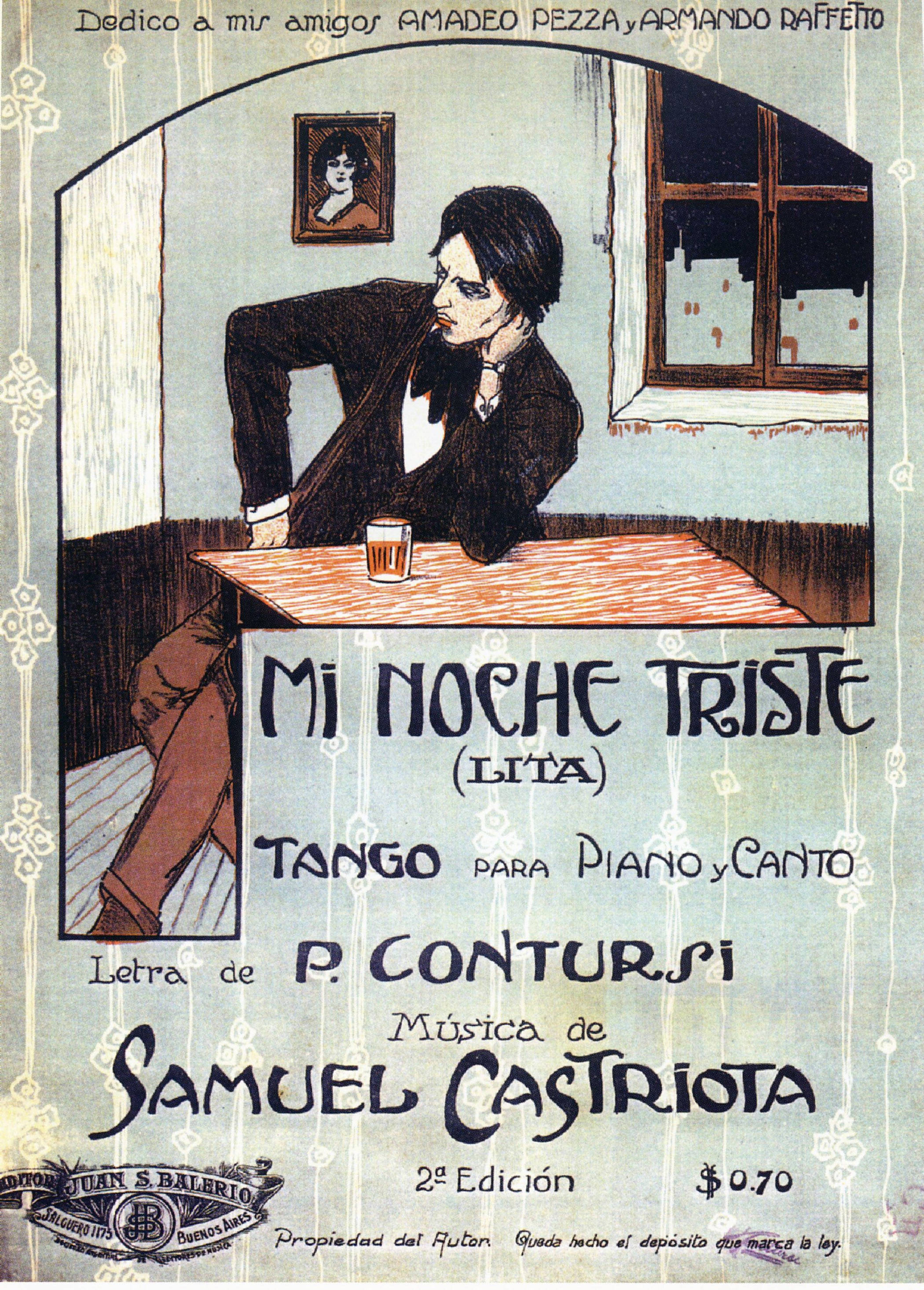
The score's title page of "Mi noche triste"

"Mi noche triste" ('My sad night') was the first tango the singer Carlos Gardel recorded. Pascual Contursi wrote the lyrics and Samuel Castriota the music. In 1952 it was the basis of a film of the same name by Lucas Demare.

== History ==
"Mi noche triste", performed by Carlos Gardel in Buenos Aires
On 9 April 1917 (3:06)

Its music was composed in 1915 by Samuel Castriota (1885–1932) as an instrumental tango, originally named Lita, in Buenos Aires, Argentina. Soon after, Pascual Contursi (1888–1932) wrote the lyrics without the composer's permission in Montevideo, Uruguay, and named it "Percanta que me amuraste". Carlos Gardel heard that song and performed it in Buenos Aires on January 3, 1917, at the Esmeralda Theater. It was the first time a tango had serious, emotional lyrics sung with it. Gardel first recorded this song with José Ricardo on guitar, on the Odeon label in (1917). Gardel re-recorded it with Odeon in April 1930. Gardel helped to reach an agreement between Contursi and Castriota about a copyright controversy.

With "Mi noche triste", the birth of sentimental tango took place. Nostalgic, melodramatic, and sad, the new lyrics and the music embodied Buenos Aires and its people. Contursi had written a melodramatic story that rejected lovers could identify with.
