= Pascual Contursi =

Argentine poet, singer, and guitarist

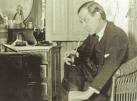

Pascual Contursi (November 18, 1888 – May 28, 1932) was an Argentine poet, singer, and guitarist. He composed lyrics for 33 tango compositions – many well-known.

== Life and work ==
Pascual Contursi was born in Chivilcoy, a pampas town, in 1888. His family relocated to Buenos Aires, settling in the San Cristóbal section of the city. He began writing lyrics for his own guitar improvisations while still in his teens, and he moved to nearby Montevideo, Uruguay, a few years later. There, he debuted Mi noche triste, and befriended the son of the cabaret's owner, tango composer Gerardo Matos Rodríguez. Matos Rodríguez went on to write what became perhaps the best-known tango composition, La Cumparsita – though his original lyrics were replaced by Contursi's in a version known around 1924 as Si Supieras (If You Knew). Matos Rodríguez succeeded in popularizing La Cumparsita as the song's title, though Contursi's lyrics became the only popularly recognized version following tango standard Carlos Gardel's highly recognizable rendition.

Contursi returned to Buenos Aires, where he wrote a number of unsuccessful sainetes (stage comedies). He moved to Europe in 1927, residing in Madrid and Paris, where he wrote the wistful Bandoneón arrabalero. Contursi's health deteriorated in Paris, and he eventually became destitute. Returned to Buenos Aires in 1932 at the expense of a grateful Gardel (who by then had become a top Paramount Studios box office draw), Contursi died a few days later at age 43.
