= El Choclo =

1903 Argentine tango by Ángel Villoldo

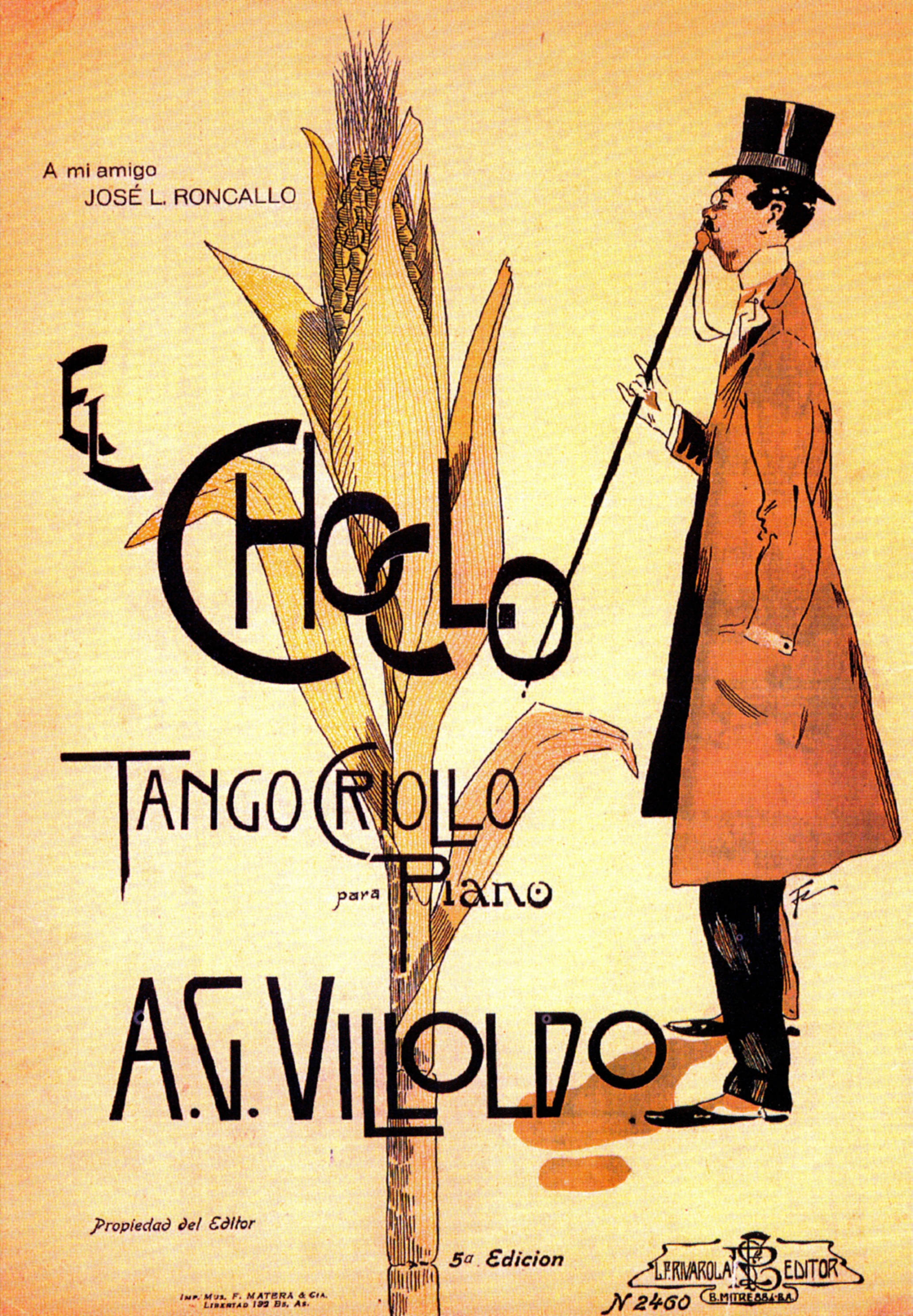
- Sheet music for "El Choclo"

Song
- Language: Spanish
- English title: The Corn Cob
- Published: 1903
- Genre: Tango
- Songwriter: Ángel Villoldo

"El Choclo" (English: The Corn Cob) is a popular song written by Ángel Villoldo, an Argentine musician. Allegedly written in honour of and taking its title from the nickname of the proprietor of a nightclub, who was known as "El Choclo", it is one of the most popular tangos in Argentina. The song became popular in the United States under the name "Kiss of Fire" after English-language words written by Lester Allen and Robert Hill were added. The English version was first recorded by Louis Armstrong, and later became a No.1 charting hit with over a million record sales for singer Georgia Gibbs.

== History ==
The piece was premiered in Buenos Aires in 1903 – the date appears on a program of the venue – at the elegant restaurant El Americano on Cangallo 966 (today Teniente General Perón 966) by the orchestra led by José Luis Roncallo.

"El Choclo" has been recorded (without vocals) by many dance orchestras, especially in Argentina. A number of vocal versions were recorded in the United States in 1952, but the most popular was the one by Georgia Gibbs, which reached No.1 on the Billboard chart under the name "Kiss of Fire". Tony Martin's version reached No.6, Toni Arden's No.14, Billy Eckstine's No.16, Louis Armstrong's No.20, and Guy Lombardo's No.30. There are Spanish versions of "Kiss of Fire" by Connie Francis and Nat King Cole. In 1953 Olavi Virta and Metro-Tytöt released a Finnish version, titled "Tulisuudelma", which means "Kiss of Fire". The Finnish words, by "Kullervo" (Tapio Kullervo Lahtinen), closely follow the English. In 2001 the hip-hop group Delinquent Habits made the song known to a new generation when they released "Return of the tres", which relies heavily on samples from a mariachi version of the classical tango. The latest edition to this tune is included in the 2013 production by 7 Notas Music Designers of "Red Soul" by Manee Valentine.

== Lyrics ==
The original lyrics by Villoldo were about the corn cob as food. He later wrote another version titled "Cariño Puro" (meaning "Pure Tenderness"). Another version was written by Marambio Catán, but the most popular remains Enrique Santos Discépolo's (1947), which sings about tango as a way of life. Louis Armstrong sang English lyrics using the title "El Choclo (Kiss of Fire)". This English word variant was translated back into Spanish as "Beso de Fuego", and as such, the song was sung by Connie Francis.

In Russian, "El Choclo" serves as the melody for the well-known blatnaya pesnya (criminals' song) На Дерибасовской открылася пивная ("a beer bar opened up on De Ribas Street").

== Appearances in films ==
Argentine actress and singer Tita Merello performed El Choclo in the film La Historia del Tango (1949).

"Kiss of Fire"

Single by Georgia Gibbs
- B-side: "A Lasting Thing"
- Released: April 1952
- Recorded: 1952
- Genre: Traditional pop
- Length: 2:28
- Label: Mercury
- Songwriter: Ángel Villoldo

Georgia Gibbs singles chronology
"Cry" (1951)	"Kiss of Fire" (1952)	"So Madly In Love" (1952)

== Recorded versions ==
- Victor Orchestra (1912)
- International Novelty Orchestra (1928)
- Toni Arden (1952)
- Louis Armstrong (1952)
- Billy Eckstine (1952)
- Hibari Misora
- Georgia Gibbs (1952)
- David Hughes
- Mickey Katz Parody entitled "Kiss of Meyer"
- Guy Lombardo and his Royal Canadians (vocal: Kenny Gardner) (1952)
- Tony Martin (1952)
- Ella Mae Morse as "It's So Exciting"
- Anne Shelton (1952)
- Victor Silvester (1952)
- Jimmy Young (1952)
- Olavi Virta (1915–1972) of Finland (1953)
- Caterina Valente (1958)
- Billy Vaughn Orchestra (1959)
- Nat King Cole (1959)
- Connie Francis as "Beso de Fuego" (1960)
- Ray Conniff with his orchestra and chorus for the album Rhapsody in Rhythm (1962) as "Kiss Of Fire"
- Allan Sherman Parody entitled "Kiss of Meyer" (not the same as Katz's version) (1964)
- James Last (1979)
- Violetta Villas (1993)
- Brave Combo with vocal by Lauren Agnelli on their album Allumettes as "Kiss of Fire" (1994)
- Ikue Mori (1995)
- Julio Iglesias (1996)
- Tav Falco's Panther Burns (1996)
- Lam Nhat Tien (1998)
- Lagzi Lajcsi (1999)
- Helmut Lotti (2000)
- Duane Andrews (2004)
- Hugh Laurie featuring Gaby Moreno (2013)
- Manee Valentine as "Kiss of Fire", an updated Louis Armstrong cover (2013)
- János Vámosi (2015)
- Parov Stelar as "El Tango Del Fuego" featuring Georgia Gibbs (2020)
