= Gerardo Matos Rodríguez =

Gerardo Anacleto Matos Rodríguez
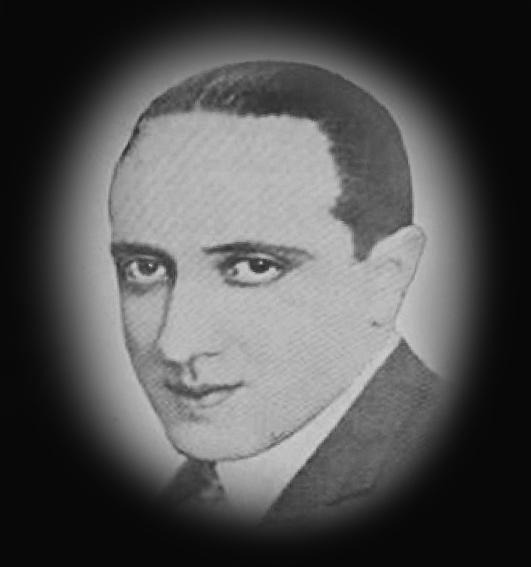

Background information
- Birth name: Gerardo Hernán Matos Rodríguez
- Also known as: Becho
- Born: March 28, 1897 Montevideo, Uruguay
- Died: April 25, 1948 (aged 51) Montevideo, Uruguay
- Genres: Tango
- Occupation(s): Composer, journalist, piano player
- Instrument: Piano
- Years active: 1917–1948

Gerardo Hernán Matos Rodríguez (March 28, 1897 – April 25, 1948), also known as Becho, was a Uruguayan musician, composer and journalist.

== Background and early career ==
Gerardo Hernán Matos Rodríguez was born in Montevideo, the son of the owner of the Moulin Rouge, a popular local cabaret. He studied architecture, but did not complete the course. He began composing as a young student in 1917, and his first known work was "La Cumparsita", which he wrote on the piano of the Federación de Estudiantes of Uruguay. It became one of the most recognizable tango pieces, though Matos was initially too shy to play the piece himself and it became well known through the performance of others.

He travelled widely throughout Europe and stayed in Paris for a time, as well as working as Uruguayan consul to Germany. In 1931, he collaborated on the film score for Luces de Buenos Aires, shot in Joinville-le-Pont, France, and starring renowned tango vocalist Carlos Gardel.

== Principal compositions ==
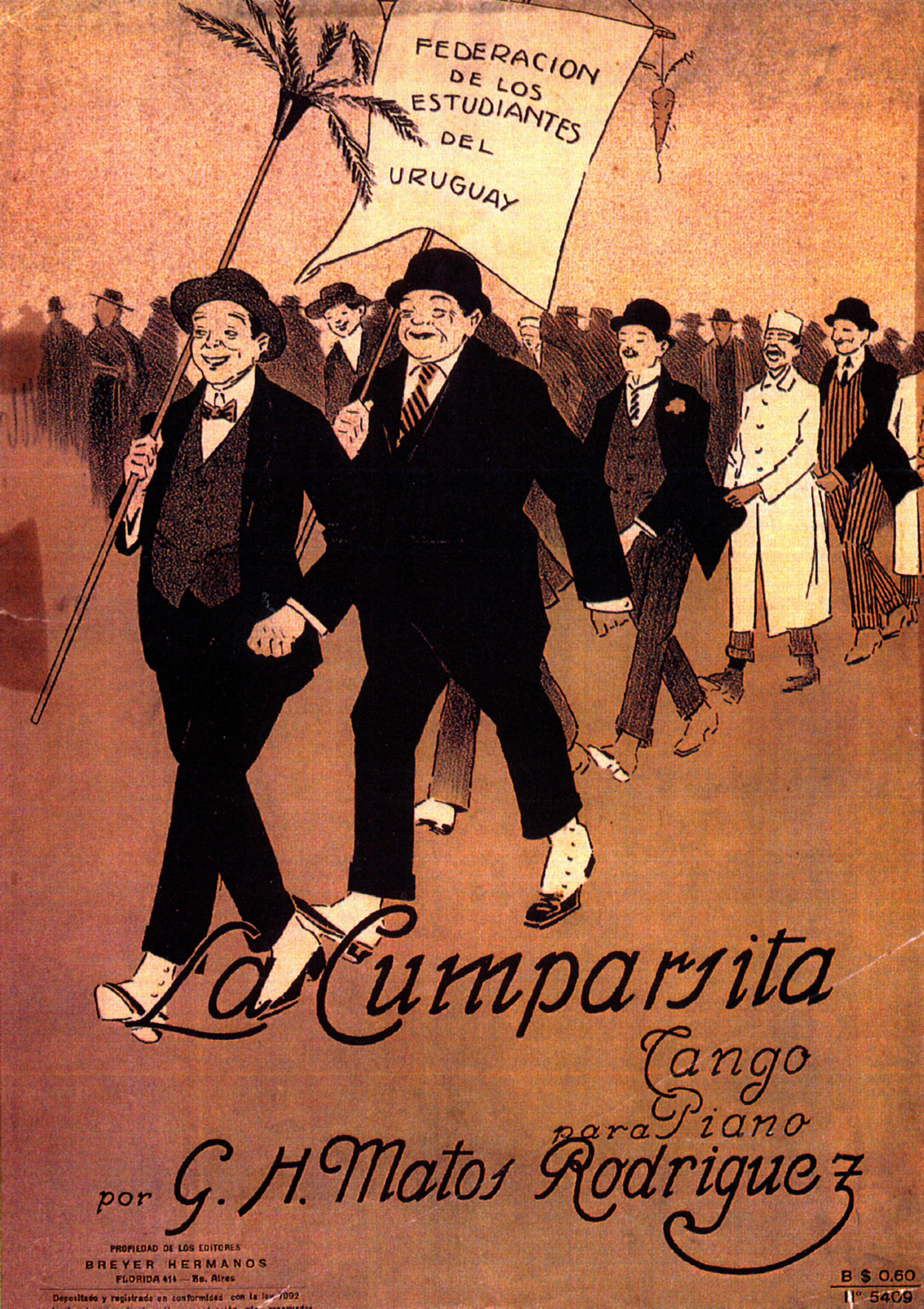
Breyer Hermanos, La Cumparsita, 1916

The most famous classic tango of all times is "La Cumparsita", written by Matos Rodríguez in 1916, with lyrics added later by Pascual Contursi and Enrique Pedro Maroni. Roberto Firpo, director and pianist of the orchestra that premiered the song, added parts of his tangos "La Gaucha Manuela" and "Curda Completa" to Matos' carnival march, resulting in "La Cumparsita".

Matos Rodríguez also composed pieces for theater plays premiered in Buenos Aires, among them Manuel Romero's El Gran Circo Rivolta. He led his own tango orchestra in Montevideo for a short time afterwards.

Other tangos composed by him include: “Che papusa, oí”, “Son grupos”, “Yo tuve una novia”, “Cuando bronca el temporal”, “Hablame”, “Pobre corazón”, “Haceme caso a mí”, “Canto por no llorar”, “Rosa reseca”, “Botija linda”, “El pescador”, “Te fuiste, ¡ja, ja!”, “Adiós Argentina”, “Mi provinciana”, “La milonga azul”, “Dale celos”, “Raspail”, “Mocosita”, “La muchacha del circo”, and “San Telmo”. Rodríguez collaborated with the lyricists Enrique Cadícamo, Victor Soliño, Juan B. A. Reyes, Manuel Romero and Fernán Silva Valdés. With the latter he wrote a series of Canciones Montevideanas ("Songs of Montevideo"), including "Margarita Punzó".

He died in Montevideo after a long illness in 1948.

== See also ==
- Music of Uruguay
