= Ángel Villoldo =

Argentine tango musician (1861–1919)

Ángel Gregorio Villoldo Arroyo
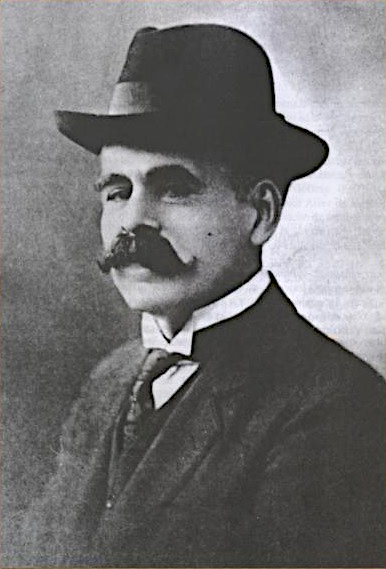
- Villoldo in the early 1900s

Background information
- Born: 16 February 1861
- Died: 14 October 1919 (aged 58)
- Genres: Tango
- Occupations: Musician; songwriter
- Instruments: Vocals; guitar; harmonica

Ángel Gregorio Villoldo Arroyo (16 February 1861 – 14 October 1919) was an Argentine musician and an early pioneer of tango music. He was a lyricist, composer, and one of the major singers of the era, and he transformed the Spanish tanguillos, cuplés, and habaneras into Argentine rhythms. His most famous works include "El Choclo" and "La Morocha", two of the first tangos to achieve mass circulation and international success.

== Early life ==
Villoldo was born in the Buenos Aires neighborhood of Barracas in 1861. Before dedicating himself to music, he held various jobs, including as a typographer, tram driver, circus clown, and journalist. He learned to play guitar and sing largely on his own.

== Career ==
=== Theatre work ===
Villoldo became a regular figure in the Buenos Aires entertainment scene at the turn of the 20th century, and he wrote comic songs and cuplés for local theatres. According to poet and lyricist Horacio Ferrer, Villoldo collaborated with actors such as Pepe, Pablo Podestá, and Angelina Pagano, providing songs and sketches that were incorporated into their productions. Many of his tangos and songs debuted in the theatre before entering sheet music and recording circuits.

=== Songwriting and performance ===
When performing, Villoldo often played the guitar and harmonica, telling stories through song. In 1889, he published a compilation of cantos criollos (creole folk songs). His best-known tango, "El Choclo" (1903), became common in the repertoires of theatre orchestras. In 1905, he collaborated with Alfredo Eusebio Gobbi and his wife, the Chilean Flora Rodríguez—parents of bandleader and violinist Alfredo Gobbi—on "La Morocha", which became one of the first tangos to achieve mass circulation, with more than 280,000 copies of sheet music sold.

Other titles by Villoldo, such as "El Porteñito", "Cantar eterno"—(recorded in 1917 by the duo of Carlos Gardel and José Razzano)—and numerous cuplés, were widely performed in theatres and cafés. His lyrics often blended humor and topical references, reflecting his roots as a journalist and entertainer.

=== International dissemination and recordings ===
In 1907, under contract with the Buenos Aires department store Gath & Chaves, Villoldo traveled with Gobbi and Rodríguez to Paris, where they made pioneering tango recordings, including of "La Morocha" and "El Choclo". Within a few years, "El Choclo" was adopted by international ensembles, making Villoldo's composition one of the earliest tangos to circulate widely across continents.

==== Early recordings of "El Choclo" ====
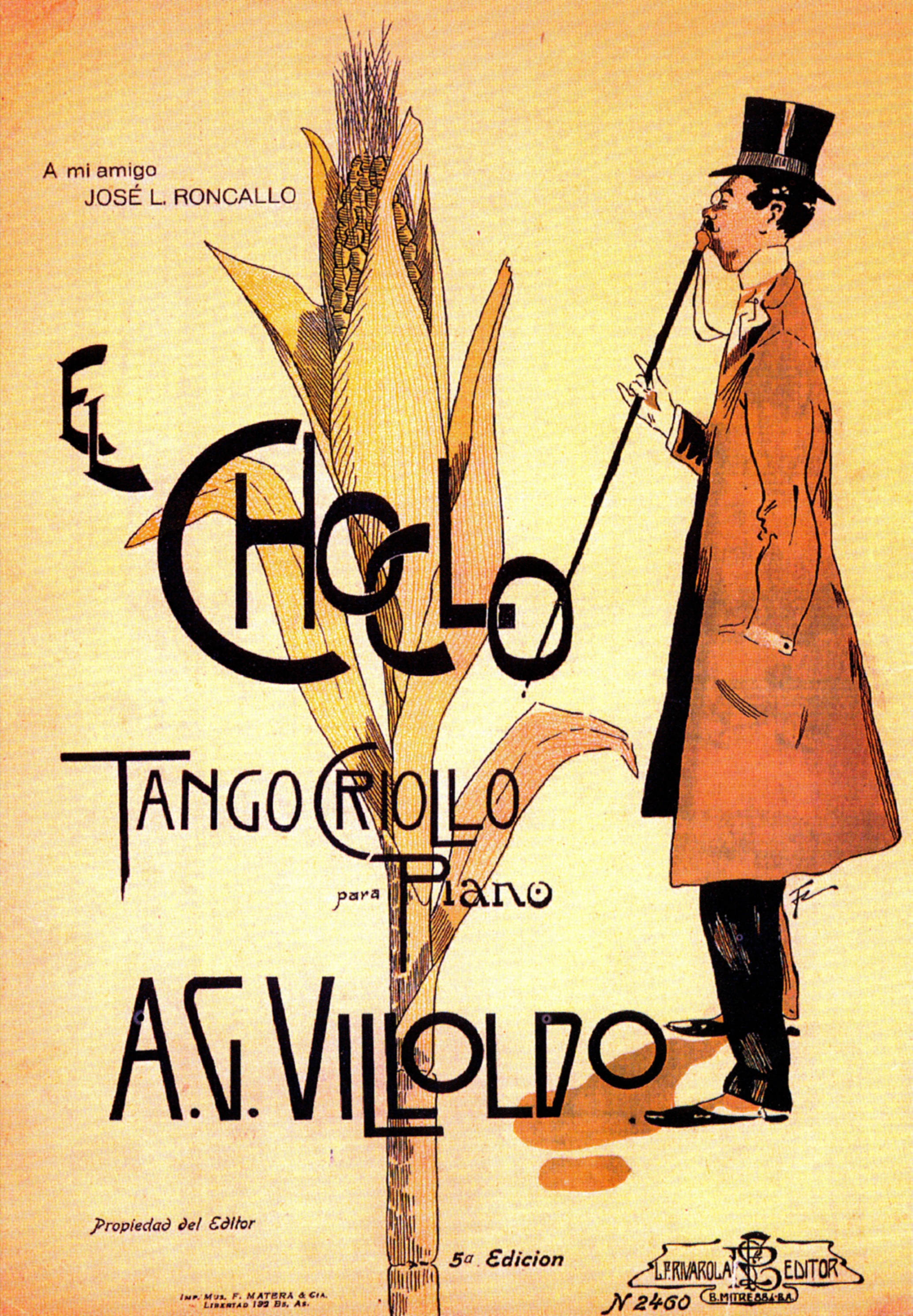
Cover of the sheet music for "El Choclo"

Year (approx.)	Ensemble / artist	Label / location	Notes
1905	Performed live by José Luis Roncallo	Hotel Americano, Buenos Aires	First known public performance
1907	Rondalla Vazquez	Odeón (Buenos Aires)	Among first tango discs recorded in Argentina
1907	Band of the Republican Guard (Paris)	Gath & Chaves (Paris)	One of the first European tango recordings
1907–08	Alfredo Eusebio Gobbi / Flora Rodríguez / Villoldo	Paris sessions (private / Gath & Chaves)	"La Morocha" and related tangos
1910s	Victor "Spanish Band"	Victor (U.S.)	Early international commercial issue

== Later years and death ==
By the 1910s, Villoldo's popularity was eclipsed by newer tango composers and professional singers, though his works remained in circulation. In 1916, he published a collection of recordings titled Argentine Popular Songs, commemorating the centennial of the Argentine Declaration of Independence. He died in Buenos Aires on 14 October 1919, at the age of 58.

== Legacy ==
Villoldo is remembered as "the father of tango song" ("el padre del tango canción"), a songwriter who bridged the stage, the street, and the recording studio. Works like "El Choclo" and "La Morocha" remain staples of the tango repertoire and are considered classics of Argentine popular culture. His pioneering efforts in Paris and the U.S. gave tango its first foothold on the international stage.

== Selected tangos ==
- "El Choclo" (1903)
- "La Morocha" (1905, with Alfredo Eusebio Gobbi and Flora Rodríguez)
- "El Porteñito" (c. 1900)
- "Cantar eterno"
