= Let's Dance (Slovak TV series) =

- Genre: Reality competition
- Based on: Strictly Come Dancing
- Directed by: Pepe Majeský
- Presented by: Adela Vinczeová; Martin "Pyco" Raush; Zuzana Fialová; Libor Bouček; Viktor Vincze; Martina "Maca" Zábranská; Lucia Hlaváčková; Jana Kovalčiková; Anna Jakab Rakovská; Adam Bardy
- Judges: Jozef Bednárik; Ján Ďurovčík; Dagmar Hubová; Tatiana Drexler; Elena Jágerská; Zuzana Fialová; Zdeněk Chlopčík; Dara Rolins; Petr Horáček; Adela Vinczeová; Jorge González; Ján Koleník; Adam Bardy; Laura Arcolinová; Richard Genzer
- Country of origin: Slovakia
- Original language: Slovak
- No. of seasons: 11
- No. of episodes: 112

Production
- Production location: Incheba
- Running time: 60–180 minutes

Original release
- Network: Markíza
- Release: October 8, 2006 – present

Let's Dance (in English) is the Slovak version of the British reality TV competition Strictly Come Dancing and is part of the Dancing with the Stars franchise. All seasons were broadcast by TV Markiza (1st in the autumn of 2006), hosted by Adela Vinczeová and Martin "Pyco" Rausch (both of them also hosted the program Slovensko hľadá SuperStar (Slovak version of Pop Idol) on STV in 2005 and 2006). The winners of 1st season were Zuzana Fialová (a noted Slovak actress) and Peter Modrovský (a professional dancer).

== Presenters & Judges ==
=== Cast timeline ===
Color key

Host
Co-host
Contestant
Professional dancer
Judge
Guest judge

Cast member	Seasons										
Cast member	1	2	3	4	5	6	7	8	9	10	11
Martin "Pyco" Rausch	●	●	●	●		●					
Adela Vinczeová	●	●	●	●	●	●	●	●	●		
Zuzana Fialová	●	●	●			●			●		●
Libor Bouček					●						
Viktor Vincze							●	●	●		
Jana Kovalčíková								●	●	●	●
Anna Jakab Rakovská									●	●	
Martina Zábranská							●				
Lucia Hlaváčková								●	●		
Ján Ďurovčík	●	●	●		●	●	●	●	●	●	●
Jozef Bednárik	●	●	●	●	●						
Dagmar Hubová	●		●	●							●
Elena Jágerská	●										
Tatiana Drexler		●	●	●		●	●	●	●	●	●
Zdeněk Chlopčík				●	●				●		
Dara Rolins					●					●	
Petr Horáček						●					
Jorge González							●				
Ján Koleník							●	●	●		●
Adam Bardy							●		●	●	●
Richard Genzer											●
Laura Arcolinová											●

== Professional dancers & their partners ==
Professional	Series 1	Series 2	Series 3	Series 4	Series 5	Series 6	Series 7	Series 8	Series 9	Series 10	Series 11
Adam Brešťanský	—N/a					Lenka Vavrinčíková	—N/a				
Adriana Mašková	—N/a						Marek Fašiang	—N/a			
Anna Riebauerová	—N/a							Vratko Sirági	—N/a		Jakub Jablonský
Barbora Jančinová	Juraj Bača	—N/a									
Csaba Adam	—N/a								Michaela Kocianová	—N/a	
David Schavel	—N/a					Silvia Lakatošová	—N/a				
Denisa Halická	Maroš Kramár	—N/a	Vincent Lukáč	—N/a							
Dodo Herák	—N/a				Petra Marko	—N/a					
Dominika Chrapeková	—N/a					Vladimír Kobielsky	—N/a				
Dominika Rošková	—N/a					Branislav Deák	Adam Bardy	Richard Autner	—N/a	Kristián Baran	Ján Koleník
Eliška Lenčešová	—N/a						Attila Végh	Boris Valábik	Jakub Jablonský	Peter Sagan	Kristián Baran
Erik Ňarjaš	Marianna Ďurianová	—N/a	Zora Czoborová	Simona Krainová	—N/a	Daniela Hantuchová	—N/a				
Fabio Bellucci	—N/a					Petra Vajdová	Viktória "Aicha" Niang	Helena Krajčiová	—N/a		Jana Hospodárová
Filip Buranský	—N/a					Emma Drobná	—N/a				
Filip Kucman	—N/a										Nela Pocisková
Ivana Gáborík (née. Surovcová)	—N/a	Martin Konrád	Filip Tůma	Marek Vašut	Peter Marcin	—N/a		Marián Gáborík	—N/a		
Jaroslav Ihring	—N/a								Anna Jakab Rakovská	Zuzana Porubjaková	Gabriela Marcinková
Jasmin Affašová	—N/a									Adam Šedro	—N/a
Joris Yacoub	—N/a							Mária Čírová	—N/a		
Julie Rezková	—N/a								Martin Novák	—N/a	
Juraj Fáber	—N/a	Marta Sládečková	—N/a								
Karol Brüll	—N/a	Silvia Šarköziová	—N/a								
Katarína Lacková	—N/a					Tomáš "Yxo" Dohňanský	—N/a				
Katarína Štumpfová	—N/a	Jozef Vajda	Juraj Mokrý	Miroslav Šmajda	—N/a						
Kristína Kamenická	Fero Mikloško	—N/a									
Ladislav Gerényi	—N/a	Miriam Kalisová	—N/a								
Lujza Tarajová	Jozef Golonka	—N/a									
Lukáš Hojdan	—N/a					Eva "Evelyn" Kramerová	—N/a				
Marcela Spišiaková	Jan Novotný	—N/a									
Marek Bureš	—N/a						Diana Mórová	—N/a			
Marek Klič	—N/a						Kristína Svarinská	Henrieta Farkašová	—N/a		
Marek Vrána	—N/a				Viktor Horján	—N/a					
Martina Reiterová	—N/a				Patrik Švajda	—N/a					
Matej Chren	Kateřina Brožová	—N/a	Iveta Bartošová	Elena Podzámska	Jana Hospodárová	—N/a				Zuzana Mauréry	—N/a
Matyáš Adamec	—N/a							Gabriela Marcinková	Petra Dubayová	Eva Burešová	Zuzana Porubjaková
Michaela Marková	—N/a	Milan Markovič	—N/a	Andy Hryc	Tomi Kid Kovacs	—N/a					
Milan Plačko	Helena Vondráčková	—N/a	Marcela Laiferová	Patrícia Vitteková	—N/a						
Mirka Kosorínová	Tomáš Bezdeda	—N/a	Martin Šmahel	Štefan Skrúcaný	—N/a						
Natália Glosíková	—N/a			Roman Pomajbo	Martin Mňahončák	—N/a			Ján Tribula	Juraj Kemka	Juraj Mokrý
Natália Horváthová	—N/a								Juraj Loj	Marek Rozkoš	Vladimír Kobielsky
Omar Topić	—N/a				Sisa Sklovská	—N/a					
Patrícia Martinovičová	—N/a					Michal Konrád	—N/a				
Patricia Piešťanská	—N/a								Juraj Bača	Šimon Jakuš	—N/a
Paulína Gašparíková	—N/a					Peter Varinský	—N/a				
Peter Modrovský	Zuzana Fialová	—N/a	Adela Banášová	Nela Pocisková	Gabriela Gunčíková	—N/a					
Petr Čadek	—N/a	Andrea Verešová	—N/a								
Radka Britňáková	—N/a							Milan Zimnýkoval	—N/a		
Róbert Pavlík	—N/a						Dominika Cibulková	—N/a	Hana Gregorová	—N/a	
Silvia Kadnárová	—N/a	Radoslav Židek	Fedor Flašík	—N/a							
Simona Brecíková	—N/a						Michal Kovačič	Victor Ibara	—N/a		
Štefan Čermák	—N/a			Eva Máziková	—N/a						
Titus Abrloh	—N/a									Ráchel Šoltésová	—N/a
Tomáš Antálek	—N/a			Martina Šimkovičová	Karin Haydu	—N/a					
Tomáš Surovec	—N/a	Michaela Čobejová	Petra Polnišová	—N/a	Alena Heribanová	—N/a					
Tomáš Uváček	—N/a				Katka Knechtová	—N/a					
Vanda Poláková	—N/a						Ján Koleník	Mario Cimarro (Week 1-2)	—N/a		
Vanesa Indrova	—N/a						František "Fero Joke" Košarišťan	Mario Cimarro	Ján Ďurica	—N/a	
Veronika Husárová	—N/a	Rastislav Žitný	—N/a								
Vilém Šír	—N/a						Zuzana Kubovčíkova Šebova	Jana Kovalčiková	Tina	Simona Leskovská	Petra Polnišová

Key:

Winner of the series
Second place of the series
Third place of the series
First elimination of the series
Withdrew in the series
Elimination of the series (2nd to last)
Unclassified

== Series overview ==
Season	No. of stars	No. of weeks	Duration dates	Partners in the finals		
Season	No. of stars	No. of weeks	Duration dates	First place	Second place	Third place
1) Fall 2006	10	10	Oct 8 – Dec 10	Zuzana Fialová & Peter Modrovský	Juraj Bača & Barbora Jančinová	Tomáš Bezdeda & Mirka Kosorínová
2) Spring 2008	10	10	Apr 27 – Jun 29	Michaela Čobejová & Tomáš Surovec	Radoslav Židek & Silvia Kadnárová	Andrea Verešová & Petr Čadek
3) Spring 2009	10	10	Apr 12 – Jun 14	Juraj Mokrý & Katarína Štumpfová	Petra Polnišová & Tomáš Surovec	Adela Banášová & Peter Modrovský
4) Spring 2010	11	11	Mar 21 – May 30	Nela Pocisková & Peter Modrovský	Eva Máziková & Štefan Čermák	Martina Šimkovičová & Tomáš Antálek
5) Fall 2011	12	11	Sep 9 – Nov 18	Jana Hospodárová & Matej Chren	Martin Mňahončák & Natália Glosíková	Peter Marcin & Ivana Surovcová
6) Fall 2017	11	10	Sep 3 – Nov 5	Vladimír Kobielsky & Dominika Chrapeková	Branislav Deák & Dominika Rošková	Silvia Lakatošová & David Schavel
7) Spring 2022	11	10	Mar 6 – May 8	Ján Koleník & Vanda Poláková	Adam Bardy & Dominika Rošková	Zuzana Kubovčíková Šebová & Vilem Šír
8) Spring 2023	12	10	Mar 5 – May 7	Jana Kovalčíková & Vilem Šír	Gabriela Marcinková & Matyáš Adamec	Vratko Sirági & Anna Riebauerová
9) Spring 2024	11	10	Mar 3 - May 5	Jakub Jablonský & Eliška Lenčešová	Juraj Loj & Natália Horváthová	Anna Jakab Rakovská & Jaroslav Ihring
10) Spring 2025	11	10	Mar 2 – May 4	Kristián Baran & Dominika Rošková	Zuzana Porubjaková & Jaroslav Ihring	Ráchel Šoltésová & Titus Abrloh
11) Spring 2026	10	10	Mar 8 – May 10	Zuzana Porubjaková & Matyáš Adamec	Ján Koleník & Dominika Rošková	Kristián Baran & Eliška Betáková Lenčešová

== Season 1 - 2006 ==
The ten couples featuring selected celebrities and their dancing partners:

Celebrity	Occupation / Known for	Dance partner	Status
Fero Mikloško	Fashion designer	Kristína Kamenická	Eliminated 1st on October 15, 2006
Jan Novotný	The Bachelor star	Marcela Spišiaková	Eliminated 2nd on October 22, 2006
Jozef Golonka	Former ice hockey player	Lujza Tarajová	Eliminated 3rd on October 29, 2006
Kateřina Brožová	Czech actress, singer	Matej Chren	Eliminated 4th on November 5, 2006
Helena Vondráčková	Czech singer	Milan Plačko	Eliminated 5th on November 12, 2006
Maroš Kramár	Actor	Denisa Halická	Eliminated 6th on November 19, 2006
Marianna Ďurianová	Newsreader	Erik Ňarjaš	Eliminated 7th on November 26, 2006
Tomáš Bezdeda	Singer	Mirka Kosorínová	Third Place on December 3, 2006
Juraj Bača	Olympic sprint canoer	Barbora Jančinová	Runner-up on December 10, 2006
Zuzana Fialová	Actress	Peter Modrovský	Winner on December 10, 2006

== Season 2 - 2008 ==
The ten couples featuring selected celebrities and their dancing partners:

Celebrity	Occupation / Known for	Dance partner	Status
Milan Markovič	Actor, humorist	Michaela Marková	Eliminated 1st on May 4, 2008
Silvia Šarköziová	Violinist	Karol Brüll	Eliminated 2nd on May 11, 2008
Martin Konrád	Singer	Ivana Surovcová	Eliminated 3rd on May 18, 2008
Marta Sládečková	Actress	Juraj Fáber	Eliminated 4th on May 25, 2008
Miriam Kalisová	Newsreader	Ladislav Gerényi	Eliminated 5th on June 1, 2008
Rastislav Žitný	Newsreader	Veronika Husárová	Eliminated 6th on June 8, 2008
Jozef Vajda	Actor	Katarína Štumpfová	Eliminated 7th on June 15, 2008
Andrea Verešová	Miss Slovakia 1999	Petr Čadek	Third Place on June 22, 2008
Radoslav Židek	Olympic snowboarder	Silvia Kadnárová	Runner-up on June 29, 2008
Michaela Čobejová	Actress	Tomáš Surovec	Winner on June 29, 2008

== Season 3 - 2009 ==
The ten couples featuring selected celebrities and their dancing partners:

Celebrity	Occupation / Known for	Dance partner	Status
Martin Šmahel	Model	Mirka Kosorínová	Eliminated 1st on April 19, 2009
Marcela Laiferová	Singer	Milan Plačko	Eliminated 2nd on April 26, 2009
Vincent Lukáč	Former ice hockey player	Denisa Halická	Eliminated 3rd on May 3, 2009
Zora Czoborová	Personal trainer	Erik Ňarjaš	Eliminated 4th on May 10, 2009
Filip Tůma	Actor, opera singer	Ivana Surovcová	Eliminated 5th on May 17, 2009
Fedor Flašík	Businessman	Silvia Kadnárová	Eliminated 6th on May 24, 2009
Iveta Bartošová	Czech singer	Matej Chren	Eliminated 7th on May 31, 2009
Adela Banášová	TV host	Peter Modrovský	Third Place on June 7, 2009
Petra Polnišová	Actress, comedian	Tomáš Surovec	Runner-up on June 14, 2009
Juraj Mokrý	Actor, comedian	Katarína Štumpfová	Winner on June 14, 2009

== Season 4 - 2010 ==
The eleven couples featuring selected celebrities and their dancing partners:

Celebrity	Occupation / Known for	Dance partner	Status
Marek Vašut	Czech actor	Ivana Surovcová	Eliminated 1st on March 28, 2010
Štefan Skrúcaný	Actor, singer	Mirka Kosorínová	Eliminated 2nd on April 4, 2010
Andy Hryc	Actor	Michaela Marková	Eliminated 3rd on April 11, 2010
Roman Pomajbo	Actor, comedian	Natália Glosíková	Eliminated 4th on April 18, 2010
Simona Krainová	Czech model	Erik Ňarjaš	Withdrew on April 25, 2010
Elena Podzámska	Actress	Matej Chren	Eliminated 5th on May 2, 2010
Patrícia Vitteková	Singer	Milan Plačko	Eliminated 6th on May 9, 2010
Miroslav Šmajda	Singer	Katarína Štumpfová	Withdrew on May 16, 2010
Martina Šimkovičová	Newsreader	Tomáš Antálek	Third Place on May 23, 2010
Eva Máziková	Singer	Štefan Čermák	Runner-up on May 30, 2010
Nela Pocisková	Actress, singer	Peter Modrovský	Winner on May 30, 2010

== Season 5 - 2011 ==
The twelve couples featuring selected celebrities and their dancing partners:

Celebrity	Occupation / Known for	Dance partner	Status
Karin Haydu	Actress	Tomáš Antálek	Eliminated 1st on September 9, 2011
Sisa Sklovská	Singer	Omar Topić	Eliminated 2nd on September 16, 2011
Katarína Knechtová	Singer	Tomáš Uváček	Eliminated 3rd on September 23, 2011
Tomi "Kid" Kovács	Boxer	Michaela Marková	Eliminated 4th on September 30, 2011
Alena Heribanová	TV host	Tomáš Surovec	Eliminated 5th on October 7, 2011
Gabriela Gunčíková	Czech singer	Peter Modrovský	Eliminated 6th on October 14, 2011
Patrik Švajda	Newsreader, former teacher	Martina Reiterová	Eliminated 7th on October 21, 2011
Viktor Horján	Actor	Marek Vrána	Eliminated 8th on October 28, 2011
Petra Marko	Businesswoman	Dodo Herák	Eliminated 9th on November 4, 2011
Peter Marcin	Actor, comedian	Ivana Surovcová	Third Place on November 11, 2011
Martin Mňahončák	Actor	Natália Glosíková	Runner-up on November 18, 2011
Jana Hospodárová	TV host	Matej Chren	Winner on November 18, 2011

== Season 6 - 2017 ==
The eleven couples featuring selected celebrities and their dancing partners:

Celebrity	Occupation / Known for	Dance partner	Status
Peter Varinský	Sports News host	Paulína Gašparíková	Eliminated 1st on September 10, 2017
Tomáš "Yxo" Dohňanský	Bass guitarist	Katarína Lacková	Eliminated 2nd on September 17, 2017
Daniela Hantuchová	Tennis player	Erik Ňarjaš	Eliminated 3rd on September 24, 2017
Petra Vajdová	Actress	Fabio Bellucci	Withdrew on October 8, 2017
Michal Konrád	Chef	Patrícia Martinovičová	Eliminated 5th on October 8, 2017
Lenka Vavrinčíková	Newsreader	Adam Brešťanský	Eliminated 6th on October 15, 2017
Emma Drobná	Winner of SuperStar 2015	Filip Buranský	Eliminated 7th on October 22, 2017
Eva "Evelyn" Kramerová	Comedian, actress	Lukáš Hojdan	Eliminated 8th on October 29, 2017
Silvia Lakatošová	Miss Czechoslovakia 1993	David Schavel	Third Place on November 5, 2017
Branislav Deák	Actor	Dominika Rošková	Runner-up on November 5, 2017
Vladimír Kobielsky	Actor	Dominika Chrapeková	Winner on November 5, 2017

== Season 7 - 2022 ==
The eleven couples featuring selected celebrities and their dancing partners:

Celebrity	Occupation / Known for	Dance partner	Status
Marek Fašiang	Actor	Adriana Mašková	Eliminated 1st on March 13, 2022
František "Fero Joke" Košarišťan	Comedian	Vanesa Indrová	Eliminated 2nd on March 20, 2022
Viktória "Aicha" Niang	Love Island contestant	Fabio Belluci	Eliminated 3rd on March 27, 2022
Michal Kovačič	TV Presenter	Simona Brecíková; Vanesa Indrová (week 5)	Eliminated 4th on April 3, 2022
Diana Mórová	Actress	Marek Bureš	Eliminated 5th on April 10, 2022
Kristína Svarinská	Actress	Marek Klič	Eliminated 6th on April 17, 2022
Dominika Cibulková	Tennis Player	Róbert Pavlík	Eliminated 7th on April 24, 2022
Attila Végh	MMA wrestler	Eliška Lenčešová	Eliminated 8th on May 1, 2022
Zuzana Šebová	Actress	Vilem Šír	Third Place on May 8, 2022
Adam Bardy	Actor, Honour Guard of the President	Dominika Rošková	Runner-up on May 8, 2022
Ján Koleník	Actor	Vanda Polaková	Winner on May 8, 2022

== Season 8 - 2023 ==
The eleven couples (and one spare pair) featuring selected celebrities and their dancing partners:

Celebrity	Occupation / Known for	Dance partner	Status
Victor Ibara	Actor	Simona Brecíková	Eliminated 1st on March 12, 2023
Mária Čírová	Singer	Joris Yacoub	Withdrew on March 17, 2023
Milan "Junior" Zimnýkoval	TV and radio host	Radka Britaňáková	Eliminated 2nd on March 19, 2023
Helena Krajčiová	Actress, singer	Fabio Bellucci	Eliminated 3rd on March 26, 2023
Henrieta Farkašová	Paralympic Alpine skier	Marek Klič	Eliminated 4th on April 2, 2023
Mario Cimarro	Actor	Vanesa Indrová; Vanda Poláková (Week 1 - 2)	Eliminated 5th on April 9, 2023
Boris Valábik	Retired NHL player	Eliška Lenčešová	Eliminated 6th on April 16, 2023
Richard Autner	Actor, musician	Dominika Rošková	Eliminated 7th on April 23, 2023
Marián Gáborík	Retired NHL player	Ivana Gáborík	Eliminated 8th on April 30, 2023
Vratko Sirági	Morning TV presenter	Anna Riebauerová	Third place on May 7, 2023
Gabriela Marcinková	Actress	Matyáš Adamec	Runner-up on May 7, 2023
Jana Kovalčiková	Actress	Vilém Šír	Winner on May 7, 2023

=== Scoring chart ===
Couple	Place	1	2	1+2	3	4	5	6	7	8	9	10
Jana & Vilém	1	26	22	48	28	37	31+3=34	39	35+3+38	40+35=75	30+38=68	40+40+40=120
Gabriela & Matyáš	2	22	34	56	35	25	39+1=40	25	34+1=35	36+31=67	38+40=78	39+40+40=119
Vratko & Anna	3				N/A	33	36+1=37	37	39+1=40	37+39=76	35+35=70	38+40+37=115
Marián & Ivana	4	20	23	43	25	30	25+3=28	28	29+3=32	30+30=60	25+29=54	
Richard & Dominika	5	28	32	60	27	38	30+3=33	29	30+3=33	27+38=65		
Boris & Eliška	6	13	9	22	26	18	16+1=17	21	27+1=28			
Mario & Vanesa	7	12	16	28	19	18	18+3=21	18				
Henrieta & Marek	8	28	29	57	21	—	21+1=22					
Helena & Fabio	9	28	26	54	37	24						
Junior & Radka	10	27	17	44	21							
Mária & Joris	11	20	—		—							
Victor & Simona	12	19	16	35								

=== Week 1 (5 March) ===
- Group performance: "Intoxicated" - Martin Solveig and GTA
- Emma Drobná performed the song "Bohemian Rhapsody" as a part of Helena Krajčiová & Fabio Belucci's waltz.
- On the first live show, no elimination took place, therefore all couples advanced to Week 2.

Order	Couple	Dance	Judges' scores				Total	Judges' scoreboard	Song
Order	Couple	Dance	Koleník	Drexler	Vinczeová	Ďurovčík	Total	Judges' scoreboard	Song
1	Gabriela Marcinková & Matyáš Adamec	Cha-Cha-Cha	6	5	7	4	22	4th	"I'm Every Woman" - Whitney Houston
2	Boris Valábik & Eliška Lenčešová	Quickstep	3	3	5	2	13	7th	"Viva Las Vegas" - Elvis Presley
3	Mária Čírová & Joris Yacoub	Waltz	6	4	6	4	20	=5th	"Ave Maria"
4	Milan "Junior" Zimnýkoval & Radka Britoňáková	Jive	7	7	8	5	27	2nd	"Let's Twist Again" - Chubby Checker
5	Victor Ibara & Simona Brecíková	Cha-Cha-Cha	5	5	6	3	19	6th	"There's Nothing Holdin' Me Back" - Shawn Mendes
6	Helena Krajčiová & Fabio Bellucci	Waltz	8	7	8	5	28	=1st	"Bohemian Rhapsody" - Queen
7	Jana Kovalčiková & Vilém Šír	Jive	7	6	8	5	26	3rd	"Higher Power" - Coldplay
8	Richard Autner & Dominika Rošková	Waltz	8	6	8	6	28	=1st	"Valse du palais 1"
9	Marián Gáborík & Ivana Gáborík	Quickstep	5	5	6	4	20	=5th	"I'm Still Standing" - Elton John
10	Henrieta Farkašová & Marek Klič	Viennese Waltz	8	8	8	4	28	=1st	"Fénix" - Lucie Bílá
11	Mario Cimarro & Vanda Poláková	Cha-Cha-Cha	3	2	5	2	12	8th	"I Like It Like That" - Pete Rodriguez

=== Week 2 (12 March) ===
- Judges' scores from week 1 were added to this week's scores. They were then combined with the audience's votes and the couple with the least overall points was eliminated.
- Mária Čírová suffered an injury, therefore she was unable to perform. According to the rules, together with her partner, they were given a bye to the following week.

Order	Couple	Dance	Judges' scores				Total	Total (Week 1 + Week 2)	Judges' scoreboard	Song	Result
Order	Couple	Dance	Koleník	Drexler	Vinczeová	Ďurovčík	Total	Total (Week 1 + Week 2)	Judges' scoreboard	Song	Result
1	Helena Krajčiová & Fabio Bellucci	Jive	7	7	7	5	26	54	4th	"Footloose" - Kenny Loggins	Safe
2	Marián Gáborík & Ivana Gáborík	Rumba	6	6	7	4	23	43	7th	"Read All About It" - Emeli Sandé	Safe
3	Gabriela Marcinková & Matyáš Adamec	Quickstep	9	8	10	7	34	56	3rd	"Dr. Bones" - Cherry Poppin' Daddies	Safe
4	Victor Ibara & Simona Brecíková	Waltz	5	3	5	3	16	35	8th	"Lovely" - Billie Eilish and Khalid	Eliminated
5	Boris Valábik & Eliška Lenčešová	Cha-Cha-Cha	2	2	4	1	9	22	10th	"Sharks" - Imagine Dragons	Bottom two
6	Jana Kovalčiková & Vilém Šír	Viennese Waltz	6	4	7	5	22	48	5th	"Cigaretka na dva ťahy" - Richard Müller	Safe
7	Richard Autner & Dominika Rošková	Rumba	7	9	9	7	32	60	1st	"Supermarket Flowers" - Ed Sheeran	Safe
8	Milan "Junior" Zimnýkoval & Radka Britaňáková	Viennese Waltz	5	3	5	4	17	44	6th	"Láska" - Marcel Palonder	Safe
9	Mario Cimarro & Vanda Poláková	Quickstep	5	3	5	3	16	28	9th	"Dancin' Fool" - Barry Manilow	Safe
10	Henrieta Farkašová & Marek Klič	Rumba	8	7	8	6	29	57	2nd	"Beautiful" - Christina Aguilera	Safe

=== Week 3 (19 March) ===
- Theme: Movies
- Due to testing positive for COVID-19, Mario Cimarro's partner Vanda Poláková was permanently replaced by Vanesa Indrová.
- Mária Čírová withdrew from the competition on March 17, 2023, due to an injury, which she sustained a week before.
- Vratko Sirági joined the competition as a replacement for Mária Čírová together with his partner Anna Riebauerová. They were granted immunity and didn't face the elimination as well as the judges' scores, therefore they automatically advanced to Week 4.

Order	Couple	Dance	Judges' scores				Total	Judges' scoreboard	Song	Result
Order	Couple	Dance	Koleník	Drexler	Vinczeová	Ďurovčík	Total	Judges' scoreboard	Song	Result
1	Vratko Sirági & Anna Riebauerová	Cha-cha-cha	N/A	N/A	N/A	N/A	N/A	N/A	"It's Raining Men" - Geri Halliwell from Magic Mike	Immune; advanced to Week 4
2	Jana Kovalčiková & Vilém Šír	Paso doble	7	7	8	6	28	3rd	"He's a Pirate" - from Pirates of the Caribbean	Bottom two
3	Marián Gáborík & Ivana Gáborík	Tango	7	6	7	5	25	6th	Theme from Game Of Thrones	Bottom three
4	Helena Krajčiová & Fabio Bellucci	Quickstep	10	9	10	8	37	1st	"Cabaret" - Liza Minnelli from Cabaret	Safe
5	Henrieta Farkašová & Marek Klič	Slowfox	6	5	6	4	21	=7th	"Beauty and the Beast" - Ariana Grande ft. John Legend from Beauty and the Beast	Safe
6	Richard Autner & Dominika Rošková	Quickstep	9	4	10	4	27	4th	"Hey Pachuco" - Royal Crown Revue from The Mask	Safe
7	Boris Valábik & Eliška Lenčešová	Viennese Waltz	6	7	8	5	26	5th	"Severní vítr" - Jaroslav Uhlíř from Vrchní, prchni	Safe
8	Mario Cimarro & Vanesa Indrová	Paso doble	5	4	6	4	19	8th	"Canción Del Mariachi" - Antonio Banderas, Los Lobos from Desperado	Safe
9	Milan "Junior" Zimnýkoval & Radka Britaňáková	Rumba	6	4	6	5	21	=7th	"I See You" - Leona Lewis from Avatar	Eliminated
10	Gabriela Marcinková & Matyáš Adamec	Samba	9	9	10	7	35	2nd	"(I've Had) The Time of My Life" - Bill Medley ft. Jennifer Warnes from Dirty Dancing	Safe

=== Week 4 (26 March) ===
- Theme: Love
- Group performance: "Crazy What Love Can Do" - David Guetta feat. Becky Hill & Ella Henderson
- Due to Henrieta testing positive for COVID-19, Henrieta & Marek were not able to perform. Under the rules of the competition, they were given a bye to the following week.

Order	Couple	Dance	Judges' scores				Total	Judges' scoreboard	Song	Result
Order	Couple	Dance	Koleník	Drexler	Vinczeová	Ďurovčík	Total	Judges' scoreboard	Song	Result
1	Helena Krajčiová & Fabio Bellucci	Rumba	6	5	7	6	24	6th	"Diamonds" - Rihanna	Eliminated
2	Richard Autner & Dominika Rošková	Paso doble	10	10	10	8	38	1st	"O fortuna"	Safe
3	Marián Gáborík & Ivana Gáborík	Samba	7	7	9	7	30	4th	"Love Is In The Air" - John Paul Young	Bottom three
4	Jana Kovalčiková & Vilém Šír	Waltz	9	10	9	9	37	2nd	"I'm Kissing You" - Des'ree	Safe
5	Boris Valábik & Eliška Lenčešová	Paso doble	5	3	6	4	18	=7th	"Don't Let Me Be Misunderstood" - Santa Esmeralda	Bottom four
6	Mario Cimarro & Vanesa Indrová	Viennese Waltz	5	4	6	3	18	=7th	"When A Man Loves A Woman" - Micheal Bolton	Safe
7	Gabriela Marcinková & Matyáš Adamec	Slowfox	7	6	7	5	25	5th	"Crazy In Love" - Beyoncé	Bottom two
8	Vratko Sirági & Anna Riebauerová	Tango	9	8	9	7	33	3rd	"Allegretto"	Safe

=== Week 5 (2 April) ===
- This week featured group battles in Argentine Tango.

Group 1: Marián & Ivana, Jana & Vilém, Mario & Vanesa, Richard & Dominika

Group 2 : Henrieta & Marek, Boris & Eliška, Vratko & Anna, Gabriela & Matyáš

- The winning team was awarded 3 points, the losing 1 point. The points were added to couples' individual scores.

Order	Couple	Dance	Judges' scores				Total	Song	Group Argentine Tango	Song	Final total	Judges' scoreboard	Result
Order	Couple	Dance	Koleník	Drexler	Vinczeová	Ďurovčík	Total	Song	Group Argentine Tango	Song	Final total	Judges' scoreboard	Result
1	Henrieta Farkašová & Marek Klič	Jive	5	5	6	5	21	"Dear Future Husband" - Meghan Trainor	Group 1 (Team Yellow) Score: 3	"Historia De Un Amor" - Héctor Varela	22	6th	Eliminated
2	Richard Autner & Dominika Rošková	Slowfox	7	8	8	7	30	"Fly Me To The Moon" - Frank Sinatra	Group 1 (Team Yellow) Score: 3	"Historia De Un Amor" - Héctor Varela	33	4th	Bottom four
3	Marián Gáborík & Ivana Gáborík	Viennese Waltz	6	6	7	6	25	"It's A Man's Man's Man's World" - James Brown	Group 1 (Team Yellow) Score: 3	"Historia De Un Amor" - Héctor Varela	28	5th	Safe
4	Mario Cimarro & Vanesa Indrová	Samba	5	4	5	4	18	"La Vida Es Un Carnaval" - Celia Cruz	Group 1 (Team Yellow) Score: 3	"Historia De Un Amor" - Héctor Varela	21	7th	Bottom three
5	Jana Kovalčiková & Vilém Šír	Cha-cha-cha	8	7	9	7	31	"AIn't No Other Man" - Christina Aguilera	Group 2 (Team Red) Score: 1	"Historia De Un Amor" - Héctor Varela	34	3rd	Safe
6	Boris Valábik & Eliška Lenčešová	Slowfox	4	4	4	4	16	"Big Spender" - Peggy Lee	Group 2 (Team Red) Score: 1	"Historia De Un Amor" - Héctor Varela	17	8th	Bottom two
7	Vratko Sirági & Anna Riebauerová	Jive	9	9	10	8	36	"Wake Me Uo Before You Go Go" - Wham!	Group 2 (Team Red) Score: 1	"Historia De Un Amor" - Héctor Varela	37	2nd	Safe
8	Gabriela Marcinková & Matyáš Adamec	Paso doble	10	10	10	9	39	"Unstoppable" - E. S. Posthumus	Group 2 (Team Red) Score: 1	"Historia De Un Amor" - Héctor Varela	40	1st	Safe

=== Week 6 (9 April) ===
- Theme: Folklore/Easter
- Opening performance: Cast of Na skle maľované - "Lipová lyžka/Prišli sme k vám s muzikou"
- Guest performance: Children's folklore group Prvosienka
- This week featured the folk dance marathon - Raslavická polka. This dance marathon was not marked by the judges.

Order	Couple	Dance	Judges' scores				Total	Judges' scoreboard	Song	Result
Order	Couple	Dance	Koleník	Drexler	Vinczeová	Ďurovčík	Total	Judges' scoreboard	Song	Result
1	Boris Valábik & Eliška Lenčešová	Jive	5	5	6	5	21	6th	"Don't Worry Be Happy" - Bobby McFerrin	Bottom two
2	Marián Gáborík & Ivana Gáborík	Cha-Cha-Cha	7	6	8	7	28	4th	"Can You Feel It" - The Jackson 5	Safe
3	Vratko Sirági & Anna Riebauerová	Waltz	9	10	10	8	37	2nd	"Call Out My Name" - The Weeknd	Safe
4	Mario Cimarro & Vanesa Indrová	Tango	5	4	5	4	18	7th	"El Tango De Roxanne" - Ewan McGregor	Eliminated
5	Jana Kovalčiková & Vilém Šír	Quickstep	10	10	10	9	39	1st	"Rehab" - The Glee Cast	Safe
6	Richard Autner & Dominika Rošková	Samba	7	8	8	6	29	3rd	"Bamboléo" - Gipsy Kings	Bottom four
7	Gabriela Marcinková & Matyáš Adamec	Viennese Waltz	6	6	7	6	25	5th	"Powerful" - Major Lazer ft. Ellie Goulding	Bottom three

=== Week 7 (16 April) ===
- Theme: Music icons
- Opening performance: "Slave To The Rhythm/ Smooth Criminal/ The Way You Make Me Feel/ Wanna Be Startin' Somethin'" - Michael Jackson
- Guest performance: "Úsmev/ Vyznanie" - Cast of Vyznanie
- This week featured team battles in salsa. The celebrities performed without their professional partners. The winning team was awarded 3 points, the losing 1 point. The points were added to couples' individual scores.

Team A: Gabriela Marcinková, Boris Valábik, Vratko Sirági

Team B: Richard Autner, Marián Gáborík, Jana Kovalčiková

Order	Couple	Dance	Judges' scores				Total	Song	Team salsa	Song	Final total	Judges' scoreboard	Result
Order	Couple	Dance	Koleník	Drexler	Vinczeová	Ďurovčík	Total	Song	Team salsa	Song	Final total	Judges' scoreboard	Result
1	Vratko Sirági & Anna Riebauerová	Rumba	10	10	10	9	39	"Purple Rain" - Prince	Team A Score: 1	"Quimbara" - Celia Cruz	40	1st	Safe
2	Richard Autner & Dominika Rošková	Tango	8	7	8	7	30	"One Night Only" - Jennifer Hudson	Team A Score: 1	"Quimbara" - Celia Cruz	33	4th	Safe
3	Marián Gáborík & Ivana Gáborík	Waltz	7	7	8	7	29	"Always Remember Us This Way" - Lady Gaga	Team A Score: 1	"Quimbara" - Celia Cruz	32	5th	Bottom two
4	Gabriela Marcinková & Matyáš Adamec	Rumba	9	8	9	8	34	"Koloseum" - Marika Gombitová	Team B Score: 3	"Conga" - Gloria Estefan	35	3rd	Safe
5	Boris Valábik & Eliška Lenčešová	Tango	7	5	9	6	27	"Učiteľka tanca" - Pavol Hammel	Team B Score: 3	"Conga" - Gloria Estefan	28	6th	Eliminated
6	Jana Kovalčiková & Vilém Šír	Samba	9	9	9	8	35	"Spice Up Your Life" - Spice Girls	Team B Score: 3	"Conga" - Gloria Estefan	38	2nd	Safe

=== Week 8 (23 April) ===
- Guest performance: Laura Zmajkovičová & Massimo Arcolin - Paso doble (Gangsta's Paradise" - 2WEI)
- The couples performed two individual dances, the second being contemporary.

Order	Couple	Dance	Judges' scores				Total	Final total	Song	Judges' scoreboard	Result
Order	Couple	Dance	Koleník	Drexler	Vinczeová	Ďurovčík	Total	Final total	Song	Judges' scoreboard	Result
1	Vratko Sirági & Anna Riebauerová	Quickstep	10	9	10	8	37	76	"Let's Go Crazy" - Prince & The Revolution	1st	Safe
6	Vratko Sirági & Anna Riebauerová	Contemporary	10	10	10	9	39	76	"Toxic" - 2WEI	1st	Safe
2	Gabriela Marcinková & Matyáš Adamec	Contemporary	9	9	10	8	36	67	"River" - Bishop Briggs	3rd	Bottom two
7	Gabriela Marcinková & Matyáš Adamec	Tango	8	7	8	8	31	67	"Tango Orquestra" - Osvaldo Pugliese	3rd	Bottom two
3	Richard Autner & Dominika Rošková	Jive	7	6	8	6	27	65	"Hound Dog" - Elvis Presley	4th	Eliminated
8	Richard Autner & Dominika Rošková	Contemporary	10	9	10	9	38	65	"Leave a Light On" - Tom Walker	4th	Eliminated
4	Marián Gáborík & Ivana Gáborík	Contemporary	8	7	9	6	30	60	"Sweet Dreams (Are Made Of This)" - Eurythmics	5th	Safe
9	Marián Gáborík & Ivana Gáborík	Paso doble	8	7	8	7	30	60	"Tamacun" - Rodrigo y Gabriela	5th	Safe
5	Jana Kovalčiková & Vilém Šír	Slowfox	10	10	10	10	40	75	"Fever" - Michael Bublé	2nd	Safe
10	Jana Kovalčiková & Vilém Šír	Contemporary	9	8	10	8	35	75	"Another Love" - Tom Odell	2nd	Safe

=== Week 9: Semi-final (30 April) ===
- Opening performance: "Switch" - Will Smith/"Single Ladies (Put a RIng on It)" - Destiny's Child/"Freedom" - Pharrell Williams/"Rosa Parks" - Outkast
- This week featured the dance-off. Two couples with the least overall points went head-to-head and the judges picked the last couple to make it to the final.
- Mária Čírová performed the song "All of Me" as a part of Marián & Ivana's slowfox.

Order	Couple	Dance	Judges' scores				Total	Final total	Song	Judges' scoreboard	Result	Dance-off		
Order	Couple	Dance	Koleník	Drexler	Vinczeová	Ďurovčík	Total	Final total	Song	Judges' scoreboard	Result	Dance	Song	Result
1	Vratko Sirági & Anna Riebauerová	Paso doble	10	8	9	8	35	70	"Uccen" - Taalbi Brothers	2nd	Safe	N/A		
5	Vratko Sirági & Anna Riebauerová	Slowfox	9	8	9	9	35	70	"Sign of the Times" - Harry Styles	2nd	Safe	N/A		
2	Marián Gáborík & Ivana Gáborík	Jive	6	6	7	6	25	54	"Livin' La Vida Loca" - Ricky Martin	4th	Bottom two	Cha-cha-cha	"Boogie Wonderland" - Earth, Wind & Fire	Eliminated
6	Marián Gáborík & Ivana Gáborík	Slowfox	7	7	8	7	29	54	"All of Me" - John Legend	4th	Bottom two	Cha-cha-cha	"Boogie Wonderland" - Earth, Wind & Fire	Eliminated
3	Jana Kovalčiková & Vilém Šír	Rumba	8	7	8	7	30	68	"Halo" - Beyoncé	3rd	Safe	N/A		
7	Jana Kovalčiková & Vilém Šír	Tango	10	9	10	9	38	68	"Toccata and Fugue" - J. S. Bach	3rd	Safe	N/A		
4	Gabriela Marcinková & Matyáš Adamec	Jive	10	9	10	9	38	78	"Shake It Off" - Taylor Swift	1st	Bottom two	Cha-cha-cha	"Boogie Wonderland" - Earth, Wind & Fire	Advanced to final
8	Gabriela Marcinková & Matyáš Adamec	Waltz	10	10	10	10	40	78	"Nothing Else Matters" - Metallica	1st	Bottom two	Cha-cha-cha	"Boogie Wonderland" - Earth, Wind & Fire	Advanced to final

=== Final (7 May) ===
- Opening performance: Class of 2023; "Land of 1000 Dances" - Wilson Pickett
- Special performance: Ján Koleník and the professionals; "Beggin'" - Måneskin (Cha-cha-cha)
- The couples performed 3 individual dances consisting of a judges' pick, one previously performed dance and a showdance.

Order	Couple	Dance	Judges' scores				Total	Final total	Song	Judges' scoreboard	Result
Order	Couple	Dance	Koleník	Drexler	Vinczeová	Ďurovčík	Total	Final total	Song	Judges' scoreboard	Result
1	Gabriela Marcinková & Matyáš Adamec	Quickstep (Week 2)	10	9	10	10	39	119	"Dr. Bones" - Cherry Poppin' Daddies	2nd	Runners-up
4	Gabriela Marcinková & Matyáš Adamec	Cha-cha-cha (judges' pick)	10	10	10	10	40	119	"Cake By The Ocean" - DNCE	2nd	Runners-up
7	Gabriela Marcinková & Matyáš Adamec	Showdance	10	10	10	10	40	119	"Run Boy Run" - Woodkid	2nd	Runners-up
2	Vratko Sirági & Anna Riebauerová	Rumba (judges' pick)	10	9	10	9	38	115	"Easy on Me" - Adele	3rd	3rd place
5	Vratko Sirági & Anna Riebauerová	Tango (Week 4)	10	10	10	10	40	115	"Allegreto" - BOND	3rd	3rd place
8	Vratko Sirági & Anna Riebauerová	Showdance	9	9	10	9	37	115	"A Million Dreams/From Now On" - The Greatest Showman	3rd	3rd place
3	Jana Kovalčiková & Vilém Šír	Quickstep (Week 6)	10	10	10	10	40	120	"Rehab" - The Glee Cast	1st	Winners
6	Jana Kovalčiková & Vilém Šír	Paso doble (judges' pick)	10	10	10	10	40	120	"España cañí" - Pascual Marquina Narro	1st	Winners
9	Jana Kovalčiková & Vilém Šír	Showdance	10	10	10	10	40	120	"Brother" - Matt Corby	1st	Winners

== Season 9 - 2024 ==
This season's judging panel consists of 3 judges, after Ján Koleník's departure from the show, which he announced at the end of Season 8.

This season featured guest judges on each week, therefore completing the judges' desk up to four judges each week.

The eleven couples featuring selected celebrities and their dancing partners.

Celebrity	Occupation / Known for	Dance partner	Status
Michaela Kocianová	Top model	Csaba Adam	Eliminated 1st on March 10, 2024
Ján Ďurica	Former football player	Vanesa Indrová	Eliminated 2nd on March 17, 2024
Hana Gregorová	Actress	Róbert Pavlík	Eliminated 3rd on March 24, 2024
Juraj Bača	Actor, TV presenter	Patricia Piešťanská	Eliminated 4th on March 31, 2024
Martin Novák	Chef, TV presenter	Julie Rezková	Eliminated 5th on April 7, 2024
Ján Tribula	Journalist	Natália Glosíková	Eliminated 6th on April 14, 2024
Tina	Singer	Vilém Šír	Eliminated 7th on April 21, 2024
Petra Dubayová	Actress, singer	Matyáš Adamec	Eliminated 8th on April 28, 2024
Anna Jakab Rakovská	Actress, comedian	Jaroslav Ihring	Third place on May 5, 2024
Juraj Loj	Actor	Natália Horváthová	Runner-up on May 5, 2024
Jakub Jablonský	Actor	Eliška Lenčešová	Winner on May 5, 2024

=== Scoring chart ===
Couple	Place	1	2	1+2	3	4	5	6	7	8	9	10	Average
Jakub & Eliška	1	31	30	61	36	34	38	27+7=34	40+39=79	40+39=79	38+40=78	40+38+40=118	36.67
Juraj L. & Nátalia H.	2	23	33	56	26	28	25	39+6=45	37+35=72	32+40=72	36+40=76	40+38+40=118	34.13
Anna & Jaroslav	3	25	26	51	35	26	29	32+4=36	39+30=69	34+36=70	34+38=72	39+40+40=119	33.53
Petra & Matyáš	4	17	28	45	22	19	30	25+5=30	34+31=65	31+37=68	34+35=69		28.58
Tina & Vilém	5	19	28	47	21	24	32	32+3=35	33+36=69	28+33=61			28.60
Ján T. & Natália G.	6	13	25	38	21	16	18	25+1=26	26+28=54				21.50
Martin & Julie	7	15	17	32	26	18	18	19+2=21					18.83
Juraj B. & Patricia	8	20	24	44	26	28	26						24.80
Hana & Róbert	9	25	22	47	24	14							21.25
Ján Ď. & Vanesa	10	18	24	42	23								21.67
Michaela & Csaba	11	15	19	34									17.00

=== Week 1 (3 March) ===
- Guest judge: Facundo Arana
- Opening performance: "Scherzo" from Symphony no. 9 - Ludwig van Beethoven / "Free" - Ultra Naté
- This week did not feature an elimination. The scores were carried over to the next week.

Order	Couple	Dance	Judges' scores				Total	Judges' scoreboard	Music
Order	Couple	Dance	Arana	Vinczeová	Drexler	Ďurovčík	Total	Judges' scoreboard	Music
1	Juraj Loj & Natália Horváthová	Waltz	8	6	5	4	23	3rd	"Time" - Hans Zimmer
2	Tina & Vilém Šír	Jive	8	5	3	3	19	5th	"Proud Mary" - Tina Turner
3	Martin Novák & Julie Rezková	Slowfox	5	5	4	1	15	=8th	"Mám rád" - Miroslav Žbirka
4	Anna Jakab Rakovská & Jaroslav Ihring	Quickstep	7	7	6	5	25	=2nd	"Part-Time Lover" - Stevie Wonder
5	Ján Tribula & Natália Glosíková	Cha-cha-cha	5	4	2	2	13	9th	"Bella Ciao" - Jan Bendig
6	Jakub Jablonský & Eliška Lenčešová	Quickstep	10	8	7	6	31	1st	"Sing Sing Sing" - Benny Goodman
7	Michaela Kocianová & Csaba Ádam	Cha-cha-cha	6	4	3	2	15	=8th	"Supermodel" - Måneskin
8	Ján Ďurica & Vanesa Indrová	Jive	5	5	5	3	18	6th	"Dance With Me Tonight" - Olly Murs
9	Petra Dubayová & Matyáš Adamec	Slowfox	6	5	3	3	17	7th	Dunaj, k vašim službám - Theme song
10	Juraj Bača & Patrícia Piešťanská	Cha-cha-cha	7	6	4	3	20	4th	"She's a Lady" - Tom Jones
11	Hana Gregorová & Róbert Pavlík	Waltz	8	7	6	4	25	=2nd	"Chci tě líbat" - Václav Neckář (Ondřej Brzobohatý)

=== Week 2 (10 March) ===
- Guest judge: Petra Polnišová
- Judges' scores from Week 1 were combined with this week's scores. Later they were combined with the viewer votes and the couple with the least overall points was eliminated.

Order	Couple	Dance	Judges' scores				Total	Total (Week 1 + Week 2)	Judges' scoreboard	Music	Result
Order	Couple	Dance	Polnišová	Drexler	Vinczeová	Ďurovčík	Total	Total (Week 1 + Week 2)	Judges' scoreboard	Music	Result
1	Juraj Bača & Patrícia Piešťanská	Quickstep	7	5	7	5	24	44	6th	"Puttin' On the Ritz" - Gregory Porter	Bottom two
2	Anna Jakab Rakovská & Jaroslav Ihring	Rumba	9	4	7	6	26	51	3rd	"Vampire" - Olivia Rodrigo	Safe
3	Martin Novák & Julie Rezková	Cha-cha-cha	6	3	5	3	17	32	10th	"Don't Worry" - Madcon feat. Ray Dalton	Bottom three
4	Petra Dubayová & Matyáš Adamec	Jive	8	7	8	5	28	45	5th	"Trouble" - Shampoo	Safe
5	Ján Ďurica & Vanesa Indrová	Waltz	7	5	7	5	24	42	7th	"Come Away With Me" - Norah Jones	Safe
6	Ján Tribula & Natália Glosíková	Quickstep	10	4	7	4	25	38	8th	"I Love Me" - Meghan Trainor feat. LunchMoney Lewis	Safe
7	Hana Gregorová & Róbert Pavlík	Cha-cha-cha	7	5	6	4	22	47	=4th	"Mambo Italiano" - Bette Midler	Safe
8	Juraj Loj & Natália Horváthová	Cha-cha-cha	10	8	9	6	33	56	2nd	"Welcome to the Jungle" - Guns N' Roses	Safe
9	Tina & Vilém Šír	Waltz	9	6	8	5	28	47	=4th	"You Light Up My Life" - Whitney Houston	Safe
10	Michaela Kocianová & Csaba Ádám	Quickstep	6	3	6	5	19	34	9th	"Valerie" - Amy Winehouse	Eliminated
11	Jakub Jablonský & Eliška Lenčešová	Rumba	9	7	9	5	30	61	1st	"The Lady in Red" - Chris de Burgh	Safe

=== Week 3 (17 March) ===
- Theme: Musicals
- Guest judge: Nela Pocisková
- Opening performance: "Mám ťa rád" - The Duchon's

Order	Couple	Dance	Judges' scores				Total	Judges' scoreboard	Music	Result
Order	Couple	Dance	Pocisková	Drexler	Vinczeová	Ďurovčík	Total	Judges' scoreboard	Music	Result
1	Petra Dubayová & Matyáš Adamec	Tango	8	5	6	3	22	6th	"El Tango de Roxanne" - Ewan McGregor from Moulin Rouge	Bottom three
2	Ján Ďurica & Vanesa Indrová	Paso doble	6	6	6	5	23	5th	"America" from West Side Story	Eliminated
3	Juraj Loj & Natália Horváthová	Quickstep	8	7	7	4	26	=3rd	"Na kolena" - Ivan Hlas from Big Beat (Šakalí léta)	Safe
4	Martin Novák & Julie Rezková	Waltz	7	7	7	5	26	=3rd	"Never Enough" - Loren Allred from The Greatest Showman	Safe
5	Juraj Bača & Patrícia Piešťanská	Jive	7	6	7	6	26	=3rd	"Shakin' At The High School Hop" from Grease	Safe
6	Hana Gregorová & Róbert Pavlík	Quickstep	8	5	6	5	24	4th	"Hello, Dolly!" - Louis Armstrong from Hello, Dolly!	Bottom four
7	Jakub Jablonský & Eliška Lenčešová	Slowfox	10	9	10	7	36	1st	"Singin' in the Rain" - Gene Kelly from Singin' in the Rain	Safe
8	Tina & Vilém Šír	Rumba	7	4	6	4	21	=7th	"Lásko má, já stůňu" - Helena Vondráčková from A Night at Karlstein (Noc na Karlštejně)	Bottom two
9	Ján Tribula & Natália Glosíková	Rumba	6	5	6	4	21	=7th	"Ak nie si moja" - Vašo Patejdl from Eighth Continent (Ôsmy svetadiel)	Safe
10	Anna Jakab Rakovská & Jaroslav Ihring	Tango	10	8	10	7	35	2nd	"Cell Block Tango" from Chicago	Safe

=== Week 4 (24 March) ===
- Theme: Love/Dances dedicated to loved ones
- Guest judge: Zdeněk Chlopčík
- Opening performance: "Gimme Love" - Sia

Order	Couple	Dance	Judges' scores				Total	Judges' scoreboard	Music	Result
Order	Couple	Dance	Chlopčík	Drexler	Vinczeová	Ďurovčík	Total	Judges' scoreboard	Music	Result
1	Juraj Bača & Patrícia Piešťanská	Viennese Waltz	7	6	8	7	28	=2nd	"C'est la vie" - Karel Gott	Safe
2	Tina & Vilém Šír	Tango	5	6	7	6	24	4th	"La cumparsita" - Gerardo Matos Rodríguez	Safe
3	Martin Novák & Julie Rezková	Paso doble	4	4	6	4	18	6th	"España cañí" - Pascual Marquina Narro	Bottom two
4	Petra Dubayová & Matyáš Adamec	Cha-cha-cha	4	4	6	5	19	5th	"Get the Party Started" - Shirley Bassey	Bottom four
5	Anna Jakab Rakovská & Jaroslav Ihring	Jive	6	8	7	5	26	3rd	"Runaway Baby" - Bruno Mars	Safe
6	Hana Gregorová & Róbert Pavlík	Rumba	3	3	5	3	14	8th	"Boli sme raz milovaní" - Pavol Habera	Eliminated
7	Jakub Jablonský & Eliška Lenčešová	Cha-cha-cha	8	9	9	8	34	1st	"Smooth Operator" - Sade	Safe
8	Ján Tribula & Natália Glosíková	Tango	4	4	4	4	16	7th	"Slovenské tango" - Richard Müller	Bottom three
9	Juraj Loj & Natália Horváthová	Rumba	7	7	8	6	28	=2nd	"Fields of Gold" - Sting	Safe

=== Week 5 (31 March) ===
- Theme: Easter/Folklore
- Guest judge: Ján Koleník
- Opening performance: Šarišan folk group (Polka) vs. professional dancers (Tango)
- Guest performance: Šarišan
- This week featured team battle in folk dances. The couples were divided into 3 teams. This battle was not scored by the judges.

Team 1: Petra & Matyáš + Anna & Jaroslav (Trenčín folk dance)

Team 2: Juraj L. & Natália + Juraj B. & Patrícia + Martin & Julie (Zvolen folk dance)

Team 3: Ján T. & Natália + Tina & Vilém + Jakub & Eliška (Gypsy folk dance)

Order	Couple	Dance	Judges' scores				Total	Judges' scoreboard	Music	Result
Order	Couple	Dance	Koleník	Drexler	Vinczeová	Ďurovčík	Total	Judges' scoreboard	Music	Result
1	Juraj Loj & Natália Horváthová	Viennese Waltz	7	5	7	6	25	6th	"Next to Me" - Imagine Dragons	Bottom two
2	Martin Novák & Julie Rezková	Quickstep	5	4	5	4	18	=7th	"It Don' Mean a Thing" - Duke Ellington	Bottom three
3	Petra Dubayová & Matyáš Adamec	Waltz	8	7	8	7	30	3rd	"Hier encore" - Charles Aznavour	Bottom four
4	Anna Jakab Rakovská & Jaroslav Ihring	Slowfox	8	7	8	6	29	4th	"I Wanna Be Loved by You" - Marilyn Monroe	Safe
5	Ján Tribula & Natália Glosíková	Jive	6	4	5	3	18	=7th	"Tutti Frutti" - Little Richard	Safe
6	Juraj Bača & Patrícia Piešťanská	Rumba	7	6	7	6	26	5th	"Father Figure" - George Michael	Eliminated
7	Tina & Vilém Šír	Cha-cha-cha	9	8	8	7	32	2nd	"Lady Marmalade" - Christina Aguilera, Lil' Kim, Mya, P!nk	Safe
8	Jakub Jablonský & Eliška Lenčešová	Viennese Waltz	10	10	9	9	38	1st	"And the Waltz Goes On" - André Rieu	Safe

=== Week 6 (7 April) ===
- Theme: Music icons
- Guest judge: Vladimír Kobielsky
- Opening performance: "Sex Bomb" - Tom Jones/"Hit the Road Jack" - Throttle
- Guest performance: Laura Arcolinova & Massimo Arcolin - Rumba ("Heart-Shaped Box" - Kelbren)
- This week featured the Salsa Dance Marathon.

Order	Couple	Dance	Judges' scores				Total	Music	Salsa Dance Marathon		Final total	Judges' scoreboard	Result
Order	Couple	Dance	Kobielsky	Drexler	Vinczeová	Ďurovčík	Total	Music	Score	Music	Final total	Judges' scoreboard	Result
1	Tina & Vilém Šír	Slowfox	8	8	9	7	32	"I Say a Little Prayer" - Aretha Franklin	3	"Cuba" - Gibson Brothers /"Fireball" - Pitbull ft. John Ryan/"Quimbara" - Celia Cruz ft. Johnny Pacheco	35	3rd	Safe
2	Juraj Loj & Natália Horváthová	Paso doble	10	10	10	9	39	"Smooth Criminal" - Michael Jackson	6	"Cuba" - Gibson Brothers /"Fireball" - Pitbull ft. John Ryan/"Quimbara" - Celia Cruz ft. Johnny Pacheco	45	1st	Safe
3	Martin Novák & Julie Rezková	Rumba	6	4	5	4	19	"Smútok krásnych dievčat" - Karol Duchoň	2	"Cuba" - Gibson Brothers /"Fireball" - Pitbull ft. John Ryan/"Quimbara" - Celia Cruz ft. Johnny Pacheco	21	7th	Eliminated
4	Petra Dubayová & Matyáš Adamec	Rumba	7	5	7	6	25	"Nespáľme to krásne v nás" - Miro Žbirka	5	"Cuba" - Gibson Brothers /"Fireball" - Pitbull ft. John Ryan/"Quimbara" - Celia Cruz ft. Johnny Pacheco	30	5th	Bottom three
5	Anna Jakab Rakovská & Jaroslav Ihring	Cha-cha-cha	10	7	8	7	32	"Kiss" - Prince	4	"Cuba" - Gibson Brothers /"Fireball" - Pitbull ft. John Ryan/"Quimbara" - Celia Cruz ft. Johnny Pacheco	36	2nd	Safe
6	Jakub Jablonský & Eliška Lenčešová	Jive	7	7	7	6	27	"Faith" - Stevie Wonder ft. Ariana Grande	7	"Cuba" - Gibson Brothers /"Fireball" - Pitbull ft. John Ryan/"Quimbara" - Celia Cruz ft. Johnny Pacheco	34	4th	Safe
7	Ján Tribula & Natália Glosíková	Viennese Waltz	7	6	7	5	25	"Somebody to Love" - Queen	1	"Cuba" - Gibson Brothers /"Fireball" - Pitbull ft. John Ryan/"Quimbara" - Celia Cruz ft. Johnny Pacheco	26	6th	Bottom two

=== Week 7 (14 April) ===
- Guest judge: Zuzana Fialová
- The couples each performed two individual dances, the first with their original partners, the second with randomly selected dance partners.

Order	Couple		Dance	Judges' scores				Total	Final total	Music	Judges' scoreboard	Result
Order	Couple		Dance	Fialová	Drexler	Vinczeová	Ďurovčík	Total	Final total	Music	Judges' scoreboard	Result
Order	Celebrity	Dance partner	Dance	Fialová	Drexler	Vinczeová	Ďurovčík	Total	Final total	Music	Judges' scoreboard	Result
1	Anna Jakab Rakovská	Jaroslav Ihring	Viennese Waltz	10	10	10	9	39	69	"La valse d'amelie" - Yann Tiersen	=3rd	Bottom three
7	Anna Jakab Rakovská	Matyáš Adamec	Rumba	8	7	8	7	30	69	"What Was I Made For?" - Billie Eilish	=3rd	Bottom three
2	Tina	Vilém Šír	Paso doble	9	7	9	8	33	69	"Free Your Mind" - En Vogue	=3rd	Bottom two
8	Tina	Jaroslav Ihring	Waltz	9	9	10	8	36	69	"La Vie en rose" - Zaz	=3rd	Bottom two
3	Juraj Loj	Natália Horváthová	Slowfox	10	9	10	8	37	72	"New York, New York" - Frank Sinatra	2nd	Safe
9	Juraj Loj	Natália Glosíková	Cha-cha-cha	10	8	9	8	35	72	"Blurred Lines" - Robin Thicke ft. T.I. & Pharrell Williams	2nd	Safe
4	Ján Tribula	Natália Glosíková	Paso doble	7	6	7	6	26	54	"Diablo rojo" - Rodrigo y Gabriela	5th	Eliminated
10	Ján Tribula	Natália Horváthová	Quickstep	8	7	7	6	28	54	"I'm So Excited" - The Pointer Sisters	5th	Eliminated
5	Petra Dubayová	Matyáš Adamec	Viennese Waltz	9	8	9	8	34	65	"Glimpse of Us" - Joji	4th	Safe
11	Petra Dubayová	Vilém Šír	Jive	8	7	8	8	31	65	"You Can't Stop the Beat" - Hairspray	4th	Safe
6	Jakub Jablonský	Eliška Lenčešová	Tango	10	10	10	10	40	79	"El choclo" - Ángel Villoldo	1st	Safe
12	Jakub Jablonský	Julie Rezková	Rumba	10	10	10	9	39	79	"I See Fire" - Ed Sheeran	1st	Safe

=== Week 8 (21 April) ===
- Guest judge: Adam Bardy
- Opening performance: Amadeus! - The Ballet
- The couples performed two individual dances, the second being contemporary.

Order	Couple	Dance	Judges' scores				Total	Final total	Music	Judges' scoreboard	Result
Order	Couple	Dance	Bardy	Drexler	Vinczeová	Ďurovčík	Total	Final total	Music	Judges' scoreboard	Result
1	Juraj Loj & Natália Horváthová	Jive	8	8	8	8	32	72	"Do You Love Me" - The Contours	2nd	Bottom three
6	Juraj Loj & Natália Horváthová	Contemporary	10	10	10	10	40	72	"Can't Help Falling in Love" - Tommee Profitt feat. brooke [DARK VERSION]	2nd	Bottom three
2	Anna Jakab Rakovská & Jaroslav Ihring	Contemporary	9	8	9	8	34	70	"Heartbeat" - Nneka	3rd	Bottom two
7	Anna Jakab Rakovská & Jaroslav Ihring	Waltz	9	9	9	9	36	70	"Moon River" - Audrey Hepburn	3rd	Bottom two
3	Petra Dubayová & Matyáš Adamec	Paso doble	9	6	8	8	31	68	"Hanuman" - Rodrigo y Gabriela	4th	Safe
8	Petra Dubayová & Matyáš Adamec	Contemporary	10	8	10	9	37	68	"Madness" - Ruelle	4th	Safe
4	Tina & Vilém Šír	Contemporary	8	6	8	6	28	61	"Survivor" - 2WEI	5th	Eliminated
9	Tina & Vilém Šír	Quickstep	9	7	9	8	33	61	"You Can' Hurry Love" - Phil Collins	5th	Eliminated
5	Jakub Jablonský & Eliška Lenčešová	Paso doble	10	10	10	10	40	79	"The Plaza of Execution" - James Horner	1st	Safe
10	Jakub Jablonský & Eliška Lenčešová	Contemporary	10	10	10	9	39	79	"A Palé" - Rosalía	1st	Safe

=== Week 9: Semi-final (28 April) ===
- Guest judge: Helena Vondráčková
- Opening performance: Helena Vondráčková Medley
- For their second dance, being the samba, the couples formed a trio with former celebrity contestants.
- This week featured the dance-off. Two couples with the least overall points went head-to-head and the judges picked the last couple to make it to the final.

Order	Couple	Dance	Judges' scores				Total	Final total	Music	Judges' scoreboard	Result	Dance-off		
Order	Couple	Dance	Vondráčková	Drexler	Vinczeová	Ďurovčík	Total	Final total	Music	Judges' scoreboard	Result	Dance	Music	Result
1	Jakub Jablonský & Eliška Lenčešová	Waltz	10	9	10	9	38	78	"Nocturne - (Slow Waltz / 29 Bpm)" - Ballroom Orchestra and Singers	1st	Safe	N/A		
8	Jakub Jablonský & Eliška Lenčešová	Samba (w/ Ján Koleník)	10	10	10	10	40	78	"Chillando Goma" - Fulanito	1st	Safe	N/A		
2	Petra Dubayová & Matyáš Adamec	Samba (w/ Gabriela Marcinková)	9	8	9	8	34	69	"Conga" - Gloria Estefan	4th	Bottom two	Cha-Cha-Cha	"I Got You (I Feel Good)"-James Brown	Eliminated
5	Petra Dubayová & Matyáš Adamec	Quickstep	9	8	9	9	35	69	"Cheri, Cheri Lady" - Modern Talking	4th	Bottom two	Cha-Cha-Cha	"I Got You (I Feel Good)"-James Brown	Eliminated
3	Anna Jakab Rakovská & Jaroslav Ihring	Paso doble	9	8	9	8	34	72	"Malagueña" - Connie Francis	3rd	Bottom two	Cha-Cha-Cha	"I Got You (I Feel Good)"-James Brown	Advanced to final
6	Anna Jakab Rakovská & Jaroslav Ihring	Samba (w/ Jana Kovalčiková)	10	9	10	9	38	72	"La Vida Es un Carnaval" - La Sonora Santanera ft. Yuri	3rd	Bottom two	Cha-Cha-Cha	"I Got You (I Feel Good)"-James Brown	Advanced to final
4	Juraj Loj & Natália Horváthová	Samba (w/ Vratko Sirági)	10	9	9	8	36	76	"Magalenha" - Sérgio Mendes	2nd	Safe	N/A		
7	Juraj Loj & Natália Horváthová	Tango	10	10	10	10	40	76	"Libertango" - Astor Piazzolla	2nd	Safe	N/A		

=== Final (5 May) ===
- Guest judge: Jana Kovalčiková
- Opening performance: Class of 2024; "Joy" - Pharrell Williams ft. Voices of Fire/"Came Here For Love" - Sigala ft. Ella Eyre
- The couples performed 3 individual dances consisting of an Argentine Tango, one previously performed dance and a showdance.
- As a part of Jakub & Eliška's showdance, Lúčnica folk group performed together with the couple.
- As a part of Juraj & Natália's showdance, Dansovia dance company and Richard Autner performed together with the couple.

Order	Couple	Dance	Judges' scores				Total	Final total	Music	Judges' scoreboard	Result
Order	Couple	Dance	Kovalčiková	Drexler	Vinczeová	Ďurovčík	Total	Final total	Music	Judges' scoreboard	Result
1	Juraj Loj & Natália Horváthová	Cha-cha-cha (Week 2)	10	10	10	10	40	118	"Welcome to the Jungle" - Guns N' Roses	=2nd	Runners-up
4	Juraj Loj & Natália Horváthová	Argentine Tango	10	9	10	9	38	118	"Santa Maria" - Gotan Project	=2nd	Runners-up
9	Juraj Loj & Natália Horváthová	Showdance	10	10	10	10	40	118	"Vtáky" - Richard Autner	=2nd	Runners-up
2	Anna Jakab Rakovská & Jaroslav Ihring	Argentine Tango	10	10	10	9	39	119	"Por una cabeza" - Carlos Gardel	1st	3rd place
5	Anna Jakab Rakovská & Jaroslav Ihring	Viennese Waltz (Week 7)	10	10	10	10	40	119	"La valse d'amelie" - Yann Tiersen	1st	3rd place
7	Anna Jakab Rakovská & Jaroslav Ihring	Showdance	10	10	10	10	40	119	"Feel The Love" - Rudimental ft. John Newman	1st	3rd place
3	Jakub Jablonský & Eliška Lenčešová	Quickstep (Week 1)	10	10	10	10	40	118	"Sing, Sing, Sing" - Benny Goodman	=2nd	Winners
6	Jakub Jablonský & Eliška Lenčešová	Argentine Tango	10	9	10	9	38	118	"Tanguera" - Sexteto Mayor	=2nd	Winners
8	Jakub Jablonský & Eliška Lenčešová	Showdance	10	10	10	10	40	118	"Funny Hat Dance" - Lúčnica	=2nd	Winners

== Season 10 - 2025 ==
Season 10 will start airing on March 2, 2025. The first celebrity contestant, actress Zuzana Mauréry, was announced on December 27, 2024. After the departure of Adela Vinczeová and Viktor Vincze, which was announced in autumn 2024, the new hosts, actress, comedian and winner of Season 8 Jana Kovalčíková and actress, comedian and finalist of Season 9, Anna Jakab Rakovská, were announced on December 30, 2024. On January 8, 2025, professional cyclist Peter Sagan was announced as taking part in this season. On January 13, 2025, Czech actress and singer Eva Burešová was announced as taking part in this season. On January 20, 2025, model and TV host Simona Leskovská was announced as taking part in this season. On January 23, 2025, actors Marek Rozkoš, Ráchel Šoltésová and Kristián Baran were announced as taking part in this season. On January 27, 2025, actors Juraj Kemka, Zuzana Porubjaková and reality TV star Adam Šedro were announced as taking part in this season. On January 30, 2025, actor Šimon Jakuš was announced as taking part in this season. On February 1, 2025, actor and former contestant Adam Bardy was announced as a regular judge. Every week, there will be a guest judge, similar to Season 9.

Celebrity	Occupation / Known for	Dance partner	Status
Adam Šedro	Love Island contestant	Jasmin Affašová	Eliminated 1st on March 9, 2025
Simona Leskovská	model, TV host	Vilém Šír	Eliminated 2nd on March 16, 2025
Šimon Jakuš	actor, Special Olympics champion	Patrícia Piešťanská	Eliminated 3rd on March 23, 2025
Zuzana Mauréry	actress	Matej Chren	Eliminated 4th on March 30, 2025
Juraj Kemka	actor and comedian	Natália Glosíková	Eliminated 5th on April 6, 2025
Marek Rozkoš	actor	Natália Horváthová	Eliminated 6th on April 13, 2025
Eva Burešová	Czech actress and singer	Matyáš Adamec	Eliminated 7th on April 20, 2025
Peter Sagan	professional cyclist	Eliška Lenčešová	Eliminated 8th on April 27, 2025
Ráchel Šoltésová	actress	Titus Ablorh	Third place on May 4, 2025
Zuzana Porubjaková	actress	Jaroslav Ihring	Runner-up on May 4, 2025
Kristián Baran	actor	Dominika Rošková	Winner on May 4, 2025

=== Scoring chart ===
Couple	Place	1	2	1+2	3	4	5	6	7	8	9	10	Average
Kristián & Dominika	1	22	30	52	37	34	28	37	35+25=60	32+38=70	37+37=74	40+38=78	33.57
Zuzana P. & Jaroslav	2	29	34	63	35	38	39	39+3=42	39+40=79	39+38=77	40+40=80	40+40=80	37.86
Ráchel & Titus	3	22	24	46	22	25	36	27+2=29	37+34=71	36+34=70	33+35=68	38+37=75	31.43
Peter & Eliška	4	21	26	47	24	22	22	25	22+36=58	26+30=56	30+31=61		26.25
Eva & Matyáš	5	23	31	54	32	26	30	28	36+39=75	36+34=70			31.50
Marek & Natália H.	6	33	34	67	29	28	32	32+1=33	27+38=65				31.63
Juraj & Natália G.	7	18	28	46	21	30	26	21					24.00
Zuzana M. & Matej	8	24	25	49	28	33	25						27.00
Šimon & Patrícia	9	26	23	49	18	19							21.50
Simona & Vilém	10	15	16	31	15								15.33
Adam & Jasmin	11	13	14	27									13.50

=== Week 1 (2 March) ===
- Guest judge: Paula Abdul
- Opening performance: Break My Soul/Cuff It - Beyoncé
- This week did not feature an elimination. The scores were carried over to the next week.

Order	Couple	Dance	Judges' scores				Total	Judges' scoreboard	Music
Order	Couple	Dance	Bardy	Abdul	Drexler	Ďurovčík	Total	Judges' scoreboard	Music
1	Zuzana Porubjaková & Jaroslav Ihring	Samba	7	8	7	7	29	2nd	Sérgio Mendes - Magalenha
2	Kristián Baran & Dominika Rošková	Viennese Waltz	6	7	5	4	22	=6th	JVKE - Golden Hour
3	Juraj Kemka & Natália Glosíková	Cha-cha-cha	5	6	4	3	18	8th	Right Said Fred - I'm Too Sexy
4	Ráchel Šoltésová & Titus Ablorh	Rumba	6	6	6	4	22	=6th	Paula Abdul - Rush Rush
5	Šimon Jakuš & Patrícia Piešťanská	Waltz	8	8	6	4	26	3rd	Burt Bacharach - What The World Needs Now Is Love
6	Simona Leskovská & Vilém Šír	Quickstep	4	6	3	2	15	9th	Rick Astley - Never Gonna Give You Up
7	Eva Burešová & Matyáš Adamec	Cha-cha-cha	7	7	5	4	23	5th	Charli XCX ft. Billie Eilish - Guess
8	Adam Šedro & Jasmin Affašová	Rumba	3	6	3	1	13	10th	Sting - Shape Of My Heart
9	Marek Rozkoš & Natália Horváthová	Quickstep	9	10	7	7	33	1st	Barry Manilow - Dancin' Fool
10	Zuzana Mauréry & Matej Chren	Waltz	7	7	6	4	24	4th	Ginette Reno - Un peu plus haut, Un peu plus loin
11	Peter Sagan & Eliška Lenčešová	Jive	6	7	5	3	21	7th	Elvis Presley - Hound Dog

=== Week 2 (9 March) ===
- Guest judge: Petra Polnišová
- The judges' scores from both weeks were combined with the viewer votes and the couple with the least overall points was eliminated.

Order	Couple	Dance	Judges' scores				Total	Final total	Judges' scoreboard	Music	Result
Order	Couple	Dance	Bardy	Polnišová	Drexler	Ďurovčík	Total	Final total	Judges' scoreboard	Music	Result
1	Zuzana Mauréry & Matej Chren	Jive	7	8	5	5	25	49	=5th	ABBA - Waterloo	Safe
2	Juraj Kemka & Natália Glosíková	Tango	8	8	7	5	28	46	=7th	Percy Faith - Sombra	Safe
3	Ráchel Šoltésová & Titus Ablorh	Quickstep	7	7	6	4	24	46	=7th	Postmodern Jukebox - Wiggle	Safe
4	Šimon Jakuš & Patrícia Piešťanská	Cha-cha-cha	7	8	4	4	23	49	=5th	Elton John, Kiki Dee - Don't Go Breaking My Heart	Safe
5	Zuzana Porubjaková & Jaroslav Ihring	Slowfox	9	10	8	7	34	63	2nd	Michael Bublé - Feeling Good	Safe
6	Kristián Baran & Dominika Rošková	Cha-cha-cha	8	9	7	6	30	52	4th	Justin Timberlake - Señorita	Safe
7	Adam Šedro & Jasmin Affašová	Quickstep	4	5	3	2	14	27	9th	Pharrell Williams - Freedom	Eliminated
8	Eva Burešová & Matyáš Adamec	Viennese Waltz	8	9	8	6	31	54	3rd	Radiohead - Creep	Safe
9	Simona Leskovská & Vilém Šír	Rumba	5	5	3	3	16	31	8th	Robbie Williams - Angels	Safe
10	Peter Sagan & Eliška Lenčešová	Waltz	7	8	6	5	26	47	6th	Nat King Cole - Unforgettable	Safe
11	Marek Rozkoš & Natália Horváthová	Rumba	9	10	8	7	34	67	1st	Tom Odell - Black Friday	Safe

=== Week 3 (16 March) ===
- Theme: Movies
- Guest judge: Gabriela Marcinková
- Guest performance: Slovak Theatre of Dance - Zvonár u Matky Božej

Order	Couple	Dance	Judges' scores				Total	Judges' scoreboard	Music	Result
Order	Couple	Dance	Bardy	Marcinková	Drexler	Ďurovčík	Total	Judges' scoreboard	Music	Result
1	Juraj Kemka & Natália Glosíková	Rumba	6	7	4	4	21	8th	Forrest Gump Theme from Forrest Gump	Safe
2	Simona Leskovská & Vilém Šír	Viennese Waltz	4	5	3	3	15	10th	Iveta Bartošová - Tři oříšky from Three Wishes for Cinderella	Eliminated
3	Eva Burešová & Matyáš Adamec	Paso doble	8	9	8	7	32	3rd	Robin Carolan - Daybreak/The Third Night from Nosferatu	Safe
4	Šimon Jakuš & Patrícia Piešťanská	Tango	5	6	3	4	18	9th	Roy Orbison - Oh, Pretty Woman from Pretty Woman	Safe
5	Zuzana Porubjaková & Jaroslav Ihring	Cha-cha-cha	9	9	9	8	35	2nd	Fergie - A Little Party Never Killed Nobody (All We Got) from The Great Gatsby	Safe
6	Marek Rozkoš & Natália Horváthová	Viennese Waltz	8	8	7	6	29	4th	The Righteous Brothers - Unchained Melody from Ghost	Safe
7	Zuzana Mauréry & Matej Chren	Rumba	7	9	6	6	28	5th	Barbra Streisand - The Way We Were from The Way We Were	Safe
8	Peter Sagan & Eliška Lenčešová	Cha-cha-cha	6	7	7	4	24	6th	Dua Lipa - Dance the Night from Barbie	Safe
9	Ráchel Šoltésová & Titus Ablorh	Slowfox	6	6	5	5	22	7th	Demi Lovato - Let It Go from Frozen	Safe
10	Kristián Baran & Dominika Rošková	Tango	9	10	10	8	37	1st	John Powell - Assassin's Tango from Mr. & Mrs. Smith	Safe

=== Week 4 (23 March) ===
- Theme: Love
- Guest judge: Zdena Studenková
- Opening performance: Bob Sinclar - Rock This Party (Everybody Dance Now)

Order	Couple	Dance	Judges' scores				Total	Judges' scoreboard	Music	Result
Order	Couple	Dance	Bardy	Studenková	Drexler	Ďurovčík	Total	Judges' scoreboard	Music	Result
1	Eva Burešová & Matyáš Adamec	Waltz	8	5	7	6	26	6th	Lucio Dalla - Caruso	Safe
2	Marek Rozkoš & Natália Horváthová	Cha-cha-cha	7	7	7	7	28	5th	The White Stripes - Seven Nation Army	Safe
3	Zuzana Mauréry & Matej Chren	Viennese Waltz	8	8	9	8	33	3rd	Teddy Swims - Lose Control	Safe
4	Ráchel Šoltésová & Titus Ablorh	Jive	7	6	6	6	25	7th	ROSÉ & Bruno Mars - APT.	Safe
5	Juraj Kemka & Natália Glosíková	Slowfox	8	7	8	7	30	4th	Milan Lasica - List do vetra	Safe
6	Šimon Jakuš & Patrícia Piešťanská	Paso doble	5	5	5	4	19	9th	Pascual Marquina Narro - España cañí	Eliminated
7	Kristián Baran & Dominika Rošková	Rumba	9	8	9	8	34	2nd	Eva Cassidy - Imagine	Safe
8	Peter Sagan & Eliška Lenčešová	Slowfox	6	5	6	5	22	8th	The Temptations - My Girl	Safe
9	Zuzana Porubjaková & Jaroslav Ihring	Quickstep	10	9	10	9	38	1st	Beyoncé - Single Ladies (Put a Ring on It)	Safe

=== Week 5 (30 March) ===
- Guest judge: Nela Pocisková
- Opening performance: MC Kittinho - Ritmação da Putaria/Black Eyed Peas - Pump It featuring Nela Pocisková & Matyáš Adamec

Order	Couple	Dance	Judges' scores				Total	Judges' scoreboard	Music	Result
Order	Couple	Dance	Bardy	Pocisková	Drexler	Ďurovčík	Total	Judges' scoreboard	Music	Result
1	Marek Rozkoš & Natália Horváthová	Tango	8	8	8	8	32	3rd	Otros Aires - Sin rumbo	Safe
2	Eva Burešová & Matyáš Adamec	Samba	8	8	7	7	30	4th	Bad Bunny - NUEVAYoL	Safe
3	Zuzana Porubjaková & Jaroslav Ihring	Rumba	10	10	10	9	39	1st	Grace Carter - Wicked Game	Safe
4	Juraj Kemka & Natália Glosíková	Jive	7	7	6	6	26	6th	Elvis Presley - Jailhouse Rock	Safe
5	Ráchel Šoltésová & Titus Ablorh	Waltz	10	9	9	8	36	2nd	Sia - My Love	Safe
6	Peter Sagan & Eliška Lenčešová	Samba	6	6	5	5	22	8th	Reel 2 Real - I Like to Move It	Safe
7	Zuzana Mauréry & Matej Chren	Paso doble	6	7	6	6	25	7th	The Prodigy - Breathe	Eliminated
8	Kristián Baran & Dominika Rošková	Slowfox	7	8	7	6	28	5th	Postmodern Jukebox - Oops!... I Did It Again	Safe

=== Week 6 (6 April) ===
- Theme: Retro
- Guest judge: Dara Rolins
- Opening performance: Dara Rolins - Čo o mne vieš/Sľub
- This week featured the Viennese Waltz dance marathon. The best 3 couples were awarded additional scores from the judges.

Order	Couple	Dance	Judges' scores				Total	Music	Viennese Waltz marathon		Final total	Judges' scoreboard	Result
Order	Couple	Dance	Bardy	Rolins	Drexler	Ďurovčík	Total	Music	Music	Score	Final total	Judges' scoreboard	Result
1	Ráchel Šoltésová & Titus Ablorh	Cha-cha-cha	7	6	7	7	27	Irene Cara - Flashdance... What a Feeling	Sherman Brothers - Chim Chim Cher-ee	2	29	4th	Safe
2	Juraj Kemka & Natália Glosíková	Quickstep	6	5	5	5	21	Karel Gott - Bum Bum Bum	Sherman Brothers - Chim Chim Cher-ee	-	21	7th	Eliminated
3	Kristián Baran & Dominika Rošková	Samba	9	10	9	9	37	Enrique Iglesias - Bailamos	Sherman Brothers - Chim Chim Cher-ee	-	37	2nd	Safe
4	Eva Burešová & Matyáš Adamec	Tango	8	7	6	7	28	Blur - Song 2	Sherman Brothers - Chim Chim Cher-ee	-	28	5th	Safe
5	Peter Sagan & Eliška Lenčešová	Quickstep	6	9	5	5	25	John Travolta & Olivia Newton-John - You're the One That I Want	Sherman Brothers - Chim Chim Cher-ee	-	25	6th	Safe
6	Marek Rozkoš & Natália Horváthová	Jive	8	8	8	8	32	Elton John - I'm Still Standing	Sherman Brothers - Chim Chim Cher-ee	1	33	3rd	Safe
7	Zuzana Porubjaková & Jaroslav Ihring	Waltz	10	10	10	9	39	Aretha Franklin - (You Make Me Feel Like) A Natural Woman	Sherman Brothers - Chim Chim Cher-ee	3	42	1st	Safe

=== Week 7 (13 April) ===
- Guest judge: Juraj Loj
- The remaining couples each performed two individual dances. The first performance, being their lowest scoring dance with randomly selected dance partners, the second performance being contemporary.

Order	Couple		Dance	Judges' scores				Total	Final total	Music	Judges' scoreboard	Result
Order	Celebrity	Dance partner	Dance	Bardy	Loj	Drexler	Ďurovčík	Total	Final total	Music	Judges' scoreboard	Result
1	Peter Sagan	Dominika Rošková	Jive	6	6	5	5	22	58	Las Ketchup - The Ketchup Song (Aserejé)	6th	Safe
7	Peter Sagan	Eliška Lenčešová	Contemporary	9	9	10	8	36	58	2WEI - Insomnia	6th	Safe
2	Ráchel Šoltésová	Titus Ablorh	Contemporary	10	9	10	8	37	71	Kimbra - Settle Down	3rd	Safe
8	Ráchel Šoltésová	Jaroslav Ihring	Slowfox	9	9	8	8	34	71	Amy Winehouse - Back to Black	3rd	Safe
3	Zuzana Porubjaková	Matyáš Adamec	Samba	10	10	10	9	39	79	Major Lazer & J Balvin feat. El Alfa - Que Calor	1st	Safe
12	Zuzana Porubjaková	Jaroslav Ihring	Contemporary	10	10	10	10	40	79	Sara Bareilles - Gravity	1st	Safe
4	Kristián Baran	Dominika Rošková	Contemporary	9	9	9	8	35	60	Forts, Tiffany Aris, 2WEI - Still Here	5th	Safe
11	Kristián Baran	Natália Horváthová	Viennese Waltz	6	7	6	6	25	60	Lady Gaga & Bruno Mars - Die With A Smile	5th	Safe
5	Marek Rozkoš	Eliška Lenčešová	Cha-cha-cha	7	6	7	7	27	65	Earth, Wind & Fire - Boogie Wonderland	4th	Eliminated
9	Marek Rozkoš	Natália Horváthová	Contemporary	10	10	9	9	38	65	Tananai - Tango	4th	Eliminated
6	Eva Burešová	Titus Ablorh	Cha-cha-cha	9	10	9	8	36	75	Pete Rodriguez - I Like It Like That	2nd	Safe
10	Eva Burešová	Matyáš Adamec	Contemporary	10	10	10	9	39	75	Yeafteryeezyy - Mi Amigo	2nd	Safe

=== Week 8 (20 April) ===
- Theme: Easter/Folklore
- Guest judge: Jakub Jablonský
- Guest performance: SĽUK & Jakub Jablonský
- The remaining couples performed two dances each, the second being traditional folklore dance.

Order	Couple	Dance	Judges' scores				Total	Final total	Music	Judges' scoreboard	Result
Order	Couple	Dance	Bardy	Jablonský	Drexler	Ďurovčík	Total	Final total	Music	Judges' scoreboard	Result
1	Zuzana Porubjaková & Jaroslav Ihring	Jive	10	10	10	9	39	77	Tina Turner - Proud Mary	1st	Safe
6	Zuzana Porubjaková & Jaroslav Ihring	Folklore	10	9	10	9	38	77	Raslavice Poľka	1st	Safe
2	Peter Sagan & Eliška Lenčešová	Paso doble	7	7	6	6	26	56	John Barry - The James Bond Theme	3rd	Safe
7	Peter Sagan & Eliška Lenčešová	Folklore	8	8	7	7	30	56	Terchová Starosvetský dance	3rd	Safe
3	Eva Burešová & Matyáš Adamec	Slowfox	10	9	9	8	36	70	Cigarettes After Sex - Apocalypse	=2nd	Eliminated
8	Eva Burešová & Matyáš Adamec	Folklore	9	9	8	8	34	70	Kúty Vrcená dance	=2nd	Eliminated
4	Ráchel Šoltésová & Titus Ablorh	Paso doble	9	10	9	8	36	70	Georges Bizet - Habanera	=2nd	Safe
9	Ráchel Šoltésová & Titus Ablorh	Folklore	10	8	8	8	34	70	Goral dance	=2nd	Safe
5	Kristián Baran & Dominika Rošková	Quickstep	8	9	7	8	32	70	Rihanna - Pon de Replay	=2nd	Safe
10	Kristián Baran & Dominika Rošková	Folklore	10	9	10	9	38	70	Abov Verbunk dance	=2nd	Safe

=== Week 9: Semi-final (27 April) ===
- Guest judge: Leoš Mareš
- Opening performance: André Rieu - Voilà (Jozef Bednárik Tribute)
- Guest performance: Laura & Massimo Arcolin (Cha-cha-cha)
- For their second dance, the couples formed a trio with a former celebrity contestant.
- This week featured the dance-off. Two couples with the least overall points went head-to-head and the judges picked the last couple to make it to the final.
- This episode marked the 100th episode anniversary.

Order	Couple	Dance	Judges' scores				Total	Final total	Music	Judges' scoreboard	Result
Order	Couple	Dance	Bardy	Mareš	Drexler	Ďurovčík	Total	Final total	Music	Judges' scoreboard	Result
1	Ráchel Šoltésová & Titus Ablorh	Tango	9	8	8	8	33	68	Gotan Project - Santa Maria	3rd	Bottom two
6	Ráchel Šoltésová & Titus Ablorh	Samba (w/ Jana Kovalčiková)	10	9	8	8	35	68	The Ballroom Dance Orchestra - Moliendo Café	3rd	Bottom two
2	Kristián Baran & Dominika Rošková	Jive (w/ Jakub Jablonský)	9	9	9	10	37	74	Peggy Lee - Fever	2nd	Safe
5	Kristián Baran & Dominika Rošková	Waltz	10	9	9	9	37	74	Ludwig van Beethoven - Piano Sonata No. 14	2nd	Safe
3	Zuzana Porubjaková & Jaroslav Ihring	Viennese Waltz	10	10	10	10	40	80	Alexandra Burke - Hallelujah	1st	Safe
8	Zuzana Porubjaková & Jaroslav Ihring	Paso doble (w/ Juraj Loj)	10	10	10	10	40	80	Edvard Grieg - In the Hall of the Mountain King	1st	Safe
4	Peter Sagan & Eliška Lenčešová	Tango (w/ Anna Jakab Rakovská)	8	8	7	7	30	61	Orquesta Del Plata - Montserrat	4th	Eliminated
7	Peter Sagan & Eliška Lenčešová	Rumba	7	10	7	7	31	61	Imagine Dragons - Demons	4th	Eliminated

Dance-off
Couple	Dance	Music	Result
Ráchel Šoltésová & Titus Ablorh	Cha-cha-cha	Kool & The Gang - Celebration	Advanced
Peter Sagan & Eliška Lenčešová	Cha-cha-cha	Kool & The Gang - Celebration	Eliminated

=== Final (4 May) ===
- Guest judge: Ján Koleník
- Opening performance: Jo Blankenburg - Two To Tango
- Guest performance: League of Legends - Warriors (Paso doble w/ Tatiana Drexler, Ján Koleník, Vratko Sirági, Matyáš Adamec, Jakub Jablonský & Fabio Belluci)
- The couples performed 3 individual dances consisting of an unlearned dance, one previously performed dance and a showdance. Showdance was not scored by the judges.
- The judges' scores were for guidance only. The winner was based only on viewer votes.

Order	Couple	Dance	Judges' scores				Total	Final total	Music	Judges' scoreboard	Result
Order	Couple	Dance	Bardy	Koleník	Drexler	Ďurovčík	Total	Final total	Music	Judges' scoreboard	Result
1	Kristián Baran & Dominika Rošková	Paso doble	10	10	10	10	40	78	2WEI - Toxic	2nd	Winner
4	Kristián Baran & Dominika Rošková	Cha-cha-cha (Week 2)	10	10	9	9	38	78	Justin Timberlake - Señorita	2nd	Winner
7	Kristián Baran & Dominika Rošková	Showdance	N/A	N/A	N/A	N/A	N/A	78	Beegie Adair - Fascination Waltz / Mark Ronson ft. Ghostface Killah, Nate Dogg, Trife & Saigon - Ooh Wee	2nd	Winner
2	Zuzana Porubjaková & Jaroslav Ihring	Samba (Week 1)	10	10	10	10	40	80	Sérgio Mendes - Magalenha	1st	Runner-up
5	Zuzana Porubjaková & Jaroslav Ihring	Tango	10	10	10	10	40	80	Machiko Ozawa - La cumparsita	1st	Runner-up
9	Zuzana Porubjaková & Jaroslav Ihring	Showdance	N/A	N/A	N/A	N/A	N/A	80	Daniel Caesar ft. H.E.R. - Best Part	1st	Runner-up
3	Ráchel Šoltésová & Titus Ablorh	Viennese Waltz	10	10	9	9	38	75	Benson Boone - Beautiful Things	3rd	Third place
6	Ráchel Šoltésová & Titus Ablorh	Jive (Week 4)	10	9	9	9	37	75	ROSÉ & Bruno Mars - APT.	3rd	Third place
8	Ráchel Šoltésová & Titus Ablorh	Showdance	N/A	N/A	N/A	N/A	N/A	75	Coldplay - Fix You	3rd	Third place

== Season 11 All-Stars - 2026 ==
Season 11 will start airing on March 8, 2026. The eleventh season was announced as an All-Stars edition and will see the return of 10 former contestants. The first celebrities for whom a return on December 11, 2025 was confirmed were three former winners Ján Koleník, Nela Pocisková and Jakub Jablonský. On January 3, 2026 former winner of Season 3, Juraj Mokrý was confirmed as part of cast. On January 23, 2026 former winner of Season 10, Kristián Baran, former finalist of Season 8, Gabriela Marcinková and former winner of Season 6, Vladimír Kobielsky were confirmed as part of cast. On January 30, 2026, former finalist of Season 10, Zuzana Porubjaková, former winner of Season 5, Jana Hospodárová and former finalist of Season 3, Petra Polnišová were confirmed as part of cast, therefore completing the line-up.

The ten couples featuring selected celebrities and their dancing partners:

Celebrity	Occupation / Known for	Original season and placement	Dance partner	Status
Jana Hospodárová	TV host	Season 5 Winner	Fabio Bellucci	Eliminated 1st on March 15, 2026
Vladimír Kobielsky	Actor	Season 6 Winner	Natália Horváthová	Eliminated 2nd on March 22, 2026
Petra Polnišová	Actress, comedian	Season 3 Runner-up	Vilém Šír	Eliminated 3rd on March 29, 2026
Juraj Mokrý	Comedian, actor	Season 3 Winner	Natália Glosíková	Eliminated 4th on April 5, 2026
Nela Pocisková	Singer, actress	Season 4 Winner	Filip Kucman	Eliminated 5th on April 19, 2026
Gabriela Marcinková	Actress	Season 8 Runner-up	Jaroslav Ihring	Eliminated 6th on April 26, 2026
Jakub Jablonský	Actor	Season 9 Winner	Anna Riebauerová	Eliminated 7th on May 3, 2026
Kristián Baran	Actor	Season 10; Winner	Eliška Betáková	Third place on May 10, 2026
Ján Koleník	Actor	Season 7 Winner	Dominika Rošková	Runner-up on May 10, 2026
Zuzana Porubjaková	Actress	Season 10; Runner-up	Matyáš Adamec	Winner on May 10, 2026

=== Scoring chart ===
Couple	Place	1	2	1+2	3	4	5	6	7	6+7	8	9	10	Average
Zuzana & Matyáš	1	35	27	62	34	35	35	38	38+33=71	109	39+39=78	39+40=79	38+40=78	36.43
Ján & Dominika	2	34	32	66	35	36	37	38	38+38=76	114	39+34=73	38+40=78	40+38=78	36.93
Kristián & Eliška	3	24	30	54	29	37	31	35	31+37=68	103	36+38=74	38+38=76	40+38=78	34.43
Jakub & Anna	4	28	35	63	30	29	38	37	34+32=66	103	37+37=74	38+40=78		34.58
Gabriela & Jaroslav	5	24	33	57	36	30	29	37	35+37=72	109	33+37=70			33.10
Nela & Filip	6	34	31	65	28	32	33	37	30+31=61	98				32.00
Juraj & Natália G.	7	27	19	46	22	23	23							22.80
Petra & Vilém	8	24	23	47	26	27								25.00
Vladimír & Natália H.	9	24	25	49	27									25.33
Jana & Fabio	10	30	22	52										26.00

=== Week 1 (8 March) ===
- This week did not feature an elimination. The scores were carried over to the next week.

Order	Couple	Dance	Judges' scores				Total	Judges' scoreboard	Music
Order	Couple	Dance	Genzer	Drexler	Arcolinová	Ďurovčík	Total	Judges' scoreboard	Music
1	Jakub Jablonský & Anna Riebauerová	Samba	8	6	7	7	28	4th	Kaoma - Banta
2	Nela Pocisková & Filip Kucman	Waltz	8	9	9	8	34	=2nd	Hans Zimmer - Honor Him (Gladiator)
3	Zuzana Porubjaková & Matyáš Adamec	Jive	9	9	9	8	35	1st	Louis Prima/Muddy Waters - Mash-Up
4	Vladimír Kobielsky & Natália Horváthová	Viennese Waltz	6	6	6	6	24	=6th	Richard Müller - Cigaretka na 2 tahy
5	Jana Hospodárová & Fabio Bellucci	Tango	7	8	8	7	30	3rd	Andrew Lloyd Webber - The Phantom of the Opera
6	Petra Polnišová & Vilém Šír	Cha-cha-cha	8	5	5	6	24	=6th	RAYE - Where Is My Husband!
7	Kristián Baran & Eliška Betáková	Paso doble	7	5	5	7	24	=6th	Pascual Marquina Narro - España cañí
8	Juraj Mokrý & Natália Glosíková	Viennese Waltz	8	7	6	6	27	5th	Whitney Houston - I Have Nothing
9	Gabriela Marcinková & Jaroslav Ihring	Rumba	7	5	6	6	24	=6th	Desireless-Voyage voyage
10	Ján Koleník & Dominika Rošková	Samba	9	9	8	8	34	=2nd	mikeeysmind, Chill77 - Papaoutai - Afro soul

=== Week 2 (15 March) ===
- Guest performance: Ladylicious ft. Jana Kovalčiková (N.E.R.D. - She Wants to Move)
- Couples randomly drew one of the dances at the end of the first live show that had previously been performed by contestants in past seasons. No one was allowed to dance the same dance again, and they must perform an exact copy of someone else's dance.
- Laura Arcolinová could not attend the second live show and was replaced by dancer and former member of the professional dancers, Ivana Gáborík.

Order	Couple	Dance	Judges' scores				Total	Total (Week 1 + Week 2)	Judges' scoreboard	Music	Originally performed by	Result
Order	Couple	Dance	Genzer	Drexler	Gáborík	Ďurovčík	Total	Total (Week 1 + Week 2)	Judges' scoreboard	Music	Originally performed by	Result
1	Gabriela Marcinková & Jaroslav Ihring	Waltz	9	9	8	7	33	57	5th	The Godfather - The Godfather Waltz	Vladimír Kobielsky & Dominika Chrapeková	Safe
2	Zuzana Porubjaková & Matyáš Adamec	Cha-cha-cha	7	6	8	6	27	62	4th	Måneskin - Beggin'	Ján Koleník & Vanda Poláková	Safe
3	Jakub Jablonský & Anna Riebauerová	Rumba	9	9	9	8	35	63	3rd	Grace Carter - Wicked Game	Zuzana Porubjaková & Jaroslav Ihring	Safe
4	Jana Hospodárová & Fabio Bellucci	Quickstep	6	5	6	5	22	52	7th	Royal Crown Revue - Hey Pachuco	Juraj Mokrý & Katarína Štumpfová	Eliminated
5	Petra Polnišová & Vilém Šír	Tango	7	5	6	5	23	47	9th	Ángel Villoldo - El Choclo	Jakub Jablonský & Eliška Betáková	Safe
6	Vladimír Kobielsky & Natália Horváthová	Cha-cha-cha	7	6	6	6	25	49	8th	Joe Cocker - Unchain My Heart	Nela Pocisková & Peter Modrovský	Safe
7	Kristián Baran & Eliška Betáková	Slowfox	8	8	7	7	30	54	6th	Marilyn Monroe - I Wanna Be Loved By You	Jana Hospodárová & Matej Chren	Safe
8	Juraj Mokrý & Natália Glosíková	Cha-cha-cha	5	4	5	5	19	46	10th	Justin Timberlake - Señorita/Madonna - Papa Don't Preach	Kristián Baran & Dominika Rošková	Safe
9	Ján Koleník & Dominika Rošková	Quickstep	9	7	9	7	32	66	1st	Cherry Poppin' Daddies - Dr. Bones	Gabriela Marcinková & Matyáš Adamec	Safe
10	Nela Pocisková & Filip Kucman	Tango	8	8	8	7	31	65	2nd	Cirque du Soleil - Mirko	Petra Polnišová & Tomáš Surovec	Safe

=== Week 3 (22 March) ===
- Opening performance: Guns N' Roses - Welcome To The Jungle
- The contestants dedicated their performances to their loved ones.

Order	Couple	Dance	Judges' scores				Total	Judges' scoreboard	Music	Dedicated to	Result
Order	Couple	Dance	Genzer	Drexler	Arcolinová	Ďurovčík	Total	Judges' scoreboard	Music	Dedicated to	Result
1	Jakub Jablonský & Anna Riebauerová	Viennese Waltz	8	8	7	7	30	4th	Rihanna - Love on the Brain	Jakub's partner Petra Dubayová	Safe
2	Nela Pocisková & Filip Kucman	Cha-cha-cha	7	7	7	7	28	6th	Nela Pocisková ft. Tina - Naše telá	Nela's children and partner Filip Tůma	Safe
3	Kristián Baran & Eliška Betáková	Cha-cha-cha	7	7	8	7	29	5th	Orishas ft. Heather Headley - Represent Cuba	acting teacher Peter Šimun	Safe
4	Petra Polnišová & Vilém Šír	Waltz	7	6	7	6	26	8th	Lucio Dalla - Caruso	Petra's mother	Safe
5	Gabriela Marcinková & Jaroslav Ihring	Tango	10	9	9	8	36	1st	Indila - Dernière Danse	TV series Pán profesor	Safe
6	Juraj Mokrý & Natália Glosíková	Rumba	6	6	5	5	22	9th	Prince - Purple Rain	friend, saxophonist Matej Klimo	Safe
7	Ján Koleník & Dominika Rošková	Viennese Waltz	8	10	9	8	35	2nd	Joji - Glimpse of Us	disabled girl Natália	Safe
8	Vladimír Kobielsky & Natália Horváthová	Slowfox	7	6	7	7	27	7th	Frank Sinatra - Fly Me To The Moon	Vladimír's children	Eliminated
9	Zuzana Porubjaková & Matyáš Adamec	Slowfox	9	9	8	8	34	3rd	Riccardo Cocciante - Era già tutto previsto	theater and Zuzana's colleagues Zuzana Kubovčíková Šebová, Roman Poláčik, Róbert Jakab and Ján Dobrík	Safe

=== Week 4 (29 March) ===
- The couples were divided into 4 teams, each team mentored by one of the judges.The team dances were not scored by the judges

Order	Couple	Dance	Judges' scores				Total	Judges' scoreboard	Music	Result
Order	Couple	Dance	Genzer	Drexler	Arcolinová	Ďurovčík	Total	Judges' scoreboard	Music	Result
1	Team Laura: Gabriela & Jaroslav + Zuzana & Matyáš	Paso doble	N/A						Beyoncé - Run The World (Girls)	N/A
2	Nela Pocisková & Filip Kucman	Viennese Waltz	8	8	8	8	32	4th	RAYE - Oscar Winning Tears	Safe
3	Ján Koleník & Dominika Rošková	Cha-cha-cha	10	9	9	8	36	2nd	Leslie Odom Jr. - Go Crazy	Safe
4	Team Richard: Petra & Vilém + Juraj & Natália	Hip-hop	N/A						Richard Genzer & UNO - Klo-klo-kan	N/A
5	Jakub Jablonský & Anna Riebauerová	Cha-cha-cha	7	8	7	7	29	6th	Pete Rodriguez - I Like It Like That	Safe
6	Petra Polnišová & Vilém Šír	Samba	7	7	7	6	27	7th	Daddy Yankee - Gasolina	Eliminated
7	Zuzana Porubjaková & Matyáš Adamec	Quickstep	10	9	8	8	35	3rd	Frohlocker - Hipbrass	Safe
8	Team Tatiana: Kristián & Eliška + Jakub & Anna	Paso doble	N/A						Rosalía feat. Björk & Yves Tumor - Berghain	N/A
9	Juraj Mokrý & Natália Glosíková	Tango	6	6	6	5	23	8th	Carlos Gardel - Por una cabeza	Safe
10	Gabriela Marcinková & Jaroslav Ihring	Samba	8	7	8	7	30	5th	Camila Cabello - Don't Go Yet	Safe
11	Kristián Baran & Eliška Betáková	Viennese Waltz	10	10	9	8	37	1st	Věra Špinarová - Jednoho dne se vrátíš	Safe
12	Team Ján: Nela & Filip + Ján & Dominika	Tango	N/A						Moulin Rouge - El Tango De Roxanne	N/A

=== Week 5 (5 April) ===
- Opening performance: Prvosienka
- Guest performance: SĽUK
- Each couple performed one unlearned dance and a folk dance. For their folk dance, the couples were divided into two teams. The folk dances were not scored by the judges.
- Due to prior commitments, Laura Arcolinová could not attend this week's show. Instead, former judge Dagmar Hubová stepped in for Laura, filling her place.

Order	Couple	Dance	Judges' scores				Total	Judges' scoreboard	Music	Result
Order	Couple	Dance	Genzer	Drexler	Hubová	Ďurovčík	Total	Judges' scoreboard	Music	Result
1	Juraj Mokrý & Natália Glosíková	Jive	6	6	6	5	23	7th	Elvis Presley - Blue Suede Shoes	Eliminated
2	Gabriela Marcinková & Jaroslav Ihring	Slowfox	7	7	8	7	29	6th	Postmodern Jukebox - Drunk In Love	Safe
3	Kristián Baran & Eliška Betáková	Samba	8	7	9	7	31	5th	SNX - Dimensions	Safe
4	Team 1: Juraj & Natália + Zuzana & Matyáš + Nela & Filip + Jakub & Anna	Folk dance	N/A						Strigôňska zábava	N/A
5	Jakub Jablonský & Anna Riebauerová	Tango	10	10	9	9	38	1st	Demarco Electronic Project - En Orsai	Safe
6	Ján Koleník & Dominika Rošková	Jive	9	10	10	8	37	2nd	Louis Prima - Buona Sera	Safe
7	Nela Pocisková & Filip Kucman	Paso doble	8	9	8	8	33	4th	Woodkid - Run Boy Run	Safe
8	Zuzana Porubjaková & Matyáš Adamec	Rumba	9	8	10	8	35	3rd	Ara Malikian - Melalcoholia	Safe
9	Team 2: Gabriela & Jaroslav + Ján & Dominika + Kristián & Eliška	Folk dance	N/A						Strigôňska zábava	N/A

=== Week 6 (12 April) ===
- Opening performance: Jiří Korn - Žál se odkládá
- Guest performance: A$AP Rocky ft. Doechii - ROBBERY
- This week marked a special charity week. Each couple dedicated their performance to their chosen charity.
- This week did not feature an elimination, votes were carried over to the following week.
- The celebrities were paired up with notable contestants from previous seasons.
- The couples performed disco team dances. These dances were not scored by the judges.
- Due to prior commitments, Laura Arcolinová was replaced by actress and former contestant, host and judge Zuzana Fialová.

Order	Couple	Dance	Judges' scores				Total	Judges' scoreboard	Music
Order	Couple	Dance	Genzer	Drexler	Fialová	Ďurovčík	Total	Judges' scoreboard	Music
1	Zuzana Porubjaková & Ján Tribula	Waltz/Jive	8	10	10	10	38	=1st	Aretha Franklin - With Pen in Hand/Wilson Pickett - Land of 1000 Dances
2	Nela Pocisková & Filip Tůma	Samba	10	9	9	9	37	=2nd	Pitbull - Fireball
3	Team 2: Zuzana & Matyáš + Jakub & Anna + Ján & Dominika	Disco	N/A						Monrow Herrod - Bend It Over & Buss It Open/Aretha Franklin - Think
4	Gabriela Marcinková & Vratko Sirági	Jive	9	9	10	9	37	=2nd	DJ Fresh ft. Rita Ora - Hot Right Now
5	Jakub Jablonský & Anna Jakab Rakovská	Jive	9	9	10	9	37	=2nd	Beth Hart - Why Don't You Do Right?
6	Kristián Baran & Ráchel Šoltésová	Jive	9	8	10	8	35	3rd	Fatboy Slim - The Rockafeller Skank
7	Ján Koleník & Eva Máziková	Waltz	9	10	10	9	38	=1st	Whitney Houston - I Will Always Love You
8	Team 1: Gabriela & Jaroslav + Nela & Filip + Kristián & Eliška	Disco	N/A						Bee Gees - You Should Be Dancing

=== Week 7 (19 April) ===
- This week featured instant dance challenge. Couples had 60 minutes to prepare a randomly selected dance from the first 4 weeks.

Order	Couple	Dance	Judges' scores				Total	Final total	Judges' scoreboard	Music	Result
Order	Couple	Dance	Genzer	Drexler	Arcolinová	Ďurovčík	Total	Final total	Judges' scoreboard	Music	Result
1	Nela Pocisková & Filip Kucman	Quickstep	8	7	7	8	30	61	6th	Elton John - I'm Still Standing	Eliminated
7	Nela Pocisková & Filip Kucman	Tango	7	8	8	8	31	61	6th	BOND - Libertango	Eliminated
2	Zuzana Porubjaková & Matyáš Adamec	Tango	9	10	10	9	38	71	3rd	Otros Aires - Los vino	Safe
8	Zuzana Porubjaková & Matyáš Adamec	Slowfox	8	8	9	8	33	71	3rd	Gene Kelly - Singin' in the Rain	Safe
3	Jakub Jablonský & Anna Riebauerová	Slowfox	10	8	8	8	34	66	5th	Nick Cave and the Bad Seeds - Red Right Hand	Safe
9	Jakub Jablonský & Anna Riebauerová	Viennese Waltz	8	9	8	7	32	66	5th	Benson Boone - Beautiful Things	Safe
4	Ján Koleník & Dominika Rošková	Tango	10	10	9	9	38	76	1st	Maxime Rodriguez - Vivo Tango	Safe
10	Ján Koleník & Dominika Rošková	Viennese Waltz	9	10	10	9	38	76	1st	Imagine Dragons - Next to Me	Safe
5	Gabriela Marcinková & Jaroslav Ihring	Viennese Waltz	9	9	9	8	35	72	2nd	Jasmine Thompson - Willow	Safe
11	Gabriela Marcinková & Jaroslav Ihring	Slowfox	9	10	9	9	37	72	2nd	Michael Bublé - Fever	Safe
6	Kristián Baran & Eliška Betáková	Waltz	9	8	7	7	31	68	4th	Ludovico Einaudi - Una Mattina	Safe
12	Kristián Baran & Eliška Betáková	Slowfox	9	10	9	9	37	68	4th	Frank Sinatra - New York, New York	Safe

=== Week 8 (26 April) ===
- Opening performance: Igor Stravinsky - The Firebird
- The couples performed one unlearned dance and a contemporary.

Order	Couple	Dance	Judges' scores				Total	Final total	Judges' scoreboard	Music	Result
Order	Couple	Dance	Genzer	Drexler	Arcolinová	Ďurovčík	Total	Final total	Judges' scoreboard	Music	Result
1	Kristián Baran & Eliška Betáková	Contemporary	9	9	9	9	36	74	=2nd	CLANN - The Return	Safe
6	Kristián Baran & Eliška Betáková	Quickstep	10	10	9	9	38	74	=2nd	Gregory Porter - Puttin' On the Ritz	Safe
2	Gabriela Marcinková & Jaroslav Ihring	Quickstep	9	8	8	8	33	70	4th	The Jackson 5 - Blame It on the Boogie	Eliminated
7	Gabriela Marcinková & Jaroslav Ihring	Contemporary	9	10	9	9	37	70	4th	Florence and the Machine - Old Religion	Eliminated
3	Ján Koleník & Dominika Rošková	Contemporary	10	10	9	10	39	73	3rd	Geek Music - Bang Bang (My Baby Shot Me Down)	Safe
8	Ján Koleník & Dominika Rošková	Rumba	9	8	9	8	34	73	3rd	Maria Mena - It Must Have Been Love	Safe
4	Jakub Jablonský & Anna Riebauerová	Paso doble	10	9	9	9	37	74	=2nd	Ernesto Lecuona - Malagueña	Safe
10	Jakub Jablonský & Anna Riebauerová	Contemporary	10	9	9	9	37	74	=2nd	Tommee Profitt feat. Fleurie - Welcome to the Jungle	Safe
5	Zuzana Porubjaková & Matyáš Adamec	Contemporary	10	10	10	9	39	78	1st	Pil C - Apatia	Safe
9	Zuzana Porubjaková & Matyáš Adamec	Samba	10	10	10	9	39	78	1st	Fela Kuti - Let's Start	Safe

=== Week 9: Semi-final (3 May) ===
- Guest performance: 2WEI, Ali Christenhuz & Edda Hayes - What a Wonderful World
- The couples performed one unlearned dance and a charleston.
- This week featured a dance-off. The two celebrities with the least overall points had to dance without their professional partners.

Order	Couple	Dance	Judges' scores				Total	Final total	Judges' scoreboard	Music	Result
Order	Couple	Dance	Genzer	Drexler	Arcolinová	Ďurovčík	Total	Final total	Judges' scoreboard	Music	Result
1	Ján Koleník & Dominika Rošková	Charleston	10	10	9	9	38	78	=2nd	Will.i.am - Bang Bang	Bottom two
5	Ján Koleník & Dominika Rošková	Slowfox	10	10	10	10	40	78	=2nd	Schindler's List - Theme Song	Bottom two
2	Zuzana Porubjaková & Matyáš Adamec	Viennese Waltz	10	10	10	9	39	79	1st	Sara Rikas - Stále som	Safe
6	Zuzana Porubjaková & Matyáš Adamec	Charleston	10	10	10	10	40	79	1st	Benny Goodman - Sing, Sing, Sing (With a Swing)	Safe
3	Jakub Jablonský & Anna Riebauerová	Charleston	10	10	9	9	38	78	=2nd	Bob Wilson & Varsity Rhythm Boys - The Charleston	Bottom two
7	Jakub Jablonský & Anna Riebauerová	Quickstep	10	10	10	10	40	78	=2nd	Lou Bega - Boyfriend	Bottom two
4	Kristián Baran & Eliška Betáková	Rumba	10	10	9	9	38	76	3rd	Charli XCX - Chains of Love	Safe
8	Kristián Baran & Eliška Betáková	Charleston	10	10	9	9	38	76	3rd	Arctic Monkeys - I Bet You Look Good on the Dancefloor	Safe

Dance-off
Celebrity	Dance	Song	Result
Ján Koleník	Freestyle	Sérgio Mendes - Magalenha	Advanced
Jakub Jablonský	Freestyle	Sérgio Mendes - Magalenha	Eliminated

=== Final (10 May) ===
- Opening performance: NF - The Search
- The couples performed one unlearned dance, their lowest-scored dance and a showdance. The couples were given the same music for their showdance. The showdance was not scored by the judges.
- The judges' scores were for guidance only. The winner was decided based only on viewer votes.

Order	Couple	Dance	Judges' scores				Total	Final total	Judges' scoreboard	Music	Result
Order	Couple	Dance	Genzer	Drexler	Arcolinová	Ďurovčík	Total	Final total	Judges' scoreboard	Music	Result
1	Ján Koleník & Dominika Rošková	Paso doble	10	10	10	10	40	78	=1st	Georges Bizet - Habanera	Runners-up
4	Ján Koleník & Dominika Rošková	Quickstep (Week 2)	10	10	9	9	38	78	=1st	Oh1 - Sing, Sing, Sing	Runners-up
7	Ján Koleník & Dominika Rošková	Showdance	N/A					78	=1st	Cloonee, Young M.A & InntRaw - Stephanie	Runners-up
2	Zuzana Porubjaková & Matyáš Adamec	Cha-cha-cha (Week 2)	10	10	9	9	38	78	=1st	Omara Portuondo - ¿Dónde Estabas Tú?	Winners
5	Zuzana Porubjaková & Matyáš Adamec	Showdance	N/A					78	=1st	Cloonee, Young M.A & InntRaw - Stephanie	Winners
8	Zuzana Porubjaková & Matyáš Adamec	Paso doble	10	10	10	10	40	78	=1st	Pascual Marquina Narro - España cañí	Winners
3	Kristián Baran & Eliška Betáková	Tango	10	10	10	10	40	78	=1st	2WEI feat. Marvin Brooks - Pushin' On	Third place
6	Kristián Baran & Eliška Betáková	Paso doble (Week 1)	10	9	10	9	38	78	=1st	Pascual Marquina Narro - España cañí	Third place
9	Kristián Baran & Eliška Betáková	Showdance	N/A					78	=1st	Cloonee, Young M.A & InntRaw - Stephanie	Third place
