= Let's Dance (Slovak TV series) season 3 =

Let's Dance
- Season 3
- Presented by: Martin "Pyco" Rausch; Zuzana Fialová
- Judges: Jozef Bednárik; Tatiana Drexler; Dagmar Hubová; Ján Ďurovčík
- Celebrity winner: Juraj Mokrý
- Professional winner: Katarína Štumpfová
- No. of episodes: 10

Release
- Original network: Markíza
- Original release: 12 April – 14 June 2009

Series chronology
- ← Previous; Season 2 Next → Season 4

Let's Dance aired its third series on Markíza from 12 April 2009 to 14 June 2009. The series was presented by Martin "Pyco" Rausch and Zuzana Fialová. The judging panel consisted of Jozef Bednárik, Tatiana Drexler, Dagmar Hubová and Ján Ďurovčík.

On 14 June 2009, actor and comedian Juraj Mokrý and Katarína Štumpfová were announced as the winners, while actress and comedian Petra Polnišová and Tomáš Surovec finished as the runners-up.

== Format ==
The couples dance each week in a live show. The judges score each performance out of ten. After all the couples have danced they are then ranked according to the judges' scores and given points according to their rank, with the highest ranked couple receiving a number of points equal to the number of couples dancing that week e.g. 7 points where there are seven couples dancing. When there are no tied scores the lowest scored couple will receive one point. However, in the event of a tie where two or more couples obtain the same judges score, the couple below those in the tie will be awarded one point below the points awarded to each of the tied couples. So, for example, if two couples obtain the same rank and obtain 7 points each, the couple immediately below them will be awarded 6 points. When couples are ranked equally by the judges the scoring of all other couples underneath will follow in the same descending order. Should there be any tied scores the lowest scored couple will therefore receive more than one point from the judges scores. The public are also invited to vote for their favourite couples, and the couples are ranked again according to the number of votes they receive, again receiving points; The couple with the most votes receiving the most points. Again in the unlikely event of a tie in the public vote the points are awarded in the same way as the points from the judges score.

The points for judges' score and public vote are then added together, and the two couples with the fewest points are placed in the bottom two. If two couples have equal points, the points from the public vote are given precedence. As with the previous series, the bottom two couples have to perform a dance-off on the results show. Based on that performance alone, each judge then votes on which couple should stay and which couple should leave. For the first time in the show's history, the casting vote was not made solely by the head judge in the dance-off and was instead rotated, with a different judge making the decision each week.

== Couples ==
The ten couples featuring selected celebrities and their dancing partners:

Celebrity	Occupation / Known for	Dance partner	Status
Martin Šmahel	Model	Mirka Kosorínová	Eliminated 1st on April 19, 2009
Marcela Laiferová	Singer	Milan Plačko	Eliminated 2nd on April 26, 2009
Vincent Lukáč	Former ice hockey player	Denisa Halická	Eliminated 3rd on May 3, 2009
Zora Czoborová	Personal trainer	Erik Ňarjaš	Eliminated 4th on May 10, 2009
Filip Tůma	Actor, opera singer	Ivana Surovcová	Eliminated 5th on May 17, 2009
Fedor Flašík	Businessman	Silvia Kadnárová	Eliminated 6th on May 24, 2009
Iveta Bartošová	Czech singer	Matej Chren	Eliminated 7th on May 31, 2009
Adela Banášová	TV host	Peter Modrovský	Eliminated 8th on June 7, 2009
Petra Polnišová	Actress, comedian	Tomáš Surovec	Runner-up on June 14, 2009
Juraj Mokrý	Actor, comedian	Katarína Štumpfová	Winner on June 14, 2009

== Scoring chart ==
The highest score each week is indicated in bold green with a dagger (†), while the lowest score each week is indicated in italicized red with a double-dagger (‡).

Color key:

Winners
Runners-up
Bottom two
Eliminated

Let's Dance (season 3) - Weekly scores
Couple	Pl.	Week										
Couple	Pl.	1	2	1+2	3	4	5	6	7	8	9	10
Juraj & Katarína	1st	13‡	25	38	24	26	28	33	33	31+39=**70**†	37+40=**77**†	39+40+32=**111**†
Petra & Tomáš	2nd	16	21	37	25	23	31	**35**†	37	29+39=68	35+38=73‡	38+38+32=108‡
Adela & Peter	3rd	**23**†	19	42	27	29	**32**†	30	**39**†	33+36=69	40+37=**77**†	
Iveta & Matej	4th	20	19	39	30	26	30	30	34	26+31=57‡		
Fedor & Silvia	5th	14	18	32	21	24	24‡	25‡	25‡			
Filip & Ivana	6th	15	**28**†	43	25	29	28	27				
Zora & Erik	7th	19	**28**†	**47**†	**31**†	**32**†	25					
Vincent & Denisa	8th	13‡	16	29‡	20	19‡						
Marcela & Milan	9th	19	15‡	34	16‡							
Martin & Mirka	10th	15	16	31								

== Weekly scores ==
Unless indicated otherwise, individual judges scores in the charts below are given (in parentheses) in this order from left to right: Jozef Bednárik, Tatiana Drexler, Dagmar Hubová, Ján Ďurovčík.

=== Week 1 ===
Couples performed either the cha-cha-cha or the waltz, and are listed in the order they performed.

Couple	Scores	Dance	Music
Zora & Erik	19 (5,5,5,4)	Waltz	"Unchained Melody" — Todd Duncan
Petra & Tomáš	16 (4,5,4,3)	Cha-cha-cha	"A Deeper Love" — Aretha Franklin
Vincent & Denisa	13 (3,4,4,2)	Waltz	"Earth Song" — Michael Jackson
Juraj & Katarína	13 (4,3,3,3)	Cha-cha-cha	"Billie Jean" — Michael Jackson
Marcela & Milan	19 (5,5,5,4)	Waltz	"Apologize" — OneRepublic
Martin & Mirka	15 (4,4,4,3)	Cha-cha-cha	"Baila morena" — Zucchero
Fedor & Silvia	14 (4,3,4,3)	Waltz	"First Day of My Life" — Melanie C
Filip & Ivana	15 (4,4,4,3)	Cha-cha-cha	"A Namorada" — Carlinhos Brown
Iveta & Matej	20 (6,5,5,4)	Waltz	"Horchat Hai Calyptus" — Shiri Maimon
Adela & Peter	23 (6,6,6,5)	Cha-cha-cha	"Cream" — Prince

=== Week 2 ===
Couples performed either the quickstep or the rumba, and are listed in the order they performed.

Couple	Scores	Dance	Music	Result
Iveta & Matej	19 (5,5,5,4)	Rumba	"Chains" — Tina Arena	Safe
Martin & Mirka	16 (5,4,4,3)	Quickstep	"We Go Together" — Grease	Eliminated
Fedor & Silvia	18 (4,5,5,4)	Rumba	"You're Beautiful" — James Blunt	Safe
Filip & Ivana	28 (7,8,7,6)	Quickstep	"Cirque du Soleil" — Cirque du Soleil	Safe
Vincent & Denisa	16 (4,5,4,3)	Rumba	"No Me Ames" — Jennifer Lopez & Marc Anthony	Safe
Adela & Peter	19 (5,5,5,4)	Quickstep	"You Can't Hurry Love" — Phil Collins	Safe
Marcela & Milan	15 (4,5,3,3)	Rumba	"Amazing" — Seal	Bottom two
Petra & Tomáš	21 (5,5,6,5)	Quickstep	"Diamonds Are a Girl's Best Friend" — Marilyn Monroe	Safe
Zora & Erik	28 (8,8,6,6)	Rumba	"Besame mucho" — Andrea Bocelli	Safe
Juraj & Katarína	25 (6,7,7,5)	Quickstep	"Hey Pachuco" — Royal Crown Revue	Safe

Judges' votes to save

- Bednárik: Marcela & Milan
- Drexler: Marcela & Milan
- Hubová: Marcela & Milan
- Ďurovčík: Did not vote

=== Week 3 ===
Couples performed either the jive or the tango, and are listed in the order they performed.

Couple	Scores	Dance	Music	Result
Marcela & Milan	16 (5,4,4,3)	Tango	"El choclo" — Julio Iglesias	Eliminated
Vincent & Denisa	20 (5,6,5,4)	Tango	"A Woman in Love" — Guys and Dolls	Bottom two
Adela & Peter	27 (7,7,7,6)	Jive	"Yes" — Merry Clayton	Safe
Zora & Erik	31 (8,8,8,7)	Tango	"El Tango de Roxanne" — The Police	Safe
Juraj & Katarína	24 (8,5,6,5)	Jive	"All Shook Up" — Elvis Presley	Safe
Fedor & Silvia	21 (6,5,5,5)	Tango	"Sin Rumbo" — Otros Aires	Safe
Petra & Tomáš	25 (7,7,6,5)	Jive	"Crazy Little Thing Called Love" — Queen	Safe
Iveta & Matej	30 (8,8,7,7)	Tango	"Asi Se Baila El Tango" — Veronica Verdier	Safe
Filip & Ivana	25 (6,7,6,6)	Jive	"The Heat Is On" — Gloria Gaynor	Safe

Judges' votes to save

- Bednárik: Vincent & Denisa
- Drexler: Vincent & Denisa
- Hubová: Vincent & Denisa
- Ďurovčík: Did not vote, but would have voted to save Vincent & Denisa

=== Week 4 ===
Couples performed either the slowfox or the paso doble, and are listed in the order they performed.

Couple	Scores	Dance	Music	Result
Adela & Peter	29 (7,7,8,7)	Slowfox	"My Baby Just Cares for Me" — Nina Simone	Safe
Fedor & Silvia	24 (7,6,6,5)	Paso doble	"Pasodoble Clásico Español"	Safe
Filip & Ivana	29 (7,8,7,7)	Slowfox	"Wade in the Water" — Eva Cassidy	Safe
Iveta & Matej	26 (7,7,6,6)	Paso doble	"Love Theme from The Godfather" — The Godfather	Safe
Petra & Tomáš	23 (6,6,6,5)	Slowfox	"Feeling Good" — Cy Grant	Safe
Vincent & Denisa	19 (5,5,5,4)	Paso doble	"Olé España" — Tanz Orchester Klaus Hallen	Eliminated
Juraj & Katarína	26 (7,6,7,6)	Slowfox	"One" — A Chorus Line	Bottom two
Zora & Erik	32 (9,8,8,7)	Paso doble	"España cañí" — Pascual Marquina	Safe

Judges' votes to save

- Bednárik: Did not vote, but would have voted to save Juraj & Katarína
- Drexler: Juraj & Katarína
- Hubová: Juraj & Katarína
- Ďurovčík: Juraj & Katarína

=== Week 5 ===
Couples performed the samba, and are listed in the order they performed.

Couple	Scores	Dance	Music	Result
Fedor & Silvia	24 (6,6,6,6)	Samba	"Iko Iko" — The Dixie Cups	Safe
Zora & Erik	25 (7,6,6,6)	Samba	"Brazil" — Frank Sinatra	Eliminated
Petra & Tomáš	31 (8,9,7,7)	Samba	"El Matador" — Los Fabulosos Cadillacs	Safe
Juraj & Katarína	28 (8,6,7,7)	Samba	"Dr. Beat" — Miami Sound Machine	Safe
Adela & Peter	32 (8,8,8,8)	Samba	"Magalenha" — Carlinhos Brown	Safe
Filip & Ivana	28 (7,7,7,7)	Samba	"Bate Lata" — Banda Beijo	Bottom two
Iveta & Matej	30 (8,8,7,7)	Samba	"Jazz Machine" — Black Machine	Safe

Judges' votes to save

- Bednárik: Did not vote, but would have voted to save Filip & Ivana
- Drexler: Filip & Ivana
- Hubová: Filip & Ivana
- Ďurovčík: Filip & Ivana

=== Week 6 ===
Each couple performed an unlearned Latin routine, and are listed in the order they performed.

Couple	Scores	Dance	Music	Result
Filip & Ivana	27 (7,7,7,6)	Paso doble	"He's a Pirate" — Klaus Badelt	Eliminated
Iveta & Matej	30 (8,8,7,7)	Jive	"The Boy Does Nothing" — Alesha Dixon	Bottom two
Adela & Peter	30 (8,7,8,7)	Rumba	"Warwick Avenue" — Duffy	Safe
Juraj & Katarína	33 (8,8,9,8)	Paso doble	"España" — Paso Doble / 60 Bpm	Safe
Petra & Tomáš	35 (9,9,9,8)	Rumba	"Fields of Gold" — Sting	Safe
Fedor & Silvia	25 (7,6,6,6)	Cha-cha-cha	"Sway" — Dean Martin	Safe

Judges' votes to save

- Bednárik: Iveta & Matej
- Drexler: Filip & Ivana
- Hubová: Iveta & Matej
- Ďurovčík: Iveta & Matej

=== Week 7 ===
Each couple performed unlearned one Standard routine and a group Viennese waltz, and are listed in the order they performed.

Couple	Scores	Dance	Music	Result
Iveta & Matej Adela & Peter Juraj & Katarína Petra & Tomáš Fedor & Silvia	No scores received	Viennese waltz	"Take This Waltz" — Leonard Cohen	
Juraj & Katarína	33 (8,9,8,8)	Tango	"Por una cabeza" — Andrea Bocelli	Safe
Fedor & Silvia	25 (7,6,6,6)	Slowfox	"You're Nobody till Somebody Loves You" — Russ Morgan	Eliminated
Adela & Peter	39 (10,10,10,9)	Tango	"Santa Maria" — Gotan Project	Safe
Iveta & Matej	34 (9,9,8,8)	Slowfox	"The Pink Panther Theme" — Henry Mancini	Bottom two
Petra & Tomáš	37 (10,10,9,8)	Tango	"Mirko" — Cirque du Soleil	Safe

Judges' votes to save

- Bednárik: Iveta & Matej
- Drexler: Iveta & Matej
- Hubová: Iveta & Matej
- Ďurovčík: Iveta & Matej

=== Week 8 ===
Each couple performed one unlearned Latin routine and the salsa, and are listed in the order they performed.

Couple	Scores	Dance	Music	Result
Petra & Tomáš	29 (8,8,7,6)	Paso doble	"Fuegos" — Paso Doble / 60 Bpm	Safe
Petra & Tomáš	39 (10,10,10,9)	Salsa	"Castigala" — Maracas	Safe
Iveta & Matej	26 (7,7,6,6)	Salsa	"Do You Only Wanna Dance" — Mya	Eliminated
Iveta & Matej	31 (9,8,7,7)	Cha-cha-cha	"Oye Cómo Va" — Tito Puente	Eliminated
Juraj & Katarína	31 (8,8,8,7)	Rumba	"Holding Back the Years" — Simply Red	Safe
Juraj & Katarína	39 (10,10,10,9)	Salsa	"Can't Buy Me Love " — The Beatles	Safe
Adela & Peter	33 (8,8,9,8)	Salsa	"Aguanile" — Héctor Lavoe	Safe
Adela & Peter	36 (9,9,10,8)	Paso doble	"España cañí " — Pascual Marquina Narro	Safe

=== Week 9: Semi-finals ===
Each couple performed a waltz and a redemption cha-cha-cha, and are listed in the order they performed.

Couple	Scores	Dance	Music	Result
Adela & Peter	40 (10,10,10,10)	Waltz	"It Is You (I Have Loved)" — Dana Glover	Eliminated
Adela & Peter	37 (9,9,10,9)	Cha-cha-cha	"I Like It Like That" — Pete Rodriguez	Eliminated
Juraj & Katarína	37 (9,9,10,9)	Waltz	"Come Away with Me" — Norah Jones	Safe
Juraj & Katarína	40 (10,10,10,10)	Cha-cha-cha	"Let's Groove" — Earth, Wind & Fire	Safe
Petra & Tomáš	35 (9,9,9,8)	Waltz	"Nocturne" — Secret Garden	Safe
Petra & Tomáš	38 (10,10,9,9)	Cha-cha-cha	"In These Shoes?" — Kirsty MacColl	Safe

=== Week 10: Finale ===
Each couple performed three routines: Argentine tango, their favorite dance and their freestyle routine. Couples are listed in the order they performed.

Couple	Scores	Dance	Music	Result
Petra & Tomáš	38 (10,10,9,9)	Salsa	"Castigala" — Maracas	Runners-up
Petra & Tomáš	38 (10,9,9,10)	Argentine tango	"Assassin's Tango" — Mr. & Mrs. Smith	Runners-up
Petra & Tomáš	32 (8,8,8,8)	Freestyle	"ABBA medley" — ABBA	Runners-up
Juraj & Katarína	39 (10,10,10,9)	Quickstep	"Hey Pachuco" — Royal Crown Revue	Winners
Juraj & Katarína	40 (10,10,10,10)	Argentine tango	"Tanguera" — Mariano Mores	Winners
Juraj & Katarína	32 (8,8,8,8)	Freestyle	"You're the One That I Want" — Grease	Winners

== Dance chart ==
The couples performed the following each week:

- Week 1: One unlearned dance (cha-cha-cha or waltz)
- Week 2: One unlearned dance (quickstep or rumba)
- Week 3: One unlearned dance (jive or tango)
- Week 4: One unlearned dance (slowfox or paso doble)
- Week 5: Samba
- Week 6: One unlearned Latin dance
- Week 7: One unlearned Standard dance & Viennese waltz group dance
- Week 8: One unlearned Latin dance & salsa
- Week 9: Waltz & redemption cha-cha-cha
- Week 10: Argentine tango, favorite dance and freestyle routine

Let's Dance (season 3) - Dance chart
Couple	Week														
Couple	1	2	3	4	5	6	7		8		9		10		
Juraj & Katarína	Cha-cha-cha	Quickstep	Jive	Slowfox	Samba	Paso doble	Group; Viennese waltz	Tango	Rumba	Salsa	Waltz	Cha-cha-cha	Quickstep	Argentine tango	Freestyle
Petra & Tomáš	Cha-cha-cha	Quickstep	Jive	Slowfox	Samba	Rumba	Group; Viennese waltz	Tango	Paso doble	Salsa	Waltz	Cha-cha-cha	Salsa	Argentine tango	Freestyle
Adela & Peter	Cha-cha-cha	Quickstep	Jive	Slowfox	Samba	Rumba	Group; Viennese waltz	Tango	Salsa	Paso doble	Waltz	Cha-cha-cha			
Iveta & Matej	Waltz	Rumba	Tango	Paso doble	Samba	Jive	Group; Viennese waltz	Slowfox	Salsa	Cha-cha-cha					
Fedor & Silvia	Waltz	Rumba	Tango	Paso doble	Samba	Cha-cha-cha	Group; Viennese waltz	Slowfox							
Filip & Ivana	Cha-cha-cha	Quickstep	Jive	Slowfox	Samba	Paso doble									
Zora & Erik	Waltz	Rumba	Tango	Paso doble	Samba										
Vincent & Denisa	Waltz	Rumba	Tango	Paso doble											
Marcela & Milan	Waltz	Rumba	Tango												
Martin & Mirka	Cha-cha-cha	Quickstep													
