= Andrea Verešová =

Slovak model and beauty pageant titleholder

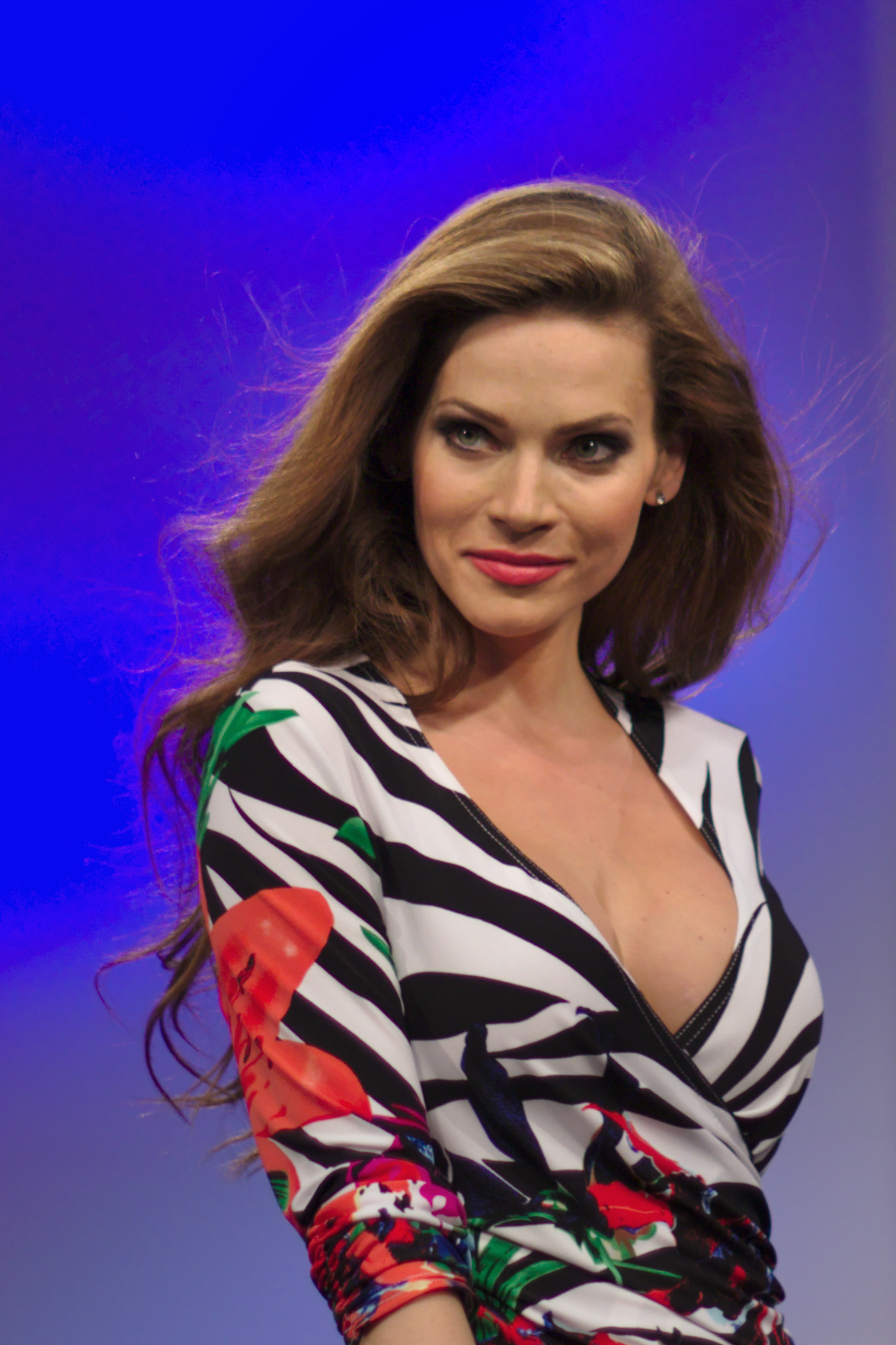
- Born: 28 June 1980 (age 45); Žilina, Czechoslovakia (now Slovakia)
- Occupation: Model
- Spouse: Daniel Volopich (m. 2007)
- Children: 2
- Modeling information
- Height: 1.74 m (5 ft 8 1/2 in)
- Hair color: Light Brown
- Eye color: Green
- Agency: Czechoslovak Models
- Website: andreaveresova.cz

Andrea Verešová (born 28 June 1980) is a Slovak model and beauty pageant titleholder who won Miss Slovakia 1999.

== Biography ==
Andrea Verešová was born on 28 June 1980 in Žilina. She was educated at the local Belgian lycée. Just before graduation, she was crowned Miss Slovakia. After graduating, she enrolled to study law at the Charles University. She graduated with a law degree in 2007 after transferring to the University of West Bohemia.

In 2008, she competed in the Slovak edition of Let's Dance TV show, finishing third.

In May 2010 Verešová appeared on the cover issue of the Czech language edition of Playboy.

== Personal life ==
From 1999 to 2003, Verešová was in a relationship with the ice hockey player Jaroslav Jágr. In 2007, she married the lawyer Daniel Volopich. The pair has two children.
