= Erik Ňarjaš =

Slovak dancer, businessman and politician (born 1985)

Member of the National Council of the Slovak Republic
- In office 21 March 2020 – 30 September 2023

Personal details
- Born: 28 May 1985 (age 41) Košice, Czechoslovakia (now Slovakia)
- Party: OĽaNO (2020–2023)
- Spouse: Alina Ňarjaš
- Children: 1
- Education: University of Warsaw (MBA)
- Profession: Dancer, businessman

Erik Ňarjaš (born 28 May 1985) is a Slovak professional dancer, businessman and former politician. He gained public recognition as a professional dancer on the Slovak television series Let's Dance and later served as a member of the National Council of the Slovak Republic for the movement Ordinary People and Independent Personalities (OĽaNO) from 2020 to 2023. He has also been active in the fintech sector, particularly in payment services.

== Early life and education ==
Ňarjaš was born in May 1985 in Košice. He studied international relations in Slovakia and finance in Hong Kong. He holds an MBA from the University of Warsaw.

== Dancing career ==
Ňarjaš competed as a professional ballroom dancer and achieved notable success, including the title of professional champion of Slovakia and world champion in the Pro-Am category (professional–amateur), particularly in the Viennese waltz with partner Petra Marko.

He became widely known to the Slovak public through multiple seasons of the TV Markíza series Let's Dance:

- Season 1 (2006) – partnered with presenter Marianna Ďurianová (reached the semi-finals)
- Season 3 (2009) – partnered with fitness trainer Zora Czoborová
- Season 4 (2010) – partnered with Czech model and actress Simona Krainová (withdrew)
- Season 6 (2017) – partnered with tennis player Daniela Hantuchová

== Business career ==
After retiring from dancing, Ňarjaš moved into the financial and fintech sectors. His companies provided payment gateway and processing services for e-commerce, operating in various countries. Ňarjaš has also been involved in real estate investment, including properties in Dubai.

== Political career ==
Ňarjaš entered politics with the OĽaNO movement and was elected to the National Council of the Slovak Republic in the 2020 parliamentary election (receiving 5,532 preferential votes). He served as a member of the Committee on Finance and Budget.

In 2022 he was the OĽaNO candidate for the Governor of the Košice Region, finishing fifth with approximately 12,000 votes.

In December 2022 he was appointed (without a public tender) as a member of the board of directors of the state lottery company TIPOS by then-Finance Minister Igor Matovič. He left the position in June 2023.

On 26 June 2023, Ňarjaš announced his departure from the OĽaNO parliamentary group, citing significant differences of opinion with some figures in the movement. He indicated he would focus on commercial activities.

== Personal life ==
In July 2022, Ňarjaš married Alina, a Kyrgyz national and former flight attendant. The couple met in Dubai and held a private wedding ceremony on the Seychelles. Their son Liam was born in 2025. They reside in Bratislava and Dubai.
