= Veronika Husárová =

Slovak lawyer (born 1987)

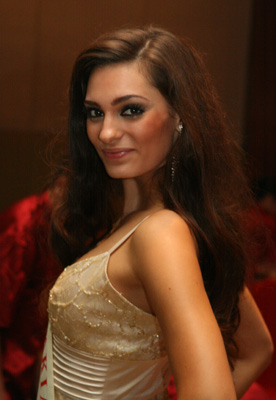
- Veronika during Miss World 2007
- Born: Veronika Husárová; 1987 (age 38–39); Komárno, Czechoslovakia
- Beauty pageant titleholder
- Title: Miss Slovakia 2007

Veronika Husárová (Slovak pronunciation: [ˈɦusaːrɔʋa]) is a Slovak lawyer, dancer and beauty pageant titleholder who won the title of Miss Slovakia 2007 and represented Slovakia at Miss World 2007 in Sanya, China.

In 2008, she appeared as a professional dancer in the Slovak version of Dancing with the Stars.
