= Jaroslav Jágr =

Czech ice hockey player

- Born: February 9, 1984 (age 41)
- Height: 6 ft 1 in (185 cm)
- Weight: 172 lb (78 kg; 12 st 4 lb)
- Position: Goaltender
- Catches: Right
- Czech Extraliga team: HC České Budějovice
- Playing career: 2010–present

Jaroslav Jágr (born February 9, 1984) is a Czech professional ice hockey goaltender. He played with HC České Budějovice in the Czech Extraliga during the 2010–11 Czech Extraliga season.
