= Milan Zimnýkoval =

Slovak television and radio presenter (born 1978)

- Born: Milan Zimnýkoval; 31 January 1978 (age 48); Snina, Czechoslovakia
- Occupations: moderator and presenter
- Years active: 1997–present
- Spouse: Antónia Zimnýkoval
- Children: Alexandra Zimnýkoval

Milan Zimnýkoval (born 31 January 1978), known professionally as "Junior", is a Slovak television and radio presenter. He was born in Snina. He is the son of a soldier and his mother was a primary school teacher. For ten years he has danced in the Slovak folk dance group Zemplín. In June 2012 he married the television producer Antónia Gondová, who took on the married surname Zimnýkoval. They live together in Bratislava and raise their daughter Alexandra.

== Studies ==
After graduating from Pavol Horov Grammar School (Gymnázium Pavla Horova) in Michalovce, he studied History and English at the Faculty of Philosophy at the University of Prešov (Prešovská Univerzita).

== Career ==
Milan Zimnýkoval became famous among people mostly as a radio speaker. He has worked in radios since 1997, when he started at the college radio station PaF (1997–2003). He then moved on to the Prešov radio Flash (1998–2004) and since 2004 he has been working as a presenter for Fun Radio. Working for one of the most popular radio stations, Junior went through different programs. However, as a member of the team Junior and Marcel, he became a favourite with the fans. With their wit and prompt improvisation, the duo also earned the fan favour beyond Slovak borders. In 2009 Milan Zimnýkoval and Marcel Forgáč started presenting the noon show at the radio, and since 2013 they speak to the listeners every morning from 6:00 to 10:00. In 2013 they replaced Oliver Andrásy and Elena Vacvalová in the TV programme Nikto nie je dokonalý (No one is perfect). Together they also presented the last two seasons of the popular talent show Česko Slovensko má talent, which was broadcast simultaneously by TV stations Prima Live and TV JOJ.

== Television career ==
Milan Zimnýkoval debuted as television presenter in the entertainment – social show No Problem, which was broadcast on public television, which earned the award Prix Danube in 2001. As a presenter, he was behind the success of several popular shows. Together with Linda Wagnerová he hosted the show Teleráno on TV Markíza. Along with the actress and TV presenter Kristína Farkašová he starred in the programme Legendy Popu, broadcast by Slovak television from 2011 to 2013. During several years he hosted Miss Universe SR and the award ceremony Športovec Roka (Sportsman of the year). He also starred in shows Čo ja viem and Pomaly ďalej zájdeš. For several years he has been the star host of TV JOJ. Aside from the already mentioned talent show and entertainment show Nikto nie je dokonalý, the show Moja mama varí lepšie (My mom is a better cook) also enjoys high viewer ratings with over 500 episodes broadcast. At the beginning of June 2017 he started recording his own game show HESLO (TV JOJ) and a dating show TAKE ME OUT (TV JOJ and TV Prima) where he teamed up with Jakub Prachař. He is regularly nominated for the OTO award for his work in the category TV program moderator and Telkáč roka. Milan "Junior" Zimnýkoval currently features in as many as four programmes of the FREMANTLE company (Česko Slovensko Má Talent, Take Me Out, Moja Mama Varí Lepšie a Heslo).

== Appearances on television programs ==
- 2021–2026: Pečie celé Slovensko
- 2017: Zem spieva (TV Host)
- 2017: Moja mama varí lepšie ako tvoja (Presenter)
- 2017: Nikto nie je dokonalý (Presenter)
- 2017: Take me out (Presenter)
- 2017: Heslo (Presenter)
- 2017: Všetko, čo mám rád (TV Host)
- 2016: Česko Slovensko má talent (Presenter)
- 2016: Športovec roka 2016 (Presenter)
- 2016: Uhádni môj vek (TV Host)
- 2016: Neskoro večer (TV Host)
- 2016: 90-60-90 program výročia RTVS (TV Host)
- 2015: Česko Slovensko má talent (Presenter)
- 2015: Moja mama varí lepšie ako tvoja (Presenter)
- 2015: Pomaly ďalej zájdeš (TV Host)
- 2014: Čo ja viem (TV Host)
- 2014: Daj si čas (Presenter)
- 2014: Športovec roka (Presenter)
- 2014: Úsmev ako dar 2014 (Presenter)
- 2014: 15 minútový kuchár a hostia (TV Host)
- 2013: Nikto nie je dokonalý (Presenter)
- 2013: Miss Universe SR (Presenter)
- 2012: Miss Universe SR (Presenter)
- 2012: Hotel Paradise – Noc v raji (Presenter)
- 2011: Legendy popu (Presenter)
- 2009: Bez servítky (TV Host)
- 2006: Chart One (Presenter)
