= Mugzy's Move =

1996 album by Royal Crown Revue

Studio album by Royal Crown Revue
- Released: 1996
- Genre: Swing revival
- Label: Warner Bros.
- Producer: Ted Templeman

Royal Crown Revue chronology
Kings of Gangster Bop (1991)	Mugzy's Move (1996)	Caught in the Act (1997)

Mugzy's Move is an album by the American band Royal Crown Revue, released in 1996. The album cover art was inspired by classic pulp fiction.

The album peaked at No. 11 on Billboard's Jazz Albums chart. The band supported Mugzy's Move by touring with the Pretenders.

== Production ==
The album was produced by Ted Templeman, who had also signed Royal Crown Revue. The band recorded it as a septet. The lyrics were inspired by frontman Eddie Nichols's love of mid-20th century crime movies and novels.

"Beyond the Sea" is a cover of the song made famous by Bobby Darin. "Honey Child" is a version of the Willie Dixon song. "Hey Pachuco!", which was met with questions related to cultural appropriation, was first heard on the soundtrack to The Mask. "Datin' with No Dough" is an autobiographical song.

== Critical reception ==
Professional ratings
Review scores
Source	Rating
AllMusic	4/5 stars
The Encyclopedia of Popular Music	3/5 stars
The Florida Times-Union	A−
MusicHound Rock: The Essential Album Guide	3.5/5 stars
Orange County Register	3/5 stars
The Province	3/5 stars

The Province wrote: "A self-conscious collision (or collusion?) of film noir, pulp fiction and big band swing, Royal Crown Revue are Kansas City rhythm and blues out of sync and out of time but enormously entertaining." The Florida Times-Union deemed Mugzy's Move "a great recording with a swinging big band sound that can match the energy of any act today." The Orange County Register concluded that "if there's a flaw, it's that singer Eddie Nichols' voice doesn't have the requisite range and suave soulfulness."

The Honolulu Star-Bulletin called the album "a refreshingly original musical journey through the seedier side of the SoCal scene—retro but contemporary." The Baltimore Sun noted the "energetic, muscular sound, thoroughly grounded in California zoot suit culture." The Advocate opined that "for all its hep cat energy, attitude and chops, Royal Crown Revue's retro-swing-bop comes off like an imitation of an imitation."

AllMusic wrote: "Although the band is energetic and proficient, their cutesey originals and campy album art give their music an aura of being some sort of kitschy joke."

== Track listing ==
No.	Title	Length
1.	"Hey Pachuco!"
2.	"Zip Gun Pop"
3.	"Mugzy's Move"
4.	"I Love the Life I Live"
5.	"The Walkin' Blues"
6.	"Beyond the Sea"
7.	"Park's Place"
8.	"Datin' with No Dough"
9.	"Trouble in Tinsel Town"
10.	"Topsy"
11.	"The Rise and Fall of the Great Mondello"
12.	"Honey Child"
13.	"Hey Pachuco! (Reprise)"
14.	"Barflies at the Beach"
