= Pascual Marquina =

- Birth name: Pascual Marquina Narro
- Born: 16 May 1873; Calatayud, Spanish Republic
- Died: 13 July 1948 (aged 75); Madrid, Francoist Spain
- Occupation: Composer

Pascual Marquina Narro (16 May 1873 – 13 July 1948) was a prolific Spanish orchestral and operatic composer, known particularly for his pasodoble works, such as España cañí.
