= España cañí =

Spanish traditional song

"España cañí" (meaning "Gypsy Spain" in Spanish) is a famous instrumental Spanish piece of pasodoble music by Pascual Marquina Narro (1873–1948). The song was written around 1923 and first recorded in 1926. In English it is also known as the Spanish Gypsy Dance.

Its main refrain (eight bars of arpeggiated chords that go from E major to F major (with added 4 instead of 5) to G major and back) is arguably the best known snippet of Spanish music and is popular worldwide. It is commonly played by organists at baseball games.

Several arrangements of the tune are often used for the Latin pasodoble dance (to the point that, among Latin dancers, it is known as "the pasodoble song" as it is very commonly played in competition due to the common custom for the choreography to match the phrasing and accents of the music for the full effect of the dance). It is also a chant played and voiced by the supporters of Eskişehirspor of Turkey. The song has also been used as the theme song for Pablo Sanchez in the Backyard Sports franchise and the intro in the Greek TV Series Κωνσταντίνου και Ελένης (Konstantinou kai Elenis).
