= Natalio Cirilo Banegas =

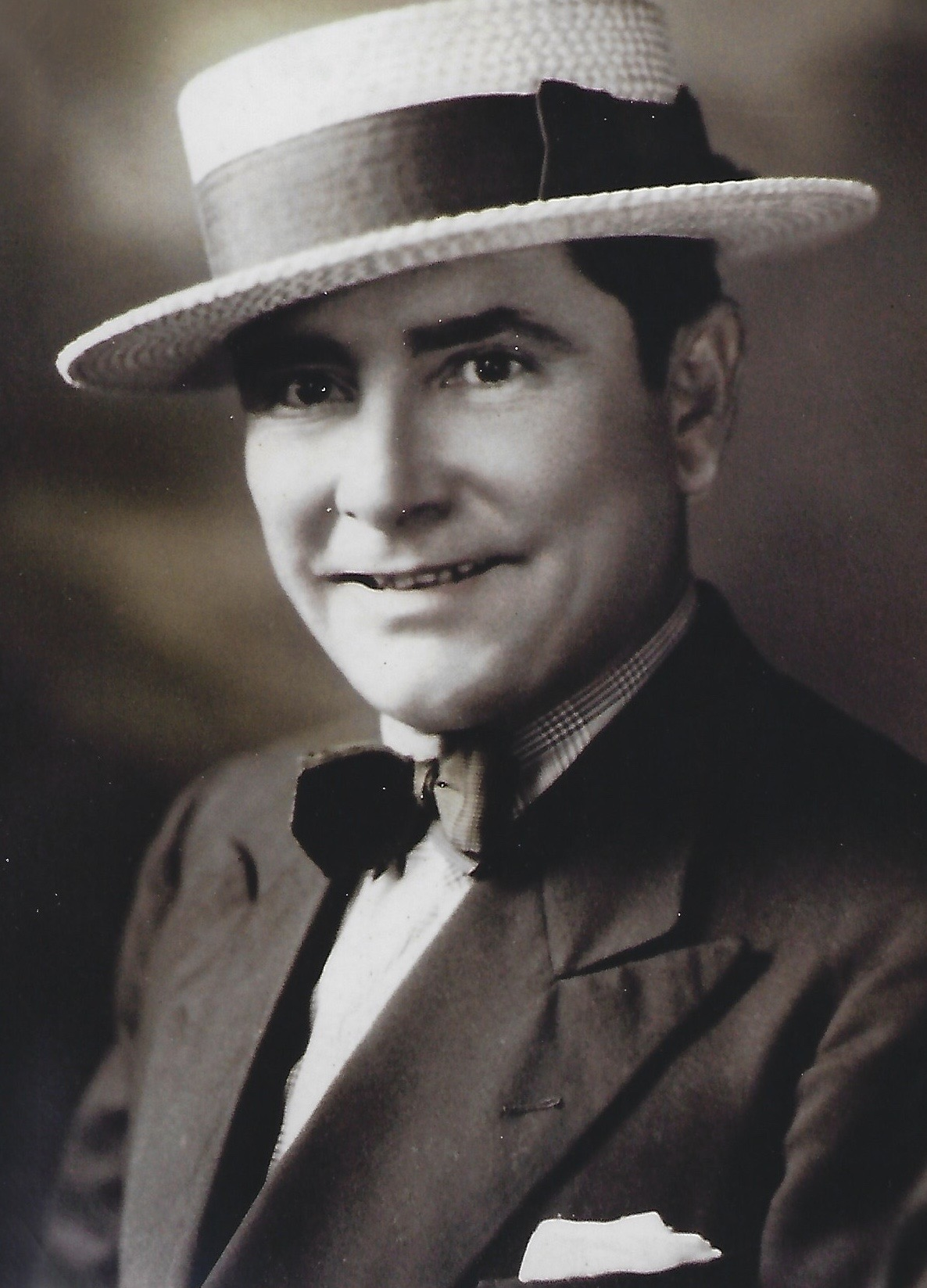
- Natalio Cirilo Banegas, circa 1933

Personal information
- Born: 9 July 1893 La Paz, Entre Rios, Argentina
- Died: 14 May 1967 (aged 73) Rosario, Santa Fe, Argentina
- Occupations: Steeplechase Jockey, Horse Trainer, Thoroughbred Horse Owner
- Spouses: Unknown (m. 1914; died 1927) Angela Bandoni (m. 1932; died 1967)
- Children: Leonelo Banegas (1914-1986); A daughter died in childhood; Leonidas Banegas (1926-2008); Jorge Raul Banegas (1932-1938); María del Carmen Banegas (1934-2012); Oscar Banegas (1939)

Horse racing career
- Sport: Horse racing
- Career wins: 80 (Jockey) 1910; 13 (Steeple Chase) 1912

Major racing wins
- Gran Premio Carlos Pellegrini (1936); President of the Republic (1939); Clssic Pueyrreden; Classic Alfredo A. and Oscar P. Casas (1960); Alfonso de la Fuente y Chai Prize (1961)

Significant horses
- Entrevero (1909), Absalón (1910), Ilota (1910), Florentina (1910), Solway (1910), Fastidio (1910), L'Empereur (1910), Bonzo (1910), Proserpine (1910), Oskold (1912), Brezo (1913), Quillay (1913), Soldier Boy (1913), Old Fellow (1913), Más o Menos (1914), El Solo (1914), Hollis (1936), Bravio (1939), Mantillo, Chillido, Martinica (1960), Rimado, Monaca (1961)
- Updated on 29 June 2020

Natalio Cirilo Banegas (9 July 1893 - 14 May 1967), also known popularly by the nicknames Don Nata, Don Nata Banegas, Benegas and Trapiche, was an Argentine jockey, steeplechase jockey, horse trainer and owner of thoroughbred horses, an emblematic figure in the horse racing history of Argentina and of the City of Rosario during the golden age of equestrianism in the first half of the 20th century. He received the highest national and regional statistics (scores) of Argentina.

== Historical context ==
To understand the scope of Natalio Cirilo Banegas' professional career historian Roy Hora in his Historia del Turf Argentino (History of the Argentine Horseracing) explains:

. . . so important was the operation of the Palermo Hippodrome that its operating cost was one of the highest in the world. What Palermo paid in salaries, horse prizes and the cost of running the racetrack was bigger than the budget of some Argentine provinces, except for the biggest ones, something that one does not find in any other country. This was so, because this (Argentina) is undoubtedly the country of the horse. When comparing Argentina with other countries, one of the most remarkable features is that the number of horses per capita is very high. That society, mounted on horseback, Hora continues, and with an enormous empathy with the animal, is what triggered the boom of horseracing. Consequently, according to Roy Hora the Argentine Republic was the leader in Latin American horse-racing. Between the end of the 1930s and the beginning of the 1950s, the number of horses registered in the Stud Book went from less than 2,000 to more than 3,000.

Furthermore, Hora expounds that the evolution of horse-racing also brought the emergence of the jockey and the horse trainer

. . . who until the early twentieth century were just figures blurred by a thoroughbred horse and its owner, a member of the richest clubs in Argentina;" and he adds that "the appearance of the popular press represented by the newspaper Crítica will no longer be content to say that such a horse owned by a millionaire won, thus the jockeys will have a broader field in which to develop their activity.

== Early life ==
Natalio Cirilo Banegas was born in the city of La Paz, Province of Entre Ríos, Argentina on 9 July 1893, a city located on the north-west corner of the province of Entre Rios. The Segundo Censo Nacional de la República Argentina (Second National Census of Argentina) of 10 May 1985 found Banegas, age one, living in the city of La Paz; however, sometime soon thereafter, he moved with his family to the north-east region of Concordia Department, specifically the districts of Yeruá and Yuquerí, where his family owned land and worked in livestock and agriculture, particularly sheep farming.

== Career ==
=== Buenos Aires (1906–1930) ===
==== Early career, groom (1906–1909) ====
Natalio Cirilo Banegas arrived in Argentina's capital, Buenos Aires, in 1906 along with renowned thoroughbred horse trainer Francisco Maschio, who was a close family friend and neighbor of his from his native Province of Entre Ríos. Maschio became a mentor and later a colleague. Once in Buenos Aires, Banegas was schooled by trainer Mr. Juan Concepción at the stables Mr. Concepción owned in the Bajo de Belgrano section of the City of Buenos Aires. At Mr. Concepción's stable he started working as a groom continuing his training in equestrianism as both a jockey's apprentice and a thoroughbred horse trainer's apprentice. Banegas regarded Mr. Concepción as ". . . the only boss he ever had."

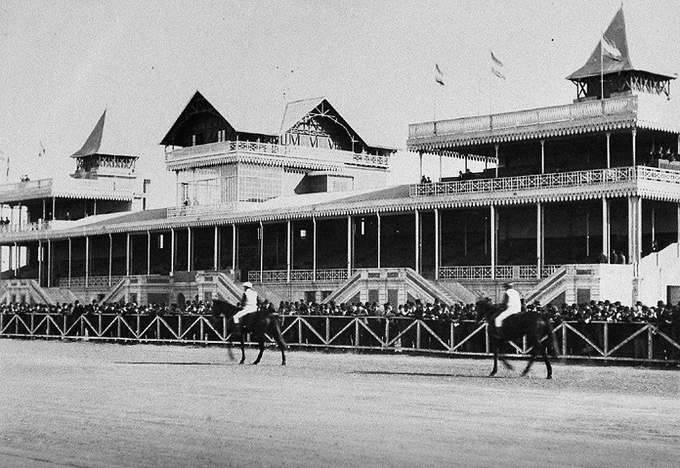
National Hippodrome of Belgrano, Buenos Aires. c. 1910

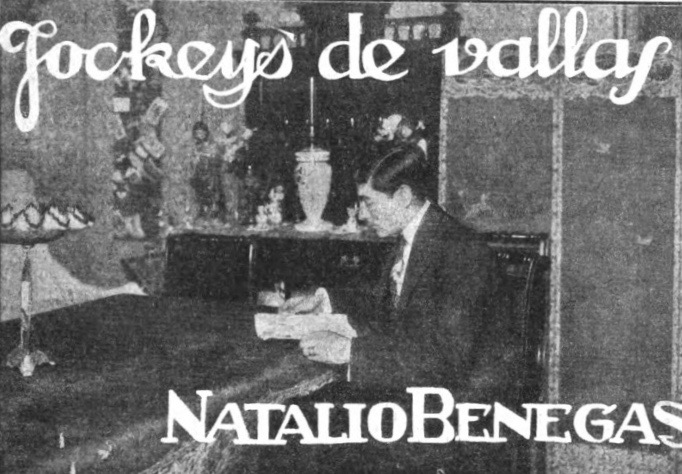
Natalio C. Banegas "At Home" reading an article about the City about the construction of the city of La Paz Port, 1914

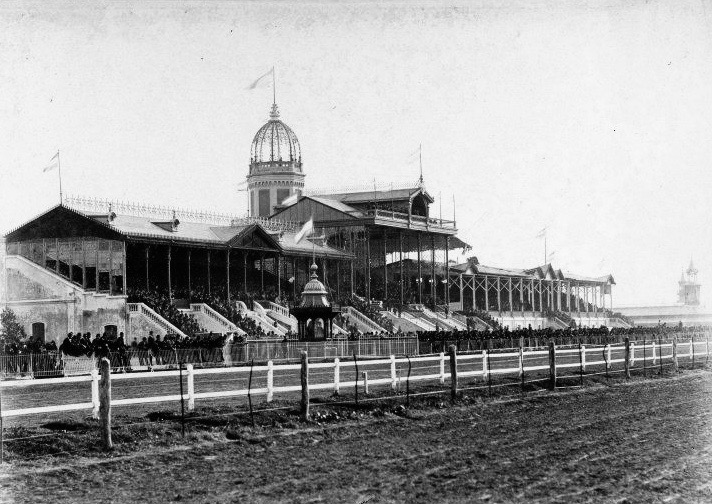
Argentine Hippodrome of Palermo, Buenos Aires, Argentina. c. 1910

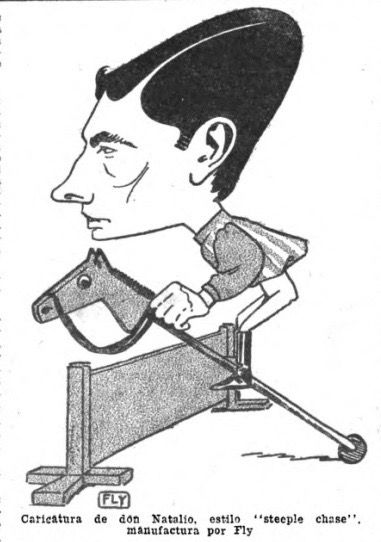
Caricature of Natalio Cirilo Banegas by Fly, 1914

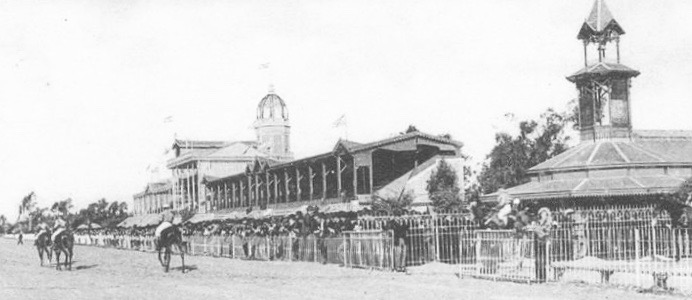
Argentine Hippodrome of Palermo, Buenos Aires, Argentina, c. 1911

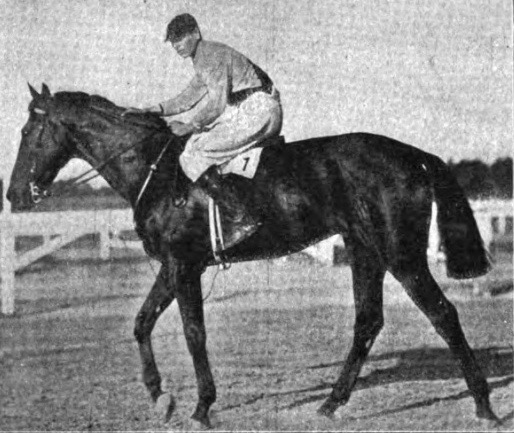
Natalio Cirilo Banegas, riding Quillay before the fall, 8 January 1913

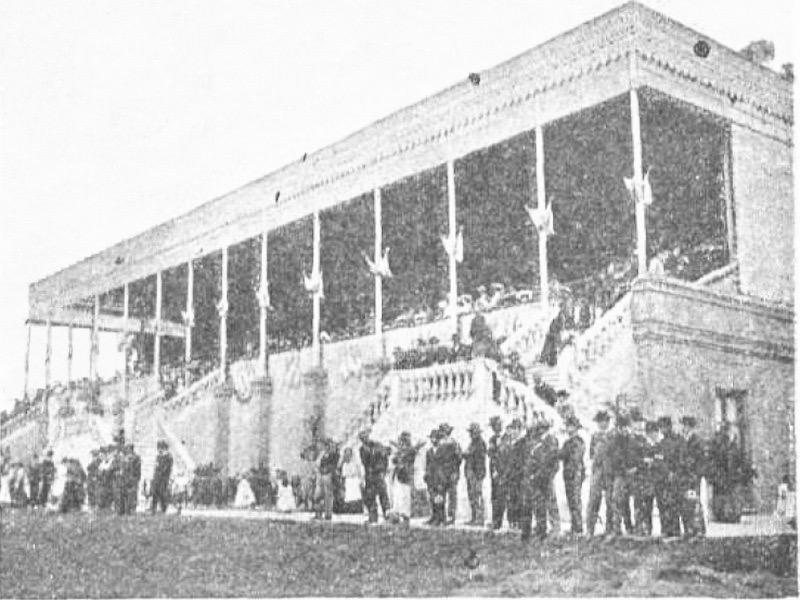
La Plata Hippodrome, Buenos Aires Province, Argentina, c. 1904

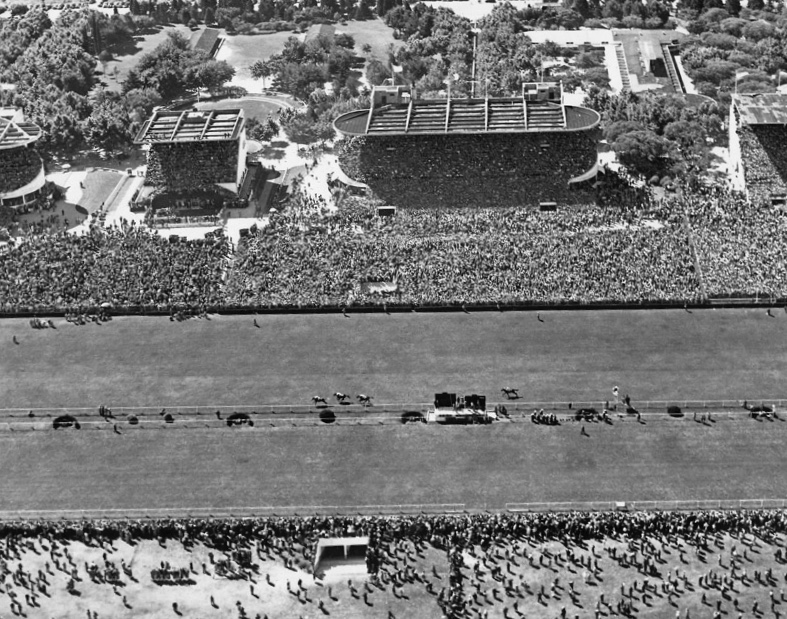
Aerial view, San Isidro Hippodrome, Buenos Aires, Argentina, c. 1935

==== Jockey (1909–1912) ====
In 1909 he obtained a license to compete as a flat race jockey (see Horse Racing 2.1) debuting with Entrevero, a horse under the training of Mr. Elías Zamora, at the Hipódromo de Belgrano (Belgrano Hippodrome).

The Hippodrome of Belgrano, also known as the Hipódromo Nacional (National Hippodrome) and Hipódromo Nacional Presidente General Bosch (National Hippodrome President General Bosch), was a racecourse active from 1887 until 1913 which officiated as the counterpart and competitor of the Hipódromo Argentino (Argentine Hippodrome) presently the Hipódromo Nacional de Palermo (National Hippodrome of Palermo).

His first victory in 1909 was with Absalón, a thoroughbred from the Stable Los Pinos and a brother of Rubicela, with which he won the 1,400 meters race and a subsequent race defeating the legendary dappled thoroughbred Realista from the stables of trainer Mr. Juan Coll, which was ridden by jockey Pedro Claverie.

Banegas third victory was with Ilota trained by Mr. Tellería with which he won another ten races. From then on he became one of the leading Argentine jockeys of his time winning at the Hipódromo Nacional (National Hippodrome) race season 1909-1910 an unprecedented statistic of 80 times. Other horses ridden by Banegas during that season were: Florentiona, Solway, Fastidio and L'Emperur, among others.

That season he later debuted at the Palermo Hippodrome (then National Hippodrome) ridding Bonzo with which he won a second place followed also by a second place with Proserpine.

==== Steeplechase Jockey (1912–1915) ====
It was in 1912 when Natalio Cirilo Banegas established himself as the leading Argentine steeplechase jockey, winning thirteen out of the twenty five events he competed in that year, including races at the hippodromes of San Martín, Palermo and Longchamps. Among some significant horses he steeplechased in 1912 were: Cogote, Oskold, Brezo (owned by Mr. Andrés Guadalupe) with which he won four victories and Quillay.

By mid-1913 Banegas had won three out of the seven events in which he had participated, not only in Buenos Aires but also in the city of San Miguel de Tucumán, riding among others: Soldier Boy, Old Fellow, El Solo, Más o Menos and Quillay.

On 8 January 1913 during a race Banegas suffered a fall in a jump riding Quillay, which caused him a grave brain concussion and left him unable for fifteen days. Quillay was the offspring of Le Samaritain and Melena, two famous champions and breeders of champions, under the care of trainer Mr. Felipe Viscay.

Banegas continued competing as a steeplechase jockey after the accident into 1914, his last recorded victory being in September 1914 with Más o Menos; afterwards, he transitioned to a career as one of the most successful thoroughbred trainers of Argentina.

==== Horse trainer, Buenos Aires (1915–1930) ====
Natalio Cirilo Banegas trained horses mostly for races at the Palermo Hippodrome (Hipódromo Argentino de Palermo) and at the San Isidro Hippodrome (Hipódromo de San Isidro) of the City of Buenos Aires as well as for the Hippodrome of the City of La Plata in the province of Buenos Aires. Banegas was associated with the leading thoroughbred horse breeding farms of Argentina, among them Stable Condal, owned by Mr. Fernando Sanjurjo, owner of the cigarette factory Condal and Staple Chapadmalal, owned by brothers Miguel and Jose A. Martinez de Hoz.

Historian Roy Hora indicates in Historia del Turf Argentino (History of the Argentine Horse-racing), in reference to the impact of the economic crisis of the 1930s on Argentine horse-racing and in particular on the Palermo Hippodrome, that ". . .the Jockey Club launched the construction of a stadium of its own. The work began in 1926, but the Crisis of the Thirties delayed the opening until December 1935". During this period, Hora explains, "several racecourses in the interior of the country also became more prominent, including. . . Rosario."

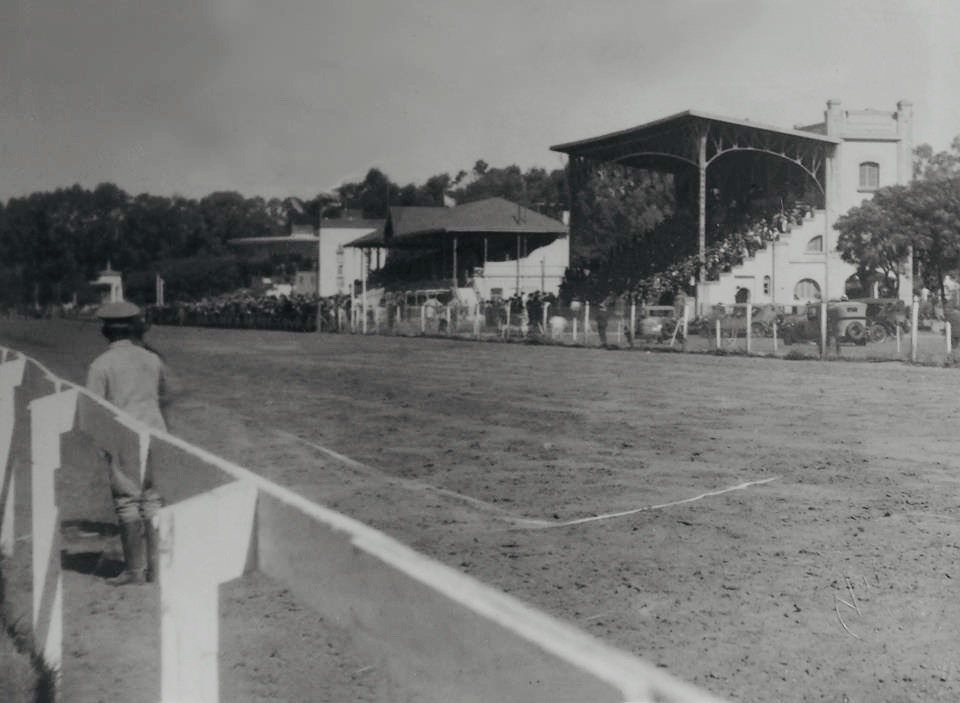
Independence Park Hippodrome, Rosario, Argentina. c. 1930

The end of 20s and beginning of the 30s found Natalio Cirilo Banegas expanding his professional activity to the City of Rosario, Santa Fe Province training horses for races at the Hipódromo Parque de La Independencia (Independence Park Hippodrome), former Rosario Jockey Club's Racecourse. He definitively settled in Rosario at the beginning of the thirties and from then on, until the end of his career, he trained horses mostly for races at the Independence Park Hippodrome of Rosario and at the Palermo Hippodrome of Buenos Aires.

=== Rosario (1930–1967) ===
==== Horse trainer, Rosario – Buenos Aires (1930–1967) ====
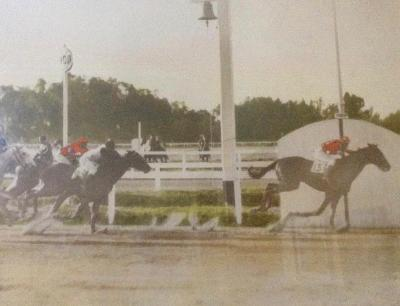
Bravio winning the President of the Republic Prize. 9/VII/1939

Natalio Cirilo Banegas stood out as a trainer of horses for long-distance races (3000 meters and 4000 meters), winning the most important prizes and classics and obtaining the highest horse-racing statistics (scores) of his time in Rosario. Among some prizes and classics won by Banegas were: the President of the Republic Prize, the Classic Pueyrredón, Grand Prize Carlos Pellegrini and the Classic Alfredo A. and Oscar P. Casas Prize.

Famous thoroughbreds under the training of Banegas included: Hollis, a horse with which Banegas won the President of the Republic Prize, the Classic Pueyrredón and the Grand Prize Carlos Pellegrini, the latter victory with Hollis, on 11 November 1936, was a 3,000 meter race and was won in the record time of 3 minutes 7 seconds.

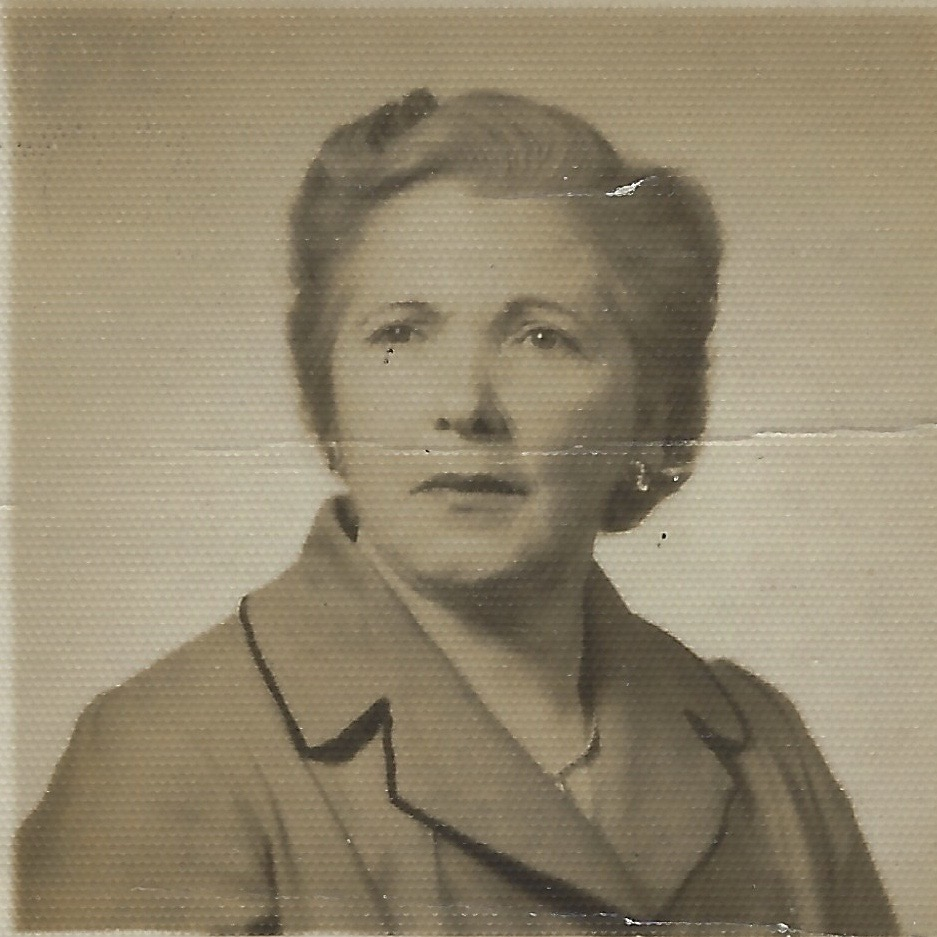
Angela Bandoni de Banegas, c. 1957

Bravio was another thoroughbred horse with which he once again won the President of the Republic Prize on 9 July 1939; Mantillo still another, which he won additionally the Classic Alfredo A. and Oscar P. Casas on 28 July 1960; and Chillido, from Stable La Estrella, a horse that Natalio Cirilo Banegas shared in partnership with Francisco H. Landó Esq., and with which he received multiple prizes.

Press headlines praised Banegas' professional success. His fame, popularized by the accounts such as El diestro entrenador de Bavio (Bravio's skilled trainer), La jornada de ayer alcanzó números eloquentes (Yesterday's ticket reached eloquent numbers), Batacazo!(Blockbuster!).

Natalio Cirilo Banegas was the owner of the Stable Asegún and he was also in charge of the Stable Sarmiento, owned by his wife Mrs. Angela Bandoni (Rosario, Argentina 10 May 1907 – 11 August 1985). Sarmiento Stable's jockey jacket is remembered for its beauty and delicate design, an original creation of Mrs. Banegas, made with a Scottish tartan fabric of beige tones on the front and back, with white sleeves and a cap of the same Scottish tartan fabric with a white visor.

==== Later years ====
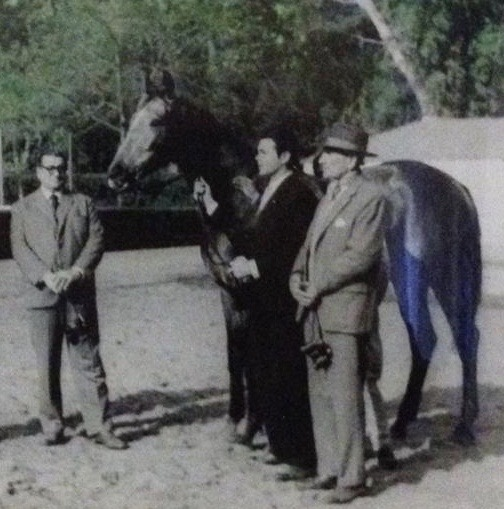
Monaca held by her trainer Mr. Oscar Banegas standing by his father Mr. Natalio C. Banegas. 25/VI/1961

The later years were crowned with multiple wins including those with Saint Nichols; Martinica, a mare from Stable JSR and Rimado, a short distance thoroughbred race horse. Natalio Cirilo Banegas envisioned that his profession as a thoroughbred horse trainer would become a family tradition. Consequently, his son Prof. Oscar Banegas, following in his father's professional footsteps, on 25 June 1961 won the prestigious Alfonso de la Fuente y Chai Prize with Monaca, a dappled mare ridden by jockey Jose Figueroa, this being the last great equestrian victory recorded by the Banegas family which occurred during the decline of equestrianism in Argentina.

Referring back to the valuable information provided by historian Roy Hora in his Historia del Turf Argentino (History of the Argentine Horse-racing)

. . . the milestone that marks the end of the growth of horse-racing occurred in 1952 at the San Isidro Racecourse with 102,600 people registered. Since then, only reduced numbers have been registered. The causes: the exponential growth of football as a mass sport, the popularity of boxing in terms of "popular heroes" and the appearance of TV as a mass phenomenon.

For the history of horse-racing in Argentina and of the City of Rosario, Natalio Cirilo Banegas left a legacy as an esteemed jockey. His bloodline pursued careers in teaching: his son Prof. Oscar Banegas, taught medicine. His two grandsons Dr. Rodrigo Natalio Banegas and Fabio L. Banegas taught medicine and classical music respectively. Both grandsons, twins, have taken his surname in his honour. Natalio Cirilo Banegas died in the City of Rosario on 14 May 1967.

== Carlos Gardel ==
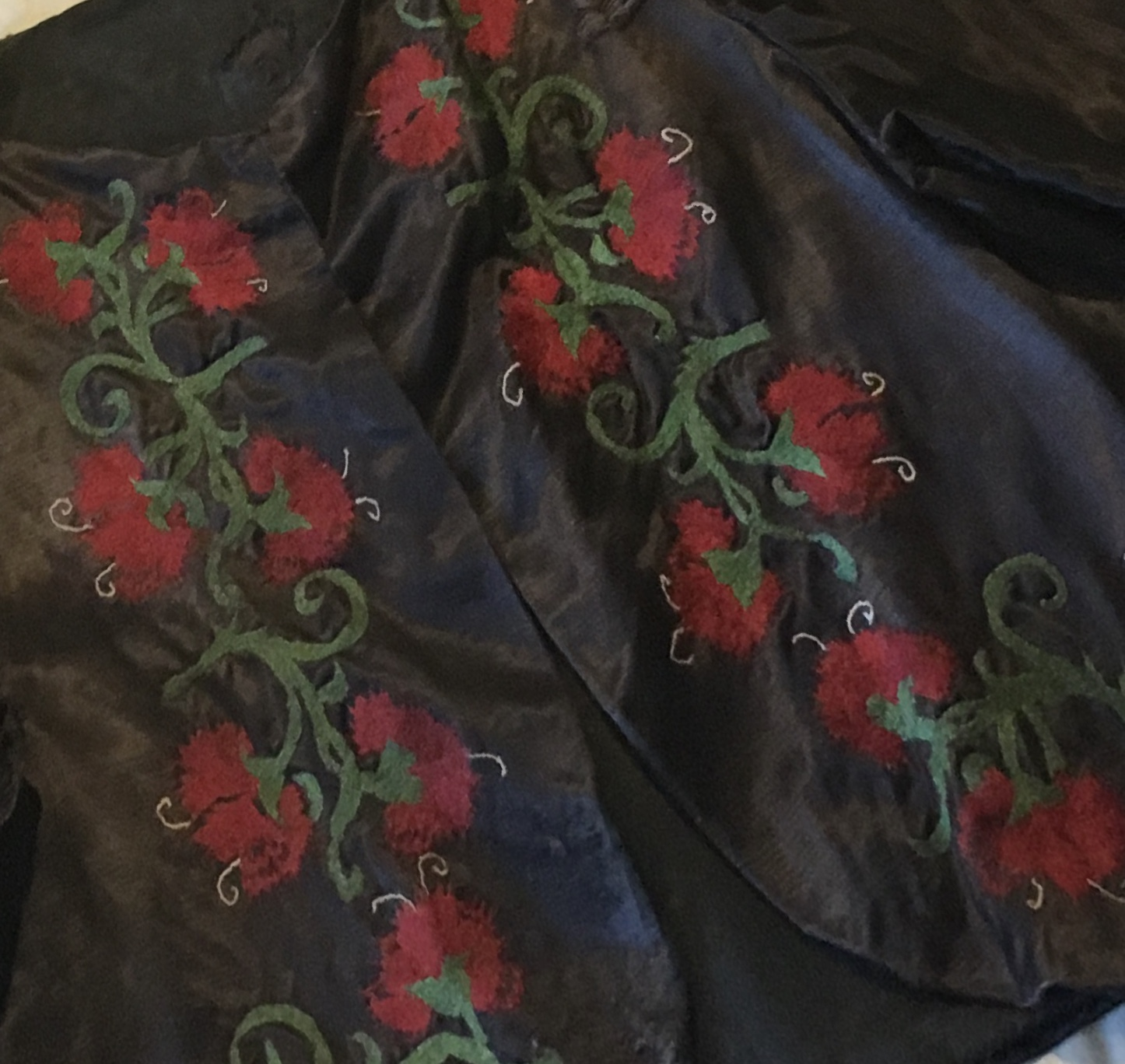
Carlos Gardel's Gaucho Jacket presented by Gardel to Natalio C. Banegas on the occasion of his last performance in Rosario, Argentina, embroidery detail. Courtesy Private Collection.

During his long career, Natalio Cirilo Banegas enjoyed the friendship of the foremost personalities of the Argentine equestrian world. Among them was his close friend, the legendary tango singer, composer and actor Carlos Gardel (1890 – 1935), with whom Banegas had a friendship that began before the start of Gardel's artistic life and spanned for more than a quarter of a century.

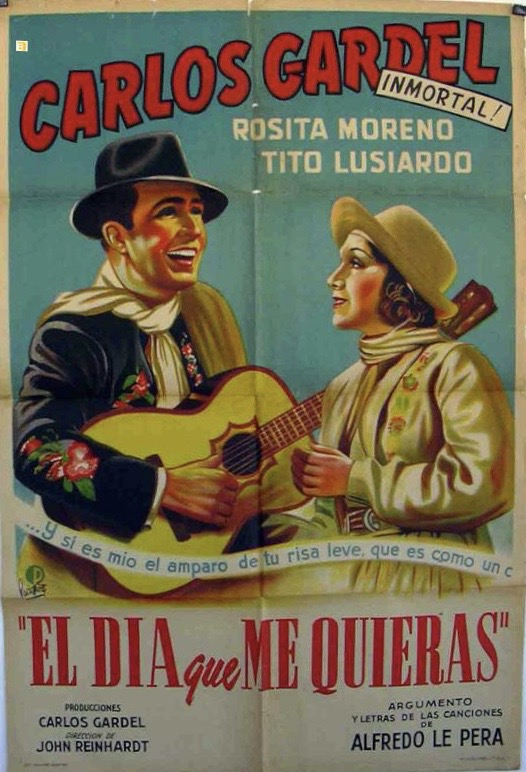
El día que me quieras (The day that you will love me). Original Poster,1935. Courtesy Private Collection.

On the night of November 15th, 1918, Carlos Gardel and Jose Razzano, then two young artists who were climbing the first steps of a promising professional career, quietly left the General Pico Hotel where they were staying and started a hurried return to the city of Buenos Aires, moved by the irrepressible desire to be present at the Palermo Hippodrome on the afternoon of Sunday, November 17, 1918. On that memorable day, Botafogo and Grey Fox would race, and not only were the 50,000 racetrack enthusiasts overflowing the facilities of the Hipódromo Argentino, but also the vast majority of the inhabitants of Buenos Aires were waiting expectantly for the tapes to be released of what was rightly considered "the race of the century.

The friendship between Carlos Gardel and Natalio Cirilo Banegas traced back to the time when Banegas was part of the group of close friendships Gardel had with jockey Irineo Leguisamo and trainer Francisco Maschio, also one of Banegas' mentors. According to Simon Collier in The Life, Music and Times of Carlos Gardel "Maschio's stable named Yeruá, on Olleros Street, was, for Gardel the focus of an alternative barra (group of friends or fans), as strong as any other he ever associated with over the years.

In his last performance in the City of Rosario, on 21–22 April 1933, at the Broadway Theater Carlos Gardel gifted Natalio Cirilo Banegas with one of his gaucho jackets, made with a black satin and embroidered with red roses. Gardel was photographed wearing this jacket by photographer José María Silva in 1923 and he wore it afterwards in his 1923 concert tour of Spain for 40 performances at the Apollo Theater of Madrid, one of which was attended by one of the Spanish Infantas, Infanta Isabel de Borbón y Borbón, "La Chata."

A similar gaucho jacket to the one Banegas received from Gardel appeared in films and movie posters as The Tango on Broadway of 1934 and El día que me quieras of 1935. This jacket was also worn alternatively in El día que me quieras by actors Tito Luciardo and Manuel Peluffo. In one of such scenes they sang the tango Suerte Negra in a trio with Carlos Gardel. Gardel died tragically on 24 June 1935,

== Colleagues ==
=== Horse trainers ===
Natalio Cirilo Banegas maintained close friendships with his colleagues, among them the trainers: Juan Concepción, Francisco Maschio, Naciamo Moreno, Elías Zamora, Tellería, Felipe Viscay, Andrés Guadalupe, Anacleto Galimbertti, Anibal "Chiquito" Giovanetti, Della Randart and Lora.

=== Jockeys ===
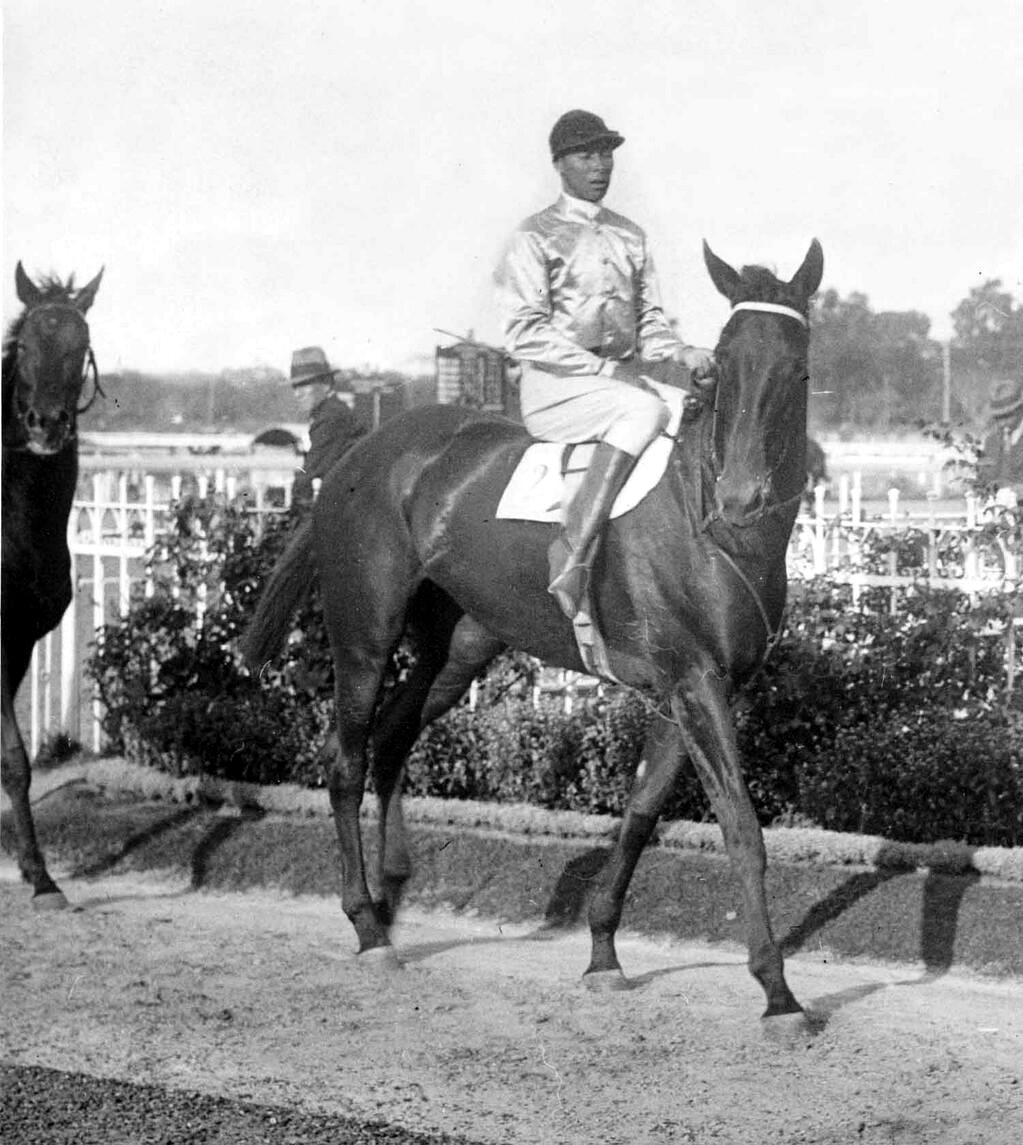
Irineo Leguisamo at the Hipódromo Argentino de Palermo in 1930

Among the jockeys who rode horses prepared by Natalio Cirilo Banegas some of whom became his close friends were: Irineo Leguisamo, Ramón Pelletier, Domingo "Mingo" Torterolo, Francisco Arcuri, Máximo Acosta, José Candal, Manuel Lema, Roberto Carabajal, Sebastián Ruíz, and Cayetano Santos "Pochi" Sauro, all active in the hippodromes of the city of Buenos Aires.

In the City of Rosario his horses were ridden among others by the following jockeys: Angel Oscar Baratucci, Félix Tomas Rodríguez, Nicasio Rubén "Machadito" Machado – riding among others Mantillo–, Oreste A. Cosenza and the brothers Jorge and Tito Mernies.

It is worth mentioning that both Cayetano Santos Sauro and Nicasio Rubén Machado came from the same equestrian school as Banegas, and likewise, they started first as grooms in the stables of Belgrano, then became jockey apprentices and finally horse-race jockey champions.

With respect to Angel Oscar Baratucci, on 15 December 1957, he won at the Independence Hippodrome in the City of Rosario all eight races programmed on that date, thus entering the Guinness Book of World Records, displacing Irineo Leguizamo himself, who held the highest mark of seven races won in one day. Regarding Cayetano Sauro, who was also one of the most renowned jockeys of his time, his career was cut short after an accident he suffered on 15 February 1969 at the San Isidro Racecourse.

== Horse owner ==
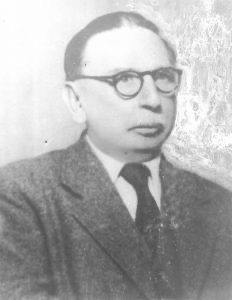
Mr. Inri Jesus Araya de Avenada, c. 1940. Founder of Inriville, province of Corodoba, Argentina

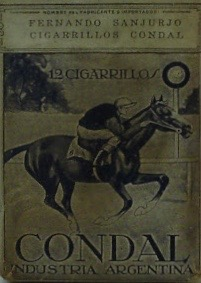
Condal Cigarette Pack, 1941

Natalio Cirilo Banegas was sole owner of many thoroughbred horse champions as was the case with Rimado and he trained horses, often in partnerships, with then influential thoroughbred horse owners. Worth citing are: Mr. Fernando Sanjurjo, owner of the Cigarette Factory Condal and thoroughbred Horse Farm Condal; Mr. Marcel Baurin, shareholder of the automobile company Peugeot and landowner; Messrs. Roberto, Bartolo, Miguel and Fernando Monserrat, owners of Monserrat Bank Ltd., substantial real-estate holders and businessmen in the City of Rosario.

Additionally Banegas trained horses for Mr. Inri Jesus Araya de Avenada, landowner and founder of Inriville, a town in the Province of Córdoba, businessmen 'Mr. Santiago Palma and Mr. Pedro Claverie; industrialist Mr. Miguel Angel Langelotti and Mr. Juan Francisco Rosetti, Lottery Concessionaire of the Province of Santa Fe and also owner of the Stable JFR.

Among political personas of the time, he trained horses for Mr. Francisco H. Landó Esq., Minister of Education of the province of Santa Fe and Mr. Svetkov, the Acting Mayor of the City of Rosario. Mr. Svetkov was also the godfather of his youngest son Prof. Oscar Banegas.
