= The House Is Serious =

1933 film

- Directed by: Lucien Jaquelux
- Produced by: Alfredo Le Pera
- Starring: Carlos Gardel
- Music by: Carlos Gardel Marcel Lattès
- Release date: 1933
- Running time: 25 minutes
- Countries: Argentina, France
- Language: Spanish

The House Is Serious (La Casa es Seria) is a picaresque musical short film directed by Lucien Jaquelux (credited as Jaquelux). It belongs to a series of French films starring Argentinian tango singer Carlos Gardel and was made by Paramount Pictures in its French Joinville Studios at Joinville-him-Pont. The film features Gardel and co-stars the Argentinian-Spanish actress Imperio Argentina. The script was written by the Brazilian Alfredo Le Pera. Gardel sings two songs with Le Pera; Memory malevo and Want to me, the latter having been recorded on a disc.

It premiered on May 19, 1933, in the Suipacha Theater in Buenos Aires. All copies of the film have been lost. Only its audio has survived, which was recorded on Vitaphone disks.

== Background ==
In 1931, Carlos Gardel had managed to get the American company Paramount to hire him to perform in his first sound feature film, Lights of Buenos Aires. The film was made at Paramount's studio in Joinville-him-Pont, 40 kilometers southwest of the French capital. The studio was dedicated to producing films for non-American markets. The following year, however, Paramount France was in a crisis due to the Great Depression, and because of a tense political climate. These events taking place only a few months before Hitler took power in Germany. Even with this, and with Carlos Gardel deciding to return to Buenos Aires, when the first semester of 1932 had already passed without incidents, Paramount chose to move forward with new movies that included the Argentinian singer.

Within the framework of this project, the first feature film of the series titled Wait for Me was filmed in September 1932. Wait for Me was directed by Louis Gasnier using an adapted American script. Immediately after the filming of Wait for Me ended, Paramount chose the Argentine-Spanish actress Imperio Argentina to produce Suburban Melody in November of 1932, and the short film titled The House Is Serious that was filmed in December 1932.

That year the presence of the Brazilian Alfredo Le Pera, with whom Gardel had begun to build a rapport with in December of the previous year had become important. Le Pera assumed the duties of screenwriter for the films and lyricist of the songs whose melodies Gardel had composed.

All of the copies of the film have been lost, including the originals that were destroyed in 1940 during the Second World War when German troops bombed the Paramount studios in Joinville. Only audio recordings on Vitaphone discs have survived.

== Plot ==
Gardel plays Juan Carlos Romero, a tango singer who insists on conquering the ballerina Carmen Rivera, played by Imperio Argentina. The dancer rejected the singer's attempts to woo her over and over again, explaining to him that she was not "free", that she had a "very jealous" friend, and that she lived in a "serious house". Eventually, she finally gives in and agrees to receive Gardel at the house, at one in the morning, agreeing that when he whistles she would throw the keys to him so he could come in. Upon arrival, Gardel whistles, and several girls lean out and throw their keys. The film closes with Gardel saying: "And this is a serious house? My God!"

== Cast ==
- Carlos Gardel
- Imperio Argentina
- Lolita Benavente
- Josita Hernán
- Manuel Paris

== See also ==
- Carlos Gardel
- Cinema of Argentina
- Cinema of Latin America
