= Maschio =

Maschio (Italian, 'male' or 'castle keep') is an Italian surname. People with this surname include:

- Aurelius Maschio (died 1996), Italian priest and missionary in India
- Francisco Maschio (born 1890s), Argentinian horse race trainer
- Giovanni Maschio (born 2006), Italian racing driver
- Humberto Maschio (born 1933), Italian Argentine footballer
- Mickaël Maschio (born 1973), French motocross racer
- Robert Maschio (born 1966), American actor

== See also ==
- "Maschio" (song), a 2025 song by Annalisa
- The dictionary definition of maschio at Wiktionary
- Ciao maschio, a 1978 Italian-French film
- Nebbieul Maschio, a grape variety
- Maschio Angioino, a castle in Naples, Italy
