= Vicente Padula =

Argentine film actor

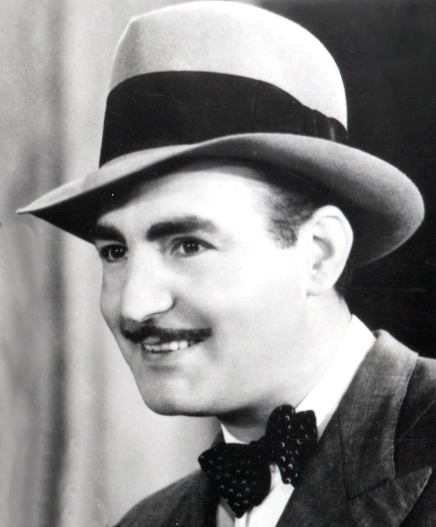
- Born: 14 July 1898; Buenos Aires, Argentina
- Died: 16 January 1967 (aged 68); Glendale, California, United States
- Occupation: Actor
- Years active: 1927-1965 (film)

Vicente Padula (July 14, 1898 – January 16, 1967) was an Argentine film actor. Padula moved to the United States, and appeared regularly in Hollywood films. He also made films in Mexico. Padula was a friend of the Argentine film star Carlos Gardel and appeared in several of his American films including Suburban Melody (1933) which was one of the highest-grossing film in their native Argentina that year.

== Partial filmography ==
- Winds of the Pampas (1927) - Emilio
- Charros, gauchos y manolas (1930) - Argentinian Artist
- El cuerpo del delito (1930) - Sargento Heath
- La fuerza del querer (1930) - Steve
- Amor audaz (1930) - Silvestre Corbett
- Del mismo barro (1930) - Señor Fullerton
- El último de los Vargas (1930) - Blanco
- El presidio (1930) - Dunn
- Monsieur Le Fox (1930)
- Gente alegre (1931) - Max
- The Lights of Buenos Aires (1931) - Ciriaco
- La barra de Taponazo (1932)
- Suburban Melody (1933) - Gutiérrez
- Aves sin rumbo (1934) - El Italiano
- Downward Slope (1934) - Jorge Linares
- The Tango on Broadway (1934) - Juan Carlos
- La viuda quería emociones (1935)
- La justicia de Pancho Villa (1939) - Vicente Múgica
- Una luz en mi camino (1939)
- Explosivo 008 (1940)
- Las cinco advertencias de Satanás (1941)
- The Road of the Llamas (1942)
- Cuando quiere un mexicano (1944)
- Gran Hotel (1944) - Conde Zapattini
- Los hijos de Don Venancio (1944) - Fontanals
- El camino de las llamas (1944)
- Bésame mucho (1945) - Tío Guiseppe
- Bartolo toca la flauta (1945) - Renard
- Canaima (1945) - Vellorini el bueno
- Una vírgen moderna (1946)
- The Associate (1946) - Don Fortunato
- La hija del payaso (1946)
- Los nietos de Don Venancio (1946) - Fontanals (uncredited)
- Se acabaron las mujeres (1946) - Che Gómez
- Ella (1946) - Carlos
- Nace la libertad (1949)
- The Avengers (1950) - El Mocho / Hernandez
- Three Coins in the Fountain (1954) - Dr. Martinelli (uncredited)
- The Last Command (1955) - General Cos (uncredited)
- The Girl Rush (1955) - Maitre d' (uncredited)
- Serenade (1956) - Pagnil (uncredited)
- The Three Outlaws (1956) - Mr. Gutzmer
- The Brass Legend (1956) - Sanchez
- The Cyclops (1957) - The Governor
- Hell Canyon Outlaws (1957) - Julio
- The Flame Barrier (1958) - Julio
- Pier 5, Havana (1959) - General (uncredited)
- Raymie (1960) - Veulo
- Alfred Hitchcock Presents (1962) (Season 7 Episode 35: "The Children of Alda Nuova") - Waiter (credited as Vincent Padula)

== Bibliography ==
- Finkielman, Jorge. The Film Industry in Argentina: An Illustrated Cultural History. McFarland, 2003.
