= Downward Slope =

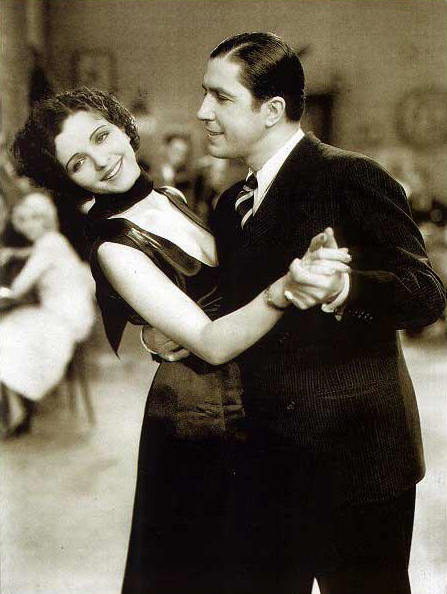
- Mona Maris and Carlos Gardel
- Directed by: Louis J. Gasnier
- Written by: Alfredo Le Pera
- Produced by: Samuel E. Piza
- Starring: Carlos Gardel; Mona Maris; Vicente Padula
- Cinematography: George Webber
- Music by: Alberto Castellanos; Carlos Gardel
- Production company: Exito Productions
- Distributed by: Paramount Pictures
- Release date: 10 August 1934
- Running time: 74 minutes
- Countries: Argentina; United States
- Language: Spanish

Downward Slope (Spanish:Cuesta abajo) is a 1934 American-Argentine musical film directed by Louis J. Gasnier and starring Carlos Gardel, Mona Maris and Vicente Padula.

== Cast ==
- Carlos Gardel as Carlos Acosta
- Mona Maris as Raquel
- Vicente Padula as Jorge Linares
- Anita Campillo as Rosa
- Jaime Devesa as Bastida
- Guillermo Arcos as Don Pedro
- Suzanne Dulier as Aida
- Manuel Peluffo as Gutierrez
- Carlos Spaventa as Corrales

== Bibliography ==
- Corey Creekmur & Linda Mokdad. The International Film Musical. Edinburgh University Press, 2012.
