= José Sentis =

Spanish pianist and composer

José Sentis (11 June 1888 in Tarragona, Spain - 20 March 1983 in Ivry, France) was a Spanish pianist and composer.

José Sentis started his career as pianist in the music salons of Paris. Due to the influence of Argentinean friends like the musician Buchardo Alberto Lopez and the writer Ricardo Güiraldes he primarily performed tango music and wrote some tango compositions himself as well. Among his compositions are such pieces as "Baby", "Mr. Marquis", "Spring", "From 5 to 7", "Volver" and "Bad Love". He is credited for being one of the musician that made tango music popular in the Paris of the early 20th century.

Later José Sentis toured outside France as well and gave concerts in Venezuela, Cuba and the USA. During the 1920s and 1930s, he had his own orchestra. Occasionally, he composed music for movies and TV shows most notably for the tango movie Melodía de arrabal.
