= El día que me quieras (film) =

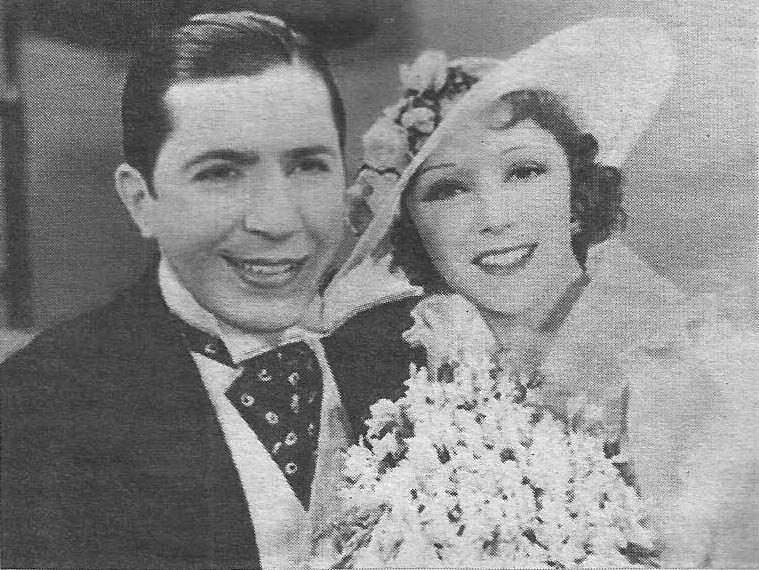
- Carlos Gardel and Rosita Moreno, who starred in the film.
- Directed by: John Reinhardt
- Written by: Alfredo Le Pera
- Produced by: Robert R. Snody
- Starring: Carlos Gardel; Rosita Moreno; Tito Lusiardo
- Cinematography: William Miller
- Music by: Carlos Gardel (music); Alfredo Le Pera (lyrics)
- Distributed by: Paramount Pictures
- Release date: 1935
- Running time: 82 minutes
- Country: United States
- Language: Spanish

El día que me quieras is a 1935 musical film starring tango singer Carlos Gardel, Spanish actress Rosita Moreno, and tango singer Tito Lusiardo. The film was directed by Austrian-born John Reinhardt, produced by Robert R. Snody through Gardel's production company Éxito Productions, and written by tango lyricist Alfredo Le Pera.

Filmed in January 1935 at Paramount's Kaufman Astoria Studios in Queens, New York, the film was the third of Gardel's American productions and represented a significant improvement in quality over his previous films. Gardel considered it his best cinematic work, writing to his agent four days before his death that "I still think that it is my best work in films, and that we have topped everything with its songs." The film premiered on July 5, 1935, in Havana, Cuba, just eleven days after Gardel and Le Pera died in a plane crash in Medellín, Colombia, on June 24, 1935.

The film features several of Gardel and Le Pera's most iconic tangos, including the title song "El día que me quieras," "Volver," and "Sus ojos se cerraron." A young Astor Piazzolla, who would later revolutionize tango, appears in a brief cameo as a newspaper boy.

== Plot ==
The film tells the story of Julio Arguelles, the son of a wealthy Buenos Aires businessman, who wants to marry Margarita, who is considered to be below his social status. Despite his father’s opposition, they marry and elope together. The film then traces the life of the couple and, following the death of the young Margarita, concludes with Julio’s rise to fame as a tango singer. Astor Piazzolla, who in later life would revolutionize traditional tango, played a cameo role as a young paperboy.

== Cast ==
- Carlos Gardel (Julio Argüelles, the son)
- Rosita Moreno (Margarita/Marga, the young wife)
- Tito Lusiardo (Rocamora)
- Manuel Peluffo (Saturnino)
- Francisco Flores del Campo (Daniel Dávila)
- José Luis Tortosa (Pedro Dávila)
- Fernando Adelantado (Carlos Argüelles, the father)
- Suzanne Dulie (Pepita)
- Celia Villa (Juanita)
- Agustín Cornejo (guitar player)
- Alberto Infanta (policeman)
- Astor Piazzolla (newspaper boy)

== Songs ==
The film features the following songs all with music by Carlos Gardel and lyrics by Alfredo Le Pera:

- Suerte negra - a country waltz sung as a trio by Carlos Gardel, Tito Lusiardo and Manuel Peluffo.
- Sol tropical - a rumba.
- El día que me quieras - a tango sung as a duet in the final part of the film by Carlos Gardel y Rosita Moreno.
- Sus ojos se cerraron - a tango.
- Guitarra, guitarra mía - a country song.
- Volver - a tango.
