= Blanca Vischer =

Guatemalan-American actress (1915-1969)

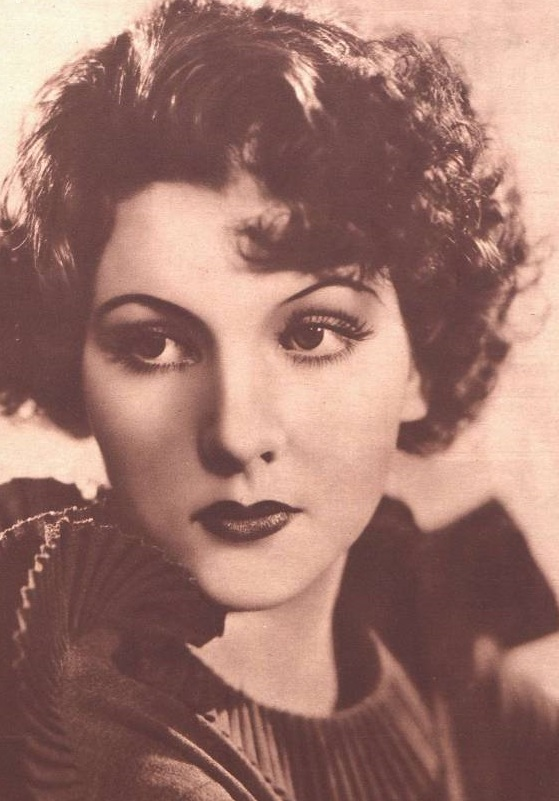
- Vischer in 1935
- Born: January 5, 1915; Quetzaltenango, Guatemala
- Died: November 24, 1969 (aged 54); Los Angeles, California, United States
- Other name: Blanca Stella Vischer
- Occupation: Actress
- Years active: 1932-1951 (film)

Blanca Vischer (January 5, 1915 – November 24, 1969) was a Guatemalan film actress who moved to the United States where she made most of her films. Vischer generally played supporting or minor roles, but occasionally played more prominent characters particularly in Spanish-language films made by American studios such as The Tango on Broadway (1934) in which she was third billed. Vischer also appeared in several Mexican films. In 1936, she featured in the Hollywood spy drama film A Message to Garcia (1936).

== Filmography ==
- 1934: The Tango on Broadway – Laurita
- 1934: Wild Gold – One of the Golden Girls
- 1935: Under the Pampas Moon – Elena
- 1936: The Bohemian Girl – Serenaded Gypsy (uncredited)
- 1936: The Devil on Horseback – Manuela Torres
- 1936: A Message to Garcia – Chiquita
- 1938: You and Me – Flower Girl (uncredited)
- 1939: The Black Beast – Consuelo
- 1939: Another Thin Man – Woman Sitting with Nick in Cafe (uncredited)
- 1940: Billy the Kid's Gun Justice – Juanita (as Blanca Visher)
- 1940: Cookoo Cavaliers – Pepita (uncredited)
- 1951: Fury of the Congo – Mahara (uncredited)

== Bibliography ==
- Wilson, Victoria. A Life of Barbara Stanwyck: Steel-True 1907-1940. Simon and Schuster, 2013.
