= Lucien Jaquelux =

French art director

- Born: 18 August 1894; Orléans, France
- Died: 25 September 1946 (aged 52); Langres, France
- Occupations: Art director, Film director
- Years active: 1926–1943 (film)

Lucien Jaquelux (1894–1946) was a French set designer and film director. He also worked as a painter and illustrator. He began his filmmaking career in the silent era.

== Selected filmography ==
- The Nude Woman (1926)
- Celle qui domine (1927)
- Palaces (1927)
- The Farewell Waltz (1928)
- La Possession (1929)
- The Mystery of the Yellow Room (1930)
- Arthur (1931)
- Méphisto(1931)
- Le refuge (1931)
- The House is Serious (1931)
- The Picador (1932)
- My Hat (1933)
- The Imaginary Invalid (1934)
- Grisou (1938)
- The Innocent (1938)
- In the Sun of Marseille (1938)
- The Most Beautiful Girl in the World (1938)
- Threats (1940)
- Three Argentines in Montmartre (1941)
- Moulin Rouge (1941)
- White Patrol (1942)
- Room 13 (1942)
- White Wings (1943)

== Bibliography ==
- Goble, Alan. The Complete Index to Literary Sources in Film. Walter de Gruyter, 1999.
- Rège, Philippe. Encyclopedia of French Film Directors, Volume 1. Scarecrow Press, 2009.
