= The Picador (film) =

1932 film

- Directed by: Lucien Jaquelux
- Release date: 1932
- Running time: 91 minutes
- Country: France
- Language: French

The Picador (French: Le picador) is a 1932 French drama film directed by Lucien Jaquelux and starring Ginette d'Yd, Madeleine Guitty and Jean Mauran.

== Cast ==
- Ginette d'Yd
- Madeleine Guitty
- Jean Mauran
- Enrique Rivero
- Pedro Elviro

== Bibliography ==
- Crisp, Colin. Genre, Myth and Convention in the French Cinema, 1929-1939. Indiana University Press, 2002.
