= Por una cabeza =

1935 song by Carlos Gardel and Alfredo Le Pera

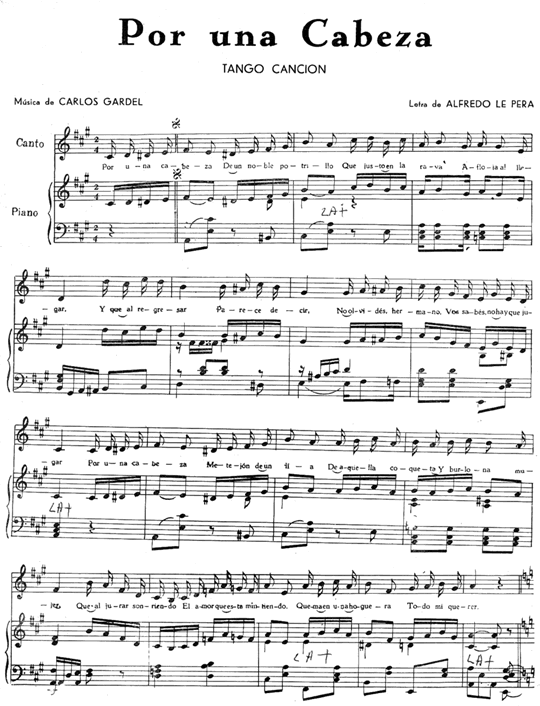

Song by Carlos Gardel
- Language: Spanish
- Written: 1935
- Genre: Tango
- Length: 2:34
- Label: RCA Victor
- Composer: Carlos Gardel
- Lyricist: Alfredo Le Pera

"Por una Cabeza" in an English translation by Adam Cuerden

"Por una cabeza" (pronounced [poɾ ˈuna kaˈβesa]) is a tango song composed by Carlos Gardel with lyrics by Alfredo Le Pera for the 1935 film Tango Bar.

The title of the song is a Spanish horse-racing phrase meaning "by a head", which refers to a horse winning (or losing) a race narrowly – by just the length of its head. The lyrics speak of a compulsive horse-track gambler who compares his addiction for horse racing with his attraction to women.

== Notable uses ==
"Por una cabeza" is featured in a famous tango scene in Martin Brest's film Scent of a Woman (1992), in the opening scene of Steven Spielberg's Schindler's List (1993), and in James Cameron's True Lies (1994).

== Copyright ==
Le Pera and Gardel died together in an aeroplane crash in Medellín, Colombia, on June 24, 1935. After the 70-year period required by Argentine law had elapsed, as of January 1, 2006, “Por una cabeza”—its music and lyrics—as well as all the joint works by both authors, entered the public domain.

== See also ==
- Music of Argentina
- Public domain music
