= Francisco Maschio =

Argentine racehorse trainer

Francisco Maschio was a horse race trainer, born in Argentina in the 1890s known as Brujo de Olleros. Maschio began his career working at a Maronas racetrack, Montevideo, Uruguay as thoroughbred trainer. Lately he went to Buenos Aires, Argentina by invitation of the famous tango singer Carlos Gardel. His stables ( named Stud Yeruá ) was localized at Olleros Street, Palermo, Buenos Aires, near the actual Olleros Station. He was the trainer of the horses of Carlos Gardel, including the legendary Lunático. He won many statistics in Hipodromo de Palermo.
