= The Tango on Broadway =

El Tango en Broadway
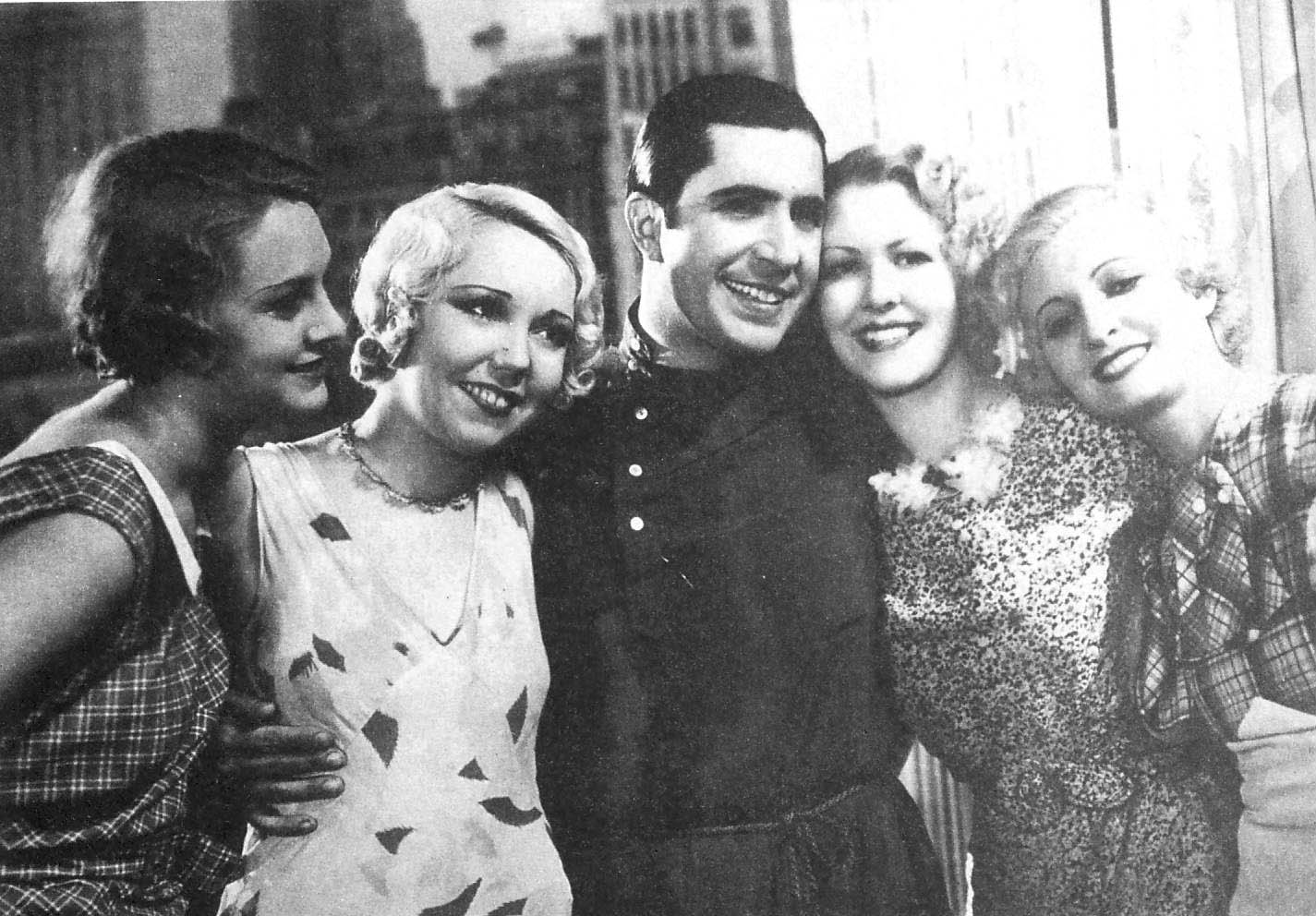
- Carlos Gardel promoting the film in New York.
- Directed by: Louis J. Gasnier
- Written by: Alfredo Le Pera
- Starring: Carlos Gardel; Trini Ramos; Blanca Vischer; Vicente Padula
- Cinematography: William Miller
- Music by: Alberto Castellanos; Carlos Gardel
- Production company: Exito Productions
- Distributed by: Paramount Pictures
- Release date: December 28, 1934
- Running time: 85 minutes
- Country: United States
- Language: Spanish

El Tango en Broadway (English: The Tango on Broadway) is a 1934 American musical film directed by Louis J. Gasnier and starring Carlos Gardel, Trini Ramos, and Blanca Vischer. The film was a Spanish-language production made in the United States, for release to Spanish-speaking audiences at home and abroad without English subtitles. It was released by Paramount Pictures and filmed at the company's New York Studios. Gardel was a popular Argentine singer of tango music who made a number of films for Paramount before his death in 1935. Like Gardel's other American films, it is not a version of an existing English-language film, but a completely original story. By contrast, most of Hollywood's Spanish language films were remakes of English productions.

== Cast ==
- Carlos Gardel as Alberto Bazán
- Trini Ramos as Celia
- Blanca Vischer as Laurita
- Vicente Padula as Juan Carlos
- Jaime Devesa as Don Indalecio Bazán
- Suzanne Dulier as Susana
- Manuel Peluffo as El hombre blanco
- Don Alberto as Morales
- Agustín Cornejo as Cornejo
- Carlos Spaventa as Carlos
- Carlos Gianotti as El gaucho
- José Moriche as Piñata
- Dan Duryea as Bob - Laurita's Boyfriend

== Bibliography ==
- Nataša Durovicová, Kathleen E. Newman. World Cinemas, Transnational Perspectives. Routledge, 2010.
