= Volver (song) =

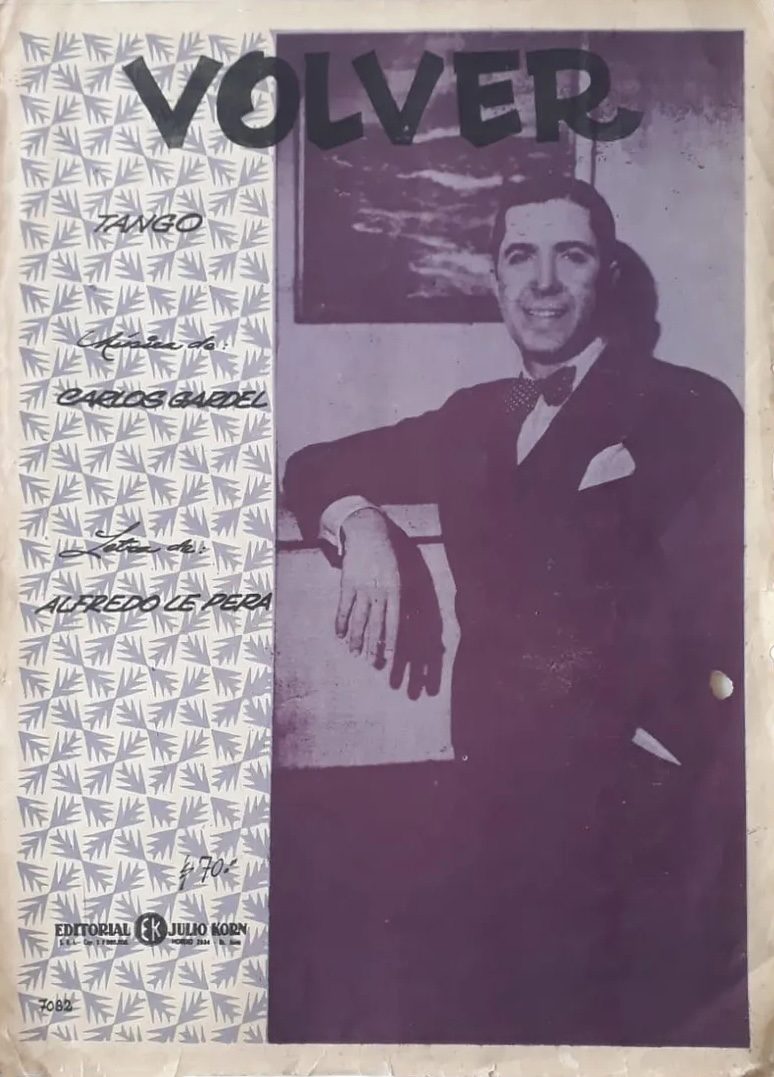
- Sheet music of the tango Volver, 1961.

Song
- Genre: Tango
- Length: 2:48
- Songwriter(s): Composer: Carlos Gardel; Lyricist: Alfredo Le Pera

Volver is a tango song created in 1934 by Carlos Gardel and Alfredo Le Pera. Gardel composed and performed the music, and Le Pera wrote the lyrics. This tango has been covered by multiple singers, including Luis Miguel, Julio Iglesias, Libertad Lamarque, Los Panchos, Elisa and Andres Calamaro.

Also singers like Caetano Veloso, Concha Buika and Dulce Pontes performed it on stage.

The title of Pedro Almodóvar’s film Volver (2006) is inspired by this tango. The song is also sung in one of the film’s scenes.

== Covers ==
- Richard Clayderman, instrumental version in his Tango Passion Album in 1996
- Luis Miguel, published in the disk Mis Romances of 2001.
- Estrella Morente, for the 2006 film Volver.
- Il Divo, the vocal quartet of masculine singers; the Swiss tenor Urs Bühler, the Spanish baritone Carlos Marín, the American tenor David Miller and the singer French pop Sébastien Izambard, together with the Colombian producer Julio Reyes Copello, recorded the song for the album Amor & Pasión of Il Divo in 2015.
- Rosalía, in her Los Ángeles Tour of 2018 and with Juanes in 2019.
