= Alfredo Le Pera =

Argentine tango lyricist and screenwriter (1900–1935)

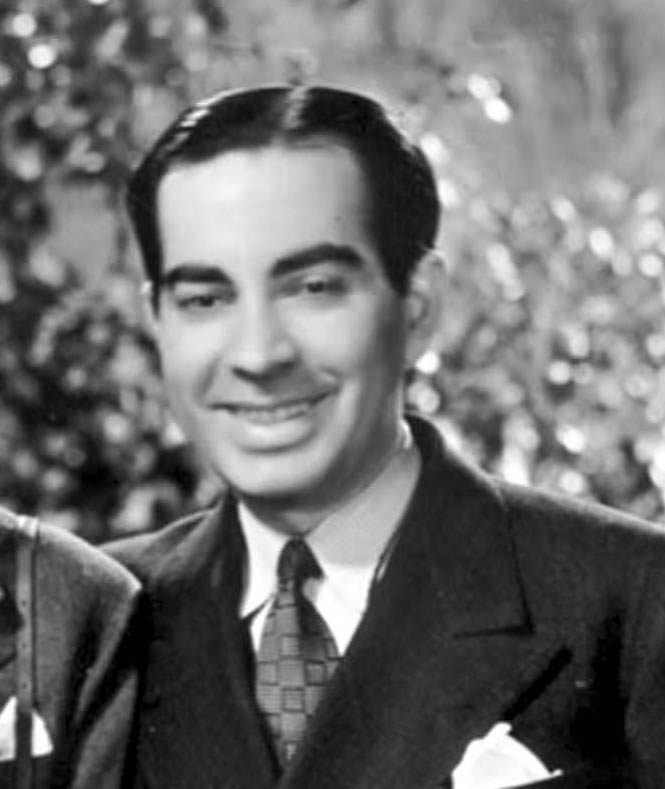
- Born: Alfredo Le Pera; June 7, 1900; São Paulo, Brazil
- Died: June 24, 1935 (aged 35); Medellín, Colombia
- Cause of death: Aviation accident
- Resting place: La Chacarita Cemetery, Buenos Aires, Argentina
- Occupations: Journalist; Lyricist; Screenwriter; Dramatist
- Years active: 1920–1935
- Known for: Collaboration with Carlos Gardel
- Notable work: "Por una cabeza"; "Volver"; "Mi Buenos Aires querido"; "El día que me quieras"
- Parent(s): Alfonso Le Pera; Maria Sorrentino

Alfredo Le Pera (7 June 1900 – 24 June 1935) was a Brazilian-born Argentine journalist, screenwriter, dramatist and lyricist, best known for his highly productive collaboration with tango singer Carlos Gardel between 1932 and 1935.

Together, they created some of tango's most enduring classics, including "Por una cabeza", "Volver", "Mi Buenos Aires querido", and "El día que me quieras". Le Pera wrote the screenplays for Gardel's series of Paramount Pictures films and composed the lyrics for the tangos featured in them, which became standards of the genre across the Spanish-speaking world.

He is credited with elevating the literary quality of tango lyrics while maintaining the popular character of the musical form. Le Pera died alongside Gardel in a plane crash in Medellín, Colombia, at the age of 35.

== Biography ==
Le Pera was born in São Paulo, Brazil, the son of Italian immigrants who moved to Buenos Aires, Argentina in 1902. At the beginning of his career, he worked for several Argentinian periodicals as a journalist and theatre critic and in 1928 became involved in the film industry. He worked for Paramount Pictures while living in Paris and in 1932 the studio arranged for him to work with Carlos Gardel, at a time when the company was looking for ways to increase Gardel's international appeal. Le Pera wrote the scripts for a series of films, including Melodía de Arrabal (1933), Cuesta abajo (1934), El Tango en Broadway (1934), El día que me quieras (1935) and Tango Bar (1935), and also wrote the lyrics for tangos composed and performed by Gardel in these films. These tangos would become classics of the genre across the Spanish-speaking world.

Gardel and Le Pera were coming to the end of a promotional tour for the film El dia que me quieras when, on Monday, 24 June 1935, the plane in which they were taking off from the airport in Medellín, Colombia crashed into another plane on the runway, killing them both and most of the other passengers on board, including the other musicians travelling with them.

Le Pera is credited with elevating the literary quality of tango lyrics while respecting the popular character of the musical form.

== Lyrics ==
Le Pera wrote the lyrics and Gardel the music for the following compositions:

- Amargura (tango)
- Amores de Estudiante (waltz)
- Apure, delantero buey (song)
- Arrabal amargo (tango)
- Caminito soleado (song)
- Cheating muchachita
- Criollita, decí que sí (song)
- Cuesta abajo (tango)
- El día que me quieras (song)
- Golondrinas (tango)
- Guitarra, guitarra mía
- La criolla
- La vida en un trago
- Lejana tierra mía (song)
- Melodía de arrabal (tango)
- Mi Buenos Aires querido (tango)
- Olvido
- Por tu boca roja
- Por una cabeza (tango)
- Quiéreme
- Recuerdo malevo (tango)
- Rubias de New York (foxtrot)
- Soledad (tango)
- Suerte negra (waltz)
- Sus ojos se cerraron (tango)
- Viejos tiempos (tango)
- Volver (tango)
- Volvió una noche (tango)

== Selected filmography ==
- Suburban Melody (1933)
- The Tango on Broadway (1934)
- Downward Slope (1934)
