= Suburban Melody =

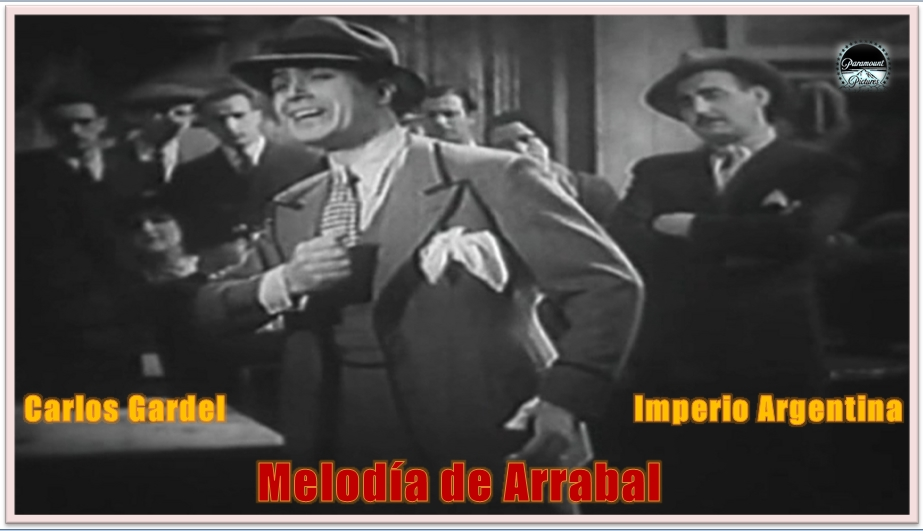
- Directed by: Louis J. Gasnier
- Written by: Alfredo Le Pera
- Starring: Carlos Gardel; Imperio Argentina; Vicente Padula
- Cinematography: Harry Stradling Sr.
- Music by: Marcel Lattès; Raoul Moretti; Horacio Pettorossi; Modesto Romero Martinez; José Sentis; Alberto Castellanos
- Production company: Paramount Pictures
- Distributed by: Paramount Pictures
- Release date: April 5, 1933
- Running time: 94 minutes
- Country: United States
- Language: Spanish

Suburban Melody (Spanish: Melodía de arrabal) is a 1933 American pre-Code musical film directed by Louis J. Gasnier and starring Imperio Argentina, Carlos Gardel and Vicente Padula.

The film was made at the Joinville Studios in Paris by Paramount Pictures, who produced a large number of films in different languages at the studios. The film was made in Spanish, primarily for release in Spanish-speaking countries. Carlos Gardel appeared in a string of such productions during the 1930s. The film was extremely popular in Argentina, the native country of its three stars, where it was one of the highest-grossing releases.

== Synopsis ==
After she hears his voice, a music teacher encourages a gambler to pursue a career as a professional singer. He enjoys success, but his former criminal connections threaten to wreck his progress.

== Cast ==
- Imperio Argentina as Alina
- Carlos Gardel as Roberto Ramírez
- Vicente Padula as Gutiérrez
- Jaime Devesa as Rancales
- Helena D'Algy as Marga

== Bibliography ==
- Bentley, Bernard. A Companion to Spanish Cinema. Boydell & Brewer, 2008.
- Finkielman, Jorge. The Film Industry in Argentina: An Illustrated Cultural History. McFarland, 2003.
- Nataša Durovicová, Kathleen E. Newman. World Cinemas, Transnational Perspectives. Routledge, 2010.
