= The Lights of Buenos Aires =

1931 film

- Directed by: Adelqui Millar
- Written by: Luis Bayón Herrera; Manuel Romero
- Starring: Carlos Gardel; Sofía Bozán; Pedro Quartucci; Gloria Guzmán; Manuel Kuindós
- Cinematography: Theodore J. Pahle
- Music by: Gerardo Matos Rodríguez
- Production company: Paramount Pictures
- Distributed by: Paramount Pictures
- Release date: September 23, 1931
- Running time: 85 minutes
- Countries: Argentina; United States
- Language: Spanish

The Lights of Buenos Aires (Spanish: Luces de Buenos Aires) is a 1931 American-Argentine tango comedy film directed by Adelqui Millar. It was made at the Joinville Studios in Paris, where Paramount Pictures concentrated its foreign-language production during the early 1930s.

== Cast ==
- Carlos Gardel as Anselmo
- Sofía Bozán as Elvira del Solar
- Gloria Guzmán as Rosita
- Pedro Quartucci as Pablo Soler
- Carlos Martínez Baena as Empresario
- Manuel Kuindós as Alberto Villamil
- Marita Ángeles as Lily
- Vicente Padula as Ciriaco
- Jorge Infante as Romualdo
- José Argüelles as Secretario

== See also ==
- Golden Age of Argentine cinema
- List of works by Manuel Romero
