= Carlos Gardel =

Argentine singer, songwriter, actor and tango artist (1890–1935)

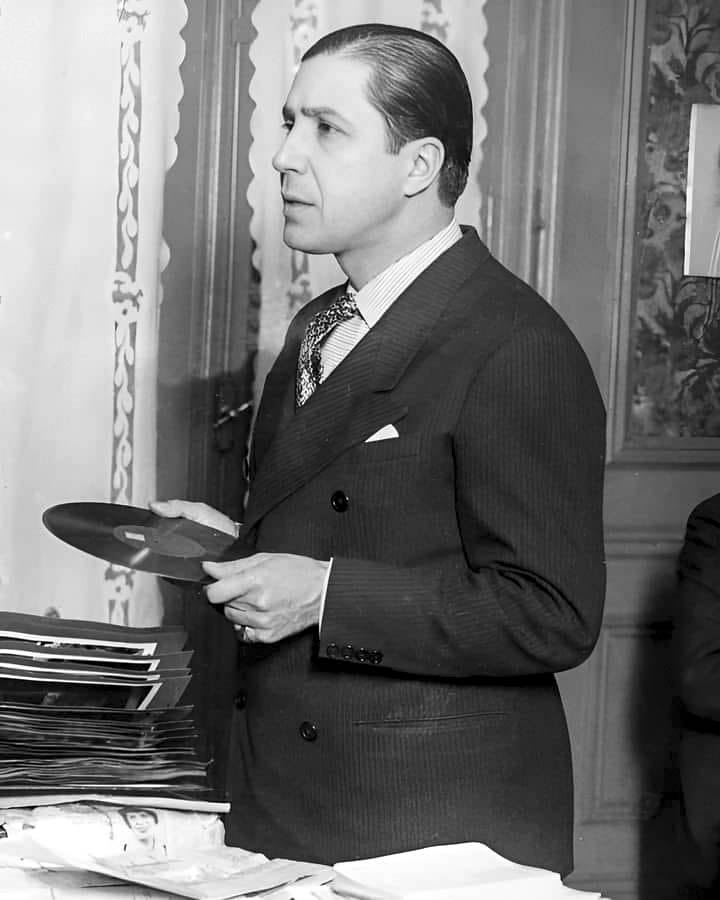
- Gardel at his house in Buenos Aires, 1933

Background information
- Born: Charles Romuald Gardès; 11 December 1890; Toulouse, France
- Origin: Buenos Aires, Argentina
- Died: 24 June 1935 (aged 44) Medellín, Colombia
- Genre: Tango
- Occupation: Singer-songwriter
- Years active: 1917–1935

Carlos Gardel (born Charles Romuald Gardès; 11 December 1890 – 24 June 1935) was a French-born Argentine singer, composer and actor, and the most prominent figure in the history of tango. He was one of the most influential interpreters of popular music in the first half of the 20th century. Gardel is the most famous tango singer of all time and is recognized throughout the world. Described variously as a baritone or tenor because of his wide vocal range, he was known for his rich voice and dramatic phrasing. Together with lyricist and long-time collaborator Alfredo Le Pera, Gardel wrote several classic tangos.

Gardel died in an airplane crash at the height of his career, becoming an archetypal tragic hero mourned throughout Latin America. For many, Gardel embodies the soul of the tango style. He is commonly referred to as "Carlitos", "El Zorzal" ("The Song Thrush"), "The King of Tango", "El Mago" ("The Wizard"), "El Morocho del Abasto" ("The Brunette Boy from Abasto"), and ironically "El Mudo" ("The Mute").

In 1967, a controversial theory was published by Uruguayan writer Erasmo Silva Cabrera, asserting that Gardel was born in Tacuarembó, Uruguay. Other authors expanded upon this theory, and a museum to Gardel was established in Tacuarembó. But Gardel's friends and family all knew him as a French immigrant from Toulouse. Scholarly researchers analyzed the contradictory evidence, especially French birth and baptismal records, and confirmed his birthplace as Toulouse.

== Biography ==
=== Early life ===
Gardel was born at the Hôpital de La Grave in Toulouse, France, to unmarried 25-year-old laundress Berthe Gardès, at about 2 am on 11 December 1890. The birth was recorded at the hospital, witnessed by the mid-wife Jenny Bazin. Later that day, the infant was baptized and registered with the Archdiocese of Toulouse under the name Charles Romuald Gardès. The father of the baby boy was listed on his birth certificate as "unknown", but 11 days later Berthe Gardès signed a statement establishing the baby's father as Paul Laserre, a married man who left Toulouse a few months before the baby was born. Berthe Gardès also left Toulouse, a little over a year later, likely to escape the social stigma of having a child born out of wedlock. In early 1893 in Bordeaux, France, mother and son boarded the ship SS Don Pedro and sailed to Buenos Aires, arriving on 11 March 1893. Berthe Gardès had her passport recorded upon arrival; she told immigration authorities that she was a widow. The two-year-old boy was recorded as Charles Gardès.

Gardel's mother settled at the western edge of the central San Nicolás district of Buenos Aires, at Calle Uruguay 162. She worked two blocks away on Calle Montevideo, pressing clothes in the French style, which commanded a relatively high price in the fashion-conscious city. Gardel grew up speaking Spanish, not French, with friends and family calling him Carlos, the Spanish version of his French name, and often by the familiar diminutive form Carlitos.

Some time after 1918, Laserre traveled from France to Buenos Aires to ask Berthe Gardès, now called Doña Berta, whether she would like to legitimize her son by marrying Laserre. This would have disrupted her story about being a widow. Gardel told his mother that if she did not need this man in her life, neither did he, closing the matter with "I don't even wish to see him." By this time Gardès had already altered his surname to the more Spanish-sounding Gardel.

=== Career ===
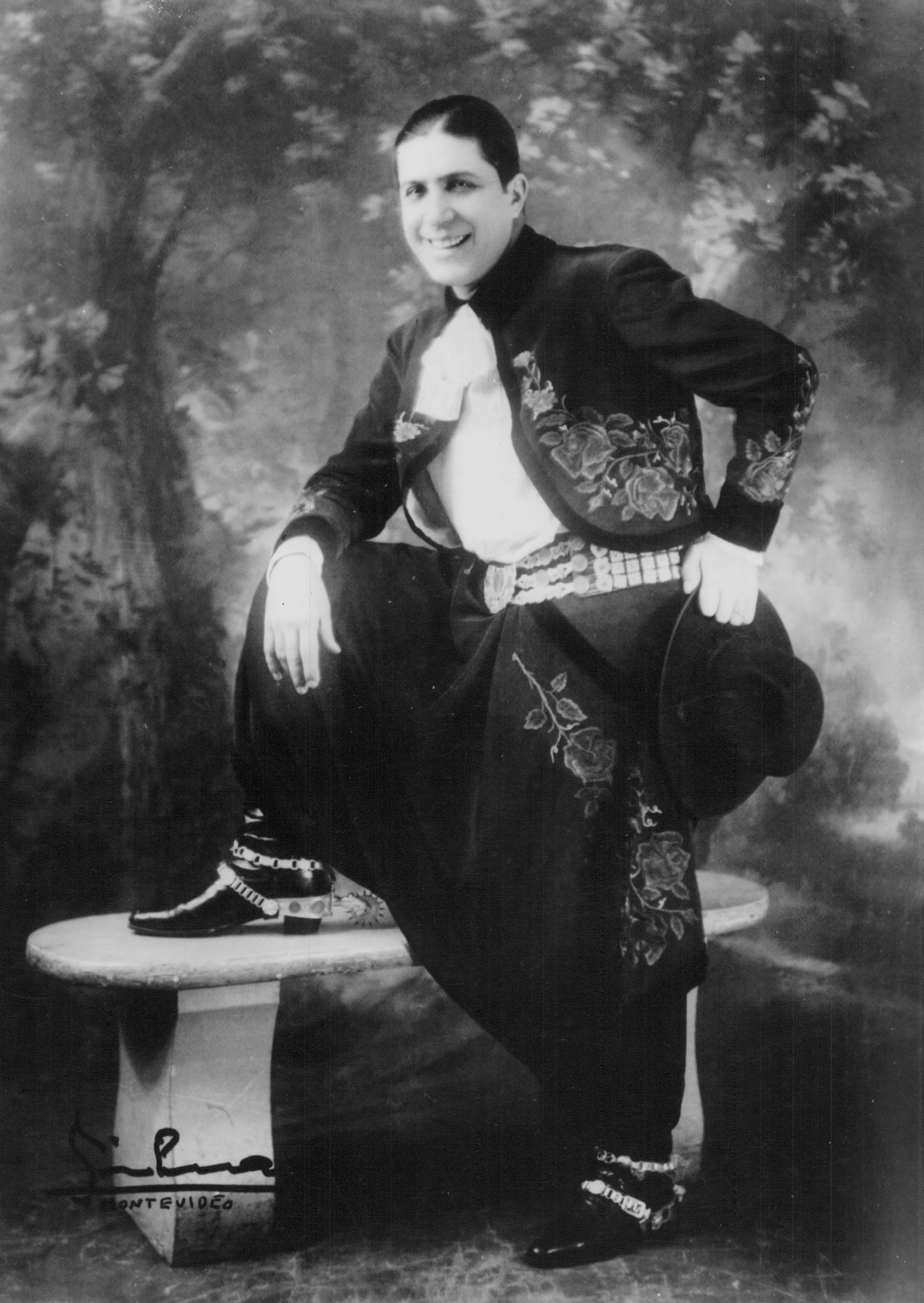
Portrait of Gardel, 1923

Gardel began his singing career in bars and at private parties. He also sang with Francisco Martino and later in a trio with Martino and José Razzano. Gardel created the tango-canción in 1917 with his rendition of Pascual Contursi and Samuel Castriota's Mi noche triste. The recording sold 10,000 copies and was a hit throughout Latin America.

Gardel went on tour through Argentina, Uruguay, Chile, Brazil, Puerto Rico, Venezuela and Colombia, as well as making appearances in Paris, New York, Barcelona and Madrid. He sold 70,000 records in the first three months of a 1928 visit to Paris. As his popularity grew, he made a number of films for Paramount in France and the U.S. While sentimental films such as Cuesta abajo (1934) and El día que me quieras (1935) lack lasting dramatic value, they were outstanding showcases of his tremendous singing talents and movie star looks.

=== Romantic life ===
Gardel was aware of the fact that much of his popularity was based on his attractiveness to women. In an effort to seem as if he were available to any woman, he sought to keep his love life secret. Gardel had one major girlfriend in his life: Isabel del Valle. He met del Valle in late 1920 when she was fourteen years of age. At the time, he was performing at the Esmeralda Theater in Buenos Aires. They were close for more than a decade. Gardel and del Valle were not seen together very often in public. Gardel's mother and del Valle's family helped make sure the relationship was not well known. Only Gardel's closest friends knew about it.

Gardel arranged for del Valle to have a house; he provided money for her to live on. Around 1930 the relationship began to degrade. Gardel had his lawyer stop making payments to del Valle, who later married another man and moved to Uruguay. She was always respectful of the memory of Gardel, even when interviewed about him in late life for a 1980s television program.

=== Death ===
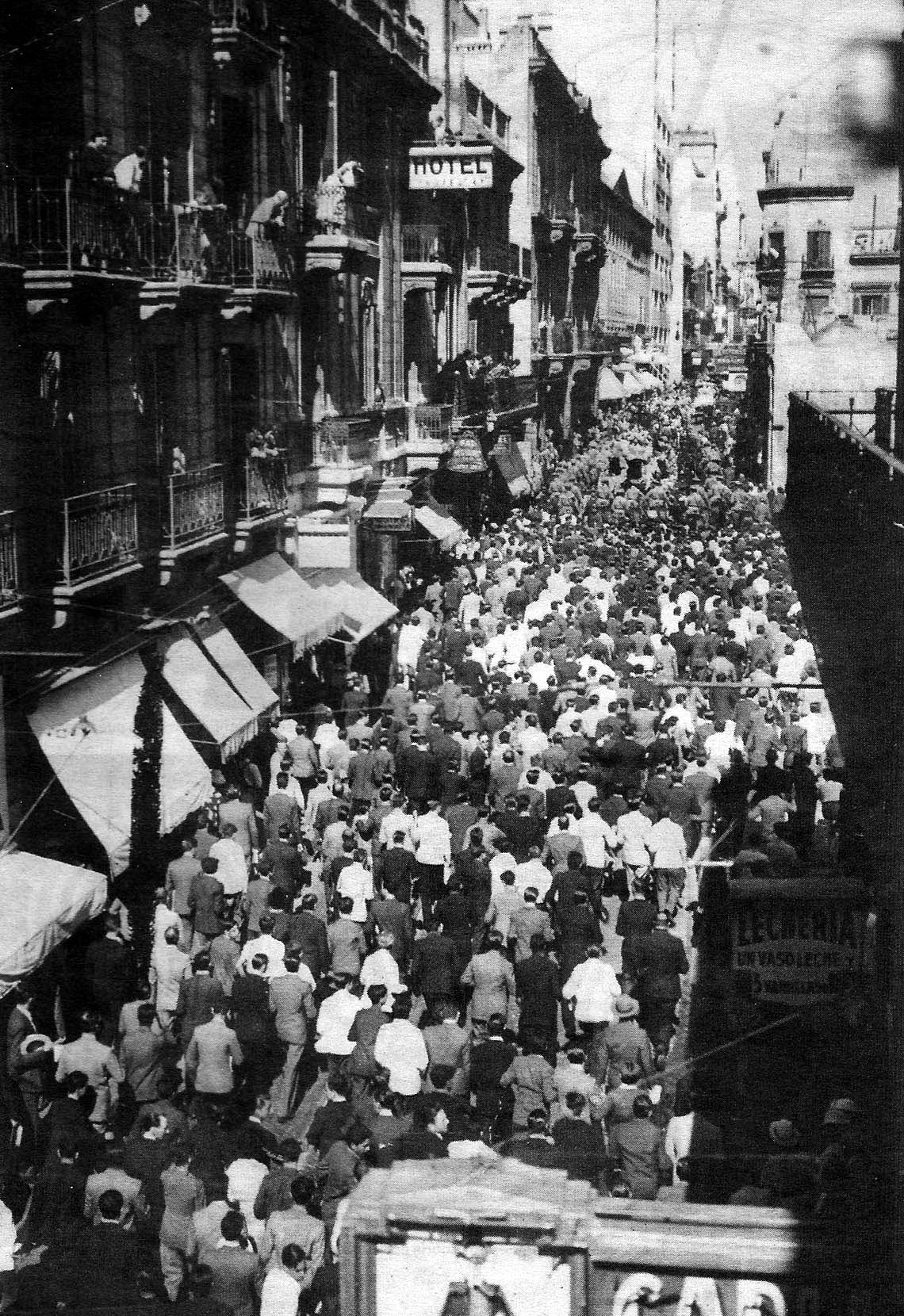
The coffin of Gardel moves down Florida Street in Buenos Aires

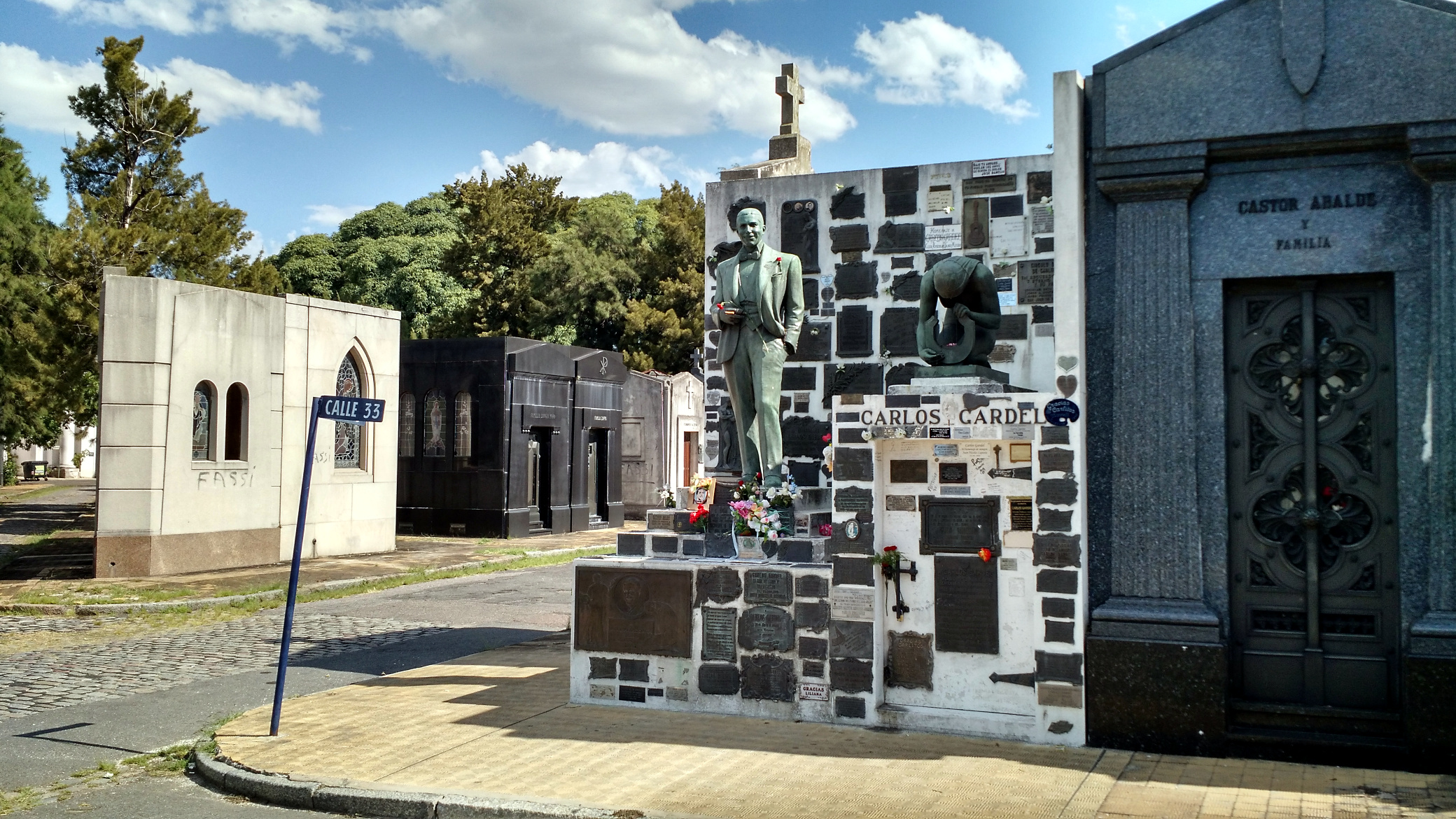
Carlos Gardel's grave at La Chacarita Cemetery

Gardel died on 24 June 1935 in a crash between two Ford Trimotor transport aircraft at Olaya Herrera Airfield, Medellín, Colombia. Others who died included the pilot Ernesto Samper, lyricist Alfredo Le Pera, guitarists Guillermo Barbieri and Ángel Domingo Riverol, several business associates, and other friends of the group. A third guitarist, José María Aguilar Porrás, suffered severe injuries.

Millions of Gardel's fans throughout Latin America went into mourning. Hordes came to pay their respects as his body was taken from Colombia through New York City and Rio de Janeiro. Thousands rendered homage during the two days he lay in state in Montevideo, the city in which his mother lived at the time. Gardel's body was laid to rest in La Chacarita Cemetery in Buenos Aires.

== Birthplace controversy ==
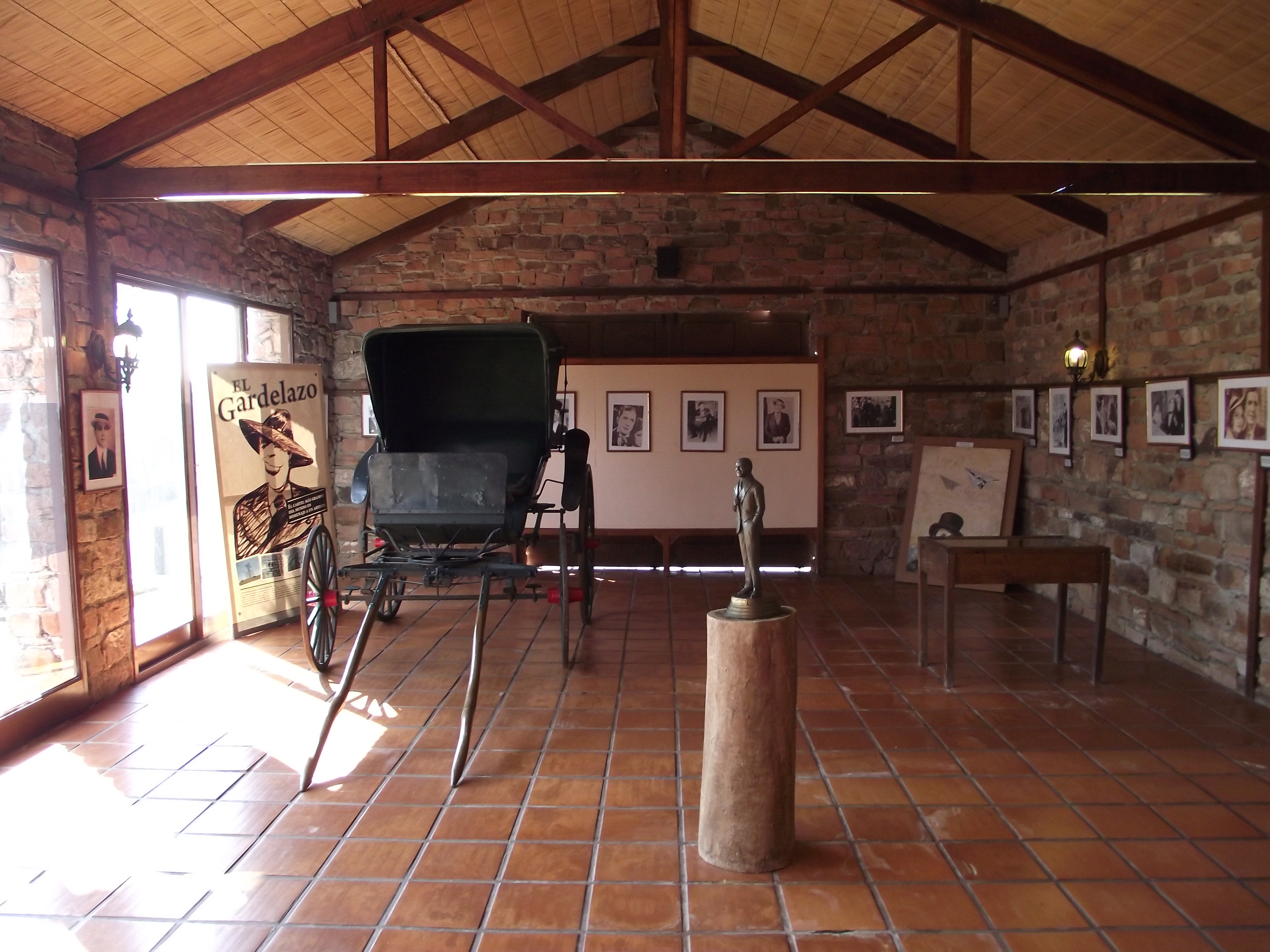
Museo Carlos Gardel, a museum about the artist, located in Valle Edén, Tacuarembó

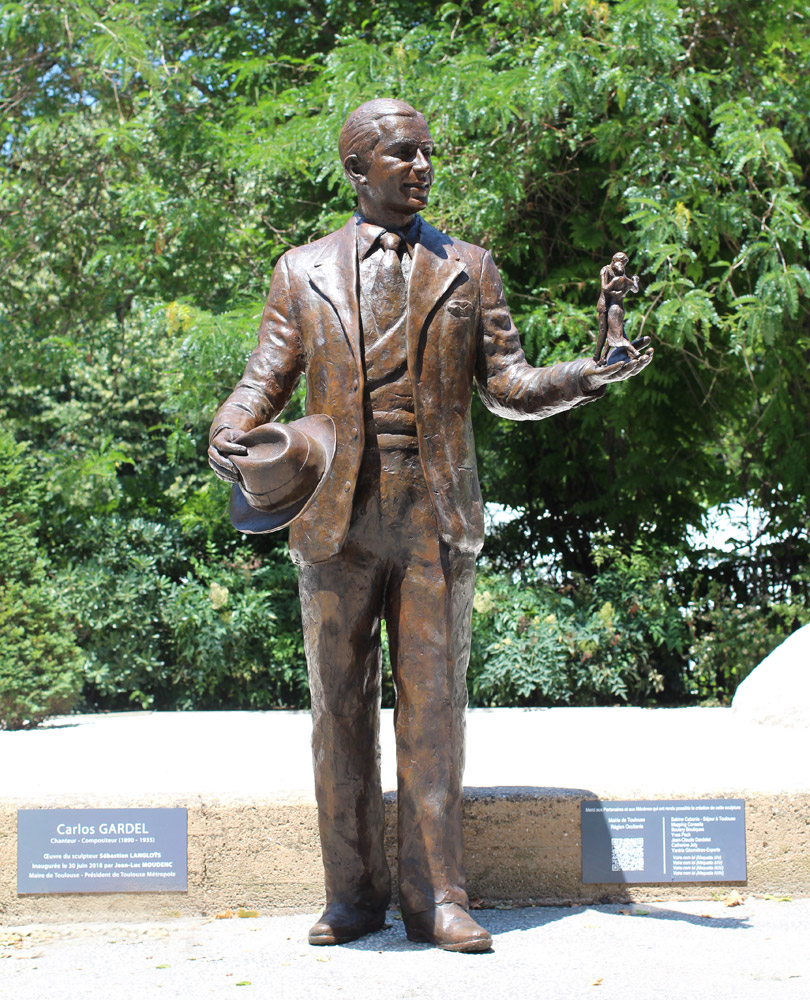
Statue of Carlos Gardel in Toulouse

The place and year of Gardel's birth was a controversy that provoked debate; Toulouse, France, in 1890 was the most widely accepted version for many years. The Toulouse birthplace was confirmed in 2012 with the location of his birth certificate. Scholars such as Vanderbilt University history professor Simon Collier, University of Belgrano agriculture history professor Osvaldo Barsky and Uruguayan history professor Jorge Ruffinelli from Stanford University write about how Gardel was born in Toulouse, France, in 1890, and how he laid a false trail about his birthplace beginning in 1920, when he was almost 30.

In October 1920, Gardel first applied for Uruguayan citizenship; in Buenos Aires, he went to the Uruguayan consulate to complete paperwork that said he was born in 1887 in Tacuarembó, Uruguay. One month later, he was issued a new Argentine identity card that listed him as a Uruguayan national. On 7 March 1923, he applied for citizenship in Argentina. On 1 May 1923, he took the oath of Argentine citizenship. Today, there is no absolute certainty regarding why he took these steps. The most likely reason for this act was to avoid problems with French authorities during an upcoming tour of France. As a French citizen by birth, Gardel had been required to register with the French military during the Great War. It is likely that Gardel never registered; his name is not found on any lists of registrants. Uruguay maintained a neutrality policy during the war, so Gardel probably chose Uruguayan citizenship on that basis.

In 1967, writer Erasmo Silva Cabrera started the modern dispute over Gardel's birthplace when he published arguments describing Gardel as having been born in Tacuarembó, Uruguay. Nelson Bayardo wrote a similar book in 1988. In 1990, Eduardo Payssé González published a book containing many biographical details supporting a birthplace of Tacuarembó. The story is that Gardel was born in 1887 the son of influential Uruguayan landowner Carlos Escayola and Escayola's sister-in-law, 13-year-old Maria Lelia Oliva. The unwanted boy, named Carlos, was offered to Bertha Gardes who was passing through the area on a cabaret dance tour. Gardes took the boy back to France, where she was from. Later, she and the boy traveled again, this time to Buenos Aires, where they settled. This version of events conflicts with scholarly accounts describing Gardes as an ordinary woman who ironed and pressed clothing in Toulouse in 1890, not a touring dancer.

After Gardel's death, his legal representative, Armando Defino, produced a handwritten will which he said was written by Gardel himself, stating he was born in Toulouse, France, to Berthe Gardes (1865–1943), and baptized with the name of Charles Romuald Gardes. This statement agrees with the original birth certificate registered in Toulouse on 11 December 1890.

In his youth in Buenos Aires, Gardel's group of close friends called him "El francesito" (Frenchie), acknowledging his French origin. After 1920, Gardel gave contradictory and evasive stories about his birthplace, most likely because of the false papers he had filed. Reporters often wrote that Gardel was Uruguayan, born in Tacuarembó. In the newspaper El Telégrafo (Paysandú, Uruguay, 25 October 1933), Gardel was reported as saying, "I'm Uruguayan, born in Tacuarembó". In the June 1935 issue of Caretas magazine of Antioquia, Colombia, Gardel was reported as saying, "My heart is Argentine, but my soul is Uruguayan, because that is where I was born". In 1931, Gardel wrote in a witnessed document, "I am French, born in Toulouse, 11 December 1890, son of Berthe Gardes."

== Compositions ==
Gardel wrote the music and Alfredo Le Pera the lyrics for the following compositions:

- Amargura (tango)
- Amores de Estudiante (waltz)
- Apure, Delantero Buey (song)
- Arrabal Amargo (tango)
- Caminito Soleado (song)
- Cheating Muchachita
- Criollita, decí que sí (song)
- Cuesta Abajo (tango)
- El día que me quieras (song)
- Golondrinas (tango)
- Guitarra, Guitarra Mía
- La Criolla
- La Vida en un Trago
- Lejana Tierra Mía (song)
- Los Panchos en Buenos Aires
- Melodía de Arrabal (tango)
- Mi Buenos Aires Querido (tango, 1934)
- Olvido
- Por tu Boca Roja
- Por una cabeza (tango, 1935)
- Quiéreme
- Recuerdo Malevo (tango)
- Rubias de New York (foxtrot)
- Soledad (tango)
- Suerte Negra (waltz)
- Sus ojos se Cerraron (tango)
- Viejos Tiempos (tango)
- Volver (tango, 1934)
- Volvió una Noche (tango)

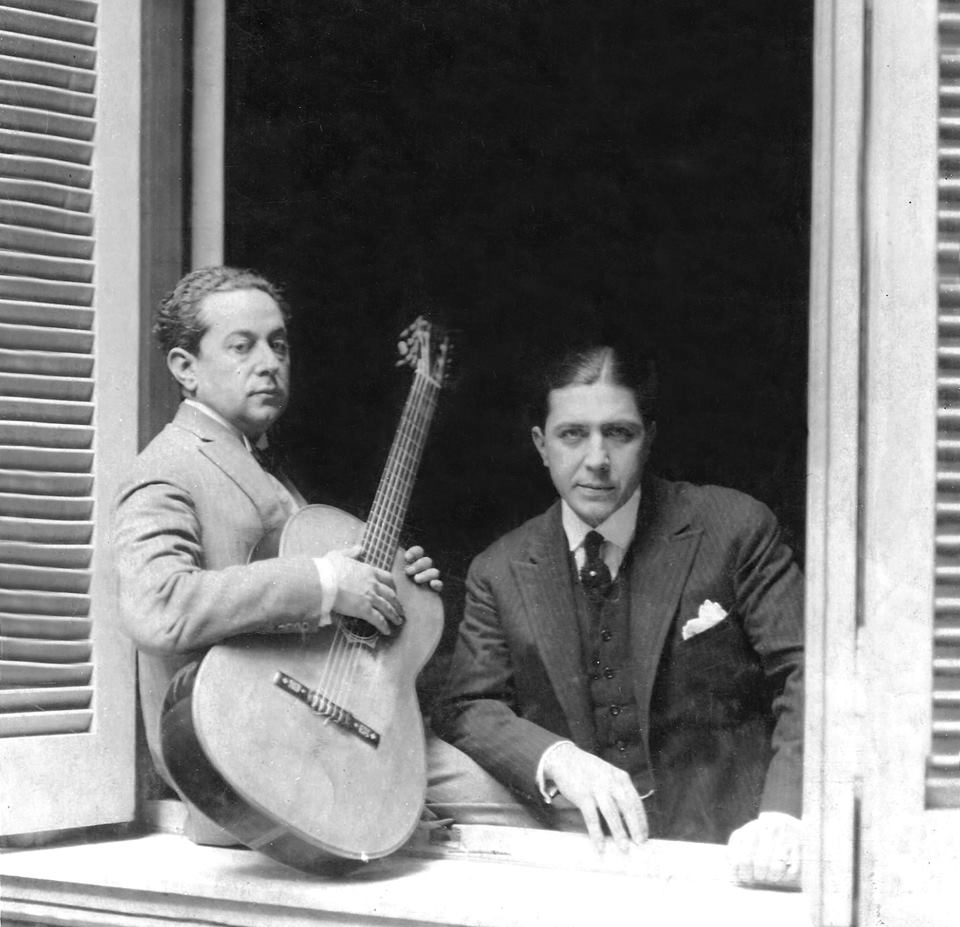
José Razzano (left) and Gardel in Gardel's mother's house, 1926

== Filmography ==
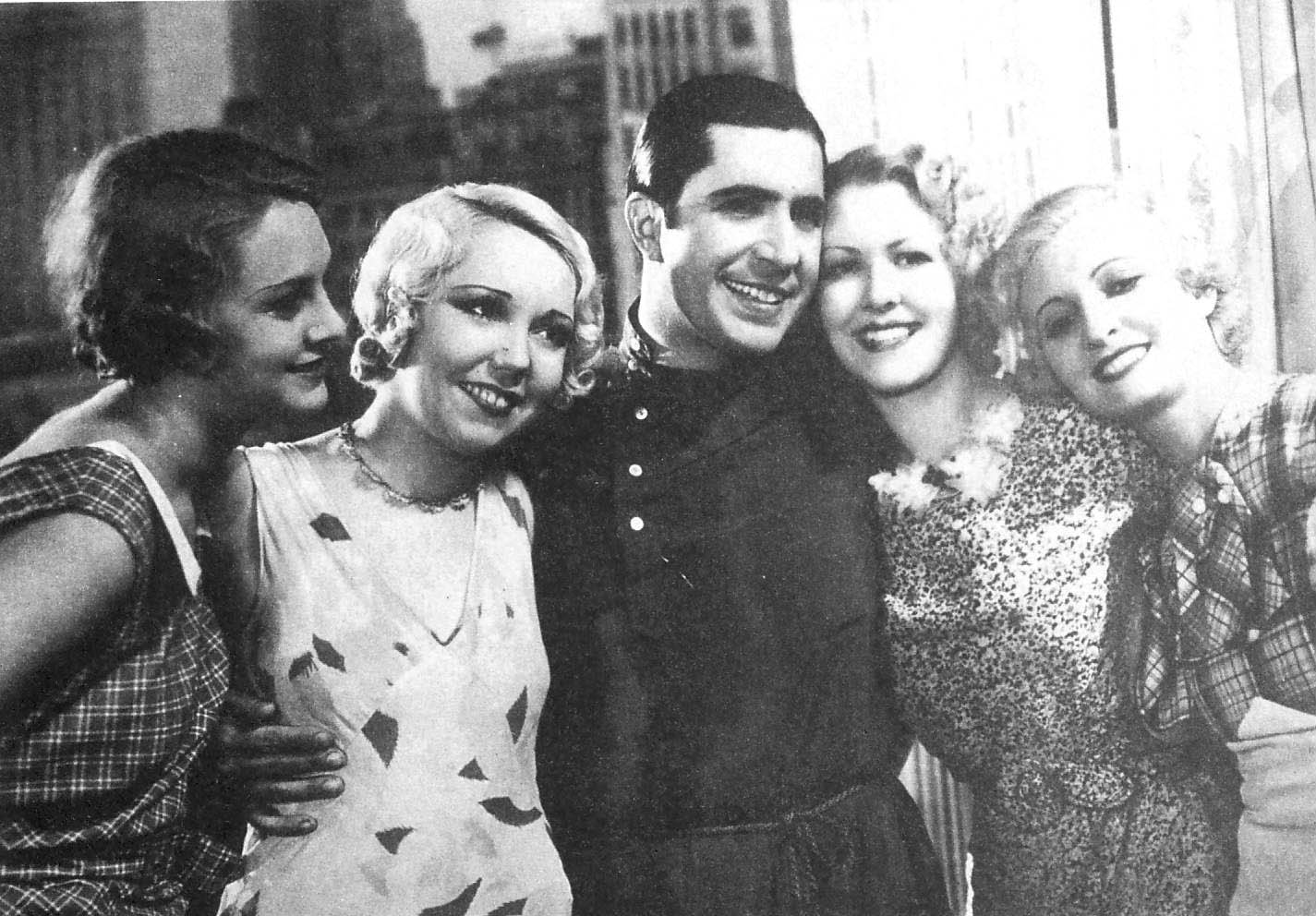
Gardel in New York promoting 1934's El Tango en Broadway

- Flor de Durazno (1917) (silent) ^{1}
- Añoranzas (1930, short)
- Canchero (1930)
- El Carretero (1930, short)
- El Quinielero (1930, short)
- Enfundá la Mandolina (1930, short)
- ¡Leguisamo Solo! (1930, short)
- Mano a Mano (1930, short)
- Padrino Pelado (1930, short)
- Tengo Miedo (1930)
- Viejo Smoking (1930, short)
- Yira, Yira (1930, short)
- The Lights of Buenos Aires (1931) (filmed in Paris)
- Esperame (1932)
- La Casa es Seria (1932)
- Suburban Melody (1933)
- Downward Slope (1934)
- The Tango on Broadway (1934)
- El día que me quieras (1935)
- Cazadores de Estrellas (1935)
- Tango Bar (1935)

Notes:

- ^{1} Gardel's first film, directed by Francisco Defilippis Novoa and made in collaboration with Celestino Petray.

== Legacy ==
Gardel's legacy is intimately tied with the tango. For his tango singing, Gardel is still revered from Tokyo to Buenos Aires. He is widely regarded as one of Argentina's foremost cultural icons; in Buenos Aires, his likeness appears on murals, storefronts, and public spaces across the city. A popular saying in Argentina, which serves as a testimony to his long-lived popularity, claims, "Gardel sings better every day." Another commonly used phrase in Argentina (and some other Latin American countries) which asserts that Veinte años no es nada (Twenty years is nothing), comes from his song Volver (1934). Another common Argentine phrase is soy/sos Gardel y Le Pera (I'm/You are Gardel and Le Pera) referring to the greatness of both; used when somebody excels at something. Gardel has been posthumously inducted into the International Latin Music Hall of Fame in 2000 and the Latin Songwriters Hall of Fame in 2014.

In the neighborhood of Abasto, Buenos Aires, the Carlos Gardel Museum opened in 2003, in a house that Gardel bought for his mother in 1927, and where he also lived from 1927 to 1933. Another Carlos Gardel Museum opened in 1999 in Valle Edén, an old farm site 23 km (14 mi) south of Tacuarembó, Uruguay.

Medellín, Colombia is home to a small house museum dedicated to his memory, Casa Gardeliana, as well as a neighbourhood and a Metroplús station named after him. His life and work continue to be widely celebrated in the city, as reflected in its numerous venues for listening to and dancing tango. An order of merit recognising contributions to the arts, culture and literature also bears his name and is awarded by the Great Masonic Lodge of Antioquia.

=== In literature ===
António Lobo Antunes wrote a novel entitled The Death of Carlos Gardel, in which one of the characters believes that Gardel did not die in the plane crash in 1935.

Gardel appears as a fictionalized character in the play El día que me quieras (1979) by the Venezuelan writer José Ignacio Cabrujas.

=== In film ===
In the 1939 biopic The Life of Carlos Gardel, he is portrayed by Hugo del Carril.

Doble o Nada starring Dario Grandinetti and Aitana Sánchez-Gijón was released by Maverick in April 2003. It is a fictional story about a struggling Argentine tango singer who looks and sings like Gardel, and a woman admirer of Gardel, who encounters Franchi.

=== Stamps ===
Over the years, Argentina has issued several postal stamps honoring Gardel. In 1976 and again in 2004, Uruguay produced Gardel stamps, with Uruguay calling him the "immortal Tacuaremboan" in the 2004 version. In 1985, on the 50th anniversary of his death, Colombia produced a Gardel stamp which featured the singer and the airplane model that caused his death. On 16 March 2011, the United States Postal Service issued a set of five "Latin Music Legends" stamps including one picturing Carlos Gardel.

== See also ==
- List of tango singers
