= Let's Dance (Slovak TV series) season 6 =

Series of Dancing Competition on television

Let's Dance
- Season 6
- Presented by: Martin "Pyco" Rausch; Adela Banášová
- Judges: Petr Horáček; Tatiana Drexler; Zuzana Fialová; Ján Ďurovčík
- Celebrity winner: Vladimír Kobielsky
- Professional winner: Dominika Chrapeková
- No. of episodes: 10

Release
- Original network: Markíza
- Original release: 3 September – 5 November 2017

Series chronology
- ← Previous; Season 5 Next → Season 7

Let's Dance aired its sixth series on Markíza from 3 September 2017 to 5 November 2017 after 6 years hiatus. The series was presented by Martin "Pyco" Rausch and Adela Banášová. The judging panel consisted of Petr Horáček who replaced the late Jozef Bednárik, Tatiana Drexler, Zuzana Fialová and Ján Ďurovčík.

On 5 November 2017, actor Vladimír Kobielsky and Dominika Chrapeková were announced as the winners, while actor Branislav Deák and Dominika Rošková finished as the runners-up and former Miss Czechoslovakia 1993 Silvia Lakatošová and David Schavel finished in third place.

== Format ==
The couples dance each week in a live show. The judges score each performance out of ten. After all the couples have danced they are then ranked according to the judges' scores and given points according to their rank, with the highest ranked couple receiving a number of points equal to the number of couples dancing that week e.g. 7 points where there are seven couples dancing. When there are no tied scores the lowest scored couple will receive one point. However, in the event of a tie where two or more couples obtain the same judges score, the couple below those in the tie will be awarded one point below the points awarded to each of the tied couples. So, for example, if two couples obtain the same rank and obtain 7 points each, the couple immediately below them will be awarded 6 points. When couples are ranked equally by the judges the scoring of all other couples underneath will follow in the same descending order. Should there be any tied scores the lowest scored couple will therefore receive more than one point from the judges scores. The public are also invited to vote for their favourite couples, and the couples are ranked again according to the number of votes they receive, again receiving points; The couple with the most votes receiving the most points. Again in the unlikely event of a tie in the public vote the points are awarded in the same way as the points from the judges score.

From week 5: the points for judges' score and public vote are then added together, and the two couples with the fewest points are placed in the bottom two. If two couples have equal points, the points from the public vote are given precedence. As with the previous series, the bottom two couples have to perform a dance-off on the results show. Based on that performance alone, each judge then votes on which couple should stay and which couple should leave. For the first time in the show's history, the casting vote was not made solely by the head judge in the dance-off and was instead rotated, with a different judge making the decision each week.

== Couples ==
The eleven couples featuring selected celebrities and their dancing partners:

Celebrity	Occupation / Known for	Dance partner	Status
Peter Varinský	Sports News host	Paulína Gašparíková	Eliminated 1st on September 10, 2017
Tomáš "Yxo" Dohňanský	Bass guitarist	Katarína Lacková	Eliminated 2nd on September 17, 2017
Daniela Hantuchová	Tennis player	Erik Ňarjaš	Eliminated 3rd on September 24, 2017
Petra Vajdová	Actress	Fabio Bellucci	Withdrew on October 8, 2017
Michal Konrád	Chef	Patrícia Martinovičová	Eliminated 5th on October 8, 2017
Lenka Vavrinčíková	Newsreader	Adam Brešťanský	Eliminated 6th on October 15, 2017
Emma Drobná	Winner of SuperStar 2015	Filip Buranský	Eliminated 7th on October 22, 2017
Eva "Evelyn" Kramerová	Comedian, actress	Lukáš Hojdan	Eliminated 8th on October 29, 2017
Silvia Lakatošová	Miss Czechoslovakia 1993	David Schavel	Third Place on November 5, 2017
Branislav Deák	Actor	Dominika Rošková	Runner-up on November 5, 2017
Vladimír Kobielsky	Actor	Dominika Chrapeková	Winner on November 5, 2017

== Scoring chart ==
The highest score each week is indicated in bold green with a dagger (†), while the lowest score each week is indicated in italicized red with a double-dagger (‡).

Color key:

Winners
Runners-up
Third place
Bottom two
Eliminated
Withdrew from competition

Let's Dance (season 6) - Weekly scores
Couple	Pl.	Week										
Couple	Pl.	1	2	1+2	3	4	5	6	7	8	9	10
Vladimír & Dominika C.	1st	16	23	39	**34**†	22	33	28	38+35=**73**†	38+31=69	34+38=72	40+38=**78**†
Branislav & Dominika R.	2nd	24	22	46	27	25	**34**†	33	33+34=67	37+33=**70**†	36+40=**76**†	40+38=**78**†
Silvia & David	3rd	14	**27**†	41	26	26	31	**37**†	35+35=70	38+27=65	27+40=67	38+40=**78**†
Evelyn & Lukáš	4th	12	21	33	22	24	26	33	30+34=64	31+35=66	29+35=64‡	
Emma & Filip	5th	19	14‡	33	23	23	22‡	28	28+35=63	31+25=56‡		
Lenka & Adam	6th	18	14‡	32	25	31	26	31	28+34=62‡			
Michal & Patrícia	7th	16	14‡	30	24	19‡	26	23‡				
Petra & Fabio	8th	**27**†	23	**50**†	26	**33**†	32					
Daniela & Erik	9th	10‡	18	28‡	19	19‡						
Yxo & Katarína	10th	11	17	28‡	11‡							
Peter & Paulína	11th	17	14‡	31								

== Weekly scores ==
Unless indicated otherwise, individual judges scores in the charts below are given (in parentheses) in this order from left to right: Petr Horáček, Tatiana Drexler, Zuzana Fialová, Ján Ďurovčík.

=== Week 1 ===
Couples performed one unlearned routine, and are listed in the order they performed.

Couple	Scores	Dance	Music
Vladimír & Dominika C.	16 (4,4,5,3)	Cha-cha-cha	"You Should Be Dancing" — Bee Gees
Emma & Filip	19 (5,4,6,4)	Waltz	"Run to You" — Whitney Houston
Branislav & Dominika R.	24 (6,6,7,5)	Tango	"Sweet Dreams (Are Made of This)" — Eurythmics
Lenka & Adam	18 (4,5,6,3)	Jive	"Dear Future Husband" — Meghan Trainor
Yxo & Katarína	11 (3,2,5,1)	Tango	"You Give Love a Bad Name" — Bon Jovi
Evelyn & Lukáš	12 (3,3,4,2)	Cha-cha-cha	"Push It" — Salt-n-Pepa
Michal & Patrícia	16 (4,4,5,3)	Waltz	"When I Need You" — Leo Sayer
Silvia & David	14 (4,3,4,3)	Cha-cha-cha	"Express Yourself" — Madonna
Peter & Paulína	17 (4,4,6,3)	Jive	"Fun, Fun, Fun" — The Beach Boys
Daniela & Erik	10 (2,3,4,1)	Cha-cha-cha	"Shut Up and Dance" — Walk the Moon
Petra & Fabio	27 (7,7,8,5)	Tango	"Telephone" — Lady Gaga ft. Beyoncé

=== Week 2 ===
Couples performed one unlearned routine, and are listed in the order they performed.

Couple	Scores	Dance	Music	Result
Yxo & Katarína	17 (4,5,6,2)	Jive	"The Boy Does Nothing" — Alesha Dixon	Safe
Lenka & Adam	14 (4,3,4,3)	Viennese waltz	"Hopelessly Devoted to You" — Olivia Newton-John	Safe
Vladimír & Dominika C.	23 (6,6,7,4)	Charleston	"Puttin' On the Ritz" — Harry Richman	Safe
Emma & Filip	14 (3,3,5,3)	Cha-cha-cha	"Sugar" — Maroon 5	Safe
Peter & Paulína	14 (4,3,5,2)	Tango	"Summer" — Calvin Harris	Eliminated
Evelyn & Lukáš	21 (5,5,7,4)	Viennese waltz	"Where the Wild Roses Grow" — Nick Cave and the Bad Seeds & Kylie Minogue	Safe
Daniela & Erik	18 (4,4,6,4)	Tango	"Poker Face" — Lady Gaga	Safe
Petra & Fabio	23 (6,6,7,4)	Charleston	"We No Speak Americano" — Yolanda Be Cool	Safe
Branislav & Dominika R.	22 (5,6,7,4)	Cha-cha-cha	"Forget You" — CeeLo Green	Safe
Michal & Patrícia	14 (4,3,5,2)	Jive	"Jailhouse Rock" — Elvis Presley	Safe
Silvia & David	27 (7,7,8,5)	Tango	"El Tango de Roxanne" — The Police	Safe

=== Week 3: Movie Night ===
Couples performed one unlearned routine, and are listed in the order they performed.

Couple	Scores	Dance	Music	Movie	Result
Emma & Filip	23 (6,5,7,5)	Quickstep	"You've Got a Friend in Me"	Toy Story	Safe
Branislav & Dominika R.	27 (6,7,8,6)	Paso doble	"He's a Pirate"	Pirates of the Caribbean	Safe
Silvia & David	26 (7,6,7,6)	Viennese waltz	"Earned It"	Fifty Shades of Grey	Safe
Yxo & Katarína	11 (3,2,5,1)	Quickstep	"Hey! Pachuco"	The Mask	Eliminated
Michal & Patrícia	24 (6,7,8,3)	Viennese waltz	"You Don't Own Me"	Suicide Squad	Safe
Evelyn & Lukáš	22 (5,5,8,4)	Jive	"I'm a Believer"	Shrek	Safe
Daniela & Erik	19 (5,4,6,4)	Jive	"You Never Can Tell"	Pulp Fiction	Safe
Lenka & Adam	25 (6,6,8,5)	Charleston	"A Little Party Never Killed Nobody"	The Great Gatsby	Safe
Petra & Fabio	26 (5,7,8,6)	Rumba	"Skyfall"	Skyfall	Safe
Vladimír & Dominika C.	34 (9,9,9,7)	Waltz	"Love Theme from The Godfather"	The Godfather	Safe

=== Week 4 ===
Couples performed one unlearned routine, and are listed in the order they performed.

Couple	Scores	Dance	Music	Result
Silvia & David	26 (7,6,7,6)	Jive	"Runaway Baby" — Bruno Mars	Safe
Vladimír & Dominika C.	22 (6,7,5,4)	Salsa	"Despacito" — Luis Fonsi ft. Daddy Yankee	Safe
Daniela & Erik	19 (5,4,6,4)	Waltz	"Come Away with Me" — Norah Jones	Eliminated
Michal & Patrícia	19 (5,5,6,3)	Rumba	"Shape of You" — Ed Sheeran	Safe
Branislav & Dominika R.	25 (7,7,7,4)	Charleston	"Cabaret" — Liza Minnelli	Safe
Evelyn & Lukáš	24 (7,5,7,5)	Slowfox	"Big Spender" — Shirley Bassey	Safe
Petra & Fabio	33 (8,9,9,7)	Quickstep	"Diamonds Are a Girl's Best Friend" — Marilyn Monroe	Safe
Emma & Filip	23 (6,4,8,5)	Rumba	"Bleeding Love" — Leona Lewis	Safe
Lenka & Adam	31 (8,8,9,6)	Paso doble	"Malagueña" — Ernesto Lecuona	Safe

=== Week 5 ===
Couples performed one unlearned routine, and are listed in the order they performed.

Couple	Scores	Dance	Music	Result
Evelyn & Lukáš	26 (6,7,7,6)	Rumba	"The Way We Were" — Barbra Streisand	Safe
Michal & Patrícia	26 (7,6,7,6)	Charleston	"Do Your Thing" — Basement Jaxx	Safe
Branislav & Dominika R.	34 (9,9,9,7)	Rumba	"I Don't Want to Miss a Thing" — Aerosmith	Safe
Lenka & Adam	26 (6,7,7,6)	Rumba	"Love Me like You Do" — Ellie Goulding	Eliminated
Vladimír & Dominika C.	33 (8,8,9,8)	Viennese waltz	"Somebody to Love" — Queen	Safe
Silvia & David	31 (8,8,8,7)	Slowfox	"I Say a Little Prayer" — Dionne Warwick	Bottom two
Emma & Filip	22 (6,5,6,5)	Viennese waltz	"Have You Ever Really Loved a Woman?" — Bryan Adams	Safe
Petra & Fabio	32 (8,7,10,7)	Salsa	"Fireball" — Pitbull	Safe

Judges' votes to save

- Horáček: Silvia & David
- Drexler: Silvia & David
- Fialová: Lenka & Adam
- Ďurovčík: Silvia & David

=== Week 6 ===
Couples performed one unlearned routine, and are listed in the order they performed.

Petra Vajdová withdrew from the competition due to a leg injury — specifically a torn muscle — which happened during training. Lenka Vavrinčíková, who had been eliminated in the previous round, returned to the competition.

Couple	Scores	Dance	Music	Result
Silvia & David	37 (10,9,10,8)	Quickstep	"You're the One That I Want" — Grease	Safe
Vladimír & Dominika C.	28 (7,6,8,7)	Jive	"Austin's Theme" — Austin Powers	Bottom two
Evelyn & Lukáš	33 (8,7,10,8)	Argentine tango	"Cell Block Tango" — Chicago	Safe
Michal & Patrícia	23 (6,5,7,5)	Cha-cha-cha	"Gangnam Style" — Psy	Eliminated
Branislav & Dominika R.	33 (9,9,8,7)	Samba	"You Should Be Dancing" — Bee Gees	Safe
Lenka & Adam	31 (8,8,8,7)	Viennese waltz	"Planetarium" — La La Land	Safe
Emma & Filip	28 (7,6,9,6)	Salsa	"(I've Had) The Time of My Life" — Dirty Dancing	Safe

Judges' votes to save

- Horáček: Vladimír & Dominika C.
- Drexler: Vladimír & Dominika C.
- Fialová: Vladimír & Dominika C.
- Ďurovčík: Did not vote

=== Week 7 ===
Couples performed one unlearned routine and groupe dance, and are listed in the order they performed.

Couple	Scores	Dance	Music	Result
Emma & Filip	28 (7,7,8,6)	Slowfox	"Grace Kelly" — Mika	Bottom two
Silvia & David	35 (9,9,9,8)	Paso doble	"Free Your Mind" — En Vogue	Safe
Evelyn & Lukáš	30 (8,8,8,6)	Salsa	"Conga" — Miami Sound Machine	Safe
Vladimír & Dominika C.	38 (10,10,9,9)	Argentine tango	"Tanguera" — Mariano Mores	Safe
Lenka & Adam	28 (7,6,8,7)	Samba	"Magalenha" — Carlinhos Brown	Eliminated
Branislav & Dominika R.	33 (8,8,10,7)	Slowfox	"Take Me to Church" — Hozier	Safe
Silvia & David	35 (9,9,10,7)	Tango	"Toccata" — David Garrett	
Emma & Filip	35 (9,9,10,7)	Tango	"Toccata" — David Garrett	
Vladimír & Dominika C.	35 (9,9,10,7)	Tango	"Toccata" — David Garrett	
Evelyn & Lukáš	34 (8,8,10,8)	Jive	"Proud Mary" — Ike & Tina Turner	
Lenka & Adam	34 (8,8,10,8)	Jive	"Proud Mary" — Ike & Tina Turner	
Branislav & Dominika R.	34 (8,8,10,8)	Jive	"Proud Mary" — Ike & Tina Turner	

Judges' votes to save

- Horáček: Emma & Filip
- Drexler: Emma & Filip
- Fialová: Emma & Filip
- Ďurovčík: Did not vote

=== Week 8 ===
Couples performed two unlearned routine, and are listed in the order they performed.

Couple	Trio partner	Scores	Dance	Music	Result
Silvia & David	Fabio Belluci	38 (10,9,10,9)	Waltz	"Kissing You" — Des'ree	Bottom two
Silvia & David	Fabio Belluci	27 (7,6,8,6)	Salsa	"Turn the Beat Around" — Gloria Estefan	Bottom two
Vladimír & Dominika C.	Katarína Lacková	38 (9,10,10,9)	Quickstep	"Zima na saniach" — Michal Dočolomanský	Safe
Vladimír & Dominika C.	Katarína Lacková	31 (8,8,8,7)	Paso doble	"Explosive" — David Garrett	Safe
Emma & Filip	Tomáš Tanka	31 (7,8,9,7)	Tango	"Hold Back the River" — James Bay	Eliminated
Emma & Filip	Tomáš Tanka	25 (6,6,8,5)	Samba	"Hot in Herre" — Nelly	Eliminated
Branislav & Dominika R.	Paulína Gašparíková	37 (9,10,10,8)	Viennese waltz	"Pokoj v duši" — Jana Kirschner	Safe
Branislav & Dominika R.	Paulína Gašparíková	33 (9,9,8,7)	Jive	"Hit the Road Jack" — Ray Charles	Safe
Evelyn & Lukáš	Adam Brešťanský	31 (8,8,8,7)	Quickstep	"Candyman" — Christina Aguilera	Safe
Evelyn & Lukáš	Adam Brešťanský	35 (9,9,9,8)	Paso doble	"Unstoppable" — E.S. Posthumus	Safe

Judges' votes to save

- Horáček: Silvia & David
- Drexler: Silvia & David
- Fialová: Emma & Filip
- Ďurovčík: Silvia & David

=== Week 9 ===
Couples performed two routines, and are listed in the order they performed.

Couple	Scores	Dance	Music	Result
Vladimír & Dominika C.	34 (9,8,9,8)	Slowfox	"The Addams Family theme" — The Addams Family	Safe
Vladimír & Dominika C.	38 (9,10,10,9)	Viennese waltz	"A Thousand Years" — Christina Perri	Safe
Evelyn & Lukáš	29 (7,7,8,7)	Tango	"Highway to Hell" — AC/DC	Eliminated
Evelyn & Lukáš	35 (8,9,10,8)	Cha-cha-cha	"Think" — Aretha Franklin	Eliminated
Branislav & Dominika R.	36 (9,9,10,8)	Salsa	"Thriller" — Michael Jackson	Safe
Branislav & Dominika R.	40 (10,10,10,10)	Argentine tango	"Montserrat" — Orquesta Del Plata	Safe
Silvia & David	27 (7,6,7,7)	Rumba	"Bring Me to Life" — Evanescence	Bottom two
Silvia & David	40 (10,10,10,10)	Quickstep	"Show Me How You Burlesque" — Christina Aguilera	Bottom two

Judges' votes to save

- Horáček: Silvia & David
- Drexler: Silvia & David
- Fialová: Evelyn & Lukáš
- Ďurovčík: Silvia & David

=== Week 10: Finale ===
Each couple performed two routines: unlearned dance and their showdance routine. Couples are listed in the order they performed.

Couple	Scores	Dance	Music	Result
Vladimír & Dominika C.	40 (10,10,10,10)	Tango	"There's Nothing Holdin' Me Back" — Shawn Mendes	Winners
Vladimír & Dominika C.	38 (10,9,10,9)	Showdance	"Singin' in the Rain" — Gene Kelly	Winners
Branislav & Dominika R.	40 (10,10,10,10)	Quickstep	"Dr. Bones" — Cherry Poppin' Daddies	Runners-up
Branislav & Dominika R.	38 (9,10,10,9)	Showdance	"Fix You" — Coldplay	Runners-up
Silvia & David	38 (10,9,10,9)	Argentine tango	"Asi Se Baila El Tango" — Veronica Verdier	Third place
Silvia & David	40 (10,10,10,10)	Showdance	Slovak folk music	Third place

== Dance chart ==
The couples performed the following each week: The couples performed the following each week:

- Weeks 1–6: One unlearned dance
- Week 7: One unlearned dance and group Tango or Jive
- Week 8: Two unlearned dances
- Week 9: One unlearned dance and one repeat dance
- Week 10: One unlearned dance and showdance routine

Let's Dance (season 6) - Dance chart
Couple	Week													
Couple	1	2	3	4	5	6	7		8		9		10	
Vladimír & Dominika C.	Cha-cha-cha	Charleston	Waltz	Salsa	Viennese waltz	Jive	Argentine tango	Tango	Quickstep	Paso doble	Slowfox	Viennese waltz	Tango	Showdance
Branislav & Dominika R.	Tango	Cha-cha-cha	Paso doble	Charleston	Rumba	Samba	Slowfox	Jive	Viennese waltz	Jive	Salsa	Argentine tango	Quickstep	Showdance
Silvia & David	Cha-cha-cha	Tango	Viennese waltz	Jive	Slowfox	Quickstep	Paso doble	Tango	Waltz	Salsa	Rumba	Quickstep	Argentine tango	Showdance
Evelyn & Lukáš	Cha-cha-cha	Viennese waltz	Jive	Slowfox	Rumba	Argentine tango	Salsa	Jive	Quickstep	Paso doble	Tango	Cha-cha-cha		
Emma & Filip	Waltz	Cha-cha-cha	Quickstep	Rumba	Viennese waltz	Salsa	Slowfox	Tango	Tango	Samba				
Lenka & Adam	Jive	Viennese waltz	Charleston	Paso doble	Rumba	Viennese waltz	Samba	Jive						
Michal & Patrícia	Waltz	Jive	Viennese waltz	Rumba	Charleston	Cha-cha-cha								
Petra & Fabio	Tango	Charleston	Rumba	Quickstep	Salsa									
Daniela & Erik	Cha-cha-cha	Tango	Jive	Waltz										
Yxo & Katarína	Tango	Jive	Quickstep											
Peter & Paulína	Jive	Tango												
