= Austin Powers in Goldmember (soundtrack) =

Austin Powers in Goldmember (Music from the Motion Picture)

Soundtrack album by various artists
- Released: July 16, 2002
- Genres: Disco; funk; pop; rock
- Length: 62:30
- Label: Maverick
- Producers: Danny Bramson; John Houlihan

Austin Powers series chronology
Austin Powers: The Spy Who Shagged Me (1999)	Austin Powers in Goldmember (2002)

Singles from Austin Powers in Goldmember
- 1. "Work It Out" Released: June 11, 2002; 2. "Boys" Released: June 24, 2002

Austin Powers in Goldmember (Music from the Motion Picture) is the soundtrack album to the 2002 film Austin Powers in Goldmember released through Maverick Records on July 16, 2002. The album is produced by Danny Bramson and John Houlihan, and featured vintage disco, funk, pop, rock and medley songs.

== Singles ==
Two singles preceded the album prior to its release. Beyoncé released her debut solo single "Work It Out" for the film. The song was premiered via AOL on May 23, 2002, and commercially released on June 11, 2002. The song marked her transition as a solo artist in the music scene, after fulfilling a career as the lead female vocalist of Destiny's Child. The second lead single "Boys" performed by Britney Spears featuring Pharrell Williams who co-produced the song with Chad Hugo under the Neptunes. It was premiered at AOL on June 13, and set a record of 1.35 million streams on the website, before its commercial release on June 24.

== Track listing ==
No.	Title	Artist(s)	Length
1.	"Work It Out" (Radio Edit)	Beyoncé	3:22
2.	"Miss You" (Dr. Dre Remix 2002)	The Rolling Stones	3:39
3.	"Boys" (Co-Ed Remix)	Britney Spears featuring Pharrell Williams	3:45
4.	"Groove Me"	Angie Stone	4:15
5.	"Shining Star"	Earth, Wind & Fire	2:53
6.	"Hey Goldmember (Note: samples (Shake, Shake, Shake) Shake Your Booty by KC and the Sunshine Band)"	Foxxy Cleopatra featuring Devin Vasquez and Solange	2:44
7.	"Ain't No Mystery"	Smash Mouth	3:56
8.	"Evil Woman"	Soul Hooligan featuring Diana King	3:45
9.	"1975 (Note: samples A Fifth of Beethoven by Walter Murphy)"	Paul Oakenfold	4:20
10.	"Hard Knock Life (Ghetto Anthem)" (Dr. Evil Remix)	Dr. Evil	1:44
11.	"Daddy Wasn't There"	Ming Tea featuring Austin Powers	2:45
12.	"Alfie (What's It All About, Austin?)"	Susanna Hoffs	2:45
Total length:			39:53

== Reception ==
Stephen Thomas Erlewine of AllMusic wrote "[the tunes] holds together pretty well, even through the rough spots, and can even dispel the suspicion that, with all the remixes and emphasis on modern soul, this soundtrack is the most calculated Austin Powers record yet." Josh Tyrangiel of Entertainment Weekly gave a B− rating to the album, where "nothing here is too inspired".

== Chart performance ==
=== Weekly charts ===
Weekly chart performance of Austin Powers in Goldmember: Music from the Motion Picture
Chart (2002)	Peak position
Australian Albums (ARIA)	34
Canadian Albums (Billboard)	28
Irish Compilation Albums (IRMA)	6
New Zealand Albums (RMNZ)	25
UK Soundtrack Albums (Official Charts)	1
US Billboard 200	27
US Top R&B/Hip-Hop Albums (Billboard)	46
US Soundtrack Albums (Billboard)	1

=== Year-end charts ===
Year-end chart performance of Austin Powers in Goldmember: Music from the Motion Picture
Chart (2002)	Peak position
Canadian R&B Albums (Nielsen SoundScan)	57

== Accolades ==
Award	Category	Recipients	Result
BMI Film & Television Awards	BMI Film Music Award	George S. Clinton	Won
Satellite Awards	Best Original Song	"Work It Out"	Nominated
