= Austin Powers: The Spy Who Shagged Me (soundtrack) =

1999 movie soundtrack album

Austin Powers: The Spy Who Shagged Me (Music from the Motion Picture)

Soundtrack album by various artists
- Released: June 1, 1999
- Genres: Rock; pop
- Length: 42:25
- Label: Maverick
- Producers: Danny Bramson; Guy Oseary

Austin Powers series chronology
Austin Powers: International Man of Mystery (1997)	Austin Powers: The Spy Who Shagged Me (1999)	Austin Powers in Goldmember (2002)

Singles from Austin Powers: The Spy Who Shagged Me (Music from the Motion Picture)
- 1. "Beautiful Stranger" Released: May 19, 1999; 2. "American Woman" Released: May 25, 1999; 3. "Word Up!" Released: June 28, 1999

Austin Powers: The Spy Who Shagged Me (More Music from the Motion Picture)

Soundtrack album by Various artists
- Released: October 26, 1999
- Genres: Rock; pop
- Length: 60:00
- Label: Maverick
- Producers: Danny Bramson; Guy Oseary

Austin Powers: The Spy Who Shagged Me (Music from the Motion Picture) is the soundtrack album to the 1999 film Austin Powers: The Spy Who Shagged Me released on June 1, 1999, through Maverick Records. The album was produced by Danny Bramson and Guy Oseary and featured a compilation of rock and pop songs, performed by high-profile artists such as Madonna, Lenny Kravitz, Mel B and R.E.M. It featured the Grammy Award-winning single "Beautiful Stranger" performed by Madonna, which was a chartbuster upon its release. The album was certified Platinum by the Recording Industry Association of America for selling around 1.5 million units in the U.S.

== Release ==
Austin Powers: The Spy Who Shagged Me (Music from the Motion Picture) released on June 1, 1999, eleven days prior to the film's release, through Maverick Records. Another album titled Austin Powers: The Spy Who Shagged Me (More Music from the Motion Picture) was released on October 26, 1999.

=== Singles ===
The song "Beautiful Stranger" was performed by Madonna and released as the lead single on May 19, 1999. A music video accompanied the release, which was directed by Brett Ratner and featured Myers as Austin Powers alongside Madonna. The song was a critical and commercial success, topping numerous charts and received multiple accolades. An extended play, including the previously released remixes of the song was released to all streaming outlets in May 2021.

The second song from the album to be released was Lenny Kravitz's cover version of "American Woman", originally performed by the Canadian rock band the Guess Who. It was first issued on May 25, 1999, and then released as a part of the 1999 reissue of Kravitz's album 5. The cover reached the top 20 in Australia, Finland, Italy, New Zealand, and Spain, as well as number 26 in Canada and number 49 on the US Billboard Hot 100. Kravitz's version is slower and softer than the original, without the signature guitar solo; he later said to Randy Bachman that the reason why he skipped the lead guitar part was "I couldn't get the sound. I couldn't get the tone." The music video (directed by Paul Hunter) featured actress Heather Graham (who starred in The Spy Who Shagged Me); the original political themes of the song were largely replaced by sex appeal. In 1999, Kravitz and his band were joined by The Guess Who for a live performance of "American Woman" at the MuchMusic Video Awards. It was also used as the theme song of the Madusa monster truck in monster jam events.

"Word Up!" was released as a single on June 28, 1999, after the album's release. It was performed by Mel B and produced by Timbaland.

== Reception ==
Rating three stars out of five, Gina Boldman of AllMusic called it "a worthy purchase for fans of the Powers films and the '60s sound celebrated in them." For the second album, Stephen Thomas Erlewine called it "the record is actually more consistent than its predecessor, and just as entertaining—even if it isn't exactly necessary and sort of feels like an afterthought." Orlando Weekly based critic wrote "packed with clever versions of classics, groovy new music and lots of fun, this is sure to be the soundtrack of the summer."

== Track listing ==
Austin Powers: The Spy Who Shagged Me (Music from the Motion Picture) track listing
No.	Title	Artist(s)	Length
1.	"Beautiful Stranger"	Madonna	04:23
2.	"My Generation"	The Who (live at BBC)	03:24
3.	"Draggin' the Line"	R.E.M.	04:27
4.	"American Woman"	Lenny Kravitz	04:19
5.	"Word Up!"	Melanie B (credited as Melanie G)	03:39
6.	"Just the Two of Us (Dr. Evil Mix)"	Dr. Evil (Mike Myers)	01:44
7.	"Espionage"	Green Day	03;23
8.	"Time of the Season"	Big Blue Missile and Scott Weiland	03:24
9.	"Buggin'"	The Flaming Lips	03:17
10.	"Alright"	The Lucy Nation	03:58
11.	"I'll Never Fall in Love Again"	Burt Bacharach and Elvis Costello	03:20
12.	"Soul Bossa Nova (Dim's Space-A-Nova)"	Quincy Jones and his Orchestra	03:07
Total length:			42:25

Austin Powers: The Spy Who Shagged Me (More Music from the Motion Picture) track listing
No.	Title	Artist(s)	Length
1.	"Austin Meets Felicity (Film Dialogue)"		00:10
2.	"Am I Sexy?"	Lords of Acid	03:34
3.	"I'm a Believer"	The Monkees	02:46
4.	"Magic Carpet Ride"	Steppenwolf	04:20
5.	"American Woman"	The Guess Who	03:51
6.	"Get the Girl"	The Bangles	03:10
7.	"Bachelor Pad (FPM Edit)"	Fantastic Plastic Machine	04:49
8.	"Let's Get It On"	Marvin Gaye	04:00
9.	"Crash!"	Propellerheads	03:44
10.	"Time of the Season"	The Zombies	04:15
11.	"Dr. Evil"	They Might Be Giants	01:48
12.	"The Austin Powers Shagaphonic Medley"	George S. Clinton	04:53
13.	"Beautiful Stranger (Calderone Radio Mix)"	Madonna	04:03
Total length:			45:23

== Score album ==
The original score to the film composed by George S. Clinton was released on November 7, 2000, through RCA Victor records label. It was combined with the score for the predecessor, Austin Powers: International Man of Mystery, with tracks 9–16 (2–10 in this list), represent the score composed for The Spy Who Shagged Me.

No.	Title	Length
1.	"Soul Bossa Nova"	02:38
2.	"I'm Back / Mini-Me / Time Portal"	02:27
3.	"Monkey Man"	01:21
4.	"The Shagga-nova"	03:00
5.	"Evil Island / Inside Out"	02:43
6.	"Felicity's Theme"	02:17
7.	"Laser Model"	01:31
8.	"Chess"	01:33
9.	"Blast Off / Fat Bastard / Prisoners"	02:36
10.	"Swinger Landing / 10 Minutes Ago / Gonna Blow / Time Portal Reprise"	03:46
Total length:		23:52

== Chart positions ==
=== Weekly charts ===
Chart (1999)	Peak position
Australian Albums (ARIA)	5
Austrian Albums (Ö3 Austria)	40
Canadian Albums (Billboard)	5
Dutch Albums (Album Top 100)	87
German Albums (Offizielle Top 100)	88
New Zealand Albums (RMNZ)	6
Norwegian Albums (VG-lista)	30
Scottish Albums (Official Charts)	14
US Billboard 200	5

=== Year-end charts ===
Chart (1999)	Position
Australian Albums (ARIA)	52
US Billboard 200	70

== Certifications ==
Region	Certification	Certified units/sales
Australia (ARIA)	Platinum	70,000^{^}
Canada (Music Canada)	Platinum	100,000^{^}
New Zealand (RMNZ)	Platinum	15,000^{^}
United Kingdom (BPI)	Gold	100,000^{^}
United States (RIAA)	Platinum	1,500,000
^{^} Shipments figures based on certification alone.

== Accolades ==
Award	Category	Recipients	Result
ASCAP Pop Awards	Most Performed Song (for "Beautiful Stranger")	Madonna, William Orbit	Won
Blockbuster Entertainment Awards	Favorite Soundtrack	—	Won
BMI Awards	BMI Film Music Award	George S. Clinton	Won
Brit Awards	Best Soundtrack	—	Won
Golden Globe Awards	Best Original Song (for "Beautiful Stranger")	Madonna, William Orbit	Nominated
Grammy Awards	Best Song Written for a Motion Picture, Television, or Other Visual Media (for "Beautiful Stranger")	Madonna, William Orbit	Won
Grammy Awards	Best Male Rock Vocal Performance (for "American Woman")	Lenny Kravitz	Won
Grammy Awards	Best Female Pop Vocal Performance (for "Beautiful Stranger")	Madonna	Nominated
Grammy Awards	Best Soundtrack Album	—	Nominated
Ivor Novello Award	Most Performed Work (for "Beautiful Stranger")	Madonna, William Orbit	Won
Ivor Novello Award	Best Contemporary Song (for "Beautiful Stranger")	Madonna, William Orbit	Nominated
Kids' Choice Awards	Favorite Song from a Movie	Madonna	Nominated
Las Vegas Film Critics Society	Best Song (for "Beautiful Stranger")	Madonna	Won
MTV Europe Music Awards	Best Song (for "Beautiful Stranger")	Madonna, William Orbit	Nominated
MTV Movie Awards	Best Musical Performance	Mike Myers, Verne Troyer	Nominated
