= Let's Dance (Slovak TV series) season 5 =

Series of Dancing Competition on television

Let's Dance
- Season 5
- Presented by: Libor Bouček; Adela Banášová
- Judges: Jozef Bednárik; Zdeněk Chlopčík; Dara Rolins; Ján Ďurovčík
- Celebrity winner: Jana Hospodárová
- Professional winner: Matej Chren
- No. of episodes: 11

Release
- Original network: Markíza
- Original release: 9 September – 18 November 2011

Series chronology
- ← Previous; Season 4 Next → Season 6

Let's Dance aired its fifth series on Markíza from 9 September 2011 to 18 November 2011. The series was presented by Libor Bouček and Adela Banášová. The judging panel consisted of Jozef Bednárik, Zdeněk Chlopčík, Dara Rolins and Ján Ďurovčík.

On 18 November 2011, TV host Jana Hospodárová and Matej Chren were announced as the winners, while actor Martin Mňahončák and Natália Glosíková finished as the runners-up.

This season was criticized for the judges’ overly harsh assessments and low scores in the final rounds. The production team prepared various tasks for the couples, which they had to incorporate into their dances. This was also poorly received by the audience.

== Format ==
The couples dance each week in a live show. The judges score each performance out of ten. After all the couples have danced they are then ranked according to the judges' scores and given points according to their rank, with the highest ranked couple receiving a number of points equal to the number of couples dancing that week e.g. 7 points where there are seven couples dancing. When there are no tied scores the lowest scored couple will receive one point. However, in the event of a tie where two or more couples obtain the same judges score, the couple below those in the tie will be awarded one point below the points awarded to each of the tied couples. So, for example, if two couples obtain the same rank and obtain 7 points each, the couple immediately below them will be awarded 6 points. When couples are ranked equally by the judges the scoring of all other couples underneath will follow in the same descending order. Should there be any tied scores the lowest scored couple will therefore receive more than one point from the judges scores. The public are also invited to vote for their favourite couples, and the couples are ranked again according to the number of votes they receive, again receiving points; The couple with the most votes receiving the most points. Again in the unlikely event of a tie in the public vote the points are awarded in the same way as the points from the judges score.

== Couples ==
The twelve couples featuring selected celebrities and their dancing partners:

Celebrity	Occupation / Known for	Dance partner	Status
Karin Haydu	Actress	Tomáš Antálek	Eliminated 1st on September 9, 2011
Sisa Sklovská	Singer	Omar Topić	Eliminated 2nd on September 16, 2011
Katarína Knechtová	Singer	Tomáš Uváček	Eliminated 3rd on September 23, 2011
Tomi "Kid" Kovács	Boxer	Michaela Marková	Eliminated 4th on September 30, 2011
Alena Heribanová	TV host	Tomáš Surovec	Eliminated 5th on October 7, 2011
Gabriela Gunčíková	Czech singer	Peter Modrovský	Eliminated 6th on October 14, 2011
Patrik Švajda	Newsreader	Martina Reiterová	Eliminated 7th on October 21, 2011
Viktor Horján	Actor	Marek Vrána	Eliminated 8th on October 28, 2011
Petra Marko	Businesswoman	Dodo Herák	Eliminated 9th on November 4, 2011
Peter Marcin	Actor, comedian	Ivana Surovcová	Withdrew on November 11, 2011
Martin Mňahončák	Actor	Natália Glosíková	Runner-up on November 18, 2011
Jana Hospodárová	TV host	Matej Chren	Winner on November 18, 2011

Color key:

Winners
Runners-up
Bottom two
Eliminated
Withdrew from competition

Let's Dance (season 5) - Weekly scores
Couple	Pl.	Week											
Couple	Pl.	1	2	3	4	5	6	7	8	9	10	11	10+11
Jana & Matej	1st	22†	23	23	18	23	30	22+29=51	24+34=58†	28+29+6=63	30+28+38=96‡	32+38+40=110‡	206‡
Martin & Natália	2nd	14	16	19	20	17	24	30+19=49	22+29=51	24+32+4=60	27+32+38=97†	35+40+39=114†	211†
Peter & Ivana	3rd	15	26†	24	20	33†	28	37+33=70†	28+23=51	28+36+10=74†			
Petra & Dodo	4th	21	22	19	27	17	31†	25+24=49	31+24=55	24+23+8=55‡			
Viktor & Marek	5th	20	26†	21	28	27	23‡	21+22=43	23+27=50‡				
Patrik & Martina	6th	18	19	17	29†	24	24	16+16=32‡					
Gabriela & Peter	7th	14	13‡	33†	23	26	24						
Alena & Tomáš S.	8th	14	18	22	17‡	15‡							
Tomi & Michaela	9th	8‡	17	18	19								
Katarína & Tomáš U.	10th	13	19	15‡									
Sisa & Omar	11th	13	13‡										
Karin & Tomáš A.	12th	12											

== Weekly scores ==
Unless indicated otherwise, individual judges scores in the charts below are given (in parentheses) in this order from left to right: Jozef Bednárik, Zdeněk Chlopčík, Dara Rolins, Ján Ďurovčík.

=== Week 1 ===
Couples performed either the quickstep or the rumba, and are listed in the order they performed.

Couple	Scores	Dance	Music	Result
Karin & Tomáš A.	12 (3,3,3,3)	Quickstep	"Diamonds Are a Girl's Best Friend" — Marilyn Monroe	Eliminated
Sisa & Omar	13 (3,5,2,3)	Rumba	"Tell Him" — Barbra Streisand & Celine Dion	Safe
Peter & Ivana	15 (4,4,4,3)	Quickstep	"Hey Pachuco" — Royal Crown Revue	Safe
Tomi & Michaela	8 (2,2,2,2)	Rumba	"Empire State of Mind" — Alicia Keys	Safe
Gabriela & Peter	14 (3,3,4,4)	Quickstep	"99 Luftballons" — Nena	Safe
Katarína & Tomáš U.	13 (5,2,4,2)	Rumba	"Slnečná balada" — Peha	Safe
Alena & Tomáš S.	14 (4,3,4,3)	Quickstep	"We No Speak Americano" — Yolanda Be Cool	Safe
Patrik & Martina	18 (5,5,4,4)	Rumba	"Shape of My Heart" — Sting	Safe
Martin & Natália	14 (3,3,5,3)	Quickstep	"Walking on Sunshine" — Katrina and the Waves	Safe
Petra & Dodo	21 (5,7,3,6)	Rumba	"Wicked Game" — Chris Isaak	Safe
Jana & Matej	22 (6,5,6,5)	Quickstep	"Valerie" — Amy Winehouse	Safe
Viktor & Marek	20 (5,5,7,3)	Rumba	"If I Were a Boy" — Beyoncé	Safe

=== Week 2 ===
Couples performed either the cha-cha-cha or the waltz, and are listed in the order they performed.

Couple	Scores	Dance	Music	Result
Sisa & Omar	13 (4,2,4,3)	Waltz	"When I Need You" — Leo Sayer	Eliminated
Gabriela & Peter	13 (3,3,3,4)	Cha-cha-cha	"Forget You" — CeeLo Green	Safe
Katarína & Tomáš U.	19 (5,5,5,4)	Waltz	"If I Ain't Got You" — Alicia Keys	Safe
Martin & Natália	16 (3,4,4,5)	Cha-cha-cha	"Should I Stay or Should I Go" — The Clash	Safe
Patrik & Martina	19 (5,5,4,5)	Waltz	"What the World Needs Now Is Love" — Jackie DeShannon	Safe
Jana & Matej	23 (6,5,7,5)	Cha-cha-cha	"Brimful of Asha" — Cornershop	Safe
Tomi & Michaela	17 (6,3,5,3)	Waltz	"Love Theme from The Godfather" — The Godfather	Safe
Peter & Ivana	26 (6,6,9,5)	Cha-cha-cha	"Groove Is in the Heart" — Deee-Lite	Safe
Petra & Dodo	22 (6,6,4,6)	Waltz	"Unchained Melody" — Todd Duncan	Safe
Alena & Tomáš S.	18 (5,3,6,4)	Cha-cha-cha	"Mercy" — Duffy	Safe
Viktor & Marek	26 (7,6,8,5)	Waltz	"Brokeback Mountain" — Brokeback Mountain	Safe

=== Week 3 ===
Couples performed either the jive or the tango, and are listed in the order they performed.

Couple	Scores	Dance	Music	Result
Petra & Dodo	19 (5,6,3,5)	Jive	"Candyman" — Christina Aguilera	Safe
Jana & Matej	23 (7,6,5,5)	Tango	"Milonga de Amor" — Gotan Project	Safe
Patrik & Martina	17 (5,4,4,4)	Jive	"Jailhouse Rock" — Elvis Presley	Safe
Alena & Tomáš S.	22 (7,5,5,5)	Tango	"Cirque du Soleil" — Cirque du Soleil	Safe
Tomi & Michaela	18 (5,3,7,3)	Jive	"SOS" — Rihanna	Safe
Peter & Ivana	24 (7,6,7,4)	Tango	"Paris un tango" — Mireille Mathieu	Safe
Katarína & Peter U.	15 (4,3,5,3)	Jive	"Greased Lightnin'" — John Travolta	Eliminated
Martin & Natália	19 (6,4,4,5)	Tango	"Reflejo de Luna" — Paco de Lucía	Safe
Viktor & Marek	21 (6,5,6,4)	Jive	"Hey Ya!" — Outkast	Safe
Gabriela & Peter	33 (8,9,10,6)	Tango	"Bust Your Windows" — Jazmine Sullivan	Safe

=== Week 4 ===
Couples performed either the salsa or the Viennese waltz, and are listed in the order they performed.

Couple	Scores	Dance	Music	Result
Jana & Matej	18 (5,5,4,4)	Salsa	"Hips Don't Lie" — Shakira	Safe
Tomi & Michaela	19 (6,4,6,3)	Viennese waltz	"Nothing Else Matters" — Metallica	Eliminated
Gabriela & Peter	23 (6,6,7,4)	Salsa	"Acuyuye" — Johnny Pacheco	Safe
Patrik & Martina	29 (8,8,8,5)	Viennese waltz	"Morgenblätter" — Johann Strauss II	Safe
Martin & Natália	20 (6,4,6,4)	Salsa	"Conga" — Miami Sound Machine	Safe
Petra & Dodo	27 (4,8,9,6)	Viennese waltz	"Stop!" — Sam Brown	Safe
Alena & Tomáš	17 (5,5,4,3)	Salsa	"La Isla Bonita" — Madonna	Safe
Viktor & Marek	28 (9,4,10,5)	Viennese waltz	"Cigaretka na dva ťahy" — Richard Müller	Safe
Peter & Ivana	20 (6,3,8,3)	Salsa	"Get Busy" — Sean Paul	Safe

=== Week 5 ===
Couples performed either the slowfox or the paso doble, and are listed in the order they performed.

Couple	Scores	Dance	Music	Result
Gabriela & Peter	26 (8,6,7,5)	Slowfox	"Always Look on the Bright Side of Life" — Monty Python	Safe
Petra & Dodo	17 (6,5,2,4)	Paso doble	"Don't Let Me Be Misunderstood" — The Animals	Safe
Jana & Matej	23 (7,6,6,4)	Slowfox	"I Wanna Be Loved by You" — Marilyn Monroe	Safe
Martin & Natália	17 (6,5,3,3)	Slowfox	"Raindrops Keep Fallin' on My Head" — B. J. Thomas	Safe
Patrik & Martina	24 (8,5,7,4)	Paso doble	"España cañí" — Pascual Marquina	Safe
Alena & Tomáš	15 (6,3,3,3)	Slowfox	"Sex and the City theme" — Sex and the City	Eliminated
Viktor & Marek	27 (8,7,8,4)	Paso doble	"The Phantom of the Opera" — Sarah Brightman & Steve Harley	Safe
Peter & Ivana	33 (9,8,10,6)	Slowfox	"The Pink Panther Theme" — Henry Mancini	Safe

=== Week 6 ===
Couples performed the samba, and are listed in the order they performed.

Dara Rolins was unable to take part in this round due to work commitments. Juraj Mokrý, the winner of the third series, took her place on the judging panel in this round.

Couple	Scores	Dance	Music	Result
Martin & Natália	24 (6,5,8,5)	Samba	"Magalenha" — Carlinhos Brown	Safe
Viktor & Marek	23 (7,4,8,4)	Samba	"Lady Carneval" — Karel Gott	Safe
Petra & Dodo	31 (6,10,9,6)	Samba	"Single Ladies (Put a Ring on It)" — Beyoncé	Safe
Gabriela & Peter	24 (7,4,9,4)	Samba	"Dr. Beat" — Miami Sound Machine	Eliminated
Jana & Matej	30 (7,8,10,5)	Samba	"Waka Waka (This Time for Africa)" — Shakira	Safe
Peter & Ivana	28 (8,7,9,4)	Samba	"Macarena" — Los del Río	Safe
Patrik & Martina	24 (6,5,9,4)	Samba	"Mas que nada" — Jorge Ben	Safe

=== Week 7 ===
Each couple performed two unlearned dances, and are listed in the order they performed.

Couple	Scores	Dance	Music	Result
Patrik & Martina	16 (5,3,5,3)	Quickstep	"Fairytale" — Alexander Rybak	Eliminated
Patrik & Martina	16 (5,4,3,4)	Cha-cha-cha	"Sex Bomb" — Tom Jones	Eliminated
Jana & Matej	22 (7,4,6,5)	Jive	"Tutti Frutti" — Little Richard	Safe
Jana & Matej	29 (8,6,10,5)	Waltz	"Come Away with Me" — Norah Jones	Safe
Petra & Dodo	25 (7,7,5,6)	Slowfox	"Fly Me to the Moon" — Kaye Ballard	Safe
Petra & Dodo	24 (7,5,7,5)	Salsa	"I Still Haven't Found What I'm Looking For" — U2	Safe
Viktor & Marek	21 (7,4,7,3)	Cha-cha-cha	"Rumour Has It" — Adele	Safe
Viktor & Marek	22 (8,3,8,3)	Slowfox	"Haven't Met You Yet" — Michael Bublé	Safe
Martin & Natália	30 (10,6,9,5)	Waltz	"Je suis malade" — Lara Fabian	Safe
Martin & Natália	19 (6,5,5,3)	Paso doble	"He's a Pirate" — Klaus Badelt	Safe
Peter & Ivana	37 (10,10,10,7)	Viennese waltz	"Little Susie" — Michael Jackson	Safe
Peter & Ivana	33 (9,8,10,6)	Jive	"I'm So Excited" — The Pointer Sisters	Safe

=== Week 8 ===
Each couple performed Argentine tango and one unlearned dance, and are listed in the order they performed.

Couple	Scores	Dance	Music	Result
Martin & Natália	22 (6,4,8,4)	Argentine tango	"Una música brutal" — Gotan Project	Safe
Martin & Natália	29 (8,6,10,5)	Rumba	"Always on My Mind" — Elvis Presley	Safe
Viktor & Marek	23 (7,5,8,3)	Salsa	"La Camisa Negra" — Juanes	Eliminated
Viktor & Marek	27 (9,5,9,4)	Argentine tango	"Sweet Dreams (Are Made of This)" — Eurythmics	Eliminated
Peter & Ivana	28 (8,6,9,5)	Argentine tango	"Libertango" — Astor Piazzolla	Safe
Peter & Ivana	23 (7,3,9,4)	Rumba	"GoldenEye" — Tina Turner	Safe
Jana & Matej	24 (7,6,6,5)	Rumba	"The Look of Love" — Dusty Springfield	Safe
Jana & Matej	34 (9,8,10,7)	Argentine tango	"La cumparsita" — Gerardo Matos Rodríguez	Safe
Petra & Dodo	31 (8,10,6,7)	Argentine tango	"Tango to Evora" — Loreena McKennitt	Safe
Petra & Dodo	24 (3,7,7,7)	Cha-cha-cha	"Buttons" — The Pussycat Dolls	Safe

=== Week 9 ===
Each couple performed Lindy Hop, one unlearned dance and Cha-cha-cha Marathon, and are listed in the order they performed.

Couple	Scores	Dance	Music	Result
Peter & Ivana	28 (8,5,10,5)	Lindy Hop	"Wake Me Up Before You Go-Go" — Wham!	Safe
Peter & Ivana	36 (8,10,10,8)	Waltz	"It Is You (I Have Loved)" — Dana Glover	Safe
Martin & Natália	24 (8,3,8,5)	Viennese waltz	"Where the Wild Roses Grow" — Nick Cave and the Bad Seeds & Kylie Minogue	Safe
Martin & Natália	32 (8,9,10,5)	Lindy Hop	"Jump Up" — Spirits of Rhythm	Safe
Jana & Matej	28 (9,6,7,6)	Lindy Hop	"The Dirty Boogie" — The Brian Setzer Orchestra	Safe
Jana & Matej	29 (8,6,10,5)	Viennese waltz	"Kiss from a Rose" — Seal	Safe
Petra & Dodo	24 (7,5,6,6)	Quickstep	"Pon de Replay" — Rihanna	Eliminated
Petra & Dodo	23 (7,5,5,6)	Lindy Hop	"Umbrella" — Rihanna	Eliminated
Martin & Natália	4	Cha-cha-cha Marathon	"Ain't No Other Man" — Christina Aguilera	
Jana & Matej	6	Cha-cha-cha Marathon	"Ain't No Other Man" — Christina Aguilera	
Petra & Dodo	8	Cha-cha-cha Marathon	"Ain't No Other Man" — Christina Aguilera	
Peter & Ivana	10	Cha-cha-cha Marathon	"Ain't No Other Man" — Christina Aguilera	

=== Week 10 ===
Each couple performed Twist, one redemption dance and Latin or Standard relay, and are listed in the order they performed.

At the beginning of the round, Peter Marcin came onto the dance floor wearing a splint. He announced that he was withdrawing from the competition due to a muscle injury in his leg. The points and the viewers’ votes from this round were added to the points in the final.

Couple	Scores	Dance	Music
Martin & Natália	27 (8,6,7,6)	Quickstep	"The Lady Is a Tramp" — Mitzi Green
Martin & Natália	32 (7,9,10,6)	Twist	"Misirlou" — Dick Dale
Martin & Natália	38 (10,10,10,8)	Latin relay	Medley of classic latin melodies
Jana & Matej	30 (8,6,9,7)	Salsa	"La Vida Es Un Carnaval" — Celia Cruz
Jana & Matej	28 (6,7,10,5)	Twist	"Misirlou" — Dick Dale
Jana & Matej	38 (10,10,9,9)	Standard relay	Medley of Hana Hegerová's songs

=== Week 11: Finale ===
Each couple performed three routines: unlearned dance, their favorite dance and their freestyle routine. Couples are listed in the order they performed.

Couple	Scores	Dance	Music	Result
Jana & Matej	32 (8,8,8,8)	Paso doble	"España cañí" — Pascual Marquina	Winners
Jana & Matej	38 (10,9,10,9)	Argentine tango	"La cumparsita" — Gerardo Matos Rodríguez	Winners
Jana & Matej	40 (10,10,10,10)	Freestyle	Slovak folk music	Winners
Martin & Natália	35 (9,9,9,8)	Jive	"Proud Mary" — Creedence Clearwater Revival	Runners-up
Martin & Natália	40 (10,10,10,10)	Waltz	"Je suis malade" — Lara Fabian	Runners-up
Martin & Natália	39 (10,10,10,9)	Freestyle	"Thriller" — Michael Jackson	Runners-up

== Dance chart ==
The couples performed the following each week:

- Week 1: One unlearned dance (quickstep or rumba)
- Week 2: One unlearned dance (cha-cha-cha or waltz)
- Week 3: One unlearned dance (jive or tango)
- Week 4: One unlearned dance (salsa or Viennese waltz)
- Week 5: One unlearned dance (slowfox or paso doble)
- Week 6: Samba
- Week 7: Two unlearned dances
- Week 8: One unlearned dance & Argentine tango
- Week 9: One unlearned dance, Lindy Hop & Cha-cha-cha Marathon
- Week 10: One redemption dance, Twist & Latin or Standard relay
- Week 11: One unlearned dance, favorite dance and freestyle routine

Let's Dance (season 5) - Dance chart
Couple	Week																		
Couple	1	2	3	4	5	6	7		8		9			10			11		
Jana & Matej	Quickstep	Cha-cha-cha	Tango	Salsa	Slowfox	Samba	Jive	Waltz	Rumba	Argentine tango	Lindy Hop	Viennese waltz	Cha-cha-cha Marathon	Salsa	Twist	Standard relay	Paso doble	Argentine tango	Freestyle
Martin & Natália	Quickstep	Cha-cha-cha	Tango	Salsa	Slowfox	Samba	Waltz	Paso doble	Argentine tango	Rumba	Viennese waltz	Lindy Hop	Cha-cha-cha Marathon	Quickstep	Twist	Latin relay	Jive	Waltz	Freestyle
Peter & Ivana	Quickstep	Cha-cha-cha	Tango	Salsa	Slowfox	Samba	Viennese waltz	Jive	Argentine tango	Rumba	Lindy Hop	Waltz	Cha-cha-cha Marathon						
Petra & Dodo	Rumba	Waltz	Jive	Viennese waltz	Paso doble	Samba	Slowfox	Salsa	Argentine tango	Cha-cha-cha	Quickstep	Lindy Hop	Cha-cha-cha Marathon						
Viktor & Marek	Rumba	Waltz	Jive	Viennese waltz	Paso doble	Samba	Cha-cha-cha	Slowfox	Salsa	Argentine tango									
Patrik & Martina	Rumba	Waltz	Jive	Viennese waltz	Paso doble	Samba	Quickstep	Cha-cha-cha											
Gabriela & Peter	Quickstep	Cha-cha-cha	Tango	Salsa	Slowfox	Samba													
Alena & Tomáš S.	Quickstep	Cha-cha-cha	Tango	Salsa	Slowfox														
Tomi & Michaela	Rumba	Waltz	Jive	Viennese waltz															
Katarína & Tomáš U.	Rumba	Waltz	Jive																
Sisa & Omar	Rumba	Waltz																	
Karin & Tomáš A.	Quickstep																		
