= Boys (Britney Spears song) =

2002 single by Britney Spears

Single by Britney Spears featuring Pharrell Williams

from the album Britney and Austin Powers in Goldmember: Music from the Motion Picture
- B-side: "I'm a Slave 4 U"
- Released: June 24, 2002
- Recorded: 2001
- Studio: Master Sound (Virginia Beach); Right Track (New York)
- Genre: R&B; hip hop
- Length: 3:26 (album version); 3:45 (The Co-Ed Remix)
- Label: Jive; Maverick; Reprise
- Songwriters: Chad Hugo; Pharrell Williams
- Producer: The Neptunes

Britney Spears singles chronology
"I Love Rock 'n' Roll" (2002)	"Boys" (2002)	"Anticipating" (2002)

Pharrell Williams singles chronology
"Nothin'" (2002)	"Boys" (2002)	"When the Last Time" (2002)

Music video
- "Boys" on YouTube

"Boys" is a song by American singer Britney Spears from her third album Britney (2001). It was written and produced by Chad Hugo and Pharrell Williams (known collectively as the Neptunes). A version of the song titled "The Co-Ed Remix" and featuring guest vocals from Williams was released as the fifth single from Britney on June 24, 2002. The new version also served as the second single from the soundtrack of Austin Powers in Goldmember. "Boys" is a R&B and hip hop song, including funk influences. The remix carries a slower tempo than the album version, and both versions were noted by critics to be reminiscent of music by American artist Janet Jackson. Some critics praised Spears and Williams' chemistry, as well as the production on the track, while others did not think the song worked well.

While the song did not perform well on the Billboard charts in the United States, it reached the top ten on the Belgian charts and in Ireland and the United Kingdom, and charted in the top 20 in Australia, Germany, Austria, Switzerland, Sweden, Finland, and Denmark. The song would later be certified gold in Australia. The song's accompanying music video, directed by Dave Meyers, was nominated at the 2003 MTV Video Music Awards for Best Video from a Film. The clip features Spears and Williams at a party. Spears has performed "Boys" a number of times including at the 2002 NBA All-Star Game, on Saturday Night Live, and on several of her concert tours.

== Background and release ==
"Boys" was originally recorded by Janet Jackson who passed on it before it was given to Spears. The song was first included on Spears' third, self-titled studio album. It was written and produced by The Neptunes (Chad Hugo and Pharrell Williams) — members of American group N.E.R.D. For the song's single release, it was re-recorded as "The Co-Ed Remix", with a slightly different sound, and added featured vocals from Pharrell Williams. While the original version of the song was performed by Spears in a cameo appearance in the movie Austin Powers in Goldmember, "The Co-Ed Remix" was included on its soundtrack. It was released as the second single from the soundtrack, following "Work It Out", performed by one of the film's stars, Beyoncé. It was also the sixth single release to come from Britney. A press release for Maverick Records called the track a standout from the film's soundtrack, and said that Spears' cameo in the film "brings superstar status to the Fembot brigade." The release also stated that the song and video "stays true to the fractured funk [at] the heart of the film." AOL Music premiered the new track on June 13, 2002, and it was streamed more than 1.35 million times, setting a new record an AOL Music "First Listen."

== Composition ==
"Boys" (The Co-Ed Remix)
A sample of the Co-Ed remix of "Boys", with Spears trading lines with Pharrell Williams

"Boys" is a song that combines R&B with hip hop. According to the sheet music published at Music Notes by EMI Music Publishing, it is set in the time signature of common time and has a tempo of 108 beats per minute. While the original Britney version features Spears solely, "The Co-Ed Remix" which was released as a single, sees the singer and the song's co-producer, rapper Pharrell Williams trading lines. The remix version of the track contains a slower tempo then that of the original. According to the Milwaukee Journal Sentinel, Williams and Spears put on a "rap-lite teen-pop tease." The song also includes influences of funk music. During the time of the album's release, her official site stated that the song had aspects of 70's soul music and influences of Prince's music. According to Alex Needham of NME, the track takes influence from Janet Jackson. David Browne of Entertainment Weekly said the song was "cut-rate '80s Janet Jackson." Lyrical content sees Spears eying a guy with an intent to "get nasty."

== Critical reception ==
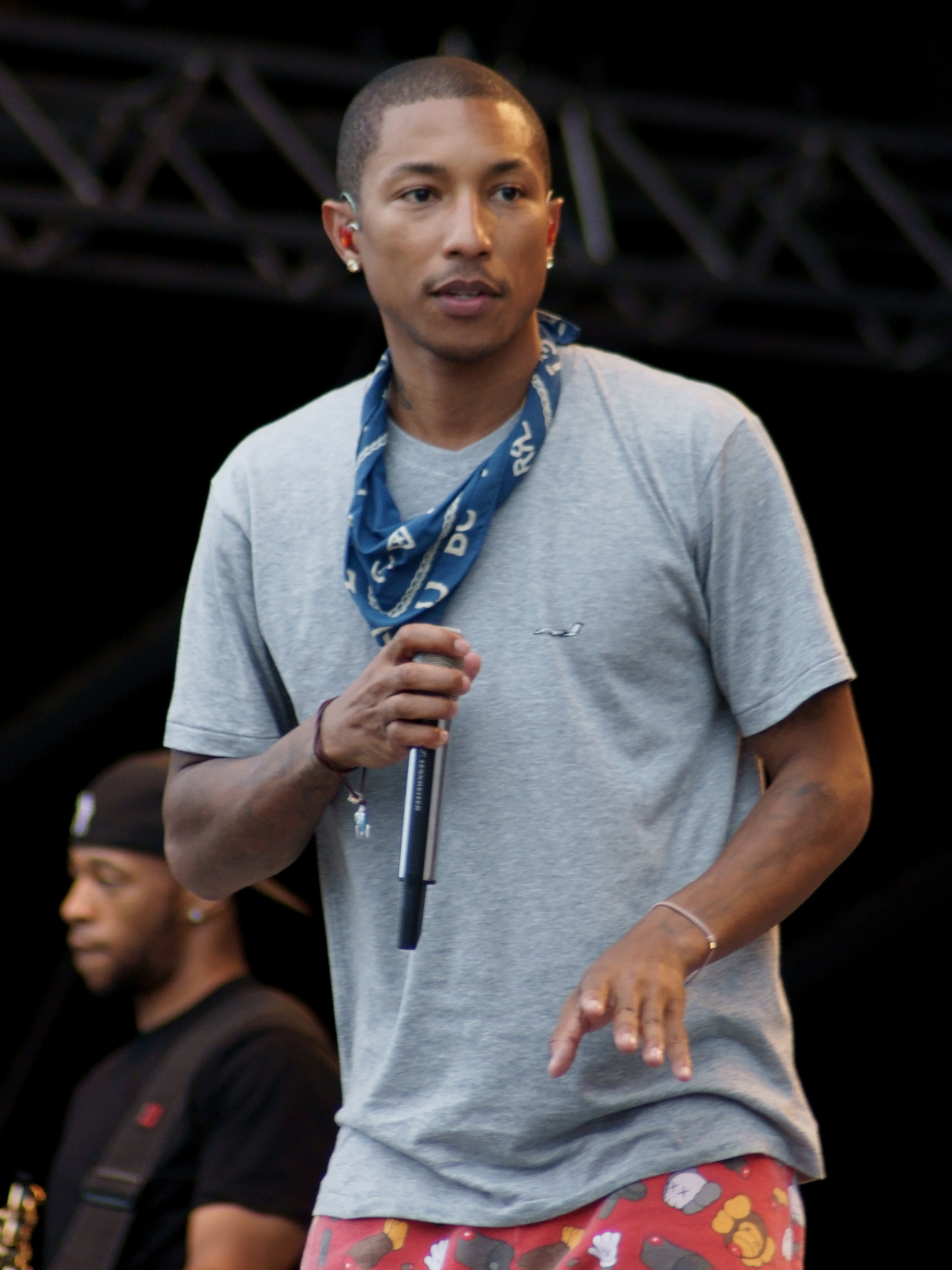
Critics were divided concerning the production of Pharrell Williams (pictured) and Chad Hugo on "Boys."

Calling the song "a decidedly lubricious duet", Alex Needham of New Musical Express said that "She sings about boys, he sings about girls. A simple concept, but an effective one, resulting in Britney's best single [in] ages." David Browne of Entertainment Weekly said that The Neptunes' productions on the album, "I'm a Slave 4 U" and "Boys" "swaddle her in writhing, kick-the-can beats, but never have a groove and a verse been so betrayed by a limp chorus." Nicki Tranter of PopMatters said that the remainder of the album was "tried and tested" dance-pop, noting "Boys" and "Cinderella" revisiting "old Britney territory exploring predictable issues including her love being irreplaceable, her use of the dance floor as an appropriate courting place, and her much-loved girl-ness." Leah Greenblatt from Entertainment Weekly called it a "popping, Janet-esque groove." Yale Daily News writer Catherine Halaby considered the song "an envelope-pushing (when you consider her claims of wholesomeness) smutfest."

The staff from Entertainment Weekly placed "Boys" at number 21 on their ranking of Spears' songs, writing that "anyone who ever fantasized about a mash-up of Britney and Janet Jackson got their wish with this track. [...] ['Boys'] sounds a lot like Miss Jackson's 1986 smash 'Nasty' [...] For Janet, the record would have been redundant. For Brit, it functions as an apt homage". This last part being a reference to Jackson recording the song first. Nicholas Hautman, from Us Weekly, criticized the remix for omitting the "euphoric bridge". Shannon Barbour from Cosmopolitan called it Spears' fourth greatest song. Nayer Nissim, from Pink News, deemed it "one of her most sleek and sharp pop hits. The single remix adds an effortlessly cool Pharrell rap that takes it to the next level". Spin's Caryn Ganz ranked it as the singer's 20th greatest song; "the Neptunes' magical collaborations with the Princess of Pop – a chic bass line, bare-bones beat, and three and a half minutes of Spears cooing about those nasty boys". Complex magazine listed "The Co-Ed Remix" as the 33rd best R&B song by a white artist from the 2000s decade, deeming it "another creative success for The Neptunes and Britney who gave each other more credibility in the hip-hop and pop worlds, respectively".

== Chart performance ==
The song failed to make much of an impact in the United States, only appearing on the Billboard Bubbling Under Hot 100 chart, where it appeared at number 22. It appeared on the Billboard Pop Songs chart at number 32. In Canada, on the Canadian Singles Chart, the song performed better, reaching number 21. "Boys" fared better internationally, appearing in the top 20 in several markets in which it charted. On the UK Singles Chart, the song peaked at number seven. It also peaked in the top ten of the Irish Singles Chart and both the Belgian Flanders and Wallonia Ultratop charts. On the ARIA Singles Chart in Australia, the song spent 12 weeks on the chart, peaking at number 14. "Boys" was certified gold in Australia by the Australian Recording Industry Association. Furthermore, it peaked in the top 20 of the charts in Germany, Austria, Switzerland, Sweden, Finland, and Denmark.

== Music video ==
The music video for "Boys" was directed by Dave Meyers, who also directed the music video for Spears' 2000 song "Lucky", and premiered on June 17, 2002. In the video, a man (DJ Qualls) tries to get into a castle which is hosting a party being attended by Spears. When the security guards refuse to grant him access because he is not on the guest list, he begins to scream for Spears (after shouting that he had Fruity Pebbles with P. Diddy). As the music starts, Spears, readying herself for the party in one of the castle's towers, is dancing with a group of women. The scene shifts to a castle courtyard, where Spears and a man are sit at opposite ends of a long table. Following this, Spears walks around a pool, in which she sees a man (Justin Bruening) swimming. As they begin to interact with each other, Pharrell is at the bar with a woman. Spears walks over to him and they begin to talk. Following this, Spears dances with a group of people, including Mike Myers as Austin Powers. Actors Jason Priestley, Justin Bruening and Taye Diggs also make cameo appearances in the video. The video was nominated at the 2003 MTV Video Music Awards for Best Video from a Film, but lost to Eminem's "Lose Yourself."

== Live performances and usage in media ==
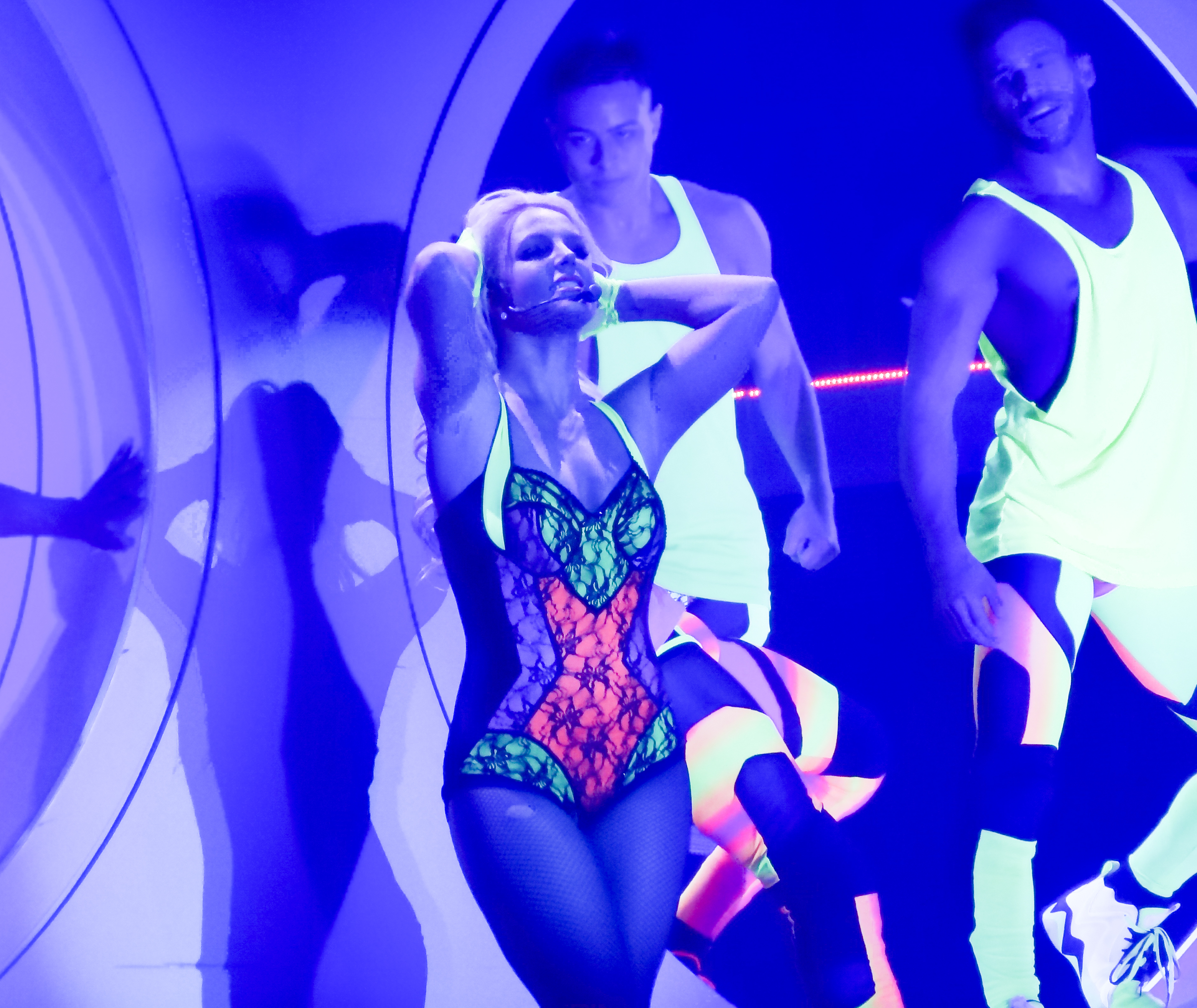
Spears performing "Boys" at Britney: Piece of Me in 2014

Spears performed "Boys" on multiple occasions. On the 2001 Dream Within a Dream Tour, Spears performed it wearing a tank-top and suspenders. In the tour's extension in 2002, she replaced the original version with the remix on the tour. She performed the song on the twenty-seventh season of Saturday Night Live on February 2, 2002. She also performed it on February 10, 2002, at the 2002 NBA All-Star Game. In the United Kingdom, Spears performed the song on CD:UK. She performed the song as a mashup with "I'm a Slave 4 U" on her 2003 ABC special, Britney Spears: In the Zone, to promote her fourth studio album In the Zone (2003).

On The Onyx Hotel Tour in 2004, it featured male dancers pushing her while she was standing in luggage carts. During her performance of the song on The Circus Starring Britney Spears, the singer performed wearing a military costume, while surrounded by her dancers, some of them riding bicycles. The rendition was described as a "Rhythm Nation-like military stomp." On 2011's Femme Fatale Tour, Spears wears a golden cape for a snake charming number of the song. Spears included "Boys" on the setlist of her 2013–17 Las Vegas residency, Britney: Piece of Me. During this performance, she and her dancers wear neon outfits. Sophie Schillaci from MTV considered the performance "crowd-pleasing".

The song has been performed in a mashup with Justin Bieber's "Boyfriend" by Kevin McHale and Darren Criss (respectively as their characters Artie Abrams and Blaine Anderson) in the musical TV series Glee in the second episode of season four, "Britney 2.0" (aired on September 20, 2012), the show's second tribute episode to Spears.

== Track listings ==
- US 12-inch vinyl
1. "Boys" (Co-Ed remix) – 3:45
2. "Boys" (Co-Ed remix instrumental) – 3:45
3. "I'm a Slave 4 U" – 3:23
- UK CD and cassette single
1. "Boys" (Co-Ed remix) – 3:45
2. "Boys" (Co-Ed remix instrumental) – 3:45
3. "Boys" (album version) – 3:26
4. "Boys" (album version instrumental) – 3:26
- European CD single
1. "Boys" (Co-Ed remix) – 3:45
2. "Boys" (album version) – 3:26
- European, Japanese, Australian, New Zealand, and Brazilian CD maxi single
1. "Boys" (Co-Ed remix) – 3:45
2. "Boys" (Co-Ed remix instrumental) – 3:45
3. "Boys" (album version) – 3:26
4. "Boys" (album version instrumental) – 3:26

== Charts ==
=== Weekly charts ===
Weekly chart performance for "Boys"
Chart (2002)	Peak position
Australia (ARIA)	14
Austria (Ö3 Austria Top 40)	18
Belgium (Ultratop 50 Flanders)	7
Belgium (Ultratop 50 Wallonia)	10
Canada (Nielsen SoundScan)	21
Denmark (Tracklisten)	14
European Hot 100 Singles (Music & Media)	31
France (SNEP)	55
Germany (GfK)	19
Ireland (IRMA)	10
Italy (FIMI)	30
Japan (Oricon)	63
Netherlands (Dutch Top 40)	14
Netherlands (Single Top 100)	13
New Zealand (Recorded Music NZ)	39
Romania (Romanian Top 100)	94
Scottish Singles Sales (Official Charts)	7
Spain (Promusicae)	16
Sweden (Sverigetopplistan)	11
Switzerland (Schweizer Hitparade)	20
UK Singles (Official Charts)	7
UK Hip Hop/R&B (Official Charts)	2
UK Indie (Official Charts)	1
US Bubbling Under Hot 100 Singles (Billboard)	22
US Pop Airplay (Billboard)	32

=== Year-end charts ===
Year-end chart performance for "Boys"
Chart (2002)	Position
Belgium (Ultratop 50 Flanders)	73
Belgium (Ultratop 50 Wallonia)	76
Ireland (IRMA)	96
UK Singles (OCC)	141

== Certifications and sales ==
Certifications and sales for "Boys"
Region	Certification	Certified units/sales
Australia (ARIA)	Gold	35,000^{^}
France	—	20,898
^{^} Shipments figures based on certification alone.

== Release history ==
Release dates and formats for "Boys"
Region	Date	Format(s)	Label(s)	Ref.
United States	June 24, 2002	Contemporary hit radio; rhythmic contemporary radio	Maverick; Reprise	
United Kingdom	July 29, 2002	12-inch vinyl; maxi CD	Jive	
Japan	August 7, 2002	Maxi CD	Zomba	
Australia	September 2, 2002	Maxi CD	Zomba	
Germany	September 30, 2002	Maxi CD	Rough Trade	
France	October 22, 2002	CD	Jive	
