= Let's Dance (Slovak TV series) season 4 =

Let's Dance
- Season 4
- Presented by: Martin "Pyco" Rausch; Adela Banášová
- Judges: Jozef Bednárik; Tatiana Drexler; Dagmar Hubová; Zdeněk Chlopčík
- Celebrity winner: Nela Pocisková
- Professional winner: Peter Modrovský
- No. of episodes: 11

Release
- Original network: Markíza
- Original release: 21 March – 30 May 2010

Series chronology
- ← Previous; Season 3 Next → Season 5

Let's Dance aired its fourth series on Markíza from 21 March 2010 to 30 May 2010. The series was presented by Martin "Pyco" Rausch and Adela Banášová. The judging panel consisted of returning judges Jozef Bednárik, Tatiana Drexler and Dagmar Hubová, and Jan Ďurovčík was replaced by Zdeněk Chlopčík.

On 30 May 2010, singer and actress Nela Pocisková and Peter Modrovský were announced as the winners, while singer Eva Máziková and Štefan Čermák finished as the runners-up.

== Format ==
The couples dance each week in a live show. The judges score each performance out of ten. After all the couples have danced they are then ranked according to the judges' scores and given points according to their rank, with the highest ranked couple receiving a number of points equal to the number of couples dancing that week e.g. 7 points where there are seven couples dancing. When there are no tied scores the lowest scored couple will receive one point. However, in the event of a tie where two or more couples obtain the same judges score, the couple below those in the tie will be awarded one point below the points awarded to each of the tied couples. So, for example, if two couples obtain the same rank and obtain 7 points each, the couple immediately below them will be awarded 6 points. When couples are ranked equally by the judges the scoring of all other couples underneath will follow in the same descending order. Should there be any tied scores the lowest scored couple will therefore receive more than one point from the judges scores. The public are also invited to vote for their favourite couples, and the couples are ranked again according to the number of votes they receive, again receiving points; The couple with the most votes receiving the most points. Again in the unlikely event of a tie in the public vote the points are awarded in the same way as the points from the judges score.

The points for judges' score and public vote are then added together, and the two couples with the fewest points are placed in the bottom two. If two couples have equal points, the points from the public vote are given precedence. As with the previous series, the bottom two couples have to perform a dance-off on the results show. Based on that performance alone, each judge then votes on which couple should stay and which couple should leave. For the first time in the show's history, the casting vote was not made solely by the head judge in the dance-off and was instead rotated, with a different judge making the decision each week.

== Couples ==
The eleven couples featuring selected celebrities and their dancing partners:

Celebrity	Occupation / Known for	Dance partner	Status
Marek Vašut	Czech actor	Ivana Surovcová	Eliminated 1st on March 28, 2010
Štefan Skrúcaný	Actor, singer	Mirka Kosorínová	Eliminated 2nd on April 4, 2010
Andy Hryc	Actor	Michaela Marková	Eliminated 3rd on April 11, 2010
Roman Pomajbo	Actor, comedian	Natália Glosíková	Eliminated 4th on April 18, 2010
Simona Krainová	Czech model	Erik Ňarjaš	Withdrew on April 25, 2010
Elena Podzámska	Actress	Matej Chren	Eliminated 5th on May 2, 2010
Patrícia Vitteková	Singer	Milan Plačko	Eliminated 6th on May 9, 2010
Miroslav Šmajda	Singer	Katarína Štumpfová	Withdrew on May 16, 2010
Martina Šimkovičová	Newsreader	Tomáš Antálek	Eliminated 7th on May 23, 2010
Eva Máziková	Singer	Štefan Čermák	Runner-up on May 30, 2010
Nela Pocisková	Singer, actress	Peter Modrovský	Winner on May 30, 2010

== Scoring chart ==
The highest score each week is indicated in bold green with a dagger (†), while the lowest score each week is indicated in italicized red with a double-dagger (‡).

Color key:

Winners
Runners-up
Bottom two
Eliminated
Withdrew from competition

Let's Dance (season 4) - Weekly scores
Couple	Pl.	Week												
Couple	Pl.	1	2	1+2	3	4	5	6	7	6+7	8	9	10	11
Nela & Peter	1st	**22**†	**24**†	**46**†	22	22	**30**†	**35**†	**40**†	**75**†	36+35=**71**†	38+37=**75**†	33+40=**73**†	40+39+40=**119**†
Eva & Štefan	2nd	11	15	26	17	22	23	29	27	56	28+38=66	27+27=54‡	35+37=72	37+37+40=114‡
Martina & Tomáš	3rd	13	19	32	21	25	27	**35**†	32	67	32+32=64	35+38=73	31+37=68‡	
Miroslav & Katarína	4th	11	16	27	13‡	12‡	22	26‡	24‡	50‡	31+29=60	31+28=59		
Patrícia & Milan	5th	16	16	32	**24**†	18	**30**†	28	33	61	27+30=57‡			
Elena & Matej	6th	15	19	34	17	**29**†	28	34	29	63				
Simona & Erik	7th	13	15	28	22	23	25							
Roman & Natália	8th	14	20	34	18	21	18‡							
Andy & Michaela	9th	10‡	10‡	20‡	17	16								
Štefan & Mirka	10th	14	18	32	21									
Marek & Ivana	11th	11	15	26										

== Weekly scores ==
Unless indicated otherwise, individual judges scores in the charts below are given (in parentheses) in this order from left to right: Jozef Bednárik, Tatiana Drexler, Dagmar Hubová, Zdeněk Chlopčík.

=== Week 1 ===
Couples performed either the cha-cha-cha or the waltz, and are listed in the order they performed.

Couple	Scores	Dance	Music
Roman & Natália	14 (3,3,4,4)	Cha-cha-cha	"Sex Bomb" — Tom Jones
Štefan & Mirka	14 (5,4,3,2)	Waltz	"If I Ain't Got You" — Alicia Keys
Martina & Tomáš	13 (4,3,3,3)	Cha-cha-cha	"Sexual Revolution" — Macy Gray
Nela & Peter	22 (6,6,5,5)	Waltz	"Dark Waltz" — Hayley Westenra
Simona & Erik	13 (4,2,4,3)	Cha-cha-cha	"Sway" — Dean Martin
Marek & Ivana	11 (4,2,3,2)	Waltz	"Je suis malade" — Lara Fabian
Eva & Štefan	11 (3,3,4,1)	Cha-cha-cha	"I Need to Know" — Marc Anthony
Elena & Matej	15 (4,4,3,4)	Waltz	"See the Day" — Girls Aloud
Miroslav & Katarína	11 (3,3,2,3)	Cha-cha-cha	"P.Y.T. (Pretty Young Thing)" — Michael Jackson
Patrícia & Milan	16 (4,5,3,4)	Waltz	"Earth Song" — Michael Jackson
Andy & Michaela	10 (3,2,3,2)	Cha-cha-cha	"Down in Mexico" — The Coasters

=== Week 2 ===
Couples performed either the quickstep or the rumba, and are listed in the order they performed.

Couple	Scores	Dance	Music	Result
Simona & Erik	15 (4,4,4,3)	Quickstep	"The Way to Your Heart" — Soulsister	Bottom two
Patrícia & Milan	16 (4,4,4,4)	Rumba	"Take My Breath Away" — Berlin	Safe
Andy & Michaela	10 (4,2,2,2)	Quickstep	"Sing, Sing, Sing (with a Swing)" — Louis Prima	Safe
Marek & Ivana	15 (4,3,5,3)	Rumba	"Fields of Gold" — Sting	Eliminated
Roman & Natália	20 (5,5,5,5)	Quickstep	"Tu Vuò Fa' L'Americano" — Renato Carosone	Safe
Štefan & Mirka	18 (5,4,4,5)	Rumba	"Caruso" — Lucio Dalla	Safe
Martina & Tomáš	19 (6,5,5,3)	Quickstep	"I'm So Excited" — The Pointer Sisters	Safe
Nela & Peter	24 (6,6,6,6)	Rumba	"Father Figure" — George Michael	Safe
Miroslav & Katarína	16 (4,4,4,4)	Quickstep	"Billy-A-Dick" — Bette Midler	Safe
Elena & Matej	19 (6,5,5,3)	Rumba	"Comin' around" — Paola & Chiara	Safe
Eva & Štefan	15 (5,3,4,3)	Quickstep	"Good Lovin'" — The Olympics	Safe

Judges' votes to save

- Bednárik: Simona & Erik
- Drexler: Simona & Erik
- Hubová: Marek & Ivana
- Chlopčík: Simona & Erik

=== Week 3 ===
Couples performed either the jive or the tango, and are listed in the order they performed.

Couple	Scores	Dance	Music	Result
Elena & Matej	17 (5,4,4,4)	Tango	"Please Mr. Brown" — Sarah Vaughan	Safe
Miroslav & Katarína	13 (4,3,4,2)	Jive	"Jailhouse Rock" — Elvis Presley	Safe
Štefan & Mirka	21 (6,5,5,5)	Tango	"Por una cabeza" — Carlos Gardel	Eliminated
Roman & Natália	18 (4,4,4,6)	Jive	"Land of a Thousand Dances" — Wilson Pickett	Bottom two
Simona & Erik	22 (6,6,5,5)	Tango	"Tanguera" — Mariano Mores	Safe
Andy & Michaela	17 (5,5,4,3)	Jive	"The Boy Does Nothing" — Alesha Dixon	Safe
Patrícia & Milan	24 (5,6,6,7)	Tango	"Libertango" — Astor Piazzolla	Safe
Eva & Štefan	17 (6,4,4,3)	Jive	"Mambo Rock" — Bill Haley	Safe
Nela & Peter	22 (6,6,6,4)	Tango	"El Tango de Roxanne" — The Police	Safe
Martina & Tomáš	21 (6,5,5,5)	Jive	"Long Tall Sally" — Little Richard	Safe

Judges' votes to save

- Bednárik: Roman & Natália
- Drexler: Štefan & Mirka
- Hubová: Roman & Natália
- Chlopčík: Roman & Natália

=== Week 4 ===
Couples performed either the slowfox or the paso doble, and are listed in the order they performed.

Couple	Scores	Dance	Music	Result
Patrícia & Milan	18 (4,5,5,4)	Paso doble	"España cañí" — Pascual Marquina	Safe
Miroslav & Katarína	12 (4,3,3,2)	Slowfox	"Nasty Naughty Boy" — Christina Aguilera	Safe
Nela & Peter	22 (7,6,5,4)	Paso doble	"Olé España" — Tanz Orchester Klaus Hallen	Safe
Andy & Michaela	16 (5,4,4,3)	Slowfox	"The Addams Family theme" — The Addams Family	Eliminated
Martina & Tomáš	25 (6,6,7,6)	Slowfox	"Fever" — Little Willie John	Safe
Roman & Natália	21 (5,4,5,7)	Slowfox	"I Wanna Be Loved by You" — Marilyn Monroe	Bottom two
Elena & Matej	29 (8,7,7,7)	Paso doble	"Malagueña" — Ernesto Lecuona	Safe
Eva & Štefan	22 (7,5,5,5)	Slowfox	"Raindrops Keep Fallin' on My Head" — B. J. Thomas	Safe
Simona & Erik	23 (7,6,6,4)	Paso doble	"Scott & Fran's Paso Doble" — David Hirschfelder	Safe

Judges' votes to save

- Bednárik: Andy & Michaela
- Drexler: Roman & Natália
- Hubová: Roman & Natália
- Chlopčík: Roman & Natália

=== Week 5 ===
Couples performed the samba, and are listed in the order they performed.

Couple	Scores	Dance	Music	Result
Nela & Peter	30 (8,8,7,7)	Samba	"You'll Be Mine (Party Time)" — Gloria Estefan	Safe
Martina & Tomáš	27 (7,7,7,6)	Samba	"La Vida Es Un Carnaval" — Celia Cruz	Safe
Roman & Natália	18 (6,5,4,3)	Samba	"Swing da Cor" — Daniela Mercury	Eliminated
Elena & Matej	28 (8,7,7,6)	Samba	"Bamboléo" — Gipsy Kings	Safe
Simona & Erik	25 (7,7,6,5)	Samba	"La Isla Bonita" — Madonna	Bottom two
Patrícia & Milan	30 (7,7,7,9)	Samba	"Pa´ Mi Guerrera" — Huecco	Safe
Miroslav & Katarína	22 (7,6,5,4)	Samba	"Lolo jama" — Dan Nekonečný	Safe
Eva & Štefan	23 (7,6,6,4)	Samba	"In the Mood" — Glenn Miller	Safe

Judges' votes to save

- Bednárik: Simona & Erik
- Drexler: Simona & Erik
- Hubová: Simona & Erik
- Chlopčík: Simona & Erik

=== Week 6 ===
Each couple performed an unlearned dance, and are listed in the order they performed.

After dancing the rumba, Simona Krainová announced that due to problems with her leg she had to withdraw from the show. Later, it turned out that she withdrew because of pregnancy.

Couple	Scores	Dance	Music	Result
Miroslav & Katarína	26 (8,7,6,5)	Rumba	"No More "I Love You's"" — The Lover Speaks	Safe
Elena & Matej	34 (8,8,9,9)	Slowfox	"Fly Me to the Moon" — Kaye Ballard	Safe
Nela & Peter	35 (8,9,10,8)	Jive	"Come So Far (Got So Far To Go)" — Hairspray	Safe
Martina & Tomáš	35 (9,9,9,8)	Tango	"Sombras" — Ballroom Orchestra	Safe
Eva & Štefan	29 (8,7,7,7)	Tango	"Tango in the Park" — Randy Edelman	Safe
Patrícia & Milan	28 (7,7,7,7)	Slowfox	"Love and Marriage" — Frank Sinatra	Safe
Simona & Erik	N/A	Rumba	"I Will Survive" — Gloria Gaynor	Withdrew

=== Week 7 ===
Each couple performed an unlearned dance, and are listed in the order they performed.

Couple	Scores	Dance	Music	Result
Elena & Matej	29 (8,7,8,6)	Cha-cha-cha	"Quizás, Quizás, Quizás" — Osvaldo Farrés	Eliminated
Miroslav & Katarína	24 (7,6,6,5)	Tango	"Reflejo De Luna" — Paco de Lucía Básicos	Bottom two
Martina & Tomáš	32 (8,7,9,8)	Rumba	"She's the One" — World Party	Safe
Patrícia & Milan	33 (8,8,9,8)	Cha-cha-cha	"Suavemente" — Elvis Crespo	Safe
Nela & Peter	40 (10,10,10,10)	Quickstep	"Walking on Sunshine" — Katrina and the Waves	Safe
Eva & Štefan	27 (8,7,7,5)	Rumba	"(Where Do I Begin?) Love Story" — Andy Williams	Safe

Judges' votes to save

- Bednárik: Miroslav & Katarína
- Drexler: Miroslav & Katarína
- Hubová: Elena & Matej
- Chlopčík: Elena & Matej

=== Week 8 ===
Each couple performed the salsa and one unlearned ballroom dance, and are listed in the order they performed.

Couple	Scores	Dance	Music	Result
Martina & Tomáš	32 (8,8,8,8)	Salsa	"La-33" — Orquesta La 33	Bottom two
Martina & Tomáš	32 (8,8,8,8)	Waltz	"It Is You (I Have Loved) " — Dana Glover	Bottom two
Miroslav & Katarína	31 (8,8,7,8)	Waltz	"Until It's Time for You to Go" — Buffy Sainte-Marie	Safe
Miroslav & Katarína	29 (8,7,7,7)	Salsa	"Aguanilé" — Marc Anthony	Safe
Patrícia & Milan	27 (7,7,7,6)	Salsa	"Can't Buy Me Love" — The Beatles	Eliminated
Patrícia & Milan	30 (8,8,8,6)	Quickstep	"Puttin' On the Ritz" — Harry Richman	Eliminated
Eva & Štefan	28 (9,7,7,5)	Waltz	"Love Theme from The Godfather" — The Godfather	Safe
Eva & Štefan	38 (10,9,9,10)	Salsa	"Micaela" — Sonora Carruseles	Safe
Nela & Peter	36 (9,9,9,9)	Salsa	"Se le ve" — Andy Montañez	Safe
Nela & Peter	35 (9,9,9,8)	Slowfox	"Theme from New York, New York" — Liza Minnelli	Safe

Judges' votes to save

- Bednárik: Martina & Tomáš
- Drexler: Martina & Tomáš
- Hubová: Martina & Tomáš
- Chlopčík: Martina & Tomáš

=== Week 9 ===
Each couple performed a redemption Standard dance and an unlearned Latin routine, and are listed in the order they performed.

During the results show, Miroslav Šmajda stated that he wanted to withdraw because he believes the remaining contestants, especially Nela, deserve to advance more than he does. This was met with significant confusion from the audience in the hall, the judges, and his dance partner Katarína Štumpfová. After the commercial break, it was confirmed that he was withdrawing. It was also announced that, under normal circumstances, the eliminated pair would have been Martina Šimkovičová and Tomáš Antálek.

Couple	Scores	Dance	Music	Result
Nela & Peter	38 (10,10,9,9)	Tango	"Asi Se Baila El Tango" — Veronica Verdier	Safe
Nela & Peter	37 (9,10,9,9)	Cha-cha-cha	"Unchain My Heart" — Ray Charles	Safe
Miroslav & Katarína	31 (9,8,8,6)	Quickstep	"DuckTales Theme" — DuckTales	Withdrew
Miroslav & Katarína	28 (8,8,7,5)	Paso doble	"Eye of the Tiger" — Survivor	Withdrew
Martina & Tomáš	35 (9,9,9,8)	Paso doble	"España cañí" — Pascual Marquina	Safe
Martina & Tomáš	38 (10,10,9,9)	Quickstep	"Déjà Vu" — Beyoncé	Safe
Eva & Štefan	27 (8,7,6,6)	Paso doble	"Spanish Matador" — Paso Doble / 62 BPM	Safe
Eva & Štefan	27 (8,6,6,7)	Quickstep	"Mack the Knife" — Kurt Weill	Safe

=== Week 10: Semi-finals ===
Each couple performed the Argentine tango and a relay consisting of 2 Latin dances, and are listed in the order they performed.

Couple	Scores	Dance	Music	Result
Martina & Tomáš	31 (8,8,8,7)	Argentine tango	"La yumba" — Osvaldo Pugliese	Eliminated
Martina & Tomáš	37 (9,10,9,9)	Samba/Jive relay	"Que la Detengan" & "Don't Wanna be Your Man" — David Civera / Dj The Beat Vs Rod D	Eliminated
Nela & Peter	33 (9,9,8,7)	Rumba/Samba relay	"Somos un mundo" & "Mas que nada" — OV7 / Jorge Ben	Safe
Nela & Peter	40 (10,10,10,10)	Argentine tango	"Latin Tango" — Rodrigo Favela	Safe
Eva & Štefan	35 (10,9,7,9)	Argentine tango	"El Choclo" — Lalo Schifrin	Safe
Eva & Štefan	37 (9,8,10,10)	Samba/Jive relay	"Jump in the Line (Shake, Senora)" & "Bad, Bad Leroy Brown" — Harry Belafonte / Jim Croce	Safe

=== Week 11: Finale ===
Each couple performed 3 routines: their samba, a Viennese waltz and their freestyle routine. Couples are listed in the order they performed.

Couple	Scores	Dance	Music	Result
Nela & Peter	40 (10,10,10,10)	Samba	"You'll Be Mine (Party Time)" — Gloria Estefan	Winners
Nela & Peter	39 (10,9,10,10)	Viennese waltz	"Cigaretka na dva ťahy" — Richard Müller	Winners
Nela & Peter	40 (10,10,10,10)	Freestyle	"Shout" — The Isley Brothers	Winners
Eva & Štefan	37 (9,10,9,9)	Samba	"In the Mood" — Glenn Miller	Runners-up
Eva & Štefan	37 (9,9,9,10)	Viennese waltz	"Hedwig's Theme" — John Williams	Runners-up
Eva & Štefan	40 (10,10,10,10)	Freestyle	"I Will Survive" & "Iná žena" — Gloria Gaynor / Eva Máziková	Runners-up

== Dance chart ==
The couples performed the following each week:

- Week 1: One unlearned dance (cha-cha-cha or waltz)
- Week 2: One unlearned dance (quickstep or rumba)
- Week 3: One unlearned dance (jive or tango)
- Week 4: One unlearned dance (slowfox or paso doble)
- Week 5: Samba
- Week 6: One unlearned dance
- Week 7: One unlearned dance
- Week 8: One unlearned Standard dance & salsa
- Week 9: One unlearned Latin routine and redemption Standard routine
- Week 10: Argentine tango & Latin relay
- Week 11: Viennese waltz, week 5 samba and freestyle routine

Let's Dance (season 4) - Dance chart
Couple	Week															
Couple	1	2	3	4	5	6	7	8		9		10		11		
Nela & Peter	Waltz	Rumba	Tango	Paso doble	Samba	Jive	Quickstep	Salsa	Slowfox	Tango	Cha-cha-cha	Rumba/Samba relay	Argentine tango	Samba	Viennese waltz	Freestyle
Eva & Štefan	Cha-cha-cha	Quickstep	Jive	Slowfox	Samba	Tango	Rumba	Waltz	Salsa	Paso doble	Quickstep	Argentine tango	Samba/Jive relay	Samba	Viennese waltz	Freestyle
Martina & Tomáš	Cha-cha-cha	Quickstep	Jive	Slowfox	Samba	Tango	Rumba	Salsa	Waltz	Paso doble	Quickstep	Argentine tango	Samba/Jive relay			
Miroslav & Katarína	Cha-cha-cha	Quickstep	Jive	Slowfox	Samba	Rumba	Tango	Waltz	Salsa	Quickstep	Paso doble					
Patrícia & Milan	Waltz	Rumba	Tango	Paso doble	Samba	Slowfox	Cha-cha-cha	Salsa	Quickstep							
Elena & Matej	Waltz	Rumba	Tango	Paso doble	Samba	Slowfox	Cha-cha-cha									
Simona & Erik	Cha-cha-cha	Quickstep	Tango	Paso doble	Samba	Rumba										
Roman & Natália	Cha-cha-cha	Quickstep	Jive	Slowfox	Samba											
Andy & Michaela	Cha-cha-cha	Quickstep	Jive	Slowfox												
Štefan & Mirka	Waltz	Rumba	Tango													
Marek & Ivana	Waltz	Rumba														
