= Let's Dance (Slovak TV series) season 7 =

Series of Dancing Competition on television

Let's Dance
- Season 7
- Presented by: Viktor Vincze; Martina Zábranská
- Judges: Jorge González; Tatiana Drexler; Adela Vinczeová; Ján Ďurovčík
- Celebrity winner: Ján Koleník
- Professional winner: Vanda Poláková
- No. of episodes: 10

Release
- Original network: Markíza
- Original release: 6 March – 8 May 2022

Series chronology
- ← Previous; Season 6 Next → Season 8

Let's Dance aired its seventh series on Markíza from 6 March 2022 to 8 May 2022 after a 5-year hiatus. The series was presented by Viktor Vincze and co-hosted by Martina Zábranská. The judging panel consisted of Jorge González, Tatiana Drexler, Adela Vinczeová and Ján Ďurovčík.

On 8 May 2022, actor Ján Koleník and Vanda Poláková were announced as the winners, while actor Adam Bardy and Dominika Rošková finished as the runners-up and actress and comedian Zuzana Kubovčíková Šebová and Vilém Šír finished in third place.

== Format ==
The couples dance each week in a live show. The judges score each performance out of ten. After all the couples have danced they are then ranked according to the judges' scores and given points according to their rank, with the highest ranked couple receiving a number of points equal to the number of couples dancing that week e.g. 7 points where there are seven couples dancing. When there are no tied scores the lowest scored couple will receive one point. However, in the event of a tie where two or more couples obtain the same judges score, the couple below those in the tie will be awarded one point below the points awarded to each of the tied couples. So, for example, if two couples obtain the same rank and obtain 7 points each, the couple immediately below them will be awarded 6 points. When couples are ranked equally by the judges the scoring of all other couples underneath will follow in the same descending order. Should there be any tied scores the lowest scored couple will therefore receive more than one point from the judges scores. The public are also invited to vote for their favourite couples, and the couples are ranked again according to the number of votes they receive, again receiving points; The couple with the most votes receiving the most points. Again in the unlikely event of a tie in the public vote the points are awarded in the same way as the points from the judges score.

== Couples ==
The eleven couples featuring selected celebrities and their dancing partners:

Celebrity	Occupation / Known for	Dance partner	Status
Marek Fašiang	Actor	Adriana Mašková	Eliminated 1st on March 13, 2022
František "Fero Joke" Košarišťan	Comedian	Vanesa Indrová	Eliminated 2nd on March 20, 2022
Viktória "Aicha" Niang	Love Island contestant	Fabio Belluci	Eliminated 3rd on March 27, 2022
Michal Kovačič	TV Presenter	Simona Brecíková; Vanesa Indrová (week 5)	Eliminated 4th on April 3, 2022
Diana Mórová	Actress	Marek Bureš	Eliminated 5th on April 10, 2022
Kristína Svarinská	Actress	Marek Klič	Eliminated 6th on April 17, 2022
Dominika Cibulková	Tennis Player	Róbert Pavlík	Eliminated 7th on April 24, 2022
Attila Végh	MMA wrestler	Eliška Lenčešová	Eliminated 8th on May 1, 2022
Zuzana Šebová	Actress	Vilem Šír	Third Place on May 8, 2022
Adam Bardy	Actor, Honour Guard of the President	Dominika Rošková	Runner-up on May 8, 2022
Ján Koleník	Actor	Vanda Poláková	Winner on May 8, 2022

== Scoring chart ==
The highest score each week is indicated in bold green with a dagger (†), while the lowest score each week is indicated in italicized red with a double-dagger (‡).

Color key:

Winners
Runners-up
Third place
Bottom two
Eliminated

Let's Dance (season 7) - Weekly scores
Couple	Pl.	Week										
Couple	Pl.	1	2	1+2	3	4	5	6	7	8	9	10
Ján & Vanda	1st	**32**†	28	**60**†	**38**†	**37**†	39+29=**68**†	39+7=**46**†	36+37=**73**†	37+40=**77**†	40+39=**79**†	40+40+40=**120**†
Adam & Dominika	2nd	21	22	43	28	18	35+29=64	32+3=35	25+37=62	29+39=68	35+40=75	37+40+39=116
Zuzana & Vilém	3rd	21	28	49	25	23	34+29=63	31+5=36	37+31=68	34+35=69	39+36=75	35+40+40=115‡
Attila & Eliška	4th	17	15	32	23	14‡	29+29=58	18+6=24	30+27=57	26+26=52‡	28+34=62‡	
Dominika & Róbert	5th	21	16	37	20	31	24+29=53	22+1=23‡	25+31=56	25+29=54		
Kristína & Marek K.	6th	19	28	47	24	31	25+29=54	25+2=27	27+27=54‡			
Diana & Marek B.	7th	23	**31**†	54	31	16	33+29=62	25+4=29				
Michal & Simona	8th	11‡	20	31‡	16‡	26	20+29=49‡					
Aicha & Fabio	9th	14	28	42	31	18						
Fero Joke & Vanesa	10th	15	21	36	20							
Marek & Adriana	11th	18	14‡	32								

== Weekly scores ==
Unless indicated otherwise, individual judges scores in the charts below are given (in parentheses) in this order from left to right: Jorge González, Tatiana Drexler, Adela Vinczeová, Ján Ďurovčík.

=== Week 1 ===
Opening number: "I Wanna Dance With Somebody" – Whitney Houston

Couples performed one unlearned routine, and are listed in the order they performed.

Couple	Scores	Dance	Music
Attila & Eliška	17 (5,4,5,3)	Quickstep	"I'm So Excited" — The Pointer Sisters
Kristína & Marek K.	19 (4,5,6,4)	Waltz	"Your Song" — Elton John
Diana & Marek B.	23 (6,6,7,4)	Quickstep	"The Hollywood Wiz" — Cirque du Soleil
Fero Joke & Vanesa	15 (4,4,5,2)	Cha-cha-cha	"Sex Bomb" — Tom Jones
Aicha & Fabio	14 (4,3,5,2)	Rumba	"Dusk Till Dawn" — Zayn Malik ft. Sia
Zuzana & Vilém	21 (5,5,6,5)	Cha-cha-cha	"Think" — Aretha Franklin
Adam & Dominika	21 (6,6,6,3)	Rumba	"Thinking Out Loud" — Ed Sheeran
Michal & Simona	11 (3,2,4,2)	Quickstep	"Tu vuò fà l'americano" — Renato Carosone
Dominika & Róbert	21 (6,5,6,4)	Waltz	"Make You Feel My Love" — Adele
Marek & Adriana	18 (5,5,6,2)	Rumba	"She's the One" — Robbie Williams
Ján & Vanda	32 (9,9,8,6)	Cha-cha-cha	"Beggin'" — Måneskin

=== Week 2 ===
Couples performed one unlearned routine, and are listed in the order they performed.

Couple	Scores	Dance	Music	Result
Adam & Dominika	22 (6,5,7,4)	Quickstep	"Sing, Sing, Sing (with a Swing)" — Benny Goodman	Safe
Fero Joke & Vanesa	21 (6,6,6,3)	Waltz	"Earth Song" — Michael Jackson	Safe
Dominika & Róbert	16 (5,3,5,3)	Cha-cha-cha	"Let's Get Loud" — Jennifer Lopez	Safe
Attila & Eliška	15 (5,3,5,2)	Cha-cha-cha	"Muž číslo 1" — Marie Rottrová	Safe
Zuzana & Vilém	28 (7,7,8,6)	Waltz	"If I Ain't Got You" — Alicia Keys	Safe
Marek & Adriana	14 (4,3,4,3)	Quickstep	"Walking on Sunshine" — Katrina and the Waves	Eliminated
Diana & Marek B.	31 (9,7,8,7)	Rumba	"Run to You" — Whitney Houston	Safe
Kristína & Marek K.	28 (7,7,8,6)	Cha-cha-cha	"Uptown Funk" — Mark Ronson ft. Bruno Mars	Safe
Michal & Simona	20 (5,5,6,4)	Rumba	"Shape of My Heart" — Sting	Safe
Ján & Vanda	28 (7,7,7,7)	Quickstep	"The Ballroom Blitz" — The Sweet	Safe
Aicha & Fabio	28 (7,8,8,5)	Waltz	"Come Away with Me" — Norah Jones	Safe

=== Week 3: Movie Night ===
Couples performed one unlearned routine, and are listed in the order they performed.

Couple	Scores	Dance	Music	Movie	Result
Zuzana & Vilém	25 (7,6,7,5)	Jive	"Greased Lightnin'"	Grease	Safe
Adam & Dominika	28 (6,7,8,7)	Tango	"The Phantom of the Opera"	The Phantom of the Opera	Safe
Dominika & Róbert	20 (5,5,6,4)	Rumba	"Shallow"	A Star Is Born	Safe
Kristína & Marek K.	24 (6,6,7,5)	Jive	"Maniac"	Flashdance	Safe
Diana & Marek B.	31 (8,8,8,7)	Waltz	"Schindler's List: Soundtrack"	Schindler's List	Safe
Fero Joke & Vanesa	20 (5,6,6,3)	Jive	"Happy"	Minions	Eliminated
Aicha & Fabio	31 (8,8,9,6)	Tango	"Oh, Pretty Woman"	Pretty Woman	Safe
Attila & Eliška	23 (6,5,7,5)	Waltz	"Gladiator Theme Song"	Gladiator	Safe
Michal & Simona	16 (4,4,5,3)	Samba	"Stayin' Alive"	Saturday Night Fever	Safe
Ján & Vanda	38 (10,10,9,9)	Rumba	"Writing's on the Wall"	Spectre	Safe

=== Week 4 ===
Opening number: "What a Feeling" - Alex Gaudino

Couples performed one unlearned routine, and are listed in the order they performed.

Couple	Scores	Dance	Music	Result
Diana & Marek B.	16 (4,4,5,3)	Jive	"Proud Mary" — Tina Turner	Safe
Michal & Simona	26 (7,7,7,5)	Viennese waltz	"Pokoj v duši" — Jana Kirschner	Safe
Aicha & Fabio	18 (5,4,5,4)	Cha-cha-cha	"Gonna Make You Sweat" — C+C Music Factory	Eliminated
Zuzana & Vilém	23 (6,5,6,6)	Slowfox	"I Wanna Be Loved by You" — Marilyn Monroe	Safe
Attila & Eliška	14 (4,3,5,2)	Jive	"Jailhouse Rock" — Elvis Presley	Safe
Dominika & Róbert	31 (8,8,9,6)	Tango	"La cumparsita" — Gerardo Matos Rodríguez	Safe
Ján & Vanda	37 (9,9,10,9)	Slowfox	"New York, New York" — Frank Sinatra	Safe
Adam & Dominika	18 (5,5,5,3)	Cha-cha-cha	"Hot Stuff" — Donna Summer	Safe
Kristína & Marek K.	31 (8,8,8,7)	Viennese waltz	"The Blue Danube" — Johann Strauss II	Safe

=== Week 5 ===
Opening number: "Libertango"

Due to testing positive for COVID-19, Michal Kovačič's partner Simona Brecíková was replaced by Fero Joke's former partner Vanesa Indrová.

Couples performed one unlearned routine and groupe salsa, and are listed in the order they performed.

Couple	Scores	Dance	Music	Result
Kristína & Marek K.	25 (7,6,7,5)	Paso doble	"Bella ciao" — Manu Pilas	Safe
Adam & Dominika	35 (9,9,10,7)	Waltz	"Je suis malade" — Lara Fabian	Safe
Attila & Eliška	29 (8,6,9,6)	Tango	"El Tango de Roxanne" — The Police	Safe
Zuzana & Vilém	34 (9,9,9,7)	Paso doble	"Smooth Criminal" — Michael Jackson	Safe
Michal & Vanesa	20 (5,5,6,4)	Cha-cha-cha	"Corazón Espinado" — Santana ft. Maná	Eliminated
Dominika & Róbert	24 (6,6,7,5)	Jive	"Don't Stop Me Now" — Queen	Safe
Ján & Vanda	39 (10,10,10,9)	Paso doble	"España cañí" — Pascual Marquina	Safe
Diana & Marek B.	33 (8,9,9,7)	Argentine tango	"Por una cabeza" — Carlos Gardel	Safe
Kristína & Marek K. Zuzana & Vilém Dominika & Róbert Diana & Marek B.	29 (8,7,8,6)	Salsa (Team Girls)	"Conga" — Gloria Estefan	
Adam & Dominika Attila & Eliška Michal & Vanesa Ján & Vanda	29 (7,7,8,7)	Salsa (Team Boys)	"María" — Ricky Martin	

=== Week 6 - Carnival ===
Opening number: "Que Calor"/"Real in Rio"

Couples performed samba and bachata marathon, and are listed in the order they performed.

Couple	Scores	Dance	Music	Result
Zuzana & Vilém	31 (8,7,9,7)	Samba	"Magalenha" — Sérgio Mendes	Safe
Diana & Marek B.	25 (6,6,7,6)	Samba	"La Bamba" — Los Lobos	Eliminated
Attila & Eliška	18 (5,4,6,3)	Samba	"Iko Iko (My Bestie)" — Justin Wellington ft. Small Jan	Safe
Kristína & Marek K.	25 (6,6,7,6)	Samba	"Whenever, Wherever" — Shakira	Safe
Ján & Vanda	39 (10,10,10,9)	Samba	"Lady Carneval" — Karel Gott	Safe
Dominika & Róbert	22 (6,5,6,5)	Samba	"Samba de Janeiro" — Bellini	Safe
Adam & Dominika	32 (9,9,9,5)	Samba	"Nel blu, dipinto di blu" — Gipsy Kings	Safe
Dominika & Róbert	1	Bachata; Marathon	"Be My Baby" — Leslie Grace	
Kristína & Marek K.	2	Bachata; Marathon	"Be My Baby" — Leslie Grace	
Adam & Dominika	3	Bachata; Marathon	"Be My Baby" — Leslie Grace	
Diana & Marek B.	4	Bachata; Marathon	"Be My Baby" — Leslie Grace	
Zuzana & Vilém	5	Bachata; Marathon	"Be My Baby" — Leslie Grace	
Attila & Eliška	6	Bachata; Marathon	"Be My Baby" — Leslie Grace	
Ján & Vanda	7	Bachata; Marathon	"Be My Baby" — Leslie Grace	

=== Week 7 ===
Opening number: "Goral" - Slavonix
Special performance: TECHNIK - STU

Couples performed one unlearned routine and groupe Folk dance, and are listed in the order they performed.

Couple	Scores	Dance	Music	Result
Dominika & Róbert	25 (7,5,7,6)	Slowfox	"Back to Black" — Amy Winehouse	Safe
Attila & Eliška	30 (8,7,9,6)	Paso doble	"Malagueña" — Connie Francis	Safe
Kristína & Marek K.	27 (6,6,8,7)	Slowfox	"Señorita" — Shawn Mendes & Camila Cabello	Eliminated
Adam & Dominika	25 (6,6,8,5)	Jive	"Hey Ya!" — OutKast	Safe
Ján & Vanda	36 (9,9,9,9)	Tango	"Santa Maria" — Gotan Project	Safe
Zuzana & Vilém	37 (10,9,10,8)	Quickstep	"Can't Hurry Love" — Phil Collins	Safe
Attila & Eliška Kristína & Marek K.	27 (7,5,8,7)	Myjava folk dance		
Zuzana & Vilém Dominika & Róbert	31 (8,7,8,8)	Fľaškový tanec folk dance		
Ján & Vanda Adam & Dominika	37 (10,9,9,9)	Očová folk dance		

=== Week 8 ===
Guest performance: "Moving On" – ADONXS

Couples performed one unlearned Standard routine and Contemporary, and are listed in the order they performed.

Couple	Scores	Dance	Music	Result
Attila & Eliška	26 (6,7,7,6)	Slowfox	"L'Italiano" — Toto Cutugno	Safe
Attila & Eliška	26 (6,7,7,6)	Contemporary	"Take Me To Church" — Hozier	Safe
Zuzana & Vilém	34 (9,8,9,8)	Contemporary	"Hold Back the River" — James Bay	Safe
Zuzana & Vilém	35 (9,8,9,9)	Tango	"Sweet Dreams (Are Made of This)" — Eurythmics	Safe
Ján & Vanda	37 (10,9,9,9)	Viennese waltz	"Harry Potter Theme" — Harry Potter	Safe
Ján & Vanda	40 (10,10,10,10)	Contemporary	"Arcade" — Duncan Laurence	Safe
Dominika & Róbert	25 (6,6,7,6)	Contemporary	"Six Feet Under" — Billie Eilish	Eliminated
Dominika & Róbert	29 (7,7,8,7)	Viennese waltz	"You Are The Reason" — Calum Scott ft. Leona Lewis	Eliminated
Adam & Dominika	29 (7,7,8,7)	Slowfox	"Singin' in the Rain" — Gene Kelly	Safe
Adam & Dominika	39 (10,10,10,9)	Contemporary	"Sail" — Awolnation	Safe

=== Week 9: Semi-final ===
Guest performance: Cigánski diabli and Slovenské divadlo tanca

This evening featured the dance-off for the first time. Two couples with the lowest overall points went head-to-head in the dance-off. The judges then picked the final couple to make it to the Top 3.

Couples performed two unlearned routines, and are listed in the order they performed.

Couple	Scores	Dance	Music	Result
Adam & Dominika	35 (9,9,9,8)	Viennese waltz	"I Have Nothing" — Whitney Houston	Bottom two
Adam & Dominika	40 (10,10,10,10)	Paso doble	"Explosive" — Bond	Bottom two
Attila & Eliška	28 (7,7,8,6)	Rumba	"You Can Leave Your Hat On" — Joe Cocker	Bottom two
Attila & Eliška	34 (8,8,10,8)	Waltz	"Hallelujah" — Leonard Cohen	Bottom two
Zuzana & Vilém	39 (10,10,10,9)	Viennese waltz	"Léto" — Iveta Bartošová	Safe
Zuzana & Vilém	36 (9,9,9,9)	Rumba	"Ain't No Sunshine" — Bill Withers	Safe
Ján & Vanda	40 (10,10,10,10)	Jive	"Perm/Runaway Baby" — Bruno Mars	Safe
Ján & Vanda	39 (10,10,10,9)	Waltz	"My Love" — Sia	Safe

Dance-off

Couple	Dance	Music	Result
Adam & Dominika	Tango	"El Choclo" - Ángel Villoldo	Advanced
Attila & Eliška	Tango	"El Choclo" - Ángel Villoldo	Eliminated

=== Week 10: Finale ===
Opening performance: Class of 2022; "Let's Go" – Tiësto

The remaining couples each performed 3 dances, one chosen by the judges, one of which they've previously performed and their freestyle.

Couple	Scores	Dance	Music	Result
Adam & Dominika	37 (9,9,10,9)	Rumba	"I See Fire" — Ed Sheeran	Runners-up
Adam & Dominika	40 (10,10,10,10)	Waltz	"Je suis malade" — Lara Fabian	Runners-up
Adam & Dominika	39 (10,10,10,9)	Freestyle	"They Don't Care About Us" — Michael Jackson	Runners-up
Ján & Vanda	40 (10,10,10,10)	Tango	"Libertango" — Astor Piazzolla	Winners
Ján & Vanda	40 (10,10,10,10)	Cha-cha-cha	"Beggin'" — Måneskin	Winners
Ján & Vanda	40 (10,10,10,10)	Freestyle	"Milovanie v daždi" — Richard Müller	Winners
Zuzana & Vilém	35 (9,8,9,9)	Samba	"DJ Ice" — Willy William	Third place
Zuzana & Vilém	40 (10,10,10,10)	Quickstep	"Can't Hurry Love" — Phil Collins	Third place
Zuzana & Vilém	40 (10,10,10,10)	Freestyle	"Deja Vu" — Shakira ft. Prince Royce	Third place

== Dance chart ==
The couples performed the following each week: The couples performed the following each week:

- Weeks 1–4: One unlearned dance
- Week 5: One unlearned dance and group Salsa
- Week 6: Samba and Bachata Marathon
- Week 7: One unlearned dance and group Folk dance
- Week 8: One unlearned Standard dance and Contemporary
- Week 9: Two unlearned dances
- Week 10: Judge's choice, favorite dance and freestyle routine

Let's Dance (season 7) - Dance chart
Couple	Week																
Couple	1	2	3	4	5		6		7		8		9		10		
Ján & Vanda	Cha-cha-cha	Quickstep	Rumba	Slowfox	Paso doble	Salsa	Samba	Bachata Marathon	Tango	Folk dance	Viennese waltz	Contemporary	Jive	Waltz	Tango	Cha-cha-cha	Freestyle
Adam & Dominika	Rumba	Quickstep	Tango	Cha-cha-cha	Waltz	Salsa	Samba	Bachata Marathon	Jive	Folk dance	Slowfox	Contemporary	Viennese waltz	Paso doble	Rumba	Waltz	Freestyle
Zuzana & Vilém	Cha-cha-cha	Waltz	Jive	Slowfox	Paso doble	Salsa	Samba	Bachata Marathon	Quickstep	Folk dance	Contemporary	Tango	Viennese waltz	Rumba	Samba	Quickstep	Freestyle
Attila & Eliška	Quickstep	Cha-cha-cha	Waltz	Jive	Tango	Salsa	Samba	Bachata Marathon	Paso doble	Folk dance	Slowfox	Contemporary	Rumba	Waltz			
Dominika & Róbert	Waltz	Cha-cha-cha	Rumba	Tango	Jive	Salsa	Samba	Bachata Marathon	Slowfox	Folk dance	Contemporary	Viennese waltz					
Kristína & Marek K.	Waltz	Cha-cha-cha	Jive	Viennese waltz	Paso doble	Salsa	Samba	Bachata Marathon	Slowfox	Folk dance							
Diana & Marek B.	Quickstep	Rumba	Waltz	Jive	Argentine tango	Salsa	Samba	Bachata Marathon									
Michal & Simona	Quickstep	Rumba	Samba	Viennese waltz	Cha-cha-cha	Salsa											
Aicha & Fabio	Rumba	Waltz	Tango	Cha-cha-cha													
Fero Joke & Vanesa	Cha-cha-cha	Waltz	Jive														
Marek & Adriana	Rumba	Quickstep															
