= Austin Powers: International Man of Mystery (soundtrack) =

1997 soundtrack album by various artists

Austin Powers: International Man of Mystery (Original Soundtrack)

Soundtrack album by various artists
- Released: April 15, 1997
- Recorded: 1996–1997
- Genre: Rock; pop; jazz
- Length: 62:37
- Label: Hollywood

Austin Powers series chronology
Austin Powers: International Man of Mystery (1997)	Austin Powers: The Spy Who Shagged Me (1999)

Austin Powers: International Man of Mystery (Original Soundtrack) is the soundtrack album to the 1997 film Austin Powers: International Man of Mystery released through Hollywood Records on April 15, 1997. The album accompanied selections of rock, pop and jazz music featured in the film. The album was certified "Gold" by the Recording Industry Association of America for selling 500,000 units in the United States, and certified "Silver" by the British Phonographic Industry for selling 60,000 units in the United Kingdom.

== Track listing ==
No.	Title	Artist(s)	Length
1.	"The Magic Piper (of Love)"	Edwyn Collins	03:50
2.	"BBC"	Ming Tea	02:06
3.	"Incense and Peppermints"	Strawberry Alarm Clock	02:48
4.	"Carnival"	The Cardigans	03:38
5.	"Mas Que Nada"	Sérgio Mendes & Brasil '66	02:40
6.	"Female Of The Species (Fembot Mix)"	Space	03:09
7.	"You Showed Me"	The Lightning Seeds	04:07
8.	"Soul Bossa Nova"	Quincy Jones and his Orchestra	02:45
9.	"These Days"	Luxury	03:12
10.	"Austin's Theme"	James Taylor Quartet	03:39
11.	"I Touch Myself"	Divinyls	03:47
12.	"Call Me"	The Mike Flowers Pops	02:52
13.	"The Look Of Love"	Susanna Hoffs	03:45
14.	"What The World Needs Now Is Love"	Burt Bacharach and The Posies	03:57
15.	"The Book Lovers"	Broadcast	03:33
16.	"Austin Powers"	Wondermints	02:46
17.	"The 'Shag-adelic' Austin Powers Score Medley"	George S. Clinton	04:49
Total length:			62:37

== Reception ==
Stephen Thomas Erlewine of AllMusic rated 3 out of 5, summarizing "the soundtrack balances '60s pop hits with '90s songs that wryly rework those swinging styles."

== Original score ==
The original score to the film composed by George S. Clinton was released on November 7, 2000, through RCA Victor records label. Tracks 1–7 represent the score composed for International Man of Mystery.

Christian Clemmensen of Filmtracks wrote "if you're looking for a more consistent vintage spy parody listening experience, Shearmur's Johnny English is easily superior, but Clinton certainly succeeded in harpooning the right targets for his Austin Powers assignments. The result is groovy, but tiresome."

No.	Title	Length
1.	"Cartage / Following / Virtucon"	02:09
2.	"Opening / Norad / Evacuation"	03:28
3.	"Vanessa's Theme"	02:08
4.	"Evil Plot / Steamroller / Mutant Sea Bass"	02:08
5.	"Danger March"	01:29
6.	"Hit & Run / Heroic Austin"	01:25
7.	"Probe / Fembots / Evil Orbit"	01:59
Total length:		14:46

== Charts ==
Weekly chart performance of Austin Powers: International Man of Mystery (Original Soundtrack)
Chart (1997–2020)	Peak position
New Zealand Albums (RMNZ)	30
UK Compilation Albums (OCC)	62
UK Soundtrack Albums (OCC)	5
US Billboard 200	184

== Certifications ==
Region	Certification	Certified units/sales
United Kingdom (BPI)	Silver	60,000^{*}
United States (RIAA)	Gold	500,000^{‡}
^{*} Sales figures based on certification alone.^{‡} Sales+streaming figures based on certification alone.
