= Vivo =

Vivo or VIVO may refer to:

== Companies ==
- Vivo (technology company), a Chinese consumer electronics company
- Vivo (telecommunications company), a Brazilian telecommunications company
- Vivo Class, a British company that sells a web-based rewards system to schools
- Vivo Defence Services, a British company formed by Serco and EQUANS who specialise in military infrastructure
- Vivo Energy, a British downstream petroleum company
- Vivo Film, an Italian film production company
- Vivo Software, an American streaming media company acquired by RealNetworks in 1998
- Vivo TV, a Brazilian pay television operator
- Vivo!, a retail-park brand of the Austrian real-estate company Immofinanz

== Computing ==
- VIVO (software), a suite for managing scientific research information
- Video-in video-out (VIVO), a type of graphics port

== Music ==
- Vivo (Coda album), 2006
- Vivo (Luis Miguel album), 2000
- Vivo (Ricardo Arjona album), 1999
- Vivo (Tanghetto album), 2011
- Vivo (Vico C album), 2001
- Vivo, an album by Clã, 2005
- "Vivo", a song by Andrea Bocelli from Sì, 2018
- "Vivo (Ti scrivo)", a song by Luca Barbarossa, representing Italy at the Eurovision Song Contest 1988

== Other uses ==
- Spanish brig Vivo, a ship of the Spanish Navy
- Vivo, Limpopo, a town in South Africa
- Vivo: The Life of Gustav Meyrink, a 2008 biography by Mike Mitchell
- Vivo (film), a 2021 American animated film
  - Vivo (soundtrack), the film's soundtrack
- Vivo (photography), a 1957–1961 Japanese photographic cooperative
- VIVO Media Arts Centre, an artist-run centre based in Vancouver, Canada

== See also ==
- En Vivo (disambiguation)
- Ex vivo, refers to studies or experiments done outside an organism
- In vivo, refers to studies or experiments done on living organisms
- Vevo
