= Buenos Aires Remixed =

Remix album by Tanghetto
- Released: October 10, 2005
- Genre: Electronica, progressive house, psychedelic trance, tango
- Label: Constitution Music
- Producer: Max Masri

Tanghetto chronology
Hybrid Tango (2004)	Buenos Aires Remixed (2005)	El Miedo a la Libertad (2008)

Buenos Aires Remixed is a remix album from the Argentine neotango band Tanghetto. The album includes 12 remixes of older songs from the band in a house/progressive mood. The album features covers of Depeche Mode's Enjoy the Silence and New Order's Blue Monday.

The remixes were made by members of the band themselves and guest DJs as well.

== Track listing and credits ==
1. Alexanderplatz Tango (Andina mix) [4:53] Performed by Tanghetto & ADN Proyecto Andino. Original version released on Emigrante (electrotango) album.
2. Incognito (Tanghetto mix) [4:44] Performed by B.A. Jam & Tanghetto. Remixed by Tanghetto. Original version released on Tangophobia Vol. 1 album.
3. Enjoy the Silence [5:23] Originally performed by Depeche Mode. Written by Martin Gore.
4. Vida Moderna en 2/4 (neo clubber mix) [5:58] Original version released on "Emigrante (electrotango)" album.
5. Blue Monday [4:29] Originally performed by New Order. Written by Stephen Morris, Peter Hook, Bernard Sumner & Gillian Gilbert
6. Aire (Tanghetto mix) [5:00] Performed by NeoShaft & Tanghetto. Remixed by Tanghetto. Original version released on "Tangophobia Vol. I" album.
7. Montevideo (Street Wise Religion radio edit) [4:36] Remixed by Diego Heavy. Original version released on "Emigrante (electrotango)" album.
8. Biorritmo (Disorder Mix) [04:24] Original version released on "Tangophobia Vol. I" album.
9. Recursos Humanos (Humana Mix) [5:20] Original version released on "Emigrante (electrotango)" album.
10. La Caída (Isabella mix) [4:21] Original version released on "Emigrante (electrotango)" album.
11. El Derrumbe (Insomnia Mix) [4:15] Original version released on "Tangophobia Vol. I" album.
12. Inmigrante (remix) [6:40] Original version released on "Emigrante (electrotango)" album.
13. La Muerte del Prejuicio (Aetherea mix) [6:23] Performed by Hybrid Tango / Tanghetto. Remixed by Tanghetto. Original version released on "Hybrid Tango" album.
14. Montevideo (Mechanica Mix) [4:25] Original version released on "Emigrante (electrotango)" album.

== Players in Blue Monday and Enjoy the Silence ==
- Max Masri: synths and programming
- Diego S. Velazquez: guitars
- Hugo Satorre: bandoneon
- Chao Xu: violoncello and erhu
- Matías Novelle: drums
- Darío Jalfin: piano
