= Tangophobia Vol. 1 =

2005 studio album by various artists

Tangophobia vol. 1

Studio album by Various artists
- Released: February 14, 2005
- Genre: Tango, Chill out music, electronica, pop
- Label: Constitution Music
- Producer: Max Masri, Diego S. Velázquez

Various artists chronology
Hybrid Tango (2004)	Tangophobia vol. 1 (2005)	Buenos Aires Remixed (2005)

Tangophobia Vol. 1: Contemporary Sounds of Buenos Aires is a compilation CD released by Argentine independent label Constitution Music. It contains tracks from different neo-tango and electronic artists from Buenos Aires, including NeoShaft, B.A. Jam, Hybrid Tango and Tanghetto.

The most important point of interest of this compilation are five unreleased tracks from the band Tanghetto, one of them being a remnant from "Emigrante (electrotango)" sessions, named "Otra oportunidad" ("Second chance").

In Tanghetto's words: "As we were still working on Emigrante (electrotango) and Hybrid Tango, we occasionally gathered together in the studio with friends and colleagues who are also exploring the path of tango and electronica. From these joint sessions arose this unusual compilation. We felt like this music was worth releasing as a full-length album".

The palette of styles goes from house to trip hop, from electrotango to chill out music.

The artists that performed in the album are Tanghetto, Hybrid Tango (Tanghetto's side project), NeoShaft, B.A. Jam and Black Market, all Buenos Aires–based electronic musicians.

== Track listing ==
1. "Humedad" (Humidity) [3:44] – Performed by Tanghetto
2. "La Huída" (The Runaway) [4:11] – Performed by Tanghetto and Black Market
3. "Incognito" [4:21] – Performed by B.A. Jam
4. "Aire" (Air) [5:22] – Performed by NeoShaft
5. "Renacer" (Rebirth) [5:04] – Performed by NeoShaft
6. "Tango Provocateur" [3:55] – Performed by B.A. Jam
7. "Diagonal Sur" [3:32] – Performed by Hybrid Tango / remixed by B.A. Jam
8. "Biorritmo" (Bio Rhythm) – Performed by Tanghetto and NeoShaft
9. "Sector 'A'" [3:30] – Performed by Hybrid Tango / remixed by B.A. Jam
10. "Sesión de Medianoche" (Midnight Session) [4:19] – Performed by B.A. Jam
11. "Otra Oportunidad" (Second Chance) – Performed by Tanghetto (Emigrante (electrotango) sessions)
12. "El Derrumbe" (The Downfall) [3:53] – Performed by Tanghetto
