= Más Allá del Sur =

Studio album by Tanghetto
- Released: November 21, 2009
- Genre: Tango, electronica, jazz
- Label: Constitution Music
- Producer: Max Masri

Tanghetto chronology
El Miedo a la Libertad (2008)	Más Allá del Sur (2009)	VIVO (2011)

Más Allá del Sur is Argentine electrotango band Tanghetto's third studio album (or fourth if Hybrid Tango, a side project released in 2004 is included). The album was released in November 2009.

According to the band's website, the album represents a move towards the roots of a more traditional tango, while keeping the modern elements that are a trademark of Tanghetto.

In 2010 the album received a Gardel Award nomination.

== Track list ==
1. Tango Místico (3:39)
2. La Milonga (3:28)
3. Leitmotif (4:11)
4. Blue Tango (3:49)
5. Biorritmo Porteño (4:11)
6. Abril (3:43)
7. Zita (de la "Suite Troileana", de Astor Piazzolla) (4:31)
8. La Zamba (4:36)
9. Dos Días en Buenos Aires (3:19)
10. Bahía Blanca (tango de Carlos Di Sarli) (3:14)
11. Fake Plastic Trees (Radiohead cover) (4:49)
12. Más allá del Sur (3:35)

All tracks composed by Masri and Velázquez except where indicated.

== Players ==
Max Masri: synthesizers and programming
Diego S. Velázquez: nylon string guitar, electric guitar, electric bass, piano
Antonio Boyadjian: acoustic and electric piano
Federico Vazquez: bandoneon
Chao Xu: violoncello and erhu
Daniel Corrado: electronic and acoustic Drums, percussion
Ricardo Josa: bombo legüero in "La Zamba" (guest musician)
Jorge Tibaud: double bass in "Tango Místico, "Abril" and "Bahía Blanca" (guest musician)

== Videoclips ==
1. Tango Místico (2010)
2. La Milonga (2010)
