= Don John =

Don John may refer to:

== People ==
- John of Austria (1547–1578), Habsburg admiral
- John Joseph of Austria (1629–1679), Habsburg general

== Other uses ==
- Don John (horse), a British Thoroughbred racehorse
- Don John, a character in Much Ado About Nothing
- Don John, an 1882 novel by Jean Ingelow
- Don John, a character in the animated series Adventure Time

== See also ==
- Don Jon, a 2013 film
- The Jester Don John of Austria, a 1633 portrait by Diego Velázquez
- Donjon (disambiguation)
- Donald John (disambiguation)
- Don Juan (disambiguation)
