= Hybrid Tango II =

Studio album by Tanghetto
- Released: May 14, 2014
- Genre: Tango; Electronica; Jazz; Fusion
- Label: Constitution Music
- Producer: Max Masri

Tanghetto chronology
Incidental Tango (2012)	Hybrid Tango II (2014)	Progressive Tango (2015)

Hybrid Tango II is Argentine electrotango band Tanghetto's sixth studio album. The album was released in May 2014.

Hybrid Tango II is the first studio album by Tanghetto featuring vocals ("No me rindo" and "Aires de Buenos Aires" are performed by Tabaré Leyton while Max Masri himself sings a cover version of "Vuelvo al Sur").

Hybrid Tango II is "an experiment in which Tanghetto tried to recreate -in the present day context- the influences brought by immigrants more than a hundred years ago, bringing an embryo of tango to life. In the musical 'conventillo' of today, the sounds are very different, and thus also the result."

In 2014, the album was nominated for a Latin Grammy Award.

== Track list ==
1. "Bohemian Tango" (3:23)
2. "Viveza Criolla" (4:39)
3. "El Miedo a la Libertad" (4:08)
4. "No me rindo" (3:49)
5. "Quejas de Bandoneón" (tango by Juan de Dios Filiberto) (2:48)
6. "Milonga del Chamuyo" (3:16)
7. "Quién me quita lo bailado" (3:35)
8. "Aires de Buenos Aires" (3:36)
9. "A Flor de Piel" (4:50)
10. "Milonguita Burlona" (3:14)
11. "Vuelvo al Sur" (Astor Piazzolla / Pino Solanas) (4:26)
12. "La Traición" (4:32)

All songs are composed by Masri and Velázquez except for Milonguita Burlona (by Masri), Quejas de Bandoneón and Vuelvo al Sur.

== Personnel ==
- Max Masri: synthesizers, programming and vocals in "Vuelvo al Sur"
- Diego S. Velázquez: nylon string guitar, electric guitar, electric bass, synths, piano, programming
- Antonio Boyadjian: acoustic and electric piano
- Leandro Ragusa: bandoneon
- Federico Vázquez: bandoneon
- Chao Xu: violoncello and erhu
- Daniel Corrado: electronic and acoustic drums, percussion
- Fernando Santodomingo: acoustic drums in "Vuelvo al Sur"
- Tabaré Leyton: vocals in "No me rindo" and "Aires de Buenos Aires"
- Aldo Di Paolo: acoustic piano in "El Miedo a la Libertad"

== Videoclips ==
Quién me quita lo bailado (2014)
