= Don Juan (disambiguation) =

Don Juan is a legendary fictional libertine.

Don Juan may also refer to:

== Persons ==
- John, Prince of Asturias (1478–1497), son of Queen Isabella I of Castile and King Ferdinand II of Aragon
- John, Prince of Girona (1509), son of King Ferdinand II of Aragon and Queen Germaine of Foix, died in infancy
- Don Juan Manuel (1282–1348), Castilian writer
- John of Austria (1547–1578), Don Juan de Austria, European admiral and general
- John Joseph of Austria (1629–1679), Don Juan de Austria the Younger, Prime Minister of Spain from 1677 to 1679
- Don "Magic" Juan (born 1950), American rapper
- Juan Carlos I (born 1938), king and head of state of Spain
- Infante Juan, Count of Barcelona (1913–1993), pretender

== Places ==
- Don Juan, Dominican Republic, a town
- Don Juan Pond, a lake in Antarctica

== Works inspired by Don Juan ==
=== Books ===
- El estudiante de Salamanca, a poem by José de Espronceda
- "Don Juan" (poem), a satiric narrative poem by Lord Byron
- Ibong Adarna, Philippine mythological story
- "Don Juan" (short story), a short story by E. T. A. Hoffmann
- Don Juan (novel), a 1963 novel by Gonzalo Torrente Ballester

=== Plays ===
- The Trickster of Seville and the Stone Guest, a c. 1630 play by Tirso de Molina
- Don Juan (Molière play), a 1665 play by Molière
- Don Juan Tenorio, an 1844 play by José Zorilla
- Don Juan (drama), a 1862 play by Aleksey Konstantinovich Tolstoy
- "Don Juan in Hell", Act III of George Bernard Shaw's 1905 work Man and Superman
- Don Juan (Brecht play), a 1954 adaptation of the Molière play by Bertolt Brecht

=== Films and TV ===
- Don Juan (1913 film), a Dutch silent film directed by Léon Boedels
- Don Juan (1922 film), a German silent film directed by Albert Heine and Robert Land
- Don Juan (1926 film), an American Vitaphone film starring John Barrymore
- The Private Life of Don Juan, a 1934 British film starring Douglas Fairbanks, Merle Oberon and Benita Hume
- Adventures of Don Juan, a 1948 American film starring Errol Flynn
- Don Juan (1950 film), a Spanish film starring Antonio Vilar. Annabella and María Rosa Salgado
- Don Juan (1955 film), an Austrian musical film directed by Walter Kolm-Veltée
- Don Juan (1956 film), a French-Italian-Spanish comedy film directed by John Berry
- Don Juan (1969 film), a Czechoslovak short film written and directed by Jan Švankmajer
- Don Juan, or If Don Juan Were a Woman, a 1973 French-Italian film with Brigitte Bardot
- Don Juan (1998 film), a film written and directed by Jacques Weber
- Don Juan DeMarco, a 1995 American film starring Johnny Depp
- The Don Juans, a 2013 Czech comedy film directed by Jiří Menzel

=== Music ===
- Don Juan (ballet), a ballet by Ranieri de' Calzabigi, Christoph Willibald Gluck and Gasparo Angiolini
- Don Juan (musical), a 2004 musical by Félix Gary
- Don Juan (Strauss), a 1888 tone poem by Richard Strauss
- Don Juan Triumphant, a fictional opera within Andrew Lloyd Webber's The Phantom of the Opera
- Réminiscences de Don Juan, an operatic fantasy by Franz Liszt
- "Don Juan" (Dave Dee, Dozy, Beaky, Mick & Tich song), 1969
- "Don Juan" (Fanny Lu song) a song by Fanny Lu from the album Felicidad y Perpetua
- "Don Juan" (Ernesto Ponzio song)
- "Don Juan", a song by Pet Shop Boys from the album Alternative
- The Don Juans (band), American folk music duo

== Other uses ==
- Don Juan (horse), an Australian racehorse
- Donjuan (magazine), a Colombian lads' mag
- Don Juan Matus, medicine man from Sonora, Mexico, featured in books by Carlos Castaneda
- Don Juan, another name for a pickup artist, after the character

== See also ==
- Don Juanism, non-clinical term for the desire, in a man, to have sex with many different female partners
- Don Jon, a 2013 film
- Don John (disambiguation), a similar name
