= El Miedo a la Libertad =

Studio album by Tanghetto
- Released: March 1, 2008
- Genre: Tango, electronica, jazz
- Label: Constitution Music
- Producer: Max Masri

Tanghetto chronology
Buenos Aires Remixed (2005)	El Miedo a la Libertad (2008)	Más Allá del Sur (2009)

El Miedo a la Libertad is the second studio by Buenos Aires–based electronic neo-tango band Tanghetto, or the third, considering that their side project Hybrid Tango (2004) is in fact part of their official discography, as well as part of their regular live repertoire. The album was released in March 2008.

The album is named after German psychologist Erich Fromm's famous book, Fear of Freedom. It's an instrumental record, and to the usual combination of tango and electronica, elements from jazz and more acoustic sounds are added to the blend.

The music of El Miedo a la Libertad balances electronically generated sounds and acoustic instruments like bandoneón, piano, violin, erhu, acoustic drums and guitar. The album was produced by Max Masri and coproduced by Diego S. Velázquez.

Like its predecessor, Buenos Aires Remixed, this album also features a selection of cover versions of music pieces from diverse styles performed in the unique style of the band. The covers included in this release are Eurythmics' Sweet Dreams (Are Made of This), Sting's Englishman in New York and Herbie Hancock's 1964 jazz standard Cantaloupe Island.

In 2009 the album achieved a Gardel Award.

== Track listing ==
1. El Testigo (5:04)
2. Buscando Camorra (4:22)
3. Sweet Dreams (Are Made of This) (3:56)
4. El Arte de Amar (4:09)
5. Viajero Inmóvil (3:05)
6. Englishman in New York (A bandoneonist in New York) (3:38)
7. ¿Alguien se acuerda del Mayo Francés? (3:53)
8. Media Persona (3:52)
9. Cantaloupe Island (4:14)
10. La Deuda Interna (4:58)
11. El Desvío (4:01)
12. El Miedo a la Libertad (4:59)

All songs are composed by Masri and Velázquez, except for Englishman in New York and Cantaloupe Island.

== Personnel ==
- Max Masri: synthesizers and programming
- Diego S. Velázquez: nylon-string guitar, metallophone
- Chao Xu: violoncello and erhu
- Federico Vazquez: bandoneon
- Antonio Boyadjian: acoustic and electric piano
- Daniel Corrado: acoustic/electronic drums and percussion
- Esteban Morgado: nylon-string guitar (guest musician)
- Quique Condomí: violin (guest musician)
