= Incidental Tango =

Studio album by Tanghetto
- Released: December 4, 2012
- Genre: Tango, electronica, incidental music, chamber music, fusion
- Label: Constitution Music
- Producer: Max Masri

Tanghetto chronology
VIVO Milonguero (2012)	Incidental Tango (2012)	Hybrid Tango II (2014)

Incidental Tango is Argentine electrotango band Tanghetto's fifth studio album. The album was released in December 2012.

Comprising 20 tracks, this is the longest studio album to date release by the band. It features a more "cinematic" sound, hence the name "incidental tango" in reference to "incidental" or film music.

One prominent feature of the album is the reworking of several songs with new arrangements by Aldo Di Paolo with Max Masri and Antonio Boyadjian included in previous albums ("Inmigrante", "Emigrante", "Una Llamada", "Biorritmo", "Tangocrisis", "El Testigo", and "Al final todos se van"), adapted to diverse variants of chamber ensemble (piano trio, piano solo, etc.)

According to the band, Incidental Tango is "a suggestive music from Buenos Aires that is full of images. Cinematic impressions. An 'Incidental Tango'. The album is composed of newly recorded material, including avant-garde versions of Tanghetto classics arranged for string quartet, piano and bandoneon with the contribution of Aldo Di Paolo, and new songs that cover different emotions from nostalgia to urban frenzy."

In 2013 the album was nominated for a Gardel Award.

== Track list ==
1. Yumbera (4:12)
2. Inmigrante (4:19)
3. Renacer (5:01)
4. Una Llamada (4:12)
5. Incidental Payada (3:15)
6. Milonguita Antipatica (2:01)
7. Disorder Tango (3:58)
8. Malambo De La Furia (3:47)
9. Biorritmo (4:01)
10. Incidental Tango (3:09)
11. Antonia (feat. Aldo Di Paolo) (4:10)
12. Incidental Milonga (3:55)
13. Un Tango Para Dos Evas (4:29)
14. Incidental Candombe (3:28)
15. Tangocrisis II (4:27)
16. Milonga Moderna (3:18)
17. El Testigo (4:09)
18. Amanece En Buenos Aires (3:39)
19. Emigrante (Exilio Del Alma) (4:18)
20. Al Final Todos Se Van (4:50)

== Personnel ==
- Max Masri: synthesizers, programming.
- Diego S. Velázquez: nylon string guitar, electric guitar, electric bass, synths, piano, programming
- Aldo Di Paolo: acoustic piano
- Antonio Boyadjian: acoustic and electric piano
- Federico Vázquez: bandoneon
- Leandro Ragusa: bandoneon
- Chao Xu: violoncello and erhu
- Daniel Corrado: electronic and acoustic drums, percussion
- Antonia Chillà: violoncello
- Andreina Kiss: violin
- Ricardo Josa: bombo legüero, percussion
