= Vivos =

Vivos may refer to:

- Vivos (album)
- Vivos (film), a 2020 German-Mexican documentary film
- Vivos (underground shelter)
- Vivo Class, a school reward system

== See also ==
- Inter vivos
