= En Vivo =

En Vivo may refer to:

== Music ==
- En Vivo (Ana Gabriel album), 1990
- En vivo (Ha*Ash album), 2019
- En Vivo! (Iron Maiden album), 2012
- En Vivo (Kany García album), 2014
- En Vivo (Malpaís album), 2006
- En Vivo (Marco Antonio Solís album), 2000
- En Vivo, Vol. 2 (Marco Antonio Solís album), 2001
- En Vivo (Mijares album), 2001
- En Vivo (Selección Nacional de Tango album), 2007
- En vivo (Serú Girán album), 1993
- En Vivo! (The Nadas album)

== Broadcasting ==
- En Vivo (programadora), a Colombian programadora that operated between 1995 and 2001

== See also ==
- Vivo (disambiguation)
