= Donald John =

Donald John is a first and middle name and may refer to:

== Politicians ==
- Donald John Trump (born 1946), 45th president of the United States
- Donald John Trump Jr. (born 1977), son of Donald Trump
- Donald John Bacon (born 1963), United States representative
- Donald John Lee (1927–2011), former United States district judge
- Donald John Bowman (1936–2013), Australian politician
- Huan Donald John Fraser (1940–2010), Australian politician

== Scientists ==
- Donald John Markwell (born 1959), Australian social scientist
- Donald John McGillivray (1935–2012), Australian botanical taxonomist
- Donald John Wiseman (1918–2010), British archaeologist
- Donald John Logan Bennet (born 1957), British archaeologist
- Donald John Pinkava (1933–2017), American botanist
- Donald John Lewis (1926–2015), American mathematician

== Sportsmen ==
- Donald John May (born 1946), American basketball player
- Donald John Allan (born 1949), Australian cyclist
- Donald John Deacon (1912–1943), Canadian ice hockey player
- Donald John Bacon (born 1935), American MiLB player

== Businessmen ==
- Donald John Tyson (1930–2011), American businessman and CEO of Tyson Foods
- Donald John Roberts (born 1945), Canadian-American economist

== Military personnel ==
- Donald John Dean (1897–1985), English recipient of the Victoria Cross
- Donald John Stott (1914–1945), New Zealand soldier

== Other ==
- Donald John Cameron (1993–2016), New Zealand journalist
- Donald John Smith (1926–2014), English priest

== See also ==
- Don John (disambiguation)
- John Donald (disambiguation)
