= Enciéndelo =

Studio album by Coda
- Released: August 14, 1993
- Genre: Rock en Español; Hard rock
- Length: 48:44
- Label: Sony Music International
- Producer: Luis Carlos Maluly and Coda

Coda chronology
Tiempo Perfecto (1990)	Enciéndelo (1993)	Veinte Para Las Doce (1995)

Enciéndelo is the first full-length album released by Mexican rock band, Coda. It was released in 1993.

== Track listing ==
1. "Atrevete" - 3:45
2. "Caminando En El Fuego" - 3:50
3. "Sin Tí No Se Continuar" - 3:54
4. "Viviendo De Noche" - 3:28
5. "Atado a Tu Piel" - 3:27
6. "Vivo o Muerto" - 3:45
7. "Boby" - 4:07
8. "Eternamente" - 4:57
9. "Preso De La Inquietud" - 4:19
10. "Tócame" - 3:57
11. "Pamela" - 3:52
12. "Hielo En Las Rosas" - 5:23

== Personnel ==
- Salvador Aguilar - lead vocals
- Toño Ruiz - guitars
- Chucho Esquivel - drums
- Allan Pérez - bass
- David Melchor - keyboards
