= Vivo (Tanghetto album) =

Live album by Tanghetto
- Released: 2011
- Recorded: 2007–2010
- Genre: Electrotango, Argentine tango, electronica, jazz fusion, electropop
- Label: Constitution Music
- Producer: Max Masri

Tanghetto chronology
| Más Allá del Sur (2009) | Vivo (2011) | VIVO Milonguero (2012) |

Vivo is the first of two studio albums released by Argentine electrotango band Tanghetto. It was recorded during the El Miedo a la Libertad and Más Allá del Sur tours from 2007 through 2010, in different cities in South America, North America and Europe.

During the 2007 European tour, Tanghetto was interviewed and performed in the BBC World Service. This performance was recorded and later included in VIVO, amongst other recordings in different cities, such as Buenos Aires, São Paulo, Mexico City, Montevideo, Groningen and Paris.

The album included three studio bonus tracks: "Juego Irreal", an original Tanghetto song performed by Uruguayan tango singer Tabaré Leyton, a cover of Seven Nation Army from The White Stripes and a cover of Computer Love from Kraftwerk.

A second volume with more tango dance-friendly and generally a more acoustic and organic sound was released in 2012 under the name VIVO Milonguero.

VIVO was nominated for a Gardel Award in Argentina in 2011.

== Track listing ==
1. "Más de lo Mismo" (4:36) - live in Milan, Italy
2. "El Boulevard" (4.11) - live in Buenos Aires, Argentina
3. "An Englishman in New York" - live in São Paulo, Brazil
4. "Inmigrante" (4:16) - live in São Paulo, Brazil
5. "Buscando Camorra" - live in Mexico City
6. "La Milonga" (3:24) - live in Milan, Italy
7. "Una Llamada" (4:24) - live in Los Angeles, USA
8. "Tango Místico" (3.58) - live in Milan, Italy
9. "Recursos Humanos" (4:19) - live in Montevideo, Uruguay
10. "Enjoy the Silence" (5:21) - live in London, United Kingdom
11. "Alexanderplatz Tango" (4.18) -live in Groningen, Netherlands
12. "El Deseo" (3:53) - live in Paris, France
13. "Al final todos se van" (4:22) - live in Milan, Italy
14. "Vida Moderna en 2/4" (4:15) - live in Buenos Aires, Argentina

Bonus tracks (studio)

15. "Milonga Moderna (Remix)" 4:00
16. "Seven Nation Army" (White Stripes) 3:45
17. "Computer Love" (Kraftwerk) 3:29< /li>
