= Tiempo Perfecto =

EP by Coda
- Released: 1990
- Genre: Rock en Español
- Length: 31:08
- Label: Discos Gas

Coda chronology
Tiempo Perfecto (1990)	Enciéndelo (1993)

Tiempo Perfecto is the first album released by Mexican rock band, Coda. It was released in 1990.

== Track listing ==
1. "Intro" - 0:30
2. "Girara (Hasta Caer)" - 3:36
3. "Suelto El Deseo" - 3:43
4. "Sin Dinero" - 3:20
5. "Tiempo Perfecto" - 3:44
6. "Espía" - 4:23
7. "Por Que te Fuiste" - 5:14
8. "Con O Sin Tí" - 5:18
9. "Como Un Tiro" - 1:20

== Personnel ==
- Salvador Aguilar - lead vocals
- Toño Ruiz - guitars
- Chucho Esquivel - drums
- Zitto Bremont - bass
- Diego Benyure - keyboards
