= Veinte Para Las Doce =

Studio album by Coda
- Released: June 27, 1995
- Recorded: February, 1995 at Jacob's Studios, Farnham, England
- Genre: Rock en Español; Hard rock
- Length: 47:49
- Label: Sony Music International
- Producer: Robin Black

Coda chronology
Enciéndelo (1993)	Veinte Para Las Doce (1995)	Nivel 3 (1997)

Veinte Para Las Doce is the second album released by Mexican rock band, Coda. It was recorded on Jacob's Studios at Farnham, England and released in 1995. The album was produced by Robin Black who had previously worked with Pink Floyd, Black Sabbath, Bee Gees, and Supertramp. The arrangements were done by Spike Edney, keyboardist of Queen. The power ballad "Aún" includes a string arrangement by Edney.

== Track listing ==
1. "Pon El Mundo A Girar" - 4:04
2. "Si Te Tuviera Aquí" - 4:55
3. "Dame Un Poco De Tiempo" - 4:22
4. "Aún" - 4:53
5. "Otro Tono Al Gris" - 4:25
6. "Veinte Para Las Doce" - 5:01
7. "Frío" - 4:23
8. "Solo" - 4:38
9. "No Puedo Estar Sin Tí" - 3:43
10. "Sed" - 3:23
11. "Nada En Común" - 4:02

== Personnel ==
- Salvador Aguilar - lead vocals
- Toño Ruiz - guitars
- Chucho Esquivel - drums
- Allan Pérez - bass
- David Melchor - keyboards
