= Sverre Indris Joner =

Norwegian musician

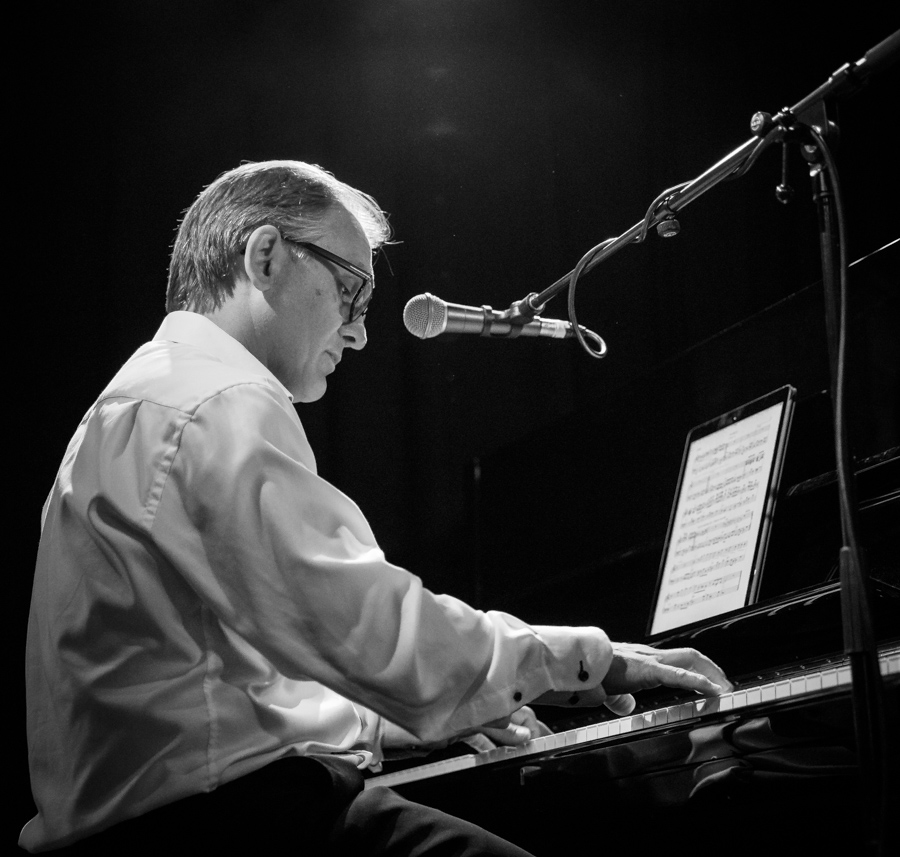
Sverre Indris Joner

Sverre Indris Joner (born 19 July 1963) is a Norwegian musician, composer, and arranger. He frequently performs on piano and percussion.

Joner was born in Oslo and was raised in Bergen. He is a graduate of the University of Oslo and the Cervantes Conservatory in Havana, Cuba. Additionally, he is the father of singer Alexandra Joner, and uncle of actor Kristoffer Joner.

He is particularly known for popularizing Latin American music in Norway. He has composed music in such styles and has also adapted and arranged many popular European classical music pieces, such as Wolfgang Amadeus Mozart's "Eine kleine Nachtmusik", Ludwig van Beethoven's Fifth Symphony, and Johann Strauss II's "The Blue Danube". Joner's adaptations often employ elements of salsa music such as son. He often performs these as part of the music groups Hovedøen Social Club and La Descarga. Other groups in which he performs and has founded include Salzumba and Electrocutango.

Joner has performed with many symphony orchestras, including those from Norway and Germany (Bremen, Dresden, and Berlin) as well as the BBC Symphony Orchestra. He has composed and arranged music for the stage and screen.
