= Nivel 3 =

Studio album by Coda
- Released: 1997
- Genre: Rock en Español; Hard rock
- Length: 46:44
- Label: Sony Music International
- Producer: Alejandro Zepeda and Coda

Coda chronology
Veinte Para Las Doce (1995)	Nivel 3 (1997)	Vivo (2006)

Nivel 3 is the third album released by Mexican rock band, Coda. It was released in 1997.

== Track listing ==
1. "No Digas No" - 3:20
2. "Luz Roja" - 3:42
3. "Por Tí" - 3:47
4. "Prohibido" - 4:09
5. "En La Marea Del Pecado" - 4:18
6. "Perdóname" - 4:23
7. "Carrusel" - 3:34
8. "Muy Bien" - 4:10
9. "No Te Quiero Perder" - 5:00
10. "Halcón De Invierno" - 4:54
11. "¿Que Color Se Necesita?" - 5:27

== Personnel ==
- Salvador Aguilar - lead vocals
- Toño Ruiz - guitars
- Chucho Esquivel - drums
- Allan Pérez - bass
- David Melchor - keyboards
