= Coda (Mexican band) =

Mexican rock band

- Origin: CDMX, Mexico
- Genres: Hard rock, heavy metal
- Years active: 1989–2000, 2002–present
- Label: Sony Music
- Website: Official Site

Coda is a band from Mexico, formed in 1989. The band had much of success in the early 1990s, releasing four albums. In the late 1990s, the band had several line-up changes; the band disbanded in 2000, but resurfaced in 2002 with a new line-up.

== Band history ==
=== Early years (1989−1990) ===
Coda was formed in 1989 by Salvador "Chava" Aguilar and Toño Ruíz with the intention to do quality rock music. They recruited Jesús "Chucho" Esquivel, Zitto Bremont and Diego Benyure. Their first show was in April 1989 when they opened a concert for another band at the Isabel Corona Theater in Mexico. In 1990, they released an EP called Tiempo Perfecto that was poorly received. Shortly after, Diego and Zitto left the band and were replaced with David Melchor and Allán Pérez respectively.

=== Rise to fame (1991–1994) ===
In December 1991, Raúl Vázquez, general director of Sony Music, heard the band and decided to sign them. The following year, they started working on their first full-length album. Enciéndelo was finally released in 1993 produced by Luis Carlos Maluly. The album managed to put the band on the radar and featured singles like "Tócame", "Eternamente", and "Sin Ti No Se Continuar". The video of "Tócame", directed by Memo del Bosque peaked at #1 in the TV channel TeleHit.

Following the success of the album, they opened concerts in Mexico for bands like Def Leppard and Mötley Crüe, and toured intensively through their country, playing for the first time at the Palacio de los Deportes of Mexico. They also won Best Hard Rock Band at the VIII National Survey Awards.

=== Success with second album (1995–1998) ===
In February 1995, the band moved to Farnham, England to record their next album at Jacob's Studios. Veinte Para Las Doce was produced by Robin Black (Pink Floyd, Black Sabbath, Bee Gees and Supertramp) and arranged by Spike Edney, (a recurrent Keyboardist from the 1986 Magic Tour by Queen). It was released in 1995 and the power ballad "Aún" reached the top of the Mexican charts and became one of the biggest classic songs from the mid 90s in Ibero-America. The song ranked 68 on the VH1 list Las 100 + grandiosas canciones de los 90´s en español. The song included a string arrangement by Edney. Also, the video of the title song peaked at #1 at TeleHit.

To support the album, they toured through Honduras, Guatemala, El Salvador, Costa Rica, and the United States. They also played at the IX Festival Nuestro Rock with Caifanes, El Tri, and La Ley. From 1995 to 1996 they played at the Plaza de Toros México, Estadio Centenario at Cuernavaca, and the Metropolitan Theater of Mexico.

After extensive touring, the band went to the studio again and recorded their next album titled Nivel 3. The album was released in 1997 and produced by Alejandro Zepeda and the band. It featured the singles "Luz Roja" and "No Digas No". In November, they opened a concert for Scorpions at the Palacio de los Deportes of Mexico. They also joined the Universo Musical 1997 tour that started in Chihuahua and finished in Cancún visiting 91 cities. In 1998, they also won the Best Hard Rock Band Award from the Nuestro Rock Awards.

=== Transition and retirement (1998–2000) ===
In 1998, lead singer Chava Aguilar left the band citing personal reasons. He was replaced by Eduardo Contreras (formerly of Tercer Acto). With Contreras in front, they continued to tour. The following year, they were nominated again for the Best Hard Rock Band Award of the Nuestro Rock Awards.

During this period of transition, the band allegedly wrote 30 songs. They decided to sign with Polygram, but at that time, the label merged with Universal Records. This ultimately left the band in the air, which prompted Pérez and Esquivel to leave the band. They were replaced by Fito Cedillo and Andrés Mura.

In 2000, band co-founder, Toño Ruíz decided to retire the band and to produce other artists. The rest of the band members also started other musical ventures.

=== Band reunion (2002–) ===
In September 2002, former singer and co-founder, Chava Aguilar, decided to start the band again after receiving e-mails from fans asking him to do so. He initially planned to go solo, but eventually decided to recruit Nicolas Loizaga (Guitar), Adrian Rojas (Bass), Luis Dominguez (Keyboards), who had previously played in Brujha, and Charly Salazar (Drums). Aguilar had met them in the old Coda days. The band became Retto. In that period the band co-wrote/produced over 20 songs and recorded them together with Gazú (LAML), Sergio Santacruz (Neón), and Joan Romagosa (Los Necios). During that period Retto started preparing for a tour. After 2 years of moving round in circles and due to differences with Aguilar and Manager Lilian de Leon, Loizaga, Rojas and Dominguez left the band. He recruited an entire new line-up with Enrique Cuevas (guitars), Cesar "Gusano" (bass), Adan Ramos (drums), and Adrian Keys (keyboards). In June 2004, the band started recording material for their next album. Vivo was finally released July 6, 2006.

Salvador Aguilar died from stomach cancer on 21 August 2025, at the age of 56.

== Discography ==
- Tiempo Perfecto (EP/Demo - 1990)
- Enciéndelo (1993)
- Veinte Para Las Doce (1995)
- Nivel 3 (1997)
- Chava AH Interludio (2004) + 1 inedit Coda track
- Vivo (2006)
- Cabo (2008)
- Coda: Drago Hits 2002-2009 (2009)
- Eternamente Coda, Tributo (2009).
- La Historia (2010)
- Xava Drago - Rapsodia Apocaliptica (2011).
- Coda 9 (2012)
- Xava Drago - Rock Classics (2013).
- Xava Drago - EP (2014).
- Coda - Ciclos (2015).

== Band members ==
=== Current members ===
- Enrique Cuevas - guitars (2002–present)
- Cesar "Gusano" - bass (2002–present)
- Adan Ramos - drums (2002–present)
- Adrian Keys - keyboards (2002–present)

=== Former members ===
- Salvador Aguilar - lead vocals (1989–1998, 2002–2025; his death)
- Chucho Esquivel - drums (1989–1995)
- Toño Ruíz - guitar (1989–2000)
- Zito Martínez - bass guitar (1989–1991)
- Diego Benyure - keyboards (1989–1990)
- David Melchor - keyboards (1990–2000)
- Allan Pérez - bass guitar (1991–1999)
- Eduardo Contreras - lead vocals (1998–2000)
- Eloy Polito Sanchez - drums (1995–1999)
- Andrés Mura - drums (1999–2000)
- Nicolás Loizaga- guitar (2000–2002)
- Adrian Rojas- bass guitar (2000–2002)
- Luis Dominguez- Keyboards (2000–2001)
- Elias Ferrari (guitar) (2008-2009)
