= Casimiro Aín =

Argentine tango promoter (1882–1940)

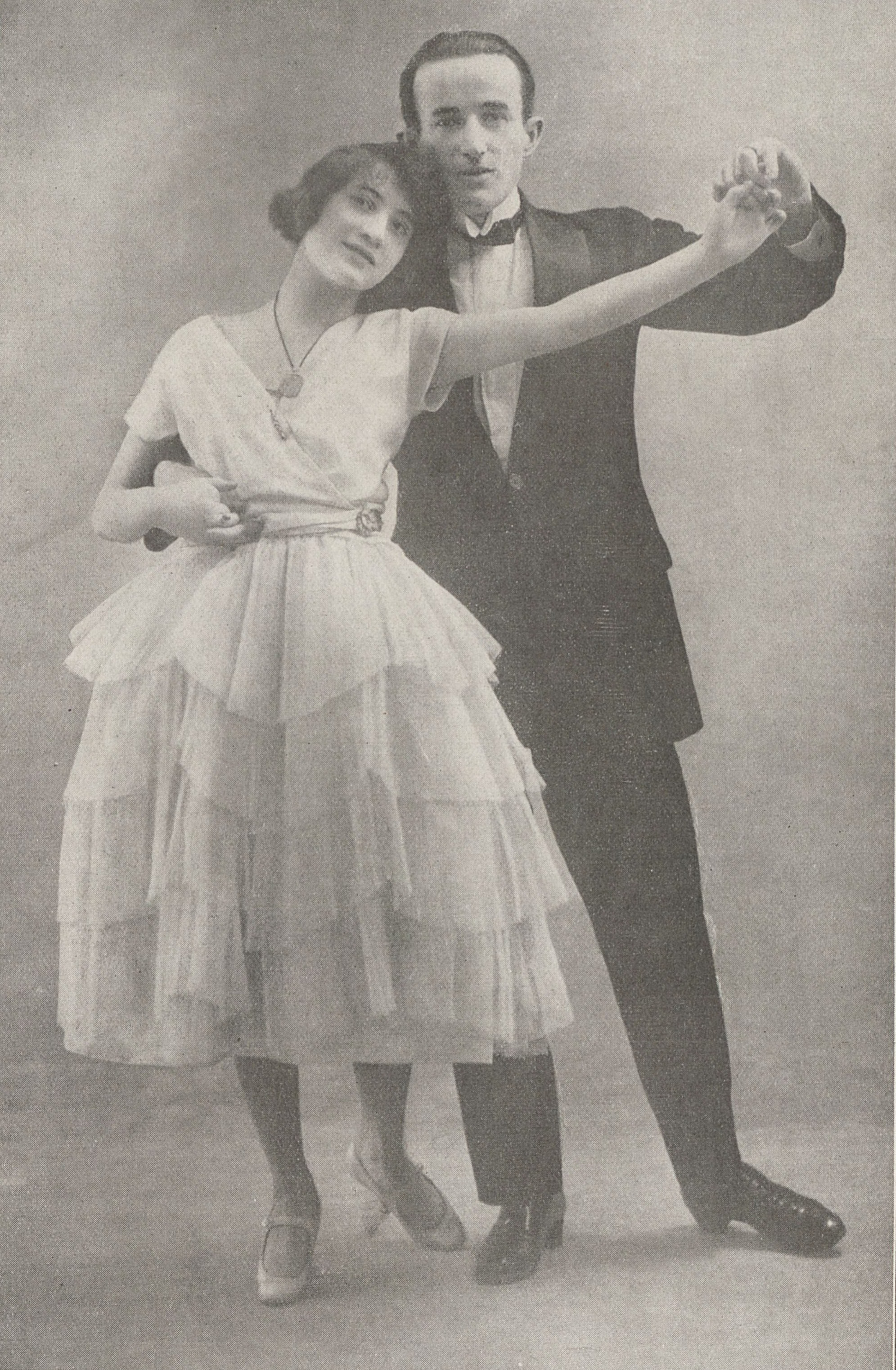
- Casimiro Aín with unidentified partner
- Born: Casimiro Agustín Aín; 4 March 1882; Buenos Aires, Argentina
- Died: 17 October 1940 (aged 58); Buenos Aires, Argentina
- Other names: El Vasco, El Lecherito
- Occupations: Tango dancer, promoter
- Years active: 1896–1939

Casimiro Agustín Aín (4 March 1882 – 17 October 1940), nicknamed “El Vasco” (“The Basque”) or “El Lecherito” (“The Little Milkman”), was an Argentinian dancer and promoter of Argentine tango. He is recognized as one of the first performers to spread and establish this Buenos Aires dance in Europe and the United States, as well as for achieving the official acceptance of tango before Pope Pius XI at the Vatican.

== Life ==
Casimiro Aín was born on March 4, 1882 in Buenos Aires. He was the first son of Juan Aín (a well-known milkman nicknamed “El Vasco”) and the Genoese Rosa Rataro.

During his childhood, he accompanied his father on milk delivery rounds, which earned him the nickname "El Lecherito" ("The Little Milkman"). From a very young age, he showed an interest in the music of street barrel organs and began dancing corridos, pasodobles, and especially the emerging tango criollo.

At the age of fourteen, he joined the circus troupe of the clown Frank Brown, touring various venues in the interior of the country. There, he perfected his dance technique and learned the "corte y quebrada" moves characteristic of early tango.

In 1901, feeling that Buenos Aires had become "too small" for him, he travelled to Europe, arriving first in England, then in Paris, and later in Spain, where, accompanied by two musicians, he introduced tango criollo in bars and cabarets to audiences unfamiliar with the dance.

In 1904, he returned to Buenos Aires and, encouraged by the reception he had received in the Old World, performed at the Teatro Ópera alongside his wife Marta. He also took part in the celebrations commemorating the Centennial of the May Revolution. During these years, he continued to refine his style with the goal of once again presenting himself as a tango ambassador in Europe.

== International career ==
In 1913, Aín and his wife boarded the steamship Sierra Ventana bound for Europe, arriving first in Boulogne-sur-Mer (France) and then in Paris. There, they settled in Montmartre, where they performed at the cabaret Princesse (later known as "El Garrón"), generating great excitement over the novelty of tango criollo as performed by "El Vasco." Traveling with them was a traditional tango orchestra composed of Vicente Loduca (bandoneon), Eduardo Monelos (violin), and Celestino Ferrer (piano).

Between 1913 and 1916, Aín also performed in New York, presenting his show in various dance halls. After that period, he returned to Buenos Aires to teach tango classes at academies and instruct ladies of the Buenos Aires high society.

In 1920, Aín returned to Paris and won the World Championship of Modern Dances alongside his new partner Jazmín, earning the nickname "The King of Tango" in the French capital. During the 1920s, he traveled through France, Germany, Denmark, England, Switzerland, Portugal, Spain, Italy, Hungary, Romania, Poland, Russia, Greece, and Turkey, as well as Brazil and Egypt, accompanied by musicians and dancers (including Edith Peggy, Simonette Guy, and "La Beba"). On each tour, he performed in cabarets, brothels, and elegant salons, contributing to the international spread of tango.

=== Audience with Pope Pius XI ===
On February 1, 1924, Aín was invited to the Vatican through the mediation of the Argentine ambassador García Mansilla. In the Throne Room, he danced the tango "Ave María" by Francisco and Juan Canaro alongside María Scotto (librarian and translator at the embassy) before Pope Pius XI. The performance, accompanied by a harmonium, ended with an improvised move in which the couple knelt before the Pontiff. With this act, Aín managed to demonstrate that tango was neither a licentious dance nor contrary to Catholic morality, despite criticisms from Parisian prelates who considered the dance obscene.

== Last years ==
Upon his definitive return to Argentina in 1930, Aín continued performing for a few years, this time accompanied by "La Vasca," who was born in the Buenos Aires neighborhood of Monserrat. At the end of the 1930s, he underwent the amputation of a leg due to gangrene, which marked the decline of his career. Casimiro Aín died on October 17, 1940, in Buenos Aires.
