= Donjon (disambiguation) =

A donjon or keep is a defensive tower.

Donjon may also refer to:

- Donjon (role-playing game)
- Donjon (comics) or Dungeon, a series of comics
- Johannès Donjon, a French composer for the flute

== See also ==
- Don Jon, a 2013 romantic comedy film
