= Don Juan (Ernesto Ponzio song) =

Song
- Language: Spanish
- Published: 1898
- Recorded: 1910
- Genre: Tango
- Length: c.3:00
- Composer(s): Ernesto Ponzio
- Lyricist(s): Ricardo Podestá

Don Juan – or Don Juan (el taita del barrio) – is an Argentine tango, whose music was composed (at least in his greater part) by Ernesto Ponzio, and lyrics written afterwards by Ricardo Podestá. Jorge Luis Borges referred to his friend Ponzio's composition as "one of the earliest and best tangos".

It was composed in 1898 or later, and the oldest known recording comes from 1910. It was registered with SADAIC in 1941 (the Society had been founded less than a decade before).

== Lyrics ==
The tango begins ""En el tango soy tan taura / que cuando hago un doble corte / corre la voz por el Norte / si es que me encuentro en el Sur" Borges commented on these lyrics as bravado. Borges's translator (Weinberger 1999) translated these lyrics in his translation of Borges as "When I tango I'm so tough / that, when I whirl a double cut / word reaches the Northside / if I'm dancing in the South..".

== History ==
There are several versions on the origin of the song, as well as of his title; almost all coincide in that it was composed in Mamita, and is usually agreed that it was during the year 1898.
