= Neotango =

Genre of tango

Neotango is a distinct genre of tango which goes beyond it both in music and in dance. It is a global movement in which the music includes tracks from all over the world, instrumental and vocal, distinct from the tango in that it includes only modern music recorded in the last 30-40 years, and can be danced using the tango's biomechanics. As a dance form it is still evolving. It is a 'living' globalized tango dance form of the 21st century.

== The music ==
The term neotango has been used in the past as a synonym for tango nuevo, for example when Astor Piazzolla broke some rules of the musical tango pattern. Nowadays it mainly refers to electrotango, a fusion of tango and electronic music which emerged in Argentina in the early 2000s (Gotan Project, Tanghetto, Bajofondo, Electrocutango, Tango Jointz, Tango Fusion, Narcotango and Otros Aires) .

Neotango is also used to classify milongas where a wide spectrum of music is played: not only electrotango and tango nuevo, but also classical music, blues, trip-hop, ballads, dubstep, deep house, klezmer, soundtracks, chillout, world music, etc.

== The dance ==
Neotango dance is not tango nuevo. The term "tango nuevo" has been used in dance every time an Argentinian tango teacher came out saying he was teaching a new dancing style. For example, the term was used to refer to the tango of the old "Petroleo" around 1940, as well as around 1990-2000 when some Argentinian teachers promoted out-of-axis dynamics in their seminars around the world.

Neotango uses standard tango biomechanics and the tango's flow on the dance floor. It is open to fusion dances and technologies, and it does not follow any of the strict rules of a traditional milonga.
