= Malpaís (group) =

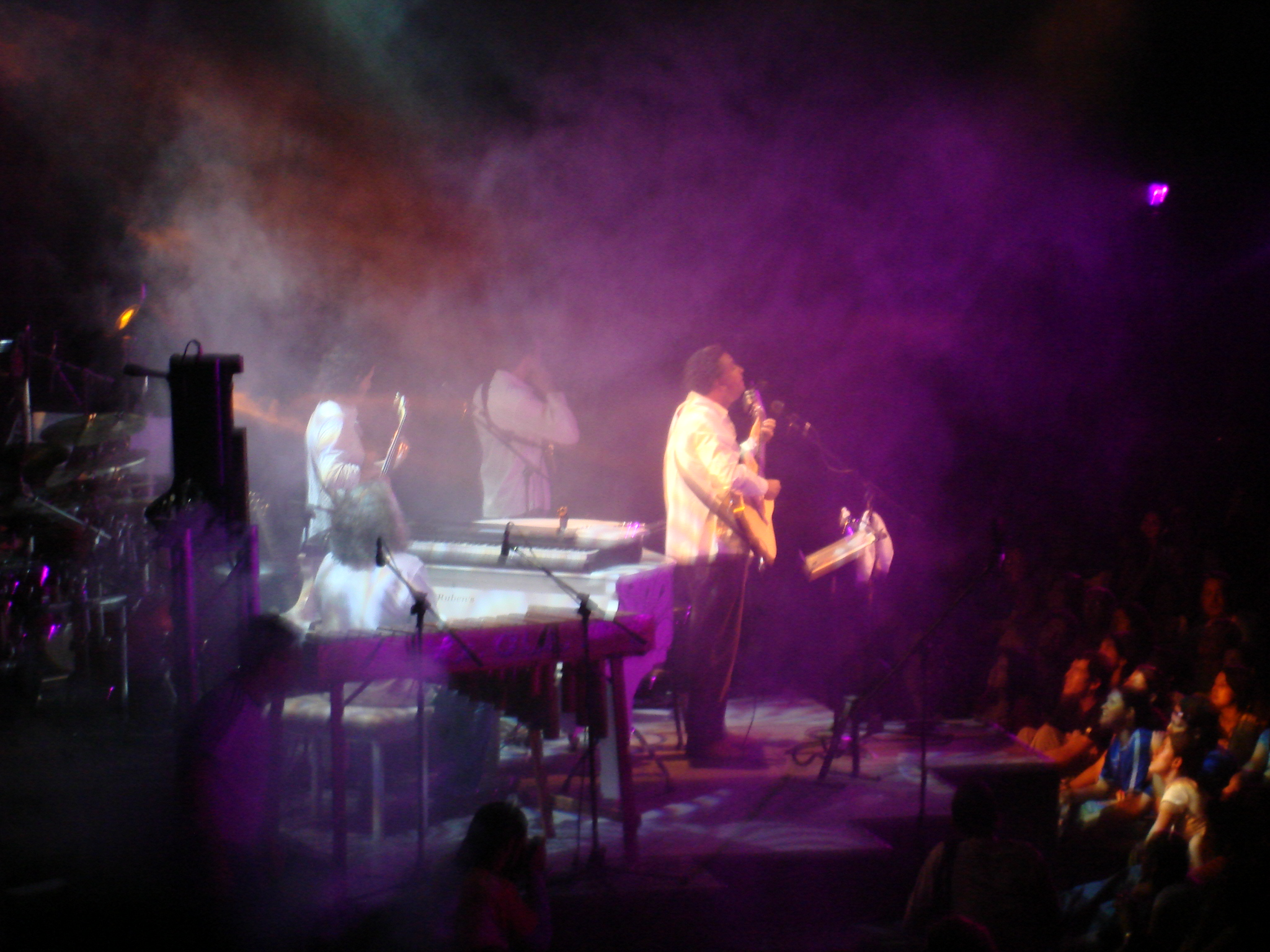

Background information
- Origin: San José, Costa Rica
- Genres: World music
- Years active: 1999–present
- Labels: Papaya
- Members: Jaime Gamboa; Iván Rodríguez; Carlos "Tapado" Vargas; Manuel Obregón; Gilberto Jarquín; Daniela Rodríguez; David Coto
- Past members: Fidel Gamboa; Patricio "Pato" Barraza; Bernardo Quesada
- Website: www.grupomalpais.com

Malpaís is a band from Costa Rica. The music of Malpaís is part of the Costa Rica-contemporary compositions work, called by the band "Costarican new song". The musicians are trying to relate the concept to the early folk and protest folk tradition of Latin America, mixing musical structures of regional and local folk genres such as calypso and tambito with easy-listening jazz (breaks and progressions) and romantic lyrics inspired in Latin American songwriters in order to be perceived as if they are built on the solid tradition of their musical roots. The group takes its name from the most remote, jungle-cradled beach on the north-Pacific Nicoya Peninsula—the beach at road’s end.

Although the band has decreased its musical output, it continues to perform live shows and musicals.

== Members ==
=== Current members ===
- Jaime Gamboa — Bass, backing vocalist (founder)
- Iván Rodríguez — Violin, mandolin, lead vocalist (founder)
- Carlos "Tapao" Vargas — Drums, percussion (founder)
- Manuel Obregón — Keyboard, piano, accordion, marimba (since 2000)
- Gilberto Jarquín — Drums (since 2003)
- Daniela Rodríguez — Lead vocalist (since 2007)
- David Coto — Guitar (since 2013)

=== Former members ===
- Patricio "Pato" Barraza (1999-2000)
- Bernardo Quesada (1999-2000)
- Fidel Gamboa (Founder; deceased 28 August 2011)

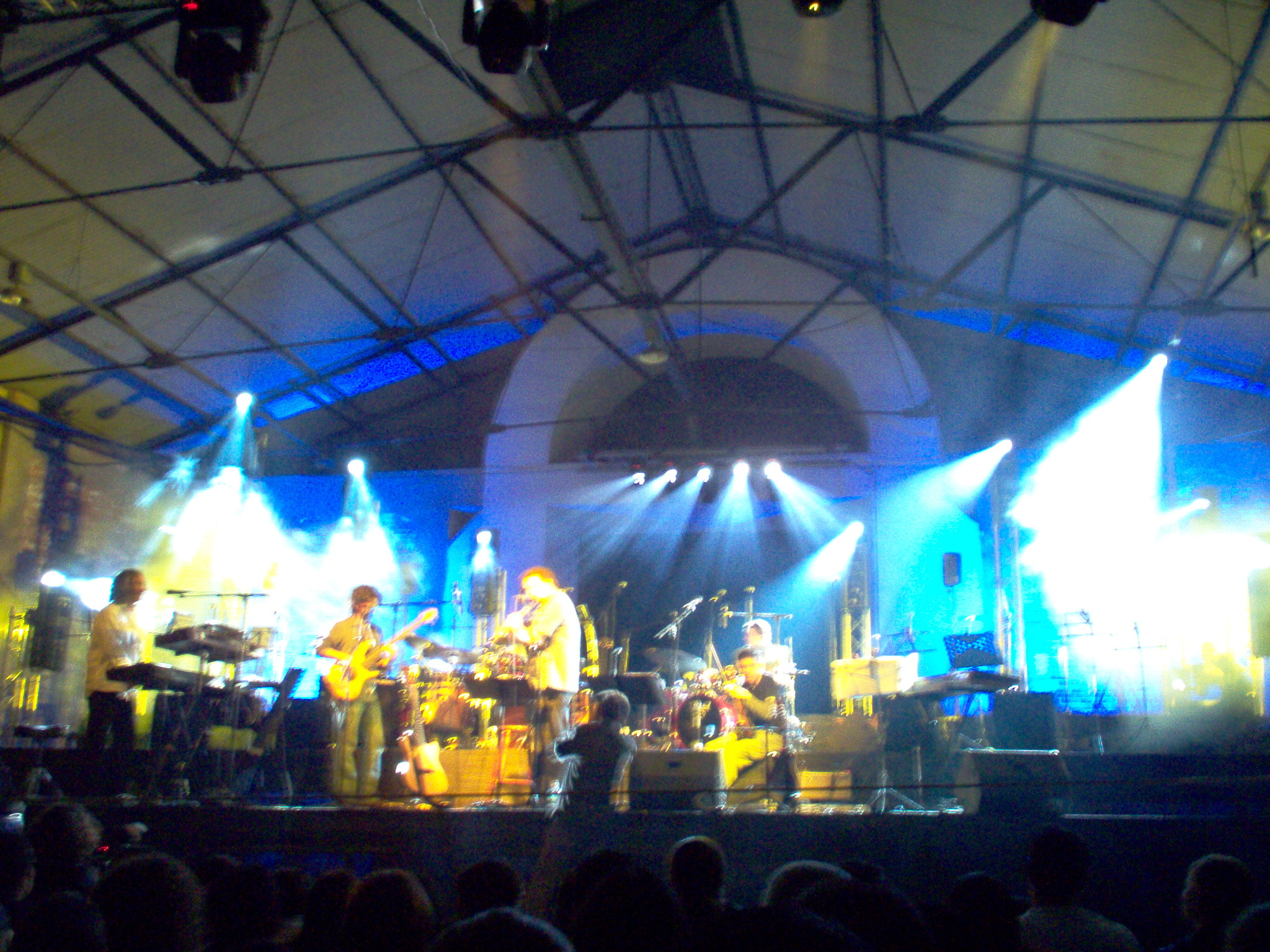
Malpais Band in Costa Rica

== Discography ==
=== Studio albums ===
List of studio albums, with selected details
Title	Album details	Certifications
Uno	Released: April 1, 2003; Label: Papaya Music; Format: CD	FONOTICA: Platinum
Historias de Nadie	Released: January 1, 2004; Label: Papaya Music; Format: CD	FONOTICA: Platinum
Un Día Lejano	Released: 2009; Label: Papaya Music; Format: CD	FONOTICA: Platinum
La Canción de Adán	Released: 2009; Label: Papaya Music; Format: CD	FONOTICA: Gold
Hay Niños Aqui	Released: 2010; Label: Papaya Music; Format: CD	FONOTICA: Gold
Volver a casa	Released: 2011; Label: Papaya Music; Format: CD	
Nada que olvidar	Released: 2018; Label: Papaya Music; Format: CD	

=== Live albums ===
List of live albums, with selected details
Title	Album details	Certifications
En Vivo	Released: December 1, 2006; Label: Papaya Music; Format: CD	FONOTICA: Platinum
