= Vivo: The Life of Gustav Meyrink =

2008 book by Mike Mitchell

- Author: Mike Mitchell
- Cover artist: Marie Lane
- Language: English
- Subject: Gustav Meyrink
- Genre: biography
- Publisher: Dedalus Books
- Publication date: 5 November 2008
- Publication place: United Kingdom
- Pages: 225
- ISBN: 978-1-903517-69-7

Vivo: The Life of Gustav Meyrink is a 2008 biography about the Austrian writer Gustav Meyrink, written by Mike Mitchell. It covers Meyrink's life and activities as a banker, occultist, satirist and writer of speculative fiction.

Mitchell had translated several of Meyrink's works into English and debuted as a biographer with Vivo. Publishers Weekly called the book "fascinating, extensive and a bit speculative", writing that its "examination of a dark, begrudging and sensational individual" makes it a "supremely entertaining biography".
