= Vivo (Coda album) =

Studio album by Coda
- Released: July 6, 2006
- Recorded: 2004–2005 at Echoes Studios
- Genres: Rock en Español; Hard rock
- Length: 46:44
- Label: Pro Disc
- Producer: Chava Aguilar

Coda chronology
| Nivel 3 (1997) | Vivo (2006) |

Vivo is the fourth album released by Mexican rock band Coda. It was released in 2006 after the band regrouped with an almost new line-up.

== Track listing ==
1. "Delirando"
2. "Firme"
3. "Simplemente Te Amo"
4. "Mitades"
5. "Terror Virtual"
6. "Te Extraño"
7. "Tras El Viento"
8. "Invisible"
9. "Zona"
10. "Vacío Infinito"
11. "Cambia El Canal"
12. "Tren Vagabundo"
13. "S. O. S."
14. "Dame Tu Corazón"
15. "Vampiro"
16. "No Te Das Cuenta"
17. "Chasing The Wind"
18. "Stand Firm"
19. "I Miss You"
20. "Aun" (Live)

== Personnel ==
- Salvador Aguilar – lead vocals
- Enrique Cuevas – guitars
- Iram Sanchez – drums
- Jordan Pisano – bass
- Leo Castellanos – keyboards
