= Emigrante (Tanghetto album) =

Emigrante (electrotango)

Studio album by Tanghetto
- Released: December 19, 2003
- Genre: Tango
- Label: Constitution Music
- Producer: Max Masri

Tanghetto chronology
Emigrante (electrotango) (2003)	Hybrid Tango (2004)

Emigrante (electrotango) is the debut album by Buenos Aires-based neo-tango band Tanghetto. The album was released in 2003, reaching gold sales in early 2005 and soon became platinum and double platinum. In 2004 Emigrante (electrotango) was nominated for a Latin Grammy Award.

Although it is instrumental album, there is an underlying concept through the project: how Argentina, historically a country of immigrants, became a country of emigrants during the economic crisis of 2001. All concepts, names and texts are by Max Masri. Max brought the main composition ideas and songs and also artistic production, while Diego played most of the instruments, co-composed all the songs and made most of the arrangements. The electronic programming was done by both Max and Diego.

The music of Emigrante is a balance between the electronically generated sounds and acoustic instruments (bandoneón, piano, and guitar).

Emigrante reached platinum sales in Argentina by 2006.

As of 2018, many of the songs included in this album are still played on multiple Argentine TV stations on a daily basis.

The album spawned the music video for the song Mente Frágil, a concept vídeo with LGBTQ themes that received MTV Latino rotation.

== Track listing and credits ==
1. Inmigrante (Immigrant) [4:02]
2. Una Llamada (One Call) [4:06]
3. Alexanderplatz Tango [4:03]
4. Al final todos se van (Everybody goes away in the end) [4:10]
5. Recursos Humanos (Human Resources) [3:33]
6. La Caída (The Fall) [4:48]
7. El Boulevard (The Boulevard) [3:53]
8. El Siguiente Capítulo (Next Chapter) [5:50]
9. Vida Moderna en 2/4 (Modern Life in 2/4) [4:08]
10. Montevideo [3:01]
11. Mente Frágil (Fragile Mind) [4:56]
12. Emigrante — Exilio del Alma (Emigrant — Exile of the Soul) [4:23]

== Players ==
Max Masri: synths, piano and programming
Diego S. Velazquez: guitars, piano, synths and programming
Daniel Ruggiero: bandoneon
