= The Jester Don John of Austria =

1632–1633 painting by Diego Velázquez

- El bufón don Juan de Austria (Spanish)
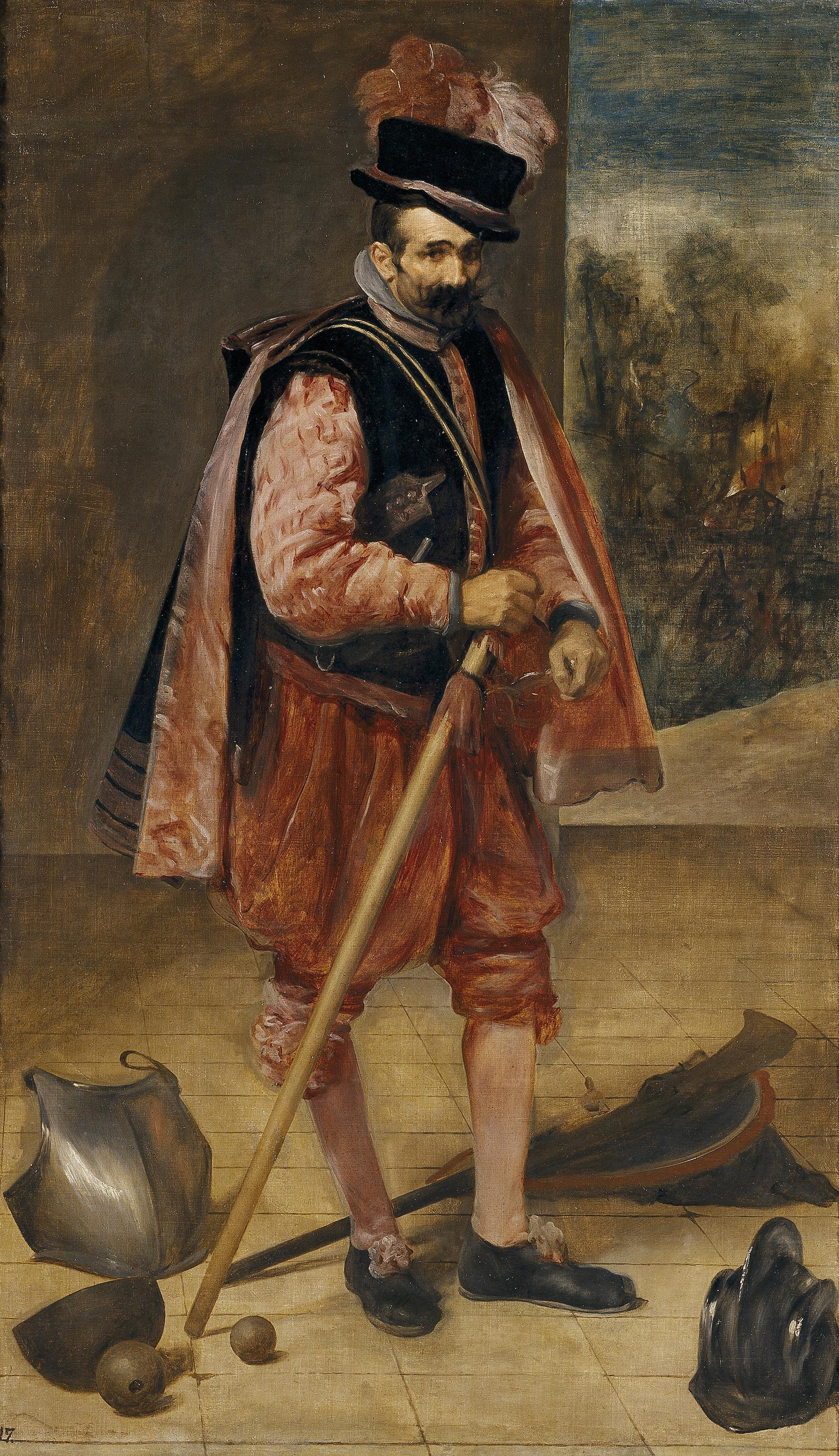
- Artist: Diego Velázquez
- Year: 1632–1633
- Medium: Oil on canvas
- Movement: Baroque
- Dimensions: 210 cm × 124.5 cm (83 in × 49.0 in)
- Location: Museo del Prado; Madrid

The Jester Don John of Austria (Spanish: El bufón Don Juan de Austria) is a Spanish Baroque painting by Diego Velázquez, completed around 1630-1650. It depicts a court jester dressed in an elaborate military costume and is part of Velázquez’s series of court jester portraits.

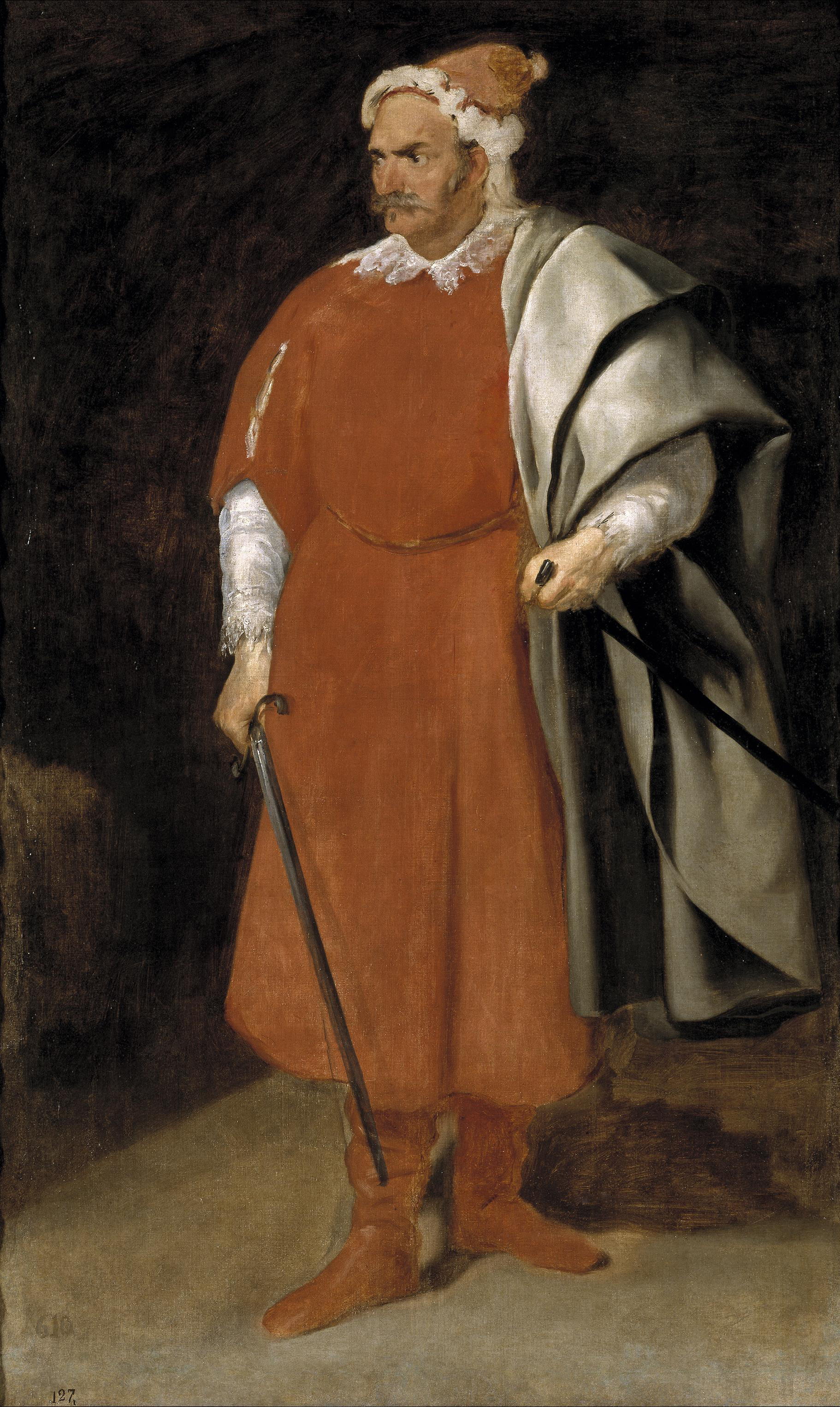
The Jester Barbarroja, Diego Velázquez, c. 1637–1640

It has been housed in the Palacio del Buen Retiro (1701-1716), the Royal Palace of Madrid (1772-1816), and the Real Academia de Bellas Artes de San Fernando (1816-1827). The painting is currently housed in the Museo del Prado in Madrid where it has resided since 1827.

== Description ==
Diego Velázquez’s The Jester Don John of Austria combines realism, satire, and social commentary. This painting depicts a jester of the Spanish court dressed in an exaggerated military costume. His left hand holds a baton while his right hand grips a sword. The individual is likely related to the 16th-century figure John of Austria (also known as Juan José of Austria), Charles V, Holy Roman Emperor's illegitimate son and King Philip II’s half-brother. John of Austria was a commander in the Spanish military and is known for his victory at the Battle of Lepanto where the Holy League (a collection of Catholic states) defeated the Ottoman Empire. His popularity even brought about concerns of his potential assumption of the Spanish throne its true heir. It is possible that the buffoon serves as a mockery of this famous figure.

The identity of the jester depicted in the painting remains debated by historians. It is believed that he was part of King Philip IV’s royal household where jesters and dwarves were common figures serving as entertainers, contrasting with the formality of court life. Unlike conventional depictions of jesters, this figure is not in a humorous or exaggerated pose. Instead, he is depicted in the attire of a commander, which mimics Jusepe de Ribera’s portrayal of Don Juan in his work Don Juan of Austria on Horseback. The trophies scattered on the floor and the naval battle scene in the background may further allude to Don Juan of Austria and his military success at the Battle of Lepanto.

It is believed that the individual depicted was a court fool or entertainer under King Philip IV. Archives list a man named Don Juan as an entertainer around the time the painting was thought to have been created. This work by Velázquez may parallel his other work, The Jester Barbarroja, which portrays Cristóbal de Castañeda y Pernia, a jester in Philip IV’s court. The Jester Barbarroja also depicts a jester outfitted in military attire with a stern look.

== Sources ==
- Aznar, Camón. Velázquez, 1964
- Tinterow, Gary, et al. Manet/Velázquez: The French Taste for Spanish Painting. New York: Metropolitan Museum of Art, 2003. ISBN 978-0-3000-9880-8
- Tomlinson, Janis. Velázquez, Painter and Courtier. NJ: Princeton University Press, 2002. ISBN 978-0-3000-3466-0
