= John Donald =

John Donald may refer to:

- John Stuart Donald (1861–1948), former Chief Commissioner of the North West Frontier Province of British India
- John Donald (Wisconsin politician) (1869–1934), former Secretary of State of Wisconsin
- John Donald (jewellery designer) (1928–2023), British jeweller
- John Donald (footballer) (born 2000), Spanish footballer
- John Donald, academic book imprint of Birlinn
