= Tanghetto =

Argentinian neo tango and electronic tango music project

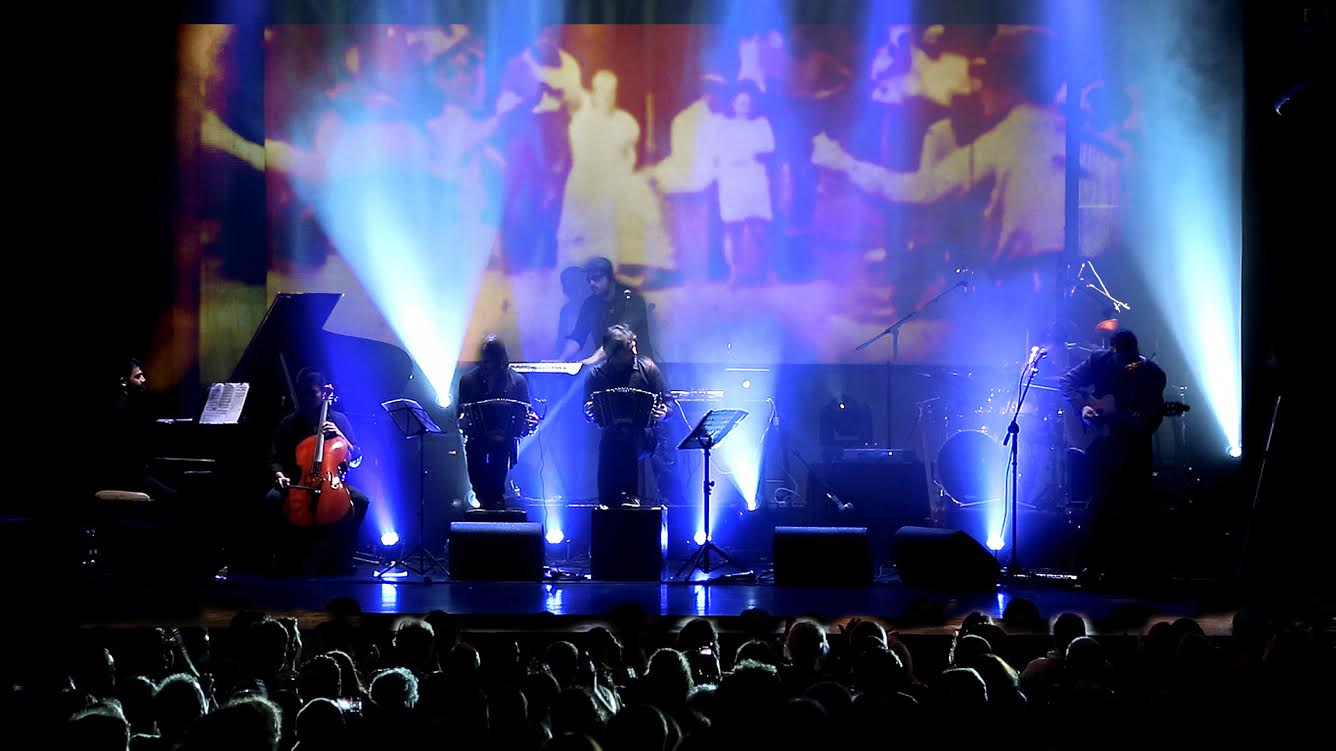

Background information
- Origin: Buenos Aires, Argentina
- Genres: Tango music, electronic music, world music, jazz fusion
- Years active: 2003–present
- Label: Constitution Music
- Website: tanghetto.net

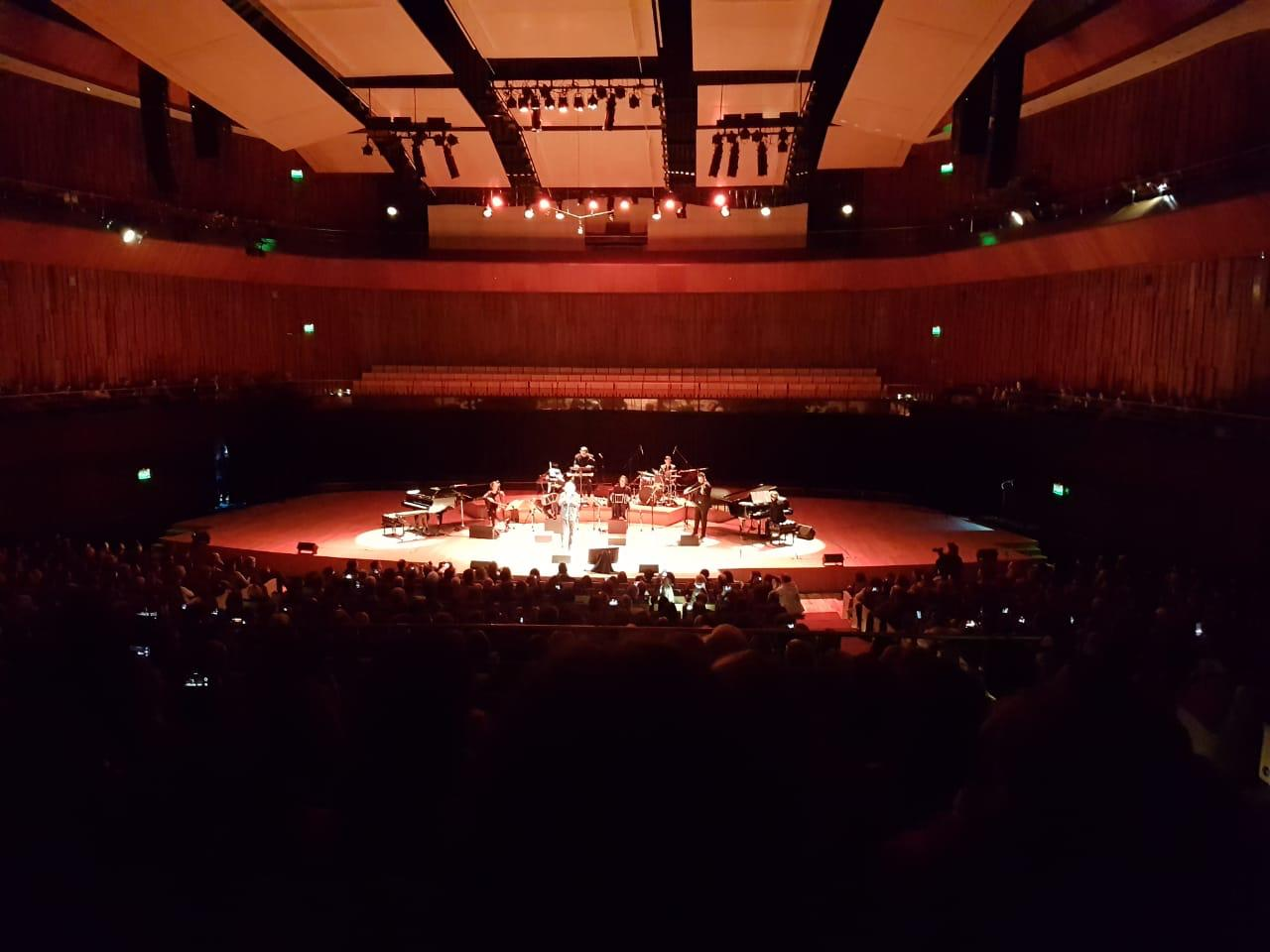
Tanghetto performing live at the Centro Cultural Kirchner Symphony Hall celebrating 15 years of their debut album, August 2019.

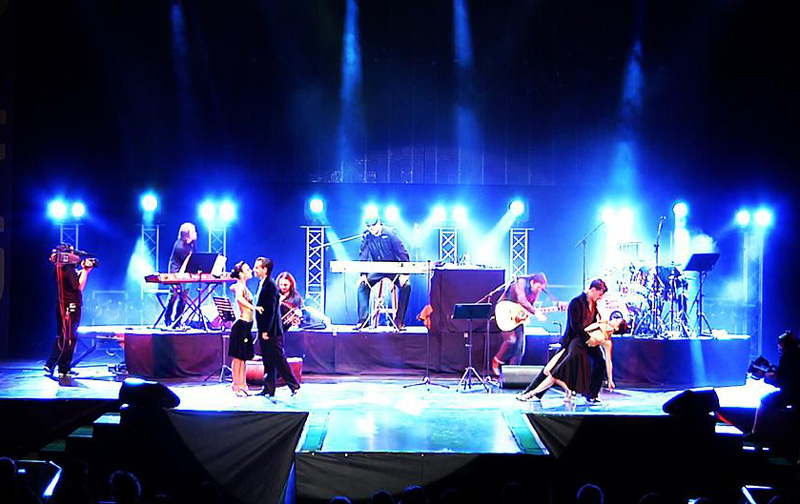
Tanghetto performing live at the Milano Forum Assago with guest tango dancers on stage (Latinoamericando Expo 2013, Milan, Italy).

Tanghetto is an Argentinian neotango and electronic tango music project created and led by musician and producer Max Masri. The group has won the Latin Grammy for Best Tango Album and two Gardel Awards. In 2025, the Legislature of Buenos Aires declared Tanghetto to be of cultural interest to the city. The band is based in Buenos Aires, Argentina.

The style of Tanghetto is a blend of tango and electronic music and is also influenced by world music and jazz. The main feature of their music, apart from the balance of electronic and ethnic sounds, is the strong presence of melody and song structure. Tanghetto uses innovation and technology as another musical instrument.

== History ==
In the late 1990s, Max Masri began experimenting in the studio with the fusion of electronic music and tango. By 2001, he had named his studio project Electrotango, developing ideas and recordings that would later give rise to what became the foundation of Tanghetto — several of those early pieces would eventually evolve into Tanghetto songs such as Biorritmo and Inmigrante, among others.

By 2003, Masri was determined to take the project beyond the studio. He invited Diego Velázquez to join, drawn by his musical versatility and their prior collaboration on 020. Masri had already defined the artistic direction: a fusion of tango with electronic and house music, approached through minimalist aesthetics and centered on electronics, piano, and bandoneón. As the project’s main songwriter, Masri envisioned Velázquez contributing to the songwriting and arrangements, bringing his musical sensibility into the process.

In August 2003, Masri introduced the name Tanghetto — a combination of tango and ghetto — inspired by Argentine emigrant communities who, while living abroad, built small “tango ghettos.” The name captured the spirit of cultural belonging and creative reinvention.

With Velázquez on board, they refined Masri’s earlier compositions and co-wrote new material. Daniel Ruggiero was invited to record the bandoneón parts for what became Emigrante (Electrotango), Tanghetto’s first album. Velázquez’s arrival also marked the beginning of the project’s transition from a studio concept to a live group. He became a founding member of Tanghetto’s first incarnation, contributing his musicianship and creativity to the early recordings and performances.

Masri has remained Tanghetto’s artistic leader and principal composer ever since, yet his work with Velázquez represents an important chapter in Tanghetto’s story.

Tanghetto debuted its groundbreaking album Emigrante (electrotango) in 2003. The work was inspired by the 2001 Argentine crisis and the wave of young emigrants who sought new horizons abroad — a reflection of loss, hope, and reinvention. Emigrante was nominated for the Latin Grammy Awards of 2004 in the category Best Instrumental Album and later achieved platinum status in Argentina (2006) and double platinum (2009). According to the Los Angeles Times, Tanghetto is “the most seductive electrotango band based in Buenos Aires,” and Emigrante is “marked by its languid melodies, its smoky textures, and the kind of delicate piano lines that would make Massive Attack proud.”

The album’s success placed Tanghetto at the center of a new movement within tango — one that bridged tradition and technology, Buenos Aires and the world. They performed at numerous venues in the city, including the Festival y Mundial de Tango, and even at the iconic Obelisco de Buenos Aires. In December 2004, Tanghetto released a side-project album, Hybrid Tango, where world-music influences such as flamenco, candombe, and jazz blended naturally with their electronic style. The album also featured the erhu on two tracks — the first known use of the Chinese instrument in tango — and received a nomination for the Latin Grammy Awards of 2005 in the Best Tango Album category.

In October 2005, Tanghetto released Buenos Aires Remixed, containing twelve remixed versions of Tanghetto songs and two cover versions: “Enjoy the Silence” by Depeche Mode and “Blue Monday” by New Order. Their version of “Blue Monday” became an alternative-radio hit in the United States and a favorite on Los Angeles’ KCRW. Buenos Aires Remixed reached gold status in early 2007 and became their second platinum album later that year. Around the same period, Tanghetto began releasing videos that combined social commentary and imagery of Buenos Aires, such as Tangocrisis and Barrio Sur. In July 2006, the group released its first DVD, Live in Buenos Aires.

In 2007, Diego Velázquez officially resigned from Tanghetto. Although no longer part of the project’s formal lineup, he continued to collaborate in studio recordings over the following years and played with the band whenever the situations made it possible, until early 2018. Whenever he participated, he approached the work with the same commitment and professionalism he had shown as a member. His contributions to the group remain undeniable and are recognised as part of Tanghetto’s musical legacy.

After consistently touring Europe and the Americas, the band recorded its next studio album, El Miedo a la Libertad, named after Erich Fromm’s classic essay Fear of Freedom. Released in 2008, it reflected on freedom, fear, and modern life through Tanghetto’s distinctive lens. The album earned a Gardel Award in 2009, consolidating the project’s reputation as one of the leading voices in contemporary tango.

Later that year, following their first major tour of Brazil, Tanghetto released Más Allá del Sur (2009), a richly melodic album that looked to the southern landscapes of Argentina and Uruguay for inspiration. It was nominated for another Gardel Award in 2010. The group’s global reach continued with Vivo (Live Around the World) (2011), recorded during international tours and featuring innovative versions of “Seven Nation Army” by The White Stripes and “Computer Love” by Kraftwerk. A companion release, Vivo Milonguero (2012), offered unplugged and orchestral performances, earning Tanghetto a second Gardel Award.

In 2012, the concept album Incidental Tango further expanded Masri’s vision of tango as the incidental music of Buenos Aires life. The record featured pianist-arranger Aldo Di Paolo and led to extensive tours through Europe and Latin America, including the O2 Arena in London. In 2014, Tanghetto followed with Hybrid Tango II, a mix of new material and unreleased works that garnered a third Latin Grammy nomination. https://www.cmtv.com.ar/biografia/show.php?bnid=2340&banda=Tanghetto

The mid-2010s saw Tanghetto explore new directions with Progressive Tango (2015), whose title track became their most-streamed song on Spotify, and Desenchufado (2016), an intimate acoustic project nominated for the 2017 Gardel Awards. In 2018, Tanghetto made its debut at New York’s Lincoln Center, performing before an audience of 3,000.

In 2019, the group celebrated the fifteenth anniversary of Emigrante (Electrotango) with a landmark concert at La Ballena Azul Symphony Hall (CCK), joined by Argentine music legends Pedro Aznar, Sandra Mihanovich, and Nito Mestre.

At the dawn of the pandemic, Tanghetto performed at iconic Buenos Aires venues such as Torcuato Tasso, La Viruta, and Salón Canning, before shifting to virtual concerts and televised specials. In 2020, they released Reinventango, nominated for the 2021 Gardel Awards in the Best Tango Orchestra category — a historic achievement for an electrotango ensemble. In 2021, they issued Tanghetto Plays Piazzolla, a heartfelt tribute to Ástor Piazzolla, which earned another Latin Grammy nomination. Grammy.com described Reinventango as “a rugged masterpiece of melancholy melodies and sharp beats… setting a gold standard for all tango records to follow.”

In 2023, Tanghetto released Argentinxs, an album featuring ten renowned Argentine collaborators including Fito Páez, León Gieco, Pedro Aznar, Adriana Varela, and Leo García, among others. The record weaves contemporary tango with elements of rock and pop, highlighting the project’s ongoing innovation and openness to diverse musical languages. That same year, Tanghetto celebrated its 20th anniversary with concerts at La Ballena Azul (CCK) and the Teatro San Martín, two milestones that reflected its deep connection with Buenos Aires and its lasting influence on the evolution of tango.

In 2025, the Buenos Aires City Legislature officially recognised Tanghetto as a “Destacado de la Cultura de la Ciudad de Buenos Aires”, honouring more than two decades of artistic innovation, international touring, and contributions to contemporary tango. Tanghetto won the Latin Grammy for "Mejor Álbum de Tango" (Best Tango Album) in November 2025. They received the award for their album En Vivo – 20 Años, which features a compilation of their performances across various theaters in Buenos Aires.This marked a historic milestone for the Argentine band, as they became the first-ever electrotango group to win a Latin Grammy in the Tango category. The 26th Annual Latin Grammy Awards ceremony took place on November 13, 2025, at the Mandaly Bay and at the MGM Grand Garden Arena in Las Vegas.

== Current live lineup ==
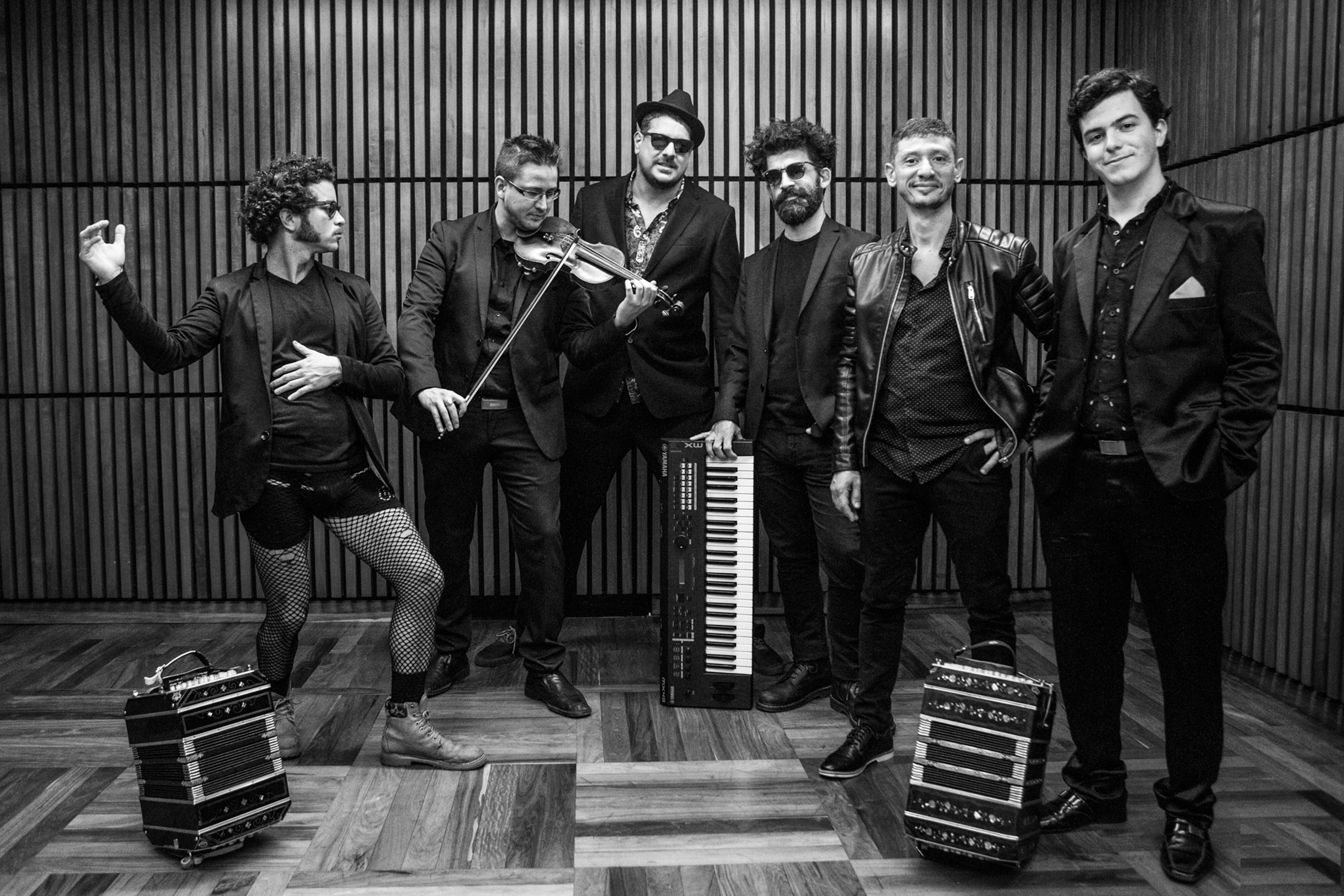
Tanghetto posing with the 2019 lineup.

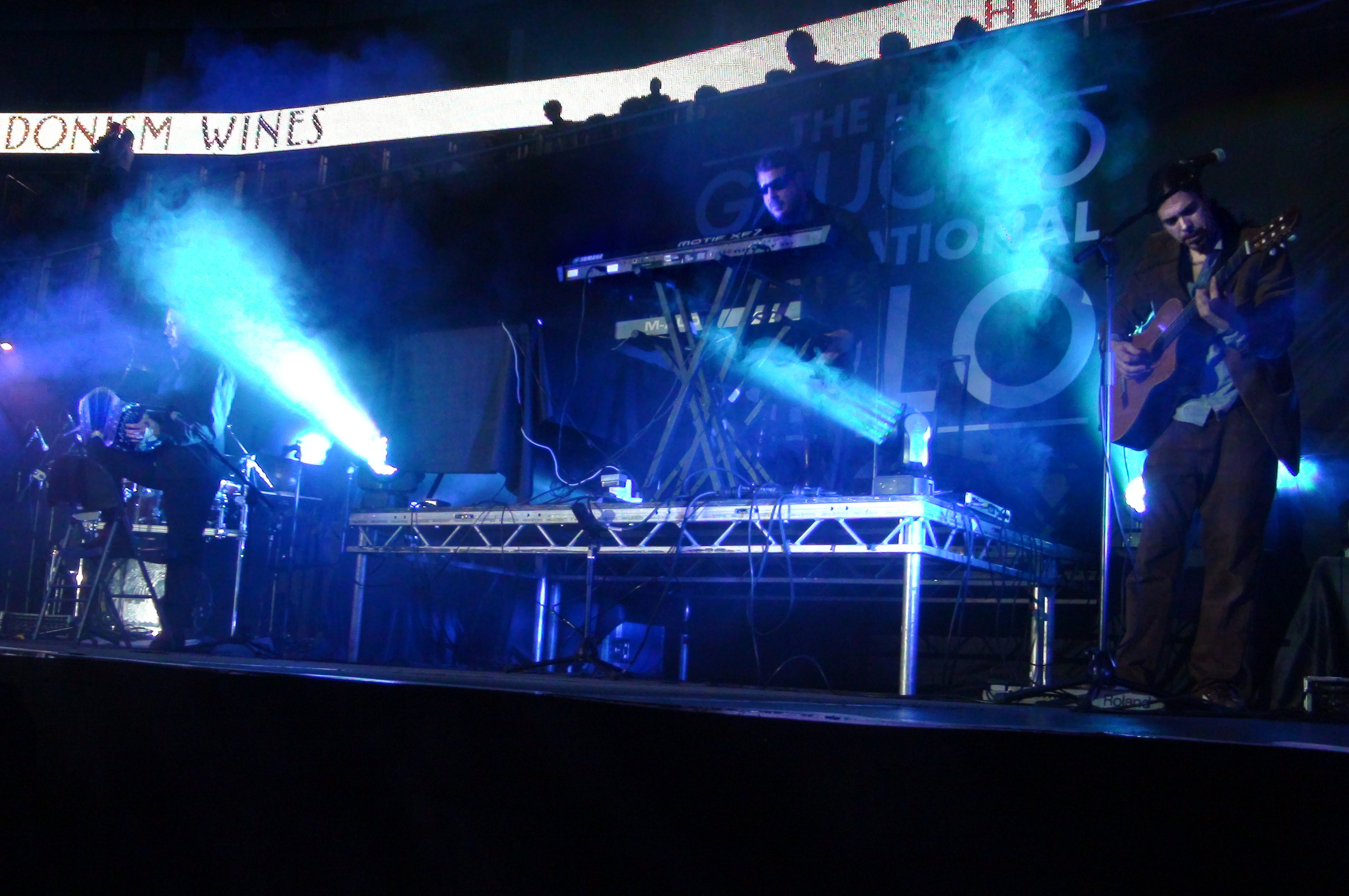
Tanghetto live at the O2 Arena, London, May 2013.

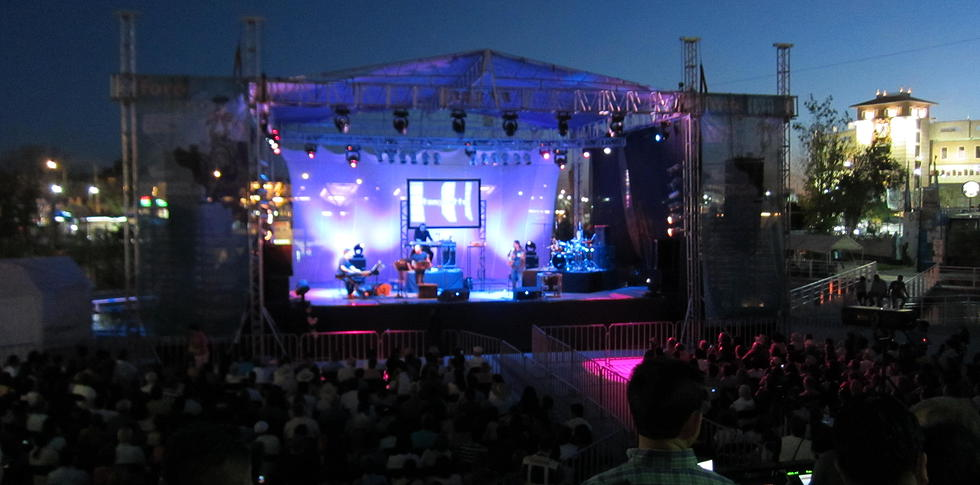
Tanghetto live at the 2013 Feria de San Marcos, Aguascalientes, Mexico.

- Max Masri: synthesizers and programming, vocal
- Antonio Boyadjian, piano
- Daniel Corrado, drums
- Octavio Bianchi, violin
- Joaquín Benitez, bandoneon
- Regina Manfredi, Chelo

== Past musicians ==
- Diego S. Velázquez: guitars, bass, synth, co-songwriting, arranging.
- Chao Xu: violoncello and erhu
- Alessio Santoro: acoustic/electronic drums and percussion
- Leandro Ragusa: bandoneon
- Matías Rubino: bandoneon
- Martín Cecconi: bandoneon
- Nicolás Tognola: bandoneon
- Federico Vazquez: bandoneon
- Aldo Di Paolo, acoustic and electric piano, arranging

== Discography ==
Studio Albums

- 2003: Emigrante (electrotango)
- 2004: Hybrid Tango
- 2008: El Miedo a la Libertad
- 2009: Más Allá del Sur
- 2012: Incidental Tango
- 2014: Hybrid Tango II
- 2015: Progressive Tango
- 2020: Reinventango
- 2021: Tanghetto plays Piazzolla
- 2023: ARGENTINXS

Live Albums, Remixes, Special Editions

- 2005: Buenos Aires Remixed (twelve remixes & two covers)
- 2010: VIVO (live album, includes a 3-track bonus studio EP)
- 2011: VIVO Milonguero (second volume of VIVO, with 14 new live tracks and a 3-track bonus studio EP)
- 2016: Desenchufado (recorded live in-studio) (limited edition cd)
- 2025. En Vivo 20 años (eight live recordings, seven from the 20 year anniversary tour + one bonus track)

Singles (Promo or digital)

- 2003: Inmigrante
- 2004: Una Llamada
- 2004: Más de lo Mismo
- 2005: Alexanderplatz Tango
- 2005: Enjoy The Silence
- 2006: Barrio Sur
- 2006: El Boulevard
- 2007: Blue Monday
- 2007: Mente Frágil
- 2008: Buscando Camorra
- 2008: Tangocrisis
- 2008: Englishman in New York
- 2009: La Milonga
- 2010: Tango Místico
- 2011: Buscando Camorra Live
- 2012: Yumbera
- 2013: Gallo Ciego (single)
- 2014: Quién me quita lo bailado
- 2015: ¿Cuánto Más?
- 2016: Progressive Tango
- 2018: Cono Sur
- 2021: Transtango
- 2023: Tiempo
- 2023: Carabelas Nada

== Videography ==
Almost all the videos were directed or created by Max Masri

Year	Song	Album	Notes
2006	Barrio Sur	Hybrid Tango	First Tanghetto video to be played on MTV.
2006	Tangocrisis	Hybrid Tango	Contains uncensored footage from the December 2001 riots in Argentina
2006	Biorritmo	Tangophobia Vol. 1	Track later re-recorded and included in the Más Allá del Sur album
2007	Blue Monday	Buenos Aires Remixed	New Order cover, shot in London in 2006
2007	Mente Frágil	Emigrante (electrotango)	First tango and electrotango video with an LGBTQ story. It received MTV rotation.
2008	Alexanderplatz Tango	Emigrante (electrotango)	Shot in Berlin, Germany
2008	El Duelo	Hybrid Tango	Shot in Rome, Italy
2009	Buscando Camorra	El Miedo a la Libertad	
2010	Tango Místico	Más Allá del Sur	
2010	La Milonga	Más Allá del Sur	Unofficial video
2014	Quién Me Quita Lo Bailado	Hybrid Tango II	Archive footage from the 1950s in Montevideo, Uruguay
2021	Himno	video release	Tanghetto with multiple tango dancers
2021	Transtango	Reinventango	Tanghetto with non-binary dancers
2025	Juego Irreal	ARGENTINXS	Tanghetto with Adriana Varela with images of our distopic reality.

== Awards ==
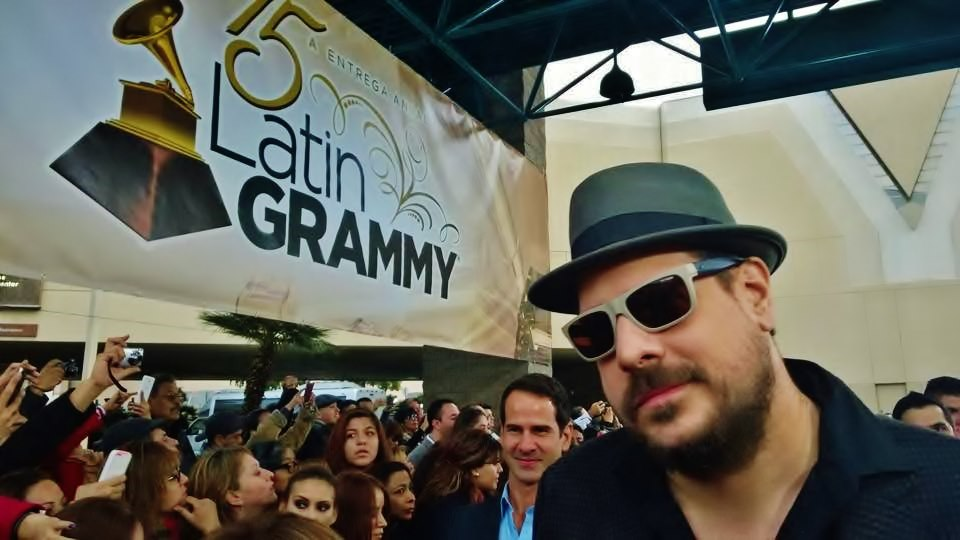
Max Masri, leader and founder of Tanghetto, attending the Latin Grammys in Las Vegas, Nevada 2014

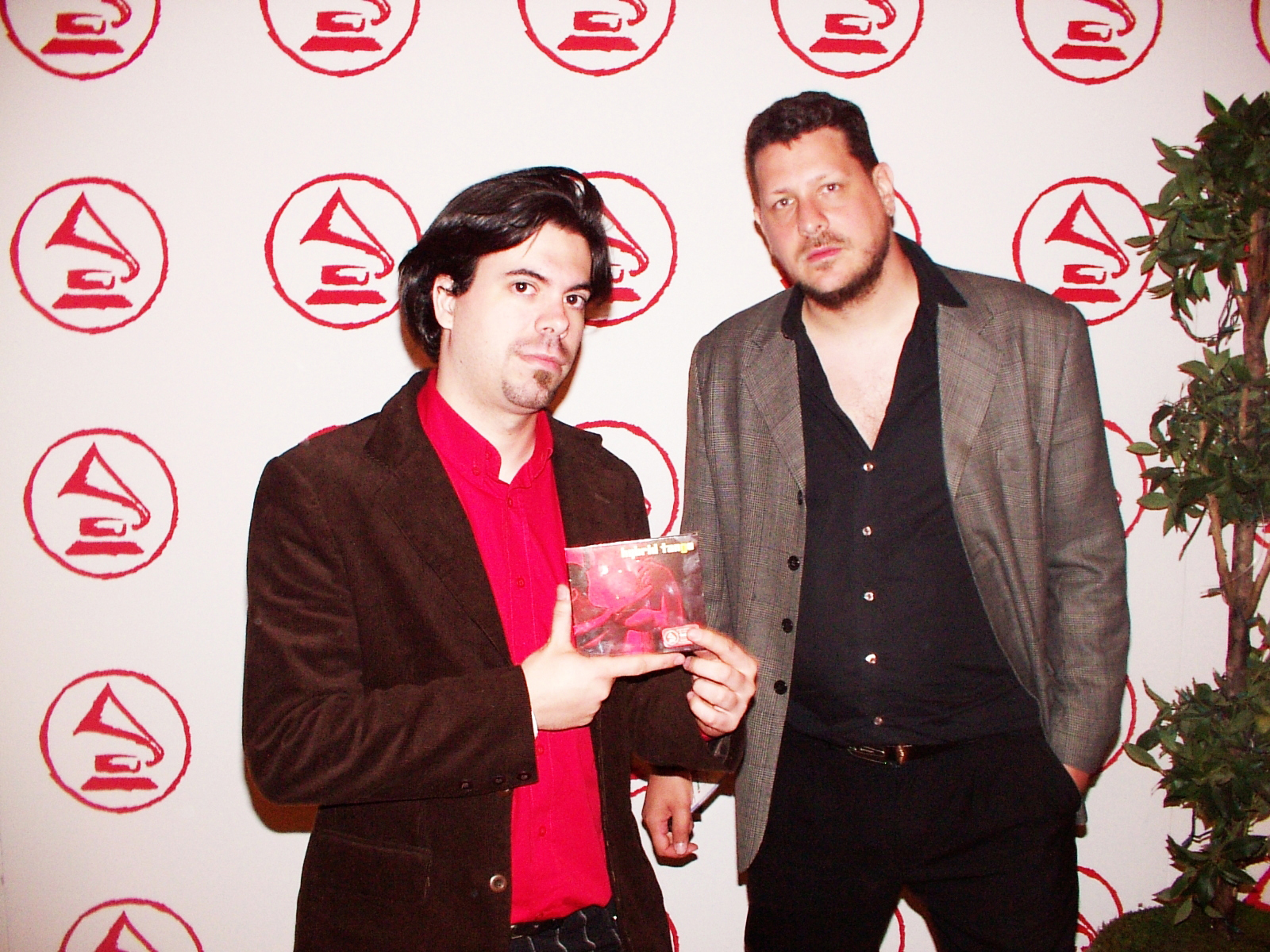
Tanghetto (Velázquez and Masri) at the 2005 Latin Grammy Awards ceremony, Los Angeles CA.

Tanghetto has received widespread recognition for their contributions to the neotango and electronic tango genres. The band won the prestigious Latin Grammy for Best Tango Album in 2025 for their live album En Vivo 20 Años. Since their first nomination in 2004, they have consistently earned accolades at both the Latin Grammy Awards and the Premios Gardel. Notably, they won their first Gardel Award in 2009 with El Miedo a la Libertad, and in 2021, they became the first electrotango band to be nominated for "Best Tango Orchestra" at the Gardel Awards.

Year	Album	Award	Category	Result
2004	Emigrante (electrotango)	Latin Grammy	Best Instrumental Album	Nominated
2005	Hybrid Tango	Latin Grammy	Best Tango Album	Nominated
2009	El Miedo a la Libertad	Premios Gardel	Best Electronic Tango Album	Won
2010	Más Allá del Sur	Premios Gardel	Best Instrumental / Fusion / World Music Album	Nominated
2011	VIVO	Premios Gardel	Best Alternative Tango Orchestra Album	Nominated
2012	VIVO Milonguero	Premios Gardel	Best Alternative Tango Album	Won
2013	Incidental Tango	Premios Gardel	Best Alternative Tango Album	Nominated
2014	Hybrid Tango II	Latin Grammy	Best Tango Album	Nominated
2016	Progressive Tango	Premios Gardel	Best Alternative Tango Album	Nominated
2017	Desenchufado	Premios Gardel	Best Alternative Tango Album	Nominated
2021	Reinventango	Premios Gardel	Best Tango Orchestra/Band Album	Nominated
2021	Tanghetto plays Piazzolla	Latin Grammy	Best Tango Album	Nominated
2023	ARGENTINXS	Latin Grammy	Best Tango Album	Nominated
2025	En Vivo 20 Años	Latin Grammy	Best Tango Album	Won
