= Vivo Class =

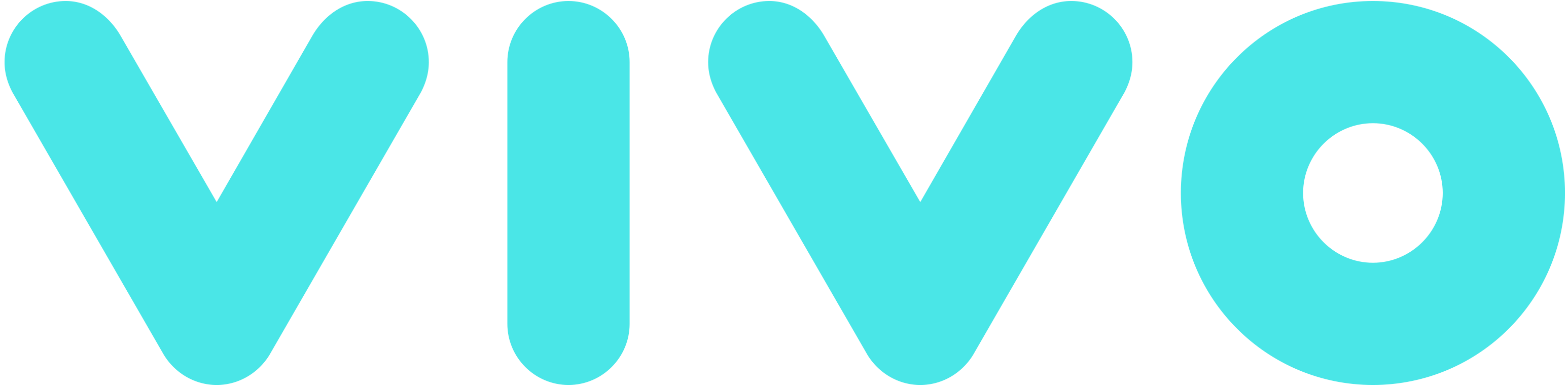
- New corporate logo of Vivo.
- Company type: Private
- Available in: English
- Founded: London, UK (2007)
- Area served: United Kingdom, United States, Australia, Thailand
- Owner: Vivo Rewards Limited
- Founders: George Grima, Sam Rickett
- Industry: Education
- Products: School Positive Behaviour platform
- Website: www.vivoclass.com
- Registration: Required
- Launched: 2007
- Current status: Active

Vivo Class (formerly Vivo Miles) is a private company based in London, UK that sells a web-based rewards system to schools. Founded in 2007, it was first used at Westminster Academy in London.

In August 2014, Vivo Miles was rebranded as Vivo Class for teachers.

== Rewards in Schools ==
Rewards systems are implemented in schools to praise students for positive actions, stimulating a voluntary and progressive improvement in their behaviour and increasing their motivation towards the achievement of academic objectives. Vivo Miles is a system of extrinsic rewards based on the principles of the Token economy and positive reinforcement. There has long been a debate about the use of extrinsic rewards and the effect that they may, or may not have on pupils' motivation.

== Mechanism ==
Vivo Class uses a simulated economic system where the currency are electronic points called Vivos (pronounced Vee-vos). School teachers award their students Vivos for their achievements and positive actions according to the reward criteria set by their tutors and school management. Every school customises the rewards platform in line with their own goals based upon their academic initiatives, objectives and ethos. Teachers have access to an online platform where they can manage the number of points or Vivos awarded to every student.

Each pupil gets a private online profile where they can check how many points they have earned and know the actions they were rewarded for as well as the teacher or member of the school staff that awarded those points. Students can redeem their points in an online catalogue where they can choose from a range of products approved by the school management and partly selected by them in consensus.

== Financial Learning ==
One intention is that pupils are introduced to the concepts of economy and personal finance in a context that emulates the socio-political system in which they are immersed which helps prepare them for real-life situations such as the planning and control of their own finances.

Students have a currency (Vivos points) and a plastic card similar to a bank account card. Students decide how to manage the points they have earned. They can save their points and earn interest, accumulate them, or trade them for products. Students can only carry out transactions with the card within the Vivo platform. Students can also choose to donate their points to designated charities or to partner schools in developing countries, all at the discretion of the school leadership team.

== Parental involvement ==
Vivo Class has a platform for parents to monitor their child's activity online and be aware of their achievements and the way they have chosen to spend their points.

== Financial Value ==
For schools based in the United Kingdom, each Vivo point has an approximate value of 1 penny, in Great British Sterling. This can be seen in their online shop, where any voucher costs the same number of Vivo points as the voucher's worth in pence.

== Awards and nominations ==
In 2010 Vivo Miles was the winner at BETT Awards in the Leadership and Management Solutions category.

Vivo Miles was shortlisted for the EducationInvestor Awards 2011, for "Use of Educational Technology".

== See also ==
- Behavior management
- Classroom management
- Every Child Matters
