= Electrocutango =

Norwegian musical group

Electrocutango is an electrotango project founded by Sverre Indris Joner, based in Oslo, Norway.

Their first album Felino is mainly original music created for TanGhost, a tango/theater performance based on Henrik Ibsen's play Ghosts, directed by Per-Olav Sørensen (2004). The show was choreographed by famous Argentinian tango dancer Pablo Verón, who also acted in the performance. The music was awarded the prestigious Norwegian Edvard Award for "Best Music composed to stage/film/other art forms" in 2005. In 2006, the performance toured theaters worldwide, visiting the Royal Dramatic Theatre in Stockholm, Ivan Vazov National Theatre in Bulgaria, and also theaters in Prague, Helsinki, The Faeroe Islands, Shanghai and Beijing.

Electrocutango released their second CD, Adrenalina, in April 2011. The release-tour included venues in Buenos Aires like Club Catedral, Sanata Bar, Notorious and La Viruta. During their concert in Academia Nacional de tango, Sverre Indris Joner was given the honorary title "Academico Correspondiente" of the academy by the president Horacio Ferrer.

During their tour to Buenos Aires Electrocutango collaborated with the French VJ Pierre Malacarnet who was making live VJ-ing and projections during their shows. A video of the song "Tango del Gringo" was filmed during the tour and is currently present on YouTube and other sites.

The third album "Contrastes" is being released summer 2021 with all songs released as digital singles.

== Members ==
The project-members on the first CD Felino are

Sverre Indris Joner - piano, composer, producer, programmer, arranger.

Odd Hannisdal - violin.

Frode Larsen - violin.

Steinar Haugerud - double bass.

Per Arne Glorvigen - bandoneón on tracks "Victoriosa" and "A Fuego Violento".

Julia Zenko - vocals on "Renacere" and "Sin Piel".

The project-members on the second CD Adrenalina are:

Sverre Indris Joner - piano, composer, producer, programmer, arranger.

Odd Hannisdal - violin.

Mikael Augustsson - bandoneón.

Steinar Haugerud - double-bass.

Antonio Torner - drums.

Julia Zenko - vocals on "Yo soy maria".

The project-members on the third CD Contrastes are:

Sverre Indris Joner - piano, composer, producer, programmer, arranger.

Odd Hannisdal - violin.

Andreas Rokseth - bandoneón.

Steinar Haugerud - double-bass.

Andreas Bye - drums.

Viktoria Anchissi Joner- vocals on "Penumbra".
