= Hybrid Tango =

Studio album by Tanghetto
- Released: December 10, 2004
- Genre: Tango, electronica, world music, jazz
- Label: Constitution Music
- Producer: Max Masri

Tanghetto chronology
Emigrante (electrotango) (2003)	Hybrid Tango (2004)	Buenos Aires Remixed (2005)

Hybrid Tango was a side project by the members of Buenos Aires–based electronic neo-tango band Tanghetto. Retroactively it was considered a Tanghetto album and some of the songs released in this album became regulars in Tanghetto's live setlists.

Released in December 2004, Hybrid Tango contains twelve instrumental tracks in which, apart from the blend of electronic music and tango that is the distinctive sound of Tanghetto, there are plenty of world-music styles such as flamenco, candombe, and jazz. Acoustic sounds (bandoneón, piano, guitar, cello, and even the Chinese stringed instrument, the erhu) are more predominant than in Tanghetto's debut album Emigrante (Electrotango). The album was produced and mixed by Max Masri, and co-produced by Diego S. Velázquez. All songs are composed by Masri and Velázquez.

The album was nominated for a Latin Grammy Award in 2005 and reached gold status in Argentina.

== Track listing ==
1. Más de lo mismo (More of the same) [4:58]
2. Barrio Sur [4:45]
3. Calles de Piedra (Streets of stone) [3:30]
4. Lo que nunca fue (Something that never was) [4:30]
5. El Deseo (The Desire) [4:38]
6. El Duelo (The Mourning) [3:30]
7. Tangocrisis [3:53]
8. Sombra (Shadow) [3:58]
9. La Muerte del Prejuicio (Death of a prejudice) [4:10]
10. El Solitario (The Lonely One) [4:30]
11. Miedo a Vivir (Afraid to live) [4:04]
12. Sálvese quien pueda (Women and children first) [3:33]

== Musicians ==
Max Masri: synths, piano and programming
Diego S. Velázquez: guitars, synths, piano and programming
Chao Xu: violoncello, erhu
Daniel Ruggiero: bandoneón
Hugo Satorre: bandoneón
Gabriel Clenar: piano
Matias Novelle: drums and percussion
Diego Tejedor: violin
