= Elvira Santamaría =

Elvira Santamaría also known by the artistic name of Elvira (1929 in La Tablada – July 8, 1999) was acclaimed as a ballet dancer, milonguera and choreographer of Argentine tango. She was known worldwide for her role as a cast member of the show Tango Argentino, aired for the first time in 1983, for which she was nominated with the other ballerinas in 1986 at the Tony Awards for best choreographer. She danced with her husband Virulazo (Jorge Martín Orcaizaguirre), and they presented themselves artistically as Virulazo y Elvira.

== Biography ==
Elvira Santamaría was born in 1929 in La Tablada in the Greater Buenos Aires, Argentina. In 1959 she casually re-encountered her first boyfriend, Jorge Martín Orcaizaguirre, known as Virulazo, who was known as an Argentino Dancer. She started her life partnership for the rest of her life, under the artistic name Virulazo and Elvira. Virulazo recorded these moments of dance in the following way:

Un día yo andaba arriba de un caballo allá por La Tablada y en eso veo pasar un colectivo con Elvira adentro, le hice señas para que bajara, pero nada, entonces fui galopando detrás del colectivo y al final se bajó porque si no la seguía hasta su casa. Conversamos y aquí estamos. (translation: One day I was riding a horse around La Tablada and saw a bus carrying Elvira pass by, I gestured that she should to get off, but she didn't, so I galloped after the bus; she eventually got off because otherwise I would have followed her home. We talked and here we are.)

— Virulazo

In the 1960s, with the rise of rock, the tango ceased to be a big music genre and dance for young people:

...la época dura de los años 60 cuando los programas de rock en televisión nos hicieron pasar un hambre terrible, bailábamos por unas monedas. Aguantamos sólo Juan Carlos Copes y yo. La bohemia es linda pero te cagás de hambre... A comienzo de los '80 decido abandonar el baile. (translation: ... hard times came in the '60s with rock shows on television causing us to face starvation, we danced for pennies. We alone endured, Juan Carlos Copes and I. Bohemianism is fun, but you starve...At the beginning of the '80s I decided to give up dancing.)

— Virulazo

Virulazo and Elvira then worked in quiniela (illegal gambling), when they were contacted in 1983 by Juan Carlos Copes for a trial of a tango programme that Claudio Segovia and Héctor Orezzoli wanted to do in París: Tango Argentino. Virulazo then weighed 126 kilos, was 57 years old, and had five children and six grandchildren. Segovia, on seeing him arrive, looked at a Copes incredulously; Copes just said "watch them dance":

"Míralos bailar", fue todo lo que dije. Cuando Virula arrancó su baile, Claudio no podía creer lo que veía, que semejante hombre pareciera flotar, ¡no pisaba el suelo y Elvira hacía firuletes a su alrededor! Eran como Brutus y Olivia, algo diferente, como quería Claudio. Así quedaron incorporados Virulazo y Elvira.

— Juan Carlos Copes

Years later, Claudio Segovia said of Virulazo and Elvira:

La ferocidad con que se entregaba, la unión de belleza y fuerza que lograba con Elvira, quedó en la mente de todos los que lo hayan visto.

— Claudio Segovia

Argentine Tango proved a worldwide success, in addition to promoting the revival of tango everywhere. Virulazo and Elvira took part in all shows and became global celebrities. In 1985 they presented the show on Broadway, where the entire dance company was nominated for the Tony Award for Best Choreography.

Con lo que gané en las últimas giras me compré tres casas, un camión y dos autos, para mis hijos, ahora salgo algunas veces más, junto unos dólares y ¡chau!, me retiro. Cada gira son cinco o seis meses y para es un sufrimiento, es como estar "encanutado" en Alcatraz. Sufro lo peor que le puede pasar a un hombre, estar solo en la muchedumbre. En Japón me paraba en una esquina y me rodeaban doscientos millones de "ponjas", y no entendía un carajo lo que decían. Entraba en un restaurante, pedía un chorizo y me lo traían con miel, ¡una cosa de locos! Se morfan el pescado crudo como los indios ¡Dejame de joder! Nunca comí tanto pollo y tallarines como en Japón. Hay gente a la que le llamará la atención, pero a mi no. A mi me atrae un buen vino, un asado con los amigos, los jilgueritos que tengo en el fondo de mi casa.

— Virulazo

In 1990 Virulazo died, at age 63, from lung cancer caused by smoking. Ten years later, in 1999, Elvira, died at 70 years of age.
