= Alberto Paz =

Argentine historian (1943–2014)

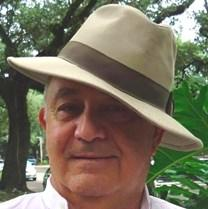
- Born: Alberto Bernardino Paz; April 16, 1943; Tucuman, Argentina
- Died: February 3, 2014 (aged 70); New Orleans, Louisiana
- Occupations: Dancer; Dance Historian; choreographer; instructor
- Spouse(s): Mirta Le Birge (divorced), Valorie Hart
- Children: Eugenia (Gina) Paz, Albert (Mike) Paz
- Parent(s): (mother) Blanca Elba Correa, (father) Alberto Gregorio Paz

Alberto Bernardino Paz (April 16, 1943 – February 3, 2014) was an Argentine tango historian, teacher, and dancer. Alberto taught the traditional, social tango of the Buenos Aires salons, together with its codes and culture, to North Americans and Europeans.

Argentine tango had a huge revival outside of Argentina beginning in 1983 with the success of tango stage productions, such as Tango Argentino, Forever Tango, and Tango x 2,. These popular stage productions encouraged many people to seek out tango dance lessons. In contrast to these stage productions, however; the social tango that Argentines dance in the salons (dance halls) is very different from the acrobatic dance that is often performed on stage. Alberto Paz was one of those Argentines. who taught Argentine tango as a social dance, introducing the dance style of the Buenos Aires tango salons to the world. Alberto and his wife and partner Valorie Hart through their writing and teaching had a strong impact on the growth of salon tango. The following quote from Alberto's tango magazine El Firulete is typical of his position:

The success of Forever Tango and Tango x 2, two critically acclaimed stage shows, has captured the imagination of many people and inspired others to consider tango dancing. Unfortunately, these shows and the ones tourists catch in Buenos Aires, do not have disclaimers that say, “warning, the performers on stage are professionals and they have trained for years to execute the breathtaking choreography you are watching. Please do not attempt to imitate, emulate or try these stunts at home.”

While the Broadway productions stimulated public interest in Argentine tango beginning in 1985, Alberto Paz was one those milongueros who, beginning in 1995, brought the culture, traditions and techniques of salon (social) tango to North America.

== Early years ==
Alberto was born in Argentina in the Northern province of Tucuman. He moved with his family to Buenos Aires at the age of 9 months. He grew up in Buenos Aires, and like every other boy in Argentina, his passion was soccer. He didn't dance tango in his youth. For him, tango was the background music in the community where he grew up:

For the 25 years I lived in Argentina, I totally ignored the tango I heard every day at home. I liked rock & roll."

In 1968, with an engineering degree from the School of Electrical Engineering of the University of Buenos Aires, Alberto found himself in California working for high-tech video companies. By the mid-1980s, he became a U.S. citizen. During the 1980s he also worked at San Francisco's radio station KIQI as a soccer announcer and color commentator.

The revival of the tango began in 1984 and quickly spread through Europe, North America and Japan with the unexpected success of the musical revue Tango Argentino. Producers Claudio Segovia and Héctor Orezzoli had captured the dramatic qualities of the tango on the stage. Like many others, Alberto became interested in learning to dance tango.

== 1990's Tango San Francisco ==
In 1990, Alberto ventured into a dance studio in San Francisco and took his first tango lessons from Mary Schonbeck. At the age of 47, he was a beginner at tango. Alberto learned tango the way most people do—first learning a few basic steps. He later returned to Buenos Aires and learned from the masters in the tango salons. When he "felt the tango for the first time," he was hooked.

Although he was a beginning dancer, Alberto was already very familiar with the music, having grown up with sounds of Argentine tangos permeating his home. Utilizing his skills as a radio announcer, Alberto produced "Tiempo Nuevo," a radio program totally devoted to the Argentine tango in the San Francisco Bay Area from 1990 – 1992 at radio station KIQI-1010.

Tango was a growing presence in the San Francisco Bay area. In 1991, Richard Powers, the head of dance instruction at Stanford University, began holding a very popular Stanford Tango Week. The Stanford Tango Weeks continued until 1997, and many attribute the beginnings of local tango clubs in the Bay area and around the country to this annual retreat, as retreat participants returned to their home communities and shared what they had learned.

In the early days of this tango revival, beginning dancers were attracted to the show tango that they had seen on stage (with fast, high kicks and acrobatic turns) as opposed to the less flamboyant social tango that is appropriate on a crowded dance floor. By Alberto's own account of the early Stanford Tango Weeks, the focus was on a fantasia (or show) style of tango:

In 1995 Richard Powers took a dramatic stand acknowledging the futility of insisting on tango fantasia workshops when the locals have been jamming the dance floors Chez Louis, Ruvano’s, BA tango Connection, etc. to dance tango socially.

=== 1995, The Year of the Milonguero ===
In 1995, Alberto met his wife and life partner in tango Valorie Hart at the Stanford Tango Week, and together they began a tango school that was committed to teaching the rich culture of social tango.

Stanford Tango Week 1995 also saw a big change: The festival committed itself to teaching the salon tango of Buenos Aires by bringing in a new set of instructors, Argentine milongueros who taught the traditional close embrace tango of the crowded Buenos Aires dance floors. This brought the "milonguero style" to the West Coast. See Alberto's account in "Sweet and Sour Tangos" El Firulete October, 2000.

[In 1995] the “Year of the Milonguero” was “declared” by the head of the dance department at Stanford University to herald the inclusion of real milongueros for the first time in its memorable Tango Weeks. A new generation of dancers was born during the trendy summer breezes of the Palo Alto campus in Northern California. It wouldn’t be far fetched to state that the face of Tango in North America forever changed. Although much of what the milongueros had to say at Stanford fell through the cracks of inept translations, the impact of their humble demeanor and their unassuming dancing captured the imagination of those who witnessed and lived the fortnight of Tango during the summer of 1995.

=== 1997 Mingo Pugliese ===
In 1997, Alberto and Valorie traveled to Buenos Aires for an extended period of study under the milonguero Mingo Pugliese. Mingo's wife Esther and their son Pablo had taught at the Stanford Tango Week workshops. Alberto and Valorie went to Buenos Aires to meet him and learn his style of tango. Mingo and Esther Pugliese taught a method of tango that stressed good posture, careful foot placement and extensive body communication. Central to the style are eight count left and right giros (turns). Mingo Pugliese explains those eight body positions were the key to improvisation in tango. He attributed the method and style to the great milonguero Petroleo.

Alberto and Valorie Paz adapted what they learned from the Puglieses to their own the tango school "Planet Tango." Together they traveled the world teaching tango, and started many communities still in existence. From the Hudson Valley, NY, to Tallahassee, FL, from San Francisco to Germany, tango communities can trace their origins to workshops with Alberto and Valorie.

Alberto felt very strongly that tango should be taught as a complete package of culture, music, and connection—not just steps and kicks. In order to help non-Spanish speaking students, he translated the lyrics of hundreds of tangos into English, providing a free database of lyrics for learners.

From 1996 until 2000, Alberto and Valorie served as the gateway into the Bay Area tango community for many visiting milongueros from Argentina, bringing many Argentines into their home and helping some find work opportunities in the United States. They helped as translators when needed. The list of house guests includes many well known milongueros--- Facundo and Kely Posadas, Orlando Paiva, Pablo and Beatriz Ojeda, Pablo Pugliese, Esther Pugliese, Jorge Nel, and many others. They hosted the one and only exhibition in the United States by Pupi Castello and Graciela Gonzalez. After their relocation to New Orleans in 2000 (below), they continued the tradition of hosting well known milongueros at home until 2005 when Hurricane Katrina hit.

== New Orleans 2000-2014 ==
In 1999, they taught in New Orleans. Their class was so popular, they were encouraged to move there to establish an Argentine Tango community in New Orleans. Planet Tango is still centered in New Orleans.

=== The Tango Belt ===
Tango in New Orleans has an interesting history. In 1914, there was a concentration of halls, cabarets, restaurants and cafés around the French Quarter called the Tango Belt. The Tango Belt was a result of the popularity of tango in Europe and North America at the time. There are documented instances of tango in the French Quarter into the 1920s and 1930s; Rudolph Valentino with his unique tango style visited the city several times.

=== La Milonga de New Orleans ===
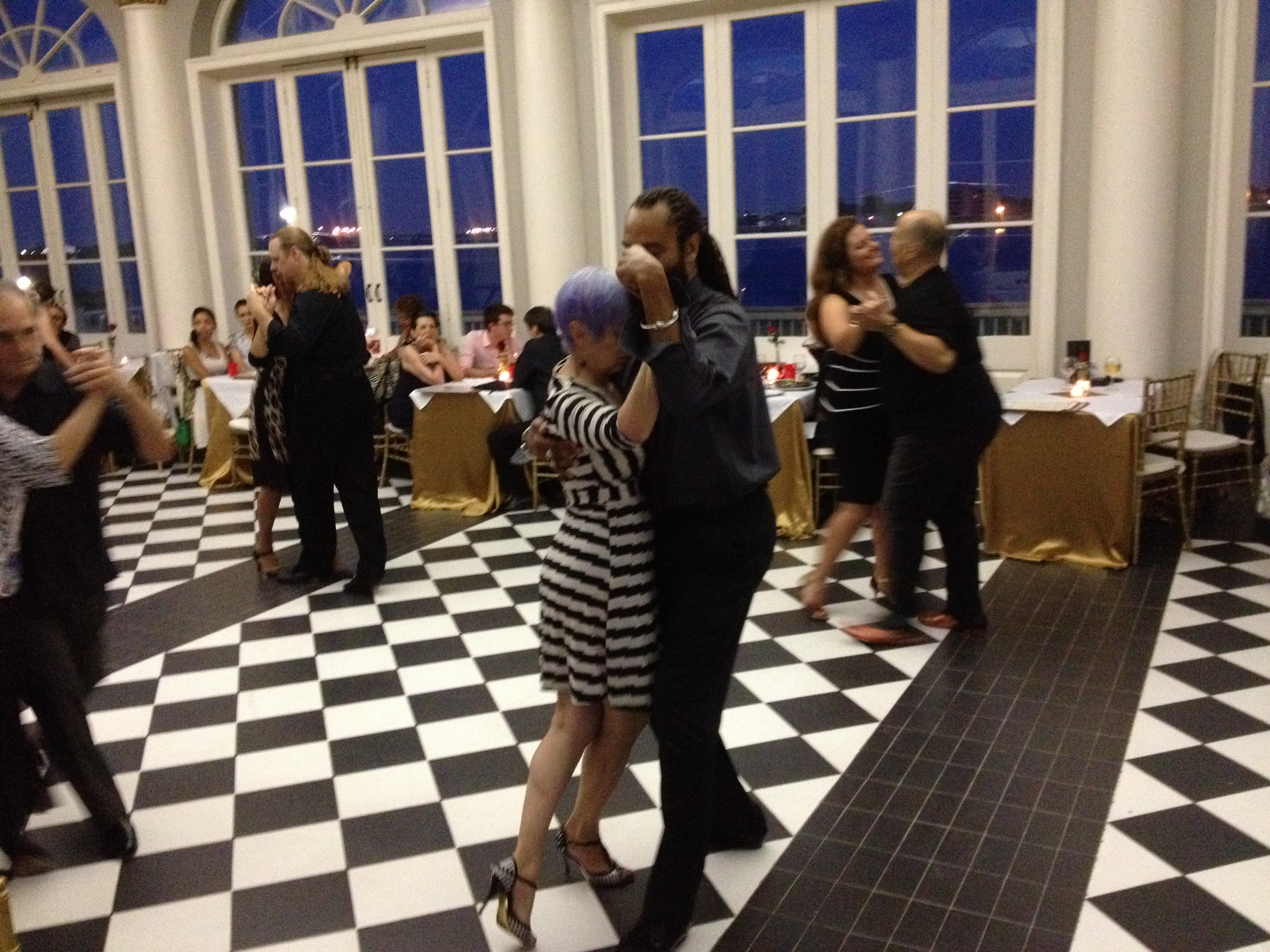
La Milonga de New Orleans

Alberto and Valorie helped revive Argentine tango in the French Quarter of New Orleans in the 21st Century. Besides teaching numerous classes and workshops, they hosted a popular milonga at Galvez Restaurant in the French Quarter known at La Milonga de New Orleans.

Among the many, many tango events and retreats they organized, Alberto and Valorie hosted the first New Orleans TangoFest in 2002, and continued to host the event until 2005.

=== Gotta Tango ===
In 2005, Christine Scheu of Tallahassee, Florida, wanted to learn to dance. Focusing on tango, she invited Alberto and Valerie to come to Tallahassee. This was the beginning of the Tallahassee Argentine Tango Society. Unfortunately, Hurricane Katrina hit in August 2005, while they were teaching in Tallahassee. Alberto and Valorie were stranded; they didn't know if they had a home to return to. The 5 day road trip to Tallahassee turned into a 4-month ordeal for Alberto and Valorie. Fortunately, they turned this tragedy into an opportunity to research a book on tango that they were in the process of writing.

They flew to Buenos Aires staying in the flat of a friend. They took the opportunity to research their new book at the National Archives of Argentina. This gave them the opportunity to access primary sources for their research, as well as access to materials that were not available outside of Argentina.

There Alberto came across Hugo Lamas and Enrique Binda's classic work El Tango en la Sociedad Porteña, 1880-1920 (Tango in the Buenos Aires Society, 1880 -1920). Lamas and Binda attacked the accepted myth that tango is simply a provocative, sexual dance from the bordellos of 19th Century Buenos Aires. They presented a new history of tango as a social movement originating in the lower and working classes of Argentina in response to the many dictatorships the country has experienced.

Building upon this well-documented study, Alberto and Valorie wrote their definitive work Gotta Tango.

=== 3rd Annual U.S.A. Salon Style Tango Championship ===
Upon returning to New Orleans, Alberto and Valorie continued sharing their tango around the world. In 2009, they won the 3rd Annual U.S.A. Salon Style Tango Championship. They followed that with the Mundial de Tango Salon (world salon tango competition) in Buenos Aires.

=== Death ===
Alberto died in 2014, while teaching a tango class. Valorie continues teaching tango and sharing Alberto's legacy.

== Works ==
=== Tiempo Nuevo ===
Tiempo Nuevo was a series of radio broadcasts totally devoted to the Argentine tango produced by Alberto Paz in the San Francisco Bay Area from 1990 – 1992 at radio station KIQI-1010. The broadcast recordings have been converted into podcasts and are archived online.

=== El Firulete ===
El Firulete was a tango magazine published from 1994 until 2014. Alberto started the magazine in 1994, then when he married Valorie Hart in 1995, they published the magazine as a team. It was published in hard copy from 1994 until 1999 and then as an eMagazine until 2014. The magazine is archived online.

=== Gotta Tango ===
Alberto's definitive work is the book Gotta Tango, which he co-authored with Valorie Hart. The book begins with the culture, history, and music of Buenos Aires that evolved into the Argentine tango dance. The instructional section of the book explains the fundamental concepts and techniques of dancing Argentine tango.
