= Tango Argentino (musical) =

Musical by Hector Orezzoli and Claudio Segovia

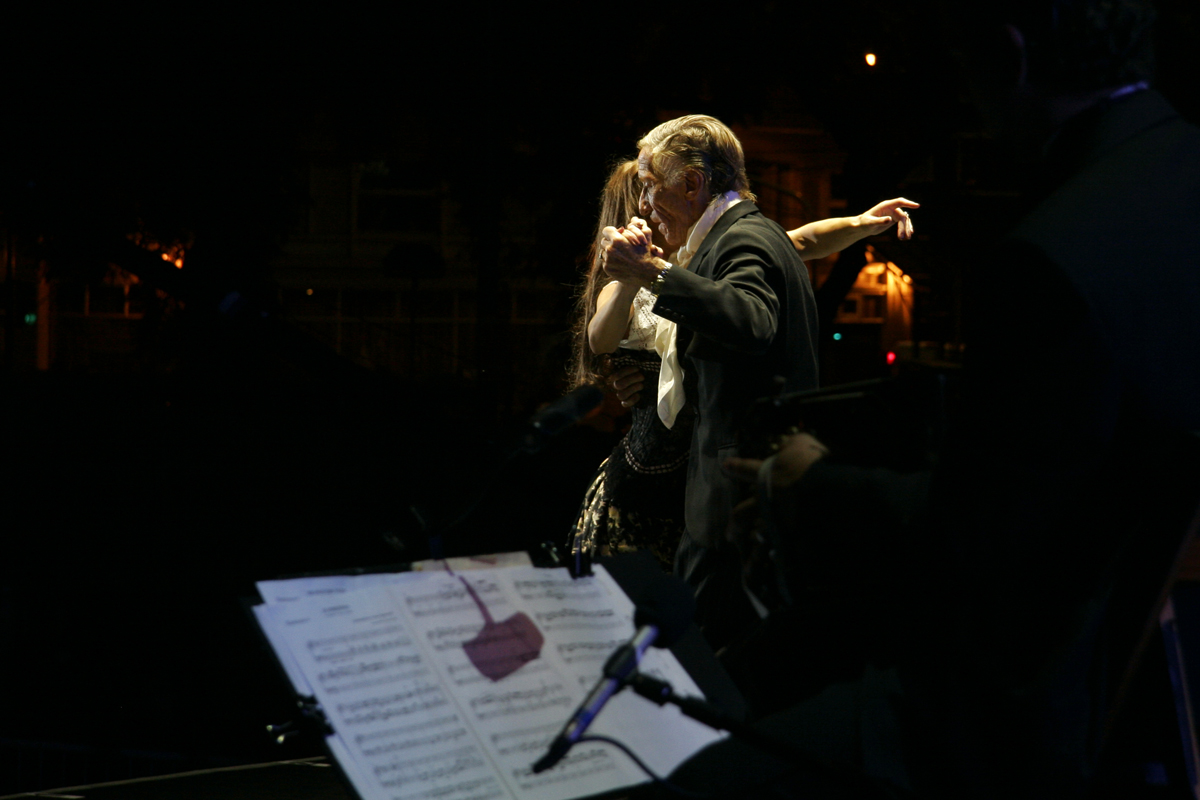
- Tango Argentino - Dani and Silvina Valz-Obelisco in 2011
- Premiere: 11 November 1983; 43 years ago: Théâtre du Châtelet, Paris, France
- Productions: 1983 Paris; 1984 Italy Tour; 1984 Paris; 1985 USA/Canada Tour; 1985–86 Broadway; 1986 North America Tour; 1987 Japan Tour; 1988 Europe Tour; 1989 Paris; 1991 London; 1992 Buenos Aires; 1992 Teatro Lola Membrives, Buenos Aires; 1999–2000 Broadway Revival; 2011 Obelisco, Buenos Aires
- Awards: Tony Award Nominations: -1986 Nominated Best Choreography; -1986 Nominated Best Direction of a Musical; -1986 Nominated Best Musical; -2000 Nominated Best Revival of a Musical

Tango Argentino is a musical stage production about the history and many varieties of Argentine tango. It was created and directed by Hector Orezzoli and Claudio Segovia, and premiered at the Festival d'Automne in Paris in 1983 and on Broadway in New York in 1985. The Mel Howard production became a world-wide success with numerous tours culminating with a Broadway revival in 1999–2000. It set off a world-wide resurgence of tango, both as a social dance and as a musical genre. Tango Argentino recreates on stage the history of tango from its beginnings in 19th-century Buenos Aires through the tango's golden age of the 1940s and 50s up to Piazzolla's tangos. Most of the dancers in the show did their own choreography.

Tango Argentino was a totally unexpected hit. It violated all the rules— It was low budget, used a single set, and showcased slim, athletic professional dancers, such as Nelson Avila, along with middle-aged dancers, such as Verulazo and Elvira Santamaría, all on the same stage. The average age of the cast was 42 years.

All this glamour attends a show that even Argentines wouldn't invest in at the outset, a show that made it to Broadway largely by accident, a show that has one set, four accordions (called bandoneons) and a couple of 38-inch waistlines. (Samuel G. Friedman, NY Times 1985)

== Background ==
In 1974, Hector Orezzoli and Claudio Segovia, two Argentine set designers, decided to put together a production about tango using the best dancers in all of Argentina. Claudio Segovia recounted that he wanted to reflect on stage the reality of tango life in Buenos Aires, therefore he looked for an authentic mixture of the different types of musicians and dancers, of children, young people and mature people: "Elegí gente que según mi juicio era la más auténtica, la más verdadera, y creo que no me equivoqué." [I chose people who, in my opinion, were the most authentic, the truest (tango artists), and I think I was not wrong.]

=== The solos ===
==== Juan Carlos Copes and Maria Nieves ====
Claudio Segovia went looking for accomplished tango dancers in Buenos Aires. He approached Juan Carlos Copes and Maria Nieves, who ran one of the most popular tango shows in the city.

By the mid-1970s, Copes and Nieves had been dancing tango together most of their lives. They had begun in a working class dance hall in 1940s Buenos Aires when they were in their teens. By the late 1950s, interest in tango had begun to wane due in part to a regressive government that discouraged public gatherings and later due to the cultural phenomenon of the Beatles. Copes had such a love for the dance, that he decided he would not accept the death of tango. Being a lover of Gene Kelly's dance films, he decided in 1955 to do something similar with tango. He began to rehearse tango choreographies, together with Maria Nieves and other tango dancers in the basement of a factory. Their shows soon became popular in Buenos Aires.

Copes expressed doubts that a group of tango artists, who were often known for their huge egos, could ever work together long enough to stage such a production. He thought the idea of the show was crazy. Eventually Copes and Nieves joined the cast of Tango Argentino.

==== Nelson Avila and Nélida Rodriguez ====
Segovia also approached the well-known stage dancers Nelson and Nélida. Nelson Avila and Nélida Rodriguez de Aure were dancing and directing the choreography at the famous Michelangelo tango show in San Telmo at the time. They had already been dancing together in the most prominent shows in Buenos Aires, had appeared together numerous times on television, and had performed internationally. They were noted for the speed of their dance and their acrobatic steps. Nelson and Nélida joined the cast.

==== Héctor and Elsa Maria Mayoral ====
The next couple added to the cast was Mayoral and Elsa Maria. They danced a different style than the others. They came from the tango salons and danced the very simple, yet very graceful dance of the crowded milonga salons of Buenos Aires. Their tango was noted for its small. playful steps. Together with Copes & Nieves and Nelson & Nélida, they comprised the three couples who were asked to perform solo routines in the original Tango Argentino.

==== Gloria and Luis Pereyra ====
1987 Luis Pereyra is added to the cast. He was solo dancer at Caño 14, Casa Blanca, Michelangelo, Viejo Almacén. He stayed at the cast over 13 years. First he dances with Gloria, later on with Norma. He had very much experience on stage. His dance education has taken place in the Theatre Colon, with the Ballett Salta, Master Santiago Ayala el Chúcaro. He started on stage at the age of ten. During all the years, Luis Pereyra danced different solos with his partners Gloria and Norma, such as: El Entrerriano. Verano Porteño he danced with Cecilia Narowa, who took the part of Milonguita.Together with Nelson Avila he was in charge to rebuild the choreografies

=== The Milongueros ===
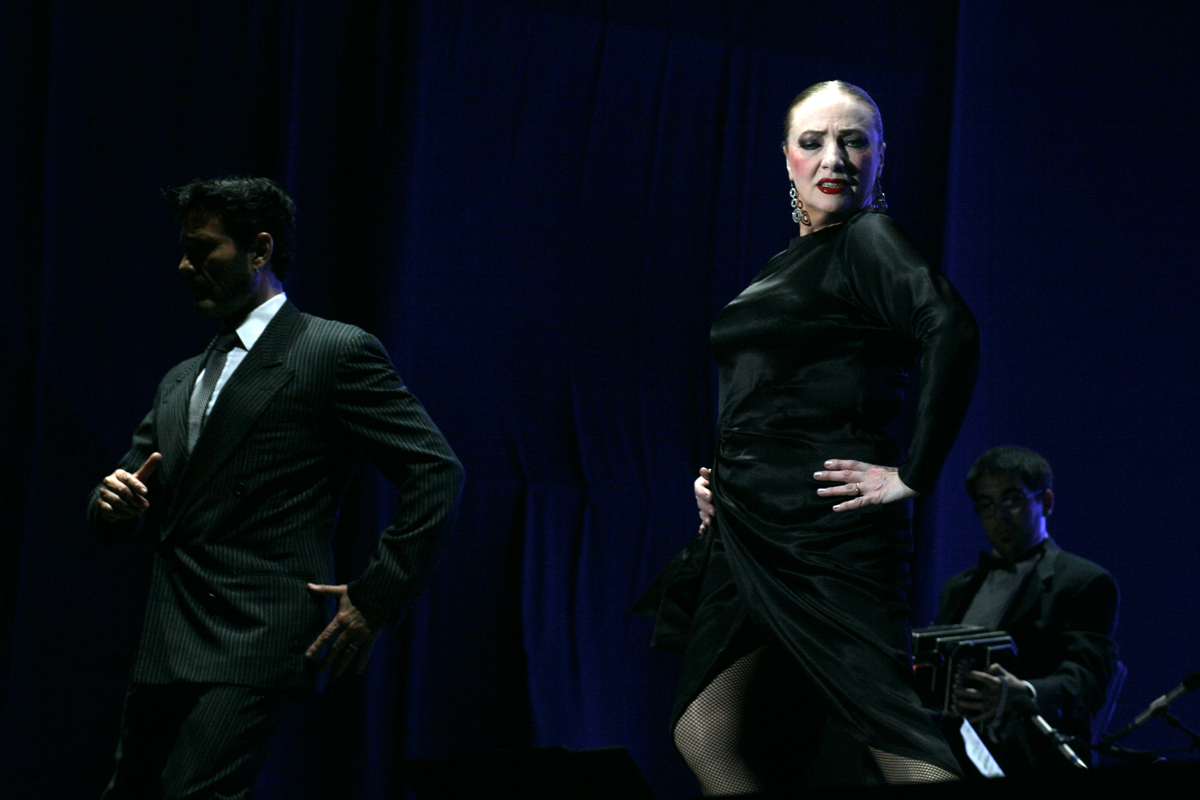
Carlos & Maria Rivarola performing in Tango Argentino at Obelisco, Buenos Aires 2011

==== Virulazo and Elvira Santamaría ====
With the solo routines set, Segovia needed more milongueros, the social dancers from the salons, to complete the show. Nelson Avila suggested some good friends, who were well respected street dancers in Buenos Aires, Virulazo and Elvira Santamaría. When Nelson and Nélida went to look for the couple, they found that Virulazo had quit tango, having become discouraged with the lack of money. Nelson went out searching for him in his old neighborhoods, but Verulazo was nowhere to be found. Anton Gazenbeek describes what happened next in his book Inside Tango Argentino. When Nelson finally found Virulazo, he was working in a butcher shop with a blood-covered apron and he was noticeably overweight. Nelson described the new tango show to him, but Verulazo had no interest at all. He was done with tango. When they mentioned an audition for the show, Verulazo replied that he didn't need to audition for anyone: People already knew he was a great dancer, he had no interest in auditioning. When Nelson finally talked Virulazo and Elvira into dancing for Segovia, any doubts about their tango disappeared. They were quickly added to the cast.

==== María and Carlos Rivarola and the balance of the cast ====
The well known salon tango dancers Carlos and María Rivarola were added to the cast, Mónica and Luciano Frías, and Cecilia Narova completed the original cast of dancers.

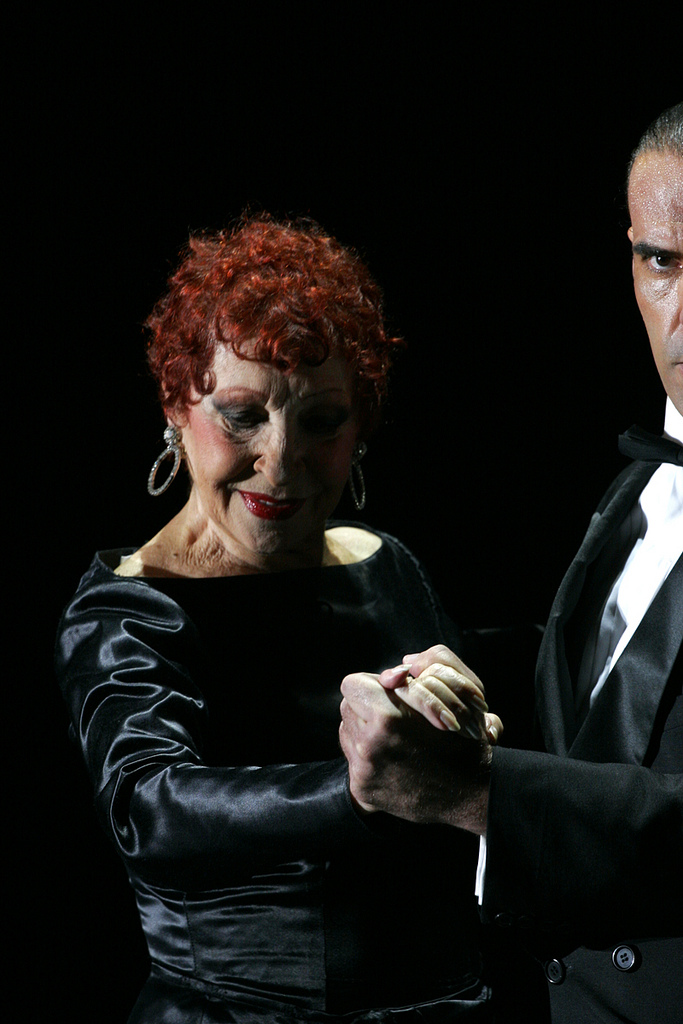
Maria Nieves dancing at Tango Argentino, presented in the Obelisco, Buenos Aires, 2011

=== The music ===
==== The instrumentals ====
Music for Tango Argentino was provided by Sexteto Mayor. The sextet in Argentine tango was first established by Julio De Caro in 1924. The traditional tango sextet consists of piano, double bass, two violins and two bandoneóns. Sexteto Mayor had been formed in 1973 by bandoneon players and arrangers Jose Libertella and Luiz Stazo. By 1981, they were playing in Paris and Segovia approached Libertella and Stazo with his idea. Sexteto Mayor provided the music for both the Paris performance and the first Broadway performance. Together they put together a musical arrangement that followed the origins of Argentine tango from its beginnings in the 19th century to the nuevo tango of Piazzolla.

Originally, Segovia had hoped to use the orchestra of the great Aníbal Troilo; however, Troilo had died in 1975. In homage to Troilo, every performance of Tango Argentino begins and ends with "Quejas de bandoneón", which was Troilo's signature piece.

In addition to Sexteto Mayor, Segovia recruited the great Horacio Salgán to complete the music.

==== The vocalists ====
In his book Tango: The Art History of Love, Robert Farris Thompson describes tango as music, poetry and dance. The poetry of tango is expressed through its songs. To complete the tango experience for the audience, Segovia included vocal performances by some of the best tango singers in Argentina. Jovita Luna and Raúl Lavié performed in the original cast from Paris to Broadway. Roberto Goyeneche sang at the world premier in Paris. Elba Berón sang at the 1985 Broadway premier.

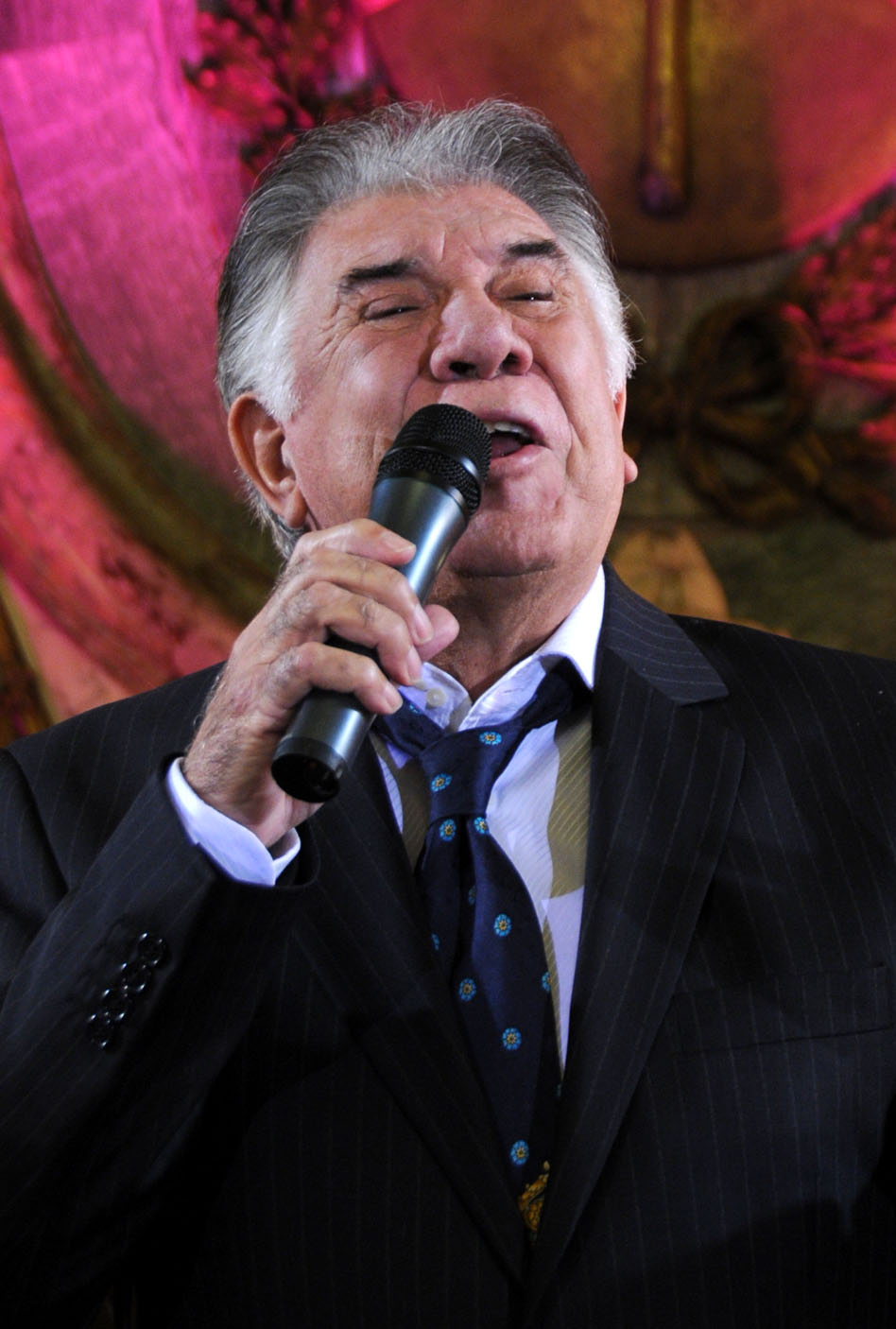
Touring internationally in 1985 with Tango Argentino, Raúl Lavié's voice was in great demand among Tango fans in Argentina and elsewhere.

=== Choreography and production ===
The concept of Tango Argentino was to present the history of tango through its music, song and dance. With the many dance styles among the cast members, each couple was given the flexibility to do much of their own choreography. One problem was that there are no videos of the early 20th century dancers. When trying to choreograph the beginnings of tango dance, Segovia and the dancers took original still photographs from the early days of tango and laid them out in such an order as to allow them to recreate the original dance of the time. Thus audiences were able to visualize the evolution of Argentine tango as both music and dance.

Despite all the work, the show found little support in Buenos Aires. They even had difficulty finding places to rehearse. Few Argentines thought the show had any chance of success.

== Paris ==
In 1983, they finally got a break. They were invited to perform in Paris. On a minimal budget, the entire cast of Tango Argentino boarded an Argentine military transport headed to Paris. The Argentine Air Force cargo plane provided no services; they flew as cargo. They had been afforded the opportunity to participate in the Festival d'Automne. The show was an immediate success. The first performance in Paris received so many loud standing ovations, that Nelson Avila and Nélida stood at the front of the stage and wept after their solo performance, further exciting the crowd. The show sold out for every performance with crowds standing outside the theatre unable to get tickets. The show was in such demand that it made a second tour of Italy and Paris the next year.

== Broadway ==
By 1985, Tango Argentino appeared on Broadway. Unfortunately, Nelson Avila, one of the main performers, broke his arm before the first performance, and it was in a full cast. Nelson had the doctors break the cast in two and hinged it at the elbow so he could bend his arm a little, and he danced the show with a broken arm. Also appearing were Jorge Martin Orcaizaguirre [Virulazo] and Elvira Santa Maria, Juan Carlos Copes and Maria Nieves. Tango Argentino received rave reviews from the New York critics. The show was such an immediate success that many celebrities attended the show, including Frank Sinatra, Madonna, Brooke Astor, Mikhail Baryshnikov, Helen Gurley Brown, Henry Kissinger and Claus von Bulow. Régine Zylberberg of Regine's invited the cast to dinner. Dance instructors in New York saw the demand for Argentine tango instruction triple overnight.

The diversity of the dancers and the simple elegance of tango struck home with audiences who had no concept of Argentine tango before seeing the show. Russell St. Cyr, writing for The Miscellany News, the Vassar College newspaper, suggested that the production be considered for a Tony Award and was impressed with the quality of the production:

The dancers have each developed different styles, and they have brought the tango's entire rainbow to the same stage. One would never think that a simple dance could have so much diversity.

Tango Argentino did not receive any Tony Awards, although it received numerous Tony Award nominations: The nominations included the 1986 Tony Award for the Best Choreography; the 1986 Tony Award for the Best Direction of a Musical; the 1986 Tony Award for the Best Musical and for the revival in 1999 the 2000 Tony Award for the Best Revival.

== World Tour ==
Tango Argentino became a world-wide hit, touring the United States, then Japan (1987). On numerous tours around the world, the cast of Tango Argentno danced before the likes of Princess Diana, Jacqueline Kennedy, Ann Miller, Rita Moreno, Mikhail Baryshnikov, Rudolph Nureyev, Burt Reynolds, Kirk Douglas, Dustin Hoffman, Robert De Niro, Liza Minnelli, Katharine Hepburn, and Placido Domingo. It continued to tour the world for another 15 years with many of its original cast members. The final Broadway revival occurred in 1999–2000. In 2011 there was a performance at the Obelisco in Buenos Aires with a few of the original artists including Maria Nieves and Raúl Lavié

== Impact ==
When the dancers of Tango Argentino took the stage on 11 November 1983, at the Festival d'Automne in Paris, France, many consider it a turning point in the history of tango. The world of Argentine tango would never be the same. Robert Farris Thompson in the preface to his book Tango: The Art History of Love states "In the 1980s Buenos Aires barrio dancers sparked the strongest renaissance of the twentieth century, through their performance in the stage extravaganza Tango Argentino."

The tango historian Alberto Paz credits Tango Argentino with the world-wide revival of Argentine tango:

Tango Argentino appeared for the first time on an international stage at the Paris Autumn Festival, which began on November 11, 1983. That run lasted one week, but those few days were enough to change history: the tango as dance resurfaced with an unexpected force, and became huge around the world. There has never been a time in history when so many social dancers are dancing Argentine tango as it was danced in the golden years of the 1940s and '50s.

In the epilogue of his book Inside Tango Argentino, Antón Gazenbeek observes that the lure of the production was its "humanity:" The average age of the dancers in the original Tango Argentino was 42 years. When the audience watched a large male dancer, such as Verulazo, dance the tango, their reaction was, "I can do that." They were pulled into the show. The immediate impact of Tango Argentino was observable wherever it appeared. Shortly after the 1985 Broadway premier, Samuel G. Friedman wrote in the New York Times:

From dance schools to fashion shows to the media, Tango Argentino has stirred the metropolitan imagination. Vanity Fair magazine discoursed on tango history. Women's Wear Daily devoted a centerfold to tango togs. The New Yorker published a Tango Argentino cartoon. Tango mania, quoth Vogue.

We're all tango daft, said Sandra Cameron, who owns a dance school in Greenwich Village. Courses in Beginning Tango, Advanced Tango and Tango Milonga are now populated by 124 students – three times the pre-Tango Argentino enrollment.

More recently, video footage of Copes and Nieves dancing in Tango Argentino flows in and out of German Kral's 2016 documentary Our Last Tango as the two dancers reflect on the passion and turmoil of their relationship and their 50 year partnership in tango.

While many see the musical Tango Argentino as the catalyst for the world-wide revival of Argentine tango in the 1990s, an alternative theory of the cause of this revival can be found in a study by Chris Goertzen and María Susana Azzi titled "Globalization and the Tango" in the 1999 Yearbook for Traditional Music. The authors describe the globalization of tango using an example of the Washington, DC, musical ensemble Quintango: The well-known group Quintango played in Washington, DC, at a White House gala reception for then Argentine President Carlos Menem, and then two weeks later played in Richmond, Indiana (population 40,000) at small Earlham College. The authors observe how a small town, such as Richmond, had an active Argentine tango dance group and how the audience at Quintango's performance was totally familiar with the all forms of tango music. They attribute this globalization of traditional tango music to mass media and the many tango movies of the 1980s and 1990s. Goertzen and Azzi make no mention of the musical Tango Argentino in their analysis, rather they refer to a long gradual assimilation of tango into European and North American culture in the early 20th century. They then describe the growth of tango in the tourist areas of San Telmo, Buenos Aires. The authors present the thesis that this global spread of the culture of Argentine tango reaching as far as small towns in Indiana is the result of the global effects of mass media.

== 1985 Broadway Playbill ==
The playbill of the 1985 Broadway production shows the following performances:

1985 Broadway Playbill Tango Argentino
PART I
QUEJAS DE BANDONEÓN (J. de Dios Filiberto)	Orchestra
EL APACHE ARGENTINO (M. Aróztegui-A. Mathón); Two things entwine and dance the tango	Ballet
EL ESQUINAZO (A. Villoldo); Couples of "outsiders" dance the "milonga".	Ballet
MILONGA DEL TIEMPO HEROICO (F. Canaro)	Juan Carlos Copes and María Nieves
LA PUÑALADA (P. Castellanos-E.C. Flores)	Osvaldo Berlingeri and Orchestra
LA MOROCHA (E. Saborido-A. Villoldo); Two young girls dance the tango "discreetly".	Gloria and María Rivarola
EL CHOCLO (A. Villoldo-E.S. Discépolo)"With this tango the tango was born and, weeping, fled the mud, searching for the sky..."	Elba Berón
LA CUMPARSITA (G.M. Rodríguez); European Dance Hall	María and Carlos Rivarola
MI NOCHE TRISTE (E. Castriota-P. Contursi) "For me there is no consolation, and that's why I get drunk, to forget our love".	Raúl Lavié
ORGULLO CRIOLLO (J. DeCaro, P. Laurenz)	Virulazo and Elvira; Choreography: Virulazo
DE MI BARRIO (R. Goyeneche)	Jovita Luna
BANDONEONES	José Libertella, Luis Stazo, Lisandro Adrover, Oscar Rubén González
MILONGUITA The story of a young girl of the barrio, who, seduced by a ruffian, follows the road to her ruin * MILONGUITA (E. Delfino-S. Linning) * DIVINA (J. Mora-J. de la Calle) * MELENITA DE ORO(E. Delfino-S. Linning) * RE-FA-SI (E. Delfino)	Naanim Timoyko (Milonguita); Juan Carlos Copes (The ruffian) Nélida (The ruffian's accomplice) Nelson (The bridegroom) Eduardo, Mayoral, Carlos Rivarola (The cabaret's customers) Gloria, Elsa María, Gloria Dinzel, María Rivarola (Prostitutes)
NOSTALGIAS (J.C. Cobián-E. Cadicamo)"Bandoneón, groan your gray tango, perhaps you also suffer from love...".	Sexteto Mayor
CUESTA ABAJO (Gardel-Le Pera)"I carry my shame everywhere shame to have been and pain of being no more.".	Raúl Lavié
EL ENTRERRIANO (R. Mendizábal)	The Dinzels; Choreography: R. Dinzel
CANARO EN PARÍS (Scarpino-Caldarella)	Osvaldo Berlingieri and Orchestra
TAQUITO MILITAR (M. Mores)	Juan Carlos Copes, María Nieves, Nélida and Nelson, Gloria and Eduardo
Intermission
PART II
MILONGUEANDO EN EL 40 (Armando Pontier)	Gloria and Eduardo; Choreography: Eduardo
UNO (E.S. Discépolo-M. Mores)"One is so alone with her pain, one is so blind in her sorrow".	Alba Solís
LA ÚLTIMA CURDA (A. Troilo-C. Castillo) "Life is an absurd wound".	Alba Solís
LA YUMBA (O. Pugliese)	Mayoral and Elsa María; Choreography: Mayoral
NUNCA TUVO NOVIO (E. Cadícamo-A. Bardi) "Poor and alone, you are without illusion, without faith...".	Raúl Lavié, Osvaldo Berlingieri y Orchestra
JEALOUSEY[sic] (J. Gade)	Nélida and Nelson; Choreography: Nélida and Nelson
DESENCUENTRO (A. Troilo-C. Castillo)"Your luck is so bad that when you want to put the last bullet in your pistol into your head--- it won't fire".	Elba Berón
TANGUERA (M. Mores)	Orchestra
VERANO PORTEÑO (A. Piazzolla)	Juan Carlos Copes and María Nieves
BALADA PARA MI MUERTE (A. Piazzolla-H. Ferrer); I'll toss the cloak of dawn around my shoulders, my next to last whiskey will age in its glass, my death, in love, will arrive on a tango step, and I will die precisely at six o'clock!	Jovita Luna
ADIÓS NONINO (A. Piazzolla)	Sexteto Mayor
DANZARÍN (J. Plaza); QUEJAS DE BANDONEÓN (J. de Dios Filiberto); The dance floor fills with the sound of the orchestra, and under the spotlights, the marionettes dance.	Ballet

== Some Notable Casts ==
11 November 1983 World Premier Festival d'Automne Théâtre du Châtelet (Paris)		10 September 1985 - 30 March 1986 Broadway Premier Mark Hellinger Theatre Broadway, New York City		16 November 1999 – 1 September 2000 Broadway Revival Gershwin Theatre Broadway, New York City	
Jovita Luna	Singer	Jovita Luna	Singer	Jovita Luna	Singer
Raúl Lavié	Singer	Raúl Lavié	Singer	Raúl Lavié	Singer
Nelson Avila	Dancer	Nelson Avila	Dancer	Nelson Avila	Dancer
Nélida Rodriguez de Aure	Dancer	Nélida Rodriguez de Aure	Dancer	Nélida Rodriguez de Aure	Dancer
Juan Carlos Copes	Dancer	Juan Carlos Copes	Dancer	Juan Carlos Copes	Guest Artist
María Nieves	Dancer	María Nieves	Dancer	María Nieves	Guest Artist
"Virulazo" Jorge Martín Orcaizaguirre	Dancer	"Virulazo" Jorge Martín Orcaizaguirre	Dancer	"Virulazo" Jorge Martín Orcaizaguirre	Dancer
Elvira Santamaría	Dancer	Elvira Santamaría	Dancer	Elvira Santamaría	Dancer
Elsa María Mayoral	Dancer	Elsa María Mayoral	Dancer	Elsa María Mayoral	Dancer
Héctor Mayoral	Dancer	Héctor Mayoral	Dancer	Héctor Mayoral	Dancer
Carlos Rivarola	Dancer	Carlos Rivarola	Dancer	María Graña	Singer
María Rivarola	Dancer	María Rivarola	Dancer	Pablo Verón	Guest Artist
Luciano Frías	Dancer	Eduardo Arquimbau	Dancer	Carlos Bórquez	Dancer
Monica Pelay	Dancer	Gloria Arquimbau	Dancer	Roberto Herrera	Dancer
Cecilia Narova	Dancer	Alba Solís	Singer	Inés Bórquez	Dancer
Tita Merello	Dancer	Naanim Timoyko	Soloist	Alicia Monti	Dancer
Roberto Goyeneche	Singer	Elba Berón	Singer	Carlos Copello	Dancer
Sexteto Mayor	Musicians	Rodolfo Dinzel	Dancer	Antonio Cervila, Jr.	Dancer
		Gloria Dinzel	Dancer	Johana Copes	Dancer
				Luis Pereyra	Dancer
				Norma Pereyra	Dancer
				Guillermina Quiroga	Dancer
				Alba Solís	Singer
				Lorena Yácono	Dancer
				Vanina Bilous	Dancer
