= Raúl Lavié =

Argentinian entertainer and singer

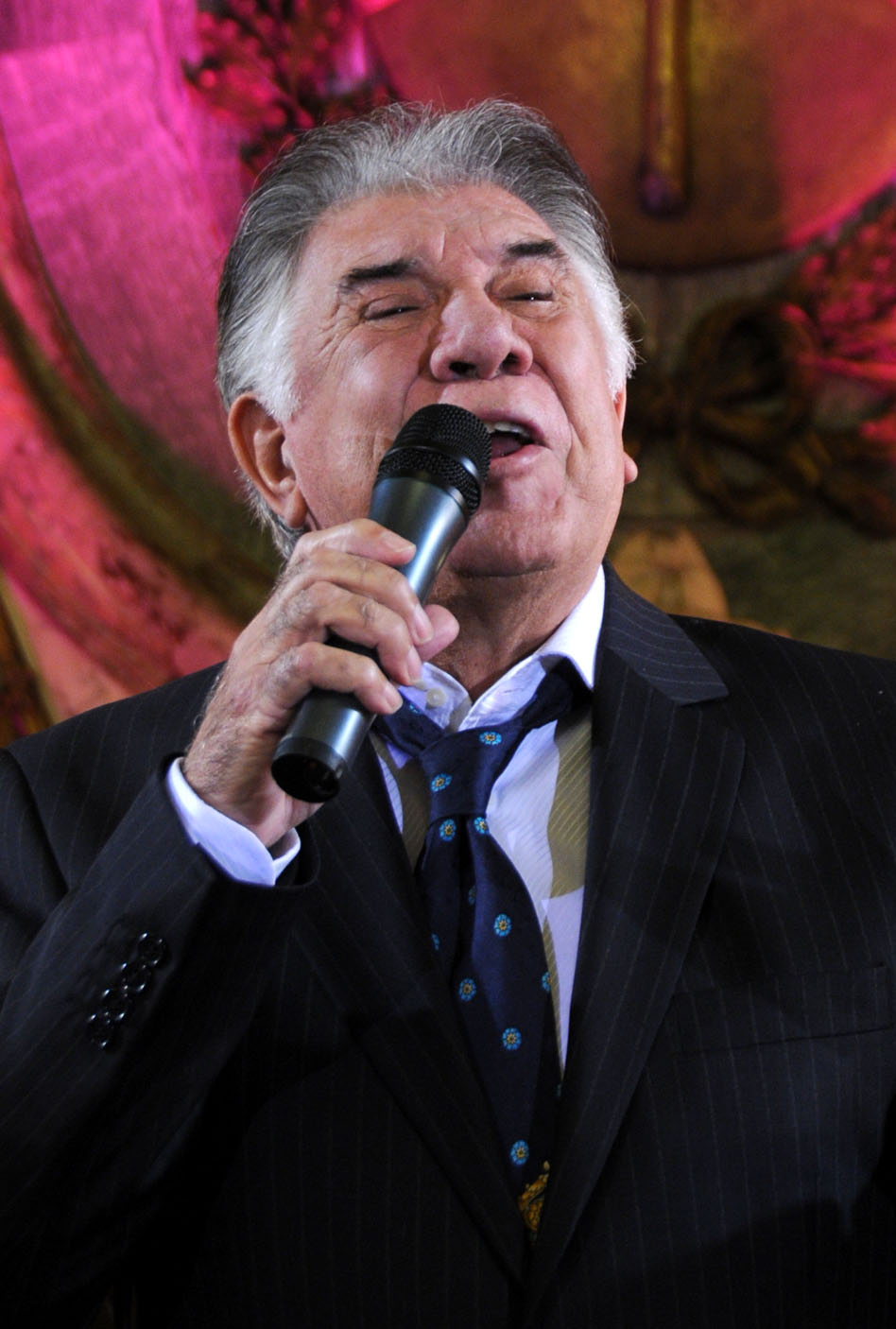
- Raúl Lavié

Background information
- Born: August 22, 1937 (age 89); Rosario, Argentina
- Origin: Argentina
- Genre: Tango
- Occupations: Singer, actor

Raúl Lavié (born August 22, 1937) nickname El Negro, is an Argentine entertainer prominent in the Tango genre.

== Life and work ==
Raúl Alberto Peralta was born in Álvarez, located in the Rosario Department of the Santa Fe Province, Argentina in 1937. He first sang on a local radio station in 1955 and was subsequently invited to perform on Radio Belgrano and Radio El Mundo in Buenos Aires. Enjoying early popular acclaim, he gained his first professional contract with Columbia Records in July 1957, by which he recorded with Tango orchestra leader Héctor Varela. Touring the country with fellow vocalist Rodolfo Lessica, he was, by then, known to his public as Raúl Lavié.

Recording for Phillips with orchestra leader Héctor Stamponi in 1959, the following year Radio Libertad launched the Raúl Lavié Show, his first as a host. Introducing a succession of young musicians to listeners, in 1962 these contacts helped earn him a spot in a new, teen-oriented musical comedy series, El Club del Clan. Playing a self-confident social animal, Lavié's vocal talents came through in his Spanish-language interpretation of Paul Anka standards, among others'. Days before the first episode, in September of that year, Lavié was granted an interview by news anchor Lidia Elsa Satragno. Recently separated from his first wife, Lavié courted the television host, who was already a household word in Argentina by her nickname, "Pinky." The couple married in 1965 and had two sons.

Widely popular during its 1963 season, El Club del Clan was produced for the cinema in 1964. The show, however, quickly lost favor among its fickle teen audience and it was canceled later that year. Partial to the melancholy Tango, Lavié returned to the genre, recording with Osvaldo Fresedo and Horacio Salgán, among others. Lavié was soon cast in a number of theatre roles, debuting on the stage at the National Comedy Theatre in Gregorio de Laferrère's Locos de verano (Summer Madness). His performance earned him an invitation to Mexico City, where he was cast in the title role in a local production of Man of La Mancha in 1968. His 1964 film role also opened doors for Lavié in cinema and he starred in 17 films in subsequent years, notably Lautaro Murúa's Un guapo del 900 (The Cad) in 1971 and Leopoldo Torre Nilsson's Boquitas pintadas (Painted faces) in 1974. His marriage with Pinky became strained, resulting in their separation in 1974, and he subsequently married his current wife, Laura Basualdo. Continuing to perform in the theatre, as well as a tango vocalist and film actor, he accepted the leading roles in Bob Fosse's Pippin and in Nikos Kazantzakis' Zorba the Greek.

Touring internationally in 1985 with Claudio Segovia and Héctor Orezzoli's Tango Argentino, Lavié's voice remained in great demand among Tango fans in Argentina and elsewhere. He joined Tango dancer Juan Carlos Copes and the cast of Manuel González Gil's De Borges a Piazzolla on their international tour in 1997 and returned to Broadway with Tango Argentino in 1999. He represented Argentina in the OTI Festival 1997 with the song "Sin tu mitad". He returned as Don Quixote in a Buenos Aires revival of Man of La Mancha in 2005, for which he received the Golden Ace, a prestigious Argentine award in the world of theatre. A versatile actor, he accepted the role of "Toddy" (a homosexual man) in a 2007 Argentine production of Victor/Victoria.
