= Jovita Luna =

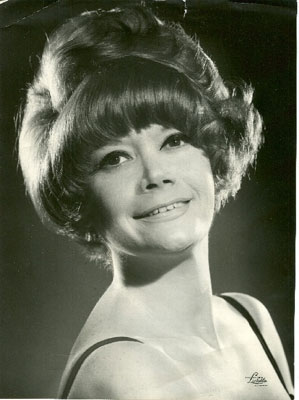

Background information
- Birth name: María Eugenia Luna
- Born: June 11, 1924
- Origin: Argentine
- Died: 12 January 2006 (aged 81)
- Occupation(s): singer, dancer

María Eugenia Luna (11 June 1924 – 12 January 2006), also known as Jovita Luna, was an Argentine singer and actress.

== Biography ==
She was born in Buenos Aires, and started her career in the popular group Marilyn in 1932, beside Nelly Prince and Alba Solís. Afterwards, she started in the theatre heading with Beba Bidart and Nélida Roca. In 1941, through the EPT company, she played a Palomita integrating the duet "The Palomitas" in the drama Joven, viuda y estanciera, under the direction of Luis José Bayón Herrera and the lead of Mecha Ortiz. The plot indicated that Elena (Ortiz) goes to return to his house and confronts León (Santiago Arrieta) and the person to charge of the ranch (Santiago Gómez Cou) with a struggle for winning her love.

In 1951, she starred in musical pictures that included El patio de la morocha, a film based on a tango of Mariano Mores and Cátulo Castillo, who also wrote the screenplay. In this decade, she acted in France, Italy and Brazil, performing tangos and participating in music-hall performances. Also, she developed a big theatrical career, in works like Two hearts (1944) at the Theatre President Alvear, The history of farce (1946) with Malvina Pastorino, The Other I of Marcela (1962) in the El National theatre, Lights of Buenos Aires (1969), of Hugo of the Lane, Promises, promises (1972), in the Theatre Odeon, The true history of Salomé (1972), in the Teatro General San Martín, The neighbours of Corrientes(1974), a musical revue starring the Argentine female impersonator Jorge Perez Evelyn and the comedian Pablo Palitos, Chicago (1977), where she played Mum Morton in at the El National, with Àmbar the Fox, Nélida Lobato and Juan Carlos Thorry, Violated and abandoned (1981), in the Theatre Maipo, Annie (1982), in the Theatre Buenos Aires, among others.

In 1962 she played a Dancer in Different, favoured by Àguila Films. In 1971 she was hired to sing in Argentinísima, a cinematographic version of the program issued by Chronic TV with Julio Mahárbiz, the one who to his time commissioned to present the film. With a cast of Atahualpa Yupanqui, Mercedes Sosa, Eduardo Falú, Astor Piazzolla and Norma Viale, under the musical direction of Oscar Cardozo Ocampo, this would be the last cinematographic work of Luna. In 1985, she fulfilled more important television work in Coraje Mamá Prowess mum), playing the role of Catalina at the side of María Aurelia Bisutti, and in 1986, she collaborated with the world-wide show Tango Argentinia, that toured several countries including the United States. In 1993, she toured seven years, in France beside the Greater Sextet, the Duet Salgán-Of Lio, and voices like the ones of Roberto Goyeneche, María Graña, accompanied by the choreography of Juan Carlos Copes. Afterwards, she continued in Italy, and later returned to Paris.

With little fanfare, Jovita Moon withdrew from artistic activity. She died in Buenos Aires, aged 81, on 12 January 2006. She was buried in the Panteón of the Argentine Association of Actors of the cemetery of the Chacarita.

== Filmography ==
- Argentinísima (1972)
- Different (1962)
- The hand that tightens (1953)
- The playground of the morocha (1951)
- Youngster, widowed and estanciera (1941)
