= Nelson Avila (dancer) =

Argentinian choreographer

Nelson Ávila
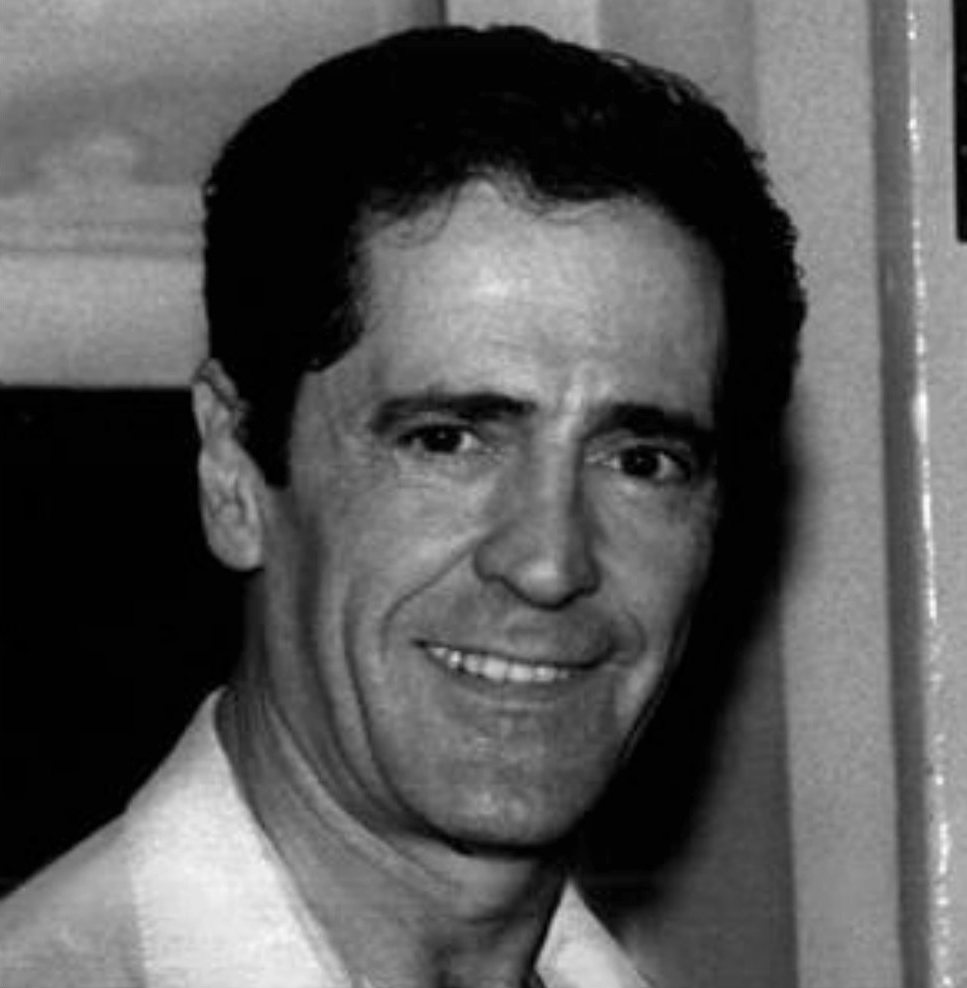
- Born: Héctor Nelso Ávila; August 7, 1940; Chivilcoy, Argentina
- Occupations: Dancer; choreographer; instructor
- Spouse: Madalyn Klein

Nelson Avila (born Héctor Nelso Ávila; August 7, 1940) is an Argentine born dancer, choreographer, and instructor. He is widely recognized for his expertise and knowledge of all types of Argentine dance, including Argentine folk dances and Argentine tango. He was part of the original cast of Tango Argentino, and together with his partner Nélida, was one of only three couples to perform solo in the original production. Tango Argentino is viewed by many as the catalyst that began the 1985 revival of Argentine tango in Europe, North America and then spread throughout the world. As an original member of the cast, Nelson Avila was an integral part of that Tango Argentino revival. He has always been noted for his quick feet and athletic ability on the dance stage. Nelson is a member of Academia Nacional del Tango de la República Argentina and is recognized as an authority of tango dance, history, music, musicians and its many styles and interpretations.

== Early years and dance partners ==
=== Argentine Folk Dance ===
Nelson was born in Chivilcoy, Argentina, a city 153 kilometers west of Buenos Aires. He began dancing Argentine folk dance at the age of nine. At eighteen, he began his professional career in Buenos Aires. Nelson is an accomplished expert in all varieties of Argentine folk dance. His quick feet and his acrobatic ability have allowed him to master any dance.

=== Nelson and Nélida ===
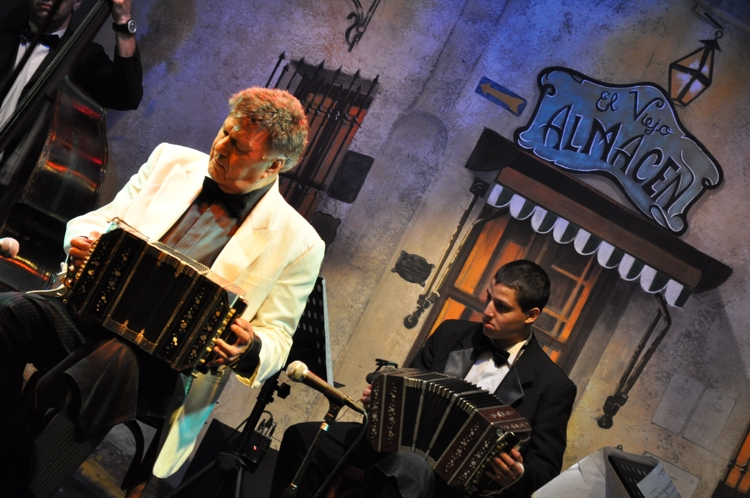
Inside Tango House El Viejo Almacén - Buenos Aires

In 1971, he met Nélida Rodriguez de Aure, who was trained in classical dance. They had been asked to demonstrate different types of Argentine dance on a television program. It was their first time dancing together, but they danced so well that they formed a partnership. They danced at all the major tango houses in Buenos Aires, including El Viejo Almacén, where Nelson was a master choreographer, producer and star in many tango shows. The partnership lasted over 30 years, including their major role in "Tango Argentino."

=== Nelson and Madalyn ===
Since 2004, Nelson has teamed with his wife, Madalyn Klein. An accomplished dancer trained in many forms of dance, Madalyn has performed with the National Dance Institute under the direction of Jacques d’Amboise, the Arcady Festival in Maine and at the Waldorf Astoria's Gala Viennese Opera Ball. Nelson and Madalyn are very active teaching workshops around the world.

== Broadway and Stage ==
=== Original Cast: Tango Argentino ===
==== Orezzoli and Segovia ====
In 1974, Hector Orezzoli and Claudio Segovia, two Argentine set designers, decided to put together a production about tango using the best dancers in all of Argentina. Claudio Segovia recounted that he wanted to reflect on the stage the reality of tango life in Buenos Aires, therefore he looked for an authentic mixture of the different types of musicians and dancers, of children, young people and mature people: "Elegí gente que según mi juicio era la más auténtica, la más verdadera, y creo que no me equivoqué." I chose people who, in my opinion, were the most authentic, the truest (tango artists), and I think I was not wrong.

Nelson and Nélida were dancing and directing the choreography at the famous Michelangelo tango show in San Telmo at the time. They had already been dancing together in the most prominent shows in Buenos Aires, had appeared together numerous times on television, and had performed internationally. They were noted for the speed of their dance and their acrobatic steps. They were among the first, who were asked to join the original cast, and were one of only three couples to dance a solo routine in the performance.

==== Paris 1983 ====
Unfortunately, the show found little support in Buenos Aires. They even had difficulty finding places to rehearse. Then in 1983, they got a break. Nelson, Nélida and the rest of the cast of Tango Argentino boarded an Argentine military transport headed to Paris. The Argentine Air Force cargo plane provided no services; they flew as cargo. They had been afforded the opportunity to participate in the Festival d'Automne. The show was an immediate success. The first performance in Paris received so many loud standing ovations, that Nelson and Nélida stood at the front of the stage and wept after their solo performance, further exciting the crowd. The show made a second tour of Italy and Paris the next year.

==== Broadway 1985 ====
By 1985, Tango Argentino appeared on Broadway. Unfortunately, Nelson broke his arm before the first performance, and it was in a full cast. Nelson had the doctors break the cast in two and hinged it at the elbow so he could bend his arm a little, and he danced the show with a broken arm. Also appearing were Jorge Martin Orcaizaguirre [Virulazo] and Elvira Santa Maria, Juan Carlos Copes and Maria Nieves.

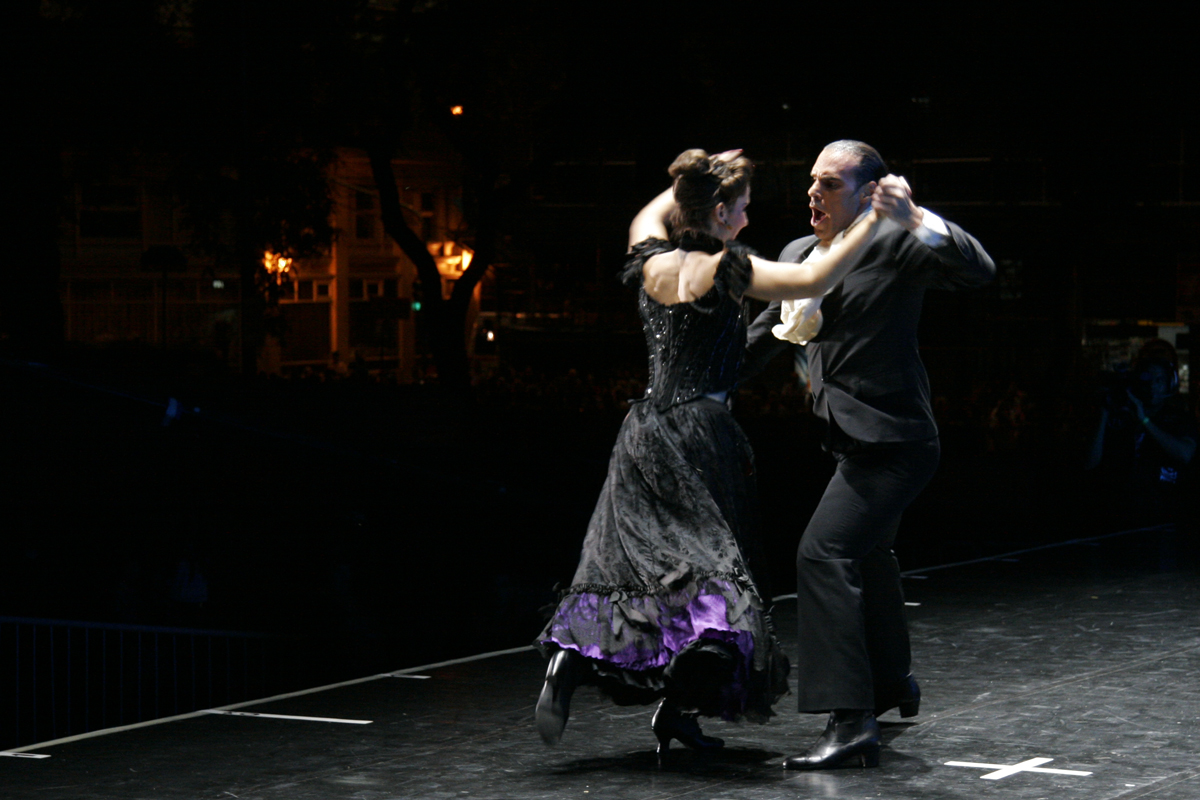
"Tango Argentino" Buenos Aires Performance 2011 (Foto: Estrella Herrera)

Tango Argentino received rave reviews from the New York critics. Celebrities took in the show, including Frank Sinatra, Madonna, Brooke Astor, Mikhail Baryshnikov, Helen Gurley Brown, Henry Kissinger and Claus von Bulow. Régine Zylberberg of Regine's invited the cast to dinner. Dance instructors in New York saw the demand for Argentine tango instruction triple overnight.

Tango Argentino became a world-wide hit, touring the United States, then Japan (1987). On tour, Nelson and Nélida danced their solo before the likes of Princess Diana, Jacqueline Kennedy, Ann Miller, Rita Moreno, Mikhail Baryshnikov, Rudolph Nureyev, Burt Reynolds, Kirk Douglas, Dustin Hoffman, Robert De Niro, Liza Minnelli, Katharine Hepburn, and Placido Domingo.

Tango Argentino continued its world-wide tours until 2000, with Nelson and Nélida, appearing in all of them.

=== Forever Tango 2004 ===
Tango Argentino was followed by Luis Bravo's Forever Tango in 1997, which ran for 14 months and earned a Tony nomination for Best Choreography. In 2004, Nelson appeared in Luis Bravo's Forever Tango, dancing with Zita González in its production on Broadway, Chicago, Rome, Toronto, Philadelphia and Detroit.

== Films ==
=== Tango Bar ===
Nelson and Nélida appeared in the 1987 movie The Tango Bar. The movie starred Raul Julia as a Tango show owner, who returns to Buenos Aires to join his partners after the oppressive government of Argentina has dissolved.

=== Los Chicos Crecen ===
In 1974, Nelson and Nélida performed in the Argentine movie "Los Chicos Crecen" (The boys grow up). This movie, directed by the prolific Enrique Carreras, is based on a 1941 theatrical comedy by Camilo Darthés and Carlos S. Damel. It premiered on May 13, 1976. In this comedy, a man passes a friend off as the father of three boys he had with his lover.

== Choreographer and Instructor ==
Nelson is a highly recognized tango instructor and has trained many professionals, actors and dancers including Robert Duvall Rita Moreno, Sharon Stone, Linda Cristal, the Russian dancer Vasilev, and Anthony Quinn. Nelson and Madalyn have taught and performed at numerous tango shows, festivals and workshops around the world, including the New York City Tango Festival.

== Awards, honors and tributes ==
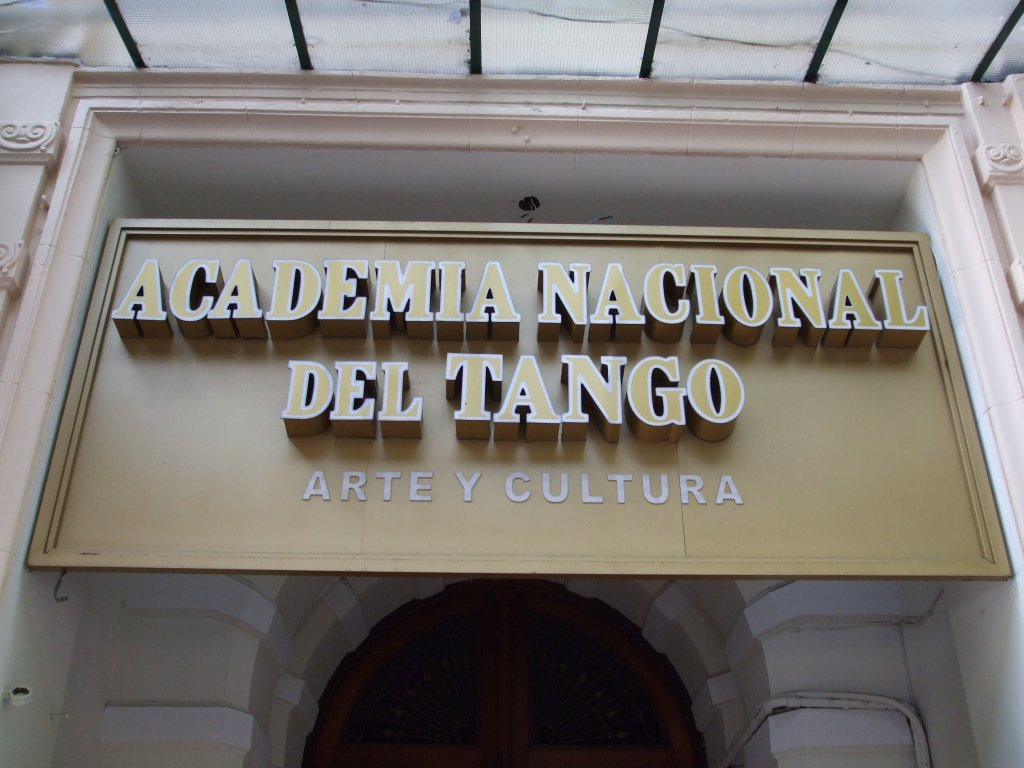
Academia Nacional del Tango, Av. de Mayo, Buenos Aires

- 1990 Honorary member of Academia Nacional del Tango de la República Argentina presented by the Minister of Culture and Education in Argentina
- 1995: Academia Nacional del Tango de la República Argentina honor presented to Nélida Y Nelson 6/19/1995
- 1998: Noche De Milonguero Homeaje a NELIDA Y NELSON Honors from Club Sin Rumbo 3/3/1998
- 1999: Noche De Milonguero Homeaje a NELIDA Y NELSON Honors from Club Amalgro 5/20/1999
- 2012: Outstanding Life Achievement Award presented at the Las Vegas Red Carpet Tango Festival 10/2012
