= Tango (1998 film) =

1998 film by Carlos Saura

- Theatrical release poster
- Directed by: Carlos Saura
- Screenplay by: Carlos Saura
- Produced by: Carlos Mentasti; Luis A. Scalella
- Starring: Miguel Ángel Solá; Mía Maestro; Juan Luis Galiardo
- Cinematography: Vittorio Storaro
- Edited by: Julia Juaniz
- Music by: Lalo Schifrin
- Production companies: Adela Pictures; Alma Ata International Pictures; Argentina Sono Film; Astrolabio Producciones
- Distributed by: Líder Films (Argentina); Warner Bros. (Spain)
- Release dates: 6 August 1998 (Argentina); 25 September 1998 (Spain)
- Running time: 115 minutes
- Countries: Argentina; Spain
- Language: Spanish
- Budget: US$4.6 million
- Box office: US$1.6 million (US)

Tango (Spanish: Tango, no me dejes nunca, translation: Tango, never leave me) is a 1998 Argentine-Spanish musical drama film written and directed by Carlos Saura and starring Miguel Ángel Solá and Mía Maestro. It was photographed by cinematographer Vittorio Storaro.

== Plot ==
In Buenos Aires, Mario Suárez, a middle-aged theatre director, finds himself holed up in his apartment, licking his wounds when his girlfriend (and principal dancer) Laura leaves him. Seeking distraction, he throws himself into his next project, a musical about the tango. One evening, while meeting with his backers, he is introduced to a beautiful young woman, Elena, who is the girlfriend of his chief investor Angelo, a shady businessman with underworld connections.

Angelo asks Mario to audition Elena. He does so and is immediately captivated by her. Eventually, he takes her out of the chorus and gives her a leading role. An affair develops between them, but the possessive Angelo has her followed and threatens her with dire consequences if she leaves him, mirroring Mario's own feelings and actions towards Laura before Elena entered his life.

The investors are unhappy with some of Mario's dance sequences. They don't like a routine that criticizes the violent military repression and torture of the past. Angelo has been given a small part, which he takes very seriously. The lines between fact and fiction begin to blur: during a scene in the musical showing immigrants newly arrived in Argentina, two men fight over the character played by Elena. She is stabbed. Only slowly do we realize that her death is not real.

== Cast ==
- Miguel Ángel Solá as Mario Suárez
- Mía Maestro as Elena Flores
- Cecilia Narova as Laura Fuentes
- Juan Luis Galiardo as Angelo Larroca
- Juan Carlos Copes as Carlos Nebbia
- Carlos Rivarola as Ernesto Landi
- Sandra Ballesteros as María Elman
- Óscar Cardozo Ocampo as Daniel Stein
- Enrique Pinti as Sergio Lieman
- Julio Bocca as Julio Bocca
- Martín Seefeld as Andrés Castro

== Production ==
Tango was shown out of competition at the 1998 Cannes Film Festival.

== Reception ==
On the review aggregator website Rotten Tomatoes, 68% of 22 critics' reviews are positive, with an average rating of 6.7/10. The website's consensus reads: "Tango makes a few false moves, but this dance-driven fantasy steps just the right side of the line between stultifying and seductive."

== Accolades ==
Wins

- 1998 - Goya Award for Best Sound.
- 1998 - Grand Prix Technique de la CST (Vittorio Storaro) at the 1998 Cannes Film Festival.
- 1998 - San Diego Film Critics Society Awards for Best Foreign Language Film
- 1998 - CEC Awards for Best Cinematography (Vittorio Storaro)
- 1998 - CEC Awards for Best Music (Lalo Schifrin)

Nominations

- 1998 - Academy Award Best Foreign Language Film by the Academy of Motion Picture Arts and Sciences.
- 1998 - Golden Globe Award for Best Foreign Language Film.

== Home media ==
Tango was issued on DVD by Sony Pictures in August 1999, in Spanish with English subtitles.

== See also ==
- List of submissions to the 71st Academy Awards for Best Foreign Language Film
- List of Argentine submissions for the Academy Award for Best Foreign Language Film
