= Nelson Ávila =

Nelson Ávila may refer to:

- Nelson Ávila (politician)
- Nelson Avila (dancer)
