= Tony Award for Best Direction of a Musical =

American theatre award

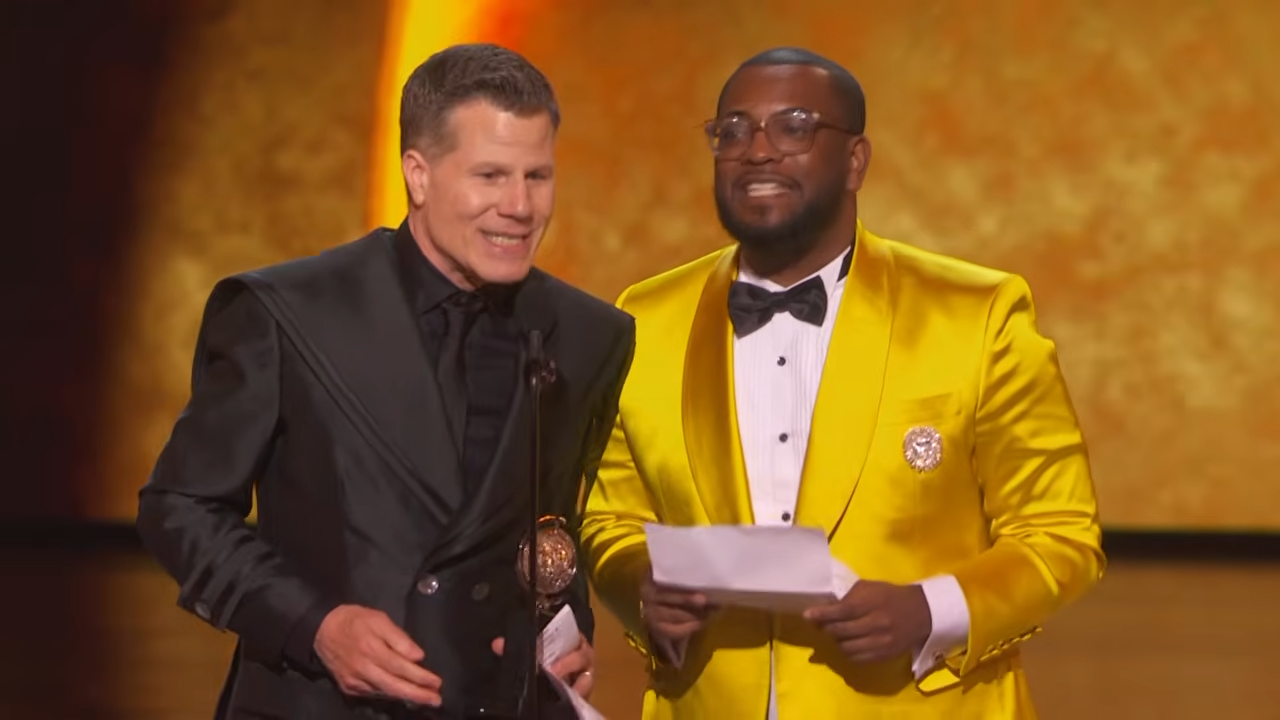
- 2026 Recipients: Zhailon Levingston and Bill Rauch
- Awarded for: Best Direction of a Musical
- Location: New York City
- Presented by: American Theatre Wing The Broadway League
- Currently held by: Zhailon Levingston and Bill Rauch for Cats: The Jellicle Ball (2026)
- Website: TonyAwards.com

The Tony Award for Best Direction of a Musical has been given since 1960. Before 1960 there was only one award for both play direction and musical direction, then in 1960 the award was split into two categories: Dramatic and Musical.

== Winners and nominees ==
=== 1950s ===
Year	Production	Director
1950
1950	South Pacific	Joshua Logan
1951
1951	Guys and Dolls	George S. Kaufman
1958
1958	My Fair Lady	Moss Hart

=== 1960s ===
Year	Production	Director
1960 (14th)
1960 (14th)	Fiorello!	George Abbott
1960 (14th)	Destry Rides Again	Michael Kidd
1960 (14th)	Gypsy	Jerome Robbins
1960 (14th)	The Sound of Music	Vincent J. Donehue
1960 (14th)	Take Me Along	Peter Glenville
1961 (15th)
1961 (15th)	Bye Bye Birdie	Gower Champion
1961 (15th)	Do Re Mi	Garson Kanin
1961 (15th)	Irma La Douce	Peter Brook
1962 (16th)
1962 (16th)	How to Succeed in Business Without Really Trying	Abe Burrows
1962 (16th)	All American	Joshua Logan
1962 (16th)	Carnival!	Gower Champion
1962 (16th)	No Strings	Joe Layton
1963 (17th)
1963 (17th)	A Funny Thing Happened on the Way to the Forum	George Abbott
1963 (17th)	Brigadoon	John Fearnley
1963 (17th)	Little Me	Cy Feuer and Bob Fosse
1963 (17th)	Oliver!	Peter Coe
1964 (18th)
1964 (18th)	Hello, Dolly!	Gower Champion
1964 (18th)	110 in the Shade	Joseph Anthony
1964 (18th)	High Spirits	Noël Coward
1964 (18th)	She Loves Me	Harold Prince
1965 (19th)
1965 (19th)	Fiddler on the Roof	Jerome Robbins
1965 (19th)	Half a Sixpence	Gene Saks
1965 (19th)	Oh, What a Lovely War!	Joan Littlewood
1965 (19th)	The Roar of the Greasepaint – The Smell of the Crowd	Anthony Newley
1966 (20th)
1966 (20th)	Man of La Mancha	Albert Marre
1966 (20th)	Mame	Gene Saks
1966 (20th)	Skyscraper	Cy Feuer
1966 (20th)	Sweet Charity	Bob Fosse
1967 (21st)
1967 (21st)	Cabaret	Harold Prince
1967 (21st)	Annie Get Your Gun	Jack Sydow
1967 (21st)	The Apple Tree	Mike Nichols
1967 (21st)	I Do! I Do!	Gower Champion
1968 (22nd)
1968 (22nd)	The Happy Time	Gower Champion
1968 (22nd)	Hallelujah, Baby!	Burt Shevelove
1968 (22nd)	How Now, Dow Jones	George Abbott
1968 (22nd)	Illya Darling	Jules Dassin
1969 (23rd)
1969 (23rd)	1776	Peter Hunt
1969 (23rd)	Hair	Tom O'Horgan
1969 (23rd)	Promises, Promises	Robert Moore
1969 (23rd)	Zorba	Harold Prince

=== 1970s ===
Year	Production	Director
1970 (24th)
1970 (24th)	Applause	Ron Field
1970 (24th)	Coco	Michael Benthall
1970 (24th)	Purlie	Philip Rose
1971 (25th)
1971 (25th)	Company	Harold Prince
1971 (25th)	The Me Nobody Knows	Robert H. Livingston
1971 (25th)	No, No, Nanette	Burt Shevelove
1971 (25th)	The Rothschilds	Michael Kidd
1972 (26th)
1972 (26th)	Follies	Harold Prince and Michael Bennett
1972 (26th)	Ain't Supposed to Die a Natural Death	Gilbert Moses
1972 (26th)	A Funny Thing Happened on the Way to the Forum	Burt Shevelove
1972 (26th)	Two Gentlemen of Verona	Mel Shapiro
1973 (27th)
1973 (27th)	Pippin	Bob Fosse
1973 (27th)	Don't Bother Me, I Can't Cope	Vinnette Carroll
1973 (27th)	A Little Night Music	Harold Prince
1973 (27th)	Sugar	Gower Champion
1974 (28th)
1974 (28th)	Candide	Harold Prince
1974 (28th)	Over Here!	Tom Moore
1974 (28th)	Raisin	Donald McKayle
1974 (28th)	Seesaw	Michael Bennett
1975 (29th)
1975 (29th)	The Wiz	Geoffrey Holder
1975 (29th)	Gypsy	Arthur Laurents
1975 (29th)	Mack & Mabel	Gower Champion
1975 (29th)	The Magic Show	Grover Dale
1976 (30th)
1976 (30th)	A Chorus Line	Michael Bennett
1976 (30th)	Chicago	Bob Fosse
1976 (30th)	Pacific Overtures	Harold Prince
1976 (30th)	Very Good Eddie	Bill Gile
1977 (31st)
1977 (31st)	I Love My Wife	Gene Saks
1977 (31st)	Annie	Martin Charnin
1977 (31st)	Porgy and Bess	Jack O'Brien
1977 (31st)	Your Arms Too Short to Box with God	Vinnette Carroll
1978 (32nd)
1978 (32nd)	Ain't Misbehavin'	Richard Maltby Jr.
1978 (32nd)	Dancin'	Bob Fosse
1978 (32nd)	On the Twentieth Century	Harold Prince
1978 (32nd)	Runaways	Elizabeth Swados
1979 (33rd)
1979 (33rd)	Sweeney Todd: The Demon Barber of Fleet Street	Harold Prince
1979 (33rd)	Ballroom	Michael Bennett
1979 (33rd)	The Best Little Whorehouse in Texas	Peter Masterson and Tommy Tune
1979 (33rd)	They're Playing Our Song	Robert Moore

=== 1980s ===
Year	Production	Director
1980 (34th)
1980 (34th)	Evita	Harold Prince
1980 (34th)	Barnum	Joe Layton
1980 (34th)	A Day in Hollywood / A Night in the Ukraine	Tommy Tune
1980 (34th)	Sugar Babies	Ernie Flatt and Rudy Tronto
1981 (35th)
1981 (35th)	The Pirates of Penzance	Wilford Leach
1981 (35th)	42nd Street	Gower Champion
1981 (35th)	Sophisticated Ladies	Michael Smuin
1981 (35th)	Woman of the Year	Robert Moore
1982 (36th)
1982 (36th)	Nine	Tommy Tune
1982 (36th)	Dreamgirls	Michael Bennett
1982 (36th)	The First	Martin Charnin
1982 (36th)	Joseph and the Amazing Technicolor Dreamcoat	Tony Tanner
1983 (37th)
1983 (37th)	Cats	Trevor Nunn
1983 (37th)	Merlin	Ivan Reitman
1983 (37th)	My One and Only	Tommy Tune and Thommie Walsh
1983 (37th)	Show Boat	Michael Kahn
1984 (38th)
1984 (38th)	La Cage aux Folles	Arthur Laurents
1984 (38th)	Baby	Richard Maltby Jr.
1984 (38th)	Sunday in the Park with George	James Lapine
1984 (38th)	The Tap Dance Kid	Vivian Matalon
1985 (39th)
1985 (39th)	Big River	Des McAnuff
1985 (39th)	Grind	Harold Prince
1985 (39th)	The King and I	Mitch Leigh
1985 (39th)	Quilters	Barbara Damashek
1986 (40th)
1986 (40th)	The Mystery of Edwin Drood	Wilford Leach
1986 (40th)	Big Deal	Bob Fosse
1986 (40th)	Song and Dance	Richard Maltby Jr.
1986 (40th)	Tango Argentino	Héctor Orezzoli and Claudio Segovia
1987 (41st)
1987 (41st)	Les Misérables	John Caird and Trevor Nunn
1987 (41st)	Me and My Girl	Mike Ockrent
1987 (41st)	The Mikado	Brian Macdonald
1987 (41st)	Starlight Express	Trevor Nunn
1988 (42nd)
1988 (42nd)	The Phantom of the Opera	Harold Prince
1988 (42nd)	Anything Goes	Jerry Zaks
1988 (42nd)	Into the Woods	James Lapine
1988 (42nd)	Sarafina!	Mbongeni Ngema
1989 (43rd)
1989 (43rd)	Jerome Robbins' Broadway	Jerome Robbins
1989 (43rd)	Black and Blue	Héctor Orezzoli and Claudio Segovia
1989 (43rd)	Starmites	Larry Carpenter
1989 (43rd)	Welcome to the Club	Peter Mark Schifter

=== 1990s ===
Year	Production	Director
1990 (44th)
1990 (44th)	Grand Hotel	Tommy Tune
1990 (44th)	Aspects of Love	Trevor Nunn
1990 (44th)	City of Angels	Michael Blakemore
1990 (44th)	Sweeney Todd: The Demon Barber of Fleet Street	Susan H. Schulman
1991 (45th)
1991 (45th)	The Will Rogers Follies	Tommy Tune
1991 (45th)	Miss Saigon	Nicholas Hytner
1991 (45th)	Once on This Island	Graciela Daniele
1991 (45th)	Those Were the Days	Eleanor Reissa
1992 (46th)
1992 (46th)	Guys and Dolls	Jerry Zaks
1992 (46th)	Crazy for You	Mike Ockrent
1992 (46th)	Falsettos	James Lapine
1992 (46th)	Jelly's Last Jam	George C. Wolfe
1993 (47th)
1993 (47th)	The Who's Tommy	Des McAnuff
1993 (47th)	Blood Brothers	Bill Kenwright and Bob Tomson
1993 (47th)	The Goodbye Girl	Michael Kidd
1993 (47th)	Kiss of the Spider Woman	Harold Prince
1994 (48th)
1994 (48th)	Carousel	Nicholas Hytner
1994 (48th)	Beauty and the Beast	Robert Jess Roth
1994 (48th)	Passion	James Lapine
1994 (48th)	She Loves Me	Scott Ellis
1995 (49th)
1995 (49th)	Show Boat	Harold Prince
1995 (49th)	How to Succeed in Business Without Really Trying	Des McAnuff
1995 (49th)	Sunset Boulevard	Trevor Nunn
1995 (49th)	Smokey Joe's Cafe	Jerry Zaks
1996 (50th)
1996 (50th)	Bring in 'da Noise, Bring in 'da Funk	George C. Wolfe
1996 (50th)	A Funny Thing Happened on the Way to the Forum	Jerry Zaks
1996 (50th)	The King and I	Christopher Renshaw
1996 (50th)	Rent	Michael Greif
1997 (51st)
1997 (51st)	Chicago	Walter Bobbie
1997 (51st)	Juan Darién	Julie Taymor
1997 (51st)	The Life	Michael Blakemore
1997 (51st)	Steel Pier	Scott Ellis
1998 (52nd)
1998 (52nd)	The Lion King	Julie Taymor
1998 (52nd)	Cabaret	Rob Marshall and Sam Mendes
1998 (52nd)	Ragtime	Frank Galati
1998 (52nd)	1776	Scott Ellis
1999 (53rd)
1999 (53rd)	Swan Lake	Matthew Bourne
1999 (53rd)	Fosse	Richard Maltby Jr. and Ann Reinking
1999 (53rd)	Parade	Harold Prince
1999 (53rd)	You're a Good Man, Charlie Brown	Michael Mayer

=== 2000s ===
Year	Production	Director
2000 (54th)
2000 (54th)	Kiss Me, Kate	Michael Blakemore
2000 (54th)	Contact	Susan Stroman
2000 (54th)	The Music Man	Susan Stroman
2000 (54th)	Swing!	Lynne Taylor-Corbett
2001 (55th)
2001 (55th)	The Producers	Susan Stroman
2001 (55th)	42nd Street	Mark Bramble
2001 (55th)	The Full Monty	Jack O'Brien
2001 (55th)	The Rocky Horror Show	Christopher Ashley
2002 (56th)
2002 (56th)	Urinetown	John Rando
2002 (56th)	Into the Woods	James Lapine
2002 (56th)	Oklahoma!	Trevor Nunn
2002 (56th)	Thoroughly Modern Millie	Michael Mayer
2003 (57th)
2003 (57th)	Hairspray	Jack O'Brien
2003 (57th)	La bohème	Baz Luhrmann
2003 (57th)	Movin' Out	Twyla Tharp
2003 (57th)	Nine	David Leveaux
2004 (58th)
2004 (58th)	Assassins	Joe Mantello
2004 (58th)	Avenue Q	Jason Moore
2004 (58th)	Caroline, or Change	George C. Wolfe
2004 (58th)	Wonderful Town	Kathleen Marshall
2005 (59th)
2005 (59th)	Monty Python's Spamalot	Mike Nichols
2005 (59th)	Dirty Rotten Scoundrels	Jack O'Brien
2005 (59th)	The Light in the Piazza	Bartlett Sher
2005 (59th)	The 25th Annual Putnam County Spelling Bee	James Lapine
2006 (60th)
2006 (60th)	Sweeney Todd: The Demon Barber of Fleet Street	John Doyle
2006 (60th)	The Drowsy Chaperone	Casey Nicholaw
2006 (60th)	Jersey Boys	Des McAnuff
2006 (60th)	The Pajama Game	Kathleen Marshall
2007 (61st)
2007 (61st)	Spring Awakening	Michael Mayer
2007 (61st)	Company	John Doyle
2007 (61st)	Curtains	Scott Ellis
2007 (61st)	Grey Gardens	Michael Greif
2008 (62nd)
2008 (62nd)	Rogers & Hammerstein's South Pacific	Bartlett Sher
2008 (62nd)	Gypsy	Arthur Laurents
2008 (62nd)	In the Heights	Thomas Kail
2008 (62nd)	Sunday in the Park with George	Sam Buntrock
2009 (63rd)
2009 (63rd)	Billy Elliot the Musical	Stephen Daldry
2009 (63rd)	Hair	Diane Paulus
2009 (63rd)	Next to Normal	Michael Greif
2009 (63rd)	Rock of Ages	Kristin Hanggi

=== 2010s ===
Year	Production	Director
2010 (64th)
2010 (64th)	La Cage aux Folles	Terry Johnson
2010 (64th)	Fela!	Bill T. Jones
2010 (64th)	Memphis	Christopher Ashley
2010 (64th)	Ragtime	Marcia Milgrom Dodge
2011 (65th)
2011 (65th)	The Book of Mormon	Casey Nicholaw and Trey Parker
2011 (65th)	Anything Goes	Kathleen Marshall
2011 (65th)	How to Succeed in Business Without Really Trying	Rob Ashford
2011 (65th)	The Scottsboro Boys	Susan Stroman
2012 (66th)
2012 (66th)	Once	John Tiffany
2012 (66th)	Newsies	Jeff Calhoun
2012 (66th)	Nice Work If You Can Get It	Kathleen Marshall
2012 (66th)	Porgy and Bess	Diane Paulus
2013 (67th)
2013 (67th)	Pippin	Diane Paulus
2013 (67th)	Kinky Boots	Jerry Mitchell
2013 (67th)	Matilda the Musical	Matthew Warchus
2013 (67th)	The Mystery of Edwin Drood	Scott Ellis
2014 (68th)
2014 (68th)	A Gentleman's Guide to Love and Murder	Darko Tresnjak
2014 (68th)	After Midnight	Warren Carlyle
2014 (68th)	Hedwig and the Angry Inch	Michael Mayer
2014 (68th)	Violet	Leigh Silverman
2015 (69th)
2015 (69th)	Fun Home	Sam Gold
2015 (69th)	An American in Paris	Christopher Wheeldon
2015 (69th)	The King and I	Bartlett Sher
2015 (69th)	On the Town	John Rando
2015 (69th)	Something Rotten!	Casey Nicholaw
2016 (70th)
2016 (70th)	Hamilton	Thomas Kail
2016 (70th)	The Color Purple	John Doyle
2016 (70th)	She Loves Me	Scott Ellis
2016 (70th)	Shuffle Along, or, the Making of the Musical Sensation of 1921 and All That Followed	George C. Wolfe
2016 (70th)	Spring Awakening	Michael Arden
2017 (71st)
2017 (71st)	Come from Away	Christopher Ashley
2017 (71st)	Dear Evan Hansen	Michael Greif
2017 (71st)	Groundhog Day	Matthew Warchus
2017 (71st)	Hello, Dolly!	Jerry Zaks
2017 (71st)	Natasha, Pierre & The Great Comet of 1812	Rachel Chavkin
2018 (72nd)
2018 (72nd)	The Band's Visit	David Cromer
2018 (72nd)	Mean Girls	Casey Nicholaw
2018 (72nd)	My Fair Lady	Bartlett Sher
2018 (72nd)	Once on This Island	Michael Arden
2018 (72nd)	SpongeBob SquarePants	Tina Landau
2019 (73rd)
2019 (73rd)	Hadestown	Rachel Chavkin
2019 (73rd)	Ain't Too Proud	Des McAnuff
2019 (73rd)	Oklahoma!	Daniel Fish
2019 (73rd)	The Prom	Casey Nicholaw
2019 (73rd)	Tootsie	Scott Ellis

=== 2020s ===
Year	Production	Director
2020 (74th)
2020 (74th)	Moulin Rouge! The Musical	Alex Timbers
2020 (74th)	Jagged Little Pill	Diane Paulus
2020 (74th)	Tina: The Tina Turner Musical	Phyllida Lloyd
2022 (75th)
2022 (75th)	Company	Marianne Elliott
2022 (75th)	Girl from the North Country	Conor McPherson
2022 (75th)	MJ	Christopher Wheeldon
2022 (75th)	SIX: The Musical	Lucy Moss and Jamie Armitage
2022 (75th)	A Strange Loop	Stephen Brackett
2023 (76th)
2023 (76th)	Parade	Michael Arden
2023 (76th)	Into the Woods	Lear deBessonet
2023 (76th)	Kimberly Akimbo	Jessica Stone
2023 (76th)	Shucked	Jack O'Brien
2023 (76th)	Some Like It Hot	Casey Nicholaw
2024 (77th)
2024 (77th)	The Outsiders	Danya Taymor
2024 (77th)	Hell's Kitchen	Michael Greif
2024 (77th)	Merrily We Roll Along	Maria Friedman
2024 (77th)	Suffs	Leigh Silverman
2024 (77th)	Water for Elephants	Jessica Stone
2025 (78th)
2025 (78th)	Maybe Happy Ending	Michael Arden
2025 (78th)	Buena Vista Social Club	Saheem Ali
2025 (78th)	Dead Outlaw	David Cromer
2025 (78th)	Death Becomes Her	Christopher Gattelli
2025 (78th)	Sunset Blvd.	Jamie Lloyd
2026 (79th)
2026 (79th)	Cats: The Jellicle Ball	Zhailon Levingston and Bill Rauch
2026 (79th)	The Lost Boys	Michael Arden
2026 (79th)	Ragtime	Lear deBessonet
2026 (79th)	Schmigadoon!	Christopher Gattelli
2026 (79th)	Two Strangers (Carry a Cake Across New York)	Tim Jackson

== Multiple wins ==
8 Wins

- Harold Prince

3 Wins

- Gower Champion
- Tommy Tune

2 Wins

- George Abbott
- Michael Arden
- Michael Bennett
- Wilford Leach
- Des McAnuff
- Trevor Nunn
- Jerome Robbins

== Multiple nominations ==
16 Nominations

- Harold Prince

8 Nominations

- Gower Champion

7 Nominations

- Scott Ellis

6 Nominations

- Bob Fosse
- James Lapine
- Casey Nicholaw
- Trevor Nunn
- Tommy Tune

5 Nominations

- Michael Arden
- Michael Bennett
- Michael Greif
- Des McAnuff
- Jack O'Brien
- Jerry Zaks

4 Nominations

- Richard Maltby Jr.
- Kathleen Marshall
- Michael Mayer
- Diane Paulus
- Bartlett Sher
- Susan Stroman
- George C. Wolfe

3 Nominations

- George Abbott
- Christopher Ashley
- Michael Blakemore
- John Doyle
- Michael Kidd
- Arthur Laurents
- Robert Moore
- Jerome Robbins
- Gene Saks
- Burt Shevelove

2 Nominations

- Lear deBessonet
- Vinnette Carroll
- Martin Charnin
- Rachel Chavkin
- David Cromer
- Cy Feuer
- Christopher Gattelli
- Nicholas Hytner
- Thomas Kail
- Joe Layton
- Wilford Leach
- Joshua Logan
- Mike Nichols
- Mike Ockrent
- Hector Orezzoli
- John Rando
- Claudio Segovia
- Leigh Silverman
- Jessica Stone
- Julie Taymor
- Matthew Warchus
- Christopher Wheeldon

== Female winners and nominees ==
Out of 26 women nominated for 41 musicals, only 6 women have won this award for 6 musicals:

Bold represents winner

Director	Nominated musical(s)
Joan Littlewood	Oh, What a Lovely War! (1965)
Vinnette Caroll	Don't Bother Me, I Can't Cope (1973); Your Arms Too Short to Box with God (1977)
Elizabeth Swados	Runaways (1978)
Barbara Damashek	Quilters (1985)
Susan H. Schulman	Sweeney Todd: The Demon Barber of Fleet Street revival (1990)
Graciela Daniele	Once on this Island (1991)
Eleanor Reissa	Those Were the Days (1992)
**Julie Taymor**	Juan Darién (1997); **The Lion King (1998)**
Ann Reinking	Fosse (1999)
**Susan Stroman**	Contact (2000); The Music Man revival (2000); **The Producers (2001)**; The Scottsboro Boys (2012)
Lynne Taylor-Corbett	Swing! (2000)
Twyla Tharp	Movin' Out (2003)
Kathleen Marshall	Wonderful Town revival (2004); The Pajama Game revival (2006); Anything Goes revival (2011); Nice Work If You Can Get it (2012)
Kristin Hanggi	Rock of Ages (2009)
**Diane Paulus**	Hair revival (2009); Porgy and Bess revival (2012); **Pippin revival (2013)**; Jagged Little Pill (2020)
Marcia Milgrom Dodge	Ragtime revival (2010)
Leigh Silverman	Violet (2014); Suffs (2024)
**Rachel Chavkin**	Natasha, Pierre & The Great Comet of 1812 (2017); **Hadestown (2019)**
Tina Landau	SpongeBob SquarePants (2018)
Phyllida Lloyd	Tina: The Tina Turner Musical (2020)
**Marianne Elliott**	**Company revival (2022)**
Lucy Moss	Six (2022)
Jessica Stone	Kimberly Akimbo (2023); Water for Elephants (2024)
Lear deBessonet	Into the Woods revival (2023); Ragtime revival (2026)
Maria Friedman	Merrily We Roll Along revival (2024)
**Danya Taymor**	**The Outsiders (2024)**

== See also ==
- Tony Award for Best Direction of a Play
- Drama Desk Award for Outstanding Director of a Musical
- Laurence Olivier Award for Best Director
- List of Tony Award-nominated productions
