= Maria Rivarola =

María Rivarola
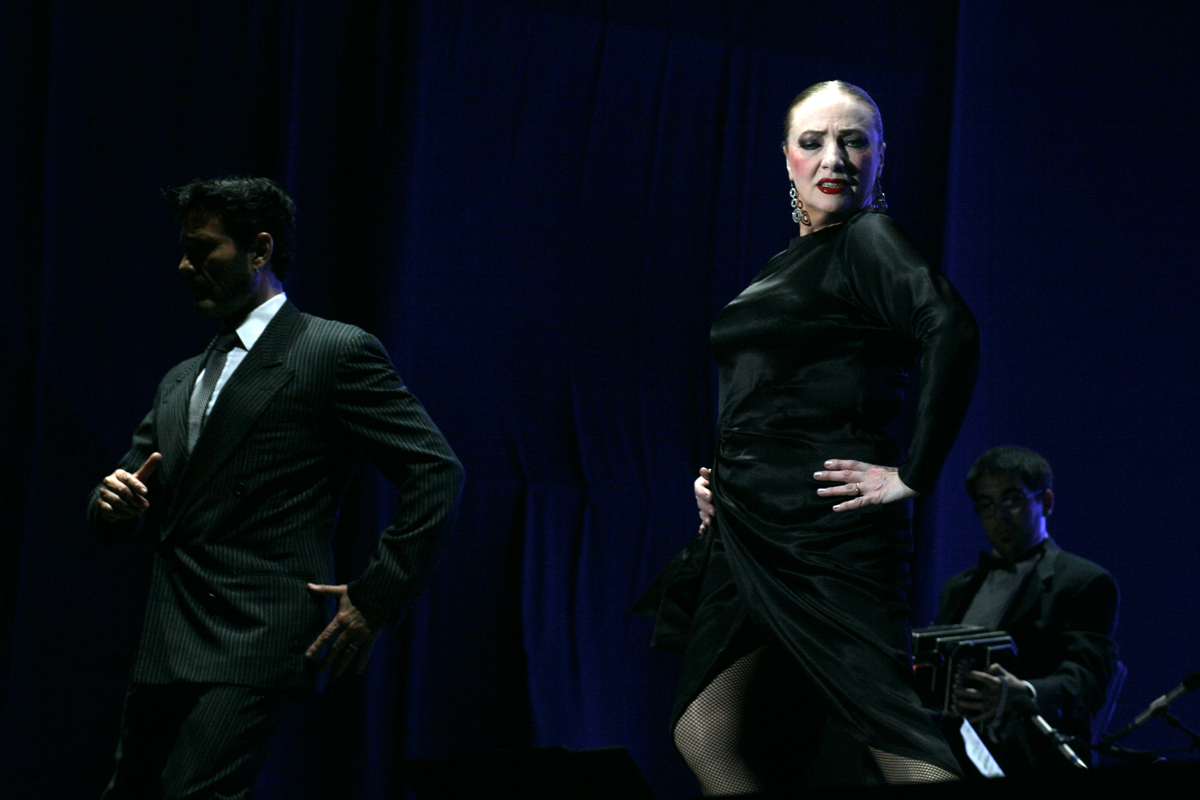
- María y Carlos Rivarola en la presentación de Tango Argentino en Buenos Aires en 2011.

Background information
- Born: María del Carmen Rodríguez de Rivarola; January 7, 1957 (age 69)
- Genres: Tango
- Occupations: ballerina, tango dancer
- Years active: 1975-en adelante
- Website: http://mariaycarlosrivarola.com/

Maria del Carmen Rodriguez de Rivarola, better known by her artistic name Maria Rivarola (born in Buenos Aires, ca. 1957) is an Argentine dancer. She is known for performing a specific style of Argentine Tango known as Milonguero Tango. She is also a cast member of the show Tango Argentino, released in 1983, which resulted in her nomination, along with the rest of the dancers, for the Tony Award in 1986 for Best Choreography. Since her youth, Carlos Rivarola has been her dance partner. Together, they present themselves artistically as Maria and Carlos Rivarola. Maria was one of the founders of the Association of Teachers, Dancers, and Choreographers of the Argentine Tango (ATDCAT) in 2001.

== Biography ==
Maria del Carmen Rodriguez was born in Buenos Aires around the year 1957. She has studied dance since her youth. During her teenage years, she took part in dances that were shown on television and in the theater, dancing mostly the flamenco.

After acting in many different Latin American countries, Maria returned to Argentina in the middle of the decade in 1970. It was then she came to know Carlos Rivarola, with whom she would be a dance and life partner, adopting from that point on the artistic name Maria Rivarola. Together, in 1975, they took part in a show, organized by Nelida and Nelson, which toured Peru, Colombia and Venezuela. In addition, they acted as one of the regular partners for the television program La Botica del Tango directed by Eduardo Bergara Leumann.

In 1983, they joined a cast that premiered in the show Tango Argentino, a theatrical dance production in which half of the thirty-five songs were choreographed, produced by Claudio Segovia and Hector Orezzoli, in Paris. They toured the world for a decade. Maria and Carlos were then nominated, along with the other dancers, for the Tony Award in 1986 for Best Choreography.

Starting in 1984, the couple began traveling to Japan every year, as they established a special artist connection there. In 1996, Carlos and Maria directed a show that they prepared for Japan entitled "Los Grandes del Tango Argentino". The show included the participation of Juan Carlos Copes, Maria Nieves, Nelida and Nelson, Mayoral and Elsa Maria, Carlos and Ines Borquez and the Color Tango Orchestra. Maria and Carlos also founded and maintained many tango clubs and academies in Japan located in Tokyo, Yokohama, Nagoya and Osaka.

== Filmography ==
- Tango Bar (1989) de Marcos Zurinaga

== See also ==
- Argentine Tango
- Media related to Imágenes de Tango Argentino at Wikimedia Commons

== Sources ==
- Mordkovitch, Leticia. "Tango que me hiciste mal..." Buenos Aires: El Arca Digital. Archived from the original on 10 June 2015.
- "Carlos Rivarola". Sitio Oficial de María y Carlos Rivarola. Archived from the original on April 24, 2009.
