= María Nieves =

Argentine tango dancer (1934–2026)

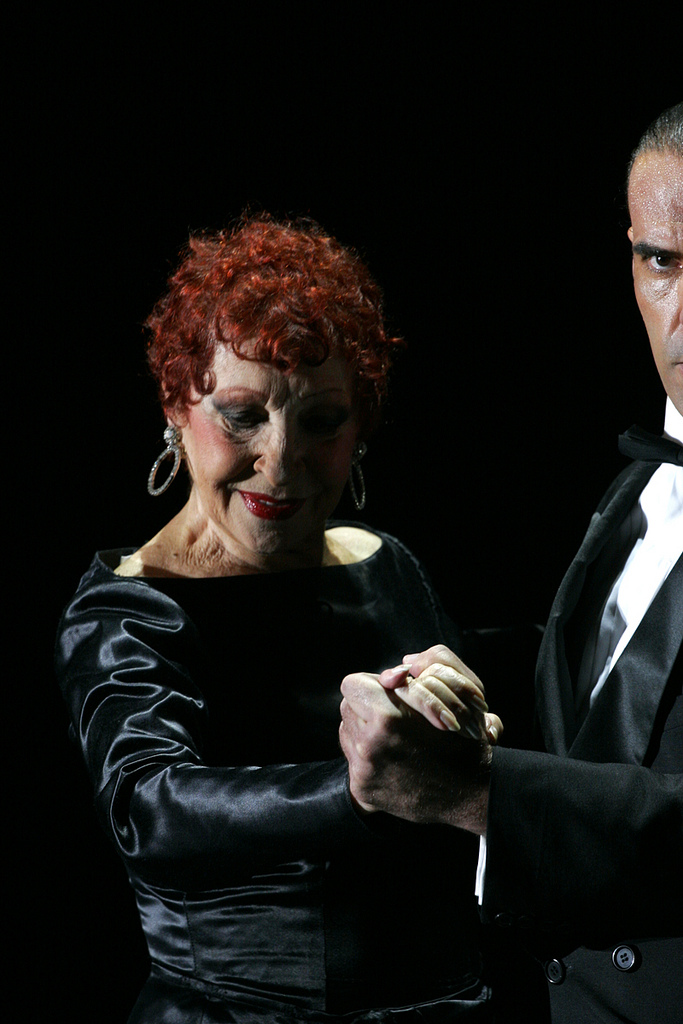
María Nieves (2011)

María Nieves Rego (6 September 1934 – 19 April 2026) was an Argentine tango dancer and choreographer who starred with her long time dance partner Juan Carlos Copes in the 1983 musical Tango Argentino.

== Early life ==
Born in the Saavedra district of Buenos Aires on 6 September 1934, she was the daughter of modest Galician emigrants. After her father died, she left school in the 4th grade to work as a maid in La Boca. She was introduced to the tango by her elder sister known as La Ñata. When she was 14 years old, the 17-year-old Juan Carlos Copes took her as his dance partner; the two would soon become lovers.

== Career ==
Nieves and Juan Carlos Copes brought the tango and the milonga to audiences throughout the world. By 1956 Nieves and Copes had created a dance based on music by Astor Piazzolla but it was after touring through Central America, Venezuela, Brazil, Mexico and Cuba that they were asked to meet Piazzolla in Mexico City. The three of them shared tango music and got on well together. They flew to Puerto Rico in October 1959 where they packed out Club Flamboyan in San Juan with "Compañía Argentina Tangolandia". Piazzolla was serving as the musical director and he dreamt of taking them to North America. The tour continued in New York, Chicago and then Washington. The last show that the three of them did together was an appearance on CBS the only colour TV channel in the US. They featured on The Arthur Murray Party in April 1960.

Nieves and Copes had married in Las Vegas; the marriage did not last, yet they continued to be dance partners for decades.

In the 1980s, they created and starred in the musical Tango Argentino. The show's run had to be extended as Nieves and Copes had been only booked for a week. It moved to another theatre in October and continued there until the following year. With different dancers, it went on for a number of years in New York. In 1986, it received Tony Award nominations for best musical, best director, and best choreographer, and during the 40th Tony Awards show a dance excerpt from Tango Argentino was performed. The book The tango in the United States: a history incorrectly reported that the show had won a Tony Award.

Nieves and Copes went on tour with Tango Argentino in 1999 before starring in Tanguera (2002) in Buenos Aires, New York, Paris, Berlin, Tokyo and then in the West End (2010). Nieves was given the role of the brothel keeper as she is thought of as essential to a tango production.

Nieves offered a simple explanation for her success despite never having had a dancing lesson: "The first time I danced the tango, it entered my skin through my feet, passed from my skin to my blood and through my blood to my heart. It requires no acrobatics, you simply have to devote yourself to your heartbeat."

The 2015 documentary film Un tango más by German Kral depicts the sometimes difficult relationship between Nieves and Copes, dance partners for over 40 years. Nieves attributes her improvement as an artist to the hatred between the two dancers.

Nieves died in Buenos Aires on 19 April 2026, aged 91.
