= Academia Nacional del Tango de la República Argentina =

Coordinates: 34.6086417°S 58.3782453°W

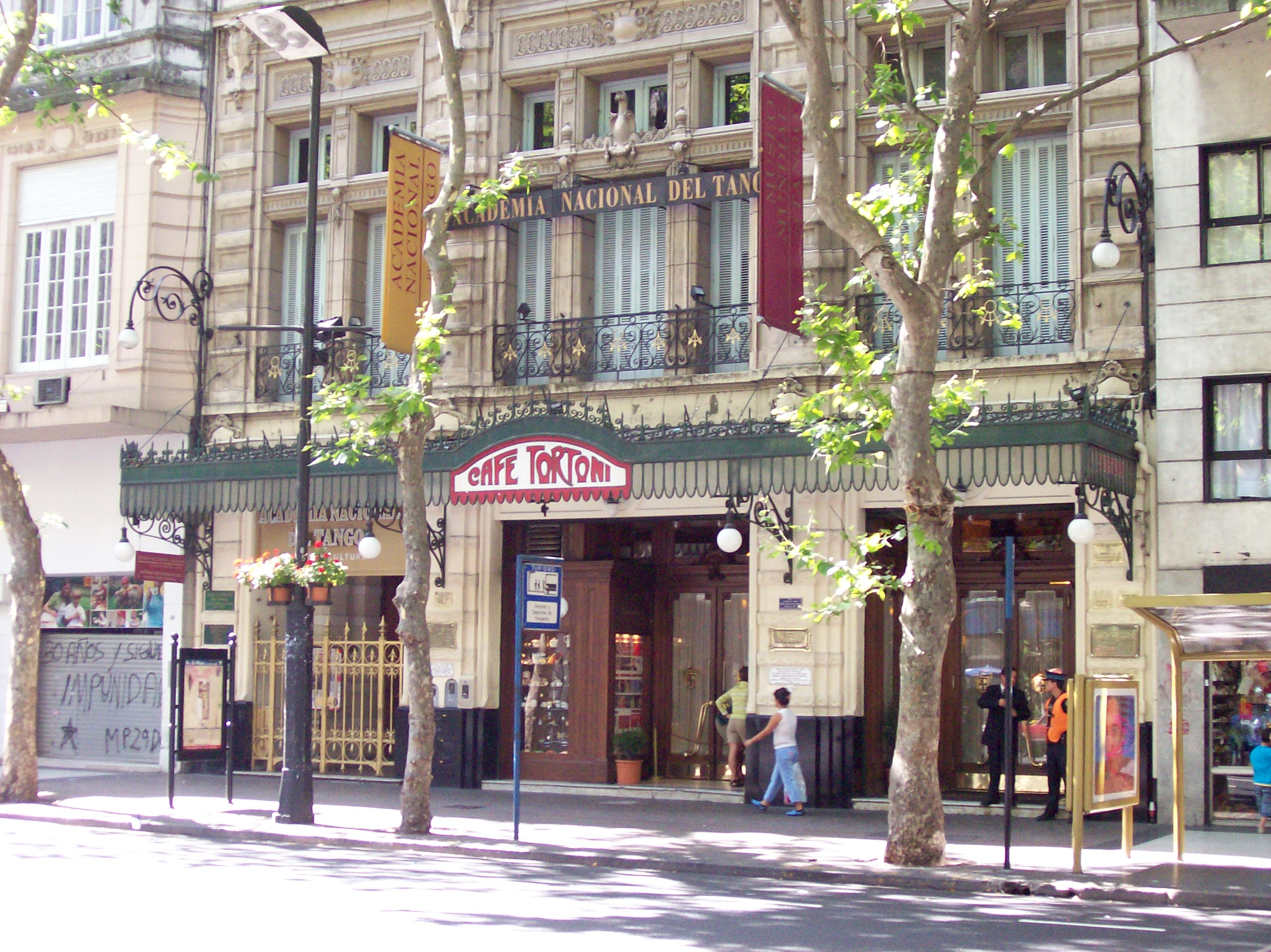
External view from the Avenida de Mayo

Academia Nacional del Tango de la República Argentina is an institution in Buenos Aires, Argentina, located in the Avenida de Mayo above the Café Tortoni.

== Overview ==
The museum was established on June 28, 1990, by national decree with the aim of collecting, sorting, reviewing and saving from loss or destruction the cultural heritage of the tango.

The founder and first president was the poet and tango lyricist Horacio Ferrer.

== Activities ==
The Academy has a comprehensive library and regularly conducts seminars, workshops and exhibitions.

== Publications ==
The Academy has produced a series of publications in different formats (books, magazines, booklets) and the newspapers El Chamuyo and El Chamuyito.

== See also ==
- List of music museums
- Café Tortoni
