= 40th Tony Awards =

1986 US theatrical awards ceremony

- Date: June 1, 1986
- Location: Minskoff Theatre, New York City
- Most wins: The Mystery of Edwin Drood (5)
- Most nominations: The Mystery of Edwin Drood (11)

Television/radio coverage
- Network: CBS

The 40th Annual Tony Awards ceremony was held on June 1, 1986, at the Minskoff Theatre and was broadcast by CBS television.

== Eligibility ==
Shows that opened on Broadway during the 1985–1986 season before May 1, 1986 are eligible.

Original plays

- Benefactors
- Blood Knot
- The Boys in Autumn
- The Boys of Winter
- Corpse!
- Execution of Justice
- The House of Blue Leaves
- I'm Not Rappaport
- Lillian
- The Petition
- Precious Sons
- The Search for Signs of Intelligent Life in the Universe
- So Long on Lonely Street
- Social Security

Original musicals

- Big Deal
- Jerome Kern Goes to Hollywood
- Jerry's Girls
- Mayor
- The Mystery of Edwin Drood
- The News
- Singin' in the Rain
- Song and Dance
- Tango Argentino
- Uptown... It's Hot!
- Wind in the Willows

Play revivals

- Arms and the Man
- The Caretaker
- Hay Fever
- The Iceman Cometh
- Long Day's Journey into Night
- Loot
- The Marriage of Figaro
- The Odd Couple

Musical revivals

- Sweet Charity

== Nominations ==
The American Theatre Wing appointed a 12-member committee to determine the year's nominees. That committee was made up of:

- Jay Carr, Boston Globe theater critic
- Al Hirschfeld, critic and cartoonist
- William Glover, Associated Press theater critic
- George C. White, President of the O'Neill Theater Center
- Schuyler Chapin, Columbia University administrator
- George Cuttingham, Director of American Academy of Dramatic Arts
- David Oppenheim, Dean of the Tisch School at NYU
- Richard L. Coe, Washington Post theater critic
- Alfred Drake, actor
- Norris Houghton, academic
- Leonard Harris, actor and critic
- Mary C. Henderson, academic

== Ceremony ==
The opening number was "Wanna Sing A Show Tune". The special number was "Forty Years of Broadway Show Music", which included songs from musicals including Annie, Big River, Finian's Rainbow, Hello, Dolly!, Fiddler on the Roof, La Cage aux Folles, and Sweet Charity. The finale was the company singing "Give My Regards to Broadway".

There were also vignettes from past Tony Award-winning plays.

The presenters and performers were: Debbie Allen, Susan Anton, Bea Arthur, Nell Carter, Agnes de Mille, José Ferrer, Sandy Duncan, Phyllis Frelich, Helen Hayes, Michael Kidd, Cleo Laine, Jack Lemmon, Hal Linden, John V. Lindsay, Dorothy Loudon, Karen Morrow, Bernadette Peters, Stefanie Powers, Juliet Prowse, Tony Randall, Lee Roy Reams, Ann Reinking, Lee Remick, Alfonso Ribeiro, Chita Rivera, John Rubinstein, Rex Smith, Marlo Thomas, Leslie Uggams, Lily Tomlin, Sam Waterston, Ben Vereen, David Wayne, Tom Wopat.

Musicals that performed were Big Deal ("Beat Me Daddy Eight to the Bar" - Company); Song & Dance ("Unexpected Song" - Bernadette Peters); Tango Argentino (Dance Excerpts - Company); and The Mystery of Edwin Drood ("There You Are"/"Don't Quit While You're Ahead" - George Rose and Company).

== Winners and nominees ==
Winners are in bold

Best Play	Best Musical
**I'm Not Rappaport – Herb Gardner**; Benefactors – Michael Frayn; Blood Knot – Athol Fugard; The House of Blue Leaves – John Guare	**The Mystery of Edwin Drood**; Big Deal; Song and Dance; Tango Argentino
Best Revival	Best Book of a Musical
**Sweet Charity**; Hay Fever; The Iceman Cometh; Loot	**Rupert Holmes - The Mystery of Edwin Drood**; Bob Fosse - Big Deal; Betty Comden and Adolph Green - Singin' in the Rain; Jane Iredale - Wind in the Willows
Best Performance by a Leading Actor in a Play	Best Performance by a Leading Actress in a Play
**Judd Hirsch – I'm Not Rappaport as Nat**; Hume Cronyn – The Petition as General Sir Edmund Milne; Ed Harris – Precious Sons as Fred; Jack Lemmon – Long Day's Journey into Night as James Tyrone	**Lily Tomlin – The Search for Signs of Intelligent Life in the Universe as Various Characters**; Rosemary Harris – Hay Fever as Judith Bliss; Mary Beth Hurt – Benefactors as Sheila; Jessica Tandy – The Petition as Lady Elizabeth Milne
Best Performance by a Leading Actor in a Musical	Best Performance by a Leading Actress in a Musical
**George Rose – The Mystery of Edwin Drood as Mayor Thomas Sapsea/Mr. William Cartwright**; Don Correia – Singin' in the Rain as Don Lockwood; Cleavant Derricks – Big Deal as Charley; Maurice Hines – Uptown... It's Hot! as Performer	**Bernadette Peters – Song and Dance as Emma**; Debbie Allen – Sweet Charity as Charity; Cleo Laine – The Mystery of Edwin Drood as The Princess Puffer/Miss Angela Prysock; Chita Rivera – Jerry's Girls as Performer
Best Performance by a Featured Actor in a Play	Best Performance by a Featured Actress in a Play
**John Mahoney – The House of Blue Leaves as Artie Shaughnessy**; Peter Gallagher – Long Day's Journey into Night as Edmund Tyrone; Charles Keating – Loot as McLeavy; Joseph Maher – Loot as Truscott	**Swoosie Kurtz – The House of Blue Leaves as Bananas Shaughnessy**; Stockard Channing – The House of Blue Leaves as Bunny Flingus; Bethel Leslie – Long Day's Journey into Night as Mary Cavan Tyrone; Zoë Wanamaker – Loot as Fay
Best Performance by a Featured Actor in a Musical	Best Performance by a Featured Actress in a Musical
**Michael Rupert – Sweet Charity as Oscar**; Christopher d'Amboise – Song and Dance as Joe; John Herrera – The Mystery of Edwin Drood as Neville Landless/Mr. Victor Grinstead; Howard McGillin – The Mystery of Edwin Drood as John Jasper/Mr. Clive Paget	**Bebe Neuwirth – Sweet Charity as Nickie**; Patti Cohenour – The Mystery of Edwin Drood as Rosa Bud/Miss Deirdre Peregrine; Jana Schneider – The Mystery of Edwin Drood as Helena Landless/Miss Janet Conover; Elisabeth Welch – Jerome Kern Goes to Hollywood as Performer
Best Original Score (Music and/or Lyrics) Written for the Theatre	Best Choreography
**The Mystery of Edwin Drood – Rupert Holmes (music and lyrics)**; The News – Paul Schierhorn (music and lyrics); Song and Dance – Andrew Lloyd Webber (music), Don Black (lyrics) and Richard Maltby Jr. (additional lyrics); Wind in the Willows – William P. Perry (music) and Roger McGough (lyrics)	**Bob Fosse – Big Deal**; Graciela Daniele – The Mystery of Edwin Drood; Peter Martins – Song and Dance; Tango Argentino Dancers – Tango Argentino
Best Direction of a Play	Best Direction of a Musical
**Jerry Zaks – The House of Blue Leaves**; Jonathan Miller – Long Day's Journey into Night; José Quintero – The Iceman Cometh; John Tillinger – Loot	**Wilford Leach – The Mystery of Edwin Drood**; Bob Fosse – Big Deal; Richard Maltby Jr. – Song and Dance; Claudio Segovia and Hector Orezzoli – Tango Argentino
Best Scenic Design	Best Costume Design
**Tony Walton – The House of Blue Leaves**; Ben Edwards – The Iceman Cometh; David Mitchell – The Boys in Winter; Beni Montresor – The Marriage of Figaro	**Patricia Zipprodt – Sweet Charity**; Willa Kim – Song and Dance; Beni Montresor – The Marriage of Figaro; Ann Roth – The House of Blue Leaves
Best Lighting Design
**Pat Collins – I'm Not Rappaport**; Jules Fisher – Song and Dance; Paul Gallo – The House of Blue Leaves; Thomas R. Skelton – The Iceman Cometh

== Special award ==
- Regional Theatre Award - American Repertory Theater, Cambridge, Massachusetts

=== Multiple nominations and awards ===
These productions had multiple nominations:

- 11 nominations: The Mystery of Edwin Drood
- 8 nominations: The House of Blue Leaves and Song and Dance
- 5 nominations: Big Deal, Loot and Sweet Charity
- 4 nominations: The Iceman Cometh and Long Day's Journey into Night
- 3 nominations: I'm Not Rappaport and Tango Argentino
- 2 nominations: Benefactors, Hay Fever, The Marriage of Figaro, The Petition, Singin' in the Rain and Wind in the Willows

The following productions received multiple awards.

- 5 wins: The Mystery of Edwin Drood
- 4 wins: The House of Blue Leaves and Sweet Charity
- 3 wins: I'm Not Rappaport

== See also ==
- Drama Desk Awards
- 1986 Laurence Olivier Awards – equivalent awards for West End theatre productions
- Obie Award
- New York Drama Critics' Circle
- Theatre World Award
- Lucille Lortel Awards
