= Uptown... It's Hot! =

Uptown... It's Hot! was a 1986 Broadway musical created, directed, choreographed by and starring Maurice Hines. Performed at the Lunt-Fontanne Theatre, the musical was an anthology chronicling the history of African-American music in the United States.

Although the music garnered praise, the musical received generally unfavorable reviews. New York Times critic Frank Rich called it "the theatrical equivalent of a telephone-booth-stuffing contest" and "an orgy of grotesque and sometimes necrophiliac mimicry." The musical did, however, earn Hines a Tony Award nomination for Best Performance by a Leading Actor in a Musical.

Uptown... It's Hot! ran from January 28 to February 16, 1986, ending its run after 24 performances.

== Awards and nominations ==
=== Original Broadway production ===
| Year | Award | Category | Nominee | Result |
|---|---|---|---|---|
| 1986 | Tony Award | Best Actor in a Musical | Maurice Hines | Nominated |
