= Héctor Orezzoli =

Argentine theatre director and designer (1953–1991)

Héctor Orezzoli (1953 — December 5, 1991) was an Argentine stage director, costume designer, set designer, and lighting designer. Along with his creative partner Claudio Segovia, he co-created the musical revues Flamenco Pure, Tango Argentino, and Black and Blue which were produced and staged by them on stages internationally; including Broadway in New York and theaters throughout Europe and South America. For Black and Blue, the two men won the 1989 Tony Award for Best Costume Design and were nominated for the Tony Award for Best Scenic Design and the Tony Award for Best Direction of a Musical.

== Life and career ==
Orezzoli was born in Buenos Aires in 1953. He completed studies in literature and psychology at the University of Buenos Aires before pursuing further education in drama and scenic design at the University of Belgrano.

In 1973 Orezzoli was introduced to stage director Claudio Segovia, and the two began an artistic partnership soon after that lasted until Orezzoli's death in New York City fourteen years later. Together the two men created and staged several theatrical revues featuring traditional dance forms like tango, flamenco, and salsa which toured internationally. They had a major critical success with Flamenco Pure in Seville in 1980, and a second revised version in Paris 1984. They had another major success in Paris a year earlier with Tango Argentino which premiered at the 1983 Festival d'Automne. This work transferred to Broadway, garnering nominations for the Tony Award for Best Musical and the Tony Award for Best Choreography at the 40th Tony Awards. In 1989 the two men won the Tony Award for Best Costume Design and was nominated for the Tony Award for Best Scenic Design and the Tony Award for Best Direction of a Musical for their work on the Broadway musical Black and Blue.
