= Alba Solís =

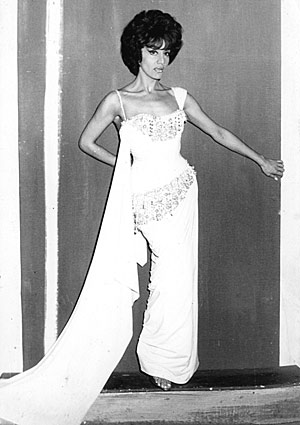
Alba Solís

Alba Solís (born Ángela Herminia Lamberti; 18 October 1927 – 3 February 2016) was an Argentine singer, actress, and vedette. Her style was characterized by singing tangos in a dramatic manner. She was born in the Floresta area of Buenos Aires to Italian parents, Oreste Juan Guillermo Lamberti and Herminia Trapanese.

== Filmography ==
- Carne (1968)
- La cigarra está que arde (1967)
- Luna Park (1960)
- Estrellas de Buenos Aires (1956)
- Maleficio (1953)
- De turno con la muerte (1951)
- Escándalo nocturno (1951)

== See also ==
- List of tango singers
