= Claudio Segovia =

Argentinian stage artist (1933–2025)

Claudio Gastón Segovia
- Born: 31 August 1933; Buenos Aires, Argentina
- Died: 21 December 2025 (aged 92); Buenos Aires, Argentina
- Occupations: Theatre director, producer, choreographer, scenic designer, lighting designer and costume designer

Claudio Gastón Segovia (31 August 1933 – 21 December 2025) was an Argentine theatre director, producer, choreographer, scenic designer, lighting designer and costume designer.

== Life and career ==
Born and raised in Buenos Aires, a fellowship from the National Culture Administration enabled him to study scenography at the Escuela Superior de Bellas Artes de la Nación Ernesto de la Cárcova (now part of the Universidad Nacional de las Artes). He later pursued further studies at the Escuela Nacional de Bellas Artes Prilidiano Pueyrredón.

Particularly known for his work with artistic partner Héctor Orezzoli, the two men have staged several theatrical revues featuring traditional dance forms like tango, flamenco, and salsa which have toured internationally. They had a major critical success with Flamenco Pure in Seville in 1980, and a second revised version in Paris 1984.

They had another major success in Paris a year earlier with Tango Argentino which premiered at the 1983 Festival d'Automne. This work transferred to Broadway, garnering nominations for the Tony Award for Best Musical and the Tony Award for Best Choreography at the 40th Tony Awards. In 1989 Segovia won the Tony Award for Best Costume Design and was nominated for the Tony Award for Best Scenic Design and the Tony Award for Best Direction of a Musical for his work on the Broadway musical Black and Blue. He also won the Konex Award from Argentina in 1992 for his work as stage designer.

Segovia died on 21 December 2025 at the age of 92.
