= Milonguero =

Social tango dancer

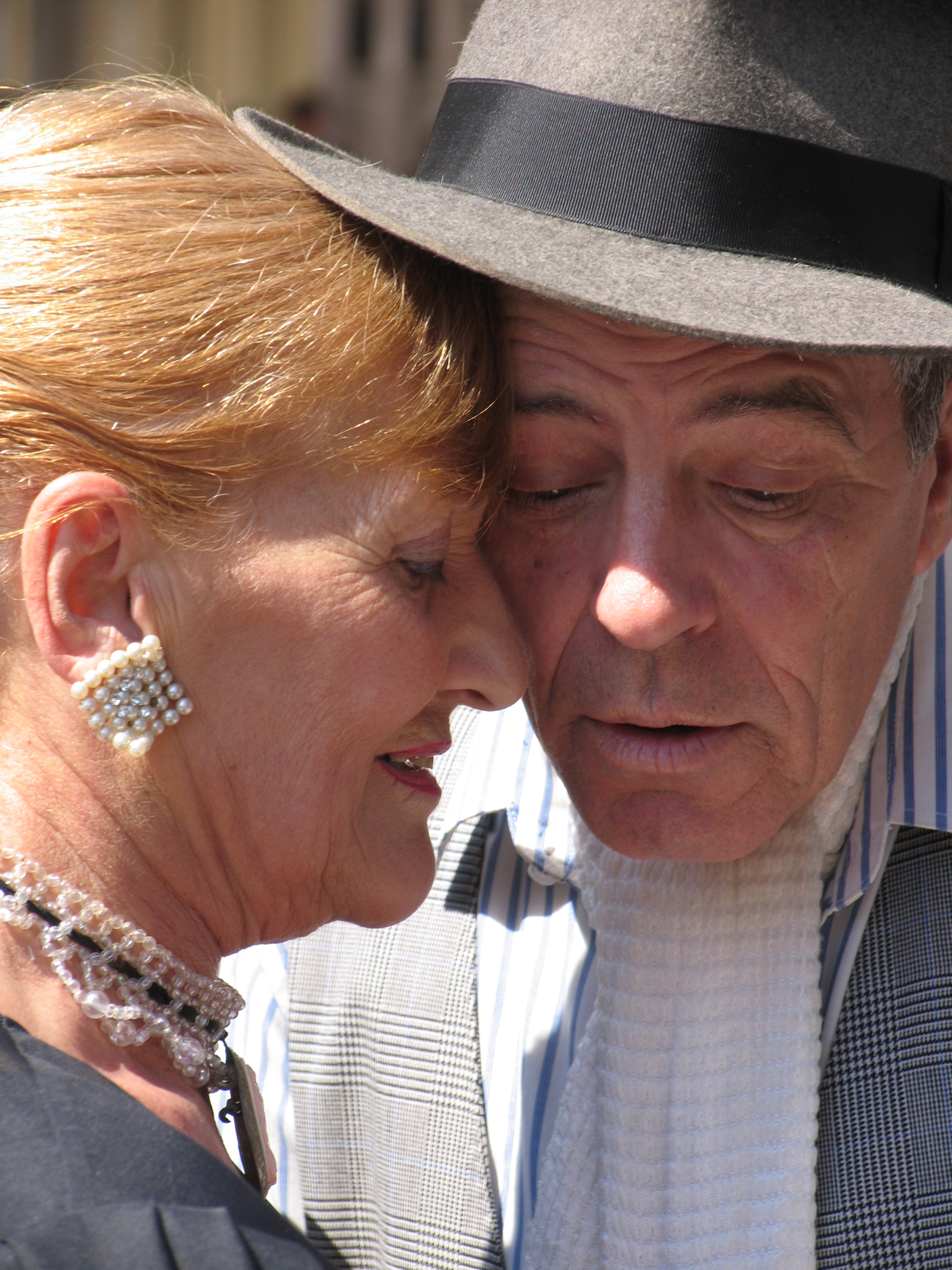
Veteran tango dancers

A milonguero is a person who spends time dancing social tango. The word comes from the term milonga referring to a tango dance event.

The term was used from the 1870s to mark a man who spent much of his time dancing tango of any style. Since the early 20th century the term referred to a man immersed in the tango culture specific to Buenos Aires. A milonguero frequented dance halls, dancing to the music of tango, milonga and vals. Such a man was "raised and groomed on tango" and his "reverence for the dance and its traditions" strongly influenced the way he danced. The term milonguero was used by others to distinguish a skilled and courteous dancer, not a term for oneself. After the 1955 coup ousted Juan Perón in Argentina, the tango was repressed, a sort of "dark age" for tango dancing, ending in 1983.

Until the beginning of the 1980s milonguero also had a strong negative connotation, signaling a womanizer who typically had no job. Such womanizers would typically visit downtown milongas and cafes where anonymity was more prevalent than in the clubs of the barrios; the crowded circumstances and the greater intimacy allowed by the greater anonymity fostered a close-embrace style dancing, which was the motivation of Susana Miller to use the term milonguero to denote the close embrace style dancing prevalent in downtown milongas.

The term milonguero changed to mean one who had been a frequent dancer during tango's Golden Age of the 1930s and '40s and it also lost its negative connotations. Due to the loss of the negative connotations there are more dancers who would nowadays be considered milongueros - such as many respected and skillful salon style dancers of the barrios - and hence the identification of the dance of milongueros with milonguero-style tango is no longer apt.

Though there are many individual differences between men, milongueros generally dress conservatively, wearing a sport coat or suit, dress shirt and often a tie. They do not attempt to converse with their partner during a song. They are keenly aware of others on the dance floor and they maintain the "line of dance", a stately progression of all the couples moving counter-clockwise around the dance floor. The milonguero does not bump into or kick other dancers; he employs mostly circular movements to keep an inward focus for himself and his partner, and to allow for small adornments made with the foot. Above all, he interprets the mood of the music with his dancing. He cherishes each musical pause as it comes, and he executes movements that coincide with musical phrases.

The milonguero generally selects skillful partners to maintain his reputation. He makes certain to lead his partner into movements that will show her in the best light; he does not show off his own skill to the detriment of his partner. He knows that if he makes the woman look good dancing then he looks good dancing.

He dances to songs from his favorite artists, sitting out the others. Many milongueros prefer music of the Golden Age of tango, especially the marked rhythmic music of Juan D'Arienzo, the older rhythmic pulses of Francisco Lomuto, or the sweeping orchestrations of Carlos di Sarli. Many milongueros will not dance to a song sung by a female vocalist or—out of great respect—a song sung by Carlos Gardel. Some take this preference further and will not dance to any song containing lyrics. Modern tangos such as those by Astor Piazzolla are generally avoided; the transitional later tangos of Osvaldo Pugliese, with their emphasis on tempo changes, are shunned by many but particularly favored by others. Recordings produced before 1983 are preferred. Popular tango tunes from the Golden Age never fade for the milonguero: veteran dancer José "Poroto" Oviedo told his friends to "play di Sarli at my wake", a request that was honored at his death in April 2000, the romantic di Sarli song "Bahía Blanca" chosen for the occasion.

In modern times, the feminine form milonguera has been used to refer to a woman who is an avid tango dancer, one who goes out dancing as much as possible. Other similar terms are tanguero for a man and tanguera for a woman.
