= Juan Carlos Copes =

Argentine tango dancer (1931–2021)

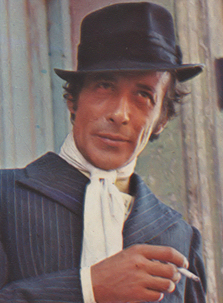
- Born: 31 May 1931; Buenos Aires, Argentina
- Died: 16 January 2021 (aged 89); Buenos Aires, Argentina
- Occupation(s): Tango dancer, choreographer, and instructor
- Years active: 1940s–2015

Juan Carlos Copes (31 May 1931 – 16 January 2021) was an Argentine tango dancer, choreographer, and performer. He started dancing with Maria Nieves when he was 17 and she 14, and the pair later married. Copes and Nieves played a leading role in the renaissance in Tango dancing from the 1970s and, particularly, in Argentine Tango following the 1983 restoration of democracy in that country. Copes was the first to create choreographed tango stage shows and also worked on seven films. Later in his career he partnered with his daughter, Johana, from his second marriage.

== Early life and career ==
Copes was born in Mataderos, Buenos Aires, on 31 May 1931, and grew up in Villa Pueyrredón. He began dancing at milongas in Buenos Aires at a young age. When he was 17 years old, he took the 14-year-old María Nieves as his dance partner; the two would soon become lovers. Nieves described Copes as a poor dancer initially, but said he improved quickly. They entered their first competitive dance in 1955 at Luna Park Stadium. An early professional performance was with the Francisco Canaro orchestra in 1955.

Copes married Nieves in Las Vegas in 1964, but the marriage did not last and ended in 1973. They continued to dance together, and Nieves described the hatred between them as improving their art. During their four decade partnership they became known as the "Fred Astaire and Ginger Rogers of tango".

During the 1960s, Copes was instrumental in creating the modern tango show concept in Buenos Aires. Copes and Nieves starred in a 1962 production at the Alvin Theatre on Broadway as well as appearing on numerous episodes of The Ed Sullivan Show from 1962 to 1964. Their "Tango Argentino" show, starring Elvira Santamaría and her partner Virulazo, premiered in Paris in 1983, appearing on Broadway in 1985, and being recreated on Broadway in 1999. He also danced at the Juilliard School, Stanford University, the University of Chicago and the Sorbonne University.

== Tango renaissance ==
Copes played a part in the worldwide revival of tango as a dance form after 1970. The reintroduction of democracy to Argentina led to a renaissance in Argentine Tango in which Copes and Nieves were leading figures. Copes taught the style, which was later known as the "estilo Copes-Nieves," to many dancers and his pupils included Robert Duvall, Julio Bocca, Eleonora Cassano, Mikhail Baryshnikov and Liza Minnelli. He also taught some of the dance instructors of the Fred Astaire Dance Studios.

Copes had a daughter, Johana, with his second wife, Myriam Albuernez (who was 20 years his junior) in 1976, and he began to dance with her on stage in 1994.

== Credits ==
Copes was the first to create choreographed tango stage shows. His credits included chief choreographer of Ástor Piazzolla's María de Buenos Aires (1968). He also choreographed Tangos Para El Mundo, Copes Tango Show, Entre Borges y Piazzolla and Sentimiento de Tango.

Copes worked on seven films. His credits include Raúl de la Torre's musical, Funes, un gran amor (1993), Tango Baile Nuestro with Robert Duvall, "Arena de Tango Mío for the BBC and as chief choreographer in Tango, la película (Tango, the Movie), a 1998 film by Carlos Saura.

== Later life ==
Copes retired from dancing in 2015 for health and financial reasons. In the same year German Kral's documentary film O Nosso Último Tango ("Our Last Tango") showed Copes' often difficult relationship with Nieves.

Copes died from COVID-19 at a Buenos Aires hospital on 16 January 2021, during the COVID-19 pandemic in Argentina. He had first contracted the disease in December 2020.
