= Milonguero style =

Milonguero
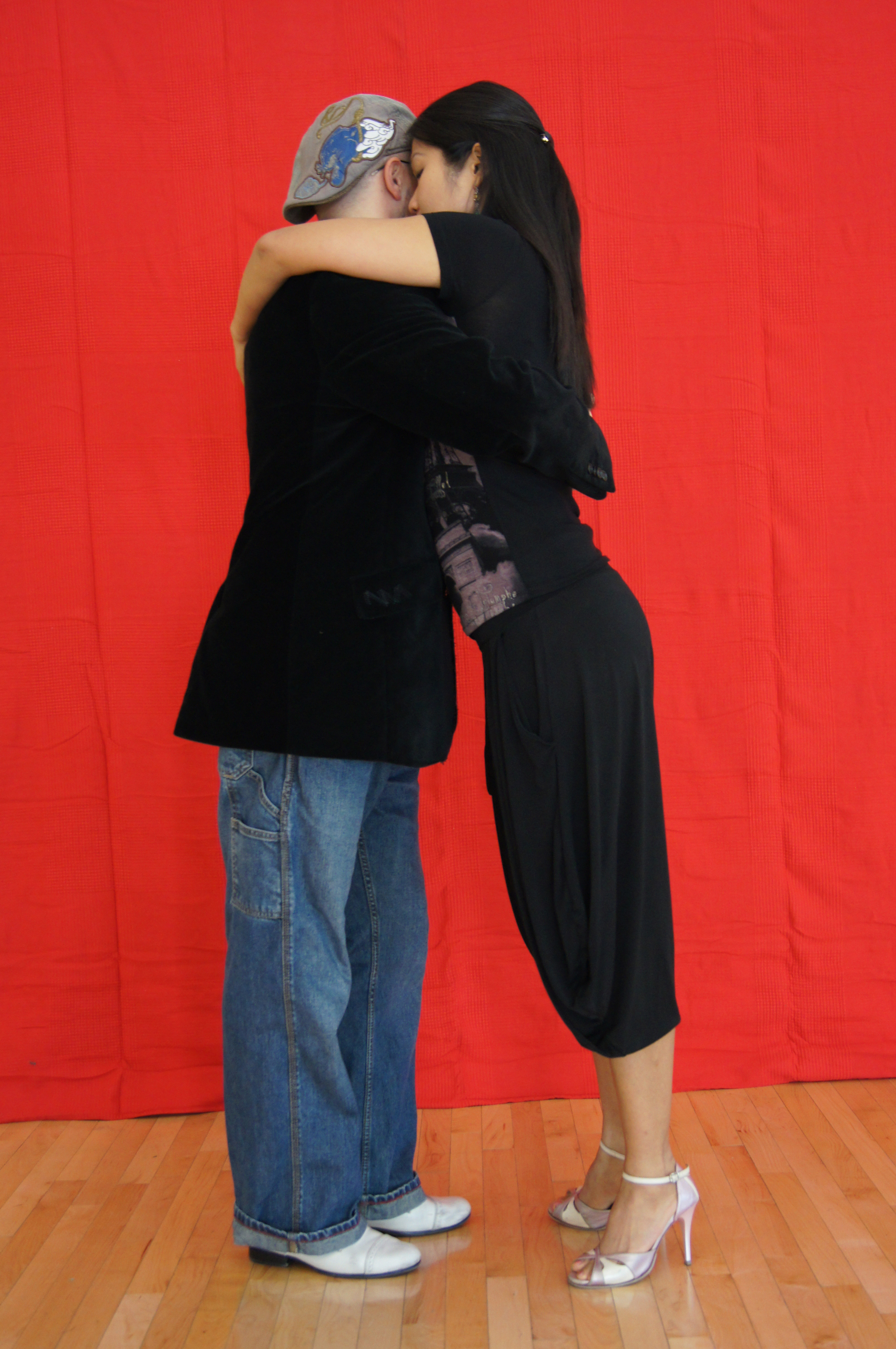
- Cristina and Homer Ladas demonstrate the milonguero-style embrace
- Genre: Tango, milonga
- Inventor: Pedro "Tete" Rusconi; Susana Miller
- Origin: Argentina

Milonguero is a style of close-embrace tango dancing, the name coined by Susana Miller and Oscar "Cacho" Dante from the Argentine word "milonguero". Milonguero is a term for a skillful and respectful tango dancer who holds a reverence for the type of traditional social tango that is danced at milongas in Buenos Aires, Argentina. The two uses of the term do not coincide: many dancers who are considered to be milongueros do not dance milonguero-style tango.

== Origin ==
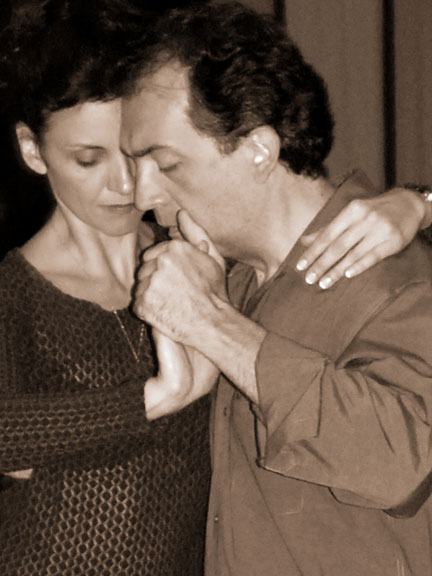
Gustavo Naveira and Giselle Anne

Milonguero-style tango, also known as estilo milonguero (in Buenos Aires, known by name Estilo del centro because it originates from downtown milongas where dance floors were crowded) or apilado (piled up, stacked), is a close-embrace style of social tango dancing in which the focus is inward and the leg and arm movements are kept small. The style developed from and is appropriate to crowded dance floors. The term was coined by Buenos Aires-born tango dancer Susana Miller in the 1990s in the process of teaching others the kind of inwardly focused tango dancing that was practiced by veteran dancers in the social dance venues of central Buenos Aires, differentiating it from the more pronounced movements of outer Buenos Aires and other less crowded milongas, and especially to separate it from choreographed stage tango.

== Style ==
In the milonguero-style embrace, the woman moves her left hand past her partner's right shoulder (where it would be in open embrace) around his neck and back to end up near his left shoulder, depending on the relative heights of the dancers. Her left arm will lie above the man's right arm with no space between them, but she will not hold tension in that arm—he should barely feel the weight of her arm. The two faces may touch, they will at least be very close. With a straight back she leans against her partner at a more pronounced angle than his, he leans slightly toward her but may appear to be standing upright. Rhythmically, the two will indulge in small adornments with the feet until just before the next beat, changing weight at the last possible moment.

Barbara Garvey, the co-founder of the Bay Area Tango Association based in San Francisco, said that she and her husband Al saw in 1987 that "a very simple form of close embrace was prevalent in the center of [Buenos Aires], but not in other barrios." This style was expanded upon by Pedro "Tete" Rusconi who was the first to teach close embrace in the US, joined by Susana Miller who gave the style its name. In 1994, Daniel Trenner taught at Stanford University's Tango Week, describing the Rusconi/Miller milonguero style as the only authentic Buenos Aires tango. From the late 1980s, a sense of tango community had been growing in the San Francisco Bay Area, and after '94 it adopted an emphasis on milonguero style, along with other forms of close embrace. By the late-1990s a milonga could be found in San Francisco on any night of the week. Traveling tango performers would appear at the dance venues after their shows, but they would change from show attire and style to salon-style dancing and more conservative clothing. However, from around 1996 when Madonna was in Buenos Aires making the film Evita, women's dress at milongas grew more sheer and revealing. Also in the late 1990s but in Athens, the term tango milonguero came to represent a movement to recreate in Greece a sense of "authentic" Buenos Aires, with tango aficionados organizing Argentine-style milongas and encouraging a sense of community among the dancers.

Relative to other styles of tango, milonguero style is sometimes viewed as restrictive and limiting, especially in the context of tango nuevo which emphasizes playful exploration and freedom of movement. On the other hand, milonguero-style dancers may regard with suspicion the nuevo-style introduction of electronic and other non-traditional music to the dance floor. Milongueros decry the sort of exhibitionism demonstrated by large movements and showy dance figures. Nevertheless, some practitioners and teachers have combined milonguero elements with a nuevo outlook to create milonguero nuevo, a blend that is safe for crowded dance floors yet full of playful interaction between the two partners.

== External links / sources ==
- Tango and Chaos in Buenos Aires: online book about tango culture and tango dancing in Buenos Aires of 2000s
