= Figures of Argentine tango =

Elements of Argentine tango

Figures of Argentine tango are elements of Argentine tango.

== Introduction and terminology ==
=== History ===
On the basis of several instructional tango books published between 1911–1925 early tango figures can be grouped into eight categories: corte, paseo, la marcha, ocho, grapevine, ruedas, media luna, molinette. From that period we still have: ocho, sentada, media luna, molinete, sandwich.

Name	Argentine tango between 1911–1925	Picture
Corte (detención, freno, parada)	Break and style of dance (bailar con corte, a la quebrada).	
Quebrada	Style of dance (bailar con corte, a la quebrada) (see Rudolf Valentino).	
Media luna.	Half moon.	
Promenade	Popular salida at that time.	
Rueda	Rotation around the follower.	
Scissors	Movement which starts with promenade and is followed by a step; repeated.	

In 2010 there exists as many as 200 instructional DVDs discussing elements of Argentine tango dance. These include titles devoted to tango technique and basics tango nuevo milonguero style (also known by estilo del centro in Buenos Aires) and various elements of the dance such as giros. There are many guides and dictionaries to tango terminology on the internet. Tango terminology is described in several books.

=== Terminology ===
Alternative names are provided in (braces) but usage of tango related names varies: for example entrada and sacada or voleo and boleo may be used to describe the same steps. The names used here follow many sources including English instructional DVDs (such as Christy Coté and George Garcia DVDs published by Dancevision), Argentine DVDs which often have English subtitles, internet resources, and published books and glossaries.

== Basic concepts: axis, steps, embrace. ==
=== Body position and basic steps ===
Effective lead and elegant following depends on proper position of feet, hips, and torso of the leader and the follower.

Spanish	English	Description – Body position and basic steps	Image	Image
Pie activo	Active foot	The foot which is about to walk or walking.		
Pie soporte	Supporting foot	The foot which carries the weight.		
	Leg projection	One leg is on-axis and the other is projected, big toe stays on the floor. This element is the basis of many steps.		
Paso	Step	Side, forward, back step. See also forward cross step and backward cross step		
Posición panget	Tango close (position 0, collection)	Collecting feet at the end of the figure. This is sometimes called position 0 of the eight count basic (basic step).		
Disociar	Dissociation (contra body)	Position in which there is dissociation between torso and hips. One classic lead with strong dissociation is used during the simple salida (i.e. transition between position 2 and position 3 of the basic step).		
Cadencia (balanceo)	Cadence (weight change)	Weight change in place. Used, for example, in Position 8 of the basic step. It is used as subtle lead during breaks or to adjust the follow position.		
Cunita	Rock step (small cradle)	Rocking or swaying to side, forward, or back. Comes from rocking a cuna (cradle)		

=== On and off axis ===
Position-related concepts of Argentine tango are axis and off-axis positions. Body position in which legs are approximately perpendicular to the floor is called 'axis' and there are two axis positions associated with one of two legs. Off-axis positions are called apile (apilado, carpa, volcada) or colgada. The center of balance moves outside one's body in case of the off-axis moves.

Spanish	English	Position	Description – On and off axis	Image
Position normal, el eje	Normal position	On-axis	Body position in which one leg is approximately perpendicular to the floor. Center of weight is within the body. Feet position is with her heels together, and toes pointing slightly out. Her weight is on one leg or nearly so. See also collect.	
Carpa, Apile, Apilado, Volcada	Apile (volcada)	Off-axis	Position in which both partners are leaning forward, may vary in degree of the tilt or shape. Many fluid and elegant tango figures can be danced in volcada position.	
Colgada	Colgada	Off-axis	Position in which both partners are leaning back, may vary in degree of the tilt and body shape (see colgada shapes). Many fluid and elegant tango figures can be danced in colgada position.	

== Embrace and styles ==
Argentine tango dancing consists of a variety of styles that developed in different regions and eras and in response to the crowding of the venue and even the fashions in clothing. It is danced in an embrace that can vary from very open, in which the dancers connect at arm's length, to very closed, in which the connection is chest-to-chest, or anywhere in between. Styles of dance are not predefined by the embrace itself and many figures of tango salon style are danced in an open embrace, it is also possible to dance tango nuevo in close V-shape embrace. The milonguero (apilado) style is an exception; its close embrace without V-shape and emphasis on maintaining this embrace throughout the dance predetermines range of possible movements and their shape.

=== Dance embraces ===
Spanish	English	Associated styles	Description – Embrace and styles	Image	Image
Abrazo cerrado	V-shape close embrace	Salon and tango nuevo	The dancers' chests are closer to each other than their hips, and often there is contact at about the level of the chest (the contact point differing, depending on the height of the leader and the closeness of the embrace). In close embrace, the leader and the follower's chests are in contact and they are dancing with their heads touching or very near each other.		
Abrazo abierto	Open embrace	Tango nuevo, salon	In open embrace, there can be as much space as desired between the partners, but there should always be complete contact along the embracing arms to give optimum communication. Argentine tango dancers do not hold their upper bodies arched away from each other; each partner is over their own axis. Whether open or closed, a tango embrace is not rigid, but relaxed, like a hug.		
Apilado (estilo milonguero, estilo del centro [de Buenos Aires])	Square close embrace	Style milonguero	Milonguero style of embrace is danced in closed position, chest-to-chest, with the partners leaning – or appearing to lean – slightly toward each other to allow space for the feet to move. The follower's left arm position on the leader's shoulder is a style issue. It originates and is used in crowded milongas where there is so much people that you're literally dancing in "square". In those places the lifted arm avoids touching and accidentally hurting other people during turns. Close embrace, no V-shape.		
Tango al reves, doble frente	Reverse embrace	Tango salon and nuevo	Reverse embrace where both partners face the same direction; it is now used only occasionally to perform tango figures (see doble frente).		

=== Practice embraces ===
Embrace hold used during tango practice. One example is when both partners hold hands, the follower holds the leader's shoulders, and variants.

Spanish	English	Description – Practice embrace	Image
Pareja tomada	Practice embrace	Both holding arms in practice position.	
Pareja tomada	Practice embrace	She holds his arms in practice position.	
Pareja tomada	Practice embrace	Holding him in "tea kettle" position.	
Pareja tomada	Practice embrace	Holding each other.	

== Walk and salidas ==
=== Walking systems ===
Walking in a cross system is defined as the couple stepping simultaneously with their two right legs and stepping simultaneously with their two left legs. Walking in a parallel system is defined as the couple stepping simultaneously with the leader's right and follower's left leg, and then with the leader's left and the follower's right leg. When dancers are facing each other, the cross system results in an anti-mirror effect. For this reason, in ballroom tango cross system is never used unless both dancers are facing the same direction. Argentine tango, however, makes extensive use of the cross system with dancers facing each other. In Argentine tango, the leader can change his weight from one foot to another while the follower's weight remains unchanged; this is the simplest method of changing from parallel system to cross system or vice versa. By contrast in ballroom tango, a weight change by one partner leads to an automatic weight change by the other.

The cross system and parallel system walk nomenclature originated with the Naveira/Salas "Investigation Group." Early on, they used 'even/uneven' to describe the arrangement of legs in the walk or turn. By the mid-1990s, they began using 'parallel/crossed' and later 'normal/crossed'. The process of changing from the parallel system to cross system (or vice versa) by having the leader change weight without the follower changing weight (or vice versa) is named contrapaso, or "contra-step". This change can be made off or on the normal beat.

Spanish	English	Description – Walk elements	Image
Sistema paralelo	Parallel walk	The leader steps with his left leg forward, the follower steps with her right leg back; the leader steps with his right leg forward and the follower with her left leg back	
Sistema cruzado	Cross walk	The leader steps with his right leg forward, the follower steps with her right leg back; the leader steps with his left leg forward and the follower with her left leg back	
Contrapaso	Weight change	Weight change used to switch between parallel and cross system of walking.	
Americana	Promenade (sweetheart walk)	Walking by facing the same direction and stepping forward. This resembles a walk in the park by sweethearts (except they may hold their hands together whereas in tango the embrace is preserved). This walk can be initiated by salida Americana.	

=== Eight count basic (8CB) ===
Basic step (paso básico, basico cuadrado y cruzado) is used for education purposes and almost never danced as a basic step of tango. For this reason it is sometimes called pejoratively academic basic. Nevertheless, it contains basic elements of the dance. Also, it serves a purpose of "establishing notation" to more complex tango elements. Basic step (eight count basic, 8CB) is composed of back step, side step, cross for the follower (leader steps outside of his partner with his right leg), forward step, and side step. Basic steps can also be divided into four phases: salida – position 1 and 2 and transition from position 2 to position 3; caminata (position 3 and 4), cross (position 5), and resolution (positions 6,7,8). There are variants of the basic step.

Spanish	English	Description – Basic step (8 count basic)	Image
Position cero	Position 0 (tango close)	Collection. Feet closed. See also collect	
Uno (salida atrás, primera)	Position 1	Back step, part of salida (not used in social dancing)	
Dos (salida costado, apertura, segunda)	Position 2	Side step, open step, part of salida or beginning of the salida	
Tres	Position 3	Salida simple (basico cuadrado) or crossed (basico cruzado); beginning of the basic step walk.	
Cuatro (caminata)	Position 4	Basic step walk.	
Cinco, cruce	Position 5 (cross)	Cross. See also cross.	
Seis	Position 6	Walk, part of resolution.	
Siete	Position 7	Side step to right, open step, part of resolution.	
Ocho	Position 8	Weight change, part of resolution. See also cadence.	

Baldosa (tile) or cuadrado (square) is a six-step figure similar to the ballroom box step except the leader starts with their right foot, then steps back, side, forward, forward, side, feet together; the baldosa is the basic step of milonga. This baldosa is similar to eight count basic with the exception of the cross.

Some Argentine tango teachers teach complex figures but break them down into simpler parts. Subsequently, they teach students how to improvise their own figures. Beginner classes may include caminada – combination of caminar (walk), cross, and ochos. The beginning part of a figure, its starting-point, is called salida (exit or beginning – as in "beginning of a journey"). The end part of a figure is called resolución. Combination of the salida, a walk, the cross of the follower and the resolución is called basic step (paso basico, la base, salida simple).

Thus, an Argentine tango figure is the pattern of salida, combination of elements, and resolución. This makes for flexible, ever-changing patterns. It gives leader an exceptional opportunity to improvise, and in part makes the Argentine tango unique in the dance world.

=== Salidas ===
Spanish	English	Description – Salidas	Image
Salida simple	Parallel system salida	Beginning with strong contra body position of the upper torso and the leader's right leg outside the follow (in position 3 of the basic step).	
Salida cruzada	Cross system salida	Beginning with the leader's left leg outside the follow (in position 3 of the basic step).	
	Syncopated salida	Position 4 and 5 of the basic eight is done to the side.	
Salida Americana	Salida Americana	Lead initiating walk (called promenade) of the two dancers facing in the same direction.	

== Technique and embellishments ==
=== Follower's technique and embellishments ===
As in many dances most spectators focus on the follower – her elegance, grace, music interpretation as well as technique. Even though these are highly individual attributes there are some accepted ideas of what makes a follower graceful and beautiful when dancing tango. Such skills include leg projection and weight transfer, stability in movements, elegance in leg placement and leg extension, pivoting, embellishments, as well as expression of emotions.

Spanish	English	Description – Follower's technique	Image	Image	Image
Amagues	Amagues	A kick by one foot across in front of the other. May be very small or high.			
Caricias	Caresses	Term describing caress like rubbing thigh, calf, or foot down the follower's body or leader's leg			
Pasada	Pasada	Stepping over the leader's foot in an elegant way. Depending on the follower's preferences they can do variations such as lustrada; they can raise her leg high or keep it low.			
	Forward cross step	Forward step with one leg crossing in front of the other leg. The movement begins with leg projection and turning of a foot towards the direction of the pivot, transfer of weight to active foot, pivot. This sequence is part of the forward ocho.			
	Backward cross step	Back step with one leg crossing in the back of the other leg.			
	Side step transition	The movement begins with leg projection to the side with foot on the floor and slightly turned with subsequent transfer of weigh to active foot, collection. This sequence is part of the side step.			
Cuatro	Number four	The follower's adornment formed when they cross and raises their leg in front of the other leg.			
Lustrada	Polishing (shoe shine)	Rubbing shoe or foot up and down the partner's leg.			
Toque (see also golpecitos)	Touch	Short touch of the leader's instep by the follower's foot.			
Golpecito	Tap	Quick tap done between steps or during a pause.			

=== Leader's technique ===
Both partners can contribute to tango improvisations with adornments (sp. adornos, decoration) known also as decorations (sp. decoration). Adornments do not have to be led or marked. Several embellishments are: aguja, amague, boleo, caricia, cuatro, enroscar, golpecito, lustrada, rulo.

Spanish	English	Description – Leader's technique	Image
Agujas	Needle	Pointing foot towards the floor.	
Enrosque	Twist	Leader or follower is pivoting and twists his or her legs in corkscrew action. Often initiated with needle (aguja) position of a foot.	
Lapiz	Lapiz (pencil)	Leader is pivoting with his leg extended and foot and toes pointing towards floor.	
Planeo	Planeo	Pivoting on one leg with the other leg stretched out.	
	Taps	Quick taps done between steps or during a pause. Can be done by leader or follower.	

=== Expressions of emotion ===
Expression of emotions such as raising hand by a follower and gently lowering it on partner's shoulder; dancing with cheeks together.

Spanish	English	Description – Expressions of emotion	Image
	Cheek to cheek	Expression of emotion – dancing with cheeks together.	
	Arm up and down	Expression of emotion – raising hand by a follower and gently lowering it on partner's shoulder.	
	You are mine	Expression of emotion – gentle embrace.	
	Sweetheart embrace.	Expression of emotion – sweetheart embrace.	
	Forehead to forehead.	Expression of emotion – forehead to forehead.	

=== Variants and shape ===
Tango elements come in a variety of shapes determined by, for example, elasticity or flexion of the execution of movement. Such variants gives a figure a more modern or traditional look, it can be an expression of the follower's creativity, or simple adjustment to how crowded is the floor.

Many tango steps are often borrowed from tango shows, but modified for the tight spaces and flow of other dancers around the floor. Many of these steps are part of tango nuevo. The shape of the steps can vary – for example, how the follower's body is curved during the step may change according to her interpretation of the music or the moment. There are several instructional videos illustrating sequences of tango nuevo such as colgadas and volcadas with elements of traditional tango.

Spanish	English	Description – Examples of shape (variants)	Image	Image	Image
Colgada	Colgada shapes	Variants of colgadas shape – hip under, straight, and exaggerated "hip under".			
Voleo	Boleo shapes	Variants of boleo shape; low and high boleo; linear and circular boleo			

== Figures ==
=== Cross and ocho ===
Large group of classic and elegant tango figures is related to two basic steps: forward cross step and backward cross step. Their combinations form cruce (cross), ochos (figure eight), as well as giros (turns).

Spanish	English	Description – Cross and Ocho	Image
Cruce (cinco)	Cross (regular cross, position five)	Crossed left foot in front of the right foot. See also Position 5.	
Cruce adelante	Front cross	Crossed one leg in front of the other	see cross
Cruce atrás	Back cross	Crossed one leg in back of the other	see cross
Cruce forzado	Forced cross	Crossed legs – induced by the lead.	
Ocho	Ocho	A figure "eight" traced on the floor by the follower's feet.	See back ocho and forward ocho.
Ocho adelante	Forward ocho (front ocho)	Feet tracing a figure "eight" on the floor by the follower's feet when she walks forward.	Two forward cross steps.
Ocho atrás	Back ocho	Feet tracing a figure "eight" on the floor by the follower's feet when she walks back.	Two backward cross steps.
Ocho cortado	Cut ocho	Sudden change of direction leading the follower to cross during her forward walk.	
Ocho milonguero	Non-pivot ocho (lazy ocho)	Ochos led and followed without substantial torso and hip pivoting.	

=== Circular movements ===
Circular movements are inherent part of tango and have special importance in tango vals. These include

Spanish	English	Description – Circular movements	Image
Arroje	Push	Pushing follower away before leading giro.	
Calesita	Carousel	Circular movement in which the leader pivots the follower around.	
Giro	Turn	Giro is a turning step of the follower around the leader's axis (called the molinete). A common name for this figure is the "grapevine", alternating front and back steps connected by a side step. It is composed of several steps which complete a circle. One of the most common variants is composed of 4 steps (forward step, open step, back step, open step). Sequence of giro steps can follow square or be executed in circular motion (vals). Variants may include just 3 steps around the leader.	
Giro	Turn (open step)	Open step.	
Giro	Turn (back step)	Back step.	
Giro	Turn (open step)	Open step.	
Media Luna	A half giro (half moon)	180 degree part of giro.	see giro
Media Vuelta	A half turn	180 turn.	see giro
Molinete	Molinete	The molinete translates as "mill" and it is the part of the mill in the center, the axis. In tango, it is the leader's step, accompanying the follower's giro or grapevine (see giro). In the molinete, the leader pivots on ball of their foot, so that the foot stays behind the body and the follower stays close. The leader may either pivot on one foot or two feet or alternate feet in time to the music, while staying on the ball of foot.	see giro
Vueltas	Vueltas	Circular movements such as "marionette" (but not giro).	

=== Foot play ===
Steps related to foot play steps spice up the walk and the dance. These are ways for leaders and followers to challenge and tease their partners and make dance more playful. There are different shapes of these moves and their look depends on how crowded the venue is or the follower's interpretation of the lead.

Spanish	English	Description – Foot play	Image	Image
	Traps, catches	Leg traps		
Barrida (arrastre)	Dragging	One partner sweeps the others foot by displacing it along the floor.		
Bicicleta	Pedaling	Movement which resembles pedaling on a bicycle. Induced by the leader placing his foot under or to the side of the follower's foot and lifting and lowering it.		
Empujadita	Small push	Displacement of the follower's leg by the leader's leg.		
Mordida (sandwich, sanguche, sanguchito)	Sandwich	The leader places both feet on either side of the follow foot		
Parada	Parada (stop)	The leader halts the motion of the follower's turning by placing his foot close to her foot.		

=== Sacada and entrada ===
Spanish	English	Description – Sacada and entradas)	Image	Image
Sacada (entrada)	Shallow sacada (sacada, insert)	Leader's leg replaces partner's unweighted leg position. Entrada doesn't influence movement of the follower's leg. This movement is called entrada or sacada in Spanish depending on instructor.		
Sacada (quite)	Deep sacada (sacada)	Displacement of partner's unweighted leg.		
Sacada	Back sacada	Displacement of partner's unweighted leg.		

=== Gancho and enganche ===
Spanish	English	Description – Leg kicks and leg wraps (gancho and enganche)	Image	Image
Enganche	Leg wrap	One or both dancers wrap his or her leg around their partner's leg. This wrapping is often sustained or frozen for a moment in time. See also gancho and high leg wrap.		
Gancho	Gancho (hook)	One dancer hooks her or his leg around their partner's leg. See also enganche.		
	Overturned gancho (gancho nuevo)	The follower places her leg between the leader's legs. This move can be led from overturned back ocho. See also enganche.		
Piernazo	High leg wrap	Wrap or caress by follower's leg raised up high and touching the partner's waist or legs		

=== Boleos ===
Spanish	English	Description – Boleo	Image	Image
Voleo adelante	Front boleo	Sharp movement of the leg often interrupted or suspended. The follower lifts their foot from the floor and it flies to the side and wraps around their standing leg in front of their knee; boleos can be high (alto) or low (bajo). This move is alternatively named boleo and voleo in Spanish.		
Voleo atrás	Back boleo	Sharp movement of the leg often interrupted or suspended initiated typically from a back ocho. The follower's foot lifts from the floor and it flies to the side and wraps around their standing leg at the back of the knee. This move is alternatively named boleo and voleo in Spanish.		
Voleo en linea	Linear voleo	Linear movement resulting in the leg's suspension in the air at the back of (typically) her body.		

=== Colgada and volcada ===
Spanish	English	Description – Colgada and volcada	Image	Image
Colgada	Colgada ("hanging")	Off-axis move in which the follower leans back while being supported by the leader's arms. Simple colgadas can be executed during the follower's step over the leader's foot. For variants see colgada shapes: hip-under colgada (picture on the left) describes colgada with the follower's hips under their rib cage; plank or straight colgada (picture on the right) is when the back tilt is without pronounced bend.		
Colgada	Step over colgada	Off-axis move in which the follower leans back while being supported by the leader's arms. Simple colgadas can be executed during the follower's step over the leader's foot.		
Colgada	Side colgada	Off-axis move in which the follower leans to the side while being supported by the leader's arms.		
Volcada	Volcada	Off-axis move in which the follower leans forward and does forward or back cross or decorative figures with their legs. Volcadas can be done in open and close embrace. In case of closed embrace the follower is supported by the leader's torso. In open embrace the leader's arm provides support for the suspension. See also apile.		
	Volcada (suspended)	Off-axis move in which the follower leans forward and their legs are opened and extended.		
Volcada con adorno	Side volcada	Off-axis move in which the follower leans forward to the leader's side. The follower can do decorations with their leg.		
Volcada	"Armpit" volcada	Off-axis move in which the follower leans forward to the leader's side.		

=== Everything else ===
Spanish	English	Description – Everything else	Image	Image
Corrida	Run	A short sequence of steps.		
Doble frente	Moving together in one direction.	The follower is in front of the leader (see tango al reves style).		
Elevacion	Lifts	Lifts		
Espejo	Mirror step	Mirror steps or embellishments done by both the leader and the follower.		
Friccion	Pulling	Pulling the follower typically dragged on their toes.		
Pulpeadas	Leg entanglements, "sticky sacadas"	Class of trapped sacadas, wrapped sacadas, and carried (sp. llevada) ganchos. Named after Norberto Esbrez.		
Quebrada	Quebrada	Figure in which there is a sudden body twist or jerky move. The name is also associated with the tango style without embellishments (sudden breaks), as opposed to corte.		
Palanca	Lever	Leader helping the follower to jump or lift.		
Patada	Kick	Kick between legs (by leader or follower).		
Rebotes	Switch step (bounce)	Change of direction, bounce. For example, after salida americana partners step forward and change direction to step back.		
Salto, Saltitos	Jump, Small jump	Jump or small leaps or jumps		
Sentada	Sentada	The follower sits on the leader's lap, hip, bended leg.		
Tijera	Scissors	Small jump with scissoring step in between partner's legs.		
Soltada	Soltada	Breaking embrace to execute a figure (such as a turn) on her or his own.		
Zarandeo	Swing	Hip swings. Pivoting in place.		
	"Feet walking"	Walking on his feet.		

=== Ending figures ===
The most typical endings of tango are simple positions, for example "sandwich" or "tango close". However, in the popular culture tango endings are often associated with more dramatic figures such as listed below.

Spanish	English	Description – Finale	Image	Image
	Open legs	Dramatic final ending figure of tango with the follower's open legs.		
Corte	Bow (break, cut, stop)	Bow or break in the movements. Corte has also meaning of tango with embellishments as opposed to tango without them (see quebrada).		
