= Sacada =

Sacada may refer to:

- Sacada (moth), a genus of moths
- Sacada, a technique in Argentine tango
- South African Chamber for Agricultural Development in Africa (SACADA)
- Sacadas, Philippine plantation workers
