= Homer Ladas =

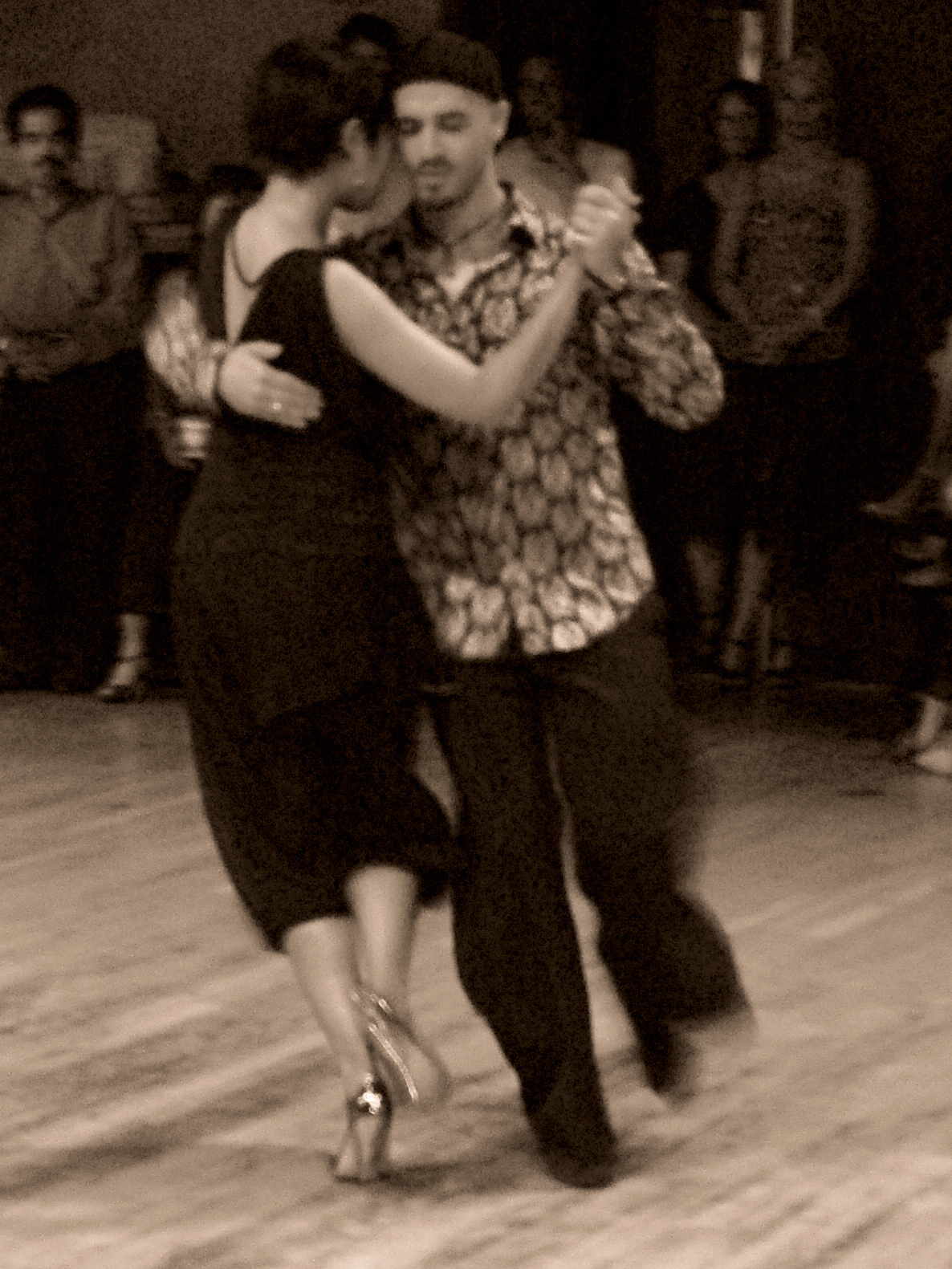
Homer Ladas and Cristina Navarro-Ladas dance tango at Santa Cruz in 2007.

Homer Ladas (born 1969) is a contemporary US argentine tango dancer and teacher.

Homer Ladas is a personality of tango and nuevo in the US. He began dancing tango in 1997 and has taught tango since 1999. His dance style has been influenced by, among others, Gustavo Naveira. Since 2001 he has been dancing with his wife Cristina Ladas (br. January 4, 1973); they were married in 2002. Her tango teachers have included Graciela Gonzalez, Luciana Valle, Guillermina Quiroga. She has danced tango since 1998. Homer and Christina provide a series of original tango instructional videos on YouTube taken at the end of their classes occasionally accompanied with written notes. In 2012 during the New Earth festival in Prague, Homer played his first bandoneon solo and Christina performed aerial silk.

== See also ==
- Figures of Argentine tango
