= Practica (event) =

A práctica (a practice session) is an informal event where Argentine tango, Salsa or Bachata is danced. Prácticas are often held regularly (often weekly), in a dance studio or exercise space, ideally with full-length mirrors so the dancers can observe themselves.

The main focus of a práctica is on practicing the dance, techniques, and improvisation. Participants may practise alone, focussing on their own conditioning, or in pairs, doing the usual leading-following sequences.

A trainer is optional in a práctica. If a trainer is present, the trainer may lead the dance figures for the dancers. A trainer may also circulate among the dancers to make corrections in a dancer's form or answer questions. This may be called a guided práctica.

Although a Milonga is also an event for dancing Argentine tango, there are several differences:

- Dancers go to the milonga to socialise, so dress code is more formal or party-like.
- Halls for milongas are bigger, with part of the area allotted for seats and tables.
- There are strict rules about how the music is arranged in curated sets of tandas and broken up by cortinas.

These format and customs of the milonga come from the customs in Argentina.

Some organisers may combine the práctica and milonga into one event and call it práctilonga.
