= Armen Babakhanian =

Armenian pianist

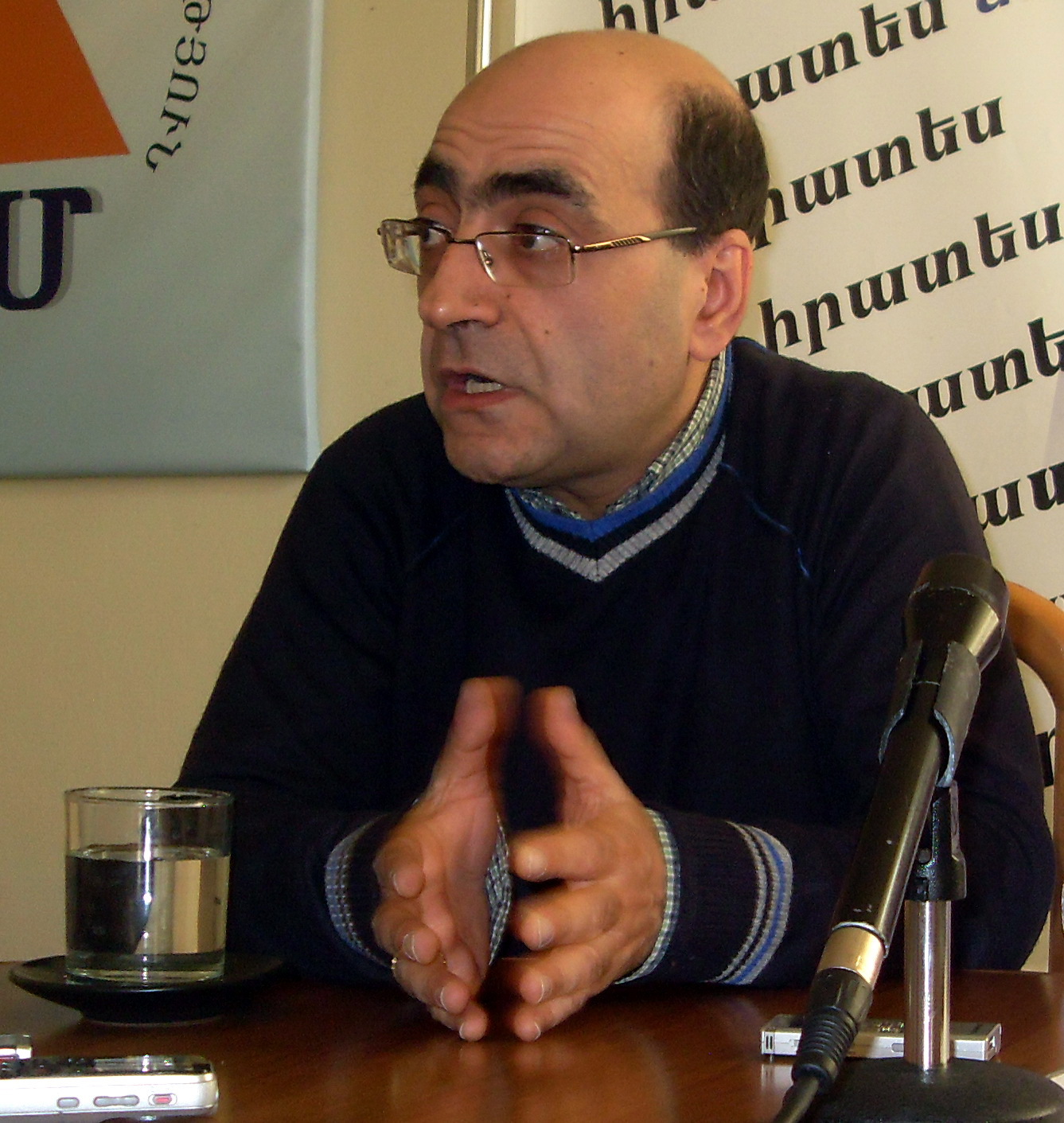
- Armen Babakhanian

Background information
- Born: 9 October 1967 (age 58); Yerevan, Armenian SSR, Soviet Union
- Genres: Classical music
- Occupation: Pianist
- Instrument: Piano
- Labels: ASV Records; Real Sound; Signum Classics

Armen Babakhanian (Armenian: Արմեն Բաբախանյան; born 9 October 1967) is an Armenian classical pianist. He has received prizes at various international piano competitions including the Leeds (5th prize), Van Cliburn (5th prize), Gina Bachauer (2nd prize), Guardian Dublin, William Kapell and World Piano Competition. Further, he has given recitals in the USA, Canada, Japan, the United Kingdom, Germany, Austria, Italy, France and Spain.

== Career ==
Babakhanian studied at the Yerevan Komitas State Conservatory, where he received his musical education under Professor Anahit Bogdanyan. He later continued his studies under the guidance of Claude Frank and Vera Gornostayeva.

In February 2004, Babakhanian was a founding member of the Cadence Ensemble, notable for performing the music of famous Argentine nuevo tango composer Astor Piazzolla.

He has appeared as soloist with various orchestras worldwide, including the City of Birmingham Symphony Orchestra under Sir Simon Rattle, Royal Philharmonic Orchestra, Royal Scottish National Orchestra, Irish National Symphony, National Symphony Orchestra, Dallas Symphony, Utah Symphony, with Saint Petersburg Philharmonic Orchestra under Yuri Temirkanov, with Moscow Philharmonic Orchestra under Valery Gergiev, Russian Philharmonic Orchestra under Yurovsky, Slovenian Philharmonic Orchestra and Israel Philharmonic Orchestra among others.

Babakhanian has appeared at music festivals in Aspen, Interlochen and Baalbeck, while also earning recognition for his chamber music performance with the Takács Quartet at the XIII Paloma O'Shea International Piano Competition. Babakhanian has recorded for ASV Records, Real Sound and Signum Classics. His performances have been broadcast on BBC, PBS, ORF and RAI television networks.

In addition to his performing career, Babakhanian has served as jury member for international piano competitions and taught masterclasses in Russia, the United Kingdom, Spain, Japan, China, Iceland and the United States.

In 2008, Babakhanian was awarded the Gold Medal by the Ministry of Culture for "Strengthening Cultural Ties Between Armenia and the Diaspora". In 2009, he was awarded the title Artist Emeritus by the President of the Republic of Armenia.

Babakhanian also served as professor at the Komitas State Conservatory in Yerevan. In 2012, he became Dean of the Piano Department at the Yerevan State Conservatory.

== Discography ==
- Babadjanyan: Heroic Ballade & Nocturne; Tjeknavorian: Piano Concerto - with Armenian Philharmonic Orchestra under Loris Tjeknavorian, ASV Records, 1998.
- Discovering Composer Stephan Elmas - with Armenian Philharmonic Orchestra under Alexandre Siranossian, N.A.B Productions, 2000.
- Pyotr Ilyich Tchaikovsky, Piano Sonata In C Sharp Minor Op.80, Grand Sonata In G Major Op.37 - Real Sound, 2001.
- Sayat Nova - Arrangements for Piano, Hamazkayin, 2005.
- Komitas - Piano Works, Hamazkayin, 2006.
- Aram Khachaturian - Solo Piano Works, Hamazkayin, 2007. Winner of Best Classical Album - Armenian Music Awards, 2007.
- Espressia - Tangos & Fantasies - with Cadence Ensemble, Signum Classics, 2007.
- Espressia - Armenian Metamorphoses - with Cadence Ensemble, Signum Classics, 2007.
- Anthology of Armenian Piano Music, Volume 1 - TM Production, 2012.
