= Carlos Espinoza =

Carlos Espinoza may refer to:

- Carlos Espinoza (cyclist) (born 1951), Peruvian cyclist
- Carlos Espinoza (dancer) (born 1981), Argentine dancer
- Carlos Espinoza (footballer, born 1928), Chilean footballer
- Carlos Espinoza (footballer, born 1985), Chilean footballer

== See also ==
- Carlos Espinosa (born 1982), Chilean footballer
- Carlos Espinosa de los Monteros y Bernaldo de Quirós (1944–2026), Spanish peer, business executive and civil servant
