= Tangocrisis =

- Origin: Buenos Aires, Argentina
- Genres: alternative rock, art rock, Tango music, electronic music, jazz rock, soul music
- Years active: 1999–2004 / 2010-present
- Label: Constitution Music
- Members: Max Masri; Diego S. Velázquez; Aldo Di Paolo; Fernando Santodomingo; Ezequiel Sottile
- Website: www.tangocrisis.com

Tangocrisis, previously known as 020 (or zero2zero) is an Argentine rock / pop / fusion band from Buenos Aires, and one of very few to introduce tango elements in a rock context. The project was conceived as 020 in early 1999 by producer and composer Max Masri and composer and guitarist Diego S. Velázquez. .

020 released a full studio album in 2002 named End of Illusions. According to several interviews gave by Max and Diego, the band is being reformed with the name Tangocrisis after a 7-year long hiatus, primarily due to Tanghetto's touring and recording .

== End of Illusions ==
In 2001 Masri and Velázquez recruited several musicians to produce the band's debut album and to start performing live. The result of 11 months of recording sessions was the concept album End of Illusions, released in December 2002. The underlying concept of the release was the Argentine crisis of 2001-2002.

In spite of early commercial success, the band disbanded due primarily to lack of support from the very members of the group, who became heavily involved with (then) side project Tanghetto, the album drew the attention of many journalists and music critics of Argentina and other South American countries for its blend of art rock and tango nuevo and its lyrical content focused in social commentary and criticism of negatively perceived mass behaviours and group thinking.

In different interviews 020 / Tangocrisis acknowledged several influences within and outside the music industry in their lyrical content, such as Pink Floyd, The Clash, Bob Marley, Erich Fromm, Aldous Huxley and George Orwell.

020 is known for having played live just on few occasions, during 2003 and 2004.

== Reforming in 2010 as Tangocrisis ==
In several interviews given by Max Masri in 2010 and 2011 he mentioned the fact that 020 was to reform. The name chosen for the reunion is Tangocrisis (after Tanghetto's song, the latter named after the 2001 crisis). However, the titles of new songs and a certain date for release of new material are still undisclosed. According to Max Masri, the new album will be "even more rock-oriented and song-oriented than End of Illusions, still keeping the tango features that made up the personality and, somehow, uniqueness of the band". The new album would be released someday.

== Discography ==
- End of Illusions (2002)
- TBA (2012)
