= Fugata Quintet =

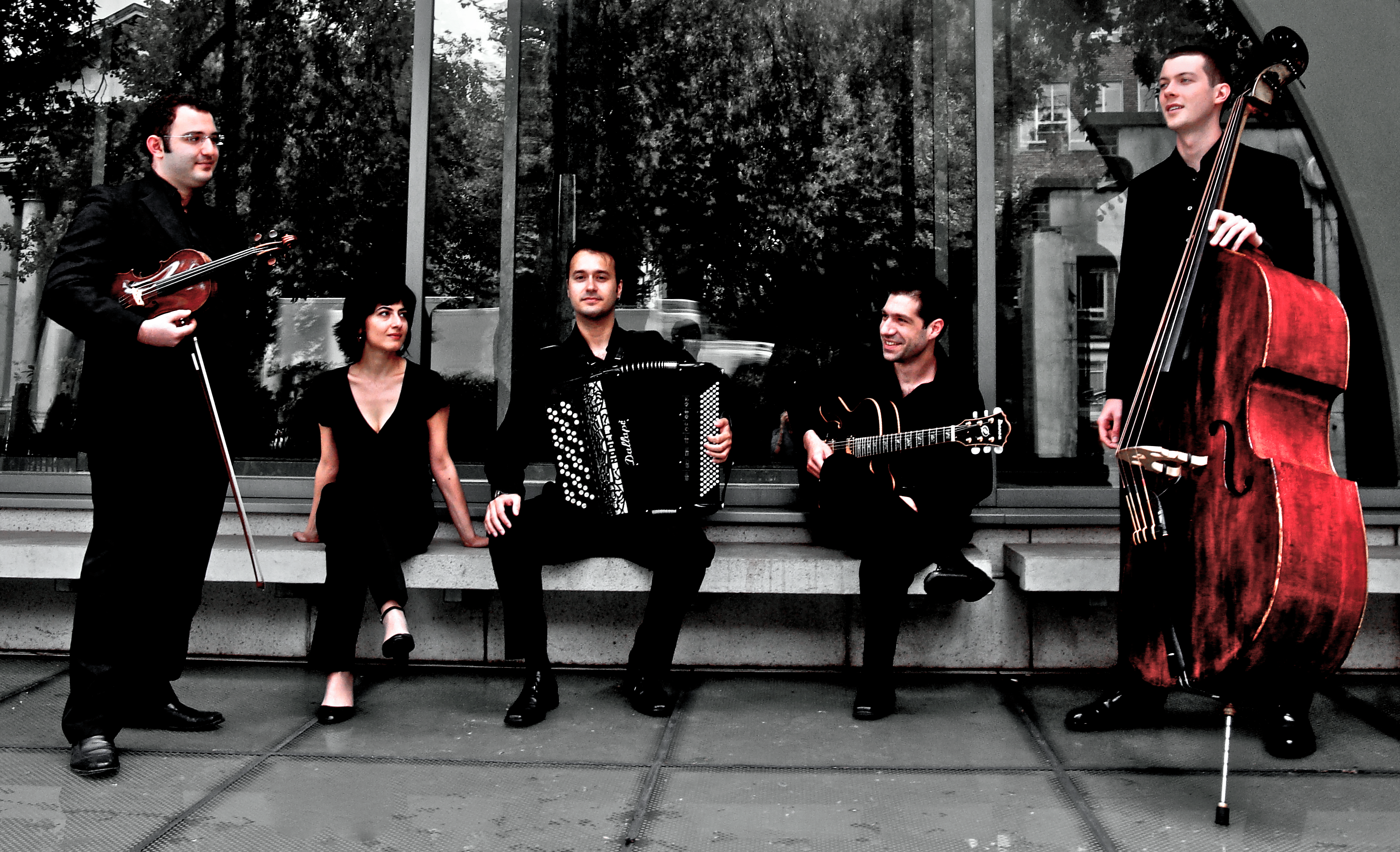

Background information
- Origin: London, England
- Genres: Nuevo Tango, Classical
- Years active: 2007 - present
- Labels: Unsigned
- Members: Živorad Nikolić (accordion); Anastasios Mavroudis (violin); Antonis Hatzinikolaou (el. guitar); Anahit Chaushyan (piano); James Opstad (double bass)
- Past members: Christopher Bundhun
- Website: Official website

Fugata Quintet is a London based chamber group formed in early 2007 at the Royal Academy of Music, where all quintet members were studying at the time. Fugata principally perform Nuevo Tango music by the Argentine composer Ástor Piazzolla. The quintet is one of the few independent groups to have produced and performed a fully staged production of Maria de Buenos Aires, the Tango Operita by Ástor Piazzolla and Horacio Ferrer. The group's name is an homage to Piazzolla's composition Fugata from the Nuevo Tango Suite Tangata Silfo y Ondina. The current quintet members are: Živorad Nikolić (accordion), Anastasios Mavroudis (violin), Antonis Hatzinikolaou (electric guitar), Anahit Chaushyan (piano), James Opstad (double bass).
