= Mariano Frúmboli =

Argentine tango dancer

Mariano 'Chicho' Frúmboli
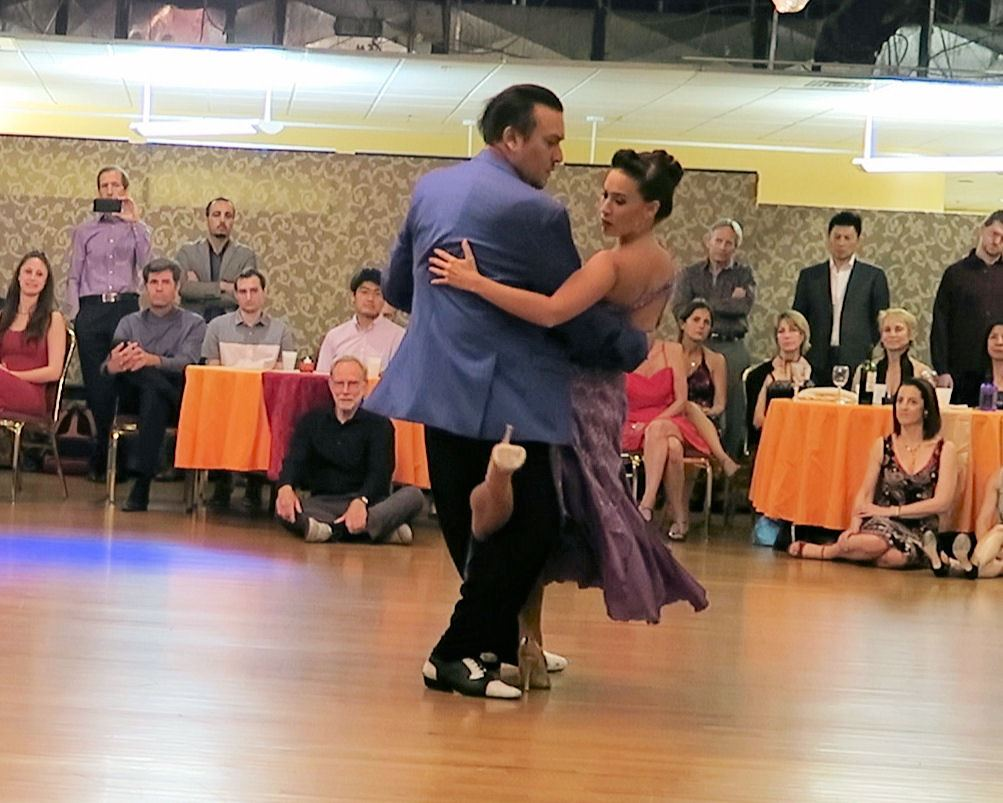
- Frúmboli with his partner Juana Sepúlveda in 2016
- Born: 21 September 1970 (age 56); Buenos Aires, Argentina
- Occupation: Tango dancer

Mariano "Chicho" Frúmboli (born 21 September 1970) is an Argentine tango dancer. He is regarded as one of the founders of tango nuevo.

== Early life ==
Frúmboli's father was a teacher of fine arts and studied guitar. He began studying music at the age of 13. He studied in the "David Lebón Music School" in Buenos Aires as a drum player. He played the drums for 14 years and studied theater for 8 years prior to beginning his tango career. From 1992 until 1998 he studied theater in Buenos Aires with Cristina Banegas.

== Career ==
Frúmboli began dancing tango in 1993. Two years later, he started dancing with Victoria Vieyra and then with Teté Rusconi. Victoria took him to Gustavo Naveira's and Fabián Salas's training group.

Between 1994 and 1998 he studied with the masters Ricardo Barrios and Victoria Vieyra. He then followed other famous teachers, including: Luis Solanas and Cecilia Troncoso, Carla Marano, Tete and Maria, Alejandro Suaya and Elina Roldan, Graciela Gonzales and Patricia Lamberti, Julio Balmaceda and Valencia Batik. During this period he performed alongside Victoria Vieyra, Eugenia Ramirez and Claudia Jacobsen. Following continued to study with Gustavo Naveira and Fabián Salas. In October 1998, along with Victoria Vieyra, Frúmboli arrived in Europe. He settled first in France and then in Belgium where he presented and taught tango nuevo.

Frúmboli first partnered with a dancer named Laura. Shortly after, in 1999, he started performing with Lucía Mazer with whom he worked for the next 4 years. Frúmboli has called this period the most creative of his career.

After ending his professional and personal relationships with Lucia, he partnered with Eugenia Parrilla from 2003 until 2006. In an interview he called these years his most "artistic years".

Currently he tours and performs with Juana Sepúlveda, a partnership since 2007. Frúmboli performed live with tango orchestras and neotango groups such as Gotan Project, Tanghetto and Narcotango. Since 2009, Chicho and Juana teach and perform at the annual Tango Element Festival in Baltimore, United States.

== Filmography ==
- Tango libre (2012)
- Fermín glorias del tango (2014)

== Video clips ==
- Tango Ritual" (2007)
- Tango Arte (2003)
- Tango Element 2013 (2013)
- Tango Element 2013 (2013)
- Tango Element 2012 (2012)
- Tango Element 2010 (2010)
- ARCOS - by Jelly Films (2017)
