= Lucía Mazer =

Argentine dancer of Argentine tango (born 1978)

- Born: 1978 (age 47–48); Argentine
- Occupation: Tango dancer

Lucía Mazer (born May 12, 1978 in Buenos Aires, Argentina) is an Argentine dancer of Argentine tango. She is regarded as one of the most influential partners of tango nuevo founder Mariano Frúmboli and as being one of the leaders of the first transformation of woman's role in tango.

== Career ==
She began dancing tango in 1996 at the "taller de extensión de tango danza de la universidad del tango" and soon she met Alejandra Arrue y Sergio Natario who became her strongest influence during her beginnings.

- She partnered with Fabián Salas from 1997 to 1999.
- With Mariano Frúmboli from 1999 to 2003 and later on they worked together during 2007
- During 2004 and 2005 she partnered with Ezequiel Fárfaro and they toured again during 2010.
- During 2011 and 2012 she worked with Gonzalo Orihuela.

== Personal life ==
She lives in Patagonia and has kept a low profile since 2011 while taking care of her two children.

== Video clips ==
Tango Ritual "" (2007)

== External links / sources ==
- Interview in la Gazzetta Tango
- Article Tout Tango (2009)
- Video performing with Chicho Frumboli
- Personal Blog
- Article about Fabian Salas that mentions her (2009)

== Notes and references ==
^ Interview in Tango Australia magazine
