= Agriculture in South Africa =

Development of agricultural output of South Africa in 2015 US$ since 1961

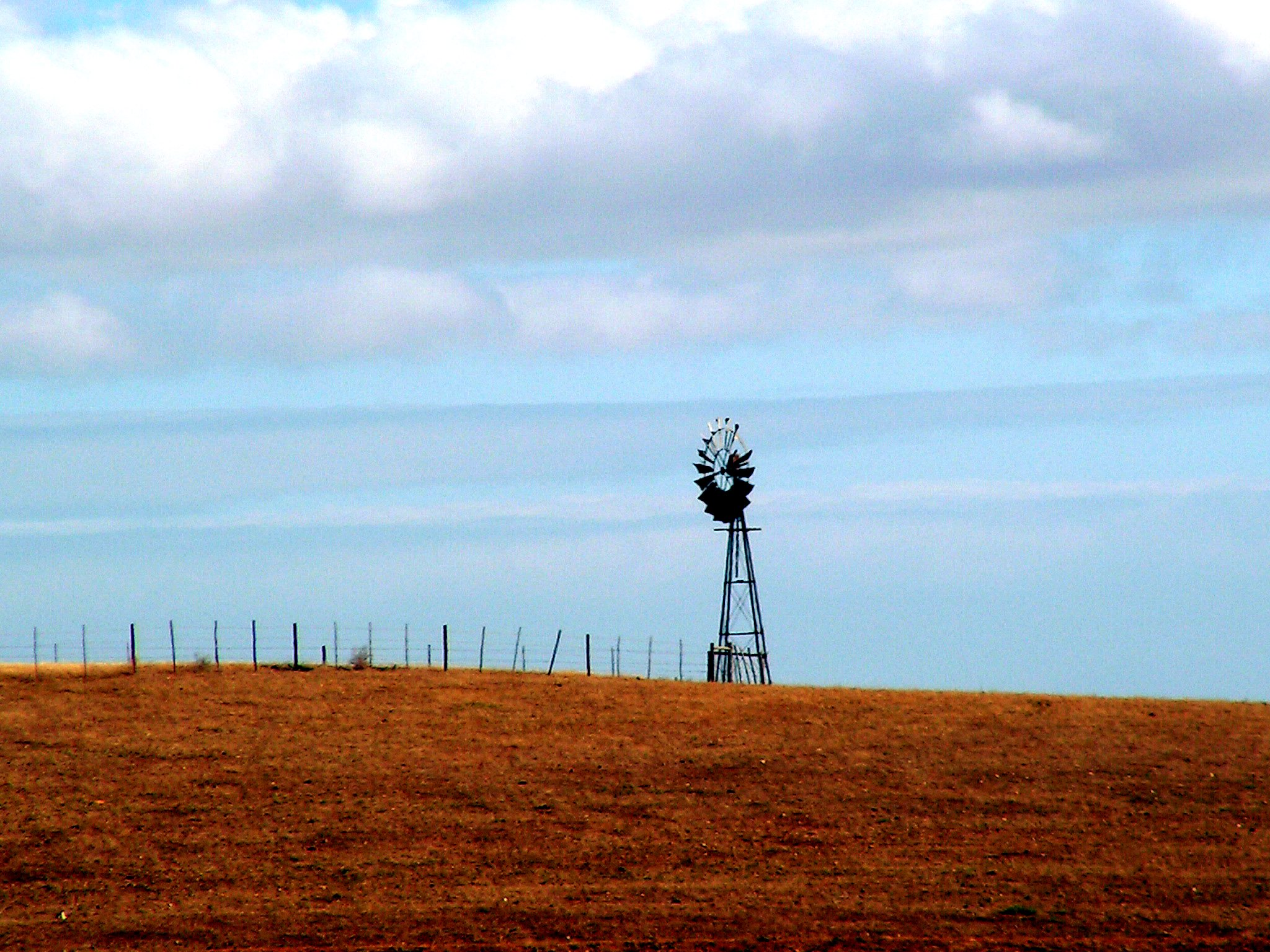
A windpump on a farm in South Africa.

Agriculture in South Africa contributes around 5% of formal employment, relatively low compared to other parts of Africa, and the number is still decreasing, as well as providing work for casual laborers and contributing around 2.8 percent of GDP for the nation. Due to the aridity of the land, only 13.5 percent can be used for crop production, and only 3 percent is considered high potential land.

According to FAOSTAT, South Africa is one of the world's largest producers of: chicory roots (4th); grapefruit (4th); cereals (5th); green maize and maize (7th); castor oil seed (9th); pears (9th); sisal (10th); fibre crops (10th). The dairy industry consists of around 4,300 milk producers providing employment for 60,000 farm workers and contributing to the livelihoods of around 40,000 others.

The South African government has set a target of transferring 30% of productive farmland to 'previously disadvantaged' black people by 2014. Land reform has been criticised both by farmers' groups and by landless workers, the latter alleging that the pace of change has not been fast enough, and the former alleging racist treatment and expressing concerns that a similar situation to Zimbabwe's land reform policy may develop, a fear exacerbated by comments made by former deputy president Phumzile Mlambo-Ngcuka.

On 27 February 2018, the National Assembly voted to set in motion a process to amend the Constitution so as to allow for the expropriation of land without compensation.

Some predictions show surface water supply could decrease by 60% by 2070 in parts of the Western Cape. To reverse the damage caused by land mismanagement, the government has supported a scheme which promotes sustainable development and the use of natural resources.

Maize production, which contributes to a 36% majority of the gross value of South Africa's field crops, has also experienced negative effects due to climate change. The estimated value of loss, which takes into consideration scenarios with and without the carbon dioxide fertilization effect, ranges between tens and hundreds of millions of Rands.

== History ==
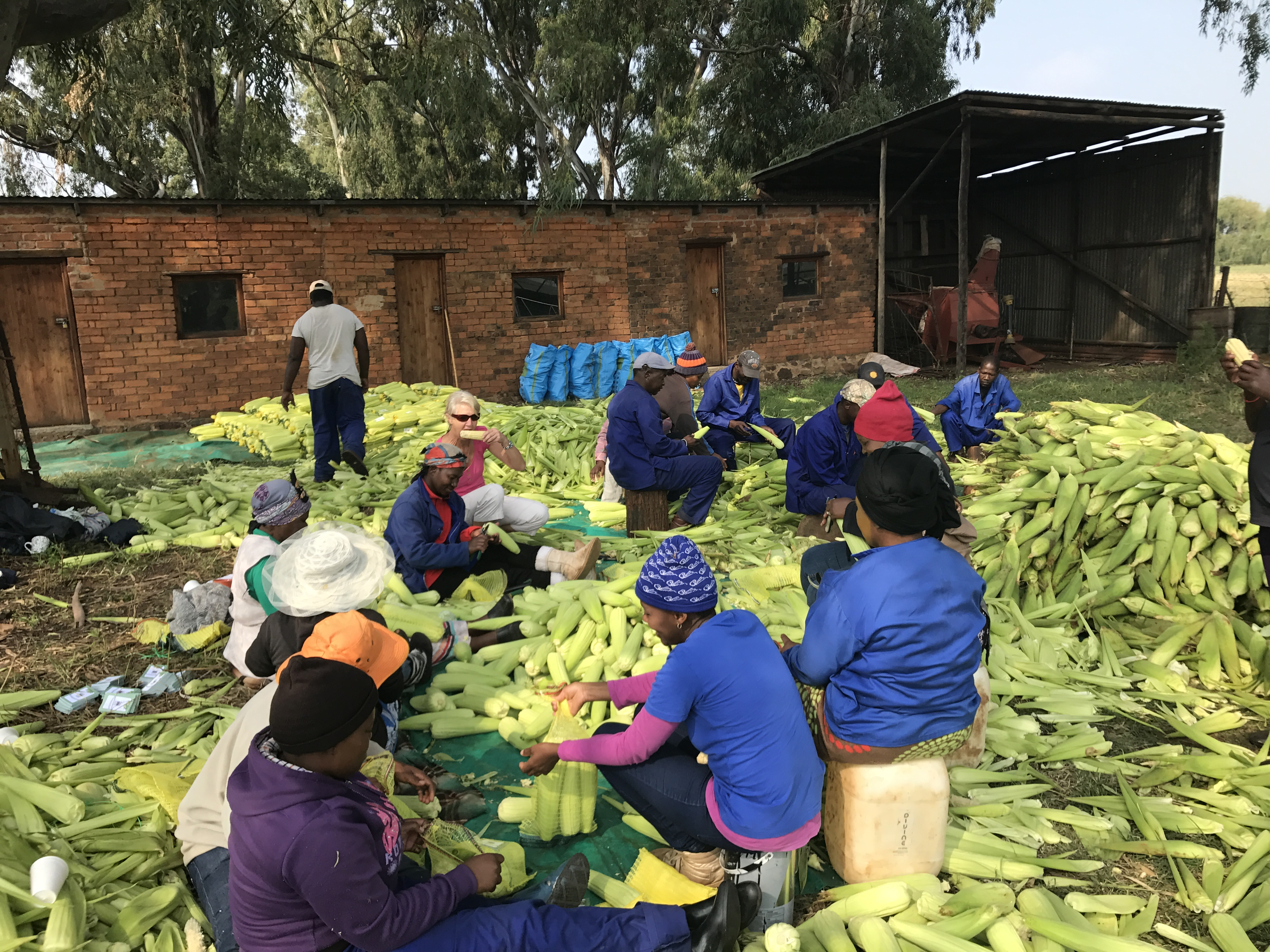
Cleaning and packing maize

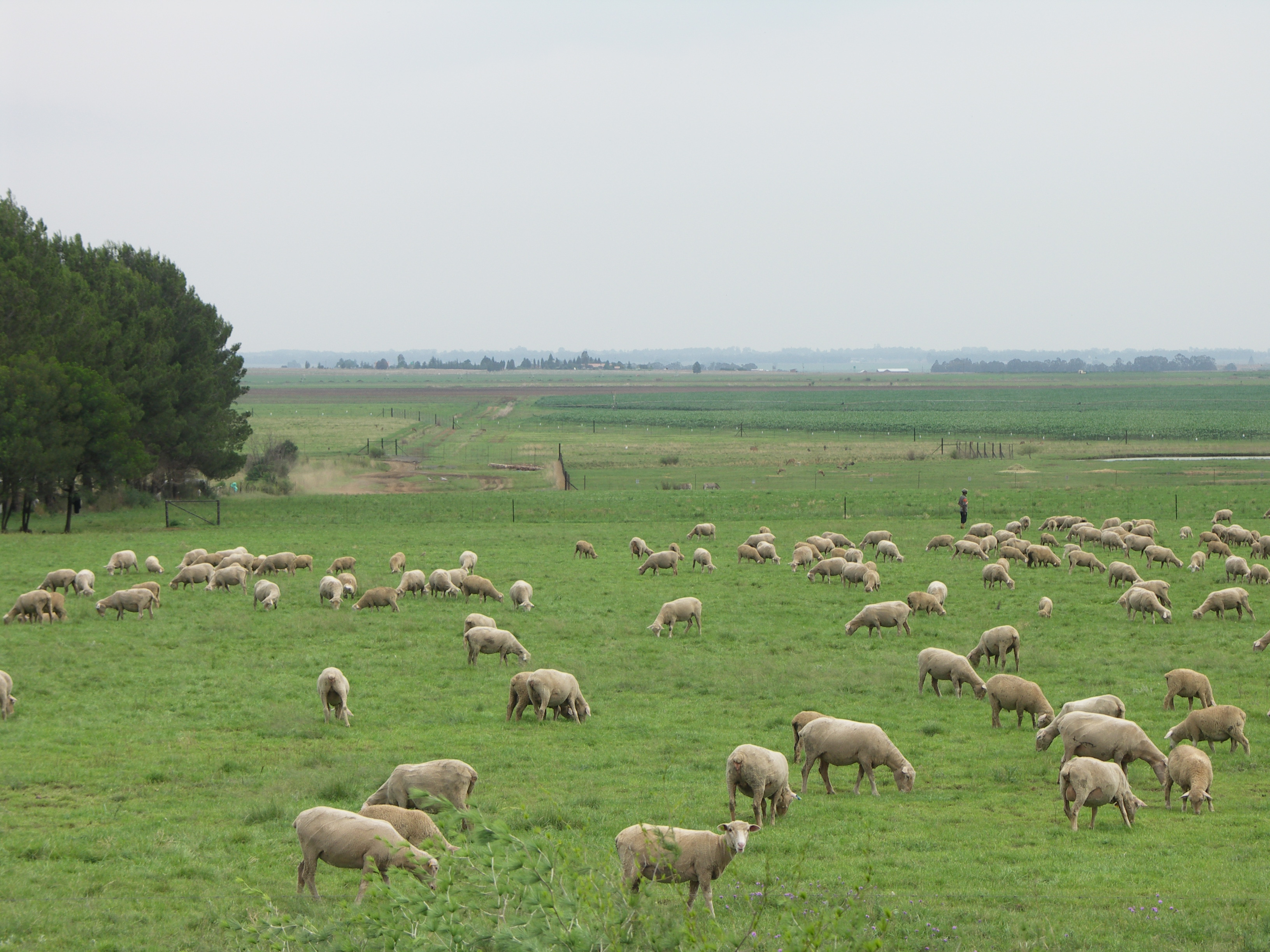
Sheep farming in Gauteng

Based on prehistorical archaeological evidence of pastoralism and farming in southern Africa, ancient settlements closest outside the present-day South African border region, related to Bantu language speaking peoples, so far was found in sites located in the southernmost region inside the borders of what is now Mozambique, and dated 354–68 BCE.

Findings similarly based on pastoralism and farming within South Africa thus far – is from sites identified in what was the Transvaal (province), they were dated 249–370 CE. The earliest written record of farming life in South Africa by Europeans starts slightly after 1500 CE.

== Production ==
In 2018, South Africa produced 19.3 million tonnes of sugarcane (14th largest producer in the world), 12.5 million tonnes of maize (12th largest producer in the world) 1.9 million tons of grape (11th largest producer in the world), 1.7 million tons of orange (11th largest producer in the world) and 397 thousand tons of pear (7th largest producer in the world).

In addition, in the same year, it produced 2.4 million tons of potato, 1.8 million tons of wheat, 1.5 million tons of soy, 862 thousand tons of sunflower seed, 829 thousand tons of apple, 726 thousand tons of onion, 537 thousand tons of tomato, 474 thousand tons of lemon, 445 thousand tons of grapefruit, 444 thousand tons of banana, 421 thousand tons of barley, in addition to smaller productions of other agricultural products, such as avocado, pineapple, peach, tangerine, pumpkin, cabbage, carrot, rapeseed, sorghum etc. Some of the produce is being exported to the rest of the world by import/ export companies in South Africa.

== Crops ==
=== Cereals and grains ===
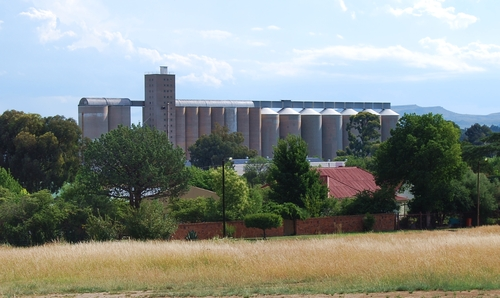
Grain elevator and silos in the Free State

Grains and cereals are South Africa's most important crops, occupying more than 60 percent of hectare under cultivation in the 1990s. Maize, the country's most important crop, is a dietary staple, a source of livestock feed, and an export crop. Government programs, including generous loans and extension services, have been crucial to the country's self-sufficiency in this enterprise. Maize is grown primarily in North-West, Mpumalanga, Free State, and KwaZulu-Natal provinces.

As of the mid-1990s, maize production generated at least 150,000 jobs in years with good rainfall and used almost one-half of the inputs of the modern agricultural sector. As of 2018, South Africa produced 12.5 million tonnes of maize.

Wheat production, which is concentrated in large, highly mechanised farms, increased after World War II. Wheat cultivation spread from the western Cape where rainfall is fairly reliable, to the Orange Free State and the eastern Transvaal, primarily in response to rising consumer demand. As of 2018, South Africa produced 1.8 million tonnes of wheat.

Other small grains are grown in localised areas of South Africa. For example, sorghum—which is native to southern Africa—is grown in parts of the Free State, as well as in the North-West and the Northern provinces, with yields often exceeding 200,000 tons as of the mid-1990s. Sorghum has been used since prehistoric times for food and brewing purposes. Barley is also grown, primarily in the Western Cape. In 2018, 421,000 tonnes of barley were produced.

South Africa also produces peanuts, sunflower seeds, beans, and soybeans.

=== Fruit and wine farming ===
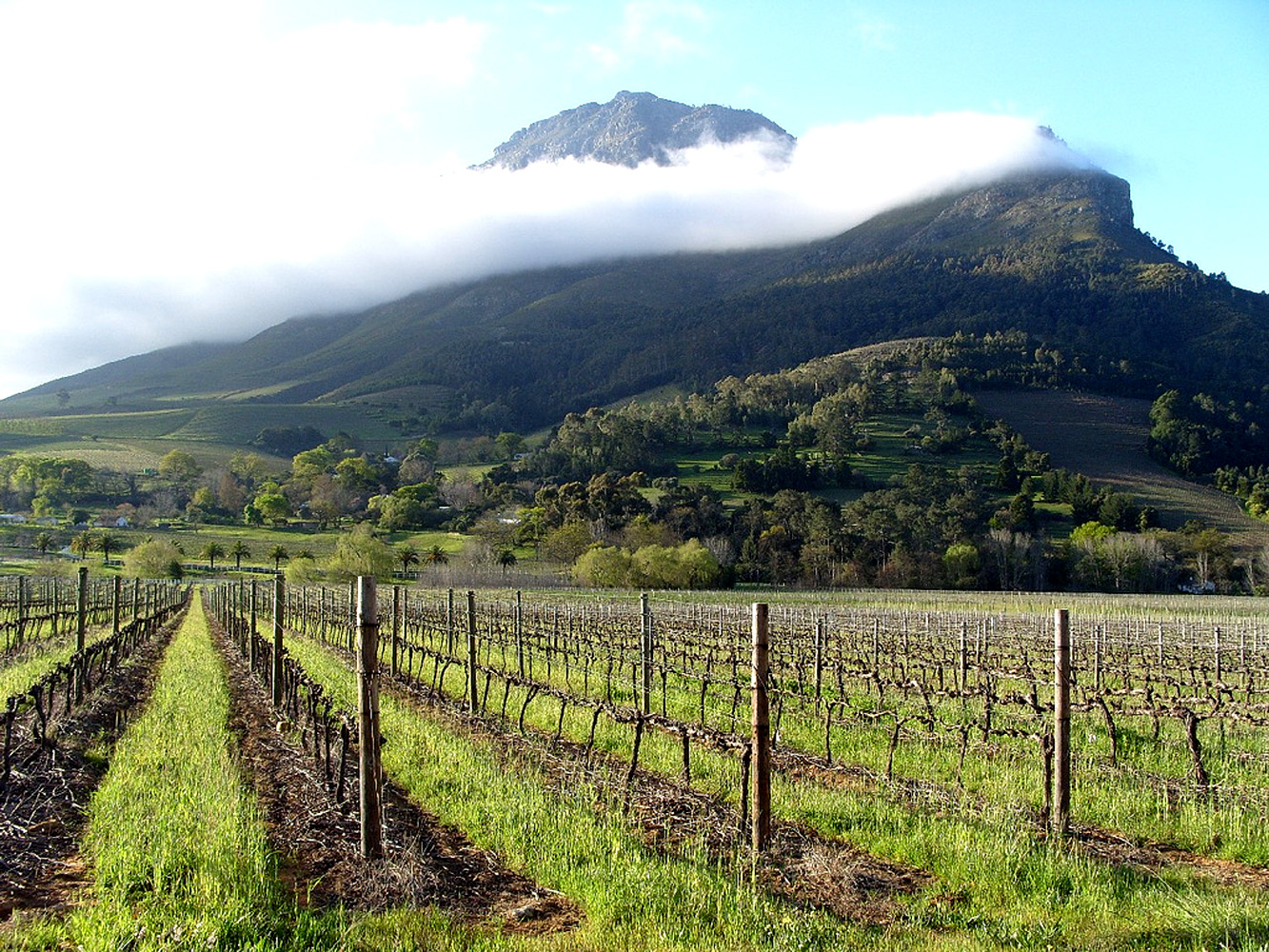
Vineyard in Stellenbosch

As of the mid-1990s, fruits (including grapes for wine) earned as much as 40 percent of agricultural export earnings in some years. (Fresh fruit finds a good market in Europe because it matures during the northern hemisphere's winter.) Deciduous fruits, including apples, pears, and peaches, are grown primarily in areas of the Western Cape and the Eastern Cape, where cold winters and dry summers provide ideal conditions for these crops. Almost 1 million tons of deciduous fruits were sold fresh locally or were exported each year in the early 1990s.

Pineapples are grown, primarily in the Eastern Cape and KwaZulu-Natal. Tropical fruits—especially bananas, avocados, and mangoes—are also grown, especially in the northeast and some coastal areas. More than half of citrus production is exported in most years.

As of the mid-1990s, more than 1.5 million tons of grapes were used domestically in South Africa's renowned wine industry, which dates back to the seventeenth-century vineyards introduced by French Huguenot immigrants. More than 100,000 hectares of land were planted in vineyards as of the mid-1990s, centred primarily in the Western Cape. Smaller vineyards are also found in the Northern Cape, Free State, and Northern Province.

=== Sugarcane ===
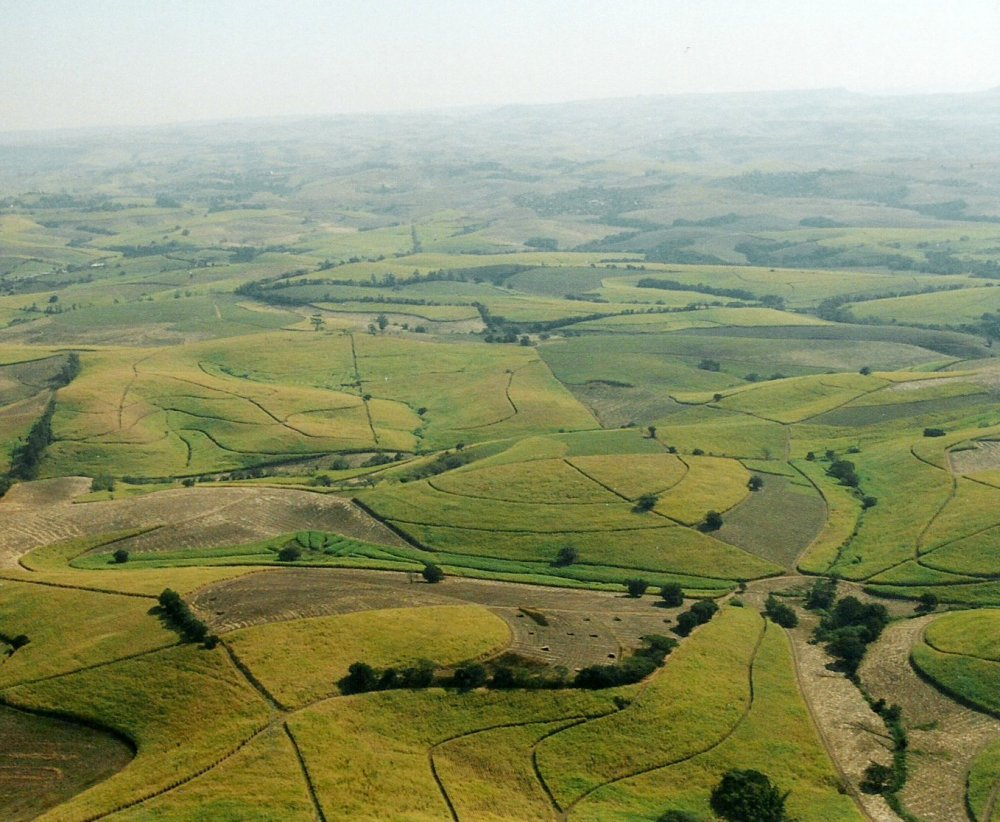
Sugar fields north of Durban in KwaZulu-Natal

Sugarcane is also an important export crop, and South Africa was the world's 14th largest sugar producer as of 2018. Sugarcane was first cultivated in mid-nineteenth-century Natal. Production is still centred there, but sugar is also grown in Mpumalanga, where irrigation is used when rainfall is inadequate. More than 19 million tons of sugarcane were produced in 2018.

=== Statistics ===
Value in millions of South African rand:

Commodity	2009
Poultry	23,165
Maize	16,346
Cattle and calves	12,808
Wheat	6,356
Milk	9,138
Deciduous and other fruit	8,040
Vegetables	7,843
Sugar cane	4,769
Citrus	4,628
Potato	4,058

Production of important field crops:

Commodity	2009 (tons)	2015 (fifth forecast) (tons)
Canola	40,350	101,500
Sugar cane	20,411,000	
Malting barley	216,000	357,487
Maize	12,567,000	
Vegetables	2,442,000	
Citrus	2,218,000	
Wheat	1,928,000	1,501,190
Deciduous and other fruit	1,829,000	
Sunflower seed	833,000	
Subtropical Fruit	655,000	

== Agricultural cooperatives ==
There are a number of Agricultural cooperatives in South Africa, including:

- KAL Group
- Sentraal-Suid Koöperasie
- Oos Vrystaat Kaap Kooperasie
- BKB Limited
- (VKB group) Vrystaat Kooperasie Beperk
- (NTK) Noord Transvaal Kooperasie
- Karakoel en Lewendehawe Koöp Beperk (KLK)
- Die Humansdorpse Koöperasie, trading as The Co-op
- Senwes
- NWK
- AFGRI

A lot of the cooperatives have changed with time in line with the changes in their individual business strategies.

== Challenges ==
=== Recurrent droughts ===
In 2015 South Africa experienced the worst drought in 30 years. Many farmers lost whole crops and much of their livestock. South Africa's dams also showed a decline with the Pongolapoort dam losing 20% of its water in just one year.

=== Land degradation ===
About 7.3 million hectares are directly affected by woody plant encroachment, with severe negative impacts for rangeland agriculture.

== See also ==
- Department of Agriculture (South Africa)
- South African Chamber for Agricultural Development in Africa
- Animal husbandry in South Africa
- South African farm attacks
- Western Cape 2012 Farm Workers' Strike
