= Practica =

Practica may refer to:

- Practica (event), a Latin American dance event
- Practica (astrology), a booklet of astrological predictions
- Practica Maria, an alchemical treatise by Mary the Jewess

== See also ==
- Praktica, a German brand of camera
- Practice (disambiguation)
- Practical
