= Cadence Ensemble =

Armenian musical ensemble

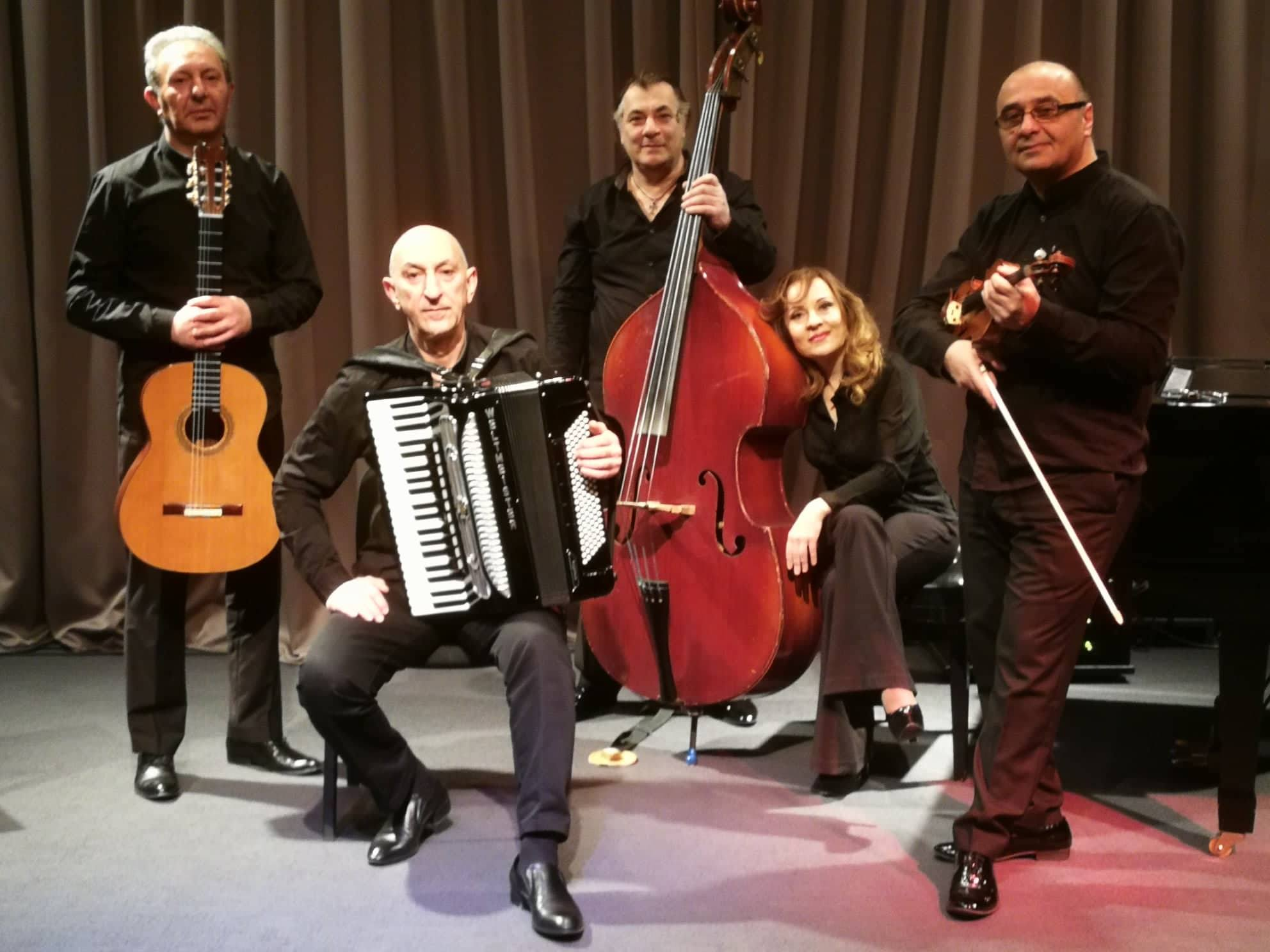

Background information
- Origin: Yerevan, Armenia
- Genres: nuevo tango, Classical music
- Years active: 2004–present
- Labels: Signum Records
- Members: Hakob Jaghatspanyan, guitar, Varazdat Khachumyan, violin, Meruzhan Yeganyan, accordion, Sofi Mikayelyan, piano, Gurgen Amiryan, double bass
- Past members: Armen Babakhanian

Cadence Ensemble is an Armenian musical ensemble formed in February 2004 in the country's capital Yerevan by five Armenian classically trained musicians. Initially specialising on works by Argentinian composer Astor Piazzolla, they later included a wider repertoire of American, Armenian, Russian and other European classical and contemporary music.

== History ==
Founded in 2004 under the musical direction of pianist Armen Babakhanian, Cadence Ensemble comprises five Armenian classically trained musicians who started performing works by Argentinian composer Astor Piazzolla (1921–1992). Their first concert was performed in April 2004 at the Aram Khachaturian Concert Hall in Armenia's capital city Yerevan. This successfully introduced Piazzolla's nuevo tango to local audiences and was followed by numerous further concerts in local and international concert halls.

The manager and founding member of Cadence Ensemble is Nika Babayan, a well-known promotor of musical culture in the Armenian Republic. As there was no bandoneon – an instrument closely associated with tango music – in the country at the time of the ensemble's foundation, they successfully replaced it with an accordion. When the ensemble later wanted to include compositions by modern Armenian and other composers, they expanded their repertoire to include Armenian, American, Russian and other European classical and contemporary music, while remaining close to Piazzolla's musical style. Further, the ensemble also have performed works dedicated to them.

In 2010, the Cadence Music Center and the Ministry of Culture founded the International Yerevan Tango Festival, with the ensemble performing interpretations of Argentine music in 2011 and the following years. Performances by international guest musicians included French composer and accordionist Richard Galliano, Argentine conductor Facundo Agutin with bandoneon player Marcelo Nisinman, and the Terem Quartet from Saint Petersburg, Russia. In 2013 and 2022, further editions of the festival presented Argentine composer and bandoneon player Walter Rios with singer Mariel Dupetit.

In 2020, Cadence Ensemble was featured by the Min-On Concert Association, a Japanese society for international musical cooperation, as part of their exchange with musicians of Armenia.

== Musicians ==
Over time, all original members but guitarist Hakob Jaghatspanyan have been replaced by other musicians, trained at the Yerevan State conservatory and other musical institutes. Since 2012, the ensemble comprises the following musicians:

- Hakob Jaghatspanyan, guitar
- Varazdat Khachumyan, violin
- Meruzhan Yeganyan, accordion
- Sofi Mikayelyan, piano
- Gurgen Amiryan, double bass

== Concert tours and albums ==
The first concert tour of the ensemble took place in April 2005, when Cadence Ensemble performed in Argentina at the famous Teatro Colon and Cervantes theaters in Buenos Aires. Their performance included compositions by Vivaldi, Shostakovich, Gershwin, Khachaturian, Komitas, Sayat Nova, as well as by Piazzolla and was released as a live recording. This first tour was followed by performances in numerous other countries and at international festivals.

On 28 November 2013, a performance of Cadence Ensemble took place in the concert hall of the Saint Petersburg Mariinsky Theatre in Russia, which was broadcast on the Mariinsky TV website. In 2014, Cadence participated in the celebration of the 300th anniversary of Armenian poet Sayat Nova in the capital city of Georgia, Tbilisi, and in the Cultural Days of Armenia in Israel. In 2019, Cadence Ensemble performed in Washington, D.C. sponsored by the Armenians Worldwide Association and the Embassy of the Republic of Armenia to the United States, with further concerts at Fresno and Las Vegas. On 19 October 2019, the ensemble participated in the opening of the new exhibition hall of the Arno Babajanian Concert Hall in Yerevan.

From 2005 until 2023, the ensemble has performed concerts on four continents, including Europe, North and South America, West and East Asia, as well as Egypt. Between 2004 and 2023, Cadence Ensemble have released numerous CDs and DVDs. Among others, the ensemble recorded two CDs at the Abbey Road Studios in London, both produced by Signum Classics (UK) and distributed by Hyperion Records.

== Recognitions and awards ==
Cadence Ensemble and its members have won a number of national Armenian and international awards:

- In 2008, their CD Expressia: Armenian Metamorphoses won the Pizzicato music magazine's Supersonic Award of Luxembourg.։
- In 2012, guitarist Hakob Jaghatspanyan was awarded the title of Honored Artist of the Republic of Armenia.
- In 2012, violinist Varazdat Khachumyan was awarded the Movses Khorenatsi medal.
- In 2015, Varazdat Khachumyan was awarded the title of Honored Artist of the Republic of Armenia.

== See also ==
- Music of Armenia
- Tango music
