= Carlos Espinoza (dancer) =

Argentine dancer and teacher

Carlos Espinoza (born 8 March 1981) is a Chileno dancer and teacher. His dance style is based on tango milonguero. Together with [Agustina Piaggio] he gives tango classes at various tango festivals around the world.

One of Carlito's first tango teacher was Carlos Malone and Sergio Natario, who taught him the importance of walking.

In 1998 Carlitos began teaching in Argentina and Chile and in 2001, in Europe.

== External links / sources ==
- Carlitos Espinoza and Noelia Hurtado - Milonga de los Domingos - 1 March 2015
- Carlitos Espinoza and Noelia Hurtado - Tango Feast, Torquay, UK - 7 June 2015 (four songs)
- Carlitos Espinoza and Noelia Hurtado - MSTF2013, Poreč, Croatia
- Carlitos Espinoza and Noelia Hurtado - BTF 2013
- Carlitos Espinoza and Noelia Hurtado - Planetango 11, Moscow - 25 October 2013
- Carlitos Espinoza and Noelia Hurtado short introduction at festival web-site
- Carlos Espinoza facebook profile
