= Milonga (dance event) =

Event where Argentine tango is danced

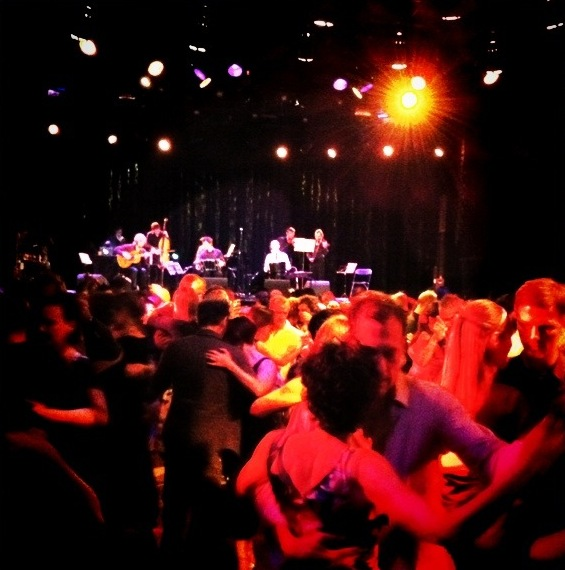
Milonga with live music

A Milonga is an event where Argentine tango is danced. Technically, people who frequently go to milongas may be called milongueros, though in practice this is often taken to refer to an older generation of tango dancers who grew up in the milongas of mid 20th-century Buenos Aires. Many milongas are held on a regular basis (often weekly), and may be accompanied by dancing classes, practice lessons, and sometimes demonstration dances.

== Music ==
The music at a milonga is mainly tango, vals and milonga. While most often recorded music is played, an orchestra may perform live music for part of the event. The core repertoire is traditional tango music from the 1930s to 1950s, the so-called "Golden age of Tango", but sometimes modern interpretations of classical tango music may be mixed in. In Buenos Aires, other types of dance music may be played occasionally, but this is less common elsewhere.

The format for milongas as it is nowadays understood was developed in Buenos Aires in the middle of the 20th century, at a time when live orchestras were no longer as readily available as in the 1930s-1940s. Music is played in sets ("tandas"), usually consisting of three songs (milonga and vals) and three or four (tango). Between tandas, a short piece of non-dancing music, called a "cortina", is played to clear the dance floor and allow for partner changes. Tango tandas will typically be made up of pieces similar in style, i.e. by one and the same orchestra and singer during a certain stylistic period. Vals and milonga tandas may not always be as coherent in style. Tango DJ-ing is considered a form of art that requires in-depth knowledge of the catalog of classical tango recordings.

Alternative formats for milongas exist where modern or non-tango music prevails, which will usually be communicated in advance. Otherwise, at an event advertised as a milonga the DJ will be expected to play a very large proportion of classical tango music.

== Etiquette ==
A number of traditional rules dictate how dancers should choose their dancing partners and navigate the floor; these may be more or less strictly enforced at a specific event.

One fundamental and universally accepted rule is that no one ever has an obligation to accept an invitation for a dance (with the only exception of someone being paid to do so, e.g. a taxi dancer). Importantly, a verbal invitation to contract a dance is strongly discouraged. Instead, mutual eye contact is used, consisting of an open but noncommittal gaze ("mirada") and a nonverbal invitation ("cabeceo") that may be accepted by a nod, or rejected by looking away. (The word "cabeceo" is derived from Spanish "cabeza", meaning "head", and refers to the nod.) One reason for this rule is to minimize embarrassment for those involved if an invitation is rejected; another is to avoid any impression of an obligation to accept a dance. Once accepted, both dancers are committed to dance all of the tanda, and ending the dance prematurely is reserved for episodes of injury or serious misbehaviour (such as groping or making dangerous moves that might result in injury to the partner or others).

Disrespectful behavior towards other dancers is frowned upon, which may include teaching on the dancefloor or commenting on a partner's dance; seeking more body contact than what a partner willingly accepts; or being otherwise intrusive on or off the dancefloor. Other rules dictate how the floor is to be navigated. These say, among others, that the dancefloor should not be entered during a tanda except for dancing, that couples should circle the floor counterclockwise in one or several lanes, that a couple must not rush or slow down others, that a couple entering the floor ask permission from those already dancing, and that expansive moves are not made if they might impede or endanger others. Finally, more informal codes of courtesy are usually observed, e.g. that one does not talk while dancing, except perhaps in the beginning of a song; that a leader accompany the follower to their seat after the tanda; that one apologizes to other couples involved in any mishap; that one does not ask someone for a dance who is obviously only dancing with their partner; that one does not produce overly flashy moves in the context of a social dance; and that one does not publicly criticize the host or the DJ.
