= Sentraal-Suid Koöperasie =

Agricultural cooperative in South Africa

- Company type: Cooperative
- Industry: Agricultural
- Founded: 1931
- Headquarters: Swellendam, South Africa
- Area served: Overberg

Sentraal-Suid Koöperasie (SSK) is an agricultural cooperative founded in 1931 by farmers in the Overberg region of South Africa. Originally known as the Swellendam-Heidelberg Koöperasie, the name was changed to its current form in the 1980s. The head office of SSK is situated in Swellendam, the third oldest town of the Republic of South Africa.

== History ==
The Prime Minister of South Africa at the time, General J. B. M. Hertzog, called for the creation of the Suid Afrikaanse Sentrale Koöperatiewe Graanmaatskappy (English: South African Central Cooperative Grain Company) in 1930 as a response to the need of resources by local farmers. This system of co-operatives was thus started by the then Minister of Agriculture, General Jan Kemp.

On July 15, 1931, the first founders meeting was held to start the co-operative then known as the Swellendamse Boere Koöperatiewe Vereniging (Swellendam’s Farmers Co-operative Society) attendees were:

- P.G. Lourens
- F.J. van Eeden
- M.C. Dippenaar
- J.H.K. van Blommestein
- F.J. Linde and
- D.C. van Dyk

At the second meeting held ten days later the following people joined in,

- M.J. Streicher
- D.H. van Papendorp
- and P.J. de Wet

Mr. van Blommestein the only person amongst the “Directors”, who had a University degree in law took the lead and were also elected as the first Chairmen. The start was a worrying affair and already ten days after the founding of the new institution member P.J. de Wet resigned.

== See also ==
- Agriculture in South Africa
