= Susana Miller =

Susana Miller is an Argentine tango professional who is one of the most prominent teachers and dancers of the modern milonguero style of tango. She introduced the term Milonguero Style in the mid 1990s when she was assisted by Cacho Dante, Pedro 'Tete' Rusconi, and other milongueros with whom she collaborated to develop a new didactic and system to teach tango. Born in Buenos Aires, Miller continues to teach there as well as internationally.
