= Otros Aires =

Argentine musical group

- Origin: Spain/Argentina
- Genres: Tango
- Years active: 2003–present
- Members: Miguel Di Genova and friends
- Website: www.otrosaires.com

Otros Aires is an Argentine 21st-century tango music group founded in 2003 in Barcelona by Argentine musician and architect Miguel Di Genova.

Otros Aires mixes early tango and milonga structures from the beginning of the 20th century (Gardel, Razzano, D'Arienzo, etc.) with electronic sequences, melodies and lyrics from the 21st century.

The project counts many collaborators like Diego Ramos (piano and arrangements), Chloë Pfeiffer (piano), Lalo Zanelli (piano), Martin Bruhn (drums), Martin Paladino (drums), Manu Mayol (drums and production) Pablo Potenzoni (drums), Javier Saume Mazzei (drums), Christian Maturano (drums), Carlos Ocorso (percussion), Hugo Satorre (bandoneon), Lisandre Donoso (bandoneon), Herve Esquis (bandoneon), Emmanuel Trifilio (bandoneon), Simone Van Der Veerden (bandoneon), Korey Ireland (bandoneon), Joe Power (harmonica), Nick Wadlew (cover art), Pablo Meketa (cover art), Marcelo Sofia (cover art), Charly Fiorentino (cover art), Miru Trigo (photography) and Santiago Saponi (video director), among others.

On December 11, 2004, known as "Tango day", Otros Aires released its first CD at the Carlos Gardel House Museum, commemorating the birthday of the singer.

The band's quick international success has led to them touring the world since 2006. With about 40 tours, including more than 200 cities in Europe, North America and South America, Otros Aires has performed at some of the most important venues and world music festivals in the world, including Lincoln Center (NYC), Dublin National Concert Hall, Bardentreffen Festival (Nuremberg), Amsterdam Roots Festival, Greensound Festival (Bucharest), and Pirineos Sur Festival (Spain), and also at the world's most relevant tango festivals including Buenos Aires Tango Festival several times.

Otros Aires' songs have been featured in television shows like Dancing with the Stars and America's Got Talent in the US and Strictly Come Dancing in the UK.

== Discography ==
- Otros Aires (2004):
1. "Sin Rumbo" (with samples from "La Viruta" performed by the Orquesta de Juan D'Arienzo in 1936)
2. "Percanta" (with samples from the first tango song in history, "Mi Noche Triste", recorded by Carlos Gardel)
3. "La Pampa Seca" (with samples from "El Carretero" recorded by Carlos Gardel in 1922)
4. "Barrio de Tango"
5. "Milonga Sentimental" (with samples from "Milonga Sentimental" recorded by Carlos Gardel in 1933)
6. "Aquel muchacho bueno" (with samples from "Aquel Muchacho Triste" recorded by Carlos Gardel in 1929)
7. "Rotos en el Raval"
8. "De puro curda"
9. "Amor que se baila" (based on "Milonga De Mis Amores")
10. "En dirección a mi casa" (with samples from "El Carretero" recorded by Carlos Gardel in 1922)
- Otros Aires Dos (2007):
1. "Allerdings Otros Aires"
2. "Otro Puente Alsina"
3. "Otra Noche en 'La Viruta"
4. "Los Vino"
5. "Niebla del Riachuelo"
6. "Un Baile a Beneficio"
7. "La Yumba" (based on the same piece by Osvaldo Pugliese)
8. "Junto a las Piedras"
9. "Otra Esquina"
10. "A Veces"
- Vivo En Otros Aires (2008):
1. "Introducción"
2. "Milonga Sentimental"
3. "Sin Rumbo"
4. "Rotos En El Raval"
5. "Allerdings Otros Aires"
6. "Un Baile A Beneficio"
7. "Otra Noche En La Viruta"
8. "Aquel Muchacho Bueno"
9. "Barrio De Tango"
10. "La Pampa Seca"
11. "Amor Que Se Baila"
12. "Percanta"
13. "Los Vino"
14. "La Yumba"
15. "Allerdings Otros Aires" [correctly listed twice]
- Otros Aires Tricota (2010):
1. "Tristeza de Arrabal"
2. "Essa" (based on "9 de Julio")
3. "Quisiera Que Estés Conmigo"
4. "Barrio De Amor"
5. "Tangwerk"
6. "Junto A La Aurora"
7. "Mariposita"
8. "El Misionero"
9. "No Sé"
10. "La Otra Orilla"
- Otros Aires 4 (2013):
1. "Big Man Dancing"
2. "Perfume De Mujer"
3. "Buenos Aires Va"
4. "Raro" (Versión Español Siciliano)
5. "El Porteñito"
6. "Poema"
7. "Con Un Hachazo Al Costado"
8. "Perfect Day"
9. "Otro Puente Alsina Reloaded"
10. "Volver a Verte"
11. "Catedral"
12. "Big Man Dancing" (Remix by Vivi Pedraglio)
13. "Los Vino Movilo" (Bonus)
- Otros Aires Perfect Tango (2016):
1. "Amor o Nada"
2. "Like a Tango"
3. "Bailando sin Paraiso"
4. "Solo esta Noche"
5. "Perfect Tango"
6. "Todo Baila"
7. "Perro Viejo"
8. "Digital Ego"
9. "Un Matecito y un Beso"
10. "I've seen That Face Before"
