= Norberto Esbrez =

Argentine dancer (1966–2014)

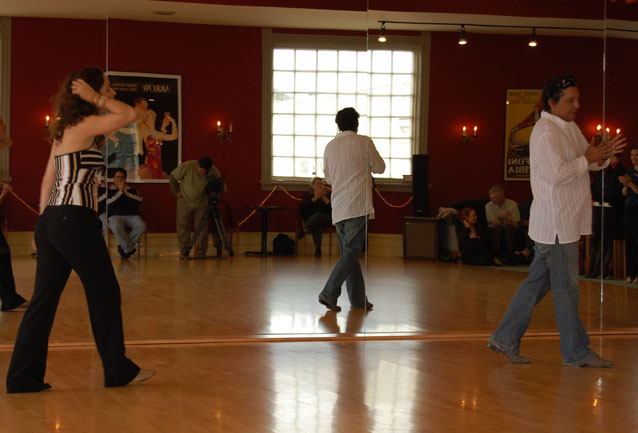
Norberto Esbrez and Luiza Paes teaching at Shall we Dance dance studio in Pacific Grove, California

Norberto Esbrez (November 22, 1966 - July 16, 2014) was an Argentine tango dancer, choreographer and teacher.

A dancer and teacher of tango nuevo, he was known as El Pulpo or octopus for his fluid and intricate leg moves. Esbrez created and named several tango movements including: ocho loco, sentada girada, elevador, or el elástico. He explored the concept of trap sacadas (sacadas con agarre) and enganches into innovative variations.

His style was so well known that when the dancer starts combining several leg moves that look like Pulpo's it is being called pulpeadas. He developed the concept of suspension as a tool to generate the control and fluidity that is part of his dance.

He worked for theaters and show-places in Buenos Aires, such as: Teatro San Martin, Teatro Astral, Teatro Opera, Cafe Tortoni, El Viejo Almacen, La Ventana, Casablanca. He taught in Brazil as a member of the Academia Argentina de Tango. One of Esbrez's partners was Luiza Paes - they were part of the International Congress of Argentine Tango in Buenos Aires.

He died on July 16, 2014, in Buenos Aires of complications of a liver disease.

== See also ==
- List of dancers
