= Gancho (dance move) =

Latin American dance move

Gancho means "hook" in Spanish and Portuguese, and describes certain "hooking actions" in some dances of Latin American heritage, in Argentine Tango (leg action) and Salsa (arm action and foot action) in particular.

== Tango ==
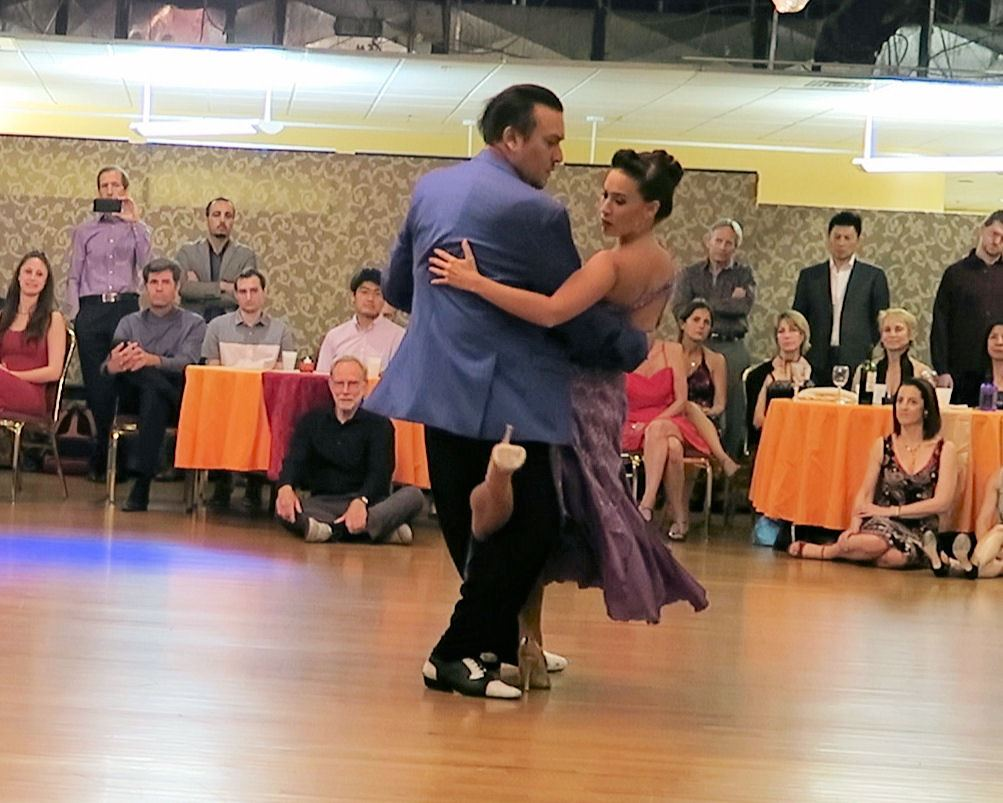
Gancho performed by Juana Sepúlveda with her partner Chicho Frúmboli.

In Argentine Tango, a gancho is a sharp move when a dancer hooks a leg around a partner's leg by bending the knee and then straightening. Both male and female partners may perform ganchos, however when followers perform them, they often happen as a consequence of their trailing leg running into one of the leader's (purposefully positioned) legs. This hooking may be done both from either side of the partner's leg.

== Salsa ==
In Salsa, the term "gancho" is used in two senses.

One is a synonym of the Hook Turn.

Another one is an arm action, usually performed by the man. The man holds the lady's left hand by his right hand at approximately the shoulder level, the joined arms are bent in the elbows. With hands still joined, the man hooks his elbow by a motion from the inside to the outside over the lady's arm and slightly presses the inside of his arm to the outside of the lady's arm, drawing the lady closer. This gancho action may be done by the either arm or by both arms, either simultaneously or in turn. The hand grip may either be kept, or immediately released after the hook. Exits from the resulting position vary.
