= Carlos Libedinsky =

- Born: 1961 (age 63–64)
- Origin: Buenos Aires, Argentina
- Genres: Tango, Electronica, Experimental
- Years active: 2001–present
- Website: www.narcotango.com.ar

Carlos Libedinsky is an Argentine musician, composer and, producer. Born in 1961, he is most renowned for his neo-tango project, Narcotango.

Before tango, Libedinsky transited through different genres, such as rock, pop, blues, medieval, and renaissance music. In 1992, he founded the duet Los Mareados, where he was also a composer.

Since 1986, he has been the director of Tademus, a music school in Buenos Aires.

As Narcotango, he made European tours in 2003, 2005, and 2007.

The Narcotango band consists of the following members:

- Carlos Libedinsky, on bandoneón
- Mariano Castro, on keyboard and samplers
- Marcelo Toth, on guitar
- Fernando del Castillo, on drums/ percussion
- Juan Pablo Maicas, on bass

== Discography ==
- Aldea Global (2001) - tango
- Narcotango (2003) - neo-tango
- Narcotango vol. 2 (2006) - neo-tango
- Narcotango en vivo (2008)
- Limanueva (2010)
- Cuenco (2013)
