= Cortina (tango) =

Short piece of music played between tandas

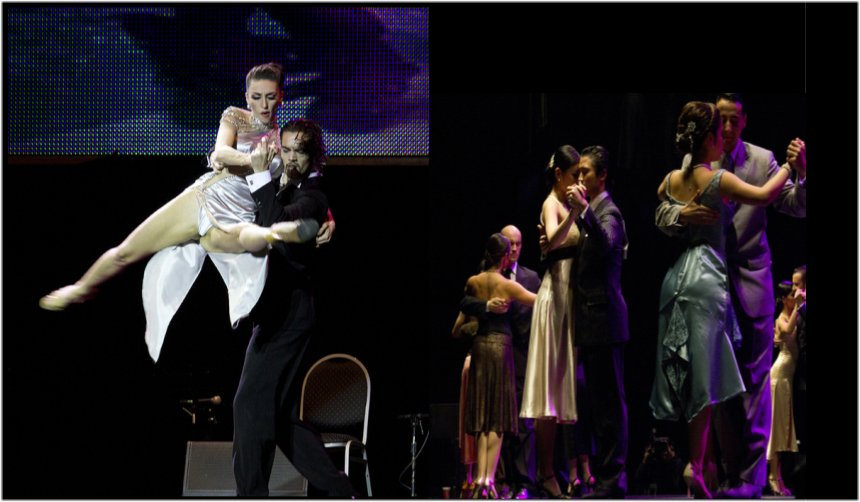
Tango Dance World Championship. The two competitive categories: left "tango escenario" (stage tango); right "tango de pista" (saloon tango)

A cortina (curtain) is a short piece (20–60 seconds) of music that is played between tandas at a milonga (tango dance event). The cortina lets the dancers know that the tanda has ended. The partners can then thank each other and return to their own tables, to find a new dance partner at the next tanda. Cortinas are used at many of the milongas in Argentina and Uruguay and increasingly elsewhere.
