= Ronda (tango) =

Ronda (Spanish "la ronda" for "the ring" or "the round") refers to the line of dance in Argentine Tango. Similar to ballroom dancing the traditional ronda requires the dance couples to move counter clockwise around the room. This enables many couples to share the floor in social dance situations.

The ronda consists of imagined concentric lanes on the dance floor. (A medium floor has usually of 2-3 of these lanes.) In each lane couples are dancing only behind/in front of each other, never next to each other. The couples move with roughly the same pace, leaving a similar distance between each other. When the floor is particularly crowded the couples move effectively with each step into the space where the couple in front of them just had been.

The ronda enables the dancers to move in a predictable way. Knowing in roughly what direction the other people will move, helps the couples to dance calmer and more focused. With this they enjoy the dance better.

== See also ==
- Tango (dance)
