= Tanda (milonga) =

Turn of dancing in a milonga

A tanda is a turn of dancing in a milonga, and by association, a set of pieces of music, usually between three and five, that is played for one turn. The most common style is to play four pieces in the tango tandas, three in the milonga tandas, and three or four in the vals tandas.

Most commonly the music is tango, milonga or vals. Between tandas is played a cortina (Spanish for "curtains"), a musical pause to allow dancers to leave the floor and to serve as a short break between tandas.

Tandas are normally arranged by feel of the music. A typical order of tandas is: T-T-V-T-T-M (T for a tanda of tangos, V for a tanda of vals cruzado, M for a tanda of milongas).

== Structure inside a tanda ==
It is common to choose the music for a tanda from a given orchestra and era, often with the same vocalist (or, as an alternative, purely instrumental pieces). Mixing different vocalists, eras or even orchestras is rare. This approach is chosen for the comfort of the dancers, with two main reasons

- When a new tanda starts, the dancers can listen to the beginning of the first piece to learn whether they like the music or not, and based on this decide to ask someone to dance this tanda, or take a break.
- The dancers can adjust to a type of music in the beginning song of the tanda, without having to readjust for each song.

Sometimes, in a minority of milongas in Argentina, non-tango tandas are also played, like Rock n roll, Cumbia or Chacarera, but rarely for more than one tanda.

== See also ==
- Tango (dance)
- Tango music
- Cortina (tango)
