= Close embrace =

Partner dance position

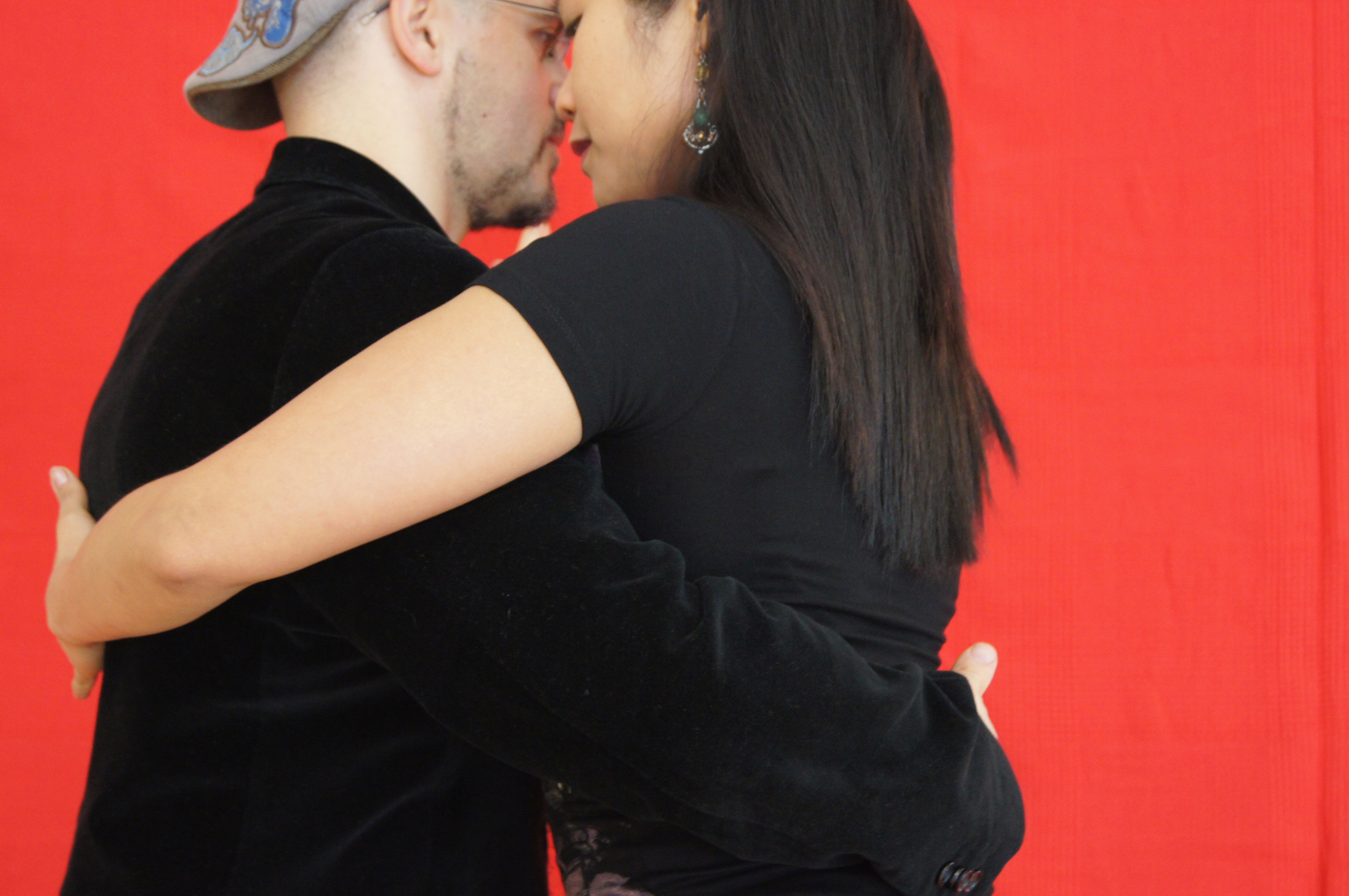
Argentine tango close embrace

In partner dances, close embrace is a type of closed position where the leader and follower stand facing each other chest-to-chest in full or partial body contact. The dancers usually stand offset from one another, such that each has their right foot in between the feet of their partner. When in close embrace, the dance is led (and followed) with the whole body, rather than with the arms or with visual cues. Various partner dances make use of this position, most notably Argentine Tango, but also Balboa, Collegiate Shag, Swing Walk, Blues, Salsa Dance, and others. The purpose of the pose is to make contact with the partners.

== See also ==
- Closed position
