= South African Chamber for Agricultural Development in Africa =

The South African Chamber for Agricultural Development in Africa (SACADA) is a South African non-governmental organisation founded in 1995 with the support of President Nelson Mandela to stimulate the regional economy. One of the main tasks of SACADA was to improve export-oriented plantations. In 1996 it started to settle many farmers in Mozambique creating a joint venture called "SMD" with the Mozambicans. According to the president of the organization, Dries Bruwer, the successes of the project in Mozambique has resulted in twenty other African countries asking SACADA to carry on similar programs in their countries. The organization has been criticized by Michel Chossudovsky because of practices which, he says, destroy small farmers in the lands where SACADA works.
