= Gustavo Naveira =

Argentine tango dancer and teacher (born 1960)

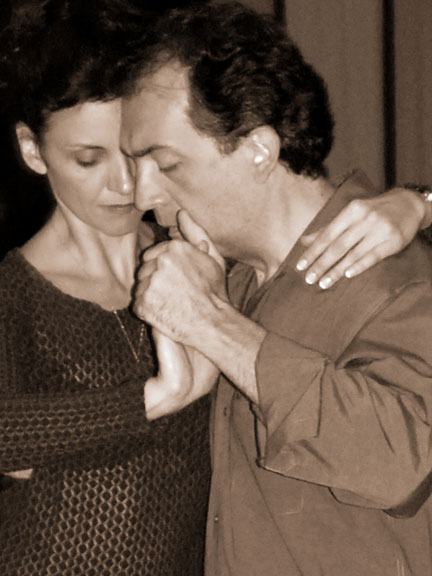
- Gustavo Naveira with Giselle Anne during a tango class in Boulder, Colorado
- Born: August 12, 1960 (age 66); Comodoro Rivadavia, Chubut Province, Argentina

Gustavo Naveira (born 12 August 1960) is an Argentine tango dancer and teacher who contributed to the detailed analysis of the movements of dancing to Argentine tango.

== Biography ==
He was born in Comodoro Rivadavia, province of Chubut. His family moved to Buenos Aires when he was a year old. He played the guitar from age 7 to 20 and studied it at the conservatory for three years. He began dancing at age of 20. His parents met while dancing milonga. His first professors of tango were Dinzels:

"My first steps with dancing occurred unexpectedly when I studied economy in the University of Buenos Aires where there was a course which I attended. There I came to know of my affinity with dancing. Later I studied folk music dancing and enrolled in short courses of classical, modern and Spanish dances. But always it was rather out of curiosity than for a professional interest.

The first teacher I had was Rodolfo Dinzel. But I learnt things from several milongueros in a not much organized way. An instructor that gave me a lot was Pepito Avellaneda but I cannot leave unmentioned Antonio Todaro and Gerardo Portalea."

He appeared in the 1997 film The Tango Lesson with Sally Potter. He formed a group with Fabian Salas and Pablo Veron during preparation for the film. Later, he and Salas founded the Cosmotango organization, in which he took part for a few years.

He has been dancing with Giselle Anne since approximately 1995. They met in Spain, at Sitges dancing together in a show.

They are known for their intellectual approach to dance as teachers. They have two children. Gustavo also has two more children, Ariadna and Federico, from a previous relationship with Olga Besio.

Gustavo and Gisele Anne live in Boulder, Colorado where they have their own tango studio and teach tango seminars. They travel and teach tango abroad. From 2010 they organize in Boulder, Colorado an Argentine Tango Festival: BTF (Boulder Tango Festival), around the months of September/October each year.

=== Relationship with tango nuevo ===
In 2009, he published the programmatic essay New Tango, in which he states:

"There is great confusion on the question of the way of dancing the tango: call it technique, form, or style. The term tango nuevo, is used to refer to a style of dancing, which is an error. In reality, tango nuevo is everything that has happened with the tango since the 1980s. It is not a question of a style... The words tango nuevo express what is happening with tango dancing in general; namely that it is evolving. Tango nuevo is not one more style; it is simply that tango dancing is growing, improving, developing, enriching itself, and in that sense we are moving toward a new dimension in tango dancing...There has been much recent discussion, in the community of tango dancers, on the problem of the embrace, dividing the dance into open or closed style, which is also a matter of great confusion. Open embrace or closed embrace, dancing with space or dancing close, these are all outmoded terms. This is an old way of thinking, resulting from the lack of technical knowledge in past eras. This simple and clumsy division between open and closed is often used by those who try to deny the evolution of the dance, to disguise their own lack of knowledge. Today it is perfectly clear that the distances in the dance have a much greater complexity than a simple open or closed... We have learned, and we have developed our knowledge. The result of this is a dance of greater possibilities, and also of a much more artistic quality."

== Legacy ==
He managed to clarify concepts about the structure of the dance. This has allowed many to understand tango dance better and teaching levels have risen considerably thanks to these concepts. He exposed the different uses of the axis and the structure of the turn ('giro'). He managed to translate this structure to the whole dance simplifying it all in 'cruce adelante', 'apertura' and 'cruce atrás'. He also managed to clarify the different ways of understanding and explaining changes of directions and he also transmitted the interpretation of rhythmical patterns specially the so-called 'cincopations'.

The critics in Bs. As. said: "…You could say that three stylistic tendencies contend for supremacy: Urquiza’s style, Almagro’s style and Naveira’s style …" (Clarín 8/8/99, Buenos Aires Argentina).

He was one of the main influences of Chicho Frumboli's beginnings as a tango dancer.
