= Nuevo tango =

Music genre

Nuevo tango (New tango) is both a form of music in which new elements are incorporated into traditional tango music, and an evolution of tango dance that began to develop in the 1980s.

== Dance ==
=== Origins ===
Prior to the 1990s, Argentine tango was taught with a didactic method: teaching tango by having students copy examples shown by the instructor. Emphasis was not given to how or why movement was done a certain way. Tango dance in Argentina fell into general disrepute during the junta of 1976–83, to the point that the few professionals left as teachers were looked down upon, and the young people of the time rarely participated in the few opportunities to dance. Ironically, the quote "el ser Argentino…vive la expresion tango" (meaning tango is part of the Argentine essence, or identity) comes from the 1975 book El Tango y Gardel, commissioned by the Argentine government in homage to Carlos Gardel. Gustavo Naveira's instruction began to be offered after Argentina became democratic again in 1983 and restrictions on social life eased. He reported that despite his nerves about teaching, the classes drew "crowds of 200 or more", and many older former dancers became instructors as social tango returned. The popular reinstatement of tango is culturally seen by many Argentines as a point of nationalistic pride and self-representation.

Starting in the 1990s in Buenos Aires, the Tango Investigation Group (later transformed into the Cosmotango organization) founded by Gustavo Naveira and Fabián Salas applied the principles of dance kinesiology from modern dance to analyze the physics of movement in Argentine tango. Taking what they learned from this analysis they then began to explore all the possibilities of movement within the framework of Argentine Tango. From the work of these founders of the tango nuevo movement, there was shift in all styles of tango away from teaching what to dance toward teaching how to dance.

Milonga in the last decades of the 20th century maintained a sense of exclusion toward the new tango style, where "the clash was between generations" whose older constituents acted as stewards of the formulaic style. According to one professional, "They didn’t want anybody else to come and change things." The alternative center for young dancers then sprang up in the form of the modern practica, beginning with the opening of the popular El Motivo at the Villa Malcolm social club in 2004. The accelerating creation of a nuevo tango beginning around this time is consistent with anthropologist Martin Stokes's idea that dance is a play form, and that along with music it is a form of "social creativity", subject to instability in times of social change. Its formation and forging of a new social scene exemplifies the view of musical anthropology that music creates, rather than is created from, social life.

Though widely referred to as a tango style outside of Argentina, tango nuevo is not considered a style of dancing tango by the founders of the movement. It refers only to the method of analysis and teaching developed through the application of the principles of dance kinesiology to Argentine tango. In 2009, Gustavo Naveira published an essay New Tango, in which he states: "There is great confusion on the question of the way of dancing the tango: call it technique, form, or style. The term Tango Nuevo, is used to refer to a style of dancing, which is an error. In reality, Tango Nuevo is everything that has happened with the tango since the 1980s. It is not a question of a style... The words Tango Nuevo express what is happening with tango dancing in general; namely that it is evolving." Therefore, as Gustavo Naveira and the other founders of the tango nuevo movement have said, all styles of tango, which have now been influenced by the analysis of the dance, are all tango nuevo.

Despite the insistence by the founders of the tango nuevo movement that it is not a single style, it has become an accepted term by many that it is a separate and distinct style of tango. Considered by many as the most famous practitioners of tango nuevo are Mariano "Chicho" Frumboli, Pablo Verón, Roberto Herrera (who even dedicated a whole Tango show to this new style: Tango Nuevo, premiere 2005), Gustavo Naveira, Norberto "El Pulpo" Esbrés, Fabián Salas, Esteban Moreno, Claudia Codega, Sebastián Arce and Mariana Montes. All of these dancers have highly individual styles that cannot be confused with each other, yet are all referred to by many as the tango nuevo style.

Critics of what some call the tango nuevo style claim that with all the emphasis being on the physics of the dance, that the connection to the music, the feeling, and the traditions of Argentine tango have been lost to the newer generations of tango dancers. Referring to the newer generations of tango nuevo dancers, one of the founders of the tango nuevo movement, Mariano "Chicho" Frumboli stated in an interview: "They are completely lost! I learnt with the last great milongueros, I took the information directly from them. [...] The problem is that we missed something in the teaching, I take total responsibility, and other colleagues should do so as well. I can't pass on what I have learned. I was crazy about creating, because I saw a new vein in the evolution of the movement. I threw myself into that, and I lost the way to be able to pass on the tango essence that I have very much inside. Because of this I feel that lately there are a lot of people who don't understand or know what the real essence of this dance is."

Critics of tango nuevo also say that there is little difference in the way it is practiced than show tango. In an interview, Mariano Frumboli said: "Today you do a volcada and a colgada and it is the same because they are there, commercially speaking, in the same package. Then, between doing a sandwichito or a volcada… people do a volcada! Because it's more eye-catching. [...] They are not going to make a sandwichito to enjoy that moment, but whatever shows them more and better." The increased openness in bodily movement extends to the face, where previously the cara de tango or standardized expression of passion was socially required; this is no longer a given between professional dancers at social tango events.

In July 2009, Gustavo Naveira wrote about nuevo tango:

There is great confusion on the question of the way of dancing the tango: call it technique, form, or style. The term tango nuevo is used to refer to a style of dancing, which is an error. In reality, Tango Nuevo is everything that has happened with the tango since the 1980s. It is not a question of a style... The words Tango Nuevo are neither a specific term nor a title (except in the case of a musical work by Astor Piazzolla). With this in mind, these words directly express, through their literal meaning, what is happening with tango dancing in general; namely that it is evolving. Tango Nuevo is not one more style; it is simply that tango dancing is growing, improving, developing, enriching itself, and in that sense we are moving toward a new dimension in tango dancing... There has been much recent discussion, in the community of tango dancers, on the problem of the embrace, dividing the dance into open or closed style, which is also a matter of great confusion. Open embrace or closed embrace, dancing with space or dancing close, these are all outmoded terms. This is an old way of thinking, resulting from the lack of technical knowledge in past eras. This simple and clumsy division between open and closed is often used by those who try to deny the evolution of the dance, to disguise their own lack of knowledge. Today it is perfectly clear that the distances in the dance have a much greater complexity than a simple open or closed... We have learned, and we have developed our knowledge. The result of this is a dance of greater possibilities, and also of a much more artistic quality.

== Music ==
The most important composer of nuevo tango was Astor Piazzolla, who revolutionized tango in the 1950s by introducing new instruments such as the saxophone and electric guitar, and who brought new forms of harmonic and melodic structure into the traditional tango. Piazzolla's Quintento Nuevo Tango (1978–1988) with Astor Piazzolla, Fernando Suarez Paz, Hector Console, Horacio Malvicino and Pablo Ziegler was decisive for the worldwide success of Nuevo Tango. Sometime later, Piazzolla met jazz saxophonist Gerry Mulligan, which led to the production of an album considered a classic of the genre: Summit.

Other composers of tango nuevo include Osvaldo Pugliese, Ariel Ramirez, and Juan Carlos Caceres. Neotango is 21st century tango composed and/or orchestrated in the 21st century. Often it includes the fusion of electronic and acoustic sounds. Some examples of neotango music artists are Tanghetto, Bajofondo, Electrocutango, Federico Aubele, Gotan Project, Nuevo Tango Ensamble, Ensemble Montréal Tango, Narcotango (album by Carlos Libedinsky), Dure-mère, Rodrigo Favela (Latin tango), Pablo Ziegler and Otros Aires.

== Performers ==
- Astor Piazzolla
- Fernando Suarez Paz
- Athens Tango Project
- Leonardo Suarez Paz
- Pablo Zeigler
- Ariel Ramirez
- Juan Carlos Caceres
- Bajofondo
- Cadence Ensemble
- Electrocutango
- Federico Aubele
- Gotan Project
- Narcotango
- Octeto Buenos Aires
- Otros Aires
- Tanghetto
- Tosca Tango Orchestra
- Marcelo Nisinman
- Carlos Libedinsky
- Adrián Iaies
- Richard Galliano
- Pino Presti
