= Tango =

Argentinian and Uruguayan partner dance

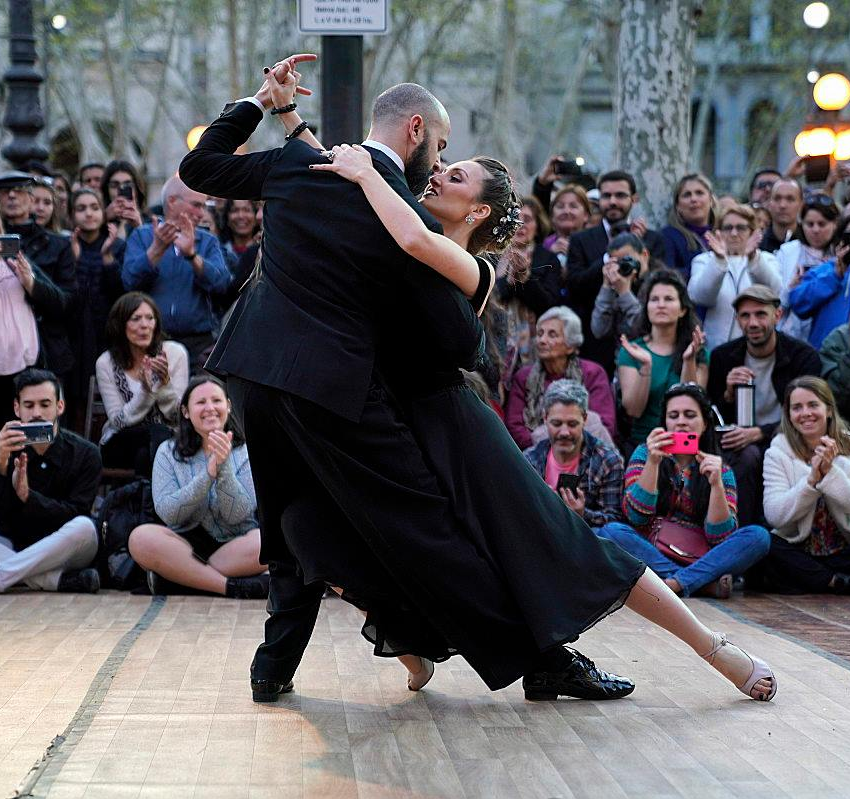
- Tango dancers in Montevideo, Uruguay
- Origin: Río de la Plata (Argentina and Uruguay)

Tango
- UNESCO Intangible Cultural Heritage
- Country: Argentina, Uruguay
- Reference: 00258
- Region: Latin America and the Caribbean

Inscription history
- Inscription: 2009 (4th session)
- List: Representative

Tango is a partner and social dance that originated in the 1880s along the Río de la Plata, the natural border between Argentina and Uruguay. The tango was born in the impoverished port areas of these countries from a combination of Argentine Milonga, Spanish-Cuban Habanera, and Uruguayan Candombe celebrations. It was frequently practiced in the brothels and bars of ports, where business owners employed bands to entertain their patrons. It then spread to the rest of the world. A number of variations of this dance currently exist around the world.

On August 31, 2009, UNESCO approved a joint proposal by Argentina and Uruguay to include the tango in the UNESCO Intangible Cultural Heritage Lists.

== Etymology ==
There are several theories regarding the origin of the word tango, none of which has been proven. An African culture is often credited as the creator of this word; in particular, it is theorized that the word derives from the Yoruba word shangó, which refers to Shango, the God of Thunder in traditional Yoruba religion. This theory suggests that the word "shangó" was morphed through the dilution of the Nigerian language once it reached South America via slave trade. According to an alternative theory, tango is derived from the Spanish word for "drum", tambor. This word was then mispronounced by Buenos Aires’ lower-class inhabitants to become tambo, ultimately resulting in the common tango. It is also sometimes theorized that the word is derived from the Portuguese word tanger, which means "to play a musical instrument". Another Portuguese word, tangomão, a combination of the verb tanger ("to touch") with the noun mão ("hand") meaning "to play a musical instrument with one's hands", has been suggested as the etymon of tango.

According to some authors, tango is derived from the Kongo word ntangu which means "sun", "hour", "space-time".

The topic of the etymology of the term "tango" remains the subject of intense controversy. One of the foundational works on the issue is José Gobello's article Tango, vocablo controvertido (1976), which specifically highlights the controversial climate surrounding the origin of the word. The core of the passionate debate is essentially civilizational, since it focuses on determining the role played by indigenous, Latin American, African, and European cultures in shaping the expression. Reflecting on this civilizational dispute, Gobello said in 1999:

Even today specialists debate whether Hispanic or African ingredients predominated in the making of tango. The discussion is rather idle, because the Hispanic ingredients in question also had their share of black blood.

— José Gobello

The researcher Héctor Benedetti, in his essay Sobre la etimología de la palabra tango (2001), provides a detailed review of the various theories that have been proposed and the fate of each. Theories about the origin of the word "tango" go back to the 1914 edition of the Dictionary of the Royal Spanish Academy, which stated that it derived from the Latin tangere, a claim removed in later editions.

In 1957, historian Ricardo Rodríguez Molas researched the languages of enslaved people brought to Argentina, mainly belonging to ethnic groups from the Congo, the Gulf of Guinea, and southern Sudan, and discovered the existence of the word "tango" used to refer to "meeting places", both in Africa and in colonial America. Rodríguez Molas then argued that the word "tango" is of African origin.

Rodríguez Molas cites a complaint from 1789, made by Manuel Warnes (then an official of the cabildo of Buenos Aires), in which the word "tango" is used to refer to slave dances:

Do not allow such dances and gatherings as those of the tango, because in them there is nothing but theft and unrest, so that blacks may live freely and shake off the yoke of slavery.

In Montevideo, at that time, the word "tango" was used with a similar meaning. The Uruguayan musicologist Lauro Ayestarán quoted in his foundational work La música del Uruguay the resolution of the Cabildo of Montevideo of 26 September 1807, issued with the agreement of governor Francisco Javier de Elío:

On tambos, black dances. Since black dances are harmful in every respect, they are to be absolutely prohibited, inside and outside the city, and whoever contravenes this shall be punished with one month of public works.

— Resolution of the Cabildo of Montevideo
in agreement with Governor Francisco Javier Elío, 26 September 1807

Notably, the cited provision of Viceroy Elío was recorded in the index of the Actas Capitulares using the term "tango". In the Viceroyalty of the Río de la Plata, the terms "tango" and "tambo" were used as synonyms to refer to places where black people danced.

Precisely from the widespread use of the words "tambo" and "tango" as synonyms, the researcher Oscar Escalada, of the University of La Plata, argues that the origin of the term is Quechua, from the word tanpu, Hispanicized by the Spanish conquerors as "tambo" and then used as a synonym for "tango".

Along a different line, it has also been pointed out that the word "tango" has existed in Andalusia since the mid-19th century, to designate a musical genre called tango flamenco or tango andaluz, whose origin has been traced to around 1823 in Cuba, in the black neighborhood of Havana. Flamenco tango, in turn, shows Afro-Cuban—particularly habanera—and African influences. Both the habanera and flamenco tango are among the genres that most influenced the emergence of tango as a musical genre.

Finally, taking into account the widespread use in the Río de la Plata since colonial times of the expressions "tambo-tango", and at the same time the expression "tango andaluz", a double-entry theory has been proposed. It suggests that the word "tango" was used in the Río de la Plata during the 18th and 19th centuries to designate sites of black dances, and then re-entered in the second half of the 19th century, coming from Cuba–Andalusia, this time to designate the dance and musical genre.

== History ==
Video on the history of tango

Tango is a dance that has influences from African and European culture. Dances from the Candombe ceremonies of former African enslaved people helped shape the modern day tango. The dance originated in working-class districts of Buenos Aires and Montevideo. Tango music derived from the fusion of various forms of music from Europe. The words "tango" and "tambo" around the River Plate basin were initially used to refer to musical gatherings of slaves, with written records of colonial authorities attempting to ban such gatherings as early as 1789.

Initially, it was just one of the many dances, but it soon became popular throughout society, as theatres and street barrel organs spread it from the suburbs to the working-class slums, which were packed with hundreds of thousands of European immigrants.

When the tango began to spread internationally around 1900, cultural norms were generally conservative, and so tango dancing was widely regarded as extremely sexual and inappropriate for public display. This led to a phenomenon of culture shock. Additionally, the combination of African, Native American and European cultural influences in tango was new and unusual to most of the Western world.

Many neighbourhoods of Buenos Aires have their particular tango histories: for example La Boca, San Telmo and Boedo. At Boedo Avenue, Cátulo Castillo, Homero Manzi and other singers and composers used to meet at the Japanese Cafe with the Boedo Group.

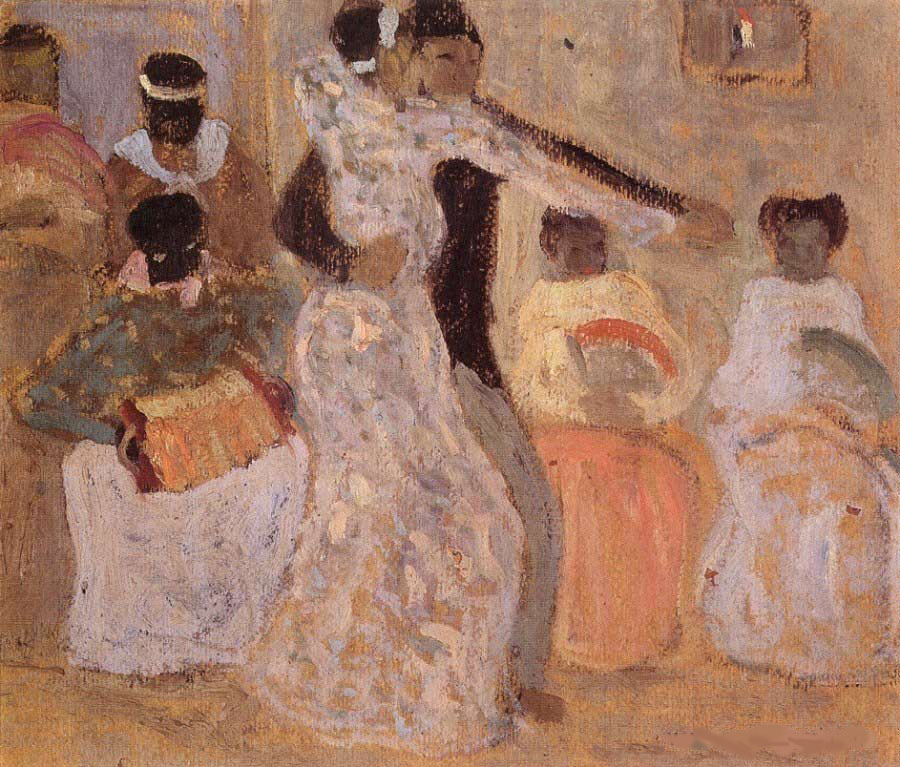
El Tango by Uruguayan painter Pedro Figari

In the early years of the 20th century, dancers and orchestras from Buenos Aires travelled to Europe, and the first European tango craze took place in Paris, soon followed by London, Berlin, and other capitals. Tango historian Nardo Zalko, a native of Buenos Aires who lived most of his life in Paris, investigated the mutual fertilization between the two cities in his work, Paris – Buenos Aires, Un Siècle de Tango ("A Century of Tango"). Towards the end of 1913, it hit New York City as well as Finland. In the US, around 1911, the word "tango" was often applied to dances in a 2/4 or 4/4 rhythm such as the one-step. The term was fashionable and did not indicate that tango steps would be used in the dance, although they might be. Tango music was sometimes played but at a rather fast tempo. Instructors of the period would sometimes refer to this as a "North American tango", versus the so-called "Argentine tango". The tango was controversial because of its perceived sexual overtones and, by the end of 1913, the dance teachers who had introduced the dance to Paris were banished from the city. By 1914, more authentic tango stylings were soon developed, along with some variations like Albert Newman's "Minuet" tango.

In Argentina, the onset in 1929 of the Great Depression, and restrictions introduced after the overthrow of the Hipólito Yrigoyen government in 1930, caused a temporary decline in tango's popularity. Its fortunes were reversed later in the 1930s, and tango again became widely fashionable and a matter of national pride under the first Perón government, which in turn had a major effect on Argentinian culture overall. Mariano Mores played a role in the resurgence of the tango in 1950s Argentina. Mores's Taquito Militar was premiered in 1952 during a governmental speech by President Juan D. Perón, which generated a strong political and cultural controversy between different views of the concepts of "cultured" music and "popular" music, as well as the links between both "cultures".

Tango declined again in the late 1950s, as a result of economic depression and the banning of public gatherings by the military dictatorships; male-only tango practice—the custom at the time—was considered "public gathering". That, indirectly, boosted the popularity of rock and roll because, unlike tango, it did not require such gatherings. However, in the late 1980s the tango again experienced a resurgence in Argentina, partly due to the endeavors of Osvaldo Peredo.

In 2009, the tango was added to the UNESCO Intangible Cultural Heritage Lists.

== Styles ==
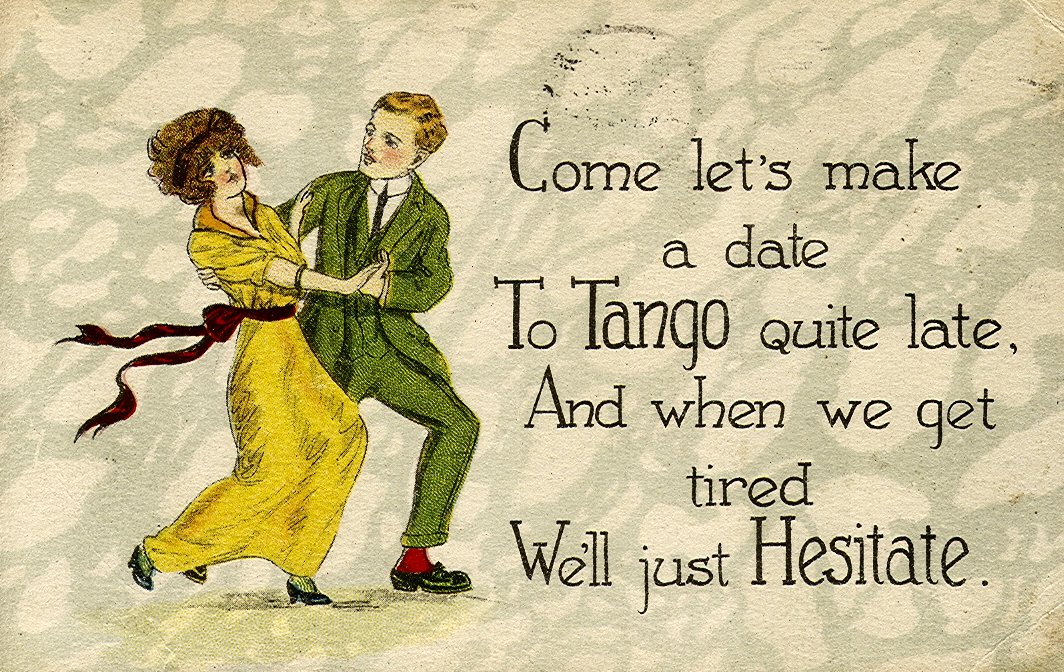
Tango postcard, c. 1919.

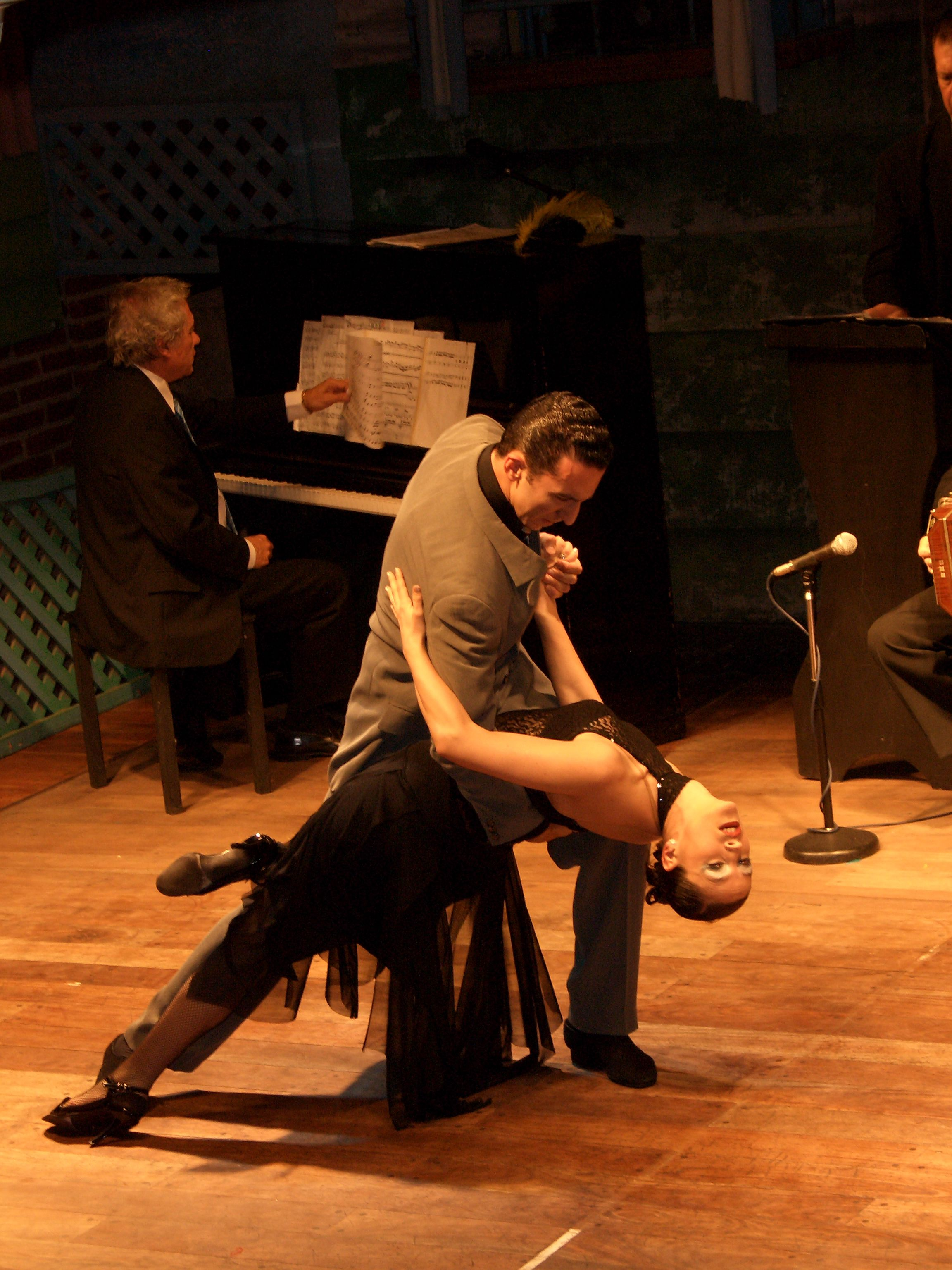
Choreographed stage tango in Buenos Aires, 2005.

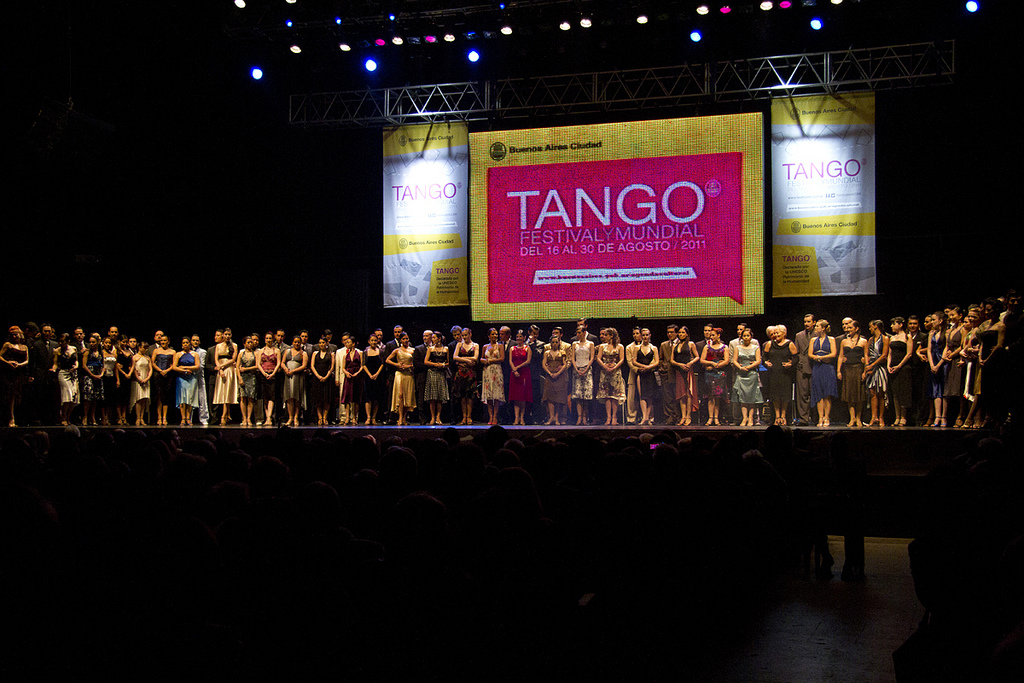
Tango Dance World Championship 2011, Luna Park, Buenos Aires.

The tango consists of a variety of styles that developed in different regions and eras of Argentina, as well as in other locations around the world. The dance developed in response to multiple cultural elements, such as the crowding of the venue and even the fashions in clothing. The styles are mostly danced in either open embrace, where lead and follow have space between their bodies, or close embrace, where the lead and follow connect either chest-to-chest (Argentine tango) or in the upper thigh, hip area (American and International tango).

Different styles of tango are:

- Tango argentino
- Tango canyengue
- Tango fantasia
- Tango Liso
- Tango oriental
- Tango orillero
- Tango salon
- Tango camacupense (Angola)
- Tango milonguero (tango apilado) (see also "Milonguero")
- Tango nuevo (new tango)
- Tango vals (Tango waltz)
- Milonga
- Ballroom tango
- Finnish tango
- Uruguayan tango
- Maxixe (Brazilian tango)

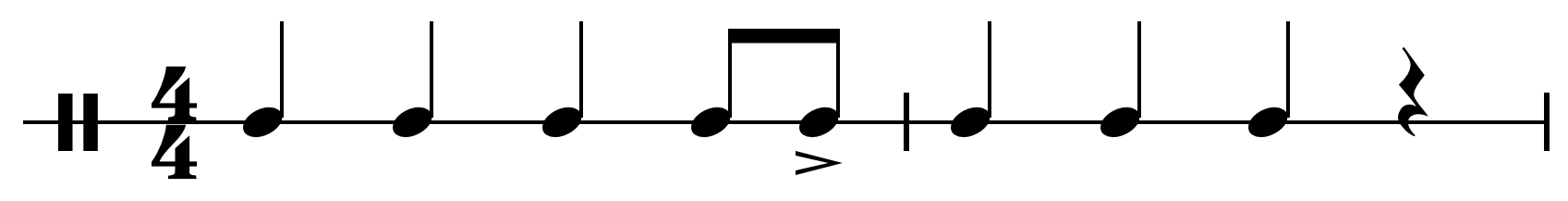
Tango rhythm.

These are danced to several types of music:

- Tango
- Electronic tango-inspired music (Tango electronico)
- "Alternative tango", i.e. music that is an alternative to tango, or non-tango music employed for use in tango-inspired dance

The milonguero style is characterized by a close embrace, small steps, and syncopated rhythmic footwork. It is based on the petitero or caquero style of the crowded downtown clubs of the 1950s.

In contrast, the tango that originated in the family clubs of the suburban neighborhoods (Villa Urquiza, Devoto, Avellaneda, etc.) emphasizes long elegant steps, and complex figures. In this case the embrace may be allowed to open briefly, to permit the execution of the complex footwork.

The complex figures of this style became the basis for a theatrical performance style of tango seen in the touring stage shows. For stage purposes, the embrace is often open, and the complex footwork is augmented with gymnastic lifts, kicks, and drops.

A newer style sometimes called tango nuevo, or "new tango," has been popularized in recent years by a younger generation of dancers. The embrace is often quite open and elastic, permitting the leader to lead a large variety of complex figures. This style is often associated with those who enjoy dancing to jazz- and techno-tinged "alternative tango" music, in addition to traditional tango compositions.

=== Tango canyengue ===
Tango canyengue is a rhythmic style of tango that originated in the early 1900s and is still popular today. It is one of the original roots styles of tango and contains all fundamental elements of traditional Tango from the River Plate region (Uruguay and Argentina). In tango canyengue the dancers share one axis, dance in a closed embrace, and with the legs relaxed and slightly bent. Tango canyengue uses body dissociation for the leading, walking with firm ground contact, and a permanent combination of on- and off-beat rhythm. Its main characteristics are its musicality and playfulness. Its rhythm is described as "incisive, exciting, provocative".

The complex figures of this style became the basis for a theatrical performance style of Tango seen in the touring stage shows. For stage purposes, the embrace is often very open, and the complex footwork is augmented with gymnastic lifts, kicks, and drops.

=== Tango nuevo ===
A newer style sometimes called tango nuevo or 'new tango' was popularized after 1980 by a younger generation of musicians and dancers. Ástor Piazzolla, composer and virtuoso of the bandoneón (so-called "tango accordion") played a major role in the innovation of traditional tango music. The embrace is often quite open and elastic, permitting the leader to initiate a great variety of complex figures. This style is often associated with those who enjoy dancing to jazz- and techno-tinged, electronic and alternative music inspired in old tangos, in addition to traditional Tango compositions.

Tango nuevo is largely fueled by a fusion between tango music and electronica (electrotango), though the style can be adapted to traditional tango and even non-tango songs. Gotan Project released its first tango fusion album in 2000, quickly following with La Revancha del Tango in 2001. Bajofondo Tango Club, a Rioplatense music band consisting of seven musicians from Argentina and Uruguay, released their first album in 2002. Tanghetto's album Emigrante (electrotango) appeared in 2003 and was nominated for a Latin Grammy in 2004. These and other electronic tango fusion songs bring an element of revitalization to the tango dance, serving to attract a younger group of dancers.

=== New tango songs ===
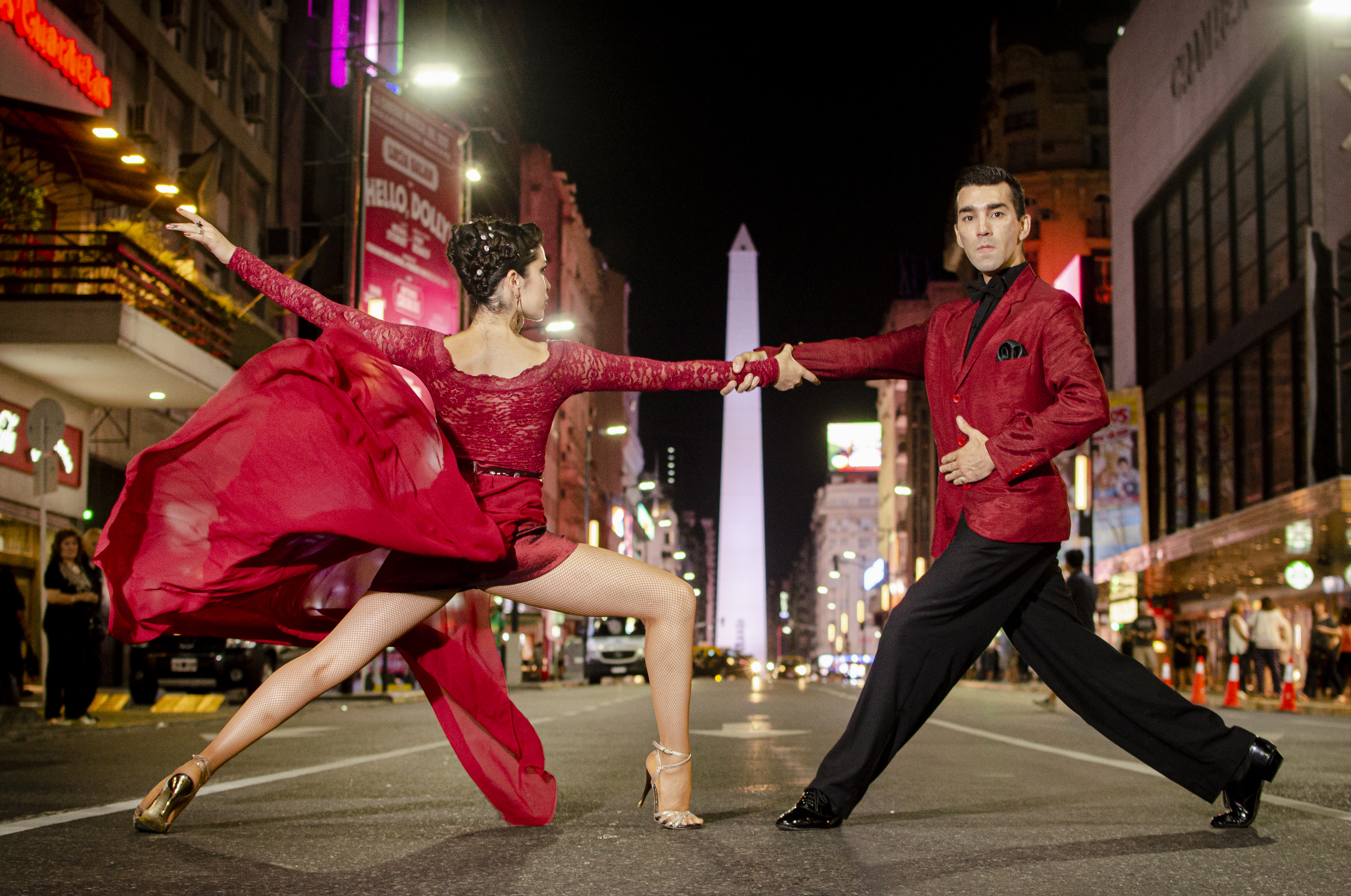
Tango Porteño. Two Argentine tango street dancers in Corrientes street, Buenos Aires, 2020.

In the second half of the 1990s, a movement of new tango songs was born perner in Buenos Aires. It was mainly influenced by the old orchestra style rather than by Piazzolla's renewal and experiments with electronic music. The novelty lies in the new songs, with today's lyrics and language, which find inspiration in a wide variety of contemporary styles.

In the 2000s, the movement grew with prominent figures such as the Orquesta típica Fernandez Fierro, whose creator, Julián Peralta, would later start Astillero and the Orquesta Típica Julián Peralta. Other bands also have become part of the movement such as the Orquesta Rascacielos, Altertango, Ciudad Baigón, as well as singer and songwriters Alfredo "Tape" Rubín, Victoria di Raimondo, Juan Serén, Natalí de Vicenzo and Pacha González.

=== Ballroom tango ===
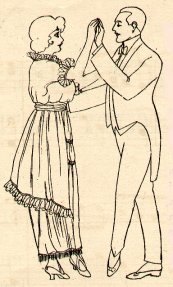
Ballroom tango illustration, 1914.

Ballroom tango, divided in recent decades into the "International" and "American" styles, has descended from the tango styles that developed when the tango first went abroad to Europe and North America. The dance was simplified, adapted to the preferences of conventional ballroom dancers, and incorporated into the repertoire used in International Ballroom dance competitions. English tango was first codified in October 1922, when it was proposed that it should only be danced to modern tunes, ideally at 30 bars per minute (i.e. 120 beats per minute – assuming a 4/4 measure).

Subsequently, the English tango evolved mainly as a highly competitive dance, while the American tango evolved as a non-judged social dance with an emphasis on leading and following skills. This has led to some principal distinctions in basic technique and style. Nevertheless, there are quite a few competitions held in the American style, and mutual borrowing of technique and dance patterns is a common practice.

Ballroom tangos use different music and styling from the tangos from the River Plata region (Uruguay and Argentina), with more staccato movements and the characteristic head snaps. The head snaps are totally foreign to Argentine and Uruguayan tango, and were introduced in 1934 under the influence of a similar movement in the legs and feet of the tango from the River Plate, and the theatrical movements of the pasodoble. This style became popular in Germany and was soon introduced to England. The movements were popular with spectators, but not with competition judges.

=== Other national styles ===
==== Brazilian tango ====
Brazilian tango developed simultaneously with Rioplatense tango and from similar influences, such as Candomblé and the African-derived lundu, the Cuban habanera, Andalusian tango, and the European polka and mazurka.

Brazilian tango evolved into the maxixe (a style known as Brazilian tango) and choro, with performers such as Ernesto Nazareth and Chiquinha Gonzaga. Nazareth began by playing "tangos" and later transcribed his scores as chorinho, under pressure from record companies, "which wanted to transmute Brazilian tango into chorinho and samba". Chiquinha Gonzaga, by contrast, continued composing tangos, tango-choros, waltzes, mazurkas, gavottes, polkas, and habaneras, in Brazilian style.

Brazilian tango has continued to have important composers such as Lina Pesce, David Nasser, José Fernandes, Nelson Gonçalves, and others, especially in the regions of southern Brazil, particularly in the state of Rio Grande do Sul.

==== Tango in Colombia ====
Tango in Colombia became very popular in the early 20th century, when numerous Argentine artists arrived in the country. The city of Medellín, specifically, became one of the capitals of tango outside Argentina and Uruguay. The city has a large number of bars dedicated to the genre, as does the rest of Colombia. In the 1930s tango began to become more popular and spread throughout the rest of the national territory. A historic event was the death of Carlos Gardel in Medellín in 1935 in an aviation accident. Today, Colombia hosts the Colombia Tango Festival, an international event devoted to the genre held in Manizales, the Festival Anual del Tango in Medellín, and the University Tango Festival.

==== Tango in Chile ====
From the first decades of the 20th century, tango was danced both in the Chilean capital, Santiago, and—especially—in the port city of Valparaíso, where enthusiasm for the arrabalero style of dancing still continues.

Among Chilean tango figures or those closely linked to Chilean culture are Cátulo Castillo, who lived in Chile until the age of 16, the bandoneon player Gabriel Clausi (El Chula), who settled with his orchestra in Viña del Mar between 1944 and 1953 and composed the tango "En un rincón del café". In Clausi's orchestra the tango singers Jorge Abril and Chito Faró stood out. The latter, author of the famous waltz "Si vas para Chile", also composed several tangos, among them the widely known "Matecito de plata".

But in Chilean tango, the figure who stands out above all is Porfirio Díaz—also the author of the classic Chilote folk song "Viejo lobo chilote"—who dominated the world of tango in Chile with his own orchestra from the late 1930s onward.

Among the recommended works is the album Tango/Chile, by Chula Clausi's orchestra, which brings together recordings made in Chile for RCA between 1944 and 1948.

==== Finnish tango ====
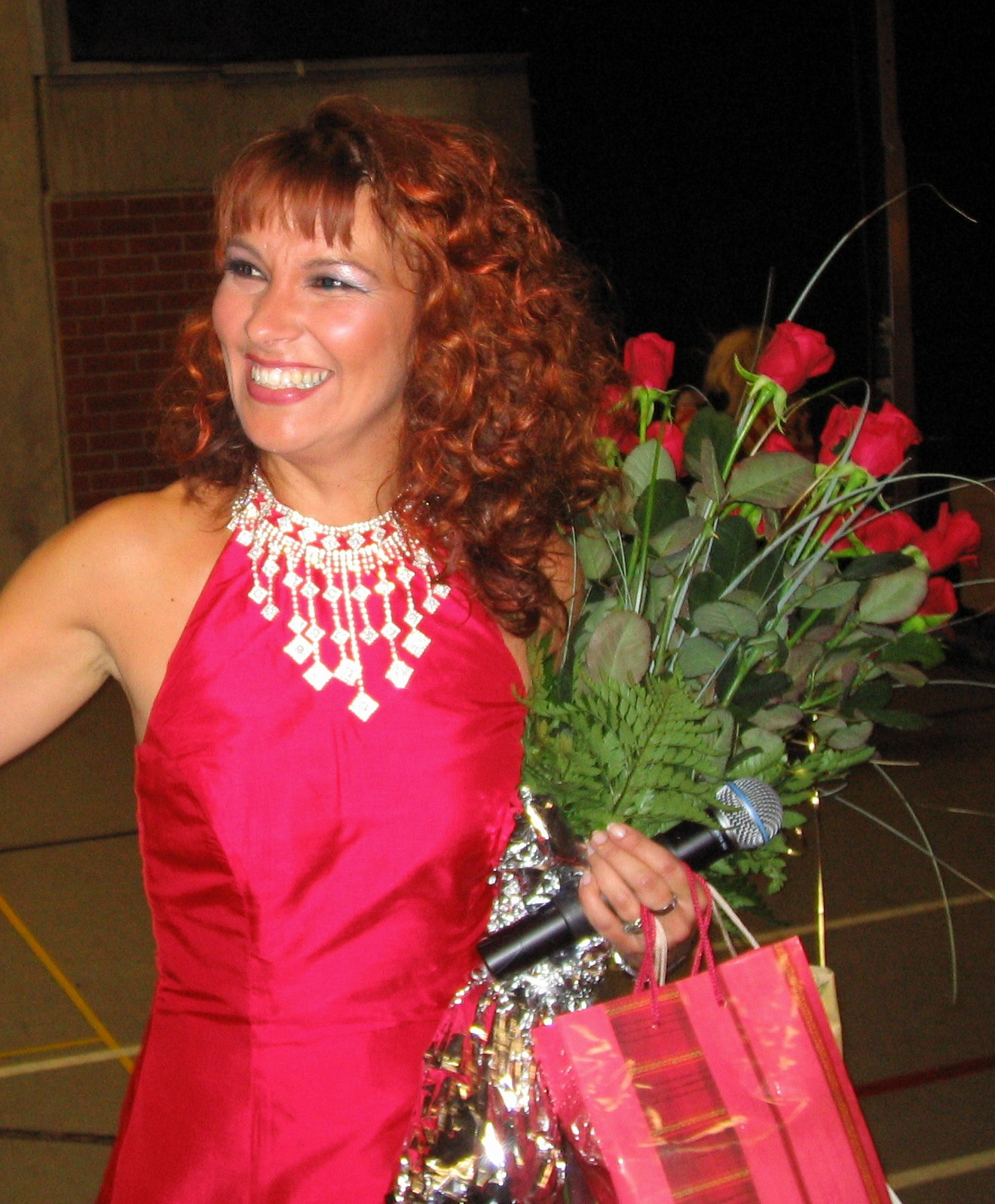
Arja Koriseva at the 2004 Tangomarkkinat in Seinäjoki, Finland.

Finnish tango began to take on distinctive characteristics in the 1930s. It differs from other variants by being performed almost exclusively in minor keys and in themes that reflect conventions established in Finnish folklore. One of its highlights is the Tangomarkkinat, or tango festival, held annually since 1985 in Seinäjoki, considered by Finnish tango enthusiasts to be the second city of tango after Buenos Aires. Among the leading artists are Olavi Virta (1915–1972) and Unto Mononen (1930–1968). According to the article "Finlandia canta el tango como ninguna", tango arrived in Finland from France and Germany beginning in 1910; according to oral tradition, a Danish dancing couple first demonstrated how tango was danced there in 1913. The Uruguayan musicologist Adriana Santos Melgarejo wrote this journalistic overview of tango in Finland, framing it with reference to the work of other researchers.

Tango spread from the dominant urban dance form to become hugely popular across Finland in the 1950s after World War I and World War II. The melancholy tone of the music reflects the themes of Finnish folk poetry; Finnish tango is almost always in a minor key.

Tango is danced in close full thigh, pelvis and upper body contact in a wide and strong frame, and features smooth horizontal movements that are strong and determined. Dancers are low, allowing long steps without any up and down movement, although rises and falls are optional in some styles. Forward steps land heel first except when descending from a rise, and in backward steps dancers push from the heel. In basic steps, the passing leg moves quickly to rest for a moment close to the grounded leg. Dips and rotations are typical. There is no open position, and typically feet stay close to the floor, except in dips the follower might slightly raise the left leg. Unlike in some Argentine-Uruguayan tango styles, in Finnish tango there is no kicking of any kind, and there are no aerials.

The annual Finnish tango festival Tangomarkkinat draws over 100,000 tango fans to the central Finnish town of Seinäjoki; the town also hosts the Tango Museum.

==== Tango in other countries ====
- Tango liscio, typical of Italy.
- Ukrainian tango.

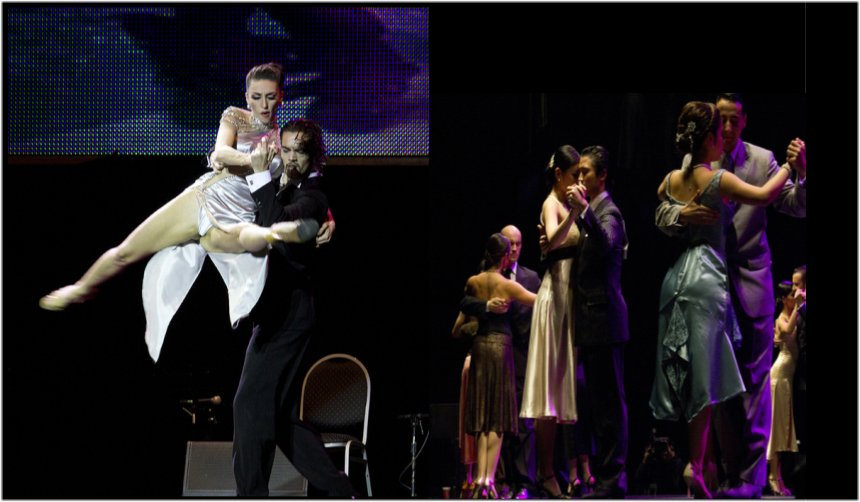
World tango dance tournament. It is held annually in August in Buenos Aires, with competition in two categories: stage tango (left) and salon tango (right).

== Comparison of techniques ==
A Dutch tango demonstration film, showing French Tango", the "Argentina", the "Promenade", the "Reserve Wave" and the "Habanera", Haarlem, 1930.

Argentine-Uruguayan and ballroom tango use very different techniques. In Argentine and Uruguayan tango, the body's center moves first, then the feet reach to support it. In ballroom tango, the body is initially set in motion across the floor through the flexing of the lower joints (hip, knee, ankle) while the feet are delayed, then the feet move quickly to catch the body, resulting in snatching or striking action that reflects the staccato nature of this style's preferred music.

In tango, the steps are typically more gliding, but can vary widely in timing, speed, and character, and follow no single specific rhythm. Because the dance is led and followed at the level of individual steps, these variations can occur from one step to the next. This allows the dancers to vary the dance from moment to moment to match the music (which often has both legato and/or staccato elements) and their mood.

The Tango's frame, called an abrazo or "embrace", is not rigid, but flexibly adjusts to different steps, and may vary from being quite close, to offset in a "V" frame, to open. The flexibility is as important as is all movement in dance. The American Ballroom Tango's frame is flexible too, but experienced dancers frequently dance in closed position: higher in the elbows, tone in the arms and constant connection through the body. When dancing socially with beginners, however, it may be better to use a more open position because the close position is too intimate for them. In American Tango open position may result in open breaks, pivots, and turns which are quite foreign in Argentine tango and International (English) tango.

There is a closed position as in other types of ballroom dance, but it differs significantly between types of tango. In Tango from the River Plata region, the "close embrace" involves continuous contact at the full upper body, but not the legs. In American Ballroom tango, the "close embrace" involves close contact in the pelvis or upper thighs, but not the upper body. Followers are instructed to thrust their hips forward, but pull their upper body away and shyly look over their left shoulder when they are led into a "corte".

In tango from the River Plate region, the open position, the legs may be intertwined and hooked together, in the style of Pulpo (the Octopus). In Pulpo's style, these hooks are not sharp, but smooth ganchos.

In tango from the River Plate, the ball or toe of the foot may be placed first. Alternatively, the dancer may take the floor with the entire foot in a cat-like manner. In the international style of tango, "heel leads" (stepping first onto the heel, then the whole foot) are used for forward steps.

Ballroom tango steps stay close to the floor, while the River Plate tango (Uruguayan and Argentine) includes moves such as the boleo (allowing momentum to carry one's leg into the air) and gancho (hooking one's leg around one's partner's leg or body) in which the feet travel off the ground. Both Uruguayan and Argentine tango features other vocabulary foreign to ballroom, such as the parada (in which the leader puts his foot against the follower's foot), the arrastre (in which the leader appears to drag or be dragged by the follower's foot), and several kinds of sacada (in which the leader displaces the follower's leg by stepping into her space).

== Famous tango singers ==
- Carlos Acuña^{[TT]} ^{[t.i]} (1915–1999) was known for his deep, high and expressive voice. His foreign travels brought him success in Uruguay, Mexico, Italy and Spain, where he became a close friend of the exiled Juan Perón.
- Néstor Fabián^{[TT]}
- Carlos Gardel^{[t.i]}
- Roberto Goyeneche^{[TT]} ^{[t.i]}
- Julio Sosa^{[TT]} ^{[t.i]} (1926–1964) from Uruguay was one of the most important tango singers during tango's unhappy years in the 1950s and early 1960s. His passion for poetry led to his sole published book; his passion for fast cars led to his young death.
- Olavi Virta
- Reijo Taipale
- Eino Grön
- Tita Merello^{[TT]}
- Edmundo Rivero^{[TT]}
- Pyotr Leschenko

== Tango influence ==
Outdoor milonga tango dance party in the gazebo at Lake Merritt, Oakland, California, 2007.

Music and dance elements of tango are popular in activities related to gymnastics, figure skating, synchronized swimming, etc., because of its dramatic feeling and its cultural associations with romance.

For the 1978 FIFA World Cup in Argentina, Adidas designed a ball and named it Tango, likely a tribute to the host country of the event. This design was also used in 1982 FIFA World Cup in Spain as Tango Málaga, and in 1984 and 1988 UEFA European Football Championships in France and West Germany.

== In society ==
Tango appears in different aspects of society: regular milongas and special festivals. A famous festival is the Tango Buenos Aires Festival y Mundial in Buenos Aires also known as World tango dance tournament. On a regional level there are also a number of festivals inside and outside of Argentina. One local festival outside Argentina is Buenos Aires in the Southern Highlands in Australia.

== Gender and tango ==
Gender roles play a big part in the mechanics of tango due to the tango needing a leader. But in more recent times this has been challenged due to more women not wanting to be dependent on the male for the dance. In the early 1900s, due to a surplus of male dancers, the dance was often performed between two men. This allowed for both men to learn the leading and following roles of tango and to adapt to leading equally in the dance. This changed the mechanics of the dance to be closer to two equally leading roles between men and women or same sex pairs.

A Queer Tango movement has emerged from the first Queer Tango Festival, held in Hamburg in 2001, to counter conformity to the traditional male-leader, female-follower convention.

== In film ==
Tango was central to Argentine cinema from the arrival of sound, as the country's first optical-sound feature, ¡Tango! (1933), was built around popular tango performers, and the tango-based melodrama (Spanish: melodrama tanguero) became the first defined genre of the Golden Age of Argentine cinema.

Argentine tango is the main subject in these films:

- ¡Tango! (1933)
- Adiós Buenos Aires (1938)
- Tangos, the Exile of Gardel (1985), starring Philippe Léotard, directed by Fernando Solanas
- Tango Bar (1988), starring Raúl Juliá
- The Tango Lesson (1997), starring Sally Potter and Pablo Verón, directed by Sally Potter
- Tango (1998), starring Cecilia Narova and Mía Maestro, directed by Carlos Saura
- Assassination Tango (2002), starring Robert Duvall, Rubén Blades and Kathy Baker, directed by Robert Duvall
- Orquesta Típica (2005), documentary film about typical orchestra Fernandez Fierro, directed by Nicolas Entel
- 12 Tangos – Adios Buenos Aires (2005), directed by Arne Birkenstock
- Tango libre (2012), directed by Frédéric Fonteyne
- Vaje v objemu / Practice in embrace (2012), directed by Metod Pevec

A number of films show tango in several scenes, such as:

- The Threepenny Opera (Die 3-Groschen-Oper) (1931), directed by G. W. Pabst, has number called Tango Ballade.
- The Plow That Broke the Plains (1936), directed by Pare Lorentz.
- The Four Horsemen of the Apocalypse (1921), starring Rudolph Valentino and Alice Terry, directed by Rex Ingram.
- L'amore in città (1953), segment "Paradise for three hours" (Paradiso per tre ore), directed by Dino Risi, starring nonprofessional actors, featuring a long sequence in a ballroom, where a passionate tango of Mario Nascimbene is played.
- Il Conformista (1970), starring Jean-Louis Trintignant and Dominique Sanda, directed by Bernardo Bertolucci.
- Last Tango in Paris (1972), starring Marlon Brando and Maria Schneider, directed by Bernardo Bertolucci.
- The World's Greatest Lover (1977), starring Gene Wilder (who also directed), Carol Kane and Dom DeLuise.
- Valentino (1977 film), starring Rudolf Nureyev features a fictional encounter between Valentino and the famous ballet dancer Vaslav Nijinsky (played by Anthony Dowell), where the two men dance together the tango.
- Death on the Nile (1978), Peter Ustinov and Olivia Hussey tango whilst David Niven is the unfortunate partner to Angela Lansbury's rather eccentric version of the dance.
- Tango (1981), a short animation film by Zbigniew Rybczynski. Received an Oscar for Best Animated Short Film, Academy Awards 1982.
- Never Say Never Again (1983), starring Sean Connery and Kim Basinger, directed by Irvin Kershner.
- Naked Tango (1990), starring Vincent D'Onofrio and Mathilda May, directed by Leonard Schrader.
- Scent of a Woman (1992), Al Pacino as blind Colonel dances Argentine tango.
- Strictly Ballroom (1992), directed by Baz Luhrmann.
- Addams Family Values (1993), Raul Julia and Anjelica Huston dance a tango so passionate that it literally burns the floor and makes all the champagne bottles in the nightclub pop their corks.
- Schindler's List (1993), starring Liam Neeson.
- True Lies (1994), starring Arnold Schwarzenegger, Jamie Lee Curtis and Tia Carrere, directed by James Cameron.
- Evita (1996), Madonna and Antonio Banderas dance a ballroom tango.
- Happy Together (1997), directed by Wong Kar-wai.
- Moulin Rouge! (2001), featuring Ewan McGregor and "El Tango de Roxanne".
- Waking Life (2001), directed by Richard Linklater.
- Le Tango Des Rashevski (2002).
- Chicago (2002), starring Renée Zellweger, Catherine Zeta-Jones, and Richard Gere, directed by Rob Marshall includes a song titled "Cell Block Tango" and is accompanied with a dance.
- Frida (2002), Salma Hayek and Ashley Judd dance a tango to the Lila Downs performed song "Alcoba Azul".
- Tango un giro extraño (2004), starring Dolores Solá, La chicana, Silvio Grand, Marinero Montes, directed by Mercedes Garcia Guevara.
- Shall We Dance (2004), starring Richard Gere, Jennifer Lopez and Susan Sarandon, directed by Peter Chelsom.
- Madonna featured choreography inspired by the Argentine tango styles for the Die Another Day section of her 2004 Re-Invention Tour. Segments of the 2005 documentary I'm Going To Tell You A Secret show this choreography in use.
- Rent (2005) had Anthony Rapp and Tracie Thoms perform a semi-elaborate ballroom tango in the song "Tango:Maureen" to describe their emotional relations and issues over a promiscuous girl they both dated.
- Mad Hot Ballroom (2005), documentary directed by Marilyn Agrelo.
- Love and Other Disasters (2006), Jacks (Brittany Murphy) and Paolo (Santiago Cabrera) perform a tango together.
- Take the Lead (2006), starring Antonio Banderas, directed by Liz Friedlander.
- Tanghi Argentini, Oscar nominated short film by Guy Thys, starring Dirk Van Dijck and Koen van Impe
- Another Cinderella Story (2008), starring Selena Gomez and Drew Seeley. Performed during the Black and White Ball in the scene where Mary drops her Zune.
- Easy Virtue (2008), in which Jessica Biel and Colin Firth dance a tango.
- Step Up 3D (2010), in which Rick Malambri, Sharni Vinson and some of the supporting characters at a ballroom dance a tango to Jazmine Sullivan's Bust Your Windows.
- Pixilation II (2011), short animation film by Kambras.
- Tango Libre (2012) starring François Damiens and Anne Paulicevich, directed by Frédéric Fonteyne
- Two to Tango (2021), directed by Dimitri Sterckens
- Eve (South Korean TV series) (2022), She seduces Kang Yoon-kyum by dancing tango, and approaches by teaching tango to another chaebol owner. It connects with each other through the memories of Argentina's tango and bandoneon, comforting the soul.

Finnish tango is featured to a greater or lesser extent in the following films:

- Onnen maa (1993), starring Pertti Koivula and Katariina Kaitue, directed by Markku Pölönen.
- Levottomat (2000), starring Mikko Nousiainen and Laura Malmivaara, directed by Aku Louhimies.
- Tulitikkutehtaan tyttö (1990), starring Kati Outinen, directed by Aki Kaurismäki.
- Mies vailla menneisyyttä (2002), starring Markku Peltola and Kati Outinen, directed by Aki Kaurismäki.
- Varjoja paratiisissa (1986), starring Matti Pellonpää and Kati Outinen, directed by Aki Kaurismäki.
- Kuutamolla (2002), starring Minna Haapkylä and Laura Malmivaara, directed by Aku Louhimies.
- Tango Kabaree (2001), starring Martti Suosalo and Aira Samulin, directed by Pekka Lehto.
- Minä soitan sinulle illalla (1954), starring Olavi Virta, directed by Armand Lohikoski.
