= Tango Liso =

Type of Tango

Tango Liso ("smooth tango") is a style of tango developed in Buenos Aires, Argentina between 1905 and 1910. It is primarily characterized by more Europeanized smooth, flowing movements and lack of the more exaggerated and aggressive steps of earlier tango styles.

== History ==
=== Tango Liso Buenos Aires ===
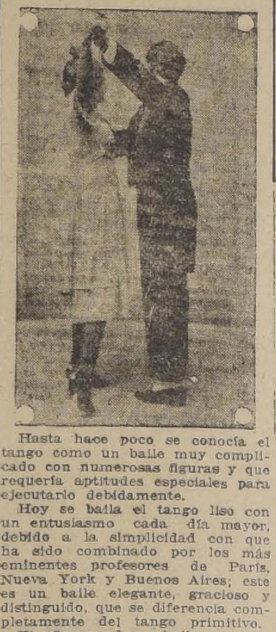
La Nacion(Buenos Aires News Paper) Excerpt about Tango Liso

Tango liso emerged as tango spread from the arrabales (outskirt districts) of Buenos Aires to the dance halls frequented by Italian immigrants. These dance halls were small, more centrally located, and catered to a poorer but more genteel Italian clientele. The combination of new untrained dancers who were unfamiliar with the African rhythms of earlier tango styles and the over-crowded dancehalls caused the rowdy and aggressive cortes y quebradas (cuts and breaks) of the earlier tango styles to be subdued in these settings, keeping only the most ‘basic’ tango steps and figures such as caminadas, ochos(figure-eight patterns), molinetes, etc.

Tango liso introduced a general quality of "fatigue" and more monotonous and previsible figures for the enjoyment of all the bodies who could not afford the more demanding forms of earlier tango styles. Traditional tangueros despised tango liso due to its reduced improvisational motifs, but some practitioners saw interesting features in this more democratic, local tango offspring. Later variations of tango liso were sometimes performed with "cutting" to retain some of the character of the earlier tango styles.

This Italization present in the creation of tango liso was also reflected in the music with the(shortlived) use of instruments like the mandolin and accordion in some of the primitive tango bands. Professional dancers working in Italian dance halls and dance academies further refined tango liso, contributing to its eventual evolution into ballroom tango. Tango de salon was another offshoot of tango liso and reintroduced some of the intensification that tango liso removed.

=== Tango Liso Paris ===
By the beginning of the 20th century the so-called tangomania was in full effect. Tango was applauded and celebrated in Paris, with more than one hundred Paris academies teaching it. The more familiar Europeanized style of tango liso made it popular in the more cultured and refined sectors of the Belle Époque. The popularity of Tango Liso in Paris helped to elevate the status of tango and contributed to its eventual reintroduction and acceptance by the Argentinian elite.

== Characteristics ==
- Smooth, simplified choreography
- Emphasis on walking steps (caminada), and occasionally incorporating ochos (figure-eight patterns)
- Absence of the aggressive and suggestive steps found in earlier styles of tango
- Good posture keeping a vertical torso
- Elimination of taconeo (Andalusian heel-stamping)
- Feet had to remain flush to the ground
- Knees are only slightly softened
- Partners remain offset to their right
- Cycle between close-embrace and open-embrace
- A few tiny steps forward then circling with much of the couple-rotation being of the rotary-tango type, waiting for space to open up through the crowd
- Boleos, ganchos, sacadas, sentadas, and other fancy moves and acrobatics are not done

== Cultural impact ==
The simplification and Europeanization that created tango liso allowed for broader acceptance and tango's rise in popularity in Europe and eventually back in Argentina. Tango liso also paved the way for the codification of tango in dance instruction books which helped to establish the basic steps and techniques of ballroom tango. This Italian influence that created tango liso also gave rise to lunfardo, an expressive Italian-based language used by the writers of tango lyrics. Like tango, lunfardo later became an integral part of the identity and culture of Buenos Aires.

== See also ==
- Argentine tango
- Finnish tango
