= World tango dance tournament =

Annual competition of Argentine Tango, held in Buenos Aires, Argentina

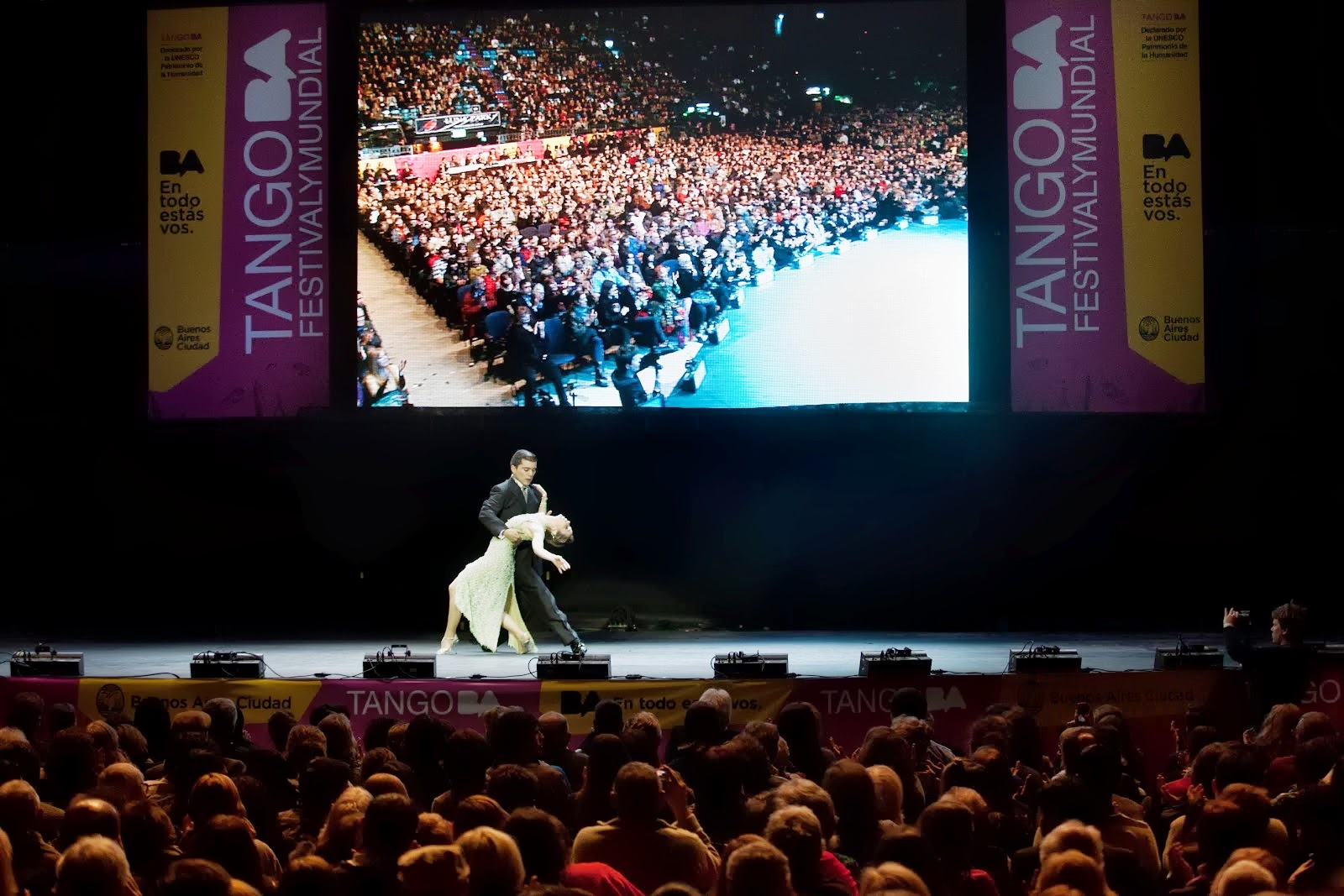
World tango dance tournament 2012 in Buenos Aires, Argentina

The World tango dance tournament (in Spanish: Campeonato Mundial de Baile de Tango, also known as Mundial de Tango) is an annual competition of Argentine Tango, held in Buenos Aires, Argentina, usually in August, as part of the Buenos Aires Tango Festival organized by the city's government. In 2014 the events were between 13-26/August.

The competition consists of two categories: "Tango de Pista" (Salon Tango), which has strict rules about the usage of traditional milonga figures, and "Tango Escenario" (Stage Tango), which is more choreographic and includes elements from other dance disciplines, such as ballet. Previously the competition was only open to couples consisting of men and women but in 2013 the rules were relaxed to allow same gender couples (man dancing with man, or woman with woman) to enter the competition.

The World Cup competition is the final leg of a series of pre-competitions held around the world starting from March. Traditionally the city of Buenos Aires and various municipalities choose their own "Municipal" champions who get wildcards into the final rounds. The same wildcard advantage is also given to national or regional champions of recognized competitions; These include Uruguay (UY), Chile (Cali, CL), Colombia (Bogota, CO), Brazil (Rio de Janeiro, BR), USA (San Francisco, US), Russia (Moscow, RU), China (Nanjing, CN), Japan (Tokyo, JP), Korea (Seoul, KR), France (Paris, FR), United Kingdom (London, UK), EU (Campeonato Europeo, Italy).

New municipalities in 2016: Turkey and the region (Istanbul, TR).

The first edition of the Mundial de Tango competition was held in 2003.

A closely related and highly influential event is the Buenos Aires City competition. The competition rules state that members of the couple must both have "DNI" (i.e. have a resident status of 2 years or more) in Argentina. The competition may be considered somewhat even more demanding because the participants can compete in several dance categories: either Tango Senior (age 40 or older) or Tango Adulto (age 18-39) plus Vals or Milonga. Only couples Carlos Estigarribia & María Laura Sastría (2015) and Jimena Hoffner & Fernando Carrasco (2008), have won the triple championship. The winners of the tango categories are granted direct access to the final qualifying round in Mundial de Tango. Couples in positions 2 through 5 are granted direct access to the semifinals in Mundial de Tango. These couples represent the city of Buenos Aires in the world cup. The City competition's winners and runners-up are likely to become highly regarded and sought out teachers worldwide.

Worth mentioning is the Campeonato inter milongas (CIM). In 2015 the milongas of Buenos Aires (El Fulgor de Villa Crespo, Salón Canning, Salón El Pial, Club Sunderland, Club Ciencia y Labor) started arranging monthly competitions whose final culminate in December. There are no restrictions in nationality or residence status of Argentina for the participants. The two monthly winning couples are voted for qualifying rounds and final by the audience and not selected judges.

== El Mundial de Tango Winners by year ==
Year	Category	Winner	Nationality
2026	Salon	Lucas Gauto and Naima Gerasopoulou: 2. Rodrigo Palacios and Indira Hiayes (AR), 3. London and Sol (KR)	Argentina / Greece
	Stage	Nicolas Schell and Nair Schinca: 2. Diego Ortega and Aldana Silveyra (AR), 3. Facundo Cabral and Mara Navarro (AR)	Argentina
2025	Salon	Diego Ortega and Aldana Silveyra: 2. Lucas Gauto and Naima Gerasopoulou (AR/GR) 3. Juan David Vargas and Ornella Simonetto (AR).	Argentina
	Stage	Leandro Bojko and Micaela Garcia: 2. Fede Ibañez and Nuria Lazo (AR). 3. Facundo Cabral and Mara Navarro (AR)	Argentina
2024	Salon	Brenno Marques and Fatima Caracoch: 2. Diego Ortega and Aldana Silveyra (AR), 3. Juan David Vargas and Ornella Simonetto (AR).	Argentina
	Stage	Sebastián Martinez and Ayelen Morando: 2. Nelson Leiva and Evangelina Martinez. 3. Jesus Taborda and Carla Domínguez.	Argentina
2023	Salon	Suyay Quiroga and Jhonny Carvajal	Argentina Colombia
	Stage	Julián Sánchez and Bruna Estellita	Argentina
2022	Salon	Sebastián Bolivar and Cynthia Palacios Video	Argentina
	Stage	Ricardo Astrada and Conztanza Vieyto	Argentina
2021	Salon	Barbara Ferreyra and Agustín Agnez. Video	Argentina
	Stage	Yanina Muzyka and Emmanuel Casal.	Argentina
2019	Salon	Maksim Gerasimov and Agustina Piaggio. Video: 2. Diego Luciano Chandia and Suyay Quiroga (AR). 3. Dmitrii Astafev and Irina Ponomareva (RU)	Russia / Argentina
	Stage	Fernando Rodriguez and Estefanía Gómez. Video: 2. Julián Sanchez and Bruna Estellita (AR). 3. Nicolás Filipeli and Germán Filipeli (AR)	Argentina
2018	Salon	Jose Luis Salvo and Carla Rossi. Video: 2. Carlitos Estigarribia and Dana Zampieri (AR). 3. (Tie) Maksim Gerasimov and Agustina Piaggio (AR): Chandía Diego Luciano and Quiroga Suyay (AR)	Argentina
	Stage	Dmitry Vasin and Sagdiana Khamzina. Video: 2. Valentín Arias Delgado – Diana Franco Durango (CO). 3. Ángel Casal – Yanina Muzyka (AR)	Russia
2017	Salon	Germán Ballejo and Magdalena Gutiérrez. Video: 2. José Luis Salvo and Carla Rossi (AR), 3. Luis Romero and Ana Migoni (AR)	Argentina
	Stage	Axel Arakaki and Agostina Tarchinise. Video: 2. Simone Facchini and Gioia Abballe (IT), 3. Valentin Arias Delgado and Diana Franco Durango (CO)	Japan / Argentina
2016	Salon	Cristian Palomo and Melisa Sacchi. Video: 2. Carlos Estigarribia and María Laura Sastría (AR), 3. Lucas Gauto and Dana Zampieri (AR)	Argentina
	Stage	Hugo Mastrolorenzo and Agustina Vignau. Video: 2. Emmanuel Casal y Yanina Muzyca (AR), 3. Andres Uran y Estefania Arango (AR)	Argentina
2015	Salon	Jonathan Saavedra and Clarisa Aragón. Video: 2. Christian Palomo and Melisa Sacchi (AR), 3. Germán Ballejo and Magdalena Gutiérrez (AR)	Argentina
	Stage	Ezequiel Jesús Lopez and Camila Alegre. Video: 2. Juan Pablo Bulich and Rocío García Liendo (AR), 3. Hugo Mastrolorenzo and Daiana Pujol (AR)	Argentina
2014	Salon	Sebastián Acosta and Lorena González Cattaneo. Video: 2. Edwin Espinosa and Alexandra Yepes (CO), 3. Alexander Moncada Rojas and Alejandra Sanchez (CO)	Argentina / Uruguay
	Stage	Juan Malizia Gatti and Manuela Rossi. Video: 2. Hugo Mastrolorenzo and Agustina Vignau (AR), 3. Jesus Taborda and Shirley Xuanyi Xu (AR)	Argentina
2013	Salon	Maximiliano Cristiani and Jesica Arfenoni. Video: 2. Fernando Carrasco and Jimena Hoeffner (AR), 3. Juan Malizia Gatti and Manuela Rossi (AR)	Argentina
	Stage	Guido Palacios and Florencia Castilla. Video: 2. Nicolas Matias Schell and Macarena Schinca Rosas (AR), 3. Juan Pablo Bulich and Rocio García Liendo (AR)	Argentina
2012	Salon	Facundo de la Cruz Gómez Palavecino and Paola Sanz. Video: 2. Maximiliano Cristiani and Fatima Vitale (AR), 3. Diego Ortega and Aldana Silveyra (AR)	Argentina
	Stage	Cristian Sosa and María Noel Sciuto. Video: 2. Eber Burguer and Yesica Elias (AR), 3. Cristian Corea and Sabrina Amuchastegui (AR)	Argentina / Uruguay
2011	Salon	Diego Benavidez Hernández and Natasha Agudelo Arboleda: 2. John Erban and Clarissa Sánchez (VE), 3. Brian Nguyen and Yuliana Basmajyan (US)	Colombia
	Stage	Max Van De Voorde and Solange Acosta Cristian David Correa and Manuela Rossi (AR), 3. Eber Alejandro Burger and Yesica Lorena Lozano Elias Lanus (AR)	Argentina
2010	Salon	Sebastián Ariel Jimenez and María Inés Bogado. Video: 2. Diego Pérez and María Cantarini (AR), 3. Cristian López and Naoko Tsutsumisaki (JP)	Argentina
	Stage	Diego Ortega and Chizuko Kuwamoto: 2. Cristian David Correa and Manuela Rossi (AR), 3. Cristian Andres Lopez and Nao Tsutsumishita (JP)	Argentina / Japan
2009	Salon	Hiroshi Yamao and Kyoko Yamao: 2. Edwin Leon and Jenifert Arango Agudelo (CO), 3. Damian Mariño y Sara Parnigoni (AR)	Japan
	Stage	Jonathan Spitel and Betsabet Flores: 2. Cristian Correa and Manuela Rossi (AR), 3. Cristián Andrés López and Naoko Tsutsumizaki (JP)	Argentina
2008	Salon	Daniel Nacucchio and Cristina Sosa: 2. Neri Luciano Piliu and Yanina Valeria Quiñones (AR), 3. John Erban y Sofiani Figueroa (VE)	Argentina
	Stage	José Fernández and Melody Celatti. Video: 2. Maximiliano Cristiani and Maricel Giacomini (AR), 3. John Raigoza and Yaisuri Salamanca (CO)	Argentina
2007	Salon	Dante Sánchez and Inés Muzzopappa: 2. Javier Díaz and Cecilia Favaro (AR), 3. Maximiliano Cristiani and Maricel Giacomini (AR)	Argentina
	Stage	Fernando Gracia and Natalia Tonelli Attori: 2. Maximiliano Alvarado and Paloma Berrios (CL), 3. Hiroshi and Kyoko Yamao (JP)	Argentina
2006	Salon	Fabián Peralta and Natacha Poberaj: 2. Emilia Cerutti and Aoniken Quiroga (AR), 3. Diego Pérez and Soledad Cantarini (AR)	Argentina
	Stage	Carlos Alberto Paredes and Diana Giraldo Rivera: 2. Juan Gregorio Malizia Gatti and Florencia Roldán (AR), 3. Gonzalo Damian Cuello and Makiko Hirai (JP)	Colombia
2005	Salon	Sebastián Achával and Ximena Gallicchio Pedro Vujovich and Graciela Cano (AR), 3. Fabián Peralta and Natacha Poberaj (AR)	Argentina
	Stage	Germán Cornejo and María de los Angeles Trabichet: 2. Ryo and Chie Ikemoto (JP), 3. Roberto Castillo and Paula Ballesteros (AR)	Argentina
2004	Salon	Osvaldo Cartery and Luisa Inés Cartery: 2. Luciano Brigante and Karina Guillen (AR), 3. Edwin Chica Caro and Lina María Valencia de Cali (CO)	Argentina
	Stage	Iván Romero and Marcela Vespasiano: 2. Han Lee and Kyung A Han (KOR), 3. José Roberto Castillo and Paula Andrea Ballesteros (AR)	Argentina
2003	Salon	Enrique Husares and Gabriela Sanguinetti: 2. Enrique Grahl and Judith Zapatero (DE), Jorge Damián Mariño and Gabriela Trapanotto (AR)	Argentina
	Stage	Gaspar Godoy and Gisela Galeassi: 2. Maximiliano Avila and Elizabeth Guerrero (AR), 3. Roberto Castillo and Paula Andrea Ballesteros (AR)	Argentina

== Campeonato Metropolitano de Baile de Tango de Buenos Aires Winners by year ==
The Buenos Aires city competition is held in May in the capital of Argentina.

Year	Category	Winner
2019	Milongueros Del Mundo	Juliano Andrade and Paula Emerick
2019	Milonga	Fernando Jorge and Alexandra Baldaque
2017	Tango Senior	Oscar Brusco and Nina Chudoba.: 2. Eduardo Sosa and Andrea Acerbi, 3. Luis Dirassar and Patricia Vazquez
	Tango Adulto	Jose Luis Salvo u Carla Rossi.: 2. Sergio Daniel Bustos and Katherine Laiton Penagos, 3. Sergio Daniel Bustos and Katherine Laiton Penagos
	Vals	Diego Benitez and Rocio Vargas.: 2. David Mesa Pineda and Diana Diaz, 3. Emanuel Ledesma and Carolina Couto
	Milonga	Jose Luis Salvo and Carla Rossi.: 2. Darío Dario Artunduaga and Sonia Cantero, 3. Sergio Daniel Bustos and Katherine Laiton Penagos
2016	Tango Senior	Horacio Aspiroz and Sandra Curiel.: 2. N/A, 3. N/A
	Tango Adulto	Matias Batista Aleman and Silvana Prieto. Video: 2. N/A, 3. N/A
	Vals	Lucas Gauto and Dana Zampieri.: 2. N/A, 3. N/A
	Milonga	Ariel Taritolay and Yasmina Mamana.: 2. N/A, 3. N/A
2015	Tango Senior	Jorge Edgardo Balatti and Marcela Mónica Monzón. Video: 2. Horacio Aspiroz and Sandra Curial, 3. Ricardo Gimenez and Victoria Terella
	Tango Adulto	Carlos Javier Estigarribia and María Laura Sastría. Video: 2. Marcos Dario Pereira and María Florencia Borgnia, 3. Luis Oscar Mandagarán and Georgina Vargas
	Vals	Carlos Javier Estigarribia and María Laura Sastría. Video: 2. Ariel Manzanares and Antonella Sarago, 3. Alexander Sossa Benitez and Anel Marrón Cañas
	Milonga	Carlos Javier Estigarribia and María Laura Sastría. Video: 2. Julio Cesar Montoya Ardilla and Silvana Prieto, 3. Oscar Mandagarán and Georgina Vargas
2014	Tango Senior	Carlos Boeri and Alison Murray: 2. Sergio Antonio Fernandez and Flora Sanchez, 3. Ricardo Gimenez and Victoria Terella
	Tango Adulto	Frank Obregon and Jenny Gil (VE/VE): 2. Alejandro Luna and Maria Ayelen Maldonado, 3. Juan Malizia and Manuela Rossi
	Vals	Juan Malizia and Manuela Rossi: 2. Alejandro Luna and Maria Ayelen Maldonado, 3. Julio Montoya Ardila and Ana Lopera Vazquez
	Milonga	Leonardo Marcelo Ortiz and Carla Natalia Rossi: 2. Frank Obregon and Jenny Gil, 3. Julio Montoya Ardila and Ana Lopera Vazquez
2013	Tango Senior	Luis Anchava and Marta Doctorovich: 2. Luis Rojas and Sisana Ferrante, 3. Carlos Boeri and Alison Murray / Eduardo Bustillo and Svilitana Oleynik
	Tango Adulto	Fernando Carrasco and Jimena Hoffner: 2. Juan Malizia Gatti and Manuela Rossi, 3. Pablo Sebastián Zanchez and Malvina Gili
	Vals	Jimena Hoffner and Fernando Carrasco: 2. Juan Malizzi Gatti and Manuela Rossi, 3. Alejandro Beron and Verónica Vazquez
	Milonga	Fernando Carrasco and Jimena Hoffner: 2. Alejandro Beron and Verónica Vazquez, 3. Edison Chaves Aguillon and Rosa Tatiana Lopez Rodriguez
2012	Tango Senior	Hector Dohnke and Manuela Teresita Requena: 2. Ricardo Gimenez and Victoria de los Angeles Terella, 3. Luis Anchava and Marta Susana Doctorovich
	Tango Adulto	Maximiliano Miguel Cristiani and Fatima Vitale: 2. Ariel Manzanares and Daniela Florencia Galizia, 3. Alejandro Martin Luna and Maria Ayelen Maldonado
	Vals	Facundo Gomez Palavecino and Paola Florencia Sanz: 2. Julio Cesar Montoya Ardila and Ana Isabel Lopera Vazquez, 3. Ariel Manzanares and Daniela Florencia Galizia
	Milonga	Maximiliano Miguel Cristiani and Fatima Vitale: 2. Cristian Andres Lopez and Naoko Tsutsumizaki, 3. Facundo de la Cruz Gomez Palavecino and Paola Sanz
2011	Tango Senior	Romero Aldo Adrian and Carrizo Ana Lia: 2. Ricardo Gimenez and Victoria Terella, 3. Gustavo Sorel and Cristina Conderanne
	Tango Adulto	Pedro Ochoa and Natalia Almada: 2. Mario De Camillis and Barbara Wainnright, 3. Octavio Fernandez and Corina Herrera
	Vals	Mario De Camillis and Barbara Wainnright: 2. Alejandro Luna and Maria Maldonado, 3. Pedro Ochoa and Natalia Almada
	Milonga	Mario De Camillis and Barbara Wainnright: 2. Pedro Ochoa and Natalia Almada, 3. Carlos Estigarribia and Paula Rolón
2010	Tango Senior	Alberto Markus and Ana María Polito: 2. Ricardo Giménez and Victoria Terella, 3. Ricardo Sotelo and Norma N. Fernández
	Tango Adulto	Lucas Carrizo Lobo and María Paula Tejeda: 2. René Esteban Torres and Junko Mori, 3. Néstor Azorín and Jesica Arfenoni
	Vals	Ariel Sebastian Jiménez and María Inés Bogado: 2. Lucas Carrizo Lobo and María Paula Tejeda, 3. Alejandro Berón and Aldana Silveyra
	Milonga	Ariel Manzanares and Daniela Cerquides: 2. Alejandro Berón Fulgor and Aldana R. Silveyra, 3. Hernán A. Rodríguez and María Florencia Labiano
2009	Tango Senior	Néstor Castillo and Mónica Ponce: 2. Raúl Capelli and Gloria Pequera, 3. Sergio Fernández and Sara Sánchez
	Tango Adulto	Damián Mariño and Sara Parnigoni: 2. Fernando Galván and Gabriela, 3. Frank Obregón and Jenny Gil
	Vals	Cristian Sosa and Lida Mantovani: 2. Alejandro Berón and Aldana Silveyra, 3. Mario De Camillis and Bárbaro Wainnright
	Milonga	Cristian Sosa and Lida Mantovani: 2. Mario De Camillis and Bárbaro Wainnright, 3. Fernando Galván and Gabriela Herrera
2008	Tango Senior	Rubén Diez and Lidia Ofelia Casella: 2. Víctor Arciblades Romero and Noemí Norma Galli, 3. Francisco Allo and Olga Azucena Albasetti
	Tango Adulto	Daniel Nacucchio and Cristina Sosa: 2. Luciano Neri Piliu and Yanina Valeria Quiñónez, 3. Diego César Mohammad and Andrea Brizuela
	Vals	(category not included in the competition)
	Milonga	Daniel Nacucchio and Cristina Sosa: 2. Hernán Ariel Rodríguez and María Labiano, 3. José Luis Nicolás Panzitta and Claudia Caporaletti
2007	Tango Senior	(information not available)
	Tango Adulto	Javier Diaz and Cecilia Favaro
	Vals	(category not included in the competition)
	Milonga	Alejandro Hermida and Silvana Anfossi
2006	Tango Senior	(information not available)
	Tango Adulto	Pablo Rodriguez and Noelia Hurtado: 2. Ricardo Sotelo and Norma Fernández Chávez
	Vals	(category not included in the competition)
	Milonga	Bruno Mayo and Melisa Parra

== European Tango Championship (Buenos Aires preliminary) Winners by year ==
The competition is held at the beginning of July in Italy and results are reported by the European tango ASD organization.

Year	Category	Winner	Nationality
2019	Salon	Anton Popichenko y Elena Kiryanrova: 2. Dmitrii Astafev y Irina Ponomereva(RU),3. Artem Luchin y Irina Samoilova(RU)	Russia
2018	Salon	Maxim Gerasimov y Ekaterina Syrtsova	Russia
2017	Salon	João Carlos Santos David y Mirella Santos David (former Mirella van der Linden).: 2. Maksim Luchko y Natalia Luchko (RU), 3. Maksim Gerasimov y Iana Pelkhanova (RU)	Netherlands
	Stage	Maksim Luchko y Natalia Luchko: 2. N/A, 3. N/A	Russia
2016	Salon	Sergey Kurkatov and Luliia (Ylia) Burenicheva (Сергей Куркатов and Юлия Буреничева).: 2. Giampiero Cantone and Franceca Del Buono (IT), 3. Maksim Gerasimov and Maria Vasileva (RU)	Russia
	Stage	Giampiero Cantone and Franceca Del Buono: 2. Maksim Gerasimov and Maria Vasileva (RU), 3. Stanpoilidis Stelios and Despina Amarantidou (GR)	Italy
2015	Salon	Kicsi Csongor and Laura Iaru.: 2. Ruslan Takhirov and Natalia Atepaeva (RU), 3. Smirnov Alexsei and Julia Osina (RU)	Romania
	Stage	Parshakov Kirill and Gudyno Anna: 2. Gianpiero Cantone and Francesca Del Buono (IT), 3. Astafiev Dimitry and Taisia Finenkova (RU)	Russia
2014	Salon	Giuseppe Bianchi and Sabina Cipolla. Video: 2. Dmitry Astafiev and Olga Gritsenko (RU), 3. Vito Raffanelli and Olga Rossello (IT)	Italy
	Stage	Christos Bakopoulos and Maria Ziloti: 2. Remi Esterle and Cecile Rouanne (FR), 3. Giampiero Cantone and Francesca Del Buono (IT)	Greece
2013	Salon	Evangelos Hatzopoulos and Marianna Koutantou. Video: 2. Remi Esterle and Cecile Rouanne (FR), 3. Giampiero Cantone and Francesca Del Buono (IT)	Greece
	Stage	Simone Faccini and Gioia Abballe: 2. Stanislav Fursov and Ekaterina Simonova (RU), 3. Valentin Reshetnikov and Tasya finenkova (RU)	Italy
2012	Salon	Yannick Vanhove and Lieske (Liz) De Vuyst: 2. Evangelos Hatzopoulos and Marianna Koutandou (GR), 3. Dmitry Astafiev and Ksenia Koltysheva (RU)	Belgium
	Stage	Dmitry Vasin and Taisiya Finenkov: 2. Yannick Vanhove and Lieske De Vuyst (BE), 3. Simone Facchini and Gioia Abballe	Russia
2011	Salon	Fernando Silva and Alexandra Baldaque. Video: 2. German Prieto and Chiristina Del Campo Ortiz (ES), 3. Giampiero Cantone and Francesca Del Buono (IT)	Portugal
	Stage	Gabriel Marino and Elli Karadimou: 2. Nelson Pinto and Isabel Costa (PT), 3. Andrea Bassi/Alice Gaini (IT)	Greece
2010	Salon	Vladimir Khorev and Natasha Petrova: 2. Fernando Silva and Alexandra Baldaque	Russia
	Stage	Christina Sarioglou and Rojer Zalazar	Greece

== Argentine Tango UK Official Championship (Buenos Aires preliminary) Winners by year ==
The competition is held during May–June in London and the results are usually reported in Tangofolly community network.

Year	Category	Winner	Nationality
2018	Salon	Endre Szeghalmi and Andrea Serbán. Video: 2. Jory Raimo Boelhouwers and Lorena de Miranda Serra (NL), 3. Thomas Barbier and Leslie Folcarelli	Hungary / Romania
	Stage	N/A: 2. N/A, 3. N/A	
2017	Salon	João Carlos Santos David and Mirella Santos David. Video: 2. Jory Raimo Boelhouwers and Lorena de Miranda Serra (NL), 3. N/A	Netherlands
	Stage	Stan Lucian and Aldea Oana-Raluca. News. Video: 2. Jory Raimo Boelhouwers and Lorena de Miranda Serra (NL), 3. N/A	Romania
2016	Salon	Nikita Gerdt and Sophia Paul. News: 2. Joao Carlos David and Mirella Van der Linden, 3. Jory Boelhouwers and Lorena Serra (NL)	Germany
	Stage	N/A: 2. N/A, 3. N/A	
2015	Salon	Nikita Gerdt and Mirjam (Mimi) Hirsch. Video: 2. Jory Raimo Boelhouwers and Lorena de Miranda Serra (NL), 3. Matteo Manferdini and Kat Gorna (UK)	Germany
	Stage	Jory Boelhouwers and Lorena Serra. Video: 2. Joao Carlos David and Mirella van der Linden (NL), 3. N/A	Netherlands
2014	Salon	Alex Barberi and Manuela Marce. Video: 2. Jesus Rodriguez and Sophia Rodriguez (CH), 3. Jagoda Slawinska and Andre Maurice Gambra Vargas (ES)	United Kingdom / Spain
	Stage	Jakub Grzybek and Patrycja Cisowska-Grzybek: 2. Benny Maslov and Kat Gorna (UK), 3. N/A (not credited)	Poland

== Campionato Italiano di Tango Winners by year ==
These results are national tango championships of Italy held annually in the second week of July. Note that in 2015 the city of Rome started holding their own tango championships similar to Buenos Aires city championships.

Year	Category	Winner
2019	Salon	Alessandro Cavallaro and Marcella Monaco Video 2.Giuseppe Vento and Katia Spina, 3. Lorenzo Camplone and Irene Moroni
	Stage	Alessandro Cavallaro and Marcella Monaco Video: 2. Dennys Fernandez Escobar and Matilde Beccaria, 3. Giuseppe Vento and Katia Spina
2018	Salon	Riccardo Pagni and Giulia del Porro Video: 2. Giarola Massimo and Conti Michela, 3. Cavallaro Alessandro and Marcella Monaco
	Stage	Pasini Marco and Bettariga Mariana Video: 2. Cavallaro Alessandro and Marcella Monaco, 3.
2017	Salon	Dennys Escobar and Manuela D'Orazio Video: 2. Morra Ettore and Sara Ruggio, 3. Cavallaro Alessandro and Marcella Monaco
	Stage	Andrea Vighi and Chiara Benati Video: 2. Ciearfella Bruno and Alessandra Moro, 3. Mora Ettore and Sara Ruggio
2016	Salon	Julio Alvarez and Yallet Suarez. Video: 2. Pablo Ariel Mujica and Cinzia Sicali, 3. Marco Pasini and Mariana Bettariga
	Stage	Luca Morale and Francesca Santangelo: 2. Andrea Vighi and Chiara Benati, 3. Fabio Santarelli and Sara Paoli
2015	Salon	Bruno Ciarfella and Alessandra Moro. Video: 2. Luca Moraleand Francesca Santangelo, 3. Alessandro Cavallaro and Marcella Monaco
	Stage	Emanuela Benagiano and Michele Lobefaro: 2. Ludovica Antonietti and Matteo Antonietti, 3. Francesca Santangelo
2014	Salon	Alessio Altieri and Aretuza Viana. Video: 2. Vito Raffanelli and Giorgia Rossello, 3. Fabio Pinciroli and Porta Elisa
	Stage	Vito Raffanelli and Giorgia Rossello: 2. Michele Padovano and Paradiso Annanaria, 3. Matteo and Ludovica Antonietti
2013	Salon	Michele Lobefaro and Emanuela Benagiano: 2. Riccardo Ongari and Monica Biasin, 3. Luca Morale and Francesca Santangelo
	Stage	Giampiero Cantone and Francesca Del Buono: 2. Giovanissimi Simone Facchini and Gioia Abballe, 3. Vito Raffanelli and Giorgia Rossello
2012	Salon	Luciano Donda and Cinzia Lombardi: 2. Giuseppe Bianchi and Sabrina Cipolla, 3. Luca Morale and Francesca Santangelo
	Stage	Luciano Donda and Cinzia Lombardi: 2. Giampiero Cantone and Francesca Del Buono, 3. Simone Facchni and Gioia Abballe

== Argentine Tango USA Championship by year ==
These results are national tango championships of the USA. The event is held annually during the week of Easter.

Year	Category	Winner	Representing
2018	Salon	Carlos Urrego and Maureen Urrego: 2. Jevgeni Davidov and Natalia Sidorenco, 3.Daniel Moreno and Amanda Accica-Moreno	Seattle, Washington
	Stage	Michael Thomas and Miki Katherine: 2. Carlos Urrego and Maureen Urrego, 3. Lorenzo Lazure and Anna Radzikowska	Las Vegas, Nevada
2017	Salon	Ana Thomas and Michael Thomas Video: 2. (tie) Carlos Urrego and Maureen Urrego & Addis Messam and Krista Messam, 3. Derek Tang & Rachelle Lin	Las Vegas, Nevada
	Stage	Sean Ericson and Cynthia Gottlob Video: 2. Carlos Urrego and Maureen Urrego, 3. Roberto Peña and Jacklyn Shapiro.	Denver, Colorado
2016	Salon	Adam Cornett and Tilia Kimm: 2. Diego Gorostiaga and Kelly Lettieri 3. Derek Tang and Rachelle Lin	Boston, Massachusetts
	Stage	Daniel Moreno and Amanda Accica: 2. Martin Cardoso and Noelia Guerrero 3. Roberto Peña and Jacklyn Shapiro	Detroit, Michigan
2015	Salon	Ivan Troshhi and Yamila Viana: 2. Daniel Moreno and Delia Bordon 3. Johnny Nguyen and Lauren Woods	New York City, New York
	Stage	Ivan Troshhi and Yamila Viana: 2. Alexey Gavrilov and Aki Kudo 3. Roberto Peña and Jacklyn Shapiro	New York City, New York
2014	Salon	Nicholas Tapia and Stephanie Berg: 2. Jevgeni Davidov and Zoya Altmark 3. Jerry Perez and Amy Chang	Berkeley, California
	Stage	Jevgeni Davidov and Akiko Kudo: 2. Roberto Peña and Jackelyn Shapiro 3. Connor McClure and Caroline Trent	Edgewater, New Jersey
2013	Salon	Laurent Lazure and Naomi Hotta: 2. Leo Landa and Alona Gorer 3. Claudio Solorzano & Janine Rodrigues	Los Angeles, California
	Stage	Marcelo Molina and Carolina Vazquez: 2. Laurent Lazure & Naomi Hotta 3. Vanessa Montoya & Bradley Montoya	Fresno, California
2012	Salon	Ramada Salieri Cueva and Yumiko Krupenina: 2. Rommel Oramas and Daniela Borgialli 3. Nicholas Tapia and Amarkiran Kaur Singh	San Francisco, California
	Stage	Shawn Pikus and Olga Pisano: 2. Mirabai Deranja and Michael Kass	New York City, New York
2011	Salon	Brian Nguyen and Yuliana Basmajyan: 2. Ramada Salieri and Yumiko Krupenina 3. Gustavo and Jesica Hornos	Los Angeles, California
	Stage	Marcelo Molina and Carolina Vazquez: 2. Gustavo and Jesica Hornos	Fresno, California
