= Milonga (dance) =

Argentine dance style similar to tango

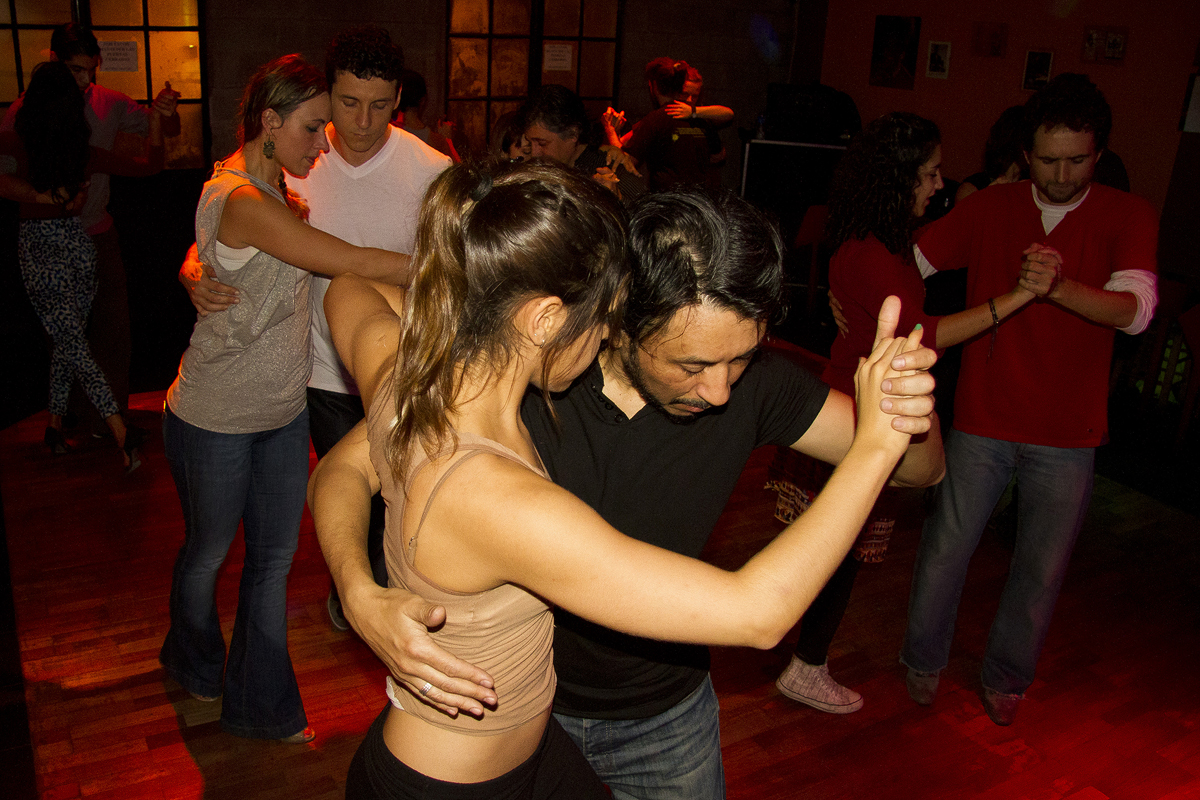
modern image of milonga being danced.

Milonga dance is dancing to milonga music.

== Technique ==
Milonga dance incorporates the same basic elements as Argentine tango but permits a greater relaxation of legs and body. Movement is normally faster, and pauses are less common. It is usually a kind of rhythmic walking without complicated figures, with a more humorous and rustic style in contrast with the serious and dramatic tango.

There are different styles of milonga: milonga lisa (simple milonga), in which the dancer steps on every beat of the music; and milonga con traspié, in which the dancer uses traspiés or contrapasos (changes of weight from one foot to the other and back again in double time or three steps in two beats) to interpret the music. The beat of milonga music is syncopated. It consists of 8 counts with the accents on the first, however it can also sometimes be on the second, additionally the accents are present on the fourth, fifth and seventh counts. Thus, dynamics may be danced without having to run fast or without the use of much space. Overall, milonga is danced in a faster pace than tango which makes this dance "unforgiving" regarding mistakes or clumsiness.

In a book published in 1883 Ventura Lynch noted the popularity of the milonga. "The milonga is so universal in the environs of the city that it is an obligatory piece at all the lower-class dances (bailecitos de medio pelo), and it is now heard on guitars, on paper-combs, and from the itinerant musicians with their flutes, harps and violins. It has also been taken up by the organ-grinders, who have arranged it so as to sound like the habanera dance. It is danced too in the low life clubs around...[main] markets, and also at the dances and wakes of cart-drivers, the soldiery and compadres and compadritos.

Distinctive elements added from candombe were "quebradas", improvised, jerky, semi-athletic contortions, the more dramatic the better, ironical elements like walking around the partner with exaggerated tiny steps or humorous jumps, and cortes, a suggestive pause, or sudden break in the figures of the dance. Unlike in the "Tango" of that group, however, where these movements were danced apart, they were now danced together. José Gobello suggested that the mazurka was also altered in the districts close to the docks. This Africanized milonga-tango, as well as the habanera and mazurka, was frowned upon, and found wholly unacceptable by some sections of Argentine high society.

== History ==
=== Origins ===
The late Robert Farris Thompson (Professor of Art History at Yale University, specialist in Africa and Afro-Atlantic world, and author of Tango: The Art History of Love) wrote extensively about the African roots of tango.

Tango started black, and milonga, the dance preceding it, even more so.

Milonga is 'a purely African word meaning "argument" or "issue" in Kimbundu and "lines of dancers" in Ki-Kongo. (p9). Europeans first became aware of milonga, the term initially referring to an improvised, combative song, around 1630. At that time Portuguese officials on the coast of Angola were complaining to Lisbon that Queen Nzinga, an indigenous leader of the interior, was sending out messages - milonga - to persuade local populations to join her. The black queen was also issuing lightly veiled challenges to Portuguese authority. These taunts too were milonga. So in seventeenth century Angola the term meant "words, speech, or argument". But is also referred to inciting people, talking back to authority, and verbal rebellion.

Milonga was mainly danced by the lower classes of Buenos Aires society in the 1870s-1900. Milonga was frequently danced in establishments whose customers were of African descent and sailors. Along with milonga, dances such as habanera were associated with whorehouses and prostitution. This association was so prominent that to dance the dances in establishments or dance halls you needed a permit from the city. This was because Buenos Aires officials believed that the dances would lead to prostitution.

=== Spread to Europe ===
During the early twentieth century it was common for wealthy Argentine families to send their sons to Europe to take a Grand Tour when they were coming of age. Many of the young men went to Paris where they would interact with the Parisian high society and attend dances at dinner clubs. From there they would demonstrate the various forms of tango they knew, including milonga. Oftentimes because they did not have female partners with them when they went abroad in Paris, the men would dance together. One of them would be the leader and the other would dance the follow.

According to many accounts, many of the hosts of the young Argentine men found the new styles of tango and milonga to be very risque and intriguing. Additionally many of the Parisian women were attracted to the young rich Latin men who were teaching it. as a result the dance gained a large following in Paris and later in other major cities in Europe. Many of the more conservatives members of European upper class thought that the dances were overly sexualized but that only added to the appeal of the dance to younger people of the middle and upper classes.

In 1910 milonga and tango made its way to England. Many of the English tourists summering in France were fascinated by the dance and then brought it home with them back to England. In the same year the English dancing magazine Dancing Times included pictures of people dancing tango and milonga which only helped to further the spread of these dances. within a few years tango and milonga were being danced widely in Germany, Russia and Italy. Czar Nicholas II ordered a demonstration of the dance from two of his nephews and appeared to like the dance and find it elegant. However some European nobility such as the German Kaiser Wilhelm II thought the dance was depraved and even went as far as to ban military officers and German nobility from dancing or even being at events where the dance was being danced. However this did not stop the rapid spread of tango and milonga in Germany. Many of the German officers flouted the rules and partook in the "wicked dance" despite the orders against it.

=== Spread to the United States ===
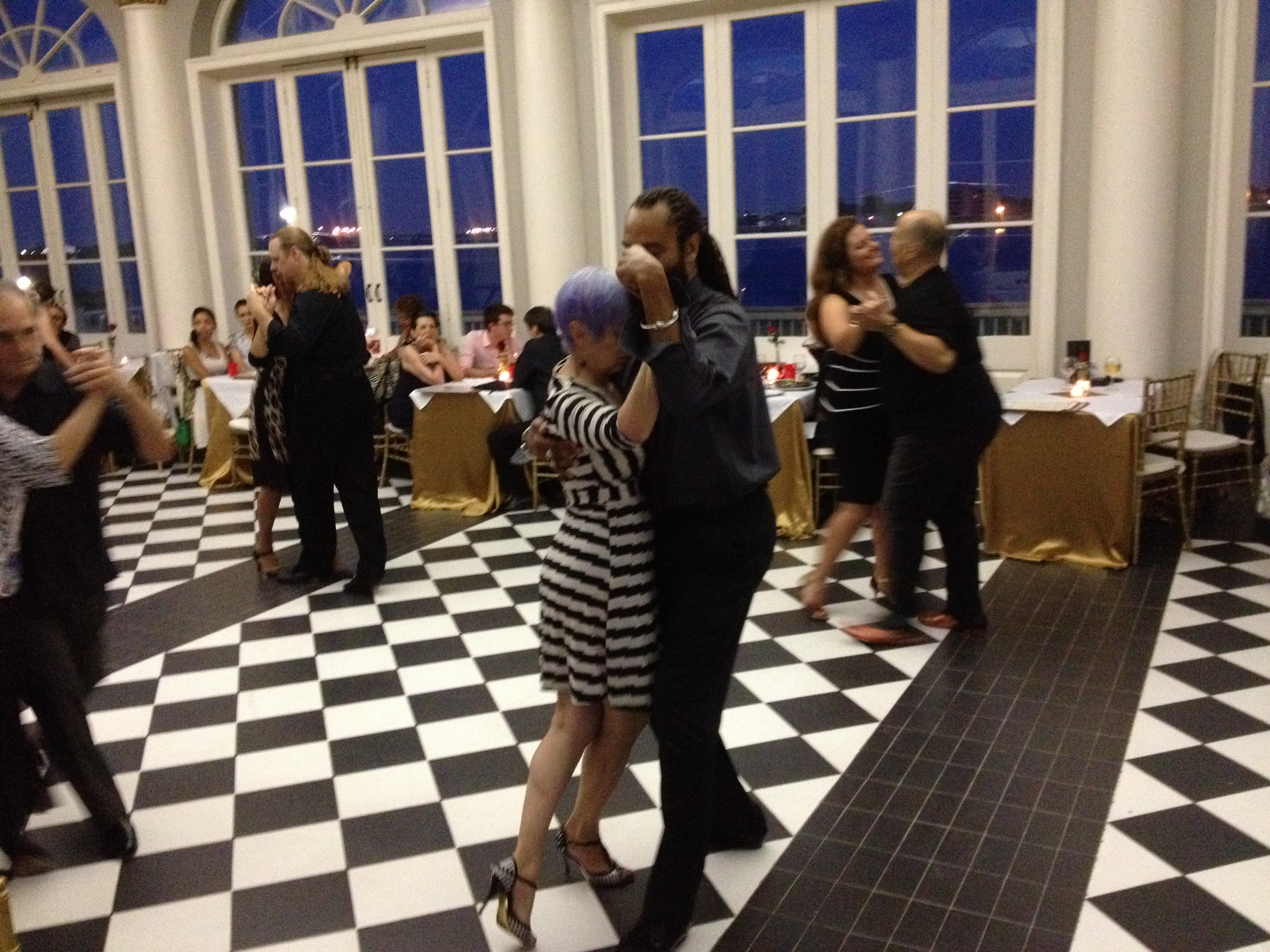
Milonga being danced in New Orleans in 2014.

In the Winter of 1913-14 tango and milonga swept through the United States. Some newspapers such as a paper in Fort Wayne, Indiana even called it a "Tango Craze" while discussing how the police were not allowing tango or "tango like dances to be danced in public." Tango became so popular that some cities such as Atlantic City and Reno started to try and capitalize on it through tourism. In Atlantic city the city officials had a trolley car converged into a "Tango Car" where the floor of the trolley was converted into a dance floor and would travel around the city. Additionally in Atlantic city beachgoers would dance tango and milonga on the beach board walk. Another places in the US that joined in on the new craze was Chicago where some people converted train cars into dance floors so that people who were traveling from Chicago to Mardi Gras could dance the whole trip so they would not have to wait until they arrived.
