= Pacha González =

Pacha González Pablo Raúl González Velasco
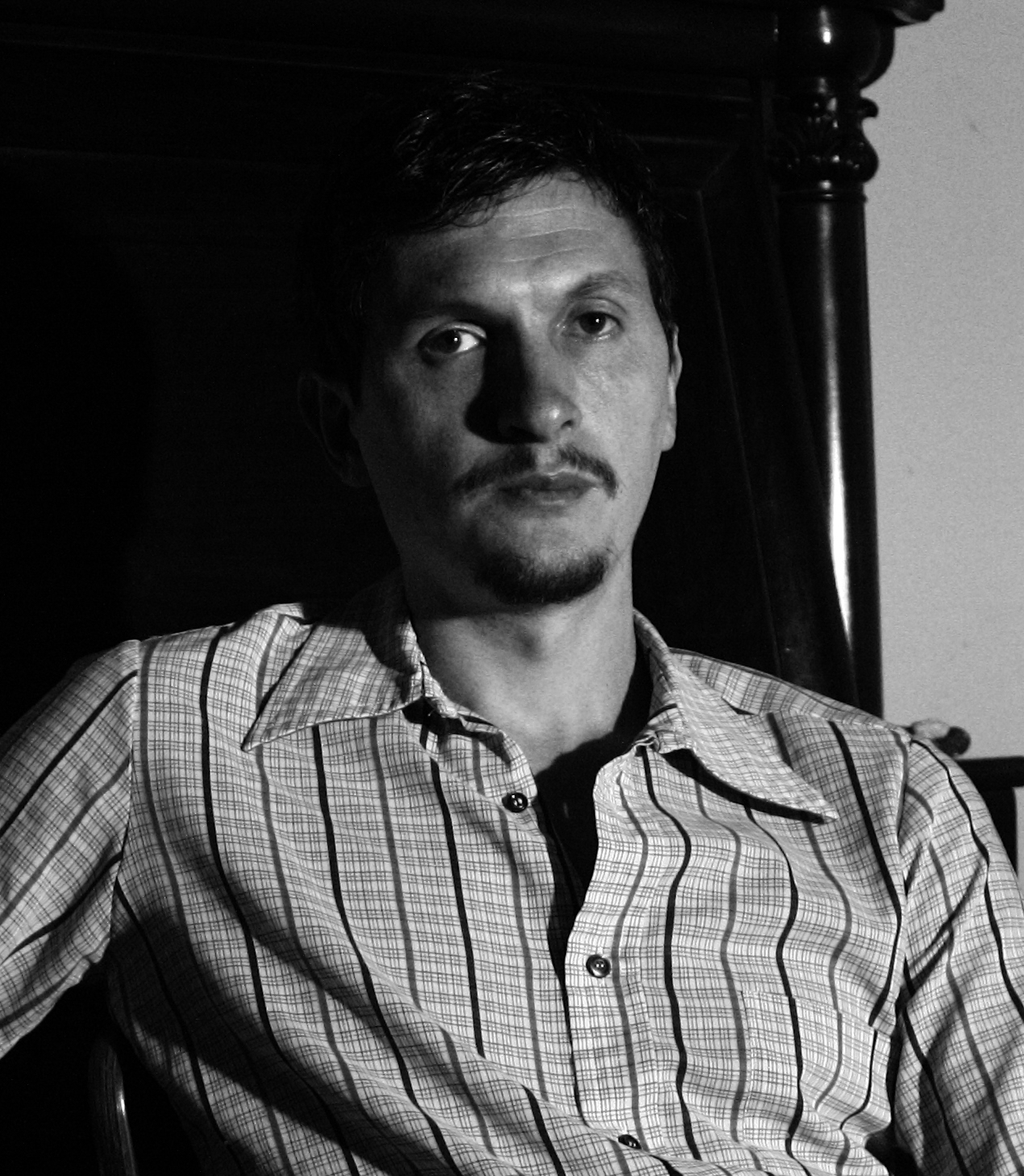

Background information
- Born: July 25, 1975 (age 50); Buenos Aires, Argentina
- Genres: Tango
- Website: www.pachagonzalez.com.ar

Pacha González (born in Buenos Aires in 1975) is an Argentine tango singer and songwriter.

== Biography ==
Pablo “Pacha” González was born in Buenos Aires in 1975. As a teenager, he started playing the piano participating in several projects with different music styles. He later developed his skill as a composer, singer and songwriter of Tango.

He is currently regarded as one of the leading figures in Neo-Tango or Nuevo Tango. Since 2012, when he recorded his first album, Alma de Rejilla, Pacha González has been part of the porteña (from Buenos Aires City) Tango scene singing his own songs.

In 2015, he released his second album El tango interminable, featuring acclaimed guest artists at Orlando Goñi Theatre (currently Galpón B) and in La Usina del Arte, as part of Buenos Aires Tango Festival. Several orchestras and bands playing the new Tango repertoire give renditions of his songs. In 2016 and 2017 he toured Europe, with his band already formed: "Los interminables" in which a bandoneon, a bass and drums are added to the piano. With this band he records his third album Interama.

== Discography ==
- 2012: Alma de rejilla
- 2015: El tango interminable
- 2018: Interama
