= José Fernandes =

José Fernandes may refer to:

- José Fernandes (fencer) (born 1934), Portuguese fencer
- José Fernandes (cyclist) (born 1995), Portuguese cyclist
