= Vals =

Vals is the word for waltz in many European languages.

Vals or VALS may also refer to:

- Peruvian waltz
- Venezuelan waltz
- Vals (dance), a dance related to Argentine tango
- VALS, "Values And Lifestyles," a psychographic segmentation tool

== Places ==
- Vals-les-Bains, France
- Vals, Ariège, France
- Vals, Switzerland
- Vals, Austria
- Vals River, South Africa

== People ==
- Eneli Vals (born 1991), Estonian footballer

== Organisations ==
- Victorian Aboriginal Legal Service (VALS), Melbourne, Australia
