= Silvio Grand =

Argentinian Tango dancer and choreographer

Silvio Grand (born 16 June 1980 in Buenos Aires, Argentina) is a dancer and choreographer of the Tango dance form.

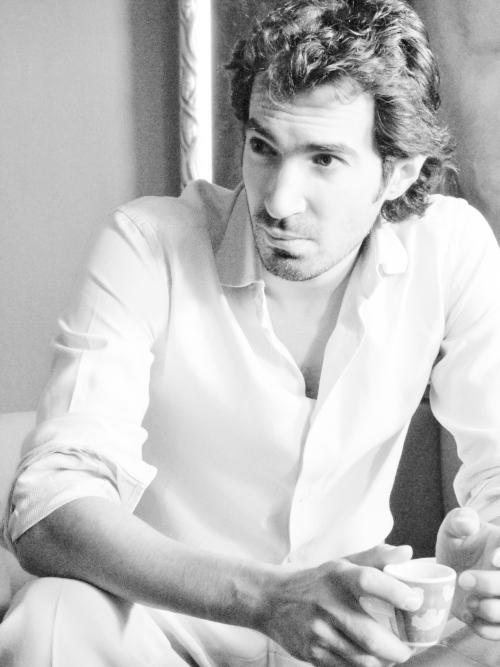
Winterthur Switzerland. Photo taken during an interview for the magazine Tango Danza.

== Career ==
During his school years, he began to learn drama with Susana Rivero, an Argentinian theater director and Leandro Rossati, a comedian. Francisco Santapa and Noemi Lertora were his first Tango teachers. Silvio was strongly influenced by dance teachers Gerardo Litvak, Sonia Rubba, Noemi Coelho, Fernando Galera, and Roberto Herrera, and the Shakespearean drama specialist director Monica Maffia.

Silvio Grand first appeared on TV at the age of 12 in the TV program, Sin Condena, hosted by Canal 9, an Argentinean TV channel. His first dance performance on stage was in 1997, at the Astral Theatre. He collaborated with Hilda Salcedo and won the first prize in the Feria Exposicion Internacional del Tango competition held in Recoleta, Buenos Aires. As the winning prize, he became member of the cast of the San Telmo's Cafe Concert Bar Sur. At the Bar Sur, he met Naoko Yoyimura, who invited him to teach in Japan.

In 2001, Silvio was a part of the TV programme, Especial Punta Y Tango, and a cast dancer of the show, Esquina Carlos Gardel (2001-2007), and the Juan Carlos Copes company (2002-2003). Between 2001 and 2011, his dance partner was Mayra Galante. The duo performed in various theatres and festivals, as starring role for the musical Dreams About Tango in The State Komedy Theatre of Saint Petersburg, and as dancers or choreographers in Melico Salazar of Costa Rica, Teatro Nacional de Republica Dominicana, Nacional of Guatemala, Fransico Saybe of Honduras, Ruben Dario of Nicaragua, Teatro municipal Viña del Mar, Chile, Teleton of Santiago, Teatro Diana and Teatro Degollado of Guadalajara, Santa Ursula of Lima, Metropolitan of Mexico Distrito Federal, Peruano Japones of Lima, Capella Concert Hall of Saint Petersburg, Teatro Nacional of Puebla, Teatro Nacional Manuel Doblado of Leon, Teatro de la Paz of San Luis Potosí, Teatro Liceo of Buenos Aires, Estadio Luna Park in Buenos Aires, Teatro de las Americas of Cordoba in Argentina, among others.

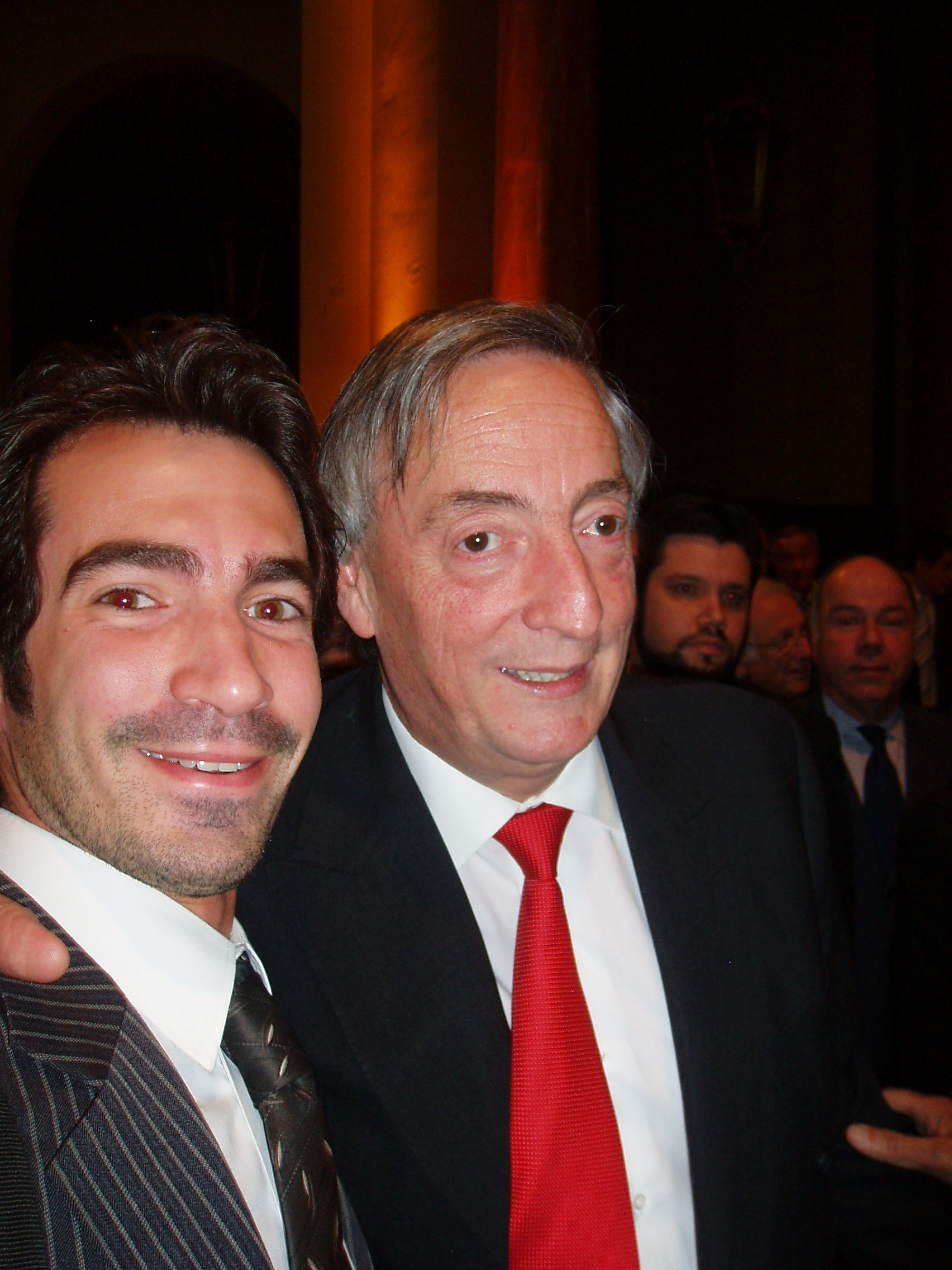
In this photo from left to right, the Argentinean dancer Silvio Grand and the now Argentinean deceased prime minister Nestor Kirchner. The photo was taken in the building of Bolsa de Comercio de Buenos Aires

== Awards and recognition ==
- Feria Exposicion Internacional del Tango (1997)

He was the Director of the dance committee that represented Argentina at the "200 Years of Independence" festival held in Teatro Degollado, along with the Jalisco Philharmonic Orchestra and Nestor Marconi in 2010. In 2012, he was the dancer and choreographer of the Erwin Schrott's Rojo Tango Musical. Silvio was a choreographer and had a starring role in The State Kremlin Palace Theatre of Moscow and Oktiabrsky Concert Hall of Saint Petersburg from 2015 to 2017.

He was a member of the Conseil International de la Danse, UNESCO, until 2018.

== Filmography and Discography ==
- Tango Un Giro Extraño (2004)
- En Escena Diez Años Juntos (2008)
- Dreans About Tango (2007-2010)
- Tango Underpants (2014)

== Personal life ==
Born in Buenos Aires, Silvio Grand grew up in the neighborhood of Parque Chacabuco. He is the godson of Carlos Marchi, an Argentinian actor. He studied in the Niñas de Ayohuma elementary school. He graduated from the Universidad Argentina John F. Kennedy in Commercial Communication.

He became a naturalized Italian citizen at the age of 18.
