= José Gobello =

Argentinian writer and politician (1919–2013)

- Born: September 26, 1919; Martínez, Buenos Aires, Argentina
- Died: October 28, 2013 (aged 94); Ramos Mejía, Buenos Aires Province, Argentina
- Other names: Belgo
- Occupations: Poet, essayist, writer
- Known for: Studies on lunfardo and tango
- Notable work: Lunfardía; Historias con ladrones; Diccionario lunfardo
- Office: Member of the Chamber of Deputies of Argentina

José Gobello (26 September 1919 – 28 October 2013) was an Argentine writer, poet, and essayist, especially known for his work on lunfardo. He was the founder, member, and president of the Academia Porteña del Lunfardo (Buenos Aires Lunfardo Academy).

== Life ==
Born into a poor family of Italian immigrants, he completed his secondary education as an adult. He supported Peronism and was elected national deputy in 1951, representing the labor branch.

When the 1955 military coup that overthrew the government of Juan Domingo Perón took place, he was imprisoned and held for two years. While in prison, he wrote his second book, Historias con ladrones, and the poem "El presidente duerme."

From then on, he dedicated himself to journalism (working for the magazine Aquí está) and to the study of tango and lunfardo, promoting and successfully founding the Academia Porteña del Lunfardo together with León Benarós and Luis Soler Cañas in 1962.

== Works ==
- Lunfardía, 1953
- Historias con ladrones, 1956
- Breve diccionario lunfardo, 1960, in collaboration with Luciano Payet
- Primera antología lunfarda, 1961, in collaboration with Luis Soler Cañas
- Las letras del tango, de Villoldo a Borges, 1966, in collaboration with Eduardo Stilman
- Nueva antología lunfarda, 1972
- Palabras perdidas, 1973
- El lenguaje de mi pueblo, 1974
- Diccionario lunfardo, 1975
- Conversando tangos, 1976
- Etimologías, 1978
- Tangos, letras y letristas, 1979, in collaboration with Jorge Bossio
- Nuevo diccionario lunfardo, 1990
- Tangos, letras y letristas, II, 1992
- Tangos, letras y letristas, III, 1993
- Tangos, letras y letristas, IV, 1994
- Tangos, letras y letristas, V, 1995
- Tangos, letras y letristas, VI (diccionario de tangos), 1996
- Aproximación al lunfardo, 1996
- Vocabulario ideológico del lunfardo, 1998, in collaboration with Irene Amuchástegui
- Breve historia crítica del tango, 1999
- Tangueces y Lunfardismos del rock argentino, 2001, in collaboration with Marcelo Oliveri
- Mujeres y hombres que hicieron el tango, 2002
- Los ángeles afeitados y otros poemas, 2002
- Ascasubi lexicógrafo, 2003
- Diccionario gauchesco, 2003
- Paratangos, 2004
- Novísimo diccionario lunfardo, 2004, in collaboration with Marcelo Oliveri
- Curso básico de lunfardo, 2004, in collaboration with Marcelo Héctor Oliveri
- Costumbrismo lunfardo, 2004
- Blanqueo etimológico del lunfardo, 2005
- Letras de tango. Selección (1897–1981), 2007
- Diccionario del habla de Buenos Aires, 2006, in collaboration with Marcelo Héctor Oliveri
- ¿Cómo era Gardel?, 2009, in collaboration with Marcelo Héctor Oliveri
- Poesía lunfarda, del burdel al Parnaso. Antología, 2010
- Historia de la Academia Porteña del Lunfardo, 2011, in collaboration with Otilia Da Veiga
