= Alberto Podestá =

Argentine tango singer

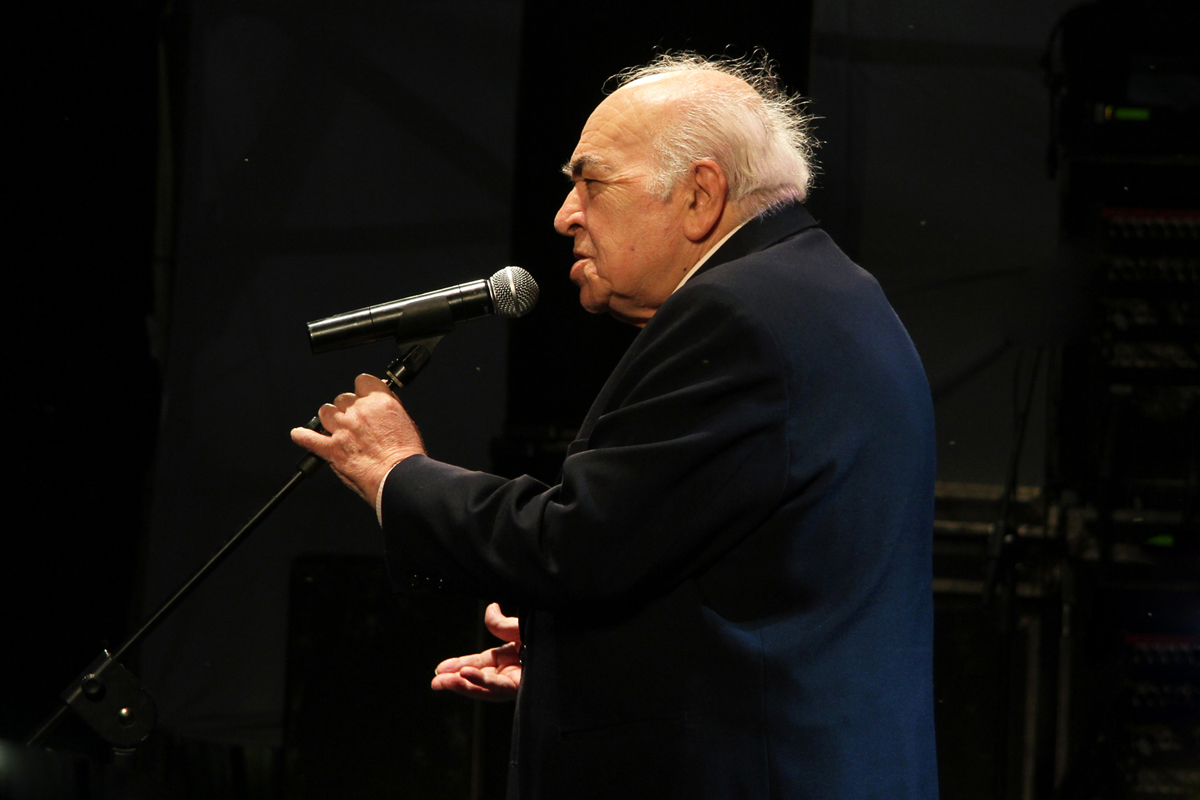
- Alberto Podestá

Background information
- Born: Alejandro Washington Alé; 22 September 1924; San Juan, Argentina
- Died: 9 December 2015 (aged 91) Buenos Aires, Argentina
- Genre: Tango
- Occupation: Singer
- Instrument: Voice

Alejandro Washington Alé, better known as Alberto Podestá (22 September 1924 – 9 December 2015), was an Argentine tango singer.

== Childhood and youth ==
Born in the city of San Juan, his father died when he was very young, which led to financial difficulties for him, his mother, and his five siblings. With the help of their grandmother, he had to work from an early age, as did his older brother.

He only studied up to sixth grade of primary school and took part in a school radio program hosted by one of his teachers. There, Alberto learned some songs by the popular Carlos Gardel and performed them in a children's show titled Rayito de Sol, where each student had to sing a popular song of the time. For that performance, he was nicknamed "Gardelito." In his youth, he also sold chocolates at a cinema owned by a family friend to earn money and help support his family.

After performing on LV5 Radio Los Andes, the comedic duo Buono-Striano arrived in the province during a tour. Upon hearing him sing, they invited him to travel to Buenos Aires to connect him professionally with the leading figures of the national scene.

In 1939, supported by Hugo del Carril, he moved to the city of Buenos Aires with one of his brothers. At the "Paradise" café, a dance venue with two sections, he met musician Roberto Caló, with whom he did several auditions (nowadays called castings), showcasing his singing talent by performing tangos such as La Mariposa, Cosas olvidadas, Martirio, and La que murió en París. After the departure of vocalist Mario Pomar, Miguel Caló brought him into his orchestra on the recommendation of his brother, Roberto. There, he performed alongside Osmar Maderna, Domingo Federico, Armando Pontier, Raúl Kaplún, and Enrique Mario Francini.

== Beginnings and rise to fame ==
With Caló’s orchestra, he first worked at the Singapur cabaret, on Montevideo Street, which was later replaced by a theater and a tango academy. There, he met Homero Expósito, who, along with Domingo Federico, was the author of the first tango Podestá recorded: Yo soy el tango. He also recorded two waltzes: Pedacito de cielo and Bajo un cielo de estrellas, composed by Enrique Mario Francini and Héctor Luciano Stamponi, with lyrics by Homero Aldo Expósito and José María Contursi.

Thanks to a proposal from Carlos di Sarli’s manager, he went to the musician's house to sing, and di Sarli hired him and gave him the stage name by which he is known, Alberto Podestá, replacing the one he had used until then: Juan Carlos Morel. Di Sarli paid him $350 for each performance in cabarets, $250 for radio appearances, and $35 for dances, unlike Miguel Caló, who had only offered him $250 per month. Despite the significant amounts, Podestá hardly sang during the performances and was overshadowed by his colleague Roberto Rufino, which led him to explain the situation to Carlos di Sarli.

With Pedro Laurenz, who was later hired by Odeón, he recorded the tango Nunca tuvo novio under the Víctor label. Together with Laurenz, he returned to Miguel Caló’s orchestra to complete the duo of singers alongside Raúl Berón. On two occasions, he came close to singing with Aníbal Troilo, but the first time he had to go on a prior tour to Uruguay with Di Sarli, and upon returning, Edmundo Rivero and Floreal Ruiz were already rehearsing with the orchestra. Later, when Podestá was performing in Chile, Raúl Berón left Troilo's orchestra, and although Troilo wanted Alberto Podestá to join his group, business urgencies forced Aníbal to immediately hire Carlos Olmedo and Pablo Lozano.

In 1945, an orchestra was formed, led by Enrique Mario Francini and Armando Pontier, in which Alberto Podestá was the singer. He was soon joined by the renowned Julio Sosa, who was a close friend of his. They performed at the Sans Souci, alternating with Osvaldo Pugliese, and at the Tibidabo cabaret, covering for the absence of Aníbal Troilo, who was temporarily not performing. Throughout his career, Podestá performed at various dance clubs such as the "Príncipe Georges," which gathered between 500 and 2,000 people and held 350 dances per week. He recorded in Colombia with Cristóbal Ramos, Ramón Ozán, and Joaquín Mauricio Mora; in Venezuela with "Los caballeros del tango"; in Uruguay with César Zagnoli; in Chile with Lucho Ibarra; and in Argentina with Juan José Paz, Leopoldo Federico, Alberto Di Paulo, Luis Stazo, Jorge Dragone, Tití Rossi, and Roberto Grela.

From the Teatro Casino, a program called Ronda de ases was broadcast on Radio El Mundo, sponsored by "Cocinero" oil. The orchestras that took turns were Osvaldo Fresedo, Aníbal Troilo, Carlos di Sarli, and Ricardo Tanturi, each performing one tango. Then Alberto Soifer's ensemble played, with Roberto Quiroga as the singer. Based on the audience's applause, it was decided which orchestra was the most liked: Alberto Podestá won one of the auditions with the tango Al compás del corazón.

In 1951, he debuted as a soloist on Radio Splendid and performed at venues such as the Maipú Pigall cabaret and cafés in the city of Buenos Aires. He was named an Honorary Academic by the Academia Nacional del Tango of Argentina. Between 1967 and 1970, he lived in Chile, where he continued his career. On his tours across America, he visited Colombia, Chile, Peru, Venezuela, Ecuador, Mexico, the Dominican Republic, and the United States, performing in New York, Chicago, Los Angeles, Boston, and Philadelphia. In his recordings, he was accompanied by Alberto Di Paulo, Leopoldo Federico, Luis Stazo, and Jorge Dragone. He recorded approximately 500 tracks, with standout performances of tangos such as Alma de bohemio, Nada, Percal, Al compás del corazón, Nido gaucho, La capilla blanca, El milagro, Margo, Qué falta que me hacés, Qué me van a hablar de amor, and El bazar de los juguetes. He performed at "Caño 14" and Edmundo Rivero’s "El Viejo Almacén," accompanied by the Ernesto Baffa Quartet with Ubaldo De Lio on guitar, Cacho Queirolo on piano, and Sergio Paolo on electric bass. Additionally, he stood out in theater alongside dancer Juan Carlos Copes and his ballet.

== Last years ==
In his later years, despite never having stopped his career, he continued to perform in occasional recitals. At the same time, he performed in the San Telmo export circuit, at venues such as "La esquina de tango" and "La cumparsita." In the mid-2000s, he participated in "La Selección del Tango," which featured musicians like Leopoldo Federico, Rodolfo Mederos, Ernesto Baffa, and Nicolás Ledesma.

In 2007, he was declared an Illustrious Citizen of Buenos Aires in the Golden Hall of the Buenos Aires Legislature.

In 2008, he was invited by Miguel Kohan to star in the film project Café de los maestros, with which he performed at the Teatro Colón, Teatro Argentino, and Luna Park. At the same time, under the direction of Eduardo Calcagno, he filmed a movie about his life, featuring Federico Luppi and Valeria Bertuccelli, titled El cantor del tango.

He died in Buenos Aires on December 9, 2015.
