= Orquesta Francini-Pontier =

Orquesta Francini-Pontier was an Orquesta típica formed in 1945 in Argentina by the violinist Enrique Mario Francini and the bandoneonist Armando Pontier. The orchestra played together until 1955 and was one of the leading tango orchestras of its day.

The two musicians started their musical career together in the tango orchestra led by Juan Ehlert which later moved to Buenos Aires in 1937 to play on Radio Prieto.

In 1939, the two joined the orchestra that had recently been put together by Miguel Caló and included Osmar Maderna (piano) and Domingo Federico (bandoneon).

The turning point in their careers came in 1945 when they formed their own orchestra which made its debut on 1 September in Tango Bar in Buenos Aires with Juan José Paz on piano; in the bandoneon section, Pontier, Ángel Domínguez, Nicolás Paracino and Juan Salomone; on violins, Francini, Pedro Sarmiento, Aquiles Aguilar and Mario Lalli; Rafael del Bagno on double bass and the singers Raúl Berón and Alberto Podestá.

They played on Radio El Mundo and released their first recording on RCA Records in 1946 with Sirva otra copa, written by Arturo Gallucci and José Rótulo, and Margo with music by Pontier and lyrics by Homero Expósito, both featuring the singer Alberto Podestá.

Appearances at the Piccadilly, the Ebro Bar and the Tibidabo cabaret followed and in 1947 the arranger Argentino Galván joined them. Their success continued until, by mutual consent, they split up in 1955.

The recorded output of the orchestra totalled over 100 numbers including Remolino with Raúl Berón; Pichuco an instrumental; Alma de bohemio, with Alberto Podestá; Nunca tuvo novio with the singer Roberto Rufino; Claveles blancos with Rufino; El ciruja, the first recording of the singer Julio Sosa in Argentina; A los amigos, an instrumental; Princesa del fango, with Sosa; A la guardia vieja, an instrumental; Olvidao, also with Sosa; Por una muñeca, with the singer Roberto Florio; Tema otoñal, written by Francini, and Chiqué, both instrumentals. Other singers that appeared with the orchestra included, Héctor Montes, Pablo Moreno, Mario Lagos and Luis Correa.
