= Julio Ahumada =

Argentine musician (1916–1984)

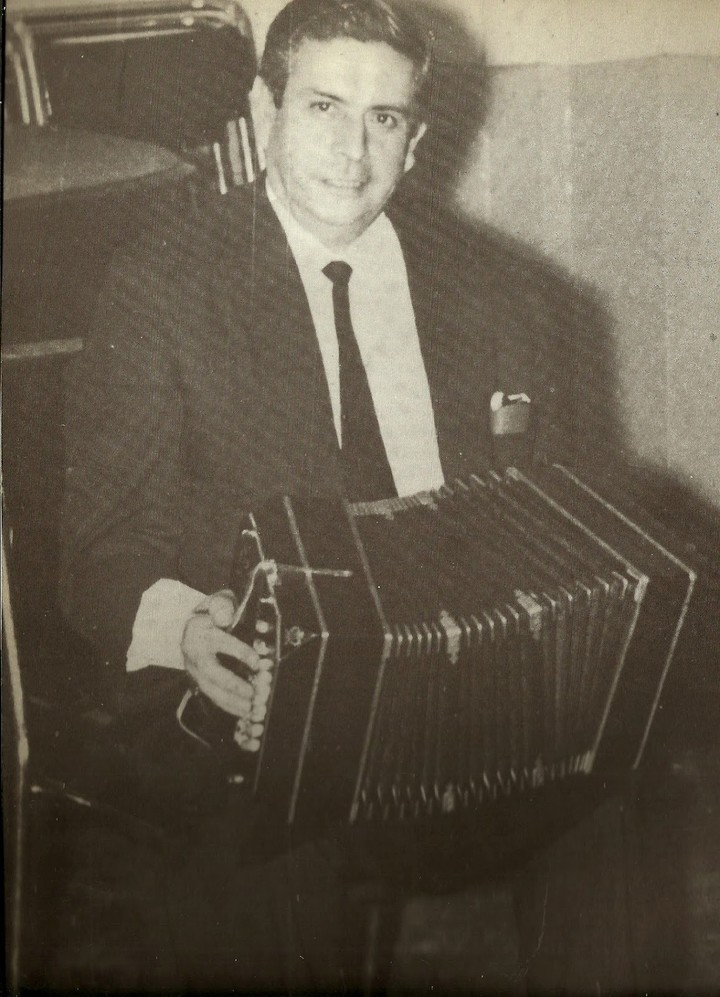

Background information
- Born: Julio Ahumada; May 12, 1916; Rosario, Argentina
- Died: March 4, 1984 (aged 67)
- Genres: Tango
- Occupations: Bandoneonist, composer, orchestra conductor
- Instrument: Bandoneon
- Years active: 1930s–1983

Julio Ahumada (12 May 1916 – 4 March 1984) was an Argentine bandoneonist, composer, and orchestra conductor dedicated to the tango genre.

== Professional career ==
He began his professional career as a bandoneon player in the orchestra of his teacher Abel Bedrune, where Antonio Ríos also played. At the age of 20, he moved to Buenos Aires, to the legendary Pensión La Alegría, a boarding house located at 321 Salta Street where many musicians connected to tango lived, including prominent figures such as Emilio Barbato, Homero Expósito, Enrique Francini, Cristóbal Herreros, Enrique Munné, Armando Pontier, Antonio Ríos, Ernesto Rossi, Héctor Stamponi, Alberto Suárez Villanueva, and Argentino Galván.

His encounter with Argentino Galván was especially important for Ahumada, as over time he was invited to be the lead bandoneonist in all of Galván's ensembles. In Buenos Aires, Ahumada joined the orchestra of Roberto Zerrillo and later performed successively with those of Alberto Soifer, Nicolás Vaccaro, and Lucio Demare. He also played in Miguel Caló’s orchestra alongside young bandoneonists, where he arranged several pieces.

At the end of 1943, he was invited by Emilio Balcarce to join, as lead bandoneonist, the orchestra formed to accompany singer Alberto Castillo. He took part in various recordings, among which his bandoneon solo in the tango La que murió en París stands out.

In the mid-1940s, he became a member of the house orchestra of Radio El Mundo, while simultaneously performing with the orchestras of Argentino Galván, Héctor Artola, José Basso, Joaquín Do Reyes, and Enrique Francini. Alongside his colleague from Radio El Mundo, Miguel Bonano, he formed the orquesta típica Ahumada-Bonano, which had a brief but well-received run.

In 1957, when Argentino Galván created the septet Los Astros del Tango to perform under his direction and arrangements, Ahumada joined and entered one of the most brilliant prolific of his career, as evidenced by the 38 recordings he participated in.

In 1960, he took part in another of Galván’s projects, when, along with 42 other notable musicians, he participated in the recording—under Galván’s direction—of 34 tracks for the Music Hall label. This project formed the History of the Orquesta Típica, a journey through various ensembles and styles that required the musicians to imitate each of the orchestras.

That same year, Ahumada took part in a new orchestra formed by Galván, with which they performed at the Ópera movie theater and made recordings, among which his bandoneon solo in Nunca tuvo novio stands out.

In 1964, after Galván had died, he joined contrabassist Eugenio Pro and guitarists Marsilio Robles and Juan Mehaudy to form the group Cuatro Para el Tango, which recorded several tracks for the Spacial label.

In 1966, together with contrabassist Hamlet Greco, he gave a series of concerts at the Teatro Apolo, featuring his own arrangements and musical direction. The same performers, along with pianist Carlos Parodi and violinist Aquiles Aguilar, accompanied singer Carlos Olmedo in a series of recordings released by the Tini label.

He also collaborated with violinists Enrique Cantore and Alfonso Bernava, pianist Enrique Munné, and contrabassist Mario Monteleone when they were invited by Gabriel Clausi to record an album for his own label, Chopin.

He was the sole bandoneonist in the 40-piece symphonic orchestra that the prestigious conductor and composer Juan José Castro selected to premiere The Threepenny Opera at the Teatro Presidente Alvear. He was also part of the Pen Tangoorganized by Dino Saluzzi for an extended season. Ahumada worked in the resident orchestra of El Viejo Almacén, owned by Edmundo Rivero, and when Carlos Figari’s sextet performed at the venue, he served as the lead bandoneonist and arranger.

In February 1980, he joined Saluzzi, Marconi, and Antonio Príncipe in the bandoneon section for the debut of the Orquesta del Tango de la Ciudad de Buenos Aires, conducted by Carlos García. He contributed to the orchestra’s first repertoire with the arrangement of his tango Pa’ mamá.

They recorded 12 tracks, which arrived in Argentina after Ahumada had already died. Among them, his performance in the tango Medianoche by Alberto Tavarozzi is especially remembered.

== As a composer ==
Among his compositions are Amor y soledad, De mis sueños, and Dulce y romántica, co-written with Carlos Figari; El gurí, recorded by Francini; Hasta el último tren, with lyrics by Julio Camilloni, which won first prize in 1969 in a contest organized by the company Odol—an event that consistently filled the Luna Park stadium with audiences. The second prize in that contest went to Balada para un loco by Astor Piazzolla and Horacio Ferrer. Other works include A Anselmo Aieta and Tangueando en el contrabajo, composed in collaboration with Rafael Del Bagno, and Pa' mamá, recorded by Leopoldo Federico, the Ahumada-Bonano orchestra, and the Orquesta del Tango de Buenos Aires.
