= Enrique Mario Francini =

Argentine musician (1916–1978)

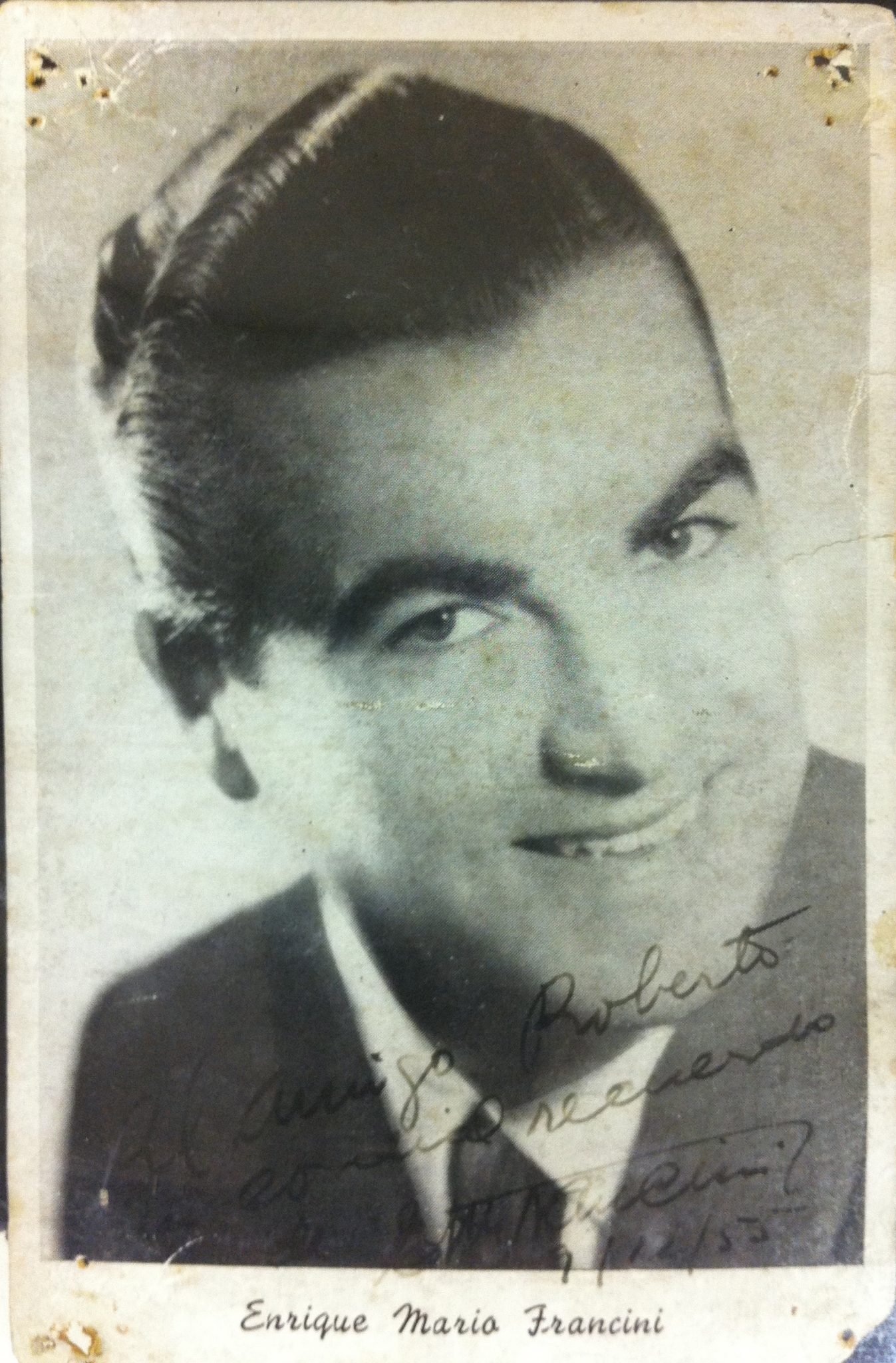
- Enrique Mario Francini

Background information
- Born: February 14, 1916; San Fernando, Buenos Aires, Argentina
- Origin: Argentina
- Died: August 27, 1978 (aged 62) Buenos Aires, Argentina
- Genres: Tango
- Occupations: Violinist, orchestra conductor, composer
- Instrument: Violin

Enrique Mario Francini (14 January 1916 in San Fernando – 27 August 1978 in Buenos Aires) was an Argentine tango orchestra director, composer and violinist who played in various tango ensembles including the Orquesta Francini-Pontier and Ástor Piazzolla's Octeto Buenos Aires.

== Early years ==
Born in the city of San Fernando in the province of Buenos Aires, Argentina and 20 km north the city of Buenos Aires, Francini spent his childhood and adolescence in the city of Campana on the Paraná River. Here he studied the violin with the German violinist Juan Ehlert and in 1933, when Carlos Gardel gave a concert in Campana, Francini and his friend Héctor Stamponi, the same age as him, presented Gardel with a tango which the friends, had composed together.

== Musical career ==
Francini started his musical career when he joined the orchestra of Ehlert, which included Héctor Stamponi and Armando Pontier, and performed on a well-known afternoon programme on Radio Prieto. He would later form a trio with Stamponi and Pontier to play on Radio Argentina.

Later he joined the orchestra of Miguel Caló which included musicians such as Osmar Maderna, Domingo Federico, Carlos Lazzari and Armando Pontier. In 1945 Francini and Pontier formed the Orquesta Francini-Pontier which played together successfully for the next ten years and made 120 records, 34 of which were instrumentals, starting with the recording of the tango Margot made on 29 January 1946. Inspired by Aníbal Troilo, the orchestra evolved instrumentally with tangos such as Arrabal, La beba, Lo que vendrá, Pa'que se acuerden de mí, Para lucirse, Pichuco, Tigre viejo and A Zárate. During these ten years the singers that accompanied the orchestra alternated between Alberto Podestá, Raúl Berón, Roberto Rufino, Julio Sosa, Pablo Moreno, Roberto Florio, Héctor Montes and Luis Correa.

After this he set up a duo with Hector Stamponi, whilst at the same time establishing his own orchestra with the pianist Juan Jose Paz, the bandoneonist Julio Ahumada and the singer Alberto Podestá. Lasting less than one year, the orchestra made various recordings starting with La trilla by Eduardo Arolas, and Petit Salón with music by Vicente Demarco and lyrics by Silvio Marinucci, on 3 November 1955 for the recording company RCA Records. Outstanding within Francini’s repertoire were Tema otoñal and his solos in Inspiración and Sensiblero.

In 1954 he took part in a homage to Juan Carlos Cobián in a quintet comprising the tango musicians Aníbal Troilo on bandoneon, Roberto Grela on guitar, Kicho Díaz on double bass and Horacio Salgán on piano.

The following year he joined Astor Piazzolla’s Octeto Buenos Aires with the bandoneons of Piazzolla and Roberto Pansera (later replaced by Leopoldo Federico), the violin of Hugo Baralis, the cello of José Bragato, the double bass of Aldo Nicolini (later replaced by Juan Vasallo), the electric guitar of Horacio Malvicino and the piano of Atilio Stampone. The Octeto would pioneer nuevo tango and put Piazzolla on a collision course with the tango establishment.

Next he formed the Quinteto Real with Horacio Salgán, Pedro Laurenz and Ubaldo de Lío and also set up an orchestra, Los Astros del Tango, with Elvino Vardaro to record tango compositions of the top tango composers of the time, with arrangements by Argentino Galván. Francini also participated in Los Violines de Oro del Tango, a tango ensemble, which like the previous one, consisted mainly of strings.

In 1963 he joined the pianist Orlando Trípodi, together with Armando Pontier, Domingo Federico, Alberto Podestá and Raúl Berón in La Orquesta de las Estrellas, directed by Miguel Caló and later in 1970 he formed a sextet, with the bandoneonist Néstor Marconi in charge of arrangements, which appeared at Caño 14 in Buenos Aires, on television and recorded an album.

The Francini-Pontier orchestra was reformed in 1973 and toured Japan with the singer Alba Solís and musicians including Omar Murtgh, Néstor Marconi and Omar Valente. In 1977 the orchestra went on another tour there, this time staging a show with more than 20 musicians and tango dancers. On his return, Francini organised a symphony orchestra which staged the show Tangos por el mundo in the Teatro Alvear in Avenida Corrientes.

He was musician who, in parallel with his activities in the world of tango, played as a first violin in the Buenos Aires Philharmonic until his death. He was also active in the Argentine Society of Authors and Music Composers (SADAIC).

He died of a heart attack on 27 August 1978 in the middle of a performance of Nostagias in Caño 14.

== Tango compositions ==
Francini composed the music for the following tangos:

- Mañana iré temprano
- Bajo un cielo de estrellas
- La vi llegar (lyrics by Julian Centeya, 1944).
- Junto a tu corazón
- Inquietud
- Ese muchacho Troilo
- Tema otoñal

== Discography ==
Francini made recordings with various orchestras and for a number of different record labels including:

- Mañana iré temprano and Sans Souci, Miguel Caló Orchestra, Odeón.
- Delirio, Pecado and A los amigos, Francini-Pontier Orchestra, Víctor.
- Mi refugio, Tema otoñal and Marrón y azul, Octeto Buenos Aires, Allegro and Disc-Jockey.
- Milonguita, Copacabana and Tiernamente, Los Astros del Tango, Music-Hall.
- Organito de la tarde, El arranque and Ya no cantas chingolo, Quinteto Real, Columbia,

== Filmography ==
- La sombra de Safo (1957)
- Cuidado con las imitaciones
- La diosa impura (1963)
