= Carlos Lazzari =

Argentine musician (1925–2009)

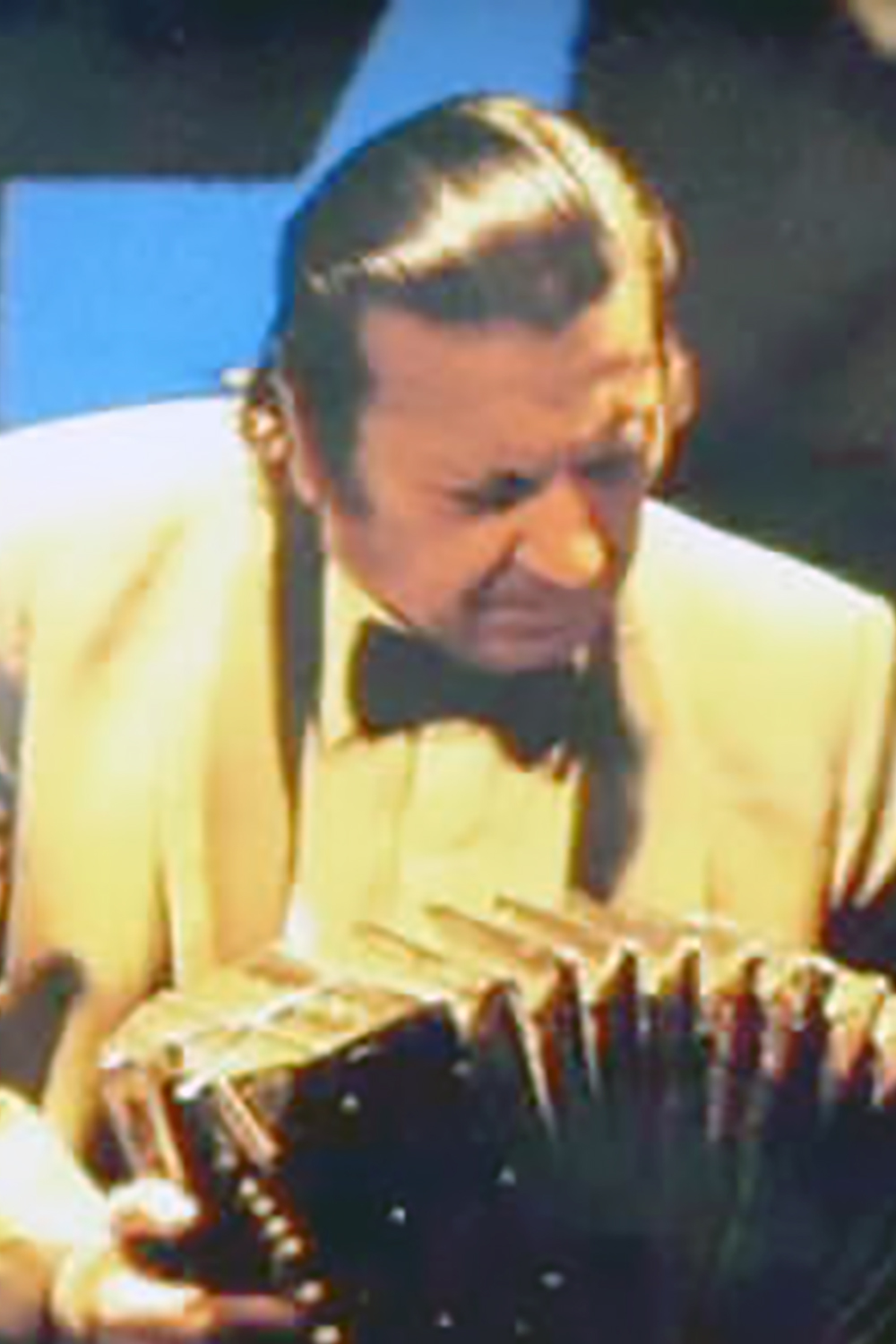
- Born: December 9, 1925; Buenos Aires, Argentina
- Died: June 9, 2009 (aged 83); Buenos Aires, Argentina
- Occupations: Musical arranger, bandoneonist, composer, orchestra conductor

Carlos Ángel Lazzari (Buenos Aires, Argentina, December 9, 1925 – ibidem, June 7, 2009), also known by his pseudonym Palmer, was a bandoneonist, composer, arranger, and orchestra conductor dedicated to the tango genre. He spent 26 years in the bandoneon section of Juan D'Arienzo's orchestra.

== Professional career ==
Carlos Lazzari was the son of Luis Juan Lazzari, a shopkeeper from the Villa Pueyrredón neighborhood, and María Josefa Erice. The family home, located at 3157 Franco Street, had a spacious patio where he played his first tango chords.

He learned the basics of music on a bandoneón his father bought for him, studying under Alejandro Junnissi—the composer of El recodo and El ingeniero—and made his first appearances in spontaneously formed orchestras that never developed much further. At the age of 14, he joined Pedro Maffia’s orchestra as a bandoneonist, where he played alongside fellow bandoneonist Cayetano Cámara, pianist Lalo Scalise, violinist Emilio Puglisi, and double bassist Francisco de Lorenzo.

He didn’t remain there long, as the director dissolved the ensemble in 1939. He then went on to play with Miguel Caló’s renowned Orquesta de las Estrellas (Orchestra of the Stars), where he performed alongside bandoneonists of the caliber of Domingo Federico, Armando Pontier, Juan Cambareri, Eduardo Rovira, and Felipe Ricciardi, with whom he refined his tango skills. The pianist and arranger was the innovative Osmar Maderna, and when the orchestra disbanded, Lazzari followed Maderna—although only for a short time.

He later joined Francisco Canaro’s orchestra, playing alongside the Uruguayan bandoneonist Minotto Di Cicco, where he learned the bandoneón cadenero technique—those signature flowing skills that helped define the sound of the great orchestras of the time. He then had brief stints with the ensembles of Juan Canaro and Domingo Federico.

In 1950, Héctor Varela and Alberto San Miguel, the first and second bandoneonists of Juan D’Arienzo’s orchestra, left the group. Francisco Canaro himself recommended Lazzari—then 25 years old—as a replacement. Lazzari, in turn, recommended Enrique Alessio, who became the first bandoneonist. The bandoneon section was completed by Aldo Junnissi, Felipe Ricciardi, and Eladio Blanco, while Fulvio Salamanca set the rhythm from the piano.

When Alessio and Salamanca left the ensemble, the role of cadenero fell to Lazzari, along with that of arranger. The ovations from an audience that faithfully followed D'Arienzo over the years—filling clubs, cabarets, and any venue where he performed (they sometimes played up to thirty dances a month, including matinées and evening shows in addition to cabaret performances)—testify to the success of Lazzari’s work. He was even the one who discovered the singer Jorge Valdez and brought him into the orchestra.

When D'Arienzo retired from performing, his musicians formed Los solistas de D'Arienzo, directed by Lazzari, who also organized and led La Juan D'Arienzo. With these groups, they traveled frequently to Japan, where they were idolized. The ensemble included pianist Normando Lazzara, violinist Milo Dojman, double bassist Enrique Guerra, and singers Osvaldo Ramos and Alberto Echagüe, in addition to Lazzari himself.

They also formed, with the proper authorization from D'Arienzo's heir, the Orquesta Símbolo Juan D'Arienzo, and made successful trips to Japan from the 1980s through the 2000s. One of the last lineups of the quartet included, besides Lazzari and his bandoneón, double bassist Héctor Guri, violinist Daniel Margenat (later replaced by Ricardo Buonvicino), pianist Raúl Monti (later replaced by Alfredo Montoya), and singer Walter Gutiérrez.

== Notable works ==
Among his more than two hundred works, notable ones include Castigo y pasión, with Ernesto Rodríguez and Juan Polito; Calla bandoneón, with Oscar Rubens; the waltz De vuelta, with Carlos Bahr, recorded twice by Carlos Di Sarli; Don Alfredo, with Ramón Montoya; Engañadora, with Enrique Alessio; Este es el rey, with Juan Polito; Glorioso Chantecler, with Juan Polito and Ángel Gatti; Hoy te quiero mucho más, with Horacio Sanguinetti; Julie, with Enrique Alessio, notably interpreted by Osvaldo Pugliese; Mechongue, with Juan Polito and Donato Racciatti; and Nuestro último vals, with Normando Lázara.
