= Jorge Casal =

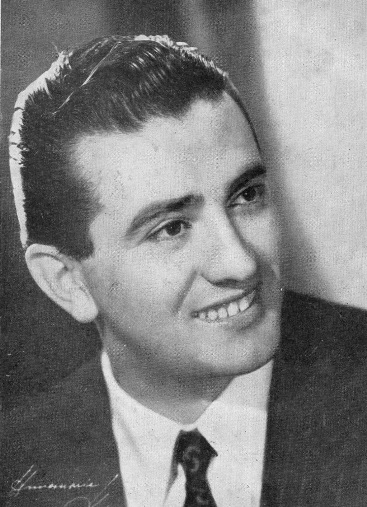
- Jorge Casal in 1954

Background information
- Born: Salvador Carmelo Pappalardo; 4 January 1924; Buenos Aires, Argentina
- Died: 25 June 1996 (aged 72) Buenos Aires, Argentina
- Genre: Tango
- Occupation: Singer
- Instruments: Vocals, guitar
- Labels: RCA Victor, TK

Jorge Casal (14 January 1924 – 25 June 1996), whose real name was Salvador Carmelo Pappalardo, was an Argentine tango singer and actor with a long artistic career.

== Professional career ==
The son of Italian parents, Jorge Casal began working in a small textile factory in Villa Piaggio (now Villa Lynch), in the San Martín district, about 20 blocks from his home.

He began his professional career in tango alongside his friend, the singer Roberto Florio.

He was hired as a singer for Florindo Sassone's orchestra, where he sang tangos such as Canción de cuna and Volver by Carlos Gardel and Alfredo Le Pera, from 18 November 1946, until 1950.

On 2 March 1950, he joined Aníbal Troilo's orchestra, leaving behind 20 memorable recordings on record, and remained there until 30 April 1955, when he made his debut as a solo singer. Alongside Troilo was also his other singer, Raúl Berón.

His first recordings in that capacity were made with Roberto Grela’s guitar ensemble.

== Films ==
- 1950: Al compás de tu mentira, with the orchestra of Domingo Federico.
- 1952: Mi noche triste, where he dubbed the actor Jorge Salcedo.
- 1954: El cartero, where he worked alongside the actress Haydée Larroca.
- 1955: Vida nocturna.

== TV ==
- 1956: El tango, señor de la ciudad, with Astor Piazzolla, Alba Solís, the ballet of Ángel Eleta, and Nelly Raymond.
- 1963: Grandes valores del tango.

== Theatre ==
- 1953: El patio de la morocha, a one-act play by Cátulo Castillo and Aníbal Troilo. Previously, he toured Brazil.
- 1959: Caramelos surtidos, by Enrique Santos Discépolo, again with Aníbal Troilo and performed at the Presidente Alvear Theater.

== Discography ==
- Dicen que dicen
- A mis manos
- Canción de cuna y Volver (1947).
- Por dónde andará (1947).
- Puentecito de mi río (1947).
- Cien guitarras (1947).
- Siempre te nombra (1947).
- El día que me quieras (1948).
- A la luz del candil (1948).
- Rencor (1949).
- Y volvemos a querernos (1949).
- Mi noche triste (1949).
- La última cita (1949).
- Fogón de huella (1949).
- Madre hay una sola (1949).
- No te engañes corazón (1949).
- Noches de Atenas (1950).
- Al compás de la mentira (1950)
- Uno y uno
- Tinglado

With Aníbal Troilo (TK):

- Che bandoneón 24-11-1950
- Mi vieja viola 19-02-1951
- El patio de la morocha 21-03-1951
- La violeta 30-07-1951
- Buenos Aires 20-03-1952
- Amigazo 28-03-1952
- Uno 14-05-1952
- Flor campera 05-06-1952
- Ventanita de arrabal 07-08-1952
- Barrio viejo del 80 11-09-1952
- Del suburbio 11-09-1952
- Araca corazón 23-11-1952
- La mentirosa 12-12-1952
- Vuelve la serenata 23-03-1953 (with Raúl Berón)
- Una canción 19-05-1953
- Patio mío 22-09-1953
- Milonga del mayoral 22-09-1953 (with Raúl Berón)
- Carmín 12-02-1954
- La cantina 29-04-1954
- Los cosos de al lao 06-09-1954
