= Héctor Stamponi =

Argentine musician (1916–1997)

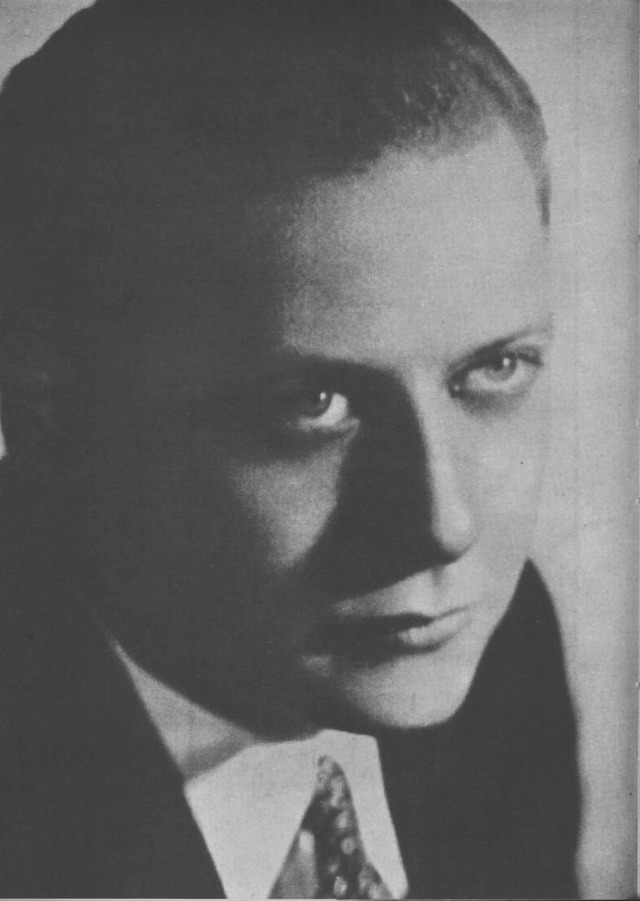
- Héctor Stamponi in Mexico, 1943.

Background information
- Born: December 24, 1916; Campana, Argentina
- Died: December 3, 1997 (aged 81) Buenos Aires, Argentina
- Genres: Tango
- Occupations: Pianist, composer, conductor
- Instrument: Piano

Héctor Luciano Stamponi (24 December 1916 – 3 December 1997) was an Argentine tango composer, pianist, and arranger. He composed, among others, the tangos El último café (1963, with lyrics by Cátulo Castillo) and Qué me van a hablar de amor (with lyrics by Homero Expósito and recorded by Julio Sosa in 1963).

== Life ==
Nicknamed Chupita, he studied piano with Esther Coltelli. He began his musical career in the orchestra of Juan Elhert (a German tango musician based in Zárate), a group that also included Enrique Mario Francini, Armando Pontier, Cristóbal Herreros, and the singer René Di Pietro. They moved to Buenos Aires, performing at the famous matinée of Juan Manuel in 1936. Shortly afterward, the artistic careers of these musicians diverged. Stamponi, Francini, and Pontier formed a trio that accompanied artists on Radio Argentina.

Later, in the 1937–1938 season, Stamponi joined the orchestra led by Federico Scorticati, who performed on Radio Sténtor.

Stamponi left Scorticati's orchestra, briefly joining Miguel Caló’s orchestra without making any recordings. He then devoted himself to orchestration.

In 1943, he was the pianist for Antonio Rodio’s orchestra. Shortly afterward, he traveled to Central America as the accompanist for singer Amanda Ledesma. He stayed in Mexico, where he composed tangos for the films Somos dos(1944) and Cruz. In 1959, he formed the group Los Violines de Oro del Tango with Enrique Mario Francini.

In Mexico (1944), he composed music for films and wrote two tangos with Ernesto Cortázar: Somos dos and Cruz. Upon returning to Buenos Aires, he began studying with maestro Alberto Ginastera (harmony) and Julián Bautista (composition) in 1946, and formed an excellent orquesta típica to fulfill a recording contract with Victor Records.

Guillermo Arbós was his first singer. He was later followed by Alberto Drames and Alfredo Arrocha. The recording cycle ended in 1949. After leaving this activity, he continued as a piano soloist, accompanist, and arranger. All the most important performers sought his collaboration.

In 1953, as had been done years earlier by Roberto Firpo and Cayetano Puglisi, Enrique Delfino and Agesilao Ferrazzano, and Carlos Vicente Geroni Flores also with Ferrazzano, he performed alongside Enrique Mario Francini, forming a piano and violin duet. In some instances, the excellent cellist José Bragato would join them.

In 1959, he formed the group Los Violines de Oro del Tango, which he co-directed with Francini. The ensemble also included Enrique Díaz on double bass and the violinists José Niesov, Adolfo Gendelman, Vicente Tagliacozzo, Simón Bajour, Luis Gutiérrez del Barrio, Hugo Baralis, and Juan Ghirlanda.

At the same time, he formed a large ensemble to support a long-playing record by Edmundo Rivero, featuring as main artists the violinist Raúl Marcelli and the bandoneon of Mario Demarco, Kicho Díaz on double bass, Mario Lalli on viola, and José Bragato on cello.

In 1960, he gathered another group of musicians to accompany the singer Raúl Lavié (from the PK record company), recording on the record grooves a instrumental tango by Mario Demarco titled Solfeando. In 1962, he teamed up with Mario Arroyo, Horacio Ferrer(from the PK record company), Jorge Seijo, and Luis Adolfo Sierra (from the PK record company) to record a tango album performed by his piano.

In September 1962, it was announced in Montevideo how the ensemble would be composed: Mario Arroyo, Horacio Ferrer, Jorge Seijo, and Dr. Luis Adolfo Sierra. They recorded an album with four songs by Adolfo Ábalos: En pleno Nueva York, Al Buenos Aires de las 3 de la mañana, Para cantor y orquesta, and Para recordar—splendid tangos performed with piano solos by Héctor Stamponi.

He composed, among other works, the tangos Cuando cuentes la historia de tu vida (music and lyrics), El trompo azul, El último café (Odol Award 1963), El vino enamorado, Inquietud, Qué me van a hablar de amor, Quedémonos aquí, Soy un circo, and Yo quería ser feliz (music and lyrics). He also composed the waltzes Flor de lino, Pedacito de cielo, and Un momento (music and lyrics).

He was the director of the resident orchestra at Caño 14 and was part of the ensemble from the establishment of the venue (1963) until its closure. For several seasons, he also formed a highly successful duo with Enrique Mario Francini at the same location. He directed the groups that accompanied Roberto Goyeneche, Alberto Marino, Nelly Vázquez, Hugo Marcel, Alba Solís, Jorge Sobral, María Graña, Rubén Juárez, and Raúl Lavié, among others. During his time at Caño 14, Hugo del Carril, at his express request, had him as the director of the group that accompanied him. Stamponi actively participated in the institutional life of SADAIC (Society of Authors and Music Composers), holding various positions from 1970 to 1977, when he served as vice president.

== Awards and honors ==
- Distinguished Citizen of the City of Buenos Aires.
- The corner of Avenida Corrientes and 25 de Mayo in Buenos Aires bears his name.
- He received the Konex Award Diploma of Merit as a tango composer in 1985 and 1995.

== Bibliography ==
- Torres, Leda (2022). Héctor Stamponi. Sus tangos en piano solo [Héctor Stamponi. His tangos on solo piano] (in Spanish). Mil Campanas. ISBN 9789874587381.
