= Roberto Florio =

- Born: 9 November 1929; Buenos Aires, Argentina
- Died: 5 October 1993 (aged 63) Buenos Aires, Argentina
- Genres: Tango
- Occupation: Singer
- Instrument: Vocals

Rodolfo Ángel Florio (9 November 1929 – 5 October 1993), also known by the pseudonym Chocho, was an Argentine singer dedicated to the tango genre. He worked with various top-tier orchestras, including those of Francini-Pontier, Carlos di Sarli, Alfredo De Angelis, José Basso, and Lorenzo Barbero.

== Professional career ==
As a boy, he began working for a weaver, and with his slightly older coworker—who would later become known as Jorge Casal—they would sometimes sing tangos while they worked. At the age of 20, he entered a singing contest at the Federal Argentino Club in the Saavedra neighborhood and won, beating out the other contestants, one of whom was Roberto Goyeneche. After the contest, he accepted an offer to perform at Café Los Andes in the Chacarita neighborhood, taking over for Alberto Marino, who was already performing there.

He didn't have much formal musical training, so he decided to study first with a group of guitarists and later with a music teacher. While performing at Café La Armonía on Avenida Corrientes at 1400, he was heard by Lorenzo Barbero, who also worked at the venue and brought him into his Orquesta de la Argentinidad, where he stayed for three years. The orchestra had 25 musicians, some of whom played regional instruments, as it performed not only tangos but also other rhythms in an effort to represent all the provinces of Argentina.

He performed alongside great figures such as Pedro Maffia and Alberto Castillo in a program sponsored by Jabón Federal called La gran audición Federal. It aired on Thursdays from 9:00 to 10:30 p.m. and on Sundays from 12:00 to 1:30 pm. It was the most successful radio show of the time in Argentina and reached the entire country through a national network of stations. By the 1950s, they were also performing on the official television channel, the newly created Canal 7.

In October 1951, Barbero's orchestra began recording for the Odeon record label, with Roberto Florio recording the waltz La virgen del perdón by Carlos Vicente Geroni Flores, with lyrics by Vicente Retta and Carlos Max Viale; Barbero's tango La serranita; the chamamé El Recluta by Mario Millán Medina; and, in a duet with Carlos Del Monte, the milonga-style tango Tomá mate, tomá mate by Francisco Canaro.

In the meantime, he also collaborated with Oscar Castagniaro's ensemble in several performances and in the recording of Madre hay una sola for the TK label.

On the recommendation of Jorge Casal, he was hired by the Francini-Pontier orchestra and was replaced by Jorge Sobral in Barbero's orchestra. With his new orchestra, he performed and recorded for RCA Victor: Los cosos de al lao in 1954, and Cuartito azul, Por una muñeca, and Por unos ojos negros in 1955. The Francini-Pontier orchestra had made its debut on September 1, 1945, at the opening of the Tango Bar on Corrientes Avenue at 1200, and the co-direction lasted ten years. On the same date in 1955, Armando Pontier debuted as the sole leader of his own orchestra.

When the orchestra leaders parted ways in 1955, Florio followed Pontier and was joined by the then-not-yet-famous singer Julio Sosa. With this orchestra, he recorded Lágrimas de sangre and Quemá esas cartas.

The following year, he joined the orchestra of Carlos di Sarli, where he remained until early 1958, a period considered the peak of his career. Among his successful songs from that time are Adiós corazón, Buenos Aires, Calla, Cantemos corazón, Cuanta angustia, Derrotado (with music by Antonio Arcieri and lyrics by José Terragno and Antonio Bernárdez), Destino de flor, Fogón de huella, Nuestra noche, Pobre buzón, Por qué regresas tú, Por un te quiero, Y todavía te quiero, Soñemos, and—in duet with Jorge Durán—Quién sino tú and Serenata mía.

He then worked with Alfredo De Angelis’s orchestra alongside singer Juan Carlos Godoy, and during 1958 he recorded six tracks for Odeon.

After leaving De Angelis, he partnered with Jorge Durán, and together they formed their own orchestra, which was led by Orlando Tripodi on piano. In 1959, they began recording a full-length album for the RCA Victor label, but when they were halfway through, the company decided not to release it. As a result, only a few recordings became known over time and eventually reached many interested listeners. These include Dame mi libertad, Yo no quise hacerte mal, Un amor imposible, Estrella, and, in duet with Jorge Durán, Regresa a mí, Amor de resero, and Ojos de canela.

Through the mediation of Eber Lobato, his wife's brother, he had the opportunity to sing in the United States and later returned to Argentina at the request of tango dancer Juan Carlos Copes. In 1962, he spent a brief period with José Basso’s orchestra, accompanying singers Jorge Durán and Floreal Ruiz, and recorded Mano cruel, Un amor imposible, and Por qué la quise tanto for the Music Hall label—the latter achieving unexpected success.

He then continued as a soloist, performing at venues in Buenos Aires, on television, and in the provinces. In 1967, he recorded with José Libertella, and two years later, with Roberto Pansera, he recorded Barriada de tango. That same year, he also recorded accompanied by Carlos García.

In 1974, for the Magenta label, he sang accompanied by the Trío Yumba, as well as two tracks—Estrella and Tu angustia y mi dolor—with accompaniment by a group directed by Dante Smurra. In 1980, he recorded El último escalón with accompaniment by Armando Lacava.

Like many other singers, he performed at various tango venues on weekends. In 1989, he spent several months working at the well-known and popular tango venue El Viejo Almacén as the singer for Ernesto Baffa's quartet, which included Ernesto Baffa on bandoneón, Ado Falasca on piano, Rubén Castro on guitar, and Sergio Paolo on electric bass. He made some performances alongside Lucho Repetto's orchestra, one of them in Mar del Plata, with the singer Jorge Valdez.

He gradually retired from performing due to health problems. In his later years, he managed a shoe store called El Buscapie, located just a few meters from the Primera Junta station at 108 Centenera Street, together with his wife, Gladys Lobato.

He died in Buenos Aires on October 5, 1993.

One of the songs he composed, titled Tabaco rubio, was recorded by Roberto Rufino. Roberto Florio was an emotional, passionate singer who conveyed the songs with precision and, at the same time, had an intimate, warm, and delicate style, with very good pitch and a distinctive personality.
