= José Bragato =

- Born: Giuseppe Bragato; 12 October 1915; Udine, Italy
- Died: 18 July 2017 (aged 101) Buenos Aires, Argentina
- Genres: Classical Music, Nuevo Tango
- Occupations: Instrumentalist; composer; conductor; arranger; music activist
- Instrument: Cello

José Bragato (né Giuseppe Bragato; 12 October 1915 – 18 July 2017) was an Italian-born Argentine cellist, composer, conductor, arranger and musical archivist who, in his early career, was principal cellist in the Colón Theatre orchestra in Buenos Aires, Argentina. Apart from his involvement in classical music he also performed for many years in a number of Ástor Piazzolla's Nuevo tango (New tango) ensembles where his cello solos, which had never before featured in tango, put him in the vanguard of Nuevo tango from its birth in the 1950s. Since then he has done numerous and varied arrangements of Piazzolla's compositions.

== Life and work ==
=== Early life ===
Giuseppe Bragato was born in Udine, Italy, in 1915 into a family of musicians, the fourth child of Enrico Bragato and Erminia Castronin. His father and his father's elder brother, Giuseppe, were both flautists. He had an elder brother, Bruno, a younger brother, Enrique, and two older sisters, Vera and Dina. In 1925, he joined the Jacopo Tomadini Conservatory in Udine, where he sang in the choir and later studied piano; his brother, Bruno, studied flute.

=== The young immigrant ===
Times were hard in Italy after the First World War and in 1927 his father, Enrico, and older brother, Bruno, left for Argentina where they settled initially in Saavedra, a neighbourhood in northern Buenos Aires. Bragato, together with his mother and the other children joined them the following year, in 1928. He continued to study piano whilst, in 1930, Bruno joined the orchestra of the Colón Theatre as a flautist and his father was playing flute in various city orchestras. That same year the city of Buenos Aires suffered severe flooding as the River Plate overflowed its banks and the Bragato family lost everything, including their piano.

In 1930, a colleague of Bruno in the Colón Theatre orchestra, the German cellist and teacher Ernst Peltz, began to give José free lessons on a cello which he provided for him and it was with this instrument that he entered the Manuel de Falla National Conservatory of Music. Around this time his younger brother Enrique started to learn the violin but soon abandoned it in favour of the bassoon. In 1936, the family moved to Córdoba Avenue in the centre of Buenos Aires.

=== Early career ===
Calling himself José Bragato, his first public performances were around 1935, playing Argentine and Paraguayan folk music whilst playing classical music with his brothers and father, Enrico. In 1937 he played in several orchestras of tango and jazz and one of his first jobs as a cellist was in the tango orchestra of Mario Maurano, and later in the orchestra of Juan de Dios Filiberto, where he played with his father Enrico (who was also playing in the Avenida Theatre at that time). With his professional career underway, José was also playing with Paraguayan orchestras such as that of José Asunción Flores, and the Francisco Alvarenga ensemble.

In 1946, he joined the orchestra of the Colón Theatre as a cellist and in the same year he became principal cellist in the Buenos Aires Philharmonic Orchestra and one of its founder members, leaving the orchestra two years later to become principal cellist in the Colón Theatre orchestra. At the same time, José was playing cello in several chamber music string quartets, including the Buenos Aires Quartet and the Carlos Pessina Quartet. Alongside this he was also playing in tango orchestras, including the Orquesta Francini-Pontier formed by the violinist Enrique Mario Francini and the bandoneonist Armando Pontier, and was beginning to compose.

In 1950, he also began conducting orchestras and arranging pieces for various radio stations including the National Radio Orchestra and Radio Begrano. He was a co-founder of the Channel 13 orchestra, together with the Italian musician Lucio Milena, and joined Leo Lipesker and the Primer Cuarteto de Cámara del Tango. During this period he joined the tango orchestra of Atilio Stampone and was invited to play in recording sessions with the tango orchestras of Aníbal Troilo and Osvaldo Fresedo.

=== Nuevo Tango ===
In 1955, Ástor Piazzolla formed his Octeto Buenos Aires and Orquesta de Cuerdas (String Orchestra) and invited José to play the cello as a solo instrument in these Nuevo tango ensembles. Previously the violin had been the only stringed instrument featured as a solo instrument in tango. Nuevo tango, which included novel harmonic and melodic structures, was to change the sound of tango forever. From that moment on José became a fervent admirer and close friend of Piazzolla who would later dedicate one of his tango compositions, Bragatissimo, to him as a tribute to their close association over many years.

During the period 1956-57 José made several recordings with the Octeto and the Orquesta and would later join Piazzolla's Nuevo Octeto, Conjunto 9, and later his New Tango Sextet, the last of his many ensembles. Apart from his numerous performances with Piazzolla, José spent much of his time making arrangements of Piazzolla's music for duos, trios, string quartets and full orchestras which have helped to bring tango to a wide international audience.

=== Years in exile ===
During the period of Argentine military dictatorship from 1976 to 1982, he left Argentina and became principal cellist in the Orquestra Sinfonica de Porto Alegre (OSPA) in Brazil. Three years after leaving Argentina he joined the Universidade Federal do Rio Grande do Norte (UFRN) in Natal, Brazil, where he was a member of the Quartetto UFRN along with Korean violinist Won Mo Kin, Brazilian violinist Reinaldo Couto, and American violist Mark Cedel.

During his time in Brazil, he founded several classical music archives and was the conductor for several chamber music ensembles. At the same time he was becoming recognized as an arranger of Paraguayan folk music, including guaranias and polkas.

=== Later years ===
In 1982, José returned to Argentina and was appointed assessor of music for the Argentine popular music archives of SADAIC (Argentine Society of Music Authors and Composers). SADAIC helps to promote the music of Argentine composers throughout the world by providing free sheet music to non-profit making musical and educational establishments. His last solo performance, when he was 80 years old, was with the Atilio Stampone ensemble in Radio City Music Hall, New York City, accompanying the Argentine ballet dancer Julio Bocca and his company. His composition Graciela y Buenos Aires, a tango for cello and string orchestra, has become the mainstay of the symphonic tango repertoire in Europe where his works are widely performed.

Bragato died on 18 July 2017 at the age of 101 in Buenos Aires.

== Prizes and awards ==
- Honorary doctorate (Doctor Honoris Causa), Universidade Federal do Rio Grande do Norte, Natal Brasil
- Francisco Canaro Award for his career awarded by SADAIC in 1999.
- Prize "Merito a la Trayectoria" by the City of Buenos Aires, 1999.
- Latin Grammy Award in 2002 as composer and arranger of Piazzolla's music for string quartets.
- "Due Mondi" of Friuli, Italy.

== Compositions ==
- A Mauricio (Guarania y Galopa Paraguaya)
- A un Amigo
- Amo Ka Aru lado
- Ave Maria Andina
- Campanas de la Encarnacion
- Chacarera
- Cuatro Fragmentos Liricos
- Cuatro Bocetos Sobre Ritmos
- Dos Canciones Argentinas
- Dos Canciones sobre Ritmos Paraguayos
- El Instante Anhelado
- El Vals de Laura Andrea
- Elsita
- Fantasía Folklórica
- Farra Jhape Sapucai
- Flauta Retozona
- Graciela y Buenos Aires
- Impressionista
- In Memoriam
- Leitmotiv
- Lis Ciancons Che Ciantave Me Mari
- Luz Del Corazón
- Malambo
- Marcha Funebre Para Mis Padres
- Melodía Para Mis Padres
- Mi Paraguay
- Milontan
- Minibi Retia E
- Nieblas
- Noposepe
- Para Adriana
- Para Candy
- Para Gina
- Paraguay - Yasî Retá
- Saudade
- Sé Que Te Perdí
- Solo Una Vez
- Suite For Strings
- Techagaú
- Tres Canciones Paraguayas
- Tres Movimientos Porteños
- Triste y Zamba
- Tu Silencio
- Vanguardista
- Villancico

== Sources ==
- Elsa Bragato, La Vanguardia de Entrecasa, Buenos Aires, 2007.
- Elsa Bragato, Los Bragato en la Musica, Camara del Libro, Buenos Aires, 2008.
