= Leopoldo Federico =

Argentine musician (1927–2014)

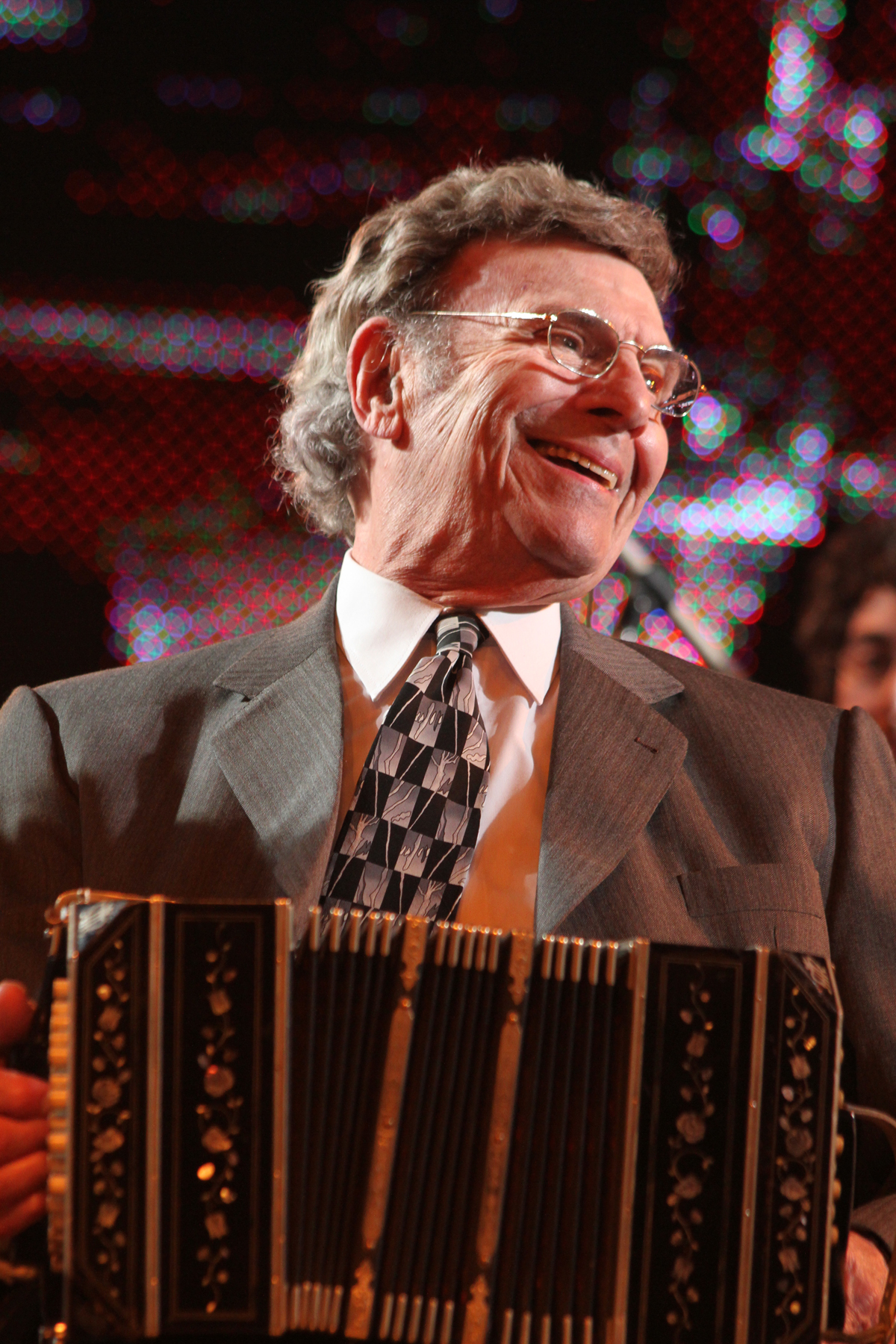
Leopoldo Federico, 2011

Leopoldo Federico (12 January 1927 – 28 December 2014) was an Argentine bandoneon player, arranger, director and composer.

== Life ==
Born in the district of Once in the city of Buenos Aires, Argentina, Federico was one of the most prolific bandoneonists in the history of tango. He was also a member of a number of many major orchestras of the 1940s and 50s, including those led by: Juan Carlos Cobián, Alfredo Gobbi, Víctor D'Amario, Osmar Maderna, Héctor Stamponi, Mariano Mores, Carlos di Sarli, Horacio Salgán and Aníbal Troilo.

By 1952 he was making frequent appearances at the Tibidabo cabaret and was often heard on Radio Belgrano.

In 1966 he formed the Cuarteto San Telmo in collaboration with the famous tango guitarist Roberto Grela who had previously played with Anibal Troilo.

In 1955 he joined Astor Piazzolla's Octeto Buenos Aires and later that year, with his own orquesta típica, he made many recordings with the singer Julio Sosa. He appeared on the Selección Nacional de Tango album En Vivo in 2005. He died on 28 December 2014. He was 87.
