= Amalio Reyes, A Man =

1970 film

Amalio Reyes, un hombre
- Argentine movie poster
- Directed by: Enrique Carreras
- Written by: Norberto Aroldi (screenplay); Cátulo Castillo (story)
- Starring: Hugo del Carril; Jorge Salcedo; Luis Medina Castro; Elsa Daniel; Julia Sandoval; Ubaldo Martínez; Nathán Pinzón; Mario Lozano
- Cinematography: Antonio Merayo
- Edited by: Jorge Gárate
- Music by: Tito Ribero
- Distributed by: Argentina Sono Film
- Release date: 16 April 1970
- Running time: 85 minutes
- Country: Argentina
- Language: Spanish

Amalio Reyes, A Man (Amalio Reyes, un hombre) is a 1970 Argentine drama film directed by Enrique Carreras and written by Norberto Aroldi. It was based on the story by Cátulo Castillo. The film starred Elsa Daniel, Hugo del Carril and Mario Lozano.

== Cast ==
- Juan Alighieri
- Alejandro Anderson
- Guillermo Battaglia
- Pedro Buchardo
- Elsa Daniel
- Hugo del Carril
- Beto Gianola
- Juan Carlos Lamas
- Mario Lozano
- Ubaldo Martínez
- Luis Medina Castro
- Nathán Pinzón
- Jorge Salcedo
- Julia Sandoval
- Miguel Angel Ferreiro
