= Roberto Goyeneche =

Argentine tango singer

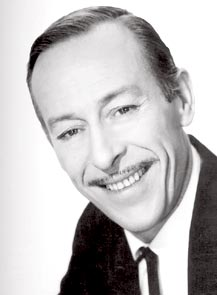
- Roberto Goyeneche

Background information
- Also known as: "El Polaco"
- Born: January 29, 1926; Saavedra, Buenos Aires, Argentina
- Origin: Argentina
- Died: August 27, 1994 (aged 68) Buenos Aires, Argentina
- Genre: Tango
- Occupations: Singer, actor, guitarist
- Instrument: Voice

Roberto Goyeneche (January 29, 1926 in Saavedra, Autonomous City of Buenos Aires – August 27, 1994 in Buenos Aires) was an Argentine tango singer who epitomized the archetype of 1950s Buenos Aires' bohemian life, and became a living legend in the local music scene.

Despite being of Basque descent, he was known as El Polaco ("the Pole") due to his light hair and thinness, like young Polish people of the time. He is identified with the neighborhood of Saavedra, where he grew up.

== Life ==
Roberto Goyeneche was born on 29 January 1926 in the Buenos Aires neighbourhood of Saavedra. He acquired an interest in popular musical from an early age. Despite not having training, he won a singing competition at the Club Federal Argentino in 1944, at the age of 18.

Shortly after he joined Raúl Kaplún's orchestra and gave his live debut performance on Radio Belgrano, while he worked as a bus driver. In 1952, Horacio Salgán took Goyeneche's bus and heard him singing while driving. He then invited him to join his orchestra, where Ángel Díaz gave him the nickname El Polaco.

In 1956, Horacio Ferrer introduced him to Aníbal Troilo. They became friends and Goyeneche joined his orchestra. Together they recorded 50 songs. Troilo advised him to begin a solo career, which he did in 1963. As a solo singer Goyeneche became the first one to record Ástor Piazzolla's classic Balada Para Un Loco.

During the 1980s, Goyeneche appeared as special guest in the movies El exilio de Gardel and Sur, both directed by Fernando Solanas.

At the time of his death on 27 August 1994 in Buenos Aires (Aged 68), he was considered the greatest tango singer active. As a tribute, an avenue in the neighborhood of Saavedra, in Buenos Aires, is named after him.

== Discography ==
- Celedonio (1948), his first recording, made in a private studio, accompanied by guitarists Casinelli and Di Rosa. Unreleased.
- 10 temas con Horacio Salgán (1952–1954). He recorded 10 songs with the orchestra of Horacio Salgán for the record companies RCA (4) and TK (6).
- He recorded 26 songs with the orchestra of Aníbal Troilo. Among the albums on which they were included is Garúa (1961/1962). RCA and TK.
- La máxima expresión del tango (1963), released in Uruguay by the record company Sondor.
- Otra vez Armando (1966), with the orchestra of Armando Pontier, RCA.
- Romántico (1966), released in Uruguay by the record company Antar, series PLP 5057.
- Tres para el tango (1967), with Ernesto Baffa and Osvaldo Berlingieri, RCA.
- Melodía de arrabal (1968), with Ernesto Baffa and Osvaldo Berlingieri, RCA CAMDEN.
- Nuestro Buenos Aires (1968), with the orchestra of Aníbal Troilo, with arrangements and co-direction by Armando Pontier, RCA.
- Las voces jóvenes (1968), with Baffa and Berlingieri, RCA CAMDEN. Goyeneche sings two songs.
- Roberto Goyeneche con Baffa-Berlingieri (1968), RCA CAMDEN.
- Mensaje de tango (1968), with the Orquesta Típica Porteña of Raúl Garello, RCA.
- Barrio de tango (1969), with the orchestra of Armando Pontier, RCA.
- Balada para un loco/Chiquilín de Bachín (1969), with the Orquesta de Cuerdas of Astor Piazzolla, a single that became a historic success, RCA.
- El Polaco y yo (1969), a compilation with Aníbal Troilo, RCA.
- Mano a mano (1970), with the Orquesta Típica Porteña, conducted and arranged by Raúl Garello and Osvaldo Berlingieri, RCA.
- ¿Te acordás, Polaco? (1971), with the orchestra of Aníbal Troilo, RCA.
- Sentimiento tanguero (1972), with the typical orchestra of Atilio Stampone, RCA.
- Goyeneche '73 (1973), with the typical orchestra of Atilio Stampone, RCA.
- Gotán (1972), a compilation with Aníbal Troilo, Horacio Salgán and Los Modernos.
- Interpreta a Homero Manzi (1973), a compilation of songs by Manzi performed by Goyeneche, with the orchestras of Troilo, Pontier, Baffa-Berlingieri and Stampone, RCA.
- Personalidad y tango (1974), with the typical orchestra of Atilio Stampone, RCA.
- Tango en Caño 14 (1975), a compilation including four songs sung by Goyeneche, RCA CAMDEN.
- Che papusa, oí! (1976), with the Orquesta Típica Porteña of Raúl Garello, RCA.
- Percal (1977), with the Orquesta Típica Porteña of Raúl Garello, RCA.
- Nada más que un corazón (1978), with the Orquesta Típica Porteña of Raúl Garello, RCA.
- Con alma (1979), with the orchestra of Armando Pontier, RCA.
- Mi Buenos Aires querido (1980), with the orchestra of Osvaldo Berlingieri, RCA.
- Farol (1981), with the Orquesta Típica Porteña of Raúl Garello, RCA.
- Piazzolla Goyeneche en vivo (Mayo 1982) Teatro Regina, RCA.
- Reunión de maestros (1984), with Sexteto Tango, RCA.
- El polaco por dentro (1985), with the orchestra of Carlos Franzetti, RCA.
- El exilio de Gardel (Tangos) (1985), soundtrack of the film in which Goyeneche sings the song Solo, RCA.
- El poeta y el cantor (1986), a recording of a meeting between Goyeneche and Enrique Cadícamo, in which they select songs by the poet, sung by Goyeneche from various periods. It includes an original version of Garúa, performed by both, RCA.
- Sur (1988), with Astor Piazzolla and Néstor Marconi, soundtrack of the film in which Goyeneche sings several songs, BMG Milán Sur.
- Tangos del Sur (1989), with Néstor Marconi and his ensemble, Melopea Milán Sur.
- Yo canto tangos (1989), an album by Dyango in which Goyeneche participates as a guest singer, Odeón.
- Cantor de mi barrio (1991), with the orchestra of Raúl Garello, M&M.
- Argentina de América (1992), Goyeneche was invited to sing the song Tango de los abuelos, de los padres y los hijos, Melopea.
- Amigos (1993), with Litto Nebbia, Adriana Varela and others, Melopea.
- La conversación (1994), an album by violinist Antonio Agri in which Goyeneche sings Viejo ciego, also accompanied by Esteban Morgado, Melopea.
- Convivencia (1994), soundtrack of the film in which Goyeneche sings Los mareados with Mercedes Sosa, Phillips.

=== Posthumous ===
- Historia de oro (1995), a compilation of live recordings, some performed on the television program of comedian Jorge Porcel, Melopea.
- Roberto Polaco Goyeneche Vivo y Chamuyando (1997), a compilation of live recordings, some made in Japan, Melopea.
- Roberto Goyeneche. Canta y cuenta su historia... con Antonio Carrizo (1999, three discs), Melopea.
- Grabaciones completas para RCA (19 discs), released in 2004–2005, RCA.
