= Cátulo Castillo =

Argentine poet and composer

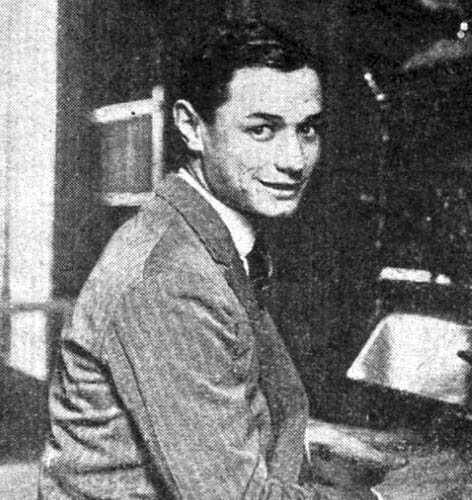

Background information
- Born: Ovidio Cátulo González Castillo; 6 August 1906; Buenos Aires, Argentina
- Died: 19 October 1975 (aged 69)
- Genres: Tango
- Occupations: Poet, lyricist, composer

Ovidio Cátulo González Castillo (6 August 1906 – 19 October 1975) was an Argentine poet and tango music composer. He was the author of many famous works, such as Organito de la tarde, El aguacero (lyrics by José González Castillo), Tinta roja and Caserón de tejas (both with music by Sebastián Piana), María and La última curda (both with music by Aníbal Troilo), and El último café (with music by Héctor Stamponi). The tango La calesita, which he composed with Mariano Mores, inspired the film of the same name directed in 1962 by Hugo del Carril.

His father, José González Castillo, an anarchist, wanted to list himself in the civil registry as Descanso Dominical González Castillo, but was convinced by his friends not to, and kept his other name. As an infant, Cátulo lived in Chile, where his father was exiled because of his anarchist ideology. He returned to Argentina in 1913. Cátulo later affiliated with the Communist Party.

== Professional career ==
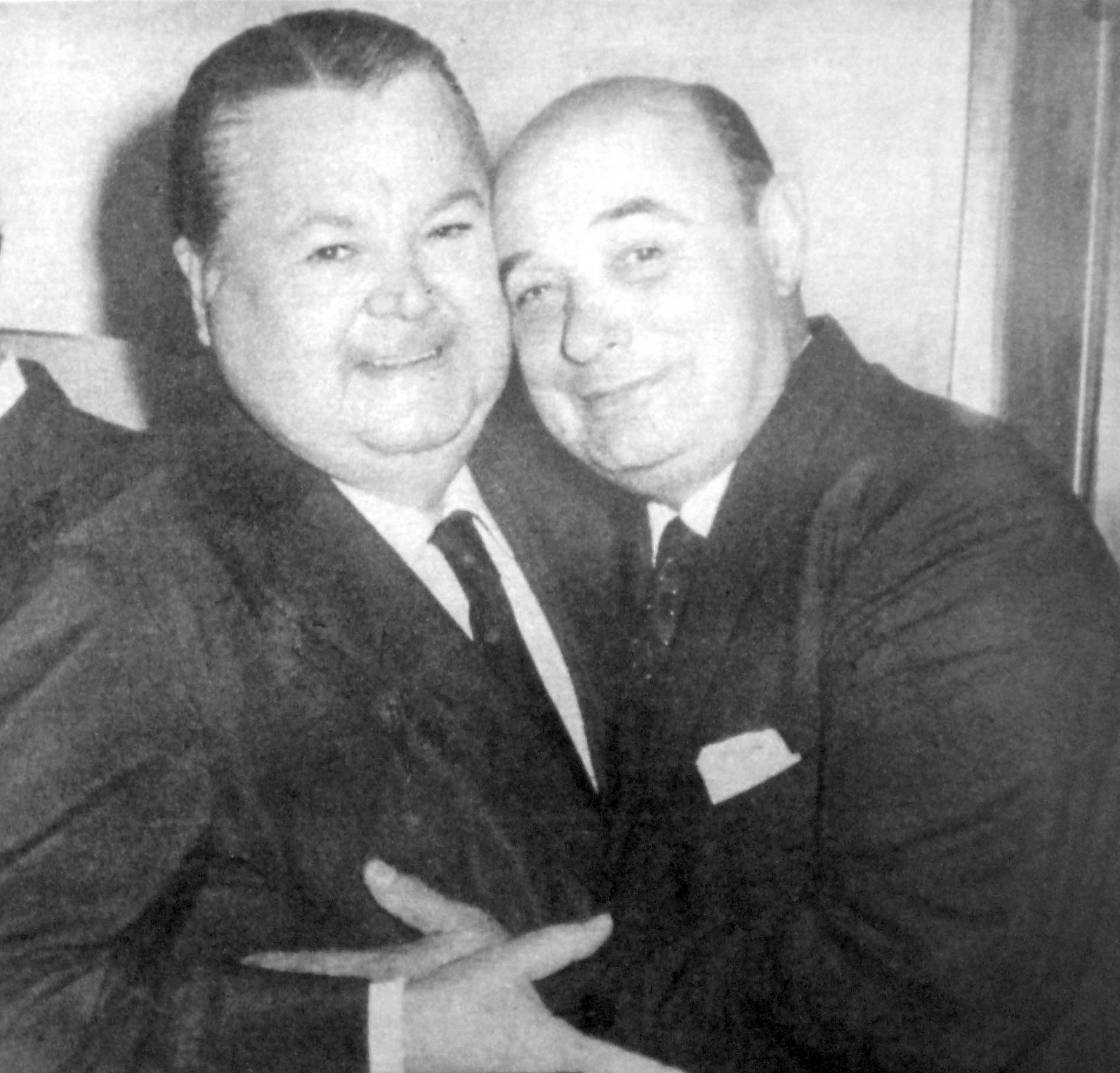
Cátulo (right) with Aníbal Troilo in 1975

Cátulo composed Organito de la tarde, his first tango, at the age of 17. He was also a boxer, eventually becoming the featherweight champion in Argentina and was pre-selected for the Paris Olympics, attending as part of his country's delegation, but not competing.

In 1926, he traveled to Europe, where he would later conduct his own orchestra.

During the 1930s, he obtained one of the cathedras of the Municipal Conservatory of Manuel de Falla in Buenos Aires. In 1950, he would become the director of that conservatory, where he remained until he retired.

During the 1940s and 1950s, when tango was at its peak, he dedicated himself to poetry and wrote with distinguished composers: Mores (Patio de la Morocha), Armando Pontier (Anoche), Pugliese (Una vez), Sebastián Piana (Tinta roja and Caserón de tejas), and his main collaborator after 1945: Aníbal Troilo (María, La última curda, Una canción).

He wrote for many journals, published the book Danzas Argentinas in 1953, composed songs for different films, wrote the lyrical sainete El Patio de la Morocha (with music by Troilo), and was both secretary and president of SADAIC in different years.

In 1953, he became president of the National Commission of Culture of the Nation. Two years later, the military government, the so-called Revolución Libertadora, stripped him of everything he had achieved. His wife, Amanda Pelufo, recalls those times:

"Lo teníamos todo y de pronto, en 1955, nos quedamos sin nada. Cayó Perón, llegó la Libertadora y a Cátulo lo echaron de todas partes. Ya no pudo tener cátedras, ni dirigir SADAIC, ni estar en Cultura. Ni siquiera pudo cobrar sus derechos de autor porque SADAIC, precisamente, fue intervenida. En el peor momento hasta llegaron a prohibir que se pasaran sus temas por radio. No le perdonaron nada. Para empezar que un tanguero estuviera en Cultura. Después que haya sido el primero en llevar el tango al Colón… Vendimos todo y nos recluimos. Cátulo escribía tangos, pintaba al estilo de Quinquela y sobre todo descubrió su amor por los animales. Llegamos a tener 95 perros, 19 gatos y dos corderitos: Juan y Domingo"

Translation:

"We had everything, and suddenly, in 1955, we were left with nothing. Perón fell, the Liberator arrived, and Cátulo was cast away. He couldn't have cathedras, nor direct SADAIC, nor be in [the National Commission of] Culture. He couldn't even collect his copyrights because SADAIC, specifically, was stopped. At the worst moment they even prohibited playing his music on the radio. They didn't forgive him for anything. To start, a tanguero was in Culture. Then, he was first to bring tango to Colón... We sold everything and secluded. Cátulo wrote tangos, painted in Quinquela's style, and above all, discovered his love for animals. We ended up with 95 dogs, 19 cats, and two lambs: Juan and Domingo."

Because of persecution by Pedro Eugenio Aramburu's government, he had to abandon his profession. Included on blacklists with dozens of other tangueros like Hugo de Carril, Nelly Omar, Héctor Mauré, Anita Palmero, and Chola Luna, among others, he was persecuted for his political ideas, and did not return to work until the regime's fall.

With the political thaw in the 1960s, Cátulo returned to his former activity. He continued composing, writing radical screenplays, and working in SADAIC. He published the novel Amalio Reyes, un hombre, which became a film directed by Hugo del Carril. He also published Prostibulario, on his correspondence with Perón, in 1971. Among his most popular songs were: Maria, El último café, La última curda, La Calesita, Café de los Angelitos, Desencuentro, Y a mi qué, A Homero, Arrabalera, Mensaje, Tinta roja, Patio mío, and Caserón de tejas.

In 1974, he was named Illustrious Citizen of Buenos Aires. Upon receiving the award, he told a short fable:

"El águila y el gusano llegaron a la cima de una montaña. El gusano se ufanaba de ello. El águila aclaró: 'Vos llegaste trepando, yo volando'. ¿Pájaros o gusanos? He aquí una pregunta clave."

Translation:

"The eagle and the worm came to the top of a mountain. The worm boasted about it. The eagle clarified: 'You came here climbing, I flew.' Birds or worms? This is a crucial question.

== Death ==
He died 19 October 1975 from a heart attack.

== Filmography ==
Author

- El patio de la morocha (1951)
- La calesita (1963)
- Amalio Reyes, un hombre (1970)
- Perón, sinfonía del sentimiento (1999)

Music

- Internado (1935)
- Juan Moreira (1936)
- Los muchachos se divierten (1940)
- Arrabalera (1950)

Soundtracks

- Ayúdame a vivir (1936)
- Eclipse de sol (1942)
- Buenos Aires a la vista (1950)
- To Live for a Moment (1951)
- La muerte flota en el río (1956)
- Últimas imágenes del naufragio (1989)

Texts

- Ésta es mi Argentina (1974)

== Bibliography ==
- Gobello, José (2002). Mujeres y hombres que hicieron el tango [Women and men who made the tango] (in Spanish). Buenos Aires. Centro Editor de Cultura Argentina. ISBN 950-898-081-8.
- Manrupe, Raúl; Portela, María Alejandra (2001). Un diccionario de films argentinos (1930–1995) [A dictionary of Argentine films (1930–1995)] (in Spanish). Buenos Aires: Editorial Corregidor. ISBN 950-05-0896-6.
