= Kicho Díaz =

Argentine musician (1918–1992)

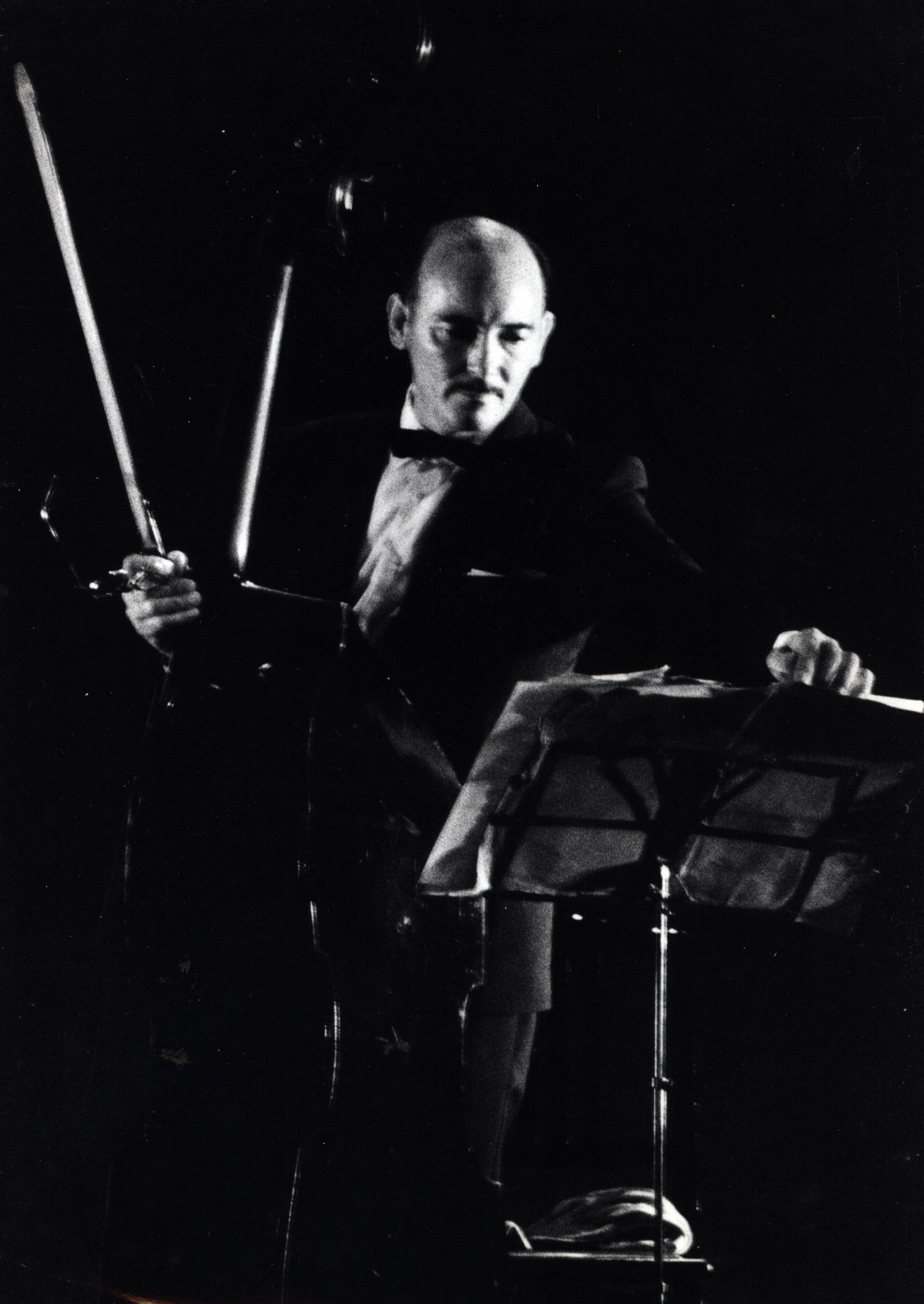

Background information
- Born: 21 January 1918 Avellaneda, Argentina
- Died: 5 October 1992 (aged 74)
- Genres: Tango
- Occupation: Musician

Enrique Kicho Díaz (Buenos Aires, 21 January 1918 – 5 October 1992) was an Argentine double bass tango musician who played in various ensembles including Aníbal Troilo’s orquesta típica, Astor Piazzolla's first Quinteto and Conjunto 9 and finally Sexteto Mayor.

== Biography ==
Díaz, widely known by his nickname "Kicho", was born in the city of Avellaneda in the Province of Buenos Aires, Argentina, and had two older brothers, David, who became a tango violinist and José (aka Pepe) who became a tango double-bass player. He began his musical career in 1935 when he joined a tango ensemble as double bass player with the pianist José Pascual and Anselmo Aiete.

In 1939, he joined the orquesta típica of Aníbal Troilo, which included Orlando Goñi (piano), Roberto Gianitelli, Juan Miguel Toto Rodríguez (bandoneon) and the singer Francisco Fiorentino. Díaz would stay with Troilo until 1959.

He joined Ástor Piazzolla’s first Quinteto in 1960 and later Piazzolla would write the tango Kicho as a tribute to him. In 1968 Piazzolla put together an orchestra, including Díaz, to perform his operetta María de Buenos Aires, and between 1971 and 1972 Díaz played with Piazzolla’s Conjunto 9.

In 1962, he joined Quinteto Real with Horacio Salgán (piano), Ubaldo de Lío, Enrique Mario Francini (violin) and Pedro Laurenz (badoneon) and occasionally played with the orquestra of Mariano Mores. Later in 1976 he joined Sexteto Mayor with whom he played until his death in 1992. He was declared "Tango Double Bass Player of the Century" by the Legislature of Buenos Aires in 2000.
