= Horacio Ferrer =

Uruguayan–Argentine poet and lyricist (1933–2014)

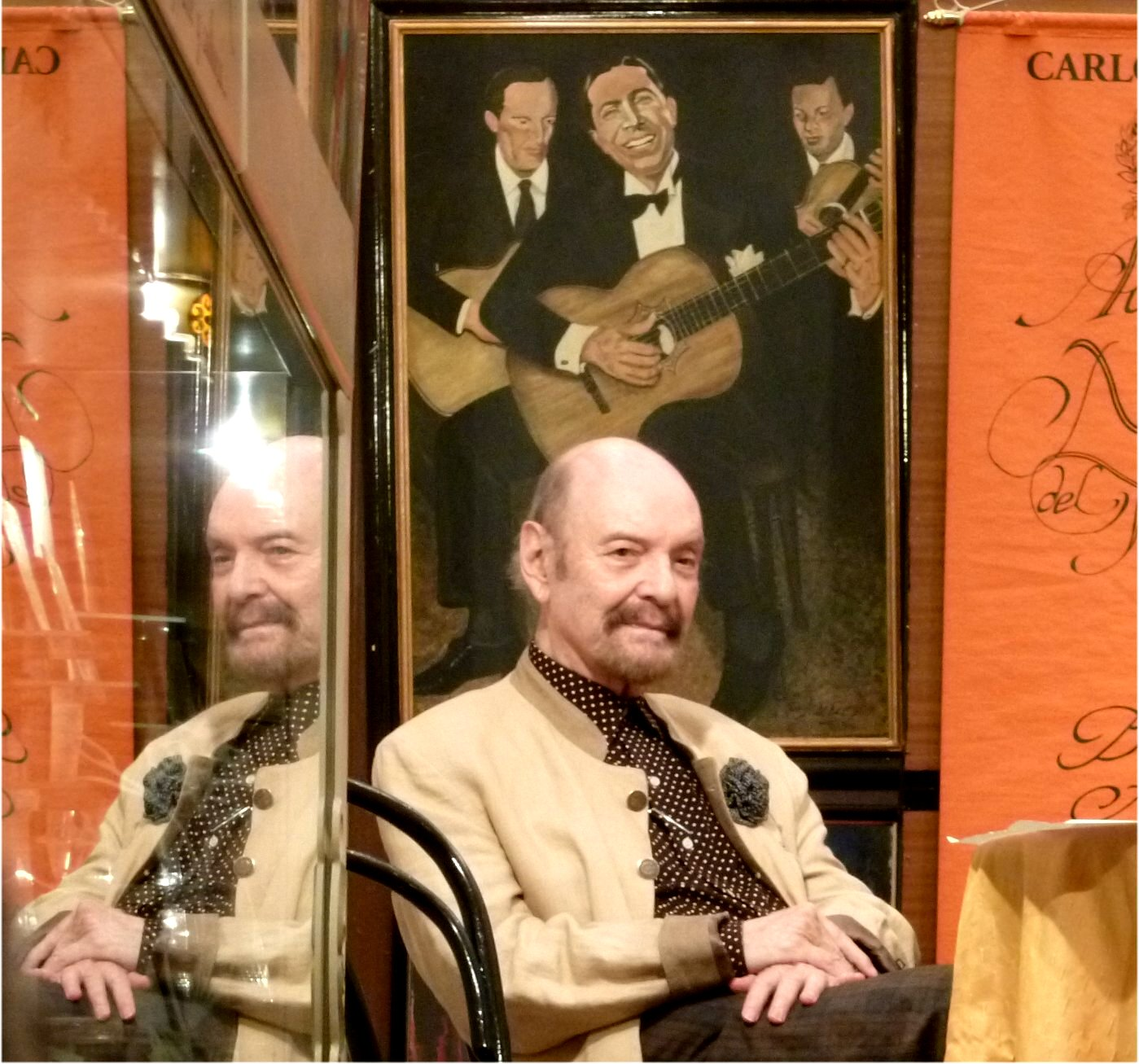
- Ferrer in 2013

Background information
- Born: Horacio Arturo Ferrer Ezcurra; 2 June 1933; Montevideo, Uruguay
- Died: 21 December 2014 (aged 81) Buenos Aires, Argentina
- Genres: Nuevo tango
- Occupations: Poet; lyricist; broadcaster; reciter

Horacio Arturo Ferrer Ezcurra (2 June 1933 – 21 December 2014) was a Uruguayan–Argentine poet, broadcaster, reciter and tango lyricist. He is particularly well known for having composed the lyrics for tangos by Astor Piazzolla, such as Balada para un loco and Chiquilín de Bachín.

== Biography ==
Ferrer was born in Montevideo into an educated family, son of Horacio Ferrer Perez, a professor of history, and Alicia Ezcurra Francini, who was 11 years older than his father and spoke four languages. He had a close relationship with his brother, Eduardo, to whom he dedicated several of his lyrics.

The family paid frequent visits to his mother's brother in Buenos Aires, Argentina, where Ferrer learnt to play tangos on the guitar by ear. Later his uncle would introduce him to the bohemian nightlife of the city.

He studied architecture and engineering for eight years but never graduated. In the 1950s, when he was in his early 20s, he helped to produce the weekly radio programme Seleccion de Tangos in Montevideo, which aimed to promote new developments in tango. Out of the programme grew El Club de la Guardia Nueva which he founded in Buenos Aires in 1954 to organise concerts in Montevideo for those musicians who were helping to revolutionise tango, such as Aníbal Troilo, Horacio Salgán and particularly Astor Piazzolla and his famous Octeto Buenos Aires. Ferrer's first meeting with Piazzolla in 1955, after Piazzolla returned from France, would prove an important turning point in Ferrer's life.

For a period of seven years he edited, illustrated and directed the magazine Tangueando, while the tangos and poems he was writing at that time remained unpublished. Between 1956 and 1959 he studied the bandoneon and joined a small tango orchestra as a bandoneonist. He published his first book in 1959 entitled El Tango: su historia y evolución and until 1967 broadcast programmes about the history of tango for Sodre, one of the radio stations of the official Uruguayan network.

After quitting his studies on architecture he worked as an editor for supplements of the Montevidean morning newspaper El Dia. His career as a tango lyricist began with a request from the renowned Argentine bandoneonist Aníbal Troilo to write lyrics for Piazzolla's tango La última grela.

In 1967 he wrote an anthology of poems, Romancero canyengue. Upon hearing a recording of Ferrer reciting these poems, accompanied by the guitarist Agustín Carlevaro, Piazzolla invited him to collaborate on the writing of the opereta María de Buenos Aires. The work was premiered in 1968 in the Sala Planeta in Buenos Aires with Piazzolla and a ten-piece orchestra, the singers Héctor De Rosas and Amelita Baltar and with Ferrer as reciter in the role of El Duende.

Piazzolla and Ferrer now started to compose a series of tangos, with a clear social commitment, such as the well-known Chiquilín de Bachín and Juanito Laguna ayuda a su madre. In 1969 they composed a series of tangos in the form of ballads, among which stands out Balada para un loco, performed for the first time with the singer Amelita Baltar in the Buenos Aires Tango Festival . Although the performance caused a dispute to break out between supporters and opponents of nuevo tango, the work immediately became a popular success and has remained one of the most representative songs of Buenos Aires. Other songs written by the Piazzolla-Ferrer duo at this time were Canción de las venusinas, La bicicleta blanca and Fábula para Gardel, included in the album Astor Piazzolla y Horacio Ferrer en persona.

In 1970 Ferrer wrote El Libro del Tango. Arte Popular de Buenos Aires, and followed it in 1980 with an enlarged three volume edition of more than two thousand pages which is one of the most detailed studies of tango and became a standard reference work on the subject. He worked with a series of renowned tango musicians such as Roberto Grela, Leopoldo Federico and Raúl Garello and with Horacio Salgán he composed the Oratorio Carlos Gardel in 1975. The following year he wrote lyrics to Loquito Mio with Julio De Caro, Esquinero with Pedro Laurenz, El Hombre que fue ciudad with Armando Pontier, Yo payador me confieso with Osvaldo Pugliese and Tu penultimo tango with Anibal Troilo. Ferrer is responsible for the lyrics of other tangos, including Balada para mi muerte, El gordo triste (written by Piazzolla as a tribute to Aníbal Troilo) and El hombrecito blanco.

In 1983 he acquired Argentine citizenship, and was president of the Academia Nacional de Tango in Argentina from its foundation in 1990.

== Death ==
Ferrer died on 21 December 2014 in Buenos Aires. His funeral was in the city legislature, and then he was cremated in the Cementerio de la Chacarita. His ashes were scattered on the Rio de la Plata.

== Lyrics to music by Piazzolla ==
- Alevare (1968)♯
- Allegro tangábile
- Aria de los analistas (1968)♯
- Balada para el (tango)
- Balada para mi muerte (song, 1968)
- Balada para un organico loco (1968)♯
- Balada para un loco (tango, 1969)
- Bocha (tango, 1981)
- Cancion de los Venusinas (milonga)
- Cancion de los jovenes amantes (song)
- Carta a los árboles y las chimeneas (1968)♯
- Che, Tango, che (tango)
- Chiquilín de Bachín (tango, 1968)
- Contramilonga a la funerala (1968)♯
- El diablo
- El gordo triste (tango)
- El hombrecito blanco.
- Existir
- Fabula para Gardel (evocative poem)
- Final de funcion (tango, 1985)
- Fuga y misterio (1968)♯
- Juanito Laguna ayuda a su madre (tango)
- La bicicleta blanca (polka/tango)
- La nave de fuego (song)
- La primera palabra (walz)
- La última grela (tango, 1967)
- Las ciudades (tango)
- Las paraguas de Buenos Aires (milonga)
- Los pescadores del misterio (milonga)
- Libertango (tango, 1990)
- Los hijos del rio
- María de Buenos Aires (1968)
- María y las aves (milonga, 1981)
- Mi loca bandoneon (tango, 1981)
- Milonga carrieguera (1968)♯
- Milonga de la anunciación (1968)♯
- Milonga del trovador (milonga, 1981)
- Milonga en Ay menor (milonga)
- Misere canyengue (1968)♯
- No quiero otro (milonga)
- Oblivio (1968)
- Poema en si mayor (tango)
- Poema valseado (1968)♯
- Por millones de ninos
- Preludio para el año 3001 (tango)
- Preludio para la Cruz del Sur (milonga)
- Preludio para una canillita (tango, 1972)
- Que buena nueva
- Romanza del duende (1968)♯
- Sera que estoy llorando (tango, 1981)
- Tangata del alba (1968)♯
- Tangus Dei (1968)♯
- Te quiero, che (milonga)
- Tema de Maria (1968)♯
- Tocata rea (1968)♯
- Vals del 18 (waltz, 1981)
- Vamos, Nina (tango)
- Yo soy Maria
- Yo soy el bandoneon (tango, 1981)
- Yo soy vos

♯ from the operetta María de Buenos Aires

== Lyrics to music by others ==
- Bailando en Buenos Aires (tango, Rául Garello, 1988)
- Balada de los recuerdos (tango, Roberto Grela, 1974)
- Balada para un porteño viejo (waltz, Alberto Soifer)
- Canción de mi adolescencia (tango, Osvaldo Tarantino, 1977)
- Celedonio Bécquer (tango, Roberto Grela & Rául Garella, 1974)
- El hombre que fue ciudad (Armando Pontier, 1976)
- Chau, Flaco (tango, Rául Garello, 1990)
- Che Gomina (tango, Rául Garello)
- Cien de abril (tango, Alfredo Sadi & Horacio Ferrer, 1976)
- Ciudadela (milonga, Jairo, 1976)
- Copias del viejo almacén (milonga, Edmundo Rivero)
- Don Quijote de Arrabal (milonga, Alfredo Sadi, 1976)
- El amor cotidiano (song, Daniel Piazzolla, 1983)
- El amor impossible (song, Daniel Piazzolla, 1983)
- El amor secreto (song, Daniel Piazzolla, 1983)
- El pisito de la calle Melo (tango, Raúl Garello)
- El polaco (tango, Leopoldo Federico, 1990)
- El vals del viudo (waltz, Jairo, 1976)
- Esquinero (Pedro Laurenz, 1976)
- La desatada (waltz, Jairo, 1976)
- La loca de la plaza (milonga, Daniel Piazzolla)
- Loquita mía (Julio De Caro, 1976)
- Los afectos (song, Palito Ortega, 1983)
- Los pistoleros románticos (milonga, Alfredo Sadi, 1976)
- Mi zambita rea (samba, Antonio Rodríguez Villar, 1974)
- Milonga para Borges (milonga, Jairo, 1996)
- Navidad el el Abasto (huella, Ciro Pérez & Horacio Ferrer, 1975)
- Oratorio Carlos Gardel (Horacio Salgán 1975)
- Pájaros transparentes (tango, Federico Garcia Vigil, 1982)
- Pequeño tango nocturno (tango, Osvaldo Tarantino, 1973)
- Pipermint (tango, Raúl Garello)
- Porteñesa a Cachorrin (tango, Daniel Piazzolla)
- Porteñesa heroica (tango, Daniel Piazzolla, 1983)
- Porteñesa rea (milonga, Daniel Piazzolla, 1973)
- Porteñesa triste (tango, Daniel Piazzolla)
- Presagio (tango, Hector Stamponi, 1987)
- Qué flor para mi truco (tango, Raúl Garello, 1987)
- Quijotada (song, Daniel Piazzolla, 1987)
- Se rechifló el colectivo (tango, Osvaldo Tarantino, 1978)
- Ser feliz (song, Palito Ortega, 1983)
- Soy un circo (tango, Héctor Stampone)
- Tango del ventanero (tango, Alberto Soifer)
- Tango querido (tango, Daniel Binelli)
- Tocá el bandoneon, Pedrito (tango, Raúl Garello, 1990)
- Tu penúltimo tango (Aníbal Troilo, 1976)
- Viva el Tango (tango, Raúl Garello)
- Vos tenéme cariño (song, Daniel Piazzolla, 1973)
- Woody Allen (tango, Raúl Garello)
- Yo payador me confieso (Osvaldo Pugliese, 1976)

== See also ==
- Astor Piazzolla

== Discography ==
- Astor Piazzolla y Horacio Ferrer en persona (album recorded with Astor Piazzolla, 1970)

== Books and poetry ==
- El Tango: su historia y evolución, 1959.
- Romancero canyengue (anthology of poems, 1967)
- El Libro del Tango. Arte Popular de Buenos Aires (1970 and 1980, collection of essays in 3 volumes)
- Presagio (sonnet, Plaqueta with watercolours by Josefina Robirosa, 1990)
