= Homero Expósito =

Argentine poet and songwriter

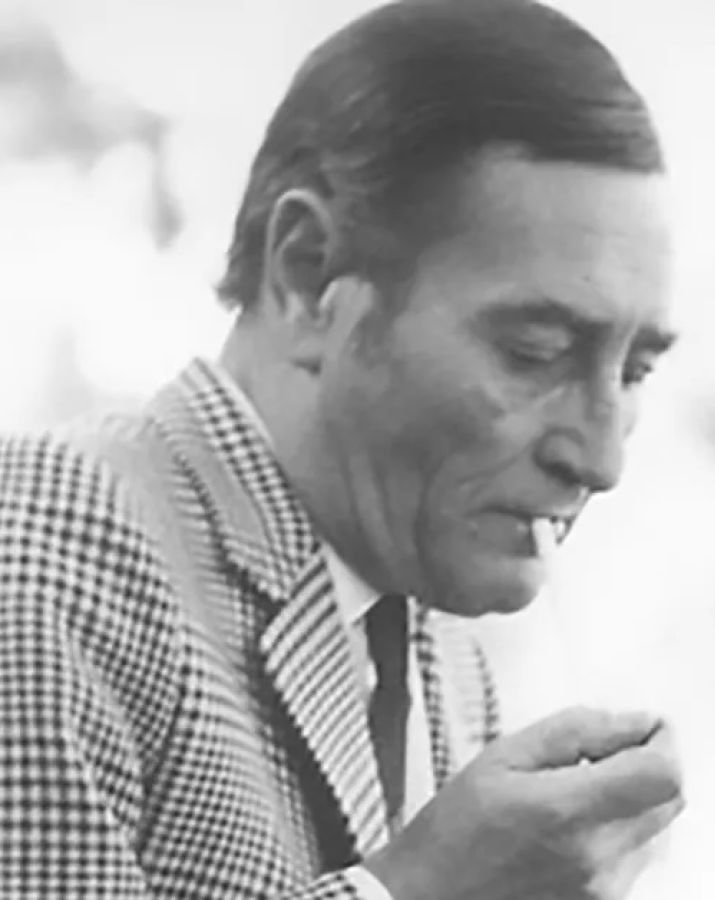
- Homero Expósito

Background information
- Birth name: Homero Aldo Expósito
- Born: 5 November 1918; Campana, Buenos Aires Province, Argentina
- Origin: Argentina
- Died: 23 September 1987 (aged 68); Buenos Aires, Argentina
- Genres: Tango
- Occupation(s): Lyricist, poet, composer
- Years active: 1938–1987

Homero Aldo Expósito (November 5, 1918 – September 23, 1987) was an Argentine poet and tango songwriter. He used to compose with his brother Virgilio Expósito, who was responsible for the music.

== Biography ==
Naranjo en flor (frag.)

Después...¿qué importa el después?
Toda mi vida es el ayer
que me detiene en el pasado,
eterna y vieja juventud
que me ha dejado acobardado
como un pájaro sin luz.

He was born in Campana and grew up in the city of Zárate, a very important city in the development of the tango. The name Expósito stems from the fact that Homero's father had been an orphan and had decided to adopt this surname meaning of unknown origin. From a young age, Homero, along with his brother and the future famous drummer Tito Alberti, were part of an orchestra.

He took his secondary studies at the Colegio San José de Buenos Aires. He created his first tango with his brother in 1938 entitled Rodando and sung by Libertad Lamarque without repercussion instruments. In 1945 he moved to Buenos Aires. On the same level with his work as an author, he dedicated himself to the organization of Argentine musicians, SADAIC, for which he was treasurer for many years.

He composed tangos, not only with his brother Virgilio Expósito, but with famous musicians like Aníbal Troilo (Te llaman malevo), Domingo Federico (Percal, Yuyo verde, Tristezas de la calle Corrientes, Al compás del corazón), Armando Pontier (Trenzas), Enrique Mario Francini (Ese muchacho Troilo), Héctor Stamponi (Flor de lino), Osmar Maderna (Pequeña), Argentino Galván (Cafetín) and Atilio Stampone (Afiches).

== Songs ==
=== Tangos ===
- "Percal"
- "Naranjo en flor",
- "Margó"
- "Flor de lino"
- "Qué me van a hablar de amor"
- "Ese muchacho Troilo"
- "Te llaman Malevo"
- "A Bailar" with Domingo Federico

=== Pop songs ===
- "Eso, Eso, Eso" 1960, sung by Los T.N.T.; one of the first Rock en Español hits.

== See also ==
- Argentine tango
- Pop
