= Carlos di Sarli =

Argentine musician

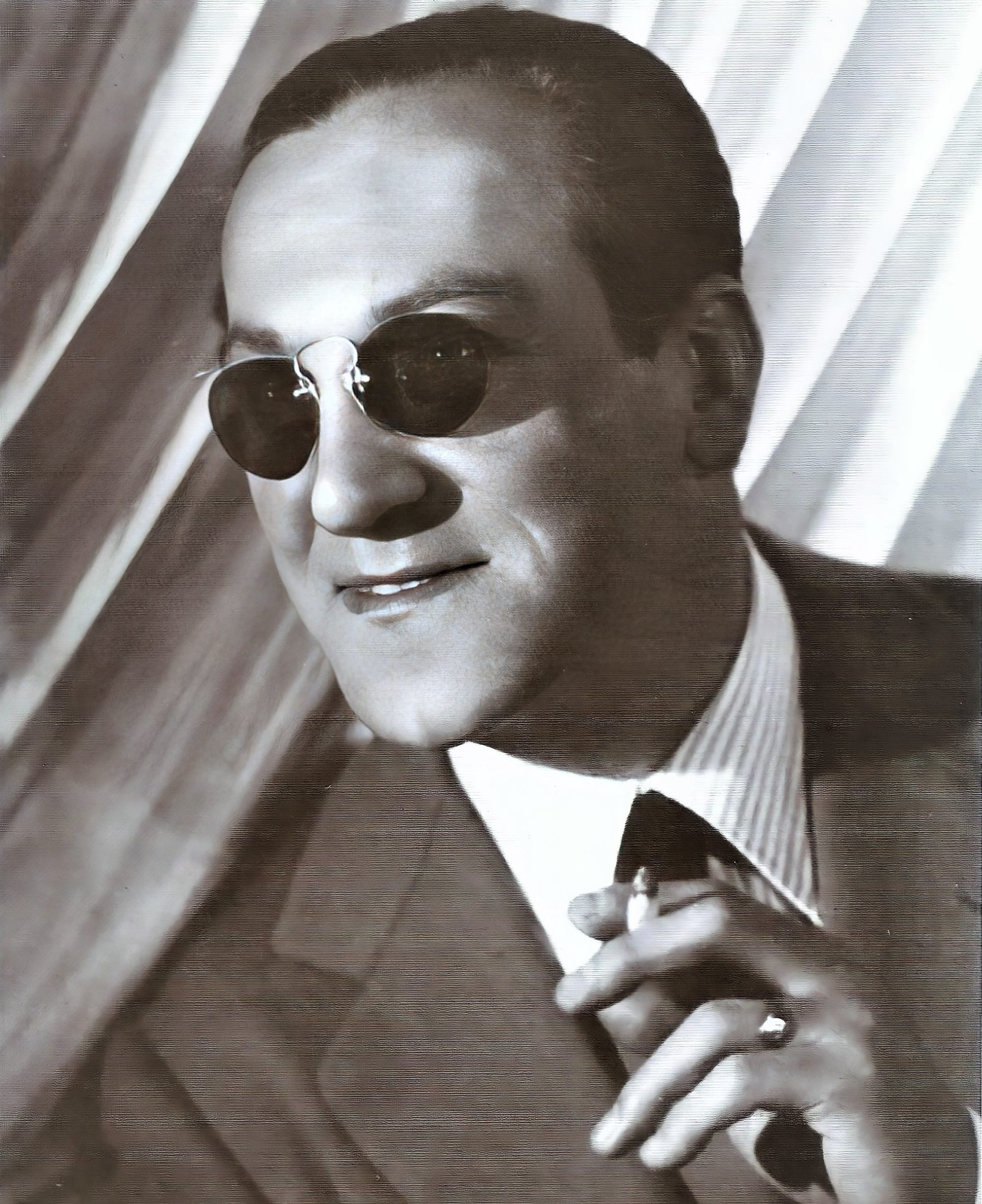

Background information
- Born: Cayetano di Sarli; January 7, 1903; Bahía Blanca, Argentina
- Died: January 12, 1960 (aged 57) Olivos, Buenos Aires
- Genres: Tango
- Occupations: Orchestra director; Composer; Pianist

Carlos Di Sarli (January 7, 1903 – January 12, 1960) was an Argentine tango musician, orchestra leader, composer and pianist.

== Early years ==
Carlos di Sarli was born at 511 Buenos Aires street (now Yrigoyen) in the city of Bahía Blanca, located in Southern Argentina. He was the eighth child of the Italian immigrant Miguel Di Sarli, the owner of a gunsmith store, and Serafina Russomano, daughter of the tenor singer Tito Russomano. Baptized as Cayetano di Sarli in accordance with the solid Catholic tradition of his parents, he later changed his name to Carlos. Music played an important role in the family: Carlos' older brother Domingo was a teacher at the Williams music conservatory in Bahía Blanca, Nicolas, another older child, became a famous baritone, and Carlos' younger brother, Roque, turned into a pianist. Carlos received training in classical music in the conservatory where his brother was teaching.

In 1916, working in his father's store, he suffered an accident that cost him an eye and which forced him to wear glasses for the rest of his life. Once recovered from the accident, 13-year-old Carlos joined a company of traveling musicians, touring various provinces and playing popular music including tangos. Then he moved to Santa Rosa in the La Pampa province where a friend of his father, another Italian immigrant by the name of Mario Manara, owned a cinema and a club. He played piano there for two years, accompanying silent movies and performing early tango songs at the club. In 1919, he returned to Bahía Blanca and set up his first orchestra, playing at the Cafe Express on the corner of Zelarrayan and Buenos Aires streets, and in Cafe Moka, on O'Higgins street. The orchestra also did tours in the provinces La Pampa, Córdoba, Mendoza, San Juan and Salta. In 1923, Carlos and his younger brother Roque moved to Buenos Aires.

== Active years as a musician ==
There, with the help of Alberico Spatola, the composer of the tango El trece and the director of the Buenos Aires police orchestra, he was able to join the band of Anselmo Aieta. In early 1924, Carlos joined an orchestra directed by the violin player Juan Pedro Castillo, and later, the trio of Alejandro Scarpino (the composer of Canaro en Paris). He accompanied the actress and singer Olinda Bozán on her recordings for the Electra label and worked as part of a sextet in the cabaret Chantecler.

Thanks to a recommendation from José Pécora, a violin player, he joined Osvaldo Fresedo's orchestra in 1926 and played at the opening night of the Fénix theater in the Buenos Aires neighborhood of Flores. Fresedo became an important influence on di Sarli's music as well as a good friend. The tango Viejo milonguero, which di Sarli composed around 1927-28, was dedicated to Fresedo. It was around the same time that Juan "Pacho" Maglio and José María Rizzutti recorded the tango Meditación which di Sarli had composed around 1919 but never recorded himself.

In late 1927 he started to set up his own sextet or orchestra tipica (José Pécora and David Abramsky on violin, César Ginzo and Tito Landó on bandoneón and Adolfo Kraus on bass), directing it from behind the piano that he himself played. With the orchestra, di Sarli played live in clubs as well as radio shows in Radio Cultura and recorded for the label RCA Victor. In addition to instrumentals, he recorded with the vocalists Santiago Devincenzi (who later changed his last name to Devin), Ernesto Famá and Fernando Díaz. These singers were hired only to sing the short verses ("estribillos") during the performances and were not constant members of his orchestra, unlike the musicians. Between November 26, 1928 and August 14, 1931, he recorded 48 tracks including the tangos T.B.C. by Edgardo Donato, Maldita by Antonio Rodio and Celedonio Flores, and the Eduardo Arolas compositions La guitarrita and Una noche de garufa.

In 1930, during a performance in the café El Germinal, di Sarli had an argument with one of the café's owners who did not understand that he wore dark glasses on stage for medical reasons because of his accident at age 13. Di Sarli promptly moved with his orchestra to Bahía Blanca, where he performed at the La Central club. In 1932, Antonio Rodríguez Lesende joined the orchestra as a singer. In 1934, for unclear reasons, di Sarli left the orchestra and moved to Rosario in Santa Fe province where he joined a small band with the bandoneón player Juan Cambareri, the violin player Alberto Saikievich and the singer Roberto Pieri. His sextet continued to play without him, later changing its name to Orquesta Novel due to their performances at the club Novelty. At the request of the orchestra's members in 1935, di Sarli rejoined the band temporarily to replace the pianist Ricardo Canataro who was ill at the time.

In late 1938, di Sarli reorganized his orchestra and in January 1939 debuted in Radio El Mundo. His orchestra consisted of Roberto Guisado, Ángel Goicoechea and Adolfo Pérez on violin, Roberto Gianitelli, Domingo Sánchez and Roberto Mititieri on bandoneón and Domingo Capurro on bass. The singer was Ignacio Murillo, soon to be replaced by Roberto Rufino who was 16 years old at the time. On December 11, 1939, they recorded for RCA Victor the tangos Corazón (composed by di Sarli, with Hector Marco's lyrics) and Retirao by Carlos Posadas. He stayed with this recording label until 1949, when he withdrew from tango for commercial reasons.

In November 1951, he returned to the label Music Hall until April 1953 recording 84 tracks with the vocals of Mario Pomar and Oscar Serpa. From June 1954 until 1958 he returned to the RCA Victor label, leaving that year for Philips to record his last 14 tracks with Horacio Casares and Jorge Durán.

The TANGO-DJ.AT Database lists 4,870 different transfers of recordings by Di Sarli from 78-rpm discs, LPs, CDs and digital sources.

== Last orchestra lineup ==
Since 1958, in addition to Di Sarli on the piano, the orchestra included the violinists Roberto Guisado, Elvino Vardaro, A. Rouco, Szymsia Bajour, Carlos Arnaiz, Juan Schiaffino, C. González and A. Rossi; the bandoneón players F. Verdi, José Libertella, Julián Plaza, A. Marcucci y D. Sánchez; A. Sciarretta on bass and the singers Horacio Casares and Jorge Durán. Di Sarli, already seriously ill, gave his last performance on March 8, 1959, in the club Podestá de Lanús, finishing with a performance of Bahía Blanca, his own composition dedicated to his hometown.

== His vocalists ==
During the sextet years, his singers (in chronological order) were Santiago Devin (cenzi), Ernesto Famá, Fernando Díaz, Antonio Rodríguez Lesende, Roberto Arrieta and Ignacio Murillo. In his later years, larger orchestra Murillo was followed by Roberto Rufino, then Antonio Rodríguez Lesende, Agustín Volpe, Carlos Acuña, Alberto Podestá, again Roberto Rufino, then again Alberto Podestá, Osvaldo Cabrera, Roberto Rufino for a third time, Alberto Podestá for a third time, Jorge Durán, Raúl Rosales, Alberto Podestá for the fourth time, Osvaldo Cordó, Oscar Serpa, Mario Pomar, again Oscar Serpa, Argentino Ledesma, Rodolfo Galé, Roberto Florio, and finally Jorge Durán again and Horacio Casares.

== Di Sarli's musical style ==
In the beginning, his music had a simple structure, but over time it matured into a more lyrical, richer, playful and more subtle style which remained popular with tango dancers as it continued to have a clear dancing beat. This clean compás made him a favorite of beginning social tango dancers, while more advanced ones could enjoy the complexity and variations of his music. Because of this, di Sarli's orchestra was among the most popular ones during Carnival balls of his age and can still be heard at milongas in Buenos Aires and around the world today.

Di Sarli moved beyond the style of the guardia vieja of tango and Julio de Caro's avant-garde, preferring to forge his own style without concession to the fashions of the day. While being influenced by Fresedo early on, he soon established his own way. A talented piano player, he directed his orchestra from behind his own instrument. His recordings do not feature significant instrumental solos; the bandoneóns at times carry the melody but essentially play a rhythmical, milonguero role. Only the violins stand out, playing a short solo or a counterpoint melody. He recorded many tracks more than once over the years, often with different singers. Di Sarli's creativity was mostly limited to the left hand piano part, filling in, modulating and accenting his delicate and elegant dancing beat. His reputation for musical elegance got him his nickname El Señor del Tango (The Gentleman of Tango).
