= Osmar Maderna =

Argentinian conductor and composer (1918–1951)

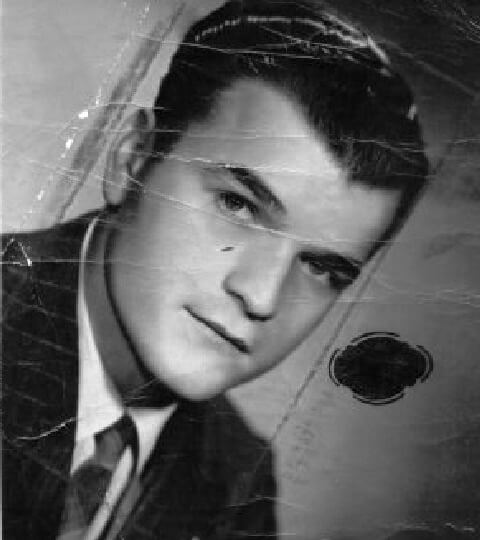
- Born: Osmar Héctor Maderna; February 26, 1918; Pehuajó, Argentina
- Died: April 28, 1951 (aged 33); Lomas de Zamora, Argentina
- Occupations: Musician, pianist, conductor, composer and arranger

Osmar Héctor Maderna (February 26, 1918 – April 28, 1951) was an Argentine musician, pianist, conductor, composer, and arranger.

== Life ==
=== 1918 - 1938 ===
He was the eighth child of the marriage between Juan Maderna and Ángela María Nigro, and from a very young age he felt the pull of music. By the age of five, he was already playing the foot-operated pianola, and his father played the piano accordion at dances.

A few years later, at the age of thirteen, he formed an orchestra with local musicians called “Vitaphone”. By the age of fifteen, he had earned his diploma as a piano teacher. The “Vitaphone” orchestra (named in memory of the record label whose discs had delighted Maderna) was composed of Aquiles Roggero and Arturo Cipolla on violins, José Figueras and Francisco Loggioco on bandoneons, Maderna himself on piano, Alberto Luna on trumpet, and Diego Rodríguez on drums.

=== 1938 - 1951 ===
At the age of twenty, in 1938, he decided to try his luck and moved to Buenos Aires. Before leaving, he told his brother Ángel Maderna that if anyone asked about him, he should say he had gone to buy a bandoneon. In the Argentine capital, he joined the orchestra of Manuel "Nolo" Fernández and stayed at the home of Armando Moreno, the singer of that orchestra. Later, in October 1939, he became part of Miguel Caló’s orchestra, replacing pianist Héctor Stamponi, and remained with Caló from 1939 to 1945.

During this time, at one of the orchestra’s performances, he met his future wife, Olga Reneé Mazzei, born in the city of Bragado. They married in 1947 and had no children. In 1945, he formed his own orchestra.

In 1946, he performed on Radio El Mundo with his two singers, Orlando Berry and Luis Tolosa. His symphonic style made him stand out in the tango scene of the time, and his youth promised a brilliant career. Works such as Concierto en la luna, Lluvia de Estrellas, and Escalas en Azul are representative of his creative drive, in which he combined orchestral arrangements with his virtuosity as a performer.

He achieved commercial success with the waltz Pequeña. His project of traveling to Hollywood to compose film music was within reach. Upon arriving in Buenos Aires, he met Andrés Zaccagnino, an Italian musician who had spent his childhood in Pehuajó. Zaccagnino introduced him to several key figures in tango music, which allowed Maderna to quickly begin his musical career.

=== Death ===
His passion for airplanes also began at an early age. An instructor had taught him to pilot gliders, and during his time in Buenos Aires, he became a licensed civil pilot.

On the afternoon of April 28, 1951, he arrived in his small aircraft at the Monte Grande airfield. As he was about to leave, a pilot named Alberto López approached him and challenged him to an airspeed race. Despite his wife’s objections, Maderna accepted, and both planes took off. Maderna was accompanied by engineer Ernesto Prougenes, and López by another man named Roura.

They flew to Lomas de Zamora and, upon beginning the return to Monte Grande, both pilots began a series of dangerous maneuvers. Suddenly, the two aircraft collided, and Maderna's plane plunged straight to the ground from about 150 meters high, instantly killing both occupants. The other plane managed to glide but crashed into a small structure, and its two occupants died on the way to the hospital.

The accident occurred around 5:00 p.m. on Saturday, April 28, 1951. That night, Maderna’s widow, Olga Mazzei, suffered a miscarriage. Initially, his remains were laid to rest in the SADAIC mausoleum at the La Chacarita Cemetery. Today, and since April 27, 2014, his ashes rest in a monument built in his memory in the cemetery of Pehuajó, his hometown.

== Some works ==
- "Jamás retornarás" (1942, Tango, lyrics and music with Miguel Caló)
- "Qué te importa que te llore" (1942, Tango, lyrics and music in collaboration with Miguel Caló)
- "Trasnochando" (1942, Tango, lyrics by Santiago Adamini and music by Armando Baliotti)
- "Cuento azul" (1943, Tango, in collaboration with Miguel Caló, lyrics by Julio Jorge Nelson)
- "Luna de plata" (1943, Vals, lyrics and music in collaboration with Miguel Caló)
- "En tus ojos de cielo" (1944, Tango, lyrics by Osmar Maderna and music by Luis Rubinstein)
- "La noche que te fuiste" (1945, Tango, lyrics by José María Contursi)
- "Concierto en la luna" (1946, Tango instrumental)
- "El vuelo del moscardón" (1946, Tango instrumental, adaptation of the original piece by Nikolai Rimsky-Korsakov)
- "Rincones de París" (1947, Tango, lyrics by Cátulo Castillo)
- "Volvió a llover" (1947, Tango, lyrics by Cátulo Castillo)
- "Lluvia de estrellas" (1948, Tango instrumental)
- "Pequeña" (1949, Vals, lyrics by Homero Expósito)
- "Escalas en azul" (1950, Tango instrumental)
- "Amor sin olvido" (Tango, lyrics by Leopoldo Díaz Vélez)

== Films ==
- Al compás de tu mentira (1950)
- El ídolo del tango (1949)
