= Julio Sosa =

Uruguayan tango singer (1926–1964)

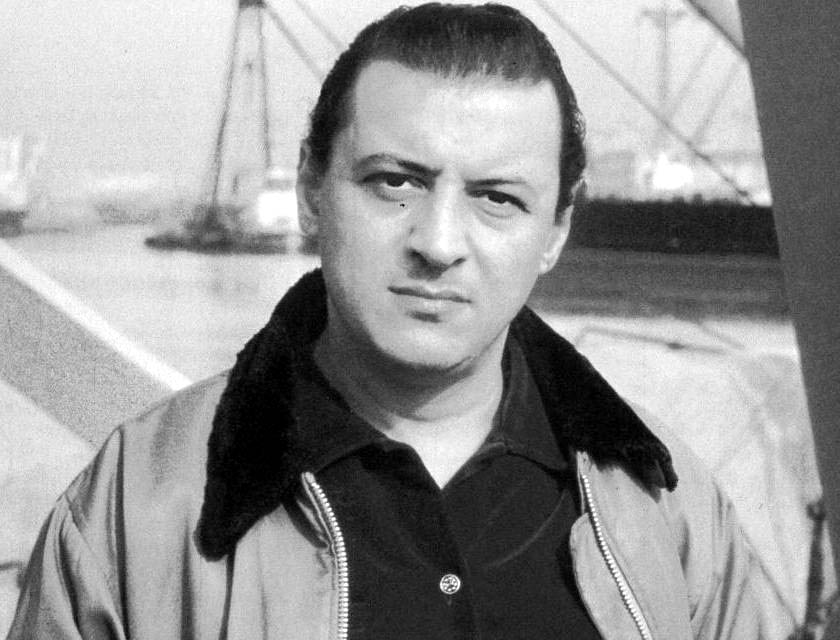

Background information
- Born: Julio María Sosa Venturini; 2 February 1926; Las Piedras, Uruguay
- Died: 26 November 1964 (aged 38) Buenos Aires, Argentina
- Genres: Traditional pop, tango, milonga, folk
- Occupations: Singer, songwriter, actor
- Instrument: Vocals
- Years active: 1940s–1964
- Labels: Sony BMG, RCA, Magenta

Julio María Sosa Venturini (2 February 1926 – 26 November 1964), usually referred to simply as Julio Sosa or El Varón del Tango, was a Uruguayan tango singer.

== Biography ==
Sosa was born in Las Piedras, a Canelones Department suburb of Montevideo, Uruguay. He moved to Buenos Aires, Argentina, in 1949, where he became famous with the Orquesta Francini-Pontier the Orquesta típica formed by the violinist Enrique Mario Francini and the bandoneonist Armando Pontier. Working with numerous other orchestras, he was reunited with Pontier in 1955, with whom he recorded several best-selling albums on the RCA Victor and Columbia labels and became one of the most important tango singers in the genre's history.

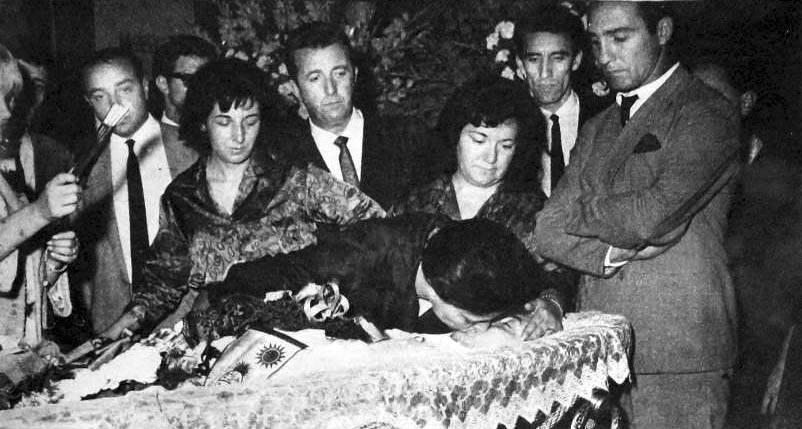
Fans showing their respects to Sosa during his funeral

He married Nora Ulfeldt in 1958 and had a daughter. His marriage ended in separation, however, and he settled into a relationship with Susana Merighi. His towering masculinity and reserved strength earned him the nickname El Varón del Tango ("The Man of Tango"). Sosa also published a book of poetry, Dos horas antes del alba ("Two Hours Before the Dawn"), in 1960. Following his switch to Columbia Records in 1961, the Pontier orchestra incorporated a new bandoneonist, Leopoldo Federico, and the association helped make the group the most successful in its genre, at the time.

Sosa's fame acquainted him with sports cars as well. He had numerous accidents during the early 1960s, mostly as a result of speeding. He was behind the wheel of an Auto Union 1000S Fissore coupé when, in the early hours of November 26, 1964, he crashed at high speed into a traffic light on Buenos Aires' Figueroa Alcorta Avenue, dying at age 38.

== Discography ==
=== Albums ===
- 1961: El Varón del Tango
- 1962: Canta Folklore
- 1962: El Tango lo siento así
- 1963: Reciedumbre y ternura
- 1963: Con permiso, soy el Tango
- 1964: El firulete

=== Most popular tangos ===
- Justo el 31 (1953)
- Bien bohemio (1953)
- Mala suerte (1953)
- ¡Quién hubiera dicho! (1955)
- Padrino Pelao (1955)
- Cambalache (1955)
- Abuelito (1957)
- Seis Años (1960)
- La cumparsita (por que canto así) (1961)
- Rencor (1961)
- María (1962)
- Tarde (1962)
- Mano a mano (1962)
- En esta tarde gris (1963)
- Nada (1963)
- Nunca tuvo novio (1963)
- Qué me van a hablar de amor (1963)
- Milonga triste (1964)
- Guapo y varón (1964)
- El firulete (1964)
- La gayola (1964)
