= Raúl Berón =

Argentinian singer

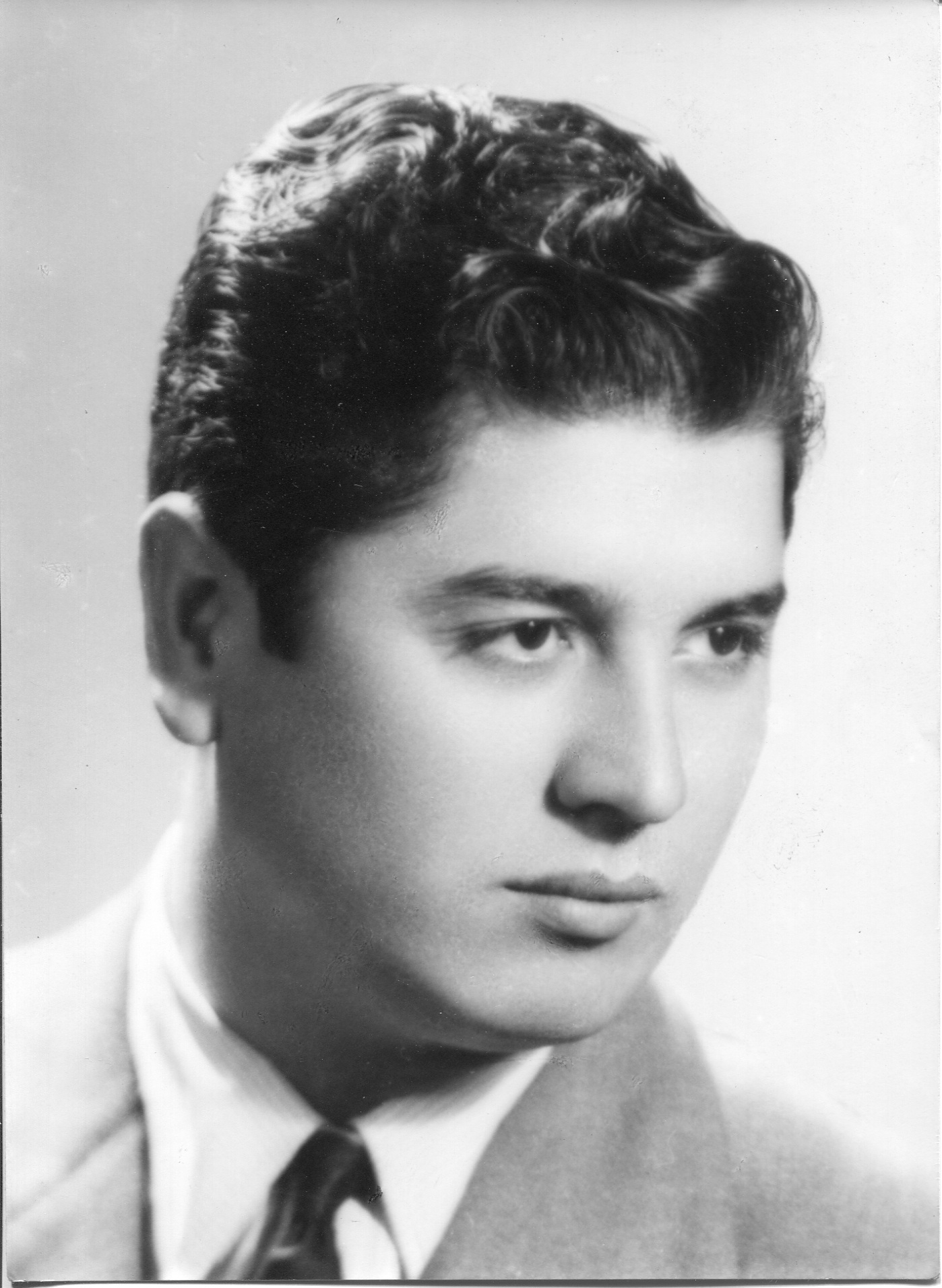

Background information
- Born: March 30, 1920; Zárate, Argentina
- Died: June 28, 1982 (aged 62)
- Genres: Tango
- Occupation: Singer

Raúl Berón (March 30, 1920 – June 28, 1982) was an Argentine tango singer who, between 1940 and 1955, was part of the orchestras of Miguel Caló, Lucio Demare, and Aníbal Troilo.

Born into a family of musicians—his father was Manuel Berón and his siblings were Adolfo, Elba, Rosa, and José Berón—he moved to the city of Buenos Aires and, at the age of nineteen, made his debut with Miguel Caló, with whose orchestra he recorded Al compás del corazón, Lejos de Buenos Aires, Trasnochando, Azabache, and El vals soñador. He later recorded El pescante, Qué solo estoy, and Una emoción with Demare, and De vuelta al bulín and Discepolín (a tribute by Homero Manzi to Enrique Discépolo) with Troilo. He also joined the orchestra of Enrique Francini and Armando Pontier, with whom he recorded Como tú. In his later years, he continued as a soloist, toured throughout Latin America, and made a few reappearances with Caló’s orchestra.

He also appeared in the film Todo un hombre in 1943 and dubbed the voice of Jorge Salcedo for the tangos in the film Mi noche triste (1952). A piece by Roberto Siri was dedicated to his memory after his death. He has been compared in style to Carlos Gardel and even described as "a perfect embodiment of the Gardelian model."
