= Osvaldo Fresedo =

Argentine musician (1897–1984)

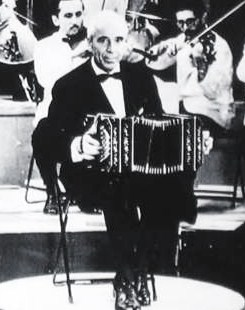
- Born: May 5, 1897; Buenos Aires, Argentina
- Died: November 18, 1984 (aged 87); Buenos Aires, Argentina
- Occupations: Musician, composer, and bandleader
- Years active: 1925 - 1980

Osvaldo Fresedo (May 5, 1897 - November 18, 1984), nicknamed El pibe de La Paternal ("the kid from La Paternal") was an Argentine songwriter and director of a tango orchestra. He had one of the longest recording careers in tango history, from 1920 to 1980.

== Career ==
Fresedo was born into a middle-class family in La Paternal, Buenos Aires, Argentina. His mother gave him the first music lessons. While he was still small, his family moved to a working-class neighborhood, and it was there he began his interest in tango. He learned to play the bandoneón and as a teenager joined several of the most famous orchestras of the era of the Guardia Vieja ("Old Guard").

In 1920 traveled to United States. In Camden, New Jersey he recorded a few albums with a quartet that also included violinist Tito Rocatagliatta and pianist Enrique Pedro Delfino.

Back in Buenos Aires, he formed his first orchestra which, from the outset, displayed his trademark style. Although his style evolved somewhat in the following decades, its essence remained the same: his performing group always displayed true elegance. Fresedo was one of the innovators of tango in the early 1920s, along with such other young musicians of the time as Julio de Caro and Juan Carlos Cobián. All of them brought a high level of musicianship and were thus able to bring about the more refined musical style that characterized the what later became known as the tango of the Guardia Nueva ("New Guard").

In the 1920s, Fresedo worked feverishly as a composer and conductor. Before this time he had already composed "El espiante" ("The Rejected One"), to which he now added "Vida mía" ("My Life"), "El once" (composed for the 11th Baile del Internado), and "Pimienta" ("Pepper") among others.

His activity as an orchestra conductor was tireless, as a result of demand for his recordings and their wide acceptance among the public, especially the more affluent, obligating him to divide his orchestra into four groups and place each in a different nightclub. It was, without doubt, his best time from a commercial point of view, and also probably as a composer of tunes. Between 1925 and 1928, Fresedo recorded about 600 pieces for the Odeón label.

Many of these recordings feature the voices of singers such as Ernesto Famá (the most emblematic of his singers of the era), Teófilo Ibáñez, and Juan Carlos Thorry, among others.

Having left Odeón, and fronting a larger orchestra (which he had already started to form in the early 1930s), he began what we might call his second era as maestro, with a new orchestral style and, above all, with the vocal participation of Roberto Ray (perhaps the most emblematic of Fresedo's singers). The Fresedo-Ray recordings are among the most memorable in the history of tango: "Vida Mia", "Como aquella princesa", "Isla de Capri", "Niebla del Riachuelo", "Recuerdos de Bohemia", among others.

The 1940s brought forward a new generation of musicians—Aníbal Troilo, Osvaldo Pugliese, Miguel Caló, Alfredo de Ángelis, Ricardo Tanturi, Ángel D'Agostino, etc.—and a new characteristic style. Fresedo sought to adapt to these new times, but somehow, this attempt merely detracted from the strength of the fresediano style that had so successfully combined so as successful rhythm and elegance. From this time forward, his orchestrations become slower and he chooses mellifluous singers who even, in some cases, give a certain boleristic air to their versions of his tangos.

Despite the continual changes that occurred in the tango, Fresedo continued to record throughout the 1930s and 1940s on RCA Victor, with Roberto Ray, Ricardo Ruiz, and Oscar Serpa as vocalists. He then went on to record again for several years on Odeón, until nearly the end of the 1950s, with singers Héctor Pacheco, Carlos Barrios, and Armando Garrido. Beginning in 1959 he signed with Columbia Records, where he was one of the first artists to record in stereo.

Fresedo continued to lead orchestras until his retirement in 1980, doing his last recordings that year on Columbia's label CBS Records, for which he recorded with Argentino Ledesma as the last guest singer.
