= Domingo Federico =

Argentine bandoneon player, songwriter and actor

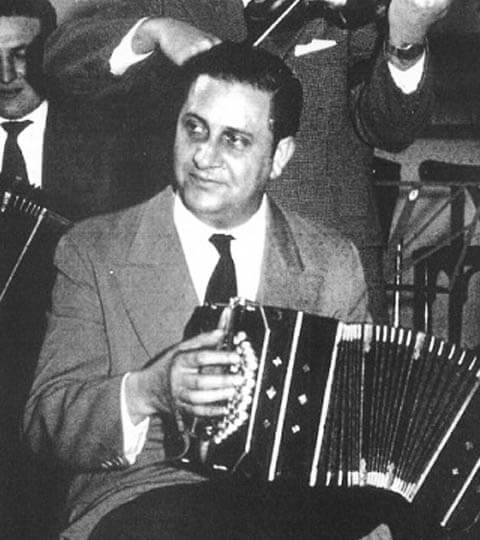
- Domingo Federico

Background information
- Also known as: Don Domingo
- Born: Domingo Serafín Federico; June 4, 1916; Villa Crespo, Buenos Aires, Argentina
- Died: April 6, 2000 (aged 83) Rosario, Santa Fe, Argentina
- Genre: Tango
- Occupations: Composer, bandoneonist, orchestra conductor
- Instrument: Bandoneon

Domingo Serafín Federico (4 June 1916 – 16 April 2000) was an Argentine bandoneonist, songwriter and actor.

== Life ==
=== Early life ===
He began playing the bandoneon and violin at the age of ten, guided by his father Francisco, in Carmen de Patagones. They were living there after having moved from Buenos Aires. Later, they returned to Buenos Aires, where he resumed secondary school.

He refined his skills under Pedro Maffia. He led his first orchestra in 1932. He later directed a "Ladies' Orchestra," in which his sister Nélida Federico also played the bandoneon.

=== Career ===
He performed with the orchestras of Alejandro Scarpino and Ricardo Luis Brignolo. A major breakthrough came when he joined Juan Canaro's orchestra, with which he recorded and participated in numerous performances.

He joined Miguel Caló’s orchestra as first bandoneonist, along with Enrique Francini, Armando Pontier, and Osmar Maderna—forming what was known as the "Orquesta de las Estrellas" ("Orchestra of the Stars.")

He met Homero Expósito, blending music and poetry. Together, they produced:

- Al compás del corazón
- Yuyo verde
- Percal
- Tristezas de la calle Corrientes
- A bailar
- Yo soy el tango

On June 16, 1943, he debuted with his own orchestra, which featured numerous singers: Carlos Vidal, Oscar Larroca, Armando Moreno, Enzo Valentino, and Mario Bustos.

He recorded more than one hundred compositions, but the record label preserved only eighteen masters, which are now collector's items.

In 1957, he settled in Rosario, where he partnered with Haydée Cardón. He led a large orchestra with prominent musicians from Rosario, and featured the voices of Rubén Sánchez and Rubén Maciel. He also performed as part of the "Trío Saludos" on radio and television, and made recordings for Victor, Embassy, and Rosafon, as well as performing at dances, theaters, and in musical comedies.

He conducted 45 tours across Argentina and Latin American countries, and gave 120 recitals in Japan as bandoneonist in Francisco Canaro’s orchestra in 1961, and later leading the quintet "A lo Pirincho."

=== Later life and death ===
Even shortly before his death, at age 83, he continued to lead his University Bandoneón Chair—the first and only one of its kind in the world. He was recording with the "Tango Youth Orchestra" of the National University of Rosario, which he had founded in 1994, and was preparing performances scheduled for April 30, 2000, at Teatro El Círculo.

He died in Rosario, on 6 April 2000.

== Filmography ==
=== Actor ===
- La diosa impura (1963)
- La historia del tango (1951)
- El cantor del pueblo (1951)
- Al compás de tu mentira (1950)
- El ídolo del tango (1949)
- Otra cosa es con guitarra (1949)
- Un tropezón cualquiera da en la vida (1949)

=== Composer ===
- La diosa impura (1963)
- Embrujo en Cerros Blancos (1955)
- El morocho del Abasto: La vida de Carlos Gardel (1950)
- Imitaciones peligrosas (1949)

=== Theme Song Composer ===
- La muerte flota en el río (1956)

=== Music Director ===
- El cantor del pueblo (1951)
- Otra cosa es con guitarra (1949)
