= Miguel Caló =

Argentine musician

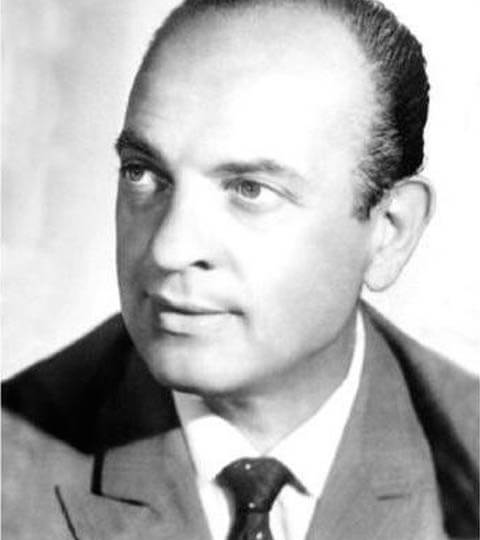

Background information
- Born: October 28, 1907; Balvanera, Buenos Aires, Argentina
- Died: May 24, 1972 (aged 64) Buenos Aires, Argentina
- Genres: tango
- Occupations: musician and composer
- Instrument: bandoneon
- Member of: Orchestra Miguel Caló

Miguel Caló (October 28, 1907 – May 24, 1972) was a tango bandoneonist, composer, and the leader of the Orchestra Miguel Caló.

He was born in Balvanera, Buenos Aires, Argentina.

== Early years ==
Born in the Buenos Aires neighborhood of Balvanera, he studied violin and bandoneon, working with important orchestras beginning in 1926.

== With his own orchestras ==
Caló formed his first orchestra in 1929, which he then dissolved in order to join the orchestra of the pianist and poet, Cátulo Castillo, with whom he toured in Spain. The brothers Ricardo and Alfredo Malerba as well as the singer Roberto Maida also participated in that tour.

Upon returning to Buenos Aires Caló formed a new orchestra with the bandoneonist Domingo Cuestas, the violinists Domingo Varela Conte, Hugo Gutiérrez, and Enrique Valtri, the contrabassist Enzo Ricci, and the pianist Luis Brighenti. Caló eventually left this orchestra to join Osvaldo Fresedo's group, with which he toured the United States.

== Selected filmography ==
- The Tango Star (1940)
