= Armando Pontier =

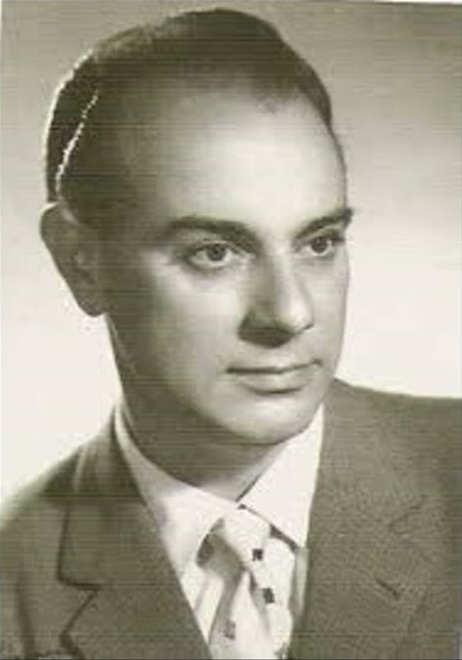

Background information
- Birth name: Armando Francisco Punturero
- Born: August 29, 1917; Zárate, Argentina
- Died: December 25, 1983 (aged 66)
- Genres: Tango
- Occupation(s): Orchestra conductor, composer, bandoneonist
- Instrument: Bandoneon
- Years active: 1930–1970

Armando Francisco Punturero, better known as Armando Pontier (Zárate, Argentina, August 29, 1917 – December 25, 1983), was an Argentine tango musician who stood out as an orchestra conductor, composer, and bandoneonist. He was highly representative of the period known as the Golden Age of tango.

== Life ==
From a very young age, he joined various orchestras, until September 1, 1945, when the orchestra he co-led with Enrique Mario Francini made its debut at the opening of the Tango Bar, located at 1200 Corrientes. This co-leadership lasted ten years. On the same day, but in 1955, Armando Pontier debuted—this time on his own—at the head of his own orchestra.

Over time, Pontier had other prominent singers such as Roberto Rufino and Raúl Berón. The orchestra was based for a decade at Radio Belgrano, and its carnival performances at the Centro Asturiano were famous.

In 1963, he joined the reformation of the Orquesta de las Estrellas (The Orchestra of the Stars), directed by Miguel Caló, along with Enrique Francini, Domingo Federico, Alberto Podestá, Raúl Berón, and Orlando Trípodi.

In 1966, he reorganized his orchestra with the singers Alberto Podestá and Héctor Darío. He later formed a sextet that performed on Radio Municipal and at the Marabú cabaret. In 1973, he once again reorganized his orchestra with Francini and the singer Alba Solís.

== Suicide ==
At midday on December 25, 1983, just a few hours after celebrating Christmas Eve with his family at his apartment on 1500 Cabildo Avenue, Armando Pontier decided to end his life with a gunshot due to health problems.

== Works ==
Pontier was a distinguished composer with many successful tangos such as:

- Margo
- Pecado (together with Enrique Mario Francini and lyrics by Carlos Bahr)
- Milongueando en el 40
- River Plate
- A los amigos
- Corazón no le hagas caso
- Trenzas
- Tabaco
- Claveles blancos
- Anoche
- A Zárate
- A tus pies bailarín
- Bien criolla y bien porteña
- A José Manuel Moreno
- Pichuco

== Film ==
- La diosa impura (1964) dir. Armando Bo
