= Carlos Dante =

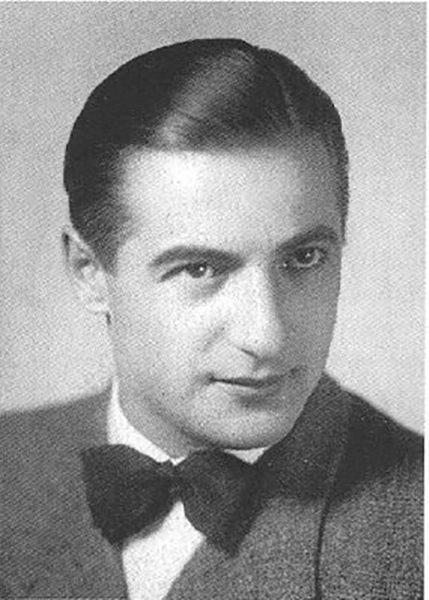
- Carlos Dante

Background information
- Born: Carlos Dante Testori; 12 March 1906; Argentina
- Origin: Argentina
- Died: 28 April 1985 (aged 79) Buenos Aires, Argentina
- Genres: Tango
- Occupation: Singer

Carlos Dante (12 March 1906 – 28 April 1985), whose full name was Carlos Dante Testori, was a popular Argentine singer dedicated to the tango genre. He was part of various orchestras, including a thirteen-year period with the one led by Alfredo de Ángelis. He had been married to Celia Alonso since 1928.

== Early life ==
From a modest family, he was born in the Boedo neighborhood; his father was Luis Testori and his mother María Rufino. He began singing at a very young age in the neighborhood church, where he also served as an altar boy.

In his teenage years, he met the Caló brothers at the local café, and years later, through Miguel Caló, they played a decisive role in his professional career. He worked as an employee at the La Piedad store and later as a model at the tailor shop "Los 49 Auténticos."

== Professional career ==
His professional singing career likely began in 1927 as a refrain singer with Francisco Pracánico's ensemble at the Astral cinema, in performances where, among other singers, Carlos Gardel was also present.

In 1928, he joined the orchestra led by Miguel Caló, which included musicians of the caliber of Anselmo Aieta, Luis Visca, and Juan d'Arienzo, performing at venues such as the Hindú cinema on Lavalle Street. At that same venue, Dante continued as a singer with Pedro Maffia’s orchestra, which at the time featured Elvino Vardaro on violin and Osvaldo Pugliese on piano. During that period, he participated in tours to Mar del Plata, Rosario, and Córdoba, in addition to performing at dances held by Buenos Aires clubs and making his first recordings with the Electra label.

In 1929, through the efforts of Francisco Canaro, he traveled as a singer with Rafael Canaro’s orchestra on a tour that lasted four years through the main cities of Europe. When he returned in 1932, he joined Canaro's orchestra for a few months before becoming part of Miguel Caló’s orchestra.

He left in 1936, when, at the initiative of Agustín Irusta, he formed a duo with singer and guitarist Pedro Noda, who had just separated from Agustín Magaldi. In 1940, they parted ways, and around that time he began working as an administrative employee at YPF, a company where he worked for 17 years.

In 1944, Alfredo de Ángelis, who led one of the most popular orchestras of the time, unexpectedly lost singer Floreal Ruiz, who joined Aníbal Troilo’s orchestra in place of Francisco Fiorentino. De Ángelis, who greatly admired Dante's talent and had become friends with him during a performance years earlier at a theater in Lanús, considered bringing him on.

Carlos Dante was already 40 years old, hadn't sung in years, and was working as an employee at Yacimientos Petrolíferos Fiscales. He initially refused, but De Ángelis convinced him to perform for three months, and they debuted on 1 October 1944 at the Marzotto café on Avenida Corrientes. He was paired with Julio Martel, with whom he formed an excellent duo until 1951, when he was replaced—also with great success—by Oscar Larroca.

The artistic relationship with Alfredo de Ángelis included memorable performances on Radio El Mundo in the popular program Glostora Tango Club, which they inaugurated on Monday, 1 April 1946, at 8:00 pm. This 15-minute segment, described as "The fixer of the great world, within everyone’s reach," presented its "exclusive star for Argentine radio." This collaboration continued until 1957, when Dante and Larroca parted ways with the orchestra after a final performance at the Carnival dances of the Club Provincial de Rosario.

With Alfredo de Ángelis's orchestra, Dante recorded around one hundred and forty songs, including notable titles such as Allá en el bajo, La brisa, Carnaval, Lunes, Melenita de oro, Mocosita, Remembranzas, and Ya estamos iguales.

The singers stayed together for a while longer, and then Dante began his solo career, accompanied by musicians of the caliber of Víctor Braña, Oscar de la Fuente, Jorge Dragone, Roberto Panssera, and Aquiles Ruggero until his retirement at the end of December 1974, after nearly fifty years of performing on a wide variety of stages, supported by an audience that remained loyal to him until his last day.

Carlos Dante died in Buenos Aires on 28 April 1985.

== As a composer ==
Carlos Dante wrote the lyrics for several tangos, with the following list registered with SADAIC:

- "A Magaldi" (1940) in collaboration with Juan Bernardo Tiggi and Pedro Hipólito Noda
- "Cristo redentor", in collaboration with Nicolás A. Trimani and Pedro Hipólito Noda
- "Da Capo al Seño" (1974) in collaboration with Arturo Hércules Gallucci
- "El retrato de los viejos" (1957) in collaboration with Jesús Otero
- "Esta noche me despido" (1949) in collaboration with José Rótulo
- "Novia del sol" in collaboration with Enrique Miguel Gaudino
- "Por eso te quiero" (1994) in collaboration with Reinaldo Yiso
- "Primer beso" (1940) in collaboration with Pedro Hipólito Noda and Héctor Francisco Gagliardi
- "Tu pollera azul" (1965) in collaboration with Reinaldo Ghiso
- "Vive el cantor" (1981) in collaboration with Rodolfo Alfredo Lago and Alfredo De Ángelis
- "Ya te has ido", in collaboration with Héctor Enrique Moggio

== Films ==
In 1937, he appeared in the film Muchachos de la ciudad, directed by José Agustín Ferreyra. In 1941, he was directed by Manuel Romero, and in 1948, he sang the tango Pregonera in the film El cantor del pueblo, directed by Antonio Ber Ciani.
