= Floreal Ruiz =

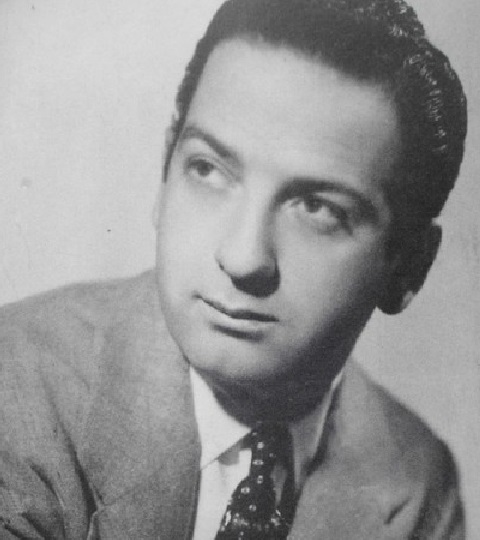
- Floreal Ruiz

Background information
- Also known as: El Gallego, El Tata, Piruco (familiar), Fabián Conde (artístico), Carlos Martel (artístico)
- Born: 29 March 1916; Buenos Aires, Argentina
- Origin: Argentina
- Died: 17 April 1978 (aged 62)
- Genres: Tango
- Occupations: Singer, composer, lyricist
- Instrument: Vocals
- Years active: 1938–1978
- Spouse: Leonor Elisa Videla

Floreal Ruiz (29 March 1916 – 17 April 1978), also known by the nickname "El Tata," was an Argentine tango singer, lyricist, and composer.

== Life ==
He was born in the Flores neighborhood. His first jobs were related to upholstery, his father's trade, and home delivery of milk and bread.

In his teenage years, around 1934, the voices of Carlos Gardel, Ignacio Corsini, and Agustín Magaldi could be heard on the radio, and Floreal was exploring singing by performing serenades with his friend Hugo del Carril.

Despite his father's opposition, he took part in singer selection contests using the pseudonyms Fabián Conde and Carlos Martel. In 1936, he won a competition on Radio Fénix.

== Professional career ==
In 1938, he joined José Otero's orchestra, and in 1939, he recorded the Club Platense March.

In 1942, he made his debut on Radio Prieto using his real name. He had a brief stint with the Armenonville orchestra led by Alberto Mancione, and then joined Alfredo De Angelis’s orchestra as a vocalist. De Angelis needed a singer to accompany the "redhead from Banfield," Héctor Morea. Floreal eventually formed a duo with Julio Martel, who replaced Morea.

The following year, on the suggestion of his friend Alberto Marino, he was hired by Aníbal Troilo to join his orchestra as a replacement for Francisco Fiorentino. He remained with the orchestra until 1948, performing as a duo with Edmundo Rivero and Alberto Marino. In 1944, he recorded the tango Marioneta on a 78 rpm record.

In 1949, he joined Francisco Rotundo's orchestra, forming a trio with Enrique Campos and Carlos Roldán, with whom he recorded records for the Pampa and Odeón labels. He remained with the orchestra until 1955, when Rotundo disbanded it.

In 1956, José Basso brought him into his orchestra as a replacement for Rodolfo Galé. There, he sang alongside Alfredo Belusi, Oscar Ferrari, Jorge Durán, Alfredo del Río, and Roberto Florio. With this orchestra, he recorded forty tangos.

The 1960s was a time when orchestras had to downsize to survive, and singers became soloists. Floreal Ruiz continued singing accompanied by the composer and arranger Osvaldo Requena, recording with the Microfón label and performing on television channels.

He died on 17 April 1978. In the Flores neighborhood, there is a mural honoring him.

== Discography ==
Floreal Ruiz was a lyricist and composer, sometimes collaborating with others. Among his creations are the milonga La cuadrera and the tangos Mundana, Sedas, Mañana no estarás, Y no tenés perdón, Tu beso y nada más, Yo sé cuánto te quise, Dudamos los dos, Te quiero por buena, Una copa nada más, La piba más linda, Sueño cruel, Y luego la besé, and Sombra.

He recorded a total of 148 tangos with the orchestras of José Otero, Alfredo De Angelis (8), Aníbal Troilo (31), Francisco Rotundo (25), José Basso (40), Luis Stazo, Osvaldo Requena, Jorge Dragone, and Raúl Garello (15), on the Odeón, RCA Victor, Pampa, Music Hall, Microfón, and Alannicky labels.

Some of the recorded songs:

- Marioneta (tango), by Juan José Guichandut and Armando Tagini, with the orchestras of Alfredo De Angelis (1943), Aníbal Troilo (1944), and José Basso.
- Déjame así (tango), with the orchestra of Alfredo De Angelis. (1943)
- Cómo se muere de amor (tango), with Néstor Rodi and the orchestra of Alfredo De Angelis. (1943)
- Cero al as (tango), with the orchestra of Alfredo De Angelis. (1944)
- La guitarrera (milonga), with the orchestra of Alfredo De Angelis. (1944)
- Madre (tango), with the orchestra of Alfredo De Angelis. (1944)
- Mi novia de ayer (vals), with the orchestra of Alfredo De Angelis. (1944)
- Bajo el cono azul (tango), with Néstor Rodi and the orchestra of Alfredo De Angelis. (1944)
- Palomita blanca (vals), with Alberto Marino and the orchestra of Aníbal Troilo. (1944)
- Milonga en rojo (milonga), with Alberto Marino and the orchestra of Aníbal Troilo. (1944)
- Naranjo en flor (tango), with the orchestra of Aníbal Troilo. (1944)
- La noche que te fuiste (tango), with the orchestra of Aníbal Troilo. (1945)
- Equipaje (tango), with the orchestra of Aníbal Troilo. (1945)
- Camino del Tucumán (tango), with Alberto Marino and the orchestra of Aníbal Troilo. (1946)
- Confesión (tango), with the orchestra of Aníbal Troilo. (1947)
- Flor de lino (vals), with the orchestra of Aníbal Troilo. (1947)
- Romance de barrio (vals), with the orchestra of Aníbal Troilo. (1947)
- El Morocho y el Oriental-Gardel-Razzano (milonga), with Edmundo Rivero and the orchestra of Aníbal Troilo. (1947)
- Lagrimitas de mi corazón (vals), with Edmundo Rivero and the orchestra of Aníbal Troilo. (1948)
- De todo te olvidas (tango), with the orchestra of Aníbal Troilo. (1948)
- Aquel tapado de armiño (tango), with the orchestra of Francisco Rotundo. (1950)
- Sobre el pucho, with Enrique Campos and the orchestra of Francisco Rotundo. (1951)
- El viejo vals, with Enrique Campos and the orchestra of Francisco Rotundo. (1951)
- Muriéndome de amor (tango), with the orchestra of José Basso. (1956)
- Vieja amiga, with the orchestra of Francisco Rotundo.
- Un placer (vals), with Alfredo Belusi and the orchestra of José Basso. (1958)
- Felicidad (tango), with Alfredo Belusi and the orchestra of José Basso. (1959)
- Como dos extraños (tango), with the orchestra of José Basso. (1961)
- Yo te canto novia mía, with Jorge Durán and the orchestra of José Basso.
- Viejo café, with Jorge Durán and the orchestra of José Basso.
- Buenos Aires conoce, with the Orquesta Típica Porteña de Raúl Garello.
- A quién le puede importar, with the Orquesta Típica Porteña de Raúl Garello.
- Y no puede ser, with the Orquesta Típica Porteña de Raúl Garello.
- Perfume de mujer, with the Orquesta Típica Porteña de Raúl Garello.
- Cuándo volverás, with the Orquesta Típica Porteña de Raúl Garello.
- Divina, with the Orquesta Típica Porteña de Raúl Garello.
