= Oscar de la Fuente =

- Also known as: Manuel Rosas
- Born: Manuel Oscar de la Fuente; September 10, 1912; Buenos Aires, Argentina
- Origin: Argentina
- Died: February 20, 1996 (aged 83) Buenos Aires, Argentina
- Genres: Tango music
- Occupations: Violinist, guitarist, orchestra conductor, composer, arranger
- Instruments: Violin, guitar
- Years active: 1931–1996

Oscar Manuel de la Fuente (10 September 1912 – 20 February 1996), also known by the pseudonym Manuel Rosas, was an Argentine musician specializing in tango music as a violinist, guitarist, orchestra conductor, composer, and arranger.

== Life ==
He was born in Buenos Aires, Argentina. His mother instilled in him a love for the guitar from the age of four, as he imitated her playing the instrument. At six years old, he entered the Juana de Arco Conservatory under the influence of his father, who encouraged him to improve his skills in solfège. Later – at the age of thirteen – he continued his studies at the Manuel de Falla Municipal Conservatory, where he had Cátulo Castillo as his solfège teacher.

He graduated in 1931 from the Buenos Aires Municipal Conservatory and was awarded a scholarship to study in Italy, which never materialized, leading him to temporarily pause his musical activities between 1931 and 1935.

== Professional career ==
In the 1930s, he was part of a trio that performed at dances in the neighborhoods of Floresta, Flores, and Mataderos, playing tangos, waltzes, pasodobles, and foxtrots. In the mid-1950s, he joined Rodolfo Biagi's orchestra, where he remained as first violinist and regular arranger between 1950 and 1960, contributing a new tone to the ensemble and helping solidify several hits in Biagi's repertoire.

In 1959 and 1960, he also worked with the ensembles of Juan Polito, Alfredo De Angelis, and Salvador Grupillo, and between 1955 and 1960, his arrangements were recorded by performers such as Aníbal Troilo ("Intermezzo," 1955) and the Trío Don Rodolfo featuring the voice of Hugo Duval.

After his time with Biagi, he founded his own sextet at Café Nacional and, starting in 1961, recorded for the Bemol record label – whose operations he managed alongside Juan Polito – leading the orchestra Los Tangoleros.

== As a composer ==
Throughout his career, he registered more than 540 works with SADAIC, including tangos, milongas, and waltzes, and worked as an arranger for the publishing houses Korn and Crismar. Some of his most widely known compositions include:

- "Mi alondra"
- "Melodía para una novia" (lyrics by Lorenzo Spanu)
- "Tango soñador"
- "Bailarina de tango"
- "Intermezzo"
- "Dos ojos tristes"
- "Yo supe tener querencia"

== Last years ==
In his later years, he combined his musical work with painting and writing. He died on February 20, 1996, in Buenos Aires.
