= Juan Polito =

Argentine pianist and orchestra conductor

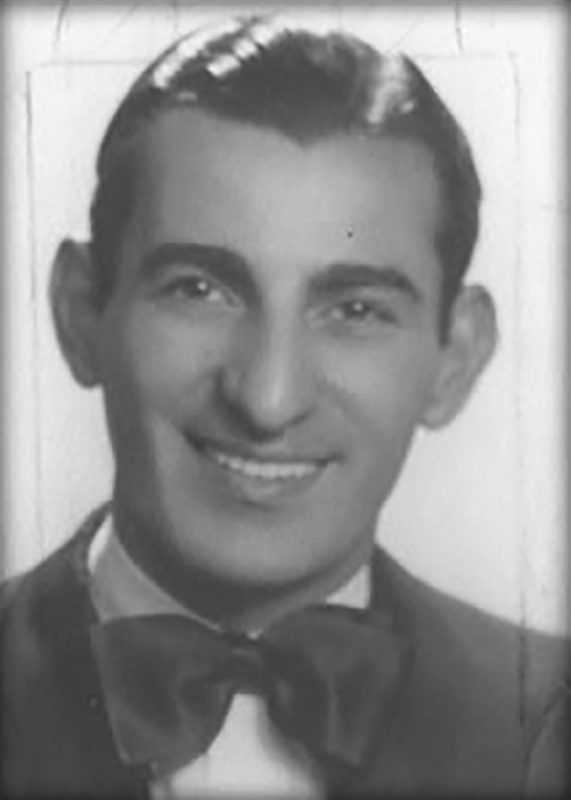
- Juan Polito

Background information
- Born: Juan Polito; 11 July 1908; Buenos Aires, Argentina
- Origin: Argentina
- Died: 25 October 1981 (aged 73) Buenos Aires, Argentina
- Genre: Tango
- Occupations: Composer, orchestra conductor, arranger, pianist

Juan Polito (11 July 1908 – 25 October 1981) was an Argentine pianist and orchestra conductor dedicated to the tango genre.

== Professional career ==
He was born in the Once neighborhood of the city of Buenos Aires, son of the musicians Saverio Polito and Isabel Romano, and brother of Antonio—who played piano, bandoneon, and guitar—Pedro, who was a bandoneonist, and Salvador, a violinist. Juan Polito entered the Fracassi Conservatory as a child to study cello but later switched to piano.

He left the institution in 1925 due to the death of his parents, and the following year he debuted as a pianist with the already established orchestra of Juan Maglio at Bar Domínguez. He stayed three years in that ensemble, which, besides the director, also included bandoneonists Rafael Rossi and Nicolás Primiani, violinists Elvino Vardaro and Emilio Puglisi, and the double bassist Francisco De Lorenzo.

In March 1928, Juan Polito recorded five tangos as a soloist for the Odeón record label, but the recordings remained unpublished and were not commercially released. Later, he joined Anselmo Aieta’s orchestra, playing piano in a sextet that included the director and Luis Moresco on bandoneón, and Dimas Lurbes, Zendra, and S. Menéndez on violin. With this group, he performed at the Germinal and Guarany cafés and on Radio Prieto.

Towards the end of 1928, he organized his first orchestra, with which he performed at the Salón Imperio on Lavalle Street, featuring the bandoneonists Juan G. Bracco—later replaced by Benito Cima—and Luis Moresco, and the violinists Dimas Lurbes and S. Menéndez. Afterwards, he joined the Polito-D’Arienzo orchestra, which was formed for the Carnival dances in 1929 at the Palais de Glace and continued for six months at various venues; besides Polito’s piano and D’Arienzo’s violin, the group included the bandoneonists Ciriaco Ortiz, Nicolás Primiani, and Florentino Ottaviano, the violinists Alfredo Mazzeo and Luis Álvarez Cuervo, the double bassist José Puglisi, and the vocalist Carlos Dante as the chorus singer, who was then 23 years old.

In 1930, Polito reassembled a sextet which he led from the piano in performances at the Salón Imperio, featuring the bandoneonists Luis Moresco and Anselmo Esmella, the violinists Alberto Mercy and Remo Bernasconi, and the double bassist Francisco Vitali.

In the middle of the following year, he was hired by the Brunswick Record Company to direct the Brunswick Typical Orchestra, replacing Pedro Maffia. This group did not perform publicly but only made recordings. Besides Polito, the orchestra included Fernando and Ángel Martín, Armando Blasco, and Félix Verdi on bandoneón; Salvador Polito, Salvador and Eugenio Nobile on violins; and Francisco De Lorenzo on double bass.

In 1937, Juan Polito joined a group called Los Magos del Tango, with bandoneonists Daniel Héctor Álvarez and Nicolás Pepe, violinist Bernardo Sevilla, and singer Pedro Arrieta.

=== In Juan D’Arienzo’s orchestra ===
In 1938, Juan Polito joined the orchestra directed by Juan D’Arienzo, replacing the pianist Rodolfo Biagi ("Manos Brujas"), who had left to form his own group. It was an orchestra that, due to the rhythm imposed by the director, was very popular among dancers, and the piano was a fundamental instrument to achieve that. Two of Polito’s pieces became hits for the orchestra at that time: the tango La bruja and the waltz Castigo, which features lyrics by Luis Rubistein.

He remained with the group until after the 1940 Carnival season, after which all the musicians and the singer Alberto Echagüe left and formed a new orchestra under Polito’s direction. They debuted on Radio Argentina, and by January 1943, they were performing in prime time on Radio Belgrano. In 1950, Polito’s ensemble made some recordings of traditional tunes for the Pampa record label, which did not have much impact.

Meanwhile, Juan D’Arienzo quickly formed a new orchestra that included pianist Fulvio Salamanca, who brought a change to the group’s rhythm, making it more measured—suitable for both dancing and listening. The period with D’Arienzo, which was fundamental in Salamanca’s career and gave him valuable experience, ended in early 1957 when Salamanca left to form his own orchestra with a renewed, modern style and strong vocalists.

D’Arienzo called Polito back, and on May 8, 1957, they recorded the tango Llegando a puerto, by Mario Demarco and Enrique Lary, featuring the voice of Mario Bustos in one of his best vocal performances, thus resuming their collaboration, which continued until Polito’s final retirement.

== Death ==
Juan Polito died in Buenos Aires on October 25, 1981.

== As a composer ==
His first tango is Mano larga, from the year 1924. Notable works include his instrumental tangos Se mira y no se toca and Responso malevo; the milonga Serenata with lyrics by Luis Rubistein; and the tangos Entre sueños, which he composed with Anselmo Aieta and features lyrics by Francisco García Jiménez; Fui, with Juan Alberto Leiva; Gurrumina, with verses by Enrique Dizeo; Quedó en venir a las nueve, with lyrics by Luis Caruso; and Volvé hermanita, with verses by Salvador Polito.

As a tribute to the Chantecler cabaret, where D'Arienzo enlivened the evenings for many years, Juan Polito, Carlos Lazzari, and Ángel Roque Gatti composed the tango Glorioso Chantecler. Later, when the venue was no longer operating but the building still stood, Enrique Cadícamo wrote the lyrics and music for a tango bidding it farewell titled Adiós Chantecler.
