= El irresistible =

Argentine tango

"El Irresistible"
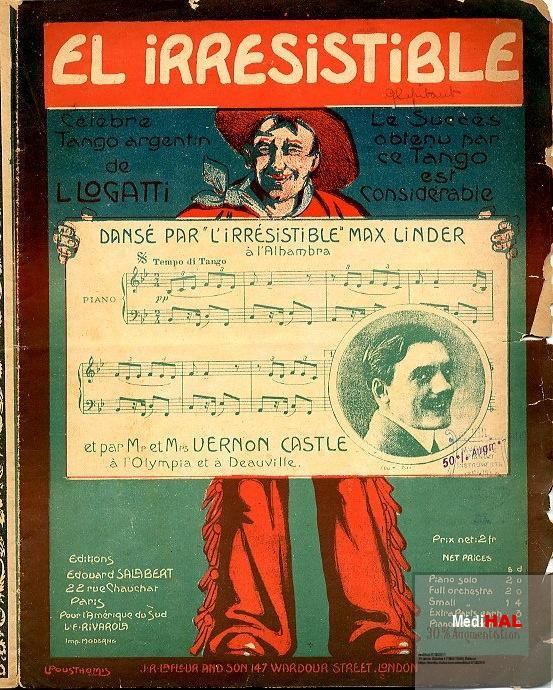

Song by Lorenzo Logatti
- Genre: Tango
- Songwriters: Ángel Villoldo, Carlos Pesce

"El Irresistible" ("The Irresistible") is a tango composed by clarinetist Lorenzo Logatti that premiered in 1908. Lyrics were later written for it by Ángel Villoldo and Carlos Pesce. French silent film comedian Max Linder danced to El Irresistible in his act C’est le tango qui est la cause de ça ("The Tango Is to Blame") at the Alhambra in Paris in 1913.

== Autorship ==
Lorenzo Logatti was born in Foggia, Italy, and was a clarinetist and composer. He studied music in his home country and worked in bands and orchestras. He settled in Argentina in 1896 and worked with operetta and zarzuela ensembles. He composed several tangos, the most well-known of which is El Irresistible.

Ángel Villoldo was a lyricist, guitarist, composer, and one of the leading singers of his time. He is also considered the father of tango (marking the beginning of the genre). The tangos composed by Villoldo are tango-milongas (still in 2/4 time), and among his most remembered lyrics are La morocha and El choclo.

Carlos Pesce was a lyricist dedicated to the tango genre. Among his most remembered works are El esquinazo, El porteñito, Racing Club, Melenita de oro, and El penado 14—the latter being a piece that singer Agustín Magaldi made into a major hit.

== Origin of the name ==
Logatti was part of the orchestra that in 1908 provided music for the Carnival dances at the Teatro Ópera, where a new tango of his composition was premiered. One of the attending couples, after dancing to it, approached the conductor to ask the name of the piece, and he directed them to Logatti. When Logatti replied that it didn’t have a title yet, the woman commented, “It happens to be irresistible,” and right then the musician decided, “Then that will be its title.” He added, “When I publish it, I’ll have the pleasure of dedicating it. In whose name?” “Just put ‘L,’” the lady replied, and that’s how it appeared in the first edition.

== Lyrics ==
Later, Ángel Villoldo wrote lyrics for it, which he published under the pseudonym Mario Reguero, and then Carlos Ángel Pesce added another version. However, it was almost always recorded as an instrumental, except for the 1931 recording by Francisco Lomuto’s orchestra, in which Fernando Díaz sings the first verse of Villoldo’s lyrics.

== Recordings ==
The tango was recorded by a number of prominent musicians, including Héctor Artola, Rodolfo Biagi (1946), Jorge Caldara (1956), Juan Cao (1949), Juan D'Arienzo (1936, 1951, 1954, and 1963), Quinteto Pirincho conducted by Francisco Canaro (1955 and 1959), Osvaldo Fresedo (1943), Ernesto Franco, Carlos García (1957), Mariano Mores with his Orquesta Lírica Popular (1957), Quinteto Don Pancho conducted by Francisco Canaro (1939), Francisco Lomuto, Rondalla Del Gaucho Relámpago conducted by Carlos Nasca (1913), Los Reyes del Compás (1977), the duo Juan Polito – Enrique Guerra, the ensemble Domingo Rullo - Pa’ que bailen los muchachos, Quinteto Oscar Sabino – Los Cinco de Sabino, Sexteto Don Florindo conducted by Florindo Sassone (1966), Atilio Stampone (1964), Aníbal Troilo (1954 and 1967), and Héctor Varela (1960).
