= Mario Canaro =

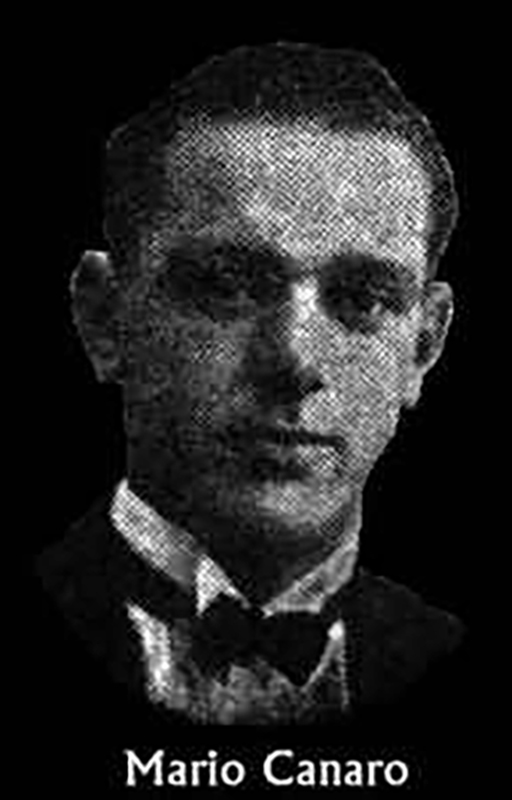

Background information
- Born: Mario Carmelo Canaro; May 14, 1903; Buenos Aires, Argentina
- Origin: Argentina
- Died: June 19, 1974 Argentina
- Genres: Tango
- Occupations: Violinist, composer
- Instruments: Violin, bandoneon, double bass
- Years active: 1920–1974

Mario Carmelo Canaro (14 May 1903 – 19 June 1974) was an Argentine musician renowned in the field of tango as a violinist, bandoneonist, double bassist, and composer. He was the youngest member of the well-known Canaro family, a fundamental dynasty in the history of Río de la Plata tango.

== Life ==
Born in the San Cristóbal neighborhood of Buenos Aires, Mario received his musical training alongside his older brothers, especially Francisco Canaro, one of the most influential figures in tango. In 1927, he traveled to France with Francisco and furthered his studies at the Brussels Conservatory in Paris, where he specialized in several instruments.

Throughout his career, he was part of various musical ensembles and collaborated with the orchestras of his brothers Francisco, Rafael, Juan, and Humberto. His instrumental versatility allowed him to perform in cabarets, cinemas, theaters, radio stations, and popular dances. After Francisco's passing, he took over the leadership of the Quinteto Pirincho, a group founded by his brother.

== As a composer ==
Mario Canaro composed numerous pieces, most notably the tango Quiero verte una vez más, with lyrics by José María Contursi. Originally titled Viejo gaucho, it was composed in Paris in 1930 and later adapted by Contursi, becoming one of the most popular works in the tango repertoire. This tango was performed by artists such as Libertad Lamarque, Francisco Canaro, Osvaldo Pugliese, and Miguel Caló, among others.

Other notable compositions by Mario include Así es el mundo (1924), considered one of the first tangos to feature a chorus singer, and Oigo tu voz, with lyrics by Francisco García Jiménez, performed by orchestras such as those of Ricardo Tanturi and Lucio Demare.
