= Mario Pomar =

Argentine singer

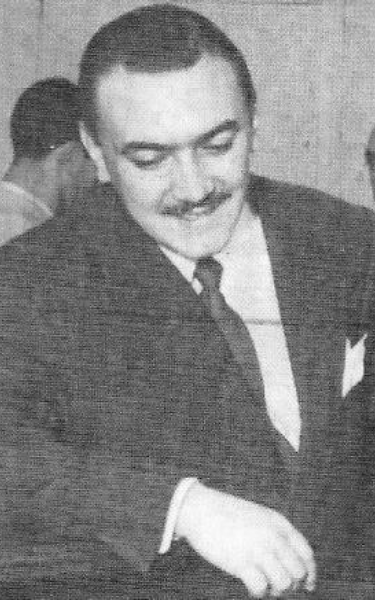
- Mario Pomar

Background information
- Born: Mario Celestino Corrales; 1 April 1920; Buenos Aires, Argentina
- Origin: Argentina
- Died: 21 May 1987 (aged 67) Buenos Aires, Argentina
- Genres: Tango
- Occupation: Singer
- Instrument: Vocals

Mario Celestino Corrales (1 April 1920 – 21 May 1987), better known as Mario Pomar, was an Argentine singer. He stood out for the quality of his interpretations in the tango genre.

== Professional career ==
His parents were Adrián Corrales and Margarita Mac Micking. He began his professional singing career at the age of 18 using his real name, performing with Federico Scorticati's orchestra on LR3 Radio Belgrano.

On May 8, 1939, he made his first recording accompanied by the Orquesta Típica Victor: the waltz Vuelve otra vez by María Teresa Lara, and the ranchera La mentirosa by José Luis Padula with lyrics by Lito Bayardo. He continued with other recordings with the same orchestra, the last one on May 10, 1940, with the waltz Temo, with lyrics by Atilio Gálvez (Atilio Manuel Perasso) and music by Aguariguay (Mario Luis Rafaelli).

In 1940, he had a brief stint with Miguel Caló's orchestra, replacing his brother Roberto, and shortly afterward he also spent a short time with Joaquín Do Reyes' orchestra. Later, in 1943, he joined singer Alberto Serna in the orchestra led by violinist Antonio Rodio, with whom he recorded the milonga Tbú by Tití Rossi and Ricardo Thompson, and the tango Canyengue by Salvador Ripu and Julio Medrano.

In 1946, he joined Francisco Rotundo’s orchestra alongside singer Enrique Campos, and they performed on LR4 Radio Splendid while also appearing at the Confitería La Armonía on Avenida Corrientes as exclusive artists.

In mid-1947, pianist and conductor Osmar Maderna, who had worked with the singer in Caló's orchestra, brought him into his own orchestra to replace singer Orlando Verri, who had left. At that time, his fellow singer in the group was Pedro Dátila. With Maderna, he recorded the tango Ausencia by Alberto Castellanos and Mario Gomila on November 20, 1947.

In February 1951, Carlos Di Sarli returned to the music scene after a two-year absence and assembled an orchestra with musicians of great importance, including Federico Scorticati, Félix Verdi, and Ángel Ramos on bandoneons; Roberto Guisado, Simón Bajour, and Adolfo Pérez on violins; and Alfredo Sciarreta on double bass. He also brought in singer Oscar Serpa, who had previously performed with the orchestras of Osvaldo Fresedo, Horacio Salgán, and Ricardo Pedevilla. Di Sarli also hired Mario Corrales, who, starting with his debut in the new orchestra on March 16, 1951, in the main auditorium of Radio El Mundo, began using the stage name Mario Pomar at the suggestion of the conductor.

After his long relationship with the RCA Victor label, Di Sarli moved to the newly established Music Hall label and recorded the tango Nido gaucho, with lyrics by Héctor Marcó and music by Di Sarli. However, by mid-1954, he returned to Victor.

Después de su larga relación con la discográfica RCA Victor, Di Sarli pasó al sello Music Hall recientemente creado y grabó el tango Nido gaucho, con letra de Héctor Marcó musicalizada por Di Sarli,pero a mediados de 1954 volvió a Victor.

From Pomar's time with Di Sarli's orchestra, several performances are especially remembered: Se muere de amor by Pedro Maffia with lyrics by Cátulo Castillo; Tangueando te quiero by Di Sarli and Héctor Marcó; and Tengo un amigo by Arturo Gallucci and Julio Camilloni—all recorded for Music Hall. Also notable are Tormenta, one of Enrique Santos Discépolo’s most profound works, recorded in 1954 for Victor; and No me pregunten por qué, a tango by Di Sarli and Reynaldo Pignataro, recorded for Music Hall in 1952 and for Victor in 1954.

At the end of 1955, all the members of the orchestra parted ways, and starting the following year, Serpa and Pomar, along with some of the musicians, formed Los Señores del Tango, a group that enjoyed considerable success on Radio Belgrano and recorded for Music Hall. The group remained active until 1960, when they disbanded.

He died in Buenos Aires on May 21, 1987.
