= Alberto Amor =

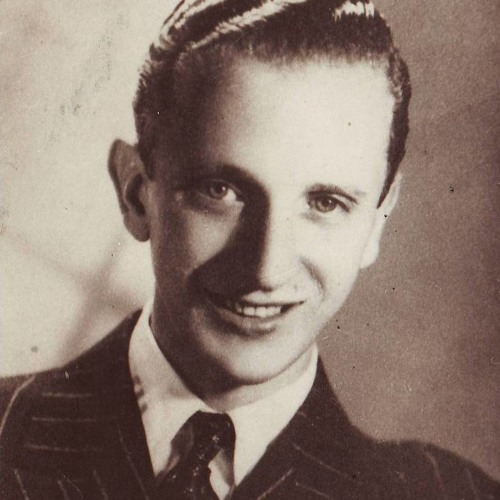
- Alberto Amor

Background information
- Born: Vinicio Guillermo D’Amore; 10 January 1917; Buenos Aires, Argentina
- Died: 1999 Buenos Aires, Argentina
- Genres: Tango
- Occupation(s): Singer, lyricist
- Instrument: Vocals

Alberto Amor (25 January 1917 – 1999), whose real name was Vinicio Guillermo D’Amore, was an Argentine singer and lyricist dedicated to the tango genre.

== Professional career ==
In 1935, Florindo Sassone, who was the first violinist in Osvaldo Fresedo’s orchestra, decided to form his own ensemble and had to choose the musicians and the singer for the new group. For the latter role, he listened to several candidates and selected D’Amore, who was 19 years old at the time, giving him the stage name Alberto Amor. Thus, he made his professional debut on 1 January 1936 on Radio Belgrano and performed at the café El Nacional, known as the Cathedral of Tango on Avenida Corrientes, and at the cabaret Marabú, located at 359 Maipú Street.

In 1937, he performed for a short season with Ciriaco Ortiz's ensemble before quickly returning to Sassone and their successful run on Radio El Mundo. In 1939, he briefly joined Carlos di Sarli’s orchestra, then sang alongside Alberto Lago in Osvaldo Pugliese’s group. In 1941, he worked with Francisco Grillo's ensemble on Radio Splendid, and by 1942, he was part of Antonio Rodio's orchestra—without having recorded with any of them.

In 1943, after the Carnival dances ended, singer Jorge Ortiz left Rodolfo Biagi’s orchestra to work with Miguel Caló, so Biagi hired Amor as well as Carlos Acuña. Both debuted on Radio Splendid.

On 3 March 1943, Amor made his first recording, featuring the tangos Por algo será by Carlos Rivero and Otello Elli, and Arlette, with music by Antonio Bonavena and lyrics by Horacio Sanguinetti. That same year, he recorded additional tangos. In July, he recorded Tres horas by Héctor Varela and Alberto Nery, Si la llegaran a ver with music by Juan d'Arienzo and lyrics by Enrique Cadícamo, and the waltz Prisionero by Julio Carresons and Carlos Bahr. The following year, he recorded Lisón by José Ranieri and Julián Centeya, followed by his first major hit, the tango Nada, which sold many copies. Also from that year are the recordings of Como el hornero and Seamos amigos by Príncipe Cubano and Domingo Rullo.

In 1945, Carlos Acuña left the orchestra and Jorge Ortiz returned. Between 1943 and 1947, Amor made 31 recordings with Biagi, among which, in addition to those already mentioned, the highlights include: Adiós pampa mía, Anselmo Laguna (1945); Café de los Angelitos, Con mi perro, Cuando llora la milonga (1946); Me quedé mirándola by Vicente Spina and Roberto Miró; and Y dicen que no te quiero (1947), the last recording of this period.

In 1949, he formed his own ensemble, with which he conducted major tours in Argentina, Uruguay, Chile, and Brazil—the latter benefiting from Biagi’s popularity, which stemmed from a promotional campaign by the Odeon record label. In the early 1950s, he joined the orchestra of bandoneonist Francisco Grillo, performing at Radio Splendid, the Tango Bar, and the Marabú. The orchestra recorded four pieces for the Pathé label, with Amor singing on two of them: Una página en blanco, by Grillo himself with lyrics by Juan Cirilo Ramírez (1953), and Desvelo (1954).

When the coup d’état of September 1955 occurred, overthrowing President Perón, Grillo—who was a supporter of Perón—left the country, and Amor did as well, undertaking an extensive tour. When he returned after a long time, he left professional singing to go into business.

He wrote the lyrics for the tangos Ragazzina, with music by double bassist Norberto Samonta; Tu ausencia llorarán, with Ángel Urbino; and the zamba Zamba y ausencia, with Sabino Alfonso Ciorciari.

He died in Buenos Aires in 1999.
