= Jorge Argentino Fernández =

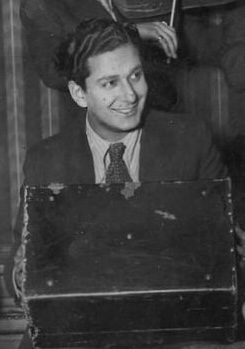
- Jorge Argentino Fernández in Elvino Vardaro's orchestra

Background information
- Birth name: Jorge Argentino Fernández
- Born: 18 June 1915 (age 110) Buenos Aires, Argentina
- Died: 20 May 2002 (aged 86) Buenos Aires, Argentina
- Genres: Tango
- Occupation(s): Bandoneonist, orchestra conductor, composer
- Instrument: Bandoneon
- Years active: 1929–1970

Jorge Argentino Fernández (18 June 1915 – 20 May 2002) was an Argentine bandoneonist, orchestra conductor, and tango composer.

== Early years ==
Fernández was born in the Villa Crespo neighborhood of Buenos Aires in 1915. From a young age, he showed an interest in music: his father had bought a bandoneon for his older brother, which led to his first lessons on the instrument.

He began his training with an uncle and later continued his studies with the maestros Anselmo Aieta and Mario Maurano.

== Professional career ==
At the age of 14, he made his professional debut in Anselmo Aieta's orchestra, and shortly afterward joined Manuel Buzón's group. In 1932, he joined Francisco Lomuto's orchestra and performed briefly with Juan D'Arienzo's (according to the Visca label).

At the age of 18, he was invited to join the famous sextet of Elvino Vardaro, where he played bandoneon alongside Aníbal Troilo, Hugo Baralis, Pedro Caracciolo, and Osvaldo Pugliese. This ensemble, known as the Germinal Sextet, debuted at the Tabarís cabaret and later performed with great success at Café Germinal until its dissolution in 1935.

In 1938, Fernández performed alongside Vardaro in the Cuarteto del ’900, directed by Feliciano Brunelli.

Between 1940 and 1941, he was part of Rodolfo Biagi’s orchestra. In 1942, he debuted with his own orchestral group on LR6 Radio Mitre; shortly afterward, he secured contracts to perform on LR3 Radio Belgrano, at Café El Nacional, and at the Salón Les Ambassadeurs.

In 1946, his ensemble featured the singer Jorge Ortiz, although the collaboration lasted only one year. He was later invited to lead the inaugural orchestra of LR1 Radio El Mundo, where he remained until 1950.

In 1951, he was signed by the Pampa label (a subsidiary of Odeón), with which he recorded two instrumentals: "Arrabal" (by José Pascual) and "Contratiempo" (by Astor Piazzolla).

The following year, his orchestra appeared in broadcasts on Channel 7 television alongside singer Alberto “Cholo” Aguirre. In the early 1960s, as interest in tango declined, he dissolved his orchestra and continued performing with a trio.

In 1967, he returned to recording with his trio, once again accompanied by pianist José Pascual, and even carried out a radio series on Radio Nacional. In 1970, he recorded his final pieces with a trio composed of Roberto Zanoni (piano) and Ángel “Pichuco” Cardozo (double bass). At the same time, he gradually stepped away from music to work at the state-owned oil company YPF, where he held important positions until his retirement.

In addition to his work as a performer and conductor, Fernández left behind some compositions. Among his most remembered tangos are “Pena de amor” (lyrics by José María Contursi), “Otra vez” (also with Contursi), and “Ayer y hoy.”

He died in Buenos Aires on May 20, 2002.

Critic Abel Palermo described him as “one of the artists who most dignified and contributed to the development of our urban music.”
