= Jorge Caldara =

Argentine bandoneonist, orchestra conductor, and composer

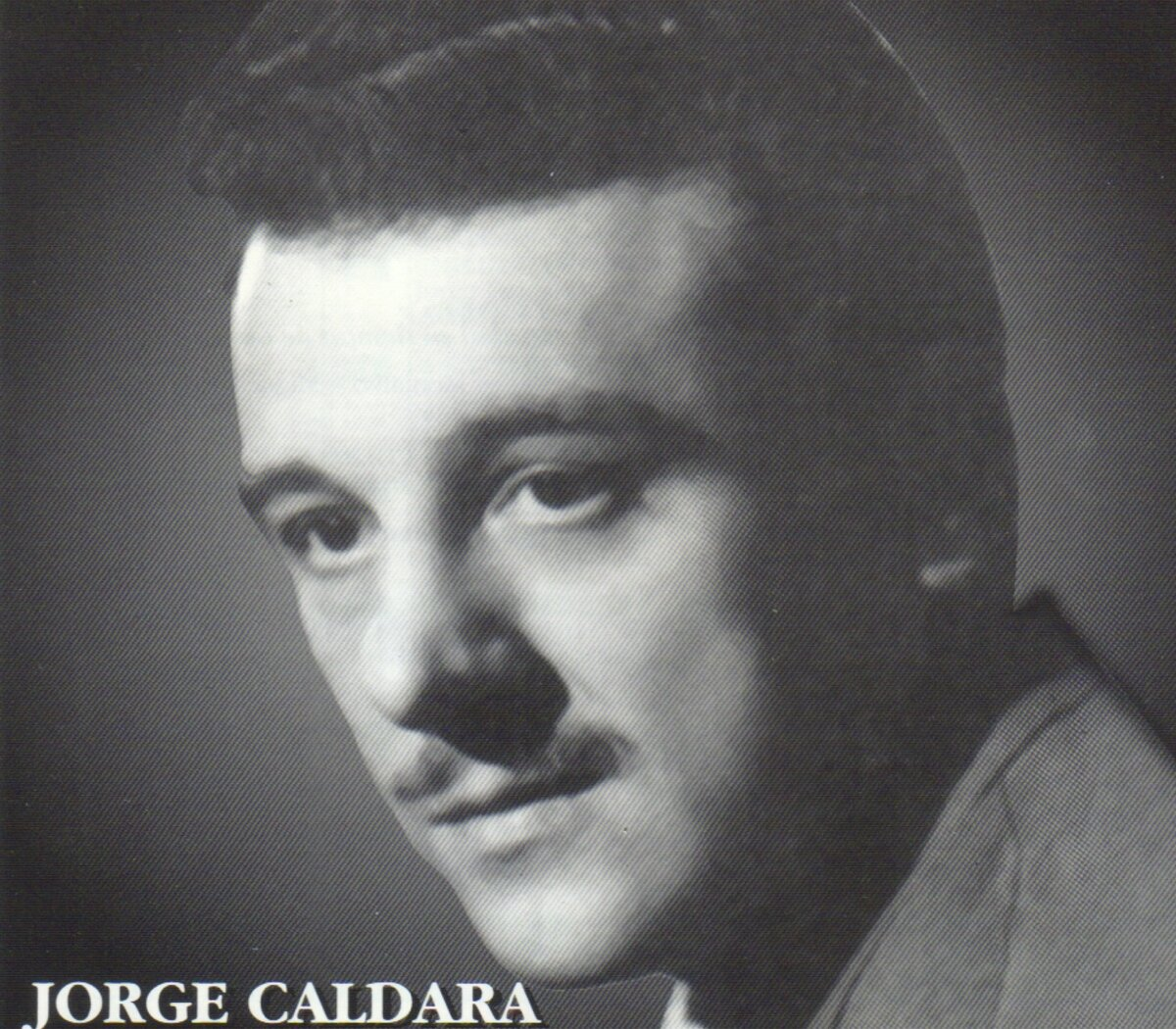
- Born: 7 September 1924; Buenos Aires, Argentina
- Died: 24 August 1967 (aged 42); Buenos Aires, Argentina
- Occupation(s): Bandoneonist, composer, orchestra conductor

Jorge Caldara (17 September 1924 – 24 August 1967) was an Argentine bandoneonist, orchestra conductor, and composer dedicated to the tango genre. In addition to leading his own orchestra, he played in the orchestras of Francisco Lauro, Alberto Pugliese, Emilio Orlando, and Osvaldo Pugliese, where he reached his peak as a musician, arranger, and composer, among others. As a composer, he is remembered for his tangos Pastoral, Pasional, and Por pecadora, among others.

== Life ==
Jorge Caldara was born in the Abasto neighborhood and was 4 years old when his family moved to La Paternal, still within the city of Buenos Aires. He liked music from a young age, especially the piano, but his father, who was a tango enthusiast, convinced him to study bandoneón with a local teacher. Due to financial reasons, he had to abandon those studies and work as a laborer, first in a cardboard factory and later in another that made rocker arms.

== Professional career ==
At the age of 14, he managed to join the orchestra of "El Cieguito" Tarantini, which performed at Café El Nacional on Avenida Corrientes. There, he realized he lacked the necessary knowledge, so he sought to acquire it by taking lessons from Minotto Di Cicco, Carlos Marcucci, and later, Félix Lipesker. Better prepared, he formed a neighborhood group with fellow students called the Orquesta Juvenil Buenos Aires, whose singer would later achieve success under the name Rodolfo Galé. This group performed at Café Germinal on Corrientes Street on Tuesdays, alternating with Aníbal Troilo’s orchestra.

The group disbanded, and Caldara was hired by Francisco Lauro to join his Orquesta Típica Los Mendocinos, a name that came from their performances at the restaurant Un Rincón de Mendoza. In 1939, he joined the bandoneon section of the orchestra led by violinist Alberto Pugliese, which that year performed at summer dances on the grounds of the Argentine Rural Society in Palermo and on Radio Del Pueblo.

In 1944, Caldara left his musical activities to fulfill mandatory military service in the Regiment of Patricians, located in the Palermo neighborhood, until—thanks to permission from his superiors—he was able to join the orchestra of bandoneonist Emilio Orlando, which performed on Radio El Mundo with singer José Berón. There, his talent earned him the role of bandoneonista cadenero (lead bandoneonist), despite being the orchestra's second bandoneon player.

Around 1944, Osvaldo Pugliese had to reorganize his orchestra due to the departure of bandoneonists Enrique Alessio, Quiroga, and Osvaldo Roscini. He replaced them with Caldara, Esteban Enrique Gilardi, and Oscar Castagniaro. Pugliese himself stated that he chose Caldara because of his strong personality, which had the power to drive and inspire the other bandoneonists during performances. Alongside Osvaldo Ruggiero, who had been with the orchestra since August 1939, Caldara formed an outstanding duo that was highly appreciated by the orchestra's followers.

For more than 10 years, he worked with Pugliese, performing on Radio El Mundo, at dances, on tours, and in recordings. Among those recordings were his tangos Patético (1948), Pastoral (1950), Pasional (1951), and Por pecadora (1952). His affection, respect, and admiration for Maestro Pugliese were expressed through the tribute he paid him with his tango Puglieseando, as well as his unique rendition of La yumba.

At the end of 1954, he left the orchestra and embarked on a new project. In 1953, while still associated with Pugliese's orchestra, he had been heard playing at a gathering by the Japanese singer Ranko Fujisawa, who was also the wife of the spouse of Shanpei Hayakawa, director of the Orquesta Típica Tokio, then visiting Argentina. Hayakawa invited him to travel to Japan to form an orchestra there. At that time, Caldara declined due to his commitment to Pugliese, but when Fujisawa returned for another visit, he accepted the offer and traveled to Japan with his entire family.

After a careful selection process, the orchestra was assembled and made its debut on Radio Tokyo. It later performed on the radio stations Nipon, Binca, and N.H.K., on the television channel J.O.R.K., and at the Kokusai and Nibiahai theaters. The orchestra also made some recordings, including the orchestral tangos Lorenzo by Agustín Bardi and Jueves by Udelino Toranzo and Rafael Rossi.

After a year, he returned to Argentina and formed his own ensemble, which was active between 1955 and 1960. Among its members were, among others, double bassist Norberto Samonta; bandoneonists Alberto Caracciolo, Elbio Garbuglia, Daniel Lomuto, Alfredo Marcucci, Carlos Niesi, Jacinto Nieves, Armando Rodríguez, and Ricardo Varela; pianist Rodolfo Mansilla; and violinists César Rilla, Juan Potenza, Norberto Bernasconi, Roberto Gallardo, Armando Cabrera, Alfio Messina, Eduardo Walczak, and Fernando Suárez Paz.

Initially, the vocalists were Raúl Ledesma and Carlos Montalvo. At the end of 1957, Ledesma was replaced by Horacio Dugan, who was later succeeded by Miguel Martino. The group debuted on Radio Splendid, beginning their performance with the tango El irresistible by Lorenzo Logatti. They recorded with Odeon featuring the voices of Ledesma and Montalvo, and the following year they began performing on Radio El Mundo.

Without stepping down from leading his orchestra, in 1960 he joined violinist Hugo Baralis, pianist Armando Cupo, and bassist Kicho Díaz to form the quartet Estrellas de Buenos Aires, which toured across the Americas, appeared on Peruvian television, and recorded several tracks for Odeon.

In the 1960s, he restructured his orchestra by teaming up with singers Ricardo Ruiz and Rodolfo Lesica. However, Ruiz left shortly afterward, though not before recording the tango Mi malacara y yo by Luis Stazo and Federico Silva—performed as a duet with Lesica—for the Music-Hall label. Lesica also recorded the tango Mis consejos by Héctor Marcó. The group was then renamed Caldara-Lesica and, under the same label, recorded the instrumental pieces Nochero soy, Mi bandoneón y yo, and La yumba, along with vocal tracks sung by Lesica: Confesión, Ríe payaso, and Por la vuelta.

Later on, he formed a new orchestra with bandoneonists Carlos Goliat, Miguel Incardona, Omar Nacir, and himself; double bassist Fernando Romano; pianist Rodolfo Mansilla; violinists Mario Abramovich, Antonio Agri, Carlos Arnaiz, Mario Grossi, Antonio Magnético, Félix Molino, and Fernando Suárez Paz; and cellist José Federighi.

In 1966, Roberto Echagüe replaced Lesica, and during the year he was with the group—before being succeeded by Raúl Funes—he recorded the tangos La novia ausente and Madame Ivonne.

In 1963, doctors diagnosed Caldara with Hodgkin's disease (cancer of the lymph nodes), and after a four-year battle, he died in Buenos Aires on 24 August 1967.
