= Angel D'Agostino =

Argentinian composer and pianist

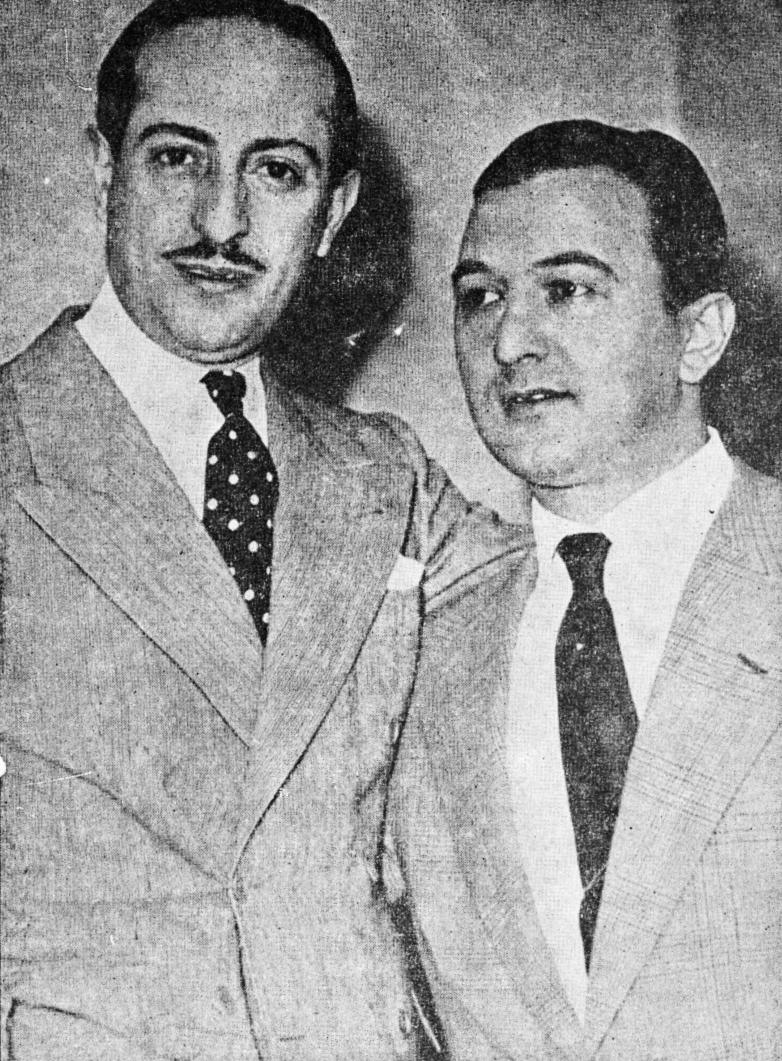

Angel Domingo Emilio D’Agostino (25 May 1900 in Buenos Aires - 16 January 1991) was a piano player, composer and bandleader (tango musical genre) in Argentina during the golden age of tango. He was a member of the duo Los Dos Angeles with Angel Vargas.

== Biography ==
Angel D'Agostino comes from a family of musicians. In 1920, he created his first band (which included the composer Agesilao Ferrazzano, Juan D’Arienzo, Anselmo Aieta and Ciriaco Ortiz) which mixed tango and jazz, and played live soundtracks for silent films in movie theaters.

Angel D'Agostino met Angel Vargas in 1932. They formed their band in 1940. They made Angel D'Agostino's famous recordings together, 93 of them, from 1940 to 1946.
