= Orquesta Típica Victor =

Argentine orchestra

The Orquesta Típica Victor, also known as Orquesta Típica Select, was an Argentine orchestra formed to record tango music for the record label RCA Victor. Its members varied, and its 444 or 445 recordings span from 1925 to 1944; it was called “the invisible orchestra” because, by contract, it was not allowed to perform in public.

== Origin ==
In the mid-1920s, the RCA Victor record label began competing with the Nacional-Odeon label and decided to form its own orchestra. To this end, they hired Adolfo Carabelli as their advisor and director. Carabelli was a pianist who had not previously ventured into the tango genre and had a solid background in classical music.

The initial lineup included bandoneon players Luis Petrucelli, Nicolás Primiani, and Ciriaco Ortiz, and violinists Manlio Francia and Agesilao Ferrazzano and Eugenio Romano, pianist Vicente Gorrese, and bassist Humberto Costanzo debuted on November 9, 1925, recording the tangos "Olvido" by Ángel D'Agostino and "Sarandí" by Juan Baüer.

Later, he decided to improve the quality of the recordings by recording at the company's headquarters in Camden, New Jersey, US, for which he hired Tito Roccatagliata, Osvaldo Fresedo, and Enrique Delfino for $5,000 each. In Camden, they were joined by two local artists: second violinist Alberto Infante Arancibia, an Argentinian who at that time directed the orchestra at the El Chico cabaret in New York and who appears briefly in two Gardel films, and cellist Alfred Lennartz, who was dedicated to classical music but adapted seamlessly to tango. Roccatagliata served as the orchestra's unofficial director and arranger, and they made 50 recordings plus four solos by Delfino and two by Fresedo. In some of the recordings, for example in the tangos "Don Esteban" and "Curupaytí" by Augusto Berto, Roccatagliata showcases his remarkable bow control in pizzicatos, which he frequently performed on the fourth string, a difficult technique with which he achieves true phrasing in the bass, a bandoneon definition well-suited to tango.

This orchestra was primarily dedicated to the tango genre, but it also recorded more than forty rancheras, as many waltzes, approximately fifteen foxtrots, and a few milongas, in addition to corridos, pasodobles, and polkas.

The quality of its musicians made the Orquesta Típica Victor "one of the richest musical expressions of its time, which would endure at the same level well into the 1930s."

== Musicians ==
Other musicians who were part of the orchestra were as follows:

Bandoneon players:

- Pedro Laurenz
- Carlos Marcucci
- Federico Scorticati
- Orlando Carabelli, brother of the director and

Double bass players:

- Nerón Ferrazzano

Violin players:

- Nicolás Di Masi
- Antonio Buglione
- Eduardo Armani
- Eugenio Nobile

Other musicians who played with the orchestra on occasion were Alfredo De Franco, Cayetano Puglisi and Aníbal Troilo.

== Vocalists ==
In the first three years, the orchestra recorded more than one hundred instrumental pieces, and it was not until October 8, 1928, that they recorded one with a singer, the tango "Piba", the first of four featuring the voice of violinist Antonio Buglione. Other singers who recorded with the orchestra were:

- Carlos Lafuente (37 times, the most recorded)
- Roberto Díaz (27)
- Alberto Gómez (25)
- Ernesto Famá (17)
- Luis Díaz (14)
- Teófilo Ibáñez (9)
- Ortega Del Cerro (7)
- Juan Carlos Delson (7)
- Mario Pomar – who at that time used the Mario Corrales' stage name — (6)
- Charlo (4).

Other vocalists who also participated in the recordings were: Samuel Aguayo, Mariano Balcarce, Armando Barbé (also known as Armando Sentous), Alberto Barros, Lito Bayardo, José Bohr, Alberto Carol, Deo Costa, Vicente Crisera, Dorita Davis, Fernando Díaz, Francisco Fiorentino, Gino Forsin, Hugo Gutiérrez, Lita Morales, Jaime Moreno, Osvaldo Moreno, Héctor Palacios, Jimmy People, El Príncipe Azul, Oscar Ugarte, Ángel Vargas, Augusto Vila, Eugenio Viñas, and Raúl Lavalle.

== Other orchestras ==
For commercial reasons, the record label created other orchestras: Orquesta Victor Popular, Orquesta Típica Los Provincianos, directed by Ciriaco Ortiz, Orquesta Radio Victor Argentina, directed by Mario Maurano, and Orquesta Argentina Victor, the Victor International Orchestra, the Victor Quartet, featuring violinists Cayetano Puglisi and Antonio Rossi, bandoneon player Ciriaco Ortiz, and pianist Francisco Pracánico, as well as the excellent Victor Trio, composed of violinist Elvino Vardaro and guitarists Oscar Alemán and Gastón Bueno Lobo.

== Directors ==
In 1936, bandoneon player Federico Scorticati replaced Carabelli as director of the orchestra, and his first recordings were the tangos "Cansancio" (by Federico Scorticati and Manuel Meaños) and "Amargura" (by Carlos Gardel and Alfredo Le Pera), with vocals by Héctor Palacios. In 1943, Mario Maurano took over as director, and his first recordings, from September 2nd, were the tangos "Nene caprichoso" and "Tranquilo viejo tranquilo", both by Francisco Canaro and Ivo Pelay, with vocals by Ortega Del Cerro.

On May 9, 1944, the waltzes "Uno que ha sido marino" by Ulloa Díaz and "Sobre las olas" by Juventino Rosas were recorded, both sung by the duo Jaime Moreno and Lito Bayardo, these were the last recordings under the name Orquesta Típica Victor.
