= Muchachos de la ciudad =

- Directed by: José A. Ferreyra
- Written by: José A. Ferreyra
- Release date: 1937
- Running time: 60 minute
- Country: Argentina
- Language: Spanish

Muchachos de la ciudad is a 1937 Argentine film directed and written by José A. Ferreyra during the Golden Age of Argentine cinema.

== Cast ==
- Carlos Dante
- Salvador Arcella - Lisandro (as S. Arcella)
- Antonio Ber Ciani - Malamuzza
- Floren Delbene - Julio Eduardo
- Herminia Franco
- Sara Olmos
