= Elvino Vardaro =

Argentine composer and violinist

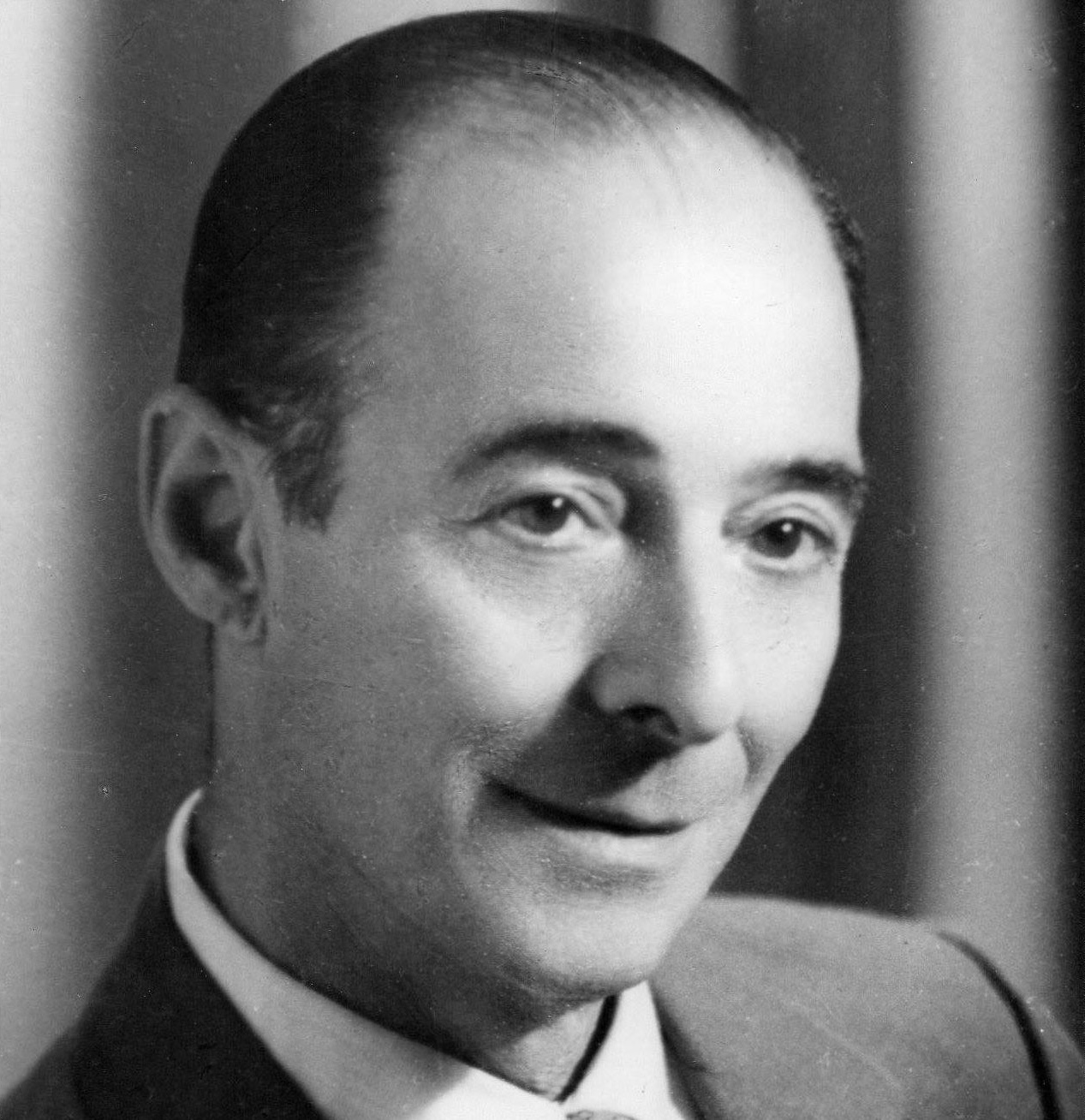
- Elvino Vardaro

Background information
- Born: 18 June 1905; Buenos Aires, Argentina
- Died: 5 August 1971 Córdoba, Argentina
- Genres: Tango
- Occupations: Violinist, orchestra director, composer
- Instrument: Violin

Elvino Vardaro (18 June 1905, Buenos Aires - 5 August 1971, Córdoba, Argentina) was an Argentine tango composer and violinist.

== Life ==
Vardaro grew up in the Abasto neighborhood of Buenos Aires and at the age of four he began studying the violin. At the age fourteen he made his concert debut with a violin recital of classical music and whilst playing violin to accompany silent films he met the pianists Rodolfo Biagi and Luis Visca who played with him.

In 1922 he joined the orquestra directed by Juan Maglio and later went on to play with the ensemble of the bandoneonist Paquito Bernardo. The following year he joined Roberto Firpo’s orchestra and played alongside the violinists Octavio Scaglione and Cayetano Puglisi with whom he would become close friends.

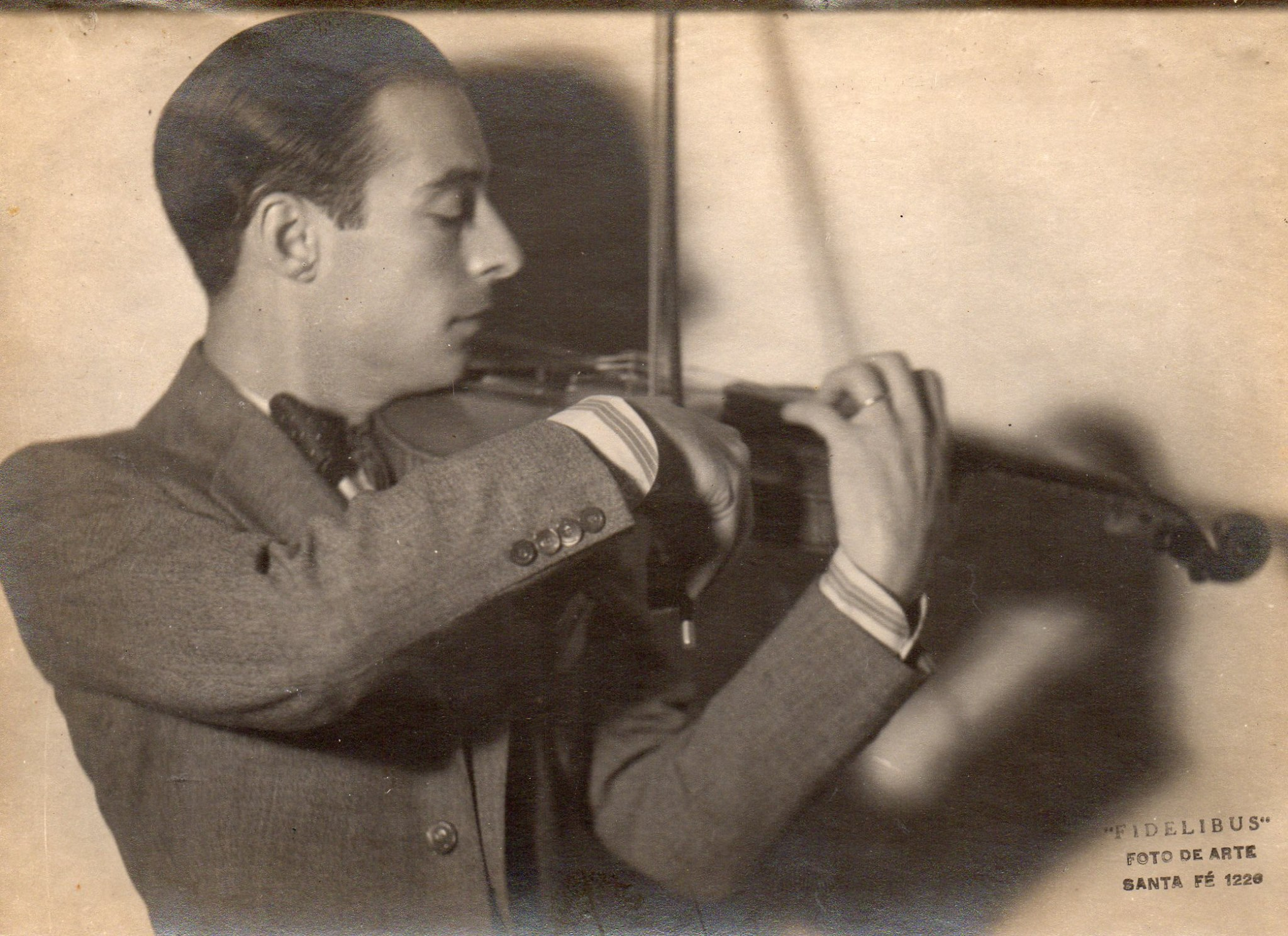

In 1926 the bandoneonist Pedro Maffia left the orchestra of Julio de Caro and formed his own ensemble with Osvaldo Pugliese on piano, Pedro Maffia and Alfredo De Franco on bandoneons, Elvino Vardaro and Emilio Puglisi on violins and Francisco De Lorenzo on double bass. That same year Vardaro composed his first tango, Grito del alma. In 1929 he joined with Osvaldo Pugliese in forming the Vardaro-Pugliese Sextet that played together until 1931. Two years later he organised a sextet with Aníbal Troilo and Jorge Argentino Fernández on bandoneons, Hugo Baralis and Vardaro on violins, Pedro Carracciolo on double bass and Jose Pascual on piano. In 1935 he introduced a third bandoneonist Eduardo Marino and in 1937 the singers Francisco Alfredo Marino, Carlos Lafuente, Guillermo Arbos and Nelly de la Vega joined the ensemble which performed in cafes, cabarets and on the radio in Buenos Aires and in Montevideo in Uruguay. In 1938 he played with Lucio Demare in an ensemble which included the singer Juan Carlos Miranda and two pianos.

After retiring to live in Cordoba he reappeared in 1941 to conduct the jazz orchestra Brighton Jazz, which performed on Radio El Mundo and in cafes and cabarets and recorded two works, one of which, Violinomania, was written by Argentino Galván and dedicated to Vardaro in tribute to his virtuosity.

For several years he played in the orchestra of Joaquin Do Reyes and was heard on Radio El Mundo and during the 1940s and 1950s he appeared with the orchestras of Adolfo Perez, Osvaldo Fresedo and Fulvio Salamanca.

In 1955 he joined Ástor Piazzolla’s Orquesta de Cuerdos and in 1961 moved to Piazzolla’s first Quinteto. During this same period he was also performing with the orchestra of Carlos di Sarli.

In the last years of his life he moved to Arguello, near the city of Cordoba, where he played in the provincial symphony orchestra until his death on 5 August 1971.

== Compositions ==
- Grito del alma or Tinieblas (lyrics by Juan Velich)
- Dominio (lyrics by Luis Rubistein)
- Imaginación (a waltz written in collaboration with Oscar Arona, lyrics by Francisco García Jiménez)
- Amalia (polka)
- Mía (written in collaboration with Oscar Arona, lyrics by Celedonio Flores)
- Te llama mi violín (lyrics by Cátulo Castillo)
- Un beso
- Y a mí qué me importa (written in collaboration with Eduardo Moreno)
- El repique
- Miedo (written in collaboration with Oscar Arona, lyrics by Francisco García Jiménez)
- Fray milonga (lyrics by Francisco García Jiménez)

== Filmography ==
- Paths of Faith (1938)
- El último encuentro (1938)
- Así es el tango (1937)
