= Francisco Lauro =

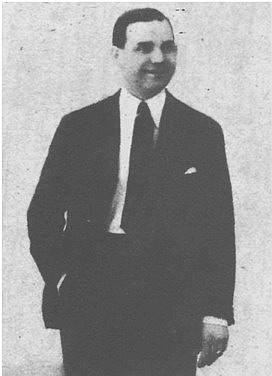
- Francisco Lauro

Background information
- Also known as: El Tano, Pancho Picaflor
- Born: 17 May 1897; Mola di Bari, Italy
- Died: 12 August 1960 (aged 63)
- Genres: Tango
- Occupation(s): Composer, orchestra conductor
- Years active: First half of the 20th century
- Labels: RCA Victor

Francisco Lauro (17 May 1897 – 12 August 1960) was a bandoneonist, composer, and orchestra conductor who carried out his artistic activity in Argentina.

== Professional career ==
Lauro was born in Mola, an Italian town in the province of Bari, in the Puglia region.

Around 1938, he became popularly known because, together with pianist Bernardo Blas and bandoneon player Juan Sánchez Gorio, he formed an orchestra under his direction that, since they performed at a venue called “Un rincón de Mendoza,” took the name Los Mendocinos. In addition to its original musicians, the group also included Jorge Caldara, Alfredo De Angelis, Eduardo Del Piano, and vocalists Alberto Ortiz, Luis Mendoza, and Argentino Oliver, among others.

Simple, with a repertoire of tangos, milongas, and well-known waltzes and a very danceable rhythm, around the same time they performed at Café Germinal and made their debut on LR3 Radio Belgrano. When De Angelis left to form his own orchestra, taking all the members of the group with him, he initially called them Los ex Mendocinos under the direction of Alfredo De Angelis. Later, when Blas formed his own group, he named it Los Auténticos Mendocinos. In the end, however, it was Lauro who ultimately kept the name with his sextet Los Mendocinos.

There was a role known as the músico figurante—someone who appeared on stage pretending to play an instrument, even though they either didn’t know how to play or knew very little. The purpose of the figurante could be to give the audience the impression that there were more performers than there actually were. In other cases, it was the director pretending to conduct the group while playing an instrument that he possibly knew how to play, but not well enough to match the skill level of the others.

The latter was the case with Lauro, who pretended to play a bandoneon that, lacking the sound box, couldn’t produce any sound. This allowed his musicians to play a prank on him: one day, while the orchestra was playing at full swing, they suddenly went silent, leaving Lauro alone in his pantomime.

Astor Piazzolla, after making a brief debut as an orchestra musician with Gabriel Clausi in a single performance, joined Francisco Lauro’s orchestra, which had a lot of work and offered the opportunity to earn more.

He went on to record around twenty tracks for the RCA Víctor label between 1947 and 1952. Although he had his moment of fame due to his music, it was also supported—and even overshadowed—by his personality, to the point where the anecdotes about him were more well-known than the pieces he composed. He was well-loved by his colleagues, had a great sense of humor, and was a maker and teller of jokes, even ones that poked fun at his own mistakes and his complicated way of speaking.

As a composer, he is remembered for his waltzes Corazón ingrato, Madre no llores, Tú eres mi vida, and Una canción a Santiago del Estero; the milongas Beso gaucho and Milonga brava; the pasodobles Corazón gitano and Gloria de Sevilla; the tangos Lo que no se olvida, Perfidia, and Qué performance; and the ranchera Hay baile en lo de Doña Juana.

He died on 12 August 1960.
