= Canaro =

Canaro may refer to:

== Places ==
- Canaro, Rovigo, Veneto, Italy

== People ==
- Francisco Canaro (1888–1964), Uruguayan violinist and tango orchestra leader
- Mario Canaro (1903–1974), Uruguayan tango musician, a brother of Francisco Canaro
- Er Canaro (born 1956), Italian torturer-murderer, dog coiffeur and cocaine addict
