= Rafael Tuegols =

Argentine musician

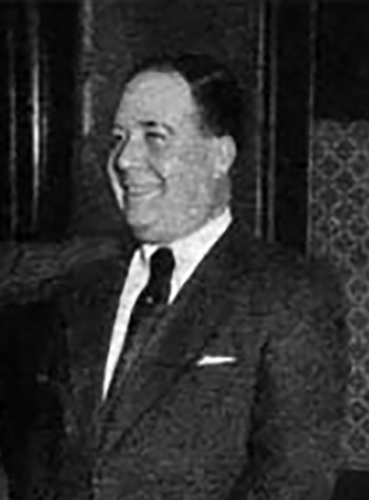
- Rafael Tuegols

Background information
- Born: Rafael Eulogio Tuegols; 11 March 1889; Buenos Aires, Argentina
- Origin: Argentina
- Died: 23 April 1960 (aged 71) Buenos Aires, Argentina
- Genres: Tango
- Occupation(s): Composer, guitarist, violinist
- Instrument: Violin

Rafael Eulogio Tuegols (11 March 1889 – 23 April 1960) was an Argentine musician who worked in the tango genre as a guitarist, violinist, and composer.

== Professional career ==
Initially, he was a guitar player and later switched to the violin. After working in zarzuela orchestras in various theaters, he dedicated himself to tango music starting around 1911, when, by chance, he performed that music in Eduardo Arolas’s trio at the café "La Buseca" in the city of Avellaneda.

Around 1913, he joined the quartet of Antonio Gutman, who used the name Antonio Guzmán and was nicknamed "Ruso Antonio," with whom he worked in a café in the Boedo neighborhood. Later, he was with Luis Riccardi at the cabaret "Montmartre," and afterwards, he joined Riccardi and Luis Bernstein ("Don Goyo") in the group with which Arolas played at the "Tabarín" on Suipacha Street. Arolas went to Europe, and from then on Rafael Tuegols passed through several typical orchestras, including those of Francisco Canaro, Humberto Canaro, and Anselmo Aieta, and he even had his own orchestra.

He worked playing tango with his violin in various venues: in Buenos Aires, among others, "Maipú Pigalls," "La Paloma," "La Morocha," "Botafogo," "C.T.V.," "Bar Iglesias," and in Montevideo, the bar "Victoria" and the "Solís" theater in Montevideo.

Although he had been composing since 1914, it was in 1917 that he gained recognition with the publication of Ave negra, followed by many others: Allanamiento, La Atropellada, Barrio Piñeyro, La Chica del volante, Muchacho de ley, Pa' que bronqués, Rosina, Si pudiera regresar, Tratála con cariño, La Uruguayita, Viejos pagos, among others.

Carlos Gardel recorded his tangos Beso ingrato, La gayola (1927), Lo que fuiste, Midinette porteña, Príncipe, Zorro gris, and the waltz Yo te imploro.

Tuegols died in Buenos Aires on April 23, 1960.

== Works ==
- "A mi juego me llamaron" (1942)
- "El anciano"
- "Ayer soñé" (1947) with Santiago Adamini
- "Beso ingrato" (1959) with Carlos Camba
- "Compañera gaucha"
- "Decreto" (1940) with Roberto Roncayoli
- "La gatita" (1940) with Francisco García Jiménez
- "La gayola" (1927) with Armando Tagini
- "Lo que fuiste" (1940) with Francisco García Jiménez
- "Midinette porteña" (1959) with Carlos Camba
- "Milonga del mozo guapo"
- "Muchacho de ley" (1939) with Armando Tagini
- "Príncipe" (1973) with Anselmo Aieta
- "Se acabaron los guapos" (1951) with Alfredo Tropiani
- "La serranita"
- "Servite un amargo" (1942) with Juan Carlos Marambio Catán
- "El trovero" (1940) with Agustín Irusta
- "Zorro gris" (1920) with Francisco García Jiménez
