= Humberto Canaro =

Uruguayan pianist (1896–1952)

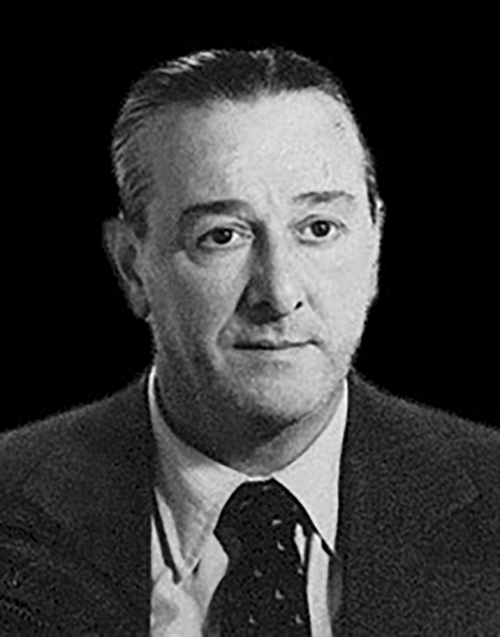
- Humberto Canaro

Background information
- Also known as: Humberto Canaro
- Born: José Canaro; 16 August 1896; San José de Mayo, Uruguay
- Origin: Uruguay
- Died: 26 August 1952 (aged 56) Buenos Aires, Argentina
- Genres: Tango
- Occupations: Pianist, orchestra conductor, composer
- Instrument: Piano
- Years active: 1910s–1952

Humberto Canaro, né José Canaro (16 August 1896 – 26 August 1952) was a Uruguayan pianist, orchestra conductor and composer active in the Argentine tango scene.

== Early life ==
José "Humberto" Canaro was born on 16 August 1896 in San José de Mayo, Uruguay. He was one of the younger brothers of the prominent Canaro family of musicians. His brother Francisco encouraged his musical studies and provided him with a piano, which enabled him to begin a professional career in music.

== Career ==
Canaro moved with his family to Buenos Aires as a child, where he developed his career as a tango musician. He performed as the pianist in his brother Francisco's orchestra as well as in his own ensemble, which included violinist Rafael Tuegols.

In 1918, Canaro accompanied Manuel Pizarro on a tour of Córdoba, playing piano alongside violinists such as Rovati and Pizella; during this tour he performed at Café Las Delicias, where he met violinist Ciriaco Ortiz.

In 1920, he led a substitute orchestra for his brother Francisco, appearing at cabarets such as Maipú, Pigall, and Dancing Florida. Musicians in this lineup included Rafael Tuegols (violin) and Carmelo Mutarelli (vocals and double bass). The following year he directed a similar ensemble at Casino Pigall featuring José Schumacher, Anselmo Aieta and Ángel Danesi.

In 1922, Canaro joined his brother Juan's first orchestra as pianist alongside Juan Canaro and Roque Biafore on bandoneons, Rafael Tuegols and Antonio Buglione on violins, and Rodolfo Duclós on double bass.

After the Second World War, he toured Europe and the Americas with his orquesta típica, returning to Buenos Aires in 1951.

Canaro maintained a close friendship with Carlos Gardel, who recorded his best-known tango "Gloria" at the singer's request.

In 1935, Canaro directed his own orchestra on Radio Splendid and the Porteña and Cultura radio stations, often featuring chansonnier Pedro Arrieta. In the early 1940s, singer Edmundo Rivero joined the orchestra.

== Death ==
Canaro died in Buenos Aires, Argentina on 26 August 1952.

== Compositions ==
Although he did not achieve the same level of acclaim as some of his siblings, Canaro composed several works that were well received by the public. His rancheras include "La chiruza" and "Amaneciendo"; among his tangos and other pieces are:

- "Alfredo"
- "Gloria" (lyrics by Armando Tagini)
- "Con ventaja"
- "El silbato"
- "Santo remedio"
- "¡No ensartamos ni una!"
- "Viejo lindo"
- "Nuevas esperanzas"
- "Palo verde"
- "Changüí"
- "Un tesoro"
- "Fiebre"
- "Novia mía"
- "Historia sentimental"
- "Tortura"
