= Buenos Aires, Summer 1912 =

Buenos Aires, verano 1912
- Directed by: Oscar Kantor
- Written by: Oscar Kantor; Pablo Palant
- Produced by: Oscar Kantor
- Starring: Augusto Bonardo; Ubaldo Martínez; Beto Gianola; Edmundo Rivero
- Cinematography: Ignacio Souto
- Edited by: Alberto Borello; Mario Cosentino
- Release date: 1966
- Running time: 78 minutes
- Country: Argentina
- Language: Spanish

Buenos Aires, verano 1912 (English language: Buenos Aires, Summer 1912) is a 1966 Argentine black-and-white drama film comedy directed and written by Oscar Kantor with Pablo Palant. The film premiered on 1966 in Buenos Aires.

== Cast ==
- Augusto Bonardo
- Ubaldo Martínez
- Beto Gianola
- Christina Banegas
- Edmundo Rivero
- Augusto Fernández
- Marta Gam
- Nelly Tesolín
- Beatriz Matar
- Alberto Fernández de Rosa
- Agustín Alezzo
- Víctor Proncet
- Ignacio Finder
- Jorge Amosa
- Rodolfo Maertens
- Ricardo Morán
- Héctor Fuentes
- María Armand
- Chiry Rodríguez
- Cacho Espíndola
- Héctor Tealdi
