= Los Locos del cuarto piso =

- Directed by: Lisandro de la Tea
- Written by: Manuel Collazo
- Produced by: Lisandro de la Tea
- Starring: Anselmo Aieta; Óscar Alonso; Francisco Álvarez
- Music by: Anselmo Aieta
- Release date: 10 November 1937
- Running time: 76 minutes
- Country: Argentina
- Language: Spanish

Los Locos del cuarto piso ("The Crazies on the Fourth Floor") is a black and white 1937 Argentine comedy film directed by Lisandro de la Tea and written by Manuel Collazo, based on the play by Francisco E. Collazo. The film premiered on November 10, 1937 in Buenos Aires, during the Golden Age of Argentine cinema.

== Cast ==
- Anselmo Aieta
- Óscar Alonso
- Francisco Álvarez
- Enrique Arellano
- Héctor Coire
- María Esther Gamas
- Pedro Laxalt
- Lopecito
- Perla Mary
- José Mazilli
- Félix Mutarelli
- Ilde Pirovano
- Benita Puértolas
- Juan Sarcione
- Oscar Villa
