= Rafael Canaro =

Uruguayan musician (1890–1972)

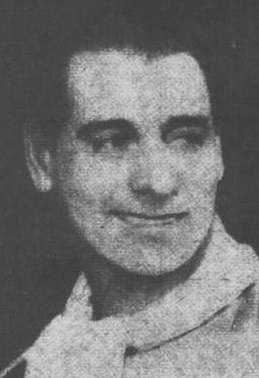
- Rafael Canaro

Background information
- Also known as: Rafael Canaro
- Born: Rafael Canarozzo; 22 June 1890; San José de Mayo, Uruguay
- Origin: Uruguay
- Died: 28 January 1972 (aged 81) Mar del Plata, Argentina
- Genres: Tango
- Occupations: Musician, orchestra conductor, composer
- Instruments: Bandoneon, musical saw
- Years active: 1925–1972
- Label: Odeón

Rafael Canarozzo, better known as Rafael Canaro (22 June 1890 – 28 January 1972), was an Uruguayan musician, orchestra conductor, and composer who became a naturalized citizen of Argentina.

He was the younger brother of fellow conductor Francisco Canaro (1888–1964).

== Professional career ==
The son of an Italian couple—Don Francisco Canaro (father), a gravedigger by profession, and Doña Rafaela Gatto—Canaro's family settled in Buenos Aires in 1897 when he was very young. They lived in tenement houses (known as conventillos) under conditions of extreme poverty.

Rafael Canaro was raised in a family of artists connected to the tango genre. Among them were his other brother, the singer Juan Canaro, and the pianist and composer Humberto Canaro.

In 1905, while Francisco Canaro had taken up the violin, Rafael was working as a guitarist accompanying payadores (improvisational folk singers).

He began his musical career in his brother Francisco’s orchestra in 1925, touring in Paris, specifically as a double bassist and saw player. The group also included Fioravanti De Cicco (piano), Romualdo Lomoro (drums), and Teresita Asprella (vocals and guitar).

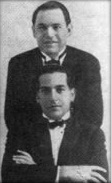
Francisco Canaro (in the background) and Rafael Canaro on tour during the 1920s.

In 1926, he traveled to New York with the same company, and after that tour, he returned to France, where he led his own orchestra until 1939. Due to the war, he returned to Buenos Aires after touring all of Europe—with both local and European musicians who had embraced tango—as well as the Middle East.

In Europe, his orchestra featured Spanish vocalists such as Carmen Sevilla and Luis Mariano. Among the famous venues in the City of Light (Paris) where he performed were Ambassadeurs, Florida, Ermitage, and Claridge. He also recorded records with France’s Odeon label.

In May 1929, he debuted at the Empire Theater in Paris, with singer Carlos Dante as the main chorus vocalist. In Nice, he had the opportunity to perform in a program alongside Carlos Gardel, and then traveled to Germany and Spain. In Spain, his orchestra made recordings for Regal (a subsidiary of Columbia).

He composed, together with his brother Francisco and with lyrics by Juan Andrés Caruso, the tango Sentimiento gaucho, a piece that became very popular and remained relevant for several decades. For this, it was awarded first prize in the first tango competition held by the "Nacional" record label at the end of 1924.

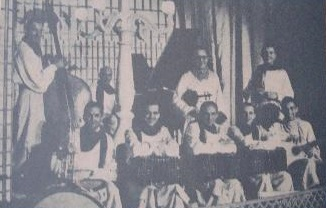
Orquesta Típica of Rafael Canaro.

In 1941, he worked with the duo José Tinelli-Chola Bosch; they shared a successful program on LR6 Radio Mitre, along with the popular singer Adhelma Falcón.

Figures such as vocalists Aldo Campoamor, Héctor María Artola, Mario Beltrán, Ricardo Duarte, Raúl Sanders, Luis Scalon, Alberto Tagle, Luis Mariano, and Jorge Cardoso passed through his orchestra. The prestigious musician Lucio Demare was also part of his orquesta típica.

== Songs performed by his orchestra ==
- Pizpireta.
- Lejanía.
- La Batuta.
- La Palmera.
- Tango de Media Noche.
- Ciertos Amores.
- El tortazo.
- Garua.
- Viejo gaucho (1938).
- La muchacha del centro.
- Rien que nous deux (Solo los dos) (1932).
- La melodie de notre adieu (La melodía de nuestro adiós).
- Campanas del recuerdo
- El que a hierro mata
- Victoria
- Naipe marcado] (1934)
- La pulpera de Santa Lucía]
- Entre sueños
- Estampilla
- Garufa
- Paciencia
- Malevaje
- Torturas
- Haragán
- Alma en pena
- Caminito
- Zaraza
- A Montmatre
- Las vueltas de la vida
- Alma de bandoneón
- Yo no se porque te quiero
- Como te quiero.
- Pura milonga (Instrumental)
- Viejos Tiempos
- Que le importa al mundo (1936)
- Falsedad
- Olvidame (1937)
- Yo también soñé
- Cuando el corazón (1938).
- Tana linda.
- Llevatelo todo.
- Callecita de mi novia.
