= Edmundo Rivero =

Edmundo Rivero Leonel Edmundo Rivero
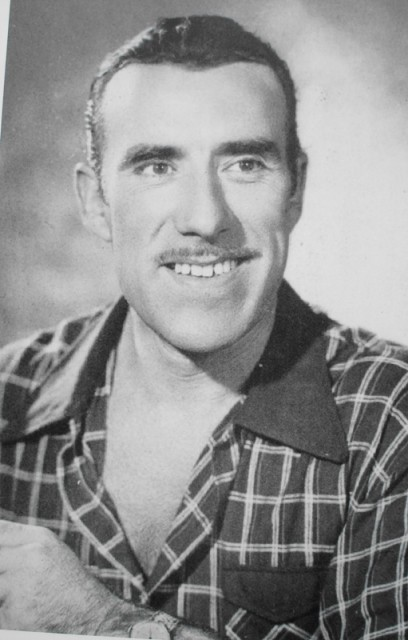
- Rivero in the 1960s.

Background information
- Also known as: El Feo (The Ugly)
- Born: June 8, 1911; Valentín Alsina, Buenos Aires, Argentina
- Died: January 18, 1986 (aged 74)
- Genres: Tango
- Occupation: Singer
- Instrument(s): Vocals, guitar

Leonel Edmundo Rivero (June 8, 1911 – January 18, 1986) was an Argentine tango singer, composer, and impresario.

== Biography ==
=== Early days ===
Rivero was born in the southern Buenos Aires suburb of Valentín Alsina. Joining his father in some of his travels, he was exposed to the lifestyle and the music of the gauchos of Buenos Aires Province from his early days. His maternal great-grandfather, named Lionel, was a British immigrant, and fought against the Pampas tribes in the mid-19th century, being wounded by a spear. From him, Rivero inherited his blond hair and his first name.

In his teens, Rivero's family moved to the Belgrano neighborhood, in the days where tango developed as a dancing phenomenon, but also as an ever more complex music form under the "ABC" of composers/directors Arolas, Bardi, and Cobián. At the same time, the themes of tango lyrics evolved from light-hearted ribaldry into more complex stories delving on love and manly honor.

Rivero learned classic guitar and also trained as a singer; he had a deep bass-baritone voice that was one of his trademarks, together with his huge hands (due to his acromegaly) that made him the butt of many jokes.

=== Singing career ===
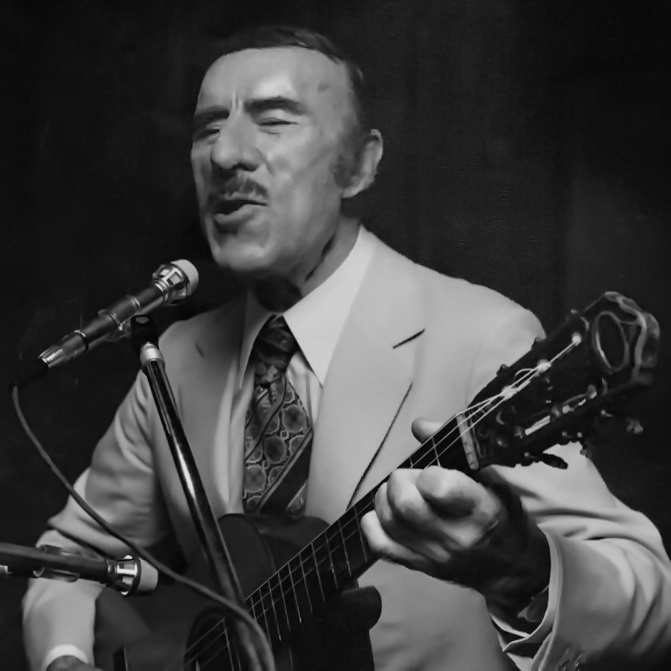
Edmundo Rivero performing.

After working as a cover singer in small venues, Rivero got his first radio appearance singing a duet with his sister Eva in Radio Cultura. He spent the early 1930s alternating radio work with dance hall gigs.

After singing for bandleader José De Caro in 1935, Rivero's qualities attracted José's more famous brother Julio De Caro, who drafted Rivero into his orchestra, which incorporated non-traditional instruments and was a fixture of the Pueyrredón theatre ballroom in Flores. Rivero gained some fame, and the moniker that stayed with him forever: el feo (the ugly guy).

Even though Rivero was featured in many Argentine films in the 1930s and 1940s, the early forties were a time of uncertainty for him. Even bandleaders who did hire him (such as Humberto Canaro) would not retain him for long. Later, Rivero would claim that his deep voice was a severe handicap during this time.

In 1944, Rivero joined Horacio Salgán. His three-year tenure there left no recordings (with his Bartók influences, Salgán was too "far out" for the general tango audience) but earned Rivero the respect of avant-garde and jazz musicians. To make ends meet, Rivero also worked in a duo with fellow singer Carlos Bermúdez that recorded tangos in a more commercial vein for the Colombian market.

In 1947, Rivero was hired by Aníbal Troilo, who was having a stellar run of recordings with new hit songs, many of them in collaboration with lyricist Homero Manzi. During his three years with Troilo, Rivero shared the limelight with Floreal Ruiz and Aldo Calderón, and recorded 22 songs, including the mega-hit Sur, where Troilo's melody frames Manzi's elegy for a young love and also for the old barrio.

Having found fame and fortune, Rivero left Troilo in 1950 and started a solo career. For accompaniment, he would alternate between guitar quartets and a full orchestral format for the remainder of his career. The most famous musician to follow Rivero was guitarist Roberto Grela, who was also the guitarist of Troilo's quartet.

Guitar-only formations were used by countryside milonga artists, early tango singers, and even Carlos Gardel in his youth, but Rivero's 1950s recordings, during a period of total dominance by big orchestras, was a bold statement, which forever cemented his identification with the silent masculinity of the countryside, as opposed to the emphasis that "urban" tango put on stories of lost love.

In the sixties, Salgán and Rivero had their revenge, and recorded several tunes together. Rivero also collaborated with other artists, who noted his generosity and his devotion to music. In 1966 he appeared in the film Buenos Aires, verano 1912.

=== El Viejo Almacén ===
By the late 1960s, tango had become mostly "for export", since musicians and audiences were aging and making little progress from the orchestral format of the 1940s and 1950s. many tango fans rejected the music of Ástor Piazzolla and his followers, but Rivero himself admired Piazzolla, and recorded his creations on more than one occasion. Even major artists had trouble finding venues to play.

Fearing for tango's viability, in 1969 Rivero opened El Viejo Almacén ("The old store"), a tango club in the San Telmo district. His hospitality was enjoyed by many visitors to Buenos Aires, who went to Rivero's club to savor the tango music and dance in its full intensity. Among the recurring visitors were Joan Manuel Serrat and Camilo José Cela.

Rivero's place was a venue for tango, where musicians knew they would be respected and paid on time. Famed tango lyricist Horacio Ferrer wrote a milonga about the almacén for which Rivero later composed the music, and took to calling Rivero by his forgotten first name, Leonel, a gesture that many friends would imitate.

Rivero was an icon in Japanese tango circles. He toured Japan in 1968, and got to know many Japanese musicians and dancers. Rivero composed "Arigato Japón" and "A lo Megata" (honoring Tsunayoshi "Tsunami" Megata, one of the top tango dancers of his age). Japanese tourists were a constant presence in Rivero's place.

Rivero hosted a TV show in the early seventies, which featured artists from the club (such as Beba Bidart), as well as lively dialog sprinkled with lunfardo. Some of his 1960s and 1970s reunions with Troilo and Grela were televised. In 1980, Rivero took part in Osvaldo Pugliese's 75th birthday concert. In his later years, he delegated the day-to-day operation of the club to his son Edmundo ("Muni").

Rivero was hospitalized in late 1985, and died from heart failure on January 18, 1986, in Buenos Aires.

In February 2011, it was reported that many artifacts germane to Rivero's legacy were stolen from a warehouse in Ramos Mejía.

== Selected recordings ==
- Sur (perhaps the most popular tango in Argentina)
- El ciruja (an underworld saga sprinkled with heavy doses of lunfardo)
- Amablemente (a sonnet sung as a milonga—the lyrics lead to a dramatic ending)
- Pucherito de gallina
- No te engañes corazón
- Malón de ausencia
- Yo te bendigo
- Falsía
- El último organito
