= El cantor del pueblo =

- Directed by: Antonio Ber Ciani
- Written by: Carlos Goicochea; Rogelio Cordone
- Produced by: Cosmos
- Starring: Roberto Quiroga; Tito Lusiardo; Mario Fortuna; Perla Mux; Herminia Franco
- Cinematography: Gumer Barreiros
- Music by: Domingo Federico
- Release date: 23 January 1948
- Running time: 78 minutes
- Country: Argentina
- Language: Spanish

El cantor del pueblo (English: The town's singer) is a 1948 Argentine musical film of the classical era of Argentine cinema, directed by Antonio Ber Ciani and written by Carlos Goicoechea and Rogelio cordone. It was premiered on January 23, 1948.

The film is about a trio of tango singers that are dreaming to be famous.

== Cast ==
- Roberto Quiroga
- Tito Lusiardo
- Mario Fortuna
- Perla Mux
- Herminia Franco
- César Fiaschi
- María Esther Podestá
- Mabel Dorán
- Oscar Soldati
- Lilian Valmar
- Narciso Ibáñez
- Hernani Stinga
- María Esther Buschiazzo
- Domingo Mania
- Juan D'Arienzo
- Alfredo de Angelis
- Roberto Firpo
- Domingo Federico
