= Cayetano Puglisi =

Argentine violinist, composer and orchestra conductor

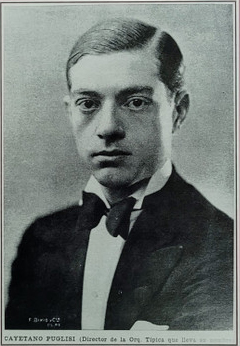
- Cayetano Puglisi

Background information
- Born: January 2, 1902 Messina, Italy
- Died: November 2, 1968 (aged 66) Buenos Aires, Argentina
- Occupation: Violinist

Cayetano Puglisi (2 January 1902 – 2 November 1968) was an Argentine violinist, composer, and orchestra conductor of Italian origin.

== Life ==
He was born in Messina, Sicily, Italy, into a family of musicians. At the age of 7, he moved with his family to Buenos Aires, where he began his violin studies with Maestro Pessina. His inclination toward classical music led him to perform a concert at the Teatro Nuevo, which earned him a scholarship from the newspaper La Prensa to further his studies in Europe. However, due to the outbreak of World War I in 1914, he was unable to make the trip.

In his teenage years, Puglisi began playing in cafés and bars in the La Boca neighborhood. He formed a trio with Carlos Marcucci (bandoneon) and Pedro Almirón (piano), known as the "Trío de los Pibes," which performed at the Iglesias bar on Corrientes Street. At the age of 14, he was discovered by orchestra conductor Roberto Firpo, who brought him into his ensemble as second violinist in 1916.

In addition to his collaboration with Firpo, he was a member of the orchestras of Francisco Canaro, Enrique Delfino, and Pedro Maffia. In 1928, he formed his own sextet, with which he recorded for the Victor label.

In 1940, after the dissolution of his orchestra, Puglisi joined Juan D'Arienzo's orchestra, where he served as first violinist. His unique style and refined technique brought a distinctive sound to the ensemble, securing his place in the history of tango.

Cayetano Puglisi died on November 2, 1968, in Buenos Aires.
