= Antonio Ber Ciani =

Argentine actor and film director

- Born: August 22, 1907; Santa Fe, Argentina
- Died: June 24, 2001 (aged 93); Buenos Aires, Argentina
- Occupations: Actor, film director

Antonio Ber Ciani (22 August 1907 in Santa Fe — 24 June 2001 in Buenos Aires) was an Argentine actor and film director notable for his work during the classical era of Argentine cinema. He is known for films such as Don Bildigerno de Pago Milagro.

== Filmography ==
=== As director ===
- Donde comienzan los pantanos (1952)
- Martín Pescador (1951)
- Otra cosa es con guitarra (1949)
- Don Bildigerno de Pago Milagro (1948)
- El cantor del pueblo (1948)
- Lauracha (1946)
- La novia de los forasteros (1942)
- De la sierra al valle (1938)
- El forastero (1937)
- Hasta la vuelta (1936)

=== As writer ===
- La novia de los forasteros (1942)
- De la sierra al valle (1938)

=== As direction assistant ===
- Ayúdame a vivir (1936)
- Besos brujos (1937)
- Muchachos de la ciudad (1937)

=== As actor ===
- El hombre del subsuelo (1981)
- Fortín Alto (1941)
- Caprichosa y millonaria (1940)
- Muchachos de la ciudad (1937)
- La barra mendocina (1935)
- Muñequitas porteñas (1931)
- El cantar de mi ciudad (1930)
- Destinos (1929)
- Las aventuras de Pancho Talero (1929)
