= Osvaldo Requena =

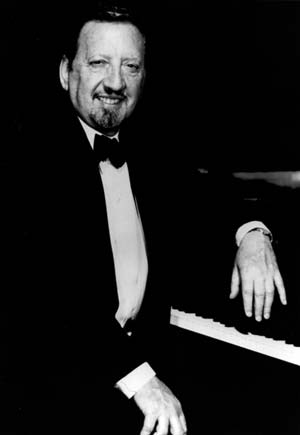
- Osvaldo Requena

Background information
- Born: Osvaldo Francisco Requena; June 29, 1931; Buenos Aires, Argentina
- Died: March 25, 2010 (aged 78) Buenos Aires, Argentina
- Genres: Tango
- Occupations: Pianist, arranger, composer
- Instrument: Piano

Osvaldo Francisco Requena (29 June 1931 – 25 March 2010) was an Argentine tango pianist, arranger, and composer.

== Professional career ==
Requena was an arranger and pianist of contemporary tango, as well as an orchestra conductor, including accompaniments for various singers. He recorded more than 400 records, and as a pianist, around 800 works.

An admirer of Eduardo Arolas, Agustín Bardi, Alfredo Gobbi, and Francisco Canaro, he made his first arrangement for Raúl Kaplún's orchestra in 1951.

Over the years, he worked with musicians such as Leopoldo Federico, Florindo Sassone, Astor Piazzolla, and Zubin Mehta.

In 1968, he was appointed director of the "Microfón" label, where he worked for fourteen years.

There, he conducted the orchestra that accompanied folk artists such as Alfredo Zitarrosa and Los Quilla Huasi, among others. During the 1970s, he was the director of the resident orchestra of Channel 11 in Buenos Aires, where he accompanied artists from all genres.

He left about one hundred unpublished composed works and had accumulated a large archive of tango arrangements from all eras, with more than eight thousand scores.

He was invited by film director Leopoldo Torre Nilsson to compose the soundtrack for The Seven Madmen, where he included original works of his own such as La milonga del rufián melancólico (The Milonga of the Melancholic Ruffian), El vals del encuentro (The Waltz of the Encounter), and Tango del desorden (Tango of Disorder).

Around 1984, he began conducting the National Orchestra "Juan de Dios Filiberto," with which he performed at the Teatro Cervantes in Buenos Aires.

The following year, he founded a trio to perform his arrangements. It was an old project he had conceived in the 1960s, when he played alongside Hermes Peresini on violin, Enrique Marchetto on double bass, and the singer Floreal Ruiz.

In the same way, together with the show called Tango Sessions, Requena carried out numerous tours across the United States, Europe, and the Asian continent.

During his final years, he was one of the conductors of the Café de los Maestros orchestra, a group made up of prominent figures of the genre and promoted by musician Gustavo Santaolalla.

He died in Buenos Aires on March 25, 2010, at the age of 78.
