= Lorenzo Logatti =

Italian Argentine clarinetist and composer

- Born: November 7, 1872; Foggia, Italy
- Died: March 19, 1961 (aged 88); Buenos Aires, Argentina
- Occupations: Clarinetist and composer

Lorenzo Logatti (7 November 1872 – 19 March 1961) was an Italian Argentine clarinetist and composer.

== Professional career ==
He received his first musical training from his father, who was a professional musician, and later completed his studies with other teachers. He performed in various ensembles both in his home province and in Naples, and even conducted a band in Ancona.

In November 1898, he traveled to Argentina. Upon arrival, he joined the Association of Orchestral Professors, one of whose activities was to help its members find employment. He also began frequenting the Sabatino café, located on Paraná Street between Sarmiento and Avenida Corrientes, where he mingled with other musicians and became acquainted with the new country. He soon found work in the large lyrical and classical orchestras that performed at the Teatro Ópera on the aforementioned avenue. At that time, during the early stage of tango, the clarinet was a common instrument in popular ensembles dedicated to the genre—Juan Carlos Bazán being a notable example of a clarinetist—but few classically trained musicians ventured into tango. Logatti and Alberico Stápola—another Italian from the lyrical ensembles—were among the few who did, taking advantage of the lyrical groups’ summer break to work in popular ensembles during Carnival dances.

He joined the orchestra of the Teatro Colón, which inaugurated the theater in 1908, conducted by Luigi Mancinelli—an Italian conductor and composer considered the most important Italian opera conductor of the late 19th century until the emergence of Arturo Toscanini.

At the 1908 Carnival dances at the Teatro Ópera, he performed in the orchestra that entertained the gatherings by playing, as was customary at the time, all kinds of rhythms. At one of these events, Logatti—who had already composed a couple of tangos—premiered his most widely known work, the tango El irresistible. That year marked the last time he played in a popular orchestra for a dance at a recreational venue, as his subsequent work was with light music ensembles and the orchestra of the city of Buenos Aires.

Other tangos he composed include El cabrero, ¿Cómo le va?, El Florida, El galán, Poetisa, Susceptible, Sugestivo, and Te quiero mucho.

Lorenzo Logatti died in Buenos Aires on March 19, 1961.
