= Francisco Rotundo =

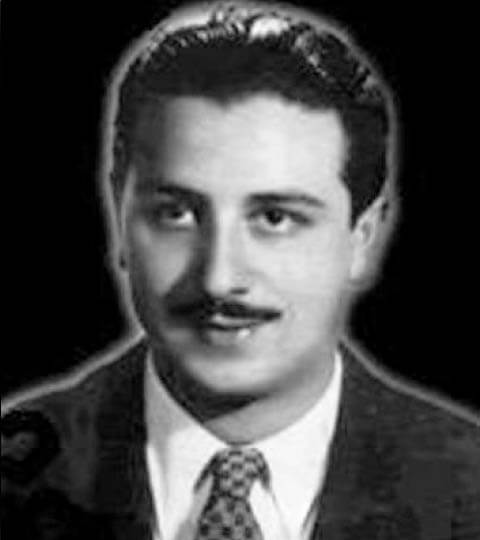
- Francisco Rotundo

Background information
- Born: Francisco Luis Rotundo; 4 November 1919; Buenos Aires, Argentina
- Died: 26 September 1997 (aged 77) Buenos Aires, Argentina
- Genre: Tango
- Occupations: Pianist, composer, orchestra conductor
- Instrument: Piano
- Years active: 20th century
- Spouse: Juanita Larrauri

Francisco Rotundo (4 November 1919 – 26 September 1997) was a pianist, composer, and orchestra conductor dedicated to the tango genre.

== Personal life ==
He was born in the Belgrano neighborhood of the city of Buenos Aires, Argentina, and his father owned an important company in the paper industry, which the musician took over after his father's death.

Since childhood, he had an inclination for music; he studied piano and earned a teaching degree, which he used to work at various conservatories.

He was married to the actress and politician Juanita Larrauri.

== Professional career ==
At the age of 17, he formed his first ensemble, and in 1944 he won a tango orchestra competition held at the traditional Palermo Palace hall, located on Godoy Cruz between Santa Fe and Cerviño, where at that time Ricardo Tanturi's orchestra performed with its iconic singers: Alberto Castillo and Enrique Campos.

He made his debut with his orchestra at the San José de Flores club during the 1945 Carnival, with contributions from poet Carlos Waiss in the presentation and commentary.

In 1947, he performed at Café El Nacional, known as the "Cathedral of Tango" on Avenida Corrientes, with great success. His orchestra featured musical arrangements by his first bandoneonist, Enrique Rossi, and in the bandoneon section, a young Luis Stazo, then 17 years old, was beginning his career. The singers were Horacio Quintana and Aldo Calderón.

For this reason, Rotundo decided that he needed to hire high-profile vocalists and shaped his orchestra to showcase the singer as much as possible. So, in late 1948, he invited Carlos Roldán—a singer who had trained with Francisco Canaro and was in Montevideo—and in March 1949, he did the same with Mario Corrales, who had left Osmar Maderna's orchestra. Corrales stayed with Rotundo's orchestra for a year before moving on to Carlos Di Sarli's orchestra, where his name was changed to Mario Pomar.

After the 1949 Carnival, Floreal Ruiz, who was enjoying great success with Aníbal Troilo, was persuaded to join Rotundo's orchestra with an offer of 100,000 pesos—part of which was intended to compensate Troilo and RCA Victor—and a monthly salary of 3,000 pesos (he had been earning 700 with Troilo) for 40 months.

In July of that year, Floreal Ruiz left Troilo and in October made his debut with Rotundo, remaining with this orchestra as its trademark until the director disbanded it in 1957. The orchestra went from performing three shows a month to more than twenty, playing at the best cabarets, while also performing on the radio and recording about 25 tracks for Odeón, including hit records such as Un infierno by Francisco Rotundo with lyrics by Reynaldo Yiso, Melenita de oro by Samuel Linning, Infamia and Esclavas blancas by Horacio Pettorossi, among others.

Another commercial breakthrough for Rotundo came in 1952 when he hired Enrique Campos, a Uruguayan who had spent three years in Ricardo Tanturi’s orchestra, establishing an elegant, subtle, and intimate style. Campos had one of the most brilliant phases of his career with Rotundo. Among other major hits, Enrique Campos recorded with Rotundo songs such as Por seguidora y por fiel by Celedonio Flores, Llorando la carta by Juan Fulginiti, and Libertad by Felipe Mitre Navas. Also from that time is the song by Charlo and González Castillo, El viejo vals, which Campos and Ruiz performed as a duet, becoming one of the biggest hits of the era.

In 1953, Julio Sosa left the Francini-Pontier orchestra and joined Rotundo's orchestra. The singer stayed for two years and developed the style that later established him as a soloist and led him to become one of the great voices of tango. Some of the hits recorded by Sosa with Rotundo included Dios te salve m’hijo, Mala suerteby Francisco Gorrindo, Bien bohemio, Levanta la frente by Antonio Nápoli, which had been popularized by Agustín Magaldi, and Secretos and Justo el 31 by Enrique Santos Discépolo. Sosa left the orchestra because he had some vocal difficulties, which he later overcame through surgery, and he always fondly remembered his time with the orchestra.

At the end of 1955, vocalist Jorge Durán joined the orchestra, and in December of that year, he recorded the waltz Poema para mi madre and the tango Sus ojos se cerraron by Alfredo Le Pera.

Between late 1956 and mid-1957—dates vary depending on the source—Alfredo Del Río left the orchestra led by "The Romantic Violin of Tango," Alfredo Gobbi (he had previously been with Pedro Laurenz’s orchestra), tempted by a lucrative financial offer from Rotundo, and joined his orchestra, sharing the stage with Enrique Campos.

With this orchestra, Enrique Campos recorded, among other songs, Todavía estás a tiempo, Destino de flor, Nunca es tarde, Disfrazados—a tango by Antonio Tello that was a major hit for Agustín Magaldi in the 1930s and which Del Río gave a memorable performance of great vocal quality—and Dicha pasada, a piece by Guillermo Barbieri that had been forgotten in repertoires but regained relevance following this recording.

Finally, he briefly added the singer Roberto Argentino, who recorded only the tango Qué tarde que has venido on September 18, 1956.

== Dissolution of the orchestra and subsequent return ==
In 1957, Rotundo dissolved his orchestra and devoted himself to running the family business, which he left at the end of the 1960s to return to music. Together with his friend Titi Rossi, he opened La Casa de Rotundo, initially located in the Liniers neighborhood and later in Villa Luro, a venue where star figures of tango performed, including Jorge Casal, Carlos Roldán, Alfredo Del Río, Mario Bustos, Alfredo Dalton, and the maestro Horacio Salgán.

== As a composer ==
As a composer, he achieved significant success with the tango "Un infierno," with lyrics by Reinaldo Yiso, in the versions performed by Floreal Ruiz and Alberto Morán. Other pieces included the instrumental tango Para florearse, Siempre tu voz, Rezongo malevo, Un cariño, Sin remordimiento, and, together with Ernesto Rossi, a tango dedicated to the football club Estudiantes de La Plata.

Francisco Rotundo died in Buenos Aires on September 26, 1997.
