= Rodolfo Biagi =

Argentine Tango musician

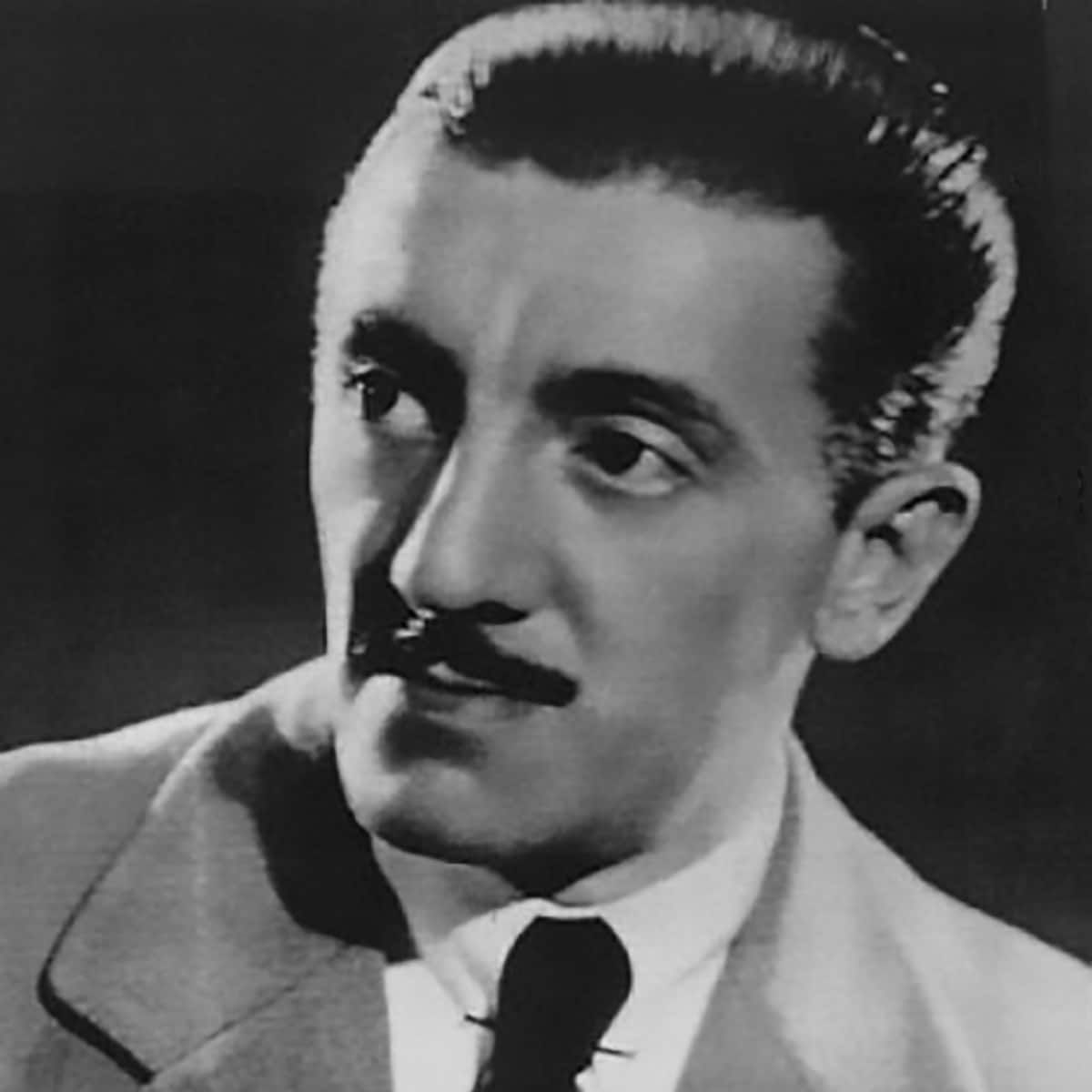
- Rodolfo Biagi

Background information
- Birth name: Rodolfo Biagi
- Also known as: Manos brujas
- Born: March 14, 1906; Buenos Aires, Argentina
- Died: September 24, 1969 (aged 63); Buenos Aires, Argentina
- Genres: Tango
- Occupation(s): Pianist, orchestra leader, composer
- Instrument: Piano

Rodolfo Biagi (March 14, 1906, in Buenos Aires – September 24, 1969) was an Argentine orchestra conductor, composer, and pianist whose nickname was "manos brujas" ("magic hands") and who is considered an important figure associated with tango music.

From 1935 to 1938, he worked as the pianist for Juan D'Arienzo's tango orchestra. In 1938, he founded his own orquesta típica.

His playing style tended to favor dancers with a fast rhythm. As a composer, he is especially remembered for the music of the tango Indiferencia and the milonga Campo afuera, with lyrics by Homero Manzi.

== Life ==
He was born in the San Telmo neighborhood of Buenos Aires. After finishing primary school, he dedicated himself to learning music, particularly the violin. He reached a compromise with his parents, who wanted him to continue his studies, so he simultaneously attended the "Mariano Acosta" Normal School for Teachers and the conservatory run by the newspaper La Prensa, where he discovered that he preferred the piano over the violin.

He began working at the age of 13, without his parents’ knowledge, as a pianist in a neighborhood cinema accompanying silent films. On one of those occasions, when he was 15 years old, he was heard by Juan Maglio, who invited him to play with him at the café El Nacional. Later, he joined the orchestra of bandoneon player Miguel Orlando, performing at the cabaret Maipú Pigall.

In 1930, alongside violinist Antonio Rodio and guitarists José María Aguilar, Guillermo Barbieri, and Domingo Riverol, he accompanied Carlos Gardel in a recording session for the Odeon label, recording the tangos Viejo smoking, Buenos Aires, and Aquellas farras, the foxtrot Yo nací para ti, tú serás para mí, and the waltz Aromas de El Cairo.

Later on, Biagi joined the orchestra of Juan Bautista Guido, and then that of Juan Canaro, with whom he performed at the Cine París and toured Brazil. In that orchestra, he met Juan Carlos Thorry, with whom he composed the tango Indiferencia.

=== In D'Arienzo’s Orchestra ===
Biagi used to frequent the Chantecler cabaret in Buenos Aires, where Juan D'Arienzo's orchestra performed. He was a friend of D'Arienzo. One night, the conductor, tired of the lateness of his pianist Lidio Fasoli, asked Biagi to replace him. D'Arienzo, known by the nickname "The King of the Beat", had developed a performance style aimed at dancers. Biagi, on the other hand, came from the school of Juan Maglio and the rhythmic and melodic standards typical of the Guardia Vieja (Old Guard). Despite their different backgrounds, the collaboration was a success.

Tango scholar Horacio Salas wrote:

“Biagi established from the keyboard a distinctive style: staccato, faster than other orchestras, monotonous and musically simple, but very danceable—ideal for those barely familiar with the basics of tango dancing, because the infectious rhythm led them along. The orchestra revived the long-forgotten 2/4 beat of the heroic trio days. Tango was regaining its original joy. It was a style not well-suited to passive listening, but full of energy for dancers. The instruments played in unison, and only an occasional bar from the leading piano could be singled out—but no more.”

In addition to performing at Chantecler, Biagi worked with D'Arienzo on LR1 Radio El Mundo, at club dances, on tours, and appeared in the film Melodías porteñas, directed by Enrique Santos Discépolo. He recorded 71 pieces with D'Arienzo between December 31, 1935—when he recorded Orillas de Plata—and June 22, 1938—when he recorded Champagne Tango.

=== With His Own Orchestra ===
Biagi debuted with his own orchestra on September 16, 1938, at the Marabú cabaret, continuing with the same dancer-friendly style. After a performance on Radio Belgrano, the advertising manager for the Palmolive company, Mr. Juan Bautista Bergerot, gave him the nickname “Manos Brujas” ("Magic Hands"), after a foxtrot by José María Aguilar that Biagi’s orchestra always used to open their performances. In 1942, he made a successful tour of Chile. In the early 1950s, he was one of the main figures on the Glostora Tango Club program on Radio El Mundo. His orchestra was also the first to appear when Argentine television began broadcasting. He later starred in the Channel 13 program Casino Philips.

Among the singers who performed with him were Teófilo Ibáñez, followed by Andrés Falgás, and then Jorge Ortiz—who became the orchestra’s most successful vocalist. Ortiz briefly left to perform with Miguel Caló but later returned to Biagi. His most memorable interpretations include Yuyo verde, Indiferencia, Pájaro ciego, Misa de once, and Soledad la de Barracas.

Other singers who passed through Biagi’s orchestra included Alberto Lago, Alberto Amor, and Carlos Acuña, noted for his versions of the tangos A la luz del candil, Lonjazos, and Uno. Also part of the orchestra were Carlos Saavedra, Carlos Heredia, Carlos Almagro, and Hugo Duval—who stayed with Biagi the longest, up until the orchestra disbanded.

Among the musicians who worked with Biagi during this period were bandoneonists Juan Migliore and Agustín Bergato; violinists Oscar del Fuente (who was also his arranger), Naum Klotzman, and Cayetano Nostro; and bassist Donato Calabrese.

Other notable collaborators included bandoneonists Alfredo Attadia, Miguel Bonano, and Ricardo Pedevilla, and violinists Marcos Larrosa, Claudio González, and again Oscar del Fuente, who also served as his arranger. Biagi even had a stand-in pianist, Juan Carlos Giampé, who replaced him on the radio on Sundays so Biagi could attend the racetrack.

Among his many compositions are the tango Cruz Diablo; the waltzes Amor y vals, Como en un cuento, and the tango Humillación, all with lyrics by Carlos Bahr; the tangos Gólgota, Magdala, and Por tener un corazón in collaboration with Francisco Gorrindo; the milongas Campo afuera and Por la güeya, with lyrics by Homero Manzi; the tango Dejá el mundo como está with Rodolfo Sciammarella; Oh, mama mía with Carlos Marín; and Indiferencia with Juan Carlos Thorry.

Biagi died suddenly on September 24, 1969, due to a drop in blood pressure.
