= Alfredo De Angelis =

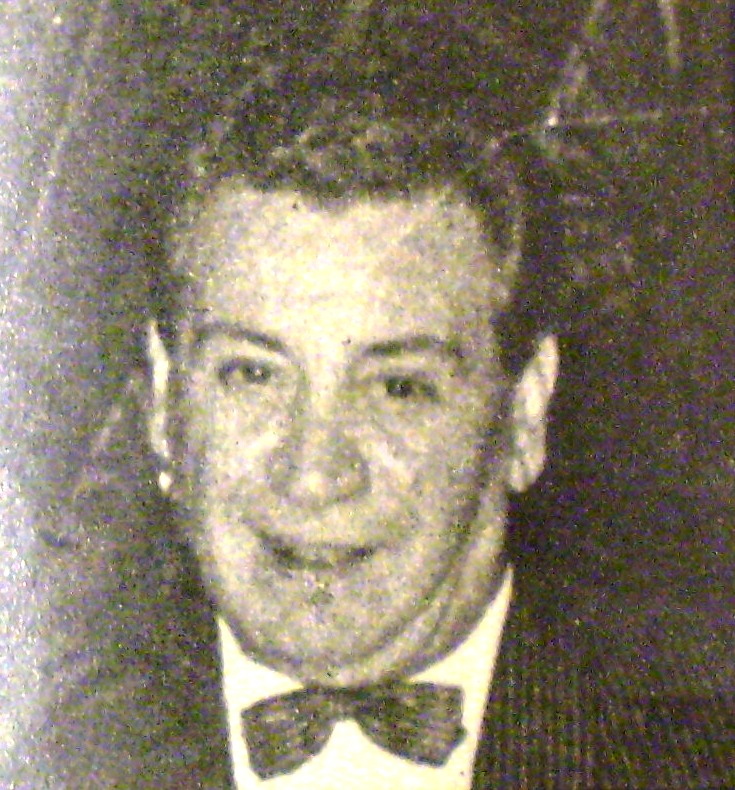

Background information
- Born: November 2, 1910; Adrogué, Buenos Aires, Argentina
- Died: March 31, 1992 (aged 81)
- Genres: Tango
- Occupations: Orchestra director; Composer; Pianist
- Instrument: Piano

Alfredo De Angelis (2 November 1910, Adrogué — 31 March 1992) was an Argentine composer, pianist, and director of tango orchestras during the Grand Era of Argentine tango.

De Angelis was born in Adrogué south of Buenos Aires city. He started his musical career by accompanying the singer Juan Giliberti, and then joined the orchestra of Anselmo Aieta as a pianist. He continued changing affiliations until 1940, until he started to create his own orchestra in 1940. The orchestra gave the first concert in café Marzotto in Buenos Aires on March 20, 1941, quickly achieved popularity, and was invited for records. De Angelis is noted for choosing good singers. The first singer in De Angelis's orchestra was Floreal Ruiz, and others included Carlos Dante, Julio Martel, Oscar Larroca, Roberto Florio, and Roberto Mancini.

De Angelis orchestra usually noted for its simple, more popular style, and concentrated on tango dancing. De Angelis stayed through his entire career (between 1943 and 1977) with the Odeon Records label and recorded in total 486 minutes.
