= Carlos Acuña =

Argentine Tango singer and composer

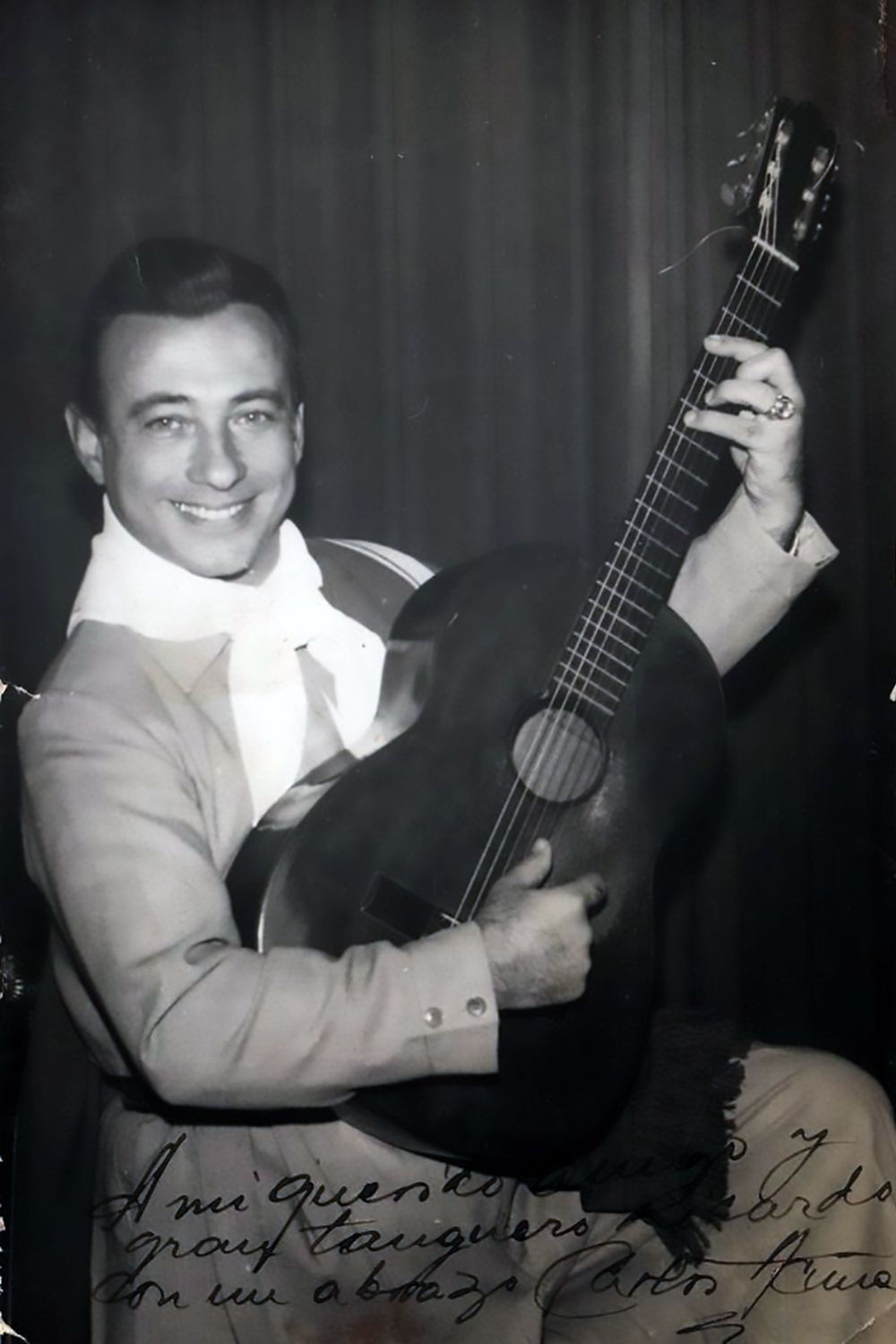
- Born: Carlos Ernesto di Loreto; November 4, 1915; Buenos Aires
- Died: February 19, 1999 (aged 84); Buenos Aires
- Occupations: Composer and singer
- Known for: Tango vocalist

Carlos Acuña (November 4, 1915 – February 19, 1999) was an Argentine Tango singer and composer. As a vocalist, he was best known for his performance of La Calesita ("The Merry-Go-Round"); and as a composer, for Un boliche ("A Tavern").

Born Carlos Ernesto di Loreto, Acuña began his career in the 1930s and became known for his deep and highly expressive voice. He performed with orchestra leaders such as Ernesto de la Cruz, Carlos di Sarli, and Mariano Mores; the poet and tango lyricist Celedonio Flores, his closest friend, introduced many of his performances until his own death in 1947.

Acuña joined Mores' orchestra in 1955, with whom he recorded 15 albums for Odeon Records. His foreign travels as a performer brought him success in Uruguay, Mexico, Italy and Spain, where he became a close friend of the exiled Juan Perón. He lived in Spain for 17 years, where he obtained great success, then returned to Argentina in 1978.

He died in Buenos Aires in 1999, and was interred in La Chacarita Cemetery.
