= Héctor Marcó =

Argentine lyricist

Héctor Marcó or stage name Hector Domingo Marcolongo (1906–1987) was an Argentine lyricist who focused mainly on the tango genre.

== Tango Compositions ==
- Well Frappé
- My Soul
- Heart
- Alley
- In a kiss of life
- Porteño
- Four lives
- The white chapel
- Porteño and Dancer
- Nido gaucho
- I love you
- Whiskey
- Argentine goal
- Leather ball with Edmundo Rivero
