= Juan Canaro =

Uruguayan singer (1892–1977)

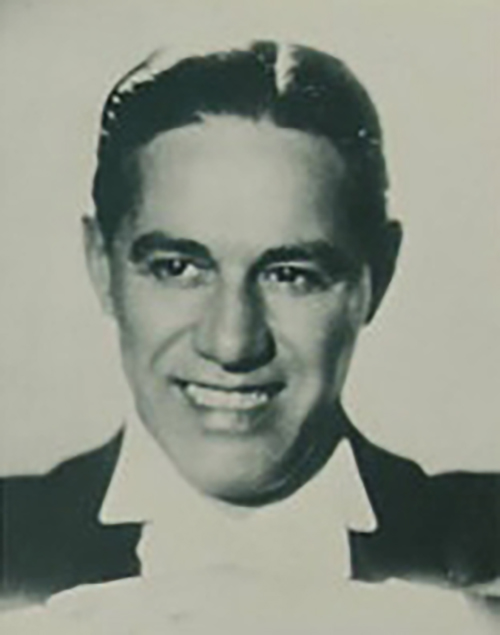

Background information
- Born: Juan Canarozzo; 23 June 1892; San José de Mayo, Uruguay
- Origin: Uruguay
- Died: 16 March 1977 (aged 84) Mar del Plata, Argentina
- Genres: Tango
- Occupations: Bandoneonist, orchestra conductor
- Instruments: Bandoneon, musical saw
- Years active: 1925–1972
- Label: Odeón

Juan Canaro (23 June 1892 – 16 March 1977) was an Uruguayan singer, conductor, bandoneonist, and composer who settled in Argentina. His brothers were the orchestra conductors Francisco Canaro and Rafael Canaro.

== Professional career ==
In 1907, his neighbor and close friend Vicente Fiorentino, who already played the violin in small groups, encouraged Juan to take up studying the bandoneon, teaching him some simple tunes using numbered notation. After much effort, he managed to learn two pieces. He continued studying but didn't dare to perform in public. He eventually did so at some local festivals alongside Vicente Fiorentino (violin) and Luis Martínez (Papanova) on guitar. After overcoming that challenge, they later performed in Junín and Pergamino.

Juan Canaro made his debut in 1917 as a bandoneon player in his brother Francisco's orchestra, which was performing at the Royal Pigall cabaret at the time. Juan had already composed his first tango, Mano brava, which he dedicated to the bandoneon player Minotto Di Cicco and which premiered in Montevideo in 1915.

He spent many years in the ensemble of his famous brother, with whom he traveled to Paris in 1925 and to New York City the following year. He returned to France from North America, and together with his brother Rafael Canaro, led an orchestra with which they toured several European countries, promoting tango until 1931.

Upon returning to Buenos Aires, he performed on the radio with his own ensemble, also playing at dances and nightclubs. Always with his own group, he toured throughout the Americas and in 1954 even traveled to Japan, where he performed with great success.

With his orchestra, he recorded for the labels Victor, Odeon, and Pampa; celebrated female singers such as the sisters Violeta and Lidia Desmond, María de la Fuente, Irma Flores, Dorita Verdi, and Susy Leiva performed with him, as well as male singers Aldo Campoamor, Fernando Díaz, and Roberto Arrieta.

He composed several pieces, collaborating with Juan Andrés Caruso, Jesús Fernández Blanco, Carlos Pesce, Osvaldo Sosa Cordero, and Fernando Ochoa.

Juan Canaro was a close friend of Carlos Gardel, who recorded his tangos Desengaño, El pinche, Camarada, and La brisa, with lyrics by Caruso.

== Compositions ==
- Mano brava
- Ave María
- El copete
- El atorrante
- El bacarat
- Clavelito
- Un capricho
- Desengaño
- Camarada
- La brisa
- El pinche
- Estela
- Mi petite
- Ahí va el dulce
- Cuando yo era pibe
- Copa de ajenjo
- El sabio
- Abuelita
- Santa Paula
- Lágrimas de amor
- Campo
- Pipistrela
- A su majestad
- Bendita seas
- El pangaré
- Y a mí qué
- Sueño de muñeca
- Quejas
- Lo que vieron mis ojos
- La noche que me esperes
