= Anselmo Aieta =

Argentine musician

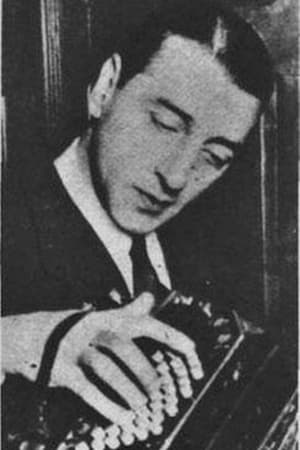
- Anselmo Aieta
- Born: Anselmo Alfredo Aieta; November 5, 1896; San Telmo, Buenos Aires, Argentina
- Died: September 25, 1964 (aged 67)
- Occupation: Composer

Anselmo Alfredo Aieta (November 5, 1896 – September 25, 1964) was an Argentine bandoneon musician, composer and occasional actor.

== Professional career ==
He joined Francisco Canaro's orchestra in 1919 and left it in 1923. Around that time, he met the poet Francisco García Jiménez, with whom he composed his greatest hits. He later formed his own orchestra.

In 1925, he joined the Orquesta Típica Paramount, along with Juan D'Arienzo, Alfredo De Angelis and Ángel D'Agostino, among others.

He was one of Carlos Gardel's favorite composers, and Gardel recorded sixteen of his compositions. One of his most popular pieces was the waltz Palomita blanca (1929), with lyrics by Francisco García Jiménez, which was recorded numerous times both in and outside of his country.

== Filmography ==
- 1924 - Mientras Buenos Aires duerme (actor)
- 1937 - Los Locos del cuarto piso (actor/musician)
