= Agustín Magaldi =

Argentine singer (1898–1938)

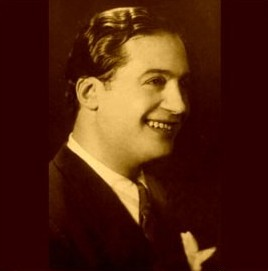
Agustín Magaldi

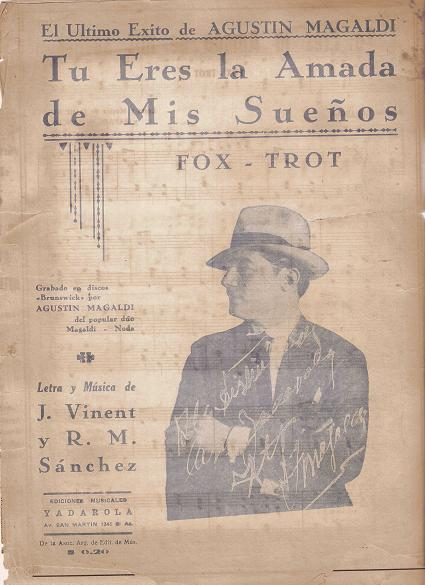
Tu eres la amada de mis sueños, Rafael Miguel Sánchez for Agustín Magaldi

Agustín Magaldi Coviello (December 1, 1898 – September 8, 1938) was an Argentine tango and milonga singer. His nickname was "La voz sentimental de Buenos Aires" ("The sentimental voice of Buenos Aires"). Magaldi took part in the opening broadcasts of Argentina's LOY Radio Nacional in July 1924.

Magaldi suffered from liver disease and was admitted to Sanatorium Otamendi early in September 1938. An operation by Dr. Pedro Valdez was successful, but Magaldi died 48 hours later. He was buried in La Chacarita Cemetery in Buenos Aires.

== Portrayal in Evita ==
In the Andrew Lloyd Webber and Tim Rice musical Evita, Magaldi is depicted as bringing Eva to Buenos Aires and so is therefore referred to as "the first man to be of use to Eva Duarte".

There is some disagreement, however, about the role Magaldi played in Eva's real life, or that they knew each other. For example, in the 1981 biography Evita: The Real Life of Eva Perón, biographers Marysa Navarro and Nicholas Fraser write that there are no records of Magaldi performing in Eva's hometown of Junín in the year that Eva is said to have met Magaldi:

"Most accounts of Evita's life say that she fell in love with the spotlight image of Magaldi or that she decided to seduce him and use him; but that, in either event, she was introduced to him, asked him to take her to Buenos Aires, and when he wavered, forced her way into his train compartment and rode with him to the city, thus leaving her family and becoming a married man's mistress. Yet there is no record of the tango singer's having come to Junín that year. Magaldi, a mild man who was devoted to his mother, used to bring his wife on tour, and it is hard to understand what he would have seen in small, skinny Eva María. If he did help her leave Junín, it is likely that his assistance was of the most innocuous kind. Evita's sister insists that doña Juana, prodded by don Pepe, accompanied Evita to the city. According to her account, mother and daughter kept visiting the radio stations until they found a programme for which a young girl was needed."

A major deviation from history is that the musical depicts Magaldi as performing at a charity concert given in aid of the victims of an earthquake in San Juan, Argentina. The concert, where Eva Duarte and Juan Perón met for the first time, occurred on January 22, 1944 when Magaldi had been dead for over five years.
