= Juan d'Arienzo =

Argentine musician

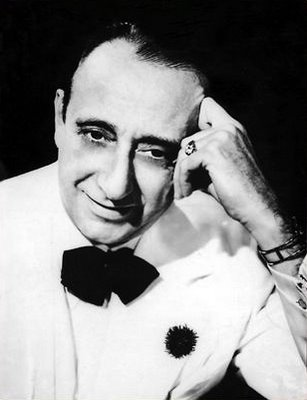

Background information
- Born: December 14, 1900
- Died: January 14, 1976 (aged 75)
- Genres: Tango, Milonga
- Instruments: Bandoneon, Violin, Piano

Juan d'Arienzo (December 14, 1900 – January 14, 1976) was an Argentine tango musician, also known as "El Rey del Compás" (King of the Beat). He was a violinist, band leader, and composer.

He was the son of Italian immigrants and used more modern arrangements and instrumentation; his popular group produced hundreds of recordings.

His first memorable performance was in 1919 at the Nacional theater during the comic play by Alberto Novión, El cabaret Montmartre.

He received the nickname Rey del Compás (King of the Beat), from Príncipe Cubano, at the Florida cabaret when he was replacing Osvaldo Fresedo. He said: "Mine was always a tough orchestra, with a very swinging, much nervous, vibrant beat. And it was that way because tango, for me, has three things: beat, impact and nuances. An orchestra ought to have, above all, life. That is why mine lasted more than fifty years. And when the Prince gave me that title, I thought that it was OK, that he was right."

His music is played often at milongas in Buenos Aires.

His recordings were accompanied by singers: Alberto Echagüe, Armando Laborde, Héctor Maure, Jorge Valdez, Alberto Reynal, Antonio Prieto, Carlos Casares, Carlos Dante, Enrique Carbel, Francisco Fiorentino, Horacio Palma, Héctor Millán, Mario Bustos, Juan Carlos Lamas, Libertad Lamarque, Mercedes Serrano, Raquel Notar, Osvaldo Ramos, Roberto Lemos and Walter Cabral.

He recorded more than 1000 tangos, milongas and fast valses, wrote lyrics for 3 tangos, composed 46 tangos.

The TANGO-DJ.AT Database lists more than 6,700 different transfers of recordings by d'Arienzo from 78-rpm discs, LPs, CDs and digital sources.

He is interred in the La Chacarita Cemetery in Buenos Aires, Argentina.

== Filmography ==
Juan D'Arienzo participated in several movies:

- Una ventana al éxito (1966)
- La voz de mi ciudad (1953)
- El cantor del pueblo (1948)
- Yo quiero ser bataclana (1941)
- Melodías porteñas (1937)
- ¡Tango! (1933)
