= Cape Verdean diaspora =

Diaspora community

The Cabo Verdean diaspora refers to both historical and present emigration from Cape Verde. Today, more Cabo Verdeans live abroad than in Cape Verde itself. The country with the largest number of Cape Verdeans living abroad is the United States.

== Notable people of Cabo Verdean descent ==
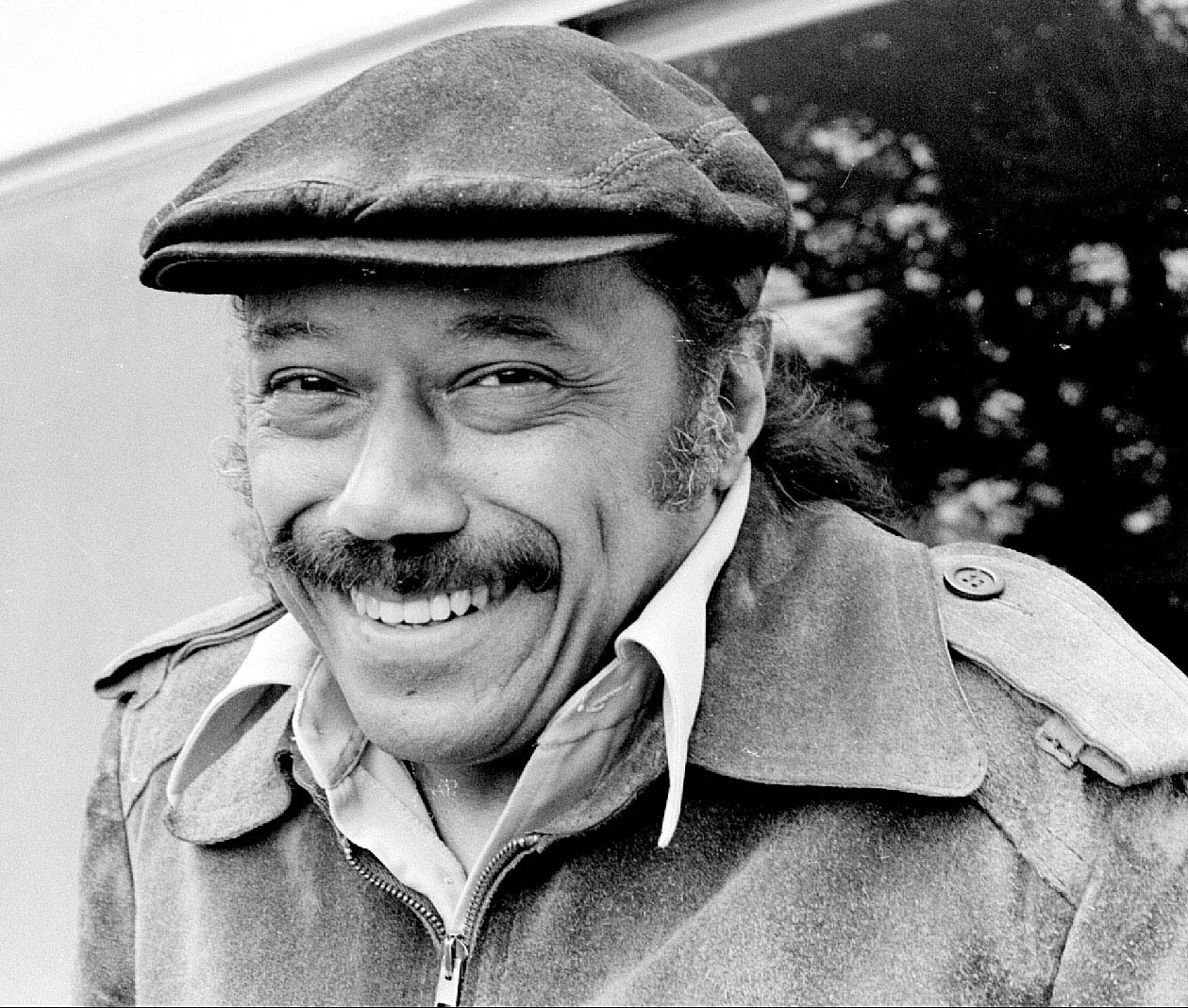
Horace Silver, a jazz pianist and composer, is of Cape Verdean descent

- Michael Beach – American actor of Cabo Verdean descent
- Blu Cantrell – singer
- Sonia Citron – basketball player for the Notre Dame Fighting Irish and the Washington Mystics
- José Ramos Delgado – association football player
- Peter Gomes – American preacher and theologian
- Ryan Gomes – former basketball player for the Boston Celtics, now coaching for the Providence Friars
- Paul Gonsalves – jazz tenor saxophonist and soloist, known especially for his work with Duke Ellington
- Tony Gonzalez – hall of fame former player for the Kansas City Chiefs and Atlanta Falcons, now an analyst on Amazon Prime NFL’s pregame show
- Henrik Larsson – former football player for Celtic F.C., FC Barcelona, Manchester United and Helsingborgs IF
- George N. Leighton – retired American judge
- Dave Leitao – basketball coach at DePaul University
- Lura – a singer born in Portugal to parents from the Cape Verde islands
- Davey Lopes – former Major League Baseball second baseman and manager
- Nani – (football) winger
- Paul Pena – singer, songwriter, guitarist, and subject of the documentary Genghis Blues
- Amber Rose – model, recording artist, actress and socialite
- Horace Silver – jazz pianist and composer
- Tavares – R&B/Soul group composed of five brothers
- Patrick Vieira – football (soccer) player whose career has involved spells at French, Italian, UK and US clubs
- Nancy Vieira – singer based in Lisbon
- Alexis Nikole Nelson – American forager and TikTok creator

== International communities ==
=== Africa ===
- Cape Verdean Angolan
- Cape Verdean Guinea-Bissauan
- Cape Verdean Sao Tomese
- Cape Verdeans in Senegal
- Cape Verdeans in South Africa

=== Europe ===
- Cape Verdeans in the Netherlands
- Cape Verdeans in France
- Cape Verdeans in Belgium
- Cape Verdeans in Italy
- Cape Verdeans in Luxembourg – As of the 2021 census, 2562 Cape Verdean nationals live in Luxembourg, accounting for 0.4% of the total population and 0.8% of the foreign population.
- Cape Verdeans in Portugal
- Cape Verdeans in Spain
- Cape Verdeans in Switzerland
- Cape Verdeans in Ireland

=== North America ===
- Cape Verdean Americans
- Cape Verdeans in Cuba

=== South America ===
- Cape Verdean Argentines
- Cape Verdeans in Brazil
- Cape Verdeans in Bolivia

== See also ==
- History of Cape Verde
- List of Cape Verdeans
- Category:People of Cape Verdean descent
