= José María Aguilar Porrás =

Argentinian singer and actor born in Uruguay

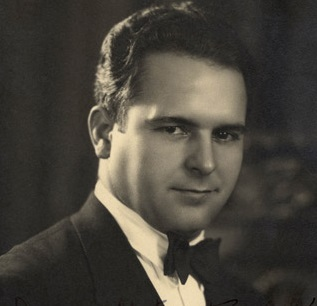
- Born: José María Aguilar Porrás; May 3, 1891; San Ramón, Canelones, Uruguay
- Died: December 21, 1951 (aged 60); Buenos Aires, Argentina
- Other name: Indio
- Occupations: Musician composer singer
- Years active: 1920–1951

José María "Indio" Aguilar Porrás (May 3, 1891 – December 21, 1951) was an Uruguayan guitarist, singer, and composer.

== Life ==
Until 1920, he worked in Uruguay with the payador Juan Pedro López. That year, he crossed the Río de la Plata with a fellow countryman to perform as a guitarist at the La Argentina hall and the Teatro Nacional in Buenos Aires. In 1922, he recorded guitar solos for the RCA Victor record label, and the following year, a duet with Enrique Maciel and later with Pagés.

He was an accompanist for Agustín Magaldi (and his duo Magaldi-Noda), Ignacio Corsini (who was the first to accompany him in his record recordings), Gómez-Vila, Pelaia-Catán, Alberto Vila, Adhelma Falcón (sister of Ada Falcón), and Carlos Gardel, with whom he traveled to Europe.

== Works ==
His compositions feature his own lyrics or were made in collaboration with Enrique Cadícamo, Celedonio Esteban Flores, José M. Macías, Eugenio Cárdenas, or Juan Pedro López.

His tangos that deserve mention include El abrojal, A mi palomita, El gran técnico, Cuando me entrés a fallar, Perro, Entre dos luces, Esa es mi tipo; his styles La espera, Al pie de la reja, El pañuelo de seda, El facón, La mañanita, Quejas, and Luna gaucha; his zambas Las margaritas and El biguá; and his waltz Cuando miran tus ojos, which have lyrics by Cele Flores, Francisco Brancatti, José Antonio Saldías, Ignacio Corsini, Atilio Supparo, Juan M. Velich, Eugenio Cárdenas, Salvador Riese, Cadícamo, and were recorded by Corsini, Magaldi, Rivero, and other singers.

Indio Aguilar recorded many works of his own production: Manos brujas (fox-trot); Ofrenda gaucha (style); Las madreselvas (zamba); the tangos Milonguera, Flor campera, Trenzas negras, Al mundo le falta un tornillo, Tengo miedo, and Lloró como una mujer; the waltzes Añoranzas, Aromas de El Cairo, Manuelita, and Mala suerte.

He was also a singer and, by 1925, formed the duo Aguilar-Fugazot.

== With Carlos Gardel ==
His relationship with Carlos Gardel was not without issues, such as those that led the singer to expel him from his ensemble in the early 1930s.

In 1934, Gardel, who was filming at Paramount in New York City at the time, requested that some of his former collaborators be sent from Buenos Aires: guitarists Ángel Domingo Riverol and Guillermo Barbieri. Aguilar also joined them, reinstated to the team due to his great quality as a guitarist.

Gardel gave him the nickname "Indio," and as a gift, he gave him a pet and the head of an Indian, saying: "Here, this is your portrait."

== Death ==
Aguilar was present and survived with severe injuries in the airplane accident on June 24, 1935, in Medellín, in which Carlos Gardel, Alfredo Le Pera, and guitarists Guillermo Barbieri and Ángel Domingo Riverol died, while they were on a tour in Latin America.

He left an unpublished book titled Yo acompañé a Carlos Gardel (I Accompanied Carlos Gardel).

After the airplane accident in Medellín, Aguilar was left blind and completely disfigured by the burns he suffered.

In December 1951, tragedy struck him again when he was run over in front of Plaza Pueyrredón while attempting to board a taxi coming from the opposite direction; he was hit by a car, fracturing one of his legs. He was hospitalized at the Álvarez Hospital, and unexpectedly died from pulmonary edema on December 21, 1951.

He was sixty years old. He was survived by his second wife, the singer Chola Vetere.

== Bibliography ==
- Barsky, Osvaldo; Barsky, Julián (2004). Gardel, la biografía. Buenos Aires: Taurus. ISBN 9870400132.
- Loriente, Horacio. "José María Aguilar". Todo Tango. Archived from the original on 5 March 2014.
- Adet, Manuel (11 May 2013). "El "Indio" José María Aguilar". El Litoral.
