= Juan Carlos Cobos =

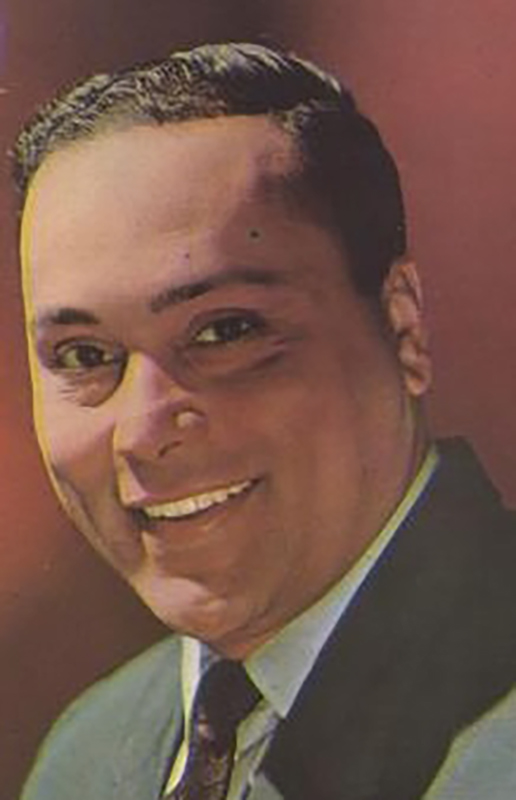
- Juan Carlos Cobos

Background information
- Born: June 5, 1928; Punta Alta, Buenos Aires, Argentina
- Died: November 10, 1999 (aged 71) Buenos Aires, Argentina
- Genres: Tango
- Occupations: Singer, composer, lyricist
- Instruments: Vocals, guitar
- Years active: 1940s–1950s

Lorenzo Joaquín Pires (5 June 1928 – 10 November 1999), better known by his stage name Juan Carlos Cobos, was an Argentine singer, lyricist, and composer, known for his performances with the Orquesta típica Osvaldo Pugliese during the 1950s.

== Life ==
Born in Punta Alta, in the Buenos Aires Province, Cobos moved to La Plata during his childhood, where he completed technical studies at an industrial school. His interest in music led him to study guitar and singing at a local conservatory.

At the age of 17, he made his debut with the Lucini Quartet of La Plata and later joined the orchestra of pianist Ernesto Darío Saborido. He subsequently became part of the orchestra led by Alberto Forti and Jorge Parodi, singing alongside Jorge Miranda. During that period, Cobos used the stage name Alberto Ortiz.

In 1951, singer Jorge Vidal left the Orquesta Típica Osvaldo Pugliese and was replaced by Alberto Morán. In 1953, Pugliese decided to add another singer and held auditions. Encouraged by his friends, Cobos participated and was selected after a few trials, beginning in March of that year under his final stage name: Juan Carlos Cobos.

== Career with Osvaldo Pugliese ==
During his brief but significant time with Pugliese's orchestra, Cobos recorded seven tracks between May 1953 and May 1954.

- Caminito soleado, performed as a duet with Alberto Morán.
- Milonguera (José María Aguilar). This song became his great hit.
- Olvidao (Guillermo Barbieri, Enrique Cadícamo).
- Es preciso que te vayas (Juan Carlos Cobián, Celedonio Flores).
- Picaneao (Héctor Baldi, Enrique Cadícamo).
- No es más que yo (Luis Mandarino, Enrique Dizeo).
- Te aconsejo que me olvides (Pedro Maffia, Jorge Curi).

In a tribute held in 1985 on Canal 9, Osvaldo Pugliese highlighted Cobos as one of the few singers who deeply adapted to the style of his orchestra, along with Roberto Chanel and Alberto Morán.

Juan Carlos Cobos died on November 10, 1999, in La Plata.
