= Ángel Domingo Riverol =

Argentinian guitarist (1893–1935)

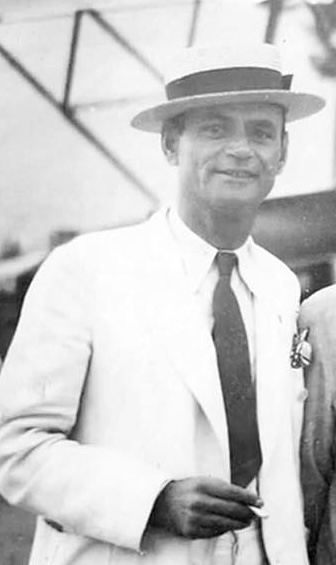
- Born: October 1, 1893; Buenos Aires, Argentina
- Died: June 26, 1935 (aged 41); Medellín, Colombia
- Occupations: Singer, composer, guitarist
- Spouse: Aurelia Guliano

Ángel Domingo Riverol (Buenos Aires; October 1, 1893 – Medellín, June 26, 1935) was one of Carlos Gardel's Argentine guitarists.

== Life ==
He was born in the Montserrat neighborhood in October 1893. He was the youngest of six children of the couple Ángel Riverol and Dolores Cabral, both born in Las Palmas, Spain. It was his mother who taught him to play the guitar when he was only ten years old.

He began his career in 1914 with the bandoneon player Juan Canaro, brother of Francisco, touring San Pedro, Bragado, and other cities in the province of Buenos Aires, without much success. Later, he accompanied Ignacio Corsini, who was performing at the "Teatro de Verano" with José Podestá's company. Married since 1913, he made a living working as a painter and wallpaper hanger, a job he had to give up some time later due to surgery for a stomach ulcer.

In 1915, he refined his skills using his preferred musical instrument, a nine-string guitar, in a trio that included violinist Enrique Gímenez and a bandoneon player named Alonso. He played in various cafés with several musicians from the golden age.

In 1916 and 1917, he accompanied the well-remembered duo Greco-Riverol—formed by singers Ángel Greco and his cousin Ignacio Riverol—in their performances at the Casino Theater. In 1917, he joined a trio with the great bandoneon player Carlos Marcucci and the violinist Raimundo "Mumo" Orsi.

In 1921, he formed a duo with guitarist and composer Antonio di Benedetto, also accompanying a singer named Remvenutto. In 1924 and 1925, he collaborated with Roberto Díaz and Pedro Noda. In 1928, he accompanied Libertad Lamarque, and the following year, Carlos Dix. That same year, together with Di Benedetto, he accompanied the vocal duo Pidoto-Argüello, made up of Pedro Pidoto and Ramón Eladio Argüello, creators of the well-remembered waltz Adoración, and with guitarist Juan José Buscaglia, they accompanied the singer Héctor Wilde. Starting in 1928, he accompanied singer Domingo Conte and his then-duo partner Pascual Ferrandino. He also worked with bandoneon players Julián Divasto and Fernando Montoni.

== With Gardel ==
Initially, Gardel had offered Emilio Sola a place on his team, but due to opposition from his family, he was unable to accept. As a result, he recommended that Gardel consider Riverol.

While Riverol was doing some painting work at the café "Los 36 Billares" on Corrientes Street, José María Aguilar went to his house on behalf of Gardel. Since he wasn't home, Aguilar asked for his address and returned with the singer, who later sent Riverol a telegram with the address of his own house (San Pedro 6650), where the audition would take place.

Becoming Gardel's fourth guitarist (in chronological order), he made his debut on March 20, 1930, accompanying him alongside Guillermo Barbieri and José María Aguilar, recording the tangos:

- Juventud
- Corazón de papel
- Buenos Aires
- Palomita blanca
- Aromas del Cairo

Starting on April 4, they performed on Radio Nacional until the end of May, and from April 9 to May 3, they performed at the Empire Theater.

He began his most important professional stage with Carlos Gardel in March 1930, although he had already been associated with him since September 1929.

In February 1931, after José María Aguilar temporarily retired, he accompanied Barbieri until September of that same year. He participated in the film Las luces de Buenos Aires, accompanying Gardel on the song El rosal and singing the chacarera La sufrida in a duet.

He collaborated on some of the tangos that the Zorzal (Carlos Gardel) presented in his films and concerts. Although he did not focus on composing, he left five compositions that were of great use to Gardel:

- Mañanitas de campo
- Trovas
- Falsas promesas
- Rosal de amor
- Con la cruz a cuestas

When Gardel left for Europe in 1933, Riverol accompanied other great artists of the time in Buenos Aires, such as Azucena Maizani, Mercedes Simone, Teófilo Ibáñez, Oscar Ugarte, Armando Barbé, Mercedes Carné, Adhelma Falcón, and Julia Ferro.

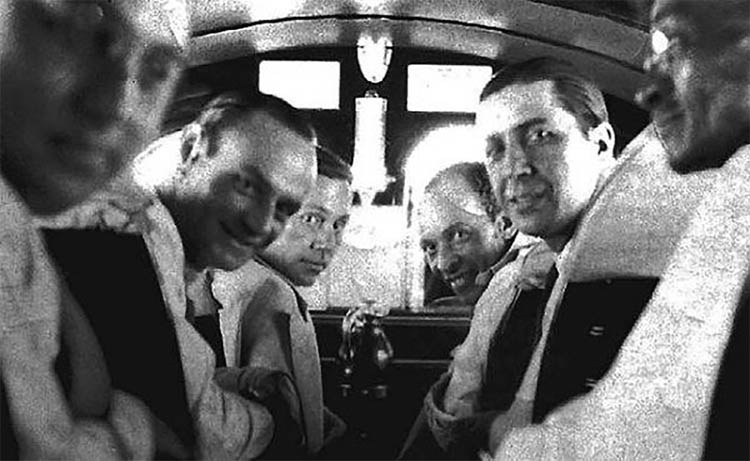
Last photo of Ángel Domingo Riverol, with Carlos Gardel.

== Death ==
Ángel Domingo Riverol was returning on June 24, 1935, from Medellín, Colombia, on the same plane, "Panamericana," as Gardel and other musicians like Guillermo Barbieri and Alfredo Le Pera, when it exploded shortly after takeoff after colliding with another plane. Unlike the others, Riverol died two days later as a result of the severe injuries he sustained.

His remains, along with those of the other guitarists who died in the accident, are buried in La Chacarita Cemetery, in Buenos Aires.

He was married to Aurelia Giuliano from 1913 until his death.
