= Cape Verdean Argentines =

Caboverdiano-argentinos (Spanish)
- (Argentina) (Cape Verde)
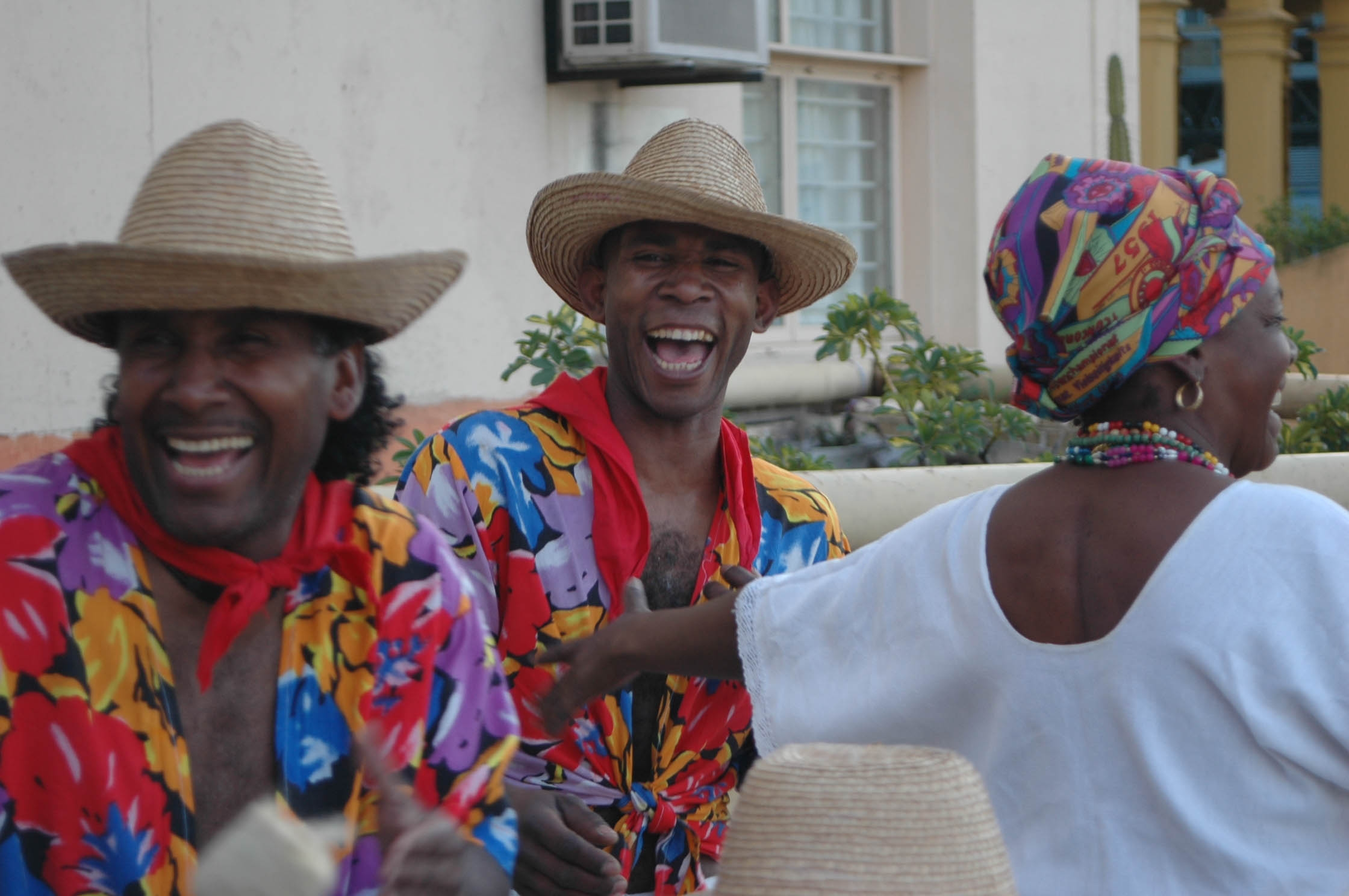
- Argentines of Cape Verdean descent from Buenos Aires in 2012

Total population
- 30,000-35,000" (by ancestry, 2023); 0.07% of the Argentine population

Regions with significant populations
- Buenos Aires

Languages
- Spanish · Portuguese · Cape Verdean

Religion
- Roman Catholicism

Related ethnic groups
- Cape Verdeans; Cape Verdean Americans · Cape Verdean Cubans · Cape Verdean Portuguese · Cape Verdean French · Cape Verdean Dutch

Cape Verdean Argentines (Spanish: Caboverdiano-argentinos) are Argentines of predominantly or total Cape Verdean descent or Cape Verdean-born people who reside in Argentina. According to the 1980 census, there were about 8,000; but today's population was estimated by some sources to be around 2,000 in 2007. Other sources estimate that in 2023 there were 35,000 descendants of immigrants from Cape Verde living in Argentina.

Prior to independence in 1975, Cape Verdean immigrants were registered as Portuguese immigrants from the overseas province of Portuguese Cape Verde. The first Cape Verdeans immigrated to Argentina in small numbers in the late 19th century. The numbers increased dramatically from the 1920s to World War II. The busiest periods were between 1927 and 1933 and the third, after 1946. They were driven from Cape Verde by lack of jobs, resources, and opportunities.

Most Cape Verdeans and their descendants are centered in Buenos Aires Province. They were expert sailors and fishermen; which is why most of them settled close to the shore or in ports, and obtained sea-related occupations. They settled in ports such as Rosario, Buenos Aires, San Nicolás de los Arroyos, Bahía Blanca, Ensenada and Dock Sud. 95% of them got jobs in the Argentine Navy's Sea Fleet, in the Merchant Navy, or in the Fluvial Fleet in YPF, dockyards or ELMA.

Two organizations for mutual support and cultural exchange have existed for over 60 years: the Sociedad de Socorros Mutuos "Unión Caboverdeana" de Dock Sud (English: Dock Sud "Cape Verdean Union" Mutual Aid Society), founded in 1932, and the Club Caboverdeano de Ensenada, a founded around the same period but largely focused on cultural and sports activities.

== Notable Cape Verdean-Argentines ==
- Diego Alonso Gómez, actor
- Juan Carlos Cobos, singer
- Ayrton Costa, footballer
- Adriano Custódio Mendes, footballer
- Roberto Giordano, hairdresser
- Manuel Miranda, footballer
- José Ramos Delgado, footballer
- Facundo Silva, footballer
- María Fernanda Silva, diplomat
- Cristian Tissone, footballer
- Fernando Tissone, footballer
