= 1935 Medellín Airport runway collision =

1935 aviation accident

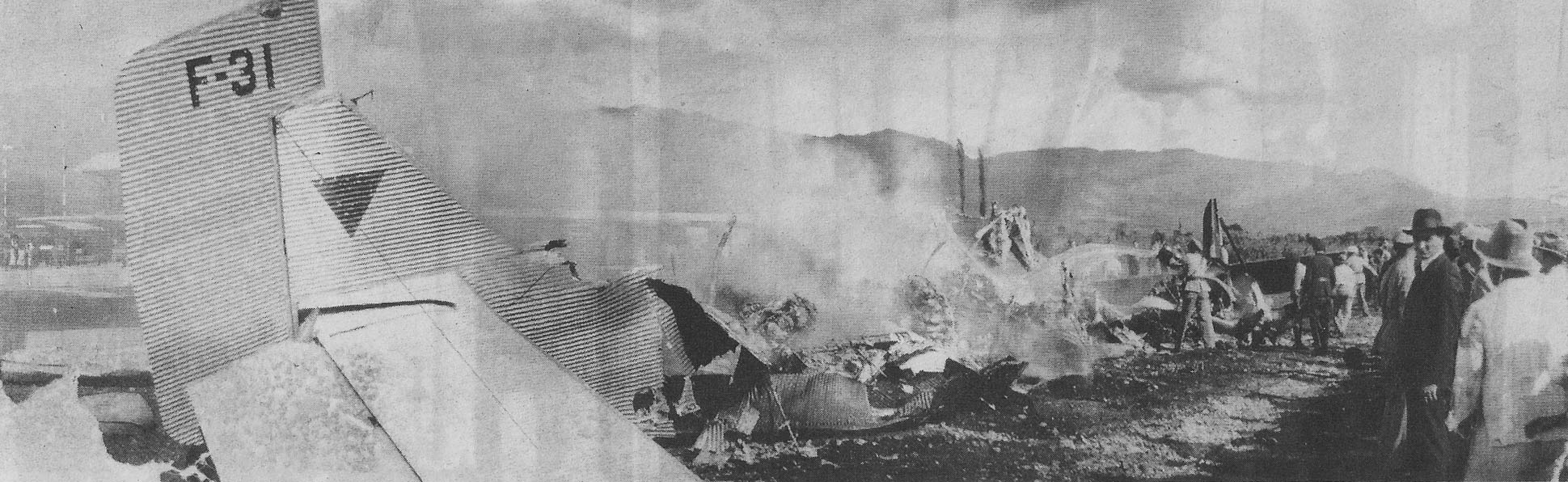
- Aftermath of the accident

Accident
- Date: June 24, 1935
- Summary: Runway excursion and collision following a loss of control
- Site: Medellín-Enrique Olaya Herrera Airport, Colombia
- Total fatalities: 17
- Total survivors: 3

First aircraft
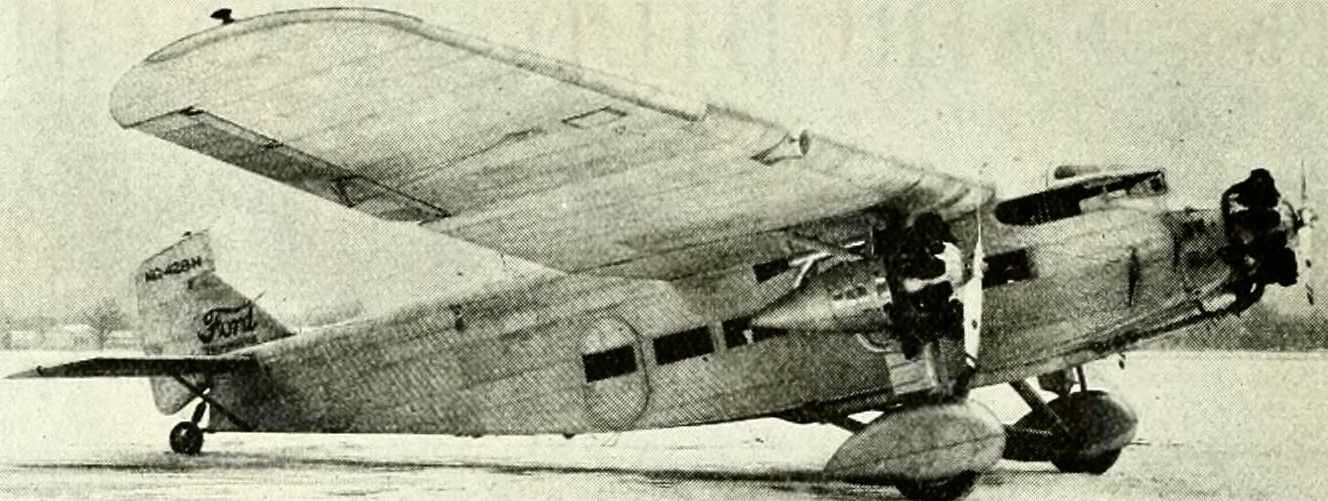
- A Ford 5-AT-B Trimotor, similar to the aircraft involved in the accident.
- Type: Ford 5-AT-B Trimotor
- Operator: SACO
- Registration: F-31
- Flight origin: Medellín-Enrique Olaya Herrera Airport (EOH), Colombia
- Destination: Bogotá Eldorado Airport (BOG), Colombia
- Occupants: 13
- Passengers: 11
- Crew: 2
- Fatalities: 10
- Injuries: 3
- Survivors: 3

Second aircraft
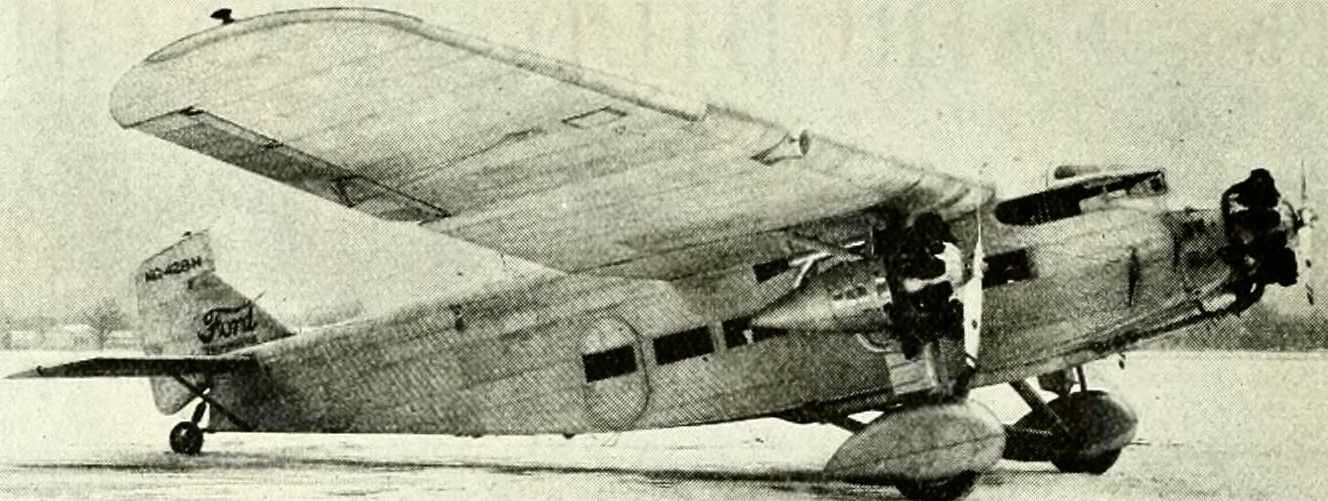
- A Ford 5-AT-B Trimotor, similar to the aircraft involved in the accident.
- Type: Ford 5-AT-B Trimotor
- Operator: SCADTA
- Registration: C-31
- Flight origin: Medellín-Enrique Olaya Herrera Airport (EOH), Colombia
- Destination: Bogotá Eldorado Airport (BOG), Colombia
- Occupants: 7
- Passengers: 4
- Crew: 3
- Fatalities: 7
- Survivors: 0

The Medellin plane crash of 1935 was an accident involving two Ford 5-AT-B Trimotor aircraft at Olaya Herrera Airport in Medellín, Colombia on the afternoon of Monday, June 24, 1935, killing all but 3 of the 20 people involved.

Among the dead were Argentine tango singer Carlos Gardel, the co-author of the majority of his songs, Alfredo Le Pera, and one his guitarists, Guillermo Barbieri.

== Background ==
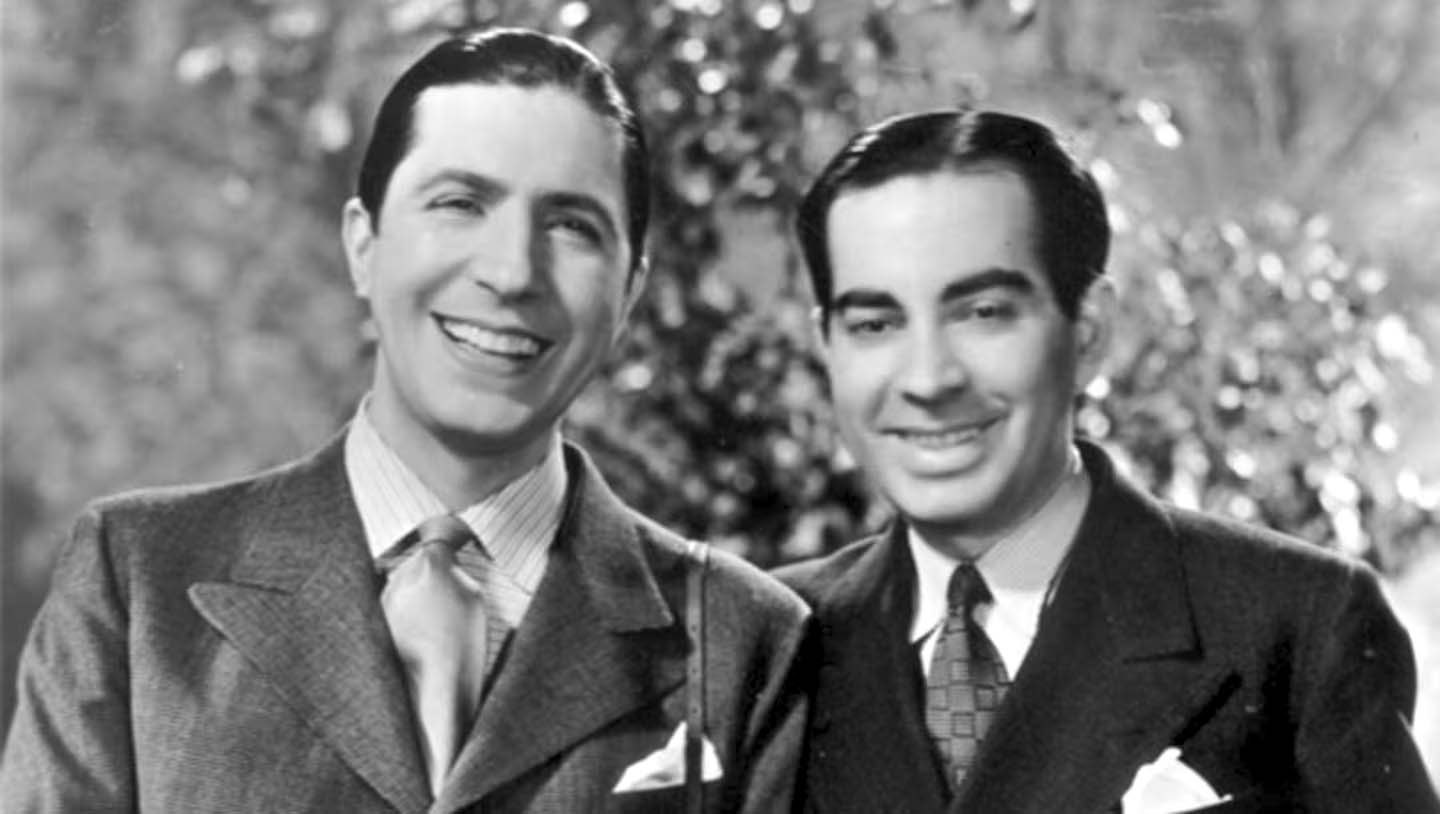
Carlos Gardel (left) and Alfredo LePera died in the accident

Gardel was tired after touring Puerto Rico, Aruba, Curaçao and Venezuela. He had already accumulated more than 60 performances since April 1, and there were still performances left in Colombia, Havana, and Mexico, after which he would return, without vacation, to New York to act in a few films. He would then visit his mother in Toulouse and would return afterwards.

The delegation had gotten off the plane that came from Bogotá to make a brief stopover in Cali, where a crowd of 5,000 people was waiting to see Gardel perform at the Isaacs Theater.

== Crew ==
The first aircraft (F-31) was under the command of Captain Ernesto Samper Mendoza (the great uncle of Colombian president Ernesto Samper) and a first officer, while the second plane's (C-31) crew consisted of Captain Hans Ulrich Thom and First Officer Hartmann Fuerst.

== Accident ==
The SACO F-31 plane was scheduled to take off from Olaya Herrera Airport in Medellín, Colombia at 2:51 pm on Monday, June 24, 1935, on a scheduled flight to Bogotá, Colombia, carrying 2 crew and 11 passengers including Gardel and his entourage. F-31 started accelerating down the runway when it suddenly started to swerve before losing control.

It veered off the runway and collided with a taxiing aircraft (C-31, nicknamed Manizales), an explosion followed which engulfed both planes in flames. All passengers and crew on the taxiing C-31 were killed in the accident, while only 3 aboard F-31 survived with various injuries. Gardel was killed in the crash.

== Aircraft ==
The Ford 5-AT-B Trimotors involved were built in 1928 and 1932, respectively. The aircraft were respectively operated by SACO and SCADTA at the time of the accident.

== Aftermath ==
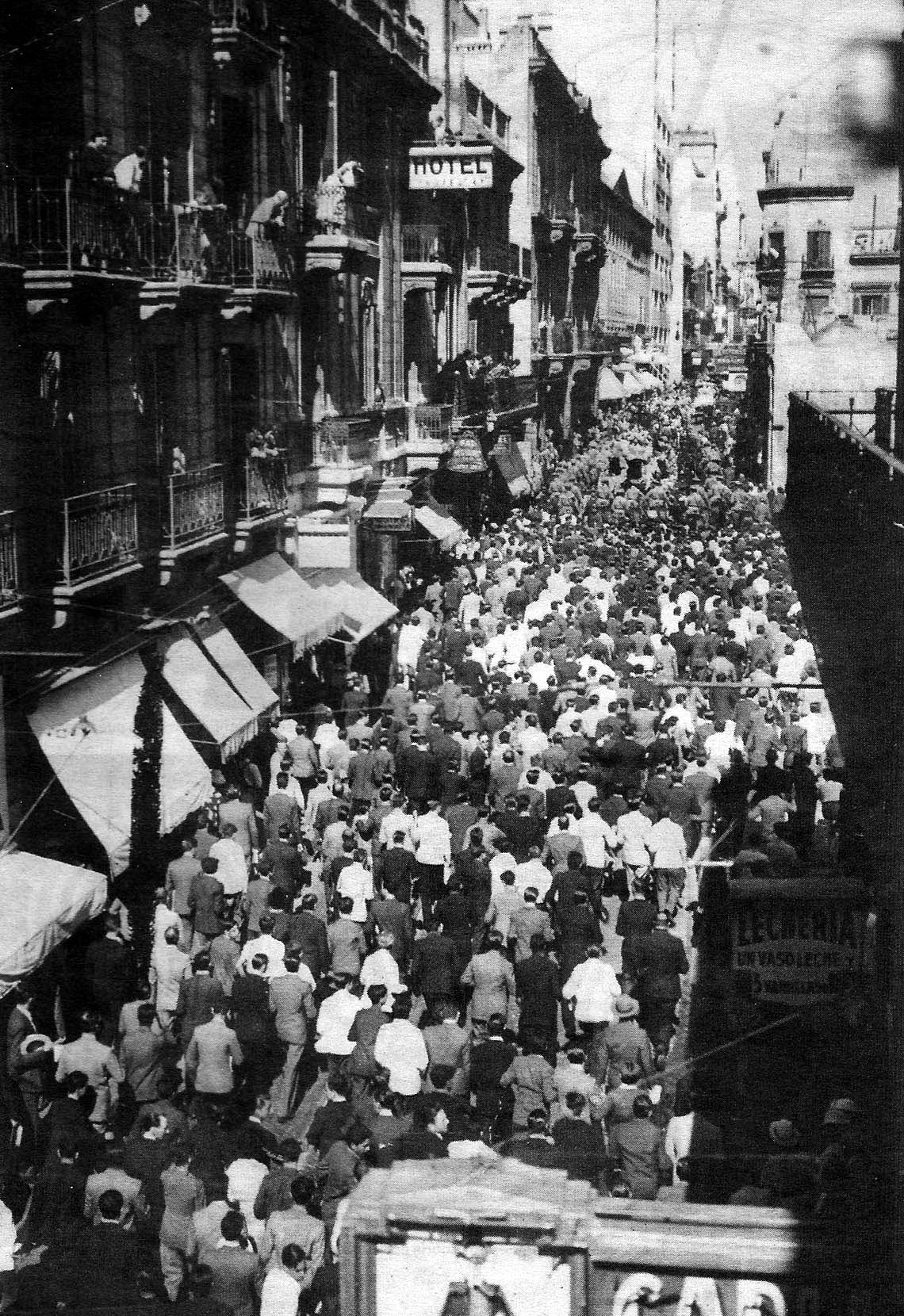
Funeral Procession of Gardel in Buenos Aires

Both aircraft were destroyed in the accident, while all but three of the 20 occupants of the flights were killed. An investigation of the accident revealed that the SACO flight lost control following strong lateral winds in combination with irregularities in the surface of the runway, leading to the left main landing gear leaving the ground before rotation.

A funeral procession was held for Gardel in Buenos Aires and a memorial to him was erected at the airport. The last survivor of the accident died on September 11, 1982.

== See also ==
- Tenerife airport disaster, another instance where two planes collided on the runway.
