= Al Mundo le falta un Tornillo =

Al Mundo le falta un Tornillo (Spanish: The world is missing a screw) is a tango of Argentina composed in 1932 by José María Aguilar Porrás with lyrics by Enrique Cadícamo.

It was recorded by Carlos Gardel for the label Odeon, and one of the most accepted version is that of Julio Sosa, recorded in 1957 for RCA Victor with Armando Portier's orchestra.

The verses refer to the crisis of the 1930, with an early form of protest song and the inevitable appeal to the lunfardo.
