= Argentina–Portugal relations =

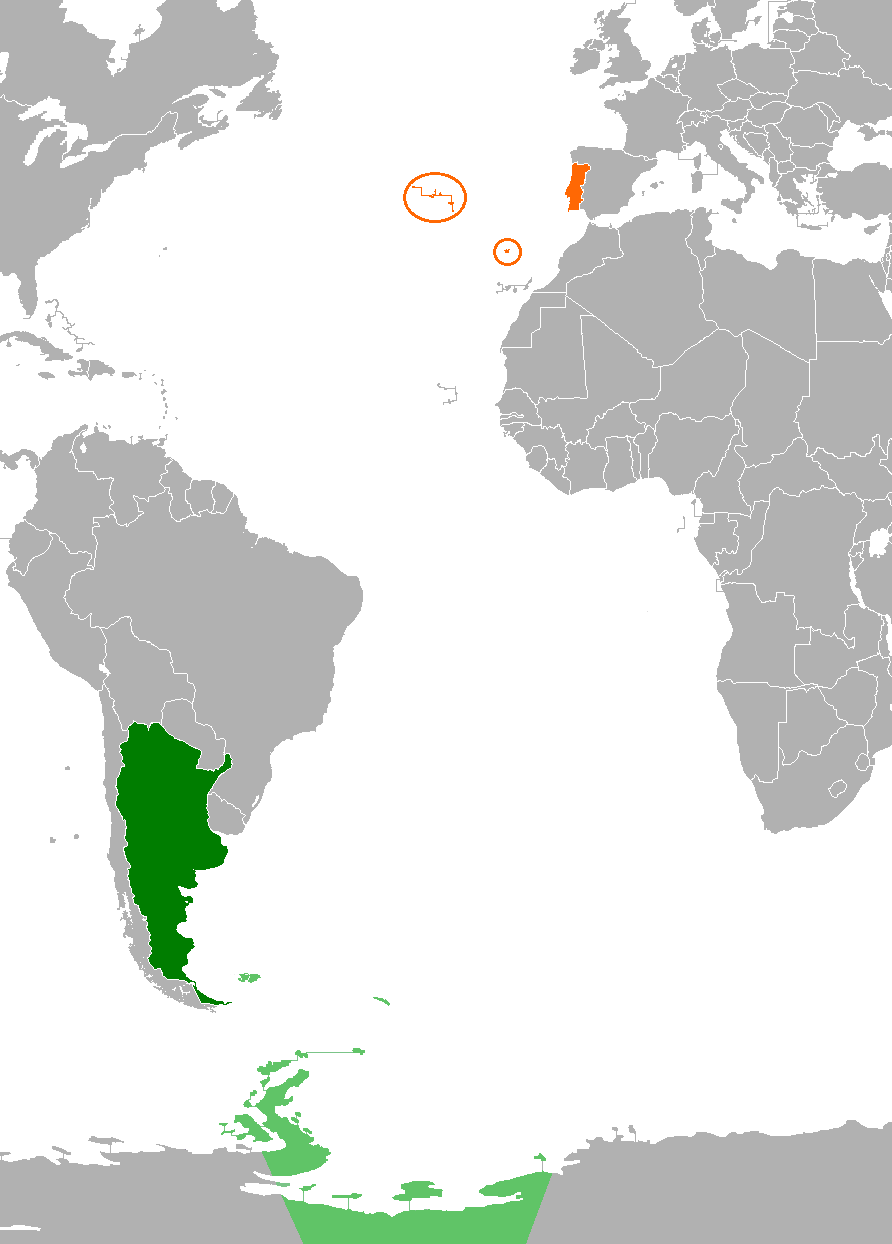
- Argentina: Portugal

The current and historical relations between the Argentine Republic and the Portuguese Republic, have existed for over a century. Both nations are members of the Organization of Ibero-American States and the United Nations.

== History ==
In 1512, Portuguese explorer João de Lisboa reached and explored Río de la Plata, and went as far south as the present-day San Matías Gulf in Southern Argentina. Several other Portuguese explorers would sail along the Rio de la Plata and would encounter other parts of present-day Argentina. In July 1816, the Portuguese Government based in Rio de Janeiro, Brazil became the first country to recognize the independence of Argentina from Spain. In August 1852, a Treaty of Friendship, Trade and Navigation was signed between Argentina and Portugal. Soon afterwards, Portuguese migrants arrived and settled in Argentina, however, Argentina never received a large number of Portuguese migrants as most preferred to immigrate to Brazil which is a Portuguese-speaking nation.

On 23 October 1910, Argentina recognized the Portuguese Republic, soon after the start of the Portuguese Revolution. In June 1947, the First Lady of Argentina, Eva Perón, paid a visit to Portugal as part of her Rainbow Tour. In July 1997, Portuguese Prime Minister, António Guterres, paid an official visit to Argentina, becoming the first Portuguese head-of-state to do so. In October 1998, Argentine President, Carlos Menem, paid a visit to Portugal to attend the 8th Ibero-American Summit in Porto. There have been several high-level visits between leaders of both nations since the initial visits.

In 2019, the European Union (which includes Portugal) and Mercosur (which includes Argentina) finalized a free trade agreement. In December 2019, Portuguese Foreign Minister, Augusto Santos Silva, paid a visit to Argentina to attend the inauguration for President Alberto Fernández.

== High-level visits ==
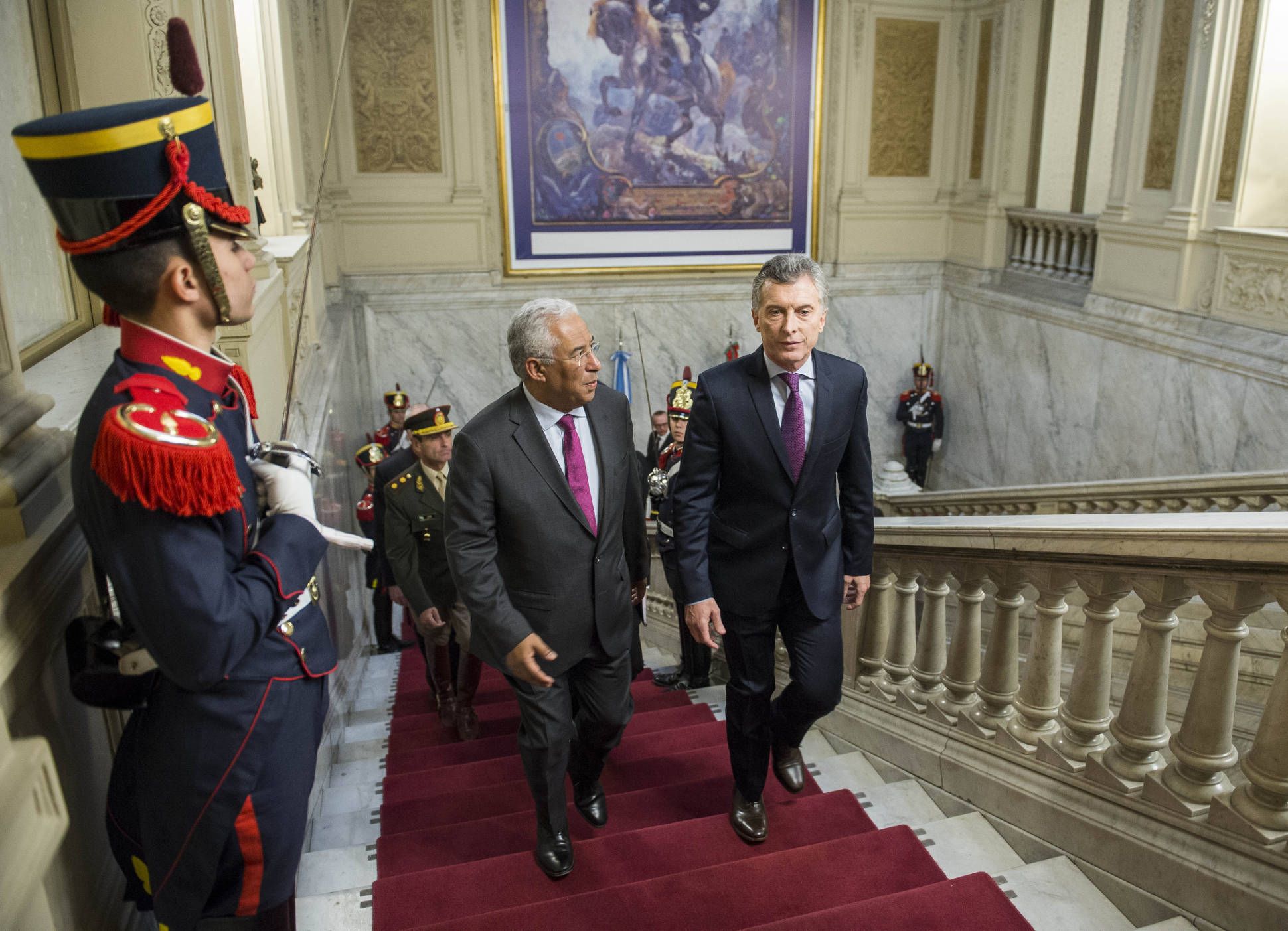
Argentine President Mauricio Macri with Portuguese Prime Minister António Costa in Buenos Aires; June 2017.

High-level visits from Argentina to Portugal

- First Lady Eva Perón (1947)
- President Raúl Alfonsín (1986)
- President Carlos Menem (1998)
- President Cristina Fernández de Kirchner (2009)
- Foreign Minister Héctor Timerman (2015)

High-level visits from Portugal to Argentina

- President Mário Soares (1995)
- Prime Minister António Guterres (1997)
- Prime Minister José Sócrates (2010)
- Prime Minister António Costa (2017)
- Foreign Minister Augusto Santos Silva (2019)

== Bilateral agreements ==
Both nations have signed several bilateral agreements such as a Treaty of Friendship, Trade and Navigation; Agreement for Trade, Economic and Technical Cooperation; Agreement on the Promotion and Reciprocal Protection of Investments; Agreement of Cooperation in the Prevention of Illicit Trafficking of Narcotic Drugs and Psychotropic Substances; Agreement on Tourism Cooperation; Agreement on the Exercise of Remunerated Activities by dependents of members of the diplomatic, consular, administrative and technical staff; Agreement for Scientific and Technological Cooperation; Agreement in Criminal Matters and Mutual Judicial Aid; Memorandum of Understanding between the Portuguese Ministry of National Defense and the Argentine Ministry of Defense; Memorandum of Understanding between the Portuguese Ministry of Foreign Business and the Argentine Ministry of Foreign Affairs on Political Consultations; Memorandum of Understanding between the Portuguese Ministry of Environment, Territorial Planning and Regional Development and the Argentine Secretary of Environment and Development of the Ministry of Health and Environment in the area of Alterations; Agreement on air transportation; Extradition Treaty; Memorandum of Understanding between the Portuguese Ministry of Justice and the Argentine Ministry of Justice; Memorandum of Understanding between the Portuguese Ministry of Education and Science and the Argentine Ministry of Science and Technology in the domain of Scientific and Technological Cooperation; Agreement on Social Security; and an Agreement of Cultural Cooperation.

== Resident diplomatic missions ==
- Argentina has an embassy in Lisbon.
- Portugal has an embassy in Buenos Aires.
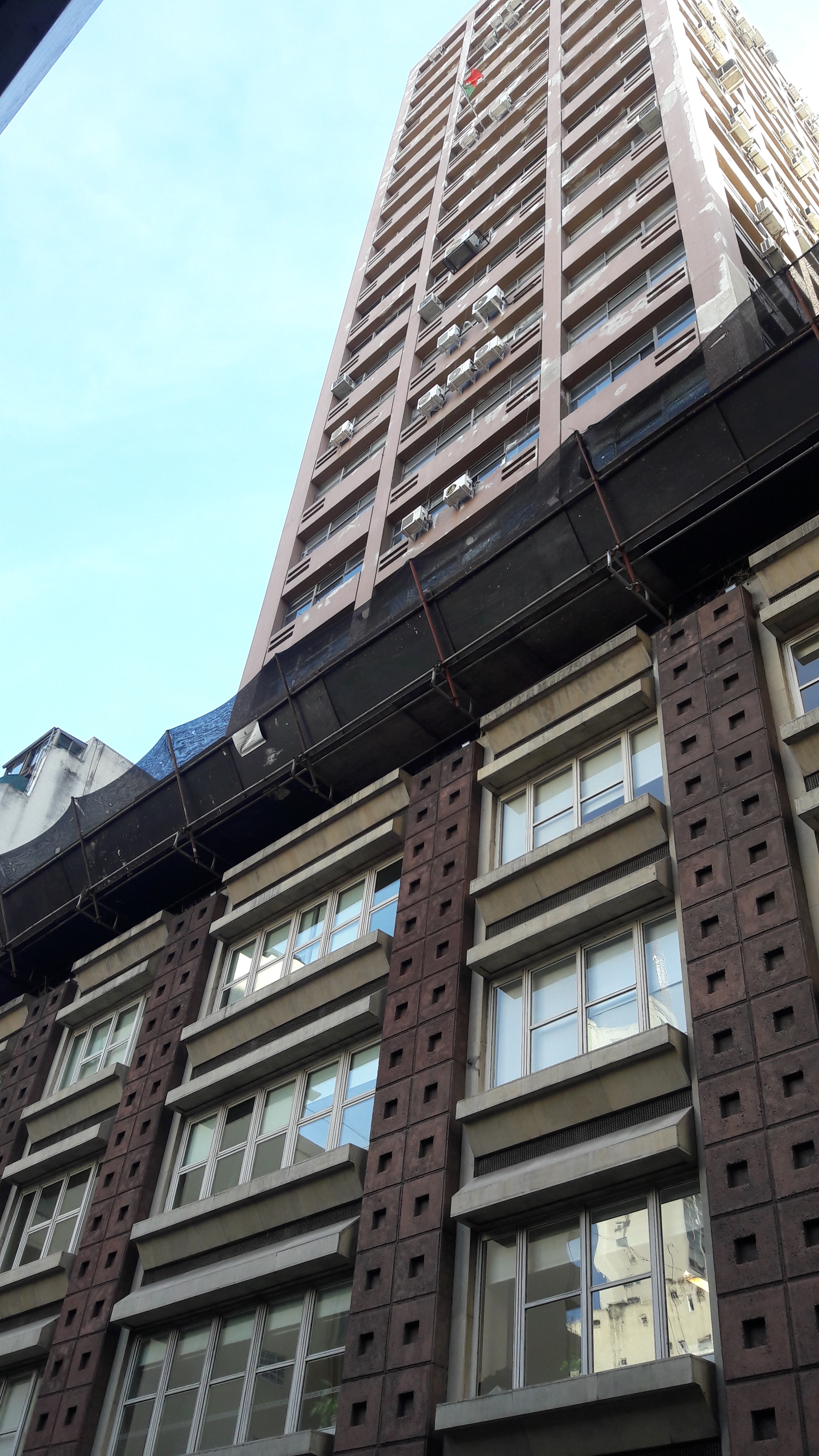
Embassy of Portugal in Buenos Aires

== See also ==
- Foreign relations of Argentina
- Foreign relations of Portugal
- European Union–Mercosur free trade agreement
- Portuguese Argentine
