= Colombia during World War II =

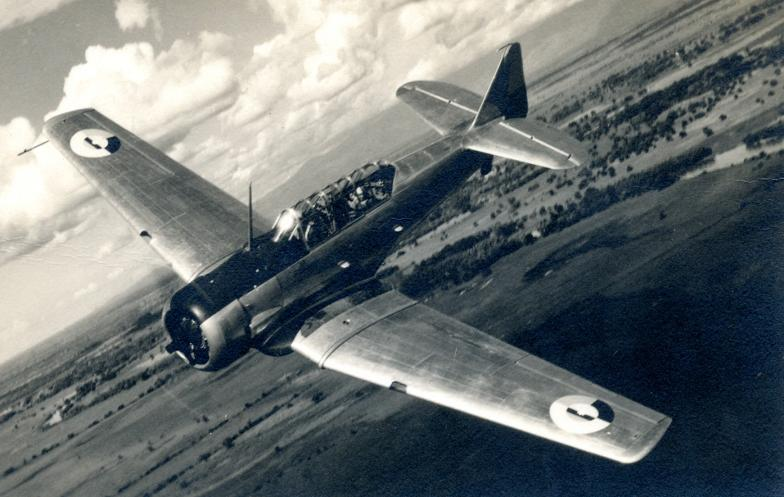
- A Colombian AT-6 Texan in 1940
- Location: Republic of Colombia
- Date: 1939–1945
- Casualties: ~23 killed
- Events: Severing of relations – December 1941; The Roamar Incident – July 21, 1942; Declaration of war – November 26, 1943; The U-154 Incident – March 29, 1944; The Pasto Coup – July 1944

The history of Colombia during World War II began in 1939. Although geographically distant from the main theaters of war, Colombia played an important role in World War II because of its strategic location near the Panama Canal, and its access to both the Atlantic and Pacific Oceans. Colombia also experienced major changes to its military and society, due to increased influence from the United States, but it was also able to maintain its sovereignty throughout the war, as well as avoid sending troops into battle.

Colombia ceased diplomatic relations with the Axis powers in December 1941, after the Japanese attack on Pearl Harbor; it allowed the U.S. to station troops in the country and finally entered the war on the Allies' side on November 26, 1943, after a series of German U-boat attacks on Colombian ships. Despite the declaration, Colombia did not send an army overseas, but its navy was active in countering U-boat operations in the Caribbean.

== History ==
=== Economics ===
The economic dislocation created by World War II impacted Colombia significantly. Firstly, Colombia was cut off from European and Asian markets, leaving the United States as its primary market for exports. Secondly, Colombia's imports were also dramatically affected, and again the United States was the sole source of many goods, such as rayon yarn, steel, machinery, graphite, and lead.

One of the primary concerns was the price of coffee, Colombia's largest export and the main source of its foreign exchange. The American Office of Price Administration (OPA) attempted to have the maximum price of coffee frozen at the level existing on December 8, 1941, the day after the attack on Pearl Harbor. However, Colombia objected on the basis that the cost of producing and transporting coffee had increased due to wartime conditions, and, if the price was not adjusted to factor in these conditions, the economy would decline. The OPA relented, and agreed to raise prices immediately and to adjust them in the future based on increased production and transportation costs.

Colombia's source of platinum was another important issue. Colombia was the only source of platinum for the German and Japanese war industries, and the United States moved quickly to buy out the entire supply through the Metals Reserve Company, which was an agency of the Reconstruction Finance Corporation. Since the United States also needed additional supplies of platinum for its war effort, it assisted Colombia with technical advice on increasing production through the Foreign Economic Administration.

Because platinum was so valuable, even in small amounts, and Axis agents were willing to pay premium prices, smuggling became a problem. Accordingly, Colombia attempted to control the export of platinum by requiring all producers to sell their product to the Central Bank only. However, producers in remote areas were able to circumvent government control by selling their product on the black market in Argentina. The smuggling of platinum out of Colombia remained a problem for most of the war, but it was reduced to a "trickle" by late 1944.

=== Immigrants from Axis countries ===
At the beginning of the war, Colombia was home to a German colony - estimated by the United States government in December 1941 to consist of about 4,000 people - and a small village of Japanese farmers in Cauca. The Americans were concerned about the possibility of a "fifth column" of subversives forming in Colombia and carrying out sabotage and the like against the nearby Panama Canal Zone. However, this view, in most instances, was not shared by the Colombian government. To be sure, there were some Axis agitators, such as the businessman Emil Prufert in Barranquilla, but the Colombian government was not convinced that all immigrants from Axis countries were enemy agents.

Even though the Colombian government was mostly in doubt about the presence of enemy agents operating in their country, the United States through Lend-Lease was providing the former with economic assistance to counter enemy agent activity, and constantly had to remind the Colombian government that the aid would be cut off if it did not acknowledge the threat. The benefits of American economic assistance, and threats to cut it off, were irresistible, however, and as a result, Colombia monitored, interned, or deported hundreds of people from Germany, Japan, and Italy, during the war.

==== The Black List ====
After the Attack on Pearl Harbor, the Colombian government expressed strong support for the United States. As a result, Japanese, German, and Italian property was confiscated, internment camps were established, and laws were emplaced to deter Axis espionage. The American Government collaborated with the Colombian Government to create a "Black List" to prevent the financial aid of the United States from falling into potential Axis spies and collaborators. In 1943, the Colombian government also issued a decree that prohibited the German language from being used in public places.

In 1944, the largest internment camp was established in a hotel named Hotel Sabaneta de Fusagasugá in Cundinamarca. It held 150 Germans, Japanese, and Italians and was an extension of the "Black List" initiative. It forcibly displaced German, Japanese, and Italian immigrants escaping the war as well as immigrants who had come before the war. Once possible conspirators were sent to the hotel, their property was confiscated and they were required to pay for their stay at the hotel. They were described to be more pleasant living conditions than that of the victims of Nazism. Soon after the war, families were economically compensated for the loss of property.

Directly after the Colombian severing of ties with Japan because of Pearl Harbor, Colombian ambassador to Japan, Hisao Yanai, was flown out of Japan back to Colombia but continued his relations with the country. He sought to assist the Japanese subjects in Colombia as he saw the situation arising poorly for them. As a result, he cooperated with Spain as it was the closest nation to Japan that was not in the Axis Powers. What came to be was the expulsion of multiple Japanese diplomats back to their country of origin. This was because there was little need for Japanese diplomats after the severing of diplomatic relations. In return, many diplomats from the American continent were also returned to their home countries.

==== SCADTA ====
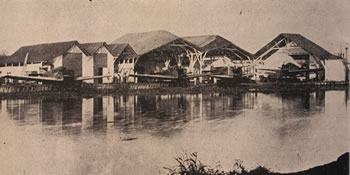
SCADTA hangars

One example of American pressure to "crack down" on immigrants from Axis countries was the SCADTA case. SCADTA was founded in 1919 by three German settlers and five Colombians, and by World War II was an important part of the transportation network of Colombia. In 1931, after the American-owned Pan American World Airways acquired a controlling interest in SCADTA, it was discovered that many of the airline's pilots, technicians, and key administrators were German or Austrian, even though most had lived in Colombia for several years. Some of the pilots had even retained reserve commissions in the Luftwaffe. The United States was afraid that the SCADTA pilots were engaged in espionage, and could be plotting to convert civilian aircraft into bombers, in order to attack the Panama Canal.

The Colombian government was not concerned about SCADTA, though, and did not question the loyalty of the German pilots. However, in order to comply with the United States, Colombia passed laws requiring airlines to hire more Colombian citizens, and for 51% of the stock of these companies to be Colombian-held. Restrictions were also placed on German pilots on how they could be utilized by an airline. For example, at least one pilot on every plane had to be Colombian, and positioning devices were placed on all of SCADTA's planes so that the government could monitor their location.

=== Military forces of Colombia ===
In 1939, the average numerical strength of the Colombian Army stood at 16,000 men. It was made up of six mixed brigades, with each mixed brigade consisting of three battalions, one cavalry group of three squadrons, one artillery group of three batteries, one engineer battalion, and two service battalions. The army's air force component consisted of one service squadron and one training squadron of fifteen aircraft. The police numbered 5,053 officers, and by 1944 the number had increased to 5,500. Colombia nominally had a compulsory military service but it was never fully enforced. Active service lasted for a period of one year.

In 1939, the Colombian Navy had a total of approximately 1,850 personnel, including naval infantry. It possessed two modern destroyers, both of which had been purchased in Portugal, four river gunboats, one seagoing gunboat, three coastguard patrol vessels, and several customs service motor launches. In the 1930s, the Colombian Air Force was only in initial stages of development; in 1935 the very first flight was created, but it was only during World War II that shipments of aircraft from the United States allowed for a more significant development of the air force, eventually transforming it into a separate branch of the armed forces. Three air force groups were formed in 1943.

Cooperation with the United States

Close cooperation between the United States military and the Military Forces of Colombia began during World War II. Prior to the beginning of the war in 1939, Switzerland and the United Kingdom provided Colombia with military aviation and naval support. However, the Swiss aviation equipment was expensive and obsolete by 1939, and the Colombian government recognized the possibility that the British would most likely not be able to continue their naval assistance due to their own defense needs.

Conveniently, American naval and military aviation missions arrived in Colombia in January 1939. The United States and Colombia also began a series of consultations on the defense of the Panama Canal. After the Fall of France in 1940, the need for cooperation became more urgent. In September, the two countries began to work out agreements for a military alliance. Colombia agreed to prevent any attack on the Panama Canal or the United States from its territory, and if Colombia came under attack by a non-American power, the United States would respond accordingly, but only if requested by the Colombian government. If the United States supported another American republic in time of war, as result of an inter-American agreement, Colombia would allow the United States use of its military facilities.

Other points of the agreement included the exchange of technical advisers, cooperation on coastal patrols, and the aerial photographing of strategic areas within Colombia. On the issue of aerial photography, Colombia made it clear that it would only be accomplished by Colombian aircraft and American cameramen. Colombia also made it clear that, although it was fully supportive of the fight against the Axis, it would do everything possible to limit the amount of American military activity taking place on or from its territory. The Colombians did not invite the United States to build its own military bases within their country, as Ecuador and other South American countries did. They felt that the defense of Colombia should be carried out by Colombians, and the United States did not object.

As result of the alliance, Colombia was able to modernize both its military and society at large. In addition to the naval and aviation missions established in the early years of the war, Colombia later participated in the Lend-Lease program. On March 17, 1942, Colombia and the United States signed an agreement that granted the former $16.5 million in military assistance. The terms of the agreement were most favorable, because Colombia was able to purchase military equipment at half the regular cost, and also did not have to pay interest on its purchases. Other favorable loans and grants soon followed. For example, the Export-Import Bank provided $20 million for highway construction, $10.3 million for agricultural programs, and another $3.5 million to build a hydroelectric plant. It also issued a loan for low-cost housing construction. In addition, American private investment soared to more than $200 million by 1943.

=== Battle of the Caribbean ===
Attacks on Colombian ships

German U-boats sank at least four Colombian ships during World War II, all of which were small sailing vessels. The first victim was the SS Resolute, a 35-ton schooner with a crew of ten men. On June 23, 1942, the Resolute was stopped near San Andres and Old Providence by 20-mm gunfire from the German submarine U-172. Shortly thereafter, the Colombians abandoned ship, and the Germans boarded to sink the little schooner with hand grenades. Six of the Colombians were killed as result, and the four survivors claimed that the Germans shot at them with machine guns before sailing away.

The SS Roamar was the next to be sunk. A 110-ton schooner, the Roamar belonged to a Colombian diplomat, and her sinking off San Andres by U-505 on July 21, 1942, gave Colombia the political grounds to declare war on Germany. The Germans knew that Colombia was still neutral at this time, so they opted to sink the Roamar quickly, before anybody could find out. Accordingly, the Germans fired only two shots before the ship was reduced to "nothing but splintered debris." U-505's engineer, Hans Goebeler, said the following about the incident: "We couldn't leave the evidence [of attacking a neutral ship] floating around, so we sank her with the deck gun." This was not the last ship sunk by the Germans during Colombia's neutrality period. On the very next day, the U-505 sank the 153-ton Urious in the same area, killing thirteen of the Colombian sailors on board.

Another Colombian ship sunk by the Germans was the SS Ruby, a 39-ton schooner with a complement of eleven men. On the morning of November 18, 1943, Ruby was north of Colón and on course between San Andres and Cartagena, when she was fired on by the deck gun of U-516. Thirty rounds later, the Ruby was sinking, and four men had been killed.

U-154 incident

Colombia's only notable engagement with Axis forces during the war was a brief incident in the Caribbean Sea between the destroyer ARC Caldas and the U-154. On the night of March 29, 1944, at 20:25, a lookout aboard the Caldas sighted a periscope off the portside. After closing the distance, in the darkness the Colombians found U-154 sailing on the surface. The Germans were completely surprised by the sudden appearance of the enemy destroyer, so they were unable to get their deck gun into action in time, and instead had to dive to prevent being hit by Colombian gunfire.

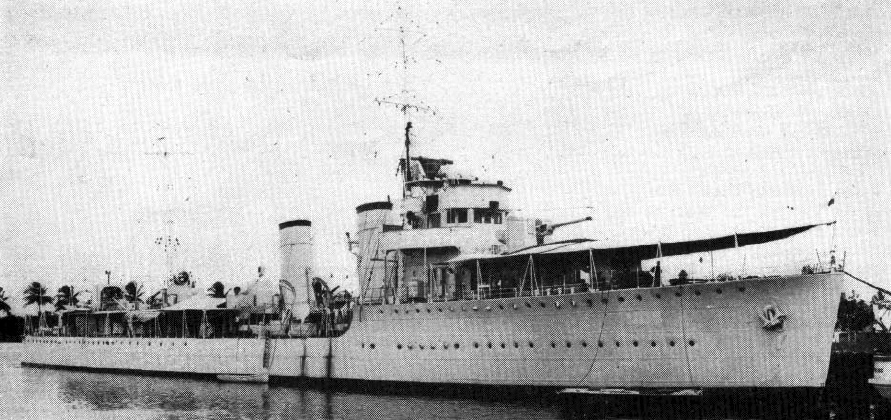
Colombian Navy destroyer ARC Caldas

According to the Colombian Navy's report of the incident, the men aboard Caldas struck the U-boat twice with 105-mm gunfire before it dived, and then finished it off with depth charges. An oil slick and some wreckage were spotted, and it seemed to confirm the sinking. Overall, the engagement lasted no longer than three minutes, and afterward the Caldas sailed back to port, without looking for survivors. When the Caldas arrived back at port at 03:30 the next morning, news of the "victory" had already spread. However, the U-154 escaped without damage. Using spare oil and some damaged torpedo tubes, the Germans were able to fake the oil slick and wreckage the Colombians saw the night before, and slip away unscathed.

Newspapers were quick to produce inaccurate reports of the engagement. An article in TIME, for example, claimed that the sunken submarine was not German, but in fact an American vessel. Others spread news of how the Caldas avenged those who had died aboard the sunken schooners. Ultimately, U-154 met her end off Madeira, on July 3, 1944, when she was sunk with all hands lost by the American destroyer escorts USS Inch and Frost.

== Consequences ==
The consequences that came from the Second World War in Colombia were regularly positive and not negative, similarly to other countries. Despite this there were still many issues that arose economically, politically and socially, but also arose an improvement in the fields of science and large immigration from Europe which assisted the national employment level.

=== Economic ===
Alfonso López Pumarejo, the president of Colombia between 1934 and 1938 and again between 1942 and 1945, created the slogan "The revolution in march" for the plan of government in his administration. This government was characterized by large amount of reforms that occurred in the agrarian and educational sectors. After Pumarejo's first term in 1934-1938, President Eduardo Santos Montejo succeeded him and developed a policy of protection for the national industry as an economic measure to resist the effects caused by the Second World War.

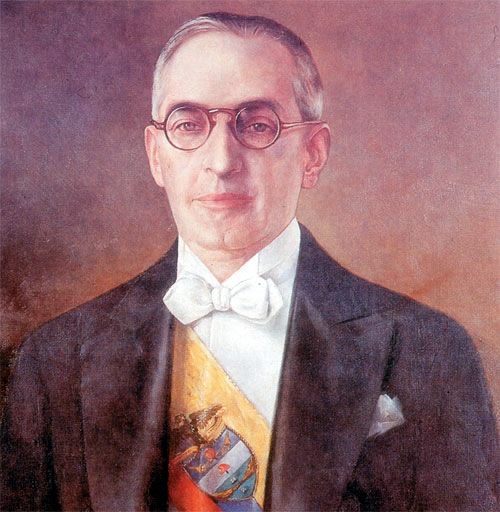
President Alfonso López Pumarejo

During the second administration of Pumarejo, what came was the drop in price of coffee and budgetary imbalance, but also an increase in the prices of imported goods as a result of the Second World War. Fluctuation in prices also became common place as disruptions in trade sometimes stopped the import of consumer goods into the Americas. Despite this, the demand for consumer goods increased around the world when the war ended which helped stimulate the Colombian economy by the large export of coffee and bananas. Colombia's oil reserves also assisted the economy due to the high demand of petroleum during the war.

=== Sociopolitical ===
In the early 1940s, politics in Colombia was highly dictated by the use of violence in bipartisan issues between the Partido Liberal (Liberal Party) and the Partido Conservador (Conservative Party) of Colombia. The administration of President Alfonso López Pumarejo was a regime under the Liberal Party but multiple conservatives violently targeted rural supporters particularly for Pumarejo's agrarian reforms which threatened Colombian oligarchs, a powerful minority of the Conservative Party at the time.

Politics were also heavily divided with many Conservative members supporting cooperation with Axis powers while Liberal members supported cooperation with Allied powers during the war. Far right politics also became more popular in Colombia as the rise in dictatorships and fascist regimes became more widespread in politics around the world. Francoist Spanish collective and corporative economic politics naturally became popular in conservative politics because of Spain's connection to Hispanic America while United States democratic and Keynesian economic politics became more popular in Liberal politics because of the influence the U.S. has on the American continent. All this further polarized Colombian politics.

==== Pasto Coup ====
Soon, the very polar situation came to a head when military officers stationed in the southern Colombian town of Pasto attempted to end Pumarejo's presidency during his observation of military exercises in July 1944. Pumarejo was held hostage, along with cabinet members who accompanied him, but the military refused to support the officers and swiftly arrested Colonel Diogenes Gil, the leader of the coup d'etat which is known as the Pasto Coup. While this showed that the military was still holding up to its mandate to support the government, the coup showed cracks in military solidarity to stand with its duties. Soon after, the Conservative Party gained control of the government in 1946 which eventually resulted in a large period of civil unrest known as "La Violencia."

=== Military ===
The number of military personnel of Colombia increased slightly during the Second World War, involving military officers and reserve troops. The Fuerza Aérea Colombiana (Colombian Air Force) was officially established in December 1944; however, the separation of aviation and the army had begun in 1942.

== See also ==
- American Theater (1939-1945)
- Alfonso López Pumarejo
- Battle of the Caribbean
- La Violencia
- Operation Bolivar
- SCADTA
