= Rosita Quiroga =

Argentine singer, lyricist and composer

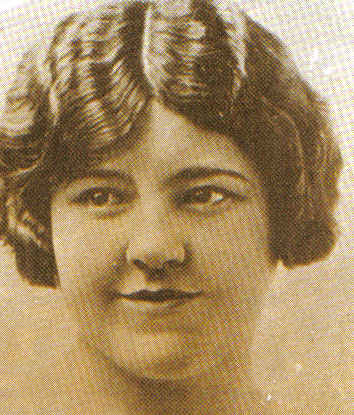
Rosita Quiroga

Rosa Rodríguez Quiroga de Capiello (January 16, 1896 in Buenos Aires – October 16, 1984), better known as Rosita Quiroga, was an Argentine singer, lyricist and composer. She was the first woman tango singer from the poorer side of Buenos Aires, but is remembered primarily for performing the first song recorded in Argentina, La musa mistonga.

== Biography ==
Quiroga was born 16 January 1896, or 13 January 1899, in 1901, or 16 January 1901. A leading tango singer after 1920, her style, known as canyengue reflected on the less affluent side of the city. She recorded her first album in 1923, entitled Siempre criolla. In that same year, Quiroga was the first women to debut on Argentine radio, with other women followed thereafter, including Azucena Maizani, Libertad Lamarque, and Sofia Bozan. RCA Victor was her sponsor when she became a radio host. Her first tango was La tipa with guitarist Enrique Maciel and lyrics by Enrique Pedro Maroni. Early in her career she formed a duo with Rosita del Carril. She learned to play the guitar with Juan de Dios Filiberto. Quiroga and RCA Victor began creating recordings in Argentina in 1926. In 1930, she worked at the Empire theater, and in the following year, she recorded four songs, thereafter appearing sporadically on radio. In 1938, she was the first performer to be heard in Japan. She recorded again in March 1952. In 1970, she traveled to Osaka, Japan by invitation from a tango association which bears her name. She is credited in a 1976 film, El Canto cuenta su historia. Quiroga retired a few days before her death in 1984 at the age of 88.
