= Angola–Cape Verde relations =

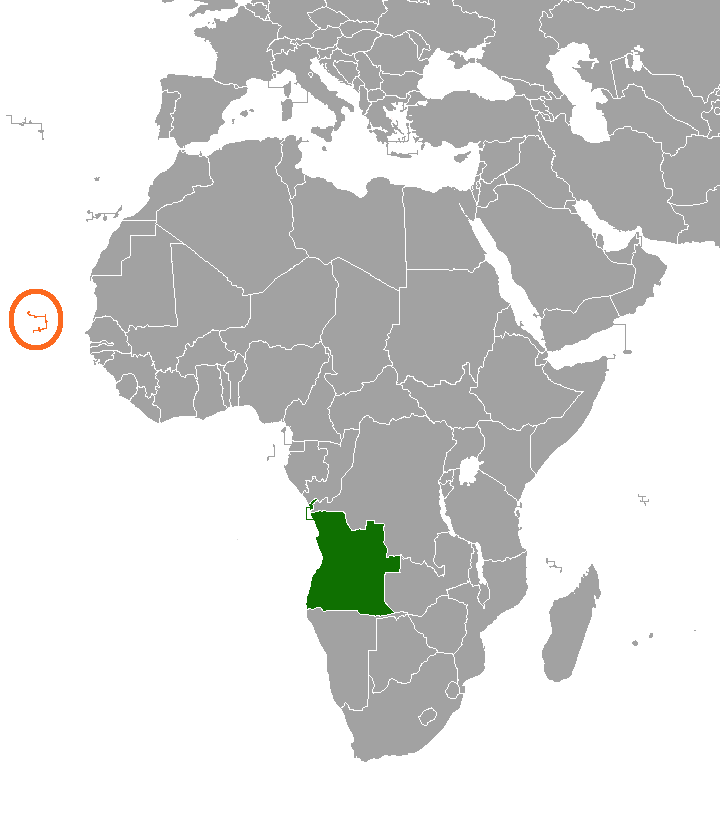

- Angola: Cape Verde

Angola and Cape Verde are members of the African Union, Community of Portuguese Language Countries, Group of 77 and the United Nations.

== History ==
Both Angola and Cape Verde were united for four hundred years as part of the Portuguese Empire. In 1914, the first recorded immigrants from Cape Verde to Angola . In the 1940s, Cape Verde suffered a devastating cycle of droughts and famines that killed almost half of the population of the then colony. Due to these conditions, the first great wave of emigration to Angola occurred.

In July 1975, Cape Verde obtained its independence from Portugal and four months later, in November 1975, Angola also obtained its independence. Soon afterwards, both nations established diplomatic relations.

Soon after Angola's independence, Angola entered into a civil war. After the South African invasion of Angola as part of the South African Border War; Cape Verde created an air corridor that allowed Cuban forces to travel from the Island of Sal to Luanda in the name of solidarity with Angola.

Both nations work closely within the Portuguese language community. There have been several visits between leaders of both nations. In June 2021, Angolan President João Lourenço paid an official visit to Cape Verde.

== Bilateral agreements ==
Both nations have signed several bilateral agreements such as an Extradition Treaty (2010); Agreement on Defence Cooperation (2013); Agreement on visas exemption for ordinary passports for citizens of both countries (2018); Agreement to Avoid Double Taxation (2019); Agreement on Tourism (2019); and an Agreement for the Reciprocal Promotion and Protection of Investments (2020).

== Transportation ==
There are direct flights between both nations with Cabo Verde Airlines and TAAG Angola Airlines.

== Resident diplomatic missions ==
- Angola has an embassy in Praia.
- Cape Verde has an embassy in Luanda and a consulate in Benguela.

== See also ==
- Cape Verdean Angolan
- Lusofonia Games
- Portuguese-speaking African countries
