= Portuguese Argentines =

Ethnic group in Argentina

Português-argentinos (Portuguese) Luso-argentinos (Spanish)
- (Argentina) (Portugal)
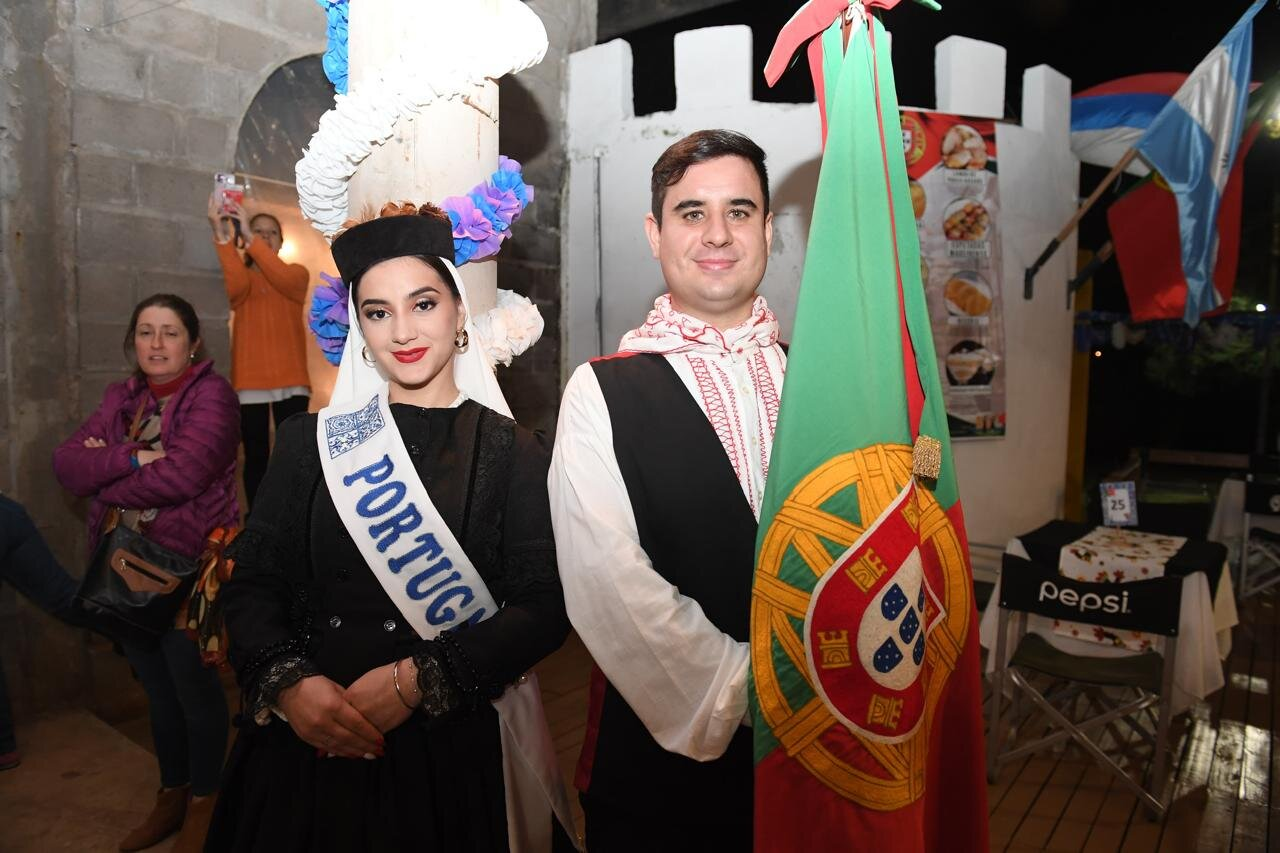
- Portuguese Argentines during the Immigrant's Festival in Oberá, Misiones

Total population
- Unknown (by birth)

Regions with significant populations
- Predominantly in the Pampas, Mendoza, Misiones and Chubut

Languages
- Spanish · Portuguese

Religion
- Majority: Catholicism; Minority: Irreligion

Related ethnic groups
- Portuguese; Portuguese Uruguayans · Portuguese Brazilians · Portuguese Venezuelans

Portuguese Argentines are Argentines of Portuguese descent or a Portugal-born person who resides in Argentina. Portuguese Argentines are one of the biggest Portuguese communities in the world.

During the great European immigration wave period, more than 100,000 Portuguese arrived in Argentina. Currently, 14,946 people in Argentina hold Portuguese citizenship.

== History ==
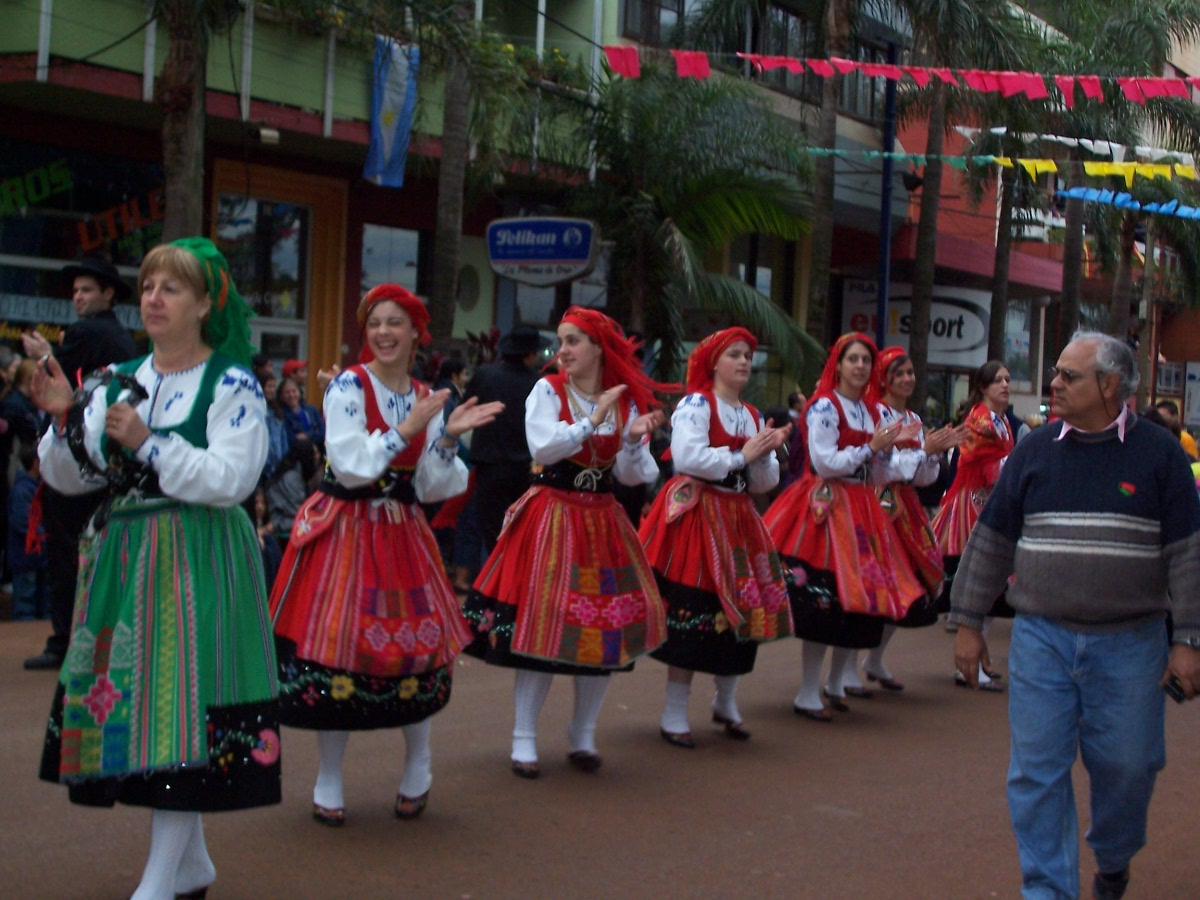
The Portuguese community of Rosario, Santa Fe, at the XXXIV Immigrant's Festival.

Portuguese immigration has been comparatively small in Argentina due to a linguistic preference for neighbouring Brazil. However, the Portuguese were the largest foreign group in the last years of the Viceroyalty. In 1850, there were sailors and petty traders from Lisbon and Porto; they were later joined by artisans, laborers, and farm workers. The Portuguese Club, in the neighborhood of Isidro Casanova, recognizes the origins of the migration of a group of families during the military dictatorship of Antonio Oliveira Salazar (1932–1974) installed as quinteros, hornero and merchants in the metropolitan area, notably in La Matanza party.

The Portuguese were after the Spanish the largest group before 1816 and continued arriving throughout the 19th century. A large proportion settled in the interior of the country, but Buenos Aires City and Province were the main places of settlement. There already were many men who arrived in Lisbon, Porto, and coastal regions of Portugal, which focused particularly on the parishes of South by deploying multiple occupations, but mainly the naval: sailors, stevedores, and porters. In the 1970s, they began organizing themselves ethnically, and community life (mutual, club, newspaper) would be more active in the following decades. To Salliqueló came an important group from a settlement of 1905.

Prior to 1975, Cape Verdean immigrants were registered as Portuguese immigrants from the overseas province of Portuguese Cape Verde.

== Demography ==
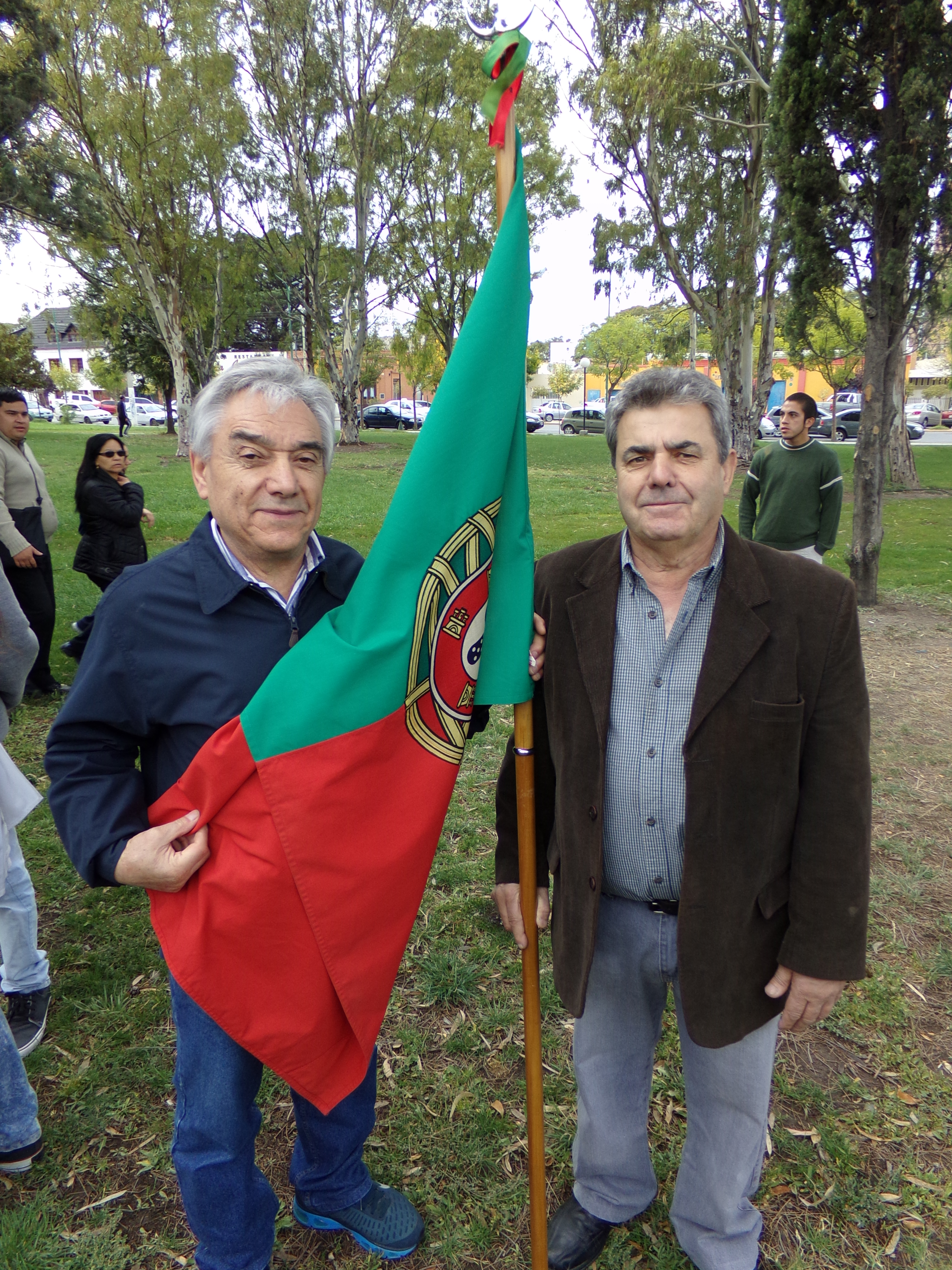
Two Portuguese Argentines holding a Portuguese flag in Trelew, Chubut Province.

An important Portuguese community was established in Buenos Aires. Have also been established in Greater Buenos Aires (in the south, in Villa Elisa, La Plata, Ezeiza and in Esteban Echeverría Partido) and also in the West: Isidro Casanova, González Catán (La Matanza Partido), Pontevedra, Libertad and Olavarría. In addition, communities in Comodoro Rivadavia, Mendoza and Oberá (where the community has a ballet called Corazón Luso - in English: Luso Heart).

== Portuguese Clubs ==
Around the 1970s started based on La Matanza clubs of the foreign communities likely as a form of defense against the threat of the loss of the important elements of culture itself.

The members of the Portuguese community participated in this process of creating of an area of cultural heritage. There are 23 Portuguese clubs that exist in Argentina and Isidro Casanova, one of the most important in this country, was founded in 1978. Subsequently, the creation of another club, smaller than the previous one, took place in the city of González Catán, maintaining a constant interplay.

It could explain this rise in the Portuguese community to create clubs as a response to the threat felt by the first immigrants at the loss of their language, customs, and values and who therefore try to keep them alive in the area of the club.

It should not be forgotten that for the seventies these immigrants had Portuguese or Argentina children monolingual in Portuguese attending Argentine schools where taught them the Spanish and the parents saw and felt was lost their mother tongue. In communities such as the described each generation begins with a restrictive monolingual repertoire to the intimacy of the home and the educational institutions become bilingual and provide a wider repertoire. Bilingual subjects appear this way.

== See also ==
- Argentina–Portugal relations
- Argentines of European descent
- Spanish Argentines
