= Cape Verdeans in Senegal =

Total population
- 25,000 (1995)

Regions with significant populations
- Dakar

Languages
- French, Cape Verdean Creole, Portuguese language

Religion
- Roman Catholicism

Related ethnic groups
- Cape Verdean diaspora

There were estimated to be 25,000 Cape Verdeans in Senegal as of 1995.

== Migration history ==
Senegal became popular as a destination for Cape Verdean migrants in the 1920s, as immigration to the United States became more difficult as a result of the Emergency Quota Act of 1921 and then the Immigration Act of 1924. The United States had previously functioned as an escape route for Cape Verdeans who hoped to avoid coerced migration to other Portuguese colonies such as São Tomé and Príncipe or Angola. Portuguese authorities often refused to issue passports or travel permits for other destinations; however, Senegal's proximity to Cape Verde allowed emigrants to travel there in a clandestine fashion. Women typically pursued domestic work in the homes of French colonists, while the men were employed as artisans. The flow of Cape Verdean emigrants to Dakar continued until the 1950s. When Senegal achieved independence in 1960, some Cape Verdeans followed their French colonist employers to France, augmenting the numbers of Cape Verdeans already found in France in cities such as Paris, Versailles, and Nice. However, many others chose to remain in Senegal.

There are roughly 300 people among the Cape Verdean community in Senegal who have migrated back to the land of their ancestors. Most completed their education in Senegal, but then, unable to find suitable work in the country of their birth, came to Cape Verde for work as teachers or in the health field. However, few Cape Verdean parents in Senegal have followed their children back to Cape Verde.

== Notable people ==
- José Brito, Cape Verdean Minister of Foreign Affairs
- Maria de Barros, Cape Verdean American singer, born in Senegal
- Patrick Vieira, born in Senegal, former international association football player for France.
- Patrice Evra, born in Senegal, international association football player for France.
- Xane D'Almeida, born in France, international basketball player for Senegal.
