= Héctor Pedro Blomberg =

Argentine poet and songwriter

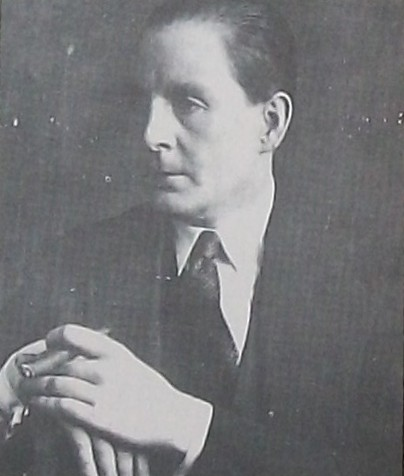
- Born: 1889
- Died: 1955
- Occupation(s): Poet, songwriter

Héctor Pedro Blomberg (1889–1955) was an Argentine poet and songwriter.
