= Enrique Maciel =

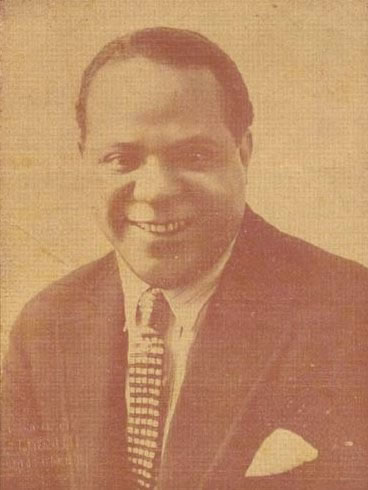
Enrique Maciel

Enrique Maciel (July 13, 1897 – January 24, 1962) was an Argentinian composer, lyricist, and harmonium, piano, bandoneon and guitar performer. The latter is the instrument that identified him permanently in the memory of tango listeners.

== Life and work ==
Born to an Afro-Argentine family (most likely a descendant of West African peoples) in Buenos Aires, in 1897, Maciel received his early musical instruction in a local parochial school, and his first professional performance was in 1915. His first tango, "Presentación," remains unpublished. He joined small groups acting in houses and dance halls, touring the provinces. Among his peers, he was closest to bandoneonist Ángel Danesi.

In 1920, in Bragado, he met the poet Enrique Maroni and immediately released their collaboration with the tango "La tipa," leading to recording three years later by Rosita Quiroga. A year later, Maciel became a contractual guitarist with RCA-Victor, where he accompanied the Chilean duo Glos-Balmaceda. There, he met José María Aguilar, with whom he made recordings in a guitar duo, accompanied by fellow RCA artists. Maciel's skill as a pianist earned him the tripling of an otherwise modest salary. His first new tango under this arrangement was "Grief" - performed by Osvaldo Fresedo and Rosita Quiroga (on harmonium).

In 1925, the pianist Carlos Geroni Flores presented Ignacio Corsini to Maciel, who was incorporated into his popular group as a guitarist and pianist. Corsini's performances alongside Maciel continued until 1943, and their companions included José Aguilar on guitar and Rosendo Weight; Aguilar left the set in 1928 and joined Armando Pagés.

The group became popular on Argentine radio, particularly on Radio Buenos Aires. They gradually fell out of favor with listeners, however, and the group disbanded during the 1950s.
