= Cape Verdean Angolan =

Cape Verdean Angolan are Angolan residents whose ancestry originated in Cape Verde.

In 1995, it was estimated that there were 10,000 people of Cape Verdean descent in Angola.

== See also ==
- Angola–Cape Verde relations
