= SACO (Colombia) =

Airline in Colombia

SACO (Servicio Aéreo Colombiano)
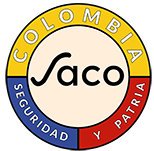
IATA	ICAO	Call sign
-	-	SACO
- Founded: June 15, 1933
- Commenced operations: June 27, 1933
- Ceased operations: June 14, 1940 (merged with SCADTA to form Avianca)
- Alliance: Pan Am
- Headquarters: Bogotá, Colombia

The Colombian Air Service (Spanish: Servicio Aéreo Colombiano, SACO), was an early Colombian airline. Founded in 1933, in 1940 SACO merged with the Colombo-German Air Transport Company (Sociedad Colombo-Alemana de Transportes Aéreos, or SCADTA); the new company was named Avianca (Aerovías Nacionales de Colombia). Avianca still operates to this day, and claims SCADTA's history as its own, thus making it one of the oldest airlines in the world.

== History ==
During the Hoover Administration, American governors feared that European-owned airlines were violating the Monroe Doctrine (especially SCADTA), so in order to replace SCADTA, they hired Ernesto Samper to create a new airline. On 23 June 1934, Samper arrived in Bogotá with three Curtiss Kingbirds and four American aviators hired to operate them. With these aircraft, the SACO expanded its operations to other cities—Bucaramanga, Cartago, Montería, and Cartagena.

== Accidents and incidents ==
On June 24, 1935, a Ford Trimotor of SACO collided during take off with another Ford Trimotor of SCADTA at Medellín, Colombia. 15 people were killed, including the world-famous tango singer Carlos Gardel. After the accident, the SACO airline stopped operating for some time, while it was reorganized and new aircraft were acquired.

== See also ==
- 1935 in aviation
- List of defunct airlines of Colombia
