= Cape Verdeans in Italy =

Total population
- Various estimates: 3,000 to 10,000

Regions with significant populations
- Lazio · Campania · Emilia-Romagna

Languages
- Italian · Portuguese · Cape Verdean Creole

Religion
- Roman Catholicism

The presence of Cape Verdeans in Italy dates back to the 1960s.

== Numbers ==
There are various conflicting data about the size of the Cape Verdean population. The 2001 Italian census found 3,263 residents of Italy born in Cape Verde, 628 of whom held Italian citizenship. In contrast, the Caboverde Informatics Project of the University of Massachusetts Dartmouth estimated that by 1995 their population already had reached 10,000. Another study asserted that Italy had 4,004 Cape Verdean legal residents in 2002. The Cape Verdean embassy in Italy listed 9,978 of their nationals in Italy as of 2007.

== Migration history ==
Prior to independence in 1975, Cape Verdean immigrants were registered as Portuguese immigrants from the overseas province of Portuguese Cape Verde. Italy's first Cape Verdean migrants arrived in 1957. Early migration was almost exclusively female. The migrants consisted of young women recruited for live-in domestic work in Italy by Capuchin friars living in São Nicolau, Cape Verde. Roughly 3,500 had come to Italy in this manner by the end of 1972. The migrants settled primarily in Rome and Naples, with much smaller concentrations in Palermo and Milan.

== Employment ==
Domestic work remains an important source of employment for Cape Verdean women, though most have shifted to hourly work and living away from their workplace. Two factors have limited the shift away from domestic work into other lines of employment such as heavy industry: only a limited number of Cape Verdean men have migrated to Italy, and the Cape Verdeans are concentrated in the less-industrialised southern parts of Italy. They face increasing employment competition from Eastern European migrants. There is a weak trend towards entrepreneurship and self-employment.

== Education ==
Migrants generally had a low level of education upon their arrival. Illiteracy was common. However, many migrants took advantage of the education offered by the Portuguese School in Rome, which was officially recognised by the Portuguese Ministry of Education, and then afterwards entered into Italian universities.

== Social integration ==
In general, Cape Verdeans have not faced as severe a level of discrimination as other migrant groups like Moroccans. Officials generally view them as well-integrated and unproblematic. Their early presence in Italy was characterised by social and political invisibility, but by the 1980s and 1990s, as Italians began to understand that their country had become an importer rather than an exporter of migrant labour as it had traditionally been, more public attention was focused on the Cape Verdean presence.

One study found that roughly half of Cape Verdeans were married to Italians. It is common for children to be sent back to Cape Verde for their early education and then return to Italy when they are older.
