= SCADTA =

First airline in Latin America

SCADTA (Sociedad Colombo Alemana de Transportes Aéreos)
IATA	ICAO	Call sign
-	-	SCADTA
- Founded: December 5, 1919
- Commenced operations: September 5, 1920
- Ceased operations: June 14, 1940 (merged with SACO to form Avianca)
- Hubs: Soledad International Airport
- Focus cities: Techo International Airport
- Fleet size: See Avianca
- Parent company: Pan Am
- Headquarters: Barranquilla, Colombia
- Key people: Ernesto Cortissoz (First CEO)

Sociedad Colombo Alemana de Transportes Aéreos (SCADTA; German: Deutsch-Kolumbianische Luftverkehrsgesellschaft), was the world's second airline, and the first airline in Latin America, operating from 1919 until World War II. After the war, SCADTA merged with Colombian regional carrier Colombian Air Service (Spanish: Servicio Aéreo Colombiano), or SACO. Together, SCADTA and SACO formed Avianca - Aerovías Nacionales de Colombia, the Colombian flag-carrier. Avianca still operates to this day and claims SCADTA's history as its own, thus making it one of the world's oldest active airlines.

== History ==
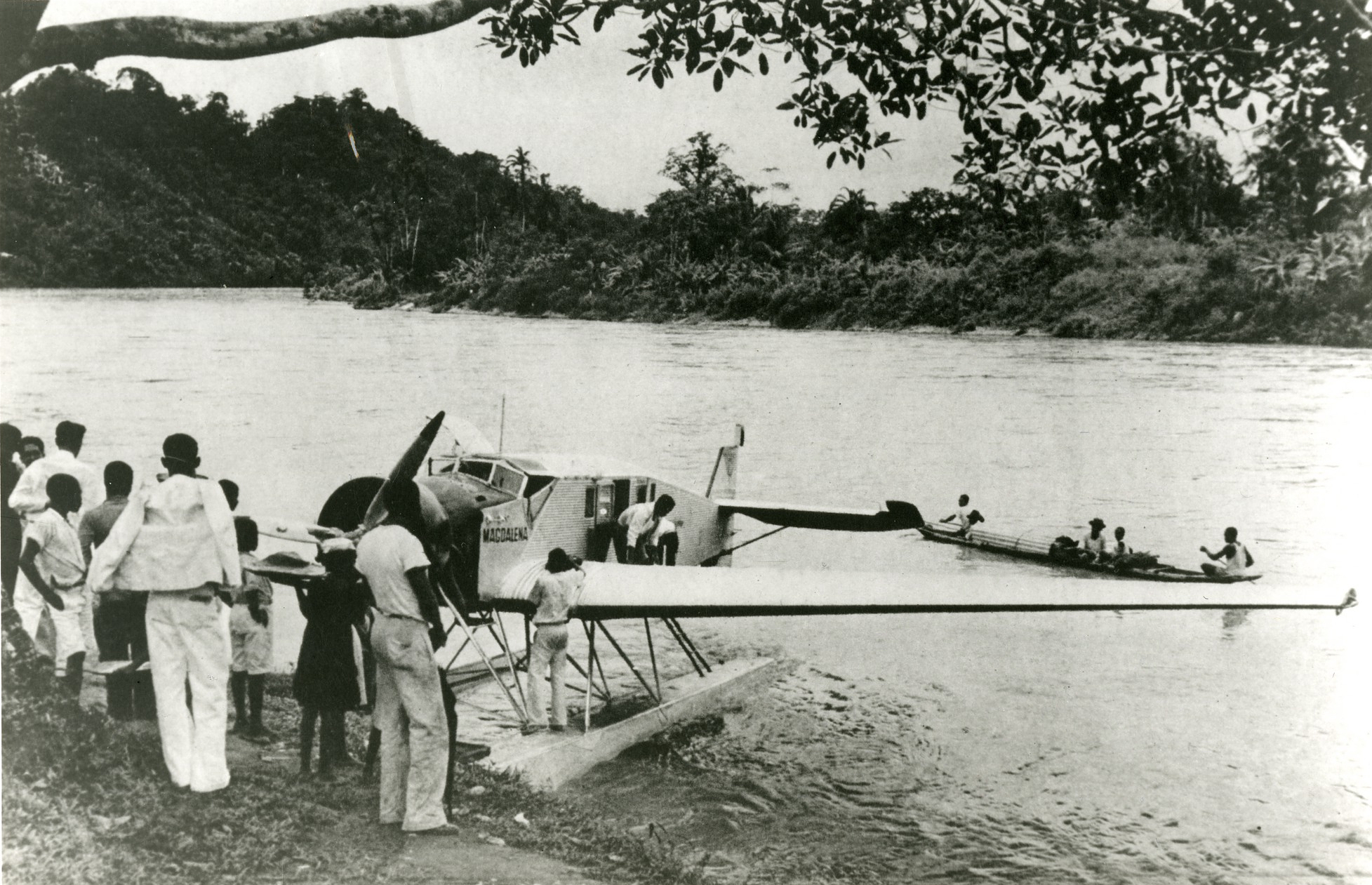
A SCADTA Junkers W 34 on the Magdalena River (circa 1920s)

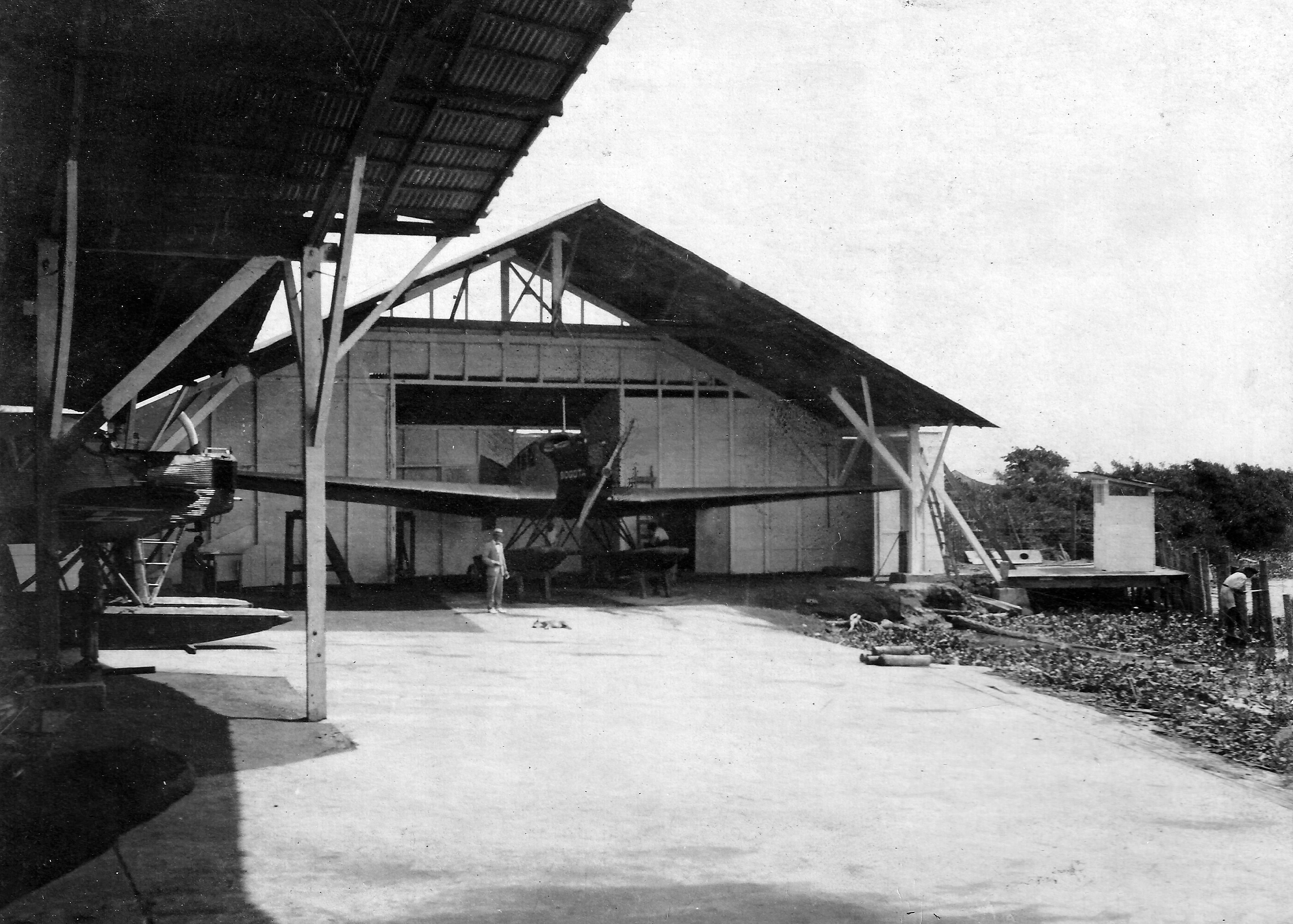
A SCADTA Hangar in Veranillo 1922

SCADTA started out as a small airmail carrier using Junkers seaplanes capable of landing on Colombia's Magdalena River, mostly since there were very few suitable landing strips in Colombia at the time. The German nationality of some of SCADTA's owners motivated the United States government to subsidize Pan American World Airways' expansion in Latin America under the Hoover administration. SCADTA was barred from operating flights to the United States and the Panama Canal, although it continued to maintain a broad route network throughout the Andean region. The formation of Pan American-Grace Airways in the 1930s further eroded SCADTA's position in the market.

Prior to World War II, the United States Government forced principal shareholder and Austrian industrialist Peter Paul von Bauer to sell his shares to Pan American World Airways in an attempt to protect the airline from acquisition by Nazi Germany. Many of the airline's pilots, technicians, and key administrators were German or Austrian, and even though most had lived in Colombia for several years, the United States was afraid that the SCADTA pilots were engaged in espionage, and could be plotting to convert civilian aircraft into bombers, in order to attack the Panama Canal.

The Colombian government was not concerned about SCADTA, though, and did not question the loyalty of the German pilots. However, restrictions were also placed on German pilots on how they could be utilized by an airline. For example, at least one pilot on every plane had to be Colombian.

In June 1940, SCADTA was forced to cease operations and its assets were merged by the Colombian government with the state-owned airline SACO, forming the modern Colombian national carrier, Avianca.

== See also ==
- Colombia during World War II
