= Ignacio Corsini =

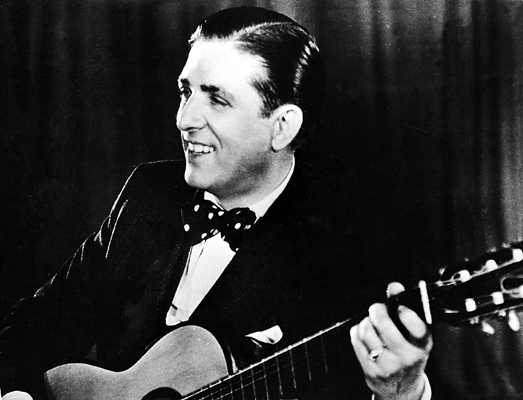
- Ignacio Corsini

Background information
- Born: Andrea Corsini; February 13, 1891
- Origin: Troina, Italy
- Died: July 26, 1967 (aged 76)
- Genres: Folklore, tango

Andrea "Ignacio" Corsini (February 13, 1891 – July 26, 1967) was an Italian-born Argentine folklore and tango musician.

== Life and work ==
Andrea Corsini, such his real name, was born in Troina, a village in the Enna Province of Sicily, in 1891. He was the foster son of Soccorza Salomone. Ms. Salomone left Italy for Buenos Aires, Argentina in 1901, and settled in the middle-class Almagro section of the city. They settled in Carlos Tejedor, then a small pampas town where Corsini would spend the remainder of his childhood, finding work as an ox cart driver and herdsman.

Corsini returned in 1907 to the Almagro section of Buenos Aires, where he was influenced by folk singer José Betinotti and a circus performer, José Pacheco. Pacheco introduced him to the theatre and to his own daughter, Victoria Pacheco, whom Corsini would marry in 1911. He went on to perform in numerous theatre companies and circuses, and in 1912, he was awarded a recording contract by RCA Victor. His interpretation of traditional folklore standards earned him singing roles in numerous Argentine films in subsequent years, mostly in period pieces set during Argentina's pastoral 19th century. These included: Santos Vega (1916), ¡Federación o muerte! (1917) and Milonguita (1922).

Having never attended a music conservatory, Corsini once attributed his unmistakable falsetto to his bucolic pampas upbringing, recalling that "birds taught me the spontaneity of their singing, without witnesses and in the great scenery of nature."

Corsini also earned renown as a tango vocalist, however. Initially avoiding the genre, he included one tango piece, "Un lamento," in a 1920 album. Well received, this recording would remain his sole foray into tango until, in 1922, he was persuaded to premiere "Patotero sentimental" in a sainete (stage comedy), "El bailarín del cabaret." Corsini secured his standing in the world of tango by popularizing Juan de Dios Filiberto's soulful milonga, "Caminito," in 1927. Written as an ode to what was then an oft-used shortcut in the blue-collar La Boca section of Buenos Aires, "Caminito" remains one of the most recognizable Argentine songs of any genre.

"El Caballero Cantor"—the "gentleman singer," as he was known by then—Corsini was also a composer and lyricist of numerous tangos, such as, among others, "Flor marchita," and "Aquel cantor de mi pueblo" (music by guitarist Enrique Maciel). The latter was immortalized by Corsini's one-time film co-star, Edmundo Rivero. He also composed in other genres, writing folklore pieces (such as "Tradición gaucha" and "A mi palomita"), and a waltz: "Tristeza criolla," based on a poem by Julián de Charras.

A 1929 songbook written as an ode to the era of 19th century strongman Juan Manuel de Rosas by poet Héctor Pedro Blomberg and guitarist Enrique Maciel featured Corsini as the lead vocalist, a performance considered by critics to have been th highlight of the album. His performance of the album's title track, "La pulpera de Santa Lucía," was critical to its being aired on the radio. This return to folklore was followed by similar performances on film, including Rapsodia gaucha (1932), Ídolos de la radio (1934, memorable also for a duet between two standards of tango, Ada Falcón and Carlos Gardel), and the western movie-styled Fortín alto (1941), where he was featured with Agustín Irusta and a then-unknown Edmundo Rivero.

These successes were dealt a bitter turn by the death of his wife Victoria, on May 28, 1949, following which he retired as a performer. Corsini penned his memoirs the following year, in which he wrote that "in her I found the great partner of all my life, who encouraged me in my uncertain hours and to whom I owe a great part of my success" (the autobiography was never published).

Corsini reappeared in 1961 for a Channel 7 special, "Volver a vivir" ("To Live Again"). This would be his last public performance, however, and on July 26, 1967, the 'gentleman singer' died at age 76.
