= Adriano Custódio Mendes =

Cape Verdean footballer (born 1961)

Personal information
- Full name: Adriano Tomaz Custódio Mendes
- Date of birth: 28 November 1961 (age 64)
- Place of birth: São Vicente, Portuguese Cape Verde
- Height: 1.69 m (5 ft 7 in)
- Position: Midfielder

Youth career
- Gimnasia LP
- Estudiantes

Senior career*
Years	Team	Apps	(Gls)
1981–1984	Estudiantes	50	(6)
1982	→ Danubio (loan)		
1985	Temperley	9	(1)
1985	Marítimo		
1985–1986	Temperley	14	(5)
1986	Blooming	8	(3)
1988	Cerro Porteño	4	(0)
1989–1990	Colón	43	(13)
1990–1991	San Martín Tucumán	37	(7)
1991	Santiago Wanderers	8	(1)
1992	Racing de Olavarría	–	(–)
1992	Boca Juniors Bragado	–	(–)
1993	Deportivo Táchira	17	(5)
1993–1994	Chacarita Juniors	25	(1)
1995	Deportes Iquique	8	(0)
1996–1997	Universidad		
1997	El Roble		
1997–1998	Temperley	18	(1)
1998	Guaraní Antonio Franco	–	(–)
1998	Social Ramallo	–	(–)
1998	Martín Güemes	–	(–)
- * Club domestic league appearances and goals

Adriano Tomaz Custódio Mendes (born 28 November 1961) is a Cape Verdean former professional footballer who played as a midfielder. Born in the Portuguese Cape Verde, thus holding Portuguese nationality at the time, he moved to Lisbon at age 8 and emigrated to Argentina at 12. before Cape Verde became independent from Portugal, and became a naturalized Argentine citizen. Custódio Mendes played for clubs in Argentina, Uruguay, Portugal, Chile, Bolivia, El Salvador, Honduras, Paraguay and Venezuela. Already retired, he visited now-independent Cape Verde for the first time in 2015, 42 years after leaving the islands, and the last time in 2017.

== Teams ==
- (Argentina) Estudiantes 1981
- (Uruguay) Danubio 1982
- (Argentina) Estudiantes 1982–1984
- (Argentina) Temperley 1985
- (Portugal) Marítimo 1985
- (Argentina) Temperley 1985–1986
- (Bolivia) Blooming 1986
- (Paraguay) Cerro Porteño 1988
- (Argentina) Colón 1989–1990
- (Argentina) San Martín de Tucumán 1990–1991
- (Chile) Santiago Wanderers 1991
- (Argentina) Racing de Olavarría 1992
- (Argentina) Boca Juniors de Bragado 1992
- (Venezuela) Deportivo Táchira 1993
- (Argentina) Chacarita Juniors 1993–1994
- (Chile) Deportes Iquique 1995
- (Honduras) Universidad 1996–1997
- (El Salvador) El Roble 1997
- (Argentina) Temperley 1997–1998
- (Argentina) Guaraní Antonio Franco 1998
- (Argentina) Social Ramallo 1998
- (Argentina) Martín Güemes 1998
