= Enrique Cadícamo =

Argentine tango lyricist, poet and novelist

- Born: 15 July 1900; Luján, Buenos Aires province
- Died: 3 December 1999 (aged 99); Buenos Aires
- Occupations: tango lyricist, poet and novelist
- Writing career
- Notable works: Canciones Tristes, La Luna del Bajo Fondo, Viento que Lleva y Trae

Enrique Domingo Cadícamo (Luján, Buenos Aires province, July 15, 1900 – Buenos Aires, December 3, 1999) was a prolific Argentine tango lyricist, poet and novelist. From an initial Symbolist bent, he developed a distinctive, lunfardo-rich style from an early age, and by 1925 he had his first piece, Pompas de jabón, sung by Carlos Gardel. Other notable compositions include Madame Ivonne, Che, papusa, oí, Anclado en París, Muñeca brava, Al Mundo le falta un Tornillo, Pa' que bailen los muchachos and Los mareados ("The dizzy ones"), originally titled Los dopados ("The doped ones"), about a couple that vows to get drunk after realizing their love is over.

== Career ==
Also prolific as a writer, he published three volumes of lyrical poetry (Canciones grises, 1926; La luna del bajo fondo, 1940; and Viento que lleva y trae, 1945), three biographical and historical books (El debut de Gardel en París, La historia del tango en París and Mis memorias), some theatrical works (La epopeya del tango and La baba del diablo, both co-written with Félix Pelayo, and El romance de dos vagos in collaboration with Germán Ziclis) and the narrative pieces El cantor de Buenos Aires, with Alberto Ballerini, and Los cuentos de un príncipe with Martín Lemos. In 1936 he wrote and directed the film Noites Cariocas.

As a recognition to his career, he was declared Illustrious Citizen of the city of Buenos Aires in 1987, and Emeritus of Argentine Culture in 1996. He died at 99 from heart failure.

Los mareados has enjoyed several revivals; it has been part of Mercedes Sosa's repertoire since the 1980s, and was also covered by Roberto Goyeneche and Andrés Calamaro.

Another Cadícamo lyric, Por la vuelta ("[A toast] to [our] return") is a mirror image of Los mareados: two former lovers meet a year after splitting up, find that their mutual friendship has survived their estrangement, and agree to drink to that. Incidentally, the drink of choice in both stories is champagne.

== Works ==
=== Books ===
- Canciones Tristes
- La Luna del Bajo Fondo
- Viento que Lleva y Trae
- "Historia del Tango en París
- El otro Juan Carlos Cobián
- Bajo el Signo del Tango

=== Theatre ===
- Así nos Paga la Vida
- La Baba del Diablo
- El Romance de Dos Vagos
- El Cantor de Buenos Aires
- La Epopeya del Tango

=== Tangos ===
- Los mareados
- Por la vuelta
- Nostalgias
- Pompas de Jabón
- Muñeca Brava
- Vieja Recova
- ¡Che, papusa... Oí!
- Madame Ivonne
- Nunca tuvo novio
- Notas de bandoneón
- " El canto de Buenos Aires"
- " La casita de mis viejos"
- " Niebla del riachuelo"

=== Films ===
The life of Carlos Gardel

Producer Martin Deluca scrimplay by

Enrique Cadicamo

- Passport to Rio (1948)
