= Cape Verdeans in France =

Ethnic group

Total population
- 21,000

Regions with significant populations
- Paris

Languages
- French, Portuguese, Cape Verdean Creole

Religion
- Roman Catholicism

Related ethnic groups
- Portuguese in France

Cape Verdeans in France are residents of France who are from Cape Verde or have Cape Verdean ancestry.

Cape Verdeans began arriving in France in 1964, from Rotterdam, Dakar, and Lisbon. They took jobs in the coal mines, in the iron foundries, and as masons, and the women typically became domestics. Prior to independence in 1975, Cape Verdean immigrants were registered as Portuguese immigrants from the overseas province of Portuguese Cape Verde. The Cape Verdeans immigrants concentrated in the cities of Paris.

As of 1995, it was estimated that there were 8,000 Cape Verdeans in France and the 1999 census counted 21,000 descendants. As of 2007, the embassy in Paris had 17,544 registered Cape Verdeans, although that number only includes those who are documented and registered. Many are undocumented or choose not to register with the embassy. Additionally, tabulating is difficult because many Cape Verdeans arrived in France with passports from other host countries, like Portugal or the Netherlands. Thus, taking all these factors into consideration, the embassy estimates that there are about 21,000 Cape Verdeans and their descendants currently residing in France. As of 2008, the Cape Verde Consulate in Marseille was attempting to help Cape Verdeans in France find jobs.

== Notable people ==
- Patrick Vieira
- Georges Santos
- Manuel dos Santos Fernandes
- Stomy Bugsy
- Jacques Faty
- Ricardo Faty
- Mayra Andrade
- Logan Costa
- Steven Moreira
