= Guillermo Barbieri =

Argentine composer and singer (1894–1935)

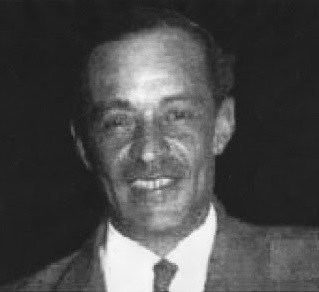
- Born: Guillermo Desiderio Barbieri Hernández; September 25, 1894; Buenos Aires, Argentina
- Died: June 26, 1935 (aged 40); Medellín, Colombia
- Occupations: Singer composer guitarist
- Years active: 1921–1935
- Spouse: Rosario Acosta

Guillermo Barbieri (September 25, 1894, in Buenos Aires – June 26, 1935, in Medellín) was an Argentine composer and singer, and one of the guitarists of the famous singer Carlos Gardel.

== Life ==
Guillermo Desiderio Barbieri developed his passion for the guitar from a young age, a talent he inherited from his father, Tristán Barbieri, an amateur guitarist. At the age of seventeen, he decided to marry Rosario Acosta, with whom he had five children: María Esther, Carmen Luz, Marta Adela, Guillermo Oscar, and Alfredo Barbieri (whose godfather was Gardel).

He was the grandfather of comedian and actress Carmen Barbieri and the great-grandfather of actor Federico Bal.

== Professional career ==
In the second decade of the 20th century, he joined a trio with Félix Rodríguez on bandoneón and Pedro Vallarino on violin. They performed at serenades and baptisms during their stays in the city's neighborhoods. Beginning in 1916, he played with his partner at the time, Luciano Gardelli, nicknamed "El Tanito." On January 1, 1921, the Gardelli-Barbieri duo made their debut at the Teatro Español.

=== With Gardel ===
In an interview for the Uruguayan magazine Cancionera, he said that he met Carlos Gardel and José Razzano at a party held in Bajo Belgrano. He said:

"When the party ended, we each said goodbye, and they told me they needed to talk to me later. The next day, Razzano came to the Teatro Esmeralda (now Teatro Maipo), where I was working. He spoke to me, we reached an agreement, and from that moment on, I had my place. That was in 1919. This coming February 8 will mark 14 years as a guitarist for the 'Magician' (Gardel)."

— Guillermo Barbieri

The tango Los ruiseñores was the first piece composed by Barbieri. He committed to using it in 1921 in a version for Roberto Firpo's orchestra. It was first performed in Montevideo alongside José Ricardo on guitar, accompanying the Gardel-Razzano duo near the end of that year, at the Teatro Artigas on December 6.

Barbieri worked continuously with the Gardel-Razzano duo until it dissolved at the end of 1925, so he stayed in Buenos Aires, while Carlos Gardel traveled to Europe with José Ricardo. However, during the previous trip to Spain, made in November 1923 with the Rivera-De Rosas Company, Guillermo Barbieri was included.

When Gardel returned from Europe in the 1926, Guillermo Barbieri immediately rejoined the group and toured Europe until October 1931, when "El zorzal" (The Thrush) traveled again, alone.

In Buenos Aires, Gardel reorganized his accompaniment and formed a quartet with Horacio Pettorossi, Guillermo Barbieri, Ángel Domingo Riverol, and Julio Vivas. It was 1933, and it marked Gardel's last appearance in the Río de la Plata. On his trip north, Barbieri, Riverol, and José María Aguilar boarded the plane "Panamericana" on January 12, 1935.

In an interview about his relationship with Gardel, he expressed:

"In my long time performing alongside him, I must express that I have always felt the deepest admiration for him. I never addressed him informally, despite having shared more than one wild night together. Gardel's neck speaks to me when he sings; my knowledge of Carlos is so great that when he sings, I understand the meaning of the slightest of his movements, and every tilt of his head holds the secret of a language that only I know how to understand."

— Guillermo Barbieri

=== Film and radio ===
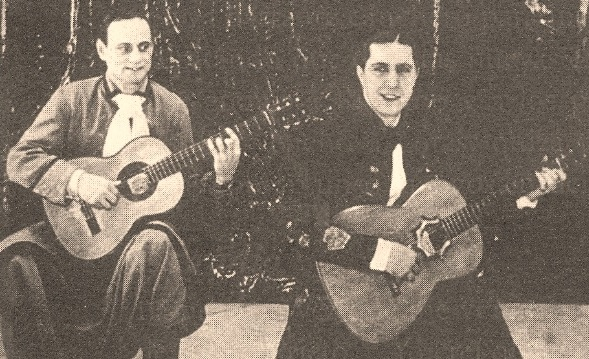
Barbieri alongside Carlos Gardel in the 1930s.

Barbieri's appearances in film were alongside Carlos Gardel, whom he accompanied musically in the following films:

- Mano a mano
- Canchero
- Enfundá la mandolina
- Yira, yira
- Tengo miedo
- Padrino pelao
- El quinielero
- Añoranzas
- El carretero
- Luces de Buenos Aires

Between October 21 and December 4 of the same year, he also accompanied him on Radio Splendid and Rivadavia in the program La hora Geniol, where they had the opportunity to perform some instrumental pieces.

=== Works ===
Barbieri, in addition to being a talented guitarist, was a renowned composer of Argentine popular music, especially tango. Many of his compositions were performed by Carlos Gardel.

- Anclao en París
- Viejo barrio
- Incurable
- La novia ausente
- Besos que matan
- Cruz de palo
- Lobo de mar
- Dicha pasada
- La novia ausente
- El que atrasó el reloj
- Preparate p'al domingo
- Pobre Amigo
- Pordioseros
- Mi ranchito
- Quejas del alma
- Recordándote
- Resignate hermano
- Se llama mujer
- Tierra hermana
- Tus violetas
- Fumar viejo
- Los valses
- Que lindo es el shimmy
- Mi manta pampa
- Rosa de otoño
- Alicia
- Tu vieja ventana
- Viejo smoking

== Death ==
Guillermo Barbieri died in the plane crash of June 24, 1935, in Medellín, in which Carlos Gardel and Alfredo Le Pera also lost their lives while they were on a tour of Latin America. His remains, along with those of the other guitarists who died in the accident, are buried in La Chacarita Cemetery, in Buenos Aires.

In 2012, Guillermo Barbieri was remembered in a special episode of the Argentine television program Crónica TV, titled La tragedia de los famosos (The Tragedy of the Famous), dedicated to Carlos Gardel.
