= List of Argentine films of 1962 =

A list of films produced in Argentina in 1962:

Argentine films of 1962
Title	Director	Release	Genre
A - D
Accidente 703	José María Forqué		Drama
A hierro muere	Manuel Mur Oti	3 May	
Bajo un mismo rostro	Daniel Tinayre	19 September	
El bruto	Rubén W. Cavallotti	3 May	
La Burrerita de Ypacaraí	Armando Bó	5 April	
Buscando a Mónica	José María Forqué	29 March	
La cifra impar	Manuel Antín	15 November	drama
Cristóbal Colón en la Facultad de Medicina	Julio Saraceni	8 March	Comedy
Dar la cara	José A. Martínez Suárez	29 November	drama
Delito	Ralph Pappier	25 July	
Detrás de la mentira	Emilio Vieyra	12 December	
Dr. Cándido Pérez, Sras.	Emilio Vieyra	15 November	comedia
E - M
La Flor de Irupé	Alberto Du Bois	4 October	
Hombre de la esquina rosada	René Mugica	26 June	drama
Hombres y mujeres de blanco	Enrique Carreras	27 June	
Homenaje a la hora de la siesta	Leopoldo Torre Nilsson	4 September	drama
Huis Clos (A puerta cerrada)	Pedro Escudero	5 September	
Los inundados	Fernando Birri	26 April	
Interpol llamando a Río	Leo Fleider	8 August	
Los jóvenes viejos	Rodolfo Kuhn	5 June	drama
El mago de las finanzas	Julio Saraceni	29 August	
Mãos Sangrentas	Carlos Hugo Christensen	1962 (Estados Unidos)	
Mate Cosido	Goffredo Alessandrini	28 June	
N - Z
Operación "G"	Ralph Pappier	27 September	
Prisioneros de una noche	David José Kohon	30 January	
Propiedad	Mario Soffici	13 June	
Reencuentro con la gloria	Iván Grondona	1 November	
Setenta veces siete	Leopoldo Torre Nilsson	30 August	drama
Socia de alcoba	George Cahan	5 June	
El televisor	Guillermo Fernández Jurado	19 April	
El terrorista	Daniel Cherniavsky	18 October	
El último piso	Daniel Cherniavsky	5 June	
Una jaula no tiene secretos	Agustín Navarro	3 October	
Los viciosos	Enrique Carreras	25 October	

== External links and references ==
- Argentine films of 1962 at the Internet Movie Database
