= El Crack =

El Crack may refer to:

- El Crack (1960 film), a 1960 Argentine film
- El Crack (1981 film), a 1981 Spanish film
