= The Bitter Stems =

1956 Argentine film noir

- Theatrical release poster
- Directed by: Fernando Ayala
- Written by: Sergio Leonardo
- Based on: Los Tallos Amargos by Adolfo Jasca
- Starring: Carlos Cores; Julia Sandoval; Gilda Lousek; Vassili Lambrinos; Pablo Moret
- Cinematography: Ricardo Younis
- Edited by: Gerardo Rinaldi; Antonio Ripoll
- Music by: Astor Piazzolla
- Production company: Artistas Argentinos Asociados
- Release date: 1956
- Running time: 90 minutes
- Country: Argentina
- Language: Spanish

The Bitter Stems (Spanish: Los Tallos Amargos) is a 1956 Argentine film noir directed by Fernando Ayala. It is considered one of the last films of the Golden Age of Argentine Cinema. The screenplay, written by Sergio Leonardo, is based on the novel Los Tallos Amargos by Adolfo Jasca. The film's music was composed by Astor Piazzolla.

The film was considered lost until it turned up in a private collection in 2014. A 35mm version was subsequently restored by the UCLA Film & Television Archive, with funding provided by the Film Noir Foundation and Hollywood Foreign Press Association's Charitable Trust, and premiered in January 2016 at the Noir City Film Festival, before playing in February 2016 at the Museum of Modern Art in New York. When the film played at the TCM Classic Film Festival in Hollywood later that year, the presenter noted that while the 35mm negative was rediscovered, the soundtrack remained lost, so the restoration used the track from the director's 16mm print.

== Premise ==
A washed up reporter teams up with an immigrant from Hungary to start a fake journalism by correspondence school.

== Cast ==
- Carlos Cores as Alfredo Gasper
- Julia Sandoval as Susana
- Gilda Lousek as Esther
- Vassili Lambrinos as Liudas
- Pablo Moret as Jarvis

== Awards ==
Year	Award	Category	Recipient(s)	Result	Ref.
1957	Argentine Film Critics Association	Best Film	The Bitter Stems	Won	
1957	Argentine Film Critics Association	Best Director	Fernando Ayala	Won	
1957	Argentine Film Critics Association	Best Adapted Screenplay	Sergio Leonardo	Won	

== Legacy ==
The American Cinematographer named The Bitter Stems one of the “50 Best Photographed Films of All-Time”.

In 2022, the film was ranked 42nd on the list of the 100 Greatest Films of Argentine Cinema, a poll organized by specialized magazines La vida útil, Taipei and La tierra quema, and presented at the Mar del Plata International Film Festival.

== Home media ==
The Bitter Stems was released on Blu-ray by Flicker Alley in 2021.

In February 2025, the film was released on The Criterion Channel.
