= Ovidio José Bianquet =

Argentine dancer (1885–1942)

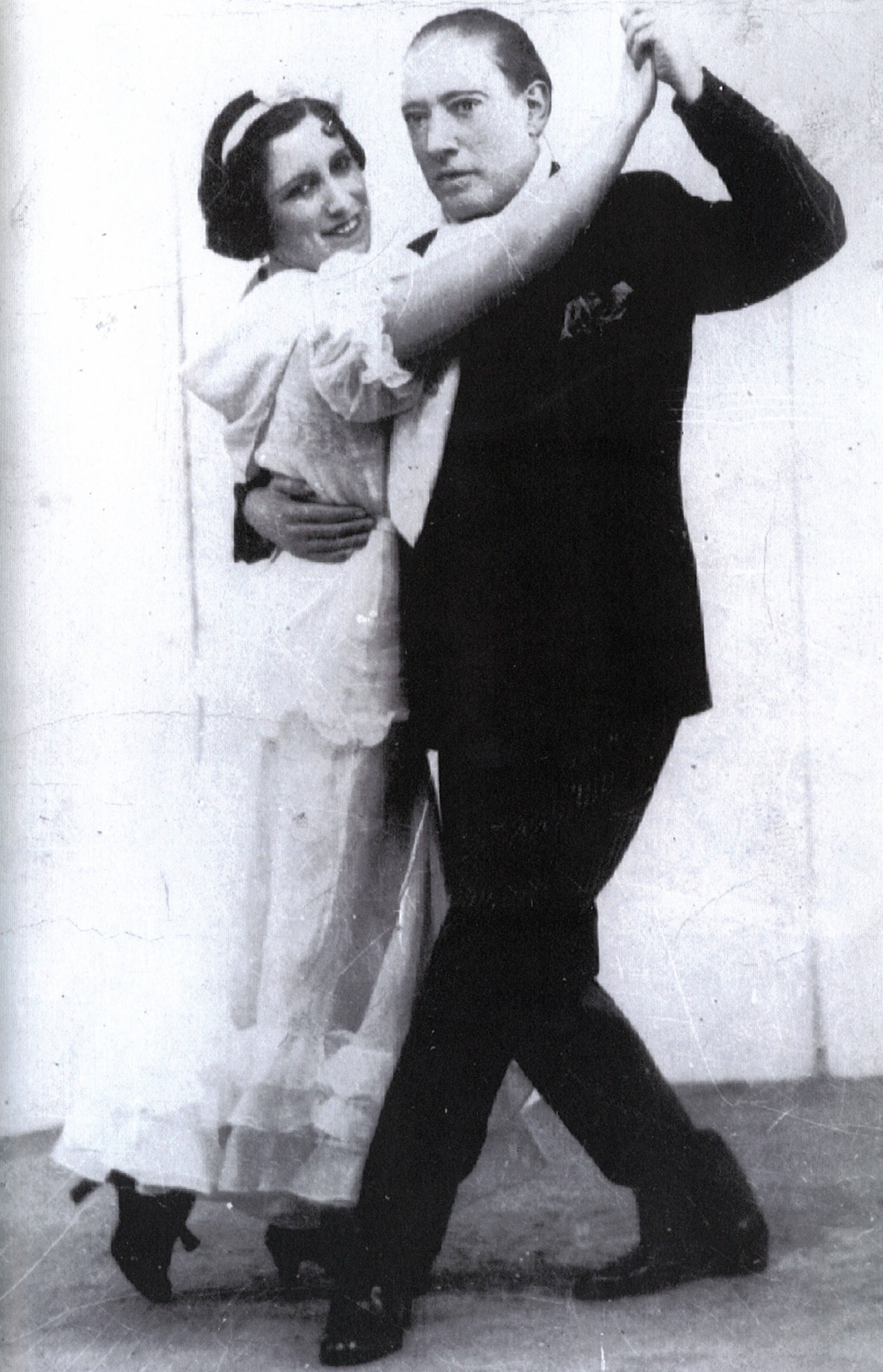
- Born: 14 February 1885; Buenos Aires, Argentina
- Died: 7 February 1942 (aged 56); Mar del Plata, Argentina
- Other names: El Cachafaz, Benito Bianquet
- Occupation: Tango dancer

Ovidio José Bianquet (14 February 1885 – 7 February 1942) was an Argentine tango dancer, best known as “El Cachafaz.” In his honor, 7 February was established as Tango Dancer's Day in Argentina.

== Life ==
He was born at the corner of Boedo and Independencia avenues, in the Boedo neighborhood. From a very young age, he attracted attention for his skill in body movements and, later on, began to gain popularity as a dancer.

Nació en la esquina de las avenidas Boedo e Independencia, en el barrio de Boedo. Desde muy pequeño llamó la atención por su destreza en los movimientos corporales y, más adelante, comenzó a ganar popularidad como bailarín.

In 1911, he competed in a tango contest alongside major figures of the time such as Elías Alippi, Juan Carlos Herrera, Ambrosio Radrizzani, and Enrique Muiño, and won first prize.

His nickname El Cachafaz means ‘rascal, shameless, insolent, mischievous, lazy,’ and it apparently reflected the judgment he earned from his elders in his youth, especially due to his behavior with women. He was also known, for undocumented reasons, as Benito Bianquet.

In 1911, he traveled to the United States, and upon returning two years later, he opened a dance academy. In 1916, he appeared in Resaca, the first of the 14 films in which he participated.

In 1919, he was in Paris, apparently giving dance lessons to members of high society and performing at the cabaret El Garrón, where the Argentine musician Manuel Pizarro performed alongside his brothers, but he eventually returned to his country.

He worked extensively with Francisco Canaro’s revue companies. When he traveled, he greatly missed what he considered his home—the café at Corrientes and Talcahuano—where he always sat at the same table in the afternoons and welcomed his friends, among them Carlos Gardel.

Between 1910 and 1929, his partners in both life and dance were Emma Bóveda, Elsa O'Connor—who later became a prominent dramatic actress in theater and film—and Isabel San Miguel. From 1933 until his death, Carmencita Calderón was his partner, but only in dance; she appears dancing with him in the 1933 film Tango when she was a young woman under 20 years old.

His last performance was at a venue called El Rancho Grande, in Mar del Plata, on February 7, 1942. After finishing his performance, he returned to his lodging, where he was later found dead of natural causes.
