= Argentine tango (disambiguation) =

Argentine tango or Tango Argentino or is a social dance. It may also refer to:

- Tango music as a musical genre
- Tango Argentino (musical), a musical created by Claudio Segovia.
- Tango Argentino (film), 1969 Argentine documentary

== See also ==
- Tanghi Argentini, a Belgian live action short film nominated for an Oscar at the 80th Academy Awards.
