= Elena Lucena =

Argentine actress (1914–2015)

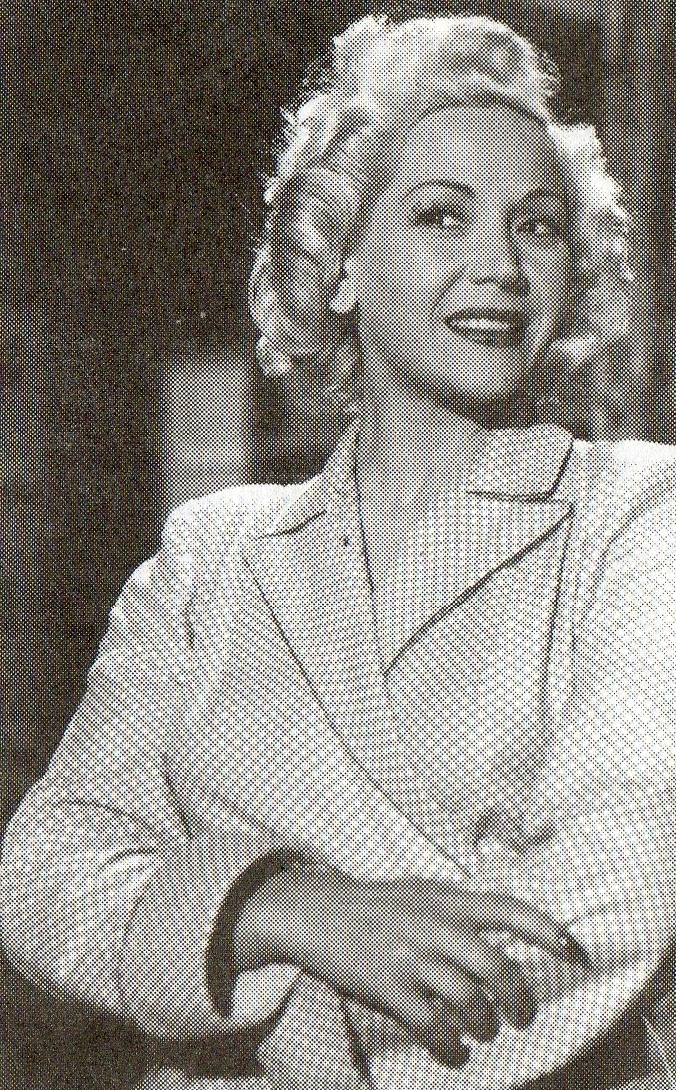
- Born: María Elena Lucena; 25 September 1914; Buenos Aires, Argentina
- Died: 7 October 2015 (aged 101)
- Occupation: actress
- Years active: 1937–2012

María Elena Lucena Arcuri (25 September 1914 – 7 October 2015) was an Argentine film actress of the Golden Age of Argentine cinema. She began her career in radio in the 1930s and reached her greatest success with the role of "Chimbela", which was later depicted in film, theater and television. Her extensive film career includes approximately 50 films, including notable performances in Chimbela (1939) and Una noche cualquiera (1951). During the 1940s, she participated in films with comedians like Pepe Arias, Pepe Iglesias "El Zorro", Niní Gambier, Mirtha Legrand and Carlos Estrada. Her most acclaimed film work occurred in Elvira Fernández, vendedora de tienda (1942) by Manuel Romero, Cinco besos by Luis Saslavsky and La Rubia Mireya for which she received the 1948 Best Comedy Actress Award from the Argentine Film Critics Association.

She also performed as a dancer and, beginning in 1960, did several musical comedies. On stage she replaced Libertad Lamarque in Hello, Dolly! and she portrayed the widow of Larraín de Valenzuela in the Chilean comedy La pérgola de las flores, which was later made into a movie. Beginning in the late 1960s, she participated in several television roles. Her later performances include the series 099 Central (2002) and the 2010 film Brother and Sister for which she was nominated as Best Supporting Actress and a role in the 2012 TV movie El Tabarís, lleno de estrellas. She had one of the longest careers of Argentine actresses and was one of the last survivors of Argentine cinema from the 1930s. She retired in 2012.

== Biography ==
Lucena was born on 25 September 1914 in Buenos Aires, Argentina. She was working as a seamstress, getting paid eighty cents per dozen shirts made, when she made a radio test to sing tangos. Her mother was against it, but it paid 60 pesos per month. She took the contract at Radio Belgrano. Beginning as a singer in 1937, she soon moved from singing into acting, reading tragic parts on Radio Belgrano, where it was noted that she had an expressive face. She moved to the National Radio as part of an acting troupe "Estampas porteñas" and soon after, caught the attention of Arsenio Mármol. He created a character called "Chimbela" for her which she performed on radio and later on film, theater and television. Almost immediately the role brought success and she began touring the country, and appeared on both the Teatro Palmolive and Radio Cine Lux.

Her film debut was in La que no perdonó (1938), under the direction of José A. Ferreyra with Elsa O'Connor, Mario Danesi and José Olarra. In 1939 her signature character was taken to film in a screenplay written by Antonio Botta and directed by Ferreyra and Lucena was the star of Chimbela, although it was only her second film. The story is of a young girl who is supporting her family and falls in love with a man who is running from the police for a murder he did not commit. The supporting cast included Eloy Álvarez, Floren Delbene, Mary Dormal, Nuri Montsé and others. She also made her next two films El ángel de trapo (1940) and Pájaros sin nido (1940) with Ferreyra. Some of her most memorable roles were: Ven mi corazón te llama (1942); Elvira Fernández, vendedora de tiendas (1942) directed by Manuel Romero with Paulina Singerman; Cinco besos (1945) in which she worked with Mirtha Legrand; La Rubia Mireya (1948) by Manuel Romero with Mecha Ortiz for which she won Best Comic Actress from the Argentine Film Critics Association; Una noche cualquiera (1951); El Calavera (1954) by Carlos Borcosque; and La murga (1963) by René Mugica.

In addition to film, Lucena worked in many of the theaters along Calle Corrientes and traveled with tours both throughout Argentina and through Brazil, Spain and Uruguay. Participating in both classic and modern works, some of her most memorable performances were in Cuando el gato no está, Cuando las mujeres dicen sí, Cuanta Milonga, Cuatro escalones abajo, El enfermo imaginario, Juanita la popular, Madame 13, Penélope ya no teje, La Pulga en la Oreja, Quien me presta una hija, Valss, Vengo por el aviso, and Una viuda difícil among others. During Libertad Lamarque's run of Hello Dolly!, produced by Luis Sandrini and Daniel Tinayre, Lucena was called in to replace Lamarque. She also performed in the Chilean musical La pérgola de las flores by Isidora Aguirre, which made a successful run throughout Latin America.

From the 1960s Lucena began working in television. Some of her most noted performances included Piel Naranja (1975), Duro como la piedra, frágil como el cristal (1985–1986), Como pan caliente (1996), 099 Central (2002) and El Tabarís, lleno de estrellas (2012). She died on 7 October 2015 at the age of 101.

== Awards and nominations ==
- 1948: Best Comic Actress (Argentine Film Critics Association) for La Rubia Mireya
- 2006: Silver Condor (lifetime achievement award) from the Argentine Film Critics Association
- 2011: Nominated for Best Supporting Actress (Argentine Film Critics Association) for Brother and Sister

== Filmography ==
=== Films ===
- La que no perdonó (1938)
- Chimbela (1939)
- El ángel de trapo (1940)
- Pájaros sin nido (1940)
- Napoleón (1941)
- Elvira Fernández, vendedora de tienda (1942)
- Ven...mi corazón te llama (1942)
- Un nuevo amanecer (1942)
- La calle Corrientes (1943)
- Cinco besos (1945)
- La Rubia Mireya (1948)
- Una noche en el Ta Ba Rin (1949)
- Valentina (1950)
- Una noche cualquiera (1951)
- El Calavera (1954)
- Estrellas de Buenos Aires (1956)
- Buenas noches, mi amor (inconclusa – 1961)
- Buscando a Mónica (1962)
- La murga (1963)
- El Galleguito de la cara sucia (1966)
- La casa de Madame Lulú (1968)
- Joven, viuda y estanciera (1970)
- La casa del amor (1973)
- Millonarios a la fuerza (1979)
- Frutilla (1980)
- Una viuda descocada (1980)
- Luna de octubre (1997)
- Brother and Sister (2010)

=== Television ===
- Domingos de teatro cómico (1969)
- Viernes de Pacheco (1971) Episode:"Giuanín, Rey de la pizza" ... (Rosaura)
- Aplausos (1972) ... (Margo)
- Todo es amor (1972–1973)
- El patio de la Morocha (1973) ... (Reneé)
- Piel de pueblo (1973) ... (Rosita's mother)
- El chupete (1973–1976)
- Piel naranja (1975) ... (Angélica)
- Herencia de amor (1981) ... (Jorgelina)
- Aprender a vivir (1981–1982) ... (Zuzú)
- El ciclo de Guillermo Bredeston y Nora Cárpena (1982) Episode: "La viuda es sueño" ... (Julia)
- Duro como la roca, frágil como el cristal (1985–1986) ... (Tona)
- Alta Comedia (1994)
- Como pan caliente (1996)
- 099 Central (2002)
- El Tabarís, lleno de estrellas (2012)

== See also ==
- List of centenarians (actors, filmmakers and entertainers)
