= Responsibility (film) =

Responsibilith
- Spanish: Dar la cara
- Directed by: José A. Martínez Suárez
- Written by: David Viñas
- Release date: 1962
- Running time: 110 minute
- Country: Argentina
- Language: Spanish

Responsibility (Spanish: Dar la cara) is a 1962 Argentine film directed by José A. Martínez Suárez and written by David Viñas.

The famous Argentinian comic strip Mafalda's main character is inspired by one of the character of this movie.

== Cast ==
- Leonardo Favio
- Luis Medina Castro
- Pablo Moret
- Nuria Torray
- Ubaldo Martínez
- Daniel de Alvarado
- Lautaro Murúa
- Guillermo Bredeston
- Walter Santa Ana
- Cacho Espíndola
- Augusto Fernandes
- Héctor Pellegrini
- Dora Baret
- Adolfo Aristarain – Extra
- Rosángela Balbo
- Pino Solanas – Extra
- Elena Tasisto – Chola
- Martín Andrade
- Graciela Araujo – Voz de Nuria Torray en el doblaje
- María Vaner – Cameo
- Susana Mayo
- Orlando Marconi
