= Good Night, My Love =

Good Night, My Love may refer to:

- Good Night, My Love (1961 film), an Argentine film
- Good Night, My Love (1951 film), a Mexican romantic drama film
