= Lilián del Río =

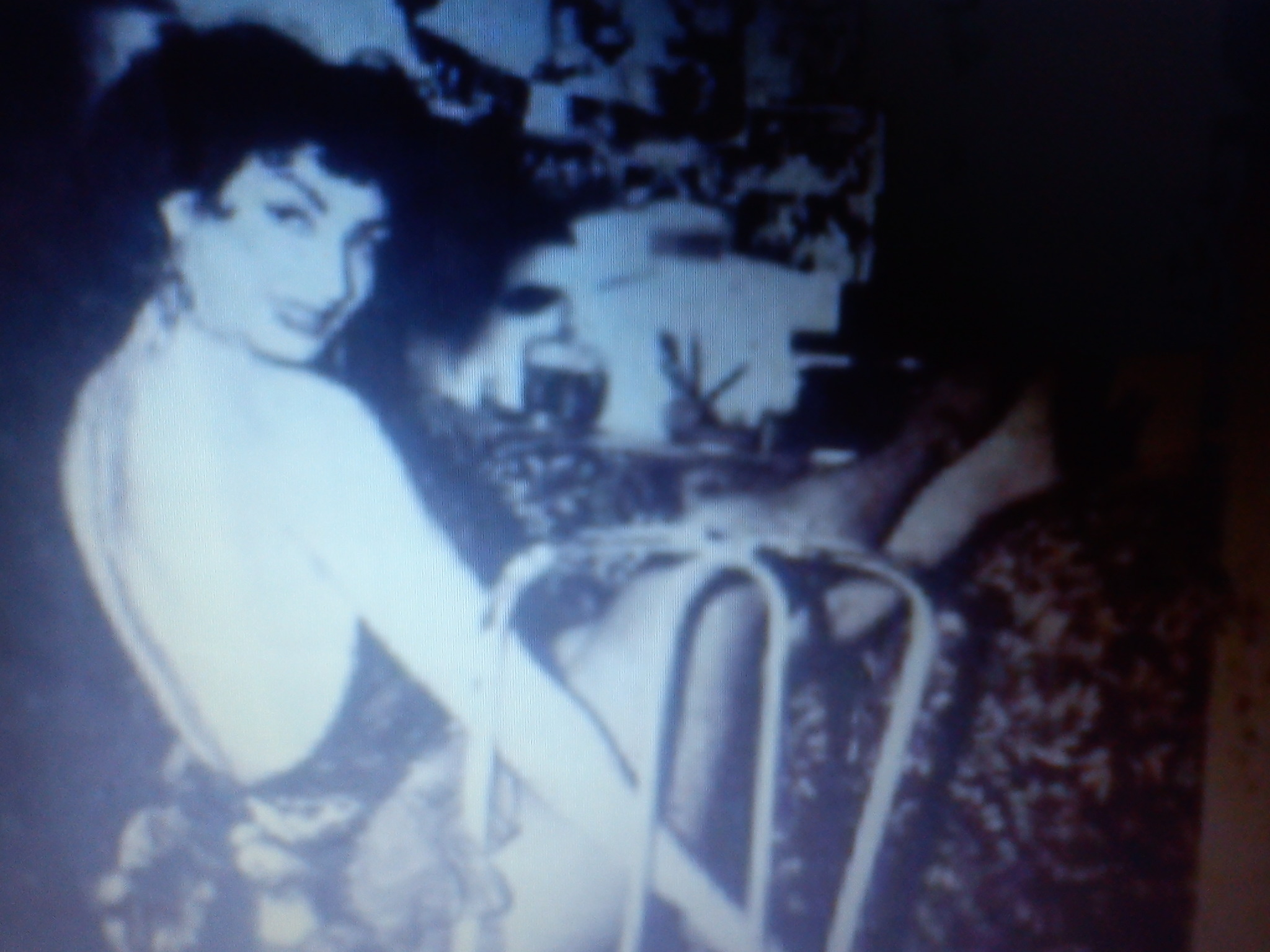
Lilián del Río

Lilián del Río (October 8, 1930 – October 5, 1990) was an Argentine vedette star most known for her revue performances. In 1956, del Río starred in the play Ni Militar, ni Marino… El Presidente Argentino with, among others, Margarita Padín, Pedro Quartucci and Enrique Serrano. Her only film appearance was when she starred in Reencuentro con la gloria (1957) playing opposite Martín Karadagián, which was directed by Ivan Grondona, but it was not released until 1962.

== Personal life ==
Del Río was married to actor Héctor Armendáriz, who put his career on hold to take care of del Río during her last long illness. She died of lung cancer in 1990 three days before her 60th birthday.
