= Una cita con la vida =

1958 film

- Directed by: Hugo del Carril
- Written by: Eduardo Borrás; Bernardo Verbitsky
- Release date: 1958
- Running time: 89 minutes
- Country: Argentina
- Language: Spanish

Una cita con la vida is a 1958 Argentine melodrama film directed by Hugo del Carril. It starred Gilda Lousek and Enzo Viena. It is based on a novel by Bernardo Verbitsky.

== Premise ==
The love story of two teenagers, children of indifferent parents.

== Cast ==
- Gilda Lousek as Nélida
- Enzo Viena as Luis
- Pedro Laxalt
- Tito Alonso
- Silvia Nolasco as The Nélida's Mother
- Graciela Borges as The Nélida's friend
- Rodolfo Ranni as Luis's friend #1
- Javier Portales as Luis's friend #2
