= Aníbal Troilo =

Argentine tango musician (1914–1975)

Aníbal Carmelo Troilo
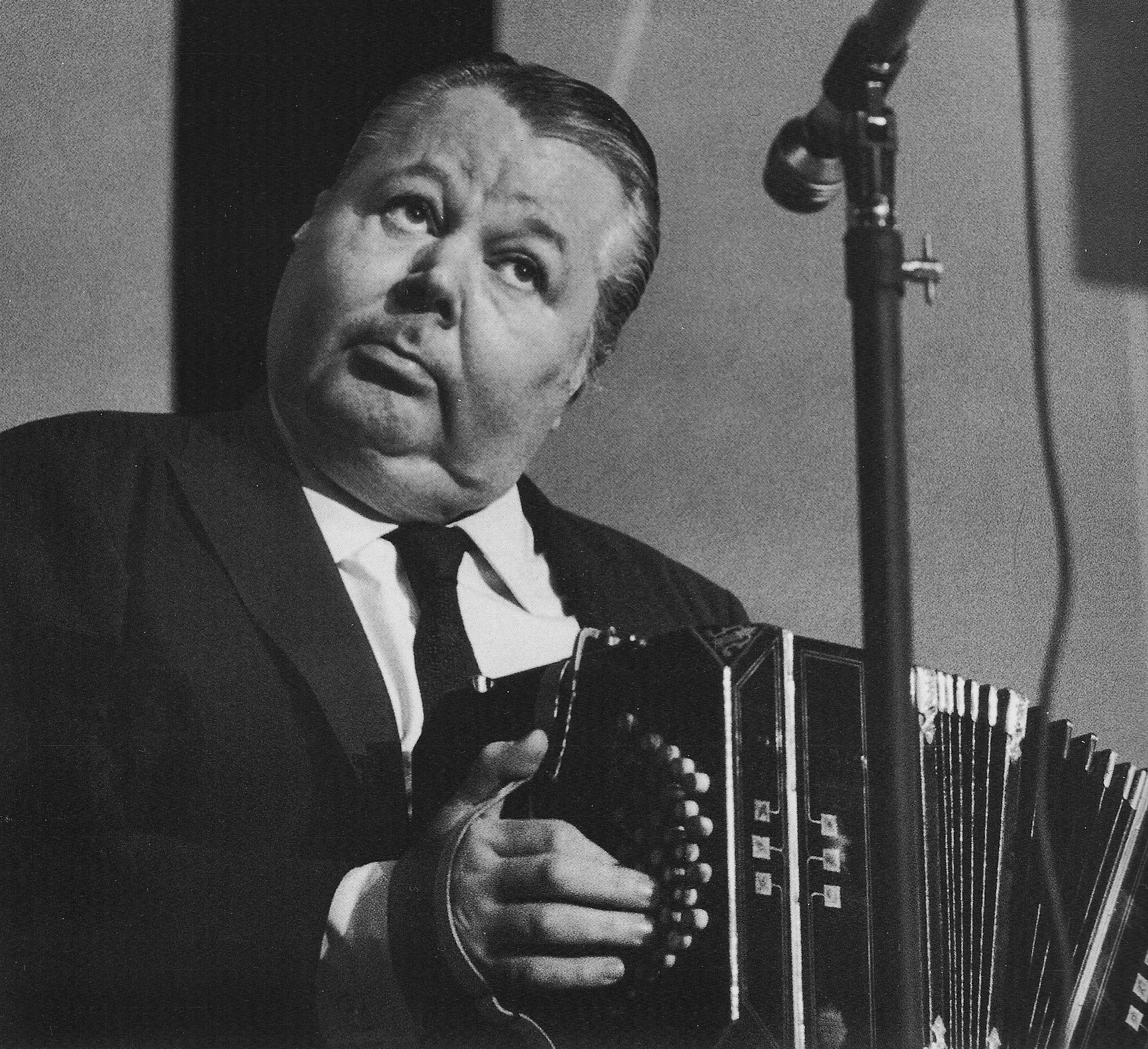
- Troilo in 1971

Background information
- Also known as: Pichuco
- Born: 11 July 1914; Buenos Aires, Argentina
- Died: 18 May 1975 (aged 60); Buenos Aires, Argentina
- Genres: Tango
- Occupations: Orchestra director; Composer; Bandoneon player
- Instrument: Bandoneon

Aníbal Carmelo Troilo (11 July 1914 – 18 May 1975), also known as Pichuco, was an Argentine tango musician.

Troilo was a bandoneon player, composer, arranger, and bandleader in Argentina. His orquesta típica was among the most popular with social dancers during the golden age of tango (1940–1955), but he changed to a concert sound by the late 1950s.

Troilo's orchestra is best known for its instrumentals, though he also recorded with many well-known vocalists such as Roberto Goyeneche, Edmundo Rivero and Francisco Fiorentino. His rhythmic instrumentals and the recordings he made with vocalist Francisco Fiorentino from 1941 to 1943, known as milongas, were some of the favourites in tango salons. The renowned bandoneonist Astor Piazzolla played in and arranged for Troilo's orquesta típica during the period of 1939–1944.

== Biography ==
Aníbal Troilo was born on 11 July 1914, to Felisa Bagnoli and Aníbal Troilo, in the well-known barrio of Abasto. His father nicknamed him "Pichuco", an alteration of the Neapolitan "picciuso", meaning "weepy", or "crybaby". He had one brother and one sister. During his childhood, Troilo listened to the bandoneon in the bars of his neighbourhood. At the age of 10, he convinced his mother to buy him his first bandoneon. Troilo kept the instrument and played it for the rest of his life.

When he was 11, in 1925, Pichuco played his first performance in a bar. At the age of 14, he formed his first quintet. He studied until his third year of high school at Escuela Superior de Comercio Carlos Pellegrini, one of the most prestigious high schools in Argentina and the whole of Latin America.

In December 1930, Troilo was hired to be part of the famous Vardaro-Pugliese sextet of violinist Elvino Vardaro, pianist Osvaldo Pugliese, violinist Alfredo Gobbi, bandoneon player Miguel Jurado (later replaced by Ciriaco Ortiz), and double bass player Luis Addesso. Following this, Troilo played in numerous orchestras, including those of Juan "Pacho" Maglio, Julio de Caro, Juan d'Arienzo, Angel D'Agostino, and Juan Carlos Cobián.

With his own orchestra, (whose members varied greatly), he played almost continuously, both live and in the studio, until 1975, the year of his death. From 1953 until the mid-60s, Troilo also played with guitarist Roberto Grela as a duo, which later became the Troilo-Grela Quartet. In 1968, having distanced himself from Grela, he formed his own ensemble, the Aníbal Troilo Quartet, which additionally consisted of Ubaldo de Lío on electric guitar, Osvaldo Berlingieri on piano, and Rafael del Bagno on double bass. Berlingieri was later replaced by José Colángelo, who also played in the Aníbal Troilo Orchestra during its final years. In addition to this, Troilo recorded two songs ("El motivo" and "Volver") as a bandoneon duo with Astor Piazzolla.

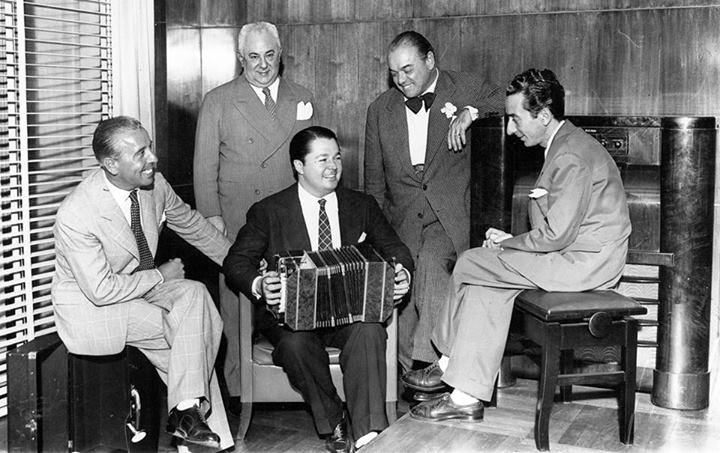
Aníbal Troilo (in the centre, with bandoneon). From left to right: Osvaldo Fresedo, José Razzano, Francisco Canaro and Enrique Santos Discépolo, in 1944.

The death of Troilo's best friend, the poet Homero Manzi (1907–1951), caused him to go into a deep depression that lasted for more than a year. In the poet's memory, he composed the tango Responso.

The "Supreme Bandoneón of Buenos Aires" died on 18 May 1975, at the Italian Hospital of Buenos Aires, from a stroke and subsequent cardiac arrest; he is buried in the "Rincón de los Notables" (Famous corner) of the La Chacarita cemetery, next to Agustín Magaldi and Roberto Goyeneche.

== Bandoneón Day ==
In 2005, the National Congress of Argentina declared 11 July (Troilo's birthday) National Bandoneón Day, to commemorate one of the nation's most celebrated musicians.

== Compositions ==
Partial list of original tangos composed by Aníbal Troilo:

- Toda mi vida (lyrics by Jose Maria Contursi) (1941)
- Con toda la voz que tengo (1941)
- Total pa’ qué sirvo (1941)
- Barrio de tango (lyrics by Homero Manzi) (1942)
- Pa’ que bailen los muchachos (lyrics by Enrique Cadicamo) (1942)
- Acordándome de vos (1942)
- Valsecito amigo (1942)
- Garúa (lyrics by Enrique Cadicamo) (1943)
- Media noche (lyrics by Hector Gagliardi (1944)
- Naipe (1944)
- Garras (1945)
- María (lyrics by Cátulo Castillo) (1945)
- Tres y dos (1946)
- Con mi perro (1946)
- Mi tango triste (1946)
- Romance de barrio (1947)
- Sur (lyrics by Homero Manzi) (1948)
- Che, bandoneón (lyrics by Homero Manzi) (1950)
- La trampera (1951)
- Discepolín (lyrics by Homero Manzi) (1951)
- Responso (dedicated to his closest friend, the poet Homero Manzi) (1951)
- A Pedro Maffia (with guitarist Roberto Grela) (1953)
- Vuelve la serenata (1953)
- Una canción (lyrics by Cátulo Castillo) (1953)
- Patio mío (1953)
- Milonga del mayoral (1953)
- La cantina (1954)
- A la guardia nueva (1955)
- La última curda (lyrics by Cátulo Castillo) (1956)
- Te llaman Malevo (lyrics by Homero Aldo Exposito) (1957)
- A Homero (lyrics by Cátulo Castillo) (1961)
- ¿Y a mí qué? (1962)
- Desencuentro (1962)
- Coplas (1962)
- Yo soy del treinta (lyrics by Hector Mendez) (1964)
- Milonguero triste (1965)
- Dale tango (1966)
- Nocturno a mi barrio (1969)
- Milonga de La Parda (1969)
- El último farol (1969)
- Fechoría (1970)
- Una canción (1971)
- La patraña (1972)
- Tu penúltimo tango (1975)

== Discography ==
=== Aníbal Troilo y su Orquesta Típica ===
==== 78 rpm ====
- Yuyo verde / Garras (1946)
- Yo soy el tango / Mano brava (1949)
- Tú / Y volveremos a querernos (1950)

==== LP ====
- Pichuco y sus cantores (1959)
- Con toda la voz que tengo (with Francisco Fiorentino) (1959)
- Cuando tallan los recuerdos (with Alberto Marino) (1959)
- Tristezas de la calle Corrientes (1959)
- Haunting! The Authentic Argentine Tango (1959)
- Tango recio (with Edmundo Rivero) (1963)
- Café de los Angelitos (with Alberto Marino) (1964)
- Aníbal Troilo – Floreal Ruiz (with Floreal Ruiz) (1964)
- El bulín de la calle Ayacucho (1964)
- Bien milonga (1965)
- Aníbal Troilo – Floreal Ruiz (with Floreal Ruiz) (1965)
- Pichuco sin palabras (1965)
- Troilo – Marino (vol. 3) (with Alberto Marino) (1965)
- Soy un porteño (1966)
- Aníbal Troilo y Roberto Grela (with Roberto Grela) (1966)
- La historia de Aníbal Troilo (vol. 1–3) (1966)
- Otra vez Pichuco 1966)
- Homenaje a Fiorentino (1966)
- Troilo for export (1966)
- Milongueando en el ’40 (1966)
- Tangos de hoy y de siempre (with Osvaldo Pugliese) (1966)
- Troilo – Rivero (with Edmundo Rivero) (1966)
- Lo mejor de Aníbal Troilo (1967)
- Aníbal Troilo for export (vol. 2) (1967)
- Pichuco sin palabras (vol. 2) (1967)
- Ni más ni menos (1968)
- Nuestro Buenos Aires (1968)
- Nocturno a mi barrio (1969)
- El Polaco y yo (with Roberto Goyeneche) (1969)
- Che Buenos Aires (1969)
- Las grandes estaciones de Aníbal Troilo (1969)
- For export (vol. 3) (1970)
- ¿Te acordás... Polaco? (1970)
- A mí me llaman Juan Tango (with Juan D'Arienzo) (1970)
- Tango en Caño 14 (with Atilio Stampone and Roberto Goyeneche) (1972)
- Para vos, Homero (1972)
- De vuelta a Salta (with Dino Saluzzi) (1973)
- Pichuco y sus cantores (1973)
- Raúl Berón y la orquesta de Aníbal Troilo (withRaúl Berón) (1973)
- Quejas de bandoneón (1974)
- Bandoneón tierra adentro (1975)
- Tiempo de Aníbal Troilo (1975)
- Ayer, hoy y siempre (1975)
- Recordando a Aníbal Troilo y su orquesta (1975)
- Latitud de Buenos Aires (1975)
- Bandoneón mayor de Buenos Aires (1975)
- Bandoneón mayor de Buenos Aires (vol. 2) (1975)
- Discepolín (1975)
- Troilo en stéreo (1975)
- El conventillo (1977)
- Recuerdos de bohemia (con el cantor Alberto Marino) (1978)
- Troilo en el ’40 (1979)
- Tango fran Argentina (1983)

==== CD ====
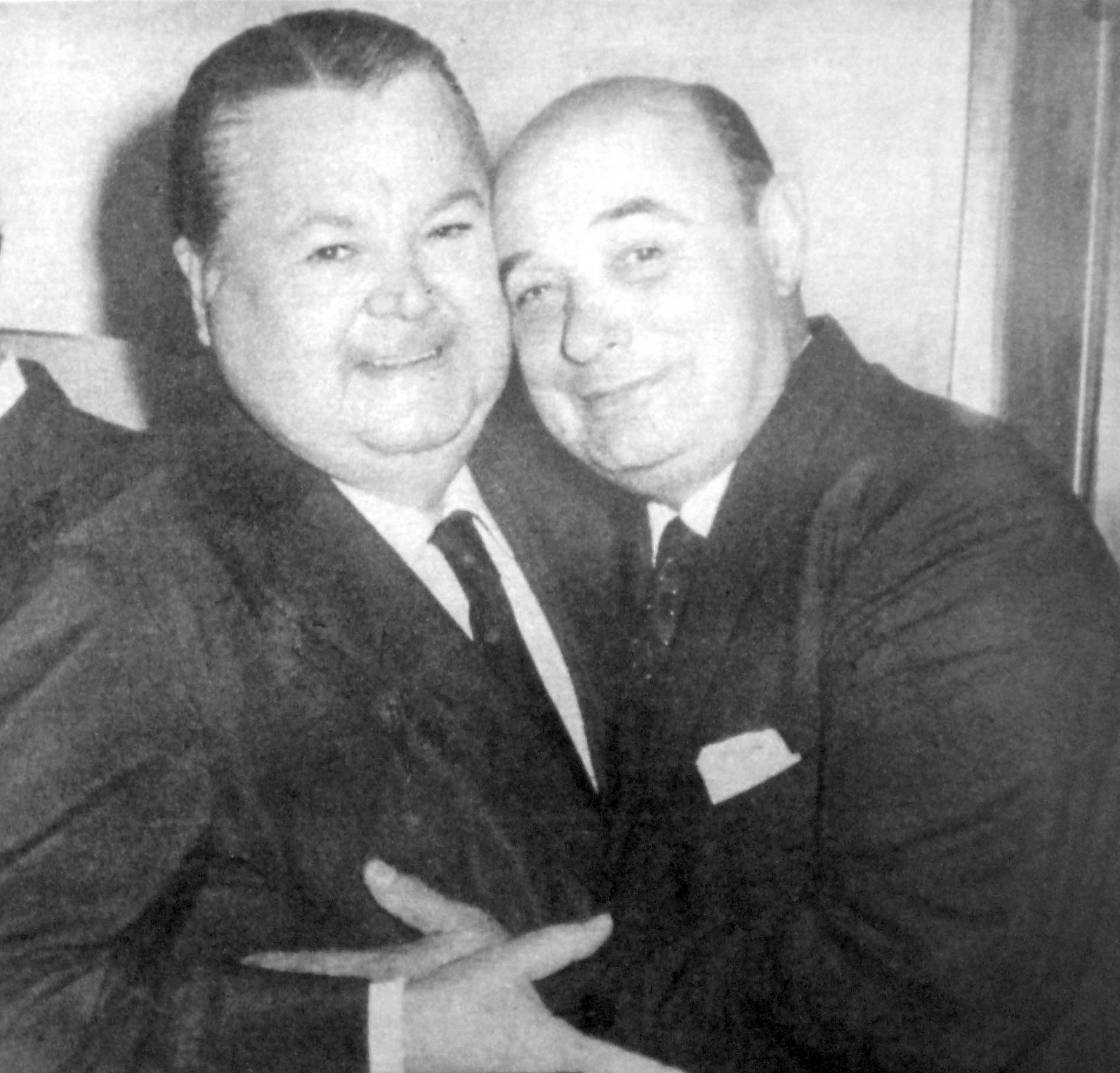
Aníbal Troilo and Cátulo Castillo.

- El inmortal Pichuco (1989)
- Del tiempo guapo (with Francisco Fiorentino) (1994)
- Cuando tallan los recuerdos (with Alberto Marino) (1994)
- Romance de barrio (with Floreal Ruiz) (1994)
- Sur (with Edmundo Rivero) (1994)
- Medianoche (with Jorge Casal and Raúl Berón) (1994)
- Quejas de bandoneón (1994)
- 40 grandes éxitos (1999)

=== Dúo Troilo-Grela ===
==== LP ====
- Esto es tango! (1963)

== Filmography ==
- The Tango Returns to Paris (1948)
- Mi noche triste (1952)
- Vida nocturna (1955)
- Prisioneros de una noche (1960)
- Buenas noches, Buenos Aires (1964)
- Somos los mejores (1968)
- Tango Argentino (1969)
- Ésta es mi Argentina (1974)
- El canto cuenta su historia (1976)
