= El Calavera =

- Directed by: Carlos F. Borcosque
- Written by: Emilio Villalba Welsh; Wilfredo Jimenez
- Starring: Enrique Serrano
- Cinematography: Francis Boeniger
- Edited by: Atilio Rinaldi; Ricardo Rodríguez Nistal
- Release date: 1954
- Running time: 85 minutes
- Country: Argentina
- Language: Spanish

El Calavera is a 1954 Argentinian film of the classical era of Argentine cinema.

Directed by Carlos F. Borcosque, script by Emilio Villalba Welsh and Wilfredo Jimenez, based on Maurice Hennequin's and Pierre Veber's theater play Las delicias del hogar (Les Joies du foyer). The movie was released on August 31, 1954.

== Cast ==
- Enrique Serrano
- Elena Lucena
- Jorge Rivier
- Norma Giménez
- Raimundo Pastore
- Julián Bourges
- Antonio Provitilo
- Ángeles Martínez
- Celia Geraldy
- Rafael Diserio
- Haydée Menta
- Narciso Ibáñez Menta
