= Cinco besos =

- Directed by: Luis Saslavsky
- Written by: Ariel Cortazzo; Luis Saslavsky
- Produced by: Argentina Sono Film
- Starring: Mirtha Legrand; Roberto Escalada; Elena Lucena; Lalo Maura; Benita Puértolas
- Music by: Rodolfo Sciammarella
- Release date: 8 March 1946
- Running time: 94 minutes
- Country: Argentina
- Language: Spanish

Cinco besos (English: Five kisses) is a 1946 Argentine comedy film of the classical era of Argentine cinema, directed by Luis Saslavsky and written by Saslavsky alongside Ariel Cortazzo. It premiered on March 8, 1946.

== Cast ==
- Mirtha Legrand
- Roberto Escalada
- Elena Lucena
- Lalo Maura
- Benita Puértolas
- Ana Nieves
- Warly Ceriani
- Iris Martorell
- Aída Villadeamigo
- Margarita Burke
