= Jorge Washington Ábalos =

Argentine teacher, entomologist, arachnologist and writer

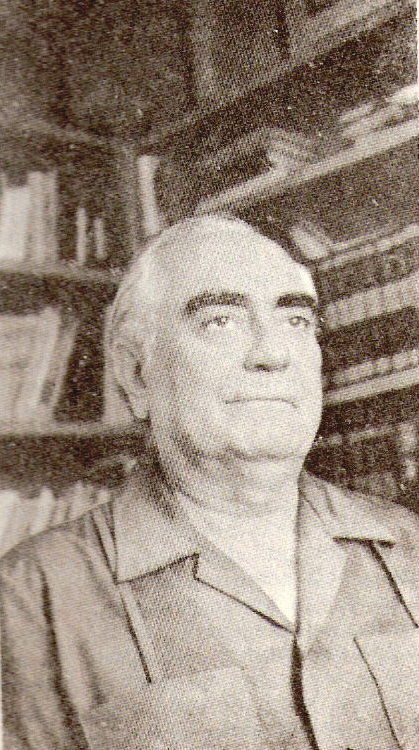
- Jorge W. Ábalos (1979)
- Born: September 20, 1915; La Plata, Buenos Aires Province, Argentina
- Died: September 28, 1979; Córdoba, Argentina
- Education: Teacher training college, Santiago del Estero
- Known for: Pioneer of scorpion research in Argentina; Author of Shunko
- Awards: Guggenheim Fellowship (1968); Doctor honoris causa (1950, 1977)
- Scientific career
- Fields: Entomology, arachnology, toxinology
- Workplaces: National University of Tucumán; National University of Córdoba; Instituto Nacional de Microbiología

Jorge Washington Ábalos (September 20, 1915 – September 28, 1979) was an Argentine teacher, entomologist, arachnologist and writer, best known for his novel Shunko. He was also the first scorpion researcher in Argentina.

== Biography ==
Ábalos was born in La Plata, Buenos Aires Province, to Gabriel Ábalos and Pilar Urieta. In 1933, he completed his teacher training in Santiago del Estero, and the following year began teaching in rural schools in the Gran Chaco region, where he came into contact with local Quechua communities.

While working as a rural teacher, Ábalos developed an interest in regional diseases and venomous animals. His early research included collaboration with physician Salvador Mazza, who was studying Chagas disease along the Río Salado. Later, Ábalos worked with Bernardo Houssay, the 1947 Nobel laureate, collecting live specimens of widow spiders (Latrodectus) for antivenom production. This drew public attention and led the government of Santiago del Estero Province to grant him a research scholarship at the Oswaldo Cruz Institute in Rio de Janeiro to study Triatominae bugs, the vectors of Chagas disease.

In 1943, Ábalos became an entomologist at the Institute of Regional Medicine at the National University of Tucumán, focusing on medical entomology and disease vectors. He married Leonie Albaca in 1947, with whom he had three sons. In 1950, he was awarded an honorary doctorate (Doctor honoris causa) in the biological sciences by the same university, and in 1954, he was appointed Professor of Biology.

In 1957, Ábalos returned to Santiago del Estero, where he founded the **Institute for Venomous Animals**, later named in his honor. He became a technical expert at the National Institute of Microbiology in 1958 and a professor of forest zoology at the Faculty of Forestry in 1959.

In 1962, he undertook a research fellowship at the Museum of Comparative Zoology at Harvard University, collaborating with Herbert Walter Levi on black widow spiders. In 1968, he returned with a Guggenheim Fellowship. By 1966, he was chair of Invertebrate Zoology at the National University of Córdoba, and in 1972, he founded and directed the Center for Applied Zoology there.

Ábalos authored nearly 60 scientific papers and about 15 additional publications, most with a medical focus. His work covered vinchucas, sandflies, bedbugs, venomous snakes, and arachnids. As a pioneer of scorpion studies in Argentina, he introduced new taxonomic criteria and anatomical methods—such as analysis of the hemispermatophore and trichobothria—to Latin American taxonomy. He also demonstrated that several Latrodectus species exist in Argentina, not just one. His scientific works include Las Triatominae Argentina (1951, with Petr Wolfgang Wygodzinsky) and ¿Qué sabe usted de víboras? (1964).

== Literary work ==
Ábalos was also an accomplished writer. His literary output includes short stories and novels that explore social issues tied to the geography and culture of northwestern Argentina.

His best-known work, Shunko (1949), tells the story of a Quechua-speaking boy and his teacher who struggles to understand indigenous culture. The novel, translated into several languages, was adapted for film in 1959 by Lautaro Murúa.

Shunko forms part of a trilogy with Shalacos (1975) and Coshmi, the latter remaining unfinished.

== Honors ==
Ábalos was elected a full member of the National Academy of Sciences of Córdoba in 1975. In 1977, the National University of Santiago del Estero awarded him another honorary doctorate.

== Eponymous taxa ==
Several species have been named in his honor:

- Tetrastichus abalosi (Blanchard, 1950)
- Ameivula abalosi (Cabrera, 2012)
- Gigantodax abalosi (Wygodzinsky, 1958)
- Eurytoma abalosi (De Santis, 1964)
- Hesperoctenes abalosi (Del Ponte, 1945)
- Pirata abalosi (Mello-Leitão, 1942)
- Zelurus abalosi (Lent & Wygodzinsky, 1951)
- Abapeba abalosi (Mello-Leitão, 1942)
- Mastophora abalosi (Urtubey & Báez, 1983)
