= Gilda Lousek =

Argentine actress

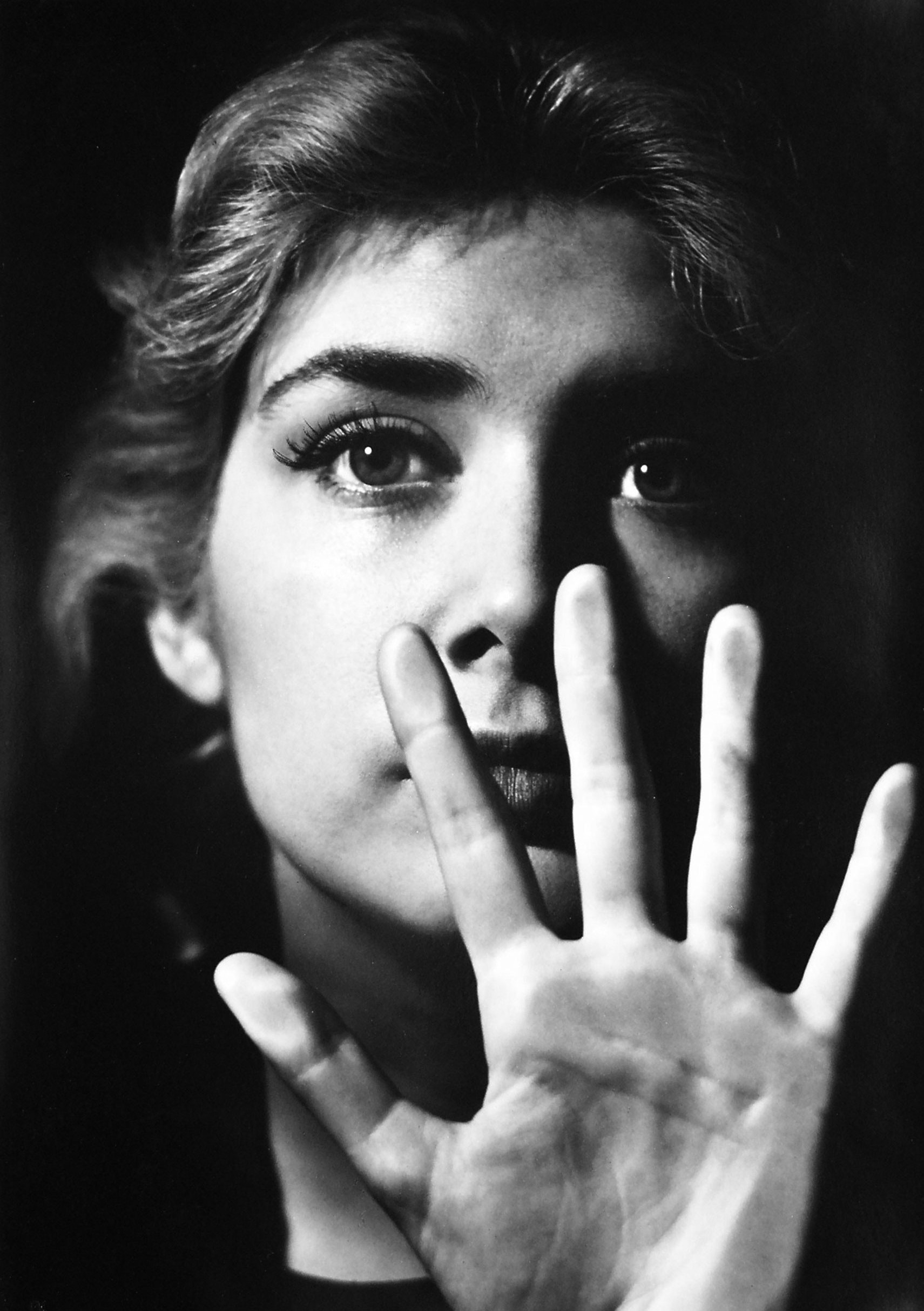
- Gilda Lousek in 1958, photograph by Annemarie Heinrich
- Born: 9 November 1937; Buenos Aires, Argentina
- Died: 29 October 1998 (aged 60); Buenos Aires, Argentina
- Occupation: Actress
- Years active: 1956–1992

Gilda Lousek (9 November 1937 – 29 October 1998) was an Argentine actress. She appeared in more than sixty films from 1956 to 1992.

== Filmography ==
Year	Title	Role	Notes
1956	Los tallos amargos	Esther	
1958	Una Cita con la vida	Nélida	
1958	Hay que bañar al nene		
1959	I Was Born in Buenos Aires		
1962	La procesión		
1962	Sábado a la noche, cine		
1962	La madrastra		
1961	Good Night, My Love		
1962	Mi Buenos Aires querido		
1962	Los inconstantes		
1963	La Murga		
1963	Una excursión a los indios ranqueles		
1964	Canuto Cañete y los 40 ladrones		
1964	Mujeres perdidas		
1965	The Revenge of Ivanhoe	Rowena of Stratford	
1965	By Killing		
1965	Vivir es formidable		
1965	Hotel alojamiento		
1967	The Invisible Man Attacks	Novak	
1967	Villa Cariño		
1967	El glotón		
1968	Lo prohibido está de moda	Yolanda	
1968	Amor y un poco más		
1969	Amor Libre	Julia	
1969	¡Qué noche de casamiento!		
1972	Piloto de pruebas		
1972	Autocine Mon Amour		
1973	Hipólito y Evita		
1974	La gran aventura		
1977	Basta de mujeres	Laura	
1978	El divorcio está de moda - de común acuerdo		
1984	Pasajeros de una pesadilla	Irene	
1990	Enfermero de día, camarero de noche	Tía de Carolina	
1992	Tómame		
