= Prisioneros de una noche =

1962 film

- Directed by: David José Kohon
- Written by: Carlos Latorre
- Produced by: Germen S. Calvo, Leopoldo Torre Nilsson
- Starring: María Vaner, Alfredo Alcón, Osvaldo Terranova
- Cinematography: Alberto Etchebehere
- Edited by: Jacinto Cascales
- Music by: Juan Carlos Cobián, Astor Piazzolla
- Release date: 30 January 1962 (Argentina)
- Running time: 85 minute
- Country: Argentina
- Language: Spanish

Prisioneros de una noche is a 1962 Argentine film.

== Cast ==
- María Vaner
- Alfredo Alcón
- Osvaldo Terranova
- Elena Tritek
- Juan José Edelman
- Osvaldo Pacheco
- Salo Vasochi
- Ovidio Fuentes
- Aníbal Troilo
- Astor Piazzolla
