= Natasha (1974 film) =

- Directed by: Eber Lobato
- Edited by: Carlos Vázquez
- Distributed by: Nort Film
- Release date: 6 June 1974
- Running time: 97 minutes
- Country: Argentina
- Language: Spanish

Natasha is a 1974 Argentine drama film directed by Eber Lobato.

== Cast ==
- Thelma Stefani as Natasha
- Enzo Viena
- Edgardo Suárez
- Rodolfo Salerno
- Mónica Grey
- Susana Juri
- Iris Morenza
- Lili Fitzner
- María Lucero
- Adrián Lobato
