= I Was Born in Buenos Aires =

- Film poster
- Directed by: Francisco Múgica
- Written by: Rodolfo M. Taboada
- Release date: 1959
- Country: Argentina
- Language: Spanish

I Was Born in Buenos Aires (Spanish: He nacido en Buenos Aires) is a 1959 Argentine drama film directed by Francisco Múgica. It presents the tale of a vibrant tango orchestra, comprising three exceptionally talented young musicians. Their journey unfolds from the heart of Buenos Aires to the grand stages of Europe, painting a vivid picture of their musical odyssey.

== Cast (in credits order) ==
- Mario Fortuna as Mario Fortuna
- Gilda Lousek as Gilda Lousek
- Enzo Viena as Enzo Viena
- Santiago Arrieta as Santiago Arrieta
- María Luisa Robledo as María Luisa Robledo
- Alberto Argibay as Alberto Argibay
- Ignacio Quirós as Ignacio Quirós
- Oscar Orlegui as Oscar Orlegui
- Isabel Sánchez as Isabel Sánchez

== Production credits ==
- Produced by: Celestino Anzuola and Eduardo Bedoya
- Music by: Francisco Canaro and Sebastián Piana
- Cinematography by: Ricardo Younis
- Editing by: Atilio Rinaldi and Ricardo Rodríguez Nistal
- Production design by: Germán Gelpi and Mario Vanarelli
