= La Murga =

- Directed by: René Múgica
- Written by: Rodolfo M. Taboada
- Starring: Gilda Lousek; Alberto Argibay; Santiago Gómez Cou
- Cinematography: Oscar Melli
- Edited by: Jorge Gárate
- Music by: Tito Ribero
- Release date: 1963
- Running time: 78 minutes
- Country: Argentina
- Language: Spanish

La Murga is a 1963 Argentine drama film directed by René Múgica. It stars Gilda Lousek, Alberto Argibay, Santiago Gómez Cou and Elena Lucena. Similar to the French New Wave films, La Murga deals with "urban angst", centred on conventillo dwellers. The film was shot in 1961 but wasn't released until 1963.

== Cast ==
- Pola Alonso
- Juan Carlos Altavista
- Alberto Argibay
- Camilo Da Passano
- Jorge De La Riestra
- Horacio Gallo
- Josefa Goldar
- Santiago Gómez Cou
- Bernardo Kullock
- Gilda Lousek
- Elena Lucena
- Luis Mottura
- Carlos Olivieri
- María Esther Podestá
- Julián Pérez Ávila
