= Brother and Sister (2010 film) =

2010 Argentine comedy film

- Film poster
- Spanish: Dos hermanos
- Directed by: Daniel Burman
- Starring: Antonio Gasalla; Graciela Borges
- Release date: 1 April 2010
- Running time: 105 minutes
- Country: Argentina
- Language: Spanish

Brother and Sister (Spanish: Dos hermanos; lit. 'Two siblings') is a 2010 Argentine comedy film directed by Daniel Burman.

== Plot ==
The film tells the story of two brothers who have a love-hate relationship. The recent death of his mother will increase the conflicts between the two. The story takes place in Buenos Aires in Argentina and then moves to the small town of Carmelo, in the Uruguayan department of Colonia.

== Cast ==
- Antonio Gasalla as Marcos
- Graciela Borges as Susana
- Elena Lucena as Mother of Marcos and Susana
- Rita Cortese as Alicia
- Osmar Núñez as Mario
