= La Rubia Mireya =

- Directed by: Manuel Romero
- Cinematography: Antonio Merayo
- Music by: Rodolfo Sciammarella
- Release date: 1948
- Country: Argentina
- Language: Spanish

La Rubia Mireya is a 1948 Argentine film of the classical era of Argentine cinema. It is the story of a woman who was reluctantly married, divorced, and rejected by her daughter.

== Cast ==
- Fernando Lamas
- Mecha Ortiz
- Juan Jose Porta
- Elena Lucena
- Severo Fernandez
