= Enzo Viena =

Argentine actor

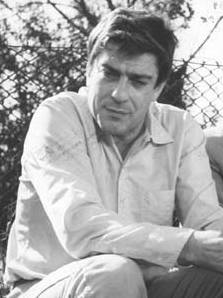
- Viena in 1969
- Born: 16 February 1933; Rosario, Santa Fe, Argentina
- Died: 25 November 2007 (aged 74); Buenos Aires, Argentina
- Occupation: Actor
- Years active: 1958–2007

Enzo Viena (16 February 1933 – 25 November 2007) was an Argentine actor. He appeared in more than sixty films from 1958 to 2007. Destacó por su papel de Nino en la telenovela internacional del mismo nombre "Nino, las cosas simples de la vida" en 1971.

== Selected filmography ==
Year	Title	Role	Notes
1958	Una Cita con la vida	Luis	
1959	I Was Born in Buenos Aires		
1963	Paper Boats		
1966	Arm in Arm Down the Street		
1968	Amor y un poco más		
1969	Amor Libre	Juan	
1974	Natasha	Juan	
