= Reencuentro con la gloria =

1962 film by Iván Grondona

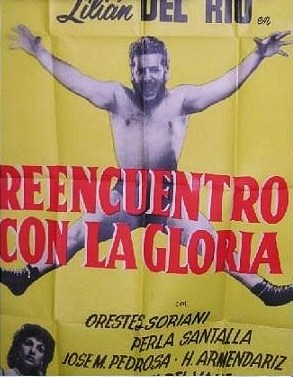
- Directed by: Iván Grondona
- Written by: Iván Grondona
- Produced by: Francisco Tarantini
- Starring: Martín Karadagián; Lilián del Río
- Cinematography: Ernesto Keletti
- Edited by: Rosalino Caterbetti
- Music by: Ferruccio Marzán
- Release date: 1 November 1962
- Running time: 75 min
- Country: Argentina
- Language: Spanish

Reencuentro con la gloria is a 1962 Argentine film, which was actually filmed in 1957, but not released until 5 years later.

== Cast ==
- Martín Karadagián Robert, alias "Pantera"
- Lilián del Río Sonia
- Orestes Soriani Father Roberto
- Perla Santalla Luisa
- José María Pedroza Rodolfo
- Héctor Armendáriz Doctor
- Raúl del Valle Raul Avila
- Pedro Goitía Bobby
- Javier Portales Man on tribune
- Menchu Quesada Bobby's woman
