= Tango Argentino (film) =

- Directed by: Simón Feldman
- Cinematography: Saulo Benavente, Juan Carlos Desanzo
- Production company: Imagen Viva
- Distributed by: Productora Diagonal Cinematográfica; Producciones Primer Avance; S.P.A. C. Cinema (Paris)
- Release date: 1969
- Running time: 75 minutes
- Countries: Argentina; France
- Language: Spanish

Tango argentino (en:Argentine tango) is an Argentine documentary written and directed by Simón Feldman, which was produced in 1969 and shown at a few international film festivals to overall positive reviews. The film includes mounted animation scenes of tango dancers, which was overseen by Francisco García Jiménez.

== Synopsis ==
Tango argentino views life in Buenos Aires and the history of the city's native music and dances.

== Cast ==
- Astor Piazzolla
- Antonio Agri
- Oscar López Ruiz
- Kicho Díaz
- Lita and Jorge
- Quinteto Guardia Vieja
- Conjunto Negro Can de Montevideo
- Oscar Aráiz
- Juan Carlos Cedrón
- Ana Itelman
- Carmencita Calderón
- Bárbara Huguets
- Eduardo Avakian
- Chyoko
- Aníbal Troilo
