= Bandoneón Day =

National holiday in Argentina

Bandoneón Day is celebrated on 11 July each year in Argentina. This date was chosen to mark the birth of the man who is considered the "Supreme Bandoneón of Buenos Aires", the musician Aníbal Troilo.

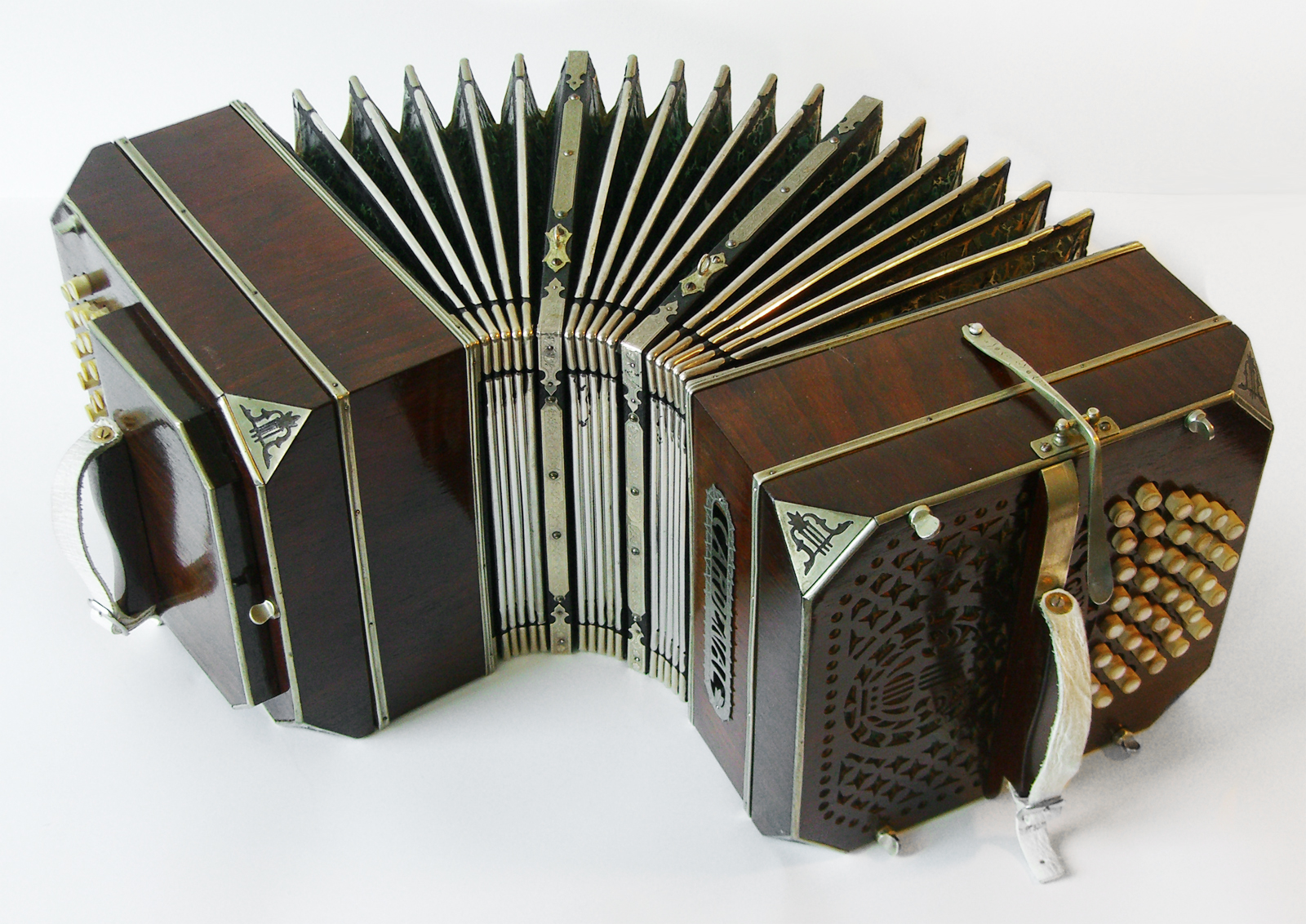
Bandoneon

== Background ==
On 13 April 2000, the city of Buenos Aires sanctioned the law which decreed 11 July as Bandoneón Day.

On 11 July 2005, the Congress of Argentina declared that date as National Bandoneón Day by law, and this was enacted on 18 May 2005. The proponents of this law were Francisco Torne, grandson of Zita Troilo, and the poet Horacio Ferrer, a friend of the musician and president and founder of the National Academy of Tango.

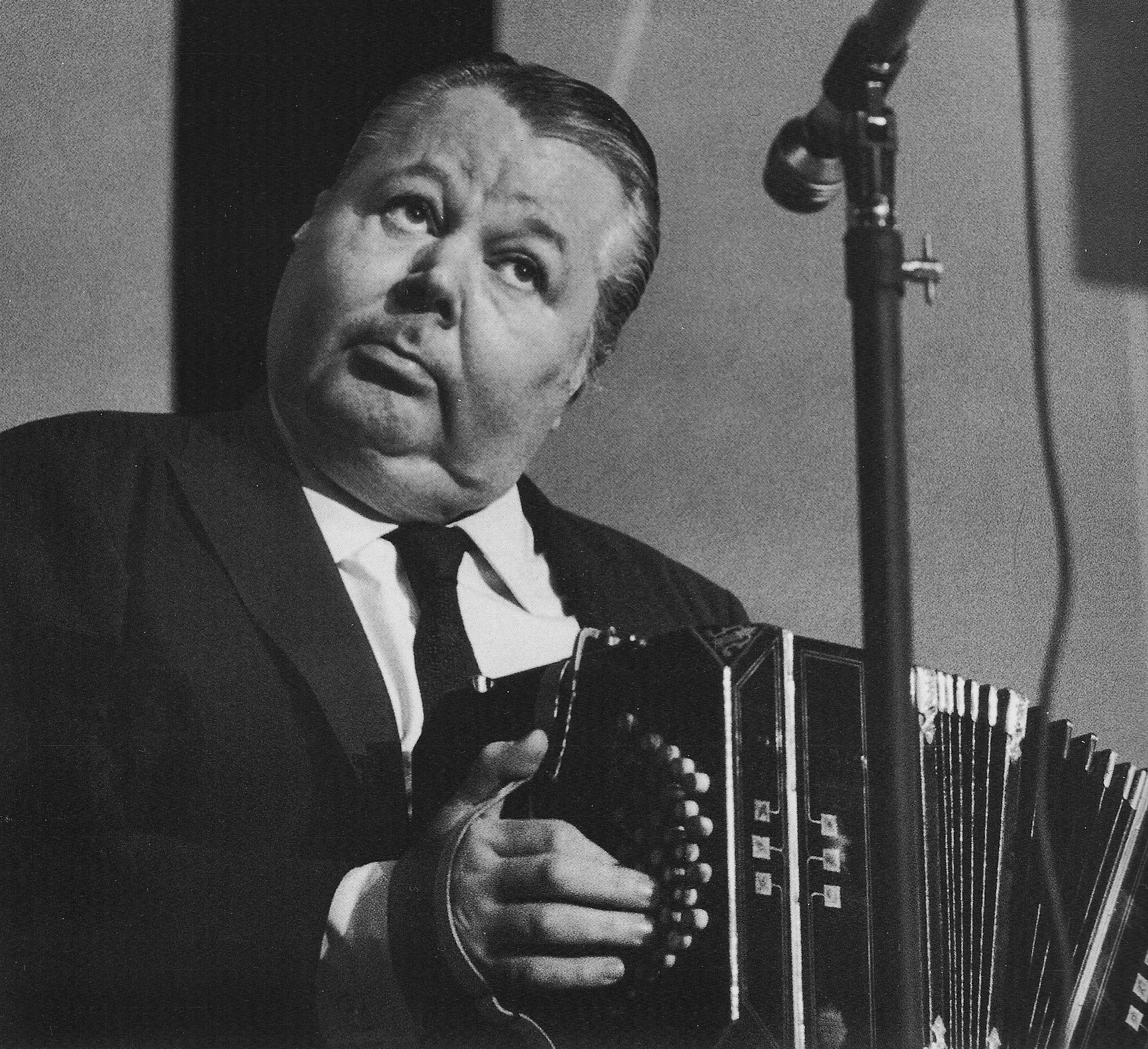
Aníbal Troilo in 1971

== Reason for celebration ==
Aníbal Carmelo Troilo, a.k.a. Pichuco, was born in Buenos Aires on 11 July 1914 and was a distinguished bandoneon player, composer, and tango orchestra conductor. His orchestra experimented with innovative sounds and themes, and he contributed much to the nation's cultural fabric. For these reasons, the date of his birth is used to commemorate the bandoneon.
