= María Luisa Robledo =

Spanish actress

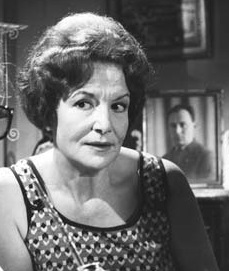
- Robledo in 1968.
- Born: 28 September 1912; Madrid, Spain
- Died: 26 October 2005 (aged 93); Buenos Aires, Argentina
- Occupation: Actress
- Years active: 1947-1996 (film)

María Luisa Robledo (28 September 1912 – 26 October 2005) was a Spanish film and television actress. She was married to the actor Pedro Aleandro. Their daughters María Vaner and Norma Aleandro were also actresses.

== Filmography ==
Year	Title	Role	Notes
1947	Los hijos del otro		
1948	María de los Ángeles	Amiga 3	Uncredited
1949	Pelota de trapo		
1949	La cuna vacía		
1952	Mi noche triste		
1958	Rosaura at 10 O'clock	Doña Milagros Ramoneda - viuda de Perales	
1958	Isla brava		
1959	I Was Born in Buenos Aires		
1960	Sábado a la noche, cine		
1962	The Last Floor		
1962	Mi Buenos Aires querido		
1965	Crónica de un niño solo		
1967	¡Al diablo con este cura!		
1967	El ABC do Amor	Julia's mother	(segment "Noche terrible")
1968	El derecho a la felicidad	Mariá Luisa Robledo	
1969	La vida continúa		
1971	Paula contra la mitad más uno	Rosa	
1973	Um Caipira em Bariloche	Nora's mother in Bariloche	
1974	La balada del regreso	Martín's Mother	
1985	Count to Ten		
1985	The Official Story	Nata	
1996	Juego limpio		(final film role)

== Bibliography ==
- Goble, Alan. The Complete Index to Literary Sources in Film. Walter de Gruyter, 1999.
