= Shunko =

- Directed by: Lautaro Murúa
- Written by: Augusto Roa Bastos
- Based on: The novel Shunko, by Jorge Washington Ábalos
- Produced by: Leo Kanaf; Daniel Cherniavsky
- Starring: Lautaro Murúa; Raúl del Valle; Fanny Olivera
- Cinematography: Vicente Cosentino
- Edited by: José Serra
- Music by: Waldo de los Ríos
- Release date: November 17, 1960 (Argentina)
- Running time: 76 minutes
- Country: Argentina
- Languages: Spanish; Quechua

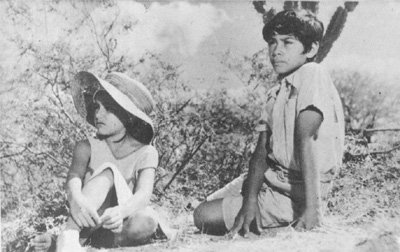
Photo taken during a scene from "Shunko", a film directed by Lautaro Murúa (1960)

Shunko is a 1960 Argentine drama film directed by and starring Lautaro Murúa. It was written by Augusto Roa Bastos and based on Jorge W. Abalos' novel of the same name. It won the Silver Condor Award for Best Film. In a survey of the 100 greatest films of Argentine cinema carried out by the Museo del Cine Pablo Ducrós Hicken in 2000, the film reached the 16th position.

== Synopsis ==
A teacher (Murúa) educated in the big city is assigned to a rural school in the province of Santiago del Estero, where his students are Quechua speakers. Initially, the ethnocentric prejudices of the teacher and his ignorance of the Quechua culture and the children lead him to enter into conflict with his students and to distance himself from them. Little by little it is the teacher who begins to learn from his students, establishing a relationship of respect and mutual learning.

== Cast ==
- Lautaro Murúa
- Raúl del Valle
- Fanny Olivera
- Orlando Sacha
- Gabriela Schóo
- Ángel Greco
- Graciela Rueda
- Marta Roldán
- Oscar Llompart
- Raúl Parini
- Ramón del Valle García
- Guillermina Rosenstein
- Beatriz Abre
- Angélica Monti
