= Good Night, My Love (1961 film) =

1961 film

- Directed by: Román Viñoly Barreto
- Produced by: José Roberto Patrón
- Starring: Miguel Amador; Floren Delbene; Gilda Lousek
- Release date: 1961
- Country: Argentina
- Language: Spanish

Good Night, My Love (Spanish: Buenas noches, mi amor) is a 1961 Argentine film.

== Cast ==
- Miguel Amador
- Floren Delbene
- Gilda Lousek
- Elena Lucena
