= La que no perdonó =

- Directed by: José A. Ferreyra
- Release date: 1938
- Running time: 98 minute
- Country: Argentina
- Language: Spanish

La que no perdonó is a 1938 Argentine film directed by José A. Ferreyra during the Golden Age of Argentine cinema. The film premiered in Buenos Aires.
