= The Terrorist (1962 film) =

- Directed by: Daniel Cherniavsky
- Written by: Daniel Cherniavsky; Tomás Eloy Martinez; Augusto Roa Bastos
- Starring: Emilio Alfaro; Jorge Cavanet; Oscar Ferrigno
- Edited by: Jorge Gárate
- Music by: Atilio Stampone
- Release date: 18 October 1962
- Running time: 77 minutes
- Country: Argentina
- Language: Spanish

The Terrorist (Spanish: El terrorista) is a 1962 Argentine thriller film directed by Daniel Cherniavsky.

The film's art direction was by Gori Muñoz.

== Cast ==
- Emilio Alfaro
- Jorge Cavanet as José María
- Oscar Ferrigno
- María Rosa Gallo
- Beto Gianola
- Jacinto Herrera
- Virginia Lago
- Alberto Lares
- Oscar Llompart
- Horacio Nicolai

== Bibliography ==
- Helene C. Weldt-Basson. Postmodernism's Role in Latin American Literature: The Life and Work of Augusto Roa Bastos. Springer, 2010.
