= Martín Andrade =

Chilean-Argentine actor

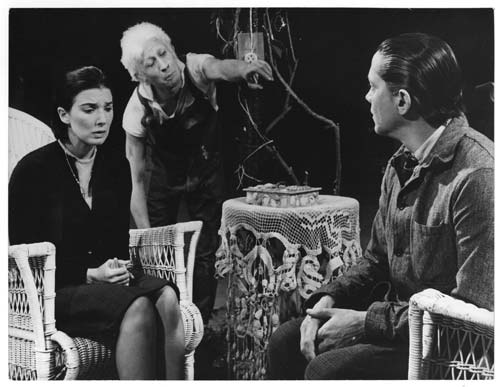

Martín Andrade (July 20, 1937 - June 24, 2013) was a Chilean - Argentine actor. He starred in the 1962 film Una Jaula no tiene secretos.

== Selected filmography ==
- The Last Floor (1962)
