= The Last Floor =

- Directed by: Daniel Cherniavsky
- Written by: Jorge Masciangioli (novel); Tomás Eloy Martinez; Augusto Roa Bastos
- Produced by: Juan Manuel Abre
- Starring: Norma Aleandro; Martín Andrade; Santiago Arrieta
- Cinematography: Antonio Merayo
- Edited by: Jorge Gárate
- Music by: Atilio Stampone
- Release date: 5 June 1962
- Running time: 100 minutes
- Country: Argentina
- Language: Spanish

The Last Floor (Spanish: El último piso) is a 1962 Argentine drama film directed by Daniel Cherniavsky.

The film's art direction was by Gori Muñoz.

== Cast ==
- Norma Aleandro
- Martín Andrade
- Santiago Arrieta
- José De Angelis
- Beatriz Fabre
- Lydia Lamaison
- Inda Ledesma
- Raúl Luar
- Ubaldo Martínez
- Carlos Olivieri
- Ignacio Quirós
- María Luisa Robledo
- Martha Roldán

== Bibliography ==
- Helene C. Weldt-Basson. Postmodernism's Role in Latin American Literature: The Life and Work of Augusto Roa Bastos. Springer, 2010.
