= José A. Martínez Suárez =

Argentine film director and screenwriter (1925–2019)

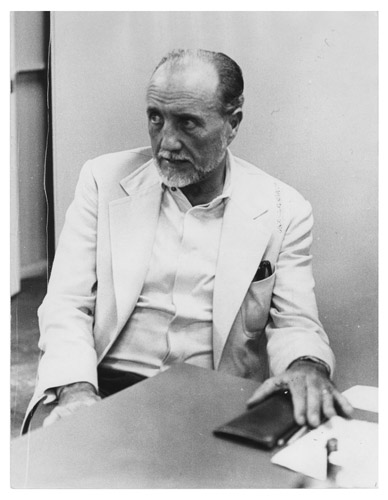
- Born: 2 October 1925; Villa Cañás, Santa Fé, Argentina
- Died: 17 August 2019 (aged 93); Buenos Aires, Argentina
- Resting place: La Chacarita Cemetery
- Occupations: Film director; screenwriter
- Years active: 1949–2003
- Children: 3
- Relatives: Mirtha Legrand (sister); Silvia Legrand (sister)

José Antonio Martínez Suárez (2 October 1925 – 17 August 2019) was an Argentine film director and screenwriter. He worked on more than 20 films between 1949 and 2003. He was the brother of actresses Mirtha and Silvia Legrand.

== Filmography ==
- The Dixielanders: ¿No es ella dulce? - 1956
- Altos Hornos Zapla - 1956
- El Crack - 1960
- Responsibility (Dar la cara) - 1962
- Viaje de una noche de verano - 1965
- El hombre de la víbora - 1965
- Los Chantas - 1975
- Yesterday's Guys Used No Arsenic (Los Muchachos de antes no usaban arsénico) - 1976
- El desafío - 1978
- Nights Without Moons and Suns (Noches sin lunas ni soles) - 1984
