= Daniel Cherniavsky =

Argentine filmmaker

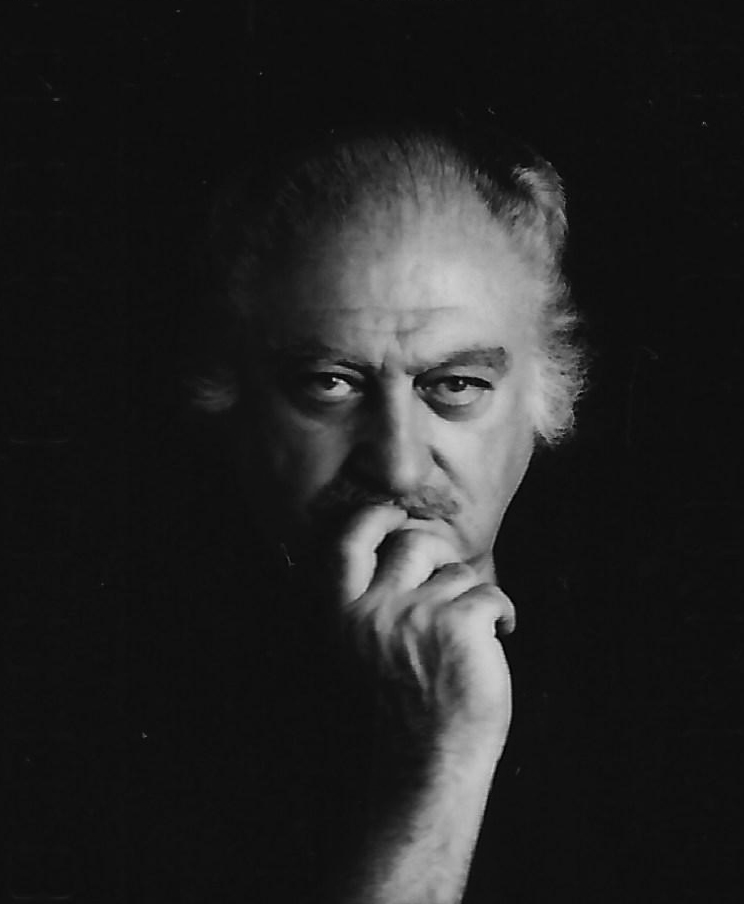
- Born: March 16, 1933 (age 93); Buenos Aires – Argentina
- Occupations: Film director, writer and cultural producer
- Years active: 1947-now
- Notable work: founded Centro de Artes y Ciencias; filmed El Último Piso, El Terrorista, Shunko
- Spouse: Magdalena Ramos
- Awards: Martín Fierro Award

Daniel Cherniavsky (born March 16, 1933, Buenos Aires) is an Argentine writer, filmmaker, director of cinema, and producer of theatre and culture.

He was known for the direction of the feature film El Último Piso (The last floor ), selected to represent Argentine cinema at the Cannes Film Festival and the film El terrorista (The Terrorist), about real events. His films were part of the nouvelle vague of the Argentine cinema in the 60s, and in his artistic production, both in cinema and theater, he carried a strong political and intellectual content.

He was known for the direction of the feature film El último piso, selected to represent Argentine cinema at the Cannes Film Festival and the film El Terrorista, about real events. His films were part of the nouvelle vague of the Argentine cinema in the 60s, and in his artistic production, both in cinema and theater, they carried a strong political and intellectual content.

His films, of lamentable fate, were persecuted by the military dictatorship in Argentina (1976/1983). In television directed the consecrated Argentine actor in "El teatro de Alfredo Alcón" – winning program of Martín Fierro Award of the Argentine TV and was artistic director of diverse television programs.

In Argentina, he founded the "Centro de Artes y Ciencias" where he was responsible for conducting important musical shows and cultural activities before leaving for exile in Brazil. It is from this time the work with the musicians like Chico Buarque de Holanda, Vinicius de Moraes, Astor Piazzolla, Mercedes Sosa and intellectuals like Jorge Luis Borges, Ernesto Sábato, Rodolfo Walsh, Tomás Eloy Martínez, Augusto Roa Bastos, that among others add part of his cultural baggage.

== Biography ==
Son of an industrial entrepreneur and a language teacher, who had 7 languages, his family had no close relation to art. He began as a filmmaker when he was only 14 years old, at a time (1947) in which there were no film schools in Argentina. Self-taught, he created his own program of studies and attended several universities as a student listener. He sought to study the subjects he considered fundamental and in which a film director should go deeper. At the age of 20 he directed an average-length film about a tale written by himself. His first feature came at age 24, with the film "El Último Piso", written by him in partnership with Tomás Eloy Martínez and Augusto Roa Bastos. He then directed "El Terrorista" and co-produced "Shunko". He began as a theater director in 1962, co-directing with Oscar Ferrigno the work "Georges Dandin – El marido Confundido" by Molière. From 1963 to 1974, he directed the "Centro de Artes y Ciencias of Buenos Aires", an important cultural house that fomented discussion and plurality of ideas through the collaboration of artists, musicians, philosophers, sociologists, and psychoanalysts, among other disciplines. In 1974, after a bombing attack, the current military dictatorship closed all the installations of the "Centro de Artes y Ciencias", forcing him to migrate his action to television. Finally, in 1976, harassed by the military repression, he exiled himself to Brazil, where he lived for 40 years and continued his artistic career. He is married to the psychoanalyst Magdalena Ramos, with whom he shares three daughters: "mine (Andy), "yours" (Carolina), and "ours" (Victoria)".

== Exile ==
The military dictatorship closed the siege in the 70s in Argentina. Although not practicing any militancy in any political party, Cherniavsky was persecuted like almost all progressive intellectuals. Bombs were placed in the administrative headquarters of the “Centro de Artes y Ciencias” ("Arts and Sciences Center"), in the movie theater where "El Terrorista" premiered, on the stage of Mercedes Sosa and in the theater hall where Nacha Guevara presented the show "Las Mil y una Nachas" (One of the great successes of the Center and Cherniavsky). The latest incident resulted in the deaths of two people. With the kidnapping and death of the writer Rodolfo Walsh and Piri Lugones (press officer of the institute) as well as dozens of collaborators being kidnapped, killed, or exiled, he was forced to a constant daily pilgrimage to remain incognito. He took refuge in different addresses with his family (wife and two daughters, 2 and 9 years old) not to be found. His wife, Magdalena Ramos, a psychoanalyst, couple and family therapist, and college professor, also suffered from the closure of the University of Buenos Aires and the prohibition of gathering groups. She describes her misfortunes and those of Cherniavsky in the book "Sou daqui e sou de lá – Autobiografia do exílio".

The trigger for deciding on the exile was the discovery of a list where his name appeared with the status: "marked to die". In September 1976, he runs away clandestinely from his country and exiles himself in Brazil. His family arrives a month later. Even today, he is pained to have left in Argentina his eldest daughter, Andy Cherniavsky, today a renowned photographer who at the time had already formed her own family. The disappointment and heartache for losing his history, his language, and the codes of his country made him take 7 years to return for the first time to Argentina.

== Filmography ==
=== In Argentina ===
- 1954 – El Triángulo
- 1959 – Shunko ( coprodutor)
- 1960 – El último piso
- 1961 – El terrorista
- 1962 – Y dale que va

=== In Brasil ===
- 2002 – Buenos Aires Revoltada
- 2006 – O Turista Solitário no Quênia e Tanzânia
- 2007 – O Turista Solitário – Um Hotel sobre rodas na Chapada dos Veadeiros
- 2010 – Essa Louca... Louca... Hollywood
- 2011 – O Turista Solitário na Bariloche X 4
- 2012 – O Turista Solitário em Salta e Jujuy (Argentina)
- 2013 – O Turista Solitário no Chile
- 2014 – O Turista Solitário no Peru
- 2014 – O Turista Solitário na Guatemala e no Mundo Maia
- 2015 – O Turista Solitário em Montevidéu (Uruguai)
- 2015 – O Turista Solitário na Colômbia

== Theater ==
He began in the stages co-directing with Oscar Ferrigno the piece Georges Dandin or the Confounded Husband of Molière, staged in the open air and having as stage the Botanical Garden of Buenos Aires.

He also directed and performed dozens of theater shows in both countries, highlighting "Histórias para serem contadas" by Osvaldo Dragun, who spent two years in Argentina. Produced and directed the musical "Tango!" with Season at the Alfa Theater in São Paulo and in 8 other Brazilian states. He directed the artist Antônio Carlos Nóbrega in the show "CLICK", with season in the theater Tuca.

He was also one of the pioneers in the improvisational theater of Argentina, directing "Peligro Seducción" and then "Teatro Compartido"—a spectacle-experience that united Psicodrama (a psychoanalyst), theater (a playwright, a director, and the cast), and the audience as authors of the work.

== Main Directed Shows ==
=== In Argentina ===
- 1963 – George Dandin by Molière
- 1964 – Y dale que va...(Co-author with Armando Discépolo, Andrés Lizarraga, Oscar Ferrigno and Atilio Stampone)
- 1966 – "El Señor Fulano”
- 1967 – Pagador de Promesas by Dias Gomes
- 1968 – "Histórias para ser contadas" by Osvaldo Dragún.
- 1969 – "Un tren o cualquier otra cosa" by Pedro Orgambide
- 1970 – " Peligro Seducción”
- 1971 – "Teatro Compartido”

=== In Brazil ===
Director of:

- 2006 – CLICK ! – Tal vez abrindo mais a boca"
- 2010 – ¡TANGO!

== Television ==
=== In Argentina ===
Artistic direction of the programs:

- 1974 – El Teatro de Alfredo Alcón
- 1974 – Las Vendedoras (soap opera)
- 1975 – El Teatro Beban-Barreiro (adapted theater cycle)
- 1975 – Lo Mejor de Nuestra Vida, Nuestros hijos (soap opera)

== Teaching ==
=== In Argentina ===
- 1963/1974 – Full Professor of the Direction of Cinematography in the "Instituto Del Film" and "Centro de Artes y Ciencias”

=== In Brazil ===
- 1980/1985 – Director and teacher of "Drama-Visão", School of Dramatic Art and Film Direction.

(The actress Julia Gam, who is an outstanding Brazilian actress, was one of the students, among other actors and professional actresses of Brazil)

== Literary works ==
Written in Argentina:

- El último piso (Co-author with Tomás Eloy Martínez and Augusto Roa Bastos – Film adaptation of the novel of the same name (feature film) – Romance awarded by Editora Losada
- El Terrorista (Co-author with Tomás Eloy Martínez and Augusto Roa Bastos of the original book for cinema (feature film).)
- El Triángulo (Author of the original story and his adaptation for the cinema (half-length film)).
- Y dale que va... (Co-author with Armando Discépolo, Andrés Lizarraga, Atílio Stampone and Oscar Ferrigno of the satirical-musical play)

Written in Argentina:

- Soñadoras, Coquetas y Ardientes (Romance published in Brazil (Sonhadoras, Coquetes e Ardentes) and in Argentina. Best Seller da Editora)
- Ochocientos años Gabriel (Romance published in Argentina)
- Chocolate Amargo – La Novela de las Parejas – (Romance about the conflicts of coexistence in couples)

== Cultural Producer ==
=== In Argentina ===
He was Founder and Director during 11 years of the "Centro de Artes y Ciencias" of Buenos Aires. International cultural and scientific institution.

Some of the collaborating personalities:

- Jorge Luis Borges
- Quino (Mafalda)
- Chico Buarque de Hollanda
- Toquinho
- Maria Creuza
- Astor Piazzolla
- Ballet de Ceylán
- Ernesto Sábato
- Torcuato Di Tella
- Los Solistas de Ginebra

Directed Shows:

- Vinícius de Moraes (Brasil)
- Chico Buarque de Hollanda (Brasil)
- Toquinho (Brasil)
- Maria Creuza (Brasil)
- Grupo Santana de Rock (U.S.A.)
- Michel Legrand (Francia)
- Juliette Greco (Francia)
- Mercedes Sosa (Argentina)
- Mikis Theodorakis (Grecia)
- Astor Piazzolla (Argentina)
- Ballet de Israel (Israel)
- Ballet de Jerusalén (Israel)
- George Moustaki (Grécia)
- Conjunto Pro Música (Argentina)
- Camerata Bariloche (Argentina)
- Ángel Parra (Chile) and others.

=== In Brazil ===
He was director of the Institution "Show 10 – Eventos" located in the cities of São Bernardo do Campo and Diadema, São Paulo. (Designed for cultural, musical, cinematographic and theatrical activities directed at the communities of São Paulo ABCD paulista*.

== Awards and Highlights ==
=== Literature ===
- Best Seller of the Publisher by Soñadoras, Coquetas e Ardientes – Romance published in Brazil and Argentina.

=== SHOWS ===
• Some of the shows conducted in Argentina reached 50,000 people.

=== Cultural production ===
• The “Centro de Artes y Ciencias” (“Center of Arts and Sciences of Buenos Aires” carried out more than 6,000 Scientific and Cultural activities. It revealed numerous artistic glories of Argentina like Mercedes Sosa, Astor Piazzolla, Les Luthiers, etc.

=== TEACHING ===
• The Drama-Vision School of Dramatic Art and Film Direction, which he founded and directed in São Paulo, had 500 students.

=== CINE ===
- "SHUNKO" – Co-producer (a feature film chosen by UNESCO to commemorate 100 years of cinema as one of the 50 most important films in world cinema history, as well as a long list of international awards and distinctions.
- "El último Piso" – One of three films selected to represent Argentine cinema at the International Cannes Film Festival.
- "El Terrorista" – On real facts. The film deserved a bomb on the second day of the premiere and the copies and negatives are gone forever.
- The documentaries "Buenos Aires Revoltada" (Filmed for 2 years) and "Essa Louca ... Louca ... Hollywood" were sponsored by the Brazilian Ministry of Culture.

=== Television ===
- Prêmio Martín Fierro, the principal of Argentine TV for "El Teatro de Alfredo Alcón".

=== THEATER ===
- ¡TANGO! In the Alpha Theater. Its success determined a national tour in 8 Brazilian states.

• Directed the monologue "El señor Fulano". The actor José Maria Gutiérrez received the award of the Association of Argentine Journalists of Theater as the best actor of the year.

- Co-director of the "George Dandin" of Molière, for the Municipality of the City of Buenos Aires, was the winner of the Competition among 52 projects presented. It was presented throughout the summer season outdoors in the Botanical Garden whose park was part of the action as it takes place in a palatial garden.
- "Histórias para serem contadas" by Osvaldo Dragún. Two years in poster in Buenos Aires. With seasons in the interior of Argentina and in Montevideo (Uruguay). Award of the magazine Teatro XX for the best show of the year. Invited to be presented at several Latin American universities.
