= El Crack (1960 film) =

1960 film

- Directed by: José A. Martínez Suárez
- Written by: José A. Martínez Suárez; Carlos Alberto Parrilla; Solly Schroder
- Produced by: José A. Martínez Suárez
- Cinematography: Humberto Peruzzi
- Edited by: Gerardo Rinaldi; Antonio Ripoll
- Music by: Ástor Piazzolla and Víctor Schilchter
- Release date: 1960
- Running time: 81 minutes
- Country: Argentina
- Language: Spanish

El Crack is a 1960 Argentine film produced and directed by José A. Martínez Suárez. The script was written by José A. Martínez Suárez, Carlos Alberto Parrilla and Solly Schroder, based on the book by Jose A. Gerino. The music was done by Ástor Piazzolla and Víctor Schilchter; and the production company was Alithia Cinematográfica. Photography by Humberto Peruzzi.

== Synopsis ==
The setting is the business side of professional football, especially the dark underbelly of the business, including bribes, drugs, and a variety of types of questionable manipulation.
