= Carmencita Calderón =

Argentine tango dancer (1905–2005)

- Born: Carmen Micaela Risso de Cancellieri; February 10, 1905; Villa Urquiza, Argentina
- Died: October 31, 2005 (aged 100); Villa Lugano, Argentina
- Occupation: Dancer
- Known for: Popularizing Argentine tango

Carmen Micaela Risso de Cancellieri (February 10, 1905 – October 31, 2005), better known as Carmencita Calderón, was an Argentine tango dancer.

== Biography ==
Calderón was born into a poor Italian immigrant family on 10 February 1905 in Villa Urquiza, Buenos Aires. Her mother died, leaving her, an older brother, and two younger sisters, when Calderón was 13 years old.

Calderón began dancing at 13 years old under the tutelage of her brother, Eduardo. In 1932 she accompanied her sisters to a local dance at the Club Sin Rumbo in Villa Urquiza. It was here she met and danced with José Giambuzzi (better known as Tarila) who afterwards introduced her to El Cachafaz (Ovidio José Bianquet) and Carlos Gardel at the Bar Corrientes the following day. Pleased with her dancing, El Cachafaz took her on as his dance partner. They danced together for ten years in various productions, and created a unique style of tango with their "sentadas, corridas y cortes" (sits, runs and breaks). She and El Cachafaz debuted with the Pedro Maffia Orchestra at the Teatro de San Fernando in 1933. She also appeared alongside El Cachafaz in "¡Tango!" in 1933, her first sound film. In 1940 she performed in the film Carnaval de antaño accompanying Florencio Parravicini, whom she met via Carlos Gardel. She went on various tours, some with "La historia del tango" with Francisco Canaro. She made her final appearance with El Cachafaz at Mar del Plata in on 7 February 1942. He died of a heart attack in her arms at the performance.

After her partner's death in 1942 Calderón continued making appearances. She danced at the Palermo Palace with the Ángel D'Agostino Orchestra, with singer Ángel Vargas. In 1969 she appeared in the musical film "Tango argentino".

After the death of Ángel Vargas she continued dancing with other partners including Pibe Palermo and Juan Averna, in "El abrojito", on Alsina street. The Buenos Aires Legislature paid tribute to her in 2001, at 96 years old, for her role in popularizing milonga and tango. In 2002 she was again honored at the Teatro Colón and at the IV Festival Buenos Aires Tango, where she danced with Juan Carlos Copes.

To mark her 100th birthday, Calderón performed a tango, with Jorge Dispari as partner, her final public performance. This event also featured an exhibit of her outfits and unreleased videos of her life. She died a few months afterwards, on 31 October 2005, of pneumonia, in the district of Villa Lugano, Buenos Aires. Her remains were cremated at the Chacarita cemetery.

== Filmography ==
- Tango (1933)
- Carnaval de antaño (1940)
- Tango argentino (unedited, 1969)
