= Pablo Moret =

Argentine actor (1933–2025)

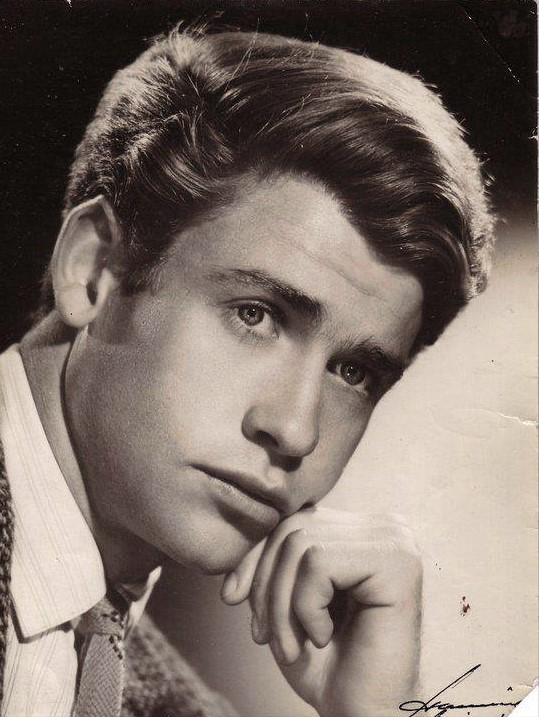
Moret by Annemarie Heinrich

Pablo Moret (2 June 1933 – 28 December 2025) was an Argentine actor. He starred in the 1962 film Una Jaula no tiene secretos.

Moret died on 28 December 2025, at the age of 92.
